= Guo Ailun =

Chinese basketball player (born 1993)

Guo Ailun 郭艾伦
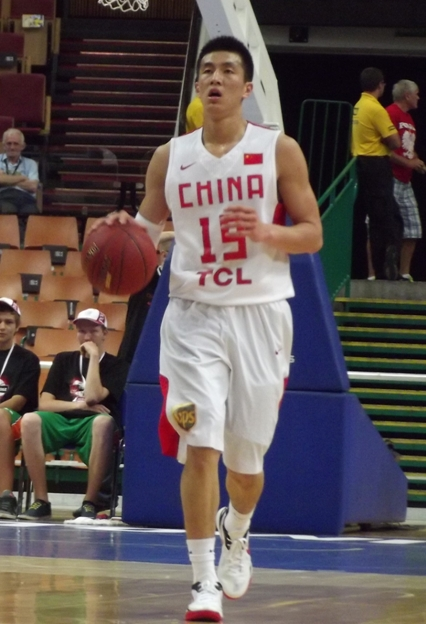

Personal information
- Born: November 14, 1993 (age 33) Liaoyang, Liaoning, China
- Listed height: 6 ft 2.5 in (1.89 m)
- Listed weight: 190 lb (86 kg)

Career information
- NBA draft: 2015: undrafted
- Playing career: 2010–present
- Position: Point guard / shooting guard
- Number: 13

Career history
- 2010–2024: Liaoning Flying Leopards
- 2024–2026: Guangzhou Loong Lions

Career highlights
- 4× CBA Champion (2018, 2022–2024); 8× CBA All-Star (2013, 2015–2021)
Medals
Men's basketball
Representing China
FIBA Asia Championship
Gold medal – first place	2015 Changsha	Team competition
East Asian Games
Silver medal – second place	2013 Tianjin
FIBA Asia Under-18 Championship
Gold medal – first place	2010 Yemen
FIBA Under-16 Asia Cup
Gold medal – first place	2009 Johor Bahru

Guo Ailun (Chinese: 郭艾伦; pinyin: Guō Àilún; born November 14, 1993) is a Chinese professional basketball player for the Chinese national team. He is the first Chinese basketball player to sign with Jordan Brand. He is the nephew of former Chinese professional basketball player Guo Shiqiang.

== Early life ==
In July 2009, Guo attended LeBron James' Skills Academy in Akron, Ohio, while already part of the Liaoning Hunters organisation, impressing some observers with his ball handling, dynamism and court vision.

His international exploits over the 2010 summer (see below) pushed the league in creating a clause that allowed the then 17-year-old to play in the Chinese Basketball Association (CBA) despite being underage. He made his debut for Liaoning on December 12, 2010, against Qingdao DoubleStar with 10 points and 2 rebounds, finishing the season with averages of 10.3 points and 3.1 assists in 26 minutes per game. By the end of his rookie season, he was selected for the CBA All-star Rookie Challenge, posting 28 points and 6 assists on his way to a game MVP title.

Guo was a late addition to the April 2011 Nike Hoop Summit in Portland, Oregon. Struggling with communication (he reportedly spoke no English whatsoever) he impressed scouts in practice with his dedication and skill but had a quiet game against Team USA, going 1 for 5 from the field and committing two turnovers.

== Professional career ==
The 2011–12 CBA season ended with figures of 8.6 points, 3.2 assists and 2 rebounds in around 21 minutes per game for Guo as Liaoning again failed to make the playoffs. For the second year running, he took part in the Rookie Challenge, leading all players with 30 points in addition to 6 assists on his way to a second game MVP award. Also during the CBA All-Star Weekend, he won the Skills challenge after completing it in 32.7 seconds.

He was reportedly offered a contract by Greek League giants Panathinaikos over the 2012 summer. Though the player was said to be interested, his club and local sports administrators vetoed the putative move. Liaoning were vindicated in their decision as he then enjoyed a breakthrough 2012–13 CBA season, starting at point with 34 minutes per game on average as the team finished with its best record in several years and qualified for the playoffs. He scored a career-high 35 points in a December 7 regular season game against the Qingdao Eagles and then dished out a career-high 12 assists against Jiangsu Dragons a month later. Finishing the season with averages of 15.8 points, 4.2 assists and 2.7 rebounds, he equalled his earlier mark with 35 points in a losing effort to the Xinjiang Flying Tigers in Game 5 of the playoffs first round as Liaoning exited. Besides defending his skills challenge title with a 39-second time, Guo was voted as a starter for the 2013 CBA All-star game.

Guo's 2013–14 CBA season was severely hampered by a right-arm injury that restricted him to six games over the season.

He returned to form during the 2014–15 CBA season, forming a destructive backcourt partnership with Lester Hudson, as Liaoning enjoyed one of their best-ever seasons with a second-place finish in the regular season before going on to reach the Playoffs finals against the Beijing Ducks. The point guard had 14 points—including 10 in the fourth quarter—as Liaoning won game 3 to take a 2–1 lead in the best of seven series, he later had 15 points in game 6 but could not prevent a loss that handed the title to Beijing. Finishing the season with figures of 13.5 points, 5.6 assists and 2.5 steals in nearly 33 minutes per game, he was among the season MVP candidates, besides again being voted as a starter for the All-star game.

Despite issues with Liaoning over contractual talks, Guo continued on that good form for the 2015–16 CBA season, he had a season-high 32 points as well as 10 assists, 6 rebounds and 4 steals to lead Liaoning to an avenging 108–96 win over Beijing in January 2016. He had 26 points (on 91.7% shooting from two) in the team's 16th consecutive win during the penultimate round against the Tianjin Gold Lions, thus guaranteeing the franchise a historic regular-season first place.

Finishing the season with 15.5 points, 5.9 assists, 3.2 rebounds and 2.1 assists in 33 minutes per game, he was second in votes for the season's domestic MVP, behind perennial MVP Yi Jianlian. Again voted as starter for the All-star game, he posted 28 points and 8 assists in the North's blowout 172–145 win.

In game 3 of the playoffs first round against the Zhejiang Golden Bulls, he had 15 points and a game-high 11 assists to help the Flying Leopards to a 127–111 win and a series sweep. Moving on to the semis against the Guangdong Southern Tigers, Guo had 20 points, 6 assists and 4 rebounds in a 105–96 game 4 win that took Liaoning to the finals where they would face the unheralded Sichuan Blue Whales.

=== Sichuan series and brawl ===
After losing game 3 of the series away in Chengdu on 16 March, Guo was heavily involved in a brawl opposing Sichuan fans with members of the Liaoning organisation. The confrontation started when the Blue Whales fans—who were waiting for their team at the hotel they shared with Liaoning—were provoked by someone in the Liaoning camp when the away team arrived before the home team. This sparked a scuffle between the fans and the Liaoning delegation, the players were not involved until the fathers of Guo and teammate He Tianju were allegedly attacked, prompting Guo and some teammates to join the ruckus.

Guo, adamant that he only got involved to protect his father, was sent back to Liaoning along with He and another teammate to receive medical treatment the next day. They took a morning flight one day later. He was ruled out with an injury but Guo was neither injured nor suspended as had been feared by some. Taking part in game 4 the same day, he had a team-second 18 points and 6 assists, but the visibly rattled Flying Leopards lost the game to go 3–1 down in the series.

He then had 17 points, 7 rebounds, 5 steals and a single assist in a combative performance during game 5 that proved in vain as Sichuan won 94–91 to keep the series and the championship in Chengdu.

=== 2017-18 season ===
Liaoning eliminated Zhejiang with 4-0, which earned Liaoning the first CBA championship. In game 4, Guo played 35 minutes with 19 points, 8 rebounds, and 5 assists.

=== 2018-19 season ===
Guo played 49 games for Liaoning with average 34 minutes, 23.6 points, 4.9 rebounds, 5.8 assists, and 1.9 steals.

=== 2019-20 season ===
On June 24, Guo moved past Eugene Jeter for seventh on the all-time assisting list of CBA.

=== Recent career ===
On 3 August 2026, Guo decided to leave Guangzhou Loong Lions after two seasons.

== National team career ==
Guo led the national representative side to the 2009 FIBA Asia Under-16 Championship title as they won all their games to qualify for the Under-17 World Championship. In the July 2010 event in Hamburg, Guo led all Under-17s with 22.4 points (to go with 5.5 assists and 4.9 rebounds).

At 16, he was a surprise inclusion with the senior Chinese national team at the 2010 FIBA World Championship, making him the youngest ever player to turn up for China. He played only 23 minutes in two games during the tournament, scoring two free throws in addition to 2 rebounds and 2 assists against 4 turnovers. In September of the same year, the youngster participated in a third tournament, namely the 2010 FIBA Asia Under-18 Championship, where he made the All-tournament team as China took home the title.

The Junior National Team captain was said to have been the leader of a player revolt to oust coach Fan Bin because of his abusive style in April 2011. Thirteen players (including Guo) signed a letter demanding the Chinese Basketball Association replace Fan, the CBA criticised both the coach—who they suspended—and the players for their public actions. He next appeared at the May 2011 Nike International Junior Tournament with the Under-19s' national team, posting 14.3 points and 3.7 assists whilst drawing 5 fouls per game, on his way to an All-Tournament team selection. In the same age group, Guo participated in the World Championship played in Latvia in June/July 2011, contributing team bests of 15 points and 2.8 assists per game over the tournament.

He was cut from the senior side pegged to play in the 2011 FIBA Asia Championship, before disciplinary issues (such as tardiness and attitude problems during the U19 World Championship) led to him being handed a one-year suspension from the senior side.

Recalled to the senior side in April 2012, the 18-year-old was the youngest basketball player at the 2012 Olympic Games where he was a peripheral figure, taking part in three out of the five Chinese losses for 3.3 points and 1 rebound on average.

Guo—now entrenched into the senior national team fold—entered the 2013 FIBA Asia Championship with high hopes, as did perennial title-favourite China. Both flattered to deceive, however; though Guo had respectable figures of 8.1 points and 2.3 assists per game, he disappeared along with teammates in important games. He had only 7 points (on 3–11 shooting) against South Korea, Iran and Chinese Taipei against all of whom China lost to finish fifth, the lowest-ever finish for a full-strength side at the tournament.

He participated in the 2014 Asian Games with China, scoring only 9 points in the quarterfinal round loss against Japan (an opponent that had never beaten them in Asiad history) as China made an early exit.

Eager to impress in the 2015 FIBA Asia Championship played at home, Guo shone, contributing 10.9 points (on 54.8% shooting), 4 assists and 3.2 rebounds per outing in making the tournament's All-Star Five. He earned his first career silverware when China won the title to qualify for the 2016 Olympics. That was helped by his commanding display in the final against the Philippines, outplaying his counterpart and fellow All-Star Jayson Castro to lead his team in scoring 19 points and grabbing 6 rebounds.

On May 10, 2017, he became the first Chinese-born player to be signed by Jordan Brand Shoes.

In 2019 FIBA Basketball World Cup, becoming the best Asian team would win the Chinese basketball national team a ticket for 2020 Olympic game. China national team was in the group A against Poland, Venezuela, and Ivory Coast. Guo was selected as a starting shooting guard and people had high expectations for his performances. Against Korea, Guo scored the team's highest 16 points, and his three-pointer at the last minute killed the game. Even so, Guo did not meet people's expectations. His biggest problem stems from the huge ups and downs of his performance. Against Poland, Guo only played 14 minutes because of too many fouls, and he only scored 6 points. Against Venezuela, Guo only got one point, and he was abandoned by Li Nan, the head coach, most of the time in the second half. At the end of the qualifying match against Nigeria, Guo had 2 points, 2 rebounds and 2 assists in 15 minutes.

Guo was included in China's squad for the 2023 FIBA Basketball World Cup qualification.

== Career statistics ==
=== CBA ===
Legend
GP	Games played	GS	Games started	MPG	Minutes per game
FG%	Field-goal percentage	3P%	3-point field-goal percentage	FT%	Free-throw percentage
RPG	Rebounds per game	APG	Assists per game	SPG	Steals per game
BPG	Blocks per game	PPG	Points per game

==== Regular season ====
Year	Team	GP	GS	MPG	FG%	3P%	FT%	RPG	APG	SPG	BPG	PPG
2010–11	Liaoning	31	12	26.0	.426	.291	.707	2.4	3.1	1.0	.0	10.3
2011–12	Liaoning	30	6	21.2	.475	.281	.681	2.0	3.2	0.9	.1	8.6
2012–13	Liaoning	32	25	33.7	.511	.368	.620	2.7	4.2	1.8	.0	15.8
2013–14	Liaoning	2	0	22.0	.462	.333	.800	2.5	1.5	1.5	.5	8.5
2014–15	Liaoning	37	36	32.6	.514	.346	.654	2.6	5.6	1.8	.1	13.5
2015–16	Liaoning	36	32	33.4	.488	.407	.743	3.3	6.2	1.8	.1	15.4
2016–17	Liaoning	33	27	32.1	.525	.390	.742	4.3	4.4	1.9	.2	19.1
2017–18	Liaoning	36	27	30.9	.455	.335	.731	4.0	4.1	1.2	.2	16.5
2018–19	Liaoning	41	41	34.7	.501	.343	.753	4.8	5.8	1.9	.1	23.2
2019–20	Liaoning	35	32	33.3	.510	.311	.757	3.7	5.0	1.5	.1	20.3
2020–21	Liaoning	44	41	32.5	.484	.278	.774	4.0	8.1	1.5	.1	23.1
Career		357	279	30.9	.492	.338	.733	3.5	5.1	1.5	.1	17.0

==== Playoffs ====
Year	Team	GP	GS	MPG	FG%	3P%	FT%	RPG	APG	SPG	BPG	PPG
2012–13	Liaoning	5	5	39.0	.514	.500	.563	2.8	5.0	1.6	.0	18.4
2013–14	Liaoning	4	2	21.3	.348	.300	.714	1.0	0.5	1.3	.0	6.0
2014–15	Liaoning	12	12	36.7	.452	.355	.722	3.7	3.6	2.0	.2	14.2
2015–16	Liaoning	12	12	38.8	.449	.283	.780	3.8	5.4	1.3	.2	17.2
2016–17	Liaoning	8	8	36.9	.507	.395	.750	4.3	3.6	2.8	.0	23.3
2017–18	Liaoning	13	13	34.6	.494	.379	.703	4.2	5.4	0.5	.2	17.0
2018–19	Liaoning	8	8	36.8	.475	.346	.721	5.4	5.9	2.1	.1	25.1
2019–20	Liaoning	6	6	33.7	.531	.417	.806	3.8	5.5	1.8	.0	23.8
Career		68	66	35.7	.481	.361	.736	3.8	4.6	1.6	.1	18.3

=== 2019 FIBA Basketball World Cup ===
Date	Team	Against	Minutes played	FG%	3P%	FT%	Rebounds	Assists	Steals	Blocks	Efficiency	Points
08/31/2019	China	Cote d’Ivoire	33	.500	.000	.500	3	8	2	0	+21	17
09/02/2019	China	Poland	14	.333	.500	.500	0	4	0	0	+4	6
09/04/2019	China	Venezuela	19	.000	.000	.500	0	0	1	0	-8	1
09/06/2019	China	Korea	26	.438	.400	.000	2	5	2	0	+15	16
09/08/2019	China	Nigeria	15	.000	.000	1.000	2	2	1	0	0	2
Average			21.3	.340	.188	.625	1.4	3.8	1.2	0	+6.4	8.4

== Achievements ==
Year awarded	Awarded content
2019	China Forbes elite under 30
2014	CBA 2012-2013 season best point guard
2013	CBA All Star Skills Challenge champion
2013	CBA 2012-2013 the most improved player
2012	CBA All Star Skills Challenge champion
2012	CBA All Star Rookie Challenge MVP
2011	CBA All Star Rookie Challenge MVP
2010	U18 Asian Youth Championship MVP

== Personal life ==
His uncle is former Liaoning Hunters and Chinese national player Guo Shiqiang; coincidentally, he is also Ailun's coach at Liaoning and with the Chinese national team (the latter as an assistant).

Guo is a graduate of Liaoning's Northeastern University.

== Filmography ==
=== Television shows ===
Year	English title	Original title	Role	Notes
2018	Dunk of China	这！就是灌篮	Team leader	season 1
2019	Keep Running	奔跑吧	Guest star	season 7
2020	Amazing Dinner	未知的餐桌	Guest star	episode 1
2020	Dunk of China	这！就是灌篮	Team leader	season 3
2021	Roast	吐槽大会	Guest star	season 5 episode 7
