= 2017–18 Chinese Basketball Association season =

CBA
- Season: 2017–18
- Duration: 28 October 2017 – 1 May 2018
- Games played: 38
- Teams: 20

Regular season
- Top seed: Zhejiang Lions

Finals
- Champions: Liaoning Flying Leopards (1st title)
- Runners-up: Zhejiang Lions

Awards
- Domestic MVP: (China) Ding Yanyuhang
- International MVP: (United States) Courtney Fortson

Statistical leaders
Points	(United States) (Bulgaria) Darius Adams	40.1
Rebounds	(United States) Jared Sullinger	16.7
Assists	(United States) Courtney Fortson	12.0

The 2017–18 CBA season was the 23rd season of the Chinese Basketball Association (CBA). The regular season was initially scheduled to begin on Saturday, October 21, 2017, with the Guangdong Southern Tigers hosting the Shenzhen Leopards, but later rescheduled to Saturday, October 28, 2017, with the defending champion Xinjiang Flying Tigers hosting the Jilin Northeast Tigers. The regular season ended on Sunday, February 11, 2018, and the playoffs begin on Saturday, March 3, 2018.

In this season, the playoffs were expanded from eight to ten teams.

== Team changes ==
Two teams relocated and one of those teams was renamed ahead of the season.

=== City changes ===
- The Jiangsu Dragons relocated out of Nanjing and will play the majority of their home games in Suzhou with several contests hosted in Changzhou.

=== Name changes ===
- The Jiangsu Tongxi Monkey Kings moved from Changzhou to Nanjing and changed their name to the Nanjing Monkey Kings on September 29, 2017.

== Venues ==
Team	Home city	Arena	Capacity
Bayi Rockets	Ningbo	Beilun Gymnasium	6500
Beijing Ducks	Beijing	Cadillac Arena	18,000
Beijing Ducks	Beijing	Shougang Basketball Center	6000
Beikong Fly Dragons	Beijing	Olympic Sports Center Gymnasium	6300
Fujian Sturgeons	Jinjiang	Zuchang Gymnasium	6,000
Guangdong Southern Tigers	Dongguan	Nissan Sports Centre	14,730
Guangzhou Long-Lions	Guangzhou	Tianhe Gymnasium	8628
Guangzhou Long-Lions	Foshan	Nanhai Gymnasium	4000
Jiangsu Dragons	Suzhou	Suzhou Industrial Park Sports Center	13,000
Jiangsu Dragons	Suzhou	Suzhou Sports Center Gymnasium	N/A
Jiangsu Dragons	Changzhou	Changzhou Olympic Sports Center Gymnasium	6,200
Jilin Northeast Tigers	Changchun	Changchun Gymnasium	4,299
Liaoning Flying Leopards	Benxi	Benxi Gymnasium	4,500
Nanjing Monkey Kings	Nanjing	Nanjing Youth Olympic Sports Park	22,000
Nanjing Monkey Kings	Nanjing	Jiangning Sports Center Gymnasium	5,500
Qingdao Eagles	Qingdao	Guoxin Gymnasium	12,500
Qingdao Eagles	Qingdao	Gymnasium of Ocean University of China	4145
Shandong Golden Stars	Jinan	Shandong Arena	8,800
Shanghai Sharks	Shanghai	Pudong Yuanshen Gymnasium	5,000
Shanxi Brave Dragons	Taiyuan	Shanxi Sports Centre Gymnasium	8000
Shenzhen Leopards	Shenzhen	Shenzhen Dayun Arena	18,000
Shenzhen Leopards	Shenzhen	Bao'an Gymnasium	8188
Shenzhen Leopards	Zhongshan	Zhongshan Gymnasium	5000
Sichuan Blue Whales	Chengdu	Sichuan Provincial Gymnasium	9,200
Tianjin Gold Lions	Tianjin	Dongli Gymnasium	5630
Xinjiang Flying Tigers	Ürümqi	Hongshan Arena	3,800
Zhejiang Golden Bulls	Hangzhou	Binjiang Gymnasium	6000
Zhejiang Guangsha Lions	Hangzhou	Hangzhou Gymnasium	5,136

== Draft ==
The 2017 CBA Draft, the third edition of the CBA draft, took place on 2017 August 2. 11 players were selected in the draft.

Rnd.	Pick	Player	Nationality (Note: Nationality indicates the player's national team or representative nationality. If a player has not competed at the international level, then the nationality indicates the national team which the player is eligible to represent according to FIBA rules.)	Team	School / club team
1	1	Chen Ying-chun	Chinese Taipei	Guangzhou Long-Lions	Liberty University (United States)
1	2	Chou Yi-hsiang	Chinese Taipei	Nanjing Monkey Kings	Dacin Tigers (Chinese Taipei)
1	3	Duncan Reid	Hong Kong	Zhejiang Golden Bulls	SCAA (Hong Kong)
1	4	Yang Kai	China	Fujian Sturgeons	Hunan Yongsheng
1	5	Zhang Jin	China	Jilin Northeast Tigers	Liaoning Flying Leopards Youth
1	6	Ban Duo	China	Shanxi Brave Dragons	Tsinghua University
1	7	Liu Hongbo	China	Qingdao Eagles	Peking University
1	8	Liu Lei	China	Jiangsu Dragons	Tsinghua University
2	1	Qiao Wenhan	China	Nanjing Monkey Kings	Luoyang Zhonghe
2	2	Wang Zixu	China	Beikong Fly Dragons	Guangzhou Long-Lions Youth
2	3	Wang Yuyao	China	Shenzhen Leopards	Shenzhen Leopards Youth

== Foreign players policy ==
All teams except the Bayi Rockets can have two foreign players. The bottom 4 teams from the previous season (except Bayi) have the additional right to sign an extra Asian player.

=== Rules Chart ===
The rules for using foreign players in each game are described in this chart:

#	Facing other teams	Facing Bayi Rockets
Chinese players+	No Limit	No Limit
Asian players++	No Limit	4 quarters collectively+++
International players	6 quarters collectively+++	4 quarters collectively+++

+ Including players from Hong Kong and Taiwan.

++ If a team waives its right to sign an extra Asian player, it may use its 2 foreign players for 7 quarters collectively.

+++ Only 1 allowed in the 4th quarter.

=== Import chart ===
This is the full list of international players who competed in the CBA during the 2017-18 season.

Team	Player 1	Player 2	Asian Player	Replaced During Season
Bayi Rockets	–	–	–	–
Beijing Ducks	(United States) Aaron Jackson	(United States) (Croatia) Justin Hamilton	–	(United States) Marcus Thornton (United States) Randolph Morris (DNP)
Beikong Fly Dragons	(United States) Stephon Marbury	(United States) Shavlik Randolph	(Lebanon) Wael Arakji	(Jordan) Zaid Abbas
Fujian Sturgeons	(United States) Russ Smith	(United States) Mike Harris	–	-
Guangdong Southern Tigers	(United States) Donald Sloan	(Canada) Andrew Nicholson	–	(France) Edwin Jackson (United States) Darius Morris
Guangzhou Long-Lions	(United States) Kyle Fogg	(United States) Tyler Hansbrough	(Palestine) Sani Sakakini	(United States) Semaj Christon
Jiangsu Dragons	(United States) MarShon Brooks	(Serbia) Miroslav Raduljica	–	(United States) Jabari Brown
Jilin Northeast Tigers	(United States) Von Wafer	(United States) Carl Landry	–	–
Liaoning Flying Leopards	(United States) Lester Hudson	(United States) Brandon Bass	–	–
Nanjing Monkey Kings	(United States) Jeremy Pargo	(United States) JJ Hickson	(Iran) Samad Nikkhah Bahrami	(United States) Dominique Jones
Qingdao Eagles	(United States) Jonathan Gibson	(United States) (Central African Republic) James Mays	–	(United States) Terrence Jones (Poland) (Sweden) Maciej Lampe
Shandong Golden Stars	(United States) Ty Lawson	(Lithuania) Donatas Motiejūnas	–	–
Shanghai Sharks	(United States) Jimmer Fredette	(United States) Nick Minnerath	–	–
Shanxi Brave Dragons	(United States) Willie Warren	(Argentina) Luis Scola	–	(United States) Brandon Jennings
Shenzhen Leopards	(United States) (Montenegro) Tyrese Rice	(United States) Jared Sullinger	–	(United States) Keith Langford
Sichuan Blue Whales	(United States) (Nigeria) Ike Diogu	(Iran) Hamed Haddadi	–	(United States) Jamaal Franklin
Tianjin Gold Lions	(United States) (Ukraine) Eugene Jeter	(United States) Derrick Williams	–	(United States) Eli Holman
Xinjiang Flying Tigers	(United States) (Bulgaria) Darius Adams	(United States) (Philippines) Andray Blatche	–	(United States) Shawn Long (Brazil) (Spain) Augusto Lima
Zhejiang Golden Bulls	(United States) Sonny Weems	(United States) Arinze Onuaku	–	(United States) Jarnell Stokes
Zhejiang Lions	(United States) Courtney Fortson	(Greece) Ioannis Bourousis	–	–

== Regular Season Standings ==
#	2017–18 CBA season					
#	Team	W	L	PCT	Pts	Tiebreaker
1	Zhejiang Lions	31	7	.816	69	
2	Liaoning Flying Leopards	29	9	.763	67	
3	Guangdong Southern Tigers	28	10	.737	66	
4	Shandong Golden Stars	27	11	.711	65	
5	Jiangsu Dragons	26	12	.684	64	
6	Xinjiang Flying Tigers	25	13	.658	63	XJ 3-1; BJ 2-2; SZ 1-3
7	Beijing Ducks	25	13	.658	63	XJ 3-1; BJ 2-2; SZ 1-3
8	Shenzhen Leopards	25	13	.658	63	XJ 3-1; BJ 2-2; SZ 1-3
9	Guangzhou Long-Lions	21	17	.553	59	
10	Shanghai Sharks	20	18	.526	58	SH 1-1 (SH 200-187 ZJ)
11	Zhejiang Golden Bulls	20	18	.526	58	SH 1-1 (SH 200-187 ZJ)
12	Beikong Fly Dragons	18	20	.474	56	
13	Fujian Sturgeons	16	22	.421	54	FJ 1-1 (FJ 241-224 SX)
14	Shanxi Brave Dragons	16	22	.421	54	FJ 1-1 (FJ 241-224 SX)
15	Nanjing Monkey King	15	23	.395	53	
16	Qingdao Eagles	11	27	.289	49	
17	Jilin Northeast Tigers	8	30	.211	46	JL 3-1; TJ 2-2; SC 1-3
18	Tianjin Gold Lions	8	30	.211	46	JL 3-1; TJ 2-2; SC 1-3
19	Sichuan Blue Whales	8	30	.211	46	JL 3-1; TJ 2-2; SC 1-3
20	Bayi Rockets	3	35	.079	41	

Key to colors
Top 6 teams advance to the Playoffs
7th-10th teams advance to the pre-elimination Playoffs

== Playoffs ==
The 2018 CBA Playoffs began on 3 March 2018. Teams in bold advanced to the next round. The numbers to the left of each team indicate the team's seeding, and the numbers to the right indicate the number of games the team won in that round. Teams with home court advantage are shown in italics.

First round
8	**Shenzhen Leopards**	**2**
9	Guangzhou Long-Lions	0
7	**Beijing Ducks**	**2**
10	Shanghai Sharks	1

Quarterfinals
1	**Zhejiang Lions**	**3**
8	Shenzhen Leopards	2
4	**Shandong Golden Stars**	**3**
5	Jiangsu Dragons	0
2	**Liaoning Flying Leopards**	**3**
7	Beijing Ducks	1
3	**Guangdong Southern Tigers**	**3**
6	Xinjiang Flying Tigers	1

Semifinals
1	**Zhejiang Lions**	**4**
4	Shandong Golden Stars	3
2	**Liaoning Flying Leopards**	**4**
3	Guangdong Southern Tigers	1

Finals
1	Zhejiang Lions	0
2	**Liaoning Flying Leopards**	**4**

== Statistics ==
=== Individual statistic leaders ===
Category	Player	Team	Statistic
Points per game	(China) Ding Yanyuhang (Domestic Player) (United States) (Bulgaria) Darius Adams (International Player)	Shandong Golden Stars; Xinjiang Flying Tigers	28.0; 40.1
Rebounds per game	(China) Yi Jianlian (Domestic Player) (United States) Jared Sullinger (International Player)	Guangdong Southern Tigers; Shenzhen Leopards	13.3; 16.7
Assists per game	(China) Zeng Lingxu (Domestic Player) (United States) Courtney Fortson (International Player)	Shanxi Brave Dragons; Zhejiang Lions	7.6; 12.0
Steals per game	(China) Wu Qian (Domestic Player) (United States) (Bulgaria) Darius Adams (International Player)	Zhejiang Golden Bulls; Xinjiang Flying Tigers	2.2; 2.7
Blocks per game	(China) Zhang Zhaoxu (Domestic Player) (United States) (Croatia) Justin Hamilton (International Player)	Shanghai Sharks; Beijing Ducks	2.2; 1.8

== Awards ==
=== Players of the Week ===
The following players were named the Players of the Week.

Week	Domestic Player of the Week	International Player of the Week	Ref.
October 28–November 5	Yi Jianlian (Guangdong Southern Tigers) (1/3)	Jared Sullinger (Shenzhen Leopards) (1/3)	
November 7–12	Ding Yanyuhang (Shandong Golden Stars) (1/1)	Jimmer Fredette (Shanghai Sharks) (1/1)	
November 14–17	Hu Jinqiu (Zhejiang Lions) (1/5)	Eli Holman (Tianjin Gold Lions) (1/1)	
November 29–December 10	Hu Jinqiu (Zhejiang Lions) (2/5)	Jared Sullinger (Shenzhen Leopards) (2/3)	
December 12–17	Hu Jinqiu (Zhejiang Lions) (3/5)	Courtney Fortson (Zhejiang Lions) (1/2)	
December 19–24	Hu Jinqiu (Zhejiang Lions) (4/5)	Russ Smith (Fujian Sturgeons) (1/1)	
December 26–31	Hu Jinqiu (Zhejiang Lions) (5/5)	Courtney Fortson (Zhejiang Lions) (2/2)	
January 2–11	Han Dejun (Liaoning Flying Leopards) (1/1)	Darius Adams (Xinjiang Flying Tigers) (1/3)	
January 16–21	Yi Jianlian (Guangdong Southern Tigers) (2/3)	Jared Sullinger (Shenzhen Leopards) (3/3)	
January 23–28	Yi Jianlian (Guangdong Southern Tigers) (3/3)	Darius Adams (Xinjiang Flying Tigers) (2/3)	
January 30–February 4	Wang Zhelin (Fujian Sturgeons) (1/2)	Donatas Motiejūnas (Shandong Golden Stars) (1/1)	
February 6–11	Wang Zhelin (Fujian Sturgeons) (2/2)	Darius Adams (Xinjiang Flying Tigers) (3/3)	

=== Young Player of the Month ===
The following players were named the Young Player of the Month.

Month	Young Player of the Month	Ref.
October/November	Zhao Rui (Guangdong Southern Tigers) (1/1)	
December	Gao Shiyan (Jilin Northeast Tigers) (1/1)	
January/February	Hu Jinqiu (Zhejiang Lions) (1/1)	
