= 2021–22 Chinese Basketball Association season =

CBA
- Season: 2021–22
- Duration: 16 October–14 November 2021; 25 December 2021–28 January 2022; 1–22 March 2022 (Regular season); 1–26 April 2022 (Playoffs)
- Games played: 38
- Teams: 20

Regular season
- Season MVP: Hu Jinqiu (Zhejiang)

Finals
- Champions: Liaoning Flying Leopards
- Runners-up: Zhejiang Lions
- Semifinalists: Guangdong Southern Tigers; Shanghai Sharks
- Finals MVP: Zhao Jiwei (Liaoning)

The 2021–22 CBA season was the 27th season of the Chinese Basketball Association (CBA). The regular season was reduced to 38 games for each team and was divided into three stages. The first stage, which was played in Zhuji, Zhejiang, began on 16 October 2021 and ended on 14 November 2021. The second stage, which was played in Changchun, Jilin, began on 25 December 2021 and ended on 28 January 2022. The third stage, which was played in Foshan, Guangdong and Shenyang, Liaoning, began on 1 March 2022 and ended on 22 March 2022. The playoffs, which were played in Nanchang, Jiangxi, began on 1 April 2022 and ended on 26 April 2022.

== Teams ==
Team	Head coach	Home city	Arena	Capacity	Ref.
Beijing Ducks	(Greece) Yannis Christopoulos	Beijing	Cadillac Center	17,178	
Beijing Royal Fighters	(United States) Stephon Marbury	Beijing	Olympic Sports Center Gymnasium	6,500	
Fujian Sturgeons	(China) Cui Wanjun	Jinjiang	Zuchang Gymnasium	4,500	
Guangdong Southern Tigers	(China) Du Feng	Dongguan	Dongguan Basketball Center	16,000	
Guangzhou Loong Lions	(China) Guo Shiqiang	Guangzhou	Tianhe Gymnasium	8,000	
Jiangsu Dragons	(China) Li Nan	Suzhou	Suzhou Sports Center Gymnasium	6,000	
Jilin Northeast Tigers	(China) Wang Han	Changchun	Changchun Gymnasium	4,000	
Liaoning Flying Leopards	(China) Yang Ming	Shenyang	Liaoning Gymnasium	12,000	
Nanjing Monkey Kings	(China) Ma Zhuang (caretaker)	Nanjing	Wutaishan Gymnasium	9,300	
Ningbo Rockets	(China) Li Ke	Ningbo	Ningbo Youngor Gynmasium		
Qingdao Eagles	(China) Wu Qinglong	Qingdao	Conson Gymnasium	12,500	
Shandong Hi-Speed Kirin	(China) Xu Changsuo	Jinan	Shandong Arena	8,000	
Shanghai Sharks	(China) Li Chunjiang	Shanghai	Yuanshen Sports Centre Gymnasium	5,091	
Shanxi Loongs	(China) Yang Xuezeng	Taiyuan	Shanxi Sports Centre Gymnasium	8,131	
Shenzhen Leopards	(China) Qiu Biao	Shenzhen	Shenzhen Dayun Arena	18,000	
Sichuan Blue Whales	(China) Zhou Jinli	Chengdu	Wenjiang Gymnasium	4,500	
Tianjin Pioneers	(China) Zhang Degui	Tianjin	TUFE Gymnasium	4,000	
Xinjiang Flying Tigers	(China) Adiljan Jun	Ürümqi	Hongshan Arena	4,000	
Zhejiang Golden Bulls	(China) Liu Weiwei	Hangzhou	Binjiang Gymnasium	5,000	
Zhejiang Lions	(China) Wang Bo	Zhuji	Zhuji Jiyang Sports Center Gymnasium	6,077	

=== Team changes ===
New team

- Ningbo Rockets

== Draft ==
The 2021 CBA Draft, the seventh edition of the CBA draft, took place on 18 July 2021 in Qingdao, Shandong.

== Foreign players ==
This is the full list of international players competing in the CBA during the 2021–22 season.

Team	Player 1	Player 2	Player 3	Player 4	Replaced
Beijing Ducks	(United States) Barry Brown Jr.	(United States) (Croatia) Justin Hamilton	(United States) Jonathan Gibson	(United States) Jeremy Lin	-
Beijing Royal Fighters	(United States) Isaac Haas	(United States) Sylven Landesberg	(Montenegro) Marko Todorović	-	-
Fujian Sturgeons	(United States) Trae Golden	-	-	-	-
Guangdong Southern Tigers	(United States) Ricky Ledo	(United States) Sonny Weems	-	-	-
Guangzhou Loong Lions	(United States) Nate Mason	(United States) (Israel) T. J. Leaf	-	-	-
Jiangsu Dragons	-	-	-	-	-
Jilin Northeast Tigers	(United States) Dominique Jones	-	-	-	-
Liaoning Flying Leopards	(United States) Kyle Fogg	(United States) Eric Moreland	-	-	-
Nanjing Monkey Kings	(United States) D'Montre Edwards	-	-	-	-
Ningbo Rockets	(United States) Clarence Trotter III	(Serbia) Vladimir Štimac	-	-	-
Qingdao Eagles	(United States) Dakari Johnson	(United States) Dez Wells	-	-	-
Shandong Hi-Speed Kirin	(United States) Troy Gillenwater	(United States) Lester Hudson	-	-	-
Shanghai Sharks	(United States) Jamaal Franklin	(United States) Noah Vonleh	-	-	-
Shanxi Loongs	(United States) Kay Felder	(United States) Jonathon Simmons	-	-	-
Shenzhen Leopards	(United States) Askia Booker	(United States) Jared Sullinger	-	-	-
Sichuan Blue Whales	(Iran) Hamed Haddadi	(United States) Sterling Manley	-	-	-
Tianjin Pioneers	(United States) Kenny Boynton	(United States) Taylor Rochestie	-	-	-
Xinjiang Flying Tigers	(United States) Arnett Moultrie	-	-	-	-
Zhejiang Golden Bulls	(United States) Erick Green	(United States) (Serbia) Nick Rakocevic	-	-	-
Zhejiang Lions	(United States) Jarrod Jones	(United States) Jahlil Okafor	-	-	-

== Regular season ==
=== League table ===
#	2021–22 CBA regular season				
#	Team	W	L	Pct.	Tiebreaker
1	Liaoning Flying Leopards	32	6	.842	
2	Zhejiang Lions	31	7	.816	
3	Shanghai Sharks	28	10	.737	
4	Zhejiang Golden Bulls	28	10	.737	
5	Guangdong Southern Tigers	26	12	.684	
6	Shenzhen Leopards	26	12	.684	
7	Beijing Ducks	24	14	.632	
8	Guangzhou Loong Lions	23	15	.605	
9	Shanxi Loongs	23	15	.605	
10	Jilin Northeast Tigers	22	16	.579	
11	Shandong Hi-Speed Kirin	20	18	.526	
12	Tianjin Pioneers	19	19	.500	
13	Beijing Royal Fighters	18	20	.474	
14	Xinjiang Flying Tigers	18	20	.474	
15	Qingdao Eagles	13	25	.342	
16	Sichuan Blue Whales	12	26	.316	
17	Fujian Sturgeons	7	31	.184	
18	Jiangsu Dragons	5	33	.132	
19	Ningbo Rockets	3	35	.079	
20	Nanjing Monkey Kings	2	36	.053	

Key to colors
Top 4 teams advance directly to Quarter-finals of CBA Playoffs
5th-12th place teams progress to First Round of CBA Playoffs

=== Results ===
The regular season was reduced to 38 games for each team. 20 teams will play against each other twice.

Home \ Away	BJD	BJR	FJS	GDS	GZL	JSD	JLN	LNF	NJM	NBR	QDE	SDK	SHS	SXL	SZL	SCB	TJP	XJF	ZJG	ZJL
Beijing Ducks		83–79	106–86	80–92	84–56	86–69	105–76	99–76	119–78	106–70	89–78	89–96	109–103	112–118	91–99	98–69	114–126	106–65	89–81	88–99
Beijing Royal Fighters	81–97		109–92	106–93	119–111	114–82	87–88	80–85	101–80	95–79	94–88	93–105	83–102	97–102	89–101	91–83	116–105	112–116	90–102	74–101
Fujian Sturgeons	113–111	79–112		104–108	75–98	97–88	99–110	83–109	118–94	117–111	116–105	115–143	76–126	131–142	78–103	80–101	85–105	134–140	90–100	84–109
Guangdong Southern Tigers	67–91	109–80	98–91		98–89	108–73	99–95	95–115	101–87	111–88	98–91	127–101	101–108	99–125	106–83	111–108	118–91	118–99	110–94	94–114
Guangzhou Loong Lions	74–108	102–98	125–107	120–101		90–84	107–104	89–107	100–88	93–70	108–97	116–106	84–103	111–105	104–119	103–110	98–113	123–105	82–92	103–108
Jiangsu Dragons	71–87	74–91	101–109	84–97	72–80		95–109	95–108	99–91	102–104	82–79	87–93	94–109	84–111	80–90	97–94	96–90	93–98	68–108	88–110
Jilin Northeast Tigers	75–106	73–93	104–99	99–116	94–95	99–82		89–117	91–79	111–86	120–100	98–83	118–108	104–87	106–103	101–86	99–101	88–86	115–111	101–94
Liaoning Flying Leopards	103–95	97–86	128–109	102–90	110–98	101–75	103–88		114–103	118–102	85–108	114–97	100–102	129–97	92–90	134–90	112–93	87–109	101–82	102–94
Nanjing Monkey Kings	77–114	101–108	98–130	86–101	101–115	95–80	81–112	109–129		92–108	98–119	90–102	91–131	90–122	102–122	106–110	103–124	84–120	78–127	90–108
Ningbo Rockets	84–118	96–124	109–106	80–106	105–125	66–89	95–107	70–99	73–97		83–110	75–111	85–119	85–110	94–121	78–105	88–110	91–114	64–99	75–121
Qingdao Eagles	73–78	100–80	99–91	90–103	117–100	91–86	80–98	101–111	104–82	119–78		98–104	107–110	110–105	92–102	100–93	106–101	100–119	88–93	89–121
Shandong Hi-Speed Kirin	112–103	95–105	113–102	111–110	89–107	105–100	93–87	87–98	107–89	114–92	112–105		97–125	107–114	106–111	101–102	114–117	89–103	94–100	97–94
Shanghai Sharks	105–86	118–104	117–93	97–112	105–101	107–74	94–81	101–121	134–110	119–93	121–88	100–117		135–111	108–118	115–97	120–94	121–96	112–103	80–122
Shanxi Loongs	90–115	105–94	120–109	96–111	97–99	114–84	119–91	107–99	116–100	105–92	98–85	112–116	151–128		119–113	117–99	130–123	93–101	106–146	103–113
Shenzhen Leopards	104–97	107–126	100–93	90–106	114–120	107–85	102–103	80–93	120–84	103–81	98–97	118–115	119–103	126–110		126–107	131–104	115–116	100–94	106–105
Sichuan Blue Whales	66–101	78–93	100–90	76–110	71–92	100–84	91–104	85–121	96–84	111–106	98–87	83–94	84–118	101–119	96–125		96–94	103–109	78–104	80–110
Tianjin Pioneers	96–112	115–93	106–87	98–110	106–110	97–77	107–99	88–106	121–101	113–98	91–79	134–124	75–110	113–109	94–122	115–86		120–102	89–128	84–105
Xinjiang Flying Tigers	111–100	84–91	145–116	109–107	102–117	125–97	96–117	99–109	92–86	109–79	92–89	96–106	112–121	97–112	104–105	97–102	124–119		102–107	69–108
Zhejiang Golden Bulls	96–73	96–84	108–85	124–101	104–113	112–76	115–100	97–96	124–92	114–100	105–98	113–86	85–91	111–109	90–78	111–81	104–81	98–91		101–104
Zhejiang Lions	94–91	110–83	125–111	98–86	93–67	97–80	102–92	100–112	117–95	99–92	96–103	112–92	101–95	118–122	118–84	106–57	125–94	109–100	107–95	

Source: Results
Legend: Blue = home team win; Red = away team win.
Matches with lighter background shading were decided after overtime.

== Playoffs ==
=== Bracket ===
First round Best-of-three
8	Guangzhou Loong Lions	1
9	Shanxi Loongs	2
5	Guangdong Southern Tigers	2
12	Tianjin Pioneers	0
6	Shenzhen Leopards	2
11	Shandong Hi-Speed Kirin	0
7	Beijing Ducks	0
10	Jilin Northeast Tigers	2

Quarter-finals; Best-of-three
1	Liaoning Flying Leopards	2
9	Shanxi Loongs	0
4	Zhejiang Golden Bulls	0
5	Guangdong Southern Tigers	2
3	Shanghai Sharks	2
6	Shenzhen Leopards	0
2	Zhejiang Lions	2
10	Jilin Northeast Tigers	0

Semi-finals; Best-of-five
1	Liaoning Flying Leopards	3
5	Guangdong Southern Tigers	0
3	Shanghai Sharks	0
2	Zhejiang Lions	3

Finals; Best-of-seven
1	Liaoning Flying Leopards	4
2	Zhejiang Lions	0

- Bold Series winner

=== First round ===
==== (5) Guangdong Southern Tigers vs. (12) Tianjin Pioneers ====
1 April 2022
15:00

[ Boxscore]

Guangdong Southern Tigers	124–101	Tianjin Pioneers
Scoring by quarter: –, –, –, –
Guangdong leads series, 1–0

Nanchang International Sport Center, Nanchang

3 April 2022
19:35

[ Boxscore]

Tianjin Pioneers	104–122	Guangdong Southern Tigers
Scoring by quarter: –, –, –, –
Guangdong wins series, 2–0

Nanchang International Sport Center, Nanchang

==== (6) Shenzhen Leopards vs. (11) Shandong Hi-Speed Kirin ====
2 April 2022
15:00

[ Boxscore]

Shenzhen Leopards	115–101	Shandong Hi-Speed Kirin
Scoring by quarter: –, –, –, –
Shenzhen leads series, 1–0

Nanchang International Sport Center, Nanchang

4 April 2022
19:35

[ Boxscore]

Shandong Hi-Speed Kirin	108–120	Shenzhen Leopards
Scoring by quarter: –, –, –, –
Shenzhen wins series, 2–0

Nanchang International Sport Center, Nanchang

==== (7) Beijing Ducks vs. (10) Jilin Northeast Tigers ====
2 April 2022
19:35

[ Boxscore]

Beijing Ducks	102–104	Jilin Northeast Tigers
Scoring by quarter: –, –, –, –
Jilin leads series, 1–0

Nanchang International Sport Center, Nanchang

4 April 2022
15:00

[ Boxscore]

Jilin Northeast Tigers	80–75	Beijing Ducks
Scoring by quarter: –, –, –, –
Jilin wins series, 2–0

Nanchang International Sport Center, Nanchang

==== (8) Guangzhou Loong Lions vs. (9) Shanxi Loongs ====
1 April 2022
19:35

[ Boxscore]

Guangzhou Loong Lions	101–120	Shanxi Loongs
Scoring by quarter: –, –, –, –
Shanxi leads series, 1–0

Nanchang International Sport Center, Nanchang

3 April 2022
15:00

[ Boxscore]

Shanxi Loongs	95–106	Guangzhou Loong Lions
Scoring by quarter: –, –, –, –
Series tied, 1–1

Nanchang International Sport Center, Nanchang

5 April 2022
19:35

[ Boxscore]

Guangzhou Loong Lions	93–114	Shanxi Loongs
Scoring by quarter: –, –, –, –
Shanxi wins series, 2–1

Nanchang International Sport Center, Nanchang

=== Quarter-finals ===
==== (1) Liaoning Flying Leopards vs. (9) Shanxi Loongs ====
7 April 2022
15:00

[ Boxscore]

Liaoning Flying Leopards	116–104	Shanxi Loongs
Scoring by quarter: –, –, –, –
Liaoning leads series, 1–0

Nanchang International Sport Center, Nanchang

9 April 2022
19:35

[ Boxscore]

Shanxi Loongs	109–115	Liaoning Flying Leopards
Scoring by quarter: –, –, –, –
Liaoning wins series, 2–0

Nanchang International Sport Center, Nanchang

==== (2) Zhejiang Lions vs. (10) Jilin Northeast Tigers ====
8 April 2022
15:00

[ Boxscore]

Zhejiang Lions	93–84	Jilin Northeast Tigers
Scoring by quarter: –, –, –, –
Zhejiang leads series, 1–0

Nanchang International Sport Center, Nanchang

10 April 2022
19:35

[ Boxscore]

Jilin Northeast Tigers	100–110	Zhejiang Lions
Scoring by quarter: –, –, –, –
Zhejiang wins series, 2–0

Nanchang International Sport Center, Nanchang

==== (3) Shanghai Sharks vs. (6) Shenzhen Leopards ====
8 April 2022
19:35

[ Boxscore]

Shanghai Sharks	120–118	Shenzhen Leopards
Scoring by quarter: –, –, –, –
Shanghai leads series, 1–0

Nanchang International Sport Center, Nanchang

10 April 2022
15:00

[ Boxscore]

Shenzhen Leopards	82–87	Shanghai Sharks
Scoring by quarter: –, –, –, –
Shanghai wins series, 2–0

Nanchang International Sport Center, Nanchang

==== (4) Zhejiang Golden Bulls vs. (5) Guangdong Southern Tigers ====
7 April 2022
19:35

[ Boxscore]

Zhejiang Golden Bulls	98–99	Guangdong Southern Tigers
Scoring by quarter: –, –, –, –
Guangdong leads series, 1–0

Nanchang International Sport Center, Nanchang

9 April 2022
15:00

[ Boxscore]

Guangdong Southern Tigers	97–82	Zhejiang Golden Bulls
Scoring by quarter: –, –, –, –
Guangdong wins series, 2–0

Nanchang International Sport Center, Nanchang

=== Semi-finals ===
==== (1) Liaoning Flying Leopards vs. (5) Guangdong Southern Tigers ====
12 April 2022
19:35

[ Boxscore]

Liaoning Flying Leopards	92–79	Guangdong Southern Tigers
Scoring by quarter: –, –, –, –
Liaoning leads series, 1–0

Nanchang International Sport Center, Nanchang

14 April 2022
19:35

[ Boxscore]

Liaoning Flying Leopards	96–83	Guangdong Southern Tigers
Scoring by quarter: –, –, –, –
Liaoning leads series, 2–0

Nanchang International Sport Center, Nanchang

16 April 2022
19:35

[ Boxscore]

Guangdong Southern Tigers	116–117	Liaoning Flying Leopards
Scoring by quarter: –, –, –, –
Liaoning wins series, 3–0

Nanchang International Sport Center, Nanchang

==== (2) Zhejiang Lions vs. (3) Shanghai Sharks ====
13 April 2022
19:35

[ Boxscore]

Zhejiang Lions	108–93	Shanghai Sharks
Scoring by quarter: –, –, –, –
Zhejiang leads series, 1–0

Nanchang International Sport Center, Nanchang

15 April 2022
19:35

[ Boxscore]

Zhejiang Lions	106–96	Shanghai Sharks
Scoring by quarter: –, –, –, –
Zhejiang leads series, 2–0

Nanchang International Sport Center, Nanchang

17 April 2022
19:35

[ Boxscore]

Shanghai Sharks	100–103	Zhejiang Lions
Scoring by quarter: –, –, –, –
Zhejiang wins series, 3–0

Nanchang International Sport Center, Nanchang

=== Finals ===
==== (1) Liaoning Flying Leopards vs. (2) Zhejiang Lions ====
20 April 2022
19:35

[ Boxscore]

Liaoning Flying Leopards	98–75	Zhejiang Lions
Scoring by quarter: –, –, –, –
Liaoning leads series, 1–0

Nanchang International Sport Center, Nanchang

22 April 2022
19:35

[ Boxscore]

Liaoning Flying Leopards	99–90	Zhejiang Lions
Scoring by quarter: –, –, –, –
Liaoning leads series, 2–0

Nanchang International Sport Center, Nanchang

24 April 2022
19:35

[ Boxscore]

Zhejiang Lions	73–87	Liaoning Flying Leopards
Scoring by quarter: –, –, –, –
Liaoning leads series, 3–0

Nanchang International Sport Center, Nanchang

26 April 2022
19:35

[ Boxscore]

Zhejiang Lions	82–100	Liaoning Flying Leopards
Scoring by quarter: –, –, –, –
Liaoning wins series, 4–0

Nanchang International Sport Center, Nanchang

== All-Star Weekend ==
jeremy lin

== Awards ==
Category	Player	Team(s)	Ref.
Most Valuable Player	Hu Jinqiu	Zhejiang Lions	
Finals MVP	Zhao Jiwei	Liaoning Flying Leopards	
