= 2016–17 Chinese Basketball Association season =

CBA
- Season: 2016–17
- Duration: October 29, 2016 – February 19, 2017 (regular season） February 24, 2017 – March 19, 2017 (Playoffs); March 31, 2017 – April 16, 2017 (Finals)
- Games played: 38
- Teams: 20

Regular season
- Top seed: Xinjiang Flying Tigers

Finals
- Champions: Xinjiang Flying Tigers
- Runners-up: Guangdong Southern Tigers
- Semifinalists: Liaoning Flying Leopards; Shenzhen Leopards

Awards
- Domestic MVP: (China) Ding Yanyuhang
- International MVP: (United States) Jimmer Fredette

Statistical leaders
Points	(United States) Errick McCollum	37.5
Rebounds	(United States) Malcolm Thomas	16.4
Assists	(United States) Jamaal Franklin	8.8

The 2016–17 CBA season is the 22nd season of the Chinese Basketball Association.

The regular season began on Saturday, October 29, 2016, with the defending champion Sichuan Blue Whales hosting the Beikong Fly Dragons.

The regular season ends on Sunday, February 19, 2017, and the playoffs begin on Friday, February 24, 2017.

== Team changes ==
One team relocated ahead of the season.

=== Name Changes ===
- The Foshan Long-Lions moved to Guangzhou and changed their name to Guangzhou Long-Lions on September 23, 2016.

== Foreign Players Policy ==
All teams except the Bayi Rockets can have two foreign players. The bottom 4 teams from the previous season (except Bayi) have the additional right to sign an extra Asian player.

=== Rules Chart ===
The rules for using foreign players in each game are described in this chart:

#	Facing other teams	Facing Bayi Rockets
Chinese players+	No Limit	No Limit
Asian players++	No Limit	4 quarters collectively+++
International players	6 quarters collectively+++	4 quarters collectively+++

+ Including players from Hong Kong and Taiwan.

++ If a team waives its right to sign an extra Asian player, it may use its 2 foreign players for 7 quarters collectively.

+++ Only 1 allowed in the 4th quarter.

=== Import Chart ===
This is the full list of international players who competed in the CBA during the 2016-17 season.

Team	Player 1	Player 2	Asian Player	Replaced During Season
Bayi Rockets	–	–	–	–
Beijing Ducks	(United States) Stephon Marbury	(United States) Grant Jerrett	–	(United States) Randolph Morris
Beikong Fly Dragons	(United States) Errick McCollum	(Uruguay) Esteban Batista	–	–
Fujian Sturgeons	(United States) Dwight Buycks	(United States) J. J. Hickson	–	(United States) Sebastian Telfair
Guangdong Southern Tigers	(United States) Donald Sloan	(United States) Carlos Boozer	–	–
Guangzhou Long-Lions	(United States) D. J. Kennedy	(United States) Alex Stepheson	(Iran) Samad Nikkhah Bahrami	(United States) Ryan Boatright (United States) Alex Kirk
Jiangsu Dragons	(United States) MarShon Brooks	(United States) Will McDonald	–	(Jamaica) Samardo Samuels
Jiangsu Monkey King	(United States) Jared Cunningham	(Nigeria) (United States) Ike Diogu	(Jordan) Zaid Abbas	(United States) DeJuan Blair
Jilin Northeast Tigers	(United States) Jabari Brown	(United States) Malcolm Thomas	(Iran) Mehdi Kamrani	–
Liaoning Flying Leopards	(United States) Lester Hudson	(United States) Shavlik Randolph	–	–
Qingdao Eagles	(United States) Dominique Jones	(Greece) Loukas Mavrokefalidis	–	(United States) Jerrelle Benimon
Shandong Golden Stars	(United States) A. J. Price	(United States) Jason Thompson	–	(United States) Norris Cole (United States) Justin Dentmon
Shanghai Sharks	(United States) Jimmer Fredette	(France) Guerschon Yabusele	–	–
Shanxi Brave Dragons	(United States) Jamaal Franklin	(Haiti) (Canada) Samuel Dalembert	–	(United States) Henry Sims
Shenzhen Leopards	(United States) Jeremy Pargo	(Poland) (Sweden) Maciej Lampe	–	–
Sichuan Blue Whales	(Iran) Hamed Haddadi	(United States) Mike Harris	–	(United States) Josh Smith
Tianjin Gold Lions	(United States) (Ukraine) Eugene Jeter	(United States) Jeremy Tyler	(Palestine) Sani Sakakini	–
Xinjiang Flying Tigers	(United States) (Bulgaria) Darius Adams	(United States) (Philippines) Andray Blatche	–	(Ghana) Ben Bentil
Zhejiang Golden Bulls	(United States) Willie Warren	(United States) Lorenzo Brown	–	(Haiti) Cady Lalanne
Zhejiang Guangsha Lions	(United States) Courtney Fortson	(United States) Eli Holman	–	–

== Regular season standings ==
#	2016–17 CBA season					
#	Team	W	L	PCT	Pts	Tiebreaker
1	Xinjiang Flying Tigers	32	6	.833	70	
2	Guangdong Southern Tigers	30	8	.778	68	
3	Shanghai Sharks	30	8	.806	68	
4	Zhejiang Lions	30	8	.778	68	
5	Liaoning Flying Leopards	29	9	.778	67	
6	Shenzhen Leopards	23	15	.667	61	
7	Sichuan Blue Whales	23	15	.583	61	
8	Shandong Golden Stars	22	16	.583	60	
9	Beijing Ducks	21	17	.556	59	
10	Jiangsu Dragons	20	18	.556	58	
11	Tianjin Gold Lions	18	20	.500	56	
12	Qingdao Eagles	16	22	.444	54	
13	Shanxi Brave Dragons	16	22	.389	54	
14	Jilin Northeast Tigers	14	24	.333	52	
15	Fujian Sturgeons	12	26	.306	50	
16	Zhejiang Golden Bulls	10	28	.278	48	
17	Beikong Fly Dragons	9	29	.250	47	
18	Jiangsu Monkey King	8	30	.222	46	
19	Guangzhou Long-Lions	7	31	.194	45	
20	Bayi Rockets	7	31	.167	45	

Key to colors
Top 8 teams advance to the Playoffs

== Playoffs ==
The 2017 CBA Playoffs began on February 24 and ended on April 7, 2017.

First Round; 24 February–3 March
1	Xinjiang Flying Tigers	3
8	Shandong Golden Stars	1
4	Zhejiang Lions	1
5	Liaoning Flying Leopards	3
2	Guangdong Southern Tigers	3
7	Sichuan Blue Whales	0
3	Shanghai Sharks	2
6	Shenzhen Leopards	3

Semifinals; 10–19 March
1	Xinjiang Flying Tigers	4
5	Liaoning Flying Leopards	1
2	Guangdong Southern Tigers	4
6	Shenzhen Leopards	1

Finals; 31 March–7 April
1	Xinjiang Flying Tigers	4
2	Guangdong Southern Tigers	0

- Bold Series winner
- Italics Team with home-court advantage
