= 2018 CBA Playoffs =

The 2018 CBA Playoffs was the postseason tournament of the Chinese Basketball Association's 2017–18 season. It began on 3 March 2018. In this season, the playoffs were expanded from 8 teams to 10 teams.

== Bracket ==
Teams in bold advanced to the next round. The numbers to the left of each team indicate the team's seeding, and the numbers to the right indicate the number of games the team won in that round. Teams with home court advantage are shown in italics.

First round
8	**Shenzhen Leopards**	**2**
9	Guangzhou Long-Lions	0
7	**Beijing Ducks**	**2**
10	Shanghai Sharks	1

Quarterfinals
1	**Zhejiang Lions**	**3**
8	Shenzhen Leopards	2
4	**Shandong Golden Stars**	**3**
5	Jiangsu Dragons	0
2	**Liaoning Flying Leopards**	**3**
7	Beijing Ducks	1
3	**Guangdong Southern Tigers**	**3**
6	Xinjiang Flying Tigers	1

Semifinals
1	**Zhejiang Lions**	**4**
4	Shandong Golden Stars	3
2	**Liaoning Flying Leopards**	**4**
3	Guangdong Southern Tigers	1

Finals
1	Zhejiang Lions	0
2	**Liaoning Flying Leopards**	**4**

== Pre-elimination Playoffs ==
All times are in China standard time (UTC+8)

=== (8) Shenzhen Leopards vs. (9) Guangzhou Long-Lions ===
March 3
19:35

**Shenzhen Leopards 121**, Guangzhou Long-Lions 113
Scoring by quarter: 30–30, **35**–23, 26–**34**, **30**–26
**Shenzhen leads series, 1–0**

Shenzhen Dayun Arena, Shenzhen, Guangdong

March 6
19:35

Guangzhou Long-Lions 112, **Shenzhen Leopards 116**
Scoring by quarter: 28–**30**, **28**–21, 23–**30**, 33–**35**
**Shenzhen win series, 2–0**

Tianhe Gymnasium, Guangzhou, Guangdong

=== (7) Beijing Ducks vs. (10) Shanghai Sharks ===
March 4
19:35

Beijing Ducks 95, **Shanghai Sharks 104**
Scoring by quarter: **15**–14, 21–21, 35–**36**, 24–**33**
**Shanghai leads series, 1–0**

Cadillac Arena, Beijing

March 7
19:35

Shanghai Sharks 95, **Beijing Ducks 101**
Scoring by quarter: 20–20, 22–**29**, 27–**30**, **26**–22
**series tied, 1–1**

Pudong Yuanshen Sports Centre, Shanghai

March 10
19:35

**Beijing Ducks 97**, Shanghai Sharks 72
Scoring by quarter: **28**–24, **23**–22, **27**–8, **19**–18
**Beijing win series, 2–1**

Cadillac Arena, Beijing

== First round ==
=== (1) Zhejiang Lions vs. (8) Shenzhen Leopards ===
March 13
20:00

Shenzhen Leopards 119, **Zhejiang Lions 122**
Scoring by quarter: 27–**31**, **31**–24, **32**–28, 29–**39**
**Zhejiang leads series, 1–0**

Shenzhen Dayun Arena, Shenzhen, Guangdong

March 16
19:35

Zhejiang Lions 102, **Shenzhen Leopards 106**
Scoring by quarter: 22–**29**, 20–**32**, **27**–22, **33**–23
**series tied, 1–1**

Hangzhou Gymnasium, Hangzhou, Zhejiang

March 18
19:35

**Zhejiang Lions 101**, Shenzhen Leopards 89
Scoring by quarter: **26**–13, 15–**19**, **35**–25, 25–**32**
**Zhejiang leads series, 2–1**

Hangzhou Gymnasium, Hangzhou, Zhejiang

March 21
19:35

**Shenzhen Leopards 100**, Zhejiang Lions 95
Scoring by quarter: **30**–16, 19–**27**, 26–**30**, **25**–22
**series tied, 2–2**

Shenzhen Dayun Arena, Shenzhen, Guangdong

March 23
19:35

**Zhejiang Lions** **107**, Shenzhen Leopards 98
Scoring by quarter: 20–**26**, **38**–11, **32**–29, 17–**32**
**Zhejiang win series, 3–2**

Hangzhou Gymnasium, Hangzhou, Zhejiang

=== (4) Shandong Golden Stars vs. (5) Jiangsu Dragons ===
March 13
19:35

Jiangsu Dragons 100, **Shandong Golden Stars 104**
Scoring by quarter: 25–**27**, 29–**30**, **23**–20, 23–**26**
Pts: Marshon Brooks 27; Rebs: Miroslav Raduljica 13; Asts: Marshon Brooks 8	Pts: Ding Yanyuhang 33; Rebs: Jia Cheng 9 Asts: three players; 2
**Shandong leads series, 1–0**

Changzhou Olympic Sports Centre, Changzhou, Jiangsu

March 16
19:35

**Shandong Golden Stars 111**, Jiangsu Dragons 91
Scoring by quarter: **33**–21, **28**–25, 19–**24**, **31**–21
Pts: Donatas Motiejunas 28; Rebs: Donatas Motiejunas 16; Asts: Ding Yanyuhang 9	Pts: Marshon Brooks 30; Rebs: Miroslav Raduljica 16; Asts: three players 2
**Shandong leads series, 2–0**

Shandong Arena, Jinan, Shandong

March 18
19:35

**Shandong Golden Stars 127**, Jiangsu Dragons 104
Scoring by quarter: **25**–18, **36**–28, **35**–33, **31**–25
Pts: Ding Yanyuhang 27; Rebs: Donatas Motiejunas 13; Asts: Ty Lawson 11	Pts: Wu Quanxi 22; Rebs: Marshon Brooks 8 Asts: Marshon Brooks 7
**Shandong win series, 3–0**

Shandong Arena, Jinan, Shandong

=== (2) Liaoning Flying Leopards vs. (7) Beijing Ducks ===
March 14
19:35

Beijing Ducks 91, **Liaoning Flying Leopards 92**
Scoring by quarter: **29**–22, 24–**27**, 21–**25**, 17–**18**
**Liaoning leads series, 1–0**

Cadillac Arena, Beijing

March 17
19:35

Liaoning Flying Leopards 87, **Beijing Ducks 95**
Scoring by quarter: 15–**16**, 18–**25**, 27–**31**, **27**–23
**series tied, 1–1**

Benxi Gymnasium, Benxi, Liaoning

March 19
19:35

**Liaoning Flying Leopards 123**, Beijing Ducks 119 (2OT)
Scoring by quarter: **32**–19, **28**–18, 24–**33**, 19–**33**, Overtime: 7–7, **13**–9
**Liaoning leads series, 2–1**

Benxi Gymnasium, Benxi, Liaoning

March 22
19:35

Beijing Ducks 72, **Liaoning Flying Leopards 75**
Scoring by quarter: **22**–15, **19**–18, 18–**21**, 13–**21**
**Liaoning win series, 3–1**

Cadillac Arena, Beijing

=== (3) Guangdong Southern Tigers vs. (6) Xinjiang Flying Tigers ===
March 14
20:00

Xinjiang Flying Tigers 114, **Guangdong Southern Tigers** **130**
Scoring by quarter: 34–**43**, 22–**25**, 32–**36**, 26–26
**Guangdong leads series, 1–0**

Hongshan Arena, Ürümqi, Xinjiang

March 17
19:35

**Guangdong Southern Tigers** **123**, Xinjiang Flying Tigers 99
Scoring by quarter: **31**–23, **29**–25, **33**–26, **30**-25
**Guangdong leads series, 2–0**

Nissan Sports Centre, Dongguan, Guangdong

March 19
19:35

Guangdong Southern Tigers 92, **Xinjiang Flying Tigers** **95**
Scoring by quarter: 28–28, **23**–20, **22**–16, 19–**31**
**Guangdong leads series, 2–1**

Nissan Sports Centre, Dongguan, Guangdong

March 22
19:35

Xinjiang Flying Tigers 94, **Guangdong Southern Tigers 118**
Scoring by quarter: 16–**35**, **30**–24, 25–**33**, 23–**26**
**Guangdong win series, 3–1**

Hongshan Arena, Ürümqi, Xinjiang

== Semifinals ==
All times are in China standard time (UTC+8)

=== (1) Zhejiang Lions vs. (4) Shandong Golden Stars ===
March 28
19:35

**Zhejiang Lions** **128**, Shandong Golden Stars 118
Scoring by quarter: **31**–27, **33**–28, **36**–29, 28–**34**
Pts: Lin Chih-chieh 32; Rebs: Hu Jinqiu 8 Asts: Courtney Fortson 13	Pts: Ding Yanyuhang 34; Rebs: Donatas Motiejunas 11; Asts: Ty Lawson 9
**Zhejiang leads series, 1–0**

Hangzhou Gymnasium, Hangzhou, Zhejiang

March 30
19:35

Zhejiang Lions 99, **Shandong Golden Stars** **107**
Scoring by quarter: **30**–26, 14–**25**, 30–**31**, 25–25
Pts: Courtney Fortson 24; Rebs: Hu Jinqiu 11; Asts: Courtney Fortson 6	Pts: Ding Yanyuhang 37; Rebs: Ty Lawson 10; Asts: Ty Lawson 8
**series tied, 1–1**

Hangzhou Gymnasium, Hangzhou, Zhejiang

April 2
19:35

Shandong Golden Stars 90, **Zhejiang Lions** **98**
Scoring by quarter: 20–**26**, 22–**33**, **25**–18, **23**–21
Pts: Ding Yanyuhang 36; Rebs: Donatas Motiejunas 17; Asts: Donatas Motiejunas 5	Pts: Hu Jinqiu 28; Rebs: Hu Jinqiu 15; Asts: Courtney Fortson 11
**Zhejiang leads series, 2–1**

Shandong Arena, Jinan, Shandong

April 4
19:35

**Shandong Golden Stars** **119**, Zhejiang Lions 116
Scoring by quarter: 25–**28**, **40**–30, 24–**27**, 30–**31**
Pts: Ding Yanyuhang 41; Rebs: Donatas Motiejunas 15; Asts: Ty Lawson 7	Pts: Hu Jinqiu 33; Rebs: Hu Jinqiu 12; Asts: Courtney Fortson 13
**series tied, 2–2**

Shandong Arena, Jinan, Shandong

April 6
19:35

**Shandong Golden Stars** **113**, Zhejiang Lions 103
Scoring by quarter: 26–26, **23**–15, **34**–28, 30–**34**
Pts: Ding Yanyuhang 27; Rebs: Donatas Motiejunas 13; Asts: Zhang Chunjun 5	Pts: Ioannis Bourousis 29; Rebs: Ioannis Bourousis 15; Asts: three players; 3
**Shandong leads series, 3–2**

Shandong Arena, Jinan, Shandong

April 9
19:35

**Zhejiang Lions** **117**, Shandong Golden Stars 96
Scoring by quarter: **30**–12, **39**–30, 24–**30**, 24–24
Pts: Courtney Fortson 31; Rebs: Hu Jinqiu 10; Asts: Courtney Fortson 13	Pts: Ty Lawson 26; Rebs: Donatas Motiejunas 11; Asts: Ty Lawson 8
**series tied, 3–3**

Hangzhou Gymnasium, Hangzhou, Zhejiang

April 11
19:35

**Zhejiang Lions** **105**, Shandong Golden Stars 95
Scoring by quarter: 20–**23**, **28**–23, 29–**30**, **28**–19
Pts: Courtney Fortson 26; Rebs: Ioannis Bourousis 16; Asts: Courtney Fortson 6	Pts: Donatas Motiejunas 31; Rebs: Donatas Motiejunas 13; Asts: Ty Lawson 6
**Zhejiang win series, 4–3**

Hangzhou Gymnasium, Hangzhou, Zhejiang

In the third quarter of game 6, Shandong star Ding Yanyuhang went down with a knee injury. He did not return or play in game 7, leading to his team's loss.

=== (2) Liaoning Flying Leopards vs. (3) Guangdong Southern Tigers ===
March 29
19:35

**Liaoning Flying Leopards** **95**, Guangdong Southern Tigers 90
Scoring by quarter: 15–**22**, **29**–28, **21**–20, **30**–20
**Liaoning leads series, 1–0**

Shenyang Gymnasium, Shenyang, Liaoning

March 31
19:35

**Liaoning Flying Leopards** **101**, Guangdong Southern Tigers 95
Scoring by quarter: **19**–15, 20–**29**, **36**–18, 26–**33**
**Liaoning leads series, 2–0**

Shenyang Gymnasium, Shenyang, Liaoning

April 3
19:35

Guangdong Southern Tigers 84, **Liaoning Flying Leopards** **96**
Scoring by quarter: **21**–20, **30**–22, 14–**33**, 19–**21**
**Liaoning leads series, 3–0**

Nissan Sports Centre, Dongguan, Guangdong

April 5
19:35

**Guangdong Southern Tigers** **108**, Liaoning Flying Leopards 102
Scoring by quarter: **24**–9, **29**–15, 33–**34**, 22–**44**
**Liaoning leads series, 3–1**

Nissan Sports Centre, Dongguan, Guangdong

April 7
19:35

Guangdong Southern Tigers 97, **Liaoning Flying Leopards** **111**
Scoring by quarter: 29–**33**, 27–27, **24**–20, 17–**31**
**Liaoning win series, 4–1**

Nissan Sports Centre, Dongguan, Guangdong

== Finals ==
=== (1)Zhejiang Lions vs. (2) Liaoning Flying Leopards ===
April 15
19:35

Zhejiang Lions 108, **Liaoning Flying Leopards** **120**
Scoring by quarter: 21–**32**, **32**–22, 26–**34**, 29–**32**
**Liaoning leads series, 1–0**

Hangzhou Gymnasium, Hangzhou, Zhejiang

April 17
19:35

Zhejiang Lions 116, **Liaoning Flying Leopards** **121** (OT)
Scoring by quarter: **34**–23, 28–**34**, **23**–22, 22–**28**, Overtime: 9–**14**
**Liaoning leads series, 2–0**

Hangzhou Gymnasium, Hangzhou, Zhejiang

April 20
19:35

**Liaoning Flying Leopards** **104**, Zhejiang Lions 100
Scoring by quarter: **33**–16, **30**–27, 24–**31**, 17–**26**
**Liaoning leads series, 3–0**

Shenyang Gymnasium, Shenyang, Liaoning

April 22
19:35

**Liaoning Flying Leopards** **100**, Zhejiang Lions 88
Scoring by quarter: 21–**23**, **29**–25, **27**–21, **23**–19
**Liaoning win series, 4–0**

Shenyang Gymnasium, Shenyang, Liaoning
