= 2015–16 Chinese Basketball Association season =

CBA
- Season: 2015–16
- Duration: October 31, 2015 – February 5, 2016 (regular season） February 15, 2016 – March 6, 2016 (Playoffs); March 11, 2016 – March 25, 2016 (Finals)
- Games played: 38
- Teams: 20

Regular season
- Top seed: Liaoning Flying Leopards

Finals
- Champions: Sichuan Blue Whales (1st title)
- Runners-up: Liaoning Flying Leopards
- Finals MVP: (Iran) Hamed Haddadi

Awards
- Domestic MVP: (China) Yi Jianlian
- International MVP: (United States) Michael Beasley

Statistical leaders
| Points | (United States) Jonathan Gibson | 42.0 |
| Rebounds | (United States) Alan Williams | 15.4 |
| Assists | (United States) Jeremy Pargo | 8.5 |

The 2015–16 CBA season was the 21st season of the Chinese Basketball Association. The regular season began on Saturday, October 31, 2015, with the Beijing Ducks hosting the Xinjiang Flying Tigers. The regular season ended on Friday, February 5, 2016, and the playoffs began on Monday, February 15, 2016.

== Team changes ==
Two teams relocated ahead of the season.

=== Name changes ===
- The Chongqing Soaring Dragons moved to Beijing and initially changed their name to Beijing BG in September 2015. To avoid confusion with the city's soccer club from the second-tier China League One, which is also called Beijing BG or Beijing Beikong, as well as to avoid confusion with the Beijing Ducks when only the geographical names of CBA teams are used—a large number of Chinese sports websites have decided to refer to the team as the Beikong Fly Dragons (the club's official logo has always used the badly-translated English term "Fly Dragons" instead of "Soaring Dragons"). The practice is consistent with the way a lot of Chinese sports websites shorten the second Zhejiang team's name to Guangsha Lions and the second Jiangsu team's name to Tongxi Monkey Kings. So this means Beikong replaces Beijing as the club's "geographical" designation.
- The Dongguan Leopards moved to Shenzhen and changed their name to the Shenzhen Leopards in October 2015.

== Regular season ==
=== Standings ===
| # | 2015–16 CBA season | | | | | |
| # | Team | W | L | PCT | Pts | Tiebreaker |
|---|---|---|---|---|---|---|
| 1 | Liaoning Flying Leopards | 31 | 7 | .816 | 69 | |
| 2 | Xinjiang Flying Tigers | 30 | 8 | .789 | 68 | |
| 3 | Sichuan Blue Whales | 30 | 8 | .789 | 68 | |
| 4 | Guangdong Southern Tigers | 28 | 10 | .737 | 66 | |
| 5 | Shandong Golden Stars | 28 | 10 | .737 | 66 | |
| 6 | Zhejiang Guangsha Lions | 27 | 11 | .711 | 65 | |
| 7 | Beijing Ducks | 23 | 15 | .605 | 61 | |
| 8 | Zhejiang Golden Bulls | 22 | 16 | .579 | 60 | |
| 9 | Shenzhen Leopards | 19 | 19 | .500 | 57 | |
| 10 | Shanxi Brave Dragons | 18 | 20 | .474 | 56 | |
| 11 | Jiangsu Dragons | 18 | 20 | .474 | 56 | |
| 12 | Shanghai Sharks | 18 | 20 | .474 | 56 | |
| 13 | Fujian Sturgeons | 16 | 22 | .421 | 54 | |
| 14 | Qingdao Eagles | 16 | 22 | .421 | 54 | |
| 15 | Beikong Fly Dragons | 13 | 25 | .342 | 51 | |
| 16 | Jiangsu Tongxi Monkey Kings | 12 | 26 | .316 | 50 | |
| 17 | Jilin Northeast Tigers | 10 | 28 | .263 | 48 | |
| 18 | Tianjin Gold Lions | 8 | 30 | .211 | 46 | |
| 19 | Bayi Rockets | 7 | 31 | .184 | 45 | |
| 20 | Foshan Long-Lions | 6 | 32 | .158 | 44 | |

Key to colors
| Top 8 teams advance to the Playoffs |

== Foreign Players Policy ==
All teams except the Bayi Rockets can have two foreign players. The bottom 5 teams from the previous season (except Bayi) have the additional right to sign an extra Asian player.

=== Rules Chart ===
The rules for using foreign players in each game are described in this chart:

| # | Facing other teams | Facing Bayi Rockets |
|---|---|---|
| Chinese players+ | No Limit | No Limit |
| Asian players++ | No Limit | 4 quarters collectively+++ |
| International players | 6 quarters collectively+++ | 4 quarters collectively+++ |

+ Including players from Hong Kong and Taiwan.

++ If a team waives its right to sign an extra Asian player, it may use its 2 foreign players for 7 quarters collectively.

+++ Only 1 allowed in the 4th quarter.

=== Import Chart ===
This is the full list of international players who competed in the CBA during the 2015-16 season.

| Team | Player 1 | Player 2 | Asian Player | Replaced During Season |
| Bayi Rockets | – | – | – | – |
| Beijing Ducks | (United States) Stephon Marbury | (United States) Randolph Morris | – | – |
| Beikong Fly Dragons | (Uruguay) Esteban Batista | (United States) Dorell Wright | (Iran) Mehdi Kamrani | – |
| Foshan Long-Lions | (United States) Jerrelle Benimon | (United States) Jabari Brown | – | (United States) Scotty Hopson |
| Fujian Sturgeons | (United States) Dwight Buycks | (United States) Jeremy Tyler | (Lebanon) Fadi El Khatib | (United States) Jarrid Famous |
| Guangdong Southern Tigers | (United States) Justin Carter | (Nigeria) (United States) Ike Diogu | – | (United States) Will Bynum |
| Jiangsu Dragons | (United States) MarShon Brooks | (United States) Greg Oden | – | (United States) Will McDonald |
| Jiangsu Tongxi Monkey Kings | (Jamaica) Jerome Jordan | (United States) Von Wafer | (Palestine) Sani Sakakini | (Canada) Liam McMorrow |
| Jilin Northeast Tigers | (United States) (Nigeria) Josh Akognon | (Puerto Rico) Peter John Ramos | - | (United States) Marcus Williams |
| Liaoning Flying Leopards | (United States) Lester Hudson | (United States) Shavlik Randolph | – | – |
| Qingdao Eagles | (United States) Jonathan Gibson | (United States) Alan Williams | – | – |
| Shandong Golden Stars | (United States) Michael Beasley | (United States) (Ukraine) Eugene Jeter | – | – |
| Shanghai Sharks | (United States) Bernard James | (United States) A.J. Price | - | - |
| Shanxi Brave Dragons | (United States) Jamaal Franklin | (Haiti) (Canada) Samuel Dalembert | – | (United States) Yancy Gates (United States) Dominique Jones |
| Shenzhen Leopards | (United States) Bobby Brown | (United States) Dominic McGuire | – | – |
| Sichuan Blue Whales | (United States) Justin Dentmon | (United States) Mike Harris | (Iran) Hamed Haddadi | – |
| Tianjin Gold Lions | (United States) Jordan Crawford | (United States) Casper Ware | – | (United States) Jason Maxiell |
| Xinjiang Flying Tigers | (United States) (Philippines) Andray Blatche | (United States) Bryce Cotton | – | (United States) Andrew Goudelock |
| Zhejiang Golden Bulls | (United States) Charles Gaines | (United States) Willie Warren | (Iran) Samad Nikkhah Bahrami | – |
| Zhejiang Guangsha Lions | (United States) Eli Holman | (United States) Jeremy Pargo | – | – |

== Statistical leaders ==
The CBA statistical leaders list combines numbers from both regular season and playoff games.

=== Individual statistical leaders ===
| Category | Player | Team | GP | Total | AVG |
| Points per game | Jordan Crawford | Tianjin Gold Lions | 26 | 1,121 | 43.1 |
| Rebounds per game | Alan Williams | Qingdao Eagles | 35 | 538 | 15.4 |
| Assists per game | Jeremy Pargo | Zhejiang Guangsha Lions | 40 | 335 | 8.5 |
| Steals per game | Hu Xuefeng | Jiangsu Dragons | 34 | 110 | 3.2 |
| Blocks per game | Zhou Qi | Xinjiang Flying Tigers | 42 | 134 | 3.5 |

== Playoffs ==
The 2016 CBA Playoffs began on Monday, February 15, 2016.

=== Bracket ===
This is the bracket for the 2016 CBA Playoffs.

Quarterfinals; Best of 5
1 | Liaoning Flying Leopards | 3
8 | Zhejiang Golden Bulls | 0
4 | Guangdong Southern Tigers | 3
5 | Shandong Golden Stars | 0
2 | Xinjiang Flying Tigers | 3
7 | Beijing Ducks | 1
3 | Sichuan Blue Whales | 3
6 | Zhejiang Guangsha Lions | 0

Semifinals; Best of 5
1 | Liaoning Flying Leopards | 3
4 | Guangdong Southern Tigers | 1
2 | Xinjiang Flying Tigers | 0
3 | Sichuan Blue Whales | 3

Finals; Best of 7
1 | Liaoning Flying Leopards | 1
3 | Sichuan Blue Whales | 4

- Bold Series winner
- Italics Team with home-court advantage

== CBA Awards ==
Playoffs

- CBA Finals MVP:

(Iran) Hamed Haddadi (Sichuan Blue Whales)

Regular Season

- CBA Domestic MVP

(China) Yi Jianlian (Guangdong Southern Tigers)

- CBA International MVP

(United States) Michael Beasley (Shandong Golden Stars)

All-Star Game

- CBA All-Star Game MVP

(United States) Michael Beasley (Shandong Golden Stars)

== Attendances ==
The total CBA attendance in the 2015-16 season was 1.79 billion. The average attendance was 4,710.

| # | Football club | Average attendance |
|---|---|---|
| 1 | Liaoning Flying Leopards | 7,124 |
| 2 | Xinjiang Flying Tigers | 6,874 |
| 3 | Sichuan Blue Whales | 6,624 |
| 4 | Guangdong Southern Tigers | 6,204 |
| 5 | Shandong Golden Stars | 6,014 |
| 6 | Zhejiang Guangsha Lions | 5,754 |
| 7 | Beijing Ducks | 5,514 |
| 8 | Zhejiang Golden Bulls | 5,314 |
| 9 | Shenzhen Leopards | 5,034 |
| 10 | Shanxi Brave Dragons | 4,824 |
| 11 | Jiangsu Dragons | 4,804 |
| 12 | Shanghai Sharks | 4,674 |
| 13 | Fujian Sturgeons | 4,514 |
| 14 | Qingdao Eagles | 4,484 |
| 15 | Beikong Fly Dragons | 4,264 |
| 16 | Jiangsu Monkey Kings | 4,164 |
| 17 | Jilin Northeast Tigers | 4,034 |
| 18 | Tianjin Gold Lions | 3,934 |
| 19 | Bayi Rockets | 3,844 |
| 20 | Foshan Long-Lions | 3,714 |

== See also ==
Chinese Basketball Association
