= Ding Yanyuhang =

Chinese basketball player (born 1993)

Ding Yanyuhang 丁彦雨航
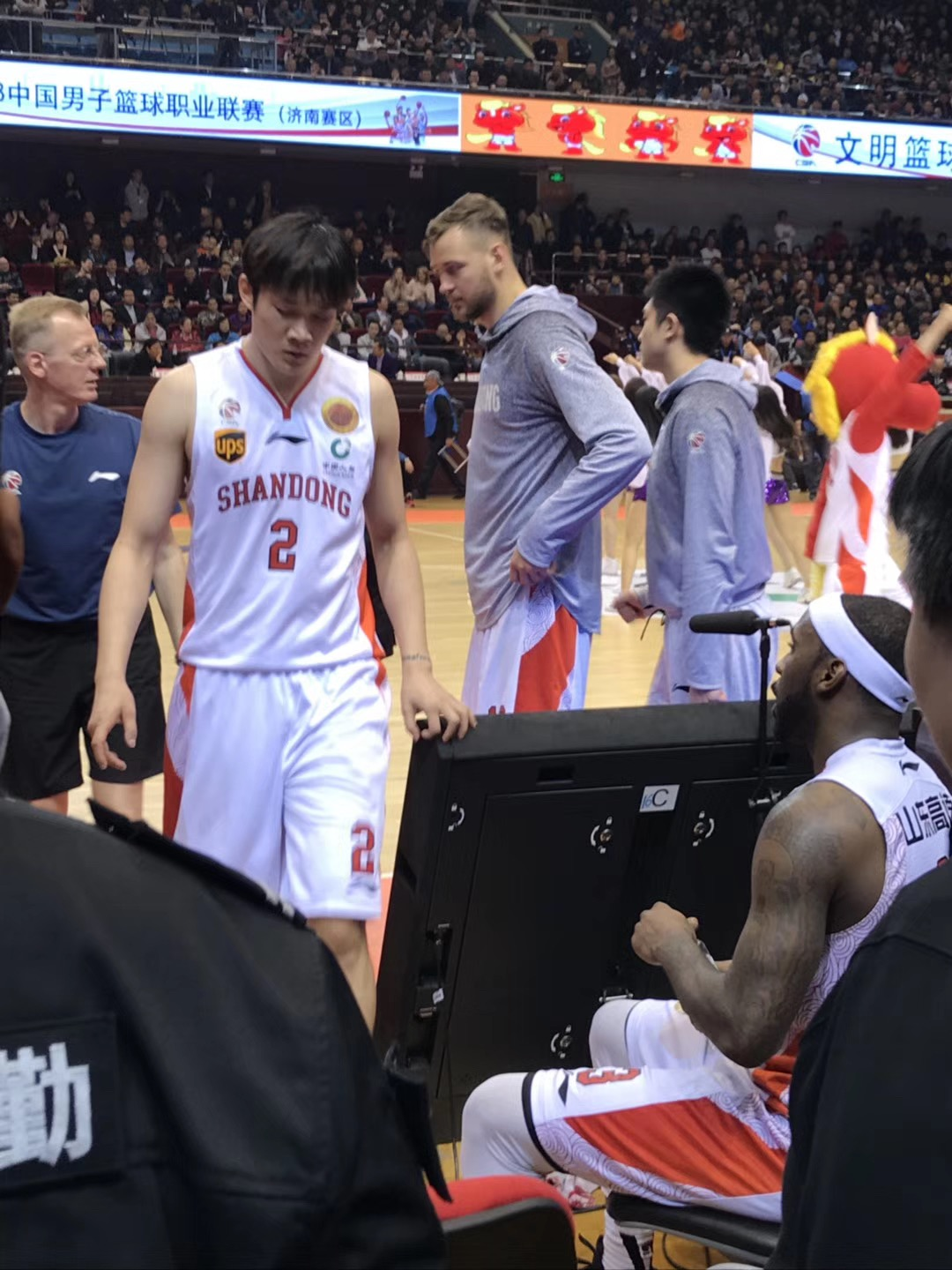
- Ding on the court

Personal information
- Born: August 20, 1993 (age 33) Karamay, Xinjiang, China
- Listed height: 6 ft 7 in (2.01 m)
- Listed weight: 215 lb (98 kg)

Career information
- NBA draft: 2015: undrafted
- Playing career: 2011–2025
- Position: Small forward

Career history
- 2011–2018: Shandong Heroes
- 2021–2022: Shandong Heroes
- 2022–2023: Shanghai Sharks
- 2023–2024: Nanjing Tongxi Monkey Kings
- 2024–2025: Guangzhou Loong Lions

Career highlights
- 2× CBA Domestic MVP (2017, 2018); CBA All-Star Game MVP (2017); 4× CBA All-Star (2013, 2014, 2017, 2018)
- Stats at Basketball Reference
Medals
Men's basketball
Representing China
FIBA Asia Cup
Gold medal – first place	2015 Changsha
Asian Games
Gold medal – first place	2018 Jakarta
East Asian Games
Silver medal – second place	2013 Tianjin
FIBA Under-16 Asia Cup
Gold medal – first place	2009 Johor Bahru

Ding Yanyuhang (simplified Chinese: 丁彦雨航; traditional Chinese: 丁彥雨航; pinyin: Dīng Yànyǔháng [tíŋ jɛ̂n ỳ xǎŋ]; born August 20, 1993) is a Chinese former professional basketball player. He is considered to be one of the greatest Chinese basketball players and scorers of his generation, and was set to join the NBA after a successful showing with the Dallas Mavericks in the 2017 NBA Summer League at the age of 23. However, repeated knee injuries sidelined him from play after stellar CBA seasons in 2016-17 and 2017-18, where he won back-to-back CBA MVPs. This included a magnificent run in the 2018 CBA playoffs, where he scored an average of 29.8 PPG. Through June 2018 to October 2021, Ding was recovering from a string of foot and knee injuries and was out for over 1200 days without professional basketball. Along with Xu Yong, Ding Jinhui, and Wang Lei, Ding Yanyuhang is regarded as one of China's "lost talents" in men's basketball in the 21st century due to injury.

== Early experience ==
Ding Yanyuhang's surname is Ding, "Yan" is taken from his mother "Liu Yan" (first name's homonym), "Yuhang" is because he was born in a rainy day, parents sent to sail the implied meaning. In 1993, he was born in Wulhe town, Karamay city, where the production and construction corps 137 regiment was located. Later, he went to Ürümqi, the capital, with his parents. His father Ding Feng was a professional basketball player of Lanzhou military district basketball team, and his mother was also an athlete. Ding Yanyuhang inherited his parents' sports talent.

Ding Yanyuhang has been following Xinjiang university women's basketball coach Yubin since the first grade to do basic skills training such as dribbling, layup and jumper, laying down solid basic skills for the future. In 2006, Ding's father left Ürümqi to teach at Wang Fei's basketball school in Beijing. Ding Yanyuhang, when he was 13, started to learn from the former defender Li Lin from Bayi Rockets, and began regular basketball training; two years later, Ding Yanyuhang is one of the best players in Wang Fei's basketball school, in the training camp's skills competition, he won "dribble speed", "footsteps skills", "king one-on-one hit" three champions of the project, and in training camp all-star squad. On July 8, 2008, Ding participated the camp held by Li Ning. The school first recommended him to the Bayi youth team, but the Bayi Rockets' youth team did not want him. He joined the Shandong Heroes youth team in 2008, and was selected to the national youth team in 2009. In 2010, he won the scoring champion of the national youth league, and ranked second in the youth league in 2011. On November 3, 2013, Ding Yanyuhang won the title of best student during the 10th anniversary of Wang Fei basketball training camp.

== Professional career ==
=== Asia ===
Touted as one of the CBA's best young stars, Ding scored 18.9 PPG at the young age of 20 in the 2013-14 CBA season, but started to suffer from injuries soon after. In the summer 2015 he suffered from a left knee fracture that limited his minutes in the 2015–16 season. However, once he returned healthy, Ding was named the Chinese Basketball Association (CBA) All-Star Game Most Valuable Player in 2017. He was also named the CBA's regular season Domestic Most Valuable Player in 2017 and 2018. Due to his ongoing injuries and severe degenerative knees, Ding did not play for China in the 2019 FIBA World Cup, and was out until October 2021.

=== NBA ===
In 2017, Ding played with the Dallas Mavericks in the 2017 NBA Summer League in Orlando, Florida and Las Vegas, Nevada. On July 23, 2018, Ding signed a contract with the Mavericks. He was waived on October 10, 2018, due to an ongoing knee injury. The Mavericks originally planned to have him play 8–12 minutes per game. Ding was then added to the roster of the Texas Legends, but was still inactive due to injury.

=== Return to China ===
On October 16, 2021, Ding returned to Shandong for the first time in more than 3 years, and scored 19 points against the Beijing Royal Fighters in 24 minutes of play. He later scored 9 3-pointers and 34 points in a 102–90 win against the Nanjing Monkey Kings on October 24. However, he only played 20 games for Shandong in the 2021-22 season, before leaving the team in the summer.

Ding signed with the Shanghai Sharks for the 2022-23 season, where he scored a season-high 18 points against Tianjin on October 19, 2022. However, just two days later, he reinjured his knee and was out for most of the season.

In the summer of 2024, Ding signed with the Nanjing Monkey Kings, but only appeared in 7 games and was used sparingly off the bench. He signed with Guangzhou for the 2024-25 season but has not appeared a game.

In 2025, Ding was retired from professional basketball and became the co-founder of new NBL club "Guizhou Menglong".

== CBA career statistics ==
Legend
GP	Games played	FPG	Foul per game	MPG	Minutes per game
FG%	Field goal percentage	3P%	3-point field goal percentage	FT%	Free throw percentage
RPG	Rebounds per game	APG	Assists per game	SPG	Steals per game
BPG	Blocks per game	PPG	Points per game	TO	Turnovers per game

Season	Team	GP	MPG	FG%	3P%	FT%	RPG (Offence/Defence)	BPG	APG	SPG	FPG	TO	PPG
11-12	Shandong	31	19.2	44.2	30.9	70.3	2.0 (0.8/1.2)	0.3	1.9	0.5	1.8	1.4	7.1
12-13	Shandong	42	27.2	47.1	37.8	71.3	4.7 (1/3.7)	0.1	1.2	0.8	2.6	1.9	14.2
13-14	Shandong	29	33.2	46.4	33.5	75.4	4.4 (1/3.4)	0.5	2.6	1.3	2.8	1.6	18.9
14-15	Shandong	31	30.8	44.3	29.7	78.8	5.6 (1.3/4.3)	0.3	1.7	0.7	2.0	1.5	15.6
15-16	Shandong	26	24.4	40.6	25.8	81.9	3.5 (1.1/2.4)	0.3	1.6	1.2	1.8	1	12.7
16-17	Shandong	39	38.0	45.2	32.8	78.8	5.7 (1.8/3.9)	0.5	3.0	1.5	2.6	3	26.0
17-18	Shandong	45	37.2	46.3	34.7	77.4	5.3 (1.1/4.2)	0.8	3.2	1.6	2.5	2.4	28.2
21-22	Shandong	20	23.6	41.3	35.6	75.4	2.9 (0.5/2.4)	0.1	1.4	0.6	1.6	1.9	13.0
22-23	Shanghai	14	16.1	36.0	27.9	83.3	2.4 (0.9/1.5)	0.1	1.0	0.8	1.6	0.9	5.4
23-24	Nanjing	7	12.9	36.8	20.0	50.0	2.0 (0.7/1.3)	0.0	0.9	0.3	1.4	0.6	2.6

== National team career ==
On June 25, 2013, Ding Yanyuhang finally made his debut in the Chinese men's basketball team. Facing Ukraine in an exhibition, Ding scored 7 points in the first half to lead the team to a 112–88 victory. However, he was ultimately excluded from the 12-man list of the Asian basketball championships.

On February 26, 2014, the Chinese basketball association has announced the 2014 first batch of men's basketball training list. Four basketball players from Shandong Heroes, Ding Yanyuhang, Sui Ran, Li Jingyu, Tao Hanlin, were in the list.

In the 2014 Incheon Asian games, Ding Yanyuhang scored 10 or more points in four of the five games. However, China lost to Iran in a stunning upset during the quarterfinals and did not medal in men's basketball for the first time ever at the Asian Games.

On August 6, 2018, Ding Yanyuhang was selected to the list of Chinese sports delegation for the 18th Asian games. Despite playing with clear knee injuries, Ding helped Chinese men's basketball team win the Asian games title for the eighth time with an 84–72 victory over Iran in the 2018 Asian games final in Jakarta on Sept. 1, 2018.

Ding represented the Chinese national basketball team at the 2015 FIBA Asia Championship in Changsha, China, where he won a gold medal. He also played at the 2016 Summer Olympics.

Due to his ongoing injuries and severe degenerative knees, Ding did not play for China in the 2019 FIBA World Cup, and has not been called up to the national team sense. Given his injury history, it is unlikely that he will ever play for the Chinese national team ever again.

== Awards ==
=== Personal honor ===
▪ Ranked fourth in 2017 Chinese athletes' communication influence list (award)

▪ 2017-2018 CBA most valuable domestic player in regular season (award)

▪ 2016-2017 CBA most valuable domestic player in regular season (award)

▪ 2013-2014 CBA All-Star race (award)

▪ 2012-2013 CBA All-Star race (awards)

▪ 2010 National junior league scoring champion (award)

=== Team honors ===
▪ 2018 15th Asian games men's basketball gold medal (award)

▪ 2012-13 CBA runner-up (award)
