= CBA Most Valuable Player =

List of Most Valuable Players in the Chinese Basketball Association

Chinese Basketball Association (CBA) Most Valuable Player (MVP) is the annual award that is handed out at the end of each Chinese Basketball Association (CBA) regular season to the league's most valuable player. From the league's inaugural 1995–96 season until the 2011–12 season, only Chinese/Taiwanese players were eligible to win the award. Since the 2012–13 season, separate awards for both domestic and international players have been handed out. Domestic players are eligible to win the CBA Domestic Most Valuable Player award, while international players are eligible to win the CBA International Most Valuable Player award.

== Award winners ==
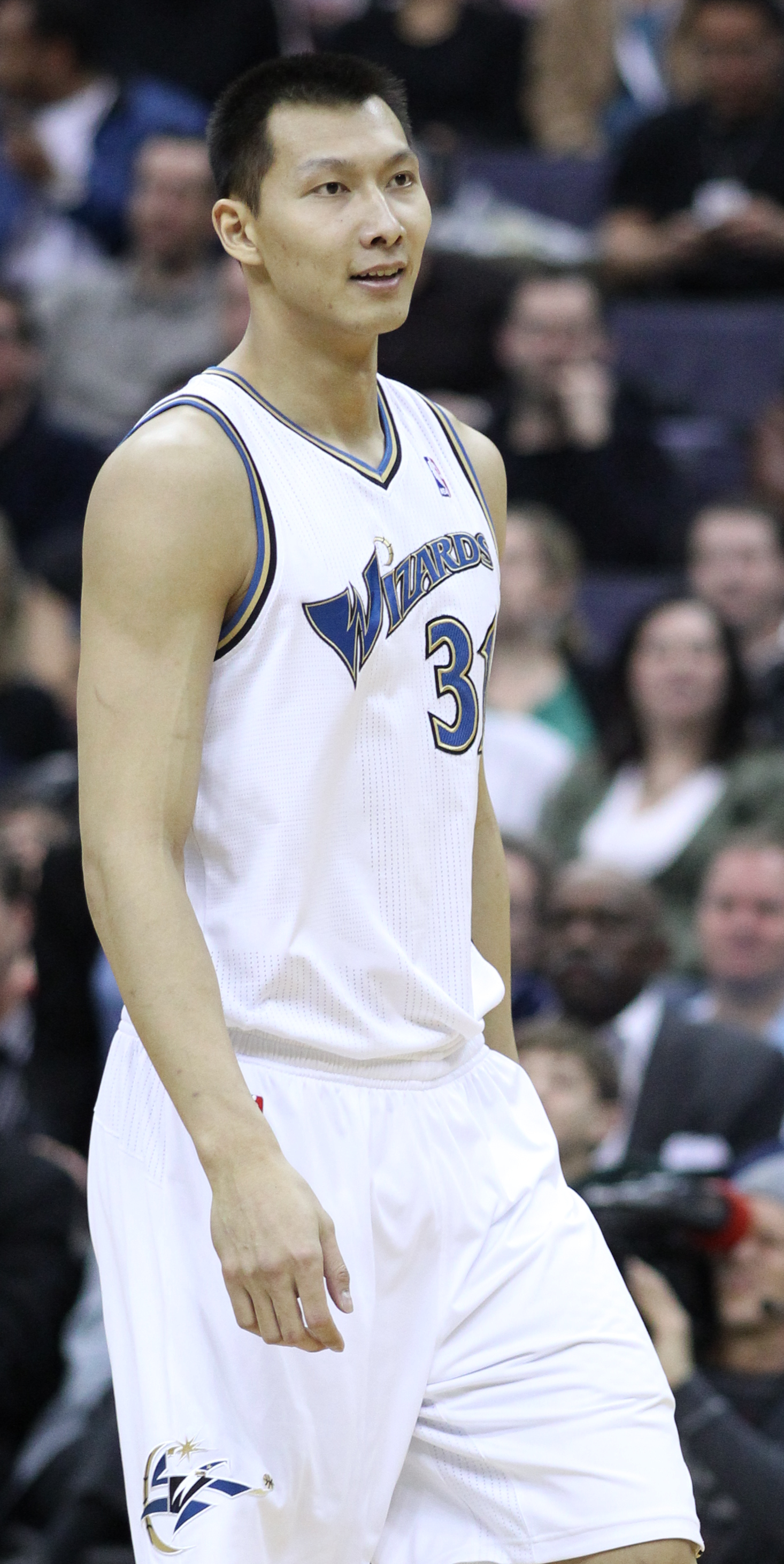
Yi Jianlian, shown here during his NBA days, is a five-time CBA MVP award winner.

Just one Most Valuable Player award was given out at the conclusion of each of the first 17 Chinese Basketball Association seasons. To reflect the league's growing internationalization, however, the honor was split into domestic and International awards as of the 2012–13 season.

Key
‡	Denotes the team won the CBA title in the same season the individual was selected as MVP

CBA Domestic MVP award winners
Season	Player	Nationality	Position	Team	Ref(s)
CBA Regular Season MVP Award (1995–96 to 2011–12)
1995–96	Hu Weidong	China	PG/SG	Jiangsu Dragons	
1996–97	Hu Weidong (×2)	China	PG/SG	Jiangsu Dragons	
1997–98	Gong Xiaobin	China	F/C	Shandong Flaming Bulls	
1998–99	Sun Jun	China	SF	Jilin Northeast Tigers	
1999–00	Wang Zhizhi	China	F/C	Bayi Rockets ^{‡}	
2000–01	Yao Ming	China	C	Shanghai Sharks	
2001–02	Liu Yudong	China	PF	Bayi Rockets	
2002–03	Sun Jun (×2)	China	SF	Jilin Northeast Tigers	
2003–04	Tang Zhengdong	China	C	Jiangsu Dragons	
2004–05	Tang Zhengdong (×2)	China	C	Jiangsu Dragons	
2005–06 ^{1}	~~Mengke Bateer~~ STRIPPED	China	C	Beijing Ducks	
2006–07	Tang Zhengdong (×3)	China	C	Jiangsu Dragons	
2007–08	Zhu Fangyu	China	SF	Guangdong Southern Tigers ^{‡}	
2008–09	Mengke Bateer	China	C	Xinjiang Flying Tigers	
2009–10	Mengke Bateer (×2)	China	C	Xinjiang Flying Tigers	
2010–11	Mengke Bateer (×3)	China	C	Xinjiang Flying Tigers	
2011–12	Zhu Fangyu (×2)	China	SF	Guangdong Southern Tigers	
CBA Regular Season Domestic MVP Award (2012–13 to Present)
2012–13	Yi Jianlian	China	F/C	Guangdong Southern Tigers ^{‡}	
2013–14	Yi Jianlian (×2)	China	F/C	Guangdong Southern Tigers	
2014–15	Yi Jianlian (×3)	China	F/C	Guangdong Southern Tigers	
2015–16	Yi Jianlian (×4)	China	F/C	Guangdong Southern Tigers	
2016–17	Ding Yanyuhang	China	SG/SF	Shandong Golden Stars	
2017–18	Ding Yanyuhang (×2)	China	SG/SF	Shandong Golden Stars	
2018–19	Wang Zhelin	China	C	Fujian Sturgeons	
2019–20	Yi Jianlian (×5)	China	F/C	Guangdong Southern Tigers ^{‡}	
2020–21	Wu Qian	China	SG	Zhejiang Golden Bulls	
2021–22	Hu Jinqiu	China	F/C	Zhejiang Guangsha Lions	
2022–23	Wang Zhelin	China	C	Shanghai Sharks	
2023–24	Abdusalam Abdurixit	China	SF	Xinjiang Flying Tigers	
2024–25	Hu Jinqiu	China	C	Zhejiang Lions	
2025–26	He Xining	China	SF/SG	Shenzhen Leopards	

Notes
^1 Mengke Bateer of the Beijing Ducks was originally chosen as the 2005–06 CBA Regular Season MVP, but he was later stripped of the honor as a disciplinary punishment for arguing with a referee, which led to a suspension.

CBA International MVP award winners
Season	Player	Nationality	Position	Team	Ref(s)
CBA Regular Season International MVP Award (2012–13 to Present)
2012–13	Stephon Marbury	United States	PG	Beijing Ducks	
2013–14	Lester Hudson	United States	PG/SG	Xinjiang Flying Tigers	
2014–15	Lester Hudson (×2)	United States	PG/SG	Liaoning Flying Leopards	
2015–16	Michael Beasley	United States	SF/PF	Shandong Golden Stars	
2016–17	Jimmer Fredette	United States	PG/SG	Shanghai Sharks	
2017–18	Courtney Fortson	United States	PG	Zhejiang Guangsha Lions	
2018–19	Darius Adams	United States; Bulgaria	PG	Xinjiang Flying Tigers	
2019–20	Joe Young	United States	PG/SG	Nanjing Monkey Kings	
2020–21	MarShon Brooks	United States	SG	Guangdong Southern Tigers	
2021–22	Kay Felder	United States	PG	Shanxi Loongs	
2022–23	Dominique Jones	United States	PG/SG	Jilin Northeast Tigers	
2023–24	Jared Sullinger	United States	PF	Shenzhen Leopards	
2024–25	Kenneth Lofton Jr.	United States	PF/C	Shanghai Sharks	
2025–26	Terquavion Smith	United States	PG	Shenzhen Leopards	

== Players with most awards ==
Player	Awards	Years
(China) Yi Jianlian	5	2013-2016, 2020
(Mongolia) (China) Mengke Bateer	4*	2009-2011 and 2006 (stripped)
(China) Ding Yanyuhang	2	2017, 2018
(China) Tang Zhengdong	2	2004, 2005
(China) Hu Weidong	2	1996, 1997
(United States) Lester Hudson	2	2014, 2015

== See also ==
- CBA Finals MVP
- CBA Scoring Champion
