= 2014–15 Chinese Basketball Association season =

CBA
- Season: 2014–15
- Duration: November 1, 2014 – February 1, 2015 (regular season） February 6, 2015 – March 6, 2015 (Playoffs); March 10, 2015 – March 22, 2015 (Finals)
- Games played: 38 (Regular season)
- Teams: 20

Regular season
- Top seed: Guangdong Southern Tigers

Finals
- Champions: Beijing Ducks (3rd title)
- Runners-up: Liaoning Flying Leopards
- Semifinalists: Guangdong Southern Tigers; Qingdao Eagles
- Finals MVP: (United States) Stephon Marbury

Awards
- Domestic MVP: (China) Yi Jianlian
- International MVP: (United States) Lester Hudson

Statistical leaders
| Points | (United States) Errick McCollum | 39.6 |
| Rebounds | (United States) Charles Gaines | 16.4 |
| Assists | (United States) Dominique Jones | 8.3 |

The 2014–15 CBA season was the 20th Chinese Basketball Association (CBA) season. The Jiangsu Tongxi Monkey Kings and Chongqing Fly Dragons were "promoted" to the CBA, becoming the league's 19th and 20th teams. Two clubs also altered or changed their mascots, with the Foshan Dralions opting to be called the Foshan Long-Lions in English, while the Shandong Gold Lions became the Shandong Golden Stars.

The regular season began on Saturday, November 1, 2014, with the Beijing Ducks hosting the Guangdong Southern Tigers. The 2015 CBA All-Star Game was played on January 18, 2015, at the Beijing National Indoor Stadium in Beijing. The regular season ended on Sunday, February 1, 2015, and the playoffs began on Friday, February 6, 2015.

== Foreign players policy ==
All teams except the Bayi Rockets can have two foreign players while the bottom four teams from the previous season, as well as the Jiangsu Tongxi Monkey Kings and Chongqing Fly Dragons, have an additional right to sign an extra Asian player.

The rule of using players in each game is described in this chart:

| # | Facing other teams | Facing Bayi Rockets |
|---|---|---|
| Chinese players+ | No Limit | No Limit |
| Asian players++ | No Limit | 5 quarters collectively+++ |
| International players | 6 quarters collectively+++ | 5 quarters collectively+++ |

+ Including players from Hong Kong and Chinese Taipei.

++ If teams waive their rights to sign the extra Asian player, they may use foreign players for 7 quarters collectively.

+++ Only 1 allowed in the 4th quarter.

=== Foreign players ===
| Club | Player 1 | Player 2 | Asian Player |
|---|---|---|---|
| Bayi Rockets | - | - | - |
| Beijing Ducks | (United States) Stephon Marbury | (United States) Randolph Morris | - |
| Chongqing Fly Dragons | (United States) Willie Warren | (United States) J'mison Morgan | (Iran) Arsalan Kazemi |
| Dongguan Leopards | (United States) Bobby Brown | (Nigeria) (United States) Ike Diogu | - |
| Foshan Long-Lions | (United States) (Nigeria) Josh Akognon | (Ukraine) Viacheslav Kravtsov | (Lebanon) Fadi El Khatib |
| Fujian Sturgeons | (United States) John Lucas III | (United States) D. J. White | - |
| Guangdong Southern Tigers | (United States) Will Bynum | (Democratic Republic of the Congo) Emmanuel Mudiay | - |
| Jiangsu Dragons | (United States) Toney Douglas | (United States) Arnett Moultrie | - |
| Jiangsu Tongxi Monkey Kings | (United States) Brandon Costner | (United States) Will McDonald | (Iran) Mehdi Kamrani |
| Jilin Northeast Tigers | (United States) Dominique Jones | (United States) Denzel Bowles | (Syria) Michel Madanly |
| Liaoning Flying Leopards | (United States) Lester Hudson | (United States) Deon Thompson | - |
| Qingdao Eagles | (United States) Justin Dentmon | (United States) Mike Harris | (Iran) Hamed Haddadi |
| Shandong Golden Stars | (United States) (Ukraine) Eugene Jeter | (United States) Earl Clark | - |
| Shanghai Sharks | (United States) Michael Beasley | (United States) Bernard James | - |
| Shanxi Brave Dragons | (United States) Von Wafer | (United States) Jeremy Tyler | (Jordan) Zaid Abbas |
| Sichuan Blue Whales | (Nigeria) (United States) Michael Efevberha | (United States) Daniel Orton | - |
| Tianjin Gold Lions | (United States) Dwight Buycks | (United States) Shelden Williams | - |
| Xinjiang Flying Tigers | (United States) Sebastian Telfair | (United States) (Philippines) Andray Blatche | - |
| Zhejiang Golden Bulls | (United States) Errick McCollum | (United States) Charles Gaines | - |
| Zhejiang Guangsha Lions | (United States) Kevin Murphy | (United States) Eli Holman | - |

== Regular season ==
The regular season began on Saturday, November 1, 2014, with the Beijing Ducks hosting the Guangdong Southern Tigers. The regular season ended on February 1, 2015.

=== Standings ===
| # | 2014–15 CBA season | | | | | |
| # | Team | W | L | PCT | Pts | Tiebreaker |
|---|---|---|---|---|---|---|
| 1 | Guangdong Southern Tigers | 34 | 4 | .895 | 72 | |
| 2 | Liaoning Flying Leopards | 33 | 5 | .868 | 71 | |
| 3 | Qingdao Eagles | 28 | 10 | .737 | 66 | |
| 4 | Beijing Ducks | 27 | 11 | .711 | 65 | BJ 4–2; JL 3-3; SX 3-3 (JL 253-214 SX); ZJ 2–4 |
| 5 | Jilin Northeast Tigers | 27 | 11 | .711 | 65 | BJ 4–2; JL 3-3; SX 3-3 (JL 253-214 SX); ZJ 2–4 |
| 6 | Shanxi Brave Dragons | 27 | 11 | .711 | 65 | BJ 4–2; JL 3-3; SX 3-3 (JL 253-214 SX); ZJ 2–4 |
| 7 | Zhejiang Guangsha Lions | 27 | 11 | .711 | 65 | BJ 4–2; JL 3-3; SX 3-3 (JL 253-214 SX); ZJ 2–4 |
| 8 | Dongguan Leopards | 25 | 13 | .658 | 63 | DG 2-0 XJ |
| 9 | Xinjiang Flying Tigers | 25 | 13 | .658 | 63 | DG 2-0 XJ |
| 10 | Foshan Long-Lions | 18 | 20 | .474 | 56 | FS 2-0 SD |
| 11 | Shandong Golden Stars | 18 | 20 | .474 | 56 | FS 2-0 SD |
| 12 | Shanghai Sharks | 17 | 21 | .447 | 55 | |
| 13 | Tianjin Gold Lions | 13 | 25 | .342 | 51 | |
| 14 | Jiangsu Dragons | 11 | 27 | .289 | 49 | JS 1-1(222–221) ZJ |
| 15 | Zhejiang Golden Bulls | 11 | 27 | .289 | 49 | JS 1-1(222–221) ZJ |
| 16 | Fujian Sturgeons | 10 | 28 | .263 | 48 | FJ 1-1(249–247) JS |
| 17 | Jiangsu Tongxi Monkey Kings | 10 | 28 | .263 | 48 | FJ 1-1(249–247) JS |
| 18 | Sichuan Blue Whales | 8 | 30 | .211 | 46 | |
| 19 | Bayi Rockets | 7 | 31 | .184 | 45 | |
| 20 | Chongqing Fly Dragons | 4 | 34 | .105 | 42 | |

Key to colors
| Top 8 teams advance to the Playoffs |

== Playoffs ==
The 2015 CBA Playoffs began on Friday, February 6, 2015. The season champion is Beijing Ducks who succeeded in defending their title.

=== Bracket ===
Quarterfinals; Best of 5
1 | Guangdong Southern Tigers | 3
8 | Dongguan Leopards | 1
4 | Beijing Ducks | 3
5 | Jilin Northeast Tigers | 0
2 | Liaoning Flying Leopards | 3
7 | Zhejiang Lions | 0
3 | Qingdao Eagles | 3
6 | Shanxi Brave Dragons | 0

Semifinals; Best of 5
1 | Guangdong Southern Tigers | 1
4 | Beijing Ducks | 3
2 | Liaoning Flying Leopards | 3
3 | Qingdao Eagles | 0

Finals; Best of 7
4 | Beijing Ducks | 4
2 | Liaoning Flying Leopards | 2

- Bold Series winner
- Italics Team with home-court advantage

== Statistics leaders ==
=== Individual statistic leaders ===
| Category | Player | Team | Statistics |
|---|---|---|---|
| Points per game | Errick McCollum | Zhejiang Golden Bulls | 39.6 |
| Rebounds per game | Charles Gaines | Zhejiang Golden Bulls | 16.4 |
| Assists per game | Dominique Jones | Jilin Northeast Tigers | 8.3 |
| Steals per game | Lester Hudson | Liaoning Flying Leopards | 3.32 |
| Blocks per game | Zhou Qi | Xinjiang Flying Tigers | 3.4 |
| Turnovers per game | Michael Beasley | Shanghai Sharks | 4.76 |
| Triple-doubles | Lester Hudson | Liaoning Flying Leopards | 5 |

=== Team statistic leaders ===
| Category | Team | Statistics |
|---|---|---|
| Points per game | Guangdong Southern Tigers | 116.6 |
| Rebounds per game | Shanghai Sharks | 47.6 |
| Assists per game | Liaoning Flying Leopards | 21.3 |
| Steals per game | Jiangsu Dragons | 11.3 |
| Blocks per game | Shanghai Sharks | 4.8 |
| Turnovers per game | Shanghai Sharks | 18.5 |
| Fouls per game | Zhejiang Golden Bulls | 28.7 |
| FG% | Guangdong Southern Tigers | 53.3% |
| FT% | Foshan Long-Lions | 79.9% |
| 3FG% | Guangdong Southern Tigers | 40.8% |

== Awards ==
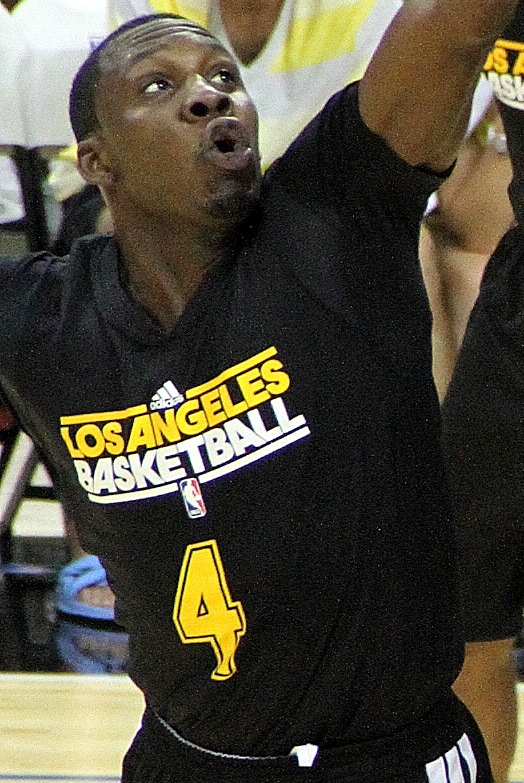
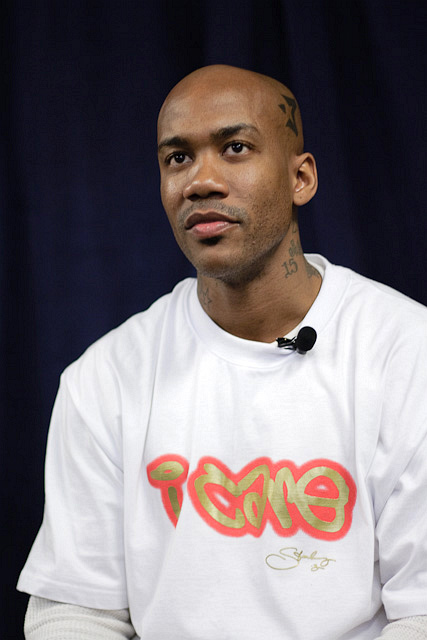
Lester Hudson won the CBA Foreign MVP award, Stephon Marbury was named CBA Finals MVP

| Award | Player | Team | Ref |
|---|---|---|---|
| Domestic Most Valuable Player | (China) Yi Jianlian | Guangdong Southern Tigers | |
| Foreign Most Valuable Player | (United States) Lester Hudson | Liaoning Flying Leopards | |
| Finals MVP | (United States) Stephon Marbury | Beijing Ducks | |
