= Courtney Fortson =

American basketball player (born 1988)

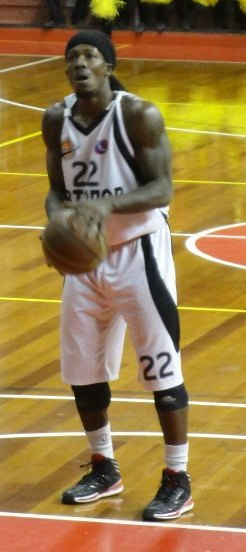
- Fortson with Avtodor Saratov in 2013

Personal information
- Born: May 23, 1988 (age 38) Montgomery, Alabama, U.S.
- Listed height: 5 ft 10 in (1.78 m)
- Listed weight: 188 lb (85 kg)

Career information
- High school: Jefferson Davis (Montgomery, Alabama); The Patterson School (Lenoir, North Carolina)
- College: Arkansas (2008–2010)
- NBA draft: 2010: undrafted
- Playing career: 2010–2024
- Position: Point guard

Career history
- 2010–2011: Steaua Turabo Bucuresti
- 2011: Reno Bighorns
- 2011–2012: Los Angeles D-Fenders
- 2012: Los Angeles Clippers
- 2012: Houston Rockets
- 2012: →Rio Grande Valley Vipers
- 2012–2013: Los Angeles D-Fenders
- 2013–2014: Trotamundos
- 2013: Caneros de La Romana
- 2013–2015: Avtodor Saratov
- 2015–2016: Banvit
- 2016–2019: Zhejiang Lions
- 2019–2020: Sichuan Blue Whales
- 2022–2023: Spójnia Stargard
- 2023: Kauhajoki Karhu
- 2024: Denain Voltaire
- 2024: Changsha Wantian Yongsheng

Career highlights
- All-VTB United League First Team (2015); CBA Foreign MVP (2018); CBA Best Defender (2018); CBA Steals leader (2018); Turkish League All-Star (2016); Russian Superleague MVP (2014); Russian Superleague First Team (2014); NBA D-League All-Star (2013); All-NBA D-League Second Team (2012); Second-team All-SEC (2010); Alabama Mr. Basketball (2007)
- Stats at NBA.com
- Stats at Basketball Reference

Courtney Grant Fortson (born May 23, 1988) is an American former professional basketball player. He played college basketball for the Arkansas Razorbacks.

== High school ==
Fortson attended Jefferson Davis High School in Montgomery, Alabama, where he was named Mr. Basketball by the Alabama Sports Writers Association in 2007.

== College career ==
He played his college basketball at the University of Arkansas as a guard, and recorded the school's second-ever triple double (20 points, 12 assists and 10 rebounds) in a December 2008 win over North Carolina Central University.

== Professional career ==
After going undrafted in the 2010 NBA draft, Fortson signed with Steaua Turabo Bucuresti of Romania but later left in January 2011. In March 2011, he joined the Reno Bighorns of the NBA D-League.

In November 2011, Fortson was acquired by the Los Angeles D-Fenders. But on December 8, 2011, he was signed by the Los Angeles Clippers. However, he was later waived before the start of the 2011–12 season and re-joined the D-Fenders. Not long after being waived by the Clippers, he was called up on January 16, 2012, on a ten-day contract. However, he was waived by the team on January 27, 2012, after playing four games. Fortson signed a ten-day contract with the Houston Rockets later that season, and was eventually signed by the Rockets for the remainder of the season. In September 2012, he was waived by the Rockets. Fortson, again, signed with the Los Angeles Clippers for training camp on September 29, 2012, but on October 7, 2012, he and Chris Johnson were waived by the Clippers. Later that month, he joined the Los Angeles D-Fenders. On February 4, 2013, Fortson was named to the Futures All-Star roster for the 2013 NBA D-League All-Star Game.

In September 2013, he signed with Avtodor Saratov of Russia for the 2013–14 season. On June 3, 2014, he signed with Trotamundos de Carabobo for the rest of the 2014 LPB season. On July 5, 2014, he returned to Avtodor Saratov, signing for one more season. On February 18, 2015, Fortson scored a triple double in a EuroChallenge-game against Güssing Knights; he recorded 30 points, 12 rebounds and 13 assists and was named Weekly MVP.

On July 11, 2015, Fortson signed with the Turkish club Banvit. On March 9, 2016, he parted ways with Banvit after averaging 16.2 points, 4.3 rebounds and 6.5 assists per game in BSL.

In July 2016, Forston signed with Chinese club Zhejiang Lions for the 2016–17 CBA season.

On January 4, 2017, Fortson recorded a triple-double after posting 22 points, 11 rebounds and a career-high 20 assists in a 117–130 loss to the Shandong Golden Stars.

Fortson was named the CBA MVP for the 2017–18 season, after he averaged 31.1 points, 12 assists and 7.8 rebounds per game while leading Zhejiang to the first seed in the CBA.

On July 26, 2021, Fortson signed with Bnei Herzliya of the Israeli Basketball Premier League.

On October 26, 2022, Fortson signed with Spójnia Stargard of the Polish Basketball League (PLK).

On October 5, 2023, Fortson signed with Kauhajoki Karhu of the Korisliiga. On December 26, 2023, he left Kauhajoki Karhu.

On February 21, 2024, Fortson joined Denain Voltaire Basket of the LNB Pro B.

On May 23, 2024, Fortson joined Changsha Wantian Yongsheng of the National Basketball League.

On December 26, 2024, Fortson signed with the Homenetmen Beirut of the Lebanese Basketball League.

== Career statistics ==
Legend
GP	Games played	MPG	Minutes per game	FG%	Field goal percentage
3P%	3-point field goal percentage	FT%	Free throw percentage	RPG	Rebounds per game
APG	Assists per game	SPG	Steals per game	BPG	Blocks per game
PPG	Points per game	**Bold**	Career high		Led the league

Year	Team	League	GP	MPG	FG%	3P%	FT%	RPG	APG	SPG	BPG	PPG
2010–11	CSA Steaua Bucuresti	Liga Nationala	5	23.0	.378	.333	**.875**	3.6	3.2	.6	.0	9.2
2011–12	LA Clippers/Houston Rockets	NBA	10	9.5	.344	.231	.667	1.5	1.0	.3	.0	3.5
2011–12	LA D-Fenders/Rio Grande	NBA D-League	31	34.6	**.471**	.396	.796	4.5	6.2	2.1	.1	17.2
2012–13	Los Angeles D-Fenders	NBA D-League	46	38.4	.398	.355	.766	5.0	7.1	2.0	.1	17.8
2014–15	BC Avtodor Saratov	FIBA Europe Cup	13	38.2	.444	**.460**	.735	6.0	9.8	1.9	**.2**	17.2
2015–16	Bandırma B.İ.K.	Turkish League	20	34.6	.394	.384	.852	4.4	6.5	1.2	.1	16.3
2016–17	Zhejiang Lions	CBA	42	40.1	.421	.335	.844	7.4	8.5	**2.6**	.1	29.0
2017–18	Zhejiang Lions	CBA	**50**	**40.2**	.458	.331	.817	**7.6**	**11.0**	**2.6**	**.2**	**30.7**
2018–19	Zhejiang Lions	CBA	48	**40.2**	.411	.286	.711	7.5	**11.0**	2.4	**.2**	23.9
2019–20	Sichuan Blue Whales	CBA	30	35.8	.454	.330	.770	6.3	7.3	1.5	.0	27.4
Career		All Leagues	295	37.1	.430	.336	.786	6.1	8.3	2.1	.1	22.7
