= Shenzhen Dayun Arena =

Sports venue in Shenzhen, China

Coordinates: 22.700821°N 114.212194°E

Shenzhen Dayun Arena 深圳大运中心体育馆
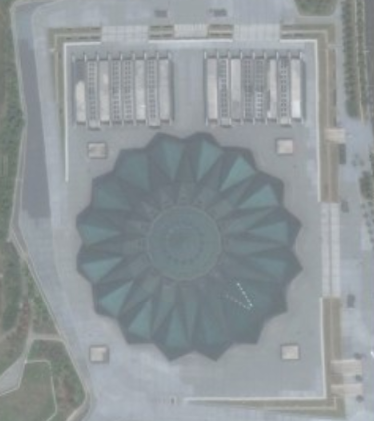
- Interactive map of Shenzhen Dayun Arena 深圳大运中心体育馆
- Location: Shenzhen Universiade Sports Centre; Longgang, Shenzhen, Guangdong, China
- Owner: Shenzhen Municipal Government
- Operator: China Resources
- Capacity: 18,000
- Public transit: Universiade; 3 14 16

Construction
- Opened: August 2011
- Architect: GMP Architects

Tenants
- Shenzhen KRS (WCIHL); Shenzhen Leopards (CBA); Former tenants; Shenzhen Naja (CAFL) (2016); Vanke Rays (CWHL) (2017–2018)

Chinese name
- Simplified Chinese: 深圳大运中心体育馆
- Traditional Chinese: 深圳大運中心體育館
- Literal meaning: Shenzhen Universiade Center Gymnasium
Transcriptions
Standard Mandarin
- Hanyu Pinyin: Shēnzhèn Dàyùn Zhōngxīn Tǐyùguǎn
- Wade–Giles: Shenchen Tayün Chunghsin T'iyükuan
Yue: Cantonese
- Yale Romanization: Sāmjan Daaihwahn Jūngsām Táiyuhkgún

The Shenzhen Dayun Arena or Shenzhen Universiade Centre Gymnasium (Chinese: 深圳大运中心体育馆) is a basketball and ice hockey arena in the Longgang District of Shenzhen, Guangdong, China. It is one of the three sports venues that comprise Shenzhen Universiade Sports Centre, along with Longgang Stadium and the Universiade Centre Aquatic Centre.

It is the home of both Shenzhen KRS of the Chinese Women's Ice Hockey League (WCIHL) and the Shenzhen Leopards of the Chinese Basketball Association (CBA). It hosted the Division B games of the 2025 FIBA Women's Asia Cup.

In addition to basketball and ice hockey, Shenzhen Dayun Arena is used for badminton, gymnastics, and table tennis events.

== History ==
The 18,000 seat arena was designed by the German architecture firm Gerkan, Marg and Partners (GMP) and constructed for the 2011 Summer Universiade, which was hosted by Shenzhen. It opened in August 2011 and was used as the main venue for basketball at the 2011 Summer Universiade, hosting games for both the men's tournament and women's tournament.Due the FISU rules the arena was during the Games referred to as the "Main Gymnasium of Universiade Center" (Chinese: 大运中心主体育馆; pinyin: Dàyùn Zhōngxīn Zhǔ Tǐyùguǎn).

== Events ==
- 13–22 August 2011: Basketball at the 2011 Summer Universiade
- 11 October 2015: NBA Global Games, Charlotte Hornets versus Los Angeles Clippers
- 15 September 2018: NHL Global Series, Boston Bruins versus Calgary Flames
- 20–26 August 2023: 2023 IIHF Women's World Championship Division I Group A

== See also ==
- List of indoor arenas in China
