= Hangzhou Gymnasium =

Sports venue in Hangzhou, China

Hangzhou Gymnasium 杭州广厦体育馆
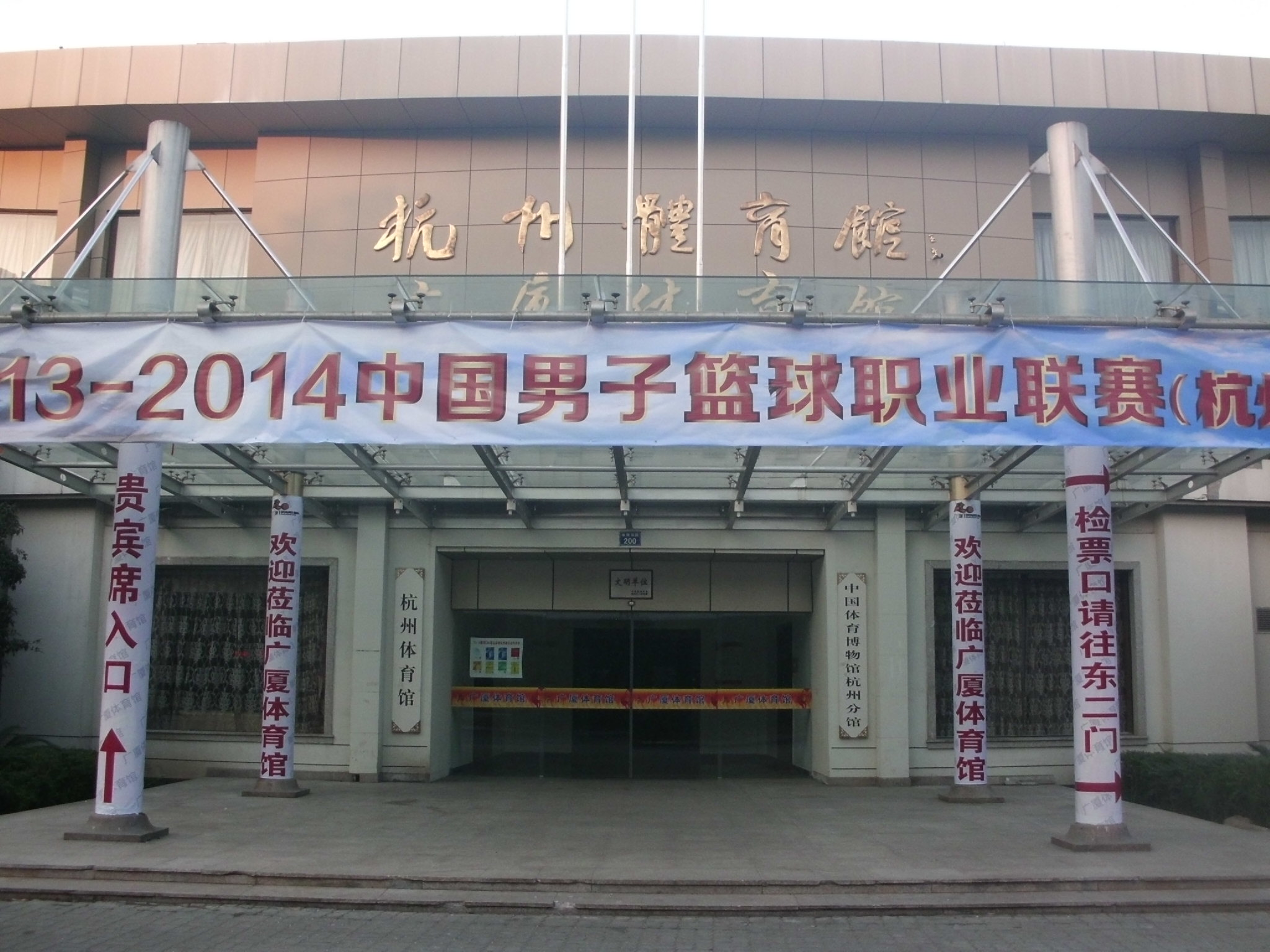
- Interactive map of Hangzhou Gymnasium 杭州广厦体育馆
- Full name: Hangzhou Gymnasium
- Location: Hangzhou, China
- Capacity: 5,136

Construction
- Opened: 1966

Tenant
- Zhejiang Lions (CBA)

Hangzhou Gymnasium is an indoor sporting arena located in Hangzhou, China. The capacity of the arena is 5,136 spectators and opened in 1966. It hosts indoor sporting events such as basketball and volleyball. It hosts the Zhejiang Lions of the Chinese Basketball Association.
