= Beijing Royal Fighters =

Chinese professional basketball team

Beijing Royal Fighters 北京紫禁勇士
- Leagues: CBA
- Founded: 2009; 17 years ago
- History: Guangzhou Free Man (2009–2012); Chongqing Fly Dragons (2012–2015); Beikong Fly Dragons (2015–2019); Beijing Royal Fighters (2019–present)
- Arena: Beijing Olympic Sports Center Gymnasium
- Capacity: 6,500
- Location: Beijing, China
- Team colors: Purple, Gold, White
- Main sponsor: Nanhai Corporation (2009–2012); Black Valley (2012–2015); Beijing BG / Beikong (2015–present)
- Team manager: Lü Jinqing
- Head coach: Charis Markopoulos
- Ownership: Li Chunli
- Championships: None
| Home | Away |

The Beijing Royal Fighters (Chinese: 北京紫禁勇士; pinyin: Běijīng Zǐjìn Yǒngshì) are a Chinese professional men's basketball team which is based in Beijing and plays in the Northern Division of the Chinese Basketball Association (CBA). Beijing BG (known in Chinese as 北京控股) is the club's corporate sponsor.

== History ==
The franchise was founded in 2009 in Guangzhou and spent its first five seasons of existence competing in the lower levels of China's basketball league system. The team relocated to Chongqing in 2012. The club entered the CBA in the 2014–15 season as an expansion team and finished at the bottom of the league standings with a record of 4–34.

In September 2015, the club relocated again and was initially renamed Beijing BG, but to avoid confusion with the city's association football team, which is also called Beijing BG, as well as to avoid confusion with the Beijing Ducks when only the geographical names of the clubs are used, a large number of Chinese sports websites refer to the team as the Beikong Fly Dragons.

== Current roster ==
Note: Flags indicate national team eligibility at FIBA-sanctioned events. Players may hold other non-FIBA nationalities not displayed.

Beijing Royal Fighters roster
Players
Coaches

| Pos. | No. | Nat. | Name | Ht. | Wt. | Age |
|---|---|---|---|---|---|---|
| F/C | 1 | (United States) | Harry Giles III | 2.08 m (6 ft 10 in) | 109 kg (240 lb) | 28 – 22 April 1998 |
| G | 2 | (China) | Liao Sanning | 1.92 m (6 ft 4 in) | 80 kg (176 lb) | 25 – 29 January 2001 |
| G/F | 3 | (China) | Fan Huiliu | 1.91 m (6 ft 3 in) | 88 kg (194 lb) | 28 – 3 August 1998 |
| G | 4 | (China) | Ge Zhipeng | 1.90 m (6 ft 3 in) | 85 kg (187 lb) | 20 – 1 January 2006 |
| F | 5 | (China) | Zhao Jiayi | 2.06 m (6 ft 9 in) | 99 kg (218 lb) | 27 – 6 January 1999 |
| G | 6 | (China) | Zhang Fan | 1.93 m (6 ft 4 in) | 85 kg (187 lb) | 30 – 2 January 1996 |
| G | 7 | (China) | Ding Boyu | 1.90 m (6 ft 3 in) | 80 kg (176 lb) | 20 – 16 April 2006 |
| F | 8 | (China) | Zhu Songwei | 2.06 m (6 ft 9 in) | 101 kg (223 lb) | 29 – 9 November 1996 |
| C | 10 | (China) | Zou Yuchen | 2.07 m (6 ft 9 in) | 125 kg (276 lb) | 30 – 5 July 1996 |
| F | 11 | (China) | Jin Xin | 1.97 m (6 ft 6 in) | 106 kg (234 lb) | 31 – 10 January 1995 |
| F/C | 12 | (China) | Shen Zijie | 2.10 m (6 ft 11 in) | 114 kg (251 lb) | 29 – 3 September 1997 |
| F/C | 14 | (China) | Wang Shaojie | 2.08 m (6 ft 10 in) | 102 kg (225 lb) | 21 – 14 March 2005 |
| G | 15 | (United States) | Javonte Cooke | 1.97 m (6 ft 6 in) | 85 kg (187 lb) | 27 – 11 July 1999 |
| G | 18 | (China) | Song Wenhao | 2.01 m (6 ft 7 in) | 86 kg (190 lb) | 21 – 16 February 2005 |
| PG | 19 | (China) | Liu Xiaoyu | 1.90 m (6 ft 3 in) | 83 kg (183 lb) | 37 – 14 March 1989 |
| G | 24 | (United States) | Grant Riller | 1.85 m (6 ft 1 in) | 86 kg (190 lb) | 29 – 8 February 1997 |
| F | 25 | (China) | Gu Jinwei | 1.98 m (6 ft 6 in) | 85 kg (187 lb) | 18 – 17 November 2007 |
| PF | 28 | (China) | Zhang Yijiong | 2.06 m (6 ft 9 in) | 97 kg (214 lb) | 21 – 14 March 2005 |
| PG | 30 | (China) | Bai Xiaotong | 1.86 m (6 ft 1 in) | 83 kg (183 lb) | 19 – 18 May 2007 |
| G | 33 | (China) | Luo Hanchen | 1.85 m (6 ft 1 in) | 83 kg (183 lb) | 32 – 23 August 1994 |

Head coach

- (Greece) Charis Markopoulos

Assistant coach(es)

- (China) Zhang Zhaoxu
- (China) Han Shuo

Legend

- (C) Team captain
- Injured

- Roster
Updated: September 30, 2026

== Honours ==
Seri Mutiara Cup champion 2017
