= Tianjin Pioneers =

Tianjin Ronggang Pioneers 天津荣钢先行者
- Leagues: CBA
- Founded: 2007
- History: Tianjin Gold Lions (2007–2019); Tianjin Pioneers (2019-present)
- Arena: Dongli Gymnasium; Tianjin Arena
- Capacity: 10,000
- Location: Tianjin, China
- Team colors: Blue, Red
- Main sponsor: Ronggang I&E Trade
- Head coach: Kyle Julius
- Championships: None
Home	Away	Third

The Tianjin Ronggang Pioneers (simplified Chinese: 天津荣钢先行者; traditional Chinese: 天津榮鋼先行者; pinyin: Tiānjīn Rónggāng Xiānxíngzhě) or Tianjin Ronggang or Tianjin Pioneers, officially Tianjin Ronggang Basketball Club Ltd., are a Chinese professional basketball team based in Tianjin, which plays in the Northern Division of the Chinese Basketball Association (CBA). The Ronggang Import & Export Trade Company, Ltd., is the club's corporate sponsor while its mascot is a gold lion.

== History ==
Tianjin's team joined the league ahead of the 2008–09 CBA season as an expansion club, and is still seeking its first championship as of the 2015–16 CBA season.

== Roster ==
Note: Flags indicate national team eligibility at FIBA-sanctioned events. Players may hold other non-FIBA nationalities not displayed.

Tianjin Pioneers roster
Players
Coaches

Pos.	No.	Nat.	Name	Ht.	Wt.
PG	1	(United States)	Jaden Shackelford	1.91 m (6 ft 3 in)	90 kg (198 lb)
PG	2	(United States)	Daishen Nix	1.96 m (6 ft 5 in)	90 kg (198 lb)
PG	3	(China)	Gu Zeyu	1.81 m (5 ft 11 in)	78 kg (172 lb)
PF	5	(China)	Lai Junhao	2.06 m (6 ft 9 in)	91 kg (201 lb)
G	7	(China)	He Jiaxuan	2.00 m (6 ft 7 in)	95 kg (209 lb)
PF	8	(China)	Yue Hongbo	2.03 m (6 ft 8 in)	97 kg (214 lb)
SF	12	(China)	Ji Yansong	2.03 m (6 ft 8 in)	93 kg (205 lb)
G/F	13	(China)	Zhang Yunmeng	1.96 m (6 ft 5 in)	89 kg (196 lb)
G/F	15	(China)	Zheng Haoran	1.98 m (6 ft 6 in)	88 kg (194 lb)
PF	16	(China)	Tian Yu	2.05 m (6 ft 9 in)	97 kg (214 lb)
G	17	(China)	Sun Chengxin	1.86 m (6 ft 1 in)	85 kg (187 lb)
F/C	18	(China)	Wang Yuding	2.05 m (6 ft 9 in)	105 kg (231 lb)
C	20	(Chad)	Khalifa Koumadje	2.24 m (7 ft 4 in)	121 kg (267 lb)
PG	21	(China)	Lu Anyu	1.90 m (6 ft 3 in)	84 kg (185 lb)
F/C	22	(China)	Liu Dong	2.09 m (6 ft 10 in)	107 kg (236 lb)
F/C	23	(China)	Shi Deshuai	2.05 m (6 ft 9 in)	105 kg (231 lb)
PF	24	(China)	Li Zonglin	2.04 m (6 ft 8 in)	99 kg (218 lb)
G/F	28	(China)	Ma Ruyi	1.95 m (6 ft 5 in)	90 kg (198 lb)
G	30	(China)	Jiang Qiyu	1.95 m (6 ft 5 in)	90 kg (198 lb)
G/F	77	(China)	He Siyu	1.97 m (6 ft 6 in)	98 kg (216 lb)

Head coach

- (Canada) Kyle Julius

Assistant coach(es)

- (China) Zhang Degui
- (China) Meng Xianglong

Legend

- (C) Team captain
- Injured

- Roster
Updated: October 22, 2026

== Notable players ==
Note: Flags indicate national team eligibility at FIBA-sanctioned events. Players may hold other non-FIBA nationalities not displayed.

Criteria

To appear in this section a player must have either:

- Set a club record or won an individual award while at the club
- Played at least one official international match for their national team at any time
- Played at least one official NBA match at any time.

- (France) / (Ivory Coast) Hervé Lamizana (2009–2012)
- (United States) Donnell Harvey (2011–2013)
- (Jordan) Zaid Abbas (2013–2014)
- (United States) Sebastian Telfair (2013–2014)
- (United States) Shelden Williams (2013–2015)
- (China) Shang Ping (2014–2016)
- (United States) Quincy Douby (2014)
- (United States) Dwight Buycks (2014–2015)
- (United States) Jason Maxiell (2015–2016)
- (United States) Casper Ware (2015–2016)
- (United States) Jordan Crawford (2015–2016)
- (Chinese Taipei) Tien Lei (2014–2018)
