= Nanjing Monkey Kings =

Chinese professional basketball team

Nanjing Monkey Kings 南京大圣
- League: CBA
- Founded: 2007; 19 years ago
- History: Jiangsu Monkey Kings (2007–2017); Nanjing Monkey Kings (2017–present)
- Arena: Nanjing Youth Olympic Sports Park
- Capacity: 21,000
- Location: Nanjing, Jiangsu, China
- Team colors: Navy, Gold, White, Red
- Head coach: Wang Shilong
- Ownership: Jiangsu Tongxi Group
- Championships: None
- Website: www.tongxiclub.com
| Home | Away | Third |

The Nanjing Monkey Kings (simplified Chinese: 南京大圣; traditional Chinese: 南京大聖; pinyin: Nánjīng Dàshèng) are a Chinese professional basketball team based in Nanjing, Jiangsu, which plays in the Southern Division of the Chinese Basketball Association (CBA). The club joined the league ahead of the 2014–15 CBA season as the Jiangsu Monkey Kings, after spending its first seven campaigns at the lower levels of the country's basketball hierarchy. The team was renamed the Nanjing Monkey Kings after the 2016–17 CBA season.

== Roster ==
Note: Flags indicate national team eligibility at FIBA-sanctioned events. Players may hold other non-FIBA nationalities not displayed.

Nanjing Monkey Kings roster
Players
Coaches

| Pos. | No. | Nat. | Name | Ht. | Wt. |
|---|---|---|---|---|---|
| PG | 0 | (China) | Zheng Boxuan | 1.89 m (6 ft 2 in) | 70 kg (154 lb) |
| PG | 1 | (China) | Liu Ye | 1.89 m (6 ft 2 in) | 87 kg (192 lb) |
| PF | 2 | (China) | Li Yunkai | 2.04 m (6 ft 8 in) | 105 kg (231 lb) |
| G | 3 | (China) | Li Binzhuo | 1.89 m (6 ft 2 in) | 81 kg (179 lb) |
| G | 4 | (United States) | Tazé Moore | 1.96 m (6 ft 5 in) | 88 kg (194 lb) |
| PG | 5 | (China) | Jiang He | 1.80 m (5 ft 11 in) | 80 kg (176 lb) |
| G | 6 | (China) | Yin Chunwen | 1.76 m (5 ft 9 in) | 73 kg (161 lb) |
| F | 7 | (China) | Zhu Mingzhen | 1.97 m (6 ft 6 in) | 112 kg (247 lb) |
| SF | 8 | (China) | Xu Yuanzheng | 1.90 m (6 ft 3 in) | 88 kg (194 lb) |
| SG | 10 | (China) | Guo Haowen | 2.03 m (6 ft 8 in) | 90 kg (198 lb) |
| SF | 11 | (China) | Ma Yandong | 2.01 m (6 ft 7 in) | 85 kg (187 lb) |
| F | 15 | (China) | Hubulang Mamaiti | 2.04 m (6 ft 8 in) | 115 kg (254 lb) |
| F | 18 | (China) | Da Runwang | 2.06 m (6 ft 9 in) | 109 kg (240 lb) |
| C | 19 | (Senegal) | Youssoupha Fall | 2.21 m (7 ft 3 in) | 125 kg (276 lb) |
| C | 20 | (China) | Ma Xinxin | 2.11 m (6 ft 11 in) | 110 kg (243 lb) |
| PF | 22 | (United States) | Robert Franks | 2.03 m (6 ft 8 in) | 102 kg (225 lb) |
| SF | 24 | (China) | Abdusemet Maitiabra | 2.01 m (6 ft 7 in) | 95 kg (209 lb) |
| F/C | 28 | (China) | Liu Shuangyu | 2.17 m (7 ft 1 in) | 109 kg (240 lb) |
| G | 95 | (China) | Liu Yihang | 1.88 m (6 ft 2 in) | 70 kg (154 lb) |

Head coach

- (China) Wang Shilong

Assistant coach(es)

- (China) Sun Mingyang
- (China) Ma Yanlan
- (China) Chen Shaocong

Legend

- (C) Team captain
- Injured

- Roster
Updated: October 21, 2026

== Notable former players ==
- (United States) Antonio Blakeney
- (Senegal) Tacko Fall
- (United States) Willie Cauley-Stein
