= Shenzhen Leopards =

- Leagues: CBA; The Asian Tournament
- Founded: 2003; 23 years ago
- History: Dongguan New Century Leopards (2003–2015); Shenzhen New Century Leopards (2015–2019); Shenzhen Aviators (2019–2021); Shenzhen Leopards (2021–present)
- Arena: Shenzhen Arena
- Capacity: 15,000
- Location: 2006 Sungang Xi Road, Futian, Shenzhen, Guangdong, China
- Team colors: Red, Gold, Black, White
- Head coach: Gu Quan
- Championships: None
Home	Away	Third

Shenzhen Leopards
- Traditional Chinese: 深圳烈豹
- Simplified Chinese: 深圳烈豹
Transcriptions
Standard Mandarin
- Hanyu Pinyin: Shēnzhèn Liè Bào

Shenzhen Leopards Basketball Club, previously known as Shenzhen Aviators, are a Chinese professional basketball team which plays in the Southern Division of the Chinese Basketball Association (CBA) and The Asian Tournament. New Century is the club's corporate sponsor. The team is based in Futian District, Shenzhen, Guangdong, and plays its home games at Shenzhen Arena.

== History ==
The club was founded in 2003 as Dongguan New Century Leopards and was initially located in Dongguan, Guangdong. After twelve seasons, the team relocated to nearby Shenzhen in 2015. Success came early as they were the runners-up in the 2004 Chinese Basketball League (CBL) championship, and were promoted to the Chinese Basketball Association (CBA) for the 2005–06 season.

In its first season in the CBA, Dongguan finished at last place in the South Division, and was out of the playoffs. The team would soon battle its way to respectability, becoming somewhat regular participant in the CBA's postseason over the ensuing years.

In July 2011, the NBA point guard Jeremy Lin played for the team at the ABA Club Championship, and was named the MVP of the tournament.

On December 26, 2013, Bobby Brown scored a franchise-record 74 points in a game against Sichuan Blue Whales.

In 2024, the club moved to Shenzhen Arena.

== Current roster ==
Note: Flags indicate national team eligibility at FIBA-sanctioned events. Players may hold other non-FIBA nationalities not displayed.

Shenzhen Leopards roster
Players
Coaches

Pos.	No.	Nat.	Name	Ht.	Wt.
SF	1	(China)	Wu Zihan	2.02 m (6 ft 8 in)	88 kg (194 lb)
SF	2	(China)	Lu Pengyu	1.97 m (6 ft 6 in)	83 kg (183 lb)
G/F	3	(China)	He Xining	1.95 m (6 ft 5 in)	90 kg (198 lb)
G	5	(China)	Sun Haoqin	1.95 m (6 ft 5 in)	84 kg (185 lb)
PF	6	(China)	Fu Wenhao	2.04 m (6 ft 8 in)	95 kg (209 lb)
PG	8	(China)	Rong Zifeng	1.86 m (6 ft 1 in)	82 kg (181 lb)
PG	10	(China)	Bai Haotian	1.95 m (6 ft 5 in)	87 kg (192 lb)
C	16	(Senegal)	Ibou Badji	2.18 m (7 ft 2 in)	115 kg (254 lb)
SG	17	(China)	Ma Mingkun	1.95 m (6 ft 5 in)	95 kg (209 lb)
PG	19	(China)	Geng Pengyu	1.85 m (6 ft 1 in)	78 kg (172 lb)
PG	20	(United States)	Markell Johnson	1.86 m (6 ft 1 in)	86 kg (190 lb)
C	21	(China)	Li Muhao	2.18 m (7 ft 2 in)	120 kg (265 lb)
PG	22	(China)	Lan Yilang	1.91 m (6 ft 3 in)	75 kg (165 lb)
F/C	24	(China)	Shan Zeyu	2.06 m (6 ft 9 in)	95 kg (209 lb)
F	26	(China)	Ma Haosen	1.98 m (6 ft 6 in)	88 kg (194 lb)
F/C	28	(China)	Feng Xirui	2.10 m (6 ft 11 in)	98 kg (216 lb)
G	31	(China)	Chen Xiaoyi	1.93 m (6 ft 4 in)	87 kg (192 lb)
PF	33	(China)	Wang Haoran	2.05 m (6 ft 9 in)	97 kg (214 lb)
PF	35	(China)	Yu Qiuyang	2.06 m (6 ft 9 in)	95 kg (209 lb)
F	37	(China)	Wu Yibo	2.00 m (6 ft 7 in)	93 kg (205 lb)
SG	77	(United States)	Terquavion Smith	1.93 m (6 ft 4 in)	75 kg (165 lb)

Head coach

- (China) Gu Quan

Assistant coach(es)

- (Canada) James Duncan
- (China) Chen Kai
- (China) Zheng Yongguang

Legend

- (C) Team captain
- Injured

- Roster
Updated: October 1, 2026

== Notable players ==
- Set a club record or won an individual award as a professional player.
- Played at least one official international match for his senior national team at any time.

- (China) Shen Zijie
- (United States) Askia Booker
- (United States) Josh Christopher
- (United States) Daryl Macon
