= 1995–96 Chinese Basketball Association season =

- League: CBA
- Season: 1995–96
- Duration: 10 December 1995–6 March 1996 (regular season); 10 March–7 April 1996 (playoffs); 31 March–7 April 1996 (finals)
- Teams: 12

Regular season
- Season champions: Bayi Rockets
- Season MVP: (China) Hu Weidong (Jiangsu Dragons)
- Relegated: Nanjing Army; Vanguard/Police

Finals
- Champions: Bayi Rockets (1st title)
- Runners-up: Guangdong Southern Tigers
- Semi-finalists: Beijing Ducks; Liaoning Hunters

Awards
- CBA Coach of the Year: Wang Fei (Bayi Rockets); Wang Lifa (Guangdong Southern Tigers)

Statistical leaders
Points	(China) Hu Weidong (Jiangsu Dragons)	28.0
Rebounds	(China) Yu Leping (Zhejiang Squirrels)	13.0
Assists	(China) Huang Yunlong (Guangdong Southern Tigers)	4.4

The 1995–96 CBA season was the first season of the Chinese Basketball Association. The season was held from 10 December 1995 to 7 April 1996.

The league had 12 teams for its inaugural campaign and every club played each other twice in the regular season.

== Teams ==
Team	Head coach	City	Arena	Capacity
Air Force	(China) Ma Lianzhong			
Bayi Rockets	(China) Wang Fei			
Beijing Ducks	(China) Yuan Chao			
Guangdong Southern Tigers	(China) Wang Lifa			
Jiangsu Dragons	(China) Yi Dehua			
Jinan Army	(China) Zhang Bin			
Liaoning Hunters	(China) Li Ge			
Nanjing Army	(China) Yang Xuezeng			
Shandong Flaming Bulls	(China) Zhao Xuanmin			
Shenyang Army	(China) Xuan Chengbin			
Vanguard/Police	(China) Yu Long			
Zhejiang Squirrels	(China) Pan Jianping			

== Regular season ==
=== League table ===
Rank	1995–96 CBA regular season					
Rank	Team	W	L	Pts	Pct.	Tiebreaker
1	Bayi Rockets	22	0	44	100.0%	
2	Guangdong Southern Tigers	18	4	40	81.8%	
3	Liaoning Hunters	18	4	40	81.8%	
4	Beijing Ducks	17	5	39	77.3%	
5	Shandong Flaming Bulls	12	10	34	54.5%	
6	Zhejiang Squirrels	10	12	32	45.5%	
7	Jinan Army	9	13	31	40.9%	
8	Shenyang Army	8	14	30	36.4%	
9	Air Force	7	15	29	31.8%	
10	Jiangsu Dragons	6	16	28	27.3%	
11	Nanjing Army	4	18	26	18.2%	
12	Vanguard/Police	1	21	23	4.5%	

Key to colors
Qualification for quarter-finals
Qualification for 5th–8th place playoffs
Qualification for relegation playoffs

=== Results ===
12 teams played against each other teams twice.

Home \ Away	AFO	BYR	BJD	GDS	JSD	JNA	LNH	NJA	SDB	SYA	VAN	ZJS
Air Force		75–103	74–86	71–83	92–73	78–80	86–89	76–68	85–94	60–67	116–83	87–68
Bayi Rockets	101–56		100–69	108–80	128–89	117–78	108–80	101–88	83–63	115–82	117–87	99–69
Beijing Ducks	64–58	74–98		84–77	89–61	86–77	89–70	101–77	80–70	83–55	85–56	79–59
Guangdong Southern Tigers	106–75	86–97	68–60		96–60	95–80	92–69	100–73	89–68	98–81	89–84	111–78
Jiangsu Dragons	70–67	80–109	70–96	81–89		82–68	78–87	97–106	61–72	87–81	95–84	70–71
Jinan Army	87–78	76–109	72–64	72–87	77–67		63–75	89–71	87–65	60–73	86–83	59–84
Liaoning Hunters	91–69	65–87	92–75	98–78	107–86	98–74		109–58	96–78	90–68	107–87	104–54
Nanjing Army	60–95	79–95	66–79	94–99	83–88	90–78	85–99		85–94	78–80	92–89	72–94
Shandong Flaming Bulls	83–78	71–95	51–63	69–72	97–80	90–78	74–80	92–90		93–66	84–70	51–75
Shenyang Army	82–72	63–88	78–87	88–92	97–76	66–68	70–79	92–77	80–93		84–78	67–70
Vanguard/Police	61–80	74–100	64–87	67–95	69–93	83–96	74–89	85–88	73–88	80–68		60–79
Zhejiang Squirrels	65–75	79–108	57–62	77–104	84–70	83–74	67–70	87–81	73–83	55–60	61–51	

Legend: Blue = home team win; Red = away team win.
Matches with lighter background shading were decided after overtime.

== Playoffs ==
The Playoffs used a Home-Away system. Total points were used to decide the winner.

=== Bracket ===
Semi-finals
1	Bayi Rockets	96	112	2
4	Beijing Ducks	76	100	0
2	Guangdong Southern Tigers	81	74	2
3	Liaoning Hunters	79	69	0

Finals
1	Bayi Rockets	97	88	2
2	Guangdong Southern Tigers	63	74	0
Third place game
4	Beijing Ducks	72	73	1 (145)
3	Liaoning Hunters	75	62	1 (137)

5–8th classification semi-finals
5	Shandong Flaming Bulls	67	106	1 (173)
8	Shenyang Army	68	63	1 (131)
6	Zhejiang Squirrels	74	77	1 (151)
7	Jinan Army	66	78	1 (144)

Fifth place game
5	Shandong Flaming Bulls	76	71	2
6	Zhejiang Squirrels	61	45	0
Seventh place game
8	Shenyang Army	57	87	1 (144)
7	Jinan Army	63	82	1 (145)

Relegation playoffs
9	Air Force	78	75	2
12	Vanguard/Police	64	67	0
10	Jiangsu Dragons	75	102	1 (177)
11	Nanjing Army	79	93	1 (172)

Ninth place game
9	Air Force	65	81	2
10	Jiangsu Dragons	58	64	0

- Bold Series winner

=== Semi-finals ===
==== (1) Bayi Rockets vs. (4) Beijing Ducks ====
10 March 1996
19:30

Boxscore

Beijing Ducks	76–96	Bayi Rockets
Scoring by quarter: –, –, –, –

17 March 1996
19:30

Boxscore

Bayi Rockets	112–100	Beijing Ducks
Scoring by quarter: –, –, –, –

==== (2) Guangdong Southern Tigers vs. (3) Liaoning Hunters ====
10 March 1996
19:30

Boxscore

Liaoning Hunters	79–81	Guangdong Southern Tigers
Scoring by quarter: –, –, –, –

17 March 1996
19:30

Boxscore

Guangdong Southern Tigers	74–69	Liaoning Hunters
Scoring by quarter: –, –, –, –

=== Finals ===
==== (1) Bayi Rockets vs. (2) Guangdong Southern Tigers ====
31 March 1996
19:30

Boxscore

Guangdong Southern Tigers	63–97	Bayi Rockets
Scoring by quarter: –, –, –, –

7 April 1996
19:30

Boxscore

Bayi Rockets	88–74	Guangdong Southern Tigers
Scoring by quarter: –, –, –, –

=== Third place game ===
==== (3) Liaoning Hunters vs. (4) Beijing Ducks ====
27 March 1996
19:30

Boxscore

Liaoning Hunters	75–72	Beijing Ducks
Scoring by quarter: –, –, –, –

7 April 1996
19:30

Boxscore

Beijing Ducks	73–62	Liaoning Hunters
Scoring by quarter: –, –, –, –

=== 5–8th classification semi-finals ===
==== (5) Shandong Flaming Bulls vs. (8) Shenyang Army ====
10 March 1996
19:30

Boxscore

Shenyang Army	68–67	Shandong Flaming Bulls
Scoring by quarter: –, –, –, –

17 March 1996
19:30

Boxscore

Shandong Flaming Bulls	106–63	Shenyang Army
Scoring by quarter: –, –, –, –

==== (6) Zhejiang Squirrels vs. (7) Jinan Army ====
13 March 1996
19:30

Boxscore

Jinan Army	66–74	Zhejiang Squirrels
Scoring by quarter: –, –, –, –

20 March 1996
19:30

Boxscore

Zhejiang Squirrels	77–78	Jinan Army
Scoring by quarter: –, –, –, –

=== Fifth place game ===
==== (5) Shandong Flaming Bulls vs. (6) Zhejiang Squirrels ====
24 March 1996
19:30

Boxscore

Zhejiang Squirrels	61–76	Shandong Flaming Bulls
Scoring by quarter: –, –, –, –

3 April 1996
19:30

Boxscore

Shandong Flaming Bulls	71–45	Zhejiang Squirrels
Scoring by quarter: –, –, –, –

=== Seventh place game ===
==== (7) Jinan Army vs. (8) Shenyang Army ====
24 March 1996
19:30

Boxscore

Jinan Army	63–57	Shenyang Army
Scoring by quarter: –, –, –, –

31 March 1996
19:30

Boxscore

Shenyang Army	87–82	Jinan Army
Scoring by quarter: –, –, –, –

=== Relegation playoffs ===
==== (9) Air Force vs. (12) Vanguard/Police ====
13 March 1996
19:30

Boxscore

Vanguard/Police	64–78	Air Force
Scoring by quarter: –, –, –, –

20 March 1996
19:30

Boxscore

Air Force	75–67	Vanguard/Police
Scoring by quarter: –, –, –, –

==== (10) Jiangsu Dragons vs. (11) Nanjing Army ====
13 March 1996
19:30

Boxscore

Nanjing Army	79–75	Jiangsu Dragons
Scoring by quarter: –, –, –, –

20 March 1996
19:30

Boxscore

Jiangsu Dragons	102–93	Nanjing Army
Scoring by quarter: –, –, –, –

=== Ninth place game ===
==== (9) Air Force vs. (10) Jiangsu Dragons ====
27 March 1996
19:30

Boxscore

Jiangsu Dragons	58–65	Air Force
Scoring by quarter: –, –, –, –

3 April 1996
19:30

Boxscore

Air Force	81–64	Jiangsu Dragons
Scoring by quarter: –, –, –, –

== All-Star Game ==
The first CBA All-Star Game was played on April 9, 1996, in Beijing.

The Blue Team, featuring players including Wang Zhizhi and Adiljan Jun, defeated the White Team 106–98.

== Statistics ==
=== Individual statistic leaders ===
Category	Player	Team(s)	Statistic
Points per game	Hu Weidong	Jiangsu Dragons	28.0
Rebounds per game	Yu Leping	Zhejiang Squirrels	13.0
Assists per game	Huang Yunlong	Guangdong Southern Tigers	4.4
Steals per game	Ju Weisong	Shandong Flaming Bulls	3.5
Blocks per game	Wang Zhizhi	Bayi Rockets	3.8
Turnovers per game	Hu Weidong	Jiangsu Dragons	4.6
Fouls per game	Shen Zhenhai	Jiangsu Dragons	3.9
Minutes per game	Ju Weisong	Shandong Flaming Bulls	39.7
FG%	Ma Yongzhong	Guangdong Southern Tigers	67.3%
FT%	Yu Xuepeng	Liaoning Hunters	85.0%
3P%	Li Nan	Bayi Rockets	64.0%

=== Team statistic leaders ===
Category	Team	Statistic
Points per game	Bayi Rockets	103.0
Rebounds per game	Guangdong Southern Tigers	34.3
Assists per game	Guangdong Southern Tigers	14.5
Steals per game	Bayi Rockets	11.5
Blocks per game	Bayi Rockets	5.7
Turnovers per game	Jinan Army	14.5
Fouls per game	Air Force	17.9
FG%	Bayi Rockets	56.7%
FT%	Bayi Rockets	70.6%
3P%	Bayi Rockets	44.9%

== Awards ==
These are the award winners for the 1995-96 CBA regular season.

=== Annual awards ===
1995–96 CBA awards
Award	Recipient(s)
CBA Most Valuable Player	Hu Weidong (Jiangsu Dragons)
CBA Coach of the Year	Wang Fei (Bayi Rockets); Wang Lifa (Guangdong Southern Tigers)
