= 2016 CBA Playoffs =

Chinese Basketball Association tournament

The 2016 CBA Playoffs is the postseason tournament of the Chinese Basketball Association's 2015–16 season.

The Sichuan Blue Whales won their first CBA championship after defeating the Liaoning Flying Leopards in the CBA finals.

== Bracket ==
Teams in bold advanced to the next round. The numbers to the left of each team indicate the team's seeding, and the numbers to the right indicate the number of games the team won in that round. Teams with home court advantage are shown in italics.

Quarterfinals; Best of 5
1	**Liaoning Flying Leopards**	**3**
8	Zhejiang Golden Bulls	0
4	**Guangdong Southern Tigers**	**3**
5	Shandong Golden Stars	0
2	**Xinjiang Flying Tigers**	**3**
7	Beijing Ducks	1
3	**Sichuan Blue Whales**	**3**
6	Zhejiang Guangsha Lions	0

Semifinals; Best of 5
1	**Liaoning Flying Leopards**	**3**
4	Guangdong Southern Tigers	1
2	Xinjiang Flying Tigers	0
3	**Sichuan Blue Whales**	**3**

Finals; Best of 7
1	Liaoning Flying Leopards	1
3	**Sichuan Blue Whales**	**4**

- **Bold** Series winner
- Italics Team with home-court advantage

== First round ==
All times are in China standard time (UTC+8)

=== (1) Liaoning Flying Leopards vs. (8) Zhejiang Golden Bulls ===
February 15
19:35

**Liaoning Flying Leopards** **116**, Zhejiang Golden Bulls 108
Scoring by quarter: 24–**34**, **29**–22, **28**–27, **35**–25
Pts: Guo Ailun 27; Rebs: Li Xiaoxu 15; Asts: Lester Hudson 9	Pts: Willie Warren 35; Rebs: Charles Gaines 9 Asts: Willie Warren 6
**Liaoning leads series 1–0**

Yiwu Gymnasium, Yiwu, Zhejiang

February 17
19:35

Zhejiang Golden Bulls 105, **Liaoning Flying Leopards** **138**
Scoring by quarter: 21–**36**, 27–**38**, 23–**37**, **34**–27
Pts: Charles Gaines 27; Rebs: Charles Gaines 10; Asts: Willie Warren, Wu Qian 5 each	Pts: Lester Hudson 30; Rebs: Han Dejun, Shavlik Randolph 12 each Asts: Guo Ailun 9
**Liaoning leads series 2–0**

Benxi Gymnasium, Benxi, Liaoning

February 19
19:35

Zhejiang Golden Bulls 111, **Liaoning Flying Leopards** **127**
Scoring by quarter: 25–**30**, 26–**32**, 33–**39**, **27**–26
Pts: Samad Nikkhah Bahrami 22; Rebs: Charles Gaines 17; Asts: Samad Nikkhah Bahrami, Charles Gaines 5 each	Pts: Shavlik Randolph 28; Rebs: Shavlik Randolph 8 Asts: Guo Ailun 11
**Liaoning wins series 3–0**

Benxi Gymnasium, Benxi, Liaoning

=== (2) Xinjiang Flying Tigers vs. (7) Beijing Ducks ===
February 15
19:35

**Xinjiang Flying Tigers** **117**, Beijing Ducks 105
Scoring by quarter: 24–**25**, **35**–25, **28**–22, 30–**33**
Pts: Andray Blatche 29; Rebs: Andray Blatche 16; Asts: Andray Blatche, Bryce Cotton 5 each	Pts: Stephon Marbury 29; Rebs: Randolph Morris 8 Asts: Stephon Marbury 4
**Xinjiang leads series 1–0**

LeSports Center, Beijing

February 17
19:35

Beijing Ducks 101, **Xinjiang Flying Tigers** **104**
Scoring by quarter: **29**–23, **25**–23, 24–**32**, 23–**26**
Pts: Stephon Marbury 32; Rebs: Randolph Morris 9 Asts: Stephon Marbury 4	Pts: Andray Blatche 37; Rebs: Andray Blatche 13; Asts: Andray Blatche 5
**Xinjiang leads series 2–0**

Hongshan Arena, Ürümqi, Xinjiang

February 19
19:35

**Beijing Ducks** **117**, Xinjiang Flying Tigers 99
Scoring by quarter: **30**–25, **33**–31, **29**–26, **25**–17
Pts: Stephon Marbury 37; Rebs: Sun Yue 10; Asts: Stephon Marbury 6	Pts: Andray Blatche 28; Rebs: Andray Blatche, Zhou Qi 8 each Asts: Andray Blatche 7
**Xinjiang leads series 2–1**

Hongshan Arena, Ürümqi, Xinjiang

February 21
19:35

**Xinjiang Flying Tigers** 103, Beijing Ducks 94
Scoring by quarter: **31**–20, **28**–26, 18–**30**, **26**–18
Pts: Andray Blatche 26; Rebs: Zhou Qi 16; Asts: Zhou Qi 3	Pts: Stephon Marbury 29; Rebs: Ji Zhe 11; Asts: Sun Yue 4
**Xinjiang wins series 3–1**

LeSports Center, Beijing

=== (3) Sichuan Blue Whales vs. (6) Zhejiang Lions ===
February 15
19:35

**Sichuan Blue Whales** **139**, Zhejiang Lions 98
Scoring by quarter: **37**–25, **34**–29, **36**–19, **32**–25
Pts: Justin Dentmon 30; Rebs: Mike Harris 10; Asts: Justin Dentmon 7	Pts: Eli Holman 29; Rebs: Eli Holman 9 Asts: Sun Minghui 7
**Sichuan leads series 1–0**

Hangzhou Gymnasium, Hangzhou, Zhejiang

February 17
19:35

Zhejiang Lions 118, **Sichuan Blue Whales** **131**
Scoring by quarter: 33–**41**, 19–**34**, 32–**35**, **34**–21
Pts: Lin Chih-chieh 41; Rebs: Eli Holman 9 Asts: Sun Minghui 5	Pts: Justin Dentmon 32; Rebs: Hamed Haddadi 19; Asts: Justin Dentmon, Hamed Haddadi 7 each
**Sichuan leads series 2–0**

Sichuan Provincial Stadium, Chengdu, Sichuan

February 19
19:35

Zhejiang Lions 113, **Sichuan Blue Whales** **123**
Scoring by quarter: 29–**33**, **30**–29, **28**–27, 26–**34**
Pts: Lin Chih-chieh 27; Rebs: Eli Holman 10; Asts: Jeremy Pargo 10	Pts: Mike Harris 41; Rebs: Hamed Haddadi 17; Asts: Hamed Haddadi 9
**Sichuan wins series 3–0**

Sichuan Provincial Stadium, Chengdu, Sichuan

=== (4) Guangdong Southern Tigers vs. (5) Shandong Golden Stars ===
February 15
19:35

**Guangdong Southern Tigers** **95**, Shandong Golden Stars 81
Scoring by quarter: **28**–22, **22**–14, 18–**23**, **27**–22
Pts: Justin Carter 24; Rebs: Ike Diogu 18; Asts: Justin Carter 7	Pts: Michael Beasley 32; Rebs: Michael Beasley 17; Asts: Eugene Jeter 3
**Guangdong leads series 1–0**

Shandong Arena, Jinan, Shandong

February 17
19:35

Shandong Golden Stars 111, **Guangdong Southern Tigers** **130**
Scoring by quarter: 21–**30**, 29–**35**, 36–**38**, 25–**27**
Pts: Michael Beasley 37; Rebs: Michael Beasley 15; Asts: Eugene Jeter, Sui Ran 4 each	Pts: Ike Diogu 35; Rebs: Ike Diogu 12; Asts: Justin Carter 8
**Guangdong leads series 2–0**

Dongguan Basketball Center, Dongguan, Guangdong

February 19
19:35

Shandong Golden Stars 105, **Guangdong Southern Tigers** **125**
Scoring by quarter: **31**–29, 30–**35**, 19–**26**, 25–**35**
Pts: Michael Beasley 35; Rebs: Michael Beasley 15; Asts: Michael Beasley 6	Pts: Zhu Fangyu 31; Rebs: Ike Diogu 14; Asts: Justin Carter 4
**Guangdong wins series 3–0**

Dongguan Basketball Center, Dongguan, Guangdong

== Semifinals ==
All times are in China standard time (UTC+8)

=== (1) Liaoning Flying Leopards vs. (4) Guangdong Southern Tigers ===
February 26
19:35

Liaoning Flying Leopards 116, Guangdong Southern Tigers 114 (OT)
Scoring by quarter: 29–17, 33–31, 22–28, 20–28, Overtime: 12-10
Pts: Lester Hudson 29; Rebs: Li Xiaoxu 11; Asts: Guo Ailun 7	Pts: Yi Jianlian 28; Rebs: Ike Diogu 16; Asts: Zhou Peng, Chen Jianghua 4 each
**Liaoning leads series 1-0**

Dongguan Basketball Center, Dongguan, Guangdong

February 28
19:35

Guangdong Southern Tigers 88, Liaoning Flying Leopards 103
Scoring by quarter: 22–22, 25–29, 20–30, 21–22
Pts: Yi Jianlian 23; Rebs: Justin Carter 12; Asts: Zhu Fangyu 5	Pts: Lester Hudson 31; Rebs: Li Xiaoxu 13; Asts: Lester Hudson 7
**Liaoning leads series 2-0**

Benxi Gymnasium, Benxi, Liaoning

March 2
19:35

Guangdong Southern Tigers 97, Liaoning Flying Leopards 96
Scoring by quarter: 18–13, 27–23, 32–30, 20–30
Pts: Yi Jianlian 26; Rebs: Yi Jianlian 10; Asts: Justin Carter 5	Pts: Lester Hudson 34; Rebs: Li Xiaoxu 11; Asts: Yang Ming 4
**Liaoning leads series 2-1**

Benxi Gymnasium, Benxi, Liaoning

Tigers player Zhou Peng knocked down a game winning 3-pointer with the Tigers down one point to bring the series back to Dongguan.

March 4
19:35

Liaoning Flying Leopards 105, Guangdong Southern Tigers 96
Scoring by quarter: 22–26, 26–24, 30–24, 27–22
Pts: Lester Hudson 30; Rebs: Shavlik Randolph 10; Asts: Lester Hudson 7	Pts: Yi Jianlian 27; Rebs: Ike Diogu 12; Asts: Justin Carter 4
**Liaoning wins series 3-1**

Dongguan Basketball Center, Dongguan, Guangdong

=== (2) Xinjiang Flying Tigers Vs. (3) Sichuan Blue Whales ===
February 26
19:35

Liaoning Flying Leopards vs. Guangdong Southern Tigers
Scoring by quarter: –, –, –, –

Dongguan Basketball Center, Dongguan, Guangdong

February 28
19:35

Guangdong Southern Tigers vs. Liaoning Flying Leopards
Scoring by quarter: –, –, –, –

Benxi Gymnasium, Benxi, Liaoning

March 2
19:35

Guangdong Southern Tigers vs. Liaoning Flying Leopards
Scoring by quarter: –, –, –, –

Benxi Gymnasium, Benxi, Liaoning

March 4
19:35

Liaoning Flying Leopards vs. Guangdong Southern Tigers
Scoring by quarter: –, –, –, –

Dongguan Basketball Center, Dongguan, Guangdong

== Finals ==
=== (1) Liaoning Flying Leopards Vs. (3) Sichuan Blue Whales ===
February 26
19:35

Liaoning Flying Leopards vs. Sichuan Blue Whales
Scoring by quarter: –, –, –, –

Benxi Gymnasium, Benxi, Liaoning

March 13
19:35

Sichuan Blue Whales vs. Liaoning Flying Leopards
Scoring by quarter: –, –, –, –

Sichuan Provincial Stadium, Chengdu, Sichuan

March 16
19:35

Sichuan Blue Whales vs. Liaoning Flying Leopards
Scoring by quarter: –, –, –, –

Sichuan Provincial Stadium, Chengdu, Sichuan

March 20
19:35

Liaoning Flying Leopards vs. Sichuan Blue Whales
Scoring by quarter: –, –, –, –

Benxi Gymnasium, Benxi, Liaoning

The series was noted for having a brawl that occurred after the third match of the finals between the Liaoning and Sichuan teams.
