= 1996–97 Chinese Basketball Association season =

- League: CBA
- Season: 1996–97
- Duration: 27 November 1996–26 February 1997 (regular season); 2–30 March 1997 (playoffs); 23–30 March 1997 (finals)
- Teams: 12

Regular season
- Season champions: Bayi Rockets
- Season MVP: (China) Hu Weidong (Jiangsu Dragons)
- Relegated: Zhejiang Squirrels; Jinan Army

Finals
- Champions: Bayi Rockets (2nd title)
- Runners-up: Liaoning Hunters
- Semifinalists: Guangdong Southern Tigers; Shandong Flaming Bulls

Awards
- CBA Coach of the Year: Wang Fei (Bayi Rockets); Li Ge (Liaoning Hunters)

The 1996–97 CBA season was the second season of the Chinese Basketball Association. The season was held from 27 November 1996 to 30 March 1997.

The Shanghai Sharks and Sichuan Pandas were promoted from the Second Division.

== Teams ==
Team	Head coach	City	Arena	Capacity
Air Force	(China) Ma Lianzhong			
Bayi Rockets	(China) Wang Fei			
Beijing Ducks	(China) Yuan Chao			
Guangdong Southern Tigers	(China) Wang Lifa			
Jiangsu Dragons	(China) Xia Hongfa			
Jinan Army	(China) Zhang Bin			
Liaoning Hunters	(China) Li Ge			
Shandong Flaming Bulls	(China) Ye Peng			
Shanghai Sharks	(China) Li Qiuping			
Shenyang Army	(China) Xuan Chengbin			
Sichuan Pandas	(China) Yang Ming			
Zhejiang Squirrels	(China) Pan Jianping			

=== Team changes ===
==== To CBA ====
Teams promoted from Second Division

- Shanghai Sharks
- Sichuan Pandas

==== From CBA ====
Team relegated to Second Division

- Nanjing Army
- Vanguard/Police

== Regular season ==
=== League table ===
Rank	1996–97 CBA regular season					
Rank	Team	W	L	Pts	Pct.	Tiebreaker
1	Bayi Rockets	19	3	41	86.4%	
2	Liaoning Hunters	18	4	40	81.8%	
3	Shandong Flaming Bulls	14	8	36	63.6%	
4	Guangdong Southern Tigers	13	9	35	59.1%	
5	Shanghai Sharks	13	9	35	59.1%	
6	Jiangsu Dragons	12	10	34	54.5%	
7	Air Force	9	13	31	40.9%	
8	Shenyang Army	9	13	31	40.9%	
9	Beijing Ducks	8	14	30	36.4%	
10	Zhejiang Squirrels	7	15	29	31.8%	
11	Sichuan Pandas	7	15	29	31.8%	
12	Jinan Army	3	19	25	13.6%	

Key to colors
Qualification for playoffs
Qualification for relegation playoffs

=== Results ===
12 teams played against each other teams twice.

Home \ Away	AFO	BYR	BJD	GDS	JSD	JNA	LNH	SDB	SHS	SYA	SCP	ZJS
Air Force		75–100	71–75	96–90	83–88	89–69	73–95	73–64	86–68	81–77	85–83	69–79
Bayi Rockets	105–64		102–85	108–82	107–69	104–82	80–92	89–76	90–88	98–83	115–83	105–60
Beijing Ducks	70–77	82–114		96–92	70–75	89–64	85–95	95–74	72–91	63–68	96–74	74–49
Guangdong Southern Tigers	95–76	100–90	78–63		97–82	108–75	78–84	89–94	66–77	86–83	81–76	77–58
Jiangsu Dragons	85–89	83–98	83–77	83–85		108–94	101–113	95–80	73–72	85–73	100–84	90–69
Jinan Army	64–85	90–127	77–81	68–76	98–103		85–105	77–82	81–85	79–70	81–73	69–64
Liaoning Hunters	97–76	81–98	85–71	90–89	85–67	96–68		73–79	97–69	94–83	87–77	77–50
Shandong Flaming Bulls	92–73	79–109	92–74	69–82	93–78	85–70	80–95		98–72	95–76	76–66	88–70
Shanghai Sharks	82–56	61–75	65–70	68–85	90–73	80–73	68–64	65–62		68–47	89–76	68–53
Shenyang Army	84–81	92–83	70–63	86–56	72–76	82–74	80–106	68–78	74–68		97–82	71–59
Sichuan Pandas	67–65	68–77	67–62	75–67	92–99	83–73	96–89	71–91	71–78	74–65		78–71
Zhejiang Squirrels	74–53	70–83	70–58	98–101	80–77	77–63	76–90	69–72	49–59	57–54	80–64	

Legend: Blue = home team win; Red = away team win.
Matches with lighter background shading were decided after overtime.

== Playoffs ==
The top 8 teams in the regular season advanced to the playoffs.

=== Bracket ===
Fifth place game
5	Shanghai Sharks	90	68	1 (158)
6	Jiangsu Dragons	73	96	1 (169)
Seventh place game
8	Shenyang Army	99	75	1 (174)
7	Air Force	94	97	1 (191)

5–8th classification semi-finals
8	Shenyang Army	92	72	1 (164)
5	Shanghai Sharks	91	94	1 (185)
6	Jiangsu Dragons	121	105	2
7	Air Force	118	99	0

Quarter-finals
1	Bayi Rockets	128	110	2
8	Shenyang Army	78	69	0
4	Guangdong Southern Tigers	84	87	2
5	Shanghai Sharks	74	82	0
3	Shandong Flaming Bulls	102	77	2
6	Jiangsu Dragons	72	74	0
2	Liaoning Hunters	80	85	2
7	Air Force	55	77	0

Semi-finals
1	Bayi Rockets	109	119	2
4	Guangdong Southern Tigers	81	84	0
3	Shandong Flaming Bulls	70	77	0
2	Liaoning Hunters	93	78	2

Finals
1	Bayi Rockets	100	102	2
2	Liaoning Hunters	68	66	0
Third place game
4	Guangdong Southern Tigers	87	78	1 (165)
3	Shandong Flaming Bulls	69	79	1 (148)

=== Quarter-finals ===
==== (1) Bayi Rockets vs. (8) Shenyang Army ====
2 March 1997
19:30

Boxscore

Bayi Rockets	128–78	Shenyang Army
Scoring by quarter: –, –, –, –

5 March 1997
19:30

Boxscore

Shenyang Army	69–110	Bayi Rockets
Scoring by quarter: –, –, –, –

==== (2) Liaoning Hunters vs. (7) Air Force ====
2 March 1997
19:30

Boxscore

Liaoning Hunters	80–55	Air Force
Scoring by quarter: –, –, –, –

5 March 1997
19:30

Boxscore

Air Force	77–85	Liaoning Hunters
Scoring by quarter: –, –, –, –

==== (3) Shandong Flaming Bulls vs. (6) Jiangsu Dragons ====
2 March 1997
19:30

Boxscore

Shandong Flaming Bulls	102–72	Jiangsu Dragons
Scoring by quarter: –, –, –, –

5 March 1997
19:30

Boxscore

Jiangsu Dragons	74–77	Shandong Flaming Bulls
Scoring by quarter: –, –, –, –

==== (4) Guangdong Southern Tigers vs. (5) Shanghai Sharks ====
2 March 1997
19:30

Boxscore

Guangdong Southern Tigers	84–74	Shanghai Sharks
Scoring by quarter: –, –, –, –

5 March 1997
19:30

Boxscore

Shanghai Sharks	82–87	Guangdong Southern Tigers
Scoring by quarter: –, –, –, –

=== Semi-finals ===
==== (1) Bayi Rockets vs. (4) Guangdong Southern Tigers ====
9 March 1997
19:30

Boxscore

Bayi Rockets	109–81	Guangdong Southern Tigers
Scoring by quarter: –, –, –, –

16 March 1997
19:30

Boxscore

Guangdong Southern Tigers	84–119	Bayi Rockets
Scoring by quarter: –, –, –, –

==== (2) Liaoning Hunters vs. (3) Shandong Flaming Bulls ====
12 March 1997
19:30

Boxscore

Liaoning Hunters	93–70	Shandong Flaming Bulls
Scoring by quarter: –, –, –, –

16 March 1997
19:30

Boxscore

Shandong Flaming Bulls	77–78	Liaoning Hunters
Scoring by quarter: –, –, –, –

=== 5–8th classification semi-finals ===
==== (5) Shanghai Sharks vs. (8) Shenyang Army ====
9 March 1997
19:30

Boxscore

Shenyang Army	92–91	Shanghai Sharks
Scoring by quarter: –, –, –, –

16 March 1997
19:30

Boxscore

Shanghai Sharks	94–72	Shenyang Army
Scoring by quarter: –, –, –, –

==== (6) Jiangsu Dragons vs. (7) Air Force ====
12 March 1997
19:30

Boxscore

Air Force	118–121	Jiangsu Dragons
Scoring by quarter: –, –, –, –

16 March 1997
19:30

Boxscore

Jiangsu Dragons	105–99	Air Force
Scoring by quarter: –, –, –, –

=== Finals ===
==== (1) Bayi Rockets vs. (2) Liaoning Hunters ====
23 March 1997
19:30

Boxscore

Bayi Rockets	100–68	Liaoning Hunters
Scoring by quarter: –, –, –, –

30 March 1997
19:30

Boxscore

Liaoning Hunters	66–102	Bayi Rockets
Scoring by quarter: –, –, –, –

=== Third place game ===
==== (3) Shandong Flaming Bulls vs. (4) Guangdong Southern Tigers ====
23 March 1997
19:30

Boxscore

Guangdong Southern Tigers	87–69	Shandong Flaming Bulls
Scoring by quarter: –, –, –, –

30 March 1997
19:30

Boxscore

Shandong Flaming Bulls	79–78	Guangdong Southern Tigers
Scoring by quarter: –, –, –, –

=== Fifth place game ===
==== (5) Shanghai Sharks vs. (6) Jiangsu Dragons ====
19 March 1997
19:30

Boxscore

Shanghai Sharks	90–73	Jiangsu Dragons
Scoring by quarter: –, –, –, –

26 March 1997
19:30

Boxscore

Jiangsu Dragons	96–68	Shanghai Sharks
Scoring by quarter: –, –, –, –

=== Seventh place game ===
==== (7) Air Force vs. (8) Shenyang Army ====
19 March 1997
19:30

[ Boxscore]

Shenyang Army	99–94	Air Force
Scoring by quarter: –, –, –, –

26 March 1997
19:30

[ Boxscore]

Air Force	97–75	Shenyang Army
Scoring by quarter: –, –, –, –

== Relegation playoffs ==
The bottom 4 teams advanced to relegation playoffs. The Zhejiang Squirrels and Jinan Army were relegated to the Second Division after the relegation playoffs.

=== League table ===
Rank	Relegation playoffs					
Rank	Team	W	L	Pts	Pct.	Tiebreaker
9	Beijing Ducks	5	1	11	83.3%	
10	Sichuan Pandas	4	2	10	66.7%	
11	Zhejiang Squirrels	3	3	9	50.0%	
12	Jinan Army	0	6	6	0.0%	

Key to colors
Relegation to Second Division

=== Games ===
9 March 1997
19:30

Boxscore

Beijing Ducks	92–82	Jinan Army
Scoring by quarter: –, –, –, –

9 March 1997
19:30

Boxscore

Zhejiang Squirrels	71–67	Sichuan Pandas
Scoring by quarter: –, –, –, –

12 March 1997
19:30

Boxscore

Jinan Army	75–92	Beijing Ducks
Scoring by quarter: –, –, –, –

12 March 1997
19:30

Boxscore

Sichuan Pandas	74–64	Zhejiang Squirrels
Scoring by quarter: –, –, –, –

19 March 1997
19:30

Boxscore

Beijing Ducks	71–64	Sichuan Pandas
Scoring by quarter: –, –, –, –

19 March 1997
19:30

Boxscore

Jinan Army	77–90	Zhejiang Squirrels
Scoring by quarter: –, –, –, –

23 March 1997
19:30

Boxscore

Sichuan Pandas	76–70	Beijing Ducks
Scoring by quarter: –, –, –, –

23 March 1997
19:30

Boxscore

Zhejiang Squirrels	85–71	Jinan Army
Scoring by quarter: –, –, –, –

26 March 1997
19:30

Boxscore

Beijing Ducks	95–69	Zhejiang Squirrels
Scoring by quarter: –, –, –, –

26 March 1997
19:30

Boxscore

Sichuan Pandas	81–69	Jinan Army
Scoring by quarter: –, –, –, –

30 March 1997
19:30

Boxscore

Zhejiang Squirrels	66–80	Beijing Ducks
Scoring by quarter: –, –, –, –

30 March 1997
19:30

Boxscore

Jinan Army	79–85	Sichuan Pandas
Scoring by quarter: –, –, –, –

== All-Star Weekend ==
The 1997 CBA All-Star Game was played on April 5, 1997, in Shanghai.

The South All-Stars defeated the North All-Stars 98–84. Hu Weidong from the Jiangsu Dragons was named MVP of the All-Star Game.

James Hodges from the Liaoning Hunters won the Slam Dunk Contest, and Saulius Štombergas from the Shanghai Sharks won the Three-Point Shootout.

== Statistics ==
=== Team statistic leaders ===
Category	Team	Statistic
Points per game	Bayi Rockets	98.0
Rebounds per game	Liaoning Hunters; Zhejiang Squirrels	31.0
Assists per game	Liaoning Hunters	14.5
Steals per game	Bayi Rockets	12.0
Blocks per game	Shanghai Sharks	4.9
Turnovers per game	Sichuan Pandas	14.7
Fouls per game	Air Force	20.0
FG%	Shandong Flaming Bulls	57.0%
FT%	Liaoning Hunters	70.4%
3P%	Liaoning Hunters	43.8%

== Awards ==
These are the award winners for the 1996-97 CBA regular season.

=== Annual awards ===
1996–97 CBA awards
Award	Recipient(s)
CBA Most Valuable Player	Hu Weidong (Jiangsu Dragons)
CBA Coach of the Year	Wang Fei (Bayi Rockets); Li Ge (Liaoning Hunters)
