= Chinese Basketball Association =

Top professional men's basketball league in China

- Organising body: Chinese Basketball Management Center
- Founded: 1995; 31 years ago
- First season: 1995–96
- Country: China
- Federation: Chinese Basketball Association
- Confederation: FIBA Asia
- Divisions: 2
- Number of teams: 20
- Level on pyramid: 1
- Relegation to: National Basketball League (NBL)
- International cup: Basketball Champions League Asia
- Current champions: Shanghai Sharks (2nd title) (2025–26)
- Most championships: Guangdong Southern Tigers (11 titles)
- Most appearances: Zhou Peng (740)
- All-time top scorer: Lester Hudson (13,076)
- TV partners: CCTV, Douyin
- Website: CBALeague.com

Chinese Basketball Association
- Traditional Chinese: 中國男子籃球職業聯賽
- Simplified Chinese: 中国男子篮球职业联赛
Transcriptions
Standard Mandarin
- Hanyu Pinyin: Zhōngguó Nánzǐ Lánqiú Zhíyè Liánsài
- Bopomofo: ㄓㄨㄥ ㄍㄨㄛˊ ㄋㄢˊ ㄗˇ ㄌㄢˊ ㄑㄧㄡˊ ㄓˊ ㄧㄝˋ ㄌㄧㄢˊ ㄙㄞˋ
- Gwoyeu Romatzyh: Jonggwo Nantzyy Lanchyou Jyryeh Liansay
- Wade–Giles: Chung^{1}-kuo^{2} Nan^{2}-tzu^{3} Lan^{2}-ch'iu^{2} Chih^{2}-yeh^{4} Lien^{2}-sai^{4}
- IPA: [ʈʂʊ́ŋkwǒ nǎntsɹ̩̀ lǎntɕʰjǒʊ ʈʂɻ̩̌jê ljɛ̌nsâɪ]

The Chinese Basketball Association (simplified Chinese: 中国男子篮球职业联赛; traditional Chinese: 中國男子籃球職業聯賽; pinyin: Zhōngguó Nánzǐ Lánqiú Zhíyè Liánsài; lit. 'Chinese Men's Basketball Professional League'), often abbreviated as the CBA, is the first-tier men's professional basketball league in China.

Fans commonly know the league as the CBA, and this acronym is regularly used in Chinese. There is also a Women's Chinese Basketball Association (WCBA).

A few Chinese players who competed in the CBA in the early stages of their careers—including Wang Zhizhi, Mengke Bateer, Yao Ming, Yi Jianlian, Sun Yue, and Zhou Qi—have also played in the National Basketball Association (NBA). Others, such as Xue Yuyang and Wang Zhelin, were chosen in the draft, but did not play in the NBA.

Only a limited number of foreign players are allowed on each CBA team. Notable imports include former NBA All-Stars Stephon Marbury, Tracy McGrady, Gilbert Arenas, Steve Francis, Metta World Peace and Kenyon Martin—as well as several NBA veterans who would become CBA All-Stars—Michael Beasley, Aaron Brooks, Jimmer Fredette, Al Harrington, Lester Hudson, Randolph Morris, Shavlik Randolph, Jeremy Lin and J.R. Smith.

== Background ==
The CBA began play in the 1995–96 season. The league should not be confused with the Chinese Basketball Association (organisation), which was founded in June 1956 and represents the country in matters involving the sport's governing body, FIBA. Basketball in China is currently regulated by the Chinese Basketball Management Center.

Other Chinese basketball leagues include the National Basketball League (NBL), the Chinese University Basketball Association (CUBA), and the Chinese High School Basketball League (CHBL). At one time there was a league called the Chinese New Basketball Alliance (CNBA), one of whose most prominent teams was the Beijing Sea Lions, but this venture lasted for just one winter (1996–97).

The first non-Chinese player to compete in the CBA was Mihail Savinkov of Uzbekistan, who joined the Zhejiang Squirrels in the league's inaugural 1995–96 campaign. During the 1996–97 season, James Hodges became one of the first Americans to play in the CBA, and his signing by the Liaoning Hunters helped pave the way for many more imports from the United States to follow in the ensuing years.

Some other notable foreign pioneers included John Spencer, who joined the Jiangsu Dragons later in the 1996–97 campaign, and David Vanterpool, who inked a deal with the Jilin Northeast Tigers the following winter, who helped the team move up to the CBA in time for the 1998–99 season. The CBA's first international coach was American Robert Hoggard, who led the Sichuan Pandas for the last eight games of the 1997–98 campaign.

In June 2026, the CBA announced it would resume promotion-relegation, with the National Basketball League (NBL) acting as a second tier on the pyramid.

== Team names ==
For a full list of teams, see Current clubs section below. Also see Category:Chinese Basketball Association teams.

The full name of each team usually consists of three parts, in the following order:

1. A geographic designation (except in the case of Bayi, which technically translates into English as "August First", the day China's People's Liberation Army was founded). All others are province-level designations (either a province or a Chinese municipality).
2. A corporate sponsor name. This sponsor may change from year to year, and sometimes even in mid-season.
3. A nickname, such as the name of an animal.

The presence of corporate sponsor names can occasionally lead to confusion about what name to use in English because many variants may be seen. Team names are usually abbreviated (in Chinese or English), so that either the corporate sponsor name or the nickname is used interchangeably (rarely both). In addition, team nicknames can sometimes be translated into English in more than one way, and corporate sponsors tend to change frequently over time.

Nickname changes are rare, but occasionally happen, such as when the Shandong team switched from Flaming Bulls (1995) to Lions (2003) to Gold Lions (2004) to Golden Stars (2014). Other examples include the Liaoning team dumping Hunters (1995) for Dinosaurs (2008) and then Flying Leopards (2011) -- as well as the Foshan team's evolving attempts to "Anglicize" its nickname—by going from Kylins (2001) to Dralions to Long-Lions.

In previous years, the title of the league itself was available for corporate naming sponsorship. In 1999–2000 and 2000–2001 it was known as the Hilton League, in 2001–2002 and 2002–2003 it was the Motorola League, and in 2003–2004 it was sponsored by China Unicom. These corporate league titles were not always used in the news media, however, and this sponsorship practice was discontinued at the start of the 2004–2005 season.

== Current clubs ==
While clubs are listed by division here, the CBA does not use these designations for regular season purposes anymore, as each squad now plays each other once at home and once on the road (plus eight additional games within each of the four rotating "strength of schedule" sub-groupings). Divisions are used for the league's annual All-Star Game, however, and are shown here for the sake of convenience.

Location of the CBA clubs

Club		Home City	Arena	Head coach
Club name	Name in Chinese	Home City	Arena	Head coach
Northern Division
Beijing Ducks	北京首钢霹雳鸭	Beijing	Wukesong Arena	(China) Li Nan
Beijing Royal Fighters	北京紫禁勇士	Beijing	Beijing Olympic Sports Center Gymnasium	(Greece) Charis Markopoulos
Jilin Northeast Tigers	吉林九台农商行东北虎	Changchun, Jilin; Jilin City, Jilin	Changchun Gymnasium; Jilin City Arena	(China) Li Ang
Liaoning Flying Leopards	辽宁沈阳三生飞豹	Shenyang, Liaoning	Liaoning Gymnasium	(Spain) Hugo López
Qingdao Eagles	青岛国信海天雄鹰	Qingdao, Shandong	Guoxin Gymnasium	(China) Liu Weiwei
Shandong Hi-Speed Kirin	山东高速麒麟	Jinan, Shandong	Shandong Arena	(China) Qiu Biao
Shanxi Loongs	山西汾酒猛龙	Taiyuan, Shanxi	Shanxi Sports Centre Gymnasium; Taiyuan Riverside Sports Centre Gymnasium	(Lithuania) Vytautas Buzas
Sichuan Blue Whales	四川锦城蓝鲸	Chengdu, Sichuan	Jinqiang International Event Center	(Slovenia) Simon Petrov
Tianjin Pioneers	天津荣钢先行者	Tianjin	Dongli Gymnasium; Tianjin Arena	(Canada) Kyle Julius
Xinjiang Flying Tigers	新疆广汇飞虎	Ürümqi, Xinjiang	Urumqi Olympic Sports Center	(South Korea) Jiang Zhengxiu
Southern Division
Fujian Sturgeons	福建鲟浔兴	Jinjiang, Quanzhou, Fujian	Zuchang Gymnasium	(Serbia) Aleksandar Kesar
Guangdong Southern Tigers	广东宏远华南虎	Dongguan, Guangdong	Bank of Dongguan Basketball Center	(Serbia) Nenad Jakovljević
Guangzhou Loong Lions	广州龙狮	Guangzhou, Guangdong	Tianhe Gymnasium	(United States) Doron Perkins
Jiangsu Dragons	江苏龙肯帝亚	Suzhou, Jiangsu	Suzhou Sports Center Gymnasium	(China) Yi Li
Nanjing Monkey Kings	南京同曦大圣	Nanjing, Jiangsu	Nanjing Youth Olympic Sports Park Arena	(China) Wang Shilong
Ningbo Rockets	宁波富邦火箭	Ningbo, Zhejiang	Youngor Arena	(Serbia) Oliver Kostić
Shanghai Sharks	上海久事大鲨鱼	Shanghai	Shanghai Indoor Stadium (Shanghai Arena)	(China) Lu Wei
Shenzhen Leopards	深圳新世纪烈豹	Shenzhen, Guangdong	Shenzhen Gymnasium	(China) Gu Quan
Zhejiang Golden Bulls	浙江稠州金牛	Hangzhou, Zhejiang; Yiwu, Jinhua, Zhejiang	Binjiang Gymnasium; Yiwu Meihu Sports Centre Gymnasium	(Greece) Alexis Falekas
Zhejiang Guangsha Lions	浙江广厦雄狮	Hangzhou, Zhejiang; Zhuji, Shaoxing, Zhejiang	Hangzhou Gymnasium; Zhuji Sports Centre Gymnasium	(China) Wang Bo

=== Timeline ===
This is a chronological listing of current and former CBA teams according to the season that they entered the league.

Current teams Defunct Teams

== Finals ==
In 2005, the league unveiled the Mou Zuoyun Cup (Chinese: 牟作云杯), which was awarded for the first time to the winning team in the CBA Finals. Mou Zuoyun (1913–2007) was a member of the Chinese men's national basketball team which competed at the 1936 Summer Olympics, and he later served as a coach and a pioneer in building Chinese basketball.

Season	Champions	Result	Runners-up	Finals MVP	Notes	Winning team coach
1995–96	Bayi Rockets	2–0	Guangdong Southern Tigers		Home-and-away series used for two seasons	Wang Fei
1996–97	Bayi Rockets	2–0	Liaoning Hunters			Wang Fei
1997–98	Bayi Rockets	3–0	Liaoning Hunters		Best-of-five series used for eight seasons	Wang Fei
1998–99	Bayi Rockets	3–0	Liaoning Hunters			Wang Fei
1999–00	Bayi Rockets	3–0	Shanghai Sharks	Wang Zhizhi (Bayi)		Zhang Bin
2000–01	Bayi Rockets	3–1	Shanghai Sharks	Yao Ming (Shanghai)		Wang Fei
2001–02	Shanghai Sharks	3–1	Bayi Rockets	Liu Yudong (Bayi)		Li Qiuping
2002–03	Bayi Rockets	3–1	Guangdong Southern Tigers	Liu Yudong (Bayi)		Adiljan Suleyman
2003–04	Guangdong Southern Tigers	3–1	Bayi Rockets	Du Feng (Guangdong)		Li Chunjiang
2004–05	Guangdong Southern Tigers	3–2	Jiangsu Dragons	Zhu Fangyu (Guangdong)		Li Chunjiang
2005–06	Guangdong Southern Tigers	4–1	Bayi Rockets	Yi Jianlian (Guangdong)	Best-of-seven series used since 2005–06	Li Chunjiang
2006–07	Bayi Rockets	4–1	Guangdong Southern Tigers	Wang Zhizhi (Bayi)		Adiljan Suleyman
2007–08	Guangdong Southern Tigers	4–1	Liaoning Hunters	Zhu Fangyu (Guangdong)		Li Chunjiang
2008–09	Guangdong Southern Tigers	4–1	Xinjiang Flying Tigers	Zhu Fangyu (Guangdong)		Li Chunjiang
2009–10	Guangdong Southern Tigers	4–1	Xinjiang Flying Tigers	Zhu Fangyu (Guangdong)		Li Chunjiang
2010–11	Guangdong Southern Tigers	4–2	Xinjiang Flying Tigers	Wang Shipeng (Guangdong)		Li Chunjiang
2011–12	Beijing Ducks	4–1	Guangdong Southern Tigers	Lee Hsueh-lin (Beijing)		Min Lulei
2012–13	Guangdong Southern Tigers	4–0	Shandong Gold Lions	Yi Jianlian		Du Feng Jonas Kazlauskas
2013–14	Beijing Ducks	4–2	Xinjiang Flying Tigers	Randolph Morris (Beijing)		Min Lulei
2014–15	Beijing Ducks	4–2	Liaoning Flying Leopards	Stephon Marbury (Beijing)		Min Lulei
2015–16	Sichuan Blue Whales	4–1	Liaoning Flying Leopards	Hamed Haddadi (Sichuan)		Yang Xuezeng
2016–17	Xinjiang Flying Tigers	4–0	Guangdong Southern Tigers	Darius Adams (Xinjiang)		Li Qiuping
2017–18	Liaoning Flying Leopards	4–0	Zhejiang Guangsha Lions	Lester Hudson (Liaoning)		Guo Shiqiang
2018–19	Guangdong Southern Tigers	4–0	Xinjiang Flying Tigers	Yi Jianlian (Guangdong)		Du Feng
2019–20	Guangdong Southern Tigers	2–1	Liaoning Flying Leopards	Sonny Weems (Guangdong)	Best-of-three series due to the COVID-19 pandemic	Du Feng
2020–21	Guangdong Southern Tigers	2–1	Liaoning Flying Leopards	Hu Mingxuan (Guangdong)	Best-of-three series due to the COVID-19 pandemic	Du Feng
2021–22	Liaoning Flying Leopards	4–0	Zhejiang Guangsha Lions	Zhao Jiwei (Liaoning)	Best-of-seven series returns	Yang Ming
2022–23	Liaoning Flying Leopards	4–0	Zhejiang Golden Bulls	Zhao Jiwei (Liaoning)		Yang Ming
2023–24	Liaoning Flying Leopards	4–0	Xinjiang Flying Tigers	Kyle Fogg (Liaoning)		Yang Ming
2024–25	Zhejiang Lions	4–2	Beijing Ducks	Barry Brown Jr. (Zhejiang)		Wang Bo
2025–26	Shanghai Sharks	4–1	Zhejiang Lions	Brandon Goodwin (Shanghai)		Lu Wei

=== Finals appearances ===
This is a list of the teams which have advanced to the CBA Finals and the overall win–loss records they have registered in the Championship Series.

Ranking	Team	Title(s)	Runners-up	Pct.
1	Guangdong Southern Tigers	11	5	.688
2	Bayi Rockets (defunct)	8	3	.727
3	Liaoning Flying Leopards	4	8	.333
4	Beijing Ducks	3	1	.750
5	Shanghai Sharks	2	2	.500
6	Xinjiang Flying Tigers	1	6	.143
7	Zhejiang Lions	1	3	.250
8	Sichuan Blue Whales	1	0	1.000
9	Jiangsu Dragons	0	1	.000
9	Shandong Gold Lions	0	1	.000
9	Zhejiang Golden Bulls	0	1	.000

== CBA Club Cup Finals ==
Season	Champions	Result	Runners-up	CBA Club Cup Finals MVP	Notes	Winning team coach
2024–25	Shanghai Sharks	89–80	Xinjiang Flying Tigers	Eric Bledsoe (Shanghai)		Lu Wei
2025–26	Shanghai Sharks	114–94	Shanxi Loongs	Kenneth Lofton Jr. (Shanghai)		Lu Wei

=== CBA Club Cup Finals appearances ===
This is a list of the teams which have advanced to the CBA Club Cup Finals and the overall win–loss records they have registered in the Championship Series.

Total	Team	Title(s)	Runners-up	Pct.
2	Shanghai Sharks	2	0	1.000
1	Xinjiang Flying Tigers	0	1	.000
1	Shanxi Loongs	0	1	.000

== Awards ==
The CBA Most Valuable Player award is presented to the league's best player in a given CBA season. Since the 2012–13 campaign, two awards have been handed out each year, Domestic MVP and International MVP. The rules for the selection of the MVP in the regular season are: the number of games must reach 28 or more; The comprehensive score of individual technical indicators ranks among the best; The team won the top three in the regular season. At the conclusion of each season, the CBA Finals MVP award is bestowed upon the most outstanding player in that year's championship series.

Each campaign's scoring leader is also recognized on an annual basis and the league maintains a list of single game, single season, and career record holders in various statistical categories. Furthermore, a CBA All-Star Game MVP award is given to the player deemed to have the most impactful performance in the league's annual mid-season exhibition contest.

The CBA Best Defender award is presented to the league's most hard-skilled and efficient defender in a given season of the CBA.

== Scoring leaders ==
The CBA's highest single season scoring average, depending on how many games are required to be recognized as a statistical qualifier, is either 43.1 points per game by Jordan Crawford, who played in 26 of Tianjin's 38 games (68.4%) in 2015–16, or 42.0 points per game by Jonathan Gibson, who played in 36 of Qingdao's 38 games (94.7%) in 2015–16.

== Records ==
This is a list of individual records separated into two categories — career records and single game records.

Records last updated and confirmed on March 13, 2019, the final day of the 2018–19 CBA regular season.

=== Single game records ===
Record	Num.	Player(s)	Team(s)	Game(s)	Date(s)
Points	82	(United States) Errick McCollum	Zhejiang Golden Bulls	Zhejiang Golden Bulls 119–129 Guangdong Southern Tigers	January 30, 2015
Rebounds	38	(Dominica) Garth Joseph	Shaanxi Kylins	Shaanxi Kylins 139–88 Shenzhen Yikang	March 20, 2002
Assists	28	(China) Li Qun	Guangdong Southern Tigers	Guangdong Southern Tigers 110–101 Nanjing Army	February 2, 2000
Steals	13	(China) Ju Weisong	Shandong Flaming Bulls	Shandong Flaming Bulls 84–70 Vanguard / Police	1995–96 Season
Steals	13	(China) Zhang Yongjun	Guangdong Southern Tigers	Bayi Rockets 109–81 Guangdong Southern Tigers	1996–97 Season
Steals	13	(China) Hu Xuefeng	Jiangsu Dragons	Jiangsu Dragons 135–108 Jilin Northeast Tigers	December 1, 2004
Blocks	13	(China) Yao Ming	Shanghai Sharks	Jilin Northeast Tigers 126–118 Shanghai Sharks	February 11, 2001
Blocks	13	(Ivory Coast) Herve Lamizana	Tianjin Gold Lions	Tianjin Gold Lions 113–108 Fujian Sturgeons	February 10, 2010
Blocks	13	(United States) Sean Williams	Fujian Sturgeons	Fujian Sturgeons 101–94 Jilin Northeast Tigers	February 26, 2010
Minutes Played	67	(Iran) Samad Nikkhah Bahrami	Fujian Sturgeons	Fujian Sturgeons 178–177 (5OT) Zhejiang Golden Bulls	February 9, 2014
3-Pointers Made	15	(United States) Leon Rodgers	Jilin Northeast Tigers	Jilin Northeast Tigers 124–110 Shanxi Brave Dragons	March 11, 2009
Dunks Made	10	(United States) James Hodges	Liaoning Hunters	Liaoning Hunters 95–85 Shandong Flaming Bulls	1998–99 Season
Free Throws Made	25	(United States) Errick McCollum	Zhejiang Golden Bulls	Zhejiang Golden Bulls 119–129 Guangdong Southern Tigers	January 30, 2015

=== Career records ===
Record	Num.	Player	Team(s)	Seasons
Points	11,677+	(China) Yi Jianlian (active)	Guangdong Southern Tigers	2002–2003 to 2006–2007 / 2011–2012 to present
Rebounds	5,516+	(China) Yi Jianlian (active)	Guangdong Southern Tigers	2002–2003 to 2006–2007 / 2011–2012 to present
Assists	2,595	(China) Hu Xuefeng	Jiangsu Dragons	1999–2000 to 2016–2017
Steals	1,762	(China) Hu Xuefeng	Jiangsu Dragons	1999–2000 to 2016–2017
Blocks	852	(China) Wang Zhizhi	Bayi Rockets	1995–1996 to 2000–2001 / 2006–2007 to 2014–2015
Minutes Played (Only available since 2011)	14,785+	(United States) Lester Hudson (active)	Guangdong Southern Tigers; Qingdao Eagles; Dongguan Leopards; Xinjiang Flying Tigers; Liaoning Flying Leopards; Shandong Heroes	2010–2011 to present
3-Pointers Made	1,755+	(United States) Lester Hudson (active)	Guangdong Southern Tigers; Qingdao Eagles; Dongguan Leopards; Xinjiang Flying Tigers; Liaoning Flying Leopards; Shandong Heroes	2010–2011 to present
Dunks Made	1130+	(China) Yi Jianlian (active)	Guangdong Southern Tigers	2002–2003 to 2006–2007 / 2011–2012 to present
Free Throws Made	2,666+	(China) Yi Jianlian (active)	Guangdong Southern Tigers	2002–2003 to 2006–2007 / 2011–2012 to present
Personal Fouls	1,615+	(China) Li Xiaoxu (active)	Liaoning Flying Leopards	2005–present
Turnovers	1,584	(China) Hu Xuefeng	Jiangsu Dragons	1999–2000 to 2016–2017
Games played	698	(China) Zhu Fangyu	Guangdong Southern Tigers	1999–2000 to 2016–2017

== Notable players ==
Listed below are some of the most accomplished Chinese players who have competed in the CBA. Time spent with teams in lower leagues before they joined the CBA, or after they left the CBA, cannot be counted as CBA seasons. Notes will be made of such service below a player's CBA information.

=== Domestic players from the CBA who are known for crossing over to the NBA ===
Name	CBA Team(s) (Years)	NBA Team(s) (Year/s)	Drafted
(China) Mengke Bateer	Beijing Ducks (1997–2002, 2005–2006); Xinjiang Flying Tigers (2007–2013)	Denver Nuggets (2002); San Antonio Spurs (2002–2003); Toronto Raptors (2003–2004)	Undrafted in 1999 NBA draft
(China) Sun Yue	Beijing Olympians (2002–2004); Beijing Ducks (2013–2017); Beikong Royal Fighters (2019–present); Also played for post-CBA Beijing Olympians (2004–2008, 2009–2013)	Los Angeles Lakers (2008–2009)	2007 / Round 2 / 40th overall pick Selected by the Los Angeles Lakers
(China) Wang Zhizhi	Bayi Rockets (1995–2001, 2006–2015)	Dallas Mavericks (2001–2002); Los Angeles Clippers (2002–2003); Miami Heat (2003–2005)	1999 / Round 2 / 36th overall pick Selected by the Dallas Mavericks
(China) Yao Ming	Shanghai Sharks (1997–2002)	Houston Rockets (2002–2011)	2002 / Round 1 / 1st overall pick Selected by the Houston Rockets
(China) Yi Jianlian	Guangdong Southern Tigers (2002–2007, 2011, 2012–2023)	Milwaukee Bucks (2007–2008); New Jersey Nets (2008–2010); Washington Wizards (2010–2011); Dallas Mavericks (2012)	2007 / Round 1 / 6th overall pick Selected by the Milwaukee Bucks
(China) Zhou Qi	Xinjiang Flying Tigers (2014–2017)	Houston Rockets (2017–2018)	2016 / Round 2 / 46th overall pick Selected by the Houston Rockets
(China) Cui Yongxi	Guangzhou Loong Lions (2022–2024)	Brooklyn Nets (2024)	Undrafted in 2024 NBA draft
(China) Yang Hansen	Qingdao Eagles (2023–2024)	Portland Trail Blazers (2025–present)	2025 / Round 1 / 16th overall pick Selected by the Memphis Grizzlies
(China) Zeng Fanbo	Beijing Ducks (2022–2024)	Brooklyn Nets (2025)	Undrafted in 2022 NBA draft

=== Domestic players from the CBA who were drafted but have not played in the NBA ===
Name	CBA Team(s) (Years)	Drafted
(China) Wang Zhelin	Fujian Sturgeons (2012–present)	2016 / Round 2 / 57th overall pick Selected by the Memphis Grizzlies
(China) Xue Yuyang	Jilin Northeast Tigers (2001–2002); Hong Kong Flying Dragons (2002–2003); Xinjiang Flying Tigers (2003–2010); Zhejiang Guangsha Lions (2010–2011); Qingdao Eagles (2011–2014)	2003 / Round 2 / 57th overall pick Selected by the Dallas Mavericks

=== Domestic players from the CBA who have only played in NBA pre-season games ===
Name	CBA Team(s) (Years)	NBA Team (Pre-season)
(China) Ding Yanyuhang	Shandong Gold Lions/Golden Stars (2011–2018)	Dallas Mavericks (2018–2019)
(China) Liu Wei	Shanghai Sharks (1997–2014, 2018–2019); Xinjiang Flying Tigers (2014–2016); Sichuan Blue Whales (2016–2018)	Sacramento Kings (2004–2005)

=== Domestic players from the CBA who have participated in the NBA Summer League ===
Name	CBA Team (Years)	NBA Team (Summer League)
(China) Abdusalam Abdurixit	Xinjiang Flying Tigers (2015–present)	Golden State Warriors (2018)
(China) Ding Yanyuhang	Shandong Gold Lions/Golden Stars (2011–2018)	Dallas Mavericks (2017)
(China) He Tianju	Liaoning Dinosaurs/Flying Leopards (2010–present)	New Orleans Pelicans (2015)

Note: The Red Squad of the Chinese National Team toured the United States and played several NBA Summer League teams during the 2018 NBA Summer League season while the combined Chinese National Team did likewise during the 2019 NBA Summer League season.

=== Domestic players from the CBA who are known for league or national team exploits ===
Scroll down to view more names.

- (China) Du Feng ~ Guangdong Southern Tigers 1997–98, 1998–99, 1999–2000, 2000–01, 2001–02, 2002–03, 2003–04, 2004–05, 2005–06, 2006–07, 2007–08, 2008–09, 2009–10, 2010–11, 2011–12
- (China) Gong Xiaobin ~ Shandong Flaming Bulls 1995–96, 1996–97, 1997–98, 1998–99, 1999–2000, 2000–01, 2001–02, 2002–03
- (China) Guo Ailun ~ Liaoning Dinosaurs/Flying Leopards 2010–11, 2011–12, 2012–13, 2013–14, 2014–15, 2015–16, 2016–17, 2017–18, 2018–19, 2019–20
- (China) Guo Shiqiang ~ Liaoning Hunters 1995–96, 1996–97, 1997–98, 1998–99, 1999–2000, 2000–01, 2001–02, 2002–03, 2003–04, 2004–05
- (China) Han Dejun ~ Liaoning Hunters/Dinosaurs/Flying Leopards 2007–08, 2008–09, 2009–10, 2010–11, 2011–12, 2012–13, 2013–14, 2014–15, 2015–16, 2016–17, 2017–18, 2018–19, 2019–20
- (China) Hu Weidong ~ Jiangsu Dragons 1995–96, 1996–97, 1997–98, 1998–99, 1999–2000, 2000–01, 2001–02, 2002–03, 2003–04
- (China) Hu Xuefeng ~ Jiangsu Dragons 1999–2000, 2000–01, 2001–02, 2002–03, 2003–04, 2004–05, 2005–06, 2006–07, 2007–08, 2008–09, 2009–10, 2010–11, 2011–12, 2012–13, 2013–14, 2014–15, 2015–16, 2016–17
- (China) Li Gen ~ Shanghai Sharks 2008–09, 2009–10, Qingdao Eagles 2010–11, 2011–12, Beijing Ducks 2012–13, 2013–14, 2014–15, Xinjiang Flying Tigers 2015–16, 2016–17, 2017–18, 2018–19, Shanghai Sharks 2019–20
- (China) Li Nan ~ Bayi Rockets 1995–96, 1996–97, 1997–98, 1998–99, 1999–2000, 2000–01, 2001–02, 2002–03, 2003–04, 2004–05, 2005–06, 2006–07, 2007–08, 2008–09
- (China) Li Xiaoxu ~ Liaoning Hunters/Dinosaurs/Flying Leopards 2005–06, 2006–07, 2007–08, 2008–09, 2009–10, 2010–11, 2011–12, 2012–13, 2013–14, 2014–15, 2015–16, 2016–17, 2017–18, 2018–19, 2019–20
- (China) Liu Yudong ~ Bayi Rockets 1995–96, 1996–97, 1997–98, 1998–99, 1999–2000, 2000–01, 2001–02, 2002–03, 2003–04, 2004–05, Fujian Xunxing 2007–08, 2008–09, 2009–10
- (China) Shang Ping ~ Beijing Ducks 2009–10, Shanxi Brave Dragons 2010–11, 2011–12, Qingdao Eagles 2012–13, Tianjin Gold Lions 2014–15, 2015–16
- (China) Sun Jun ~ Jilin Northeast Tigers 1998–99, 1999–2000, 2000–01, 2001–02, 2002–03, 2003–04, 2004–05, 2005–06
- (China) Sun Mingming ~ Beijing Ducks 2009–10, 2010–11, 2011–12
- (China) Tang Zhengdong ~ Jiangsu Dragons 2003–04, 2004–05, 2005–06, 2006–07, 2007–08, 2008–09, 2009–10, 2010–11, Xinjiang Flying Tigers 2011–12, 2012–13, 2013–14, 2014–15, Foshan Long-Lions 2015–16, Jiangsu Tongxi/Nanjing Monkey Kings 2016–17, 2017–18
- (China) Wang Shipeng ~ Guangdong Southern Tigers 2003–04, 2004–05, 2005–06, 2006–07, 2007–08, 2008–09, 2009–10, 2010–11, 2011–12, 2012–13, 2013–14, 2014–15, 2015–16
- (China) Zhai Xiaochuan ~ Beijing Ducks 2011–12, 2012–13, 2013–14, 2014–15, 2015–16, 2016–17, 2017–18, 2018–19, 2019–20
- (China) Zhang Qingpeng ~ Liaoning Hunters/Dinosaurs 2001–02, 2002–03, 2003–04, 2004–05, 2005–06, 2006–07, 2007–08, 2008–09, 2009–10, Xinjiang Flying Tigers 2010–11, Liaoning Flying Leopards 2011–12, Xinjiang Flying Tigers 2012–13, 2013–14, Beijing Ducks 2014–15, 2015–16, 2016–17, Qingdao Eagles 2017–18, 2018–19, Shandong Heroes 2019–20
- (China) Zhao Tailong ~ Fujian Xunxing/Sturgeons 2007–08, 2008–09, 2009–10, 2010–11, 2011–12, 2012–13, 2013–14, 2014–15, 2015–16, 2016–17, 2017–18, 2018–19, Qingdao Eagles 2019–20
- (China) Zhou Peng ~ Guangdong Southern Tigers 2006–07, 2007–08, 2008–09, 2009–10, 2010–11, 2011–12, 2012–13, 2013–14, 2014–15, 2015–16, 2016–17, 2017–18, 2018–19
- (China) Zhu Fangyu ~ Guangdong Southern Tigers 1999–2000, 2000–01, 2001–02, 2002–03, 2003–04, 2004–05, 2005–06, 2006–07, 2007–08, 2008–09, 2009–10, 2010–11, 2011–12, 2012–13, 2013–14, 2014–15, 2015–16, 2016–17

== Foreign imports ==
Listed below are some of the most accomplished foreign imports who have competed in the CBA. Players must appear in at least one game for the team to receive credit for a season. Someone who signs a contract but never steps on the court does not count.

As of early 2024, over 100 basketball professionals from the United States, Europe, and Australia work in the CBA.

=== Policy ===
Every team can register up to four foreign players per season. During the regular season, the policy of four (maximum) foreign players on the field for four quarters and four times per game (full of one per quarter) is adopted, while the team ranked in the bottom four last season may adopt the policy of four (maximum) foreign players for four quarters and five times per game (full of two times per quarter in the first three quarters and one time per quarter in the last quarter). During the playoffs, all teams will adopt a four-player (maximum) four-period four-times policy for foreign players (maximum of one per period)

=== Non-Chinese players who spent 5 or more seasons in the CBA ===
Scroll down to view more names

- (Jordan) Zaid Abbas ~ Shanghai Sharks 2009–10, Beijing Ducks 2010–11, Fujian Sturgeons 2011–12, Shandong Gold Lions 2012–13, Tianjin Gold Lions 2013–14, Shanxi Brave Dragons 2014–15, Tongxi Monkey Kings 2016–17, Beikong Fly Dragons 2017–18
- (United States) (Nigeria) Josh Akognon ~ Dongguan Leopards 2010–11, 2011–12, Liaoning Flying Leopards 2012–13, Qingdao Eagles 2013–14, Foshan Long-Lions 2014–15, Jilin Northeast Tigers 2015–16
- (United States) Levan Alston Sr. ~ Beijing Ducks 1997–98, 1998–99, 1999–00, 2000–01, 2001–02, Shandong Flaming Bulls 2002–03
- (United States) (Philippines) Andray Blatche ~ Xinjiang Flying Tigers 2014–15, 2015–16, 2016–17, 2017–18, Tianjin Gold Lions 2018–19
- (United States) MarShon Brooks ~ Jiangsu Dragons 2015–16, 2016–17, 2017–18, Guangdong Southern Tigers 2018–19, 2019–20
- (United States) Dwight Buycks ~ Tianjin Gold Lions 2014–15, Fujian Sturgeons 2015–16, 2016–17, Shenzhen Leopards/Aviators 2018–19, 2019–20
- (United States) (Nigeria) Ike Diogu ~ Xinjiang Flying Tigers 2011–12, Guangdong Southern Tigers 2012–13, Dongguan Leopards 2014–15, Guangdong Southern Tigers 2015–16, Tongxi Monkey Kings 2016–17, Sichuan Blue Whales 2017–18
- (United States) Jason Dixon ~ Guangdong Southern Tigers 1998–99, 1999–00, 2000–01, 2002–03, 2003–04, 2004–05, 2005–06, 2006–07, 2007–08, 2008–09
- (United States) Jamaal Franklin ~ Guangsha Lions 2014–15, Shanxi Brave Dragons 2015–16, 2016–17, Sichuan Blue Whales 2017–18, 2018–19, Shanxi Loongs 2019–20
- (United States) Charles Gaines ~ Xinjiang Flying Tigers 2009–10, Qingdao Eagles 2010–11, Shanxi Brave Dragons 2011–12, 2012–13, 2013–14, Zhejiang Golden Bulls 2014–15, 2015–16
- (United States) Jonathan Gibson ~ Guangsha Lions 2013–14, Qingdao Eagles 2015–16, 2017–18, 2018–19, Jiangsu Dragons 2019–20
- (United States) Rod Gregoire ~ Jilin Northeast Tigers 2000–01, 2001–02, 2002–03, 2003–04, 2004–05, 2005–06
- (Iran) Hamed Haddadi ~ Sichuan Blue Whales 2013–14, Qingdao Eagles 2014–15, Sichuan Blue Whales 2015–16, 2016–17, 2017–18, Xinjiang Flying Tigers 2018–19, Nanjing Monkey Kings 2019–20
- (United States) Mike Harris ~ Dongguan Leopards 2007–08, 2008–09, Shanghai Sharks 2010–11, 2011–12, Jiangsu Dragons 2012–13, Zhejiang Golden Bulls 2013–14, Qingdao Eagles 2014–15, Sichuan Blue Whales 2015–16, 2016–17, Fujian Sturgeons 2017–18
- (United States) Donnell Harvey ~ Jiangsu Dragons 2008–09, 2009–10, Tianjin Gold Lions 2011–12, 2012–13, Shandong Gold Lions 2013–14
- (United States) Eli Holman ~ Guangsha Lions 2014–15, 2015–16, 2016–17, Tianjin Gold Lions 2017–18, Jilin Northeast Tigers 2019–20
- (United States) Lester Hudson ~ Guangdong Southern Tigers 2010–11, Qingdao Eagles 2011–12, Dongguan Leopards 2012–13, Xinjiang Flying Tigers 2013–14, Liaoning Flying Leopards 2014–15, 2015–16, 2016–17, 2017–18, 2018–19, Shandong Heroes 2019–20
- (United States) (Ukraine) Eugene "Pooh" Jeter ~ Shandong Gold Lions/Golden Stars 2012–13, 2013–14, 2014–15, 2015–16, Tianjin Gold Lions 2016–17, 2017–18, Fujian Sturgeons 2018–19, 2019–20
- (United States) Dominique Jones ~ Liaoning Flying Leopards 2013–14, Jilin Northeast Tigers 2014–15, Shanxi Brave Dragons 2015–16, Qingdao Eagles 2016–17, Nanjing Monkey Kings 2017–18, Jilin Northeast Tigers 2018–19, 2019–20
- (United States) Stephon Marbury ~ Shanxi Brave Dragons 2009–10, Foshan Dralions 2010–11, Beijing Ducks 2011–12, 2012–13, 2013–14, 2014–15, 2015–16, 2016–17, Beikong Fly Dragons 2017–18
- (United States) Will McDonald ~ Fujian Sturgeons 2011–12, 2012–13, 2013–14, Tongxi Monkey Kings 2014–15, Jiangsu Dragons 2015–16
- (United States) Randolph Morris ~ Beijing Ducks 2010–11, 2011–12, 2012–13, 2013–14, 2014–15, 2015–16, 2016–17
- (Nigeria) Olumide Oyedeji ~ Beijing Ducks 2003–04, 2004–05, 2007–08, Shanxi Brave Dragons 2008–09, Liaoning Dinosaurs 2009–10, Qingdao Eagles 2011–12
- (Puerto Rico) Peter John Ramos ~ Guangsha Lions 2009–10, 2010–11, 2011–12, 2012–13, Qingdao Eagles 2013–14, Jilin Northeast Tigers 2015–16
- (United States) Shavlik Randolph ~ Dongguan Leopards 2011–12, Foshan Dralions 2012–13, 2013–14, Liaoning Flying Leopards 2015–16, 2016–17, Beikong Fly Dragons 2017–18, 2018–19
- (Palestine) Sani Sakakini ~ Qingdao Eagles 2011–12, 2013–14, Tongxi Monkey Kings 2015–16, Tianjin Gold Lions 2016–17, Guangzhou Long-Lions 2017–18, Beikong Royal Fighters 2019–20
- (Mali) Soumaila Samake ~ Zhejiang Cyclones 2004–05, 2005–06, 2006–07, 2007–08, Jilin Northeast Tigers 2008–09, 2009–10
- (United States) God Shammgod ~ Zhejiang Cyclones 2001–02, 2002–03, 2003–04, 2004–05, Shanxi Brave Dragons 2006–07
- (United States) Von Wafer ~ Xinjiang Flying Tigers 2012–13, Shanghai Sharks 2013–14, Shanxi Brave Dragons 2014–15, Tongxi Monkey Kings 2015–16, Jilin Northeast Tigers 2017–18
- (United States) Jameel Watkins ~ Fujian Xunxing 2007–08, Jiangsu Dragons 2008–09, 2009–10, Jilin Northeast Tigers 2010–11, 2011–12
- (United States) Rodney White ~ Guangsha Lions 2007–08, 2008–09, 2009–10, Shandong Gold Lions 2010–11, Guangsha Lions 2011–12
- (United States) Marcus E. Williams ~ Zhejiang Golden Bulls 2009–10, 2010–11, Shanxi Brave Dragons 2011–12, 2012–13, 2013–14, Jilin Northeast Tigers 2015–16

=== Non-Chinese players who spent 2 to 4 seasons in the CBA ===
Scroll down to view more names

- (United States) George Ackles ~ Shanghai Sharks 2000–01, Beijing Ducks 2001–02
- (United States) (Bulgaria) Darius Adams ~ Xinjiang Flying Tigers 2016–17, 2017–18, 2018–19, Qingdao Eagles 2019–20
- (United States) Myron Allen ~ Xinjiang Flying Tigers 2008–09, 2009–10, Shandong Gold Lions 2010–11
- (United States) Gilbert Arenas ~ Shanghai Sharks 2012–13, 2013–14
- (Iran) Samad Nikkhah Bahrami ~ Fujian Sturgeons 2013–14, Zhejiang Golden Bulls 2015–16, Guangzhou Long-Lions 2016–17, Nanjing Monkey Kings 2017–18
- (United States) Brandon Bass ~ Liaoning Flying Leopards 2017–18, 2018–19, 2019–20
- (Uruguay) Esteban Batista ~ Beikong Fly Dragons 2015–16, 2016–17
- (United States) Michael Beasley ~ Shanghai Sharks 2014–15, Shandong Golden Stars 2015–16, Guangdong Southern Tigers 2018–19
- (United States) Jerrelle Benimon ~ Foshan Long-Lions 2015–16, Qingdao Eagles 2016–17
- (United States) Josh Boone ~ Zhejiang Golden Bulls 2010–11, 2011–12, 2012–13
- (Greece) Ioannis Bourousis ~ Guangsha Lions 2017–18, 2018–19
- (United States) Denzel Bowles ~ Jilin Northeast Tigers 2013–14, 2014–15
- (United States) Bobby Brown ~ Dongguan/Shenzhen Leopards 2013–14, 2014–15, 2015–16, Shanxi Loongs 2018–19
- (United States) Ernest Brown ~ Liaoning Hunters 2004–05, 2006–07
- (United States) Jabari Brown ~ Foshan Long-Lions 2015–16, Jilin Northeast Tigers 2016–17, Jiangsu Dragons 2017–18
- (United States) Lorenzo Brown ~ Zhejiang Golden Bulls 2016–17, Guangzhou Long-Lions 2018–19
- (United States) Will Bynum ~ Guangdong Southern Tigers 2014–15, 2015–16
- (Senegal) Babacar Camara ~ Jilin Northeast Tigers 2005–06, 2006–07
- (United States) (Belize) Alex Carcamo ~ Shenzhen Yikang 2000–01, Guangdong Southern Tigers 2001–02
- (United States) Lorenzo Coleman ~ Xinjiang Flying Tigers 2003–04, 2004–05, 2005–06, 2006–07
- (United States) Peter Cornell ~ Zhejiang Cyclones 2003–04, Guangdong Southern Tigers 2004–05
- (United States) Jordan Crawford ~ Xinjiang Flying Tigers 2014–15, Tianjin Gold Lions 2015–16, Sichuan Blue Whales 2018–19
- (United States) Brandon Crump ~ Shaanxi Kylins 2005–06, 2006–07
- (United States) (Jordan) Osama "Sam" Daghles ~ Jilin Northeast Tigers 2011–12, Tianjin Gold Lions 2012–13, Jilin Northeast Tigers 2013–14
- (Haiti) (Canada) Samuel Dalembert ~ Shanxi Brave Dragons 2015–16, 2016–17
- (United States) Chris Daniels ~ Qingdao Eagles 2012–13, Liaoning Flying Leopards 2013–14, Guangdong Southern Tigers 2014–15
- (United States) Marcus Denmon ~ Zhejiang Golden Bulls 2018–19, 2019–20
- (United States) Justin Dentmon ~ Qingdao Eagles 2014–15, Sichuan Blue Whales 2015–16, Shandong Golden Stars 2016–17
- (United States) Carlos Dixon ~ Jiangsu Dragons 2005–06, 2006–07
- (United States) Quincy Douby ~ Xinjiang Flying Tigers 2010–11, Zhejiang Golden Bulls 2012–13, Shanghai Sharks 2013–14, Tianjin Gold Lions 2014–15
- (United States) (Philippines) Marcus Douthit ~ Foshan Dralions 2011–12, 2012–13
- (United States) (Nigeria) Michael Efevberha ~ Sichuan Blue Whales 2013–14, 2014–15
- (United States) Ed Elisma ~ Shandong Lions 2003–04, Henan Dragons 2004–05
- (United States) LeRon Ellis ~ Beijing Olympians 1999–00, 2001–02
- (United States) Andre Emmett ~ Shandong Gold Lions 2009–10, Fujian Sturgeons 2010–11
- (Lebanon) Rony Fahed ~ Tianjin Gold Lions 2009–10, 2011–12
- (United States) Kay Felder ~ Xinjiang Flying Tigers 2018–19, 2019–20
- (United States) Kyle Fogg ~ Guangzhou Long-Lions 2017–18, 2018–19, Beikong Royal Fighters 2019–20
- (United States) Alton Ford ~ Fujian Sturgeons 2004–05, Xinjiang Flying Tigers 2009–10
- (United States) Ryan Forehan-Kelly ~ Jiangsu Dragons 2004–05, 2007–08, Shanghai Sharks 2011–12
- (United States) Courtney Fortson ~ Guangsha Lions 2016–17, 2017–18, 2018–19, Sichuan Blue Whales 2019–20
- (United States) Jimmer Fredette ~ Shanghai Sharks 2016–17, 2017–18, 2018–19
- (United States) Andrew Goudelock ~ Xinjiang Flying Tigers 2015–16, Shandong Golden Stars 2018–19
- (United States) Terrance Green ~ Guangdong Southern Tigers 2005–06, 2006–07
- (United States) Martin Green-Werscott ~ Jiangsu Dragons 2004–05, 2007–08
- (United States) Marcus Haislip ~ Guangdong Southern Tigers 2010–11, Foshan Dralions 2011–12, Dongguan Leopards 2012–13, Jiangsu Dragons 2013–14
- (United States) Simeon Haley ~ Jiangsu Dragons 2002–03, 2003–04, 2004–05
- (United States) (Croatia) Justin Hamilton ~ Beijing Ducks 2017–18, 2018–19, 2019–20
- (United States) Tyler Hansbrough ~ Guangzhou Long-Lions 2017–18, Zhejiang Golden Bulls 2018–19, Sichuan Blue Whales 2019–20
- (United States) David Harrison ~ Beijing Ducks 2008–09, Guangdong Southern Tigers 2009–10, 2010–11, Tianjin Gold Lions 2011–12
- (United States) Stephen Hart ~ Shanghai Sharks 2001–02, Jiangsu Dragons 2002–03
- (United States) Chris Herren ~ Beijing Ducks 2002–03, Jiangsu Dragons 2003–04
- (United States) J.J. Hickson ~ Fujian Sturgeons 2016–17, Nanjing Monkey Kings 2017–18
- (United States) James Hodges ~ Liaoning Hunters 1996–97, Jiangsu Dragons 1997–98, Liaoning Hunters 1998–99, 1999–00
- (United States) Othello Hunter ~ Shandong Gold Lions 2011–12, Jiangsu Dragons 2012–13
- (United States) Aaron Jackson ~ Beijing Ducks 2017–18, 2018–19, Guangsha Lions 2019–20
- (United States) Darnell Jackson ~ Xinjiang Flying Tigers 2012–13, Shanghai Sharks 2013–14
- (United States) Pierre Jackson ~ Beikong Fly Dragons 2018–19, Shenzhen Aviators 2019–20
- (United States) Bernard James ~ Shanghai Sharks 2014–15, 2015–16
- (United States) Chris Johnson ~ Guangsha Lions 2013–14, Zhejiang Golden Bulls 2014–15
- (United States) Dakari Johnson ~ Qingdao Eagles 2018–19, 2019–20
- (United States) Ivan Johnson ~ Qingdao Eagles 2011–12, Zhejiang Golden Bulls 2013–14
- (United States) Dwayne Jones ~ Fujian Sturgeons 2010–11, Guangsha Lions 2011–12
- (Dominica) Garth Joseph ~ Shaanxi Kylins 2001–02, 2002–03, 2003–04, 2004–05
- (Iran) Mehdi Kamrani ~ Tongxi Monkey Kings 2014–15, Beikong Fly Dragons 2015–16, Jilin Northeast Tigers 2016–17
- (Lebanon) Fadi El Khatib ~ Foshan Long-Lions 2014–15, Fujian Sturgeons 2015–16
- (Poland) (Sweden) Maciej Lampe ~ Shenzhen Leopards 2016–17, Qingdao Eagles 2017–18, Jilin Northeast Tigers 2018–19
- (United States) Ty Lawson ~ Shandong Golden Stars 2017–18, 2018–19, Fujian Sturgeons 2019–20
- (United States) Justin Love ~ Beijing Olympians 2002–03, 2003–04
- (United States) John Lucas III ~ Shanghai Sharks 2009–10, 2010–11, Fujian Sturgeons 2014–15
- (Syria) Michael Madanly ~ Foshan Dralions 2011–12, 2012–13, Qingdao Eagles 2013–14, Jilin Northeast Tigers 2014–15
- (United States) (Central African Republic) James Mays ~ Beijing Ducks 2009–10, Qingdao Eagles 2017–18, Shandong Heroes 2019–20
- (United States) Jelani McCoy ~ Jiangsu Dragons 2004–05, Guangsha Lions 2008–09, Fujian Xunxing 2009–10
- (United States) Errick McCollum ~ Zhejiang Golden Bulls 2014–15, Beikong Fly Dragons 2016–17
- (United States) Nick Minnerath ~ Shanghai Sharks 2017–18, Xinjiang Flying Tigers 2018–19
- (United States) (Nigeria) Gabe Muoneke ~ Beijing Olympians 2003–04, Guangsha Lions 2006–07, Yunnan Bulls 2008–09
- (Lithuania) Donatas Motiejūnas ~ Shandong Golden Stars 2017–18, 2018–19, Shanghai Sharks 2019–20
- (United States) Shabazz Muhammad ~ Shanxi Loongs 2018–19, Shenzhen Aviators 2019–20
- (United States) Lamond Murray ~ Guangdong Southern Tigers 2006–07, 2007–08, 2008–09
- (United States) Anthony Myles ~ Dongguan Leopards 2005–06, 2006–07
- (Senegal) Hamady N'Diaye ~ Foshan Dralions 2011–12, Tianjin Gold Lions 2012–13
- (Canada) Andrew Nicholson ~ Guangdong Southern Tigers 2017–18, Fujian Sturgeons 2018–19, Guangzhou Loong-Lions 2019–20
- (United States) (Nigeria) Reggie Okosa ~ Shanghai Sharks 2005–06, 2006–07, Qingdao Eagles 2009–10, Xinjiang Flying Tigers 2013–14
- (United States) Jeremy Pargo ~ Guangsha Lions 2015–16, Shenzhen Leopards 2016–17, Nanjing Monkey Kings 2017–18
- (United States) Smush Parker ~ Guangdong Southern Tigers 2008–09, 2009–10
- (United States) Tim Pickett ~ Shanxi Brave Dragons 2008–09, Shaanxi Kylins 2009–10, Jilin Northeast Tigers 2010–11, Xinjiang Flying Tigers 2011–12
- (United States) Chris Porter ~ Fujian Xunxing 2005–06, 2006–07
- (United States) Josh Powell ~ Liaoning Flying Leopards 2011–12, Guangdong Southern Tigers 2013–14
- (United States) A.J. Price ~ Shanghai Sharks 2015–16, Shandong Golden Stars 2016–17
- (United States) Laron Profit ~ Guangdong Southern Tigers 2002–03, 2003–04
- (Serbia) Miroslav Raduljica ~ Shandong Gold Lions 2014–15, Jiangsu Dragons 2017–18, 2018–19, 2019–20
- (United States) Andre Reid ~ Liaoning Hunters 1998–99, 2000–01, 2001–02
- (United States) Kit Rhymer ~ Henan Dragons 2005–06, Fujian Xunxing 2006–07
- (United States) Thomas Robinson ~ Beikong Fly Dragons 2018–19, Sichuan Blue Whales 2019–20
- (United States) Leon Rodgers ~ Jilin Northeast Tigers 2008–09, 2009–10, Shanxi Brave Dragons 2010–11, Jilin Northeast Tigers 2013–14
- (United States) Alex Scales ~ Jiangsu Dragons 2002–03, Shanghai Sharks 2004–05
- (Argentina) Luis Scola ~ Shanxi Brave Dragons 2017–18, Shanghai Sharks 2018–19
- (United States) Shawnelle Scott ~ Jiangsu Dragons 2003–04, Jilin Northeast Tigers 2004–05
- (United States) Garret Siler ~ Shanghai Sharks 2009–10, Jiangsu Dragons 2012–13
- (United States) James Singleton ~ Xinjiang Flying Tigers 2010–11, Guangdong Southern Tigers 2011–12, Xinjiang Flying Tigers 2012–13, 2013–14
- (United States) Donald Sloan ~ Guangdong Southern Tigers 2012–13, 2016–17, 2017–18, Jiangsu Dragons 2018–19
- (United States) Russ Smith ~ Fujian Sturgeons 2017–18, 2018–19
- (United States) Dewarick Spencer ~ Jilin Northeast Tigers 2012–13, Zhejiang Golden Bulls 2013–14
- (United States) John Spencer ~ Jiangsu Dragons 1996–97, Sichuan Pandas 1997–98
- (United States) Jarnell Stokes ~ Zhejiang Golden Bulls 2017–18, Xinjiang Flying Tigers 2018–19, 2019–20
- (United States) Mark Strickland ~ Zhejiang Cyclones 2002–03, 2003–04
- (Canada) Damon Stringer ~ Shanghai Sharks 2000–01, Shaanxi Kylins 2001–02
- (United States) Jared Sullinger ~ Shenzhen Leopards 2017–18, 2018–19
- (United States) Roy Tarpley ~ Beijing Olympians 2000–01, 2001–02
- (United States) Dajuan Tate ~ Fujian Xunxing 2007–08, Shanghai Sharks 2008–09, Dongguan Leopards 2009–10
- (United States) Sebastian Telfair ~ Tianjin Gold Lions 2013–14, Xinjiang Flying Tigers 2014–15, Fujian Sturgeons 2016–17
- (United States) Malcolm Thomas ~ Jilin Northeast Tigers 2016–17, Shanxi Loongs 2019–20
- (United States) Jason Thompson ~ Shandong Golden Stars 2016–17, Sichuan Blue Whales 2018–19, Beikong Royal Fighters 2019–20
- (United States) Mack Tuck ~ Shandong Gold Lions 2004–05, 2006–07, 2007–08, 2008–09
- (United States) Jeremy Tyler ~ Shanxi Brave Dragons 2014–15, Fujian Sturgeons 2015–16, Tianjin Gold Lions 2016–17
- (United States) (Lebanon) Jackson Vroman ~ Dongguan Leopards 2010–11, Jiangsu Dragons 2011–12, Shandong Gold Lions 2012–13, Jiangsu Dragons 2013–14
- (United States) Willie Warren ~ Chongqing Fly Dragons 2014–15, Zhejiang Golden Bulls 2015–16, 2016–17, Shanxi Brave Dragons 2017–18
- (United States) Sonny Weems ~ Zhejiang Golden Bulls 2017–18, Guangdong Southern Tigers 2018–19, 2019–20
- (United States) Delonte West ~ Fujian Sturgeons 2013–14, Shanghai Sharks 2014–15
- (United States) D.J. White ~ Shanghai Sharks 2012–13, Sichuan Blue Whales 2013–14, Fujian Sturgeons 2014–15
- (United States) Shelden Williams ~ Tianjin Gold Lions 2013–14, 2014–15
- (France) Guerschon Yabusele ~ Shanghai Sharks 2016–17, Nanjing Monkey Kings 2019–20
- (United States) Joe Young ~ Nanjing Monkey Kings 2018–19, 2019–20

=== Non-Chinese players for whom 2019–20 is their 1st season in the CBA ===
Scroll down to view more names

- (United States) Antonio Blakeney ~ Jiangsu Dragons 2019–20
- (United States) Dante Cunningham ~ Fujian Sturgeons 2019–20
- (United States) Kenneth Faried ~ Guangsha Lions 2019–20
- (United States) Marcus Georges-Hunt ~ Guangzhou Loong-Lions 2019–20
- (United States) Erick Green ~ Fujian Sturgeons 2019–20
- (United States) (Austria) Sylven Landesberg ~ Zhejiang Golden Bulls 2019–20
- (United States) (Chinese Taipei) Jeremy Lin ~ Beijing Ducks 2019–20
- (United States) Jarell Martin ~ Shenzhen Aviators 2019–20
- (United States) Ray McCallum Jr. ~ Shanghai Sharks 2019–20
- (United States) Eric Mika ~ Xinjiang Flying Tigers 2019–20
- (United States) Eric Moreland ~ Shanxi Loongs 2019–20
- (United States) James Nunnally ~ Shanghai Sharks 2019–20
- (United States) Miles Plumlee ~ Guangsha Lions 2019–20
- (United States) Chasson Randle ~ Tianjin Pioneers 2019–20
- (United States) Jalen Reynolds ~ Guangsha Lions 2019–20
- (United States) Lance Stephenson ~ Liaoning Flying Leopards 2019–20
- (United States) (Israel) Amar'e Stoudemire ~ Fujian Sturgeons 2019–20
- (United States) Keifer Sykes ~ Guangzhou Loong-Lions 2019–20
- (Montenegro) Marko Todorovic ~ Tianjin Pioneers 2019–20
- (Nigeria) Ekpe Udoh ~ Beijing Ducks 2019–20
- (United States) Dez Wells ~ Guangsha Lions 2019–20
- (Iran) Behnam Yakhchali ~ Nanjing Monkey Kings 2019–20

=== Other Non-Chinese players who spent only 1 season in the CBA ===
Scroll down to view more names.

- (United States) Josh Adams ~ Shanxi Loongs 2018–19
- (United States) Jeff Adrien ~ Guangdong Southern Tigers 2014–15
- (United States) Cole Aldrich ~ Tianjin Gold Lions 2018–19
- (United States) Alan Anderson ~ Shandong Gold Lions 2011–12
- (Lebanon) Wael Arakji ~ Beikong Fly Dragons 2017–18
- (United States) Isaiah Austin ~ Nanjing Monkey Kings 2018–19
- (United States) Corey Benjamin ~ Xinjiang Flying Tigers 2004–05
- (United States) David Benoit ~ Shanghai Sharks 2001–02
- (Ghana) Ben Bentil ~ Xinjiang Flying Tigers 2016–17
- (United States) DeJuan Blair ~ Tongxi Monkey Kings 2016–17
- (United States) Ryan Boatright ~ Guangzhou Long-Lions 2016–17
- (United States) Carlos Boozer ~ Guangdong Southern Tigers 2016–17
- (United States) Kenny Boynton ~ Shenzhen Leopards 2018–19
- (United States) Aaron Brooks ~ Guangdong Southern Tigers 2011–12
- (United States) Andre Brown ~ Zhejiang Golden Bulls 2009–10
- (United States) Dee Brown ~ Qingdao Eagles 2010–11
- (United States) Rodney Carney ~ Liaoning Flying Leopards 2011–12
- (United States) Justin Carter ~ Guangdong Southern Tigers 2015–16
- (United States) Wilson Chandler ~ Guangsha Lions 2011–12
- (United States) Semaj Christon ~ Guangzhou Long-Lions 2017–18
- (United States) Earl Clark ~ Shandong Golden Stars 2014–15
- (United States) Keith Closs ~ Yunnan Bulls 2008–09
- (United States) Norris Cole ~ Shandong Golden Stars 2016–17
- (United States) Mardy Collins ~ Jiangsu Dragons 2011–12
- (United States) Brandon Costner ~ Tongxi Monkey Kings 2014–15
- (United States) Bryce Cotton ~ Xinjiang Flying Tigers 2015–16
- (United States) Jared Cunningham ~ Tongxi Monkey Kings 2016–17
- (United States) Eddy Curry ~ Zhejiang Golden Bulls 2012–13
- (United States) Ricky Davis ~ Jiangsu Dragons 2010–11
- (United States) Malcolm Delaney ~ Guangdong Southern Tigers 2018–19
- (United States) Toney Douglas ~ Jiangsu Dragons 2014–15
- (United States) Jerome Dyson ~ Jiangsu Dragons 2018–19
- (United States) Jarrid Famous ~ Fujian Sturgeons 2015–16
- (United States) Gerald Fitch ~ Foshan Dralions 2013–14
- (Panama) Gary Forbes ~ Guangsha Lions 2012–13
- (United States) Steve Francis ~ Beijing Ducks 2010–11
- (Netherlands) Dan Gadzuric ~ Jiangsu Dragons 2011–12
- (United States) Sundiata Gaines ~ Fujian Sturgeons 2012–13
- (United States) Yancy Gates ~ Shanxi Brave Dragons 2015–16
- (United States) Archie Goodwin ~ Zhejiang Golden Bulls 2018–19
- (United States) Gerald Green ~ Foshan Dralions 2011–12
- (United States) Donté Greene ~ Dongguan Leopards 2013–14
- (United States) Al Harrington ~ Fujian Sturgeons 2014–15
- (United States) Scotty Hopson ~ Foshan Long-Lions 2015–16
- (United States) Royal Ivey ~ Guangdong Southern Tigers 2013–14
- (France) Edwin Jackson ~ Guangdong Southern Tigers 2017–18
- (United States) Al Jefferson ~ Xinjiang Flying Tigers 2018–19
- (United States) Cory Jefferson ~ Guangzhou Long-Lions 2018–19
- (United States) Brandon Jennings ~ Shanxi Brave Dragons 2017–18
- (United States) Grant Jerrett ~ Beijing Ducks 2016–17
- (United States) DerMarr Johnson ~ Jiangsu Dragons 2009–10
- (United States) Solomon Jones ~ Liaoning Flying Leopards 2012–13
- (United States) Terrence Jones ~ Qingdao Eagles 2017–18
- (Jamaica) Jerome Jordan ~ Tongxi Monkey Kings 2015–16
- (Iran) Arsalan Kazemi ~ Chongqing Fly Dragons 2014–15
- (United States) D.J. Kennedy ~ Guangzhou Long-Lions 2016–17
- (United States) Alex Kirk ~ Guangzhou Long-Lions 2016–17
- (Ukraine) Viacheslav Kravtsov ~ Foshan Long-Lions 2014–15
- (Haiti) Cady Lalanne ~ Zhejiang Golden Bulls 2016–17
- (United States) Carl Landry ~ Jilin Northeast Tigers 2017–18
- (United States) Keith Langford ~ Shenzhen Leopards 2017–18
- (United States) (Bulgaria) Priest Lauderdale ~ Shandong Gold Lions 2008–09
- (United States) (Nigeria) Gani Lawal ~ Xinjiang Flying Tigers 2011–12
- (United States) Ricky Ledo ~ Beikong Fly Dragons 2018–19
- (Brazil) (Spain) Augusto Lima ~ Xinjiang Flying Tigers 2017–18
- (United States) Shawn Long ~ Xinjiang Flying Tigers 2017–18
- (United States) Cartier Martin ~ Jilin Northeast Tigers 2011–12
- (United States) Kenyon Martin ~ Xinjiang Flying Tigers 2011–12
- (Greece) Loukas Mavrokefalidis ~ Qingdao Eagles 2016–17
- (United States) Jason Maxiell ~ Tianjin Gold Lions 2015–16
- (United States) Chris McCullough ~ Shanxi Loongs 2018–19
- (United States) Tracy McGrady ~ Qingdao Eagles 2012–13
- (United States) Dominic McGuire ~ Shenzhen Leopards 2015–16
- (United States) Jerel McNeal ~ Zhejiang Golden Bulls 2013–14
- (Australia) Patty Mills ~ Xinjiang Flying Tigers 2011–12
- (France) Jérôme Moïso ~ Jiangsu Dragons 2010–11
- (United States) J'mison Morgan ~ Chongqing Fly Dragons 2014–15
- (Canada) Liam McMorrow ~ Tongxi Monkey Kings 2015–16
- (United States) Darius Morris ~ Guangdong Southern Tigers 2017–18
- (United States) Arnett Moultrie ~ Jiangsu Dragons 2014–15
- (Democratic Republic of the Congo) (United States) Emmanuel Mudiay ~ Guangdong Southern Tigers 2014–15
- (United States) Xavier Munford ~ Fujian Sturgeons 2018–19
- (United States) Kevin Murphy ~ Guangsha Lions 2014–15
- (United States) Greg Oden ~ Jiangsu Dragons 2015–16
- (United States) Daniel Orton ~ Sichuan Blue Whales 2014–15
- (United States) Arinze Onuaku ~ Zhejiang Golden Bulls 2017–18
- (United States) Brandon Paul ~ Zhejiang Golden Bulls 2018–19
- (United States) Adreian Payne ~ Nanjing Monkey Kings 2018–19
- (United States) Doron Perkins ~ Foshan Dralions 2012–13
- (Palestine) Imad Qahwash ~ Jiangsu Dragons 2012–13
- (United States) (Montenegro) Tyrese Rice ~ Shenzhen Leopards 2017–18
- (United States) Anthony Roberson ~ Fujian Sturgeons 2011–12
- (United States) (Montenegro) (Israel) Taylor Rochestie ~ Tianjin Gold Lions 2018–19
- (United States) JaKarr Sampson ~ Shandong Golden Stars 2018–19
- (Jamaica) Samardo Samuels ~ Jiangsu Dragons 2016–17
- (United States) Henry Sims ~ Shanxi Brave Dragons 2016–17
- (United States) Josh Smith ~ Sichuan Blue Whales 2016–17
- (United States) J.R. Smith ~ Zhejiang Golden Bulls 2011–12
- (United States) Marreese Speights ~ Guangzhou Long-Lions 2018–19
- (United States) Alex Stepheson ~ Guangzhou Long-Lions 2016–17
- (Lithuania) Saulius Štombergas ~ Shanghai Sharks 1996–97
- (United States) Stromile Swift ~ Shandong Gold Lions 2009–10
- (United States) Maurice Taylor ~ Shanxi Brave Dragons 2009–10
- (United States) Lance Thomas ~ Foshan Dralions 2013–14
- (United States) Deon Thompson ~ Liaoning Flying Leopards 2014–15
- (United States) Marcus Thornton ~ Beijing Ducks 2017–18
- (United States) David Vanterpool ~ Jilin Northeast Tigers 1998–99
- (United States) Casper Ware ~ Tianjin Gold Lions 2015–16
- (United States) Hakim Warrick ~ Liaoning Flying Leopards 2013–14
- (United States) Bonzi Wells ~ Shanxi Brave Dragons 2008–09
- (United States) Damien Wilkins ~ Beijing Ducks 2013–14
- (United States) Alan Williams ~ Qingdao Eagles 2015–16
- (United States) Marcus D. Williams ~ Jiangsu Dragons 2011–12
- (United States) Derrick Williams ~ Tianjin Gold Lions 2017–18
- (United States) Metta World Peace (known in China as The Panda's Friend) ~ Sichuan Blue Whales 2014–15
- (United States) Dorell Wright ~ Beikong Fly Dragons 2015–16
- (United States) Khalif Wyatt ~ Guangdong Southern Tigers 2013–14

== Politics ==
On October 4, 2019, the Houston Rockets general manager Daryl Morey issued a tweet in support of the 2019–20 Hong Kong protests. Morey's tweet resulted in the Chinese Basketball Association's suspension of its relationship with the Houston Rockets and China Central Television's removal of all NBA games from its broadcast schedule until further notice.

== See also ==
- Basketball in China
- CBA All-Star Game (China)
- China men's national basketball team
- China women's national basketball team
- National Basketball League (NBL)
- Women's Chinese Basketball Association (WCBA)
- Chinese University Basketball Association (CUBA)
