= Li Chunjiang =

Chinese basketball player and coach

Li Chunjiang 李春江
Personal information
- Born: 11 March 1963 (age 63) Shenyang, Liaoning, China
- Listed height: 6 ft 3 in (1.91 m)
- Listed weight: 187 lb (85 kg)

Career information
- Playing career: 1977–1998
- Position: Small Forward
- Coaching career: 2001–present

Career history

Playing
- 1983-1993: Liaoning Flying Leopards
- 1993-1998: Guangdong Southern Tigers

Coaching
- 2001–2013: Guangdong Southern Tigers
- 2013–2020: Zhejiang Lions
- 2021–2023: Shanghai Sharks

Career highlights
- As player: 1990 Asian Games champion; 1991 ABC Championship champion; As head coach: 7× CBA champion (2004, 2005, 2006, 2008, 2009, 2010, 2011); 8× CBA All-Star Game Head Coach (2003, 2006, 2008, 2009, 2010, 2011, 2012, 2018)
Medals
Men's adult basketball
Representing China
FIBA Asia Cup
| Gold medal – first place | 1989 Beijing |
| Gold medal – first place | 1991 Kobe |
Asian Games
| Gold medal – first place | 1990 Beijing |
Representing Guangdong Province
National Games of China
| Silver medal – second place | 2005 Jiangsu |
| Gold medal – first place | 2009 Shandong |

Li Chunjiang (born 11 March 1963) is a Chinese basketball coach and former player. He was the member of national team and won titles at 1990 Asian Games and the 1991 ABC Championship. In the following year, Li along with the national team competed in the men's tournament at the 1992 Summer Olympics in Barcelona. Three years after announcing his retirement from professional basketball in 1998, he has since launched a distinguished coaching career. He received a five-year coaching ban in 2023 as a result of his involvement in alleged match-fixing during the 2023 CBA playoffs.

== Early life ==
Li was born on 11 March 1963 in Shenyang, the capital of Liaoning province in Northeast China. He began his basketball career in 1977 when entered Liaoning Sports School for training. He subsequently entered the Liaoning Youth Yeam at the age of 17. He was then selected into the national youth team in 1982 and the Liaoning team in 1983, where he became the small forward. Because there was no professional league before 1995, the players retired relatively early. Li Chunjiang himself was forced to retire from Liaoning in 1993 and worked in the real estate bureau of Huanggu District, Shenyang. At this time, Li resolutely gave up his working and went south to join Guangdong Hongyuan, where he played his second spring of career.

== Coaching career ==
=== Dormancy period (2001–2002) ===
In the first year of Li Chunjiang's coaching, the team has suffered a rare five consecutive losses, which is undoubtedly a big blow for Li. The final result of Guangdong Southern Tigers in the regular season was 12–10, and the first round of the playoffs was out. In the subsequent competition of the 9th National Games in 2001, as the host, the original goal was to enter the top three Guangdong men's basketball team, and finally only won the fourth place. In the 2001–02 season, Hongyuan finished seventh in the regular season, and was swept by the Shanghai Sharks with Yao Ming in Playoffs.

=== Rising period (2002–2006) ===
In 2002–03 season, Guangdong Southern Tigers entered the stage of blowout. In the regular season, he entered the playoffs with 23–3–no.1, but lost the championship in the finals. In the 2003–04 season, Guangdong finally won the championship by defeating the old opponent Bayi in the finals. Li Chunjiang stood at the top of the CBA stage and opened the prelude of Hongyuan Dynasty.

In the 2004–05 season finals against Jiangsu, Guangdong was 1–2 behind in the first three games, especially Nanjing in the fifth game. They miraculously turned back the defeat to win the championship after 16 points in the fourth quarter. Li Chunjiang's on-the-spot command ability at critical moments is admirable. In the 2005–06 season, Guangdong won 4–1 in the finals over the old opponent Bayi Rockets, ushering in the team's first three consecutive titles. At the same time, Yi Jianlian decided to participate in the 2007 NBA draft.

=== Charging period (2006–2007) ===
In 2006, Li handed his position of head coach to Assistant coach Li Qun and traveled alone to the United States for further athletic study. Li Chunjiang's study abroad was not gilded, but he watched the game video day and night; he drove around the west coast of the United States alone, traveling among Seattle SuperSonics, Portland Trail Blazers and Sacramento Kings; he watched the NCAA at Oregon State University and Oregon University and asked the university coaches for advice.

=== Brilliant period (2008–2011) ===
At the beginning of the 2007–08 season, Li Chunjiang returned to the position of head coach of Guangdong Southern Tigers. From the 2007–08 season, Guangdong began to rule the CBA for four years. They defeated Liaoning Flying Leopards (4–1), beat Xinjiang Flying Tigers (4–1, 4–1, 4–2) three times in a row, and won four consecutive titles, which opened the Guangdong Dynasty. At the 2008 Summer Olympics in Beijing, five trainees of Li Chunjiang were represented in the Chinese men's basketball team. In the 11th National Games of China, Guangdong men's basketball team successively defeated Shandong, which won the titles of the National Games. Coach Li also became the most successful basketball coach in China.

=== New challenges (2013–2023) ===
After being eliminated by Beijing, which was led by Stephon Marbury, Li Chunjiang chose to resign. A few months later, Li Chunjiang took over Zhejiang Lions and led the team to the 2018 CBA Finals and finished as runner-up. In November, 18-year-old Li Jinglong, son of Coach Li, also made his CBA debut with 2 points and one rebound in nine minutes.

=== Coach Ban (2023) ===
In the first round of 2023 CBA playoffs, Li Chunjiang's Shanghai Sharks won a 3-game series against Jiangsu Dragons by 119-95, 90-97 and 108-104. In the last two minutes of the 3rd game, the Dragons committed 5 turnovers without calling any timeout, meanwhile the Sharks went on a 10-0 run and won. After post-game investigation by CBA, the latter 2 games were judged as "being negative in competition". As the result, Li Chunjiang was banned from coaching for 5 years and both teams were removed from playoffs. Li Chunjiang was then sacked by Shanghai Sharks.

== Reality shows ==
| Year | Title | Chinese title | Note | Ref. |
|---|---|---|---|---|
| 2019 | Super Penguin League; Season:2 | 超级企鹅联盟 Super3 | Coach; Live Basketball Competition | |
