= Jinqiang International Event Center =

Sports venue in Chengdu, China

The Jinqiang International Event Center (Chinese: 金强国际赛事中心) is a 15,000-seat multi-purpose arena in Chengdu, Sichuan, China. It is the new home of the Sichuan Blue Whales of the Chinese Basketball Association. The arena opened in 2023 and is considered one of China's most modern and well-equipped arenas.

The total construction area of the Jinqiang International Event Center is approximately 200,000 square meters. It consists of a large first-class stadium that can accommodate 15,000 people, a commercial center, and supporting facilities.

The Jinqiang International Event Center is designed to resemble a swimming blue whale, which is the mascot of the Sichuan Blue Whales. The exterior of the arena is modern and sleek, featuring a unique blue whale design inspired by the Yuyu civilization of Wenjiang, the birthplace of the ancient Shu Kingdom. The texture on the outside of the venue symbolizes the civilization's rich history and cultural heritage.
