= Wu Naiqun =

Chinese basketball player

Wu Naiqun 吴乃群
Personal information
- Born: February 4, 1971 (age 55) Shenyang, Liaoning, China
- Listed height: 2.02 m (6 ft 8 in)

Career information
- Playing career: 1989–2007

Career history

Playing
- 1989–2000: Liaoning Flying Leopards
- 2000–2007: Zhejiang Wanma

Coaching
- 2020–2023: Liaoning Flying Leopards (assistant)
- 2024–present: Liaoning Flying Leopards (assistant)
Medals
Men's basketball
Representing China
FIBA Asia Cup
Gold medal – first place	1995 Seoul
Bronze medal – third place	1997 Riyadh
Asian Games
Gold medal – first place	1994 Hiroshima
Universiade Games
Bronze medal – third place	1993 Buffalo
FIBA Under-18 Asia Championship
Bronze medal – third place	1990 Nagoya

Wu Naiqun (born 4 February 1971) is a former Chinese basketball player who competed in the 1996 Summer Olympics.
