= Han Dejun =

Chinese basketball player (born 1987)

Han Dejun 韩德君
Personal information
- Born: 10 May 1987 (age 39) Panjin, Liaoning, China
- Listed height: 7 ft 1 in (2.16 m)
- Listed weight: 320 lb (145 kg)

Career information
- Playing career: 2008–2025
- Position: Center

Career history
- 2007–2025: Liaoning Flying Leopards

Career highlights
- 4× CBA champion (2018, 2022, 2023, 2024)

Han Dejun (Chinese: 韩德君; pinyin: Hán Déjūn; born 10 May 1987) is a Chinese former professional basketball player who played his entire career with the Liaoning Flying Leopards.

== Professional career ==
Han Dejun signed his first professional contract with Chinese Basketball Association side Liaoning Flying Leopards and was used sparingly in his debut season, averaging 4.1 points and 2.8 rebounds per game. He would see a steady increase of playing time throughout the next couple of seasons an averaged 13.1 points per game and 7.7 rebounds per game in the 2011–12 season. Prior to the beginning of the 2012–13 season, there was speculation that Han was set to leave Liaoning to join the Beijing Ducks. Both Liaoning and Beijing denied these claims and in the end, Han signed a two-year contract extension with his team. On 2 December 2012, Han scored 15 points in a win over the Tianjin Golden Lions. He then proceeded to score 23 points while grabbing 9 rebounds in a road loss to the Shandong Lions.

On 1 September 2025, Han announced his retirement of professional basketball.

== National team career ==
In May 2010, Han was selected to participate as a preliminary squad member for the China national team. In 2012, Han was once again selected to participate as a preliminary squad member.

Five years later, Han represented China at the 2017 FIBA Asia Cup, where he completed the tournament averaging 10.4 points and 5.7 rebounds per game. During China's 2019 FIBA World Cup qualifying campaign, Han averaged 9.5 points and 3.8 rebounds in his four games. On 27 November 2021, Han played in his only game during the 2023 FIBA World Cup qualifying campaign.

== Career statistics ==
=== CBA statistics ===
Year	Team	GP	RPG	APG	FG%	FT%	PPG
2008–09	Liaoning	31	2.8	0.1	.547	.561	4.1
2009–10	Liaoning	34	5.2	0.3	.608	.750	8.1
2010–11	Liaoning	32	5.8	0.4	.590	.658	11.8
2011–12	Liaoning	32	7.5	0.6	.589	.710	12.9
2012–13	Liaoning	14	6.9	1.0	.553	.804	11.1
2013–14	Liaoning	27	8.3	0.7	.581	.707	14.9
2014–15	Liaoning	49	7.6	1.0	.590	.737	14.6
