= 2022–23 Chinese Basketball Association season =

2022–23 CBA season
- League: Chinese Basketball Association
- Sport: Basketball
- Teams: 20

Regular season
- Season MVP: Wang Zhelin (Shanghai Sharks); Dominique Jones (Jilin Northeast Tigers)
- Top scorer: Antonio Blakeney (Jiangsu Dragons)

Playoffs
- Finals champions: Liaoning Flying Leopards
- Runners-up: Zhejiang Golden Bulls
- Finals MVP: Zhao Jiwei (Liaoning Flying Leopards)

Seasons
- ← 2021–22 2023–24 →

The 2022–23 CBA season was the 28th season of the Chinese Basketball Association (CBA). The season began on 21 October 2022 and ended on 5 April 2023.

The league consisted of 20 teams. The Liaoning Flying Leopards won their third championship in team history following their finals victory over the Zhejiang Golden Bulls.

On 17 April 2023, during the playoffs, the CBA ruled that the Jiangsu Dragons and Shanghai Sharks engaged in unsportsmanlike conduct following point shaving incidents, and were suspended for the next season. Coaches and players were given multiyear suspensions as well.

On 15 January 2026, the United States Department of Justice Eastern District of Pennsylvania announced the indictment of Dragons player Antonio Blakeney as one of 26 parties involved in the match-fixing and point shaving scheme, which started in October 2022 in the CBA and eventually advanced into the United States National Collegiate Athletic Association for two subsequent season (2023-24 and 2024-25 seasons). Two of the 26 parties involved, Marves Fairley and Shane Hennen, were previously indicted three months prior on 23 October 2025 in the Eastern District of New York for their role in the 2023 NBA gambling scheme that involved Terry Rozier, Damon Jones, and Chauncey Billups, all of whom were indicted in that scheme. Fairley and Hennen recruited Blakeney for the entirety of the CBA/NCAA gambling ring, and Blakeney recruited numerous CBA players for the corrupted matches. The Department of Justice report cited gambler Jalen Smith, also part of the ring, for making bets of 198,300 USD for the Guandong Southern Tigers to cover an 11.5 point spread against Jiangsu at Rivers Casino Philadelphia (which Guandong won by 31 points), and a 15 March 2023 game against Zhejiang, where bets of over 100,000 USD, including a specific 50,000 USD wager, was placed at the same casino for Zhejiang (favoured by approximately 15 points in various casinos) against Jiangsu, which Zhejiang won by 41 points. The games had been rigged in accordance with the match fixers. At the conclusion of the CBA season, Fairley sent Blakeney a payment of 200,000 USD for participating in the scheme. The charges violated Title 18 of the United States Code, Section 264, the Sports Bribery Act of 1964, with original jurisdiction assigned to the Eastern District of Pennsylvania since the illegal betting scheme took place in Philadelphia.

On 9 March 2026, Jalen Smith plead guilty to the charges he was involved with match fixing and point shaving with the CBA games in response to this charge. Smith also pleaded guilty to one count of possessing a firearm as a felon. He was charged after a May 21, 2025 search of his home found him to be in unlawful possession of a loaded Khar Arms CT380 semi-automatic pistol. Smith was convicted on two counts of possession with intent to distribute in 2018. On 13 October 2026, Smith was sentenced to six years in prison, three years of supervised release, ordered to pay restitution over 1,100,000 USD, and forfeited 75,000 USD, for his involvement in the match fixing scheme.

== Regular season ==
Pos	Team	Pld	W	L	PF	PA	PD	Qualification or relegation
1	Zhejiang Golden Bulls	42	35	7	4412	3782	+630	Advance to playoffs quarter-finals
2	Guangdong Southern Tigers	42	33	9	4324	3874	+450	Advance to playoffs quarter-finals
3	Liaoning Flying Leopards	42	32	10	4067	3550	+517	Advance to playoffs quarter-finals
4	Shenzhen Leopards	42	28	14	4242	4037	+205	Advance to playoffs quarter-finals
5	Shanghai Sharks	42	26	16	4470	4305	+165	Advance to playoffs first round
6	Shougang Beijing Ducks	42	26	16	3878	3613	+265	Advance to playoffs first round
7	Zhejiang Guangsha Lions	42	25	17	4058	3952	+106	Advance to playoffs first round
8	Shandong Hi-Speed Kirin	42	23	19	4250	4058	+192	Advance to playoffs first round
9	Guangzhou Long-Lions	42	22	20	4090	3924	+166	Advance to playoffs first round
10	Shanxi Loongs	42	21	21	4388	4422	−34	Advance to playoffs first round
11	Jilin Northeast Tigers	42	20	22	4045	4214	−169	Advance to playoffs first round
12	Xinjiang Flying Tigers	42	20	22	3396	3513	−117	
13	Jiangsu Nangang Dragons Nanjing	42	19	23	3914	4100	−186	Advance to playoffs first round
14	Qingdao Eagles	42	18	24	3918	3889	+29	
15	Nanjing Tongxi Monkey Kings	42	17	25	4301	4382	−81	
16	Beijing Royal Fighters	42	16	26	3901	4212	−311	
17	Fujian Sturgeons	42	13	29	3826	4305	−479	
18	Sichuan Blue Whales	42	12	30	3836	4140	−304	
19	Tianjin Ronggang Pioneers	42	10	32	4029	4259	−230	
20	Ningbo Rockets	42	4	38	3598	4412	−814	

Source: Asia-basket.com

== Playoffs ==
First round
8	Shandong	0
9	Guangzhou	2
5	~~Shanghai~~	2
13	~~Jiangsu~~	1
7	Guangsha	2
10	Shanxi	0
6	Beijing	2
11	Jilin	0

Quarter-finals
1	Zhejiang	2
9	Guangzhou	0
4	Shenzhen	20 (Note: Forfeit after Shanghai and Jiangsu were disqualified for point shaving. By CBA rule (compliant with FIBA), a forfeit in the first game of a three-game series constitutes an automatic series win with a 20-0 win in the first game.)
5	~~Shanghai~~	0
2	Guangdong	1
7	Guangsha	2
3	Liaoning	2
6	Beijing	0

Semi-finals
1	Zhejiang	3
4	Shenzhen	2
7	Guangsha	2
3	Liaoning	3

Final
1	Zhejiang	0
3	Liaoning	4

NOTE: No. 5 Shanghai defeated No. 12 Jiangsu, 2-1, in the first round but both teams were disqualified for point shaving. No. 4 Shenzhen was awarded a bye, which by FIBA rule constitutes a 20-0 forfeit win in the first game of a 3-game series. On 15 January 2026, the United States Department of Justice indicted Jiangsu player Antonio Blakeney for his participation in point shaving incidents that involved Jiangsu games in the CBA, along with numerous NCAA men's games from 2023 to 2025.

== Awards ==
Category	Player	Team(s)
Domestic MVP	Wang Zhelin	Shanghai Sharks
Foreign MVP	Dominique Jones	Jilin Northeast Tigers
Finals MVP	Zhao Jiwei	Xinjiang Flying Tigers
All-Star Game MVP	Abdusalam Abdurixit	Xinjiang Flying Tigers

== Individual statistics ==
Category	Player	Team(s)	Statistic
Points per game	Antonio Blakeney	Jiangsu Dragons	32.1
Rebounds per game	Jared Sullinger	Shenzhen Leopards	13.9
Assists per game	Dominique Jones	Jilin Northeast Tigers	10.5
Steals per game	Dominique Jones	Jilin Northeast Tigers	2.5
Blocks per game	Tacko Fall	Xinjiang Flying Tigers	3.3
