= Zhao Jiwei =

Chinese basketball player

Zhao Jiwei 赵继伟
No. 3 – Liaoning Flying Leopards
- Position: Point guard / shooting guard
- League: Chinese Basketball Association

Personal information
- Born: August 25, 1995 (age 31) Haicheng, Liaoning, China
- Listed height: 6 ft 1 in (1.85 m)

Career information
- Playing career: 2013–present

Career history
- 2013–present: Liaoning Flying Leopards

Career highlights
- 4× CBA champion (2018, 2022–2024); 2× CBA Finals MVP (2022, 2023)
Medals
Men's basketball
Representing China
FIBA Asia Championship
Gold medal – first place	2015 Changsha
Asian Games
Bronze medal – third place	2022 Hangzhou
FIBA Under-16 Asia Cup
Gold medal – first place	2011 Nha Trang

Zhao Jiwei (Chinese: 赵继伟; Traditional Chinese: 趙繼偉; pinyin: Zhào Jì Wěi; born August 25, 1995) is a Chinese professional basketball player for the Liaoning Flying Leopards of the Chinese Basketball Association.

He represented China's national basketball team at the 2015 FIBA Asia Championship in Changsha, China.

Zhao was included in China's squad for the 2023 FIBA Basketball World Cup qualification.
