= Sichuan Blue Whales =

Basketball team based in Chengdu, China

- Leagues: CBA; The Asian Tournament
- Founded: 2009; 17 years ago
- History: Sichuan Blue Whales (2009–present)
- Arena: Jinqiang International Event Center
- Capacity: 15,000
- Location: Chengdu, Sichuan, China
- Team colors: Blue, white, orange
- Main sponsor: Li Holdings
- President: Li Fuliang
- Vice-president: Li Fufu
- Team manager: Zhu Xuegui
- Head coach: Simon Petrov
- Ownership: Jinqiang Group
- Championships: 1 (2016)
Home	Away

The Sichuan Jinqiang Blue Whales (sometimes spelled Whale) (四川金强蓝鲸), also known as Sichuan Jinqiang or Sichuan Jinrong Industry, are a professional basketball team based in Wenjiang District, Chengdu, Sichuan, China, which plays in the North Division of the Chinese Basketball Association. The Jinqiang Group is the club's corporate sponsor, while its mascot is a blue whale.

In 2016, the team won the CBA Finals in their first appearance in the championship series, defeating the Liaoning Flying Leopards 4–1 in the best of seven series. They became the fifth different club to claim the title in the league's 21 seasons of existence, and the fastest expansion squad to ever do so, winning the title in just their third campaign in the CBA.

== History ==
The team spent the first four years of its existence a member of the higher-tier Chinese National Basketball League, until getting "promoted" ahead of the 2013–14 CBA season, after winning the NBL championship in 2013.

Affectionately referred to by many local fans as the Sichuan Army (川军), the club received international media attention during the 2014–15 CBA season, after signing former NBA All-Star Metta World Peace. Embracing his move to China, the man born as Ron Artest soon gave himself a new name, The Panda's Friend.

The team missed the CBA Playoffs for a second straight year, however, finishing 18th of 20 clubs with a record of 8–30, and despite telling reporters he "had indeed found a bit of inner peace in Sichuan", World Peace headed to Italy after the campaign ended. His departure left the Blue Whales to adopt a different offensive approach for the 2015–16 CBA season.

During the ensuing campaign, Sichuan would reach surprising success by finishing in third place in the regular season standings with a record of 30–8, and earning the third seed in the playoffs. The Blue Whales tied the Xinjiang Flying Tigers for the second-best record in the regular season, and matched up with them in the semi-final round of the playoffs. The team advanced to the 2016 CBA Finals against the Liaoning Flying Leopards after sweeping the Guangsha Lions and the Xinjiang Flying Tigers in the first two rounds of the postseason.

During the Finals, the Blue Whales lost their first game against the top-seeded Flying Leopards, before winning four straight contests to claim their first-ever CBA championship. The series was notable for a very controversial situation, however, as a brawl between a group of Sichuan fans and several Liaoning players erupted at a hotel lobby in Chengdu after Game Three. Footage of the incident went viral on numerous Chinese and international websites, and the league received scathing criticism from the country's media. The Blue Whales were fined by the CBA for not providing adequate security, while the Flying Leopards that were involved in the fight were to be disciplined at the start of the following season. Hamed Haddadi would also be the first Asian to not be born in a Chinese providence to be named the CBA Finals MVP in 2016.

The Sichuan Blue Whales drew an average home attendance of 6,624 in the 2015-16 CBA season, one of the highest averages in the league.

In the 2025-26 season, the Blue Whales hit their lowest point as a team as they finished the season with a record of 0-42, one of very few winless seasons in any professional basketball league.

== Roster ==
Note: Flags indicate national team eligibility at FIBA-sanctioned events. Players may hold other non-FIBA nationalities not displayed.

Sichuan Blue Whales roster
Players
Coaches

Pos.	No.	Nat.	Name	Ht.	Wt.
PG	0	(China)	Luo Jinzhui	1.86 m (6 ft 1 in)	72 kg (159 lb)
G/F	1	(China)	Jing Hanyi	1.95 m (6 ft 5 in)	98 kg (216 lb)
PG	2	(China)	Ren Tianxiang	1.85 m (6 ft 1 in)	75 kg (165 lb)
F/C	3	(China)	Meng Tianyi	2.06 m (6 ft 9 in)	105 kg (231 lb)
G	4	(United States)	Jalen Adams	1.91 m (6 ft 3 in)	88 kg (194 lb)
SF	6	(China)	Zheng Guichuan	1.92 m (6 ft 4 in)	88 kg (194 lb)
G/F	7	(China)	Xiao Yuren	1.96 m (6 ft 5 in)	93 kg (205 lb)
PG	8	(Puerto Rico)	Jordan Howard	1.80 m (5 ft 11 in)	82 kg (181 lb)
PG	9	(China)	Yu Xiaoyong	1.90 m (6 ft 3 in)	90 kg (198 lb)
PG	10	(China)	He Chiyu	1.85 m (6 ft 1 in)	80 kg (176 lb)
F	11	(China)	Zou Yunxuan	2.02 m (6 ft 8 in)	86 kg (190 lb)
C	14	(China)	Yuan Shibo	2.04 m (6 ft 8 in)	104 kg (229 lb)
C	16	(China)	Liu Wenke	2.18 m (7 ft 2 in)	100 kg (220 lb)
C	21	(Hong Kong)	Ma Kong San	2.08 m (6 ft 10 in)	114 kg (251 lb)
PG	23	(China)	Zhang Hengshuo	1.90 m (6 ft 3 in)	83 kg (183 lb)
PG	24	(China)	Yao Yuxin	1.88 m (6 ft 2 in)	85 kg (187 lb)
SF	25	(China)	Feng Xiaoyu	1.95 m (6 ft 5 in)	90 kg (198 lb)
F	33	(China)	Hong Xin	1.96 m (6 ft 5 in)	100 kg (220 lb)
SF	46	(China)	Zhang Lisheng	1.98 m (6 ft 6 in)	100 kg (220 lb)
PF	66	(China)	Jing Haoyang	2.00 m (6 ft 7 in)	98 kg (216 lb)
G	77	(China)	Huang Rongqi	1.88 m (6 ft 2 in)	80 kg (176 lb)
C	00	(United States)	Tyshaun Crawford	2.16 m (7 ft 1 in)	122 kg (269 lb)

Head coach

- (Slovenia) Simon Petrov

Assistant coach(es)

- (China) Yang Cheng
- (China) He Xiaobin
- (China) Guo Jinlin

Legend

- (C) Team captain
- Injured

- Roster
Updated: October 1, 2026

== Notable players ==
Note: Flags indicate national team eligibility at FIBA-sanctioned events. Players may hold other non-FIBA nationalities not displayed.

Criteria

To appear in this section a player must have either:

- Set a club record or won an individual award while at the club
- Played at least one official international match for their national team at any time
- Played at least one official NBA match at any time.

Current Chinese players

- (China) Liu Wei (2016–present)

Current International players

- (Iran) Hamed Haddadi (2013–2014, 2015–present)
- (United States) Mike Harris (2015–present)

Former International players

- (United States) Alan Ogg (1996–1997 under the Sichuan Pandas name)
- (United States) Hassan Whiteside (2013)
- (Chinese Taipei) Chang Tsung-hsien (2013–2015)
- (Ivory Coast) (France) Hervé Lamizana (2013)
- (United States) Darius Johnson-Odom (2013)
- (Nigeria) (United States) Michael Efevberha (2013–15)
- (United States) D.J. White (2013–2014)
- (United States) Daniel Orton (2014–2015)
- (United States) Metta World Peace (known in China as The Panda's Friend) (2014–2015)
- (United States) Josh Smith (2016–2017)
- (United States) Tyler Hansbrough (2019–2020)
