= Justin Carter =

American basketball player (born 1987)

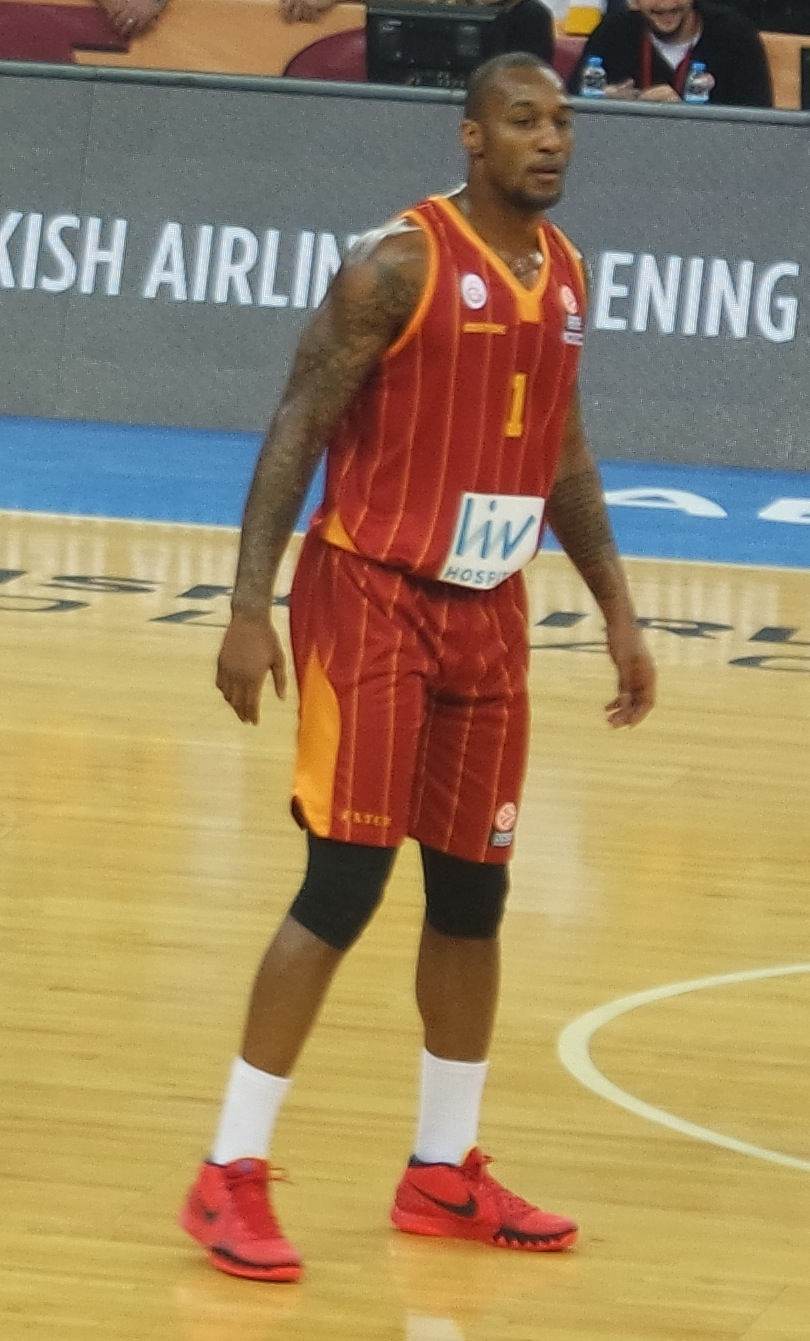
- Carter with Galatasaray in February 2015

Personal information
- Born: April 21, 1987 (age 39) Gaithersburg, Maryland
- Listed height: 1.93 m (6 ft 4 in)
- Listed weight: 91 kg (201 lb)

Career information
- High school: Watkins Mill (Gaithersburg, Maryland)
- College: Compton (2006–2007); Fullerton (2007–2008); Creighton (2008–2010)
- NBA draft: 2010: undrafted
- Playing career: 2010–2023
- Position: Shooting guard / small forward
- Number: 1, 6, 11

Career history
- 2010–2011: BK Vahostav-SK Zilina
- 2011: Vestelspor Manisa
- 2011–2012: Tire Belediye
- 2012–2014: Uşak Sportif
- 2015: Galatasaray
- 2015–2016: Pınar Karşıyaka
- 2016: Guangdong Southern Tigers
- 2016: Khimki
- 2016–2017: Maccabi Kiryat Gat
- 2017–2018: Astana
- 2018: Shabab Al Ahli
- 2019: Dinamo Sassari
- 2019: Chorale Roanne
- 2020: Varese
- 2020–2022: Zadar
- 2022–2023: Oradea

Career highlights
- FIBA Europe Cup champion (2019); Kazakhstan League champion (2018); Croatian League champion (2021); Kazakhstan Cup winner (2018); Croatian Cup winner (2021); TBL All-Star (2014)

Justin Anthony Carter (born April 21, 1987) is an American former professional basketball player. He played college basketball for Creighton.

== Professional career ==
After going undrafted in the 2010 NBA draft, Carter moved to Slovakia for the 2010–11 season, signed by BK Vahostav-SK Zilina. After that, he moved to Turkey to play there for several teams. Most recently he has played for Uşak Sportif of the Turkish Basketball League (TBL).

On December 29, 2014, Carter signed with Galatasaray Liv Hospital of Turkey for the rest of the 2014–15 season.

In July 2015, Carter joined the Phoenix Suns for the 2015 Las Vegas Summer League. On July 28, 2015, he returned to Turkey and signed with Pınar Karşıyaka. In late January 2016, he left Karşıyaka and signed with Guangdong Southern Tigers of China for the rest of the 2015–16 CBA season.

On August 26, 2016, Carter signed with Russian club Khimki for the 2016–17 season. On October 25, 2016, he was waived by Khimki after appearing in four games. Two days later, he signed with Israeli club Maccabi Kiryat Gat.

On August 17, 2017, Carter signed with Kazakhstani team Astana for the 2017–18 season. On September 30, 2018, he signed with Shabab Al Ahli of the UAE National Basketball League.

In January 2019, Carter signed with Dinamo Sassari of the Italian Lega Basket Serie A (LBA). On May 1, 2019, he won the FIBA Europe Cup with Dinamo.

On July 29, Carter signed with Chorale Roanne in the French LNB Pro A. Unfortunately the team was forced to withdraw the contract earlier: on 9th of December Chorale Roanne, indeed, announced the recission after the violent reaction against two players during the match against Élan Béarnais, played on the 30th of November which caused his deferment for 10 matches.

In the end of January he signed with Pallacanestro Varese until the end of the 2019–20 season.

On September 18, 2020, Carter signed with Zadar in the Croatian League and ABA League. He averaged 11.9 points, 2 assist and 1.1 steals per game in ABA Liga. Carter re-signed with the team on July 25, 2021.

In August 2022, after two seasons spent in Zadar, Carter moved to Oradea of the Romanian League.

== Career statistics ==
Legend
GP	Games played	GS	Games started	MPG	Minutes per game
FG%	Field-goal percentage	3P%	3-point field-goal percentage	FT%	Free-throw percentage
RPG	Rebounds per game	APG	Assists per game	SPG	Steals per game
BPG	Blocks per game	PPG	Points per game	PIR	Performance index rating
**Bold**	Career high

=== EuroLeague ===
Year	Team	GP	GS	MPG	FG%	3P%	FT%	RPG	APG	SPG	BPG	PPG	PIR
2014–15	Galatasaray	14	6	25.7	.436	.290	.694	4.3	2.6	.7	.5	8.3	12.5
Career		14	6	25.7	.436	.290	.694	4.3	2.6	.7	.5	8.3	12.5
