= Hu Weidong =

Chinese basketball player (born 1970)

Hu Weidong 胡卫东
Personal information
- Born: January 3, 1970 (age 56) Xuzhou, Jiangsu, China
- Listed height: 1.98 m (6 ft 6 in)
- Listed weight: 210 lb (95 kg)

Career information
- Playing career: 1995–2005
- Position: Guard / small forward

Career history

Playing
- 1995–2005: Jiangsu Dragons

Coaching
- 2004–2007: Jiangsu Dragons
- 2008–2010: Jiangsu Dragons (assistant)
- 2011–2012: Jiangsu Dragons
- 2015–2016: Anhui Wenyi

Career highlights
- 2× CBA MVP (1996, 1997)
Medals
Men's basketball
Representing China
FIBA Asia Cup
Gold medal – first place	1993 Jakarta
Gold medal – first place	1995 Seoul
Bronze medal – third place	1997 Riyadh
Gold medal – first place	1999 Fukuoka
Asian Games
Gold medal – first place	1994 Hiroshima
Gold medal – first place	1998 Bangkok
Silver medal – second place	2002 Busan
East Asian Games
Gold medal – first place	1993 Shanghai
Gold medal – first place	2001 Osaka
Universiade Games
Bronze medal – third place	1993 Buffalo
FIBA Under-18 Asia Championship
Gold medal – first place	1989 Manila
Bronze medal – third place	1990 Nagoya

Hu Weidong (simplified Chinese: 胡卫东; traditional Chinese: 胡衛東; pinyin: Hú Wèidōng; born January 3, 1970, in Xuzhou, Jiangsu) is a former Chinese professional basketball player. At 6 ft 6 in (1.98 m) tall, and 210 pounds (95 kg), he played as a point guard-shooting guard-small forward.

== Professional career ==
In 1985, Hu joined the Jiangsu Dragons' junior teams. He was a two-time MVP (1996 and 1997) in the Chinese Basketball Association (CBA), and he led the league in scoring three times.

Considered to be China's version of National Basketball Association (NBA) megastar Michael Jordan, Hu was offered the chance to play in the NBA league in 1998, but he was injured when the Dallas Mavericks offered him a contract, and he thus failed to become the first Chinese to play in the NBA. He was then offered a short term 10-day contract with the Orlando Magic in 2000, but he was injured shortly after, and was unable to take up the offer.

== Chinese national team ==
Hu represented the senior men's Chinese national basketball team from 1987 to 2002. Hu made a half court shot in the 1994 Goodwill Games, in which China collected the bronze medal, their only medal in non Asian play. He was the FIBA Asia Cup MVP in 1999.

== Coaching career ==
From 2005 to 2008, Hu was the head coach of his former team as a player, the Jiangsu Dragons. He accepted the job as the head coach of the Jiangsu Dragons again in December, 2011.
