= Liaoning Flying Leopards =

Chinese basketball team

- League: CBA
- Founded: 1953; 73 years ago (Note: The Liaoning Flying Leopards professional team was founded in 1995 after the establishment of the CBA, however, the team originates from the Northeast Sports Training Class Basketball Team, which was founded in 1953.)
- History: Liaoning Hunters (1995–2008); Liaoning Dinosaurs (2008–2011); Liaoning Flying Leopards (2011–present)
- Arena: Liaoning Gymnasium
- Capacity: 12,000
- Location: Hunnan District, Shenyang, Liaoning, China
- Team colors: Emerald green, white, black, gold
- Main sponsor: 3SBio Inc.
- Head coach: Hugo López
- Championships: 4 (2018, 2022, 2023, 2024)
- Retired numbers: 1 (12)
Home	Away	Third

The Liaoning Flying Leopards (simplified Chinese: 辽宁飞豹; traditional Chinese: 遼寧飛豹; pinyin: Liáoníng Fēibào), also known as the Liaoning Shenyang Sansheng Flying Leopard Club or Liaoning Bengang (辽宁本钢), are a Chinese professional basketball team based in Hunnan District, Shenyang, Liaoning, which plays in the Northern Division of the Chinese Basketball Association (CBA).

Flying Leopard used to play their home games at the Benxi Gymnasium in Benxi, but relocated to Shenyang in the 2017–18 season. The biopharmacy company 3SBio Inc. is the club's corporate sponsor. The team plays at the Liaoning Gymnasium.

Founded in 1953, Liaoning became a fully professional organization and member of the CBA in 1995, and since then they have won four championships. Liaoning also won the Asian continental title after winning the FIBA Asia Champions Cup in 1990, and were runners-up in 1988, 1992 and 1999.

== History ==
The club's history dates back to 1953, when the Northeast Sports Training Class Basketball Team (Chinese: 东北体育训练班篮球队) was formed, which later became the Liaoning Provincial Basketball Team (Chinese: 辽宁省篮球队). Liaoning won the national basketball championship in 1985, as well as in 1988, 1989, 1991 and 1992. During the late 1980s and 1990s, Liaoning represented China in the ABC Champions Cup and won a title in 1990.

Following the establishment of the Chinese Basketball Association (CBA) in 1995, the club was officially founded as a professional team as Liaoning Hunters.

During the 2004–05 CBA season, Liaoning finished in first place in the North Division, but lost in the quarter-finals of the CBA Playoffs to the South Division's Yunnan Bulls. The team would then go on to place seventh and fourth, respectively, over the next two years, before advancing to the CBA Finals following the 2007–08 CBA season. Although Liaoning eventually lost to the Guangdong Southern Tigers, the club did win the fourth game of the series. This was the team's first victory in the CBA Finals, despite multiple appearances. After finishing in fifth place in the 2009–10 CBA season, Liaoning would miss both the 2010–11 and the 2011–12 CBA playoffs.

In 2011, Liaoning Scale Industry took over sponsorship from the Liaoning Panpan Group Co., Ltd.

Before the 2012–13 CBA season began, the roster received a massive upheaval. Liaoning made multiple changes including the signings of Josh Akognon and Alexander Johnson. Meanwhile, veteran Bian Qiang retired, and many local players were either transferred or loaned out to other CBA teams. One of the most significant player transactions that occurred was the decision to let go of Zhang Qingpeng. It would later be revealed that this move was made in the interest of developing sharpshooter Guo Ailun. On 2 December 2012, the Flying Leopards beat the Tianjin Gold Lions 100–81. This was Liaoning's sixth straight home victory against Tianjin.

In 2013, the team started to receive sponsorship from Benxi Steel Group.

The Flying Leopards have since become regular contenders for the CBA title again, powered by such players as Guo, Han Dejun, and multi-time CBA International MVP Lester Hudson. Liaoning lost to the Beijing Ducks in six games in the 2015 CBA Finals, and to Sichuan Blue Whales in five games in the 2016 CBA Finals. After Game 3 of the 2016 Finals, a brawl broke between players from the visiting Liaoning Flying Leopards and fans of the Sichuan Blue Whales.

In the 2017–18 CBA season, Liaoning defeated Zhejiang Lions in the finals (4–0) and won their first CBA league title. The team relocated their home stadium from Benxi to Shenyang during the play-offs semi-finals.

In 2019, 3SBio Inc. officially took the sponsorship, and changed the team name. In the 2020–21 season, former national team player Yang Ming became the new head coach. Under his guidance, the Flying Leopards won three consecutive CBA championships (2021–22, 2022–23 and 2023–24), and also swept their opponents 4–0 in the finals on all three occasions.

== Players ==
=== Retired numbers ===
- #12 – Yang Ming (PG; 2004–2019); retired on 4 November 2019

=== Current roster ===
Note: Flags indicate national team eligibility at FIBA-sanctioned events. Players may hold other non-FIBA nationalities not displayed.

Liaoning Flying Leopards roster
Players
Coaches

Pos.	No.	Nat.	Name	Ht.	Wt.
SG	0	(United States)	Kyler Edwards	1.93 m (6 ft 4 in)	88 kg (194 lb)
F/C	1	(China)	Fu Hao	2.07 m (6 ft 9 in)	109 kg (240 lb)
PG	2	(United States)	Sharife Cooper	1.85 m (6 ft 1 in)	82 kg (181 lb)
G	3	(China)	Zhao Jiwei	1.85 m (6 ft 1 in)	80 kg (176 lb)
PG	7	(China)	Duan Ruiqi	1.90 m (6 ft 3 in)	82 kg (181 lb)
SF	8	(China)	Fu Yuanxu	2.01 m (6 ft 7 in)	90 kg (198 lb)
SF	9	(China)	Jiang Yuxing	1.94 m (6 ft 4 in)	94 kg (207 lb)
G/F	15	(China)	Xing Weihao	1.98 m (6 ft 6 in)	87 kg (192 lb)
PG	16	(China)	Liu Ziyang	1.85 m (6 ft 1 in)	75 kg (165 lb)
C	17	(China)	Yu Shanyuan	2.11 m (6 ft 11 in)	114 kg (251 lb)
PF	21	(China)	Wu Changze	2.03 m (6 ft 8 in)	98 kg (216 lb)
F	23	(China)	Zhao Sen	2.03 m (6 ft 8 in)	101 kg (223 lb)
PF	29	(China)	Dai Yanlong	2.10 m (6 ft 11 in)	113 kg (249 lb)
C	31	(China)	Zhang Chenzhifeng	2.14 m (7 ft 0 in)	118 kg (260 lb)
F/C	32	(United States)	Marquese Chriss	2.06 m (6 ft 9 in)	109 kg (240 lb)
SF	35	(China)	Sun Fuheng	1.95 m (6 ft 5 in)	100 kg (220 lb)
G	36	(China)	Yan Shouqi	1.90 m (6 ft 3 in)	91 kg (201 lb)
G/F	37	(China)	Li Huyi	1.86 m (6 ft 1 in)	85 kg (187 lb)

Head coach

- (Spain) Hugo López

Assistant coach(es)

- (China) Wu Naiqun
- (Argentina) Guido Fabbris

Legend

- (C) Team captain
- Injured

- Roster
Updated: 12 October 2026

== Honours ==
- Chinese Basketball Association (CBA)
  - Winners (4): 2017–18, 2021–22, 2022–23, 2023–24
  - Runners-up (8): 1996–97, 1997–98, 1998–99, 2007–08, 2014–15, 2015–16, 2019–20, 2020–21
- Chinese National Basketball Championship
  - Winners (5): 1985, 1988, 1989, 1991, 1992
- Asian Basketball Club Championship
  - Champions (1): 1990
  - Runners-up (3): 1988, 1992, 1999

== Notable players ==
Note: Flags indicate national team eligibility at FIBA-sanctioned events. Players may hold other non-FIBA nationalities not displayed.

Criteria

To appear in this section a player must have either:

- Set a club record or won an individual award while at the club
- Played at least one official international match for their national team at any time
- Played at least one official NBA match at any time.

- (China) Guo Shiqiang (1990s)
- (China) Li Xiaoyong (1990s)
- (China) Wang Zhidan (1990s)
- (China) Wu Naiqun (1990s)
- (China) Wu Qinglong (1990s)
- (China) Zhang Qingpeng (2001–2014)
- (United States) Eric Riley (2002–2003)
- (United States) Ernest Brown (2003–2004, 2006–2008)
- (China) Li Xiaoxu (2005–present)
- (United States) Jamal Sampson (2007–2008)
- (United States) Awvee Storey (2008–2009)
- (United States) Keith Closs (2009)
- (United States) Lorenzen Wright (2009)
- (Nigeria) Olumide Oyedeji (2009–2010)
- (United States) Chris Richard (2010–2011)
- (United States) Donta Smith (2010–2011)
- (China) Han Dejun (2010–present)
- (China) Guo Ailun (2010–2024)
- (United States) Rodney Carney (2011–2012)
- (United States) Josh Powell (2011–2012)
- (United States) Shavlik Randolph (2011–2012, 2015–2017)
- (China) Liu Zhixuan (2012–2022)
- (Nigeria) Josh Akognon (2012–2013)
- (United States) Alexander Johnson (2012–2013)
- (United States) Solomon Jones (2013)
- (United States) Vernon Macklin (2013)
- (United States) Dominique Jones (2013–2014)
- (United States) Hakim Warrick (2013–2014)
- (China) Zhao Jiwei (2013–present)
- (United States) Lester Hudson (2014–2015, 2015–2019)
- (United States) Brandon Bass (2017–2020)
- (United States) Lance Stephenson (2019)
- (United States) O. J. Mayo (2020–2021)
- (United States) Jonathon Simmons (2020–2021)
- (China) Zhang Zhenlin (2020–present)
- (United States) Kyle Fogg (2021–present)
- (United States) Jeremy Tyler (2021)
- (United States) Eric Moreland (2021–2024)
- (United States) JaKarr Sampson (2022–2023)
- (United States) Cameron Oliver (2025–2026)
