= Zhang Bin (basketball) =

Chinese basketball coach and former player

Zhang Bin 张斌
Personal information
- Born: 28 December 1961 (age 64) Jinan, Shandong, China

Career information
- Playing career: 1976–1994

Career history

Coaching
- 1997: China
- 1999–2000: Bayi Rockets
- 2014: China Men U18 （assistant)
- 2019–2022: Qingdao Eagles (assistant)
Medals
Men's basketball
Representing China
Asian Games
Gold medal – first place	1986 Seoul
Gold medal – first place	1990 Beijing

Zhang Bin (Chinese: 张斌; pinyin: Zhāng Bīn; born 28 December 1961 in Jinan, Shandong) is a Chinese basketball coach and former international player who competed in the 1984 Summer Olympics and in the 1988 Summer Olympics.
