= Wang Fei (basketball) =

Chinese basketball player

Wang Fei 王非
Personal information
- Born: March 25, 1963 (age 63) Beijing, China

Career information
- Playing career: 1979–1991

Career history

Playing
- 1979–1991: Bayi Rockets

Coaching
- 1994–1999: Bayi Rockets
- 1998–1999: China
- 2000–2001: Bayi Rockets
- 2001–2002: China
- 2005–2006: Xinjiang Flying Tigers
- 2007–2013: Zhejiang Lions
- 2018–2020: Shanxi Loongs
Medals
Men's basketball
Representing China
FIBA Asia Cup
| Gold medal – first place | 1989 Beijing |
| Gold medal – first place | 1991 Kobe |
Asian Games
| Gold medal – first place | 1986 Seoul |
| Gold medal – first place | 1990 Beijing |

Wang Fei (Chinese: 王非; pinyin: Wáng Fēi; born 25 March 1963 in Beijing) is a Chinese former basketball player who competed in the 1988 Summer Olympics.

He was the head coach of the China men's national basketball team between 1997 and 1999 and between 2001 and 2002.
