= List of basketball arenas =

This is a list of indoor arenas which are home to a professional basketball team in one of 13 major leagues worldwide, as of January, 2025. The criteria for being included in this list are that the league has at least 10 teams and that each team has a home arena with seating capacity of 2,000 or more. Developmental leagues, such as the NBA G League, are not included. Of the 13 leagues, 12 are men's leagues and one is a women's league (the WNBA).

== Basketball leagues referenced ==
#	League	Abbreviation	Country	Number of teams	Average arena capacity
1	National Basketball Association	NBA	USA/Canada	30	19,027
2	Chinese Basketball Association	CBA	China	20	10,590
3	Liga ACB	ACB	Spain	18	8,575
4	Ligue nationale de basket	LNB Élite	France	18 (Note: Only 17 of 18 teams in the LNB Élite league are represented in the table below because the arena for BCM Gravelines-Dunkerque was destroyed by fire on 12/24/23. The team plays its games in away arenas.)	4,810
5	Basketball Bundesliga	BBL	Germany	17	5,472
6	Lega Basket Serie A	LNB	Italy	16	5,617
7	Basketbol Süper Ligi	BSL	Turkey	16	7,200
8	Liga Nacional de Baloncesto Profesional	LNBP	Mexico	16	4,322
9	Adriatic League	ABA	Regional (Note: As of December 2024, the league consisted of pro teams from Bosnia and Herzegovina, Croatia, Montenegro, Serbia, Slovenia and the United Arab Emirates)	16	6,674
10	Women's National Basketball Association	WNBA	USA	13	14,640 (Note: Seven of the 13 WNBA teams share arenas with NBA teams)
11	VTB United League	VTB	Russia	12	6,886
12	National Basketball League	NBL	Australia/New Zealand	10	10,123
13	Korean Basketball League	KBL	South Korea	10	6,818

== Basketball arenas by capacity ==
#	Venue	Capacity	Opened	Basketball team(s)	League	Location	Image
1	Xfinity Mobile Arena	21,000	1996	Philadelphia 76ers	NBA	Philadelphia, United States	
2	Nanjing Youth Olympic Sports Park	21,000	2011	Nanjing Monkey Kings	CBA	Nanjing, China	
3	United Center	20,917	1994	Chicago Bulls	NBA	Chicago, United States	
4	Scotiabank Arena	20,511	1999	Toronto Raptors	NBA	Toronto, Canada	
5	Moda Center	20,500	1995	Portland Trail Blazers	NBA	Portland, United States	
6	Capital One Arena	20,356	1997	Washington Wizards	NBA	Washington, D.C., United States	
7	Little Caesars Arena	20,332	2017	Detroit Pistons	NBA	Detroit, United States	
8	Delta Center	20,000	1991	Utah Jazz	NBA	Salt Lake City, United States	
9	Target Center	20,000	1990	Minnesota Timberwolves, Minnesota Lynx	NBA, WNBA	Minneapolis, United States	
10	Crypto.com Arena	20,000	1999	Los Angeles Lakers, Los Angeles Sparks	NBA, WNBA	Los Angeles, United States	
11	Kaseya Center	19,600	1999	Miami Heat	NBA	Miami, United States	
12	TD Garden	19,580	1995	Boston Celtics	NBA	Boston, United States	
13	Ball Arena	19,520	1999	Denver Nuggets	NBA	Denver, United States	
14	Madison Square Garden	19,500	1968	New York Knicks	NBA	New York City, United States	
15	Rocket Arena	19,432	1994	Cleveland Cavaliers	NBA	Cleveland, United States	
16	American Airlines Center	19,200	2001	Dallas Mavericks	NBA	Dallas, United States	
17	Frost Bank Center	19,000	2002	San Antonio Spurs	NBA	San Antonio, United States	
18	Toyota Center	19,000	2003	Houston Rockets	NBA	Houston, United States	
19	Wukesong Arena	19,000	2008	Beijing Ducks	CBA	Beijing, China	
20	Kia Center	18,846	2010	Orlando Magic	NBA	Orlando, United States	
21	Mortgage Matchup Center	18,422	1992	Phoenix Suns, Phoenix Mercury	NBA, WNBA	Phoenix, United States	
22	Belgrade Arena	18,386	2004	KK Crvena zvezda, KK Partizan	ABA	Belgrade, Serbia	
23	Climate Pledge Arena	18,300	1962	Seattle Storm	WNBA	Seattle, United States	
24	Paycom Center	18,203	2002	Oklahoma City Thunder	NBA	Oklahoma City, United States	
25	Chase Center	18,064	2019	Golden State Warriors, Golden State Valkyries	NBA, WNBA	San Francisco, United States	
26	Qudos Bank Arena	18,000	1999	Sydney Kings	NBL	Sydney, Australia	
27	Shenzhen Gymnasium	18,000	2011	Shenzhen Leopards	CBA	Shenzhen, China	
28	Intuit Dome	18,000	2024	Los Angeles Clippers	NBA	Inglewood, United States	
29	Gainbridge Fieldhouse	18,000	1999	Indiana Pacers, Indiana Fever	NBA, WNBA	Indianapolis, United States	
30	FedExForum	17,794	2004	Memphis Grizzlies	NBA	Memphis, United States	
31	Smoothie King Center	17,791	1999	New Orleans Pelicans	NBA	New Orleans, United States	
32	Barclays Center	17,732	2012	Brooklyn Nets, New York Liberty	NBA, WNBA	Brooklyn, United States	
33	Golden 1 Center	17,608	2016	Sacramento Kings	NBA	Sacramento, United States	
34	Fiserv Forum	17,500	2018	Milwaukee Bucks	NBA	Milwaukee, United States	
35	Spectrum Center	17,500	2005	Charlotte Hornets	NBA	Charlotte, United States	
36	Coca-Cola Arena	17,000	2019	Dubai BC	ABA	Dubai, United Arab Emirates	
37	State Farm Arena	16,888	1999	Atlanta Hawks, Atlanta Dream	NBA, WNBA	Atlanta, United States	
38	Bank of Dongguan Basketball Center	16,133	2014	Guangdong Southern Tigers	CBA	Dongguan, China	
39	Sinan Erdem Dome	16,000	2010	Galatasaray S.K. (men's basketball)	BSL	Istanbul, Turkey	
40	Fernando Buesa Arena	15,504	1991	Saski Baskonia	ACB	Vitoria-Gasteiz, Spain	
41	Žalgiris Arena	15,415	2011	BC Žalgiris	LKL, EL	Kaunas, Lithuania	
42	Jinqiang International Event Center	15,000	2023	Sichuan Blue Whales	CBA	Chengdu, China	
43	Palacio de Deportes de la Comunidad de Madrid	15,000	2005	Real Madrid Baloncesto	ACB	Madrid, Spain	
44	Perth Arena	14,846	2012	Perth Wildcats	NBL	Perth, Australia	
45	Uber Arena	14,500	2008	Alba Berlin	BBL	Berlin, Germany	
46	Sajik Arena	14,099	1985	Busan KCC Egis	KBL	Busan, South Korea	
47	Ülker Sports and Event Hall	13,800	2012	Bahçeşehir Koleji S.K., Fenerbahçe S.K. (basketball)	BSL	Istanbul, Turkey	
48	Shanghai Indoor Stadium	13,000	1976	Shanghai Sharks	CBA	Shanghai, China	
49	Megasport Sport Palace	12,824	2006	PBC CSKA Moscow	VTB	Moscow, Russia	
50	Palau Municipal d'Esports de Badalona	12,760	1991	Club Joventut Badalona	ACB	Badalona, Spain	
51	Forum di Milano	12,700	1990	Olimpia Milano	LBA	Milan, Italy	
52	Conson Gymnasium	12,500	2009	Qingdao Eagles	CBA	Qingdao, China	
53	Arena Stožice	12,480	2010	KK Cedevita Olimpija	ABA	Ljubljana, Slovenia	
54	Ürümqi Olympic Sports Center	12,000	TBD	Xinjiang Flying Tigers	CBA	Ürümqi, China	
55	Michelob Ultra Arena	12,000	1999	Las Vegas Aces	WNBA	Paradise, United States	
56	Gran Canaria Arena	11,500	2014	CB Gran Canaria	ACB	Las Palmas, Spain	
57	Palacio de Deportes José María Martín Carpena	11,300	1999	Baloncesto Málaga	ACB	Málaga, Spain	
58	Jamsil Arena	11,069	1979	Seoul Samsung Thunders	KBL	Seoul, South Korea	
59	Brisbane Entertainment Centre	11,000	1986	Brisbane Bullets	NBL	Brisbane, Australia	
60	Coliseum da Coruña	11,000	1991	Básquet Coruña	ACB	A Coruña, Spain	
61	Pabellón Príncipe Felipe	10,744	1990	Basket Zaragoza	ACB	Zaragoza, Spain	
62	Gimnasio Manuel Bernardo Aguirre	10,530	1980	Dorados de Chihuahua	LNBP	Chihuahua, Mexico	
63	Ankara Arena	10,400	2010	Türk Telekom B.K.	BSL	, Ankara Turkey	
64	Wintrust Arena	10,387	2017	Chicago Sky	WNBA	Chicago, United States	
65	Vitrifrigo Arena	10,323	1996	Victoria Libertas Pallacanestro	LBA	Pesaro, Italy	
66	John Cain Arena	10,300	2000	Melbourne United, S.E. Melbourne Phoenix	NBL	Melbourne, Australia	
67	Bilbao Arena	10,014	2010	Bilbao Basket	ACB	Bilbao, Spain	
68	Basketbol Gelişim Merkezi	10,000	2024	Anadolu Efes S.K.	BSL	Istanbul, Turkey	
69	Adelaide Entertainment Centre	10,000	1991	Adelaide 36ers	NBL	Adelaide, Australia	
70	Tianjin Arena	10,000	1995	Tianjin Pioneers	CBA	Tianjin, China	
71	Wutaishan Gymnasium	10,000	1975	Jiangsu Dragons	CBA	Nanjing, China	
72	Liaoning Gymnasium	10,000	2007	Liaoning Flying Leopards	CBA	Shenyang, China	
73	Saryarka Velodrome	10,000	2011	BC Astana	VTB	Astana, Kazakhstan	
74	Virtus Segafredo Arena	9,980	2019	Virtus Bologna	LBA	Bologna, Italy	
75	Spark Arena	9,740	2007	New Zealand Breakers	NBL	Auckland, New Zealand	
76	Palacio Municipal de Deportes de Granada	9,507	1991	Fundación CB Granada	ACB	Granada, Spain	
77	Mohegan Sun Arena	9,323	1996	Connecticut Sun	WNBA	Uncasville, United States	
78	Pavelló Municipal Font de Sant Lluís	9,000	1983	Valencia Basket	ACB	Valencia, Spain	
79	Shandong Arena	8,800	1979	Shandong Hi-Speed Kirin	CBA	Jinan, China	
80	Krešimir Ćosić Hall	8,500	2008	KK Zadar	ABA	Zadar, Croatia	
81	Adidas Arena	8,000	2024	Paris Basketball	LNB Élite	Paris, France	
82	Tianhe Gymnasium	7,600	2001	Guangzhou Loong Lions	CBA	Guangzhou, China	
83	Palau Blaugrana	7,585	1971	FC Barcelona Bàsquet	ACB	Barcelona, Spain	
84	Basket-Hall Krasnodar	7,500	2011	PBC Lokomotiv Kuban	VTB	Krasnodar, Russia	
85	Servet Tazegül Arena	7,500	2013	Mersin MSK	BSL	Mersin, Turkey	
86	Tofaş Nilüfer Spor Salonu	7,500	2014	Bursaspor Basketbol, Tofaş S.K.	BSL	Nilüfer, Turkey	
87	Basket-Hall Kazan	7,482	2003	BC UNICS	VTB	Kazan, Russia	
88	Palacio de Deportes de Murcia	7,454	1994	UCAM Murcia CB	ACB	Murcia, Spain	
89	KSK Arena	7,120	2013	BC Zenit Saint Petersburg	VTB	Saint Petersburg, Russia	
90	Olympic Sports Center Gymnasium (Beijing)	7,000	2008	Beijing Royal Fighters	CBA	Beijing, China	
91	College Park Center	7,000	2012	Dallas Wings	WNBA	Arlington, United States	
92	Universal Sports Palace Molot	7,000	1966	BC Parma	VTB	Perm, Russia	
93	Anyang Gymnasium	6,690	2000	Anyang Jung Kwan Jang Red Boosters	KBL	Anyang, South Korea	
94	Volkswagen Halle	6,600	2000	Basketball Löwen Braunschweig	BBL	Braunschweig, Germany	
95	BMW Park	6,500	1972	FC Bayern Munich (basketball)	BBL	Munich, Germany	
96	Karşıyaka Arena	6,500	2005	Karşıyaka Basket	BSL	İzmir, Turkey	
97	Goyang Gymnasium	6,216	2011	Goyang Sono Skygunners	KBL	Goyang, South Korea	
98	Rhénus Sport	6,200	1974	SIG Strasbourg	LNB Élite	Strasbourg, France	
99	Brose Arena	6,150	2001	Bamberg Baskets	BBL	Bamberg, Germany	
100	Pavelló Barris Nord	6,100	2001	Força Lleida CE	ACB	Lleida, Spain	
101	Ratiopharm Arena	6,100	2011	Ratiopharm Ulm	BBL	Neu-Ulm, Germany	
102	Kristall Ice Sports Palace	6,100	1969	BC Avtodor	VTB	Saratov, Russia	
103	Große EWE Arena	6,069	2013	Baskets Oldenburg	BBL	Oldenburg, Germany	
104	Palais des Sports Jean Weille	6,027	1976	SLUC Nancy Basket	LNB Élite	Nancy, France	
105	Antarès	6,023	1995	Le Mans Sarthe Basket	LNB Élite	Le Mans, France	
106	Changwon Gymnasium	6,000	1996	Changwon LG Sakers	KBL	Changwon, South Korea	
107	Telekom Dome	6,000	2008	Telekom Baskets Bonn	BBL	Bonn, Germany	
108	WIN Entertainment Centre	6,000	1998	Illawarra Hawks	NBL	Wollongong, Australia	
109	Morača Sports Center	6,000	1978	KK Studentski centar, KK Budućnost	ABA	Podgorica, Montenegro	
110	Yiwu Gymnasium	6,000	2005	Zhejiang Golden Bulls	CBA	Yiwu, China	
111	Zuchang Gymnasium	6,000	2002	Fujian Sturgeons	CBA	Jinjiang, China	
112	Dongchun Gymnasium	5,831	2001	Ulsan Hyundai Mobis Phoebus	KBL	Ulsan, South Korea	
113	Polifórum Benito Juárez	5,800	2009	El Calor de Cancún	LNBP	Cancún, Mexico	
114	Astroballe	5,556	1995	ASVEL Basket	LNB Élite	Villeurbanne, France	
115	Palais des Sports de Beaublanc	5,516	1981	Limoges CSP	LNB Élite	Limoges, France	
116	PalaBarbuto	5,500	2003	Napoli Basket	LBA	Naples, Italy	
117	Pavelló Girona-Fontajau	5,500	1993	Bàsquet Girona	ACB	Girona, Spain	
118	Trade Union Sport Palace	5,500	1965	BC Nizhny Novgorod	VTB	Nizhny Novgorod, Russia	
119	Dražen Petrović Basketball Hall	5,400	1987	KK Cibona	ABA	Zagreb, Croatia	
120	Jamsil Students' Gymnasium	5,400	1977	Seoul SK Knights	KBL	Seoul, South Korea	
121	Palaverde	5,344	1983	Universo Treviso Basket	LBA	Treviso, Italy	
122	Taiyuan Riverside Sports Centre Gymnasium	5,331	1998	Shanxi Loongs	CBA	Taiyuan, China	
123	Arena Ludwigsburg	5,325	2009	Riesen Ludwigsburg	BBL	Ludwigsburg, Germany	
124	Pazo dos Deportes	5,310	1992	CB Breogán	ACB	Lugo, Spain	
125	Palasport Lino Oldrini	5,300	1964	Pallacanestro Varese	LBA	Varese, Italy	
126	Cairns Convention Centre	5,300	1996	Cairns Taipans	NBL	Cairns, Australia	
127	Gimnasio Olímpico Juan de la Barrera	5,242	1968	Diablos Rojos del México	LNBP	Mexico City, Mexico	
128	Volkswagen Arena (Istanbul)	5,240	2014	Darüşşafaka Basketbol	BSL	Istanbul, Turkey	
129	PalaLeonessa	5,200	1967	Pallacanestro Brescia	LBA	Brescia, Italy	
130	Messe Chemnitz	5,200	2003	Niners Chemnitz	BBL	Chemnitz, Germany	
131	La Meilleraie	5,191	1987	Cholet Basket	LNB Élite	Cholet, France	
132	Hangzhou Gymnasium	5,136	1966	Zhejiang Lions	CBA	Hangzhou, China	
133	Pabellón Insular Santiago Martín	5,100	1999	CB Canarias	ACB	San Cristóbal de La Laguna, Spain	
134	Halle André Vacheresse	5,020	2011	Chorale Roanne Basket	LNB Élite	Roanne, France	
135	Süwag Energie ARENA	5,002	1988	Skyliners Frankfurt	BBL	Frankfurt, Germany	
136	Salle Gaston Médecin	5,000	1985	AS Monaco Basket	LNB Élite	Fontvieille, Monaco	
137	Youngor Arena	5,000	1994	Ningbo Rockets	CBA	Ningbo, China	
138	SNP Dome	5,000	2021	USC Heidelberg	BBL	Heidelberg, Germany	
139	Poliesportiu d'Andorra	5,000	1991	BC Andorra	ACB	Andorra la Vella, Andorra	
140	Palasport Roberta Serradimigni	5,000	1981	Dinamo Sassari	LBA	Sassari, Italy	
141	Palace of Sporting Games	5,000	2003	BC Uralmash Yekaterinburg	VTB	Yekaterinburg, Russia	
142	Ice Sports Palace	5,000	TBD	BC Samara	VTB	Samara, Russia	
143	Krylatskoye Sports Palace	5,000	2006	MBA Moscow	VTB	Moscow, Russia	
144	Pamukkale University Arena	5,000	2014	Merkezefendi Belediyesi Denizli Basket	BSL	Denizli, Turkey	
145	Gimnasio Nuevo León	5,000	1979	Fuerza Regia de Monterrey	LNBP	Monterrey, Mexico	
146	Ranko Žeravica Sports Hall	5,000	1968	KK Mega Basket	ABA	Belgrade, Serbia	
147	Pavelló Nou Congost	5,000	1992	Bàsquet Manresa	ACB	Manresa, Spain	
148	Auditorio del Estado	4,779	1985	Soles de Mexicali	LNBP	Mexicali, Mexico	
149	PalaBigi	4,600	1968	Pallacanestro Reggiana	LBA	Reggio Emilia, Italy	
150	Wonju Gymnasium	4,600	2013	Wonju DB Promy	KBL	Wonju, South Korea	
151	Stadthalle Rostock	4,550	1979	Rostock Seawolves	BBL	Rostock, Germany	
152	Le Colisée	4,540	2001	Élan Chalon	LNB Élite	Chalon-sur-Saône, France	
153	Gimnasio Solidaridad Municipal	4,500	1994	Plateros de Fresnillo	LNBP	Fresnillo, Mexico	
154	Domo de la Feria	4,463	1980	Abejas de León	LNBP	León, Mexico	
155	Suwon KT Sonicboom Arena	4,407	2016	Suwon KT Sonicboom	KBL	Suwon, South Korea	
156	PalaTrento	4,360	2000	Aquila Basket Trento	LBA	Trento, Italy	
157	Derwent Entertainment Centre	4,340	1989	Tasmania JackJumpers	NBL	Hobart, Australia	
158	Changchun Gymnasium	4,299	1957	Jilin Northeast Tigers	CBA	Changchun, China	
159	Entertainment and Sports Arena	4,200	2018	Washington Mystics	WNBA	Washington, D.C., United States	
160	Palais des Sports de Dijon	4,147	1977	JDA Dijon Basket	LNB Élite	Dijon, France	
161	Arena Sever	4,100	2011	BC Enisey	VTB	Krasnoyarsk, Russia	
162	Borac Hall	4,000	1969	KK Borac Čačak	ABA	Čačak, Serbia	
163	Palais des sports Marcel-Cerdan	4,000	1992	Metropolitans 92	LNB Élite	Paris, France	
164	Auditorio Benito Juárez	4,000	1972	Halcones Rojos Veracruz	LNBP	Veracruz, Mexico	
165	Palais des Sports Pierre Ratte	4,000	1972	Saint-Quentin Basket-Ball	LNB Élite	Saint-Quentin, France	
166	PalaCarrara	3,990	1988	Pistoia Basket 2000	LBA	Pistoia, Italy	
167	Daegu Gymnasium	3,867	1971	Daegu KOGAS Pegasus	KBL	Daegu, South Korea	
168	Muradiye Sports Hall	3,679	TBD	Manisa Basket	BSL	Manisa, Turkey	
169	Arena BUAP	3,631	1984	Lobos Plateados de la BUAP	LNBP	Puebla, Mexico	
170	Ekinox	3,548	2014	JL Bourg Basket	LNB Élite	Bourg-en-Bresse, France	
171	PalaPentassuglia	3,534	1981	New Basket Brindisi	LBA	Brindisi, Italy	
172	Palasport Mario Radi	3,519	1980	Guerino Vanoli Basket	LBA	Cremona, Italy	
173	PalaFerraris	3,510	TBD	Derthona Basket	LBA	Tortona, Italy	
174	Palasport Giuseppe Taliercio	3,509	1978	Reyer Venezia	LBA	Venice, Italy	
175	Arena Astros	3,509	2019	Astros de Jalisco	LNBP	Guadalajara, Mexico	
176	PalaMangano	3,500	2001	Scafati Basket	LBA	Scafati, Italy	
177	Arena Gripe	3,500	1979	KK Split	ABA	Split, Croatia	
178	Le Chaudron	3,500	2015	ESSM Le Portel	LNB Élite	Le Portel, France	
179	Gimnasio Marcelino González	3,458	TBD	Mineros de Zacatecas	LNBP	Zacatecas, Mexico	
180	Sparkassen Arena	3,447	2011	BG Göttingen	BBL	Göttingen, Germany	
181	Inselpark Arena	3,400	2014	Hamburg Towers	BBL	Hamburg, Germany	
182	Auditorio Miguel Barragán	3,400	1970	Santos del Potosí	LNBP	San Luis Potosí, Mexico	
183	BJK Akatlar Arena	3,200	2004	Beşiktaş J.K. (men's basketball)	BSL	Istanbul, Turkey	
184	Tectake Arena	3,140	1981	Würzburg Baskets	BBL	Würzburg, Germany	
185	Rasta Dome	3,140	2012	SC Rasta Vechta	BBL	Vechta, Germany	
186	Laktaši Sports Hall	3,050	2010	KK Igokea	ABA	Laktaši, Bosnia and Herzegovina	
187	Stadthalle Weißenfels	3,000	2002	Mitteldeutscher BC	BBL	Weißenfels, Germany	
188	Gimnasio Hermanos Carreón	3,000	TBD	Panteras de Aguascalientes	LNBP	Aguascalientes, Mexico	
189	Inforum (Irapuato)	3,000	2013	Freseros de Irapuato	LNBP	Irapuato, Mexico	
190	Železnik Hall	3,000	TBD	KK FMP	ABA	Belgrade, Serbia	
191	Palais des Sports Maurice Thorez	3,000	2015	Nanterre 92	LNB Élite	Nanterre, France	
192	Gimnasio USBI	2,638	2003	Halcones de Xalapa	LNBP	Xalapa, Mexico	
193	Topolica Sport Hall	2,625	2009	KK Mornar Bar	ABA	Bar, Montenegro	
194	Jeu de Paume	2,500	2017	ADA Blois Basket 41	LNB Élite	Blois, France	
195	Enka Sport Hall	2,500	2003	Petkim Spor	BSL	İzmir, Turkey	
196	SC Dudova šuma	2,500	1968	KK Spartak Subotica	ABA	Subotica, Serbia	
197	Leon Štukelj Hall	2,500	TBD	KK Krka	ABA	Novo Mesto, Slovenia	
198	Gazanfer Bilge Sports Hall	2,500	2005	Büyükçekmece Basketbol	BSL	Istanbul, Turkey	
199	Yalova 90. Yıl Spor Salonu	2,500	2014	Yalovaspor BK	BSL	Yalova, Turkey	
200	Gimnasio Multidisciplinario UAT Victoria	2,200	TBD	Correbasket UAT	LNBP	Ciudad Victoria, Mexico	

== See also ==
- Lists of stadiums
- List of NBA arenas
- List of NCAA Men's Division I Basketball Tournament venues
- List of NCAA Division I basketball arenas
- List of National Basketball League (Australia) venues
- List of indoor arenas by capacity
- List of ice hockey arenas by capacity
