= 2018–19 Chinese Basketball Association season =

CBA
- Season: 2018–19
- Games played: 46
- Teams: 20

Regular season
- Top seed: Guangdong Southern Tigers

Finals
- Champions: Guangdong Southern Tigers
- Runners-up: Xinjiang Flying Tigers
- Semi-finalists: Liaoning Flying Leopards; Shenzhen Leopards

Awards
- Domestic MVP: (China) Wang Zhelin
- International MVP: (Bulgaria) Darius Adams

Statistical leaders
| Points | (United States) Pierre Jackson | 39.8 |
| Rebounds | (United States) Jason Thompson | 14.9 |
| Assists | (United States) Courtney Fortson | 10.9 |

The 2018–19 CBA season was the 24th season of the Chinese Basketball Association (CBA). In this campaign, the regular season expands from 38 games to 46 games, while the playoffs expand from 10 teams to 12 teams.

== Team changes ==
The Shanxi Brave Dragons changed their official English name to the Shanxi Loongs at a lavish unveiling ceremony in September. “Loongs” is the Cantonese term for Dragons and was chosen by team ownership, even though people living in Shanxi speak Mandarin Chinese.

The Bayi Rockets began playing their home games in Nanchang after spending many years in Ningbo, and the Zhejiang Guangsha Lions began playing their home games in Zhuji to cultivate a fanbase away from central Hangzhou and stop splintering local support with the Zhejiang Golden Bulls.

== Venues ==
| Team | Home city | Arena | Capacity |
|---|---|---|---|
| Bayi Rockets | Nanchang | Nanchang International Sports Center Gymnasium | 11,000 |
| Beijing Ducks | Beijing | Cadillac Arena | 18,000 |
| Beikong Fly Dragons | Beijing | Olympic Sports Center Gymnasium | 6,300 |
| Fujian Sturgeons | Jinjiang | Zuchang Gymnasium | 6,000 |
| Guangdong Southern Tigers | Dongguan | Nissan Sports Centre | 14,730 |
| Guangzhou Long-Lions | Guangzhou | Tianhe Gymnasium | 8,628 |
| Jiangsu Dragons | Suzhou | Suzhou Sports Center Gymnasium | N/A |
| Jilin Northeast Tigers | Changchun | Changchun Gymnasium | 4,150 |
| Liaoning Flying Leopards | Shenyang | Liaoning Gymnasium | 6,521 |
| Nanjing Monkey Kings | Nanjing | Nanjing Youth Olympic Sports Park | 22,000 |
| Qingdao Eagles | Qingdao | Guoxin Gymnasium | 12,500 |
| Shandong Golden Stars | Jinan | Shandong Arena | 8,800 |
| Shanghai Sharks | Shanghai | Pudong Yuanshen Gymnasium | 5,000 |
| Shanxi Loongs | Taiyuan | Shanxi Sports Centre Gymnasium | 8,000 |
| Shenzhen Leopards | Shenzhen | Shenzhen Dayun Arena | 18,000 |
| Sichuan Blue Whales | Chengdu | Sichuan Provincial Gymnasium | 9,200 |
| Tianjin Gold Lions | Tianjin | Dongli Gymnasium | 3,000 |
| Xinjiang Flying Tigers | Ürümqi | Hongshan Arena | 3,800 |
| Zhejiang Golden Bulls | Hangzhou | Binjiang Gymnasium | 6,000 |
| Zhejiang Guangsha Lions | Zhuji | Zhuji Sports Centre Gymnasium | 5,136 |

== Head coaches ==
| Team | Head Coach | Replaced During Season |
|---|---|---|
| Bayi Rockets | (China) Wang Zhizhi | |
| Beijing Ducks | (Greece) Yannis Christopoulos | |
| Beikong Fly Dragons | (China) Zhang Degui | (China) Ding Wei |
| Fujian Sturgeons | (China) Zhu Shilong | |
| Guangdong Southern Tigers | (China) Du Feng | |
| Guangzhou Long-Lions | (Spain) Juan Antonio Orenga | |
| Jiangsu Dragons | (Slovenia) Memi Becirovic | |
| Jilin Northeast Tigers | (China) Wang Han | |
| Liaoning Flying Leopards | (China) Guo Shiqiang | |
| Nanjing Monkey Kings | (Lithuania) Gintaras Krapikas | |
| Qingdao Eagles | (China) Fan Bin | |
| Shandong Golden Stars | (China) Wu Qinglong | |
| Shanghai Sharks | (China) Li Qiuping | |
| Shanxi Loongs | (China) Wang Fei | |
| Shenzhen Leopards | (China) Wang Jianjun | |
| Sichuan Blue Whales | (China) Ying Kui | (Germany) Dirk Bauermann |
| Tianjin Gold Lions | (Serbia) Anton "Toni" Vujanic | |
| Xinjiang Flying Tigers | (China) Adiljan Suleyman | (United States) (Australia) Brian Goorjian |
| Zhejiang Golden Bulls | (China) Liu Weiwei | |
| Zhejiang Guangsha Lions | (China) Li Chunjiang | |

== Draft ==
The 2018 CBA Draft, the fourth edition of the CBA draft, took place on 29 July 2018. 14 players were selected in the draft.

| Rnd. | Pick | Player | Nationality (Note: Nationality indicates the player's national team or representative nationality. If a player has not competed at the international level, then the nationality indicates the national team which the player is eligible to represent according to FIBA rules.) | Team | School / club team |
|---|---|---|---|---|---|
| 1 | 1 | Jiang Yuxing | China | Jilin Northeast Tigers | Henan Roaring Elephants (NBL) |
| 1 | 2 | Yuan Zhenliang | China | Sichuan Blue Whales | Hefei Yuanchuang (NBL) |
| 1 | 3 | Liu Shuai | China | Tianjin Gold Lions | Luoyang Zhonghe (NBL) |
| 1 | 4 | Wang Siqi | China | Qingdao Eagles | Taiyuan University of Technology |
| 1 | 5 | Li Bairun | China | Nanjing Monkey Kings | Shenzhen Leopards Youth |
| 1 | 6 | Wang Zilu | China | Zhejiang Golden Bulls | Zhejiang Guangsha Lions Youth |
| 1 | 7 | Tian Yuheng | China | Guangzhou Long-Lions | Guangdong Southern Tigers Youth |
| 1 | 8 | Zhao Yanman | China | Beijing Ducks | Hunan Baining (NBL) |
| 1 | 9 | Ji Xiang | China | Guangdong Southern Tigers | Shandong Golden Stars Youth |
| 2 | 1 | Luan Xiaojun | China | Tianjin Gold Lions | Shandong Agricultural University |
| 2 | 2 | Shi Wenlong | China | Qingdao Eagles | Bayi Rockets Youth |
| 2 | 3 | Zhu Ying | China | Shanghai Sharks | Shanghai Sharks Youth |
| 2 | 4 | Si Kun | China | Guangzhou Long-Lions | Lhasa Pure Land (NBL) |
| 2 | 5 | Wan Shengwei | China | Guangdong Southern Tigers | Peking University |

== Foreign players policy ==
All teams except the Bayi Rockets can have two foreign players. The bottom two teams from the previous season (except Bayi) have the additional right to sign an extra Asian player.

=== Rules Chart ===
The rules for using foreign players in each game are described in this chart:

| # | Facing other teams | Facing Bayi Rockets |
|---|---|---|
| Chinese players+ | No Limit | No Limit |
| Asian players++ | No Limit | 4 quarters collectively+++ |
| International players | 6 quarters collectively+++ | 4 quarters collectively+++ |

+ Including players from Hong Kong and Taiwan.

++ If a team waives its right to sign an extra Asian player, it may use its 2 foreign players for 7 quarters collectively.

+++ Only 1 allowed in the 4th quarter.

=== Import chart ===
This is the full list of international players who competed in the CBA during the 2018-19 season.

| Team | Player 1 | Player 2 | Asian Player | Replaced During Season |
|---|---|---|---|---|
| Bayi Rockets | – | – | –^{1} | – |
| Beijing Ducks | (United States) Aaron Jackson | (United States) Justin Hamilton | N/A | |
| Beikong Fly Dragons | (United States) Ricky Ledo | (United States) Thomas Robinson | N/A | (United States) Pierre Jackson (United States) Shavlik Randolph |
| Fujian Sturgeons | (Ukraine) Eugene Jeter | (Canada) Andrew Nicholson | N/A | (United States) Russ Smith (United States) Xavier Munford |
| Guangdong Southern Tigers | (United States) Michael Beasley | (United States) MarShon Brooks | N/A | (United States) Malcolm Delaney (United States) Sonny Weems |
| Guangzhou Long-Lions | (United States) Kyle Fogg | (United States) Lorenzo Brown | N/A | (United States) Marreese Speights (United States) Cory Jefferson |
| Jiangsu Dragons | (United States) Donald Sloan | (Serbia) Miroslav Raduljica | N/A | (United States) Jerome Dyson |
| Jilin Northeast Tigers | (United States) Dominique Jones | (Poland) Maciej Lampe | N/A | |
| Liaoning Flying Leopards | (United States) Lester Hudson | (United States) Brandon Bass | N/A | |
| Nanjing Monkey Kings | (United States) Joe Young | (United States) Isaiah Austin | N/A | (United States) Adreian Payne |
| Qingdao Eagles | (United States) Jonathan Gibson | (United States) Dakari Johnson | N/A | |
| Shandong Golden Stars | (United States) Ty Lawson | (Lithuania) Donatas Motiejūnas | N/A | (United States) Andrew Goudelock (United States) JaKarr Sampson |
| Shanghai Sharks | (United States) Jimmer Fredette | (Argentina) Luis Scola | N/A | |
| Shanxi Loongs | (United States) Bobby Brown | (United States) Shabazz Muhammad | N/A | (United States) Chris McCullough (United States) Josh Adams |
| Shenzhen Leopards | (United States) Dwight Buycks | (United States) Kenny Boynton | N/A | (United States) Quincy Acy (United States) Jared Sullinger |
| Sichuan Blue Whales | (United States) Jordan Crawford | (United States) Jason Thompson | –^{1} | (United States) Jamaal Franklin |
| Tianjin Gold Lions | (Montenegro) Taylor Rochestie | (Philippines) Andray Blatche | N/A | (United States) Cole Aldrich |
| Xinjiang Flying Tigers | (United States) Kay Felder | (United States) Jarnell Stokes | N/A | (Bulgaria) Darius Adams (United States) Al Jefferson (United States) Nick Minnerath (Iran) Hamed Haddadi |
| Zhejiang Golden Bulls | (United States) Marcus Denmon | (United States) Brandon Paul | N/A | (United States) Archie Goodwin (United States) Tyler Hansbrough |
| Zhejiang Guangsha Lions | (United States) Courtney Fortson | (Greece) Ioannis Bourousis | N/A | |

- ^1 Sichuan and Bayi, the bottom two teams of last season, renounced the right of signing an Asian player.

== Regular season standings ==
| # | 2018–19 CBA regular season | | | | | |
| # | Team | W | L | Pct. | Pts. | Tiebreaker |
|---|---|---|---|---|---|---|
| 1 | Guangdong Southern Tigers | 42 | 4 | .913 | 86 | |
| 2 | Liaoning Flying Leopards | 38 | 8 | .826 | 84 | |
| 3 | Xinjiang Flying Tigers | 33 | 13 | .717 | 79 | Xinjiang 2–0 Shenzhen |
| 4 | Shenzhen Leopards | 33 | 13 | .717 | 79 | Xinjiang 2–0 Shenzhen |
| 5 | Beijing Ducks | 31 | 15 | .674 | 77 | Beijing 2–2 Guangsha; Beijing 396–394 Guangsha |
| 6 | Zhejiang Guangsha Lions | 31 | 15 | .674 | 77 | Beijing 2–2 Guangsha; Beijing 396–394 Guangsha |
| 7 | Fujian Sturgeons | 27 | 19 | .587 | 73 | |
| 8 | Shandong Golden Stars | 26 | 20 | .565 | 72 | |
| 9 | Jiangsu Dragons | 24 | 22 | .522 | 70 | Jiangsu 1–1 Jilin; Jiangsu 211–198 Jilin |
| 10 | Jilin Northeast Tigers | 24 | 22 | .522 | 70 | Jiangsu 1–1 Jilin; Jiangsu 211–198 Jilin |
| 11 | Zhejiang Golden Bulls | 23 | 23 | .500 | 69 | Zhejiang 2–2; Shanghai 2–2; Guangzhou 2–2; Win/Loss rate: Zhejiang 1.04, Shanghai 0.99, Guangzhou 0.98 |
| 12 | Shanghai Sharks | 23 | 23 | .500 | 69 | Zhejiang 2–2; Shanghai 2–2; Guangzhou 2–2; Win/Loss rate: Zhejiang 1.04, Shanghai 0.99, Guangzhou 0.98 |
| 13 | Guangzhou Long-Lions | 23 | 23 | .500 | 69 | Zhejiang 2–2; Shanghai 2–2; Guangzhou 2–2; Win/Loss rate: Zhejiang 1.04, Shanghai 0.99, Guangzhou 0.98 |
| 14 | Shanxi Loongs | 16 | 30 | .348 | 62 | |
| 15 | Qingdao Eagles | 13 | 33 | .283 | 59 | |
| 16 | Tianjin Gold Lions | 12 | 34 | .261 | 58 | |
| 17 | Sichuan Blue Whales | 11 | 35 | .239 | 57 | Sichuan 2–2; Bayi 2–2; Nanjing 2–2; Win/Loss rate: Sichuan 1.01, Bayi 0.997, Nanjing 0.991 |
| 18 | Bayi Rockets | 11 | 35 | .239 | 57 | Sichuan 2–2; Bayi 2–2; Nanjing 2–2; Win/Loss rate: Sichuan 1.01, Bayi 0.997, Nanjing 0.991 |
| 19 | Nanjing Monkey Kings | 11 | 35 | .239 | 57 | Sichuan 2–2; Bayi 2–2; Nanjing 2–2; Win/Loss rate: Sichuan 1.01, Bayi 0.997, Nanjing 0.991 |
| 20 | Beikong Fly Dragons | 8 | 38 | .174 | 54 | |

Key to colors
| Top 4 teams advance directly to Quarterfinals of CBA Playoffs |
| 5th-12th place teams progress to First Round of CBA Playoffs |

== Playoffs ==
First round Best-of-three
8 | Shandong Golden Stars | 0
9 | Jiangsu Dragons | 2
5 | Beijing Ducks | 2
12 | Shanghai Sharks | 0
6 | Zhejiang Lions | 2
11 | Zhejiang Golden Bulls | 1
7 | Fujian Sturgeons | 2
10 | Jilin Northeast Tigers | 0

Quarterfinals; Best-of-five
1 | Guangdong Southern Tigers | 3
9 | Jiangsu Dragons | 0
4 | Shenzhen Leopards | 3
5 | Beijing Ducks | 2
3 | Xinjiang Flying Tigers | 3
6 | Zhejiang Lions | 1
2 | Liaoning Flying Leopards | 3
7 | Fujian Sturgeons | 0

Semifinals; Best-of-seven
1 | Guangdong Southern Tigers | 4
4 | Shenzhen Leopards | 0
3 | Xinjiang Flying Tigers | 4
2 | Liaoning Flying Leopards | 1

Finals; Best-of-seven
1 | Guangdong Southern Tigers | 4
3 | Xinjiang Flying Tigers | 0

- Bold Series winner
- Italics Team with home-court advantage

== Statistics ==
The CBA is like the NCAA, and unlike the NBA, as the CBA combines regular season statistics with playoff statistics, so these lists are not yet final.

=== Statistical leaders – Individual ===
| Category | Player | Team | Average |
|---|---|---|---|
| Points per game | (United States) Pierre Jackson | Beikong Fly Dragons | 39.8 |
| Rebounds per game | (United States) Jason Thompson | Sichuan Blue Whales | 14.9 |
| Assists per game | (United States) Courtney Fortson | Zhejiang Guangsha Lions | 10.9 |
| Steals per game | (Bulgaria) Darius Adams | Xinjiang Flying Tigers | 2.8 |
| Blocks per game | (China) Zhang Zhaoxu | Shanghai Sharks | 2.7 |
| 2FG% (20 games + 4 shots made per game) | (China) Hu Jinqiu | Zhejiang Guangsha Lions | 68.3% |
| 3FG% (20 games + 1 shot made per game) | (China) Du Runwang | Guangdong Southern Tigers | 46.3% |
| FT% (20 games + 2 shots made per game) | (United States) Joe Young | Nanjing Monkey Kings | 91.8% |
| Turnovers per game | (Bulgaria) Darius Adams | Xinjiang Flying Tigers | 4.3 |
| Fouls per game | (China) Li Yuanyu | Jiangsu Dragons | 4.3 |

=== Statistical leaders – Team ===
| Category | Team | Average |
|---|---|---|
| Points per game | Guangdong Southern Tigers | 118.7 |
| Rebounds per game | Liaoning Flying Leopards | 49.0 |
| Assists per game | Zhejiang Guangsha Lions | 24.3 |
| Steals per game | Zhejiang Guangsha Lions | 12.0 |
| Blocks per game | Shanghai Sharks | 4.2 |
| 2FG% | Guangdong Southern Tigers | 58.3% |
| 3FG% | Shenzhen Leopards | 39.8% |
| FT% | Tianjin Gold Lions | 81.3% |
| Turnovers per game (lowest + highest averages) | Jilin Northeast Tigers; Jiangsu Dragons | Fewest (Best): 11.1; Most (Worst): 14.2 |
| Fouls per game (lowest + highest averages) | Shanghai Sharks; Jiangsu Dragons | Fewest (Best): 20.3; Most (Worst): 26.9 |

== Awards ==
=== Yearly awards ===
This is a list of the 2018–19 CBA season's yearly awards winners.

| Award | Recipient(s) | Runner(s)-up/Finalists | Ref. |
|---|---|---|---|
| Domestic Most Valuable Player | (China) Wang Zhelin (Fujian Sturgeons) | (China) Abdusalam Abdurixit (Xinjiang Flying Tigers) (China) Guo Ailun (Liaoning Flying Leopards) (China) Hu Jinqiu (Zhejiang Guangsha Lions) (China) Yi Jianlian (Guangdong Southern Tigers) | |
| International Most Valuable Player | (Bulgaria) Darius Adams (Xinjiang Flying Tigers) | (United States) Jimmer Fredette (Shanghai Sharks) (United States) Aaron Jackson (Beijing Ducks) (United States) Dominique Jones (Jilin Northeast Tigers) (Poland) Maciej Lampe (Jilin Northeast Tigers) | |
| Defensive Player of the Year | (China) Yi Jianlian (Guangdong Southern Tigers) | (Bulgaria) Darius Adams (Xinjiang Flying Tigers) (United States) Brandon Bass (Liaoning Flying Leopards) (United States) Justin Hamilton (Beijing Ducks) (United States) Sonny Weems (Guangdong Southern Tigers) | |
| Most Improved Player | (China) Abdusalam Abdurixit (Xinjiang Flying Tigers) | (China) Shen Zijie (Shenzhen Leopards) (China) Shi Deshuai (Tianjin Gold Lions) | |
| Young Rising Star of the Year | (China) Jiang Yuxing (Jilin Northeast Tigers) | (Chinese Taipei) Chen Ying-chun (Guangzhou Long-Lions) (China) Cheng Shuaipeng (Zhejiang Golden Bulls) | |
| Coach of the Year | (China) Du Feng (Guangdong Southern Tigers) | (China) Adiljan Jun (Xinjiang Flying Tigers) (China) Guo Shiqiang (Liaoning Flying Leopards) (China) Wang Jianjun (Shenzhen Leopards) | |

=== Players of the Week ===
This is a list of the 2018–19 CBA season's Player of the Week award winners.

| Week | Domestic Player of the Week | International Player of the Week | Ref. |
|---|---|---|---|
| 1 | (China) Hu Jinqiu (Zhejiang Guangsha Lions) (1/1) | (United States) Pierre Jackson (Beikong Fly Dragons) (1/2) | |
| 2 | (China) Han Shuo (Bayi Rockets) (1/1) | (United States) Jamaal Franklin (Sichuan Blue Whales) (1/2) | |
| 3 | (China) Zhao Rui (Guangdong Southern Tigers) (1/1) | (Bulgaria) Darius Adams (Xinjiang Flying Tigers) (1/6) | |
| 4 | (China) Yi Jianlian (Guangdong Southern Tigers) (1/4) | (United States) Jared Sullinger (Shenzhen Leopards) (1/1) | |
| 5 | (China) Wang Zhelin (Fujian Sturgeons) (1/4) | (United States) Joe Young (Nanjing Monkey Kings) (1/1) | |
| 6 | (China) Wang Zhelin (Fujian Sturgeons) (2/4) | (United States) Pierre Jackson (Beikong Fly Dragons) (2/2) | |
| 7 | (China) Wang Zhelin (Fujian Sturgeons) (3/4) | (Bulgaria) Darius Adams (Xinjiang Flying Tigers) (2/6) | |
| 8 | (China) Yi Jianlian (Guangdong Southern Tigers) (2/4) | (Bulgaria) Darius Adams (Xinjiang Flying Tigers) (3/6) | |
| 9 | (China) Cheng Shuaipeng (Zhejiang Golden Bulls) (1/1) | (Montenegro) Taylor Rochestie (Tianjin Gold Lions) (1/1) | |
| 10 | (China) Shi Deshuai (Tianjin Gold Lions) (1/1) | (United States) Shabazz Muhammad (Shanxi Loongs) (1/1) | |
| 11 | (China) Guo Ailun (Liaoning Flying Leopards) (1/2) | (Bulgaria) Darius Adams (Xinjiang Flying Tigers) (4/6) | |
| 12 | (China) Yi Jianlian (Guangdong Southern Tigers) (3/4) | (United States) Jamaal Franklin (Sichuan Blue Whales) (2/2) | |
| 13 | (China) Wu Qian (Zhejiang Golden Bulls) (1/1) | (Bulgaria) Darius Adams (Xinjiang Flying Tigers) (5/6) | |
| 14 | (China) Wang Zhelin (Fujian Sturgeons) (4/4) | (United States) Dominique Jones (Jilin Northeast Tigers) (1/1) | |
| 15 | (China) Yi Jianlian (Guangdong Southern Tigers) (4/4) | (Lithuania) Donatas Motiejunas (Shandong Golden Stars) (1/1) | |
| 16 | (China) Guo Ailun (Liaoning Flying Leopards) (2/2) | (Bulgaria) Darius Adams (Xinjiang Flying Tigers) (6/6) | |

=== Players of the Month ===
This is a list of the 2018–19 CBA season's Player of the Month award winners.

| Month | Domestic Player of the Month | International Player of the Month | Ref. |
|---|---|---|---|
| October/November | (China) Hu Jinqiu (Zhejiang Guangsha Lions) (1/1) | (United States) Jimmer Fredette (Shanghai Sharks) (1/1) | |
| December | (China) Wang Zhelin (Fujian Sturgeons) (1/1) | (United States) Pierre Jackson (Beikong Fly Dragons) (1/1) | |
| January | (China) Yi Jianlian (Guangdong Southern Tigers) (1/1) | (United States) Dominique Jones (Jilin Northeast Tigers) (1/1) | |
| February/March | (China) Guo Ailun (Liaoning Flying Leopards) (1/1) | (Lithuania) Donatas Motiejunas (Shandong Golden Stars) (1/1) | |

=== Young Rising Stars of the Month ===
This is a list of the 2018–19 CBA season's Young Rising Star of the Month award winners.

| Month | Young Rising Star of the Month | Ref. |
|---|---|---|
| October/November | (China) Shen Zijie (Shenzhen Leopards) (1/1) | |
| December | (China) Jiang Yuxing (Jilin Northeast Tigers) (1/1) | |
| January | (China) Cheng Shuaipeng (Zhejiang Golden Bulls) (1/1) | |
| February/March | | |

== All-Star Weekend ==
The 24th CBA All-Star Game and associated events were held in Qingdao on January 12–13, 2019. Saturday featured the Rising Stars Challenge, in which a team of CBA Rookies & Sophomores faced a squad of students from the Chinese University Basketball Association, as well as the preliminaries of the Slam Dunk Contest, Three-Point Shootout, and Skills Competition. Sunday featured the All-Star Game, with the North hosting the South, and the finals of the three individual events taking place at halftime.

Winners from 24th annual Chinese Basketball Association All-Star Game & Weekend
| 2018–19 CBA All-Star Game | CBA South All-Stars defeated CBA North All-Stars 160–145 | | |
| 2018–19 CBA All-Star Game MVP | (United States) Joe Young | Nanjing Monkey Kings | Key Statistics: 40 points & 6 assists |
| Slam Dunk Contest | (China) Zhang Jianhao | Guangdong University of Technology | Final Result: 79 combined points from judges |
| Three-Point Shootout | (China) Chen Linjian | Fujian Sturgeons | Final Result: 21 points in last round & 11 in tiebreaker |
| Skills Competition | (China) Jiang Weize | Jilin Northeast Tigers | Final Result: 26.5 seconds (new record) |
| 2018–19 CBA Rising Stars Challenge | CUBA Students defeated CBA Rookies & Sophomores 90–88 | | |
| 2018–19 CBA Rising Stars Challenge MVP | (China) Wang Shaojie | Peking University | Key Statistics: 13 points & 10 rebounds |
