= 2019 CBA Playoffs =

The 2019 CBA Playoffs was the postseason tournament of the Chinese Basketball Association's 2018–19 season. It began on 16 March 2019. In this season, the playoffs was expanded from 10 teams to 12 teams.

== Bracket ==
First round Best-of-three
8	Shandong Golden Stars	0
9	Jiangsu Dragons	2
5	Beijing Ducks	2
12	Shanghai Sharks	0
6	Zhejiang Lions	2
11	Zhejiang Golden Bulls	1
7	Fujian Sturgeons	2
10	Jilin Northeast Tigers	0

Quarterfinals; Best-of-five
1	Guangdong Southern Tigers	3
9	Jiangsu Dragons	0
4	Shenzhen Leopards	3
5	Beijing Ducks	2
3	Xinjiang Flying Tigers	3
6	Zhejiang Lions	1
2	Liaoning Flying Leopards	3
7	Fujian Sturgeons	0

Semifinals; Best-of-seven
1	Guangdong Southern Tigers	4
4	Shenzhen Leopards	0
3	Xinjiang Flying Tigers	4
2	Liaoning Flying Leopards	1

Finals; Best-of-seven
1	Guangdong Southern Tigers	4
3	Xinjiang Flying Tigers	0

- Bold Series winner
- Italics Team with home-court advantage

== First round ==
All times are in China standard time (UTC+8)

=== (5) Beijing Ducks vs. (12) Shanghai Sharks ===
16 March 2019
19:35

Boxscore

Beijing Ducks	110–97	Shanghai Sharks
Scoring by quarter: 21–21, 33–24, 29–32, 27–20
Beijing leads series, 1–0

Cadillac Arena, Beijing

19 March 2019
19:35

Boxscore

Shanghai Sharks	103–117	Beijing Ducks
Scoring by quarter: 18–26, 29–33, 22–33, 34–25
Beijing wins series, 2–0

Pudong Yuanshen Gymnasium, Shanghai

=== (6) Zhejiang Lions vs. (11) Zhejiang Golden Bulls ===
16 March 2019
19:35

Boxscore

Zhejiang Lions	117–125	Zhejiang Golden Bulls
Scoring by quarter: 28–28, 25–27, 38–38, 26–32
Zhejiang Golden Bulls leads series, 1–0

Zhuji Sports Centre Gymnasium, Zhuji, Zhejiang

19 March 2019
19:35

Boxscore

Zhejiang Golden Bulls	110–113	Zhejiang Lions
Scoring by quarter: 30–34, 22–27, 31–25, 27–27
Series tied, 1–1

Binjiang Gymnasium, Hangzhou, Zhejiang

22 March 2019
19:35

Boxscore

Zhejiang Lions	103–90	Zhejiang Golden Bulls
Scoring by quarter: 25–22, 19–22, 33–21, 26–25
Zhejiang Lions wins series, 2–1

Zhuji Sports Centre Gymnasium, Zhuji, Zhejiang

=== (7) Fujian Sturgeons vs. (10) Jilin Northeast Tigers ===
17 March 2019
19:35

Boxscore

Fujian Sturgeons	111–105	Jilin Northeast Tigers
Scoring by quarter: 30–24, 34–22, 28–37, 19–22
Fujian leads series, 1–0

Zuchang Gymnasium, Jinjiang, Fujian

20 March 2019
19:35

Boxscore

Jilin Northeast Tigers	95–110	Fujian Sturgeons
Scoring by quarter: 26–31, 26–34, 31–21, 12–24
Fujian wins series, 2–0

Changchun Gymnasium, Changchun, Jilin

=== (8) Shandong Golden Stars vs. (9) Jiangsu Dragons ===
17 March 2019
19:35

Boxscore

Shandong Golden Stars	101–103	Jiangsu Dragons
Scoring by quarter: 27–19, 32–25, 26–32, 16–27
Jiangsu leads series, 1–0

Shandong Arena, Jinan, Shandong

20 March 2019
19:35

Boxscore

Jiangsu Dragons	113–105	Shandong Golden Stars
Scoring by quarter: 26–28, 36–21, 20–30, 31–26
Jiangsu wins series, 2–0

Suzhou Sports Center Gymnasium, Suzhou, Jiangsu

== Quarterfinals ==
=== (1) Guangdong Southern Tigers vs. (9) Jiangsu Dragons ===
25 March 2019
19:35

Boxscore

Guangdong Southern Tigers	137–108	Jiangsu Dragons
Scoring by quarter: 31–20, 36–30, 41–29, 29–29
Guangdong leads series, 1–0

Dongfeng Nissan Cultural and Sports Centre, Dongguan, Guangdong

27 March 2019
19:35

Boxscore

Guangdong Southern Tigers	141–99	Jiangsu Dragons
Scoring by quarter: 35–20, 39–21, 46–21, 21–37
Guangdong leads series, 2–0

Dongfeng Nissan Cultural and Sports Centre, Dongguan, Guangdong

30 March 2019
19:35

Boxscore

Jiangsu Dragons	108–135	Guangdong Southern Tigers
Scoring by quarter: 17–30, 23–36, 35–32, 33–37
Guangdong wins series, 3–0

Suzhou Sports Center Gymnasium, Suzhou, Jiangsu

=== (2) Liaoning Flying Leopards vs. (7) Fujian Sturgeons ===
26 March 2019
19:35

Boxscore

Liaoning Flying Leopards	124–118 (OT)	Fujian Sturgeons
Scoring by quarter: 28–19, 26–23, 23–32, 26–29, Overtime: 12–12, 9–3
Liaoning leads series, 1–0

Shenyang Gymnasium, Shenyang, Liaoning

28 March 2019
19:35

Boxscore

Liaoning Flying Leopards	115–95	Fujian Sturgeons
Scoring by quarter: 24–26, 29–21, 37–22, 25–26
Liaoning leads series, 2–0

Shenyang Gymnasium, Shenyang, Liaoning

31 March 2019
19:35

Boxscore

Fujian Sturgeons	102–106	Liaoning Flying Leopards
Scoring by quarter: 21–18, 27–36, 35–32, 19–20
Liaoning wins series, 3–0

Zuchang Gymnasium, Jinjiang, Fujian

=== (3) Xinjiang Flying Tigers vs. (6) Zhejiang Lions ===
26 March 2019
19:35

Boxscore

Xinjiang Flying Tigers	134–100	Zhejiang Lions
Scoring by quarter: 27–21, 36–29, 26–25, 45–25
Xinjiang leads series, 1–0

Hongshan Arena, Ürümqi, Xinjiang

28 March 2019
19:35

Boxscore

Xinjiang Flying Tigers	139–125	Zhejiang Lions
Scoring by quarter: 39–35, 34–27, 33–38, 33–25
Xinjiang leads series, 2–0

Hongshan Arena, Ürümqi, Xinjiang

31 March 2019
19:35

Boxscore

Zhejiang Lions	120–112	Xinjiang Flying Tigers
Scoring by quarter: 29–29, 25–32, 38–25, 28–26
Xinjiang leads series, 2–1

Zhuji Sports Centre Gymnasium, Zhuji, Zhejiang

2 April 2019
19:35

Boxscore

Zhejiang Lions	95–111	Xinjiang Flying Tigers
Scoring by quarter: 17–30, 31–27, 17–34, 30–20
Xinjiang wins series, 3–1

Zhuji Sports Centre Gymnasium, Zhuji, Zhejiang

=== (4) Shenzhen Leopards vs. (5) Beijing Ducks ===
25 March 2019
19:35

Boxscore

Shenzhen Leopards	96–106	Beijing Ducks
Scoring by quarter: 20–32, 33–18, 23–25, 20–31
Beijing leads series, 1–0

Shenzhen Universiade Sports Centre, Shenzhen, Guangdong

27 March 2019
19:35

Boxscore

Shenzhen Leopards	88–104	Beijing Ducks
Scoring by quarter: 22–24, 27–29, 22–24, 17–27
Beijing leads series, 2–0

Shenzhen Universiade Sports Centre, Shenzhen, Guangdong

30 March 2019
19:35

Boxscore

Beijing Ducks	110–116 (OT)	Shenzhen Leopards
Scoring by quarter: 29–23, 27–32, 22–27, 24–20, Overtime: 8–14
Beijing leads series, 2–1

Cadillac Arena, Beijing

1 April 2019
19:35

Boxscore

Beijing Ducks	83–94	Shenzhen Leopards
Scoring by quarter: 14–19, 21–19, 25–29, 23–27
Series tied, 2–2

Cadillac Arena, Beijing

4 April 2019
19:35

Boxscore

Shenzhen Leopards	118–107	Beijing Ducks
Scoring by quarter: 24–18, 26–40, 38–23, 30–26
Shenzhen wins series, 3–2

Shenzhen Universiade Sports Centre, Shenzhen, Guangdong

== Semifinals ==
=== (1) Guangdong Southern Tigers vs. (4) Shenzhen Leopards ===
8 April 2019
19:35

Boxscore

Guangdong Southern Tigers	141–118	Shenzhen Leopards
Scoring by quarter: 45–23, 32–28, 34–29, 30–38
Guangdong leads series, 1–0

Dongfeng Nissan Cultural and Sports Centre, Dongguan, Guangdong

10 April 2019
19:35

Boxscore

Guangdong Southern Tigers	119–112	Shenzhen Leopards
Scoring by quarter: 31–19, 30–29, 40–35, 18–29
Guangdong leads series, 2–0

Dongfeng Nissan Cultural and Sports Centre, Dongguan, Guangdong

13 April 2019
19:35

Boxscore

Shenzhen Leopards	106–111	Guangdong Southern Tigers
Scoring by quarter: 23–34, 25–25, 30–30, 28–22
Guangdong leads series, 3–0

Shenzhen Universiade Sports Centre, Shenzhen, Guangdong

15 April 2019
19:35

Boxscore

Shenzhen Leopards	117–135	Guangdong Southern Tigers
Scoring by quarter: 27–30, 30–35, 29–43, 31–27
Guangdong wins series, 4–0

Shenzhen Universiade Sports Centre, Shenzhen, Guangdong

=== (2) Liaoning Flying Leopards vs. (3) Xinjiang Flying Tigers ===
9 April 2019
19:35

Boxscore

Liaoning Flying Leopards	95–97	Xinjiang Flying Tigers
Scoring by quarter: 21–22, 21–29, 26–25, 27–21
Xinjiang leads series, 1–0

Shenyang Gymnasium, Shenyang, Liaoning

11 April 2019
19:35

Boxscore

Liaoning Flying Leopards	100–109	Xinjiang Flying Tigers
Scoring by quarter: 27–23, 27–25, 28–36, 18–25
Xinjiang leads series, 2–0

Shenyang Gymnasium, Shenyang, Liaoning

14 April 2019
19:35

Boxscore

Xinjiang Flying Tigers	100–109	Liaoning Flying Leopards
Scoring by quarter: 27–25, 28–21, 27–36, 18–27
Xinjiang leads series, 2–1

Hongshan Arena, Ürümqi, Xinjiang

16 April 2019
19:35

Boxscore

Xinjiang Flying Tigers	107–81	Liaoning Flying Leopards
Scoring by quarter: 28–20, 22–17, 27–22, 30–22
Xinjiang leads series, 3–1

Hongshan Arena, Ürümqi, Xinjiang

18 April 2019
19:35

Boxscore

Xinjiang Flying Tigers	99–62	Liaoning Flying Leopards
Scoring by quarter: 26–19, 20–15, 27–9, 26–19
Xinjiang wins series, 4–1

Hongshan Arena, Ürümqi, Xinjiang

== Finals ==
=== (1) Guangdong Southern Tigers vs. (3) Xinjiang Flying Tigers ===
26 April 2019
19:35

Boxscore

Guangdong Southern Tigers	142–123	Xinjiang Flying Tigers
Scoring by quarter: 42–33, 33–28, 35–26, 32–36
Guangdong leads series, 1–0

Dongfeng Nissan Cultural and Sports Centre, Dongguan, Guangdong

28 April 2019
19:35

Boxscore

Guangdong Southern Tigers	116–97	Xinjiang Flying Tigers
Scoring by quarter: 32–30, 34–21, 19–20, 31–26
Guangdong leads series, 2–0

Dongfeng Nissan Cultural and Sports Centre, Dongguan, Guangdong

1 May 2019
19:35

Boxscore

Xinjiang Flying Tigers	118–128	Guangdong Southern Tigers
Scoring by quarter: 32–31, 35–29, 23–33, 28–35
Guangdong leads series, 3–0

Hongshan Arena, Ürümqi, Xinjiang

3 May 2019
19:35

Boxscore

Xinjiang Flying Tigers	98–103	Guangdong Southern Tigers
Scoring by quarter: 19–23, 22–21, 36–30, 21–29
Guangdong wins series, 4–0

Hongshan Arena, Ürümqi, Xinjiang
