= Donatas Motiejūnas =

Lithuanian basketball player (born 1990)

- Motiejūnas with PAOK Thessaloniki in 2026

No. 20 – PAOK Thessaloniki
- Position: Center / power forward
- League: Greek Basketball League; EuroCup

Personal information
- Born: September 20, 1990 (age 36) Kaunas, Lithuanian Republic
- Listed height: 2.13 m (7 ft 0 in)
- Listed weight: 117 kg (258 lb)

Career information
- NBA draft: 2011: 1st round, 20th overall pick
- Drafted by: Minnesota Timberwolves
- Playing career: 2005–present

Career history
- 2005–2009: Žalgiris
- 2005–2008: →Žalgiris -Arvydas Sabonis School
- 2008–2009: →Aisčiai
- 2009–2012: Benetton Basket
- 2011–2012: →Asseco Prokom
- 2012–2016: Houston Rockets
- 2012–2013; 2016: →Rio Grande Valley Vipers
- 2017: New Orleans Pelicans
- 2017–2019: Shandong Golden Stars
- 2019: San Antonio Spurs
- 2019–2020: Shanghai Sharks
- 2020–2021: Xinjiang Flying Tigers
- 2021–2026: AS Monaco
- 2025–2026: →Crvena zvezda
- 2026–present: PAOK Thessaloniki

Career highlights
- 2× LNB Pro A champion (2023, 2024); French Cup winner (2023); All-LNB Pro A Second Team (2023); All-CBA Foreign First Team (2021); CBA rebounding champion (2021); Polish League champion (2012); EuroCup Rising Star (2011); Lithuanian League All-Star (2009); LKL Most Improved Player (2009); LKL champion (2008); Lithuanian Cup winner (2008); Baltic League champion (2008); Nike Hoop Summit (2009); FIBA Europe Under-18 Championship MVP (2008); Nike International Junior Tournament MVP (2007)
- Stats at NBA.com
- Stats at Basketball Reference
Medals
Men's basketball
Representing Lithuania
EuroBasket
Silver medal – second place	2013 Slovenia
U20 European Championship
Silver medal – second place	2008 Latvia
U18 European Championship
Silver medal – second place	2008 Greece

Donatas Motiejūnas (Lithuanian pronunciation: [dɔˈnaːtɐs moːtʲiəˈjûːnɐs]; born September 20, 1990) is a Lithuanian professional basketball player for PAOK Thessaloniki of the Greek Basketball League (GBL) and the EuroCup. He was drafted 20th overall in the 2011 NBA draft by the Minnesota Timberwolves who traded his rights to the Houston Rockets. After spending four seasons with the Rockets from 2012 to 2016, Motiejūnas joined the New Orleans Pelicans in 2017, and the San Antonio Spurs in 2019.

== Professional career ==
=== Žalgiris (2005–2008) ===
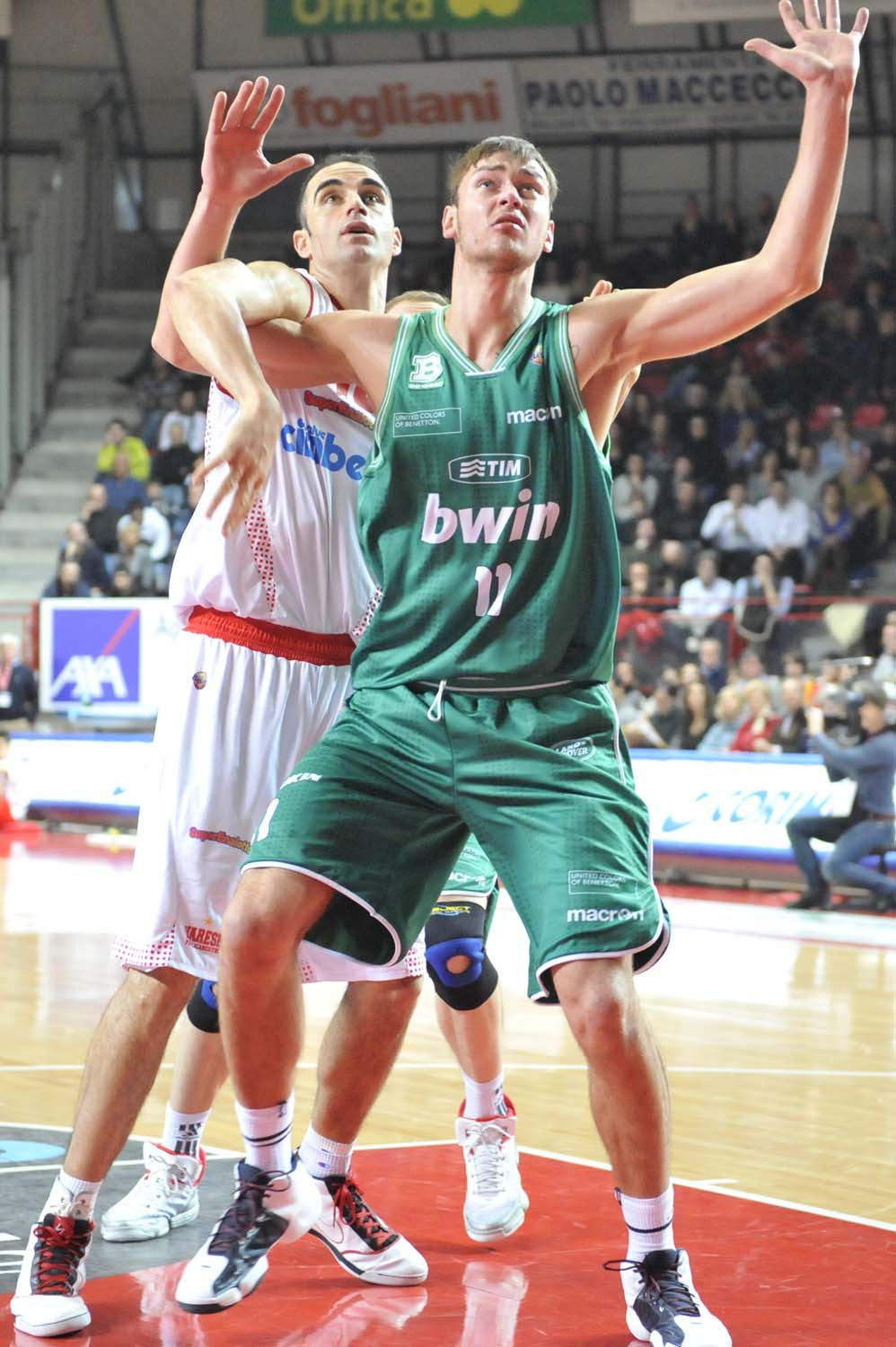
Motiejūnas (front) with Benetton Basket in 2011

In 2005, Motiejūnas began his career playing with Žalgiris Kaunas junior team, Žalgiris-Arvydas Sabonis school, who played in Lithuania's second-tier National Basketball League. In 2007–08, he made his debut for the senior team in a Baltic Basketball League (BBL) game against the ASK Riga. He scored 15 points in 22 minutes.

=== Aisčiai (2008–2009) ===
In 2008, Motiejūnas was loaned to Aisčiai for the 2008–09 season where he went on to average 19.9 points and 7.0 rebounds in 29.3 minutes per game, and he scored a season-high 29 points in a Lithuanian League game against Nevėžis on March 22, 2009.

In April 2009, Motiejūnas participated in the Nike Hoop Summit and on 14 April 2009 scored 21 points for the Team World which defeated 97–89 Team USA.

=== Benetton Basket (2009–2011) ===
In August 2009, Motiejūnas signed a multi-year deal with Benetton Basket of Italy's Lega Basket Serie A. In 33 league games in 2009–10, he averaged 9.8 points and 5.2 rebounds per game.

In April 2010, Motiejūnas declared for the 2010 NBA draft, but later withdrew and returned to Benetton. He went on to win the 2011 EuroCup Rising Star award after helping Benetton reach Eurocup's 2011 Final Four, averaging 10.9 points and 5.6 rebounds per game.

=== Asseco Prokom (2011–2012) ===
On June 23, 2011, Motiejūnas was selected with the 20th overall pick in the 2011 NBA draft by the Minnesota Timberwolves. The next day, his rights were traded, along with Jonny Flynn, to the Houston Rockets in exchange for Brad Miller and the draft rights to the 23rd overall pick, Nikola Mirotić. Due to the NBA lockout, Motiejūnas returned to Europe.

On September 22, 2011, Benetton loaned Motiejūnas to Asseco Prokom for the 2011–12 season. On December 7, 2011, he recorded a career-high 21 rebounds (18 defensive) against Union Olimpija, the most defensive rebounds in a EuroLeague game since the 2000–01 season. He also helped lead Asseco Prokom to a ninth consecutive Polish Basketball League title in 2011–12. During the seventh and final game of the finals, he recorded 23 points and 11 rebounds.

=== Houston Rockets (2012–2016) ===
==== 2012–13 season ====
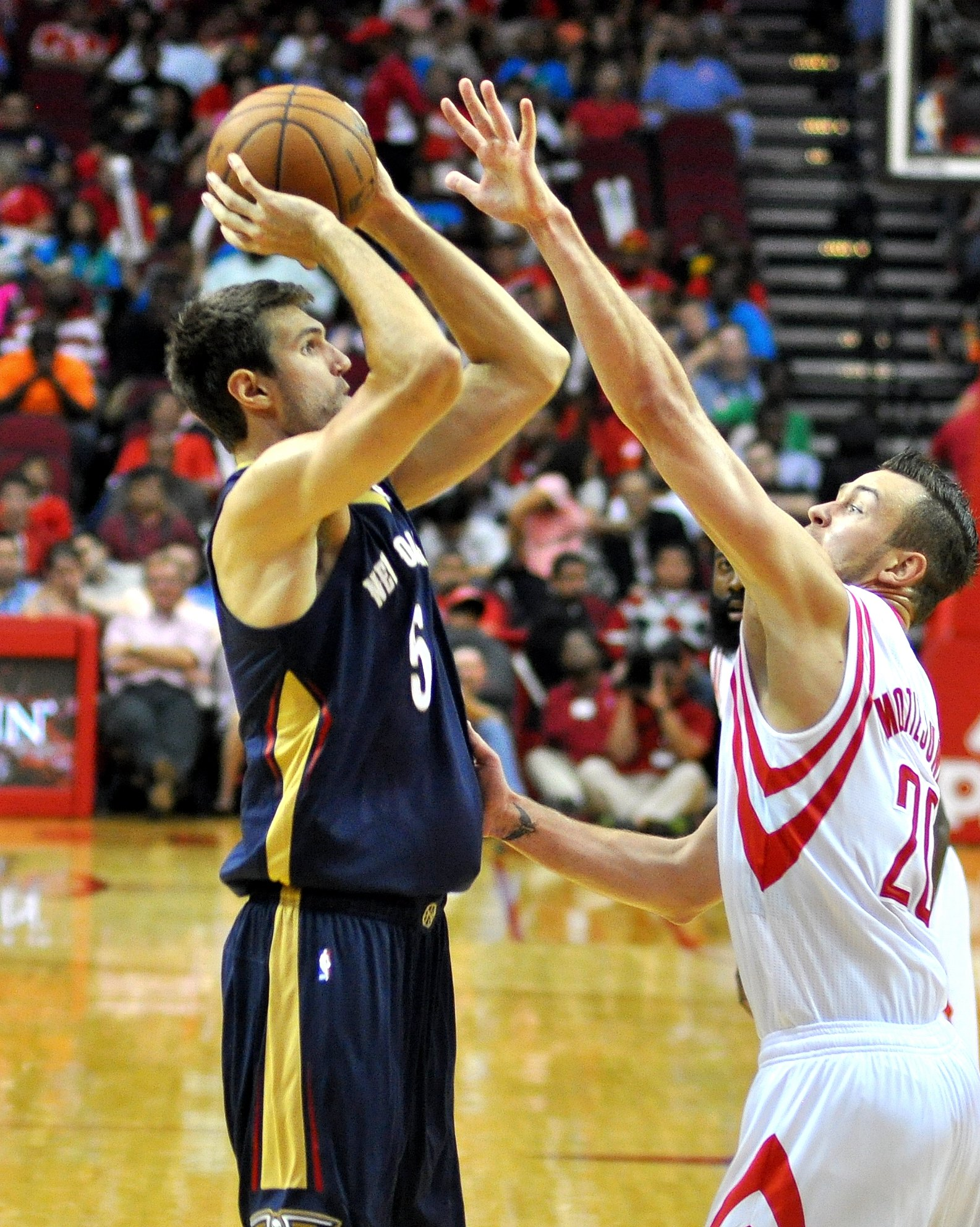
Motiejūnas defending Jeff Withey in October 2013

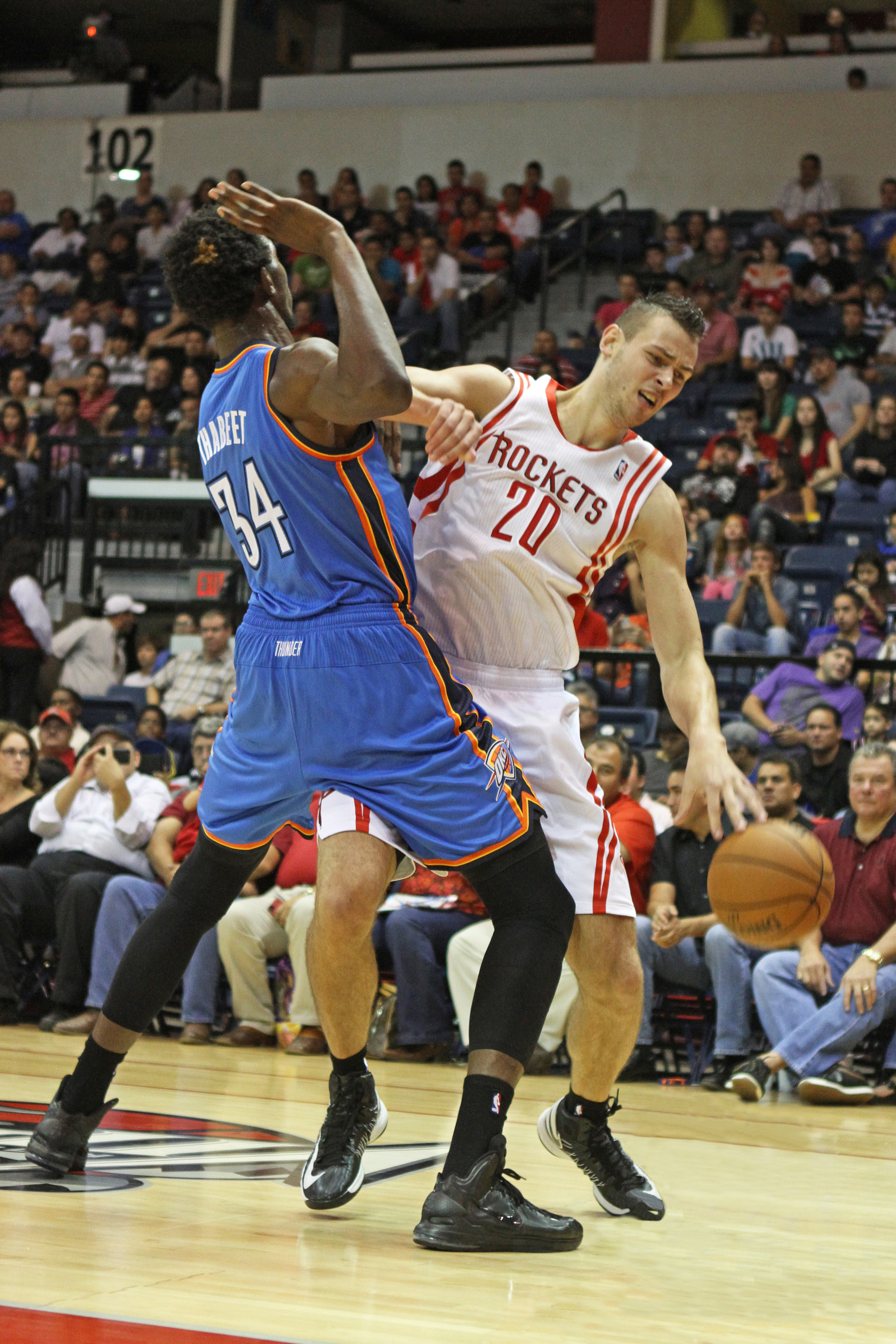
Motiejūnas versus Hasheem Thabeet in October 2012

On July 6, 2012, Motiejūnas signed a four-year, rookie scale contract with the Houston Rockets, and joined them for the 2012 NBA Summer League. In his summer league debut, he recorded 25 points, 9 rebounds, 2 assists, 2 steals and 1 block. After the game, he quoted a famous Lithuanian idiom describing his debut: "Jeigu bijai vilko – neik į mišką" (English: If you're scared of wolves, do not go into the woods). Overall, he averaged 16.3 points and 7.8 rebounds in four games.

On November 14, 2012, Motiejūnas was assigned to Houston's NBA Development League (NBA D-League) affiliate, the Rio Grande Valley Vipers. In his D-League debut on November 23, he recorded 31 points, 8 rebounds, 3 assists and 1 steals. Two days later, he was recalled by the Rockets. He was later reassigned two more times throughout the season and in seven D-League games, he averaged 20.3 points, 9.7 rebounds and 3.0 assists per game. In 44 games for the Rockets, he averaged 5.7 points and 2.1 rebounds per game.

==== 2013–14 season ====
On October 30, 2013, the Rockets exercised their third-year team option on Motiejūnas' rookie scale contract, extending the contract through the 2014–15 season. He went on to play 62 games for the Rockets while averaging 5.5 points and 3.6 rebounds per game.

==== 2014–15 season ====
In August 2014, Motiejūnas came under fire for comments made about his Rocket teammates James Harden and Dwight Howard, describing their relationship as "Hi & bye. They even eat separately from the team. Usually in some fast food place." The comments came in an interview with Lithuanian media. It was later revealed that Motiejūnas was misquoted in his comments due to an incorrect translation by Lithuanian media from Lithuanian to English.

On October 30, 2014, the Rockets exercised their fourth-year team option on Motiejūnas' rookie scale contract, extending the contract through the 2015–16 season. With Dwight Howard out for a 11 games during November and December, and Terrence Jones out for the majority of the first half of the season, Motiejūnas averaged 14.3 points and 7.1 rebounds per game in Howard's 11-game absence. After Howard's return on December 13, Motiejūnas scored a then career-high 25 points on 11-of-19 shooting to help the Rockets defeat the Denver Nuggets 108–96.

On January 30, 2015, Motiejūnas scored a career-high 26 points in a 93–87 win over the Boston Celtics. On March 27, he was ruled out for one to two weeks with lower back pain and tightness. However, the injury later ruled him out for the rest of the season, and put his chances of playing for the Lithuanian national team in doubt.

In his third NBA season, Motiejūnas led the league in post-up field goal percentage (53.4%), with his biggest competitor being fellow Lithuanian Jonas Valančiūnas of the Toronto Raptors (51.3%). In recognition, Jonathan Feigen of the Houston Chronicle awarded Motiejūnas an "A" grade for his 2014–15 season performance.

==== 2015–16 season ====
On December 1, 2015, Motiejūnas was cleared to return to practice, having been out since March 2015 after requiring surgery to repair a herniated disk in his back. Four days later, he returned to the Rockets' lineup and made his season debut, earning a standing ovation when he entered the game for the first time during the first quarter of the team's 120–113 win over the Sacramento Kings. He had one rebound and took a charge in six minutes of play. He played in 14 straight games for the Rockets, including making one start, before more back pain forced him out again. He subsequently missed all of January's action, and on January 30, he was assigned to the Rio Grande Valley Vipers for the first time since 2013 to complete his rehab from the back injury. He later received two more assignments to the Vipers.

On February 18, 2016, Motiejūnas and Marcus Thornton were traded to the Detroit Pistons in a three-team trade involving the Rockets and the Philadelphia 76ers. However, four days later, the Pistons rescinded their trade following a failed physical by Motiejūnas. On February 27, Motiejūnas returned to the Rockets' lineup and played for the first time since December 31. The Rockets finished the 2015–16 regular season as the eighth seed in the Western Conference with a 41–41 record. In the first round of the 2016 playoffs, the Rockets faced the first-seeded Golden State Warriors, and in a game 3 win on April 21, Motiejūnas recorded 14 points and 13 rebounds for his first career double-double in the postseason.

=== New Orleans Pelicans (2017) ===
After the 2015–16 season, Motiejūnas became a restricted free agent. On December 2, 2016, following a prolonged contract dispute with the Rockets that lasted into the first month of the 2016–17 season, he received a four-year, $37 million offer sheet from the Brooklyn Nets, which the Rockets matched three days later. A day after the Rockets matched his four-year offer sheet to retain him, Motiejūnas did not show up for his scheduled physical exam with the team. Motiejūnas' camp made the decision to not report to the Rockets because of a difference of nearly $6 million from the offer sheet he signed with the Nets; the Rockets only had to match the principle terms of the offer sheet, which came to $31 million. As a result, on December 9, the two sides negotiated a new four-year, partially guaranteed deal worth between $35 million and $37 million with bonus clauses. While they appeared to have a new deal in place, Motiejūnas was sent home before the team's game on December 10 after taking a physical, and five days later, the Rockets renounced the four-year deal and their rights to Motiejūnas, allowing him to become an unrestricted free agent.

On January 3, 2017, Motiejūnas signed with the New Orleans Pelicans. He made his debut for the Pelicans four days later, recording 11 points and five rebounds in 20 minutes off the bench in a 117–108 loss to the Boston Celtics. An unexpected trade during the All-Star break for DeMarcus Cousins led to a diminishing role for Motiejūnas. He initially appeared in 21 consecutive games after signing with New Orleans, but from February 25 through April 4, he did not play in 11 out of a 20-game span.

=== Shandong Golden Stars (2017–2019) ===
On August 9, 2017, Motiejūnas signed a one-year, $2.2 million contract with the Shandong Golden Stars of the Chinese Basketball Association (CBA). It was reported that he was the highest-paid foreigner of the whole league. On February 1, 2018, Motiejūnas recorded a triple-double leading his team to an important 127–103 victory versus the Jiangsu Dragons by recording 29 points, 15 rebounds and 10 assists. On March 13, Motiejūnas began the 2018 CBA Playoffs with 24 points, seven rebounds and a 104–100 victory versus the Jiangsu Dragons. His team defeated Jiangsu Dragons 3–0 in the first round after their third 127–104 victory during which Motiejūnas scored 29 points and grabbed 13 rebounds. In the semifinals, they faced the Zhejiang Lions, which offered a much higher competition. His team tied the series 2–2 after Motiejūnas' solid contribution of 35 points (a career-high in China) and 14 rebounds versus his direct opponent Ioannis Bourousis. Despite his yet another good performance of 31 points, 13 rebounds, two blocks and one assist, his team was eliminated in the series 4–3 after an 105–95 loss in game 7.

On November 8, 2018, Motiejūnas achieved his career rebounds record by grabbing 25 rebounds and scoring 24 points that led his team to a 100–82 victory versus the Jiangsu Dragons. Less than a week later, on November 13, he improved his rebounds record once again by scoring 32 points and grabbing 32 rebounds, while his team defeated the Shanghai Sharks 99–96.

On March 3, 2019, Motiejūnas scored a career-high 43 points, along with 17 rebounds and six assists, and led his team to an 122–83 victory. Despite a good 2018–19 regular season, during which he averaged 27.3 points, 14 rebounds, 4.2 assists and 1.8 steals, his team was eliminated in the first round of the 2019 CBA Playoffs, after losing 113–105 to the Jiangsu Dragons on March 20.

=== San Antonio Spurs (2019) ===
On April 4, 2019, Motiejūnas signed with the San Antonio Spurs. He declined to sign a new contract with the Spurs because China's Shanghai Sharks offered a more valuable deal.

=== Shanghai Sharks (2019–2020) ===
On August 27, 2019, Motiejūnas signed a $6 million contract with CBA's Shanghai Sharks. On June 9, 2020, it was reported that Motiejūnas had parted ways with the Shanghai Sharks. In 28 games during the 2019–20 season, he averaged 22.8 points, a league-leading 15.1 rebounds, 3.5 assists, 1.8 steals and 0.5 blocks per game in 36.7 minutes of average playing time.

=== Xinjiang Flying Tigers (2020–2021) ===
On September 17, 2020, Motiejūnas signed in China with the Xinjiang Flying Tigers.

=== AS Monaco (2021–2025) ===
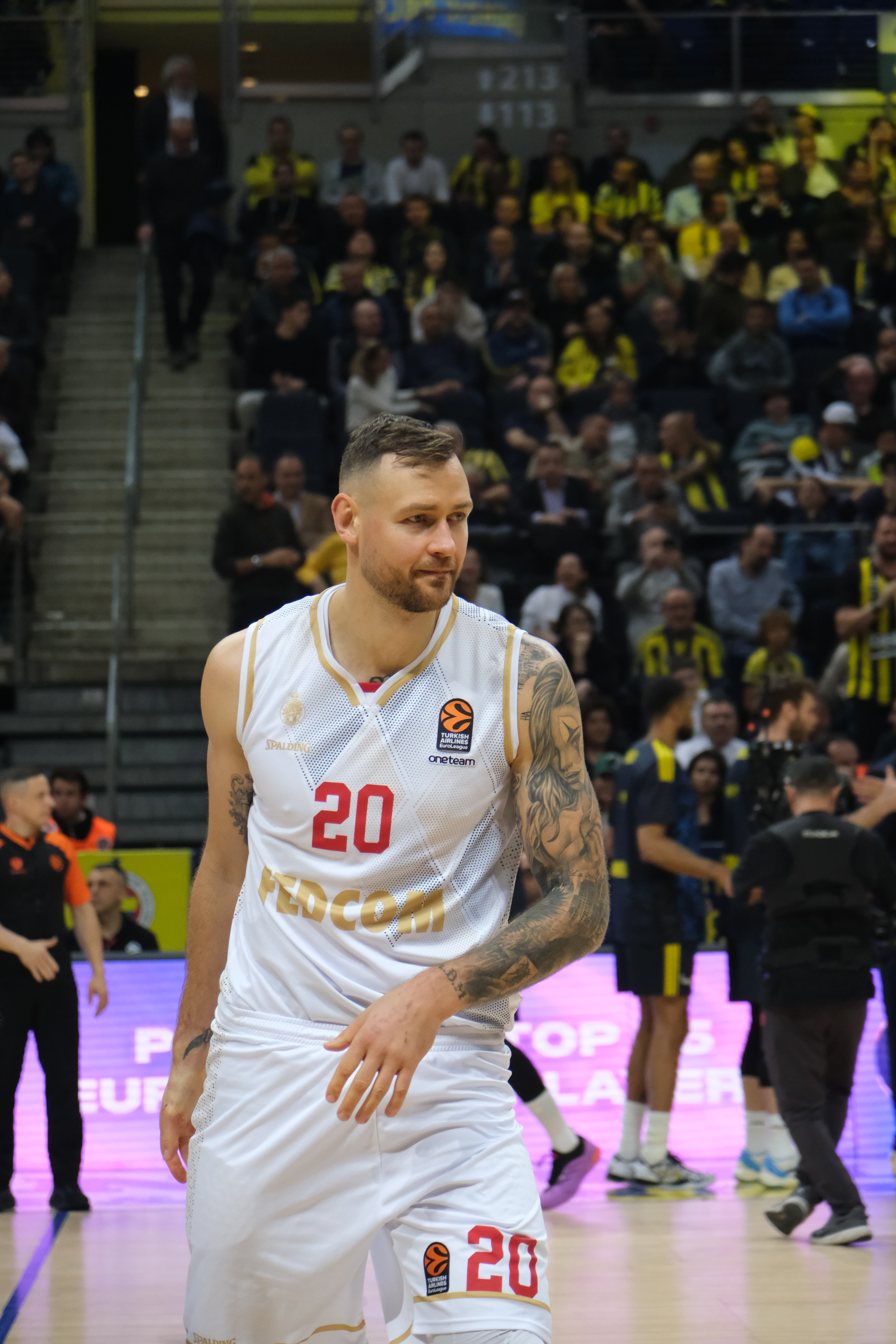
Motiejūnas with AS Monaco in 2024

On August 18, 2021, Motiejūnas signed with AS Monaco. On July 21, 2023, he renewed his contract with Monaco through 2025.

==== Loan to Crvena zvezda (2025–2026) ====
On October 2, 2025, he joined Crvena zvezda on loan from AS Monaco for a three-month deal. On December 2, he extended his contract until the end of the season.

=== PAOK Thessaloniki (2026–present) ===
On October 4, 2026, Motiejūnas signed a one-year deal with PAOK Thessaloniki of the Greek Basketball League (GBL).

== National team career ==
Motiejūnas with the Lithuania men's national basketball team in 2026

Motiejūnas represented Lithuania's national teams in international tournaments.

Motiejūnas led Lithuania under-18 team to the silver medal at the 2008 FIBA U18 European Championship. Despite losing to Greece in the gold medal game, he was named the most valuable player (MVP) of the tournament, after averaging 18.2 points, 10.2 rebounds and 1.8 blocks per game. At the 2008 FIBA U20 European Championship, he averaged 11.2 points and 5.4 rebounds per game.

Motiejūnas won a silver medal with Lithuania senior team at EuroBasket 2013 tournament and went on to compete for the national team at the 2014 FIBA Basketball World Cup, where he averaged 7.4 points and 4.0 rebounds in nine games.

In June 2015, Motiejūnas ruled himself out of EuroBasket 2015 to continue recovering from a back injury he sustained while playing for the Houston Rockets.

== Personal life ==
Motiejūnas has a large tattoo on his chest of an eagle clutching a basketball. He explained, "I really like the attitudes of eagles. They never give up. When they grab a fish or something else, they never let it go." Motiejūnas is a fan of FC Bayern Munich and Germany national football team.

== Career statistics ==
Legend
GP	Games played	GS	Games started	MPG	Minutes per game
FG%	Field-goal percentage	3P%	3-point field-goal percentage	FT%	Free-throw percentage
RPG	Rebounds per game	APG	Assists per game	SPG	Steals per game
BPG	Blocks per game	PPG	Points per game	PIR	Performance index rating
**Bold**	Career high	*	Led the league

=== NBA ===
==== Regular season ====
Year	Team	GP	GS	MPG	FG%	3P%	FT%	RPG	APG	SPG	BPG	PPG
2012–13	Houston	44	14	12.2	.455	.289	.627	2.1	.7	.2	.2	5.7
2013–14	Houston	62	3	15.4	.443	.250	.604	3.6	.5	.3	.3	5.5
2014–15	Houston	**71**	**62**	**28.7**	**.504**	**.368**	.602	**5.9**	**1.8**	**.8**	**.5**	**12.0**
2015–16	Houston	37	22	14.8	.439	.281	**.642**	2.9	1.1	.5	.1	6.2
2016–17	New Orleans	34	0	14.1	.413	.234	.510	3.0	1.0	.5	.3	4.4
2018–19	San Antonio	3	0	4.3	.500	—	.000	1.0	.3	.0	.3	2.0
Career		251	101	18.2	.469	.300	.597	3.8	1.1	.5	.3	7.3

==== Playoffs ====
Year	Team	GP	GS	MPG	FG%	3P%	FT%	RPG	APG	SPG	BPG	PPG
2013	Houston	1	0	5.0	**1.000**	—	**1.000**	1.0	—	—	—	5.0
2016	Houston	**5**	**4**	**19.6**	.432	**.444**	.471	**5.2**	**1.0**	**.8**	**.4**	**8.8**
2019	San Antonio	**5**	0	3.8	.600	.000	.500	1.4	.4	—	—	2.6
Career		11	4	11.1	.490	.400	.500	3.1	.6	.4	.2	5.6

=== EuroLeague ===
Year	Team	GP	GS	MPG	FG%	3P%	FT%	RPG	APG	SPG	BPG	PPG	PIR
2007–08	Žalgiris	3	0	7.2	.200	.000	**1.000**	2.7	—	—	—	1.3	1.3
2011–12	Asseco Prokom	10	10	**31.3**	.436	.304	.455	**7.9**	**.9**	**.6**	**.8**	**12.5**	**13.7**
2021–22	AS Monaco	38	34	19.5	.572	.327	.447	4.6	.7	.5	.3	9.7	10.8
2022–23	AS Monaco	**41***	**37**	17.8	.573	.250	.558	3.7	.8	.3	.1	8.5	10.0
2023–24	AS Monaco	39	32	17.7	.550	.377	.727	3.4	**.9**	.4	.2	8.8	10.1
2024–25	AS Monaco	29	24	14.7	.576	**.474**	.534	3.1	**.9**	.3	.3	6.4	7.5
2025–26	Crvena zvezda	27	25	12.5	**.596**	.357	.597	1.8	.8	.3	—	6.1	7.3
Career		187	162	17.3	.555	.333	.565	3.7	.8	.4	.2	8.2	9.5

=== EuroCup ===
Year	Team	GP	GS	MPG	FG%	3P%	FT%	RPG	APG	SPG	BPG	PPG	PIR
2009–10	Benetton Basket	12	7	19.7	**.547**	**.714**	.444	3.3	.6	**1.2**	.1	7.6	8.3
2010–11	Benetton Basket	**16**	**16**	**27.4**	.441	.154	**.620**	**5.6**	**.8**	.9	**.6**	**10.9**	**10.9**
Career		28	23	24.1	.473	.273	.561	4.6	.7	1.0	.4	9.5	9.8

=== Domestic leagues ===
Year	Team	League	GP	MPG	FG%	3P%	FT%	RPG	APG	SPG	BPG	PPG
2008–09	Aisčiai	LKL	20	30.1	.478	.422	.748	7.6	1.4	1.0	.8	21.0
2009–10	Benetton Basket	LBA	31	20.3	.515	.357	.725	4.7	.6	1.2	.2	9.2
2010–11	Benetton Basket	LBA	37	25.6	.525	.429	.715	4.3	.9	1.2	.4	12.8
2011–12	Asseco Prokom	PLK	25	27.0	.468	.286	.667	6.6	1.3	1.2	.9	15.7
2011–12	Asseco Prokom	VTBUL	16	26.7	.477	.326	.655	7.5	.7	.7	.4	13.4
2012–13	R. G. Valley Vipers	D-League	31	34.5	.518	.174	.625	9.7	3.0	.9	.4	20.3
2015–16	R. G. Valley Vipers	D-League	4	25.0	.525	.467	.500	5.7	3.0	1.0	1.0	13.0
2017–18	Shandong Golden Stars	CBA	48	34.2	.576	.352	.571	12.0	2.8	1.5	.6	23.6
2018–19	Shandong Golden Stars	CBA	37	34.2	.551	.323	.528	14.0	4.2	1.8	.8	27.3
2019–20	Shanghai Sharks	CBA	28	36.7	.530	.303	.503	15.1	3.5	1.8	.5	22.8
2020–21	(China) Xinjiang Flying Tigers	CBA	42	34.2	.586	.403	.421	13.7	4.2	2.0	.7	21.6
2021–22	AS Monaco	LNB Élite	36	20.9	.576	.279	.609	4.5	1.2	.7	.2	11.0
2022–23	AS Monaco	LNB Élite	36	17.9	.606	.512	.602	4.6	1.0	.5	.2	10.7
2023–24	AS Monaco	LNB Élite	24	14.3	.530	.344	.605	3.3	1.1	.4	.1	7.5

== State awards ==
- Lithuania: Recipient of the Knight's Cross of the Order for Merits to Lithuania (2013)

== Filmography ==
Year	Title	Role	Notes	Ref
2012	The Other Dream Team	Himself	Documentary about Lithuania men's national team at the 1992 Summer Olympics.	
2012	Mes už... Lietuvą!	Himself	Documentary about Lithuania men's national team at EuroBasket 2011.	
