= List of indoor arenas in China =

The following is a list of indoor arenas in China with a capacity of at least 5,000 spectators. Most of the arenas in this list have multiple uses such as individual sports, team sports as well as cultural events and political events. The largest indoor arena, the 21,000-capacity Nanjing Youth Olympic Sports Park Gymnasium, is the home of basketball club Nanjing Monkey Kings.

== Capacity of at least 10,000 ==
Rank	Location	Arena	Date built	Capacity	Tenants	Image
1	Nanjing	Nanjing Youth Olympic Sports Park Gymnasium		21,000	Nanjing Monkey Kings	
2	Beijing	Beijing National Indoor Stadium	2007	18,000		
3	Beijing	Wukesong Arena	2008	18,000	Beijing Ducks	
4	Chengdu	Chengdu Phoenix Mountain Indoor Stadium	2021	18,000		
5	Dalian	Damai Center	2013	18,000		
6	Guangzhou	Guangzhou International Sports Arena	2010	18,000		
7	Shanghai	Mercedes-Benz Arena		18,000		
8	Shanghai	Shanghai Oriental Sports Center		18,000		
9	Shenzhen	Shenzhen Dayun Arena	2011	18,000	Shenzhen New Century Liebao Club	
10	Beijing	Capital Indoor Stadium	1968	17,345		
11	Dongguan	Bank of Dongguan Basketball Centre	2014	16,133	Guangdong Dongguan Bank	
12	Chengdu	Jinqiang International Event Centre	2023	15,000	Sichuan Blue Whales	
13	Shanghai	Qizhong Forest Sports City Arena		13,779		
14	Nanjing	Nanjing Olympic Sports Center Gymnasium		13,000		
15	Beijing	Workers Indoor Arena	1961	13,000		
16	Wuhan	Wuhan Sports Center Gymnasium		13,000		
17	Shanghai	Shanghai Indoor Stadium		13,000	Shanghai Sharks	
18	Shenzhen	Shenzhen Bay Gymnasium	2011	12,793		
19	Qingdao	Conson Gymnasium	2009	12,500	Qingdao Guoxin Haitian Eagle Club	
20	Jinan	Jinan Olympic Sports Center	2009	12,226		
21	Shenyang	Liaoning Arena		12,000	Liaoning Shenyang Sansheng Flying Leopard Club	
22	Ürümqi	Urumqi Olympic Sports Centre		12,000	Xinjiang Flying Tigers	
23	Harbin	Harbin International Sports Center Gymnasium	2004	10,603		
24	Changchun	Changchun Gymnasium	1984	10,000	Jiutai Rural Commercial Bank	
25	Guangzhou	Guangzhou Gymnasium	2001	10,000		
26	Shenyang	Shenyang Gymnasium	2007	10,000		
27	Tianjin	Tianjin Arena		10,000	Tianjin Ronggang	
28	Nanjing	Wutaishan Gymnasium	1973	10,000	Jiangsu Kentier	

== Capacity below 10,000 ==
Location	Arena	Date built	Capacity	Image
Nanning	Guangxi Gymnasium	2012	9,247	
Guangzhou	Tianhe Gymnasium		9,000	
Jinan	Shandong Arena	1979	8,800	
Foshan	Foshan Lingnan Mingzhu Gymnasium	2006	8,324	
Guangzhou	Nansha Gymnasium		8,080	
Beijing	Beijing Science and Technology University Gymnasium	2007	8,024	
Beijing	Peking University Gymnasium	2008	8,000	
Ningbo	Beilun Gymnasium		8,000	
Beijing	Beijing University of Technology Gymnasium	2007	7,500	
Beijing	Olympic Sports Center Gymnasium		7,000	
Guangzhou	Asian Games Town Gymnasium		6,233	
Changzhou	Xincheng Gymnasium	2008	6,200	
Beijing	China Agricultural University Gymnasium	2007	6,000	
Beijing	Shougang Gymnasium	2002	6,000	
Jinjiang	Zuchang Gymnasium	2002	6,000	
Nanjing	Nangang Gymnasium	1995	6,000	
Qingdao	Qingdao University Gymnasium	2005	6,000	
Yiwu	Yiwu Gymnasium	2005	6,000	
Beijing	Beihang University Gymnasium	2001	5,400	
Taiyuan	Riverside Sports Arena	1998	5,331	
Hangzhou	Hangzhou Gymnasium	1966	5,136	
Beijing	Beijing Institute of Technology Gymnasium	2008	5,000	
Huangpu	Huangpu Sports Centre Gymnasium		5,000	
Harbin	Baqu Arena		5,000	
Ningbo	Youngor Arena	1994	5,000	
Shanghai	Shanghai Yuanshen Sports Centre		5,000	

== Hong Kong ==
Location	Arena	Date built	Capacity	Image
Hong Kong	AsiaWorld–Arena	2005	14,000	
Hong Kong	Hong Kong Coliseum	1983	12,500	

== See also ==
- List of indoor arenas
- List of football stadiums in China
- Lists of stadiums in China
