= 2018 WCBA Playoffs =

The 2018 WCBA Playoffs was the postseason tournament of the 2017–18 season. It began on January 24, 2018.

== Bracket ==
First round 24 January–3 February
1	Beijing Great Wall	3
8	Zhejiang Chouzhou Bank Golden Bulls	1
4	Shanghai Swordfish	3
5	Jiangsu Phoenix	0
2	Xinjiang Magic Deer	1
7	Guangdong Dolphins	3
3	Shanxi Flame	3
6	Heilongjiang Dragons	0

Semifinals
1	Beijing Great Wall	3
4	Shanghai Swordfish	0
7	Guangdong Dolphins	0
3	Shanxi Flame	3

Finals
1	Beijing Great Wall	3
3	Shanxi Flame	0

- Bold Series winner, advanced to the next round
- Italics Team with home-court advantage

The numbers to the left of each team indicate the team's seeding, and the numbers to the right indicate the number of games the team won in that round.

== First round ==
All times are in China standard time (UTC+8)

=== (1) Beijing Great Wall vs. (8) Zhejiang Chouzhou Bank Golden Bulls ===
January 24
19:30

Boxscore

Zhejiang Chouzhou Bank Golden Bulls	88–80	Beijing Great Wall
Scoring by quarter: 19–23, 21–17, 34–18, 14–22
Zhejiang leads series, 1–0

Meihu Arena, Yiwu, Zhejiang
Referees: Wang Zebo, Kang Pengfei, Yuan Jun

January 27
19:30

Boxscore

Beijing Great Wall	96–61	Zhejiang Chouzhou Bank Golden Bulls
Scoring by quarter: 31–13, 23–21, 18–18, 24–9
Series tied, 1–1

Shougang Basketball Center, Beijing
Referees: Shi Jing, Liu Ke, Wang Yang

January 29
19:30

Boxscore

Beijing Great Wall	81–62	Zhejiang Chouzhou Bank Golden Bulls
Scoring by quarter: 26–18, 17–17, 21–12, 17–15
Beijing leads series, 2–1

Shougang Basketball Center, Beijing
Referees: Yang Xiaoguang, Wang Haiying, Hu Jing

February 3
19:30

Boxscore

Zhejiang Chouzhou Bank Golden Bulls	59–81	Beijing Great Wall
Scoring by quarter: 19–23, 14–22, 20–19, 6–17
Beijing wins series, 3–1

Meihu Arena, Yiwu, Zhejiang
Referees: Zuo Kun, Yu Yijing, Geng Zijian

=== (2) Xinjiang Magic Deer vs. (7) Guangdong Dolphins ===
January 24
19:30

Boxscore

Guangdong Dolphins	86–91	Xinjiang Magic Deer
Scoring by quarter: 18–24, 19–23, 20–21, 29–23
Xinjiang leads series, 1–0

Dalang Arena, Dongguan, Guangdong
Referees: Peng Ling, Wang Xiang, Ge Qian

January 27
20:00

Boxscore

Xinjiang Magic Deer	74–81	Guangdong Dolphins
Scoring by quarter: 17–22, 15–21, 19–19, 23–19
Series tied, 1–1

Xinjiang Sports Centre Gymnasium, Ürümqi, Xinjiang
Referees: Song Zhanjun, Zhang Dongmei, Li Pengbo

January 29
20:00

Boxscore

Xinjiang Magic Deer	73–83	Guangdong Dolphins
Scoring by quarter: 14–20, 13–25, 26–17, 20–21
Guangdong leads series, 2–1

Xinjiang Sports Centre Gymnasium, Ürümqi, Xinjiang
Referees: Shi Jing, Li Zhihui, Liu Qi

February 3
19:30

Boxscore

Guangdong Dolphins	89–78	Xinjiang Magic Deer
Scoring by quarter: 16–24, 29–19, 19–18, 25–17
Guangdong wins series, 3–1

Dalang Arena, Dongguan, Guangdong
Referees: Qiao Longsheng, Fang Wenxuan, Liu Ke

=== (3) Shanxi Flame vs. (6) Heilongjiang Dragons ===
January 24
16:00

Boxscore

Heilongjiang Dragons	81–92	Shanxi Flame
Scoring by quarter: 19–19, 24–22, 24–28, 14–23
Shanxi leads series, 1–0

Daqing Gymnasium, Daqing, Heilongjiang
Referees: Zheng Lei, Wang Qiulin, Pan Dazhi

January 27
19:30

Boxscore

Shanxi Flame	74–65	Heilongjiang Dragons
Scoring by quarter: 21–14, 12–17, 25–14, 16–20
Shanxi leads series, 2–0

Shanxi Sports Centre Gymnasium, Taiyuan, Shanxi
Referees: Zuo Kun, Shi Qirong, Liu Sen

January 29
19:30

Boxscore

Shanxi Flame	91–66	Heilongjiang Dragons
Scoring by quarter: 21–17, 25–12, 26–17, 19–20
Shanxi wins series, 3–0

Shanxi Sports Centre Gymnasium, Taiyuan, Shanxi
Referees: Zhang Wei, Liu Huabo, Duan Xiaopeng

=== (4) Shanghai Swordfish vs. (5) Jiangsu Phoenix ===
January 24
19:30

Boxscore

Jiangsu Phoenix	71–98	Shanghai Swordfish
Scoring by quarter: 20–33, 21–18, 18–26, 12–21
Shanghai leads series, 1–0

Jiangning Sports Center Gymnasium, Nanjing, Jiangsu
Referees: Zhang Wei, Xu Jian, Yu Yijing

January 27
19:30

Boxscore

Shanghai Swordfish	96–84	Jiangsu Phoenix
Scoring by quarter: 18–23, 28–15, 23–18, 27–28
Shanghai leads series, 2–0

Baoshan Sports Center Gymnasium, Shanghai
Referees: Yang Xiaoguang, Xue Kui, Liu Shuo

January 29
16:00

Boxscore

Shanghai Swordfish	86–76	Jiangsu Phoenix
Scoring by quarter: 18–19, 25–17, 23–16, 20–24
Shanghai wins series, 3–0

Baoshan Sports Center Gymnasium, Shanghai
Referees: Xue Kui, Chen Yingbai, Wen Zhilin

== Semifinals ==
=== (1) Beijing Great Wall vs. (4) Shanghai Swordfish ===
February 10
19:30

Boxscore

Shanghai Swordfish	65–81	Beijing Great Wall
Scoring by quarter: 20–15, 14–23, 13–24, 18–19
Beijing leads series, 1–0

Baoshan Sports Center Gymnasium, Shanghai
Referees: Shi Jing, Zhang Wei, Wang Qiulin

February 24
19:30

Boxscore

Beijing Great Wall	85–62	Shanghai Swordfish
Scoring by quarter: 21–14, 22–16, 24–17, 18–15
Beijing leads series, 2–0

Shougang Basketball Center, Beijing
Referees: Jiang Zhiyuan, Shi Qirong, Feng Lei

February 26
16:00

Boxscore

Beijing Great Wall	76–72	Shanghai Swordfish
Scoring by quarter: 22–25, 13–20, 24–14, 17–13
Beijing wins series, 3–0

Shougang Basketball Center, Beijing
Referees: Wang Mei, Fang Wenxuan, Liu Shuo

=== (3) Shanxi Flame vs. (7) Guangdong Dolphins ===
February 10
19:30

Boxscore

Guangdong Dolphins	62–73	Shanxi Flame
Scoring by quarter: 16–19, 16–19, 18–22, 12–13
Shanxi leads series, 1–0

Dalang Arena, Dongguan, Guangdong
Referees: Xin Genwei, Xue Kui, Zhang Dongmei

February 24
19:30

Boxscore

Shanxi Flame	88–84 (OT)	Guangdong Dolphins
Scoring by quarter: 16–21, 24–16, 18–19, 21–23, Overtime: 9–5
Shanxi leads series, 2–0

Shanxi Sports Centre Gymnasium, Taiyuan, Shanxi
Referees: Song Zhanjun, Zuo Kun, Liu Sen

February 26
19:30

Boxscore

Shanxi Flame	78–69	Guangdong Dolphins
Scoring by quarter: –, –, –, –
Shanxi wins series, 3–0

Shanxi Sports Centre Gymnasium, Taiyuan, Shanxi
Referees: Yan Jun, Li Kai, Wang Zebo

== Final ==
=== (1) Beijing Great Wall vs. (3) Shanxi Flame ===
March 10
16:00

Boxscore

Shanxi Flame	81–84	Beijing Great Wall
Scoring by quarter: 21–19, 17–18, 22–23, 21–24
Beijing leads series, 1–0

Shanxi Sports Centre Gymnasium, Taiyuan, Shanxi
Referees: Yan Jun, Shi Jing, Fang Wenxuan

March 12
16:00

Boxscore

Beijing Great Wall	82–55	Shanxi Flame
Scoring by quarter: 19–11, 18–10, 19–17, 26–17
Beijing leads series, 2–0

Shougang Basketball Center, Beijing
Referees: Qiao Longsheng, Zhang Wei, Shi Qirong

March 14
20:00

Boxscore

Beijing Great Wall	85–63	Shanxi Flame
Scoring by quarter: 24–16, 23–13, 20–16, 18–18
Beijing wins series, 3–0

Shougang Basketball Center, Beijing
Referees: Jiang Zhiyuan, Zuo Kun, Xue Kui
