= Wang Zhelin =

Chinese basketball player (born 1994)

Wang Zhelin 王哲林
No. 94 – Shanghai Sharks
- Position: Center
- League: CBA

Personal information
- Born: January 20, 1994 (age 32) Fuzhou, Fujian, China
- Listed height: 2.14 m (7 ft 0 in)
- Listed weight: 120 kg (265 lb)

Career information
- NBA draft: 2016: 2nd round, 57th overall pick
- Drafted by: Memphis Grizzlies
- Playing career: 2012–present

Career history
- 2012–2021: Fujian Sturgeons
- 2021–present: Shanghai Sharks

Career highlights
- 2× CBA Club Cup champion (2025, 2026); All-CBA Domestic First Team (2023); 2x CBA Domestic MVP (2019, 2023); 11× CBA All-Star (2013–2015, 2017, 2019–2024, 2026); CBA Rookie of the Year (2013)
- Stats at Basketball Reference
Medals
Men's basketball
Representing China
FIBA Asia Championship
Gold medal – first place	2015 Changsha
Asian Games
Gold medal – first place	2018 Jakarta-Palembang
Bronze medal – third place	2022 Hangzhou
East Asian Games
Silver medal – second place	2013 Tianjin
FIBA Asia Under-18 Championship
Gold medal – first place	2010 Yemen
Gold medal – first place	2012 Ulan Bator

Wang Zhelin
- Chinese: 王哲林
Transcriptions
Standard Mandarin
- Hanyu Pinyin: Wáng Zhélín
- IPA: [wǎŋ ʈʂɤ̌lǐn]

Wang Zhelin (Chinese: 王哲林, pronounced [wǎŋ ʈʂɤ̌lǐn]; born January 20, 1994) is a Chinese professional basketball player for the Shanghai Sharks in the Chinese Basketball Association. He was drafted in the second round (57th overall) in the 2016 NBA draft by the Memphis Grizzlies.

== Professional career ==
Wang Zhelin first gained recognition in March 2012 when he was selected to the Chinese national team's preliminary squad for the 2012 Summer Olympics though he did not make the final squad. In April 2012, Wang was chosen to play at the Nike Hoop Summit and he impressed many by scoring 19 points, 8 rebounds, and blocking 2 shots in an 84–75 victory against the U.S. men's junior select team. This was the best all-time performance by any Chinese player in the Nike Hoop Summit.

=== Fujian Sturgeons (2012–2021) ===
Wang then signed his first professional contract with the Fujian Sturgeons of the Chinese Basketball Association in June 2012, prior to the 2012–13 season. In his first professional season, Wang averaged 20.3 points and 12.9 rebounds per game for Fujian. His second season with Fujian saw him put up a career-high 22.8 points per game. His injury-derailed fourth season saw him produce career-low averages of 10 points, 6 rebounds and 0.4 blocks in 21.3 minutes of average action.

In 2018, he played in the 2018 NBA Summer League as a member of the China men's national basketball team. In the first game, the Chinese team lost to the Indiana Pacers by a score of 56–36. In the second game, Wang faced off against fellow Chinese player Zhou Qi and the Houston Rockets, losing 78–66.

In the third game, Wang scored six points in the Chinese team's 73–72 loss to the Sacramento Kings. In the fourth game, the China men's national basketball team won its first game, 68–42, against the Washington Wizards. Wang did not play in this game due to illness. In the last game, the China team beat the Detroit Pistons by a score of 66–62. In this series, China won two games and lost three games, but Wang did not play all of these games due to illness.

In 2018-2019 CBA regular season, Wang reached career high of 25.7 PPG and 13.9 RPG on 54% shooting and led his team to the 2nd round of the CBA playoffs. Wang also received the 2018-2019 CBA Regular season MVP for this first time.

=== NBA draft rights ===
Wang was selected late in the second round of the 2016 NBA draft by the Memphis Grizzlies as the 57th pick. Fellow countryman Zhou Qi was selected with the 43rd pick by the Houston Rockets, the second time two Chinese prospects were selected in an NBA draft (the first time being in 2007 with Yi Jianlian and Sun Yue). However, Wang would not immediately join the Grizzlies, instead returning with Fujian for the following season to develop.

On September 10, 2021, Wang's NBA draft rights were traded to the Los Angeles Lakers for Marc Gasol, a 2024 second–round pick, and cash.

On January 3, 2022, his draft rights were moved again, this time to the New York Knicks, as part of a three-team deal with the Lakers and the Cleveland Cavaliers.

== National team career ==
Wang played for the Chinese national team at the 2015 FIBA Asia Championship played in China. Coming off the bench, he participated in China's romp to the title and qualification for the 2016 Olympics.

In 2018, Wang played unofficial practice games with 2018 NBA Summer League teams as a member of the China men's national basketball team. In the first game, the China men's national basketball team lost 36–56 against the Indiana Pacers.

In the second game, Wang played against fellow Chinese national team member Houston Rockets named Zhou Qi, and the China men's national basketball team lost 66–78 against the Houston Rockets.

In the third game, Wang scored three points and the China men's national basketball team lost 72–73 against the Sacramento Kings.

In the fourth game, the China men's national basketball team earned their first win of the summer, a 68–42 triumph over the Washington Wizards. Wang did not play in this game due to illness.

In the last game of the series, China won 66–62 against the Detroit Pistons.

In August 2018, he played for China at the Asian Games. In the first game, China won 82–80, and Wang scored 13 points. In the end, he helped China win the 2018 Asian Games.

Wang was included in China's squad for the 2023 FIBA Basketball World Cup qualification.

== Career statistics ==
=== CBA ===
Year	Team	GP	RPG	APG	FG%	FT%	PPG
2012–13	Fujian	32	12.9	1.3	.531	.627	20.3
2013–14	Fujian	34	11.4	1.1	.586	.732	22.8
2014–15	Fujian	37	11.5	1.7	.607	.668	21.6
2015–16	Fujian	9	6.0	1.1	.522	.667	11.3
2016–17	Fujian	32	11.1	2.2	.578	.639	21.8
2017–18	Fujian	27	11.0	1.9	.603	.643	20.7
2018–19	Fujian	46	13.9	2.3	.547	.651	25.7
