= 2017 CBA Playoffs =

The 2017 CBA Playoffs is the postseason tournament of the Chinese Basketball Association's 2016–17 season.

== Bracket ==
Teams in bold advanced to the next round. The numbers to the left of each team indicate the team's seeding, and the numbers to the right indicate the number of games the team won in that round. Teams with home court advantage are shown in italics.

First Round; 24 February–3 March
1	**Xinjiang Flying Tigers**	**3**
8	Shandong Golden Stars	1
4	Zhejiang Lions	1
5	**Liaoning Flying Leopards**	**3**
2	**Guangdong Southern Tigers**	**3**
7	Sichuan Blue Whales	0
3	Shanghai Sharks	2
6	**Shenzhen Leopards**	**3**

Semifinals; 10–19 March
1	**Xinjiang Flying Tigers**	**4**
5	Liaoning Flying Leopards	1
2	**Guangdong Southern Tigers**	**4**
6	Shenzhen Leopards	1

Finals; 31 March–7 April
1	**Xinjiang Flying Tigers**	**4**
2	Guangdong Southern Tigers	0

- **Bold** Series winner
- Italics Team with home-court advantage

== First round ==
All times are in China standard time (UTC+8)

=== (1) Xinjiang Flying Tigers vs. (8) Shandong Golden Stars ===
February 24
19:35

Xinjiang Flying Tigers 78, **Shandong Golden Stars** **95**
Scoring by quarter: 16–**17**, 22–**32**, 16–**24**, **24**–22
**Shandong leads series, 1–0**

Shandong Arena, Jinan, Shandong
Referees: Xia Chun, He Jingzhou, Yang Xiaoguang

February 26
20:00

Shandong Golden Stars 104, **Xinjiang Flying Tigers** **119**
Scoring by quarter: 14–**33**, **34**–29, 22–**42**, **34**–15
**Series tied, 1–1**

Hongshan Arena, Ürümqi, Xinjiang
Referees: Wang Junzhi, Sun Weibing, Wei Guoliang

March 1
20:00

Shandong Golden Stars 93, **Xinjiang Flying Tigers** **102**
Scoring by quarter: 21–**24**, **30**–28, 14–**24**, **28**–26
**Xinjiang leads series, 2–1**

Hongshan Arena, Ürümqi, Xinjiang
Referees: Yang Maogong, Song Xiaojing, Jiang Zhiyuan

March 3
19:35

**Xinjiang Flying Tigers** **108**, Shandong Golden Stars 102
Scoring by quarter: 20–**27**, 25–**33**, **33**–17, **30**–25
**Xinjiang wins series, 3–1**

Shandong Arena, Jinan, Shandong
Referees: Wen Keming, Wang Mei, Duan Zhu

=== (2) Guangdong Southern Tigers vs. (7) Sichuan Blue Whales ===
February 24
19:35

**Guangdong Southern Tigers** **111**, Sichuan Blue Whales 91
Scoring by quarter: **27**–22, **31**–30, **25**–23, **28**–16
**Guangdong leads series, 1–0**

Sichuan Provincial Stadium, Chengdu, Sichuan
Referees: Song Yanping, Song Xiaojing, Wang Honghua

February 26
19:35

Sichuan Blue Whales 99, **Guangdong Southern Tigers** **123**
Scoring by quarter: 27–**33**, 21–**27**, 21–**31**, 30–**32**
**Guangdong leads series, 2–0**

Dongguan Basketball Center, Dongguan, Guangdong
Referees: Yang Maogong, Liang Bin, Lin Wenwu

March 1
19:35

Sichuan Blue Whales 97, **Guangdong Southern Tigers** **119**
Scoring by quarter: 27–**29**, 19–**25**, 23–**33**, 28–**32**
**Guangdong wins series, 3–0**

Dongguan Basketball Center, Dongguan, Guangdong
Referees: Wang Junzhi, Yang Hongfeng, Ye Nan

=== (3) Shanghai Sharks vs. (6) Shenzhen Leopards ===
February 24
19:35

Shanghai Sharks 75, **Shenzhen Leopards** **115**
Scoring by quarter: 23–**30**, 15–**30**, 8–**31**, **29**–24
**Shenzhen leads series, 1–0**

Shenzhen Dayun Arena, Shenzhen, Guangdong
Referees: Wang Mei, Yang Hongfeng, Ye Nan

February 26
19:35

Shenzhen Leopards 99, **Shanghai Sharks** **107** (OT)
Scoring by quarter: 21–**22**, **31**–26, 24–**26**, 16–**18**, Overtime: 7–**15**
**Series tied, 1–1**

Yuanshen Gymnasium, Shanghai
Referees: Qiao Longsheng, Zhang Peng, Han Xu

March 1
19:35

Shenzhen Leopards 92, **Shanghai Sharks** **95**
Scoring by quarter: 23–**25**, 25–**27**, **25**–17, 19–**26**
**Shanghai leads series, 2–1**

Yuanshen Gymnasium, Shanghai
Referees: Wen Keming, Liang Bin, Duan Zhu

March 3
19:35

Shanghai Sharks 93, **Shenzhen Leopards** **100**
Scoring by quarter: 17–**28**, **30**–24, 22–**29**, **24**–19
**Series tied, 2–2**

Shenzhen Dayun Arena, Shenzhen, Guangdong
Referees: Song Yanping, Song Xiaojing, Ye Nan

March 5
19:35

**Shenzhen Leopards** **102**, Shanghai Sharks 95 (OT)
Scoring by quarter: 24–24, **29**–21, 18–**19**, 18–**25**, Overtime: **13**–6
**Shenzhen wins series, 3–2**

Yuanshen Gymnasium, Shanghai
Referees: Yang Maogong, Wen Keming, Jiang Zhiyuan

=== (4) Zhejiang Lions vs. (5) Liaoning Flying Leopards ===
February 24
19:35

Zhejiang Lions 114, **Liaoning Flying Leopards** **124**
Scoring by quarter: 21–**33**, 25–**29**, **28**–26, **40**–36
**Liaoning leads series 1–0**

Benxi Gymnasium, Benxi, Liaoning
Referees: Qiao Longsheng, Duan Zhu, Guo Nan

February 26
19:35

Liaoning Flying Leopards 110, **Zhejiang Lions** **118**
Scoring by quarter: 22–22, **31**–26, 16–**37**, **41**–33
**Series tied, 1–1**

Hangzhou Gymnasium, Hangzhou, Zhejiang
Referees: Wen Keming, Yan Jun, Cui Zhexiong

March 1
19:35

**Liaoning Flying Leopards** **117**, Zhejiang Lions 100
Scoring by quarter: **21**–19, **35**–22, 28–**31**, **33**–28
**Liaoning leads series 2–1**

Hangzhou Gymnasium, Hangzhou, Zhejiang
Referees: Song Yanping, Wang Mei, He Jingzhou

March 3
19:35

Zhejiang Lions 106, **Liaoning Flying Leopards** **112**
Scoring by quarter: 27–27, 22–**23**, **32**–30, 25–**32**
**Liaoning wins series, 3–1**

Benxi Gymnasium, Benxi, Liaoning
Referees: Qiao Longsheng, Liang Bin, Yang Hongfeng

== Semifinals ==
All times are in China standard time (UTC+8)

=== (1) Xinjiang Flying Tigers vs. (5) Liaoning Flying Leopards ===
March 10
19:35

Liaoning Flying Leopards 93, **Xinjiang Flying Tigers** **118**
Scoring by quarter: 21–**25**, 25–**33**, 26–**37**, 21–**23**
**Xinjiang leads series, 1–0**

Hongshan Arena, Ürümqi, Xinjiang
Referees: Wen Keming, He Jingzhou, Duan Zhu

March 12
19:35

Liaoning Flying Leopards 90, **Xinjiang Flying Tigers** **102**
Scoring by quarter: **23**–18, 22–22, 15–**32**, 30–30
**Xinjiang leads series, 2–0**

Hongshan Arena, Ürümqi, Xinjiang
Referees: Qiao Longsheng, Du Xiyuan, Song Xiaojing

March 15
19:35

**Xinjiang Flying Tigers** **116**, Liaoning Flying Leopards 108
Scoring by quarter: **31**–22, **29**–22, **37**–24, 19–**40**
**Xinjiang leads series, 3–0**

Benxi Gymnasium, Benxi, Liaoning
Referees: Wen Keming, Wang Xiaochun, Duan Zhu

March 17
19:35

Xinjiang Flying Tigers 107, **Liaoning Flying Leopards** **109**
Scoring by quarter: 25–**33**, **32**–29, **24**–22, **26**–25
**Xinjiang leads series, 3–1**

Benxi Gymnasium, Benxi, Liaoning
Referees: Song Yanping, Wang Mei, Ye Nan

March 19
19:35

**Xinjiang Flying Tigers** **111**, Liaoning Flying Leopards 103
Scoring by quarter: **31**–26, **27**–23, 26–**35**, **27**–19
**Xinjiang wins series, 4–1**

Benxi Gymnasium, Benxi, Liaoning
Referees: Qiao Longsheng, Liang Bin, Yang Hongfeng

=== (2) Guangdong Southern Tigers vs. (6) Shenzhen Leopards ===
March 10
19:35

Shenzhen Leopards 113, **Guangdong Southern Tigers** **130**
Scoring by quarter: 18–**38**, **33**–28, 28–**36**, **34**–28
**Guangdong leads series, 1–0**

Dongguan Basketball Center, Dongguan, Guangdong
Referees: Wang Junzhi, Liang Bin, Ye Nan

March 12
19:35

Shenzhen Leopards 88, **Guangdong Southern Tigers** **98**
Scoring by quarter: 18–**26**, **26**–22, 23–**25**, 21–**25**
**Guangdong leads series, 2–0**

Dongguan Basketball Center, Dongguan, Guangdong
Referees: Song Yanping, Wang Mei, Yang Hongfeng

March 15
20:00

Guangdong Southern Tigers 90, **Shenzhen Leopards** **109**
Scoring by quarter: 28–28, 23–**25**, 23–**32**, 16–**24**
**Guangdong leads series, 2–1**

Shenzhen Dayun Arena, Shenzhen, Guangdong
Referees: Yang Maogong, Jiang Zhiyuan, Yan Jun

March 17
19:35

**Guangdong Southern Tigers** **90**, Shenzhen Leopards 81
Scoring by quarter: **24**–18, 25–25, 17–**23**, **24**–15
**Guangdong leads series, 3–1**

Shenzhen Dayun Arena, Shenzhen, Guangdong
Referees: Xia Chun, Song Xiaojing, Du Xiyuan

March 19
19:35

**Guangdong Southern Tigers** **103**, Shenzhen Leopards 90
Scoring by quarter: **31**–16, **31**–24, 28–**32**, 13–**18**
**Guangdong wins series, 4–1**

Shenzhen Dayun Arena, Shenzhen, Guangdong
Referees: Yang Maogong, Wang Mei, Duan Zhu

== Finals ==
All times are in China standard time (UTC+8)

=== (1) Xinjiang Flying Tigers vs. (2) Guangdong Southern Tigers ===
March 31
20:00

Guangdong Southern Tigers 105, **Xinjiang Flying Tigers** **122**
Scoring by quarter: 27–**29**, 23–**31**, 29–**37**, **26**–25
**Xinjiang leads series, 1–0**

Hongshan Arena, Ürümqi, Xinjiang
Referees: Wang Junzhi, Xia Chun, He Jingzhou

April 2
20:00

Guangdong Southern Tigers 97, **Xinjiang Flying Tigers** **103**
Scoring by quarter: **30**–16, 18–**34**, **32**–31, 17–**22**
**Xinjiang leads series, 2–0**

Hongshan Arena, Ürümqi, Xinjiang
Referees: Yang Maogong, Wen Keming, Yang Hongfeng

April 5
19:30

**Xinjiang Flying Tigers** **104**, Guangdong Southern Tigers 91
Scoring by quarter: **32**–15, **30**–29, **23**–21, 19–**26**
**Xinjiang leads series, 3–0**

Dongguan Basketball Center, Dongguan, Guangdong
Referees: Qiao Longsheng, Liang Bin, Song Xiaojing

April 7
19:30

**Xinjiang Flying Tigers** **117**, Guangdong Southern Tigers 109
Scoring by quarter: 17–**27**, **36**–22, **34**–26, 30–**34**
**Xinjiang wins series, 4–0**

Dongguan Basketball Center, Dongguan, Guangdong
Referees: Yang Maogong, Qiao Longsheng, Wen Keming
