= Wutaishan Gymnasium =

Indoor arena in Nanjing, China

Coordinates: 32°3′4″N 118°46′1″E

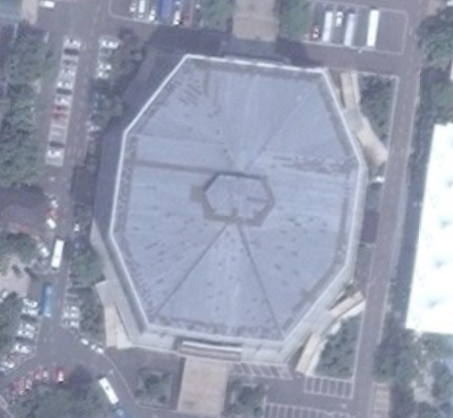
- Interactive map of Wutaishan Gymnasium
- Location: Nanjing, China
- Capacity: 10,000

Construction
- Built: 1973
- Opened: 10 June 1975
- Renovated: 2002

The Wutaishan Gymnasium is an indoor arena in Nanjing, China. The arena is used mainly for indoor sports such as basketball, and it hosted the final round of the 2002 FIBA World Championship for Women. The facility has a capacity of 10,000 people.

== See also ==
- List of indoor arenas in China
