= Changchun Gymnasium =

Sports venue in Changchun, China

Coordinates: 43°52′56.5″N 125°19′25.6″E

- Interactive map of Changchun Gymnasium
- Full name: Changchun Gymnasium
- Location: Changchun, China
- Capacity: 10,000

Construction
- Opened: 1957 (renovated 2023)

Tenant
- Jilin Northeast Tigers (CBA)

Changchun Gymnasium is an indoor sporting arena located in Changchun, China. The capacity of the arena is 4,299 spectators and opened in 1957. It hosts indoor sporting events such as basketball and volleyball. Prior to 2012 it hosted the Jilin Northeast Tigers of the Chinese Basketball Association. The new arena is located on the campus of Northeast Normal University (Dongbei Shida 东北师大)

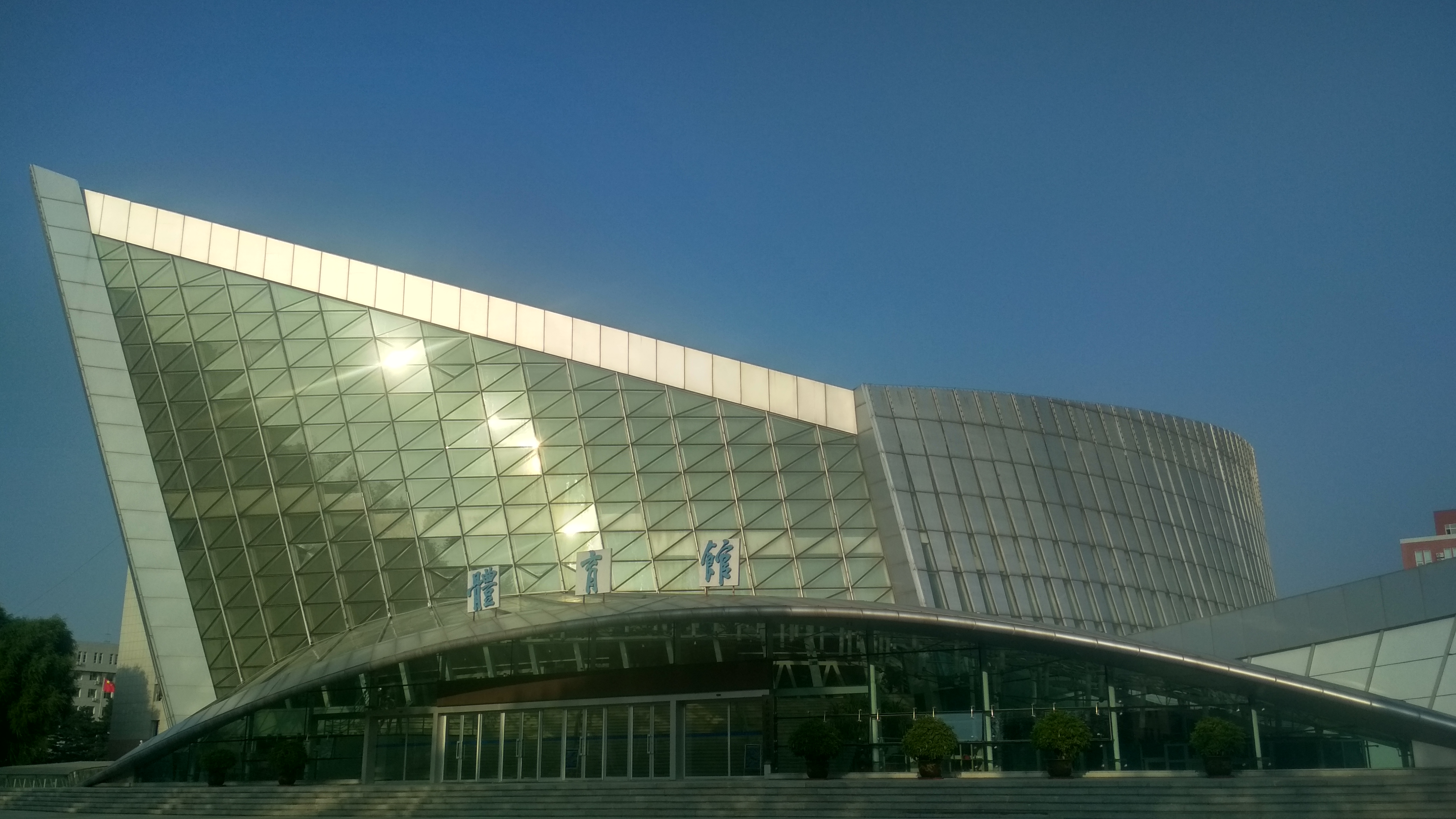
Northeast Normal University Gymnasium

== See also ==
- Sports in China
- List of indoor arenas in China
