= Shandong Arena =

Sports venue in Jinan, China

Coordinates: 36°38′47″N 117°00′05″E

Shandong Arena 山东体育馆
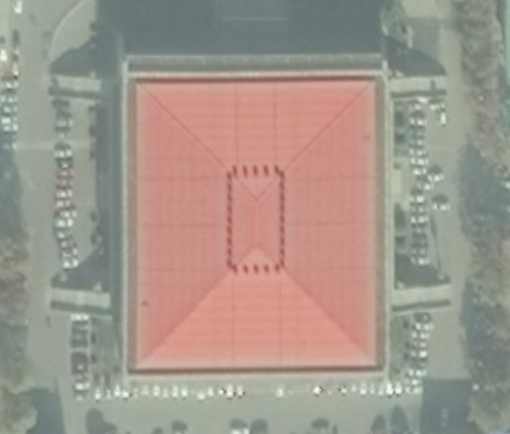
- Interactive map of Shandong Arena 山东体育馆
- Full name: Shandong Arena
- Location: Jinan, Shandong, China
- Capacity: 8,800

Construction
- Opened: 1979

Tenant
- Shandong Heroes (CBA)

Shandong Arena (simplified Chinese: 山东体育馆; traditional Chinese: 山東體育館; pinyin: Shāndōng Tǐyùguǎn) is an indoor sporting arena located in Jinan, Shandong, China. The capacity of the arena is 8,800 spectators and opened in 1979. It hosts indoor sporting events such as basketball and volleyball. It hosts the Shandong Heroes of the Chinese Basketball Association (CBA).

== See also ==
- List of indoor arenas in China
