= Zuchang Gymnasium =

Sports venue in Jinjiang, Fujian, China

Coordinates: 24°48′25″N 118°34′05″E

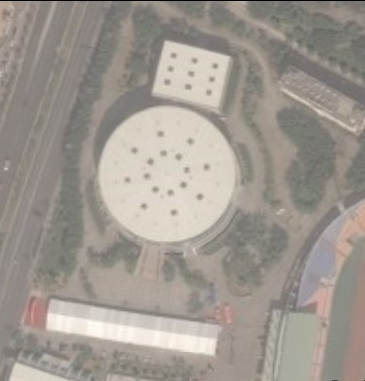
- Interactive map of Zuchang Gymnasium
- Full name: Zuchang Gymnasium
- Location: Jinjiang, China
- Capacity: 6,000

Construction
- Opened: 2002

Tenant
- Fujian Xunxing (CBA)

Zuchang Gymnasium is an indoor sporting arena located in Jinjiang, Fujian, China. The capacity of the arena is 6,000 spectators and opened in 2002. It hosts indoor sporting events such as basketball and volleyball. It hosts the Fujian Xunxing of the Chinese Basketball Association.
