= Fujian Sturgeons =

- League: CBA
- Founded: 1999; 27 years ago
- History: Fujian Sturgeons (2004–present)
- Arena: Zuchang Gymnasium
- Capacity: 6,000
- Location: Jinjiang, Quanzhou, Fujian, China
- Team colors: Sky blue, White, Coral orange
- Head coach: Aleksandar Kesar
- Championships: None
| Home | Away | Third |

Fujian SBS Xunxing Sturgeons (Simplified Chinese: 福建SBS浔兴鲟) or Fujian Xunxing or Fujian SBS are a Chinese professional men's basketball team in the Chinese Basketball Association, based in Jinjiang, Quanzhou, Fujian. The "SBS" reflects corporate sponsorship from the Jinjiang-based Fujian SBS Zipper Science and Technology Corporation. Unlike all the other teams in the CBA, the team originally had no English–friendly animal–type nickname.

The Fujian Sturgeons made their debut in the 2004–2005 season, and finished in seventh and last place in the South Division, out of the playoffs. In 2005–2006, they tied for fifth, just one win away from making the playoffs.

== Current roster ==
Note: Flags indicate national team eligibility at FIBA-sanctioned events. Players may hold other non-FIBA nationalities not displayed.

Fujian Sturgeons roster
Players
Coaches

| Pos. | No. | Nat. | Name | Ht. | Wt. |
|---|---|---|---|---|---|
| G | 0 | (China) | Liu Jinyu | 1.97 m (6 ft 6 in) | 91 kg (201 lb) |
| G | 3 | (United States) | Javion Hamlet | 1.93 m (6 ft 4 in) | 88 kg (194 lb) |
| G | 4 | (United States) | Daryl Macon | 1.88 m (6 ft 2 in) | 84 kg (185 lb) |
| G | 5 | (China) | Li Jianghuai | 1.90 m (6 ft 3 in) | 80 kg (176 lb) |
| SF | 6 | (China) | Zou Yang | 1.99 m (6 ft 6 in) | 92 kg (203 lb) |
| G | 7 | (China) | Yang Ali | 1.84 m (6 ft 0 in) | 76 kg (168 lb) |
| PG | 10 | (China) | Li Yiyang | 1.83 m (6 ft 0 in) | 80 kg (176 lb) |
| PG | 12 | (China) | Zeng Lingxuan | 1.91 m (6 ft 3 in) | 85 kg (187 lb) |
| PG | 13 | (China) | Wang Haidong | 1.82 m (6 ft 0 in) | 80 kg (176 lb) |
| G/F | 14 | (China) | Huang Yichao | 1.98 m (6 ft 6 in) | 100 kg (220 lb) |
| PF | 16 | (China) | Yang Xihao | 2.05 m (6 ft 9 in) | 100 kg (220 lb) |
| SF | 19 | (China) | Shi Jiajun | 2.02 m (6 ft 8 in) | 85 kg (187 lb) |
| G/F | 22 | (China) | Zheng Xiaogang | 1.94 m (6 ft 4 in) | 90 kg (198 lb) |
| C | 24 | (China) | Liu Li | 2.10 m (6 ft 11 in) | 120 kg (265 lb) |
| PF | 25 | (United States) (Philippines) | Bennie Boatwright | 2.08 m (6 ft 10 in) | 107 kg (236 lb) |
| F/C | 27 | (China) | Zhang Qingrui | 2.06 m (6 ft 9 in) | 100 kg (220 lb) |
| F/C | 36 | (China) | Feng Xuzhen | 2.09 m (6 ft 10 in) | 115 kg (254 lb) |
| F/C | 55 | (China) | Su Ruoyo | 2.07 m (6 ft 9 in) | 117 kg (258 lb) |
| G | 77 | (China) | Liu Jinyu | 1.97 m (6 ft 6 in) | 91 kg (201 lb) |

Head coach

- (Serbia) Aleksandar Kesar

Assistant coach(es)

- (Montenegro) Luka Sjekloća

Legend

- (C) Team captain
- Injured

- Roster
Updated: 30 September 2026

== Seasons ==
| Seasons | Wins | Loses | Division Standing | League Standing |
|---|---|---|---|---|
| 2004–2005 | 8 | 30 | 7 | 14 |
| 2005–2006 | 20 | 22 | 6 | 7 |
| 2006–2007 | 19 | 11 | 3 | 5 |
| 2007–2008 | 17 | 13 | 4 | 7 |
| 2008–2009 | 29 | 21 | 4 | 6 |
| 2009–2010 | 17 | 15 | 4 | 7 |
| 2010–2011 | 8 | 24 | 8 (Last) | 16 |
| 2011–2012 | 17 | 15 | 4 | 8 |

== Notable players ==
Note: Flags indicate national team eligibility at FIBA-sanctioned events. Players may hold other non-FIBA nationalities not displayed.

Criteria

To appear in this section a player must have either:

- Set a club record or won an individual award while at the club
- Played at least one official international match for their national team at any time
- Played at least one official NBA match at any time.

- (United States) Chris Porter (2005, 2006–2010)
- (China) Liu Yudong (2007–2010)
- (China) Zhao Tailong (2007–2010)
- (Lebanon) (United States) Matt Freije (2008–2009)
- (United States) Jelani McCoy (2009–2010)
- (United States) Dwayne Jones (2010–2011)
- (United States) Andre Emmett (2010–2011)
- (United States) Sundiata Gaines (2012–2013)
- (United States) Will McDonald (2012–2014)
- (China) Wang Zhelin (2012–) (Was drafted by the Memphis Grizzlies in 2016)
- (United States) Delonte West (2013–2014)
- (Iran) Samad Nikkhah Bahrami (2013–2014)
- (United States) Al Harrington (2014)
- (United States) John Lucas III (2014–2015)
- (United States) D. J. White (2014–2015)
- (Lebanon) Fadi El Khatib (2015–2016)
- (United States) Dwight Buycks (2015–2017)
- (United States) Jeremy Tyler (2015–2016)
- (United States) J.J. Hickson (2016–2017)
- (United States) Sebastian Telfair (2016–2017)
- (United States) Russ Smith (2017–2018)
- (United States) Mike Harris (2017–2018)
- (United States) Xavier Munford (2018)
- (United States) (Israel) Amar'e Stoudemire (2019)
- (United States) Erick Green (2019-20)
- (United States) Ty Lawson (2020)

== Head coaches ==
- Aaron McCarthy (2004–2010)
- Zhang Degui (2010)
- J. C. Owens (2010–2011)
- Ma Lianbao (2011)
- Casey Owens (2011–2012)
- Tab Baldwin & Nenad Vučinić (as a technical consultant) (2012–2013)
- Zhu Shilong (2013)
- Zhang Degui (2013–2014)
- Judas Prada (2014)
- Zhu Shilong (2014)
- Aleksandar Kesar (2014–2015)
- Cui Wangjun (2015–2016)
- Xu Guijun (2016–2017)
- Fan Bin (2017–2018)
- Zhu Shilong (2018–)
