= Liaoning Gymnasium =

Sports venue in Shenyang, China

- 辽宁体育馆
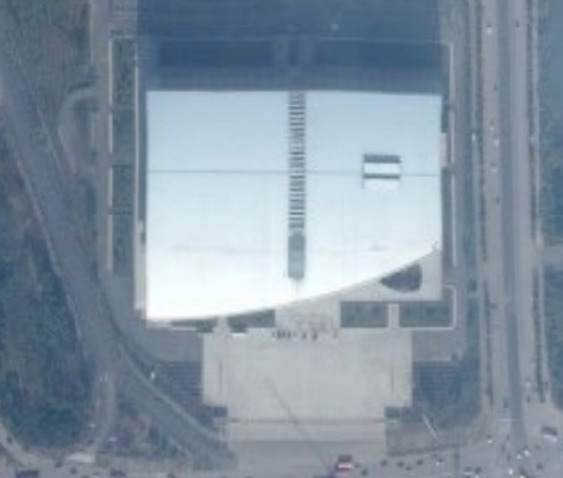
- Aerial view of Liaoning Gymnasium

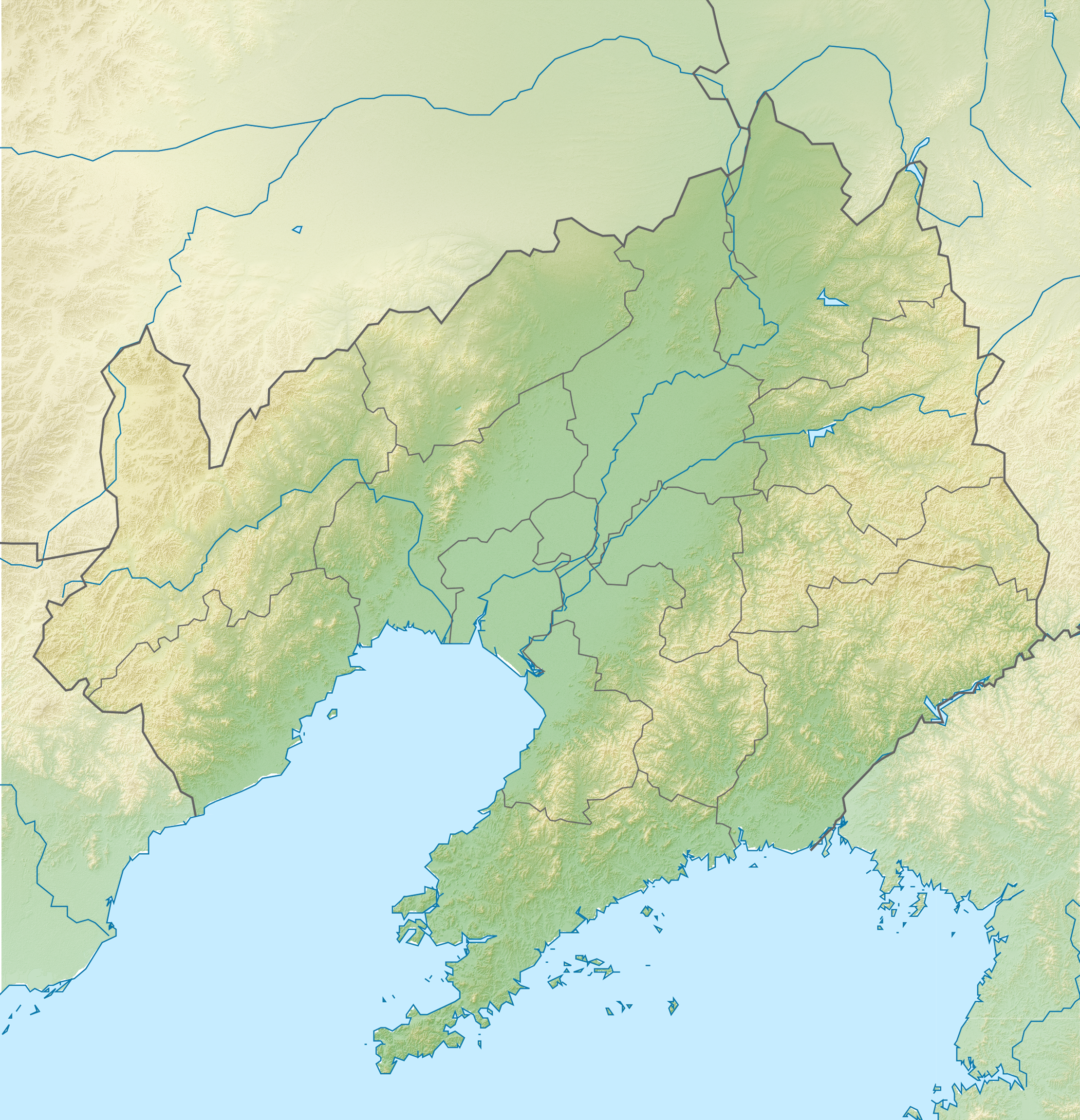
- Location within Liaoning Location within China
- Address: Hunnan District, Shenyang, Liaoning
- Coordinates: 41.737632°N 123.452849°E
- Capacity: 12,000

Tenant
- Liaoning Flying Leopards

The Liaoning Gymnasium is an indoor arena in Shenyang, China. The arena used mainly for basketball and other indoor sports. The facility has a capacity of 10,000 people and was opened in 2007. It is located next to Shenyang Olympic Sports Centre Stadium. Currently it is the host stadium of Liaoning Leopards, a top team in the Chinese Basketball Association (CBA).

== See also ==
- List of indoor arenas in China
