= 2016–17 Dallas Mavericks season =

NBA professional basketball team season

- Head coach: Rick Carlisle
- President: Donnie Nelson
- General manager: Donnie Nelson
- Owner: Mark Cuban
- Arena: American Airlines Center

Results
- Record: 33–49 (.402)
- Place: Division: 5th (Southwest); Conference: 11th (Western)
- Playoff finish: Did not qualify
- Stats at Basketball Reference

Local media
- Television: FS Southwest; KTXA
- Radio: KESN

The 2016–17 Dallas Mavericks season was the 37th season of the franchise in the National Basketball Association (NBA). For the first time since 2013, the Mavs did not qualify for the playoffs. This was their first losing season since 2000.

== Draft ==
Round	Pick	Player	Position	Nationality	School
2	46	A. J. Hammons	C	United States	Purdue

== Roster ==
2016–17 Dallas Mavericks roster
Players

Pos.	No.	Player	Height	Weight	DOB	From
PG	5	J. J. Barea (C)	6 ft 0 in (1.83 m)	185 lb (84 kg)	1984-06-26	Northeastern
SF	40	Harrison Barnes	6 ft 8 in (2.03 m)	225 lb (102 kg)	1992-05-30	North Carolina
SF	9	Nicolás Brussino	6 ft 8 in (2.03 m)	215 lb (98 kg)	1993-03-02	Argentina
SG	30	Seth Curry	6 ft 2 in (1.88 m)	185 lb (84 kg)	1990-08-23	Duke
PG	11	Yogi Ferrell	6 ft 0 in (1.83 m)	180 lb (82 kg)	1993-05-09	Indiana
PF	10	Dorian Finney-Smith	6 ft 8 in (2.03 m)	220 lb (100 kg)	1993-05-04	Florida
C	20	A. J. Hammons	7 ft 0 in (2.13 m)	260 lb (118 kg)	1992-08-27	Purdue
PG	34	Devin Harris	6 ft 3 in (1.91 m)	185 lb (84 kg)	1983-02-27	Wisconsin
SG	14	DeAndre Liggins	6 ft 6 in (1.98 m)	209 lb (95 kg)	1988-03-31	Kentucky
SG	23	Wesley Matthews	6 ft 5 in (1.96 m)	220 lb (100 kg)	1986-10-14	Marquette
C	50	Salah Mejri	7 ft 2 in (2.18 m)	245 lb (111 kg)	1986-06-15	Tunisia
C	3	Nerlens Noel	6 ft 11 in (2.11 m)	228 lb (103 kg)	1994-04-10	Kentucky
PF	41	Dirk Nowitzki (C)	7 ft 0 in (2.13 m)	245 lb (111 kg)	1978-06-19	Germany
C	7	Dwight Powell	6 ft 11 in (2.11 m)	240 lb (109 kg)	1991-07-20	Stanford
PF	19	Jarrod Uthoff	6 ft 9 in (2.06 m)	220 lb (100 kg)	1993-05-19	Iowa

Coaches
Head coach
- Rick Carlisle
Assistant(s)
- Darrell Armstrong
- Kaleb Canales
- Melvin Hunt
- Jamahl Mosley
- Larry Shyatt

Legend
- (DP) Unsigned draft pick
- (FA) Free agent
- (S) Suspended
- (DL) On assignment to D-League affiliate
- Injured

Roster
Updated: 2017-04-04

== Standings ==
=== Division ===
Southwest Division	W	L	PCT	GB	Home	Road	Div	GP
y – San Antonio Spurs	61	21	.744	–	31‍–‍10	30‍–‍11	11–5	82
x – Houston Rockets	55	27	.671	6.0	30‍–‍11	25‍–‍16	10–6	82
x – Memphis Grizzlies	43	39	.524	18.0	24‍–‍17	19‍–‍22	8–8	82
e – New Orleans Pelicans	34	48	.415	27.0	21‍–‍20	13‍–‍28	6–10	82
e – Dallas Mavericks	33	49	.402	28.0	21‍–‍20	12‍–‍29	5–11	82

=== Conference ===
Western Conference
#	Team	W	L	PCT	GB	GP
1	z – Golden State Warriors *	67	15	.817	–	82
2	y – San Antonio Spurs *	61	21	.744	6.0	82
3	x – Houston Rockets	55	27	.671	12.0	82
4	x – Los Angeles Clippers	51	31	.622	16.0	82
5	y – Utah Jazz *	51	31	.622	16.0	82
6	x – Oklahoma City Thunder	47	35	.573	20.0	82
7	x – Memphis Grizzlies	43	39	.524	24.0	82
8	x – Portland Trail Blazers	41	41	.500	26.0	82
9	e – Denver Nuggets	40	42	.488	27.0	82
10	e – New Orleans Pelicans	34	48	.415	33.0	82
11	e – Dallas Mavericks	33	49	.402	34.0	82
12	e – Sacramento Kings	32	50	.390	35.0	82
13	e – Minnesota Timberwolves	31	51	.378	36.0	82
14	e – Los Angeles Lakers	26	56	.317	41.0	82
15	e – Phoenix Suns	24	58	.293	43.0	82

== Game log ==
=== Pre-season ===
2016–17 game log
Total: 2–5 (Home: 2–1; Road: 0–4)
Pre-season: 2–5 (home: 2–1; road: 0–4)

Game	Date	Team	Score	High points	High rebounds	High assists	Location Attendance	Record
1	October 1	@ New Orleans	L 102–116	Justin Anderson (14)	Dwight Powell (7)	four players (3)	CenturyLink Center (Bossier City); 6,752	0–1
2	October 3	Charlotte	W 95–88	Seth Curry (20)	A. J. Hammons (9)	Brussino, Gibson (7)	American Airlines Center; 19,219	1–1
3	October 8	@ Milwaukee	L 74–88	Dwight Powell (15)	Barnes, Powell (7)	five players (2)	Kohl Center (Madison); 10,560	1–2
4	October 11	Oklahoma City	W 114–109	Dwight Powell (16)	Andrew Bogut (11)	Jonathan Gibson (7)	American Airlines Center; 18,329	2–2
5	October 14	@ Phoenix	L 107–112	Deron Williams (17)	Andrew Bogut (10)	Andrew Bogut (4)	Talking Stick Resort Arena; 12,209	2–3
6	October 19	Houston	L 91–106	Wesley Matthews (15)	Andrew Bogut (7)	Curry, Williams (7)	American Airlines Center; 18,988	2–4
7	October 21	@ Denver	L 75–101	Wesley Matthews (10)	Justin Anderson (5)	Gibson, Williams (5)	Pepsi Center; 8,453	2–5

2016–17 season schedule

=== Regular season ===
2016–17 game log
Total: 33–49 (Home: 21–20; Road: 12–29)
October: 0–3 (home: 0–1; road: 0–2)

Game	Date	Team	Score	High points	High rebounds	High assists	Location Attendance	Record
1	October 26	@ Indiana	L 121–130 (OT)	Deron Williams (25)	Harrison Barnes (9)	Deron Williams (7)	Bankers Life Fieldhouse; 17,923	0–1
2	October 28	Houston	L 98–106	Harrison Barnes (31)	Andrew Bogut (12)	J. J. Barea (5)	American Airlines Center; 20,163	0–2
3	October 30	@ Houston	L 92–93	Wesley Matthews (25)	Andrew Bogut (14)	J. J. Barea (5)	Toyota Center; 18,055	0–3

November : 3–11 (home: 2–4; road: 1–7)

Game	Date	Team	Score	High points	High rebounds	High assists	Location Attendance	Record
4	November 2	@ Utah	L 81–97	Harrison Barnes (14)	Andrew Bogut (9)	Deron Williams (9)	Vivint Smart Home Arena; 19,318	0–4
5	November 4	Portland	L 95–105	J. J. Barea (23)	Harrison Barnes (10)	Barea, Williams (6)	American Airlines Center; 19,475	0–5
6	November 6	Milwaukee	W 86–75 (OT)	Harrison Barnes (34)	Andrew Bogut (16)	J. J. Barea (5)	American Airlines Center; 19,345	1–5
7	November 8	@ LA Lakers	W 109–97	Harrison Barnes (31)	Andrew Bogut (8)	J. J. Barea (8)	Staples Center; 18,997	2–5
8	November 9	@ Golden State	L 95–116	Harrison Barnes (25)	Dwight Powell (9)	Seth Curry (9)	Oracle Arena; 19,596	2–6
9	November 14	@ New York	L 77–93	Harrison Barnes (20)	Andrew Bogut (9)	J. J. Barea (4)	Madison Square Garden; 19,812	2–7
10	November 16	@ Boston	L 83–90	Harrison Barnes (28)	Dwight Powell (8)	J. J. Barea (6)	TD Garden; 18,624	2–8
11	November 18	Memphis	L 64–80	Harrison Barnes (15)	Andrew Bogut (10)	Jonathan Gibson (3)	American Airlines Center; 19,715	2–9
12	November 19	@ Orlando	L 87–95	Jonathan Gibson (26)	Andrew Bogut (8)	Seth Curry (4)	Amway Center; 18,846	2–10
13	November 21	@ San Antonio	L 91–96	Seth Curry (23)	Salah Mejri (11)	Curry, Matthews (4)	AT&T Center; 18,418	2–11
14	November 23	LA Clippers	L 104–124	Harrison Barnes (22)	Andrew Bogut (12)	Andrew Bogut (6)	American Airlines Center; 20,042	2–12
15	November 25	@ Cleveland	L 90–128	Dirk Nowitzki (15)	Andrew Bogut (11)	Brussino, Williams (5)	Quicken Loans Arena; 20,562	2–13
16	November 27	New Orleans	W 91–81	Harrison Barnes (23)	Andrew Bogut (14)	Barnes, Williams (4)	American Airlines Center; 19,302	3–13
17	November 30	San Antonio	L 87–94	Wesley Matthews (26)	Andrew Bogut (12)	Bogut, Williams (5)	American Airlines Center; 19,245	3–14

December : 7–10 (home: 4–4; road: 3–6)

Game	Date	Team	Score	High points	High rebounds	High assists	Location Attendance	Record
18	December 1	@ Charlotte	L 87–97	Harrison Barnes (17)	Salah Mejri (11)	Deron Williams (8)	Spectrum Center; 14,471	3–15
19	December 3	Chicago	W 107–82	Wesley Matthews (26)	Andrew Bogut (11)	Deron Williams (15)	American Airlines Center; 19,857	4–15
20	December 5	Charlotte	L 101–109	Harrison Barnes (29)	Barnes, Powell (7)	Deron Williams (13)	American Airlines Center; 19,228	4–16
21	December 7	Sacramento	L 89–120	Deron Williams (20)	Salah Mejri (7)	Deron Williams (6)	American Airlines Center; 19,711	4–17
22	December 9	Indiana	W 111–103	Wesley Matthews (26)	Barnes, Finney-Smith (8)	Curry, Williams (6)	American Airlines Center; 19,486	5–17
23	December 10	@ Houston	L 87–109	Wesley Matthews (26)	Dwight Powell (6)	Deron Williams (6)	Toyota Center; 15,761	5–18
24	December 12	Denver	W 112–92	Wesley Matthews (25)	Dorian Finney-Smith (8)	Deron Williams (8)	American Airlines Center; 19,425	6–18
25	December 14	Detroit	L 85–95	Harrison Barnes (19)	Salah Mejri (8)	Deron Williams (5)	American Airlines Center; 19,687	6–19
26	December 16	@ Utah	L 100–103	Harrison Barnes (21)	Curry, Mejri (5)	Deron Williams (7)	Vivint Smart Home Arena; 18,721	6–20
27	December 18	Sacramento	W 99–79	Dorian Finney-Smith (17)	Harrison Barnes (9)	Deron Williams (7)	American Airlines Center; 19,504	7–20
28	December 19	@ Denver	L 107–117	Deron Williams (23)	Dwight Powell (9)	Deron Williams (8)	Pepsi Center; 12,581	7–21
29	December 21	@ Portland	W 96–95	Harrison Barnes (28)	Dwight Powell (8)	Deron Williams (5)	Moda Center; 19,393	8–21
30	December 23	@ LA Clippers	W 90–88	Harrison Barnes (24)	Salah Mejri (8)	Deron Williams (9)	Staples Center; 19,060	9–21
31	December 26	@ New Orleans	L 104–111	Deron Williams (24)	Harrison Barnes (7)	Deron Williams (9)	Smoothie King Center; 15,764	9–22
32	December 27	Houston	L 107–123	Harrison Barnes (21)	Justin Anderson (8)	Deron Williams (6)	American Airlines Center; 20,425	9–23
33	December 29	@ LA Lakers	W 101–89	Wesley Matthews (20)	Harrison Barnes (9)	Deron Williams (11)	Staples Center; 18,997	10–23
34	December 30	@ Golden State	L 99–108	Harrison Barnes (25)	Dwight Powell (13)	Curry, Jackson (5)	Oracle Arena; 19,596	10–24

January : 8–6 (home: 5–3; road: 3–3)

Game	Date	Team	Score	High points	High rebounds	High assists	Location Attendance	Record
35	January 3	Washington	W 113–105	Deron Williams (21)	Dirk Nowitzki (9)	Deron Williams (6)	American Airlines Center; 19,318	11–24
36	January 5	Phoenix	L 95–102	Deron Williams (20)	Dirk Nowitzki (7)	Deron Williams (6)	American Airlines Center; 19,570	11–25
37	January 7	Atlanta	L 82–97	Harrison Barnes (21)	Andrew Bogut (11)	J. J. Barea (7)	American Airlines Center; 19,655	11–26
38	January 9	@ Minnesota	L 92–101	Harrison Barnes (30)	Dirk Nowitzki (5)	Deron Williams (7)	Target Center; 9,625	11–27
39	January 12	@ Phoenix	W 113–108	Deron Williams (23)	Salah Mejri (7)	Deron Williams (12)	Mexico City Arena; 19,874	12–27
40	January 15	Minnesota	W 98–87	Wesley Matthews (19)	Salah Mejri (8)	Deron Williams (10)	American Airlines Center; 19,655	13–27
41	January 17	@ Chicago	W 99–98	Harrison Barnes (20)	Dirk Nowitzki (10)	Deron Williams (9)	United Center; 21,294	14–27
42	January 19	@ Miami	L 95–99	Dirk Nowitzki (19)	Harrison Barnes (7)	Deron Williams (9)	American Airlines Arena; 19,600	14–28
43	January 20	Utah	L 107–112 (OT)	Harrison Barnes (19)	Dirk Nowitzki (10)	Deron Williams (8)	American Airlines Center; 19,421	14–29
44	January 22	LA Lakers	W 122–73	Justin Anderson (19)	Finney-Smith, Powell (7)	Deron Williams (8)	American Airlines Center; 19,484	15–29
45	January 25	New York	W 103–95	Harrison Barnes (23)	three players (5)	Deron Williams (7)	American Airlines Center; 19,750	16–29
46	January 26	@ Oklahoma City	L 98–109	Harrison Barnes (31)	Brussino, Mejri (6)	Curry, Jackson (4)	Chesapeake Energy Arena; 18,203	16–30
47	January 29	@ San Antonio	W 105–101	Seth Curry (24)	Curry, Nowitzki (10)	Yogi Ferrell (7)	AT&T Center; 18,418	17–30
48	January 30	Cleveland	W 104–97	Harrison Barnes (24)	Harrison Barnes (11)	Devin Harris (5)	American Airlines Center; 20,202	18–30

February : 6–5 (home: 5–2; road: 1–3)

Game	Date	Team	Score	High points	High rebounds	High assists	Location Attendance	Record
49	February 1	Philadelphia	W 113–95	Seth Curry (22)	Salah Mejri (17)	Seth Curry (6)	American Airlines Center; 19,263	19–30
50	February 3	@ Portland	W 108–104	Yogi Ferrell (32)	Harrison Barnes (7)	Yogi Ferrell (5)	Moda Center; 19,393	20–30
51	February 6	@ Denver	L 87–110	Curry, Ferrell (15)	Wesley Matthews (7)	Wesley Matthews (8)	Pepsi Center; 13,047	20–31
52	February 7	Portland	L 113–114	Harrison Barnes (26)	Devin Harris (7)	Wesley Matthews (5)	American Airlines Center; 19,526	20–32
53	February 9	Utah	W 112–105 (OT)	Harrison Barnes (31)	Dirk Nowitzki (7)	Ferrell, Matthews (5)	American Airlines Center; 19,883	21–32
54	February 11	Orlando	W 112–80	Wesley Matthews (20)	Salah Mejri (15)	Yogi Ferrell (7)	American Airlines Center; 20,052	22–32
55	February 13	Boston	L 98–111	Yogi Ferrell (20)	Salah Mejri (10)	Curry, Ferrell (5)	American Airlines Center; 20,159	22–33
56	February 15	@ Detroit	L 91–98	Dirk Nowitzki (24)	Dirk Nowitzki (10)	Deron Williams (6)	The Palace of Auburn Hills; 13,549	22–34
57	February 24	@ Minnesota	L 84–97	Seth Curry (31)	Nowitzki, Mejri (10)	Yogi Ferrell (4)	Target Center; 15,948	22–35
58	February 25	New Orleans	W 96–83	Harrison Barnes (19)	Nerlens Noel (10)	Seth Curry (8)	American Airlines Center; 20,411	23–35
59	February 27	Miami	W 96–89	Seth Curry (29)	Dirk Nowitzki (12)	Yogi Ferrell (5)	American Airlines Center; 19,539	24–35

March : 7–9 (home: 5–4; road: 2–5)

Game	Date	Team	Score	High points	High rebounds	High assists	Location Attendance	Record
60	March 1	@ Atlanta	L 95–100	Harrison Barnes (25)	Dirk Nowitzki (10)	Yogi Ferrell (9)	Philips Arena; 12,483	24–36
61	March 3	Memphis	W 104–100	Seth Curry (24)	Nerlens Noel (17)	Devin Harris (6)	American Airlines Center; 19,480	25–36
62	March 5	Oklahoma City	W 104–89	Seth Curry (22)	Dirk Nowitzki (12)	Devin Harris (6)	American Airlines Center; 20,232	26–36
63	March 7	LA Lakers	W 122–111	Dirk Nowitzki (25)	Dirk Nowitzki (11)	Yogi Ferrell (7)	American Airlines Center; 20,484	27–36
64	March 10	Brooklyn	W 105–96	Harrison Barnes (21)	Dwight Powell (8)	Seth Curry (4)	American Airlines Center; 20,022	28–36
65	March 11	Phoenix	L 98–100	Barnes, Nowitzki (23)	Dirk Nowitzki (11)	J. J. Barea (4)	American Airlines Center; 20,324	28–37
66	March 13	@ Toronto	L 78–100	Harrison Barnes (18)	Dwight Powell (10)	Yogi Ferrell (6)	Air Canada Centre; 19,800	28–38
67	March 15	@ Washington	W 112–107	Harrison Barnes (22)	Barnes, Brussino (9)	J. J. Barea (13)	Verizon Center; 17,844	29–38
68	March 17	@ Philadelphia	L 74–116	Dwight Powell (14)	Manny Harris (6)	J. J. Barea (4)	Wells Fargo Center; 17,642	29–39
69	March 19	@ Brooklyn	W 111–104	Dirk Nowitzki (23)	Dirk Nowitzki (9)	J. J. Barea (7)	Barclays Center; 14,045	30–39
70	March 21	Golden State	L 87–112	Dirk Nowitzki (16)	Dirk Nowitzki (9)	J. J. Barea (6)	American Airlines Center; 20,453	30–40
71	March 23	LA Clippers	W 97–95	Seth Curry (23)	Nerlens Noel (12)	Wesley Matthews (6)	American Airlines Center; 19,703	31–40
72	March 25	Toronto	L 86–94	Harrison Barnes (23)	Nerlens Noel (8)	Wesley Matthews (5)	American Airlines Center; 19,934	31–41
73	March 27	Oklahoma City	L 91–92	Matthews, Noel (15)	Noel, Nowitzki (8)	J. J. Barea (8)	American Airlines Center; 19,970	31–42
74	March 29	@ New Orleans	L 118–121	Dirk Nowitzki (23)	Harrison Barnes (8)	J. J. Barea (11)	Smoothie King Center; 16,000	31–43
75	March 31	@ Memphis	L 90–99	three players (13)	Dirk Nowitzki (12)	Wesley Matthews (7)	FedExForum; 17,317	31–44

April : 2–5 (home: 0–2; road: 2–3)

Game	Date	Team	Score	High points	High rebounds	High assists	Location Attendance	Record
76	April 2	@ Milwaukee	W 109–105	Harrison Barnes (31)	Dirk Nowitzki (5)	Barea, Matthews (6)	BMO Harris Bradley Center; 18,717	32–44
77	April 4	@ Sacramento	L 87–98	Nicolás Brussino (13)	Nerlens Noel (10)	Brussino, Ferrell (5)	Golden 1 Center; 17,608	32–45
78	April 5	@ LA Clippers	L 101–112	Harrison Barnes (15)	Salah Mejri (9)	Ferrell, Matthews (6)	Staples Center; 19,060	32–46
79	April 7	San Antonio	L 89–102	Dwight Powell (12)	Nerlens Noel (9)	J. J. Barea (8)	American Airlines Center; 20,133	32–47
80	April 9	@ Phoenix	L 111–124	Ferrell, Powell (21)	Dorian Finney-Smith (11)	Nicolás Brussino (5)	Talking Stick Resort Arena; 18,055	32–48
81	April 11	Denver	L 91–109	Dirk Nowitzki (21)	Dirk Nowitzki (8)	J. J. Barea (9)	American Airlines Center; 20,333	32–49
82	April 12	@ Memphis	W 100–93	Brussino, Harris (15)	three players (7)	Devin Harris (8)	FedExForum; 16,274	33–49

2016–17 season schedule

== Player statistics ==
=== Regular season ===
Player	POS	GP	GS	MP	REB	AST	STL	BLK	PTS	MPG	RPG	APG	SPG	BPG	PPG
Dorian Finney-Smith	PF	81	35	1,642	222	67	52	25	350	20.3	2.7	.8	.6	.3	4.3
Harrison Barnes	PF	79	79	2,803	394	116	65	15	1,518	35.5	5.0	1.5	.8	.2	19.2
Dwight Powell	C	77	3	1,333	306	49	61	39	516	17.3	4.0	.6	.8	.5	6.7
Wesley Matthews	SG	73	73	2,495	259	210	77	15	986	34.2	3.5	2.9	1.1	.2	13.5
Salah Mejri	C	73	11	905	308	14	32	61	213	12.4	4.2	.2	.4	.8	2.9
Seth Curry	PG	70	42	2,029	179	189	79	7	898	29.0	2.6	2.7	1.1	.1	12.8
Devin Harris	PG	65	0	1,087	127	136	43	7	437	16.7	2.0	2.1	.7	.1	6.7
Dirk Nowitzki	PF	54	54	1,424	353	82	30	38	769	26.4	6.5	1.5	.6	.7	14.2
Nicolás Brussino	SG	54	2	521	95	47	17	8	150	9.6	1.8	.9	.3	.1	2.8
Justin Anderson^{†}	SF	51	2	710	149	32	28	16	329	13.9	2.9	.6	.5	.3	6.5
Deron Williams^{†}	PG	40	40	1,171	102	274	25	2	522	29.3	2.6	6.9	.6	.1	13.1
Yogi Ferrell^{†}	PG	36	29	1,046	99	155	40	7	408	29.1	2.8	4.3	1.1	.2	11.3
J. J. Barea	PG	35	6	771	84	193	14	1	381	22.0	2.4	5.5	.4	.0	10.9
Andrew Bogut^{†}	C	26	21	582	218	49	13	25	79	22.4	8.4	1.9	.5	1.0	3.0
Nerlens Noel^{†}	C	22	12	483	150	20	22	24	188	22.0	6.8	.9	1.0	1.1	8.5
A. J. Hammons	C	22	0	163	36	4	1	13	48	7.4	1.6	.2	.0	.6	2.2
Jonathan Gibson	PG	17	0	231	22	26	8	0	106	13.6	1.3	1.5	.5	.0	6.2
Jarrod Uthoff	PF	9	0	115	22	9	2	4	40	12.8	2.4	1.0	.2	.4	4.4
Pierre Jackson	PG	8	1	84	9	19	2	0	35	10.5	1.1	2.4	.3	.0	4.4
Quincy Acy^{†}	PF	6	0	48	8	0	0	0	13	8.0	1.3	.0	.0	.0	2.2
Quinn Cook^{†}	PG	5	0	77	3	12	1	0	27	15.4	.6	2.4	.2	.0	5.4
Manny Harris	SG	4	0	25	9	2	0	0	8	6.3	2.3	.5	.0	.0	2.0
Ben Bentil	PF	3	0	10	2	0	0	0	0	3.3	.7	.0	.0	.0	.0
DeAndre Liggins^{†}	SG	1	0	25	7	0	2	0	8	25.0	7.0	.0	2.0	.0	8.0

- ^{†} Denotes player spent time with another team in the season. Stats reflect time with the Mavericks only.

== Transactions ==
=== Overview ===
Players Added

Via draft

- A. J. Hammons

Via Trade

- Andrew Bogut

Via free agency

Players Lost

Via trade

Via free agency

=== Trades ===
July 7, 2016	To Dallas Mavericks Andrew Bogut; Future second-round draft pick	To Golden State Warriors Future second-round draft pick
July 7, 2016	To Dallas Mavericks Rights to Stanko Barać	To Indiana Pacers Jeremy Evans; Rights to Emir Preldžić
February 23, 2017	To Dallas Mavericks Nerlens Noel	To Philadelphia 76ers Andrew Bogut; Justin Anderson; Future first-round draft pick

=== Free agents ===
==== Re-signed ====
Player	Signed
Dirk Nowitzki	Signed 2-year contract worth $50 million
Dwight Powell	Signed 4-year contract worth $37 million
Deron Williams	Signed 1-year contract worth $10 million

==== Additions ====
Player	Signed	Former Team
Quincy Acy	Signed 2-year contract worth the veteran minimum	Sacramento Kings
Harrison Barnes	Signed 4-year contract worth $94 million	Golden State Warriors
Ben Bentil	Signed 10-day contract	Fort Wayne Mad Ants
Nicolás Brussino	Signed 3-year contract	(Argentina) Club Atlético Peñarol
Kyle Collinsworth	Signed 2-year contract	Brigham Young Cougars
Quinn Cook	Signed 10-day contract	Canton Charge
Jaleel Cousins		South Florida Bulls
Seth Curry	Signed 2-year contract worth $6 million	Sacramento Kings
Yogi Ferrell	Signed two 10-day contracts / 2-year deal worth $1.6 million	Long Island Nets
Dorian Finney-Smith	Signed 3-year contract	Florida Gators
Jonathan Gibson		(China) Qingdao DoubleStar Eagles
Manny Harris	Signed 10-day contract	Texas Legends
Keith Hornsby		Louisiana State Tigers
Pierre Jackson	Signed in December and two 10-day contracts in January	Texas Legends
DeAndre Liggins		Cleveland Cavaliers
Jarrod Uthoff	Signed two 10-day contracts / 2-year deal worth $1.5 million	Fort Wayne Mad Ants
Jameel Warney		Stony Brook Seawolves
C. J. Williams		(France) JDA Dijon Basket

==== Subtractions ====
Player	Reason Left	New Team
Quincy Acy	Waived	Texas Legends
Ben Bentil	10-day contract expired	Fort Wayne Mad Ants
Kyle Collinsworth	Waived	Texas Legends
Quinn Cook	10-day contract expired	Canton Charge
Jaleel Cousins	Waived	Texas Legends
Raymond Felton	Signed 1-year contract worth the veteran minimum	Los Angeles Clippers
Jonathan Gibson	Waived	(China) Anhui Wenyi
Manny Harris	Waived	Texas Legends
Keith Hornsby	Waived	Texas Legends
Pierre Jackson	Waived in January and again after two 10-day contracts	Texas Legends
David Lee	Signed 2-year contract worth $3.2 million	San Antonio Spurs
JaVale McGee	Waived	Golden State Warriors
Zaza Pachulia	Signed 1-year contract worth $2.9 million	Golden State Warriors
Chandler Parsons	Signed 4-year contract worth $94 million	Memphis Grizzlies
Jameel Warney	Waived	Texas Legends
C. J. Williams	Waived	Texas Legends
Deron Williams	Waived	Cleveland Cavaliers

== Awards ==
Player	Award	Awarded
Yogi Ferrell	Western Conference Rookie of the Month (February)	March 3, 2017
