= Andrew Bogut =

Australian basketball player (born 1984)

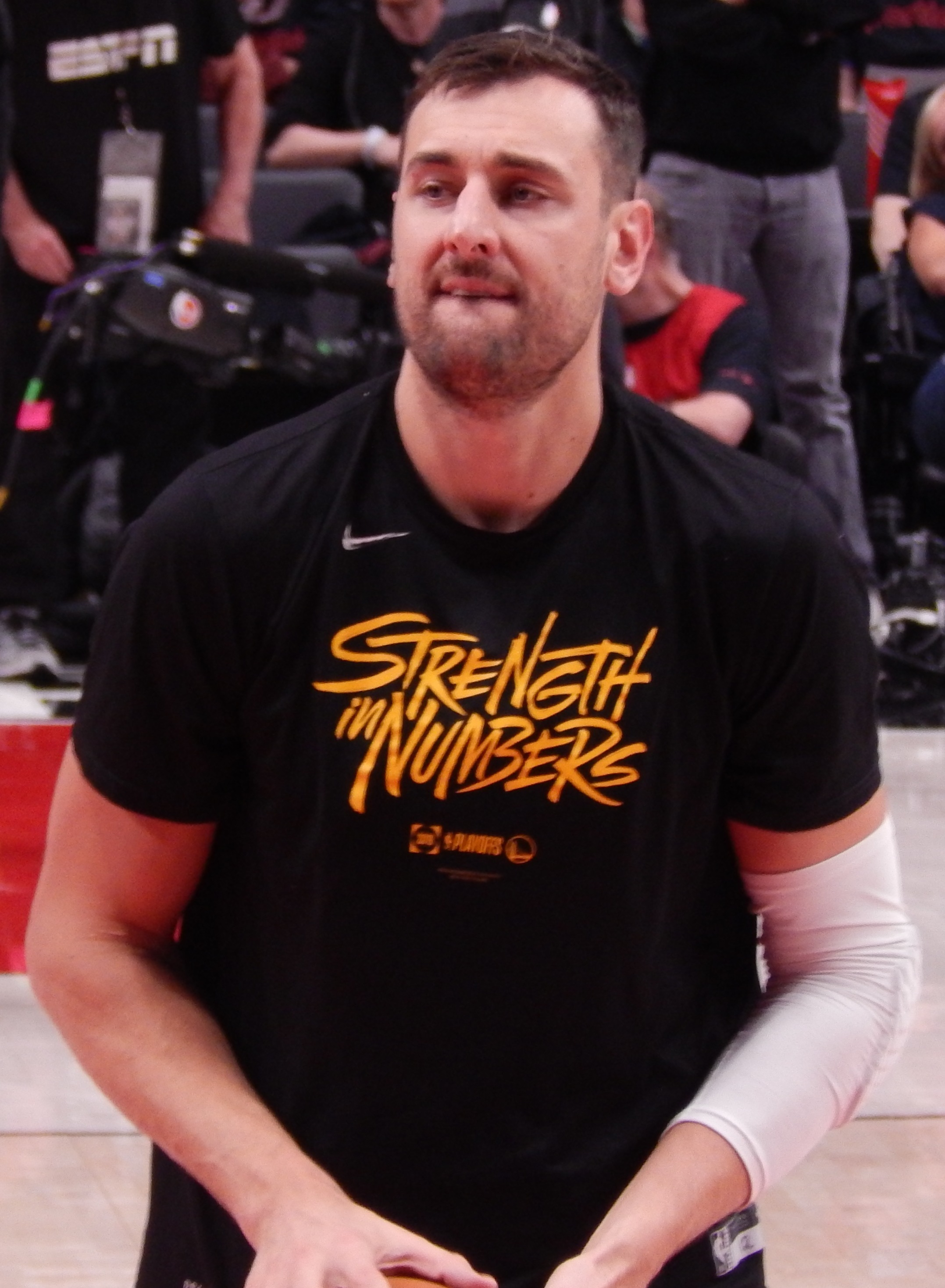
- Bogut with the Golden State Warriors in 2019

Sydney Kings
- Title: Assistant coach
- League: NBL

Personal information
- Born: 28 November 1984 (age 41) Melbourne, Victoria, Australia
- Listed height: 7 ft 0 in (2.13 m)
- Listed weight: 260 lb (118 kg)

Career information
- High school: St John's Regional College (Melbourne, Victoria); Lake Ginninderra (Canberra, Australian Capital Territory)
- College: Utah (2003–2005)
- NBA draft: 2005: 1st round, 1st overall pick
- Drafted by: Milwaukee Bucks
- Playing career: 2005–2020
- Position: Center / power forward
- Number: 6, 12, 66
- Coaching career: 2025–present

Career history

Playing
- 2005–2012: Milwaukee Bucks
- 2012–2016: Golden State Warriors
- 2016–2017: Dallas Mavericks
- 2017: Cleveland Cavaliers
- 2017–2018: Los Angeles Lakers
- 2018–2020: Sydney Kings
- 2019: Golden State Warriors

Coaching
- 2025–present: Sydney Kings (assistant)

Career highlights
- As player: NBA champion (2015); All-NBA Third Team (2010); NBA All-Defensive Second Team (2015); NBA All-Rookie First Team (2006); NBA blocks leader (2011); NBL Most Valuable Player (2019); All-NBL First Team (2019); All-NBL Second Team (2020); NBL Best Defensive Player (2019); Gaze Medal winner (2016); National college player of the year (2005); Consensus first-team All-American (2005); Pete Newell Big Man Award (2005); MWC Player of the Year (2005); MWC Freshman of the Year (2004); No. 4 retired by Utah Utes; FIBA Under-19 World Cup MVP (2003); As assistant coach: NBL champion (2026)

Career NBA statistics
- Points: 6,808 (9.6 ppg)
- Rebounds: 6,112 (8.7 rpg)
- Blocks: 1,091 (1.5 bpg)
- Stats at NBA.com
- Stats at Basketball Reference
- FIBA Hall of Fame
Medals
Men's basketball
Representing Australia
FIBA Oceania Championship
| Gold medal – first place | 2015 Australia/New Zealand |
FIBA U19 World Cup
| Gold medal – first place | 2003 Greece | Team |

Andrew Michael Bogut (born 28 November 1984) is an Australian professional basketball coach and former player who is an assistant coach with the Sydney Kings of the National Basketball League (NBL).

Bogut spent the majority of his career in the National Basketball Association (NBA). The 7-foot (213 cm) tall center was selected by the Milwaukee Bucks with the first overall pick in the 2005 NBA draft. He earned All-NBA Third Team honors with the Bucks in 2010. Bogut was traded to the Golden State Warriors in 2012 and was named NBA All-Defensive Second Team in 2015, when he won an NBA championship with the Warriors.

Bogut played college basketball for two years with the Utah Utes, and earned national player of the year honors in 2005. He declared for the NBA draft, and became the first Australian to be the NBA's first overall pick. In his first year with the Bucks, Bogut was named to the NBA All-Rookie First Team in 2006. He earned all-league honors in 2010 after averaging a career-high 15.9 points along with 10.2 rebounds per game. Bogut missed most of 2011–12 with an ankle injury, when he was traded to Golden State. After the Warriors won the NBA Finals in 2015, Bogut helped the Warriors win an NBA-record 73 games in 2015–16 and made his second Finals. Bogut was traded to the Dallas Mavericks, where he played briefly before other short stints with the Cleveland Cavaliers and Los Angeles Lakers. In 2018, Bogut returned to his home country to play for the Sydney Kings and won the NBL Most Valuable Player Award. Following the 2018–19 NBL season, he signed back with the Warriors and made his third Finals in 2019. Bogut then returned to the Kings for a second season before retiring in 2020.

Described as one of the leading faces of Australian basketball, Bogut has been credited for serving as a cornerstone of the Australian national team, for paving the way for an entire generation of Australian players in the NBA and in playing a leading role in re-vitalizing the Australian NBL.

== Early life ==
Bogut was born in Melbourne on 28 November 1984. His parents, Michael and Anne, immigrated to Australia from Croatia in the 1970s, with his father from Osijek and his mother from Karlovac. Bogut grew up playing Australian rules football and tennis in addition to basketball. As a child, he patterned his basketball game after Toni Kukoč, a Croatian NBA player who spent the majority of the 1990s playing for the Chicago Bulls. As a 15-year-old, Bogut was cut from the Victoria junior state representative team. In response to this setback, he began to improve his game with the help of Siniša Marković, a professional basketball player from Yugoslavia. Bogut's emergence began after joining the Australian Institute of Sport (AIS) in 2002. He competed for the AIS men's team in the South East Australian Basketball League (SEABL) in 2002 and 2003, helping the AIS win the East Conference title in his first season and won the SEABL East MVP in his second season. Bogut later joined the U-19 Australian junior national team, and was named the most valuable player of the 2003 FIBA Under-19 World Cup, in Greece, after leading the Emus to the title. In eight games, he averaged 26.3 points, 17 rebounds, 2.5 assists and 1.5 blocks per game, and he shot 61 percent from the field and 74 percent from the free throw line. One of the highlights of his MVP conquest was a 22-point, 18-rebound performance, in a 106–85 victory over the US, in the quarterfinals of the medal round.

== College career ==
As a freshman at Utah in 2003–04, Bogut averaged 12.5 points and 9.9 rebounds in 33 games. He subsequently earned CollegeInsider.com All-Freshman Team honours, Mountain West Conference Freshman of the Year, second-team All-Mountain West Conference, and NABC second-team All-District 13.

As a sophomore in 2004–05, Bogut started all 35 games for the Utes, leading them to a 29–6 record, the Sweet 16 of the NCAA Tournament, and a Mountain West Conference championship. He led the nation with 26 double-doubles and scored in double figures in 37 consecutive games dating back to the final two games of the 2003–04 season to have the sixth-longest streak in the country. He ranked 19th in the NCAA in scoring (20.4 ppg), second in rebounding (12.2 rpg) and eighth in field goal percentage (62.0), and led the Mountain West Conference in scoring, rebounding and field goal percentage. He became one of 31 Utah players all-time to score 1,000 points in his career, but just the third to reach that mark in two seasons. He was named the 2004–05 national player of the year by both ESPN.com and Basketball Times, and earned Associated Press first-team All-American and leading vote getter, becoming the 11th Ute all-time to earn All-America honours. Bogut also earned Naismith College Player of the Year honours and the John R. Wooden Award. He later had his No. 4 jersey retired by Utah.

== Professional career ==
=== Milwaukee Bucks (2005–2012) ===
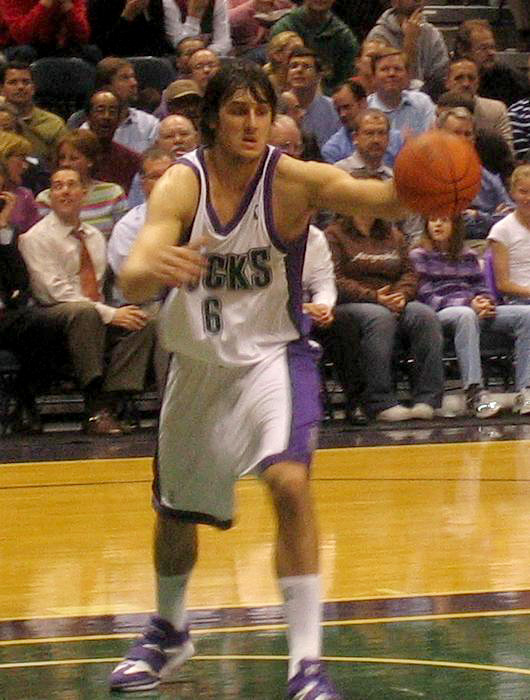
Bogut in 2005

Bogut was selected by the Milwaukee Bucks with the first overall pick in the 2005 NBA draft, becoming the first Australian player and the second Utah player (the first being Bill McGill) to be drafted number one overall. As a rookie in 2005–06, he earned All-Rookie First Team honours and finished third in votes for the NBA Rookie of the Year Award. He played in all 82 regular season games for the Bucks in his first season, averaging 9.4 points and 7.0 rebounds per game.

Bogut's second season in the league was cut short after he sprained his left foot and was put on the injured reserve for the final 15 games. He had previously played in 153 consecutive games. He improved his numbers in 2006–07 to 12.3 points and 8.8 rebounds per game.

In the 2007–08 NBA season, Bogut set career-highs in points (14.3), rebounds (9.8), blocks (1.7), steals (0.8) and minutes (34.9) per game. He tallied a career-high 29 points against the Phoenix Suns in December and finished 9th in the NBA in blocks, 11th in rebounding and 12th in double-doubles (38). He started in 78 games for the Bucks, missing just four games through injury.

In the 2008 offseason, Bogut signed a five-year, $60 million extension that would keep him under contract through the 2013–14 season. The deal also had $12.5 million in possible incentives.

Bogut appeared in just 36 games for the Bucks in 2008–09, missing the final 31 games of the season with a stress fracture in his lower back. He faced more time on the sidelines during the 2009–10 season due to a strained ligament and bruise in his left leg. On 3 April 2010, near the end of a breakout season, Bogut suffered a major injury. That night, in a game against the Phoenix Suns at the Bradley Center, Bogut had a chance to score on a fast break attempt. As he went up, Amar'e Stoudemire appeared to make some contact with Bogut and he lost his balance while completing the dunk. He hung onto the rim for a brief moment to try to right himself but could not, and fell at an awkward angle. Placing his right arm out to break the fall, Bogut landed with all of his weight on top of his wrist and his arm twisted as he landed. The next day, Bogut was diagnosed with a broken hand, dislocated elbow and sprained wrist, injuries that kept him out of for the remainder of the 2009–10 season. In what was a breakout season for Bogut, he finished with averages of 15.9 points, 10.2 rebounds and 2.5 blocks per game, earning All-NBA Third Team honours, becoming first Bucks player named to the squad since Michael Redd in 2003–04. Bogut helped the Bucks to a 46–36 record, their most wins since going 50–32 in 2000–01, and their first playoff appearance since 2006.

Bogut returned to the Bucks' line-up in 2010–11, playing in 65 games and leading the league in blocks with 2.6 per game.

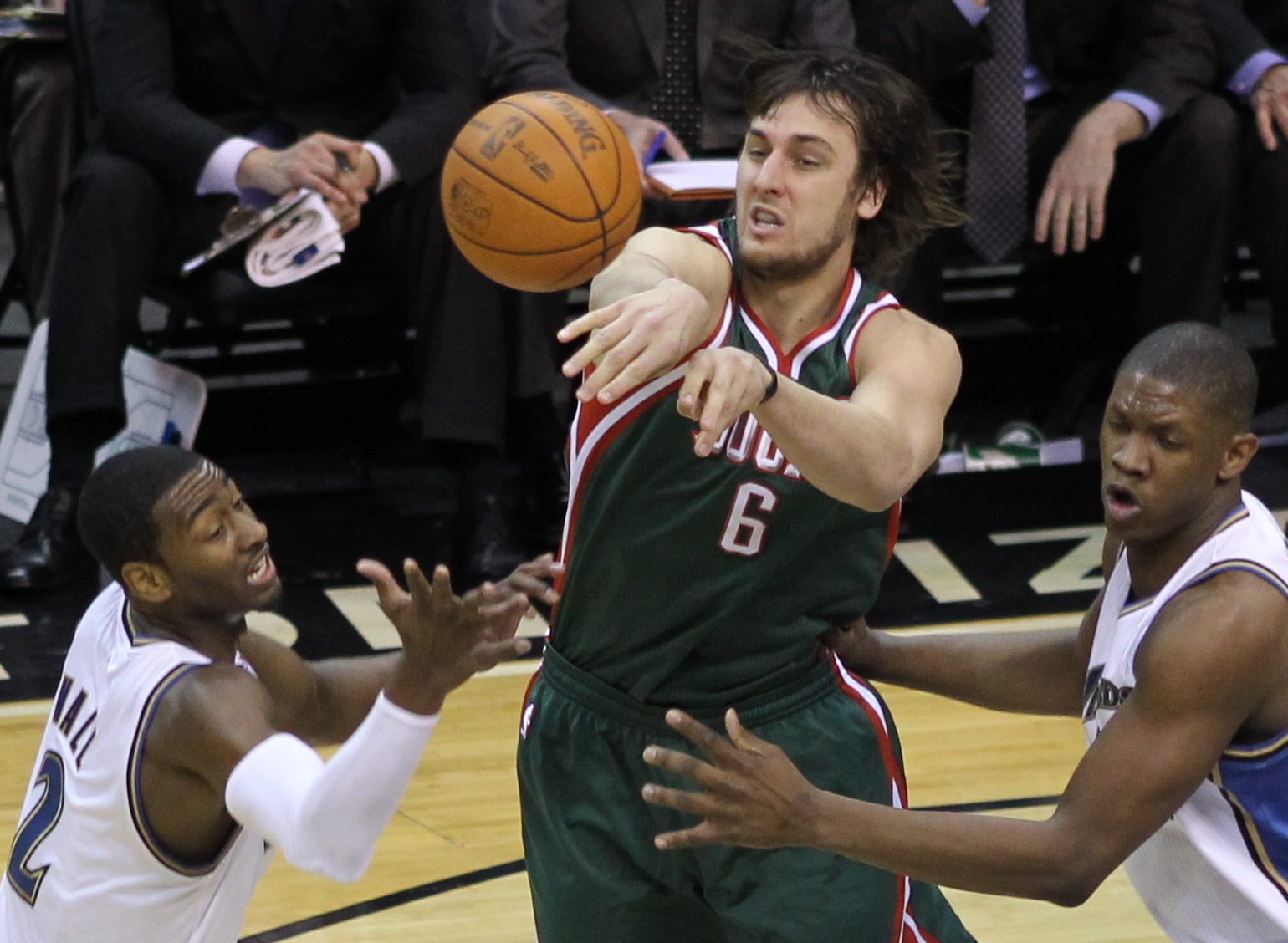
Bogut in 2011

During the 2011 NBA lockout, Bogut chose to return home to Australia and play in the NBL for the 2011–12 season. He was linked to the Gold Coast Blaze, Adelaide 36ers and the team he supported when growing up, the Sydney Kings. Ultimately, he chose the Kings (who finished last in 2010–11), but the insurance to cover his remaining $39m contract with the Bucks could not be resolved, leaving the Kings and the NBL without his on-court services. Following the breakdown in contract negotiations over the insurance money, Bogut stated he would like to join the Kings coaching staff in a bid not only to help the club, but help raise the NBL's profile. This, however, did not occur and he later returned to the Bucks following the conclusion of the lockout. On 25 January 2012, he fractured his ankle, ruling him out for the rest of the season.

=== Golden State Warriors (2012–2016) ===
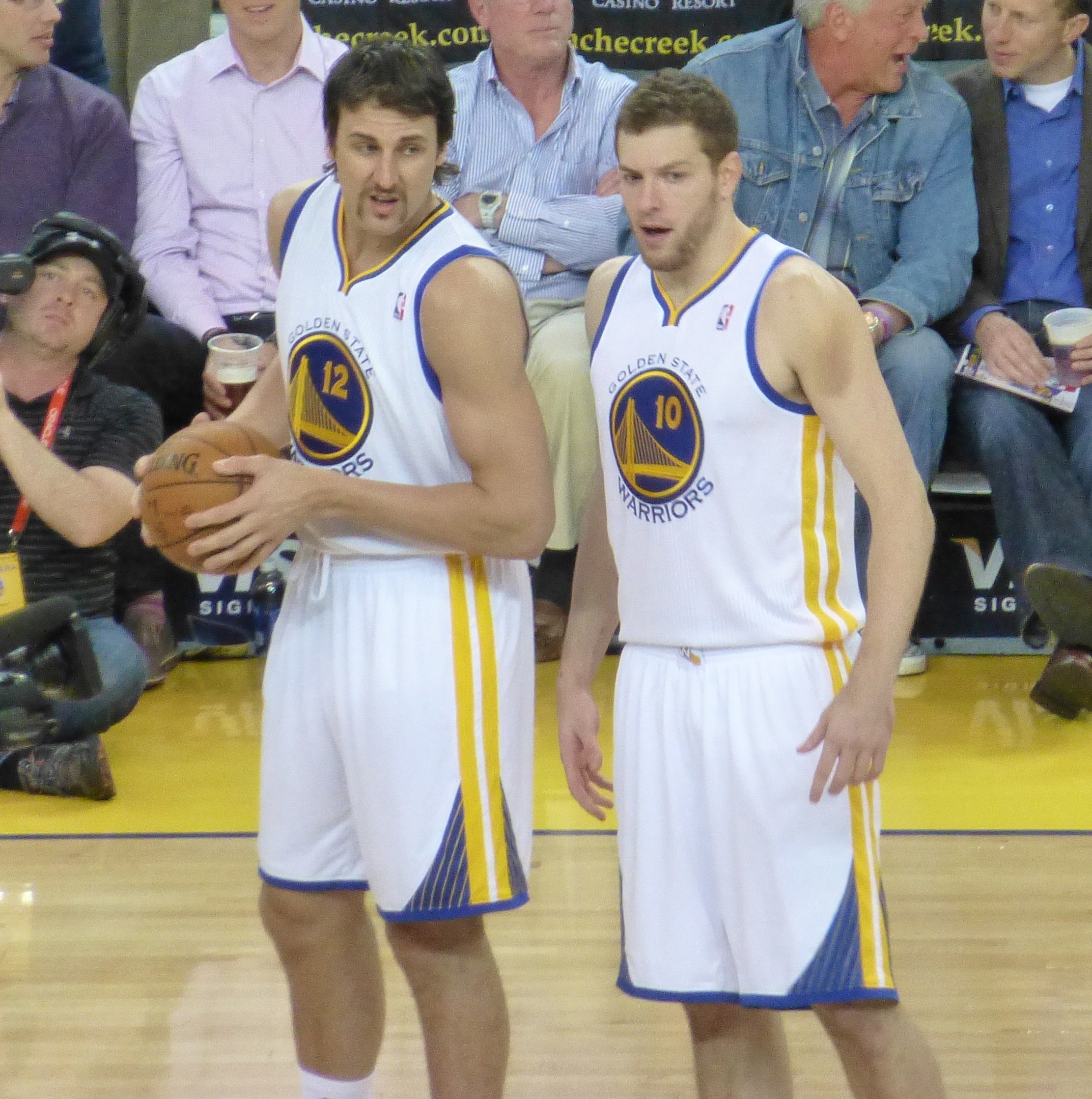
Bogut (left) with David Lee in 2013

On 13 March 2012, Bogut and Stephen Jackson were traded to the Golden State Warriors in exchange for Monta Ellis, Ekpe Udoh and Kwame Brown. According to the Warriors, he underwent surgery in April to "clean out loose particles and bone spurs in the ankle". Bogut sat out the 2012–13 preseason, but played in four of the first five regular season games, averaging just 6.0 points and 3.8 rebounds. He was then declared out indefinitely. Bogut received Regenokine treatment to aid his recovery in late November, and it was also revealed that his procedure in April was more serious microfracture surgery than previously thought. Bogut returned on 28 January 2013, recording 12 points, eight rebounds, two assists, and four blocks in a road victory over the Toronto Raptors. On 2 May, during Game 6 of the first round of the playoffs, Bogut recorded playoff career-highs of 14 points and 21 rebounds. He also became the first Warriors player with 20 playoff rebounds since Larry Smith had 23 on 12 May 1987 against the Los Angeles Lakers.

On 25 October 2013, Bogut signed a three-year, $36 million contract extension with the Warriors. Despite another injury-riddled season in 2013–14, he still finished 10th in NBA Defensive Player of the Year voting and became the first player in franchise history to average at least 10 rebounds per game while shooting 60 percent from the field.

After playing well through the first 19 games of the 2014–15 season, Bogut injured his right knee on 8 December 2014 against the Minnesota Timberwolves and subsequently missed 12 games. He returned to action off the bench against Indiana on 7 January 2015, recording four points and eight rebounds in a 117–102 victory. On 2 March, Bogut scored a season-high 16 points in a loss to the Brooklyn Nets. On 7 April, he had eight points and a career-high nine blocks in a loss to the New Orleans Pelicans. Bogut and the Warriors won the 2015 NBA Finals after defeating the Cleveland Cavaliers in six games despite a 2–1 deficit.

Disappointed in the way he ended the 2014–15 season, Bogut removed all processed sugars from his diet during the 2015 off-season and subsequently came into training camp in October 2015 with improved athleticism, having lost 22 pounds (10.0 kg). On 9 February 2016, Bogut had a season-best game with 13 points, 11 rebounds, three steals and a season-high six blocked shots in a 123–110 victory over the Houston Rockets. The Warriors broke the NBA record for most wins in a season with 73, eclipsing the 72 wins set by the 1995–96 Chicago Bulls. In Game 5 of the Western Conference Finals match-up with the Oklahoma City Thunder on 26 May, Bogut recorded a playoff career-high 15 points and 14 rebounds to help the Warriors send the series to a Game 6 with a 120–111 victory at home, cutting the Thunder's advantage in the series to 3–2. The Warriors went on to win the series in seven games and advanced to the NBA Finals for the second straight year, where they would again face the Cleveland Cavaliers. On 15 June, he was ruled out for six to eight weeks after suffering a left knee injury during Game 5 of the NBA Finals two days prior. The Warriors went on to lose the series in seven games despite a 3–1 lead.

=== Dallas Mavericks (2016–2017) ===
On 7 July 2016, Bogut was traded, along with a future second-round pick, to the Dallas Mavericks in exchange for a top-55 protected 2019 second-round pick that eventually wasn't converted. The trade was made by the Warriors to free up salary cap space for their signing of Kevin Durant.

Bogut made his Mavericks debut in the season opener on 26 October 2016, recording six points, six rebounds, three assists, and a block in a 130–121 overtime loss to the Indiana Pacers. On 3 December, he had a game-high 11 rebounds and a season-high eight points in a 107–82 victory over the Chicago Bulls. Bogut went on to miss 11 games in December with a right knee injury, and a further six games in January with a right hamstring strain.

On 23 February 2017, Bogut was traded, along with Justin Anderson and a protected first-round pick, to the Philadelphia 76ers in exchange for Nerlens Noel. Four days later, he was waived by the 76ers.

=== Cleveland Cavaliers (2017) ===
On 2 March 2017, Bogut signed with the Cleveland Cavaliers. Four days later, Bogut broke his left leg 56 seconds into his Cleveland debut. Initial X-rays revealed a fractured tibia, and he was subsequently taken to the Cleveland Clinic for further tests. There, Bogut's tibia was set, and he was scheduled to undergo a non-surgical treatment and recovery plan. Bogut was subsequently ruled out for the remainder of the regular season and playoffs. As a result, he was waived by the Cavaliers on 13 March.

=== Los Angeles Lakers (2017–2018) ===
On 19 September 2017, Bogut signed with the Los Angeles Lakers. He made his Lakers debut in the season opener on 19 October, committing three fouls and three turnovers in a 108–92 loss to the Los Angeles Clippers.

On 6 January 2018, Bogut was waived by the Lakers. He did not return to the NBA that season in order to remain in Australia with his pregnant wife.

=== Sydney Kings (2018–2019) ===
On 24 April 2018, Bogut signed a two-year deal with the Sydney Kings of the Australian National Basketball League. At the end of the 2018–19 regular season, he was named the NBL Most Valuable Player after averaging 11.6 points per game to go with 329 rebounds, 98 assists, and 77 blocks. Bogut was also named the Best Defensive Player and earned All-NBL First Team honours. He helped the Kings reach the playoffs with an 18–10 record and a third-place finish, before losing 2–0 to Melbourne United in the semi-finals. In 30 total games, Bogut averaged 11.4 points, a league-high 11.6 rebounds, 3.4 assists, and 2.7 blocks in 29.7 minutes per game.

=== Return to Golden State (2019) ===
On 6 March 2019, after the conclusion of the 2018–19 NBL season, Bogut signed with the Golden State Warriors for the rest of the 2018–19 NBA season. His deal with the Warriors was allowed by the Kings with the condition that he honoured the second year of his two-year contract. The Warriors reached the 2019 NBA Finals, where they lost in six games to the Toronto Raptors.

=== Return to Sydney (2019–2020) ===
Bogut rejoined the Sydney Kings for the 2019–20 NBL season and helped them win the minor premiership with a first-place finish and a 20–8 record. He was named to the All-NBL Second Team. On 25 May 2020, Bogut announced that he would not be re-signing with the Kings.

Bogut had two surgeries in 2020, one to remove a bone spur in his ankle and the other to help with sciatica in his lower back.

=== Retirement ===
On 1 December 2020, Bogut announced his retirement from basketball, citing numerous injury issues as the main reason.

== National team career ==
Bogut started for the Boomers at the 2004 Athens Olympics, averaging 13.7 points, 9.0 rebounds and 1.2 blocked shots and shooting 58.0% from the field. He represented Australia again in the 2006 FIBA World Championship. Australia advanced to the Round of 16 before losing to the United States. Bogut averaged 12.8 points per game and 6.2 rebounds per game during the tournament, leading Australia in both categories. He started for the Boomers at the 2008 Beijing Olympics. In 2012, Bogut was unable to play for the Boomers in the London Olympics, as he had previously broken his left ankle in January during the 2011–12 NBA season.

On 14 July 2015, Bogut was named in the Australian Boomers squad for their European tour and the 2015 FIBA Oceania Championship. The following year, he was a member of the Boomers team that finished in fourth place at the 2016 Olympic Games in Rio de Janeiro. This equaled Australia's best ever finish at the Olympics, with the Boomers having also finished fourth in 1988, 1996 and 2000. In 2019, the Boomers again finished fourth, this time at the FIBA Basketball World Cup in China.

In May 2025, Bogut was inducted into the FIBA Hall of Fame, becoming the ninth Australian to be honored.

== Coaching career ==
On 12 March 2025, Bogut was appointed as an assistant coach of the Sydney Kings for the 2025–26 NBL season.

== Political views ==
In November and December 2016, on Twitter, Bogut made a series of tweets in which he implied he believed elements of the Pizzagate hoax were real. At the time, the hoax had rapidly evolved into an elaborate conspiracy theory that ostensibly involved child sex trafficking, Hillary Clinton, political strategist John Podesta and other Democrats, and it was supposedly centred in the (actually nonexistent) basement of a Washington, D.C., pizza parlor.

In 2021, via his Instagram account, Bogut posted multiple times about coronavirus lockdowns. The lockdown, Victoria's sixth, prompted Bogut to vent his frustration due to Foodbank Victoria being closed because of concerns it was a coronavirus hotspot. He also believed that the lockdowns were already disproportionately affecting the working class. Bogut also claimed in his post that he had been approached to promote public health measures for money but declined, further stating without significant evidence that many other unnamed Australian celebrities were supposedly being compensated for urging that the public adhere to pandemic control measures despite many celebrities not being subject to the same rules as the working class. Bogut then urged other celebrities to speak out for residents, proclaiming "The silence was deafening".

In January 2022, Bogut claimed on his social media that the Victorian government was attempting to 'silence him' after receiving a letter from the Victorian Electoral Commission over social media posts he had posted supporting the passing of a bill aimed at diminishing the pandemic powers of the government. The electoral commission denied the claims, stating that the basis of the letter was over Bogut's failure to have his posts authorised.

On 15 December 2024, Bogut posted a photo on one of his social media accounts which shows him hugging controversial singer Marko Perković whose songs glorify Croatian nationalism and chauvinism and promote the World War II-era fascist Ustaše dictatorship.

== Personal life ==
Bogut and his wife, Jessica, have two sons, Luka and Nikola. Besides English, Bogut also speaks Croatian.

== Career statistics ==
Legend
| GP | Games played | GS | Games started | MPG | Minutes per game |
| FG% | Field goal percentage | 3P% | 3-point field goal percentage | FT% | Free throw percentage |
| RPG | Rebounds per game | APG | Assists per game | SPG | Steals per game |
| BPG | Blocks per game | PPG | Points per game | **Bold** | Career high |
| † | Won an NBA championship | * | Led the league |

=== NBA ===
==== Regular season ====
| Year | Team | GP | GS | MPG | FG% | 3P% | FT% | RPG | APG | SPG | BPG | PPG |
|---|---|---|---|---|---|---|---|---|---|---|---|---|
| 2005–06 | Milwaukee | **82*** | 77 | 28.6 | .533 | .000 | .629 | 7.0 | 2.3 | .6 | .8 | 9.4 |
| 2006–07 | Milwaukee | 66 | 66 | 34.2 | .553 | .200 | .577 | 8.8 | **3.0** | .7 | .5 | 12.3 |
| 2007–08 | Milwaukee | 78 | **78** | 34.9 | .511 | .000 | .587 | 9.8 | 2.6 | .8 | 1.7 | 14.3 |
| 2008–09 | Milwaukee | 36 | 33 | 31.2 | .577 | — | .571 | 10.3 | 2.0 | .6 | 1.0 | 11.7 |
| 2009–10 | Milwaukee | 69 | 69 | 32.3 | .520 | .000 | .629 | 10.2 | 1.8 | .6 | 2.5 | **15.9** |
| 2010–11 | Milwaukee | 65 | 65 | **35.3** | .495 | .000 | .442 | **11.1** | 2.0 | .7 | **2.6*** | 12.8 |
| 2011–12 | Milwaukee | 12 | 12 | 30.3 | .449 | .000 | .609 | 8.3 | 2.6 | **1.0** | 2.0 | 11.3 |
| 2012–13 | Golden State | 32 | 32 | 24.6 | .451 | **1.000** | .500 | 7.7 | 2.1 | .6 | 1.7 | 5.8 |
| 2013–14 | Golden State | 67 | 67 | 26.4 | .627 | — | .344 | 10.0 | 1.7 | .7 | 1.8 | 7.3 |
| 2014–15† | Golden State | 67 | 65 | 23.6 | .563 | — | .524 | 8.1 | 2.7 | .6 | 1.7 | 6.3 |
| 2015–16 | Golden State | 70 | 66 | 20.7 | .627 | **1.000** | .480 | 7.0 | 2.3 | .5 | 1.6 | 5.4 |
| 2016–17 | Dallas | 26 | 21 | 22.4 | .469 | .000 | .273 | 8.3 | 1.9 | .5 | 1.0 | 3.0 |
| 2016–17 | Cleveland | 1 | 0 | 1.0 | — | — | — | .0 | .0 | .0 | .0 | .0 |
| 2017–18 | L.A. Lakers | 24 | 5 | 9.0 | **.680** | — | **1.000** | 3.3 | .6 | .2 | .5 | 1.5 |
| 2018–19 | Golden State | 11 | 5 | 12.2 | .500 | — | **1.000** | 5.0 | 1.0 | .3 | .7 | 3.5 |
| Career | | 706 | 661 | 28.1 | .535 | .120 | .557 | 8.7 | 2.2 | .6 | 1.5 | 9.6 |

==== Playoffs ====
| Year | Team | GP | GS | MPG | FG% | 3P% | FT% | RPG | APG | SPG | BPG | PPG |
|---|---|---|---|---|---|---|---|---|---|---|---|---|
| 2006 | Milwaukee | 5 | 5 | **34.4** | .435 | — | .375 | 6.2 | **3.4** | **.6** | .0 | **8.6** |
| 2013 | Golden State | 12 | 12 | 27.3 | .582 | — | .348 | **10.9** | 1.8 | .5 | 1.5 | 7.2 |
| 2015† | Golden State | 19 | 18 | 23.2 | .560 | .000 | .385 | 8.1 | 1.9 | **.6** | **1.8** | 4.7 |
| 2016 | Golden State | **22** | **22** | 16.6 | .623 | .000 | .357 | 5.7 | 1.4 | **.6** | 1.6 | 4.6 |
| 2019 | Golden State | 19 | 6 | 9.4 | **.649** | — | **.800** | 3.9 | 1.1 | .3 | .3 | 2.7 |
| Career | | 77 | 63 | 19.3 | .573 | .000 | .397 | 6.7 | 1.6 | .5 | 1.2 | 4.8 |

=== College ===
| Year | Team | GP | GS | MPG | FG% | 3P% | FT% | RPG | APG | SPG | BPG | PPG |
|---|---|---|---|---|---|---|---|---|---|---|---|---|
| 2003–04 | Utah | 33 | 33 | 30.4 | .577 | **.364** | .640 | 9.9 | 2.2 | .4 | 1.3 | 12.5 |
| 2004–05 | Utah | **35** | **35** | **35.0** | **.620** | .360 | **.692** | **12.2** | **2.3** | **1.0** | **1.9** | **20.4** |
| Career | | 68 | 68 | 32.7 | .603 | .361 | .674 | 11.1 | 2.3 | .7 | 1.6 | 16.6 |

== See also ==
- List of NBA annual blocks leaders
