= Nerlens Noel =

American basketball player (born 1994)

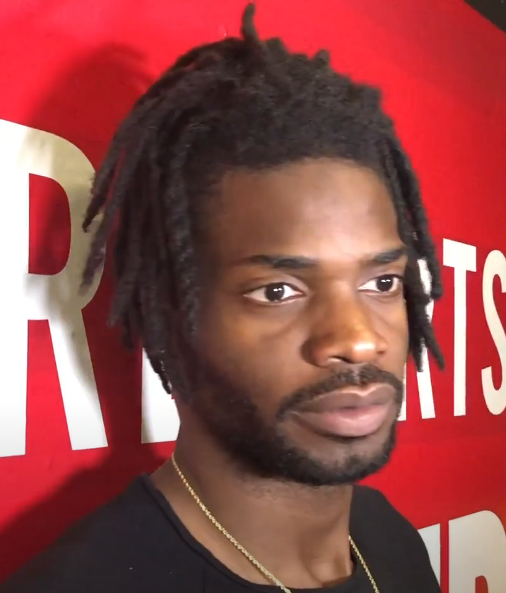
- Noel in 2018

Personal information
- Born: April 10, 1994 (age 32) Malden, Massachusetts, U.S.
- Listed height: 6 ft 10 in (2.08 m)
- Listed weight: 220 lb (100 kg)

Career information
- High school: Everett (Everett, Massachusetts); Tilton School (Tilton, New Hampshire)
- College: Kentucky (2012–2013)
- NBA draft: 2013: 1st round, 6th overall pick
- Drafted by: New Orleans Pelicans
- Playing career: 2013–2023
- Position: Center / power forward
- Number: 4, 3, 9, 0

Career history
- 2013–2017: Philadelphia 76ers
- 2017–2018: Dallas Mavericks
- 2018–2020: Oklahoma City Thunder
- 2020–2022: New York Knicks
- 2022–2023: Detroit Pistons
- 2023: Brooklyn Nets

Career highlights
- NBA All-Rookie First Team (2015); First-team All-SEC (2013); SEC Defensive Player of the Year (2013); SEC All-Defensive Team (2013); SEC Rookie of the Year (2013); SEC All-Freshman Team (2013); USA Today High School Player of the Year (2012); First-team Parade All-American (2012)
- Stats at NBA.com
- Stats at Basketball Reference

Nerlens Noel (born April 10, 1994) is an American former professional basketball player. His collegiate basketball career ended in his first season with a tear of his anterior cruciate ligament (ACL) at the University of Kentucky. Noel was drafted with the sixth overall pick in the 2013 NBA draft by the New Orleans Pelicans. His rights were later traded to the Philadelphia 76ers. He played center and power forward, and was one of the top high school basketball players in the class of 2012.

== High school career ==
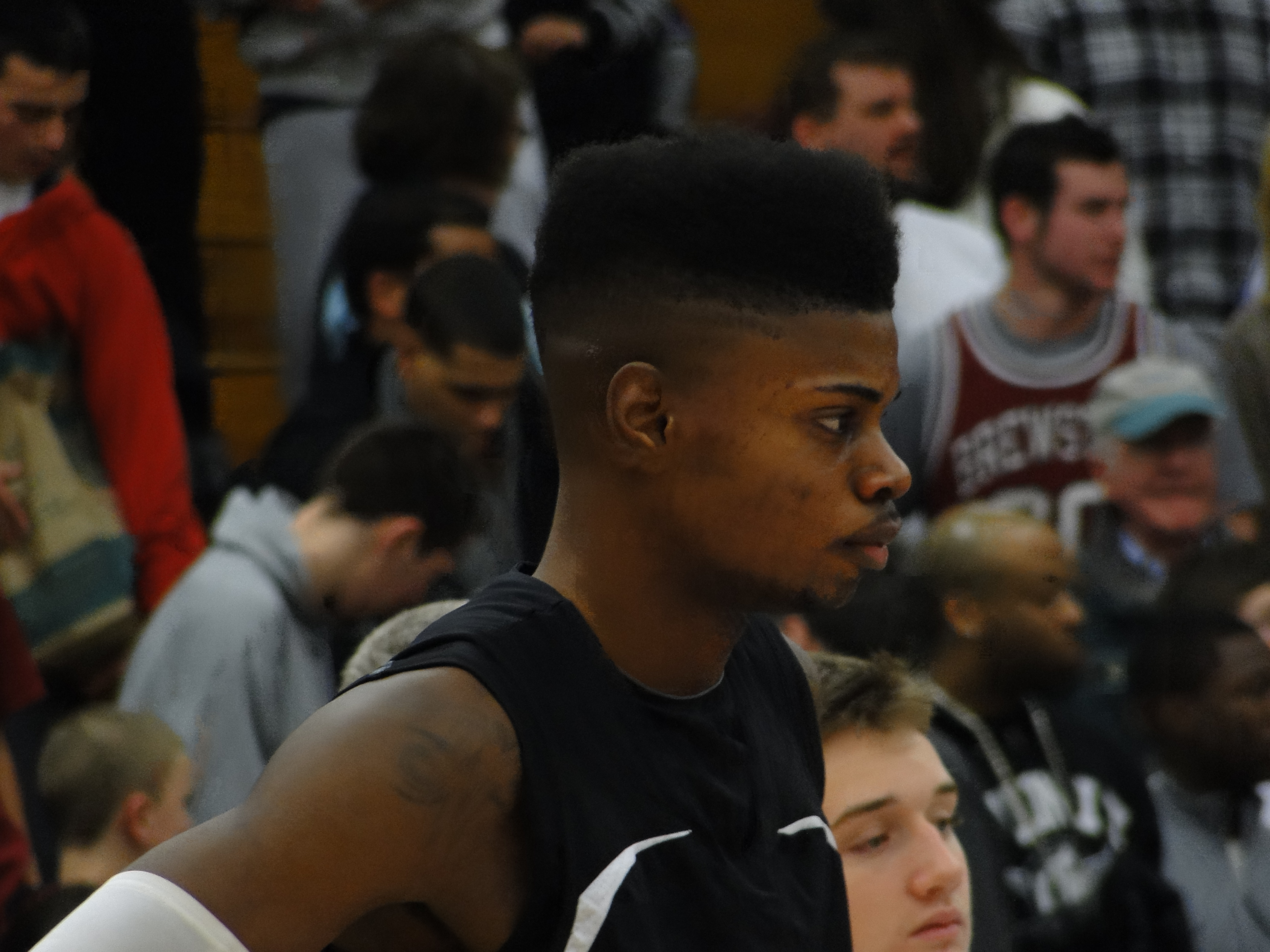
Noel at the Hoop Hall Classic in 2011

Born outside Boston in Malden, Massachusetts to Haitian immigrant parents, Noel spent his first two years of high school at Everett High School. After his sophomore year, he transferred to Tilton School in Tilton, New Hampshire. Noel repeated his sophomore year at Tilton, reclassifying to the class of 2013, but later reclassified back to the 2012 college recruiting class. Noel averaged 12.6 points, 7.2 rebounds and 3.9 blocks per game as a senior.

He was rated as the No. 1 player in the class of 2012 by ESPN and Scout.com, and No. 2 by SLAM. Noel was selected to play in the 2012 Nike Hoop Summit and the 2012 Jordan Brand Classic. In addition to his high school career, Noel also played AAU basketball on the same team as future Sixers teammate Michael Carter-Williams. Shortly before his high school graduation, an article in The New York Times described Noel as being hailed as one of the best shot blockers of his generation, although he was also described as having unrefined offensive skills.

College recruiting
Name	Hometown	School	Height	Weight	Commit date
Nerlens Noel; C	Everett, Massachusetts	The Tilton School	6 ft 10 in (2.08 m)	215 lb (98 kg)	Apr 11, 2012
Nerlens Noel; C	Recruit ratings: Scout: Rivals: 247Sports: (98)				
Overall recruit ranking: Scout: 1 Rivals: 2, 1 (C) ESPN: 1
Note: In many cases, Scout, Rivals, 247Sports, On3, and ESPN may conflict in their listings of height and weight.; In these cases, the average was taken. ESPN grades are on a 100-point scale.; Sources: "Kentucky 2012 Basketball Commitments". Rivals.; "2012 Kentucky Basketball Commits". Scout.; "ESPN". ESPN.; "Scout.com Team Recruiting Rankings". Scout.; "2012 Team Ranking". Rivals.

== College career ==
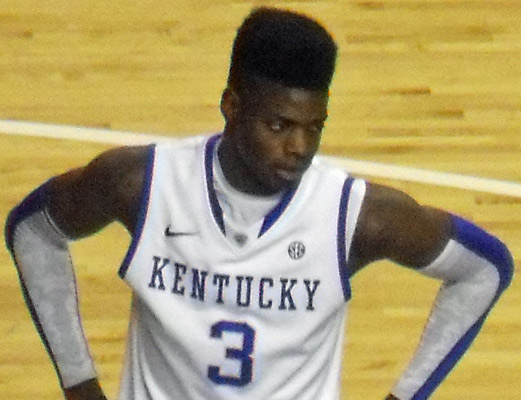
Noel in a Kentucky Wildcats game in 2012

After deliberating among several elite college basketball programs, Noel decided in April 2012 that he would be going to the University of Kentucky to play NCAA Division I basketball. He made his verbal commitment by revealing the UK logo shaved in the back of his head on national television. Since Noel was well known for his elite shot blocking abilities, fans and the media had high expectations for him to fill the shoes of Anthony Davis, who had just led the Kentucky Wildcats to a national championship in the previous season, was the 2011–2012 National Player of the Year in the NCAA, and set a Kentucky and NCAA freshman single-season block record with 186.

In his third game on November 16, 2012, he accumulated 15 points, 7 rebounds, 4 assists, 1 block, and 4 steals against Lafayette. On January 12, 2013, although Kentucky lost the game against Texas A&M, Noel recorded 15 points, 11 rebounds, 7 blocks, 6 assists, and 4 steals.

On January 29, 2013, Noel set the UK single-game record with 12 blocks in an 87–74 team victory over No. 16 Ole Miss. Five of the blocks happened while Noel had four personal fouls, and two of them were denials on slam dunk attempts. The UK school record was previously nine blocks, set by Sam Bowie in 1981 and was then tied by Andre Riddick in 1993. Although he recorded only two points, Ole Miss coach Andy Kennedy said in the post-game press conference that "[Noel] was the difference in the game" and that he is "an incredible defensive presence." Ole Miss senior forward Murphy Holloway added that he believes Nerlens Noel is the "best shot blocker [he has] played against", including Anthony Davis.

On February 12, 2013, in a game against the Florida Gators, Noel tore the ACL in his left knee after blocking a Florida lay-up, forcing him to sit out the remainder of the season. Before his injury, it was projected that he would be the 1st overall pick in the 2013 NBA draft. Despite his injury, Noel decided to declare for the 2013 draft on April 15, 2013.

Noel was honored with many awards, including SEC Freshman of the Year, SEC Defensive Player of the Year, SEC First Team, SEC All Freshman Team, and SEC Community Service Team. In addition to earning All-SEC first team honors by the league's coaches, Noel earned first-team honors from the Associated Press, continuing a four-year streak of UK players earning first-team AP honors.

The Wildcats' 6 ft 11 in (2.11 m) center was joined by UNLV Runnin' Rebels' Anthony Bennett, UCLA Bruins's Shabazz Muhammad, Oklahoma State Cowboys's Marcus Smart and Kansas Jayhawks's Ben McLemore on the Freshman All-America team. He was the fifth Kentucky player under coach John Calipari to earn the honor from the USBWA, joining John Wall, DeMarcus Cousins, Anthony Davis, and Michael Kidd-Gilchrist.

== Professional career ==
=== Philadelphia 76ers (2013–2017) ===
Noel entered the 2013 NBA draft after playing one season at the University of Kentucky and was projected to be one of the top picks, with many considering Noel the favorite to be picked first in the draft. He was invited to sit in the "green room", a room of the projected top 10 to 15 collegiate basketball players during the draft and ended up being selected with the sixth overall pick by the New Orleans Pelicans. There were concerns around the league about his torn left ACL, which may have caused him to slide down the draft. Later that night, Noel's draft rights were traded along with a 2014 first-round pick to the Philadelphia 76ers in exchange for guard Jrue Holiday and the draft rights to Pierre Jackson. On July 12, 2013, the trade sending Noel to the 76ers was finalized. On September 24, 2013, he signed with the 76ers. Although the 76ers' original plan was to have Noel play during the 2013–14 season, Noel missed the entire season as he recovered from knee surgery.

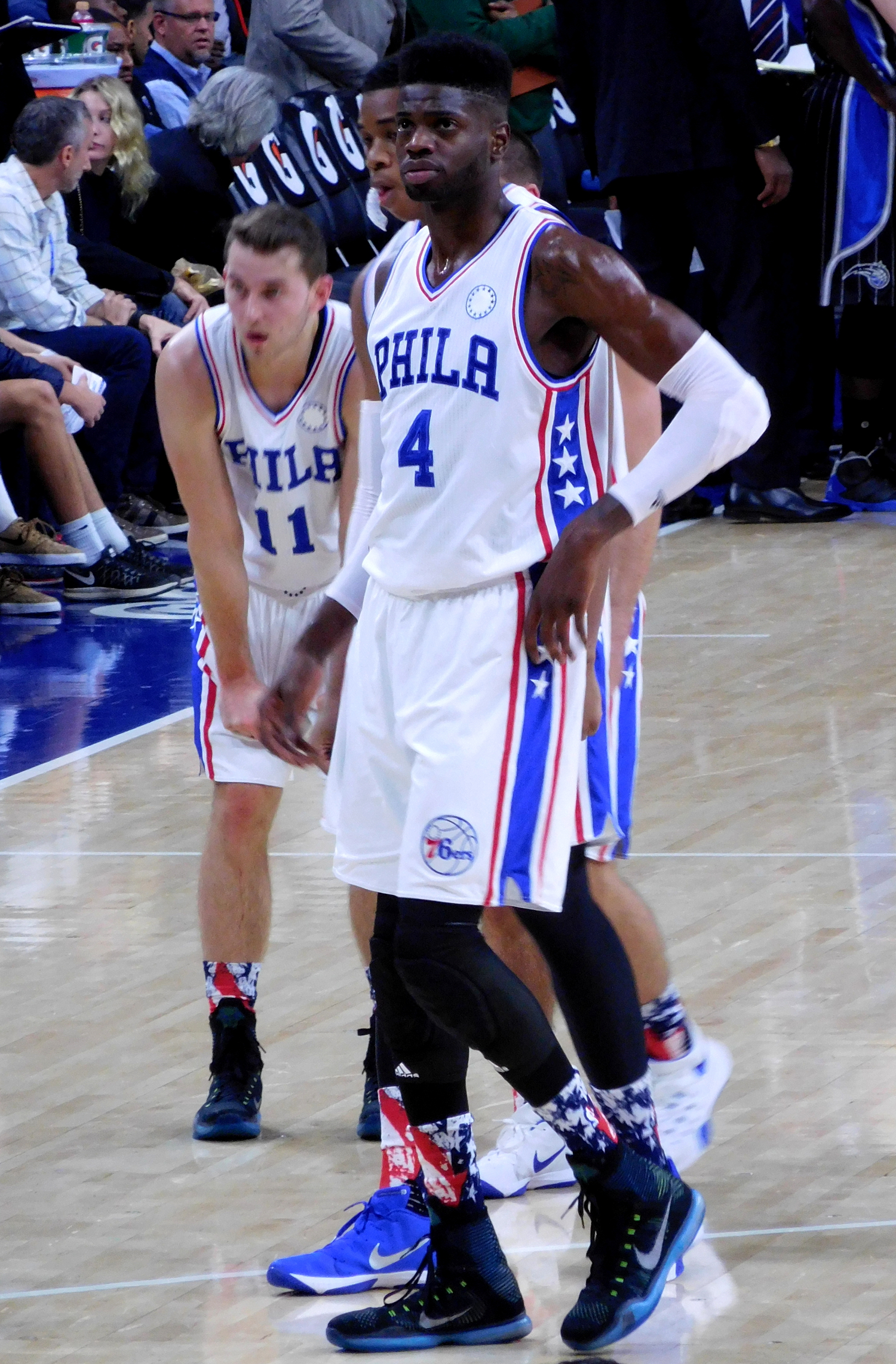
Noel as a 76er in 2015

Noel joined the Philadelphia 76ers for the 2014 NBA Summer League. On October 29, 2014, Noel made his NBA debut in the 76ers' 103–91 loss to the Indiana Pacers. In just under 35 minutes of action as a starter, he recorded six points, along with 10 rebounds and three blocks. Two days later, the 76ers exercised their third-year team option on Noel's rookie scale contract, extending the contract through the 2015–16 season. On January 30, he recorded 14 points, 6 rebounds, 4 steals, and a then-career-high 6 blocks in a 103–94 win over the Minnesota Timberwolves.

Noel participated in the 2015 Rising Stars Challenge as part of the Team USA roster. On February 20, Noel recorded 12 points, 9 rebounds, 4 steals, and a career-high 9 blocks in a loss to the Indiana Pacers. A week later against Washington, Noel became just the third 76ers' rookie to record 100 blocks in a season.

On October 30, 2015, the 76ers exercised their fourth-year team option on Noel's rookie scale contract, extending the contract through the 2016–17 season. On December 30, he recorded a season-high 20 points and 9 rebounds in a 110–105 win over the Sacramento Kings. On February 11, he was ruled out of the 2016 Rising Stars Challenge due to tendinitis in his right knee.

On October 22, 2016, Noel was ruled out for three to five weeks due to an inflamed plica above his left knee that required surgery. After spending time with the Delaware 87ers of the NBA Development League on injury rehab assignments in late November and early December, Noel made his season debut for the 76ers on December 11 against the Detroit Pistons, having missed the first 23 games. He scored eight points in 10 minutes off the bench before leaving the game in the second quarter with a left ankle sprain.

On January 24, 2017, while making his first start of the season in place of the injured Joel Embiid, Noel scored a season-high 19 points, along with three blocks, in a 121–110 win over the Los Angeles Clippers.

=== Dallas Mavericks (2017–2018) ===
On February 23, 2017, Noel was traded to the Dallas Mavericks in exchange for Justin Anderson, Andrew Bogut and a 2017 protected first-round pick. He made his debut for the Mavericks two days later, recording nine points and 10 rebounds off the bench in a 96–83 win over the New Orleans Pelicans. On March 3, in his first start for the Mavericks, Noel tied a career high with 17 rebounds while scoring 15 points in a 104–100 win over the Memphis Grizzlies.

In 2017, Nerlens Noel refused $70 million for a 4-year contract. On June 23, 2017, the Mavericks tendered a $4.1 million qualifying offer to make Noel a restricted free agent. On August 26, he accepted the one-year, $4.1 million qualifying offer, officially re-signing with the Mavericks two days later. In the Mavericks' season opener on October 18, Noel had 16 points, his most since joining Dallas, and 11 rebounds in a 117–111 loss to the Atlanta Hawks. On December 8, he underwent surgery to repair a torn ligament in his left thumb. He subsequently missed 42 games, returning to action on February 28, 2018, against the Oklahoma City Thunder, recording four points, three rebounds and four fouls in 16 minutes in a 111–110 overtime loss. On March 6, Noel had a season-high 14 rebounds in a 118–107 win over the Denver Nuggets. On April 3, he was suspended without pay for five games for violating the terms of the NBA/NBPA Anti-Drug Program.

=== Oklahoma City Thunder (2018–2020) ===
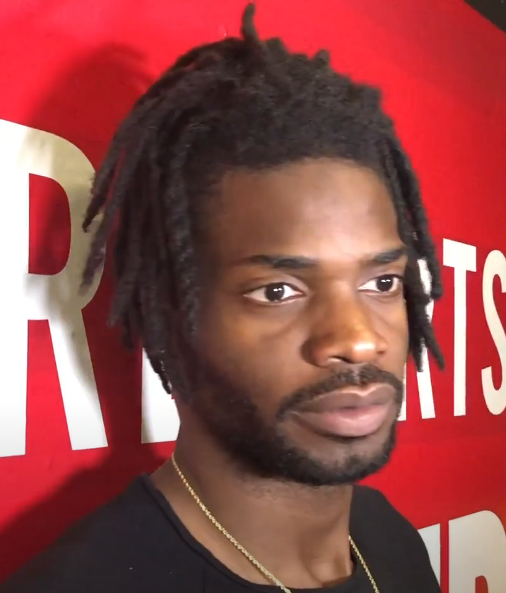
Noel at the 2018 NBA Summer League.

On July 6, 2018, Noel signed a two-year contract with the Oklahoma City Thunder. On October 28, he had 20 points and 15 rebounds in a 117–110 win over the Phoenix Suns. On December 31, he scored 15 points in 15 minutes in a 122–102 win over the Dallas Mavericks. On January 8, 2019, against the Minnesota Timberwolves, Noel was taken off the court on a stretcher in the third quarter after taking an elbow in the face and hitting the floor hard while contesting a dunk by Andrew Wiggins. Due to concussion, he missed the next three games.

=== New York Knicks (2020–2022) ===
On November 25, 2020, Noel signed a one-year contract with the New York Knicks. He made his Knicks debut on December 23, recording two points and three rebounds in a 121–107 loss to the Indiana Pacers. On January 15, 2021, Noel recorded a season-high six blocks, alongside four points and four rebounds, in a 106–103 loss to the Cleveland Cavaliers. On March 21, he scored a season-high 13 points, alongside ten rebounds and two steals, in a 101–100 overtime loss to the Philadelphia 76ers. On May 5, Noel recorded six blocks, alongside five points, five rebounds and two steals, in a 113–97 loss to the Denver Nuggets. After finishing with a 41–31 record, the Knicks qualified for the playoffs for the first time since 2013 and faced the Atlanta Hawks during their first round series. On May 28, Noel recorded 12 points, eight rebounds and three steals in a 105–94 Game 3 loss. The Knicks ended up losing the series in five games.

On August 11, 2021, the Knicks re-signed Noel to a three-year, $32 million deal. On November 5, he grabbed a season-high 13 rebounds, alongside six points and four steals, in a 113–98 win over the Milwaukee Bucks. On January 24, 2022, Noel grabbed 13 rebounds, alongside two points and two steals, in a 95–93 loss to the Cleveland Cavaliers. He played his last game of the season on February 7, and he did not appear for the Knicks again during the 2021–22 season due to plantar fasciitis.

=== Detroit Pistons (2022–2023) ===
On July 11, 2022, Noel was traded, alongside Alec Burks, to the Detroit Pistons in exchange for the draft rights to Nikola Radičević and a 2025 protected second-round pick. Noel made his Pistons debut on October 31, recording two points, four rebounds and two assists in a 110–108 loss to the Milwaukee Bucks. On February 28, 2023, he reached a contract buyout agreement with the Pistons and was subsequently waived.

=== Brooklyn Nets (2023) ===
On March 6, 2023, Noel signed a 10-day contract with the Brooklyn Nets. He made three appearances (one start) for Brooklyn, averaging 1.0 point, 3.0 rebounds, and 1.0 assist.

On July 21, 2023, Noel signed with the Sacramento Kings, but was waived on September 12.

== Career statistics ==
Legend
GP	Games played	GS	Games started	MPG	Minutes per game
FG%	Field goal percentage	3P%	3-point field goal percentage	FT%	Free throw percentage
RPG	Rebounds per game	APG	Assists per game	SPG	Steals per game
BPG	Blocks per game	PPG	Points per game	**Bold**	Career high

=== NBA ===
==== Regular season ====
Year	Team	GP	GS	MPG	FG%	3P%	FT%	RPG	APG	SPG	BPG	PPG
2014–15	Philadelphia	75	**71**	**30.8**	.462	—	.609	**8.1**	1.7	**1.8**	1.9	9.9
2015–16	Philadelphia	67	62	29.3	.521	**.500**	.590	**8.1**	**1.8**	**1.8**	1.5	**11.1**
2016–17	Philadelphia	29	7	19.4	.611	.000	.683	5.0	1.0	1.4	.9	8.9
2016–17	Dallas	22	12	22.0	.575	—	.708	6.8	.9	1.0	1.1	8.5
2017–18	Dallas	30	6	15.7	.524	.000	.750	5.6	.7	1.0	.7	4.4
2018–19	Oklahoma City	**77**	2	13.7	.587	—	.684	4.2	.6	.9	1.2	4.9
2019–20	Oklahoma City	61	7	18.5	**.684**	.333	**.755**	4.9	.9	1.0	1.5	7.4
2020–21	New York	64	41	24.2	.614	.000	.714	6.4	.7	1.1	**2.2**	5.1
2021–22	New York	25	11	22.5	.533	.000	.700	5.6	.9	1.2	1.2	3.4
2022–23	Detroit	14	3	10.9	.400	**.500**	.700	2.6	.5	.9	.6	2.3
2022–23	Brooklyn	3	1	14.3	.167	—	.500	3.0	1.0	1.0	.3	1.0
Career		467	223	22.0	.546	.200	.655	6.1	1.1	1.3	1.5	7.1

==== Playoffs ====
Year	Team	GP	GS	MPG	FG%	3P%	FT%	RPG	APG	SPG	BPG	PPG
2019	Oklahoma City	5	0	12.0	**.600**	—	.000	3.8	.0	.4	.6	**4.8**
2020	Oklahoma City	**7**	0	13.9	.471	.000	.500	**4.1**	**.4**	.3	**.7**	3.0
2021	New York	5	**2**	**18.4**	.500	—	**.813**	4.0	.2	**.8**	.6	4.6
Career		17	2	14.6	.532	.000	.643	4.0	.2	.5	.6	4.0

=== College ===
Year	Team	GP	GS	MPG	FG%	3P%	FT%	RPG	APG	SPG	BPG	PPG
2012–13	Kentucky	24	24	31.9	.590	—	.529	9.5	1.6	2.1	4.4	10.5

== Personal life ==
Noel's parents migrated from Haiti in 1990. He has two older brothers and one younger sister; both of Noel's older brothers played for Division I college football programs. His oldest brother, Jim, played for Boston College, while his other brother, Rodman played for North Carolina State.
