= Jonathan Gibson (basketball) =

American basketball player (born 1987)

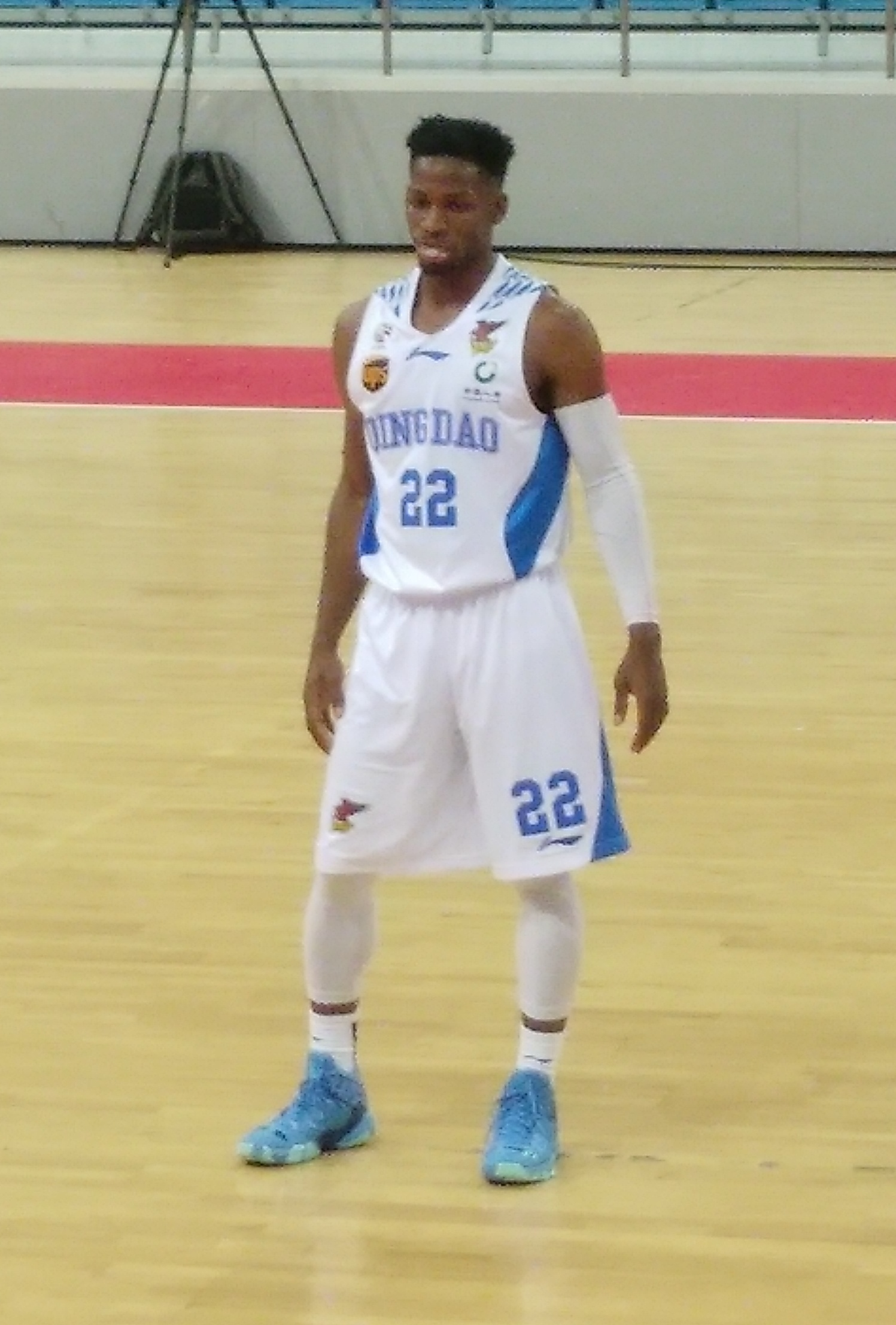
- Gibson with Qingdao in 2017

No. 22 – Al-Ula
- Position: Point guard
- League: Saudi Basketball League

Personal information
- Born: November 8, 1987 (age 38) West Covina, California, U.S.
- Listed height: 6 ft 2 in (1.88 m)
- Listed weight: 185 lb (84 kg)

Career information
- High school: Calvary Christian Prep (San Fernando, California)
- College: New Mexico State (2006–2010)
- NBA draft: 2010: undrafted
- Playing career: 2010–present

Career history
- 2010: Oyak Renault
- 2011: Ironi Ashkelon
- 2011–2012: Trabzonspor
- 2012–2013: Enel Brindisi
- 2013–2014: Zhejiang Lions
- 2014: Petrochimi Imam
- 2015–2016: Qingdao DoubleStar Eagles
- 2016: Dallas Mavericks
- 2017: Anhui Dragons
- 2017–2019: Qingdao DoubleStar Eagles
- 2018: Boston Celtics
- 2019–2020: Jiangsu Dragons
- 2020–2023: Beijing Ducks
- 2024: Sagesse Club
- 2024–present: Al-Ula

Career highlights
- Iranian Super League champion (2014); Iranian Super League Finals MVP (2014); All-Iranian SuperLeague Guard of the Year (2014); 2× CBA scoring champion (2014, 2016); Lega Basket Serie A All-Star (2013); Legadue Playoff champion (2012); Turkish League scoring champion (2012); Turkish League All-Star (2012); Turkish League Three-Point Shootout champion (2012); Second-team All-WAC (2010); WCBL All-Rookie First Team (2009)
- Stats at NBA.com
- Stats at Basketball Reference

Jonathan Mychal Gibson (born November 8, 1987) is an American professional basketball player for the Al-Ula of the Saudi Basketball League. He played college basketball for New Mexico State before playing professionally in Turkey, Israel, Italy, China and Iran. He made a name for himself in China, earning the league's scoring title in both the 2013–14 and the 2015–16 season, with 32.5 and 42 points per game respectively.

== High school career ==
Gibson attended Calvary Christian Prep School in San Fernando, California. As a senior in 2005–06, he averaged 23.3 points, 5.2 rebounds, 7.1 assists and 3.1 steals per game, as he led Calvary Christian to a 22–3 record and was named the most valuable player of the San Antonio League and a first team all-conference selection.

On May 2, 2006, Gibson signed a National Letter of Intent to play college basketball for New Mexico State University.

== College career ==
As a freshman at New Mexico State in 2006–07, Gibson averaged 2.6 points in 31 games, and finished with 22 assists. He twice had a 12-point performance during the season. In the WAC Tournament title game against Utah State on March 10, 2007, Gibson scored two late points on a reverse lay-up to help NMSU secure their first WAC title. In his first NCAA Tournament appearance, Gibson scored two points on 2-for-2 shooting from the free-throw line in nine minutes.

As a sophomore in 2007–08, Gibson appeared in all 35 games, earning 32 starting assignments, and averaged 12.2 points per game, which was second on the team. Gibson was a scoring threat as he shot 45.4% from the field, 41.9% from three-point range, and 75.6% from the free-throw line. He scored in double-figures in 24 games and reached the 20-point or more plateau on five occasions. He also had 55 assists and 33 steals. On February 9, 2008, he scored a career-high 24 points against Boise State. The Aggies ended the season winning 10 of the final 12 games and Gibson was in double-figures in nine of those contests. In the triple overtime thriller against Boise State on March 15 in the WAC title game, Gibson played a career-high 51 minutes and contributed 15 points.

As a junior in 2008–09, Gibson averaged 14.1 points per game, which ranked second on the team and 10th in the WAC. As a 30-game starter, Gibson surpassed the 20-point plateau five times. He posted a .426 field goal percentage and a .387 three-point field goal percentage, and ranked third on the squad in assists with 65 and tied for first on the squad with 44 steals. He led the Aggies in scoring in three games with a season-best 22 points against New Mexico on December 30, 2008, and in both games of the WAC Tournament, with 22 points against Boise State on March 12 and 16 against Utah State on March 13.

As a senior in 2009–10, Gibson averaged 17.5 points, 2.9 rebounds, 2.8 assists and 1.4 steals in 34 games while shooting 44.7% (197–441 FGs) from the field, 40.6% (106–261 3FGs) from three-point range and 84.8% (95–112 FTs) from the free throw line. He was named All-WAC Second Team and led the WAC in three-pointers made, ranked second in 3FG%, fifth in scoring average, fourth in FT%, eighth in FG% and seventh in steals per game. Gibson finished with 1,541 career points at NMSU, which is seventh in program history, and was part of two Western Athletic Conference Tournament championship teams in 2007 and 2010.

=== College statistics ===
Year	Team	GP	GS	MPG	FG%	3P%	FT%	RPG	APG	SPG	BPG	PPG
2006–07	New Mexico State	31	2	7.3	.338	.286	.677	.6	.7	.3	.0	2.6
2007–08	New Mexico State	35	32	27.0	.454	.419	.756	2.2	1.6	.9	.1	12.2
2008–09	New Mexico State	31	30	30.1	.426	.387	.668	1.9	2.1	1.4	.0	14.1
2009–10	New Mexico State	34	32	32.6	.447	.406	.848	2.9	2.8	1.4	.1	17.5
Career		131	96	24.5	.436	.398	.758	1.9	1.8	1.0	.0	11.8

== Professional career ==
=== 2010–11 season ===
On July 21, 2010, Gibson signed a one-year deal with Oyak Renault of the Turkish Basketball Super League. On December 27, 2010, he parted ways with Oyak. In 11 games for the club, he averaged 18.1 points, 3.9 rebounds, 3.3 assists and 2.0 steals per game. On January 12, 2011, he signed with Ironi Ashkelon of the Israeli Basketball Premier League for the rest of the season. In 16 games for Ironi, he averaged 7.3 points, 1.1 rebounds and 1.3 assists per game.

=== 2011–12 season ===
On September 28, 2011, Gibson signed a one-year deal with Trabzonspor of the Turkish Basketball Super League. Despite a poor season for Trabzonspor, a campaign that saw them go 6–24, Gibson averaged a league-best 19.9 points per game. He left the team prior to their season finale, and in 29 games, he also averaged 2.5 rebounds and 3.7 assists per game.

On April 24, 2012, Gibson signed with Enel Brindisi of the Legadue for the rest of the season. He made his debut for Brindisi on May 5, in the team's regular season finale. They finished the regular season in third place on the ladder with an 18–10 record. Brindisi breezed through the quarter-finals and semi-finals, winning both series 3–0. In the Finals, they defeated Giorgo Tesi PT 3–1 to win the league's playoff championship. Gibson dominated throughout the playoffs, and over 11 games for Brindisi (10 playoff, one regular season), he averaged 24.1 points, 3.5 rebounds, 3.4 assists and 1.5 steals per game. Winning the Legadue playoffs led to Brindisi being promoted to the Lega Basket Serie A for the 2012–13 season.

=== 2012–13 season ===
In July 2012, Gibson joined the Boston Celtics for the 2012 NBA Summer League. The Celtics went 4–1 at the Orlando Summer League and 2–3 at the Las Vegas Summer League. In 10 games for the Celtics, Gibson averaged 7.0 points, 1.3 rebounds and 1.6 assists in 12.8 minutes per game.

On July 7, 2012, Gibson re-signed with Enel Brindisi on a one-year deal. Brindisi finished the 2012–13 season in 12th place on the ladder with an 11–19 record, missing the playoffs in their first season back in the top league. Gibson appeared in all 30 games during the season, averaging 18.4 points (second in the league), 2.7 rebounds, 2.0 assists and 1.4 steals per game.

=== 2013–14 season ===
In August 2013, Gibson signed a one-year deal with the Zhejiang Lions of the Chinese Basketball Association. Gibson had a monster year with Zhejiang, appearing in 33 of 34 regular season games, missing only a January 10 game against the Beijing Ducks. During the regular season, he scored 40 points or more four times, including a 46-point effort on January 8 against Tianjin. Zhejiang finished the regular season in fifth place on the ladder with a 21–13 record. Gibson won the league's scoring title with a 31.7-points-per-game average. In Game 1 of their quarter-final match-up with Beijing, Gibson scored 54 points to help Zhejiang win the game 113–110. However, the Lions went on to lose the next three games to bow out of the playoffs with a 3–1 defeat. Gibson averaged 39 points per game over the four quarter-final games.

Following the conclusion of the 2013–14 CBA season, Gibson was offered a guaranteed deal by Russian club Nizhny Novgorod, but he turned it down. He later signed a one-month deal with Iranian club Petrochimi Imam on April 1, 2014. He made his debut for Petrochimi on April 20 in Game 1 of the team's semi-final series against Zob Ahan. Petrochimi went on to sweep the series in three games to move onto the Finals. There they defeated Mahram Tehran 4–1 to win their second straight title. Gibson scored 41 points in a Game 5 victory. In eight games for Petrochimi, Gibson averaged 30.9 points, 4.5 rebounds, 2.6 assists and 1.8 steals per game.

=== 2014–15 season ===
In July 2014, Gibson joined the Portland Trail Blazers for the 2014 NBA Summer League, but he managed just one game and played a total of six minutes.

Following his time with the Trail Blazers, Gibson signed a two-year deal with the Zhejiang Lions, returning to the club for a second stint. However, in early October, he suffered a foot injury and was ruled out for four to six weeks. On January 7, 2015, he was ruled out for the entire 2014–15 CBA season in order to rehab his broken foot.

On March 17, 2015, Gibson signed with Petrochimi Imam for the 2015 WABA Champions Cup, but the competition never went ahead.

=== 2015–16 season ===
In July 2015, Gibson parted ways with Zhejiang after terminating his contract with the team. On August 30, 2015, he signed a one-year deal with fellow Chinese team Qingdao DoubleStar. Gibson bested his 2013–14 CBA campaign by scoring 40 points or more in 24 games, including 50 points or more in four games. On December 13, 2015, he scored a career-high 56 points in a 138–124 win over Jiangsu Tongxi. Despite his dominant individual season, Qingdao missed the playoffs with a 16–22 record. He averaged 42.0 points per game on the season, thus winning the CBA scoring title for the second time in three years. He appeared in 36 of the team's 38 games in 2015–16, and also averaged 6.7 rebounds, 5.1 assists and 2.1 steals per game.

=== 2016–17 season ===
In July 2016, Gibson joined the Dallas Mavericks for the 2016 Las Vegas Summer League. At 28 years old, he was one of the oldest players in Vegas. He quickly became a Summer League sensation after scoring 30 points in his debut on July 9 against the Miami Heat. Three days later, he had a 26-point outing against the Boston Celtics. His impressive Summer League display led to a contract offer from Mavericks, and on July 15, Gibson signed a partially guaranteed three-year deal with the team. He was waived by the Mavericks on October 22 after appearing in seven preseason games. He later re-signed with the team on November 18 and made his NBA debut that night. With the Mavericks missing their top three options at point guard—Deron Williams, J. J. Barea and Devin Harris—all due to injury, Gibson backed-up Seth Curry off the bench and had 11 points and a team-high three assists in an 80–64 loss to the Memphis Grizzlies. The following night, he scored a game-high 26 points off the bench in a 95–87 loss to the Orlando Magic. He became the first undrafted player to score 26 points in his first or second game since Lloyd Daniels in 1992. He appeared in 11 straight games for the Mavericks while averaging 9.2 points in 18.6 minutes per game, before dropping out of the rotation and appearing in six of the next eight with just 4.5 minutes per game and registering four scoreless games. As a result, on December 27, he was waived by the Mavericks.

On May 8, 2017, Gibson signed with Anhui Dragons of China for the 2017 NBL season. In 13 games, he averaged 42.1 points, 5.2 rebounds, 5.5 assists and 2.2 steals per game.

=== 2017–18 season ===
On September 20, 2017, Gibson signed with the Qingdao DoubleStar Eagles of the Chinese Basketball Association, returning to the team for a second stint. In 38 games, he averaged 33.7 points, 6.8 rebounds, 4.7 assists and 1.5 steals per game.

On March 1, 2018, Gibson was acquired by the Erie BayHawks of the NBA G League. After failing to report to the team within 48 hours, Gibson was suspended by the G League on March 11. Gibson's preferred destination was reportedly the Texas Legends.

On April 6, 2018, Gibson signed with the Boston Celtics. He made his debut for the Celtics that night, scoring nine points in a 111–104 win over the Chicago Bulls. In the Celtics' regular season finale on April 11, Gibson scored 18 points in a 110–97 win over the Brooklyn Nets.

=== 2018–19 season ===
On September 11, 2018, Gibson signed with the Qingdao DoubleStar Eagles of the Chinese Basketball Association, returning to the team for a third stint.

On April 9, 2019, Gibson signed with the Boston Celtics, returning to the franchise for a second stint. However, he did not appear in a game for the Celtics during this stint.

=== 2019–20 season ===
On November 13, 2019, Gibson was reported to have signed with the Jiangsu Dragons of the Chinese Basketball Association. Gibson made his debut for the Dragons on November 21, 2019, with 31 points notched in a 130–114 win over the Qingdao Eagles.

=== 2020–21 season ===
Gibson signed with the Beijing Ducks on September 30, 2020.

=== 2023–24 season ===
Gibson signed with Sagesse Club in January 2024.

== NBA career statistics ==
Legend
GP	Games played	GS	Games started	MPG	Minutes per game
FG%	Field goal percentage	3P%	3-point field goal percentage	FT%	Free throw percentage
RPG	Rebounds per game	APG	Assists per game	SPG	Steals per game
BPG	Blocks per game	PPG	Points per game	**Bold**	Career high

=== Regular season ===
Year	Team	GP	GS	MPG	FG%	3P%	FT%	RPG	APG	SPG	BPG	PPG
2016–17	Dallas	**17**	0	**13.6**	.368	.333	**.724**	**1.3**	**1.5**	**.5**	.0	6.2
2017–18	Boston	4	0	10.0	**.609**	**.500**	–	.8	1.0	.0	.0	**8.5**
Career		21	0	12.9	.415	.368	.724	1.2	1.4	.4	.0	6.7
