= Justin Anderson (basketball) =

American basketball player (born 1993)

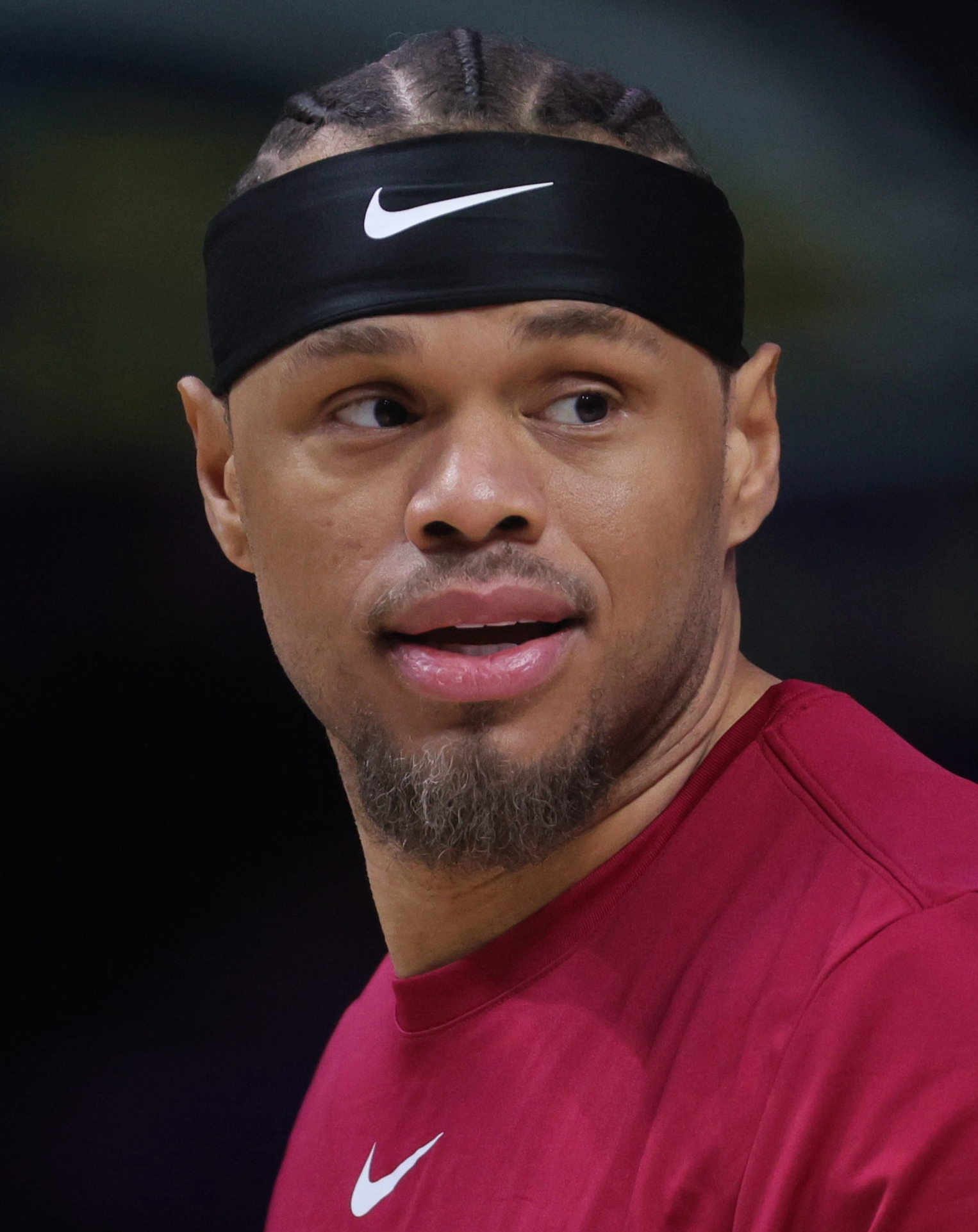
- Anderson with FC Barcelona in 2025

No. 1 – Dubai Basketball
- Position: Small forward
- League: ABA League; EuroLeague

Personal information
- Born: November 19, 1993 (age 33) Montross, Virginia, U.S.
- Listed height: 6 ft 5 in (1.96 m)
- Listed weight: 231 lb (105 kg)

Career information
- High school: Montrose Christian (Rockville, Maryland)
- College: Virginia (2012–2015)
- NBA draft: 2015: 1st round, 21st overall pick
- Drafted by: Dallas Mavericks
- Playing career: 2015–present

Career history
- 2015–2017: Dallas Mavericks
- 2015–2016: →Texas Legends
- 2017–2018: Philadelphia 76ers
- 2018–2019: Atlanta Hawks
- 2019–2020: Raptors 905
- 2020: Brooklyn Nets
- 2020: Long Island Nets
- 2021–2023: Fort Wayne Mad Ants
- 2021: Cleveland Cavaliers
- 2022: Indiana Pacers
- 2023: Río Breogán
- 2023–2024: Valencia
- 2024–2025: FC Barcelona
- 2025–present: Dubai Basketball

Career highlights
- All-NBA G League First Team (2022); 2× All-NBA G League Third Team (2020, 2023); Third-team All-American – NABC (2015); Second-team All-ACC (2015); ACC Sixth Man of the Year (2014)
- Stats at NBA.com
- Stats at Basketball Reference
Medals
Men’s basketball
Representing United States
FIBA World U17 Championship
Gold medal – first place	2010 Hamburg	National team
FIBA Americas U16 World Championship
Gold medal – first place	2009 Argentina

Justin Lamar Anderson (born November 19, 1993) is an American professional basketball player for Dubai Basketball of the ABA League and the EuroLeague. He played college basketball for the Virginia Cavaliers before being selected with the 21st overall pick in the 2015 NBA draft by the Dallas Mavericks.

== High school career ==
Anderson attended Montrose Christian School where he averaged 17.8 points, 4.7 rebounds, 3.0 assists, 1.8 steals and 1.6 blocks per game as a senior and won several awards, among them, the Gatorade Maryland Boys Basketball Player of the Year. He was a Top 100 Recruit by ESPN and Rivals.com.

College recruiting
Name	Hometown	School	Height	Weight	Commit date
Justin Anderson; SF	Montross, Virginia	Montrose Christian School	6 ft 6 in (1.98 m)	207 lb (94 kg)	May 26, 2011
Justin Anderson; SF	Recruit ratings: Scout: Rivals: 247Sports: ESPN:				
Overall recruit ranking: Scout: 63 Rivals: 35 247Sports: 51 ESPN: 49
Note: In many cases, Scout, Rivals, 247Sports, On3, and ESPN may conflict in their listings of height and weight.; In these cases, the average was taken. ESPN grades are on a 100-point scale.; Sources: "Virginia 2012 Basketball Commitments". Rivals.; "2012 Virginia Commits". Scout.; "ESPN". ESPN.; "Scout.com Team Recruiting Rankings". Scout.; "2012 Team Ranking". Rivals.

== College career ==
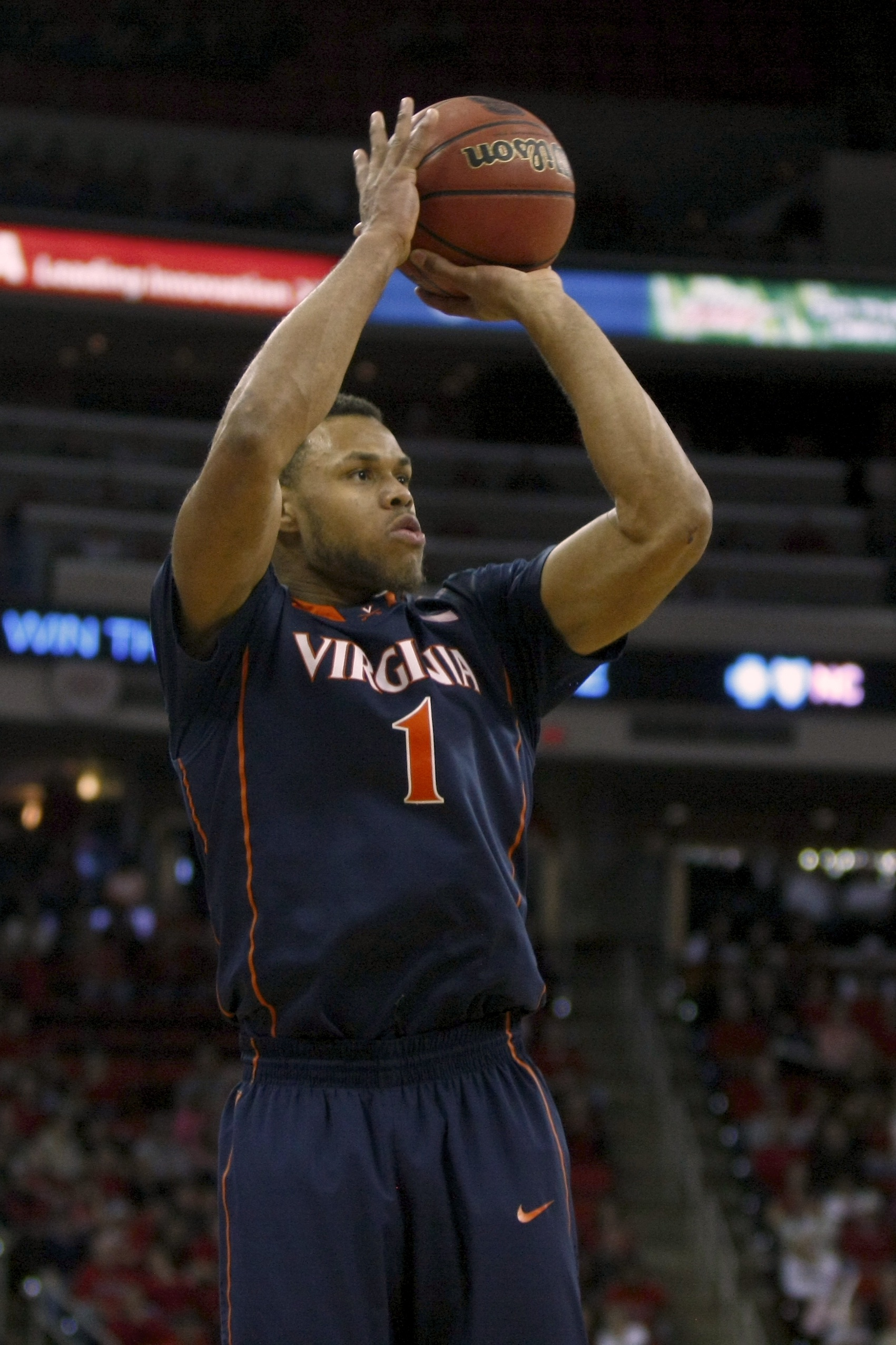
Anderson with Virginia in 2014

Anderson originally verbally committed to Maryland, but later changed his commitment following Gary Williams’ retirement. On November 12, 2011, Anderson signed a National Letter of Intent to play for Virginia.

Anderson primarily played off the bench his first two seasons at Virginia. His play during his sophomore year garnered him Atlantic Coast Conference (ACC) Sixth Man of the Year honors.

Following the graduation of Joe Harris, Anderson was inserted into the starting lineup. A fractured finger against Louisville and an appendectomy forced Anderson to miss the last eight games of the regular season, but he returned in time for Virginia's first game of the ACC tournament. After putting up career-high numbers in scoring and other offensive categories, Anderson was named second-team All-ACC and third-team All-American by the NABC. On April 13, 2015, Anderson declared for the NBA draft, forgoing his senior year.

== Professional career ==
=== Dallas Mavericks (2015–2017) ===
On June 25, 2015, Anderson was selected by the Dallas Mavericks with the 21st overall pick in the 2015 NBA draft. He joined the Mavericks for the 2015 NBA Summer League, where he averaged 17.5 points, 4.2 rebounds, 1.5 assists and 1.2 steals in six games. On August 1, 2015, he signed a 2-year, $3 million rookie scale contract with the Mavericks. He made his debut for the Mavericks in their season opener on October 28, 2015, recording two points and one rebound in a 111–95 win over the Phoenix Suns. On November 10, 2015, he scored a then season-high 11 points on 4-of-4 shooting in a 120–105 loss to the New Orleans Pelicans. On February 5, 2016, he set a new season high with 13 points in a 116–90 loss to the San Antonio Spurs. On April 8, 2016, he recorded his first career double-double with 19 points and 10 rebounds (both career highs) in a 103–93 win over the Memphis Grizzlies. During his rookie season, he received multiple assignments to the Texas Legends, the Mavericks' D-League affiliate.

In July 2016, Anderson re-joined the Mavericks for the 2016 NBA Summer League, where he averaged 16.0 points, 7.0 rebounds and 2.6 assists in five games. On November 9, 2016, he had a season-best game with 16 points, eight rebounds and seven assists in a 116–95 loss to the Golden State Warriors. On January 22, 2017, he scored a season-high 19 points in a 122–73 win over the Los Angeles Lakers.

=== Philadelphia 76ers (2017–2018) ===
On February 23, 2017, Anderson was traded, along with Andrew Bogut and a protected first-round pick, to the Philadelphia 76ers in exchange for Nerlens Noel. On March 3, 2017, he made the go-ahead basket with 24.3 seconds left and matched his career high with 19 points in the 76ers' 105–102 victory over the New York Knicks. Three days later, he had another 19-point effort in a 112–98 loss to the Milwaukee Bucks. On March 17, 2017, he had his fifth career 19-point game (fourth time in 2016–17) in a 116–74 win over his former team, the Dallas Mavericks. In the 76ers' season finale on April 12, 2017, Anderson had a 26-point effort in a 114–113 loss to the Knicks.

In a win over the Milwaukee Bucks on April 11, 2018, Anderson scored a season-high 25 points and had six rebounds.

=== Atlanta Hawks (2018–2019) ===
On July 25, 2018, Anderson was traded to the Atlanta Hawks in a three-team deal involving the 76ers and the Oklahoma City Thunder. On March 31, 2019, he set season highs with 24 points and 12 rebounds in a 136–135 overtime win over the Milwaukee Bucks. On June 29, 2019, the Hawks declined Anderson's contract extension, making him an unrestricted free agent.

=== Raptors 905 (2019–2020) ===
On September 26, 2019, Anderson signed with the Washington Wizards for training camp. On October 16, 2019, Anderson was waived by the Wizards after appearing in the team's four preseason games. On November 25, 2019, the Raptors 905 announced that they had claimed Anderson off waivers.

=== Brooklyn Nets (2020) ===
On January 6, 2020, Anderson signed a ten-day contract with the Brooklyn Nets. On January 15, he was released by the Nets.

=== Return to the 905 (2020) ===
Anderson rejoined the Raptors 905 after the expiration of his 10-day contract with the Nets.

=== Long Island Nets (2020) ===
On January 21, 2020, the Raptors 905 traded Anderson to the Long Island Nets in exchange for Henry Ellenson.

=== Return to Brooklyn (2020) ===
On July 18, 2020, the Nets announced that they had signed Anderson for the remainder of the 2019–20 NBA season.

On December 3, Anderson signed a partially guaranteed 2-year, $4 million contract to return to the Philadelphia 76ers. He was waived at the conclusion of training camp.

=== Cleveland Cavaliers / Fort Wayne Mad Ants (2021) ===
On September 23, 2021, the Fort Wayne Mad Ants acquired the rights to Anderson in a trade with the Long Island Nets.

On October 15, Anderson signed an Exhibit 10 contract with the Indiana Pacers. He was waived the next day and subsequently joined the Mad Ants. In 11 games, he averaged 14.3 points, 6.5 rebounds, 2.9 assists and 1.0 steals in 33.8 minutes per contest.

On December 21, 2021, Anderson signed a 10-day contract with the Cleveland Cavaliers.

=== Indiana Pacers / Fort Wayne Mad Ants (2022–2023) ===
On January 1, 2022, Anderson signed a 10-day contract with the Indiana Pacers and on January 11, Anderson was reacquired by the Fort Wayne Mad Ants after his 10-day contract expired.

On March 17, 2022, Anderson signed a second 10-day contract with the Pacers and on March 28, he signed another one.

On October 24, 2022, Anderson rejoined the Fort Wayne Mad Ants roster for training camp.

=== Río Breogán (2023) ===
On October 25, 2023, Anderson signed with Río Breogán. It was his first experience in European basketball, taking part in the Liga ACB and the Basketball Champions League.

=== Valencia Basket (2023–2024) ===
On December 24, 2023, Anderson signed with Valencia Basket, continuing to play in the Liga ACB and earning his first experience in the EuroLeague. On July 9, 2024, Anderson parted ways with the Spanish club.

=== FC Barcelona (2024–2025) ===
On July 25, 2024, FC Barcelona announced Anderson as a new player on a one-season deal through June 30, 2025. With Barcelona, Anderson was named Player of the Round for round 14 of the 2024-25 ACB season, scoring 25 points in a loss against Bàsquet Girona. On June 17, 2025, Barcelona announced that Anderson would be leaving the team upon his contract's expiry on June 30.

=== Dubai Basketball (2025–present) ===
On June 17, 2025, Anderson signed with Dubai Basketball of the ABA League and the EuroLeague.

== Career statistics ==
Legend
GP	Games played	GS	Games started	MPG	Minutes per game
FG%	Field-goal percentage	3P%	3-point field-goal percentage	FT%	Free-throw percentage
RPG	Rebounds per game	APG	Assists per game	SPG	Steals per game
BPG	Blocks per game	PPG	Points per game	PIR	Performance index rating
**Bold**	Career high

=== NBA ===
==== Regular season ====
Year	Team	GP	GS	MPG	FG%	3P%	FT%	RPG	APG	SPG	BPG	PPG
2015–16	Dallas	**55**	**9**	11.8	.406	.265	**.800**	2.4	.5	.3	.5	3.8
2016–17	Dallas	51	2	13.9	.402	.303	.795	2.9	.6	**.5**	.3	6.5
2016–17	Philadelphia	24	8	**21.6**	.466	.292	.780	**4.0**	1.4	**.5**	.3	**8.5**
2017–18	Philadelphia	38	0	13.7	.431	.330	.737	2.4	.7	.4	.2	6.2
2018–19	Atlanta	48	4	9.6	.408	.312	.743	1.8	.5	**.5**	.3	3.7
2019–20	Brooklyn	10	1	10.7	.263	.207	.500	2.1	.8	.0	**.6**	2.8
2021–22	Cleveland	3	0	15.7	**.500**	**.333**	.750	2.0	2.0	.3	.0	4.3
2021–22	Indiana	13	6	20.7	.368	.245	**.800**	3.1	**2.1**	**.5**	.5	6.8
Career		242	30	13.6	.410	.292	.775	2.6	.8	.4	.3	5.3

==== Playoffs ====
Year	Team	GP	GS	MPG	FG%	3P%	FT%	RPG	APG	SPG	BPG	PPG
2016	Dallas	5	**1**	**19.0**	**.459**	.308	.643	**4.0**	**1.4**	**.8**	**.6**	**9.4**
2018	Philadelphia	**7**	0	4.7	.375	.286	-	1.3	.0	.1	.0	1.1
2020	Brooklyn	3	0	9.3	.417	**.455**	**1.000**	2.7	1.0	.0	.3	6.3
Career		15	1	10.4	.439	.355	.755	2.5	.7	.3	.3	4.9

=== EuroLeague ===
Year	Team	GP	GS	MPG	FG%	3P%	FT%	RPG	APG	SPG	BPG	PPG	PIR
2023–24	Valencia	18	11	18.6	.457	.333	.692	2.2	.6	.4	.2	6.1	3.8
2024–25	Barcelona	**37**	**18**	**19.3**	**.626**	**.413**	**.881**	**2.8**	**1.4**	**.7**	**.3**	**7.1**	**8.5**
Career		55	29	19.1	.609	.383	.836	2.6	1.1	.6	.3	6.8	6.9

=== Domestic leagues ===
Year	Team	League	GP	MPG	FG%	3P%	FT%	RPG	APG	SPG	BPG	PPG
2023–24	(Spain) Breogán	ACB	8	24.0	.367	.278	.893	3.0	2.0	1.5	1.0	11.6
2023–24	(Spain) Valencia	ACB	19	20.5	.448	.393	.919	2.3	1.2	.7	.5	8.5
2024–25	(Spain) Barcelona	ACB	33	19.2	.489	.474	.879	2.6	.7	.3	.3	8.3

=== College ===
Year	Team	GP	GS	MPG	FG%	3P%	FT%	RPG	APG	SPG	BPG	PPG
2012–13	Virginia	35	17	24.0	.420	.303	.764	3.3	**2.3**	**0.9**	**1.2**	7.6
2013–14	Virginia	**37**	5	21.5	.407	.294	.716	3.2	1.5	0.4	0.8	7.8
2014–15	Virginia	26	**23**	**27.8**	**.466**	**.452**	**.780**	**4.0**	1.7	0.7	0.5	**12.2**
Career		98	45	24.1	.430	.357	.752	3.5	1.8	0.6	0.9	8.9

== Personal life ==
Anderson is the son of Kim and Edward Anderson II. He has an older sister, Eurisha, and an older brother, Edward III, who played basketball for the University of Mary Washington.

=== Community involvement ===
Anderson is a member of the "Starting Five", along with Malcolm Brogdon, Joe Harris, Anthony Tolliver, and Garrett Temple. Their goal was to raise $225,000 through Hoops2O, founded by Brogdon, to fund five wells in East Africa by the end of the 2018–19 season. Anderson traveled with Brogdon and Harris to Tanzania to witness the opening of the first well they funded in July 2019, and by November Hoops2O had raised nearly $400,000. By February 2020, the charity had funded the construction of ten wells in Tanzania and Kenya, bringing water to over 52,000 citizens.
