= Pierre Jackson =

American basketball player (born 1991)

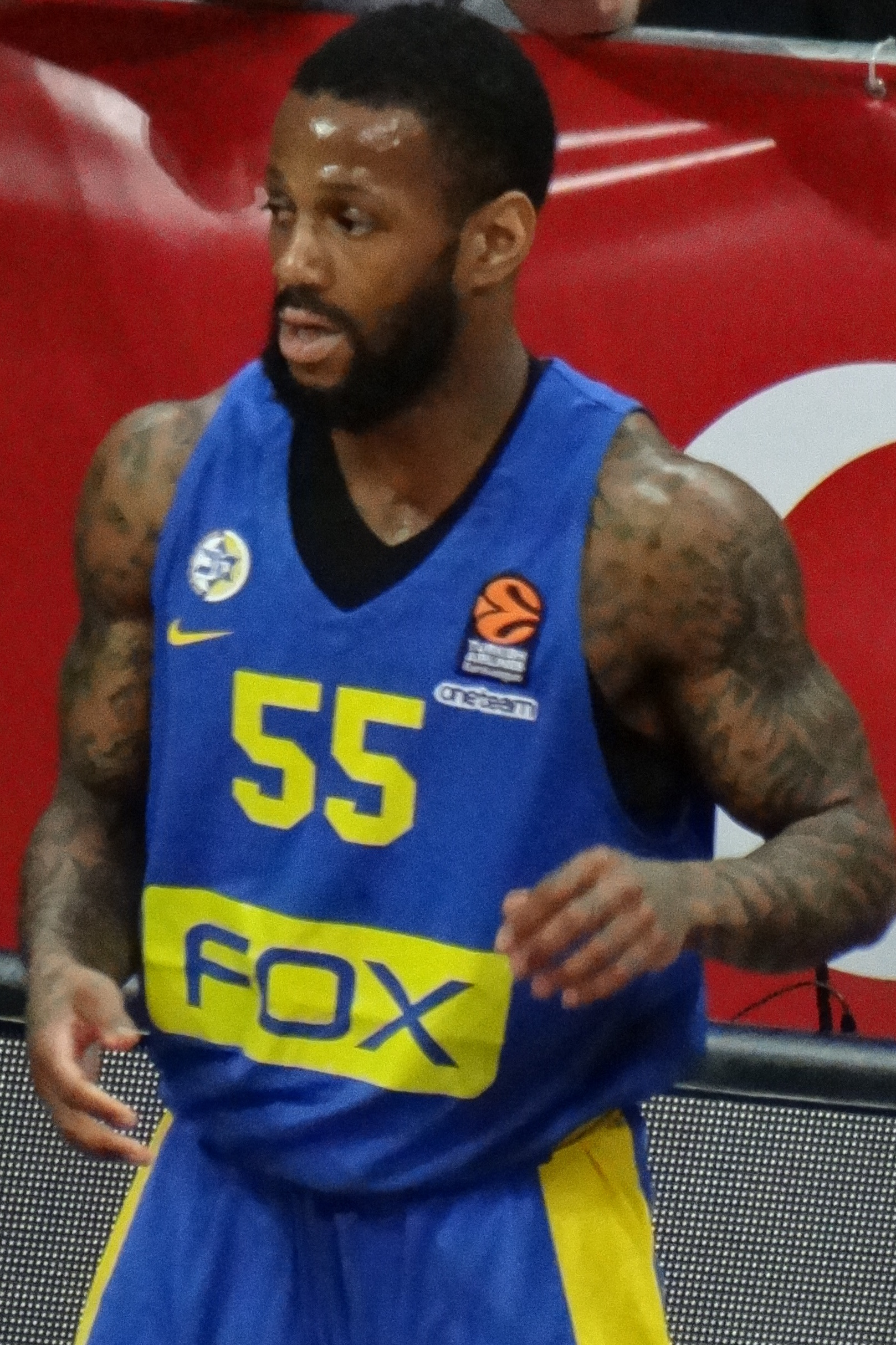
- Jackson with Maccabi Tel Aviv in 2018

No. 55 – Al Ittihad Alexandria
- Position: Point guard
- League: Egyptian Basketball Premier League

Personal information
- Born: August 29, 1991 (age 35) Las Vegas, Nevada, U.S.
- Listed height: 5 ft 11 in (1.80 m)
- Listed weight: 176 lb (80 kg)

Career information
- High school: Desert Pines (Las Vegas, Nevada)
- College: College of Southern Idaho (2009–2011); Baylor (2011–2013)
- NBA draft: 2013: 2nd round, 42nd overall pick
- Drafted by: Philadelphia 76ers
- Playing career: 2013–present

Career history
- 2013–2014: Idaho Stampede
- 2014: Fenerbahçe
- 2016: Idaho Stampede
- 2016: Cedevita
- 2016–2017: Texas Legends
- 2016–2017: Dallas Mavericks
- 2017–2018: Maccabi Tel Aviv
- 2018: Beijing Fly Dragons
- 2019–2020: Shenzhen Leopards
- 2020: South Bay Lakers
- 2020: Panathinaikos B.C.
- 2021: Galatasaray
- 2021: JL Bourg
- 2021–2022: South Bay Lakers
- 2022: Afyon Belediye S.K.
- 2022–2023: Xinjiang Flying Tigers
- 2023: Wuhan Kunpeng
- 2023–2024: Sagesse
- 2024: Nanjing Monkey Kings
- 2024: Al Ahly Benghazi
- 2024: Anhui Wenyi
- 2025: Capitanes de Arecibo
- 2025: Changsha Yongsheng
- 2025–present: Al Ittihad Alexandria

Career highlights
- CBA scoring champion (2019); Israeli League champion (2018); Israeli League Cup winner (2017); Israeli League All-Star (2018); Israeli League All-Star Game MVP (2018); Croatian League champion (2016); Turkish League champion (2014); 2× NBA D-League All-Star (2014, 2017); NIT champion (2013); NIT Most Outstanding Player (2013); AP Honorable Mention All-American (2012); 2× Second-team All-Big 12 (2012, 2013); Big 12 All-Rookie team (2012); NJCAA National Player of the Year (2011); NJCAA first-team All-American (2011); NJCAA Tournament MVP (2011)
- Stats at NBA.com
- Stats at Basketball Reference

Pierre Deshawn Jackson (born August 29, 1991) is an American professional basketball player for Al Ittihad Alexandria of the Egyptian Basketball Premier League. He played college basketball for the College of Southern Idaho and Baylor University in which he was one of the top college players in the 2012–13 season. Following stints in Europe and the NBA D-League, Jackson played one season in the NBA with the Dallas Mavericks.

== High school and junior college career ==
Jackson attended Desert Pines High School in Las Vegas. Following a standout career, where he led the state of Nevada in assists as a senior, he went to the College of Southern Idaho (CSI). At CSI, Jackson led the Golden Eagles to a National Junior College Athletic Association (NJCAA) National Championship in 2011, earning tournament MVP honors. He averaged 18.6 points and 4.4 assists per game in 2010–11 and was named a first-team All-American and the NJCAA Player of the Year at the conclusion of the season.

== College career ==
After concluding his junior college career, Jackson moved to Baylor to complete his college career. He had a strong junior campaign for the Bears, averaging 13.8 points and 5.9 assists in the 2011–12 season. He helped lead Baylor to the Elite Eight of the 2012 NCAA Tournament, where they lost to eventual champions Kentucky. Jackson was named second team All-Big 12 Conference and an honorable mention All-American by the Associated Press.

Jackson returned to Baylor for his senior season in 2012–13. He was named the Big 12 preseason Player of the Year and was named to the preseason watch lists for the Wooden and Naismith national player of the year awards.

On April 4, 2013, Jackson ended his college career with a championship win over Iowa at the National Invitation Tournament (NIT). As a senior, he averaged 19.8 points and 7.1 assists per game.

== Professional career ==
=== D-League and Turkey ===
Jackson was selected with the 42nd overall pick in the 2013 NBA draft by the Philadelphia 76ers. On July 12, 2013, his draft rights were traded, along with Jrue Holiday, to the New Orleans Pelicans in exchange for Nerlens Noel. Two days later, he joined the Pelicans for the 2013 NBA Summer League.

On July 27, 2013, Jackson signed a one-year deal with ASVEL Villeurbanne of the LNB Pro A. However, he left the team in September 2013 before appearing in a game for them.

On November 1, 2013, Jackson was selected with the fourth overall pick in the 2013 NBA D-League draft by the Idaho Stampede. On February 3, 2014, he was named to the Futures All-Star roster for the 2014 NBA D-League All-Star Game. On February 1, 2014, he recorded a career-high 18 assists in a 127–123 win over the Los Angeles D-Fenders. On February 4, 2014, he scored 58 points against the Texas Legends, setting the D-League single-game scoring record. This surpassed the previous record of 53 by Morris Almond (2008) and Will Conroy (2009). This effort also established the single-half (2nd) record of 38 points. Although the single-game record was surpassed twice in 2016 (first by Jordan McRae, with 61, and then by Russ Smith, with 65), the single-half record stood until Tarik Phillip posted 39 in a half on February 24, 2019.

On February 20, 2014, Jackson left the Idaho Stampede in order to sign in Turkey. The next day, he signed with Fenerbahçe Ülker for the rest of the 2013–14 season. On April 10, 2014, he parted ways with Fenerbahçe after just six games. He averaged 3.3 points and 1.3 assists over those six games.

=== Philadelphia 76ers ===
On June 27, 2014, the Pelicans traded Jackson's rights back to the Philadelphia 76ers in exchange for Russ Smith's draft rights. On July 1, 2014, he joined the 76ers for the 2014 NBA Summer League. In game one of the 76ers' Orlando Summer League schedule on July 5, he ruptured his right Achilles during the first half of their 77–83 loss to the Orlando Magic. Despite the injury, he signed a one-year, partially guaranteed contract with the 76ers on July 24, 2014, only to be waived on September 30 after he was ruled out for six to 12 months.

On July 15, 2015, Jackson re-signed with the 76ers after averaging 12 points per game in two Las Vegas Summer League games. However, he was later waived by the 76ers on October 26 after appearing in three preseason games.

=== Return to the D-League ===
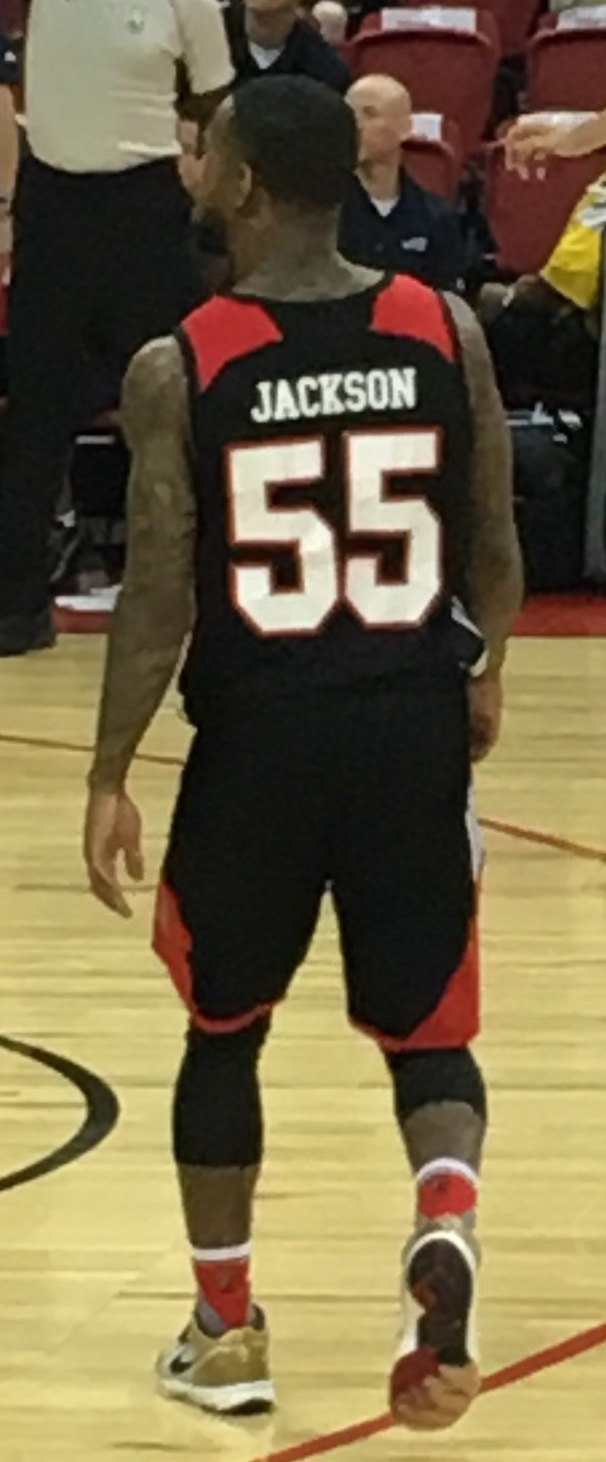
Jackson in July 2016

On January 6, 2016, Jackson was reacquired by the Idaho Stampede. He made his season debut for the Stampede three days later in a 98–92 win over the Fort Wayne Mad Ants, recording six points, one rebound, two assists and one steal in 11 minutes of action off the bench. On March 4, he was traded to the Texas Legends in exchange for the returning player rights to Eric Griffin. On March 20, he waived by the Legends before appearing in a game for them.

In July 2016, Jackson joined the Portland Trail Blazers for the 2016 NBA Summer League.

=== Croatia ===
On October 18, 2016, Jackson signed a one-month deal with Croatian club Cedevita Zagreb. In his time with Cedevita, he appeared in two EuroCup games and five ABA League games.

=== Texas Legends and Dallas Mavericks ===
On November 30, 2016, Jackson was reacquired by the Texas Legends. After appearing in 10 games for the Legends, he signed with the Dallas Mavericks on December 27, 2016. That night, he made his NBA debut in a 123–107 loss to the Houston Rockets, recording seven points, one rebound and two assists in 11 minutes off the bench. On January 6, 2017, he was waived by the Mavericks. Two days later, he was reacquired by the Texas Legends. He returned to the Mavericks on January 15, signing a 10-day contract with the team. On January 25, he signed a second 10-day contract with the Mavericks. He made his first career start in the Mavericks' game against the Oklahoma City Thunder on January 26, and recorded nine points, two rebounds and four assists in 13 minutes before leaving the game in the first half with a left hamstring strain. He was subsequently waived two days later, and immediately re-joined the Legends. On February 6, 2017, he was named in the Western Conference All-Star team for the 2017 NBA D-League All-Star Game.

=== Israel ===
On July 14, 2017, Jackson signed a one-year deal, with an option for another season, with Maccabi Tel Aviv of the Israeli Premier League and the EuroLeague. In his first Euroleague game for Maccabi, Jackson starred with 27 points, 9 assists and 7 rebounds in an 88–71 win over Brose Bamberg. He was subsequently named MVP of Round 1. On March 2, 2018, Jackson participated in the Israeli League All-Star Game, where he recorded 18 points and 6 assists and was named All-Star Game MVP. That season, Jackson helped Maccabi to win the Israeli League Cup and the Israeli League Championship.

=== China ===
On July 4, 2018, Jackson signed with the Beijing Fly Dragons of the Chinese Basketball Association. On October 25, 2018, Jackson scored a career-high 67 points (including 10 3-pointers) and 10 assists in a 136–137 loss to the Shenzhen Leopards. He left the team in late December 2018.

In July 2019, Jackson signed with the Shenzhen Leopards.

=== South Bay Lakers ===
On January 17, 2020, Jackson was acquired by the South Bay Lakers. On February 29, 2020, he recorded a season-high 38 points including six 3-pointers in a 123–118 win over the Agua Caliente Clippers.

=== Greece ===
On August 9, 2020, Jackson officially signed a one-year contract with Panathinaikos of the Greek Basket League and the EuroLeague. On September 23, 2020, he played in the semi-final of the Greek Basketball Super Cup, he was injured and left the team on October 13.

=== Return to Turkey ===
On February 17, 2021, he has signed with Galatasaray of the Turkish Basketball Super League (BSL).

=== France ===
On May 11, 2021, he has signed with JL Bourg Basket of the LNB Pro A.

=== Return to South Bay Lakers ===
On December 31, 2021, the South Bay Lakers acquired Jackson. He was then later waived on January 17, 2022.

=== Return to Turkey ===
On January 22, 2022, Jackson signed with HDI Sigorta Afyon Belediye of the Basketbol Süper Ligi (BSL).

=== Libya ===
On February 22, 2024, Jackson was announced by Libyan club Al Ahly Ly of the Basketball Africa League (BAL). On April 19, Jackson made his debut with 20 points, 7 rebounds and 11 assists in a 93–71 win over Bangui. He left the team before the beginning of the playoffs in May.

== Career statistics ==
Legend
GP	Games played	MPG	Minutes per game	FG%	Field goal percentage
3P%	3-point field goal percentage	FT%	Free throw percentage	RPG	Rebounds per game
APG	Assists per game	SPG	Steals per game	BPG	Blocks per game
PPG	Points per game	**Bold**	Career high		Led the league

Year	Team	League	GP	MPG	FG%	3P%	FT%	RPG	APG	SPG	BPG	PPG
2013–14	Idaho Stampede	NBA D-League	**31**	**41.5**	.449	.349	.737	3.6	6.2	1.9	**.1**	29.1
2013–14	Fenerbahçe	EuroLeague	6	7.8	.333	.000	.714	1.3	1.3	.3	.0	3.3
2016–17	KK Cedevita	ABA League	5	24.6	.463	.414	.773	1.2	6.6	**2.4**	.0	15.8
2016–17	Dallas Mavericks	NBA	8	10.5	.333	.273	.857	1.1	2.4	.3	.0	4.4
2016–17	Texas Legends	NBA D-League	28	35.3	**.494**	.372	.835	4.3	7.7	1.9	**.1**	22.5
2017–18	Maccabi Tel Aviv	IBPL	21	23.1	.399	.337	.725	2.2	5.3	1.4	.0	11.7
2017–18	Maccabi Tel Aviv	EuroLeague	29	25.1	.411	**.462**	.862	2.9	4.2	1.0	.0	14.5
2018–19	Beijing Fly Dragons	CBA	25	40.6	.483	.424	.907	**6.0**	**9.3**	2.3	**.1**	**39.8**
2019–20	Shenzhen Leopards	CBA	2	36.0	.379	.421	.941	3.5	6.0	2.0	.0	23.0
2019–20	South Bay Lakers	NBA G League	16	32.9	.438	.399	.857	3.9	5.9	1.9	**.1**	20.7
2020–21	Panathinaikos B.C.	Greek Basketball Super Cup	1	15.0	.000	.000	-	1.0	3.0	.0	.0	.0
2020–21	Galatasaray	BSL	7	32.2	.415	.273	.935	3.6	8.9	1.3	.0	19.4
2020–21	JL Bourg	Jeep Élite	2	8.5	.333	.000	.667	.0	.5	.5	.0	4.0
2021–22	South Bay Lakers	NBA G League	3	28.3	.343	.294	**1.000**	3.3	6.0	.3	.0	11.3
2021–22	Afyon Belediye S.K.	BSL	5	31.0	.471	.414	.846	3.2	3.4	1.0	.0	14.2
2022–23	Xinjiang Flying Tigers	CBA	10	20.6	.368	.273	.679	3.1	5.1	1.9	**0.2**	11.2
Career		All Leagues	199	31.0	.452	.391	.824	3.5	6.1	1.6	.1	21.7

== Personal life ==
Jackson has a daughter and son.
