= 2006–07 Chinese Basketball Association season =

2006–07 CBA season
- League: Chinese Basketball Association
- Sport: Basketball
- Duration: October 7, 2006 – March 28, 2007
- TV partner(s): CCTV-5; Dragon TV; STAR Sports and local channels

Regular Season
- Season champions: Guangdong Southern Tigers
- Season MVP: (China) Tang Zhengdong

Playoffs

Finals
- Champions: Bayi Rockets
- Runners-up: Guangdong Southern Tigers
- Finals MVP: (China) Wang Zhizhi

CBA seasons
- ← 2005–06 2007–08 →

The 2006–07 CBA season is the 12th CBA season.

The season ran from October 7, 2006 to March 28, 2007. The North-South Division system was abolished. Zhejiang Lions joined the CBA in this season.

== Foreign Players ==
=== Draft ===
The draft for foreign players was held in Eugene, United States.

Rnd.	Pick	Player	Nationality (Note: Nationality indicates the player's national team or representative nationality. If a player has not competed at the international level, then the nationality indicates the national team which the player is eligible to represent according to FIBA rules.)	Team
1	1	Tyrone Washington	USA	Shanxi Brave Dragons
1	2	Anthony Myles	USA	Dongguan Leopards
1	3	Brandon Crump	USA	Shaanxi Kylins
1	4	Herve Lamizana	CIV	Shandong Lions
1	5	Soumaila Samake	MLI	Zhejiang Cyclones
1	6	Chris Porter	USA	Fujian Sturgeons
1	7	Reggie Okosa	NGR	Shanghai Sharks
1	8	Darius Rice	USA	Jilin Northeast Tigers
1	9	Ernest Brown	USA	Liaoning Hunters
1	10	Ken Johnson	USA	Yunnan Bulls
1	11	Lorenzo Coleman	USA	Xinjiang Flying Tigers
1	12	Garnett Thompson	USA	Jiangsu Dragons
1	13	Micah Brand	USA	Beijing Ducks
1	14	Jason Dixon	USA	Guangdong Southern Tigers
2	1	God Shammgod	USA	Shanxi Brave Dragons
2	2	Michael Fey	USA	Dongguan Leopards
2	3	Jerod Ward	USA	Shaanxi Kylins
2	4	Mack Tuck	USA	Shandong Lions
2	5	Kevin Freeman	USA	Zhejiang Cyclones
2	6	Kit Rhymer	USA	Fujian Sturgeons
2	7	Jermaine Dearman	USA	Shanghai Sharks
2	8	Babacar Camara	SEN	Jilin Northeast Tigers
2	9	Robert Jackson	USA	Liaoning Hunters
2	10	Wil Frisby	USA	Yunnan Bulls
2	11	Doug Wrenn	USA	Xinjiang Flying Tigers
2	12	Carlos Dixon	USA	Jiangsu Dragons
2	13	Robby Joyner	USA	Beijing Ducks
2	14	Terrence Green	USA	Guangdong Southern Tigers
3	1	Rashid Byrd	USA	Shanxi Brave Dragons
3	2	Tyler Smith	USA	Dongguan Leopards
3	3	Mike Jensen	USA	Shaanxi Kylins
3	4	Eddy Fobbs	USA	Shandong Lions
3	5	Curtis Millage	USA	Zhejiang Cyclones
3	6	Eric Sandrin	USA	Fujian Sturgeons
3	7	Reggie Butler	USA	Shanghai Sharks
3	8	Alexus Foyle	USA	Jilin Northeast Tigers
3	9	Pat Simpson	USA	Liaoning Hunters
3	10	Dontay Harris	USA	Yunnan Bulls
3	11	Galen Young	USA	Xinjiang Flying Tigers
3	12	Albert White	USA	Jiangsu Dragons
3	13	Mohamed Woni	USA	Beijing Ducks
3	14	Michael Ford	USA	Guangdong Southern Tigers
4	1	Damon Jackson	USA	Shanxi Brave Dragons
4	2	Alvin Cruz	PUR	Dongguan Leopards
4	3	Darnell Miller	USA	Shaanxi Kylins
4	4	Alan Daniels	USA	Shandong Lions
4	5	Brandon Hawkins	USA	Zhejiang Cyclones
4	6	Chuks Neboh	USA	Fujian Sturgeons
4	7	Simeon Haley	USA	Shanghai Sharks
4	8	Bonell Colas	USA	Jilin Northeast Tigers
4	9	John Bryant	USA	Liaoning Hunters
4	10	Eric Fiegi	USA	Yunnan Bulls
4	11	Noah Brown	USA	Xinjiang Flying Tigers
4	12	Ryan Rourke	USA	Jiangsu Dragons
4	13	Kenny Tate	USA	Beijing Ducks
4	14	Obie Trotter	USA	Guangdong Southern Tigers

== Regular Season Standings ==
#	2006–07 CBA season							
#	Team	W	L	PCT	GB	Home	Road	Tiebreaker
1	Guangdong Southern Tigers	26	4	.866	-	14–1	12–3	
2	Bayi Rockets	25	5	.833	1	14–1	11–4	
3	Jiangsu Dragons	23	7	.767	3	14–1	9–6	
4	Liaoning Hunters	20	10	.667	6	15–0	5–10	
5	Shandong Lions	19	11	.633	7	11–4	8–7	SD 4-0; ZJ 1-3, FJ 1-3; ZJ 1-1(173-166) FJ
6	Zhejiang Cyclones	19	11	.633	7	12–3	7–8	SD 4-0; ZJ 1-3, FJ 1-3; ZJ 1-1(173-166) FJ
7	Fujian Xunxing	19	11	.633	7	13–2	6–9	SD 4-0; ZJ 1-3, FJ 1-3; ZJ 1-1(173-166) FJ
8	Shanghai Sharks	17	13	.567	9	11–4	6–9	
9	Xinjiang Flying Tigers	15	15	.500	11	10–5	5–10	
10	Beijing Ducks	14	16	.467	12	10–5	4–11	
11	Jilin Northeast Tigers	11	19	.367	15	8–7	3–12	JL 1-1(246-239) DG
12	Dongguan Leopards	11	19	.367	15	9–6	2–13	JL 1-1(246-239) DG
13	Shaanxi Kylins	9	21	.300	17	6–9	3–12	
14	Zhejiang Lions	6	24	.200	20	6–9	0–15	
15	Shanxi Zhongyu	4	26	.133	22	3–12	1–14	
16	Yunnan Bulls	2	28	.067	24	2–13	0–15	

Key to colors
Top 8 teams advance to the Playoffs

== Playoffs ==
In the first round of the playoffs, top 4 teams may choose their opponents from the other 4 teams, they may also choose their place in the bracket.

In the Final series, Bayi Rockets defeated Guangdong Southern Tigers (4-1).

Teams in bold advanced to the next round. The numbers to the left of each team indicate the team's seeding in regular season, and the numbers to the right indicate the number of games the team won in that round. Home court advantage belongs to the team with the better regular season record; teams enjoying the home advantage are shown in italics.

Quarterfinals; Best of 5
1	**Guangdong Southern Tigers**	**3**
8	Shanghai Sharks	0
3	**Jiangsu Dragons**	**3**
5	Shandong Lions	1
2	**Bayi Rockets**	**3**
6	Zhejiang Cyclones	1
4	**Liaoning Hunters**	**3**
7	Fujian Xunxing	2

Semifinals; Best of 5
1	**Guangdong Southern Tigers**	**3**
3	Jiangsu Dragons	0
2	**Bayi Rockets**	**3**
4	Liaoning Hunters	0

Finals; Best of 7
1	Guangdong Southern Tigers	1
2	**Bayi Rockets**	**4**

== Notes ==
}

== See also ==
- Chinese Basketball Association
