= Yi Jianlian =

Chinese basketball player (born 1987)

Yi Jianlian 易建联
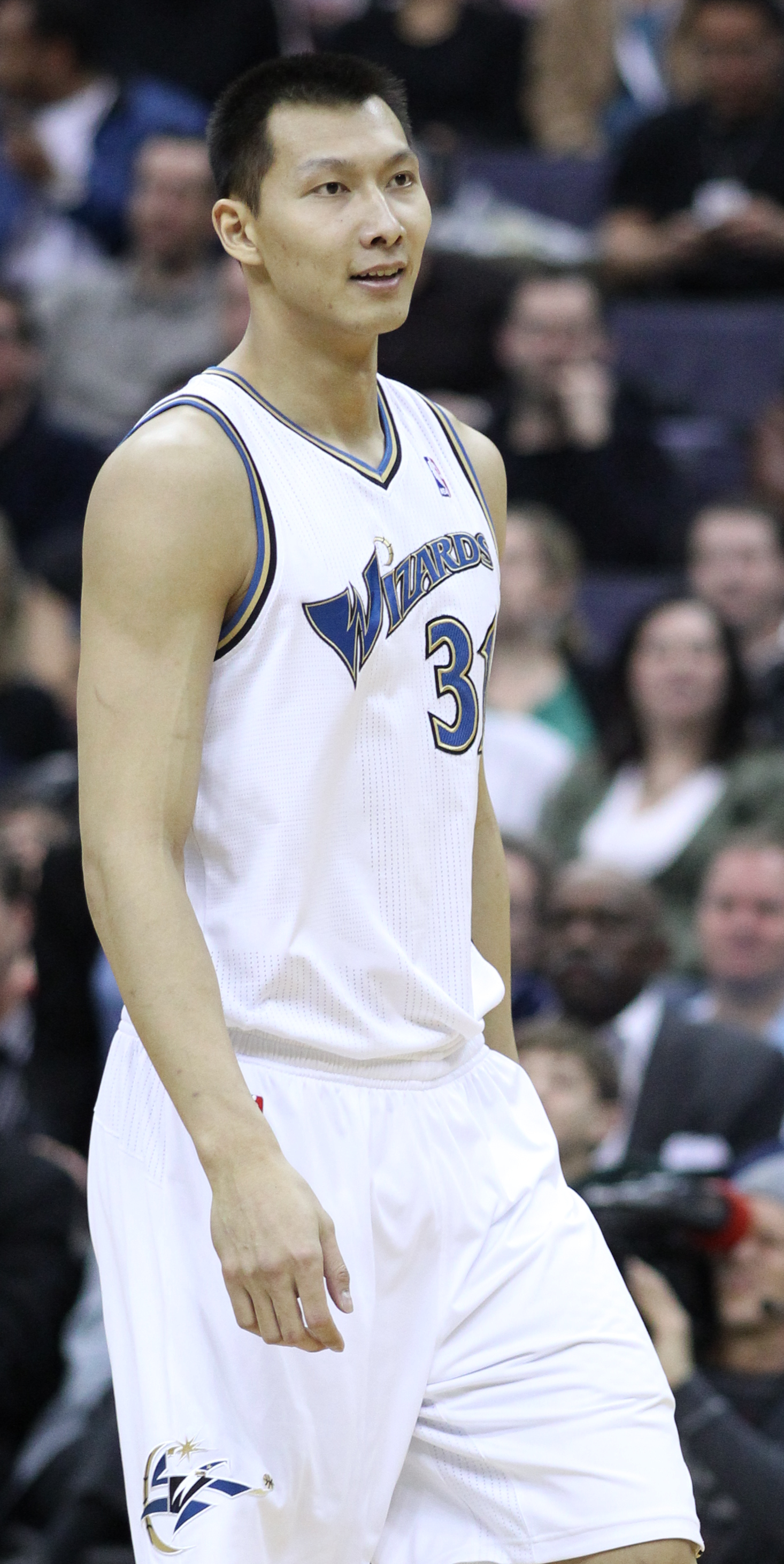
- Yi with the Washington Wizards in 2011

Personal information
- Born: October 27, 1984 (age 42) Heshan, Guangdong, China
- Listed height: 7 ft 0 in (2.13 m)
- Listed weight: 258 lb (117 kg)

Career information
- NBA draft: 2007: 1st round, 6th overall pick
- Drafted by: Milwaukee Bucks
- Playing career: 2002–2023
- Position: Power forward / center
- Number: 3, 9, 31

Career history
- 2002–2007: Guangdong Southern Tigers
- 2007–2008: Milwaukee Bucks
- 2008–2010: New Jersey Nets
- 2010–2011: Washington Wizards
- 2011: Guangdong Southern Tigers
- 2012: Dallas Mavericks
- 2012: →Texas Legends
- 2012–2023: Guangdong Southern Tigers

Career highlights
- 3× FIBA Asia Cup champion (2005, 2011, 2015); 2× FIBA Asia Cup MVP (2011, 2015); 6× CBA champion (2004–2006, 2013, 2019, 2020); 3× CBA Finals MVP (2006, 2013, 2019); 5× CBA Domestic MVP (2013–2016, 2020); 12× CBA All-Star (2004–2007, 2013–2020); 2× CBA Best Defender (2007, 2019); 2× CBA Slam Dunk leader (2015, 2016)

Career NBA statistics
- Points: 2,148 (7.9 ppg)
- Rebounds: 1,339 (4.9 rpg)
- Assists: 192 (0.7 apg)
- Stats at NBA.com
- Stats at Basketball Reference
Medals
Men's basketball
Representing China
FIBA Asia Cup
Gold medal – first place	2005 Doha
Gold medal – first place	2011 Wuhan
Gold medal – first place	2015 Changsha
Silver medal – second place	2009 Tianjin
Asian Games
Gold medal – first place	2006 Doha
East Asian Games
Bronze medal – third place	2005 Macau
FIBA Asia Under-18 Championship
Gold medal – first place	2002 Kuwait
FIBA Asia Under-20 Championship
Silver medal – second place	2004 Tehran

Yi Jianlian
- Traditional Chinese: 易建聯
- Simplified Chinese: 易建联
Transcriptions
Standard Mandarin
- Hanyu Pinyin: Yì Jiànlián
- Wade–Giles: I Chienlien
Yue: Cantonese
- Jyutping: Jik^{6} Gin^{3}lyun^{4}

Yi Jianlian (Chinese: 易建联; pinyin: Yì Jiànlián [î tɕjɛ̂nljɛ̌n]; born October 27, 1984), nicknamed "the Chairman" is a Chinese former professional basketball player who last played for the Guangdong Southern Tigers of the Chinese Basketball Association (CBA). He also played in the National Basketball Association (NBA) for the Milwaukee Bucks, the New Jersey Nets, the Washington Wizards, and the Dallas Mavericks.

Yi joined the Guangdong Southern Tigers for the 2002–03 CBA season, and subsequently won the CBA Rookie of the Year award. In his first five years with Guangdong, the team won three CBA titles. In the 2007 NBA draft, he was selected by the Milwaukee Bucks with the sixth overall pick. Yi declined to sign with Milwaukee for several months but agreed to a contract in August 2007. He later played for three other NBA teams, then returned to the Guangdong Southern Tigers in 2012.

Yi also played for the Chinese national team in the 2004, 2008, 2012 and 2016 Olympics and the 2006 and 2010 FIBA World Championships.

== Early life ==
As a child, Yi's parents did not allow him to enroll in a sports school—institutions designed for children expected to become professional athletes. However, a sports school's basketball coach who saw him playing street basketball persuaded his family to allow him to train professionally. Hoping to sign Yi to an endorsement deal, Adidas invited him to attend the company's ABCD Camp in New Jersey in 2002, where he competed against all-American high school players.

=== Age controversy ===
In 2004, Yi was listed as being born in 1984 (rather than 1987, as previously claimed) during the Four Nation Tournament, but Chinese officials said that it was probably a typographical error. Two years later, Fran Blinebury of The Houston Chronicle reported that Yi told Shane Battier he was 24 years old in an exhibition game before the 2006 FIBA World Championship, but the story was refuted by both Yi and Battier. Yi is not the first Chinese basketball player to come under scrutiny for age discrepancy, as former NBA player Wang Zhizhi had been listed as being born in both 1977 and 1979. In 2006, a senior Chinese official admitted that past youth squads had included players above the permitted age.

In 2007 and 2008, Yi's date of birth was further scrutinized as being October 27, 1984, including a Chinese reporter discovering a high school enrollment form from 1997 that listed Yi as being born on that date.

== Professional career ==
=== Guangdong Southern Tigers (2002–2007) ===
After returning to China in 2002, Yi signed a professional contract with Chinese Basketball Association side Guangdong Southern Tigers and averaged 3.5 points and 1.9 rebounds per game in his first season. He also averaged 7.3 points and 7.3 rebounds per game in four games during the playoffs, and won the Rookie of the Year award. Yi was featured in Time's August 2003 article titled "The Next Yao Ming". In each of his next three seasons, Yi led Guangdong to the CBA championship and he was awarded the CBA Finals Most Valuable Player honor in 2006. In Yi's final season in the Chinese Basketball Association before he entered the 2007 NBA draft, he averaged a career-high 24.9 points and 11.5 rebounds per game, but his team lost to the Bayi Rockets in the playoff finals.

=== Milwaukee Bucks (2007–2008) ===
Yi was not expected to enter the NBA draft until 2009 because the Chinese Basketball Association ruled that players are not allowed to leave for foreign leagues until they turned 22. In early 2006, however, Yi announced that he would enter the 2006 NBA draft although he eventually decided to withdraw, saying he was "not good enough to compete in the NBA and needed more experience." Later that year, the Guangdong Southern Tigers announced that Yi would enter the 2007 NBA draft.

Yi chose Dan Fegan as his agent to represent him in the NBA draft and flew to Los Angeles to participate in pre-NBA draft camps. Before the draft, Yi was predicted by many to be picked anywhere from third to twelfth. On June 28, 2007, Yi was selected by the Milwaukee Bucks with the sixth overall pick in the 2007 NBA draft, despite Fegan warning the Milwaukee Bucks not to pick Yi and not allowing them to be one of the teams invited to Yi's pre-draft private workouts in Los Angeles. Fegan did not want Milwaukee to select Yi because the city of Milwaukee did not have a large Asian-American community. However, Milwaukee's general manager Larry Harris said they had only drafted the best player available to them. Yi and Sun Yue together marked the first time in NBA draft history where two Chinese-born players were selected in the same draft, which was a feat that would not be repeated again until 2016.

After the draft, Milwaukee attempted to convince Yi to sign with the team and on July 2, 2007, the owner of the Bucks franchise, Herb Kohl, wrote a letter to Yi and his representatives, hoping to persuade Yi to sign with the team. Three days later, head coach Larry Krystkowiak and Harris met with Yi, attempting to influence him to play for Milwaukee; however, Yi's representatives requested that the team trade Yi to another team with a city that had a large Chinese presence. Chinese officials also required that any team Yi played for would have to give him sufficient playing time for him to improve for the 2008 Summer Olympics. Kohl made a special trip to Hong Kong to appeal to Yi personally and he assured Chinese officials that Yi would have sufficient playing time. On August 29, 2007, the Milwaukee Bucks and Yi agreed to a standard, multi-year rookie contract.

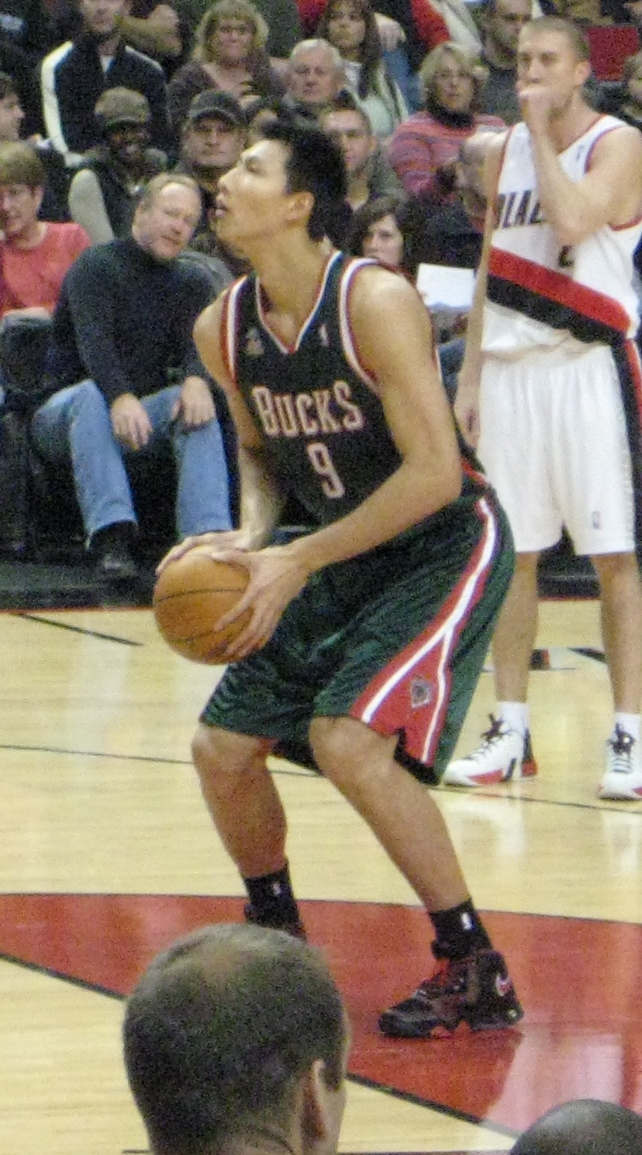
Yi attempting a free throw against the Portland Trail Blazers

Yi was named to Milwaukee's starting lineup by head coach Larry Krystkowiak in place of Charlie Villanueva to begin the 2007–08 season. He recorded nine points and three rebounds in a debut loss to the Orlando Magic. He played his first home game in Milwaukee three days later and scored 16 points while grabbing eight rebounds in a 78–72 win over the Chicago Bulls. The game was also Yi's first game to be televised nationally in China, where it was watched by an estimated 100 million viewers. Yao Ming praised Yi's play in his first few games, saying, "If you compare us in our third NBA games, you will see that Yi's statistics are far better than mine."

On November 9, 2007, Yi played against Yao Ming for the first time when the Houston Rockets hosted Milwaukee in a 104–88 loss. Yi recorded 19 points and nine rebounds, including two three-pointers, while Yao recorded 28 points and nine rebounds. The game between the two was watched by over 200 million people in China, making it one of the most-watched games in NBA history. After the game, Yao called Yi's talent "unbelievable" and Tracy McGrady said that Yi had a "tremendous upside in this league". Del Harris, the former head coach of the Chinese national basketball team, also described Yi as the "most athletic seven-footer in the NBA."

Yi was named the NBA Rookie of the Month for December 2007 after averaging 12.1 points and 6.6 rebounds per game that month, while scoring a career-high 29 points on 14-of-17 shooting in a win over the Charlotte Bobcats on December 22. On January 30, 2008, he was selected for the rookie team in the Rookie Challenge at the 2008 NBA All-Star Game. On February 2, 2008, Yi faced Yao for the second time when Milwaukee played at home against Houston, which Krystkowiak dubbed the "Chinese Super Bowl". However, both players struggled during Houston's 91–83 victory over Milwaukee. Yao scored 12 points while Yi injured his shoulder during the game, finishing with just six points.

On April 2, 2008, it was announced that Yi would miss the rest of the season with a knee injury. Having already missed eight games with other injuries, Yi managed 66 out of a possible 82 games in his rookie season, averaging 8.6 points and 5.2 rebounds per game. One of Milwaukee's assistant coaches, Brian James, later said that "the injuries he had bothered him more than people realized, and he couldn't play through them."

=== New Jersey Nets (2008–2010) ===
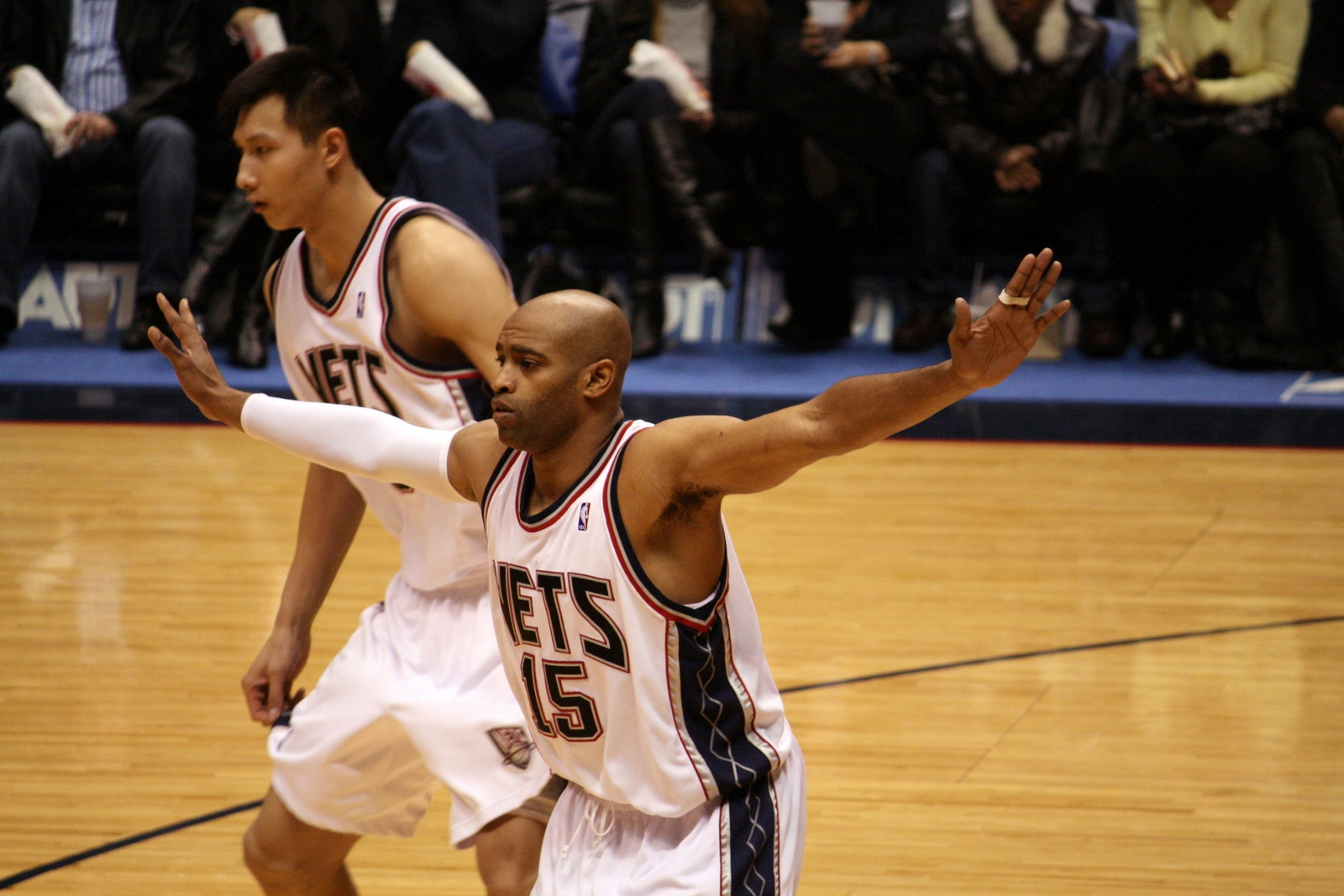
Yi (background) in 2010 with the Nets and then teammate Vince Carter

On June 26, 2008, Yi was traded by the Milwaukee Bucks along with Bobby Simmons to the New Jersey Nets in exchange for Richard Jefferson. New Jersey's team president Rod Thorn said that "we feel strongly he's going to be a real good player," and the team's chief executive Brett Yormark said "it opens up a truly new fan base for us." Yi stated that he didn't expect to be traded, but that it was "an honor to join the Nets."

Through his first 37 games with New Jersey, Yi averaged 10.5 points and 6.2 rebounds per game while shooting 39% from behind the three-point line, which was well above his average from the previous season. But on January 9, 2009, Yi broke the pinkie on his right hand and was expected to miss four to six weeks. Thorn called it "lousy timing" because "he'd been playing well," but Yi said "(I'll) just take my time. I'll come back." In voting for the 2009 NBA All-Star Game, Yi finished third in total votes for forwards in the Eastern Conference, ahead of players such as Paul Pierce and Chris Bosh.

Yi made his return from injury after the 2009 NBA All-Star Game in a loss to the Houston Rockets on February 17, 2009. However, after averaging only six points on 36% shooting after his return, Yi was removed from the team's starting lineup. His final averages for the season were 8.6 points and 5.3 rebounds per game, as well as a 38% shooting accuracy from the field and 34% on three-point field goals. After New Jersey finished the season outside of the playoffs, Yi's agent Dan Fegan suggested New Jersey played better when Yi played more minutes and took more shots, and asks "who's accountable?" New Jersey's head coach Lawrence Frank said that "you have to be patient. He's only 21", and Yi assessed his season by saying he was "still too much up and down."

In the 2009–10 season, Yi returned to the starting lineup for New Jersey. Starting in every game he played but one, Yi suffered several injuries during the season which made him miss 30 games. He sprained his medial collateral ligament on November 4, 2009, had a laceration on his upper lip on December 8, 2009, and sprained his left ankle on 8 March 2010. His final averages for the season were 12 points and 7.2 rebounds per game, as well as 40% shooting accuracy from the field and 37% on three-point field goals.

=== Washington Wizards (2010–2011) ===
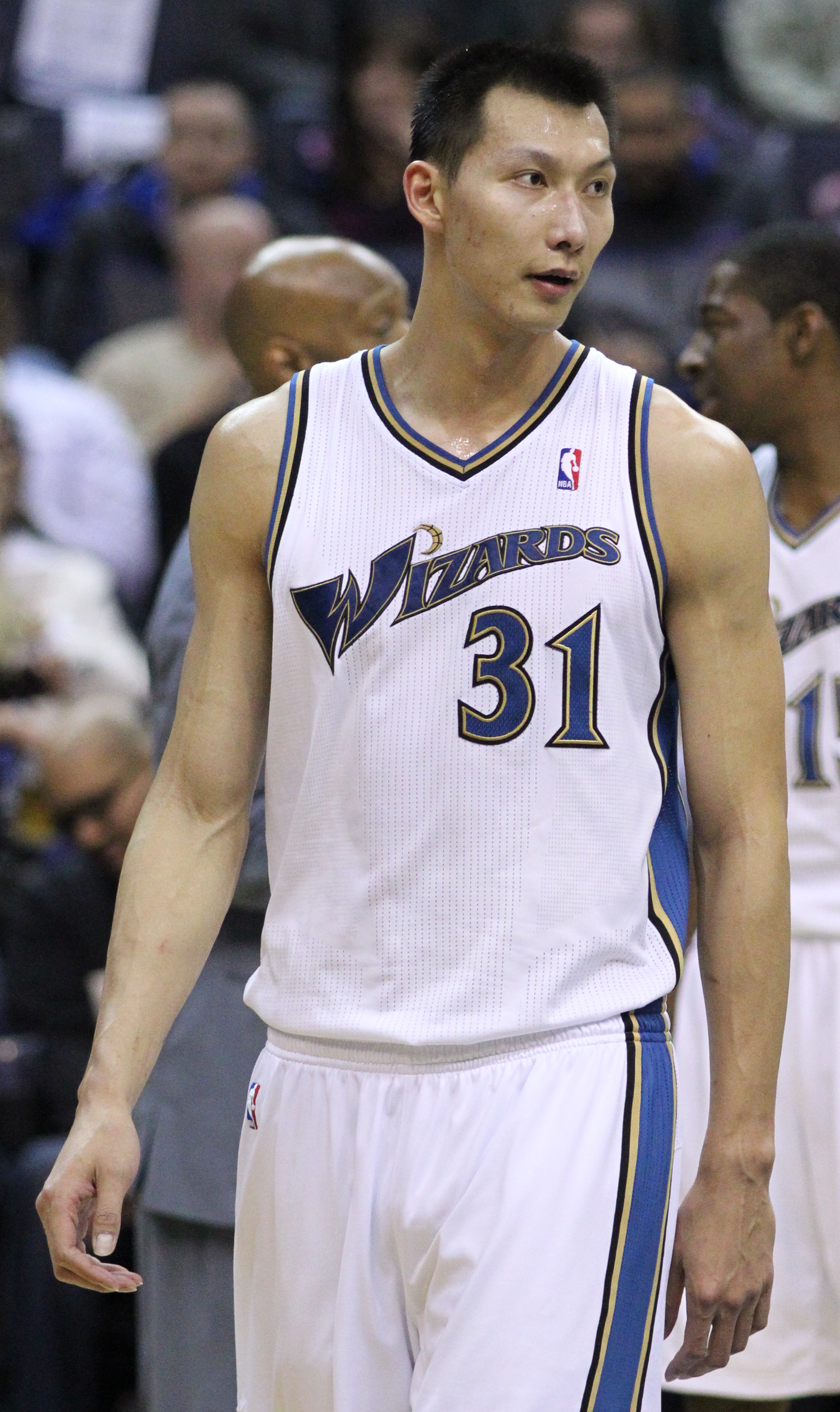
Yi with the Wizards in 2011

On June 29, 2010, Yi was traded to the Washington Wizards along with $3 million in cash considerations for Quinton Ross. Yi ended the 2010–11 season averaging 5.6 points and 3.9 rebounds per game. Washington had until June 30, 2011, to extend Yi's contract but decided not to do so.

=== Return to the Tigers (2011) ===
During the 2011 NBA lockout, Yi signed a one-year contract to return to the Guangdong Southern Tigers. Unlike most NBA players who went to the Chinese Basketball Association during that time, he received an option to return to the NBA once the lockout had been resolved.

=== Dallas Mavericks (2012) ===
On January 6, 2012, Yi signed with the Dallas Mavericks to a one-year contract after starting the season with the Guangdong Southern Tigers. He was immediately assigned to Dallas' D-League affiliate team, the Texas Legends. Yi benefited from the new collective bargaining agreement rules which allowed players with more than two years of NBA experience to be assigned to the D-League with the players' consent. On January 9, 2012, after playing two games for the Texas Legends, averaging 23 points and 12 rebounds per game, he was recalled by Dallas. The team faced the Oklahoma City Thunder in the playoffs and in game 3 of the playoff series, Yi played in his first NBA playoffs game, where he scored two points for the team in five minutes.

=== Third stint in Guangdong (2012–2023) ===
Yi re-joined the Guangdong Southern Tigers for the 2012–13 CBA season and went on to win a fourth championship that season.

On August 22, 2016, Yi signed a one-year, $8 million contract with the Los Angeles Lakers, returning to the NBA for the first time since 2012. Lakers head coach Luke Walton considered Yi to be the team's best-shooting big man during the preseason, but did not provide Yi with much of a role. Yi averaged 3.0 points and 2.5 rebounds in 10.7 minutes per game over six contests with the Lakers during the preseason. Feeling he would have better opportunities elsewhere, Yi requested a release from the Lakers prior to the start of the regular season. The Lakers waived him on October 24, 2016.

In October 2016, Yi returned to Guangdong after spending training camp with the Los Angeles Lakers.

On August 15, 2020, Yi helped the Guangdong Southern Tigers in winning their 10th CBA championship after a 123–115 win in game 3 of the CBA Finals over the Liaoning Flying Leopards, but Yi had suffered a ruptured Achilles tendon during the game and was expected to miss a major part of 2020–21 CBA season due to rehabilitation.

The 2022–23 CBA season was Yi's final basketball season where he made the decision to retire on August 30, 2023. He wrote on Sina Weibo: "Time flies; in the blink of an eye, basketball has been by my side for 21 years. After much contemplation, I have made the decision to officially bring my basketball career to a close. I will cherish the memories of the past while continuing to move forward, embracing new chapters in my life. Goodbye, my beloved basketball."

== National team career ==
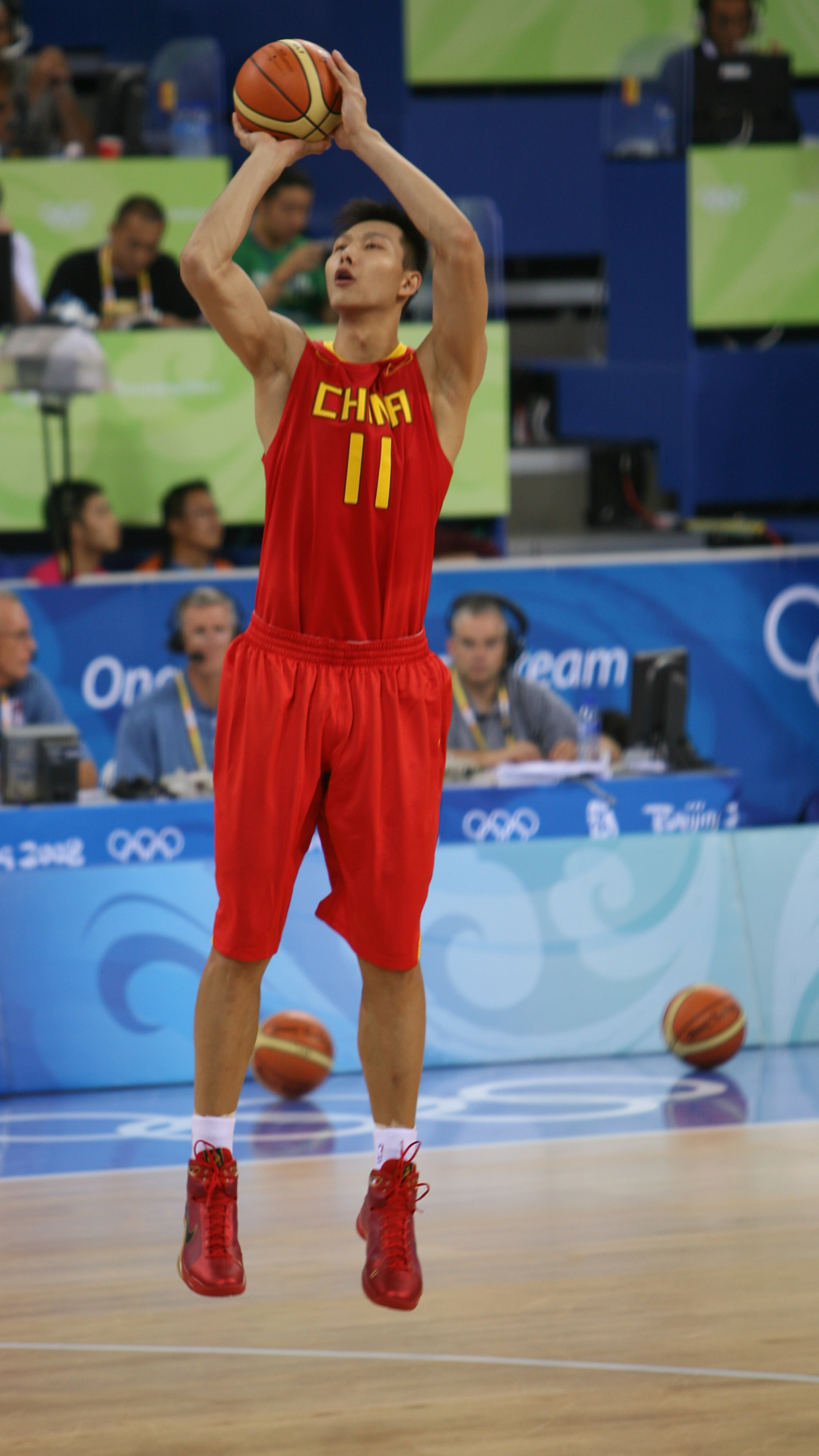
Yi with team China

Yi's first major international experience came at the 2003 FIBA Under-19 World Championship in which he averaged 18.9 points and 11.5 rebounds per game. He made his debut with the Chinese national basketball team during the 2004 Summer Olympics and averaged six points and six rebounds per game at the 2006 FIBA World Championship. His performance impressed coaches on the Chinese national team as well as the coaches from other countries.

In 2008, Yi was once again selected to play for the Chinese national team at the 2008 Summer Olympics. In China's first two group stage matches, Yi scored nine and four points, respectively, and China lost both their games against the United States and Spain. But in a win against Angola, Yi recorded a double-double, and in a win against Germany, Yi recorded 9 points and 11 rebounds, and hit the crucial shot with 28 seconds left to help China advance to the quarter-finals. However, Lithuania ended China's run by beating them 94–68, as Yi scored 11 points for his side.

Yi, along with former NBA player Sun Yue, was a member of the Chinese national team that played at the 2009 FIBA Asia Championship and the 2011 FIBA Asia Championship. Yi was named the most valuable player of the 2011 FIBA Asia Championship, averaging 16.6 points and 10.8 rebounds per game. Yi also played for the Chinese national team during the 2012 Summer Olympics, ranking first in rebounds per game with 10.2 per game and ranking second in blocks with 2.2 per game. He also played at the 2016 Summer Olympics. During 2019 FIBA Basketball World Cup. Yi was still the leader on the Chinese national team, averaging 17.8 points, 7.8 rebounds and 1.2 assists. In the match with Nigeria, he displayed the best performance for the national team in recent years. Yi got 27 points and a player efficiency of 26.

== Personal life ==
Yi is fluent in both Mandarin and his native tongue of Cantonese. He was ranked fourth on Forbes' China Celebrity 100 in income and popularity in 2008. In 2008, Yi donated 100,000 yuan to support the 2008 Sichuan earthquake victims and also participated in the 2008 Summer Olympics' torch relay by carrying the torch during the Hainan leg of the relay.

In October 2024, Yi became embroiled in a sex scandal involving the solicitation of a transgender woman, purportedly paying her US$1,500. A staff member from the Dongguan Municipal CPPCC confirmed they were aware of the scandal but could not verify its authenticity. Several brands that had previously collaborated with Yi swiftly removed promotional materials related to him, and Yi has not made any public response to the accusations.

== Career statistics ==
=== CBA ===
Year	Team	GP	RPG	APG	FG%	FT%	PPG
2002–03	Guangdong	36	3.3	0.2	.580	.600	5.0
2003–04	Guangdong	28	5.9	0.5	.517	.741	9.7
2004–05	Guangdong	53	10.2	1.4	.568	.717	16.8
2005–06	Guangdong	53	9.7	1.2	.574	.754	20.5
2006–07	Guangdong	39	11.5	1.1	.585	.816	24.9
2011–12	Guangdong	4	7.8	1.3	.439	.737	12.5
2012–13	Guangdong	38	10.5	1.4	.572	.718	24.2
2013–14	Guangdong	42	12.8	1.5	.535	.712	23.5
2014–15	Guangdong	45	10.9	1.3	.575	.735	27.7
2015–16	Guangdong	43	9.2	2.1	.549	.724	26.3
2016–17	Guangdong	28	10.4	1.1	.521	.727	24.2
2017–18	Guangdong	38	13.3	1.8	.491	.802	24.2
2018–19	Guangdong	38	9.3	0.9	.576	.780	21.4
2019–20	Guangdong	14	10.1	0.9	.537	.846	22.4
Career		499	9.9	1.2	.555	.739	21.0

=== NBA ===
Legend
GP	Games played	GS	Games started	MPG	Minutes per game
FG%	Field goal percentage	3P%	3-point field goal percentage	FT%	Free throw percentage
RPG	Rebounds per game	APG	Assists per game	SPG	Steals per game
BPG	Blocks per game	PPG	Points per game	**Bold**	Career high

==== Regular season ====
Year	Team	GP	GS	MPG	FG%	3P%	FT%	RPG	APG	SPG	BPG	PPG
2007–08	Milwaukee	**66**	49	25.0	**.421**	.286	**.841**	5.2	.8	.5	.8	8.6
2008–09	New Jersey	61	**52**	23.3	.382	.343	.772	5.3	**1.0**	.5	.6	8.6
2009–10	New Jersey	52	51	**31.8**	.403	**.366**	.798	**7.2**	.9	**.7**	**1.0**	**12.0**
2010–11	Washington	63	11	17.7	.418	.231	.681	3.9	.4	.4	.5	5.6
2011–12	Dallas	30	0	6.8	.378	.300	.667	1.6	.2	.2	.3	2.6
Career		272	163	22.2	.404	.333	.780	4.9	0.7	0.5	0.7	7.9

==== Playoffs ====
Year	Team	GP	GS	MPG	FG%	3P%	FT%	RPG	APG	SPG	BPG	PPG
2012	Dallas	1	0	5.0	.333	.000	.000	2.0	.0	1.0	.0	2.0
Career		1	0	5.0	.333	.000	.000	2.0	.0	1.0	.0	2.0

Olympic Games
Preceded by Yao Ming	Flagbearer for China; London 2012	Succeeded by Lei Sheng
