= 2005–06 Chinese Basketball Association season =

2005–06 CBA season
- League: Chinese Basketball Association
- Sport: Basketball
- Duration: November 20, 2005 – April 19, 2006
- TV partner(s): CCTV-5; Dragon TV; STAR Sports and local channels

Regular Season
- Season champions: Guangdong Southern Tigers
- Season MVP: (China) ~~Mengke Bateer~~ (Vacated due to league punishment.)

Playoffs

Finals
- Champions: Guangdong Southern Tigers
- Runners-up: Bayi Rockets
- Finals MVP: (China) Yi Jianlian

CBA seasons
- ← 2004–05 2006–07 →

The 2005–06 CBA season is the 11th CBA season.

The season ran from November 20, 2005 to April 19, 2006. Dongguan Leopards joined CBA in this season and was divided into the South Division. The name of the league in Chinese is no longer the "Jia A" league (男子篮球甲A联赛) but the "professional league" (中国男子篮球职业联赛).

In the Regular Season, the eight South Division teams played 42 games each and the seven North Division teams played 40 games each. The Divisional Championships established in the previous season were abolished.

The all-star game was played on March 18, 2006 in Shanghai, after the end of the regular season and before the beginning of the playoffs: the South Division defeated the North Division 93-90. Also, all-star games were played against the KBL, on January 22, 2006 in Korea and January 24, 2006 in Jiyuan, Henan, China. Korea won the first game 96-86; China won the second game 104-85.

== Foreign Players ==
=== Draft ===
The draft for foreign players was held in Eugene, United States.

PG	Point guard	SG	Shooting guard	SF	Small forward	PF	Power forward	C	Center

Rnd.	Pick	Player	Pos.	Nationality (Note: Nationality indicates the player's national team or representative nationality. If a player has not competed at the international level, then the nationality indicates the national team which the player is eligible to represent according to FIBA rules.)	Team
1	1	Anthony Myles	F	USA	Dongguan Leopards
1	2	Tyrone Washington	C	USA	Fujian Sturgeons
1	3	Soumaila Samake	C	MLI	Zhejiang Cyclones
1	4	Eddy Fobbs	C	USA	Shandong Lions
1	5	Jackson Williams	G	USA	Henan Dragons
1	6	Brandon Crump	C	USA	Shaanxi Kylins
1	7	Reggie Okosa	F	NGR	Shanghai Sharks
1	8	Roderick Gregoire	G	USA	Jilin Northeast Tigers
1	9	Lorenzo Coleman	C	USA	Xinjiang Flying Tigers
1	10	Nate Williams	C	USA	Beijing Ducks
1	11	Reggie Butler	C	USA	Liaoning Hunters
1	12	Jon Smith	F	USA	Yunnan Bulls
1	13	Ryan Forehan-Kelly	G	USA	Jiangsu Dragons
1	14	Jason Dixon	C	USA	Guangdong Southern Tigers
2	1	Charles Mason	F	USA	Dongguan Leopards
2	2	Chris Porter	F	USA	Fujian Sturgeons
2	3	Curtis Millage	G	USA	Zhejiang Cyclones
2	4	Joel Johnes Camacho	G	PUR	Shandong Lions
2	5	Kit Rhymer	C	USA	Henan Dragons
2	6	Trey Moore	G	USA	Shaanxi Kylins
2	7	Rob Little	C	USA	Shanghai Sharks
2	8	Babacar Camara	C	SEN	Jilin Northeast Tigers
2	9	Randell Jackson	F	USA	Xinjiang Flying Tigers
2	10	Nate Burton	F	USA	Beijing Ducks
2	11	Ernest Brown	C	USA	Liaoning Hunters
2	12	B. B.Waldon	F	USA	Yunnan Bulls
2	13	Jason Klotz	C	USA	Jiangsu Dragons
2	14	Terrance Green	G	USA	Guangdong Southern Tigers
3	1	John Millsap	F	USA	Dongguan Leopards
3	2	Ejelu Okafor	C	USA	Fujian Sturgeons
3	3	Eric Washington	G	USA	Zhejiang Cyclones
3	4	Leroy Hickerson	F	USA	Shandong Lions
3	5	Corey Williams	G	USA	Henan Dragons
3	6	Antonio Hudson	G	USA	Shaanxi Kylins
3	7	Mack Tuck	F	USA	Shanghai Sharks
3	8	Matt Vaughn	G	USA	Jilin Northeast Tigers
3	9	Pat Simpson	C	USA	Xinjiang Flying Tigers
3	10	Nate Lofton	C	USA	Beijing Ducks
3	11	Antoine Hyman	F	USA	Liaoning Hunters
3	12	Jerod Ward	F	USA	Yunnan Bulls
3	13	Carlos Dixon	G	USA	Jiangsu Dragons
3	14	Billy Knight	F	USA	Guangdong Southern Tigers
4	1	Geoff Brown	C	USA	Dongguan Leopards
4	2	Seamus Boxley	F	USA	Fujian Sturgeons
4	3	Andre Joseph	G	USA	Zhejiang Cyclones
4	4	Zoran Viskovic	C	CRO	Shandong Lions
4	5	Darrall Johns	C	USA	Henan Dragons
4	6	Mike Mathews	F	USA	Shaanxi Kylins
4	7	Mustapha Hoff	F	USA	Shanghai Sharks
4	8	Cameron Koford	C	USA	Jilin Northeast Tigers
4	9	Wayland White	F	USA	Xinjiang Flying Tigers
4	10	Austin Nichols	G	USA	Beijing Ducks
4	11	Devonne Giles	F	USA	Liaoning Hunters
4	12	Leon Trimmingha	F	PUR	Yunnan Bulls
4	13	Anderson Ferreira	F	BRA	Jiangsu Dragons
4	14	Kei Madison	F	USA	Guangdong Southern Tigers

== Regular season standings ==
#	2005–06 CBA season									
#	North Division					South Division				
#	Team	W	L	PCT	GB	Team	W	L	PCT	GB
1	Beijing Ducks	30	10	.750	–	Guangdong Southern Tigers	37	5	.881	–
2	Xinjiang Flying Tigers	27	13	.675	3	Bayi Rockets	28	14	.667	9
3	Liaoning Hunters	21	19	.525	9	Jiangsu Dragons	27	15	.643	10
4	Jilin Northeast Tigers	17	23	.425	13	Yunnan Bulls	21	21	.500	16
5	Shandong Lions	12	28	.300	18	Shanghai Sharks	20	22	.476	17
6	Shaanxi Kylins	11	29	.275	19	Fujian Xunxing	20	22	.476	17
7	Henan Dragons	9	31	.225	21	Zhejiang Cyclones	17	25	.405	20
8						Dongguan Leopards	11	31	.262	26

Key to colors
Top 4 teams of each division advance to the Playoffs

== Playoffs ==
The quarter-finals were once again expanded to best-of-five series, and the finals were expanded to best-of-seven series for the very first time.

In the Final series, Guangdong Southern Tigers defeated Bayi Rockets (4-1), claimed its 3rd straight CBA championship.

Teams in bold advanced to the next round. The numbers to the left of each team indicate the team's seeding in regular season, and the numbers to the right indicate the number of games the team won in that round. Home court advantage belongs to the team with the better regular season record; teams enjoying the home advantage are shown in italics.

Quarterfinals; Best of 5
S1	**Guangdong Southern Tigers**	**3**
N4	Jilin Northeast Tigers	0
N2	Xinjiang Flying Tigers	0
S3	**Jiangsu Dragons**	**3**
N1	**Beijing Ducks**	**3**
S4	Yunnan Bulls	0
S2	**Bayi Rockets**	**3**
N3	Liaoning Hunters	1

Semifinals; Best of 5
S1	**Guangdong Southern Tigers**	**3**
S3	Jiangsu Dragons	0
N1	Beijing Ducks	0
S2	**Bayi Rockets**	**3**

Finals; Best of 7
S1	**Guangdong Southern Tigers**	**4**
S2	Bayi Rockets	1

== See also ==
- Chinese Basketball Association
