= 2003–04 Chinese Basketball Association season =

2003–04 CBA season
- League: Chinese Basketball Association
- Sport: Basketball
- Duration: November 16, 2003 – March 3, 2004
- TV partner(s): CCTV-5 and local channels

Regular Season
- Season champions: Guangdong Southern Tigers
- Season MVP: (China) Tang Zhengdong

Playoffs

Finals
- Champions: Guangdong Southern Tigers
- Runners-up: Bayi Rockets
- Finals MVP: (China) Du Feng

CBA seasons
- ← 2002–03 2004–05 →

The 2003–04 CBA season is the ninth CBA season.

The season ran from November 16, 2003, to March 3, 2004. No teams were promoted from the Second Division, while two teams were set to be relegated. However, relegations were abolished after all Relegation Round matches have been played.

== Regular Season Standings ==
#	2003–04 CBA season							
#	Team	W	L	PCT	GB	Home	Road	Tiebreaker
1	Guangdong Southern Tigers	19	3	.864	-	11–0	8–3	
2	Jiangsu Dragons	15	7	.682	4	11–0	4–7	
3	Bayi Rockets	14	8	.636	5	8–3	6–5	
4	Jilin Northeast Tigers	13	9	.591	6	8–3	5–6	
5	Xinjiang Flying Tigers	12	10	.545	7	9–2	3–8	
6	Shandong Lions	10	12	.455	9	8–3	2–9	SD 2-0 BO
7	Beijing Olympians	10	12	.455	9	5–6	5–6	SD 2-0 BO
8	Shaanxi Kylins	9	13	.409	10	6–5	3–8	SX 1-1(190-190) LN; Shaanxi has advantage on Goal Average
9	Liaoning Hunters	9	13	.409	10	5–6	4–7	SX 1-1(190-190) LN; Shaanxi has advantage on Goal Average
10	Shanghai Sharks	8	14	.364	11	4–7	4–7	
11	Beijing Ducks	7	15	.318	12	5–6	2–9	
12	Zhejiang Cyclones	6	16	.273	10	4–7	2–9	

Key to colors
Top 8 teams advance to the Playoffs
Bottom 4 teams advance to the Relegation Round

== Playoffs ==
The top 8 teams in the regular season advanced to the playoffs. The quarterfinals and semifinals once again used best-of-three series to determine the advancing team.

In the Final series, Guangdong Southern Tigers defeated Bayi Rockets (3-1).

Teams in bold advanced to the next round. The numbers to the left of each team indicate the team's seeding in regular season, and the numbers to the right indicate the number of games the team won in that round. Home court advantage belongs to the team with the better regular season record; teams enjoying the home advantage are shown in italics.

Quarterfinals; Best of 3
1	**Guangdong Southern Tigers**	**2**
8	Shaanxi Kylins	0
4	**Jilin Northeast Tigers**	**2**
5	Xinjiang Flying Tigers	1
2	**Jiangsu Dragons**	**2**
7	Beijing Olympians	0
3	**Bayi Rockets**	**2**
6	Shandong Lions	0

Semifinals; Best of 3
1	**Guangdong Southern Tigers**	**2**
4	Jilin Northeast Tigers	1
2	Jiangsu Dragons	0
3	**Bayi Rockets**	**2**

Finals; Best of 5
1	**Guangdong Southern Tigers**	**3**
3	Bayi Rockets	1

== Relegations ==
The bottom 4 teams participated in the Relegation Round. Each team played 4 games against each of the other three teams, for a total of 12 games.

2 teams were set to be relegated. However, relegations were abolished after all Relegation Round matches have been played.

Team	W	L
Shanghai Sharks	7	5
Beijing Ducks	7	5
Zhejiang Cyclones	6	6
Liaoning Hunters	4	8

== See also ==
- Chinese Basketball Association
