= 2004–05 Chinese Basketball Association season =

2004–05 CBA season
- League: Chinese Basketball Association
- Sport: Basketball
- Duration: November 14, 2004 – April 14, 2005
- TV partner(s): CCTV-5 and local channels

Regular Season
- Season champions: Jiangsu Dragons
- Season MVP: (China) Tang Zhengdong

Playoffs

Finals
- Champions: Guangdong Southern Tigers
- Runners-up: Jiangsu Dragons
- Finals MVP: (China) Zhu Fangyu

CBA seasons
- ← 2003–04 2005–06 →

The 2004–05 CBA season is the tenth CBA season, which ran from November 14, 2004 to April 14, 2005. Beijing Olympians was disqualified for this season.

Promotion and relegation were both abolished since the end of the previous season, and the Second Division was renamed NBL. Top finishing teams from the NBL may choose to join the CBA as long as a team meets all items of the criteria set by the CBA Board. As a result, Yunnan Bulls, Fujian Xunxing and Henan Dragons joined the league in this season.

For this season, the league was divided into a North Division (北区) and a South Division (南区), and a new playoff system was also introduced. The regular season consisted of 266 matches, with each team playing 38 matches (four against each of six other teams within its division and two against each of seven teams in the other division).

The all-star game was played on March 6, 2005 in Nanjing, after the end of the regular season and before the beginning of the playoffs: the North Division defeated the South Division 103-99, and Mengke Bateer was the MVP. Also, all-star games were played against the KBL, on January 28, 2005 in Korea and January 30, 2005 in Harbin, China. Korea won the first game 85-82; China won the second game 93-77.

== Regular season standings ==
#	2004–05 CBA season									
#	North Division					South Division				
#	Team	W	L	PCT	GB	Team	W	L	PCT	GB
1	Liaoning Hunters	29	9	.763	–	Jiangsu Dragons	35	3	.921	–
2	Beijing Ducks	22	16	.579	7	Guangdong Southern Tigers	30	8	.789	5
3	Xinjiang Flying Tigers	20	18	.526	9	Bayi Rockets	24	14	.632	11
4	Jilin Northeast Tigers	19	19	.500	10	Yunnan Bulls	22	16	.579	13
5	Shaanxi Kylins	12	26	.316	17	Shanghai Sharks	12	26	.316	23
6	Shandong Lions	11	27	.289	18	Zhejiang Cyclones	11	27	.289	24
7	Henan Dragons	11	27	.289	18	Fujian Xunxing	8	30	.211	27

Key to colors
Top 4 teams of each division advance to the Divisional Championships and the Playoffs

== Divisional Championships ==
In the Divisional Championships (分区冠军赛), top 4 teams played with others from the same division in a knock-out bracket.

Winners became the Divisional Champions. No teams were eliminated, the result of the Divisional Championships were used to re-seed teams in the Playoffs.

North Division Semifinals; Best of 3
N1	Liaoning Hunters	2
N4	Jilin Northeast Tigers	1
N2	Beijing Ducks	2
N3	Xinjiang Flying Tigers	1

North Division Finals; Best of 3
N1	Liaoning Hunters (N1)	2
N2	Beijing Ducks (N2)	0
North Division Third Place Best of 3
N4	Jilin Northeast Tigers (N4)	1
N3	Xinjiang Flying Tigers (N3)	2

South Division Semifinals; Best of 3
S1	Jiangsu Dragons	2
S4	Yunnan Bulls	0
S2	Guangdong Southern Tigers	2
S3	Bayi Rockets	1

South Division Finals; Best of 3
S1	Jiangsu Dragons (S2)	0
S2	Guangdong Southern Tigers (S1)	2
South Division Third Place Best of 3
S4	Yunnan Bulls (S4)	0
S3	Bayi Rockets (S3)	2

As it turned out, the only change of seeding was that Jiangsu and Guangdong switched places (S1 and S2).

== Playoffs ==
In the Final series, Guangdong Southern Tigers defeated Jiangsu Dragons (3-2). Bayi failed to make the finals for the first time ever.

Teams in bold advanced to the next round. The numbers to the left of each team indicate the team's seeding in Divisional Championships, and the numbers to the right indicate the number of games the team won in that round. Home court advantage belongs to the team with the better regular season record; teams enjoying the home advantage are shown in italics.

Quarterfinals; Best of 3
S1	**Guangdong Southern Tigers**	**2**
N4	Jilin Northeast Tigers	0
N2	Beijing Ducks	1
S3	**Bayi Rockets**	**2**
N1	Liaoning Hunters	1
S4	**Yunnan Bulls**	**2**
S2	**Jiangsu Dragons**	**2**
N3	Xinjiang Flying Tigers	0

Semifinals; Best of 5
S1	**Guangdong Southern Tigers**	**3**
S3	Bayi Rockets	0
S4	Yunnan Bulls	0
S2	**Jiangsu Dragons**	**3**

Finals; Best of 5
S1	**Guangdong Southern Tigers**	**3**
S2	Jiangsu Dragons	2

== See also ==
- Chinese Basketball Association
