= 2002–03 Chinese Basketball Association season =

2002–03 CBA season
- League: Chinese Basketball Association
- Sport: Basketball
- Duration: December 7, 2002 – April 23, 2003
- TV partner(s): CCTV-5 and local channels

Regular Season
- Season champions: Guangdong Southern Tigers
- Season MVP: (China) Sun Jun
- Promoted to Second Division: Beijing Olympians; Xinjiang Flying Tigers
- Relegated to Second Division: Sina Lions; Hong Kong Flying Dragons

Playoffs

Finals
- Champions: Bayi Rockets
- Runners-up: Guangdong Southern Tigers
- Finals MVP: (China) Liu Yudong

CBA seasons
- ← 2001–02 2003–04 →

The 2002–03 CBA season is the eighth CBA season.

The season ran from December 7, 2002 to April 23, 2003. Beijing Olympians and Xinjiang Flying Tigers were promoted from the Second Division. Hong Kong club Flying Dragons joined CBA in this season.

== Regular season standings ==
#	2002–03 CBA season							
#	Team	W	L	PCT	GB	Home	Road	Tiebreaker
1	Guangdong Southern Tigers	23	3	.885	-	12–1	11–2	GD 2-0 BY
2	Bayi Rockets	23	3	.885	-	12–1	11–2	GD 2-0 BY
3	Jilin Northeast Tigers	17	9	.654	6	11–2	6–7	
4	Xinjiang Flying Tigers	15	11	.577	8	10–3	5–8	XJ 1-1(202-190) SD
5	Shandong Flaming Bulls	15	11	.577	8	11–2	4–9	XJ 1-1(202-190) SD
6	Zhejiang Cyclones	14	12	.538	9	9–4	5–8	ZJ 2-0 BO
7	Beijing Olympians	14	12	.538	9	8–5	6–7	ZJ 2-0 BO
8	Beijing Ducks	12	14	.462	11	8–5	4–9	BJ 1-1(235-226) JS
9	Jiangsu Dragons	12	14	.462	11	10–3	2–11	BJ 1-1(235-226) JS
10	Shanghai Sharks	11	15	.423	12	8–5	3–10	
11	Liaoning Hunters	10	16	.385	13	7–6	3–10	
12	Shaanxi Kylins	8	18	.308	15	7–6	1–12	
13	Sina Lions	7	19	.269	16	5–8	2–11	
14	Hong Kong Flying Dragons (Note: Hong Kong Flying Dragons was facing financial difficulties after the Regular Season. The team couldn't afford to play the Relegation Round, and was relegated directly.)	1	25	.040	22	1–12	0–13	

Key to colors
Top 8 teams advance to the Playoffs
Bottom 2 teams advance to the Relegation Round
Relegated Directly

== Playoffs ==
The top 8 teams in the regular season advanced to the playoffs.

In the Final series, Bayi Rockets defeated Guangdong Southern Tigers (3-1).

Teams in bold advanced to the next round. The numbers to the left of each team indicate the team's seeding in regular season, and the numbers to the right indicate the number of games the team won in that round. Home court advantage belongs to the team with the better regular season record; teams enjoying the home advantage are shown in italics.

Quarterfinals; Best of 5
1	**Guangdong Southern Tigers**	**3**
5	Shandong Flaming Bulls	0
4	Xinjiang Flying Tigers	1
8	**Beijing Ducks**	**3**
2	**Bayi Rockets**	**3**
6	Zhejiang Cyclones	0
3	**Jilin Northeast Tigers**	**3**
7	Beijing Olympians	2

Semifinals; Best of 5
1	**Guangdong Southern Tigers**	**3**
8	Beijing Ducks	0
2	**Bayi Rockets**	**3**
3	Jilin Northeast Tigers	0

Finals; Best of 5
1	Guangdong Southern Tigers	1
2	**Bayi Rockets**	**3**
Third place Best of 3
3	**Jilin Northeast Tigers**	**2**
8	Beijing Ducks	0

== Relegations ==
2 teams played the relegation round by a best-of-five series.

Sina Lions, with Hong Kong Flying Dragons, was relegated to the Second Division. As a matter of fact, Hong Kong Flying Dragons dissolved after this season, while Sina Lions dropped out of the league and went back to Taiwan.

Relegation Round; Best of 5
Shaanxi Kylins	3
Sina Lions	0

== See also ==
- Chinese Basketball Association
