= Mengke Bateer =

Chinese basketball player of Mongol descent (born 1975)

Mengke Bateer Mönkhbaatar

President of the Inner Mongolia Basketball Association
- Incumbent
- Assumed office 28 October 2018
- CBA President: Yao Ming; Guo Zhenming

Personal details
- Born: November 20, 1975 (age 50) Hanggin Banner, Inner Mongolia, China
- Party: Independent
- Occupation: Basketball player
- Awards: Chinese Basketball Hall of Fame (2026)
- Basketball career

Personal information
- Listed height: 6 ft 11 in (2.11 m)
- Listed weight: 308 lb (140 kg)

Career information
- NBA draft: 1997: undrafted
- Playing career: 1997–2014
- Position: Center
- Number: 9, 27, 34, 14, 42

Career history
- 1997–2002: Beijing Ducks
- 2002: Denver Nuggets
- 2002–2003: San Antonio Spurs
- 2003–2004: Toronto Raptors
- 2004–2005: Huntsville Flight
- 2005–2006: Beijing Ducks
- 2007–2013: Xinjiang Flying Tigers
- 2013: Sichuan Blue Whales
- 2013–2014: Beijing Ducks
- 2014: Shaanxi Xinda Wolves

Career highlights
- NBA champion (2003); CBA champion (2014); 4× CBA Most Valuable Player (2006 - later vacated, 2009–2011); 2× CBA All-Star Game MVP (2002, 2005); No. 9 retired by the Beijing Ducks
- Stats at NBA.com
- Stats at Basketball Reference
Medals
Men's basketball
Representing China
FIBA Asia Cup
Gold medal – first place	1993 Jakarta
Gold medal – first place	1999 Fukuoka
Gold medal – first place	2001 Shanghai
Gold medal – first place	2003 Harbin
Asian Games
Gold medal – first place	1998 Bangkok
Silver medal – second place	2002 Busan
Summer Universiade
Silver medal – second place	2001 Beijing
East Asian Games
Silver medal – second place	1997 Busan
Gold medal – first place	2001 Osaka
ABC Under-18 Championship
Gold medal – first place	1992 Beijing
ABC Under-22 Championship
Silver medal – second place	1996 Shanghai

Mengke Bateer

Chinese name
- Traditional Chinese: 孟克巴特爾
- Simplified Chinese: 孟克巴特尔
Transcriptions
Standard Mandarin
- Hanyu Pinyin: Mèngkè Bātè'ěr
- Wade–Giles: Meng^{4}-k'o^{4} Pa^{1}-t'e^{4}-erh^{3}
- IPA: [mə̂ŋkʰɤ̂ pátʰɤ̂àɚ]
Yue: Cantonese
- Yale Romanization: Meng4 ke4 Ba1 te4 er3
- Jyutping: Maang6 hak1 Baa1 dak6 ji5

Mongolian name
- Mongolian Cyrillic: Мөнхбаатар
- Mongolian script: ᠮᠥᠩᠬᠡᠪᠠᠭᠠᠲᠤᠷ
Transcriptions
- SASM/GNC: Monk Batere

Mönkhbaatar, commonly known by his Hanyu Pinyin name Mengke Bateer (simplified Chinese: 孟克巴特尔; traditional Chinese: 孟克巴特爾; pinyin: Mèngkè Bātè'ěr, pronounced [mə̂ŋkʰɤ̂ pátʰɤ̂àɚ]; born November 20, 1975), is a former Chinese professional basketball player of Mongolian descent who currently serves as the chairman of his native Inner Mongolia's basketball association.

As a center, Bateer spent the majority of his career competing in the Chinese Basketball Association for the Beijing Ducks and Xinjiang Flying Tigers before ending his career with the Shaanxi Xinda Wolves in the lesser National Basketball League. His most notable feat internationally is becoming an NBA champion with the San Antonio Spurs in 2003 as one of two Chinese to ever achieve this feat, the other being Sun Yue who won the 2009 NBA Finals with the Los Angeles Lakers.

== Background ==
Like most Mongols, Bateer does not have a surname and only goes by the name Mönkhbaatar (lit. 'Eternal Hero'). Chinese fans also sometimes refer to him affectionately as "Da Ba" (大巴), with Da meaning "big" and Ba representing the first character of his name in Mandarin.

At 210 cm and 132 kg, Bateer was a strong center, widely respected for his play as a screen-setter and passer. While his effectiveness was often limited by a lack of speed, he recorded six assists against the Chicago Bulls on March 30, 2002.

As of his official retirement in 2015, Bateer holds three notable distinctions: he was the only Chinese player to have played in the NBA without being selected in any NBA draft until Cui Yongxi signed with the Brooklyn Nets in 2024; he was the first player of Asian descent to win an NBA championship; and he was the first Chinese player to have been on a title-winning roster, taking part in the San Antonio Spurs' triumphant 2003 season. His compatriot Sun Yue also accomplished this achievement as a member of the Los Angeles Lakers when they won the NBA championship in 2009. Coincidentally, Bateer and Sun would win the 2014 CBA championship for the Beijing Ducks together, making them the first, and so far only, Chinese players to win both the NBA and CBA finals; a feat matched only by American player Eric Moreland in 2022.

Bateer was also the first-ever Chinese player to start an NBA game when he joined the Denver Nuggets in 2002. Yao Ming would become the second Chinese player to do so later in that year and Wang Zhizhi, despite being the first-ever Chinese player to join the league, did not start in a game until years later.

== Early basketball career ==
Brought up through the youth ranks by the Beijing Ducks, Mengke Bateer made his debut for China's national basketball team prior to the 1994 Asian Games, at the age of 18. Three years later, although a regular member of the playing rotation, he was removed from the national squad due to "disciplinary problems" as reported in the media. Often presented to the public as a filial son, Bateer would attempt several times over the course of his career to leave his teams, and return to his family.

While training with China's national team in 1999, Bateer was invited to play in a pre-draft tournament held in Phoenix, where he suffered from jet lag and did not impress the scouts in attendance. He also made a brief appearance at another pre-draft venue, in Treviso, Italy. But he would have to wait several more years to play in the NBA, staying with the Ducks from the 1997–98 CBA season through the 2001–02 season, and earning MVP honors at the 2002 CBA All-Star Game.

== NBA career ==
=== Denver Nuggets (2002) ===
In October 2001, Bateer joined the Denver Nuggets for the team's preseason training camp. He was dropped after two preseason games, but in March 2002, already deep into the 2001–02 NBA season, he rejoined the team, as the Nuggets were in desperate need of a player with big stature after trading Raef LaFrentz. This made him the second Chinese player to compete in the NBA after Wang Zhizhi, who had made his debut for the Dallas Mavericks a year earlier. He was also the first undrafted Chinese player in NBA history.

Bateer played in Denver's final 25 games of the season, averaging 5.5 points while battling fouls from opponents. Due to the shortage of the players with big stature in the Nuggets roster, he also ended up in the starting 10 of those contests, becoming the first Chinese player to ever start an NBA game, as Wang never made it into the starting line-up during his time with the Mavericks.

=== San Antonio Spurs (2002–2003) ===
In summer 2002, Bateer was traded to the Detroit Pistons, along with Don Reid, for Rodney White and a future first-round pick. But after an impressive show against Team USA at the 2002 FIBA World Championship in Indianapolis, where he scored 19 points (also leading China in scoring in five of seven games during the tournament) for a squad that also included the just-drafted Yao Ming, Team USA assistant coach Gregg Popovich, who was also the head coach of the San Antonio Spurs, decided to take a chance on Bateer and acquired him in exchange for a second-round pick.

Despite playing only occasionally with the Spurs, Bateer was nonetheless a member of San Antonio's 2002–03 championship team.

=== Toronto Raptors (2003–2004) ===
The following season, Bateer signed as a free agent with the Toronto Raptors, but was transferred later in the 2003–04 NBA season to the Orlando Magic, who waived him three days later. In October 2004, the New York Knicks signed Bateer as a training camp invitee, but waived him prior to the start of the 2004–05 NBA season. After being waived by the Knicks, Bateer played for the Huntsville Flight of the National Basketball Development League, now known as the NBA G League, for a while, before deciding to return to China.

=== NBA career statistics ===
Season	Team	GP	GS	MIN	FG%	3P%	FT%	OFF	DEF	REB	AST	STL	BLK	TOV	PF	PTS
2001–02	Denver	27	10	15.1	.402	.333	.784	1.2	2.4	3.6	0.8	0.4	0.2	1.2	3.5	5.1
2002–03	San Antonio	12	0	3.8	.235	.333	.000	0.2	0.7	0.8	0.3	0.0	0.0	0.5	1.2	0.8
2003–04	Toronto	7	0	5.7	.571	–	–	0.7	0.4	1.1	0.1	0.1	0.0	0.3	1.4	1.1
Career		46	10	10.7	.391	.333	.744	0.8	1.6	2.5	0.6	0.2	0.1	0.9	2.6	3.4

== Return to China ==
Mengke Bateer rejoined the Beijing Ducks in the Chinese Basketball Association in mid-February 2005, a couple of weeks before the end of the 2004–05 CBA season, and was named MVP of the 2005 CBA All-Star Game, which was held in Nanjing on March 7, after the regular season concluded. He scored a contest-best 28 points while leading the North to a 103–99 victory over the South.

During the 2005–06 CBA season, Bateer helped Beijing win a then-franchise-best CBA North Division title, while averaging 25 points, 11 rebounds, and 5 assists per game. He was originally chosen to be named the league's Regular Season MVP, but he had the honor vacated due to a rule forbidding players who were slapped with suspensions from receiving any awards (earlier in the season, he incurred the heaviest fine in CBA history for arguing with a referee, and sat out two games as a result).

Bateer then missed the 2006–07 CBA season due to injuries, and subsequently moved from the Ducks to the Xinjiang Flying Tigers, where he spent the next six years of his career. During his time in Xinjiang, he became the first player to ever "three-peat" as CBA Most Valuable Player, winning the honor in 2009, 2010, and 2011. The Flying Tigers also advanced to the CBA Finals in each of those years, but failed to win the title, falling to the Guangdong Southern Tigers on all three occasions.

After a brief stint with the Sichuan Blue Whales in China's lower-tier NBL in summer 2013, just as the team was preparing join the CBA, Bateer returned to the Beijing Ducks for the 2013–14 CBA season. More of a role player by that point in his career, he nonetheless provided an occasionally useful presence in the front court for Beijing, and helped the Ducks win their second CBA title.

== National team career ==
Mengke Bateer competed for China in the Summer Olympic Games at Atlanta 1996, Sydney 2000, and Athens 2004. He represented the PRC at the 2002 FIBA World Championship in Indianapolis. In addition to being a member of his country's national team for a number of FIBA Asia Championship, Asian Games, and East Asian Games competitions, he also competed for the PRC at the 2001 Summer Universiade in Beijing. The trio of 7' 6" Yao Ming, 7' 1" Wang Zhizhi, and 6' 11" Bateer were known by some fans and commentators as the "Walking Great Wall".

== Retirement ==
Bateer played briefly with NBL team Shaanxi Weinan Xingda in the summer of 2014, but did not compete during the 2014–15 CBA season. Some reports in the Chinese media stated that he was struggling with complications from the onset of diabetes. On August 11, 2015, he was honored with an official retirement ceremony held at the Beijing Wukesong Culture & Sports Center. The event was attended by former national team squadmates Wang Zhizhi, Du Feng, Wang Shipeng, and Zhu Fangyu, as well as NBA legend Hakeem Olajuwon. Yao Ming sent a videotaped farewell message and the evening climaxed with Bateer's number 9 jersey being lifted to the arena's rafters.

== Filmography ==
Year	English title	Chinese title	Role	Notes
2005	The Blue Xanadu	蔚蓝色的杭盖	Yela	
2009	Bodyguards and Assassins	十月圍城	Wang Fuming	
2010	Here Comes Fortune	財神到	Gong hitter	cameo
2017	Journey to the West: The Demons Strike Back	西遊2：伏妖篇	Sha Wujing	
