= Cui Yongxi =

Chinese basketball player (born 2003)

Cui Yongxi 崔永熙
No. 24 – Guangdong Southern Tigers
- Position: Shooting guard
- League: CBA

Personal information
- Born: 28 May 2003 (age 23) Yulin, Guangxi, China
- Listed height: 201 cm (6 ft 7 in)
- Listed weight: 93 kg (205 lb)

Career information
- NBA draft: 2024: undrafted
- Playing career: 2022–present

Career history
- 2022–2024: Guangzhou Loong Lions
- 2024: Brooklyn Nets
- 2024: →Long Island Nets
- 2026–present: Guangdong Southern Tigers

Career highlights
- 2× All-CBA Domestic Second Team (2023, 2024); CBA All-Star (2024); CBA All-Star Rookie (2023); CBA Rookie of the Year (2023); CBA All-Star Rookie Challenge MVP (2023)
- Stats at NBA.com
- Stats at Basketball Reference
Medals
Men's basketball
Representing China
Asian Games
Bronze medal – third place	2022 Hangzhou	Team

Cui Yongxi (Chinese: 崔永熙), also known as Jacky Cui (born 28 May 2003), is a Chinese professional basketball player who plays for the Guangdong Southern Tigers of the CBA. He is also a member of the China men's national basketball team. Yongxi previously played for the Brooklyn Nets of the National Basketball Association (NBA) during the 2024–25 NBA season where he only appeared in five regular season games.

== Early life ==
Cui was born in Guangxi, China, to Cui Mingguang, one of the most prolific street basketball players in Southern China. He initially attended, as a 16-year-old, the Basketball Without Borders camp, representing his home country and making a name for himself. Afterwards, he attended the NBA Academy in Canberra, graduating at 18 years old while setting his sights on going pro.

== Professional career ==
=== Guangzhou Loong Lions (2022–2024) ===
Cui began his professional career with the Guangzhou Loong Lions of the Chinese Basketball Association. In his rookie season, he played in 43 games and averaged 12.0 points, 5.7 rebounds, 2.7 assists and 1.8 steals in 30.8 minutes.

In his second year, Cui played 56 games and improved his numbers across the board, averaging 15.7 points, 6 rebounds, 3.3 assists, 1.7 steals, and 0.3 blocks per game in 34.5 minutes while shooting 45.5 percent from the field and 36.4 percent from 3, earning CBA Domestic Second Team honors. After the season ended, he declared for the NBA draft.

=== Brooklyn / Long Island Nets (2024) ===
After going undrafted in the 2024 NBA draft, Cui joined the Portland Trail Blazers for the 2024 NBA Summer League and on 20 September, he signed a two-way contract with the Brooklyn Nets. With his debut on 27 October against the Milwaukee Bucks, Cui became the first Chinese player since Mengke Bateer to play in the NBA while going undrafted, as well as the seventh overall Chinese player to play in the NBA. On 13 December, it was announced he would miss the rest of the season after suffering a torn ACL on his left knee while playing for the Long Island Nets. On 15 December, he was waived by the Nets.

=== Return to CBA (2026–present) ===
On 30 August 2025, Cui returned to China and joined the Guangdong Southern Tigers.

== National team career ==
Cui played for the China men's national basketball team during the 2023 FIBA Basketball World Cup and the next year he played in the Asia Cup qualifiers.

== Career statistics ==
Legend
GP	Games played	GS	Games started	MPG	Minutes per game
FG%	Field goal percentage	3P%	3-point field goal percentage	FT%	Free throw percentage
RPG	Rebounds per game	APG	Assists per game	SPG	Steals per game
BPG	Blocks per game	PPG	Points per game	**Bold**	Career high

=== NBA ===
Year	Team	GP	GS	MPG	FG%	3P%	FT%	RPG	APG	SPG	BPG	PPG
2024–25	Brooklyn	5	0	2.0	.143	.000	.500	.4	.0	.0	.0	.6
Career		5	0	2.0	.143	.000	.500	.4	.0	.0	.0	.6

=== CBA ===
==== Regular season ====
Year	Team	GP	GS	MPG	FG%	3P%	FT%	RPG	APG	SPG	BPG	PPG
2022–23	Guangzhou	39	22	30.2	.453	.371	.899	5.5	2.7	2.0	0.6	11.9
2023–24	Guangzhou	50	46	34.8	.455	.364	.786	6.0	3.3	1.7	0.3	15.7
Career		89	68	32.8	.454	.367	.836	5.8	3.0	1.8	0.4	14.0

==== Playoffs ====
Year	Team	GP	GS	MPG	FG%	3P%	FT%	RPG	APG	SPG	BPG	PPG
2022–23	Guangzhou	4	4	41.5	.346	.280	.643	8.0	2.8	0.3	0.3	13.0
2023–24	Guangzhou	6	6	36.5	.507	.375	.760	4.3	1.3	1.0	0.7	16.7
Career		10	10	38.5	.443	.337	.713	5.8	1.9	0.7	0.5	15.2
