= Tang Zhengdong =

Chinese professional basketball player

Tang Zhendong 唐正东
Personal information
- Born: September 14, 1982 (age 44) Suzhou, Jiangsu, China
- Listed height: 7 ft 0 in (2.13 m)

Career information
- Playing career: 1999–2018
- Position: Center

Career history
- 1999–2011: Jiangsu Dragons
- 2011–2015: Xinjiang Flying Tigers
- 2015–2016: Foshan Long-Lions
- 2016–2018: Nanjing Monkey Kings

Career highlights
- 3×CBA Regular Season MVP Award (2002-03),(2004-05),(2006-07)
Medals
Men's basketball
Representing China
FIBA Asia Cup
Gold medal – first place	2005 Doha
Asian Games
Gold medal – first place	2006 Doha
Gold medal – first place	2010 Guangzhou
East Asian Games
Bronze medal – third place	2005 Macau
FIBA Asia Under-18 Championship
Silver medal – second place	2000 Kuala Lumpur
Gold medal – first place	2002 Kuwait
FIBA Asia Under-20 Championship
Bronze medal – third place	2000 Doha
Silver medal – second place	2004 Tehran

Tang ZhengDong, (simplified Chinese: 唐正东; traditional Chinese: 唐正東; pinyin: Táng Zhèngdōng; born September 14, 1982, in Suzhou, Jiangsu, China) is a Chinese former professional basketball player. At a height of 2.13 m (7 ft 0 in), and a weight of 130 kg (290 lb), he played at the center position.

== Professional career ==
Tang began basketball training in 1995, and he eventually joined the Jiangsu Dragons of the Chinese Basketball Association (CBA). In the 2003–04, 2004–05, and 2006–07 seasons, he was awarded the Chinese Basketball Association MVP award. In 2006, Tang worked out for the NBA's Toronto Raptors.

== Chinese national team ==
Tang trained numerous times with the senior men's Chinese national basketball teamas a center playing behind Yao Ming and Mengke Bateer. He played with China at the 2005 Stanković Cup.

== Player profile ==
Tang stands 2.13 m (7 ft 0 in) tall, and has a robust 130 kg (290 lb) frame. As a center, he is not speedy. His shooting is accurate, so much so, that he is a 3-point shot threat. His playing style has been compared to that of fellow Chinese basketball player Mengke Bateer.

In 2018, Tang retired from professional basketball.

== Notes ==
- This article was originally translated from zh:唐正东.
