= Anthony Myles (basketball, born 1982) =

American basketball player

Personal information
- Born: October 16, 1982 (age 44) Chicago, Illinois
- Listed height: 6 ft 9 in (2.06 m)
- Listed weight: 244 lb (111 kg)

Career information
- High school: Harper (Chicago, Illinois)
- College: Olney CC (2000–2002); Xavier (2002–2004)
- NBA draft: 2004: undrafted
- Playing career: 2004–2014
- Position: Power forward / center

Career history
- 2004: CB Ciudad de Algeciras
- 2005: Banvit B.K.
- 2005–2008: Dongguan New Century
- 2008–2009: Ironi Ramat Gan
- 2009: Heilongjiang Daqing
- 2009–2010: Steaua Turabo București
- 2010: Ilysiakos
- 2010–2011: Crvena zvezda
- 2011: Liaoning Panpan Hunters
- 2011–2013: Club Malvín
- 2013–2014: Argentino de Junín

Career highlights
- 2× CBA Scoring champion (2006, 2007)

Anthony Myles (born October 16, 1982) is an American former professional basketball player.

== Professional career ==
After going undrafted in the 2004 NBA draft, Myles signed with CB Ciudad de Algeciras of Spain. However, he was released in December 2004. In January 2005, he signed with Banvit B.K. of the Turkish Basketball League for the rest of the season.

He played with the Dongguan New Century of the Chinese Basketball Association from 2005 to 2008. He was leading scorer of CBA in the 2005–06 season. For the 2008–09 season he signed with Ironi Ramat Gan of Israel.

In December 2009, he signed with Steaua Turabo București of the Romanian Basketball Division A for the rest of the 2009–10 season. In October 2010, he signed with Ilysiakos of the Greek Basket League, but was released after only 2 games.

In November 2010, he signed with Crvena zvezda of Serbia. He was released in February 2011. He then signed with the Liaoning Panpan Hunters of China for the rest of the season.

In September 2013, he signed with Argentino de Junín of Argentina for the 2013–14 season. He left them in January 2014.
