= Du Feng =

Chinese basketball player and coach

Du Feng 杜锋
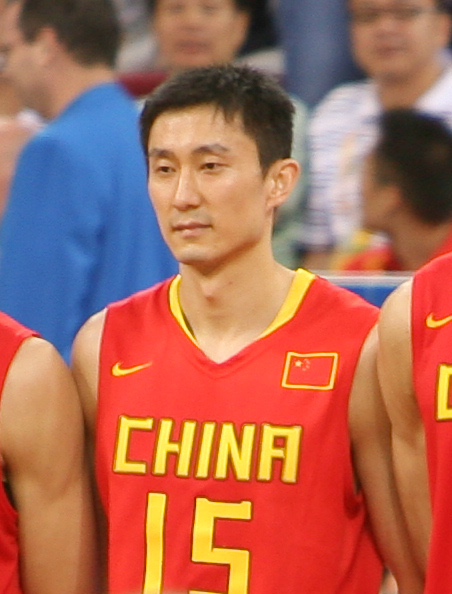
- Du Feng - Beijing 2008 Olympics

Personal information
- Born: 30 July 1981 (age 45) Ürümqi, Xinjiang, China
- Listed height: 6 ft 10.3 in (2.09 m)
- Listed weight: 220 lb (100 kg)

Career information
- Playing career: 1997–2011
- Position: Power forward / center
- Number: 4, 15
- Coaching career: 2011–present

Career history

Playing
- 1997–2011: Guangdong Southern Tigers

Coaching
- 2011–2013: Guangdong Southern Tigers (assistant)
- 2013–2017, 2018–2026: Guangdong Southern Tigers
- 2017–2018: China Blue
- 2019–2022: China

Career highlights
- As player: 7× CBA champion (2004-2006), (2008-2011); 1× CBA Finals MVP (2004); As head coach: 3× CBA champion (2019-2021); As assistant coach: 1× CBA champion (2013) 3× Coach of the year - (2019-2021)
Medals
Men's basketball
Representing China
FIBA Asia Cup
Silver medal – second place	2009 Tianjin
Asian Games
Silver medal – second place	2002 Busan
East Asian Games
Gold medal – first place	2001 Osaka
Universiade Games
Silver medal – second place	2001 Beijing

Du Feng (simplified Chinese: 杜锋; traditional Chinese: 杜鋒; pinyin: Dù Fēng; born July 30, 1981, in Ürümqi, Xinjiang) is a Chinese professional basketball coach and former player.

At a height of 2.07 meters (6' 9 1/2"), and a weight of 100 kilograms (220 pounds), he played as a power forward-center.

== Playing career ==
=== Professional ===
Du was the Chinese Basketball Association (CBA) Finals MVP in 2004 with the Guangdong Southern Tigers, a team based in Dongguan, Guangdong, where he completed his career and retired from competition at the close of the 2011-12 CBA season.

=== National team ===
Du competed at the 2004 Summer Olympics and 2008 Summer Olympics with the Chinese men's national basketball team (Team China). He also helped China finish with silver medals at the 2002 Asian Games and the 2009 FIBA Asia Championship.

== Coaching career ==
=== Professional ===
Du started his coaching career as an assistant to Li Chunjiang at Guangdong in the 2012-13 CBA season, but moved into the head coaching spot on an interim basis when Li resigned in January, after nearly 13 years leading the Southern Tigers. The team went on to win their record-tying eighth title in the 2013 CBA Finals with Du being named head coach on a permanent basis as a result of that success. Guangdong did not return to the championship round again until the 2017 CBA Finals when they lost to the Xinjiang Flying Tigers.

=== National team ===
In April 2017, it was revealed that Du was appointed as the head coach of one of the two Chinese national basketball teams formed by the Chinese Basketball Association, in preparation for the 2019 FIBA Basketball World Cup and 2020 Summer Olympics. Du was assigned to coach the China Blue team while Li Nan would mentor the China Red team. In September 2018, Li Nan was announced as the head coach of China's reunified national team, while Du would return to his previous job with the Guangdong Southern Tigers.

Du was selected as head coach of China's squad for the 2023 FIBA Basketball World Cup qualification.
