= Xinjiang Flying Tigers =

Basketball team in China

- Leagues: CBA
- Founded: 1999; 27 years ago
- History: Xinjiang Flying Tigers (1999–present)
- Arena: Ürümqi Olympic Sports Center
- Capacity: 12,000
- Location: Ürümqi, Xinjiang, China
- Team colors: Blue, white, orange
- Main sponsor: Guanghui Group
- Head coach: Jiang Zhengxiu
- Team captain: Abdusalam Abdurixit
- Ownership: Sun Guangxin
- Championships: 1 (2017)
Home	Away	Third

Xinjiang Flying Tigers
- Chinese: 新疆广汇飞虎
- Hanyu Pinyin: Xīnjiāng Guǎnghuì Fēihǔ
Transcriptions
Standard Mandarin
- Hanyu Pinyin: Xīnjiāng Guǎnghuì Fēihǔ
- Wade–Giles: Hsin^{1}chiang^{1} Kuang^{3}hui^{4} Fei^{1}hu^{3}
Yue: Cantonese
- Yale Romanization: Syin1 jyang1 Gwang3 hwei4 Fei1 hu3
- Jyutping: San1 goeng1 Jim2 wui6 Fei1 fu2

The Xinjiang Flying Tigers (Chinese: 新疆广汇飞虎) are a professional basketball team based in Ürümqi, Xinjiang, China. The team plays its home games at the Ürümqi Olympic Sports Center, which has a capacity for 12,000 spectators. The club joined the Chinese Basketball Association Division 2 in the 1999–2000 CBA season, advanced to Division 1A in the 2002–03 season, and had three consecutive Grand Finals appearances in the 2008–09, 2009–10 and 2010–11 seasons. The Flying Tigers won their first Championship in the 2016–17 CBA season, defeating Guangdong Southern Tigers 4–0 in the finals.

== History ==
The Xinjiang Flying Tigers joined the Chinese Basketball Association's Division 2 ahead of the 1999–2000 CBA season, as the first step in the league's plans to expand into the country's western interior. The Flying Tigers won their Division 2 season undefeated and advanced to the Division 1B. Two years later, the Flying Tigers won the 2001–02 season of Division 1B and advanced to Division 1A.

In their first Division 1A season, the Flying Tigers managed to advance to the playoffs, but lost to Beijing Ducks in a 3–1 quarter-final series. After this season, they qualified for the playoffs for another three consecutive seasons, but was never able to advance beyond the first round. In the 2007–08 season, the Flying Tigers signed the former NBA player Mengke Bateer, who brought the team to the second place in regular season. However, a Flying Tigers player, Sou Song Cun, also known as Guan Xiuchang, was found to have a foreign nationality but registered as a domestic player. The league punished the Flying Tigers by treating every game that Sou Song Cun played as a loss for the Flying Tigers. As a result, the Flying Tigers dropped to eleventh place, and missed the playoffs.

After the disappointing season, head coach Jiang Xingquan promoted several young players from the youth team to the first team, including Shirelijan Muxtar and Kyranbek Makhan, who would go on to become the most iconic players of the franchise. Together with Bateer and Jiang, they created the first golden era of the Xinjiang Flying Tigers. Bateer became the first player to win three consecutive CBA MVPs, and the team made it to three consecutive CBA Grand Finals. However, in each of the Grand Finals series, Xinjiang lost to the Guangdong Southern Tigers.

The Flying Tigers started its rebuild in the 2012–13 season. They reached the Grand Finals the next season with a relatively low-key roster, but lost to Beijing Ducks 4–2. Before the 2014–15 season, Xinjiang signed Zhou Qi to build a team around him. Surrounding Zhou Qi, the Flying Tigers signed former NBA stars Andray Blatche and Jordan Crawford. However, Crawford left the team after a few games into the season for medical reasons and refused to return. Losing a key piece of the championship contending roster, the team struggled to find a replacement through the season and ended the season in ninth place, missing the playoffs. The next season, Xinjiang signed championship coach Li Qiuping and all-star forward Li Gen and lost to Sichuan Blue Whales 3–0 in the semi-finals.

In the 2016–17 season, the Flying Tigers signed Bulgarian guard Darius Adams. The star-filled roster of Andray Blatche, Darius Adams, Zhou Qi, Li Gen, Shirelijan Muxtar, and Kyranbek Makhan triumphed through the season, finishing in first place in the regular season. In the playoffs, Xinjiang defeated Shandong Kingston Lions 3–0 in the quarter-finals and Liaoning Flying Leopards 4–1 in the semi-finals. In the Grand Finals, the Flying Tigers defeated their long-time rival Guangdong Southern Tigers in a dominating 4–0 series to win the first ever championship in the franchise's history. Darius Adams won the FMVP award.

After winning the championship, Zhou Qi went to the NBA and joined the Houston Rockets. Losing the all-star center, Xinjiang finished the season with a 3–1 loss to Guangdong Southern Tigers in the quarter-finals. The next season, the team changed the head coach mid-season, signing another championship coach, the Xinjiang native Adiljan Suleyman. The team also changed the foreign players four times during the season, trying Al Jefferson, Nick Minnerath, Hamed Haddadi, and Darius Adams, and finally settled with Jarnell Stokes and Kay Felder at the start of the playoffs. The team reached the Grand Finals, where they lost to Guangdong Southern Tigers 4–0.

In March 2023, the Xinjiang Flying Tigers withdrew from the CBA in protest against a penalty that would have banned the club from signing new players for one year, following contract disputes between the club and Zhou Qi. However, the decision was overturned two weeks later and the club returned back to the league.

== Players ==
=== Current roster ===
Note: Flags indicate national team eligibility at FIBA-sanctioned events. Players may hold other non-FIBA nationalities not displayed.

Xinjiang Flying Tigers roster
Players
Coaches

Pos.	No.	Nat.	Name	Ht.	Wt.
G	0	(China)	Xierzhati Saimati	1.93 m (6 ft 4 in)	87 kg (192 lb)
SG	1	(United States)	Cameron Young	1.97 m (6 ft 6 in)	99 kg (218 lb)
PG	2	(China)	Li Junjie	1.83 m (6 ft 0 in)	88 kg (194 lb)
G/F	4	(China)	Yilifulati Monhetaner	1.97 m (6 ft 6 in)	96 kg (212 lb)
PF	5	(United States) (Lebanon)	Dedric Lawson	2.06 m (6 ft 9 in)	120 kg (265 lb)
SF	6	(China)	Yang Rui	2.02 m (6 ft 8 in)	88 kg (194 lb)
PG	7	(Chinese Taipei)	Chang Chun-sheng	1.87 m (6 ft 2 in)	83 kg (183 lb)
G	8	(China)	Yin Zhaohang	1.85 m (6 ft 1 in)	80 kg (176 lb)
C	9	(China)	Wu Guanxi	2.11 m (6 ft 11 in)	108 kg (238 lb)
G/F	10	(China)	Feng Ao	2.04 m (6 ft 8 in)	85 kg (187 lb)
C	13	(China)	Li Yanzhe	2.14 m (7 ft 0 in)	129 kg (284 lb)
PF	14	(China)	Zhang Qingze	2.07 m (6 ft 9 in)	85 kg (187 lb)
C	16	(China)	Zhang Yilong	2.05 m (6 ft 9 in)	90 kg (198 lb)
F/C	19	(China)	Qu Xiaoyu	2.06 m (6 ft 9 in)	103 kg (227 lb)
PF	23	(China)	Abdusalam Abdurixit (C)	2.02 m (6 ft 8 in)	104 kg (229 lb)
PG	24	(United States)	Zavier Simpson	1.83 m (6 ft 0 in)	87 kg (192 lb)
PF	34	(China)	Aizimaiti Tuxun	2.03 m (6 ft 8 in)	123 kg (271 lb)
PG	36	(China)	Ge Haoran	1.84 m (6 ft 0 in)	84 kg (185 lb)
SF	70	(China)	Qi Lin	1.99 m (6 ft 6 in)	91 kg (201 lb)

Head coach

- (China) Jiang Zhengxiu

Assistant coach(es)

- (Greece) Nikos Vetoulas
- (China) Mawlan Tursun
- (China) Murat Adilja

Legend

- (C) Team captain
- Injured

- Roster
Updated: October 13, 2026

== Season-by-season record ==
CBA season record
Season	Regular season ranking	Playoff finish	Last series
2002–03	4th	Quarter-finals	Lost 1–3 against Beijing Ducks
2003–04	5th	Quarter-finals	Lost 1–2 against Jilin Northeast Tigers
2004–05	3rd (North)	Quarter-finals	Lost 0–2 against Jiangsu Dragons
2005–06	2nd (North)	Quarter-finals	Lost 0–3 against Jiangsu Dragons
2006–07	9th	Did not qualify	
2007–08	11th	Did not qualify	
2008–09	2nd	Runners-up	Lost 1–4 against Guangdong Southern Tigers
2009–10	2nd	Runners-up	Lost 1–4 against Guangdong Southern Tigers
2010–11	1st	Runners-up	Lost 2–4 against Guangdong Southern Tigers
2011–12	4th	Semi-finals	Lost 0–3 against Guangdong Southern Tigers
2012–13	4th	Semi-finals	Lost 0–3 against Guangdong Southern Tigers
2013–14	2nd	Runners-up	Lost 2–4 against Beijing Ducks
2014–15	9th	Did not qualify	
2015–16	2nd	Semi-finals	Lost 0–3 against Sichuan Blue Whales
2016–17	1st	Champions	Won 4–0 against Guangdong Southern Tigers
2017–18	6th	Quarter-finals	Lost 1–3 against Guangdong Southern Tigers
2018–19	3rd	Runners-up	Lost 0–4 against Guangdong Southern Tigers
2019–20	2nd	Semi-finals	Lost 0–2 against Liaoning Flying Leopards
2020–21	4th	Quarter-finals	Lost against Shandong Heroes (one game only)
2021–22	14th	Did not qualify	
2022–23	17th	Did not qualify	
2023–24	2nd	Runners-up	Lost 0–4 against Liaoning Flying Leopards

== Honours ==
=== Continental competitions ===
- FIBA Asia Champions Cup (Note: Xinjiang represented China under the name "China Kashgar".)

Champions: 2016
Runners-up: 2017

=== Domestic competitions ===
- Chinese Basketball Association

Playoffs champions: 2016–17
Playoffs runners-up (6): 2008–09, 2009–10, 2010–11, 2013–14, 2018–19, 2023–24
Regular season champions (2): 2010–11, 2016–17
Regular season runners-up (7): 2005–06 (North), 2008–09, 2009–10, 2013–14, 2015–16, 2019–20, 2023–24
