= Shang Ping =

Chinese basketball player

Shang Ping 尚平
Personal information
- Born: December 23, 1984 (age 41) Harbin, Heilongjiang, China
- Listed height: 6 ft 9 in (2.06 m)
- Listed weight: 240 lb (109 kg)

Career information
- High school: Avondale College (Auckland, New Zealand)
- College: Illinois Central CC (2005–2007); Nebraska (2007–2008); Emporia State (2008–2009)
- NBA draft: 2009: undrafted
- Playing career: 2009–2016
- Position: Power forward / center

Career history
- 2009–2010: Beijing Ducks
- 2010–2012: Shanxi Brave Dragons
- 2012–2013: Qingdao Eagles
- 2013–2014: Panathinaikos
- 2014–2016: Tianjin Gold Lions

Shang Ping (Chinese: 尚平 (pronounced Shung); born December 23, 1984), also known as Eric Shang, is a Chinese former professional basketball player who played in the Chinese Basketball Association. He is a 2.06 m (6 ft 9 in) tall power forward-center, and his nickname is "The Beast". He became the first Chinese player to ever sign with a Euroleague club, when he joined the Greek League team Panathinaikos for the 2013–14 season.

== College career ==
After playing high school basketball at Avondale College in Auckland, New Zealand, Shang played college basketball at Illinois Central Community College from 2005 to 2007, at the University of Nebraska–Lincoln, where he played with the Nebraska Cornhuskers from 2007 to 2008, and at Emporia State University from 2008 to 2009.

== Professional career ==
Shang began his pro career with the Beijing Ducks of the Chinese Basketball Association in 2009. In 2010, he moved to the Chinese club Shanxi Brave Dragons, and in 2012 he joined the Chinese club Qingdao Eagles, where he was a teammate of Tracy McGrady.

Shang moved to the Greek League club Panathinaikos in 2013, thus becoming the first Chinese player to ever play in a European basketball league. He returned to China in 2014 and spent the next two seasons with the Tianjin Gold Lions.

== Awards and honors ==
=== Club career ===
- Greek Cup Champion: (2014)
- Greek League Champion: (2014)
