= Dan Fegan =

American sports agent and lawyer

- Born: February 11, 1962
- Died: February 25, 2018 (aged 56)
- Education: Yale Law School (JD)
- Occupations: Sports agent, lawyer
- Known for: Representing National Basketball Association clients
- Children: 1

Daniel John Fegan (February 11, 1962 – February 25, 2018) was an American sports agent and lawyer, active within the National Basketball Association.

== Biography ==
Fegan graduated from Yale Law School and operated out of a Los Angeles law firm. His first client was Chris Dudley, a friend from Yale.

On March 10, 2017, Independent Sports & Entertainment announced that Fegan had been terminated.

== Death ==
Fegan died in a car accident in Aspen, Colorado on February 25, 2018. He was survived by his five-year-old son, who, along with an unidentified 29-year-old woman, were airlifted to a Denver hospital with serious injuries in the same incident.

== NBA clients ==
- DeMarcus Cousins
- Monta Ellis
- Kris Humphries
- Chandler Parsons
- Nene Hilario
- Drew Gooden
- Ricky Rubio
- Jason Terry
- Larry Sanders
- J.J. Barea
- Dwight Howard
- John Wall
