= Tyrone Washington =

American basketball player (born 1976)

Personal information
- Born: September 16, 1976 (age 50) East St. Louis, Illinois, U.S.
- Listed height: 6 ft 10 in (2.08 m)
- Listed weight: 275 lb (125 kg)

Career information
- High school: Gentry (Indianola, Mississippi)
- College: Mississippi State (1995–1999)
- NBA draft: 1999: 2nd round, 44th overall pick
- Drafted by: Houston Rockets
- Playing career: 1999–2008
- Position: Power forward

Career history
- 1999–2000: Banca Popolare Ragusa
- 2000: San Angelo All-Stars
- 2000–2001: Viola Reggio Calabria
- 2001–2002: Fabriano Basket
- 2002: KK Crvena zvezda
- 2002–2003: Columbus Riverdragons
- 2003–2004: Galatasaray
- 2004: Purefoods Tender Juicy Giants
- 2004–2005: Scafati Basket
- 2005: Andrea Costa Imola
- 2005–2006: Fujian Xunxing
- 2006: Capitanes de Arecibo
- 2006–2007: Henan Jigang Dragons
- 2007–2008: Busan KT Sonicboom
- 2008: Al-Ittihad Aleppo
- 2008: Cariduros de Fajardo

Career highlights
- Third-team All-SEC (1998); Fourth-team Parade All-American (1995)
- Stats at Basketball Reference

Tyrone Lamar Washington (born September 16, 1976) is an American former professional basketball player. He played college basketball at Mississippi State University before being drafted by the Houston Rockets in the 1999 NBA draft. However, he played professionally overseas and in the NBA Development League.

== Early life and college ==
Born in East St. Louis, Illinois, Washington graduated from Gentry High School in Indianola, Mississippi in 1995. Gatorade named Washington the Mississippi Boys' Basketball Player of the Year in his senior year, and Washington also was a fourth-team All-American pick by Parade magazine.

In his freshman year with the Mississippi State Bulldogs men's basketball team, Washington was a backup center behind future NBA player Erick Dampier. Washington averaged 1.8 points and 2.1 rebounds as a freshman; he also blocked 13 shots and made 41% of field goal tries and 60% of free throw attempts. After the NBA drafted Dampier in 1996, Washington became the starting center. In 1996–1997, Washington co-led the Southeastern Conference (SEC) in blocked shots (2 blocks per game), and his 7.9 rebounds per game was the second-most in the conference. In 1998, Washington was a third-team all-SEC pick.

== Professional career ==
Washington made his professional debut with the Italian team Banca Popolare Ragusa of Serie A2 in the 1999–2000 season. In the middle of the following season, he joined Viola Reggio Calabria then played 35 games with Fabriano Basket in 2001–2002. With Fabriano, Washington averaged 9.9 points and 7.1 rebounds. He also played semi-pro with the San Angelo All-Stars of the Southwest Basketball League in 2000. In 2002, Washington joined the Los Angeles Clippers for NBA Summer League. After playing five games with the Serbian team KK Crvena zvezda, in which he averaged 8 points, 4.6 rebounds, and 1.4 assists per game, he signed with the Columbus Riverdragons for the 2002–2003 season. With the Riverdragons, Washington played 37 games and started 27 games, scored an average of 8.2 points, grabbed 4.4 rebounds, and made 0.8 assists per game.

Washington played with Galatasaray of the Turkish Basketball League in the 2003–2004 season. He was released in April 2004. The following month he signed with Purefoods Tender Juicy Giants of the Philippine Basketball Association. On July 23, 2004, he signed with the Italian team Scafati Basket.

In 2005, the Fujian Xunxing of the Chinese Basketball Association drafted Washington as the second overall pick of international players. With Fujian, Washington averaged 27.3 points and 12.6 rebounds per game in 2005–2006 season. By the end of March 2006, Washington signed with the Capitanes de Arecibo of Baloncesto Superior Nacional of Puerto Rico. With the Capitanes, Washington played in four games during April 2006, including a 28-point performance on April 7. The Henan Jigang Dragons of the CBA drafted Washington as the top overall pick in 2006.

The Busan KT Sonicboom of the Korean Basketball League drafted Washington as the top pick in the second round of the 2007 KBL draft. In February 2008, he signed with Al-Ittihad Aleppo of the Syrian Basketball League. On May 20, 2008, Washington debuted with the Puerto Rican team Cariduros de Fajardo. In 3 games, Washington averaged 7 points and 6.7 rebounds.
