= Shanxi Loongs =

Basketball team in Taiyuan, China

- League: CBA
- Founded: 2001
- History: Henan Dragons (2001–2006); Shanxi Dragons (2006–2007); Shanxi Brave Dragons (2007–2018); Shanxi Loongs (2018–present)
- Arena: Shanxi Sports Centre Gymnasium; Taiyuan Riverside Sports Centre Gymnasium
- Capacity: 8,000
- Location: Taiyuan, Shanxi, China
- Team colors: White, Burgundy, Orange
- Head coach: Vytautas Buzas
- Ownership: Shanxi Guotou
- Championships: None
Home	Away	Third

The Shanxi Loongs, also known as Shanxi SDIC Raptors Club or Shanxi Fenjiu Shares are a Chinese professional basketball team based in Taiyuan, Shanxi, which plays in the Northern Division of the Chinese Basketball Association (CBA). The Shanxi Fenjiu Company is the club's corporate sponsor, while its mascot is a dragon.

The team was known in English as the Shanxi Brave Dragons from the Summer of 2007 until September 2018, when a rebranding ceremony was held, unveiling a new logo and nickname. Loong is the Chinese word for dragon, in both Mandarin and Cantonese.

== History ==
Originally known as the Henan Renhe Dragons (河南仁和) due to corporate sponsorship by the Henan Renhe Group (河南仁和集团), the team rebranded as a result of an agreement signed with the Henan Jiyuan Iron & Steel Group (河南济源钢铁集团) in early November, just before the CBA's 2004–05 regular season began (jigang is an abbreviation for jiyuan gangtie or Jiyuan Iron & Steel).

In conjunction with this change—the club moved from its original home city of Zhengzhou to Jiyuan—in the middle of its first season. From 2004 to 2006 they were known as the Henan Jigang Dragons (河南济钢猛龙) or Henan Jigang or Henan Dragons, and were based in both Jiyuan and Luoyang, Henan.

During the 2004–05 CBA season, the team's first in the league, the Henan Dragons finished in seventh and last place in the CBA's North Division and out of the playoffs. In the 2005–06 CBA season they suffered the same fate yet again.

Before the 2006–07 CBA season, the team headed to Taiyuan, and changed its name to the Shanxi Yujun Dragons or Shanxi Yujun or Shanxi Dragons. They signed with a new sponsor the following year, and became known as the Shanxi Zhongyu Brave Dragons, but the club has fared little better on the court since its relocation.

In January 2010, the Brave Dragons signed former NBA All-Star Stephon Marbury. He only stayed with Shanxi through the end of the 2009–10 CBA season, before leaving for Foshan, and eventually Beijing.

In August 2011, the Brave Dragons played an exhibition game against the Georgetown University Hoyas during the Washington, D.C. squad's two-week summer trip to China, but lost by a final score of 98–81.

== Playing in the IBL ==
The Shanxi Zhongyu Brave Dragons participated in the 2008 season of the International Basketball League (IBL). The IBL is a spring/summer league based in Portland, Oregon. They were housed at the United States Basketball Academy.

== Roster ==
Note: Flags indicate national team eligibility at FIBA-sanctioned events. Players may hold other non-FIBA nationalities not displayed.

Shanxi Loongs roster
Players
Coaches

Pos.	No.	Nat.	Name	Ht.	Wt.
PG	0	(China)	Xu Weishi	1.94 m (6 ft 4 in)	85 kg (187 lb)
PG	1	(China)	Chen Peng Yudi	1.84 m (6 ft 0 in)	75 kg (165 lb)
G	3	(China)	Jia Mingru	1.84 m (6 ft 0 in)	80 kg (176 lb)
G	5	(Chinese Taipei)	Wei Liang-che	1.85 m (6 ft 1 in)	76 kg (168 lb)
G/F	6	(China)	Yumiti Sedak	1.96 m (6 ft 5 in)	93 kg (205 lb)
SG	7	(China)	Yuan Shuai	1.94 m (6 ft 4 in)	90 kg (198 lb)
G/F	8	(China)	Zhang Ning	1.91 m (6 ft 3 in)	97 kg (214 lb)
F	9	(China)	Zhao Jiaren	2.03 m (6 ft 8 in)	96 kg (212 lb)
PG	10	(China)	Xie Zhijie	1.92 m (6 ft 4 in)	88 kg (194 lb)
SF	11	(United States)	Hamidou Diallo	1.98 m (6 ft 6 in)	89 kg (196 lb)
F/C	12	(France)	Petr Cornelie	2.11 m (6 ft 11 in)	100 kg (220 lb)
SF	16	(China)	Liu Xianglong	1.96 m (6 ft 5 in)	96 kg (212 lb)
PF	17	(China)	Jiao Hailong	2.06 m (6 ft 9 in)	103 kg (227 lb)
PF	18	(China)	Han Peiyu	2.05 m (6 ft 9 in)	105 kg (231 lb)
C	21	(China)	Liu Chuanxing	2.25 m (7 ft 5 in)	130 kg (287 lb)
G	28	(United States)	Lindell Wigginton	1.88 m (6 ft 2 in)	92 kg (203 lb)
SF	29	(China)	Qin Zilong	1.97 m (6 ft 6 in)	85 kg (187 lb)
F	31	(China)	Wang Junjie	2.06 m (6 ft 9 in)	113 kg (249 lb)
C	35	(China)	Ge Zhaobao	2.14 m (7 ft 0 in)	121 kg (267 lb)

Head coach

- (Lithuania) Vytautas Buzas

Assistant coach(es)

- (Lithuania) Paulius Juodis

Legend

- (C) Team captain
- Injured

- Roster
Updated: October 1, 2026

== Notable players ==
Note: Flags indicate national team eligibility at FIBA-sanctioned events. Players may hold other non-FIBA nationalities not displayed.

Criteria

To appear in this section a player must have either:

- Set a club record or won an individual award while at the club
- Played at least one official international match for their national team at any time
- Played at least one official NBA match at any time.

Current International players

- (United States) Jamaal Franklin (2019–present)
- (United States) Eric Moreland (2019–present)

Former Chinese players

- (China) Shan Tao (2007–08)
- (China) Shang Ping (2010–12)
- (China) Wang Lei (2005–07)
- (Chinese Taipei) Wu Tai-hao (2015–2018)

Former International players

- (Jordan) Zaid Abbas (2014–15)
- (United States) Yancy Gates (2015)
- (United States) Alexander Johnson (2011)
- (United States) Dominique Jones (2015)
- (United States) Stephon Marbury (2010)
- (Nigeria) (United Kingdom) Olumide Oyedeji (2008–09)
- (United States) Tim Pickett (2009)
- (United States) Leon Rodgers (2010–11)
- (United States) (Venezuela) Donta Smith (2008–10)
- (United States) Shawn Taggart (2011)
- (United States) Maurice Taylor (2009–10)
- (United States) Jeremy Tyler (2014–15)
- (United States) Von Wafer (2014–15)
- (United States) Bonzi Wells (2008–09)
- (United States) Marcus Williams (2011–14)
- (Haiti) (Canada) Samuel Dalembert (2015–17)
- (United States) Jamaal Franklin (2015–17)
- (United States) Henry Sims (2016–17)
- (United States) Brandon Jennings (2017–18)
- (Argentina) Luis Scola (2017–18)
- (Russia) Alexey Shved (2023–24)

== Trivia ==
The team and their former coach Bob Weiss are subject of the book Brave Dragons, A Chinese Basketball Team, an American Coach and Two Cultures Clashing which is about the experience of Weiss while he was coaching the team during the 2008–2009 season.
