= Yunnan Running Bulls =

Chinese basketball team

- Sport: Basketball
- Founded: 2004
- League: Chinese Basketball Association (CBA)
- Based in: Kunming, Yunnan, China
- Colors
- Head coach: Ma Lianbao
- Mascot: Bull

Yunnan Honghe Running Bulls (simplified Chinese: 云南红河奔牛; traditional Chinese: 雲南紅河奔牛; pinyin: yún nán hóng hé bēn niú) or Yunnan Honghe or Yunnan Running Bulls were a basketball team in the Southern Division of the Chinese Basketball Association (CBA), based in Mengzi, Honghe, Yunnan (simplified Chinese: 云南省红河自治州蒙自市; traditional Chinese: 雲南省紅河自治州蒙自市; pinyin: yún nán shěng hóng hé zì zhì zhōu méng zì shì).

They won the 2004 Chinese Basketball League (CBL) championship and were promoted to the CBA for the 2004–2005 season, replacing the disqualified Beijing Olympians.

In the 2004–2005 season, the Yunnan Running Bulls finished in fourth place in the Southern Division and upset the Northern Division's Liaoning Hunters in the quarter-finals, but lost in the semi-finals to the Jiangsu Dragons. In 2005–2006 they again finished in fourth place in the Southern Division, but were eliminated by the Northern Division's Beijing Ducks in the quarter-finals.
