= Shandong Hi-Speed Kirin =

Shandong Hi-Speed Kirin 山东高速麒麟俱乐部
- League: CBA
- Founded: 1995; 31 years ago
- History: Shandong Flaming Bulls (1995–2003); Shandong Lions (2003–2004); Shandong Gold Lions (2004–2014); Shandong Golden Stars (2014–2019); Shandong Heroes (2019–2021); Shandong Hi-Speed Kirin (2021–present)
- Arena: Shandong Arena
- Capacity: 8,800
- Location: Jinan, Shandong, China
- Main sponsor: Hi-Speed Group
- Head coach: Qiu Biao
Home	Away

Shandong Hi-Speed Kirin (Chinese: 山东高速麒麟俱乐部) is a Chinese professional basketball team based in Jinan, Shandong, competing in the Northern Division of the Chinese Basketball Association (CBA). Some of the team's home games are also held in the nearby city of Linyi.

The club's corporate sponsor is the Hi-Speed Group, succeeding its long-time previous corporate sponsor, Kingston.

== History ==
In its early years, the team was known as the Shandong Flaming Bulls (山东火牛), but was renamed the Shandong Lions at the start of the 2003–04 CBA season. At the same time, the club moved its homecourt from Jinan to Yantai (six games) and Dongying (five games). For the 2004–05 CBA season, they relocated to Tai'an, but have been back in Jinan since the 2005–06 CBA season.

During the 2004–05 CBA season, the freshly-rebranded Shandong Gold Lions finished in sixth place in the CBA North Division, and out of the playoffs. In the 2005–06 season, the team finished fifth, yet again out of the playoffs.

The club's most successful campaign so far has been the 2012–13 CBA season, when it advanced to the CBA Finals, but got swept in the best-of-seven championship series in just four games by the Guangdong Southern Tigers.

== Players ==
=== Current roster ===
Note: Flags indicate national team eligibility at FIBA-sanctioned events. Players may hold other non-FIBA nationalities not displayed.

Shandong Hi-Speed Kirin roster
Players
Coaches

Pos.	No.	Nat.	Name	Ht.	Wt.
PG	1	(China)	Gao Shiyan	1.86 m (6 ft 1 in)	82 kg (181 lb)
F/C	2	(Senegal)	Ibrahima Fall Faye	2.08 m (6 ft 10 in)	105 kg (231 lb)
SF	3	(China)	Xu Mengjun	1.97 m (6 ft 6 in)	92 kg (203 lb)
SG	5	(China)	Wang Zheng	1.90 m (6 ft 3 in)	80 kg (176 lb)
SF	7	(China)	Zhu Mingzhen	1.97 m (6 ft 6 in)	112 kg (247 lb)
G	9	(Puerto Rico)	Alfonso Plummer	1.85 m (6 ft 1 in)	82 kg (181 lb)
PG	11	(China)	Li Zhengle	1.92 m (6 ft 4 in)	85 kg (187 lb)
SG	12	(China)	Xie Wenzheng	1.90 m (6 ft 3 in)	80 kg (176 lb)
PF	14	(China)	Guo Kai	2.05 m (6 ft 9 in)	106 kg (234 lb)
F/C	15	(China)	Zhao Haoran	2.10 m (6 ft 11 in)	97 kg (214 lb)
C	20	(China)	Tao Hanlin	2.08 m (6 ft 10 in)	130 kg (287 lb)
PF	21	(China)	Chang Haoran	2.04 m (6 ft 8 in)	90 kg (198 lb)
F/C	22	(China)	Yang Wenhua	2.06 m (6 ft 9 in)	122 kg (269 lb)
SG	23	(China)	Yu Zhengxin	1.85 m (6 ft 1 in)	75 kg (165 lb)
SG	24	(China)	Peng Hongsen	1.91 m (6 ft 3 in)	76 kg (168 lb)
SG	25	(China)	Wang Lanqin	1.85 m (6 ft 1 in)	75 kg (165 lb)
PG	33	(China)	Mi Jianrui	1.86 m (6 ft 1 in)	82 kg (181 lb)
SG	44	(China)	Chen Peidong	1.88 m (6 ft 2 in)	85 kg (187 lb)
PG	45	(Canada)	Dalano Banton	2.03 m (6 ft 8 in)	92 kg (203 lb)
SF	51	(China)	Chen Linjian	1.97 m (6 ft 6 in)	88 kg (194 lb)
SG	77	(China)	Yao Keyu	1.95 m (6 ft 5 in)	93 kg (205 lb)

Head coach

- (China) Qiu Biao

Assistant coach(es)

- (China) Ju Weisong

Legend

- (C) Team captain
- Injured

- Roster
Updated: 12 October 2026
