= Jilin Northeast Tigers =

- League: CBA
- Founded: 1956; 70 years ago
- History: Jilin Northeast Tigers (1956–present)
- Arena: Changchun Gymnasium, 10,000 capacity
- Location: Changchun, Jilin, China
- Team colors: White, Black, Red, Gold
- Head coach: (China) Li Ang
- Ownership: (China) Kenneth Huang
- Championships: None
Home	Away	Third

The Jilin Northeast Tigers (吉林东北虎) or Jilin Tonggang, Jilin Tonggang Northeast Tigers (吉林通钢东北虎) or Jiutai Rural Commercial Bank are a professional basketball team based in Changchun, Jilin, China, which plays in the North Division of the Chinese Basketball Association. The Tonggang Group is the club's corporate sponsor while its mascot is a Siberian tiger.

== History ==
The team was founded in 1956 but became a professional club in 1998. It was known as Jilin Henghe (吉林恒和) in the 2000–01 CBA season, Jilin Jiliang (吉林吉粮) in the 2001–02 CBA season, and Jilin Yiqi (吉林一汽) in the 2002–03 CBA season. The multiple name changes reflect the annual turnover in corporate sponsorship that characterized this era.

During the 2004–05 CBA season, the Jilin Northeast Tigers finished in fourth place in the CBA's North Division, but lost in the Quarter-Finals of the CBA Playoffs to the defending champions, the South Division's Guangdong Southern Tigers.

In the 2005–06 CBA season, they posted the same finish, and ultimately suffered exactly the same fate. This was the third year in a row, in fact, that the Northeast Tigers were eliminated from the CBA Playoffs by the Southern Tigers.

== Roster ==
Note: Flags indicate national team eligibility at FIBA-sanctioned events. Players may hold other non-FIBA nationalities not displayed.

Jilin Northeast Tigers roster
Players
Coaches

Pos.	No.	Nat.	Name	Ht.	Wt.	Age
PG	1	(United States) (Montenegro)	Justin Cobbs	1.91 m (6 ft 3 in)	94 kg (207 lb)	35 – 16 March 1991
SG	3	(United States) (Trinidad and Tobago)	DeVaughn Akoon-Purcell	1.96 m (6 ft 5 in)	91 kg (201 lb)	33 – 5 June 1993
SF	1	(United States)	D. J. Wilson	2.08 m (6 ft 10 in)	104 kg (229 lb)	30 – 2 February 1996
G	4	(China)	Gao Wenze	1.87 m (6 ft 2 in)	90 kg (198 lb)	19 – 22 March 2007
G	5	(China)	Cui Jinming	1.95 m (6 ft 5 in)	90 kg (198 lb)	34 – 11 July 1992
C	6	(China)	Zhao Jiahao	2.11 m (6 ft 11 in)	110 kg (243 lb)	26 – 1 June 2000
PF	9	(United States)	Tyler Cook	2.03 m (6 ft 8 in)	111 kg (245 lb)	29 – 23 September 1997
PG	10	(China)	Cai Linhan	1.90 m (6 ft 3 in)	85 kg (187 lb)	22 – 10 September 2004
G	11	(China)	Jiang Weize	1.82 m (6 ft 0 in)	70 kg (154 lb)	26 – 6 May 2000
PF	13	(China)	Xu Xitong	2.00 m (6 ft 7 in)	100 kg (220 lb)	24 – 22 June 2002
G/F	15	(China)	Wan Menglin	1.93 m (6 ft 4 in)	83 kg (183 lb)	22 – 15 October 2004
G/F	22	(China)	Jia Hao	2.00 m (6 ft 7 in)	93 kg (205 lb)	27 – 5 January 1999
C	24	(China)	Sun Siyao	2.10 m (6 ft 11 in)	111 kg (245 lb)	30 – 13 September 1996
F	27	(China)	Yu Zechen	2.00 m (6 ft 7 in)	92 kg (203 lb)	26 – 22 June 2000
F/C	28	(China)	Du Bochao	2.08 m (6 ft 10 in)	108 kg (238 lb)	27 – 28 August 1999
F	29	(China)	Zhang Hangyuan	1.95 m (6 ft 5 in)	85 kg (187 lb)	20 – 26 June 2006
F/C	32	(China)	Wang Huadong	2.05 m (6 ft 9 in)	115 kg (254 lb)	27 – 26 June 1999
F/C	35	(China)	Liu Yanyu	2.13 m (7 ft 0 in)	97 kg (214 lb)	27 – 21 February 1999
F	37	(China)	Zhao Shuzhou	1.98 m (6 ft 6 in)	97 kg (214 lb)	31 – 12 January 1995
G	99	(China)	Wang Zirui	1.87 m (6 ft 2 in)	80 kg (176 lb)	33 – 28 March 1993

Head coach

- (China) Li Ang

Assistant coach(es)

- (Australia) Guy Molloy
- (China) Gao Junchao

Legend

- (C) Team captain
- Injured

- Roster
Updated: 1 October 2026

== Notable players ==
Note: Flags indicate national team eligibility at FIBA-sanctioned events. Players may hold other non-FIBA nationalities not displayed.

Criteria

To appear in this section a player must have either:

- Set a club record or won an individual award while at the club
- Played at least one official international match for their national team at any time
- Played at least one official NBA match at any time.

Current

- (China) Cui Jinmin (2013–)
- (United States) Dominique Jones (2018–2023, 2024-2025)

Former

- (China) Sun Jun (1994–2005)
- (China) Xue Yuyang (2001–2003)
- (United States) David Vanterpool (1997–1999)
- (United States) Marcus Session (2004)
- (Senegal) Babacar Camara (2005–2008)
- (Venezuela) Leon Rodgers (2008–2010, 2013)
- (United States) Dewarick Spencer (2012–2013)
- (United States) Denzel Bowles (2013–2015)
- (Syria) Michel Madanly (2014–2015)
- (United States) Marcus Williams (2015–2016)
- (Puerto Rico) Peter John Ramos (2015–2016)
- (Nigeria) Josh Akognon (2015–2016)
- (United States) Bob Donewald, Jr. (Head coach, 2016–2017)
- (United States) Jabari Brown (2016–2017)
- (United States) Malcolm Thomas (2016–2017)
- (Iran) Mehdi Kamrani (2016–2017)
- (United States) Von Wafer (2018–2019)
- (United States) Carl Landry (2018–2019)
- (Poland) Maciej Lampe (2018–2019)
