= Guangdong Southern Tigers =

- Leagues: CBA
- Founded: 1993; 33 years ago
- History: Guangdong Hongyuan Southern Tigers (1993–present)
- Arena: Bank of Dongguan Basketball Center
- Capacity: 16,133
- Location: Dongguan, Guangdong, China
- Team colors: Dark blue, white, yellow
- President: Guangdong Hongyuan Group
- Head coach: Nenad Jakovljević
- Championships: 11 (2004, 2005, 2006, 2008, 2009, 2010, 2011, 2013, 2019, 2020, 2021)
- Retired numbers: 4 (4, 8, 9, 15)
Home	Away

Guangdong Southern Tigers
- Traditional Chinese: 廣東宏遠華南虎
- Simplified Chinese: 广东宏远华南虎
Transcriptions
Standard Mandarin
- Hanyu Pinyin: Guǎngdōng Hóngyuǎn Huánánhǔ
Yue: Cantonese
- Jyutping: gwong2 dung1 wang4 jyun5 waa4 naam4 fu2

Guangdong Dongguan Bank
- Traditional Chinese: 廣東東莞銀行
- Simplified Chinese: 广东东莞银行
Transcriptions
Standard Mandarin
- Hanyu Pinyin: Guǎngdōng Dōngguǎn Yínháng

The Guangdong Hongyuan Southern Tigers (Chinese: 广东宏远华南虎) or simply Guangdong Southern Tigers, formerly known as Guangdong Dongguan Bank (Chinese: 广东东莞银行) for sponsorship reasons, are a Chinese professional basketball team owned by the Guangdong Winnerway (Hongyuan) Group. The team is one of the best-performing teams in the Chinese Basketball Association (CBA). The Tigers have won eleven CBA titles, more than any other team in the league. They are also the only team to have qualified for the CBA playoffs in every season since the league launched in 1995. The team plays its home games in Dongguan, Guangdong. Occasionally, for marketing purposes, the team plays some of its home games in Zhongshan, Zhuhai, and other cities in the Pearl River Delta.

Their arch-rivals in the CBA have traditionally been the Beijing Ducks.

== History ==
Established in 1993, the Tigers are the main team (Team 1) of the Guangdong Southern Tigers Basketball Club which is the first privately (non-government) owned professional basketball club in China. Besides Team 1, the club has three reserve teams (youth teams): Team 2 (Guangzhou based), Team 3A (Guangzhou based), and Team 3B (Dongguan based). These reserve teams are jointly administered by the club and by the Guangdong Provincial Sports Bureau.

The Southern Tigers have been CBA members since its inception and are the most successful team in the league. In the 1995–96 season, the Tigers qualified for the finals but lost to Bayi Rockets. After a seven-year wait, they made it to the finals again in 2002–03, and in 2003–04, the team claimed its first ever CBA title. Between 2002–03 and 2012–13, the team reached the CBA finals for eleven consecutive seasons, winning the championship eight times.

The team has also participated in the National Games of China, on behalf of the Guangdong Province. In 2009, they won the first National Games gold medal in basketball for their province. They defended the title in 2013.

== Players ==
=== Current roster ===
Note: Flags indicate national team eligibility at FIBA-sanctioned events. Players may hold other non-FIBA nationalities not displayed.

Guangdong Southern Tigers roster
Players
Coaches

Pos.	No.	Nat.	Name	Ht.	Wt.
SG	1	(United States)	Edmond Sumner (injured)	1.93 m (6 ft 4 in)	89 kg (196 lb)
PG	2	(China)	Xu Jie	1.79 m (5 ft 10 in)	67 kg (148 lb)
G	3	(China)	Hu Mingxuan	1.91 m (6 ft 3 in)	81 kg (179 lb)
PG	5	(China)	Chen Jiazheng	1.95 m (6 ft 5 in)	90 kg (198 lb)
F	6	(China)	Huang Mingyi	2.07 m (6 ft 9 in)	100 kg (220 lb)
F	11	(China)	Zhou Peng	2.06 m (6 ft 9 in)	106 kg (234 lb)
PG	12	(United States)	Kyle Fogg	1.91 m (6 ft 3 in)	85 kg (187 lb)
G	14	(China)	Zhang Wenyi	1.92 m (6 ft 4 in)	95 kg (209 lb)
C	16	(China)	Jiao Boqiao	2.11 m (6 ft 11 in)	117 kg (258 lb)
PG	17	(China)	Zhao Baole	1.86 m (6 ft 1 in)	78 kg (172 lb)
F	21	(China)	Zhang Hao	2.05 m (6 ft 9 in)	97 kg (214 lb)
SF	24	(China)	Cui Yongxi	1.99 m (6 ft 6 in)	93 kg (205 lb)
F	25	(China)	Zhang Haojia	2.00 m (6 ft 7 in)	99 kg (218 lb)
PF	26	(China)	Zhang Jiarui	2.10 m (6 ft 11 in)	90 kg (198 lb)
PF	27	(China)	Yang Tengfei	2.05 m (6 ft 9 in)	98 kg (216 lb)
SF	29	(Croatia)	Luka Božić	2.00 m (6 ft 7 in)	100 kg (220 lb)
PG	33	(China)	Yang Yi	1.76 m (5 ft 9 in)	71 kg (157 lb)
C	35	(Nigeria)	Udoka Azubuike	2.11 m (6 ft 11 in)	122 kg (269 lb)
SF	41	(China)	Wang Hongze	2.07 m (6 ft 9 in)	90 kg (198 lb)

Head coach

- (Serbia) Nenad Jakovljević

Assistant coach(es)

- (Spain) Josep Maria Berrocal
- (China) Ren Junfei
- (China) Ren Junwei

Legend

- (C) Team captain
- Injured

- Roster
Updated: 15 October 2026

=== Retired numbers ===
Guangdong Southern Tigers retired numbers
No.	Nat.	Player	Position	Tenure	Ceremony date
4	(China)	Du Feng	PF	1997–2012	No ceremony
8	(China)	Zhu Fangyu	SF	1999–2017	29 October 2017
15	(United States)	Jason Dixon	C	1998–2001, 2002–2009	23 September 2009

== Season-by-season record ==
Season	Regular season				Playoffs
Season	Won	Lost	Win%	Pos.	Playoffs
1995–96	18	4	.818	2nd	Won semifinals vs. Liaoning Dinosaurs (2–0); Lost CBA finals vs. Bayi Rockets (0–2)
1996–97	13	9	.591	4th	Won quarterfinals vs. Shanghai Sharks (2–0); Lost semifinals vs. Bayi Rockets (0–2)
1997–98	10	12	.455	7th	Lost quarterfinals vs. Liaoning Dinosaurs (1–2)
1998–99	13	9	.591	3rd	Won quarterfinals vs. Shanghai Sharks (2–1); Lost semifinals vs. Liaoning Dinosaurs (0–3)
1999–00	15	7	.682	2nd	Won quarterfinals vs. Liaoning Dinosaurs (2–1); Lost semifinals vs. Shanghai Sharks (1–3)
2000–01	12	10	.545	6th	Lost quarterfinals vs. Beijing Ducks (0–2)
2001–02	12	12	.500	7th	Lost quarterfinals vs. Shanghai Sharks (0–3)
2002–03	23	3	.885	1st	Won quarterfinals vs. Shandong Lions (3–0); Won semifinals vs. Beijing Ducks (3–0); Lost CBA finals vs. Bayi Rockets (1–3)
2003–04	19	3	.864	1st	Won quarterfinals vs. Shaanxi Kylins (2–0); Won semifinals vs. Jilin Northeast Tigers (2–1); Won CBA finals vs. Bayi Rockets (3–1)
2004–05	30	8	.789	2nd	Won South Division semifinals vs. Bayi Rockets (2–0); Won South Division finals vs. Jiangsu Dragons (2–0); Won quarterfinals vs. Jilin Northeast Tigers (2–0); Won semifinals vs. Bayi Rockets (3–0); Won CBA finals vs. Jiangsu Dragons (3–2)
2005–06	37	5	.881	1st	Won quarterfinals vs. Jilin Northeast Tigers (3–0); Won semifinals vs. Jiangsu Dragons (3–0); Won CBA finals vs. Bayi Rockets (4–1)
2006–07	26	4	.867	1st	Won quarterfinals vs. Shanghai Sharks (3–0); Won semifinals vs. Jiangsu Dragons (3–0); Lost CBA finals vs. Bayi Rockets (1–4)
2007–08	26	4	.867	1st	Won quarterfinals vs. Zhejiang Lions (3–0); Won semifinals vs. Dongguan Leopards (3–0); Won CBA finals vs. Liaoning Dinosaurs (4–1)
2008–09	45	5	.900	1st	Won quarterfinals vs. Shandong Lions (3–0); Won semifinals vs. Dongguan Leopards (3–0); Won CBA finals vs. Xinjiang Flying Tigers (4–1)
2009–10	32	2	.941	1st	Won quarterfinals vs. Bayi Rockets (3–0); Won semifinals vs. Shanghai Sharks (3–1); Won CBA finals vs. Xinjiang Flying Tigers (4–1)
2010–11	25	7	.781	2nd	Won quarterfinals vs. Bayi Rockets (3–0); Won semifinals vs. Dongguan Leopards (3–0); Won CBA finals vs. Xinjiang Flying Tigers (4–2)
2011–12	27	5	.844	1st	Won quarterfinals vs. Fujian Xunxing (3–0); Won semifinals vs. Xinjiang Flying Tigers (3–0); Lost CBA finals vs. Beijing Ducks (1–4)
2012–13	28	4	.875	1st	Won quarterfinals vs. Zhejiang Golden Bulls (3–0); Won semifinals vs. Xinjiang Flying Tigers (3–0); Won CBA finals vs. Shandong Lions (4–0)
2013–14	30	4	.882	1st	Won quarterfinals vs. Shanghai Sharks (3–0); Lost semifinals vs. Beijing Ducks (2–3)
2014–15	34	4	.895	1st	Won quarterfinals vs. Shenzhen Leopards (3–1); Lost semifinals vs. Beijing Ducks (1–3)
2015–16	28	10	.737	4th	Won quarterfinals vs. Shandong Golden Stars (3–0); Lost semifinals vs. Liaoning Flying Leopards (1–3)
2016–17	30	8	.789	2nd	Won quarterfinals vs. Sichuan Blue Whales (3–0); Won semifinals vs. Shenzhen Leopards (4–1); Lost CBA finals vs. Xinjiang Flying Tigers (0–4)
2017–18	28	10	.737	3rd	Won quarterfinals vs. Xinjiang Flying Tigers (3–1); Lost semifinals vs. Liaoning Flying Leopards (1–4)
2018–19	42	4	.913	1st	Won quarterfinals vs. Jiangsu Dragons (3–0); Won semifinals vs. Shenzhen Leopards (4–0); Won CBA finals vs. Xinjiang Flying Tigers (4–0)
2019–20	44	2	.957	1st	Won quarterfinals vs. Qingdao Eagles (one match only); Won semifinals vs. Beijing Ducks (2–1); Won CBA finals vs. Liaoning Flying Leopards (2–1)
2020–21	46	6	.885	1st	Won quarterfinals vs. Beijing Ducks (one match only); Won semifinals vs. Shandong Heroes (2–0); Won CBA finals vs. Liaoning Flying Leopards (2–1)
2021–22	26	12	.684	5th	Won first round vs. Tianjin Pioneers (2–0); Won quarterfinals vs. Zhejiang Golden Bulls (2–0); Lost semifinals vs. Liaoning Flying Leopards (0–3)
2022–23	33	9	.786	2nd	Lost quarterfinals vs. Zhejiang Lions (1–2)
2023–24	37	15	.712	4th	Won quarterfinals vs. Zhejiang Lions (3–1); Lost semifinals vs. Liaoning Flying Leopards (2–3)
2024–25	31	15	.674	7th	Won first round vs. Shanghai Sharks (2–1); Lost quarterfinals vs. Shanxi Loongs (0–3)
2025–26	27	15	.643	5th	Won first round vs. Guangzhou Loong Lions (2–1); Lost quarterfinals vs. Beijing Ducks (1–2)

== In popular culture ==
During a December 2011 episode of Inside the NBA, Shaquille O'Neal mentioned the Tigers during their "Who He Play For?" sketch, where he guessed Aaron Brooks had now been playing for the team. The moment and reaction of "Ni Hao! Ni Hao!" (lit. 'hello' in Mandarin Chinese) became a popular meme, particularly when a new NBA free agent is expected to become a journeyman (examples being Ben Simmons, Eric Bledsoe, and Jordan Poole).

== Honours ==
- Chinese Basketball Association
  - Playoffs champions (11): 2003–04, 2004–05, 2005–06, 2007–08, 2008–09, 2009–10, 2010–11, 2012–13, 2018–19, 2019–20, 2020–21
  - Playoffs runners-up (5): 1995–96, 2002–03, 2006–07, 2011–12, 2016–17
  - Regular season champions (14): 2002–03, 2003–04, 2005–06 (South Division), 2006–07, 2007–08, 2008–09, 2009–10, 2011–12, 2012–13, 2013–14, 2014–15, 2018–19, 2019–20, 2020–21
  - Regular season runners-up (6): 1995–96, 1999–2000, 2004–05 (South Division), 2010–11, 2016–17, 2022–23
- FIBA Asia Champions Cup
  - Third place: 1996
- National Club Championship
  - Winners: 1998
- Asian Club Championship
  - Winners: 2012
- National Men's Basketball Group B League
  - Winners: 1995
