= Jiangsu Dragons =

Chinese basketball team

- League: CBA
- Founded: 1995; 31 years ago
- History: Jiangsu Daye Dragons (1995–1996); Jiangsu Nanjing Steel Dragons (1996–2015); Jiangsu Dragons Kentier (2015–present)
- Arena: Suzhou Sports Center
- Capacity: 6,500
- Location: Suzhou, Jiangsu, China
- Team colors: Black, White, Red
- Head coach: Yi Li
- Championships: None
| Home | Away |

Jiangsu Dragons Kentier (Chinese: 江苏龙肯帝亚), also known as Jiangsu Dragons or Jiangsu Kentier, are a Chinese professional basketball team in the Southern Division of the Chinese Basketball Association, based in Nanjing, Jiangsu.

== History ==
In the 2004–05 season, the Jiangsu Dragons finished in first place in the South Division, defeated the Xinjiang Flying Tigers in the quarter-finals and the Yunnan Bulls in the semi-finals, but lost to the Guangdong Southern Tigers in the Finals.

== Current roster ==
Note: Flags indicate national team eligibility at FIBA-sanctioned events. Players may hold other non-FIBA nationalities not displayed.

Jiangsu Dragons roster
Players
Coaches

| Pos. | No. | Nat. | Name | Ht. | Wt. |
|---|---|---|---|---|---|
| PG | 1 | (China) | Cai Yuhang | 1.90 m (6 ft 3 in) | 82 kg (181 lb) |
| PG | 4 | (China) | Cao Zhihao | 1.91 m (6 ft 3 in) | 84 kg (185 lb) |
| PG | 5 | (China) | Xiao Kai | 1.81 m (5 ft 11 in) | 79 kg (174 lb) |
| F/C | 7 | (United States) | James Thompson | 2.08 m (6 ft 10 in) | 109 kg (240 lb) |
| F/C | 9 | (China) | Zeng Fanri | 2.05 m (6 ft 9 in) | 115 kg (254 lb) |
| PF | 10 | (China) | Ni Yongkang | 2.02 m (6 ft 8 in) | 94 kg (207 lb) |
| G | 13 | (China) | Liu Zexi | 1.90 m (6 ft 3 in) | 83 kg (183 lb) |
| F | 15 | (China) | Wu Chao | 2.12 m (6 ft 11 in) | 91 kg (201 lb) |
| PF | 17 | (China) | Li Chengyao | 2.05 m (6 ft 9 in) | 95 kg (209 lb) |
| F/C | 18 | (China) | Jiang Haoran | 2.05 m (6 ft 9 in) | 107 kg (236 lb) |
| PG | 19 | (China) | Liu Zhengqing | 1.95 m (6 ft 5 in) | 92 kg (203 lb) |
| G/F | 23 | (China) | Yan Shi | 1.95 m (6 ft 5 in) | 83 kg (183 lb) |
| G | 25 | (Canada) | Kadre Gray | 1.85 m (6 ft 1 in) | 86 kg (190 lb) |
| SG | 26 | (China) | Pang Zhenglin | 1.83 m (6 ft 0 in) | 76 kg (168 lb) |
| F/C | 33 | (China) | Li Lutong | 2.13 m (7 ft 0 in) | 88 kg (194 lb) |
| SF | 34 | (China) | Wu Yujia | 2.00 m (6 ft 7 in) | 82 kg (181 lb) |
| SF | 44 | (United States) | Feron Hunt | 2.03 m (6 ft 8 in) | 88 kg (194 lb) |
| F | 50 | (China) | Zheng Qilong | 2.05 m (6 ft 9 in) | 96 kg (212 lb) |
| PF | 77 | (China) | Wang Ximing | 2.04 m (6 ft 8 in) | 100 kg (220 lb) |
| PG | 00 | (China) | Wang Yuxiang | 1.94 m (6 ft 4 in) | 87 kg (192 lb) |

Head coach

- (China) Yi Li

Assistant coach(es)

- (Slovenia) Memi Bečirovič

Legend

- (C) Team captain
- Injured

- Roster
Updated: September 30, 2026

== Seasons ==
| Season | Pos. | W | L | Pct. | Playoffs |
|---|---|---|---|---|---|
Jiangsu Dragons
| 2014–15 | 14th | 11 | 27 | .289 | – |
| 2015–16 | 11th | 18 | 20 | .474 | – |

== Notable players ==
Note: Flags indicate national team eligibility at FIBA-sanctioned events. Players may hold other non-FIBA nationalities not displayed.

Criteria

To appear in this section a player must have either:

- Set a club record or won an individual award while at the club
- Played at least one official international match for their national team at any time
- Played at least one official NBA match at any time.

- (China) Hu Weidong (1985–2005)
- (China) Hu Xuefeng (1999–2017)
- (United States) Chris Andersen (1999–2000)
- (United States) Alex Scales (2001–2002)
- (United States) Chris Herren (2003–2004)
- (China) Yi Li (2004–present)
- (United States) Jelani McCoy (2004–2005)
- (United States) Brian Butch (2008)
- (United States) Donnell Harvey (2008–2009)
- (United States) Jameel Watkins (2008–2009)
- (United States) Ricky Davis (2010)
- (France) Jérôme Moïso (2010–2011)
- (United States) Antoine Wright (2010–2011)
- (Netherlands) Dan Gadzuric (2011)
- (United States) Mardy Collins (2011)
- (United States) Marcus Williams (2011–2012)
- (United States) / (Lebanon) Jackson Vroman (2011–2012)
- (United States) Mike Harris (2012–2013)
- (United States) Garret Siler (2012–2013)
- (United States) Marcus Haislip (2013–2014)
- (United States) Toney Douglas (2014–2015)
- (United States) Chris Singleton (2014–2015)
- (United States) Arnett Moultrie (2014–2015)
- (United States) MarShon Brooks (2015–2018)
- (United States) Greg Oden (2015–2016)
- (United States) Will McDonald (2015, 2016–2017)
- (Jamaica) Samardo Samuels (2016–2017)
- (Serbia) Miroslav Raduljica (2017–2020)
- (United States) Antonio Blakeney (2023–2024)
