= Guangzhou Loong Lions =

Guangzhou Loong Lions 广州龙狮
- League: CBA
- Founded: 2000; 26 years ago
- History: Shaanxi Gaitianli Kylins (2000–2010); Foshan Dralions (2010–2014); Foshan Long-Lions (2014–2016); Guangzhou Long-Lions (2016–2019); Guangzhou Loong Lions (2019–present)
- Arena: Tianhe Gymnasium
- Capacity: 7,600
- Location: Guangzhou, Guangdong, China
- Team colors: Red, navy, white
- Head coach: Doron Perkins
- Championships: None
| Home | Away | Third |

Guangzhou Loong Lions
- Traditional Chinese: 時代中國廣州龍獅籃球隊
- Simplified Chinese: 时代中国广州龙狮篮球队
Transcriptions
Standard Mandarin
- Hanyu Pinyin: Shídài Zhōngguó Guǎngzhōu Lóng Shī Lánqiú Duì
Yue: Cantonese
- Jyutping: si4 doi6 zung1 gwok3 gwong2 zau1 lung4 si1 laam4 kau4 deoi2

Guangzhou Long Lions
- Traditional Chinese: 廣州龍獅
- Simplified Chinese: 广州龙狮
Transcriptions
Standard Mandarin
- Hanyu Pinyin: Guǎngzhōu Lóngshī
Yue: Cantonese
- Jyutping: gwong2 zau1 lung4 si1

The Guangzhou Loong Lions (simplified Chinese: 广州龙狮; traditional Chinese: 廣州龍獅; pinyin: Guǎngzhōu Lóng Shī) are a Chinese professional basketball team based in Guangzhou, Guangdong. They play in the Southern Division of the Chinese Basketball Association (CBA).

== History ==
The team was founded in November 2000 as Shaanxi Gaitianli Kylins by the Xi'an Dongsheng Group. In August 2001, they won the "B" league championship, and were promoted to the CBA. In the 2004–05 season, the Shaanxi Kylins finished in fifth place in the North Division, and were out of the playoffs. In 2005–06, they finished sixth, and were once again out of the playoffs. The team was scheduled to participate in the 2008 season of the International Basketball League (IBL). They were replaced by the Shanxi Brave Dragons.

In 2010, the Shaanxi Kylins moved from Xi'an to Foshan, and renamed themselves the Foshan Dralions. The club opted to start rendering its English name as "Long-Lions" rather than "Dralions" before the start of the 2014–15 season.

In 2016, the Foshan Long-Lions moved from Foshan to Guangzhou, and renamed themselves the Guangzhou Long-Lions. In 2017, the Nanhai Long-Lions were founded as the affiliate team. The team has also competed in the ASEAN Basketball League (ABL). Their youth squad currently competes in The Asian Tournament.

== Players ==
=== Current roster ===
Note: Flags indicate national team eligibility at FIBA-sanctioned events. Players may hold other non-FIBA nationalities not displayed.

Guangzhou Loong Lions roster
Players
Coaches

| Pos. | No. | Nat. | Name | Ht. | Wt. |
|---|---|---|---|---|---|
| F | 1 | (China) | Wang Leyang | 1.99 m (6 ft 6 in) | 95 kg (209 lb) |
| PG | 2 | (China) | Sun Yonghao | 1.82 m (6 ft 0 in) | 72 kg (159 lb) |
| G | 3 | (China) | Zhang Huafei | 1.93 m (6 ft 4 in) | 80 kg (176 lb) |
| G | 4 | (United States) | Shane Gatling | 1.88 m (6 ft 2 in) | 85 kg (187 lb) |
| SF | 5 | (China) | Yuan Zhaoyao | 2.00 m (6 ft 7 in) | 96 kg (212 lb) |
| G/F | 7 | (China) | Du Zhibo | 1.94 m (6 ft 4 in) | 90 kg (198 lb) |
| PG | 8 | (China) | Xiu Zhenfeng | 1.96 m (6 ft 5 in) | 76 kg (168 lb) |
| G | 10 | (Chinese Taipei) | Sung Hsin-hao | 1.85 m (6 ft 1 in) | 80 kg (176 lb) |
| SG | 11 | (China) | Liu Yancheng | 1.97 m (6 ft 6 in) | 97 kg (214 lb) |
| PG | 12 | (China) | Zhang Wenjie | 1.91 m (6 ft 3 in) | 85 kg (187 lb) |
| F/C | 13 | (China) | Lu Jiahui | 2.08 m (6 ft 10 in) | 105 kg (231 lb) |
| G/F | 15 | (China) | Wan Mengfei | 1.92 m (6 ft 4 in) | 85 kg (187 lb) |
| C | 19 | (China) | Xu Xin | 2.26 m (7 ft 5 in) | 122 kg (269 lb) |
| G | 22 | (United States) | Tahjere McCall | 1.96 m (6 ft 5 in) | 86 kg (190 lb) |
| PF | 23 | (China) | Chen Guohao | 2.02 m (6 ft 8 in) | 102 kg (225 lb) |
| F/C | 26 | (China) | Gao Yukun | 2.08 m (6 ft 10 in) | 99 kg (218 lb) |
| C | 34 | (United States) | Moses Brown | 2.18 m (7 ft 2 in) | 117 kg (258 lb) |
| G | 37 | (China) | Feng Xianjun | 1.96 m (6 ft 5 in) | 85 kg (187 lb) |
| PG | 55 | (China) | Lin Shaoyang | 1.88 m (6 ft 2 in) | 75 kg (165 lb) |
| F/C | 66 | (China) | Zhang Xinyu | 2.07 m (6 ft 9 in) | 114 kg (251 lb) |

Head coach

- (United States) Doron Perkins

Assistant coach(es)

- (United States) Sammy Gelfand
- (China) Shi Jun
- (China) Tong Jiajun

Legend

- (C) Team captain
- Injured

- Roster
Updated: 1 October 2026

=== Notable players ===
- (Spain) (United States) Lorenzo Brown
- (Chinese Taipei) (United States) Jeremy Lin

== Games against NBA teams ==
On 2 October 2017, the team played a pre-season game with the Washington Wizards at the Capital One Arena, which made them the second CBA club to play against the National Basketball Association club.

2 October 2017

Boxscore

| Guangzhou Long-Lions (China) | 96–126 | (United States) Washington Wizards |

Capital One Arena, Washington

12 October 2018

Boxscore

| Guangzhou Long-Lions (China) | 111–140 | (United States) Washington Wizards |

Capital One Arena, Washington

8 October 2019

Boxscore

| Guangzhou Loong Lions (China) | 86–144 | (United States) Philadelphia 76ers |

Wells Fargo Center, Philadelphia

6 October 2025

Boxscore

| Guangzhou Loong Lions (China) | 88–119 | (United States) San Antonio Spurs |

Frost Bank Center, San Antonio

9 October 2025

Boxscore

| Guangzhou Loong Lions (China) | 95–142 | (United States) Los Angeles Clippers |

Frontwave Arena, Oceanside

13 October 2025

Boxscore

| Guangzhou Loong Lions (China) | 74–134 | (United States) Minnesota Timberwolves |

Target Center, Minneapolis

== Honours ==
Seri Mutiara Cup 2016 Champion

Seri Mutiara Cup 2017 (6th place)
