= 2011 CBA Playoffs =

The 2011 CBA Playoffs is the postseason for the Chinese Basketball Association's 2010–11 season. The playoffs started on March 23, 2011 with CCTV-5, and many local channels broadcasting the games in China. Eight teams qualified for the playoffs, all seeded 1 to 8 in a tournament bracket, with first and second round in a best-of-five format, and a final in a best-of-seven format.

== Playoff qualifying ==
Seed	Team	Wins	Clinched Playoff berth	Fixed seed ranking
1	Xinjiang Flying Tigers	31	February 16	March 2
2	Guangdong Southern Tigers	25	February 25	March 11^{+}
3	Dongguan Leopards	25	February 20	March 11^{+}
4	Jiangsu Dragons	20	March 4	March 6
5	Zhejiang Cyclone	19	March 6	March 9
6	Zhejiang Lions	18	March 9	March 11^{+}
7	Bayi Rockets	17	March 9	March 11^{+}
8	Beijing Ducks	16	March 6	March 11^{+}

- Note +: March 11 was the last matchday of regular season.

== Bracket ==
Teams in bold advanced to the next round. The numbers to the left of each team indicate the team's seeding in regular season, and the numbers to the right indicate the number of games the team won in that round. Home court advantage belongs to the team with the better regular season record; teams enjoying the home advantage are shown in italics.

Quarterfinals; Best of 5
1	**Xinjiang Flying Tigers**	**3**
8	Beijing Ducks	0
4	**Jiangsu Dragons**	**3**
5	Zhejiang Cyclone	0
3	**Dongguan Leopards**	**3**
6	Zhejiang Lions	1
2	**Guangdong Southern Tigers**	**3**
7	Bayi Rockets	0

Semifinals; Best of 5
1	**Xinjiang Flying Tigers**	**3**
4	Jiangsu Dragons	0
3	Dongguan Leopards	0
2	**Guangdong Southern Tigers**	**3**

Finals; Best of 7
1	Xinjiang Flying Tigers	2
2	**Guangdong Southern Tigers**	**4**

== Match details ==
All times are in China standard time (UTC+8)

=== Quarterfinals ===
==== (1) Xinjiang Flying Tigers vs. (8) Beijing Ducks ====
BTV6

March 23
19:30

Report

Beijing Ducks	78–**112**	**Xinjiang Flying Tigers**
Scoring by quarter: 23-31, 20-23, 12-26, 23-32
Pts: Randolph Morris, Zaid Abbaas 20; Rebs: Randolph Morris 12; Asts: 4 players 2		Pts: Quincy Douby 38; Rebs: Mengke Bateer 10; Asts: Quincy Douby, Zhang Qingpeng 5

Shougang Gymnasium, Beijing
Referees:
Ban Qi
Wen Keming
Liang Bin

XJTV

March 25
20:00

Report

**Xinjiang Flying Tigers**	**104**–98	Beijing Ducks
Scoring by quarter: 27-22, 10-24, 31-33, 35-19
Pts: Quincy Douby 40; Rebs: James Singleton 9 Asts: Zhang Qingpeng, Mawlan Tursun 3		Pts: Zaid Abbaas 26; Rebs: Zaid Abbaas 16; Asts: Randolph Morris, Lee Hsueh-lin 5

Hongshan Arena, Ürümqi
Referees:
Wang Zhuoping
He Jingzhou
Zhang Peng

XJTV

March 27
20:00

Report

**Xinjiang Flying Tigers**	**102**–87	Beijing Ducks
Scoring by quarter: 17-21, 20-21, 35-25, 30-20
Pts: Quincy Douby 33; Rebs: Mengke Bateer 10; Asts: Quincy Douby 11		Pts: Chen Lei 26; Rebs: Zaid Abbaas 15; Asts: Randolph Morris 5
**Xinjiang win series, 3–0**

Hongshan Arena, Ürümqi
Referees:
Yu Bin
Song Xiaojing
Duan Zhu

==== (2) Guangdong Southern Tigers vs. (7) Bayi Rockets ====
NBTV
CCTV-5

March 23
19:30

Report

Bayi Rockets	89–**95**	**Guangdong Southern Tigers**
Scoring by quarter: 18-28, 25-20, 26-25, 20-22
Pts: Wang Zhizhi 30; Rebs: Xu Zhonghao 8 Asts: Zhang Bo 7		Pts: Lester Hudson, Marcus Haislip 15; Rebs: Su Wei 10; Asts: Lester Hudson 6

Youngor Arena, Ningbo
Referees:
Yang Maogong
Qiao Longsheng
Xia Chun

EuroSoccer

March 25
19:30

Report

**Guangdong Southern Tigers**	**121**–97	Bayi Rockets
Scoring by quarter: 28-30, 29-21, 28-29, 36-17
Pts: Lester Hudson 28; Rebs: Lester Hudson 9 Asts: Lester Hudson, Chen Jianghua 5		Pts: Han Shuo 23; Rebs: Han Shuo, Wang Zhizhi 6 Asts: 3 players 3

Dongguan Arena, Dongguan
Referees:
Ma Lijun
Wang Mei
Jiang Zhiyuan

GDTV Sports

March 27
19:30

Report

**Guangdong Southern Tigers**	**105**–82	Bayi Rockets
Scoring by quarter: 34-17, 14-18, 27-29, 30-18
Pts: Zhou Peng 17; Rebs: Chen Jianghua 9 Asts: Liu Xiaoyu 6		Pts: Wang Lei 16; Rebs: Wang Zhizhi 8 Asts: 3 players 2
**Guangdong win series, 3–0**

Dongguan Arena, Dongguan
Referees:
Song Yanping
Wang Xiaochun
Du Xiyuan

==== (3) Dongguan Leopards vs. (6) Zhejiang Lions ====
HZTV

March 23
19:30

Report

**Zhejiang Lions**	**120**–103	Dongguan Leopards
Scoring by quarter: 35-27, 16-28, 33-23, 36-25
Pts: Peter Ramos 32; Rebs: Peter Ramos 15; Asts: Lin Chih-Chieh, Wang Bo 5		Pts: Josh Akognon 46; Rebs: Zhang Kai, Courtney Sims 7 Asts: Qiu Biao 4

Hangzhou Gymnasium, Hangzhou
Referees:
Song Yanping
He Jingzhou
Yang Hongfeng

GDTV Sports

March 25
19:30

Report

**Dongguan Leopards**	**100**–99	Zhejiang Lions
Scoring by quarter: 24-17, 18-19, 36-32, 22-31
Pts: Josh Akognon 25; Rebs: Zhang Kai 11; Asts: Zhang Kai 2		Pts: Peter Ramos, Lin Chih-Chieh 27; Rebs: Peter Ramos 10; Asts: Lin Chih-Chieh 4

Dalang Arena, Dongguan
Referees:
Wu Minhua
Zheng Jun
Duan Zhu

GDTV Sports
(Chongqing)
CCTV-5

March 27
19:30

Report

**Dongguan Leopards**	**94**–92	Zhejiang Lions
Scoring by quarter: 21-19, 17-22, 29-34, 27-17
Pts: Josh Akognon, Gu Quan 22; Rebs: Courtney Sims 9 Asts: Chen Hsin-An 5		Pts: Peter Ramos 24; Rebs: Peter Ramos 16; Asts: Lin Chih-Chieh, Walker Russell 6

Dalang Arena, Dongguan
Referees:
Yang Maogong
Wang Mei
Jiang Zhiyuan

HZTV
CCTV-5

March 30
19:30

Report

Zhejiang Lions	89–**97**	**Dongguan Leopards**
Scoring by quarter: 21-20, 21-20, 28-25, 19-32
Pts: Peter Ramos 23; Rebs: Wang Bo 10; Asts: Walker Russell 5		Pts: Josh Akognon 43; Rebs: Courtney Sims 15; Asts: 3 players 2
**Dongguan win series, 3–1**

Hangzhou Gymnasium, Hangzhou
Referees:
Ma Lijun
Qiao Longsheng
Du Xiyuan

==== (4) Jiangsu Dragons vs. (5) Zhejiang Cyclone ====
HZTV

March 23
19:30

Report

Zhejiang Cyclone	95–**100** (OT)	**Jiangsu Dragons**
Scoring by quarter: 19-27, 16-18, 28-21, 22-29, Overtime: 10-15
Pts: Marcus Williams 33; Rebs: Josh Boone 14; Asts: Marcus Williams 5		Pts: Antoine Wright, Yi Li 26; Rebs: Antoine Wright, Jérôme Moïso 14; Asts: Yang Li 5

Yiwu Gymnasium, Yiwu
Referees:
Ma Lijun
Zheng Jun
Jiang Zhiyuan

JSports

March 25
19:30

Report

**Jiangsu Dragons**	**75**–65	Zhejiang Cyclone
Scoring by quarter: 18-18, 19-16, 11-11, 27-20
Pts: Antoine Wright 20; Rebs: Jérôme Moïso 15; Asts: Antoine Wright 4		Pts: Cao Fei 20; Rebs: Josh Boone 12; Asts: Marcus Williams 3

Nangang Gymnasium, Nanjing
Referees:
Yang Maogong
Wang Xiaochun
Du Xiyuan

JSports

March 27
19:30

Report

**Jiangsu Dragons**	**96**–94	Zhejiang Cyclone
Scoring by quarter: 20-21, 20-23, 27-21, 29-29
Pts: Antoine Wright 31; Rebs: Jérôme Moïso 14; Asts: Yang Li 4		Pts: Marcus Williams 36; Rebs: Ding Jinhui 12; Asts: Cao Fei 6
**Jiangsu win series, 3–0**

Nangang Gymnasium, Nanjing
Referees:
Ma Lijun
Qiao Longsheng
Xia Chun

=== Semifinals ===
==== (1) Xinjiang Flying Tigers vs. (4) Jiangsu Dragons ====
JSports

April 3
19:30

Report

Jiangsu Dragons	78–**94**	**Xinjiang Flying Tigers**
Scoring by quarter: 25-26, 16-24, 17-22, 20-22
Pts: Antoine Wright 21; Rebs: Jérôme Moïso 12; Asts: 4 players 2		Pts: Quincy Douby 25; Rebs: Mengke Bateer 12; Asts: Mengke Bateer 7

Nangang Gymnasium, Nanjing
Referees:
(Argentina) Juan José Fernández
(Lithuania) Tomas Jasevicius
Wang Mei

XJTV

April 6
20:00

Report

**Xinjiang Flying Tigers**	**112**–91	Jiangsu Dragons
Scoring by quarter: 31-16, 31-30, 22-22, 28-23
Pts: Quincy Douby 41; Rebs: Mengke Bateer 10; Asts: Mengke Bateer 8		Pts: Antoine Wright, Yi Li 19; Rebs: Jérôme Moïso 6 Asts: Yi Li 3

Hongshan Arena, Ürümqi
Referees:
(Australia) Scott Jason Butler
(Ukraine) Borys Shulga
Yang Hongfeng

XJTV

April 8
20:00

Report

**Xinjiang Flying Tigers**	**111**–97	Jiangsu Dragons
Scoring by quarter: 33-24, 23-21, 26-28, 29-24
Pts: Quincy Douby 35; Rebs: James Singleton 14; Asts: Quincy Douby 7		Pts: Yi Li 31; Rebs: Jérôme Moïso 10; Asts: Yang Li 5
**Xinjiang win series, 3–0**

Hongshan Arena, Ürümqi
Referees:
(Australia) Scott Jason Butler
(Ukraine) Borys Shulga
Song Xiaojing

==== (2) Guangdong Southern Tigers vs. (3) Dongguan Leopards ====
GDTV Sports

April 3
19:30

Report

Dongguan Leopards	88–**146**	**Guangdong Southern Tigers**
Scoring by quarter: 21-30, 13-36, 33-38, 21-42
Pts: Josh Akognon 30; Rebs: Qiu Biao 7 Asts: Qiu Biao 3		Pts: Zhou Peng 27; Rebs: Lester Hudson, Su Wei 8 Asts: Chen Jianghua 7

Dalang Arena, Dongguan
Referees:
(Australia) Scott Jason Butler
(Ukraine) Borys Shulga
Xia Chun

GDTV Sports
CCTV-5

April 6
19:30

Report

**Guangdong Southern Tigers**	**123**–115	Dongguan Leopards
Scoring by quarter: 30-23, 41-34, 30-33, 22-25
Pts: Lester Hudson 30; Rebs: Zhou Peng 12; Asts: Lester Hudson 6		Pts: Josh Akognon 31; Rebs: Courtney Sims 11; Asts: Josh Akognon 3

Dongguan Arena, Dongguan
Referees:
(Argentina) Juan José Fernández
(Lithuania) Tomas Jasevicius
Zheng Jun

GDTV Sports
CCTV-5

April 8
19:30

Report

**Guangdong Southern Tigers**	**115**–111	Dongguan Leopards
Scoring by quarter: 22-23, 36-33, 37-22, 20-33
Pts: Lester Hudson 41; Rebs: Dong Hanlin 11; Asts: Zhou Peng, Lester Hudson 3		Pts: Josh Akognon 38; Rebs: Courtney Sims, Zhang Kai 11; Asts: Qiu Biao, Meng Duo 3
**Guangdong win series, 3–0**

Dongguan Arena, Dongguan
Referees:
(Argentina) Juan José Fernández
(Lithuania) Tomas Jasevicius
He Jingzhou

=== CBA Finals: (1) Xinjiang Flying Tigers vs. (2) Guangdong Southern Tigers ===
GDTV Sports
CCTV-5

April 15
19:45

Report

Guangdong Southern Tigers	92–**100**	**Xinjiang Flying Tigers**
Scoring by quarter: 29-25, 13-16, 25-33, 25-26
Pts: Wang Shipeng 22; Rebs: Marcus Haislip 10; Asts: Lester Hudson 5		Pts: Quincy Douby 53; Rebs: Quincy Douby 11; Asts: Xiralijan Muhtar 3

Dongguan Arena, Dongguan
Referees:
(United States) Anthony Dewayne Jordan
(Argentina) Juan Jose Fernandez
Qiao Longsheng

XJTV
CCTV-5

April 17
19:45

Report

Xinjiang Flying Tigers	91–**96**	**Guangdong Southern Tigers**
Scoring by quarter: 23-22, 17-14, 29-20, 22-40
Pts: Quincy Douby 36; Rebs: James Singleton 9 Asts: 3 players 2		Pts: Wang Shipeng 32; Rebs: Zhu Fangyu, Su Wei 9 Asts: Lester Hudson 7

Hongshan Arena, Ürümqi
Referees:
(United States) Anthony Dewayne Jordan
(Argentina) Juan Jose Fernandez
Wen Keming

XJTV
CCTV-5

April 20
19:45

Report

**Xinjiang Flying Tigers**	**118**–85	Guangdong Southern Tigers
Scoring by quarter: 30-25, 31-24, 29-17, 28-19
Pts: Quincy Douby 28; Rebs: James Singleton 8 Asts: Xiralijan Muhtar 5		Pts: Wang Shipeng 19; Rebs: Su Wei 13; Asts: Lester Hudson 5

Hongshan Arena, Ürümqi
Referees:
(United States) Anthony Dewayne Jordan
(Argentina) Juan Jose Fernandez
Du Xiyuan

GDTV Sports
CCTV-5

April 22
19:45

Report

**Guangdong Southern Tigers**	**122**–87	Xinjiang Flying Tigers
Scoring by quarter: 35-20, 31-15, 33-27, 23-25
Pts: Lester Hudson 25; Rebs: Lester Hudson 9 Asts: Chen Jianghua 5		Pts: Quincy Douby 31; Rebs: James Singleton 6 Asts: Xiralijan, Zhang Q.P. 5

Dongguan Arena, Dongguan
Referees:
(United States) Anthony Dewayne Jordan
(Argentina) Juan Jose Fernandez
Wang Mei

GDTV Sports
CCTV-5

April 24
19:45

Report

**Guangdong Southern Tigers**	**110**–104	Xinjiang Flying Tigers
Scoring by quarter: 25-20, 25-35, 36-21, 24-28
Pts: Wang Shipeng 29; Rebs: Lester Hudson, Zhu Fangyu 7 Asts: Lester Hudson 8		Pts: James Singleton 33; Rebs: James Singleton 12; Asts: James Singleton, Zhang Q.P. 3

Dongguan Arena, Dongguan
Referees:
(United States) Anthony Dewayne Jordan
(United Kingdom) George Valentine
Qiao Longsheng

XJTV
CCTV-5

April 27
19:45

Report

Xinjiang Flying Tigers	93–**103**	**Guangdong Southern Tigers**
Pts: Quincy Douby 35; Rebs: Singleton, Bateer 10; Asts: Quincy Douby, Xiralijan 4		Pts: Marcus Haislip 35; Rebs: Su Wei 10; Asts: Lester Hudson 6
**Guangdong win CBA Finals, 4-2**

Hongshan Arena, Ürümqi
Referees:
(United States) Anthony Dewayne Jordan
(Argentina) Juan Jose Fernandez
Song Yanping
