= Chinese Basketball Association All-Star Game =

Annual Chinese Basketball Association event

CBA All-Star Game
- Status: Active
- Frequency: Annually
- Inaugurated: 1996
- Most recent: 2025
- Organizer: Chinese Basketball Association

The CBA All-Star Game is an annual basketball event in China, organised by the Chinese Basketball Association. It is held annually during the mid-season.

== History ==
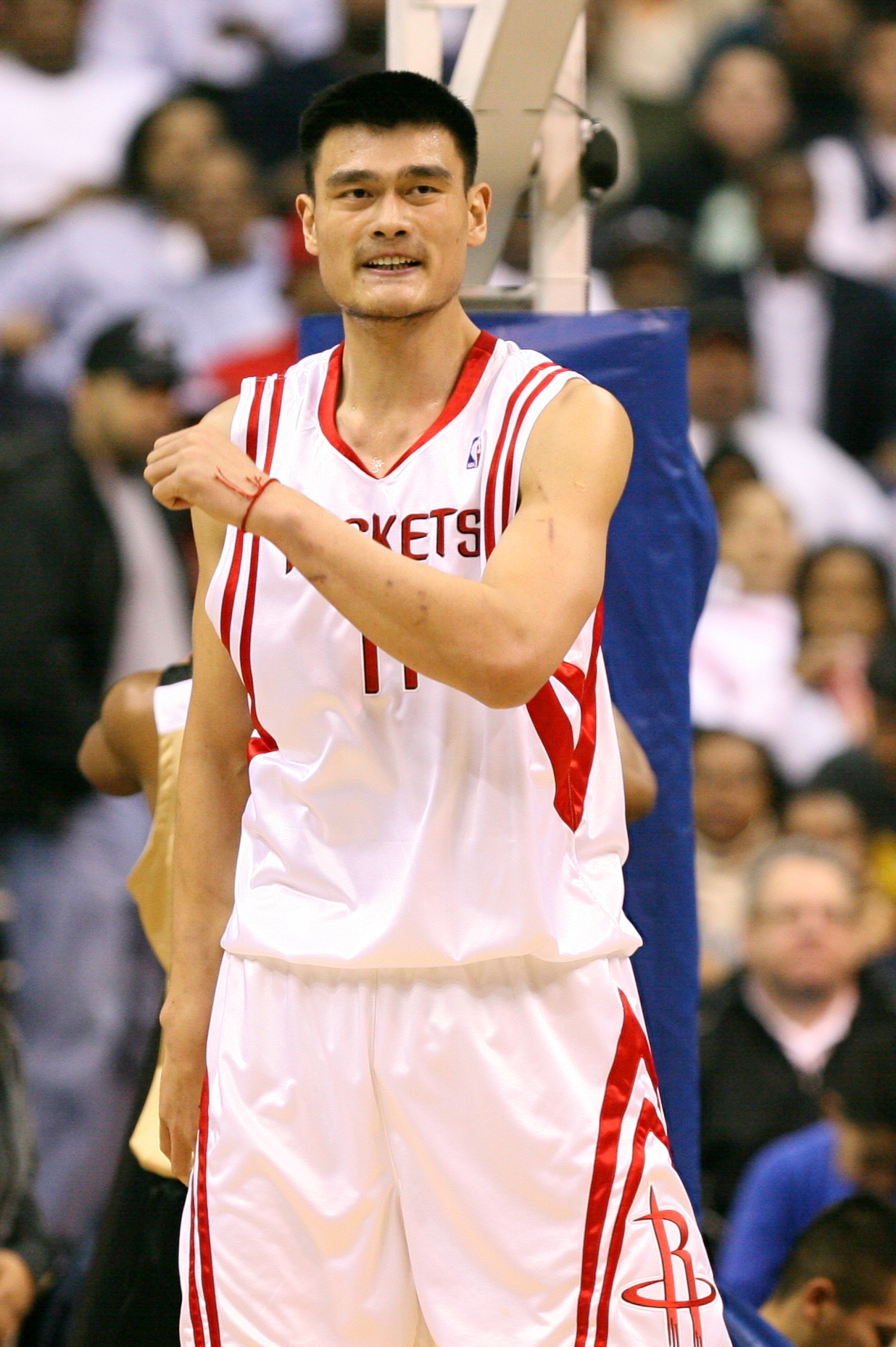
Yao Ming played in the 2001 All-Star Game.

The All-Star Game started in 1996 with the creation of the Chinese Basketball Association. It was played on April 9, 1996, in Beijing. The Blue Team, featuring players including Wang Zhizhi and Adiljan Jun, defeated the White Team 106–98. In 2005 and 2006 All-Star matches were also played between a CBA selection and the KBL All-Stars from the Korean league. The 2025 All-Star Game marked the 30th anniversary and during the event's halftime, players from the inaugural 1996 CBA All-Star Game were commended. In 2010 and 2018 editions, all 10 starters were Chinese.

Many legendary players like Yao Ming, Wang Zhizhi, Mengke Bateer and Stephon Marbury have featured in the event.

== Events ==
The All-star Weekend includes a series of activities, the All-star Game, the Rising Stars match (Rookie All-Star Game), a Slam Dunk, a Three-point and a skills challenge contest.

== List of games ==
Bold: Team that won the game.

| Year | Date / Location | Team 1 | Score | Team 2 | MVP | Club |
|---|---|---|---|---|---|---|
| 1996 | 9 April, Beijing | **Blue Team** | **106**-98 | White Team | | |
| 1997 | 5 April, Shanghai | North All-Stars | 84-**98** | **South All-Stars** | (China) Hu Weidong | Jiangsu Dragons |
| 1998 | 4 April, Shenyang | Chinese All-Stars | 80-**83** | **International All-Stars** | | |
| 2000 | | | | | | |
| 2001 | 31 March, Changchun | **Northern All-star Tigers** | **97**-95 | Southern All-star Dragons | (China) Liu Yudong | Bayi Rockets |
| 2002 | 19 February 2002 | Ebo Watch All-Stars | 120-**122** | **Jordan All-Stars** | (China) (Mongolia) Mengke Bateer | Beijing Ducks |
| 2004 | 31 March, Changchun | **Northern All-star Tigers** | **110**-102 | Southern All-star Dragons | (China) Tang Zhengdong | Jiangsu Dragons |
| 2005 | 9 March, Nanjing | **Northern All-star Tigers** | **103**-99 | Southern All-star Dragons | (China) (Mongolia) Mengke Bateer (2) | Beijing Ducks |
| 2006 | | | | | (United States) Jon Smith | Yunnan Running Bulls |
| 2007 | 11 February | **Drum Team** | **104**-81 | Flag Team | (China) Wang Shipeng | Guangdong Southern Tigers |
| 2008 | | **Blue Team** | **131**-126 | Red Team | (China) Wang Zhizhi | Bayi Rockets |
| 2009 | 29 March | **North** | **102**-97 | South | (China) Wang Zhizhi (3) | Bayi Rockets |
| 2010 | 20 March, Beijing | **North** | **133**-121 | South | (United States) Stephon Marbury | Shanxi Zhongyu Brave Dragons |
| 2011 | 20 March, Beijing | **North** | **115**-114 | South | (United States) Quincy Douby | Xinjiang Flying Tigers |
| 2012 | 19 February, Beijing | **North** | **122**-112 | South | (China) Li Gen | Qingdao Eagles |
| 2013 | 19 February, Guangzhou | North | 117-**129** | **South** | (China) Yi Jianlian | Guangdong Southern Tigers |
| 2014 | 19 January | **North** | **118**-102 | South | (China) Sun Yue | Beijing Ducks |
| 2015 | 18 January | North | 123-**142** | **South** | (United States) Michael Beasley | Shanghai Sharks |
| 2016 | 17 January | **North** | **172**-145 | South | (United States) Michael Beasley (2) | Shandong Golden Stars |
| 2017 | 8 January, Xinhua | **North** | **149**-147 | South | (China) Ding Yanyuhang | Shandong Heroes |
| 2018 | 15 January, Xinhua | North | 138-**147** | **South** | (China) Yi Jianlian (2) | Guangdong Southern Tigers |
| 2019 | 14 January, Qingdao | North | 145-**160** | **South** | (United States) Joseph Young | Nanjing Monkey Kings |
| 2020 | 12 January, Guangzhou | North | 166-**167** | **South** | (China) Zhao Rui | Guangdong Southern Tigers |
| 2021 | 22 March, Qingdao | North | 109-**123** | **South** | (China) Wu Qian | Zhejiang Golden Bulls |
| 2022 | 5 December, Zhuji | North | 88 -**100** | **South** | (China) Zhao Rui (2) | Guangdong Southern Tigers |
| 2023 | 26 March, Xinhua | **North** | **117**-113 (OT) | South | (China) Abdusalam Abdurixit | Xinjiang Flying Tigers |
| 2024 | 3 March, Xinhua | North | 122-**138** | **South** | (China) Hu Mingxuan | Guangdong Southern Tigers |
| 2025 | 3 March, Xinhua | **North** | **159**-136 | South | (China) Zou Yuchen | Beijing Royal Fighters |

=== Players with most MVP awards ===
| Player | Wins | Editions |
|---|---|---|
| (China) Wang Zhizhi | 3 | 2008, 2009 |
| (China) Yi Jianlian | 2 | 2013, 2018 |
| (United States) Michael Beasley | 2 | 2015, 2016 |
| (China) (Mongolia) Mengke Bateer | 2 | 2002, 2005 |
| (China) Zhao Rui | 2 | 2020, 2022 |

== Three-Point Shoot Contest ==
| Season | Player | Team |
|---|---|---|
| 1996-97 | (Lithuania) Saulius Štombergas | Shanghai Sharks |
| 1997-98 | (China) Zhang Jingsong | Bayi Rockets |
| 2000-01 | (Belgium) Danny Herman | |
| 1999-00 | (China) Li Nan | Bayi Rockets |
| 2000-01 | (China) Li Nan (2) | Bayi Rockets |
| 2001-02 | (China) Chang Jing-dong | Beijing Ducks |
| 2003-04 | (China) Zhu Fangyu | Guangdong Southern Tigers |
| 2009-10 | (China) Zhang Qingpeng | Xinjiang Guanghui |
| 2010-11 | (China) Sun Jie | Shandong Hi-Speed Kirin |
| 2012-13 | (China) Xi Relijiang | |
| 2013-14 | (China) He Tianju | Beijing Ducks |
| 2014-15 | (Syria) Michael Madanly | Jilin Northeast Tigers |
| 2015-16 | (China) Zhao Tailong | Fujian Sturgeons |
| 2016-17 | (United States) Jimmer Fredette | Shanghai Sharks |
| 2017-18 | (China) Yu Changchun | Nanjing Monkey King |
| 2018-19 | (China) Chen Linjian | Fujian Sturgeons |
| 2019-20 | (China) Chen Linjian (2) | Fujian Sturgeons |
| 2020-21 | (China) Hu Mingxuan | Guangdong Southern Tigers |
| 2022-23 (I) | (China) Yuan Shuai | |
| 2022-23 (II) | (China) Wang Ruize | Qingdao DoubleStar |
| 2023-24 | (China) Yuan Shuai | Shanxi Loongs |
| 2024-25 | (China) Yuan Shuai (2) | Shanxi Loongs |

== Slam-Dunk winners ==
| Season | Player | Team |
|---|---|---|
| 1996-97 | (United States) James Hodges | Liaoning Hunters |
| 1997-98 | (United States) James Hodges (2) | Liaoning Hunters |
| 2000-01 | (United States) Rod Gregory | Jilin Northeast Tigers |
| 2001-02 | (United States) Alex Scales (United States) Steven Hart | Jiangsu Dragons; Shanghai Sharks |
| 2003-04 | (China) Guang Hu | Guangdong Southern Tigers |
| 2007-08 | (United States) Mike Harris | Dongguan Leopards |
| 2010-11 | (China) Zhao Tailong | Fujian Sturgeons |
| 2012-13 | (China) Zhai Yi | Shanghai Sharks |
| 2013-14 | (United States) Ivan Johnson | Zhejiang Golden Bulls |
| 2014-15 | (China) Luo Kaiwen | Bayi Rockets |
| 2015-16 | (China) Wang Tong | Shanghai Sharks |
| 2016-17 | (China) Sun Minghui | Zhejiang Lions |
| 2017-18 | (China) Zhang Jianhao | Guangdong University of Technology |
| 2018-19 | (China) Zhang Jianhao (2) | Guangdong University of Technology |
| 2019-20 | (China) Yi Jinhong | |
| 2020-21 | (China) Zhang Zhenlin | Liaoning Flying Leopards |
| 2022-23 (I) | (China) Li Tianrong | Shanghai Sharks |
| 2022-23 (II) | (China) Yang Hao | |
| 2023-24 | (China) Wan Lei | |
| 2024-25 | (China) Chen Dengxing | |

== Skill Challenge winners ==
| Season | Player | Team |
|---|---|---|
| 2009-10 | (Taiwan) Lin Chih-chieh | Zhejiang Guangsha |
| 2010-11 | (Taiwan) Lin Chih-chieh | Zhejiang Guangsha |
| 2012-13 | (China) Guo Ailun | Liaoning Flying Leopards |
| 2013-14 | (China) Zirui Wang | Zhejiang Lions |
| 2015-16 | (China) Zhou Zhandong | Guangdong Southern Tigers |
| 2016-17 | (China) Wang Zirui | Xinjiang Flying Tigers |
| 2017-18 | (China) Yu Dehao | Shenzhen Leopards |
| 2018-19 | (China) Jiang Weize | Jilin Northeast Tigers |
| 2019-20 | (China) Chen Peidong | |
| 2020-21 | (China) Wu Yongsheng | Xinjiang Flying Tigers |
| 2022-23 (I) | (China) Wang Yibo | Shanghai Sharks |
| 2022-23 (II) | (China) Xu Jie | Guangdong Southern Tigers |
| 2023-24 | (China) Li Yiyang | Fujian Sturgeons |
| 2024-25 | (China) Xu Jie (2) | Guangdong Southern Tigers |

== Topscorers ==
| Season | Player | Points | Team |
|---|---|---|---|
| 1996-97 | (China) Hu Weidong | 42 | Jiangsu Dragons |
| 2001-02 | (United States) Jason Woodard | 23 | Sina Lions |
| 2004-05 | (China) (Mongolia) Mengke Bateer | 28 | Beijing Ducks |
| 2006-07 | (China) Wang Shipeng | 30 | Wang Shipeng |
| 2007-08 | (China) Li Xiaoxu | 29 | Liaoning Flying Leopards |
| 2008-09 | (Nigeria) Olumide Oyedeji | 24 | Shanxi Loongs |
| 2009-10 | (United States) Rodney White | 32 | Zhejiang Guangsha Lions |
| 2010-11 | (United States) Quincy Douby | 44 | Xinjiang Flying Tigers |
| 2011-12 | (China) Li Gen | 31 | Qingdao Eagles |
| 2012-13 | (China) Yi Jianlian | 34 | Guangdong Southern Tigers |
| 2013-14 | (United States) Jonathan Gibson | 25 | Zhejiang Lions |
| 2014-15 | (United States) Michael Beasley | 59 | Shanghai Sharks |
| 2015-16 | (United States) Michael Beasley (2) | 63 | Shandong Golden Stars |
| 2016-17 | (China) Ding Yanyuhang | 31 | Shandong Heroes |
| 2017-18 | (China) Yi Jianlian (2) | 28 | Guangdong Southern Tigers |
| 2018-19 | (United States) Joseph Young | 40 | Nanjing Monkey Kings |
| 2019-20 | (United States) (Taiwan) Lin Shuhao | 40 | Beijing Ducks |
| 2020-21 | (China) Wu Qian | 23 | Zhejiang Golden Bulls |
| 2022-23 (II) | (China) Hu Mingxuan | 24 | Guangdong Southern Tigers |
| 2023-24 | (China) Hu Mingxuan (2) | 31 | Guangdong Southern Tigers |

== CBA vs KBL All-Star match ==
The CBA All-Stars played against the KBL All-Stars on four occasions. In 2005 they both had from one win, just like the following year.

Bold: Team that won the game.

| Year | Date / Location | Team 1 | Score | Team 2 | MVP | Club |
|---|---|---|---|---|---|---|
| 2005 | | **CBA All Stars** | defeated | KBL All-Stars | | |
| 2005 | | CBA All Stars | 82-**85** | **KBL All-Stars** | (South Korea) Kim Seung-hyun | Daegu Tongyang Orions (KBL) |
| 2006 (I) | Seoul | CBA All Stars | 86-**98** | **KBL All-Stars** | | |
| 2006 (II) | 24 January | **CBA All Stars** | **104**-85 | KBL All-Stars | (China) Liu Wei | Shanghai Sharks |

=== Topscorers ===
| Season | Player | Points | Team |
|---|---|---|---|
| 2005 | (Nigeria) Olumide Oyedeji | 19 | Beijing Ducks |
| 2006 (II) | (Canada) (Cameroon) Charles Minlend | 23 | Busan KCC Egis (KBL) |

== Players with most selections ==
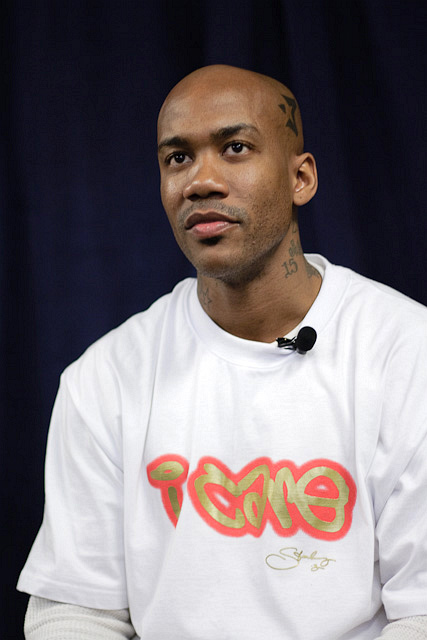
Stephon Marbury has been selected 9 times.

| Player | All-Star | Editions | Notes |
|---|---|---|---|
| (China) Yi Jianlian | 12 | 2004–2007, 2013–2020 | 2x MVP |
| (United States) Stephon Marbury | 9 | 2010, 2011, 2012, 2013, 2014 and 2015, 2017 | 2015, 2017: Did not participate due to injury, CBA All-Star MVP (2010) |
| (China) Guo Ailun | 8 | 2013, 2015–2021 | |
| (Taiwan) Lin Chih-chieh | 6 | 2010, 2011, 2013–2017 | 2× CBA Skills Challenge champion (2010, 2011) |
| (China) Ding Yanyuhang | 4 | 2013, 2014, 2017, 2018 | All-Star Game MVP (2017) |

== Distinctions ==
=== FIBA Hall of Fame ===
- (China) Yao Ming

=== Basketball Hall of Fame ===
- (China) Yao Ming
