= 2010–11 Chinese Basketball Association season =

2010–11 CBA season
- League: Chinese Basketball Association
- Sport: Basketball
- Duration: December 10, 2010 – April 27, 2011
- TV partner(s): CCTV-5, 163 TV(online) and many local channels.

Regular Season
- Season champions: Xinjiang Flying Tigers
- Season MVP: (China) Mengke Bateer

Playoffs

Finals
- Champions: Guangdong Southern Tigers
- Runners-up: Xinjiang Flying Tigers
- Finals MVP: (China) Wang Shipeng

CBA seasons
- ← 09–10 11–12 →

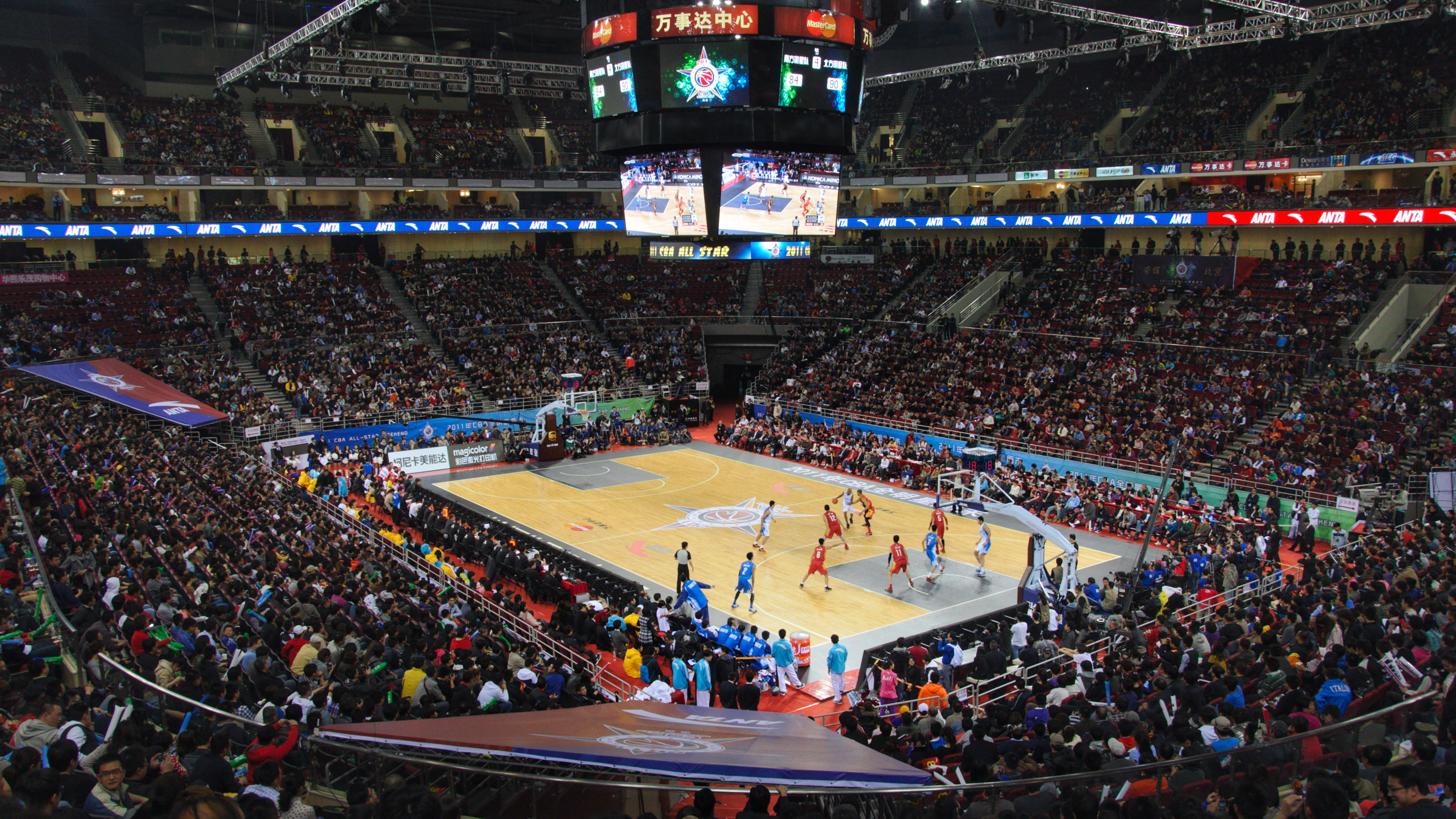

The 2010–11 CBA season is the 16th CBA season. Guangdong Southern Tigers won their fourth consecutive and overall seventh CBA title, defeating Xinjiang Flying Tigers in the Finals for a third year in a row, four games to two.

== Changes ==
After a one-year suspension due to salary reasons, Yunnan Bulls were removed from the CBA.

All teams except Bayi Rockets can have two foreign players while the bottom 5 teams of last season have an extra right to sign an Asian player. Generally, Asian players are not counted as foreign players, and foreign players of each team can play no more than 6 quarters collectively each game. However, when facing Bayi Rockets, Asian players are counted as foreign ones while foreign players can play no more than 5 quarters collectively. Players from Hong Kong and Chinese Taipei are counted as domestic players in either situation.

== Coaching changes ==
Club	Outgoing	Manner	When	Incoming
Qingdao Eagles	(China) Wang Weili	Health issues	After Round 6 (Dec 24, 2010)	(South Korea) Kang Jung-Soo
Shanxi Brave Dragons	(China) Gao Shumin	Sacked	After Round 8 (Dec 30, 2010)	(United States) Patrick Sellers (caretaker)
Fujian Xunxing	(United States) J. C. Owens	Sacked	After Round 9 (Jan 2, 2011)	(China) Ma Lianbao
Shanxi Brave Dragons	(United States) Patrick Sellers (caretaker)	Replaced	After Round 10 (Jan 3, 2011)	(China) Yang Xuezeng

== Regular season standings ==
#	2010–11 CBA season							
#	Team	W	L	PCT	GB	Home	Road	Tiebreaker
1	Xinjiang Flying Tigers	31	1	.969	-	16–0	15–1	
2	Guangdong Southern Tigers	25	7	.781	6	11–5	14–2	GD 1-1(227-220) DG
3	Dongguan Leopards	25	7	.781	6	13–3	12–4	GD 1-1(227-220) DG
4	Jiangsu Dragons	20	12	.625	11	10–6	10–6	
5	Zhejiang Golden Bulls	19	13	.594	12	11–5	8–8	
6	Zhejiang Lions	18	14	.562	13	11–5	7–9	
7	Bayi Rockets	17	15	.531	14	13–3	4–12	
8	Beijing Ducks	16	16	.500	15	11–5	5–11	
9	Shanxi Brave Dragons	15	17	.469	16	9–7	6–10	
10	Liaoning Dinosaurs	14	18	.438	17	11–5	3–13	LN 2-0 SD
11	Shandong Lions	14	18	.438	17	10–6	4–12	LN 2-0 SD
12	Shanghai Sharks	12	20	.375	19	10–6	2–14	SH 2-0 JL
13	Jilin Northeast Tigers	12	20	.375	19	9–7	3–13	SH 2-0 JL
14	Foshan Dralions	11	21	.344	20	8–8	3–13	
15	Qingdao Eagles	10	22	.312	21	7–9	3–13	
16	Fujian Xunxing	8	24	.250	23	6–10	2–14	
17	Tianjin Golden Lions	5	27	.156	26	5–11	0–16	

Key to colors
Top 8 teams advance to the Playoffs

== All-star weekend ==
=== Rookie Challenge ===
Southern Rookies
Pos.	Player	Team
F	(China) Gu Quan	Dongguan Leopards
G/F	(China) He Zhongmian	Dongguan Leopards
C	(China) Ren Junfei	Guangdong Southern Tigers
C	(China) Li Yuanyu	Guangdong Southern Tigers
F	(China) Wang Junjie	Jiangsu Dragons
C	(China) Zhang Zhuojun	Zhejiang Cyclone
F	(China) Ji Xiang	Shanghai Sharks
F	(China) Zhang Chengyu	Bayi Rockets
G	(China) Jin Jiming	Foshan Dralions
G	(China) Zhao Dapeng	Zhejiang Lions
Head coach: (China) Ding Wei (Zhejiang Cyclone)

Northern Rookies
Pos.	Player	Team
C	(China) Yu Changdong	Shanxi Brave Dragons
C	(China) Tao Hanlin	Shandong Lions
C	(China) Li An	Jilin Northeast Tigers
F	(China) Lian Ming	Liaoning Dinosaurs
G	(China) Guo Ailun^{MVP}	Liaoning Dinosaurs
F/G	(China) Zhang Zhihan	Tianjin Golden Lions
G	(China) Shentu Jun	Tianjin Golden Lions
C	(China) Han Chongkai	Beijing Ducks
G	(China) Chen Shidong	Beijing Ducks
G	(China) Sun Weibo	Xinjiang Flying Tigers
Head coach: (China) Wang Han (Jilin Northeast Tigers)

^MVP Guo Ailun was awarded the MVP of the game.

CCTV-5

March 19
19:30

Report

Southern Rookies 83, Northern Rookies 96
Scoring by quarter: 23-21, 22-28, 20-25, 18-20
Pts: He Zhongmian 18; Rebs: Li Yuanyu, He Zhongmian 7 Asts: Jin Jiming 5	Pts: Guo Ailun 28; Rebs: Li An 10; Asts: Guo Ailun 6

MasterCard Center, Beijing

=== All-star game ===
Southern All-Stars
Pos.	Player	Team	Total votes
Starters
G	(United States) Stephon Marbury	Foshan Dralions	150031
G	(China) Mo Ke	Bayi Rockets	118908
F	(China) Wang Shipeng	Guangdong Southern Tigers	139887
F	(China) Zhang Kai	Dongguan Leopards	141345
C	(China) Wang Zhizhi	Bayi Rockets	209632
Reserves
G	(Chinese Taipei) Lin Chih-Chieh	Zhejiang Lions	-
F	(China) Zhu Fangyu	Guangdong Southern Tigers	-
C	(China) Su Wei	Guangdong Southern Tigers	-
G	(China) Liu Wei	Guangdong Southern Tigers	-
G/F	(China) Yi Li	Jiangsu Dragons	-
C	(China) Ding Jinhui	Zhejiang Cyclone	-
G	(United States) Marcus Williams	Zhejiang Cyclone	-
Head coach: (China) Li Chunjiang (Guangdong Southern Tigers)

Northern All-Stars
Pos.	Player	Team	Total votes
Starters
G	(China) Zhang Qingpeng	Liaoning Dinosaurs	199924
G	(United States) Quincy Douby^{MVP}	Xinjiang Flying Tigers	149661
F	(China) Li Xiaoxu	Liaoning Dinosaurs	140897
F	(China) Zhang Nan	Tianjin Ronggang	89087
C	(China) Mengke Bateer	Xinjiang Flying Tigers	181531
Reserves
F/C	(United States) Randolph Morris	Beijing Ducks	-
G	(Chinese Taipei) Lee Hsueh-Lin	Beijing Ducks	-
G	(China) Yu Shulong	Jilin Northeast Tigers	-
F	(China) Zhong Cheng	Jilin Northeast Tigers	-
G/F	(China) Chen Lei	Beijing Ducks	-
G	(China) Sun Jie	Shandong Lions	-
F	(China) Zhang Xuewen	Shanxi Brave Dragons	-
Head coach: (China) Jiang Xingquan (Xinjiang Flying Tigers)

^MVP Quincy Douby was awarded the MVP of the game.

CCTV-5

March 20
19:00

Report

Southern All-stars 114, Northern All-stars 115
Scoring by quarter: 22-31, 33-32, 29-27, 30-25
Pts: Marcus Williams 31; Rebs: Marcus Williams 12; Asts: Stephon Marbury 7	Pts: Quincy Douby 44; Rebs: Mengke Bateer 10; Asts: Lee Hsueh-Lin 6

MasterCard Center, Beijing

=== Slam Dunk Contest ===
Contestants
Pos.	Player	Team	Preliminary			Final		
Pos.	Player	Team	1st dunk	2nd dunk	Total	1st dunk	2nd dunk	Total
F	(China) Zhao Tailong	Fujian Xunxing	43	47	90	50	44	94
F	(China) Wu Nan	Jiangsu Dragons	41	49	90	45	45	90
G	(United States) James Singleton	Zhejiang Lions	42	47	89^{+}	44	45	89
C	(China) Zhang Xuewen	Shanxi Brave Dragons	44	45	89	—		
C	(China) Wu Ke	Shandong Lions	39	41	80	—		
F	(China) Zhang Ji	Tianjin Ronggang	37	36	73	—		

^+ Singleton advanced to the final with 46 points in an extra dunk, in which Zhang Xuewen got 41 points.

=== Three-Point Shootout ===
Contestants
Pos.	Player	Team	Preliminary	Final
G	(China) Sun Jie	Shandong Lions	16	21
G	(China) Zhang Qingpeng	Liaoning Dinosaurs	14	19
F	(China) Zhang Bo	Bayi Rockets	10	15
G	(Chinese Taipei) Lee Hsueh-Lin	Beijing Ducks	8	—
G	(United States) Stephon Marbury	Foshan Dralions	7	—
G	(United States) Quincy Douby^{INJ}	Xinjiang Flying Tigers	—	

^INJ Unable to participate due to injury.

=== Skills Challenge ===
Contestants
Pos.	Player	Team	Preliminary	Final
G	(Chinese Taipei) Lin Chih-Chieh	Zhejiang Lions	35.4	38.1
G	(China) Guo Ailun	Liaoning Dinosaurs	40.5	40.6
G	(China) Xie Libin	Beijing Ducks	40.6	—
G	(China) Yu Shulong	Jilin Northeast Tigers	62.9	—

== Playoffs ==
Teams in bold advanced to the next round. The numbers to the left of each team indicate the team's seeding in regular season, and the numbers to the right indicate the number of games the team won in that round. Home court advantage belongs to the team with the better regular season record; teams enjoying the home advantage are shown in italics.

Quarterfinals; Best of 5
1	**Xinjiang Flying Tigers**	**3**
8	Beijing Ducks	0
4	**Jiangsu Dragons**	**3**
5	Zhejiang Cyclone	0
3	**Dongguan Leopards**	**3**
6	Zhejiang Lions	1
2	**Guangdong Southern Tigers**	**3**
7	Bayi Rockets	0

Semifinals; Best of 5
1	**Xinjiang Flying Tigers**	**3**
4	Jiangsu Dragons	0
3	Dongguan Leopards	0
2	**Guangdong Southern Tigers**	**3**

Finals; Best of 7
1	Xinjiang Flying Tigers	2
2	**Guangdong Southern Tigers**	**4**

== Awards ==
Week	Players of the Week award	
Week	Domestic	Foreign
1	Zhang Kai (Dongguan)	(United States) James Singleton (Xinjiang)
2	Zhang Kai (Dongguan) (2)	(United States) Quincy Douby (Xinjiang)
3	Wang Shipeng (Guangdong)	(Lebanon) Jackson Vroman (Dongguan)
4	Tang Zhengdong (Jiangsu)	(United States) James Singleton (Xinjiang) (2)
5	Wang Lei (Bayi)	(United States) Mike Harris (Shanghai)
6	Ding Jinhui (Zhejiang C.)	(United States) Mike Harris (Shanghai) (2)
7	Ding Jinhui (Zhejiang C.) (2)	(United States) Stephon Marbury (Foshan)
8	Hu Xuefeng (Jiangsu)	(United States) Quincy Douby (Xinjiang) (2)
9	Wang Zhizhi (Bayi)	(United States) Marcus Williams (Zhejiang C.)
Playoffs
10	Su Wei (Guangdong)	(United States) James Singleton (Xinjiang) (3)
11	Wang Zhizhi (Bayi) (2)	(United States) Quincy Douby (Xinjiang) (3)

== Statistical leaders ==
Category	Player	Team	Stat
Points per game	(United States) Charles Gaines	Qingdao Eagles	33.7
Rebounds per game	(United States) Dwayne Jones	Fujian Xunxing	15.8
Assists per game	(United States) (Jordan) Osama Daghles	Shanxi Brave Dragons	9.1
Steals per game	(China) Hu Xuefeng	Jiangsu Dragons	4.1
Blocks per game	(Ivory Coast) Hervé Lamizana	Tianjin Ronggang	3.6
