= 2011–12 Chinese Basketball Association season =

2011–12 CBA season
- League: Chinese Basketball Association
- Sport: Basketball
- Duration: November 19, 2011 – March 30, 2012
- TV partner(s): CCTV-5 and many local channels.

Regular Season
- Season champions: Guangdong Southern Tigers
- Season MVP: (China) Zhu Fangyu

Playoffs

Finals
- Champions: Beijing Ducks
- Runners-up: Guangdong Southern Tigers
- Finals MVP: (Taiwan) Lee Hsueh-lin

CBA seasons
- ← 10–11 12–13 →

The 2011–12 CBA season is the 17th CBA season. This season began on November 19, 2011, and ended on March 30, 2012.

== Foreign players policy ==
All teams except Bayi Rockets can have two foreign players, while the bottom 5 teams of last season have an extra right to sign an Asian player. In addition, due to the NBA 2011 Lockout, any international player that signs to any CBA team have to abide by their contracts signed. The rule of using players in each game is described in this chart:

#	Facing other teams	Facing Bayi Rockets
Chinese players+	No Limit	No Limit
Asian players	No Limit	5 quarters collectively
International players	6 quarters collectively	5 quarters collectively

+ Including players from Hong Kong and Chinese Taipei.

== Coaching changes ==
Club	Outgoing	Manner	When	Incoming
Xinjiang Flying Tigers	(United States) Bob Donewald, Jr.	Sacked	After Round 13 (Dec 19, 2011)	(China) Jiang Xingquan
Jiangsu Dragons	(China) Xu Qiang	Health reasons	After Round 13 (Dec 20, 2011)	(China) Hu Weidong
Liaoning Dinosaurs	(China) Guo Shiqiang	Resigned	After Round 15 (Dec 24, 2011)	(China) Li Ge
Foshan Dralions	(United States) Jay Humphries	Sacked	After Round 16 (Dec 27, 2011)	(China) Shi Liping

== Regular season standings ==
#	2011–12 CBA season							
#	Team	W	L	PCT	GB	Home	Road	Tiebreaker
1	Guangdong Southern Tigers	27	5	.844	-	15–1	12–4	
2	Beijing Ducks	21	11	.657	6	12–4	9–7	
3	Shanxi Brave Dragons	20	12	.625	7	14–2	6–10	
4	Xinjiang Flying Tigers	19	13	.594	8	14–2	5–11	XJ 1-1(187-186) DG
5	Dongguan Leopards	19	13	.594	8	13–3	6–10	XJ 1-1(187-186) DG
6	Shanghai Sharks	18	14	.563	9	14–2	4–12	SH 2-0 ZL
7	Zhejiang Lions	18	14	.563	9	12–4	6–10	SH 2-0 ZL
8	Fujian Xunxing	17	15	.531	10	12–4	5–11	
9	Qingdao Eagles	16	16	.500	11	11–5	5–11	
10	Liaoning Dinosaurs	15	17	.469	12	12–4	3–13	LN 2-0 ZG
11	Zhejiang Golden Bulls	15	17	.469	12	11–5	4–12	LN 2-0 ZG
12	Jilin Northeast Tigers	14	18	.438	13	11–5	3–13	JL 1-1(180-166) SD
13	Shandong Lions	14	18	.438	13	12–4	2–14	JL 1-1(180-166) SD
14	Bayi Rockets	10	22	.313	17	8–8	2–14	BY 3-1; TJ 2-2; FS 1-3
15	Tianjin Golden Lions	10	22	.313	17	8–8	2–14	BY 3-1; TJ 2-2; FS 1-3
16	Foshan Dralions	10	22	.313	17	7–9	3–13	BY 3-1; TJ 2-2; FS 1-3
17	Jiangsu Dragons	9	23	.281	18	9–7	0–16	

Key to colors
Top 8 teams advance to the Playoffs

== All-star weekend ==
=== Rookie Challenge ===
Southern Rookies
Pos.	Player	Team
F	(China) Gu Quan	Dongguan Leopards
F/c	(China) Sun Tonglin	Dongguan Leopards
G	(China) Shi Hongfei	Guangdong Southern Tigers
C	(China) Li Yuanyu	Guangdong Southern Tigers
F	(China) Wei Song	Jiangsu Dragons
F	(China) Xia Yubo	Zhejiang Golden Bulls
F	(China) Cao Yan	Bayi Rockets
G	(China) Tian Yuxiang	Bayi Rockets
G	(China) Zeng Lingxu	Foshan Dralions
G	(China) Wang Zirui	Zhejiang Lions
Head coach: (China) Wang Zhizhi (Bayi Rockets)

Northern Rookies
Pos.	Player	Team
F	(China) Ding Yanyuhang	Shandong Lions
G	(China) Xu Jiahan	Shandong Lions
C	(China) Li An	Jilin Northeast Tigers
C	(China) Yan Pengfei	Shanxi Brave Dragons
F	(China) Ge Zhaobao	Shanxi Brave Dragons
G	(China) Guo Ailun^{MVP}	Liaoning Dinosaurs
F	(China) Ren Junwei	Shanxi Brave Dragons
G	(China) Shen Tujun	Tianjin Golden Lions
C	(China) Zhu Yanxi	Beijing Ducks
F	(China) Zhai Xiaochuan	Beijing Ducks
Head coach: (United States) Stephon Marbury (Beijing Ducks)

^MVP Guo Ailun was awarded the MVP of the game.

CCTV-5

February 18
19:30

Report

Southern Rookies 88, Northern Rookies 105
Scoring by quarter: 24-30, 28-19, 18-22, 18-34
Pts: Li Yuanyu, Zeng Lingxu 14; Rebs: Sun Tonglin 17; Asts: Wang Zirui 3	Pts: Guo Ailun 30; Rebs: Zhai Xiaochuan 13; Asts: Guo Ailun 6

International Sports Arena, Guangzhou
Referees:
Liang Bin
Yang Hongfeng
Guo Nan

=== All-star game ===
Southern All-Stars
Pos.	Player	Team	Total votes
Starters
G	(United States) J. R. Smith^{PER}	Zhejiang Golden Bulls	418183
G	(China) Wang Shipeng	Guangdong Southern Tigers	415468
F	(China) Ding Jinhui	Zhejiang Golden Bulls	405198
F	(China) Zhu Fangyu	Guangdong Southern Tigers	444258
C	(China) Wang Zhizhi	Bayi Rockets	814670
Reserves
G	(United States) Aaron Brooks	Guangdong Southern Tigers	-
G	(China) Liu Wei	Shanghai Sharks	-
C	(China) Zhang Zhaoxu	Shanghai Sharks	-
C	(China) Zhang Kai	Dongguan Leopards	-
G/F	(China) Yi Li	Jiangsu Dragons	-
G/F	(China) Zhao Tailong	Fujian Xunxing	-
F	(Jordan) Zaid Abbas	Fujian Xunxing	-
C	(United States) Will McDonald	Fujian Xunxing	-
Head coach: (China) Li Chunjiang (Guangdong Southern Tigers)

^PER Unable to participate for personal reasons, Aaron Brooks was named as the replacement for J. R. Smith.

Northern All-Stars
Pos.	Player	Team	Total votes
Starters
G	(United States) Stephon Marbury	Beijing Ducks	592629
G	(China) Yang Ming	Liaoning Dinosaurs	521580
F	(China) Li Xiaoxu	Liaoning Dinosaurs	749716
F	(China) Zhang Nan	Tianjin Golden Lions	621255
C	(China) Mengke Bateer^{PER}	Xinjiang Flying Tigers	705015
Reserves
C	(China) Han Dejun	Liaoning Dinosaurs	-
F	(China) Zhong Cheng	Jilin Northeast Tigers	-
F	(China) Ji Zhe	Beijing Ducks	-
C	(China) Li Gen^{MVP}	Qingdao Eagles	-
G	(United States) Lester Hudson	Qingdao Eagles	-
G	(China) Lü Xiaoming	Shanxi Brave Dragons	-
F	(United States) Charles Gaines	Shanxi Brave Dragons	-
C	(China) Wu Ke	Shandong Lions	-
Head coach: (China) Min Lulei (Beijing Ducks)

^PER Unable to participate for personal reasons, Han Dejun was named as the replacement for Mengke Bateer.
^MVP Li Gen was awarded the MVP of the game.

CCTV-5

February 19
19:30

Report

Southern All-stars 112, Northern All-stars 122
Scoring by quarter: 36-26, 26-22, 30-39, 20-35
Pts: Will McDonald 25; Rebs: Will McDonald 8 Asts: Aaron Brooks 9	Pts: Li Gen 31; Rebs: Charles Gaines 10; Asts: Lü Xiaoming, Lester Hudson 8

International Sports Arena, Guangzhou
Referees:
Qiao Longsheng
Wang Mei
Zhang Lei

=== Slam Dunk Contest ===
Contestants
Pos.	Player	Team	Preliminary			Final		
Pos.	Player	Team	1st dunk	2nd dunk	Total	1st dunk	2nd dunk	Total
F	(China) Zhao Tailong	Fujian Xunxing	44	41	85	42	44	86
C	(China) Yan Pengfei	Shanxi Brave Dragons	44	42	86	41	44	85
F	(China) Chang Lin	Beijing Ducks	42	50	92	49	31	80
F	(China) Yang Wenbo	Foshan Dralions	39	42	81	—		
F	(China) Meng Xianglong	Tianjin Golden Lions	38	39	77	—		
G	(China) Tian Yuxiang	Bayi Rockets	45	30	75	—		

=== Three-Point Shootout ===
Contestants
Pos.	Player	Team	Preliminary	Final
C	(China) Zhu Yanxi	Beijing Ducks	21	17
G	(China) Sun Jie	Shandong Lions	17	13
G	(United States) Lester Hudson	Qingdao Eagles	16	9
G	(United States) Aaron Brooks	Guangdong Southern Tigers	15	—
G	(United States) Ahmed Mian	Tianjin Golden Lions	14	—
G	(China) Luo Zhi	Foshan Dralions	10	—

=== Skills Challenge ===
Contestants
Pos.	Player	Team	Preliminary	Final
G	(China) Guo Ailun	Liaoning Dinosaurs	65.6	32.7
G	(China) Zeng Lingxu	Foshan Dralions	73.1	39.9
G	(China) Chen Jianghua	Guangdong Southern Tigers	74.7	—
G	(China) Xiralijan Muhtar	Xinjiang Flying Tigers	97.8	—

== Statistics leaders ==
=== Individual statistic leaders ===
Category	Player	Team	Statistics
Points per game	(United States) J. R. Smith	Zhejiang Golden Bulls	34.4
Rebounds per game	(Jordan) Zaid Abbaas	Fujian Xunxing	14.9
Assists per game	(Jordan) Osama Daghles	Jilin Northeast Tigers	7.3
Steals per game	(United States) Lester Hudson	Qingdao Eagles	2.6
Blocks per game	(China) Xu Zhonghao	Bayi Rockets	3.9
Minutes per game	(Jordan) Zaid Abbaas	Fujian Xunxing	43.3

== Awards ==
=== Yearly Awards ===
- CBA Most Valuable Player: Zhu Fangyu, Guangdong Southern Tigers
- Rookie of the Year: Zhu Yanxi, Beijing Ducks
- Coach of the Year: Min Lulei, Beijing Ducks & Yang Xuezeng, Shanxi Brave Dragons

=== Players of the week ===
The following players were named the Domestic and Foreign Players of the Week.

Week	Domestic Player	Foreign Player	Ref.
1	Yi Jianlian (Guangdong Southern Tigers)	(United States) Wilson Chandler (Zhejiang Lions)	
2	Xu Zhonghao (Bayi Rockets)	(United States) J. R. Smith (Zhejiang Golden Bulls)	
3	Mengke Bateer (Xinjiang Flying Tigers)	(United States) Charles Gaines (Shanxi Brave Dragons)	
4	Zhu Yanxi (Beijing Ducks)	(United States) Ahmed Mian (Jilin Northeast Tigers)	
5	Han Dejun (Liaoning Dinosaurs)	(Puerto Rico) Peter Ramos (Zhejiang Lions)	
6	Zhu Fangyu (Guangdong Southern Tigers)	(United States) Josh Boone (Zhejiang Golden Bulls)	
7	Li Xiaoxu (Liaoning Dinosaurs)	(United States) Marcus Williams (Shanxi Brave Dragons)	
8	Han Dejun (Liaoning Dinosaurs) (2)	(United States) Charles Gaines (Shanxi Brave Dragons) (2)	
9	Wang Zhizhi (Bayi Rockets)	(United States) Donnell Harvey (Tianjin Golden Lions)	
10	Zhang Kai (Dongguan Leopards)	(United States) Mike Harris (Shanghai Sharks)	
11	Lü Xiaoming (Shanxi Brave Dragons)	(United States) Charles Gaines (Shanxi Brave Dragons) (3)	

== Playoffs ==
Teams in bold advanced to the next round. The numbers to the left of each team indicate the team's seeding in regular season, and the numbers to the right indicate the number of games the team won in that round. Home court advantage belongs to the team with the better regular season record; teams enjoying the home advantage are shown in italics.

Quarterfinals; Best of 5
1	**Guangdong Southern Tigers**	**3**
8	Fujian Xunxing	0
4	**Xinjiang Flying Tigers**	**3**
5	Dongguan Leopards	2
3	**Shanxi Brave Dragons**	**3**
6	Shanghai Sharks	1
2	**Beijing Ducks**	**3**
7	Zhejiang Lions	0

Semifinals; Best of 5
1	**Guangdong Southern Tigers**	**3**
4	Xinjiang Flying Tigers	0
3	Shanxi Brave Dragons	2
2	**Beijing Ducks**	**3**

Finals; Best of 7
1	Guangdong Southern Tigers	1
2	**Beijing Ducks**	**4**
