= Chinese Basketball Association records =

This article contains Chinese Basketball Association records for individual and for team performances.

== Individual highs ==
This is a list of individual records separated into three categories — single game, single season, and career.
Records last updated and confirmed on October 31, 2019, one day before the 2019–20 CBA season started.

=== Single game ===
Record	Num.	Player	Team	Game	Date
Points (Every player over 70)	82	(United States) Errick McCollum	Zhejiang Golden Bulls	Zhejiang Golden Bulls 119–129 Guangdong Southern Tigers	2015 January 30
Points (Every player over 70)	75	(United States) Jimmer Fredette	Shanghai Sharks	Shanghai Sharks 136–137 Beikong Fly Dragons	2018 November 11
Points (Every player over 70)	75	(United States) Quincy Douby	Zhejiang Golden Bulls	Zhejiang Golden Bulls 154–129 Shanxi Brave Dragons	2013 January 2
Points (Every player over 70)	74	(United States) Jared Cunningham	Tongxi Monkey Kings	Tongxi Monkey Kings 129–148 Fujian Sturgeons	2016 December 28
Points (Every player over 70)	74	(United States) Bobby Brown	Dongguan Leopards	Dongguan Leopards 137–135 (2OT) Sichuan Blue Whales	2013 December 27
Points (Every player over 70)	73	(United States) Jimmer Fredette	Shanghai Sharks	Shanghai Sharks 132–135 (2OT) Zhejiang Guangsha Lions	2017 February 19
Points (Every player over 70)	72	(United States) Jordan Crawford	Tianjin Gold Lions	Tianjin Gold Lions 104–113 Sichuan Blue Whales	2016 January 8
Points (Every player over 70)	71	(United States) Andre Emmett	Shandong Gold Lions	Shandong Gold Lions 129–113 Jiangsu Dragons	2010 March 7
Points (Every player over 70)	70	(China) Sun Jun	Jilin Northeast Tigers	Jilin Northeast Tigers 139–94 Jinan Army	2000 December 17
Rebounds	38	(Dominica) Garth Joseph	Shaanxi Kylins	Shaanxi Kylins 139–88 Shenzhen Yikang	2002 March 20
Assists	28	(China) Li Qun	Guangdong Southern Tigers	Guangdong Southern Tigers 110–101 Nanjing Army	2000 February 2
Steals	13	(China) Ju Weisong	Shandong Flaming Bulls	Shandong Flaming Bulls 84–70 Vanguard / Police	1995–96 Season
Steals	13	(China) Zhang Yongjun	Guangdong Southern Tigers	Bayi Rockets 109–81 Guangdong Southern Tigers	1996–97 Season
Steals	13	(China) Hu Xuefeng	Jiangsu Dragons	Jiangsu Dragons 135–108 Jilin Northeast Tigers	2004 December 1
Blocks	13	(China) Yao Ming	Shanghai Sharks	Jilin Northeast Tigers 126–118 Shanghai Sharks	2001 February 11
Blocks	13	(Ivory Coast) Hervé Lamizana	Tianjin Gold Lions	Tianjin Gold Lions 113–108 Fujian Sturgeons	2010 February 10
Blocks	13	(United States) Sean Williams	Fujian Sturgeons	Fujian Sturgeons 101–94 Jilin Northeast Tigers	2010 February 26
Minutes Played (Only available since 2011)	67	(Iran) Samad Nikkhah Bahrami	Fujian Sturgeons	Fujian Sturgeons 178–177 (5OT) Zhejiang Golden Bulls	2014 February 9
3-Pointers Made	15	(United States) Leon Rodgers	Jilin Northeast Tigers	Jilin Northeast Tigers 124–110 Shanxi Brave Dragons	2009 March 11
Dunks Made	10	(United States) James Hodges	Liaoning Hunters	Liaoning Hunters 95–85 Shandong Flaming Bulls	1998–99 Season
Free throws Made	25	(United States) Errick McCollum	Zhejiang Golden Bulls	Zhejiang Golden Bulls 119–129 Guangdong Southern Tigers	2015 January 30

=== Single season ===
Record	Num.	Player	Team	Season
Points	1,687	(United States) Joe Young	Nanjing Monkey Kings	2019–20
Rebounds	989	(Nigeria) Olumide Oyedeji	Shanxi Brave Dragons	2008–09
Assists	563	(United States) Courtney Fortson	Zhejiang Guangsha Lions	2017–18
Steals	246	(China) Hu Xuefeng	Jiangsu Dragons	2004–05
Blocks	169	(China) Yao Ming	Shanghai Sharks	2000–01
Minutes Played (Only available since 2011)	2,130	(China) Ruifeng Wang	Zhejiang Guangsha Lions	2023–24
3-Pointers Made	252	(United States) Lester Hudson	Liaoning Flying Leopards	2016–17
Dunks Made	140	(United States) Lorenzo Coleman	Xinjiang Flying Tigers	2005–06
Free throws Made	508	(United States) Kyle Fogg	Guangzhou Long-Lions	2018–19
Personal Fouls	250	(United States) Jameel Watkins	Jiangsu Dragons	2008–09
Turnovers	262	(United States) Myron Allen	Xinjiang Flying Tigers	2008–09
Games played	62	(United States) Myron Allen (China) Mengke Bateer (Canada) (Dominican Republic) Juan Mendez (China) Xu Guochong	Xinjiang Flying Tigers	2008–09

=== Career ===
Record	Num.	Player	Team(s)	Seasons
Points (Every player over 8,000)	11,165	(China) Zhu Fangyu	Guangdong Southern Tigers	1999–2000 to 2016–2017
Points (Every player over 8,000)	10,982	(China) Yi Jianlian	Guangdong Southern Tigers	2002–2003 to 2006–2007; 2011–2012 to 2022-2023
Points (Every player over 8,000)	10,544+	(United States) Lester Hudson (active)	Guangdong Southern Tigers; Qingdao Eagles; Dongguan Leopards; Xinjiang Flying Tigers; Liaoning Flying Leopards; Shandong Heroes	2010–2011 to present
Points (Every player over 8,000)	10,147	(China) Liu Wei	Shanghai Sharks; Xinjiang Flying Tigers; Sichuan Blue Whales	1997–1998 to 2018–2019
Points (Every player over 8,000)	9,688	(China) Wang Zhizhi	Bayi Rockets	1995–1996 to 2000–2001; 2006–2007 to 2014–2015
Points (Every player over 8,000)	9,087	(China) Tang Zhengdong	Jiangsu Dragons; Xinjiang Flying Tigers; Foshan Long-Lions; Tongxi/Nanjing Monkey Kings	1999–2000 to 2007–2008; 2009–10 to 2017–18
Points (Every player over 8,000)	8,387	(China) Liu Yudong	Bayi Rockets; Fujian Xunxing	1995–1996 to 2002–2003; 2004–2005; 2007–2008 to 2009–2010
Points (Every player over 8,000)	8,260	(China) Mengke Bateer	Beijing Ducks; Xinjiang Flying Tigers	1995–1996 to 2001–2002; 2004–2005 to 2005–2006; 2007–2008 to 2012–2013
Points (Every player over 8,000)	8,236	(United States) Mike Harris	Dongguan Leopards; Shanghai Sharks; Jiangsu Dragons; Zhejiang Golden Bulls; Qingdao Eagles; Sichuan Blue Whales; Fujian Sturgeons	2007–2008 to 2008–2009; 2010–2011 to 2017–2018
Rebounds	5,158	(China) Yi Jianlian	Guangdong Southern Tigers	2002–2003 to 2006–2007; 2011–2012 to 2022-2023
Assists	2,595	(China) Hu Xuefeng	Jiangsu Dragons	1999–2000 to 2016–2017
Steals	1,762	(China) Hu Xuefeng	Jiangsu Dragons	1999–2000 to 2016–2017
Blocks	852	(China) Wang Zhizhi	Bayi Rockets	1995–1996 to 2000–2001; 2006–2007 to 2014–2015
Minutes Played (Only available since 2011)	14,277+	(United States) Lester Hudson (active)	Guangdong Southern Tigers; Qingdao Eagles; Dongguan Leopards; Xinjiang Flying Tigers; Liaoning Flying Leopards; Shandong Heroes	2010–2011 to present
3-Pointers Made	1,666+	(United States) Lester Hudson (active)	Guangdong Southern Tigers; Qingdao Eagles; Dongguan Leopards; Xinjiang Flying Tigers; Liaoning Flying Leopards; Shandong Heroes	2010–2011 to present
Dunks Made	498	(United States) Jason Dixon	Guangdong Southern Tigers	1998–1999 to 2000–2001; 2002–2003 to 2008–2009
Free throws Made	2,561	(China) Yi Jianlian	Guangdong Southern Tigers	2002–2003 to 2006–2007; 2011–2012 to 2022-2023
Personal Fouls	1,607	(China) Tang Zhengdong	Jiangsu Dragons; Xinjiang Flying Tigers; Foshan Long-Lions; Tongxi/Nanjing Monkey Kings	1999–2000 to 2007–2008; 2009–10 to 2017–18
Turnovers	1,584	(China) Hu Xuefeng	Jiangsu Dragons	1999–2000 to 2016–2017
Games played	698	(China) Zhu Fangyu	Guangdong Southern Tigers	1999–2000 to 2016–2017
Seasons Played	22	(China) Liu Wei	Shanghai Sharks; Xinjiang Flying Tigers; Sichuan Blue Whales	1997–1998 to 2018–2019
Seasons Played; With Same Team	18	(China) Hu Xuefeng	Jiangsu Dragons	1999–2000 to 2016–2017
Seasons Played; With Same Team	18	(China) Liu Wei	Shanghai Sharks	1997–1998 to 2013–2014; 2018–2019
Seasons Played; With Same Team	18	(China) Zhu Fangyu	Guangdong Southern Tigers	1999–2000 to 2016–2017
Most Different Teams; Played With	8	(Jordan) Zaid Abbas	Shanghai Sharks; Beijing Ducks; Fujian Sturgeons; Shandong Gold Lions; Tianjin Gold Lions; Shanxi Brave Dragons; Tongxi Monkey Kings; Beikong Fly Dragons	2009–2010 to 2014–2015; 2016–2017 to 2017–2018

== Team records ==
This is a list of team records separated into four categories — single game, single season, single season plus postseason, and across seasons.

=== Single game ===
- Longest game

- The longest CBA game was the Fujian Sturgeons beating the Zhejiang Golden Bulls 178–177 on 2014 February 09 in 5 overtimes.

- Most points in a game

- 178 by Fujian Sturgeons (vs. 177 by Zhejiang Golden Bulls on 2014 February 09 in 5 overtimes).

- Most combined points in a game

- 355 - Fujian Sturgeons (178) vs. Zhejiang Golden Bulls (177) on 2014 February 09 in 5 overtimes.

=== Single season ===
- Most Victories (regular-season Only)

- 45 by Guangdong Southern Tigers in 2008–09 CBA season (Overall 45-5 Record)

- Most Consecutive Victories (regular-season Only)

- 26 by Guangdong Southern Tigers in 2014–15 CBA season (Nov. 28 until Jan. 30)

- Best Winning Percentage (regular-season Only)

- 1.000 (22-0) by Bayi Rockets in 1995–96 CBA season (Then went 4-0 in Playoffs)

=== Single season & postseason ===
- Most Victories (regular-season + Playoffs Combined)

- 55 by Guangdong Southern Tigers in 2008–09 CBA season (Overall 55-6 Record)

- Most Consecutive Victories (regular-season + Playoffs Combined)

- 26 by Bayi Rockets in 1995–96 CBA season (Start of season until end of Playoffs)
- 26 by Guangdong Southern Tigers in 2014–15 CBA season (Nov. 28 until Jan. 30)

- Best Winning Percentage (regular-season + Playoffs Combined)

- 1.000 (26-0) by Bayi Rockets in 1995–96 CBA season (Went 22-0 followed by 4-0)

=== Across seasons ===
- Most Consecutive Victories (regular-season Only)

- 30 by the Bayi Rockets from the start of the 1995–96 CBA season until losing in the ninth game of the 1996–97 CBA season (1996 December 25)

- Most Consecutive Victories (regular-season + Playoffs Combined)

- 34 by the Bayi Rockets from the start of the 1995–96 CBA season until losing in the ninth game of the 1996–97 CBA season (1996 December 25)

(Note: Bayi won 4 playoff games in 1995–96, and had joined the CBA holding a 14-game streak, so the team's overall spree reached 48 games)
