= CBA All-Star Game =

CBA All-Star Game may refer to:

- Chinese Basketball Association All-Star Game
- Continental Basketball Association All-Star Game
