= Lester Hudson =

American basketball player (born 1984)

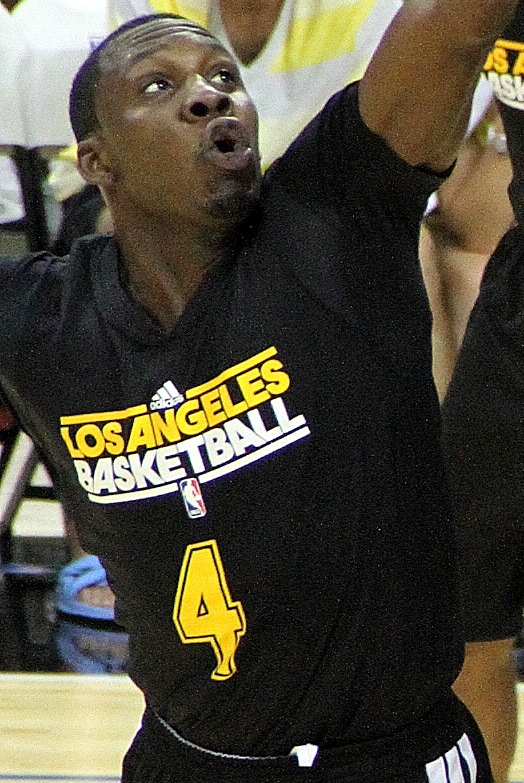
- Hudson in 2013 with the Los Angeles Lakers

Personal information
- Born: August 7, 1984 (age 42) Memphis, Tennessee, US
- Listed height: 6 ft 3 in (1.91 m)
- Listed weight: 190 lb (86 kg)

Career information
- High school: Central (Memphis, Tennessee)
- College: Southwest Tennessee CC (2005–2007); Tennessee–Martin (2007–2009)
- NBA draft: 2009: 2nd round, 58th overall pick
- Drafted by: Boston Celtics
- Playing career: 2009–2023
- Position: Point guard / shooting guard

Career history
- 2009–2010: Boston Celtics
- 2009: →Maine Red Claws
- 2010: Memphis Grizzlies
- 2010: →Dakota Wizards
- 2010–2011: Washington Wizards
- 2011: Guangdong Southern Tigers
- 2011–2012: Qingdao DoubleStar
- 2012–2013: Austin Toros
- 2012: Cleveland Cavaliers
- 2012: Memphis Grizzlies
- 2012–2013: Dongguan Leopards
- 2013–2014: Xinjiang Flying Tigers
- 2014–2019: Liaoning Flying Leopards
- 2015: Los Angeles Clippers
- 2019–2022: Shandong Heroes
- 2023: Liaoning Arctic Wolves

Career highlights
- 2× CBA champion (2011, 2018); NBL (China) scoring champion (2023); NBL All-Star (2023); NBL Best International Player of the Regular Season (2023); NBL Regular Season 3-point Scoring Leader (2023); CBA All Import Player First Team (2021); CBA All-Time Scoring Leader (2021); CBA All-Time 3-point Scoring Leader (2019); 2× CBA Foreign MVP (2014, 2015); CBA Finals MVP (2018); 2× All-CBA Guard of the Year (2014, 2016); 3× All-CBA First Team (2014–2016); CBA Best Defender (2015); 6× CBA All-Star (2012–2017); 2× CBA steals leader (2012, 2015); 2× OVC Player of the Year (2008, 2009)
- Stats at NBA.com
- Stats at Basketball Reference

Lester Hudson III (born August 7, 1984) is an American former professional basketball player for the Shandong Heroes of the Chinese Basketball Association (CBA). In the 2007–08 season, Hudson recorded the only quadruple-double in NCAA Division I men's basketball history. At the conclusion of the season, he declared himself for the 2008 NBA draft, but later withdrew. Hudson was drafted by the Boston Celtics with the 58th pick of the 2009 NBA draft, but was later waived. He was then signed by the Memphis Grizzlies. Hudson later played for the Washington Wizards and Cleveland Cavaliers before returning to the Grizzlies in April 2012.

== College career ==
Hudson put together one of the best all-around seasons in Ohio Valley Conference history in 2007–08 and helped the University of Tennessee at Martin make a six-game improvement in its league record from the previous year. The Skyhawks were picked last (11th) in a preseason poll but finished fourth and qualified for the OVC tournament.

Hudson made school, conference and NCAA history during the season, including becoming the first Division I men's player to record a quadruple-double (25 points, 12 rebounds, 10 assists and 10 steals vs. Central Baptist College) in a college game on November 13, 2007.

He also had a triple-double, eight additional double-doubles and cracked the 30-point plateau 11 times during his rookie season in the league. He finished the season ranked fifth nationally in points per game (25.7); fourth in steals (2.8) and tenth in 3-pointers made per game (3.8). He also ranked among the top 90 nationally in each rebounding (79th, 7.8/game), assists (88th, 4.5/game), 3-point percentage (72nd, 38.8%) and free throw percentage (67th, 83.4%).

A Memphis, Tennessee native who transferred from Southwest Tennessee Community College, Hudson is the first UT Martin player to receive the OVC Player of the Year award. He was again honored in the 2008–09 season, the first back to back win since Murray State University's Marcus Brown won in the 1994–1995 and 1995–1996 seasons. He was also named to the OVC All-Newcomer squad, became just the fourth Skyhawk ever named to the All-OVC first-team (2007–2008 and 2008–2009,) and was named UT Martin's Bob Carroll Male Athlete of the Year.

With All-American honors from the Associated Press and Collegeinsider.com, Hudson became the first player in UT Martin history to claim the honors since the school started playing in Division I.

== Professional career ==
Over the first few months of the 2009–10 season, Hudson split time between the Celtics and their NBADL affiliate, the Maine Red Claws. On January 2, an injury ravaged Celtics team turned to Hudson during a game against the Toronto Raptors. On January 6, 2010, Hudson was waived by the Celtics, but he was claimed by the Memphis Grizzlies two days later. The Grizzlies assigned him to the Dakota Wizards of the D-League on February 28, 2010.

Hudson was waived on July 1, 2010, by the Grizzlies.

He played for the Washington Wizards during the NBA's 2010 summer league.

Hudson was invited to Wizards' training camp for the 2010–11 NBA season and made the team. After playing six games for them, he was waived on November 23, 2010. He was re-signed on December 20, 2010, but waived again on January 5, 2011.

In January 2011 he signed with the Guangdong Southern Tigers in China. He joined Qingdao DoubleStar in November 2011.

On March 30, 2012, Hudson was signed by the Cleveland Cavaliers to the first of two 10-day contracts. He quickly established himself, scoring at least 23 points in three consecutive games from April 6 to April 10. He also hit two last-second shots to force two games into overtime. On April 20, 2012, after his second 10-day contract expired, he joined the Memphis Grizzlies for the remainder of the 2011–12 season.

On October 12, 2012, he signed with the Dongguan Leopards of China. On March 15, 2013, he was acquired by the Austin Toros of the NBA D-League.

On October 1, 2013, he signed with the Utah Jazz. He was later waived by the Jazz on October 26. In November 2013, he signed with Xinjiang Flying Tigers.

On October 14, 2014, he signed with the Liaoning Flying Leopards for the 2014–15 CBA season.

On March 29, 2015, Hudson signed a 10-day contract with the Los Angeles Clippers. On April 11, he signed a multi-year deal with the Clippers. On July 15, he was waived by the Clippers.

On September 13, 2015, Hudson returned to the Liaoning Flying Leopards, signing a new three-year deal with the club. He re-signed with the team on August 10, 2018.

During the 2019–20 season, Hudson averaged 29 points, 7 rebounds and 7 assists per game for the Shandong Heroes. He re-signed with the team on October 4, 2020.

== NBA career statistics ==
Legend
GP	Games played	GS	Games started	MPG	Minutes per game
FG%	Field goal percentage	3P%	3-point field goal percentage	FT%	Free throw percentage
RPG	Rebounds per game	APG	Assists per game	SPG	Steals per game
BPG	Blocks per game	PPG	Points per game	**Bold**	Career high

=== Regular season ===
Year	Team	GP	GS	MPG	FG%	3P%	FT%	RPG	APG	SPG	BPG	PPG
2009–10	Boston	**16**	0	4.4	.389	**.600**	.833	.5	.5	.2	.1	1.4
2009–10	Memphis	9	0	6.8	.400	.182	**.857**	1.1	.6	.6	.1	4.0
2010–11	Washington	11	0	6.6	.250	.267	.500	.5	1.5	.4	.1	1.6
2011–12	Cleveland	13	0	**24.2**	.391	.246	.842	**3.5**	**2.7**	**1.1**	**.2**	**12.7**
2011–12	Memphis	3	0	6.7	.273	.333	.667	.0	.3	.0	.0	3.0
2014–15	L.A. Clippers	5	0	11.2	**.429**	.500	.750	1.6	1.0	1.2	.2	3.6
Career		52	0	10.3	.375	.277	.806	1.4	1.2	.6	.1	4.7

=== Playoffs ===
Year	Team	GP	GS	MPG	FG%	3P%	FT%	RPG	APG	SPG	BPG	PPG
2014–15	L.A. Clippers	7	0	5.4	.429	.286	–	.1	1.0	.3	.1	2.0

== See also ==
- 2009 NCAA Men's Basketball All-Americans
