= Hu Mei =

Hu Mei may refer to

- Hu Mei (Ming dynasty), Ming dynasty general
- Hu Mei (director), film director
- Hu Mei (gymnast)
