= Josh Akognon =

Nigerian-American basketball player

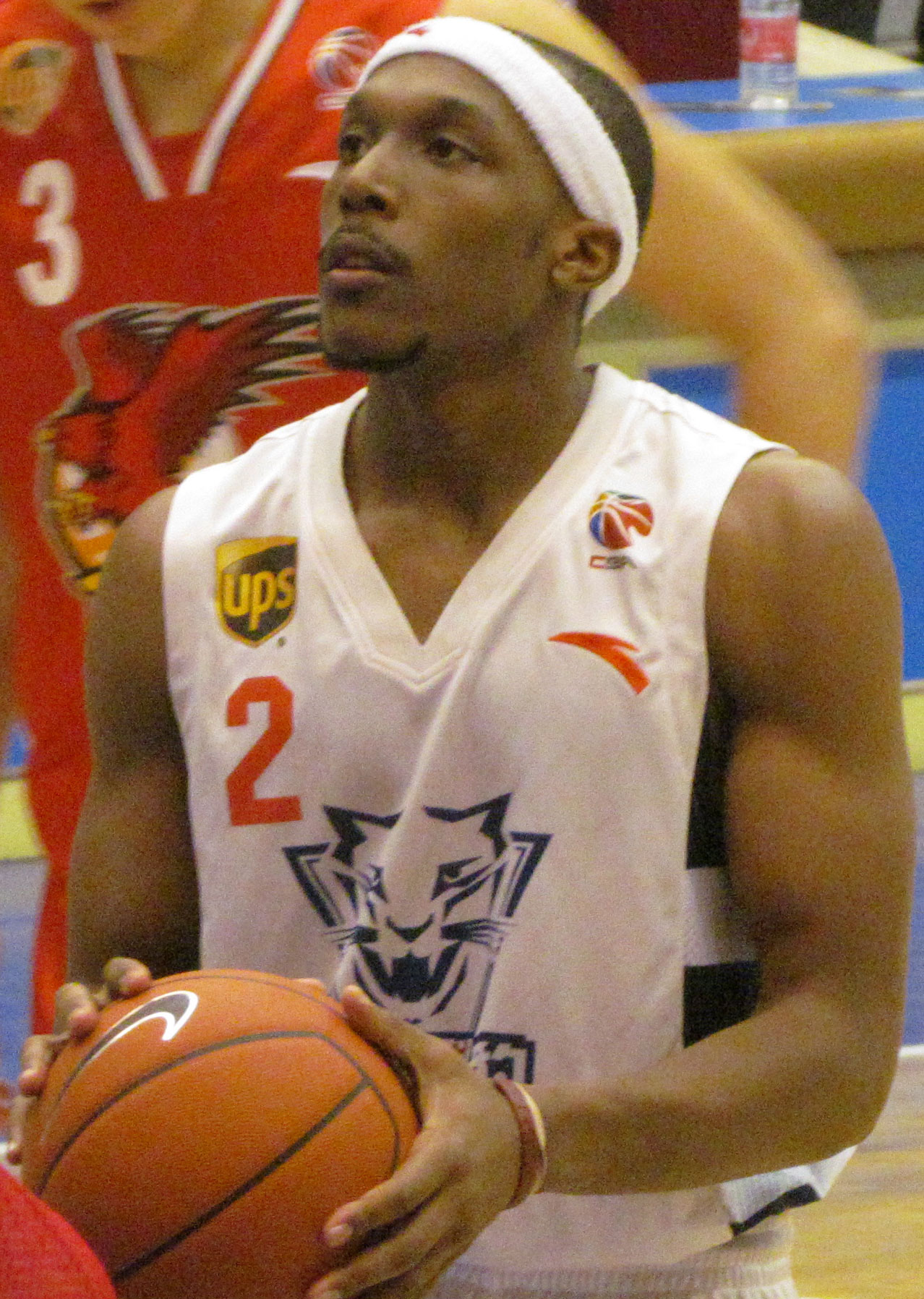
- Akognon with the Dongguan Leopards in 2011

Personal information
- Born: February 10, 1986 (age 40) Petaluma, California, U.S.
- Listed height: 5 ft 11 in (1.80 m)
- Listed weight: 185 lb (84 kg)

Career information
- High school: Casa Grande (Petaluma, California)
- College: Washington State (2004–2006); Cal State Fullerton (2007–2009)
- NBA draft: 2009: undrafted
- Playing career: 2009–2019
- Position: Point guard
- Number: 10

Career history
- 2009–2010: BC Kalev
- 2010–2012: Dongguan Leopards
- 2012: Canton Charge
- 2012–2013: Liaoning Dinosaurs
- 2013: Dallas Mavericks
- 2013–2014: Qingdao DoubleStar
- 2014: Delaware 87ers
- 2014–2015: Foshan Dralions
- 2015: Partizan Belgrade
- 2015–2016: Jilin Northeast Tigers
- 2016: Dinamo Sassari
- 2016: Baskonia
- 2016–2017: Lietuvos rytas
- 2017: Henan Shedianlaojiu
- 2018: Iberostar Tenerife
- 2018–2019: Montakit Fuenlabrada
- 2019: Goyang Orions
- 2019: Henan Shedianlaojiu

Career highlights
- 3x CBA three-point leader (2011, 2013, 2015); Baltic Basketball League leading scorer (2010); Big West Player of the Year (2009)
- Stats at NBA.com
- Stats at Basketball Reference

Joshua Emmanuel Akognon (born February 10, 1986) is a Nigerian-American former professional basketball player. He played college basketball for the Washington State Cougars and Cal State Fullerton Titans. Standing at 5 ft 11 in (1.80 m), he played at the point guard position.

== Early life ==
Akognon was born in Petaluma, California, to a Nigerian father and American mother. His father is a Baptist minister and his mother served as the minister of music at Village Baptist Church in Marin City, California. Akognon attended Casa Grande High School in Petaluma where he played organized basketball for the first time during his freshman season. Akognon averaged 30 points a game during his senior season.

== College career ==
=== Washington State (2004–2006) ===
Akognon struggled during his freshman season with the Washington State Cougars and averaged 3.9 points per game.

Akognon began his sophomore season as a starter but was soon relegated to a role off the bench.

An ankle injury to starter Derrick Low forced Akognon to play more, and he responded by scoring 27 points, including the game-winning three-pointer and clinching free throws, in a 78–71 upset of Brandon Roy-led Washington. Akognon earned Pac-10 player of the week honors and followed that game with 25 points against the UCLA Bruins at Pauley Pavilion; most of the points came against Arron Afflalo.

He earned Pontiac Pac-10 Player Honors for his winning second-half performance against the USC Trojans. Josh was also voted the Pac-10's "Most Underrated Player" in an article that ran in Sports Illustrated. Akognon led the team in scoring despite coming off the bench most of the year. Akognon transferred to Cal State Fullerton where he was eligible to play for two years at the beginning of the 2007–08 season.

=== Cal State Fullerton (2007–2009) ===
Akognon averaged 20.2 points a game and scored in double figures 28 of 31 games, making at least one three-pointer in all but two games, at least four three-pointers in 18 of 31 games and reaching 20 points in 17 of 31 games. Josh also reached the 30-point mark five times, including a 31-point effort in the NCAA Tournament against Wisconsin.

Despite an injury to his shooting hand suffered against UC-Davis, Akognon shot just under 40% from three-point range and 90% from the free throw line. Josh made 116 three-pointers and 107 free throws, a 100–100 combination matched by only seven players. Akognon also doubled his career-high in steals and reached 1,000 points for his college career.

Akognon's junior season also saw him achieve team and individual honors, with California State University, Fullerton tying for the regular-season title, winning the Big West Tournament and reaching the NCAA Tournament for the first time in 30 years with a 24–9 record. Akognon was a first team selection at the Shamrock Holiday Classic at St. Mary's, named Mid Majority Baller of the Week, named to the All-District 15 Second Team by the NABC with such players as O. J. Mayo and Kevin Love, a second team Big West selection and named MVP of the Big West Tournament where he averaged 20 points per game and hit 12 three-pointers in three games. Akognon was also named the 2007–2008 Africa Basket Player of the Year. Akognon announced on April 18 he was making himself eligible for the NBA Draft; after testing the waters and holding his own against some of the top 2008 draft prospects, Akognon decided on June 16 to return to the orange-and-blue for his senior season.

While from a team standpoint the Titans failed to match their 2007–08 success, Akognon performed brilliantly in the face of countless, hounding defenses designed to slow him down. Josh was named the 2008–09 Big West Conference Men's Basketball Player of the Year, averaging 23.9 points per game, good for 8th in the nation. Akognon broke the single season scoring record of former Titan and U.S. Olympian Leon Wood with 764 points, finished seventh overall in Titan history with 1,411 points and established a two-year scoring record for his exploits. Josh was also named to the NABC All-District 9 First Team, the only Big West player named to the team this year. Once again Akognon reached the 100–100 mark with 136 three-pointers (2nd best in the nation per game) and 132 free throws (8th best in the nation with 89.2% FT percentage). Only six other players achieved that 100–100 combination. Akognon ended the season with the longest current streak in the nation of 44 games with a made three-pointer. He finished his college career with 1,805 points and 335 three-pointers. Josh also set a Big West Tournament scoring record with 37 points in a first round win over UC Riverside that included 9 three-pointers. Akognon reached double figures in 36 of 37 games, reached the 20 point mark twenty-two times, the 30+ point mark 6 times, and has had two 41 point games. He was also one of 50 players on the early season watch list for the James Naismith Award (given to the top player in college basketball), and named to the early season list for the Bob Cousy Award (given to the top point guard in college basketball).

== Professional career ==
=== 2009–10 season ===
After going undrafted in the 2009 NBA draft, Akognon signed a contract with the Estonian team BC Kalev/Cramo for the 2009–10 season.

=== 2010–11 season ===
In 2010, Akognon joined the Dongguan Leopards of the Chinese Basketball Association (CBA) for the 2010–11 season. Akognon took the CBA by storm, averaging over 29 points in his first season and enabling DongGuan to almost double its win total from the previous year, improving to a 25–7 third-place finish in the league compared to a 13–19 record from the previous year. Akognon scored in double figures every game and had 18 20-point games, 12 30-point games, 4 40-point games and a career-high 54 point effort. He led Dongguan to a first-round victory in the CBA playoffs before falling to rival Guangdong in the semifinals. Throughout the season, Akognon displayed his scoring, dribbling, creativity and playmaking ability, delighting fans across mainland China.

=== 2011–12 season ===
In 2011, Akognon re-signed with the Leopards and averaged over 28 points a game in 2011–12 which was good enough to be the fifth leading scorer in the CBA. Most experts and writers expected Dongguan to be in a rebuilding mode and the team lost their first four games. Due to Akognon's strong play and leadership, Dongguan rallied to go 19–9 over the last 28 games and finished in 5th place. He carried his team in their exciting five-game series against Xinjiang, but fell short and lost the series 3–2.

Due to the lockout, the CBA was flooded with NBA players like J.R. Smith and Wilson Chandler. Despite the influx of pro talent, Akognon continued his strong play and confirmed his standing as one of the most outstanding players in the CBA.

On March 30, 2012, he was acquired by the Canton Charge following the conclusion of the 2011–12 CBA season. In 3 games with the Charge, Akognon averaged 16.0 points, 1.3 rebounds and 2.3 assists in 23.7 minutes of playing time.

The Charge made it to the playoffs with a 27 − 23 record and defeated the Springfield Armor in the First Round 2 − 1, but Akognon only played in the first game of the series on April 13. He would miss the Semifinals of the playoffs with the Charge due to being waived on April 17, 2012, because of injury.

=== 2012–13 season ===
Akognon joined the Sacramento Kings for the 2012 NBA Summer League. On September 27, 2012, he signed with the Dallas Mavericks. However, he was later waived by the Mavericks on October 19, 2012. In November 2012, he joined Liaoning of China for the 2012–13 season.

On April 3, 2013, he signed a 10-day contract with the Mavericks. The Mavericks played three games on April 4, April 5 and April 7, but Akognon would not participate in any of those games. After 4 years from declaring for the 2009 NBA Draft, Akognon would finally have his NBA debut on April 10, 2013, in a 91 − 102 loss to the Phoenix Suns. In his debut, Akognon was subbed in for teammate Darren Collison after a minute and ten seconds into the second quarter. He played for nearly four minutes and recorded 2 points and 1 assist.

On April 13, 2013, he signed with the Mavericks for the rest of the season. He would suit up in 2 of the Mavericks' remaining 3 games of the season. On April 14, the Mavericks defeated the New Orleans Hornets 107 − 89 with Akognon recording 3 points and no other stats in nearly 3 minutes.

The third game that Akognon played for the Mavericks at the end of the 2012–2013 season was the final game of his NBA career. On April 17, 2013, the Mavericks defeated the Hornets again, this time with a score of 99 − 87. In his final game, Akognon played for two minutes and only recorded one rebound as a statistic.

=== 2013–14 season ===
Akognon joined the Mavericks for the 2013 NBA Summer League, but was soon waived by the Mavericks on July 21, 2013. Three days later on July 24, he was claimed off waivers by the Memphis Grizzlies. On October 6, 2013, nearly a month before the 2013–2014 season began, he was waived by the Grizzlies.

In November 2013, he joined the Qingdao DoubleStar Eagles of China for the 2013–14 season.

On February 17, 2014, he left China and returned to the United States. Four days later, he was acquired by the Delaware 87ers. With the 87ers, Akognon played in the team's remaining 15 games of the season and averaged 15.6 points, 4.2 assists, 3.3 rebounds and 1.6 steals in 27.9 minutes per game. When he arrived, the team already had a losing record of 9 − 26, and the 87ers finished the season with a league-worst 12 − 38 record.

After leaving the 87ers, Akognon would spend the rest of his professional basketball career playing overseas.

=== 2014–15 season ===
On September 18, 2014, he signed a contract with the Foshan Dralions for the 2014–15 CBA season.

On March 4, 2015, he signed a contract with the Serbian team Partizan Belgrade until the end of the season. On April 23, 2015, he parted ways with Partizan.

=== 2015–16 season ===
On December 8, 2015, Akognon returned to China, this time with the Jilin Northeast Tigers. On February 2, he signed with Dinamo Sassari of Italy for the rest of the season.

=== 2016–17 season ===
On October 2, 2016, Akognon signed a one-month deal with Baskonia of the Liga ACB. The club rescinded his contract on November 6, 2016. On November 22, he signed with the Lithuanian club Lietuvos rytas. On January 21, 2017, he parted ways with Rytas.

In April 2017, Akognon signed with Henan Shedianlaojiu of China for the 2017 NBL season.

=== 2017–18 season ===
On January 12, 2018, Akognon signed with Iberostar Tenerife for the rest of the 2017–18 season.

== International career ==
Akognon was part of the Nigeria national basketball team that competed in the 2006 FIBA World Championship in Japan. He also played at the 2016 Summer Olympics and was one of the team's leaders with averages of 10.6 points, 1.6 rebounds and 1.8 assists per game.

== Career statistics ==
Legend
GP	Games played	GS	Games started	MPG	Minutes per game
FG%	Field goal percentage	3P%	3-point field goal percentage	FT%	Free throw percentage
RPG	Rebounds per game	APG	Assists per game	SPG	Steals per game
BPG	Blocks per game	PPG	Points per game	**Bold**	Career high

=== NBA ===
==== Regular season ====
Year	Team	GP	GS	MPG	FG%	3P%	FT%	RPG	APG	SPG	BPG	PPG
2012–13	Dallas	3	0	3.0	.500	.500	.000	.3	.3	.0	.0	1.7
Career		3	0	3.0	.500	.500	.000	.3	.3	.0	.0	1.7

== Personal life ==
Akognon is married to Ariana Scales who played on the Washington State Cougars women's basketball team. They have two children and live in Topeka, Kansas.
