= Ding Jinhui =

Chinese basketball player (born 1990)

Ding Jinhui 丁锦辉
Personal information
- Born: 27 October 1990 (age 36) Lishui, Zhejiang, China
- Listed height: 6 ft 8 in (2.03 m)
- Listed weight: 286 lb (130 kg)

Career information
- Playing career: 2006–2016
- Position: Power forward

Career history
- 2006–2016: Zhejiang Golden Bulls
Medals
Men's basketball
Representing China
FIBA Asia Championship
Gold medal – first place	2011 Wuhan
Asian Games
Gold medal – first place	2010 Guangzhou

Ding Jinhui (Chinese: 丁锦辉; pinyin: Dīng Jǐnhuī; born 27 October 1990) is a retired Chinese basketball player.

== CBA career ==
Ding Jinhui signed his first professional contract with Chinese Basketball Association side Zhejiang Golden Bulls in 2006. He averaged 14.5 points per game and 6.1 rebounds per game in the 2006–07 season. He was named as an all-star in the 2009–10 season, playing in the 2010 CBA All-Star Game.

In 2016, due to injuries, Ding announced his retirement at the age of 27.

== International career ==
Ding was part of the Chinese team that won the 2010 Asian Games and the 2011 FIBA Asian Championship, and took part at the 2012 Olympics.

== Career statistics ==
=== CBA statistics ===
Year	Team	GP	RPG	APG	FG%	FT%	PPG
2006-07	Zhejiang	34	6.1	1.6	.472	.841	14.5
2007-08	Zhejiang	30	7.5	1.6	.455	.740	18.6
2008-09	Zhejiang	36	6.3	1.7	.425	.791	15.3
2009-10	Zhejiang	32	6.3	2.5	.508	.767	14.1
2010-11	Zhejiang	32	8.3	2.5	.416	.647	14.7
2011-12	Zhejiang	31	7.0	2.1	.380	.575	11.3
2012-13	Zhejiang	33	8.3	2.2	.434	.792	15.0
2013-14	Zhejiang	19	6.5	1.8	.422	.667	11.4
Career		247	7.0	2.0	.439	.728	14.4
