= Nangang Gymnasium =

Sports venue in Nanjing, China

- Full name: Nangang Gymnasium
- Location: Nanjing, China
- Capacity: 6,000

Construction
- Opened: 1995

Tenant
- Jiangsu Dragons (CBA)

Nangang Gymnasium is an indoor sporting arena located in Nanjing, China. The capacity of the arena is 6,000 spectators and opened in 1995. It hosts indoor sporting events such as basketball and volleyball. It hosts the Jiangsu Dragons of the Chinese Basketball Association.
