= Li Gen (basketball) =

Chinese basketball player

Li Gen 李根
Personal information
- Born: August 15, 1988 (age 38) Jiaozuo, Henan, China
- Listed height: 6 ft 10 in (2.08 m)
- Listed weight: 243 lb (110 kg)

Career information
- Playing career: 2008–2022
- Position: Forward

Career history
- 2008–2010: Shanghai Sharks
- 2010–2012: Qingdao Eagles
- 2012–2015: Beijing Ducks
- 2015–2019: Xinjiang Flying Tigers
- 2019–2020: Shanghai Sharks
- 2020–2022: Beijing Royal Fighters

Career highlights
- 2× CBA champion (2014, 2015); CBA All-Star Game MVP (2012)
Medals
Men's basketball
Representing China
FIBA Asia Championship
Gold medal – first place	2015 Changsha

Li Gen (Chinese: 李根, born August 15, 1988) is a Chinese former professional basketball player who played as a forward.

== Professional career ==
Li started his career with the Shanghai Sharks at the age of 20 during the 2008–09 CBA season. After two winters in Shanghai, he moved to the Qingdao Eagles for the next two years. He averaged 18 points per game to lead all domestic players in scoring during the 2011–12 CBA season, and was also the MVP of that campaign's CBA All-Star Game.

Li then spent the next three years of his career with the Beijing Ducks, helping the Capital Squad capture back-to-back league championships during the 2013–14 CBA season and 2014–15 CBA season. Unable to come to terms on a new contract with Beijing in the summer of 2015, he then signed with Xinjiang instead.

== International career ==
On the international scene, Li represented China national basketball team at the 2015 FIBA Asia Championship in Changsha, China. He scored nine points in 13 minutes of action off the bench, as the PRC beat the Philippines 78-67 in the Championship Game, which was played on October 3.
