= Wang Tong (basketball) =

Chinese basketball player (born 1995)

Wang Tong 王潼
Personal information
- Born: 3 January 1995 (age 31) Jiaozuo, Henan, China
- Listed height: 2.02 m (6 ft 8 in)
- Position: Guard / forward

Career history
- 2012: Hebei Springs
- 2015–2016: Shanghai Sharks
- 2017: Brisbane Bullets
- 2017–2022: Shanghai Sharks

Career highlights
- CBA slam dunk champion (2016)

Wang Tong is a Chinese basketball player.

In October 2016, he signed with the Brisbane Bullets of the Australian NBL as a developmental player. After playing in three games with the team, he returned to the Shanghai Sharks.

== CBA personal records ==
Area	Amount	Date	Opponent
Points	23	December 2019	Guangdong Southern Tigers
Rebounds	12	July 2020	Shenzhen Leopards
Assists	4	January 2020	Shanxi Loongs
Steals	4	November 2019	Shandong Heroes
Blocks	3	November 2019	Shenzhen Leopards
Efficiency	33	December 2019	Guangdong Southern Tigers
