= Zhao Tailong =

Chinese basketball player

Zhao Tailong 赵泰隆
Personal information
- Born: 1 April 1990 (age 36) Changchun, Jilin, China
- Listed height: 6 ft 6 in (1.98 m)
- Listed weight: 187 lb (85 kg)

Career information
- NBA draft: 2012: undrafted
- Playing career: 2007–2022
- Position: Shooting guard / small forward

Career history
- 2007–2019: Fujian Sturgeons
- 2019–2022: Qingdao Eagles

Career highlights
- CBA All-Star (2012)
Medals
Men's basketball
Representing China
FIBA Asia Championship
Gold medal – first place	2015 Changsha
Asian Games
Gold medal – first place	2018 Jakarta
East Asian Games
Silver medal – second place	2013 Tianjin

Zhao Tailong (Chinese: 赵泰隆, born January 4, 1990) is a Chinese former basketball player of the Chinese Basketball Association.

== Professional career ==
Zhao started out his playing career with the Sturgeons back in 2007 under their junior squad before officially being promoted into the team's professional roster sometime around the 2011-12 CBA season. During his first season as a professional, Zhao would be named a CBA All-Star for the Southern All-Stars team; he has since been named a CBA All-Star multiple times throughout his career. Because of that distinction, Zhao is considered to be a star player for Fujian alongside Wang Zhelin, who was previously drafted by the Memphis Grizzlies in the 2016 NBA draft. He had also previously participated in both the 2014 Asian Games and the 2015 FIBA Asia Championship, with the latter event having a national team that had most of its roster be 23 or younger entering the event. The team had won the gold medal throughout that time, with Zhao having participation with the team as well. For Zhao's first two seasons with Fujian, he was able to start for every game with the team while also managing to improve on his point production and other major statistics between his first professional season and his second. However, during his third season, his production started to slip up a bit, due in part to him starting in fewer games with the Sturgeons with an injury he'd display sometime in the 2013-14 CBA season. Zhao's production would continue to slip under his next two seasons, even with him gaining more of a starting role again when compared to this third season in the CBA. He is currently projected to returning as a full-time starter again, with Zhao not only trying to help the team out in gaining more victories in the process, but also get back to the level he was at earlier on to the point of being on the Chinese national team.
