= Zhu Fangyu =

Chinese basketball player

Zhu Fangyu 朱芳雨
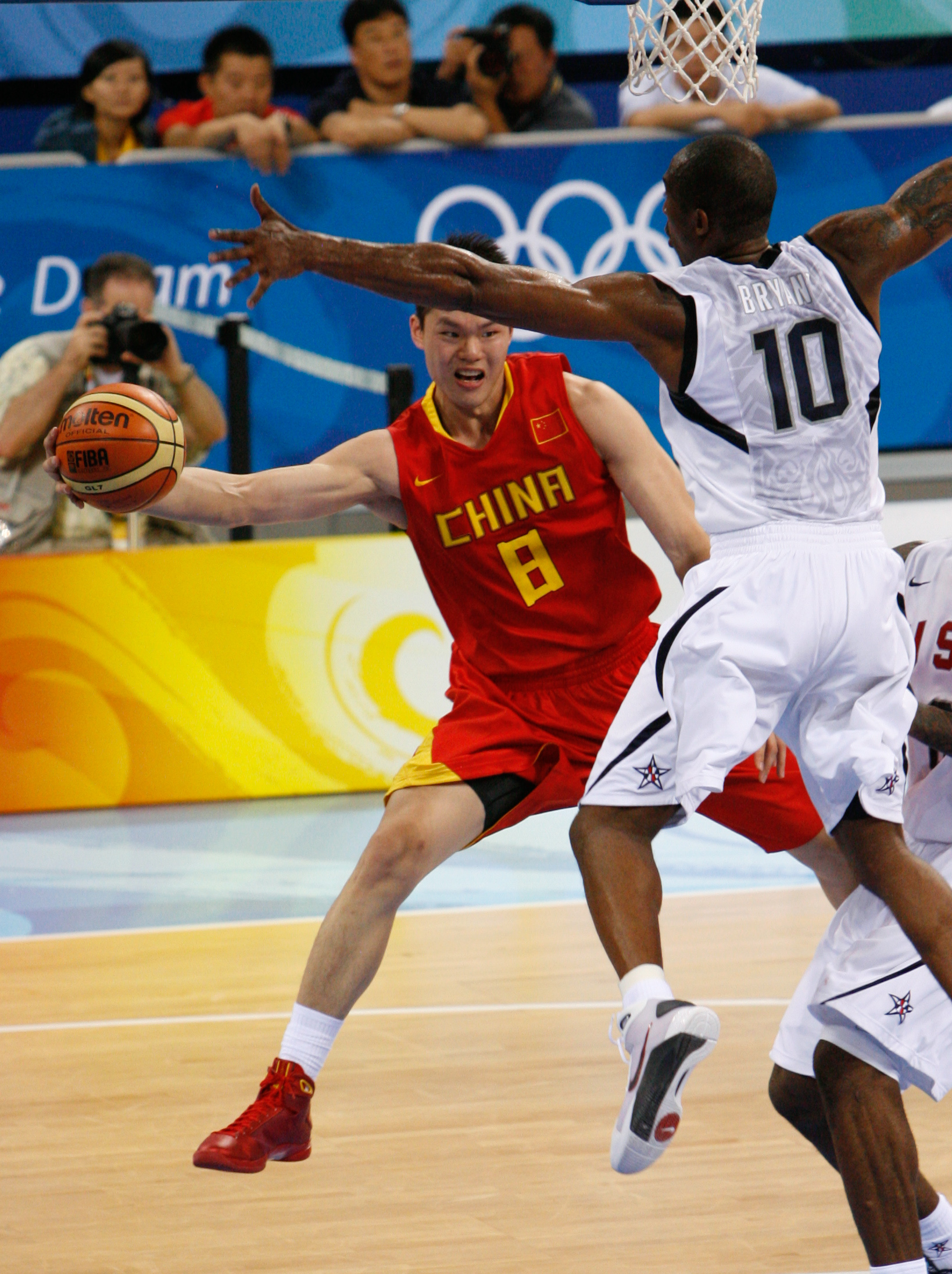
- Zhu (#8 in red, with the ball) playing against The Redeem Team, in 2008.

Personal information
- Born: 5 January 1983 (age 43) Liuzhou, Guangxi, China
- Listed height: 6 ft 7 in (2.01 m)
- Listed weight: 230 lb (104 kg)

Career information
- Playing career: 1999–2017
- Position: Small forward
- Number: 8
- Coaching career: 2016–2017

Career history

Playing
- 1999–2017: Guangdong Southern Tigers

Coaching
- 2016–2017: Guangdong Southern Tigers (assistant)

Career highlights
- As player: 8× CBA champion (2004–2006, 2008–2011, 2013); 2× CBA MVP (2008, 2012); 4× CBA Finals MVP (2005, 2008–2010); CBA three-point leader (2004); 2× CBA 3-Point Shootout Champion (2004, 2005); CBA All-Time Scoring Leader; As executive: 3× CBA champion (2019–2021)
Medals
Men's basketball
Representing China
FIBA Asia Cup
Gold medal – first place	2011 Wuhan
Silver medal – second place	2009 Tianjin
Asian Games
Gold medal – first place	2006 Doha
Gold medal – first place	2010 Guangzhou
Silver medal – second place	2002 Busan
Universiade Games
Silver medal – second place	2001 Beijing

Zhu Fangyu (Chinese: 朱芳雨; pinyin: Zhū Fāngyǔ) is a former professional Chinese professional basketball player, who spent his entire pro club career with the Guangdong Southern Tigers of the Chinese Basketball Association (CBA). Standing at a height of 2.01 meters (6'7") tall, and weighing 104 kilograms (230 pounds), he played at the small forward position. He was nicknamed "The Rain of Three-Pointers", due to his ability to sink three-pointers at crucial moments during games.

== Professional career ==
During his 18-year club career, Zhu helped the Guangdong Southern Tigers win eight Continental Basketball Association (CBA) titles, which was tied for the most in league history at the time of his retirement. He was named the CBA Finals MVP a record-setting four times – in 2005, 2008, 2009, and 2010 – and he also claimed the CBA's regular season MVP award in 2008 and 2012.

On 19 February 2016, in a game against the Shandong Golden Stars, Zhu became the first player in CBA history to score more than 11,000 career points, after previously becoming the first to surpass the 10,000-point milestone.

Zhu retired at the end of the 2016–17 CBA season, as the league's all-time leader in games played (698), total points scored (11,165), and three-pointers made (1,607), as well as tied for the most seasons played with the same team (18).

== National team career ==
Zhu was a longtime member of the senior men's Chinese national team. Zhu was the best 3-point shooter on the team, and he helped the Chinese squads win gold medals at the 2006 Asian Games, the 2010 Asian Games, and the 2011 FIBA Asia Championship. He also played on Chinese squads that competed at the 2004 Athens, 2008 Beijing, and 2012 London editions of the FIBA Summer Olympic Games, as well as the 2002 and 2006 editions of the FIBA World Cup.

== Post-playing career ==
After he retired from playing pro club basketball, Zhu moved into the Guangdong Southern Tigers' front office, and he became the team's general manager. On 25 August 2026, Zhu decided to leave his position.

== Career statistics ==
=== CBA statistics ===
Regular season and Playoffs combined

Year	Team	GP	MPG	2P%	3P%	FT%	RPG	APG	SPG	BPG	PPG
1999–00	Guangdong	28	N/A	.650	.000	.600	1.1	0.1	0.2	0.1	2.1
2000–01	Guangdong	24	N/A	.490	.271	.761	5.2	1.0	1.2	0.5	14.3
2001–02	Guangdong	27	N/A	.490	.398	.792	6.7	1.6	1.7	0.5	23.8
2002–03	Guangdong	36	N/A	.551	.432	.872	4.6	1.9	2.6	0.3	21.8
2003–04	Guangdong	31	N/A	.486	.419	.820	6.1	2.4	2.2	0.2	21.3
2004–05	Guangdong	52	N/A	.478	.402	.822	4.9	1.7	1.8	0.4	20.8
2005–06	Guangdong	53	N/A	.509	.386	.848	3.5	1.7	2.0	0.4	15.1
2006–07	Guangdong	41	N/A	.543	.449	.787	4.0	1.8	2.2	0.2	15.7
2007–08	Guangdong	41	N/A	.555	.463	.856	5.0	2.5	1.6	0.4	20.5
2008–09	Guangdong	54	N/A	.534	.423	.877	5.0	2.2	2.1	0.5	19.5
2009–10	Guangdong	41	N/A	.472	.425	.840	4.5	1.5	1.8	0.3	17.9
2010–11	Guangdong	39	N/A	.412	.331	.795	4.3	1.3	1.3	0.4	12.5
2011–12	Guangdong	41	30.3	.448	.357	.820	4.4	1.7	1.3	0.3	16.9
2012–13	Guangdong	39	31.8	.471	.388	.784	4.3	1.7	1.3	0.5	12.8
2013–14	Guangdong	42	27.5	.447	.449	.800	2.8	1.5	1.0	0.2	11.5
2014–15	Guangdong	46	33.9	.483	.457	.777	3.8	2.0	1.0	0.3	18.4
2015–16	Guangdong	34	28.6	.479	.448	.769	3.1	1.8	1.1	0.1	10.9
2016–17	Guangdong	29	19.3	.321	.291	.815	2.6	1.2	0.8	0.1	5.0
Career		698	INC	.491	.411	.819	4.2	1.7	1.6	0.3	16.0

== Personal life ==
Zhu Fangyu was married to rhythmic gymnast Hu Mei, whom he met at the 2004 Summer Olympics, from 2008 to 2013. They had 2 children before their divorce, which was marred by allegations that he cheated on her.
