= Chen Jianghua =

Chinese basketball player (born 1989)

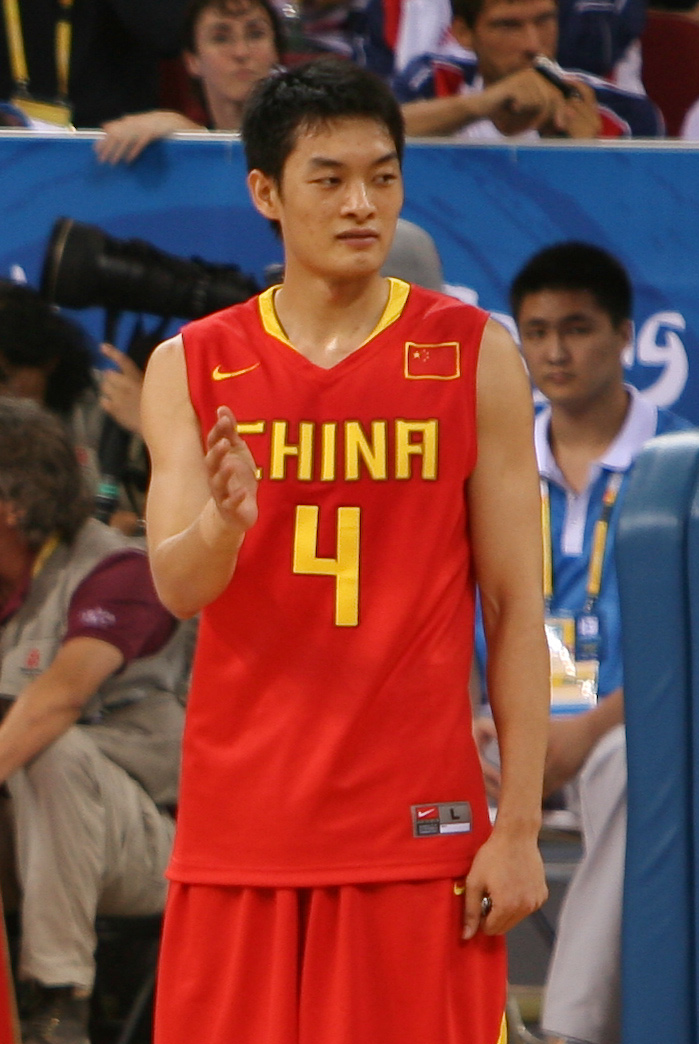

Personal information
- Born: March 12, 1989 (age 37) Guangzhou, Guangdong, China
- Listed height: 6 ft 2 in (1.88 m)
- Listed weight: 190 lb (86 kg)

Career information
- Playing career: 2005–2017
- Position: Point guard

Career history

Playing
- 2005–2017: Guangdong Southern Tigers

Coaching
- 2017–2018: Guangdong Southern Tigers (assistant)

Career highlights
- 5× CBA Champion
Medals
Men's basketball
Representing China
FIBA Asia Under-18 Championship
Gold medal – first place	2006 Urumqi

Chen Jianghua (simplified Chinese: 陈江华; traditional Chinese: 陳江華; pinyin: Chén Jiānghuā; born March 12, 1989, in Panyu, Guangzhou, Guangdong, China) is a Chinese former professional basketball player.

== Basketball career ==
=== Early years ===
Chen first came to the U.S. in February 2002, with 3 teammates from Weilun Sports School in Guangdong, after winning the 3-on-3 Nike China Streetball Championship in Shanghai a year before. Wang Zhizhi, who watched the 4-membered team play in Dallas, remarked to CCTV reporters about a kid who could dunk with ease at, "such a young age".

After that, Chen spent six months at a U.S. Basketball Academy in Eugene, Oregon, with fellow Chinese prospect Tang Zhengdong. In an article by the Oregonian, former Oregon Ducks point guard Luke Ridnour, was reportedly impressed by Chen's quickness.

Chen first became well known in 2003, when a New York Times front page article was written about him. That article was then followed by a Boston Globe article, and an article on ESPN Magazine.

Chen played in the 2005 Reebok ABCD Camp, where fellow camper Will Harris said that he was "the best unknown prospect in the world".

== Chinese national team ==
Chen was picked to play on the senior men's Chinese national basketball team at the 2006 FIBA World Championship, despite being only 17 years old. He averaged 3.5 points and 1 assist a game, in 10.3 minutes a game. However, both Dwyane Wade and Mike Krzyzewski commented positively on his play.

Chen was also selected to be on the Chinese national team for the 2008 Summer Olympics, at the age of just 19. He played for China again at the 2012 Summer Olympics.
