= Su Wei (basketball) =

Chinese basketball player

Su Wei 苏伟
Personal information
- Born: July 28, 1989 (age 37) Rizhao, Shandong, China
- Listed height: 7 ft 0 in (2.13 m)
- Listed weight: 275 lb (125 kg)

Career information
- Playing career: 2006–2022
- Position: Center

Career history
- 2006–2013: Guangdong Southern Tigers
- 2013–2016: Xinjiang Flying Tigers
- 2016–2018: Qingdao DoubleStar Eagles
- 2018–2022: Guangdong Southern Tigers
Medals
Men's basketball
Representing China
FIBA Asia Championship
Silver medal – second place	2009 Tianjin
Gold medal – first place	2011 Wuhan
FIBA Asia Under-18 Championship
Gold medal – first place	2006 Urumqi

Su Wei (simplified Chinese: 苏伟; traditional Chinese: 蘇偉; pinyin: Sū Wěi; born July 28, 1989) is a Chinese former professional basketball player. Born in Rizhao, Shandong, he is also a member of the China men's national basketball team

== Professional career ==
Su has spent the first five years of his career with the Guangdong Southern Tigers of the Chinese Basketball Association after signing with the team in 2006 as a 17-year-old. In the 2009–10 season, he had his best season to date, averaging 5.3 points and 3.3 rebounds per game for the team. He has helped the Tigers win three CBA titles.

== Chinese national team ==
Su was a part of the Chinese national junior basketball team that competed at the FIBA Under-19 World Championship 2007. He averaged 11.8 points and 6.2 rebounds per game for the 12th-placed Chinese team. He made his debut for the senior team at the FIBA Asia Championship 2009; at 20 years of age, he was the second youngest Chinese player at the tournament. He saw action in five of nine games for the silver medal-winning Chinese team. With the silver medal performance, China qualified for the 2010 FIBA World Championship.
