= Zhang Qingpeng =

Chinese professional basketball player

Zhang Qingpeng 张庆鹏
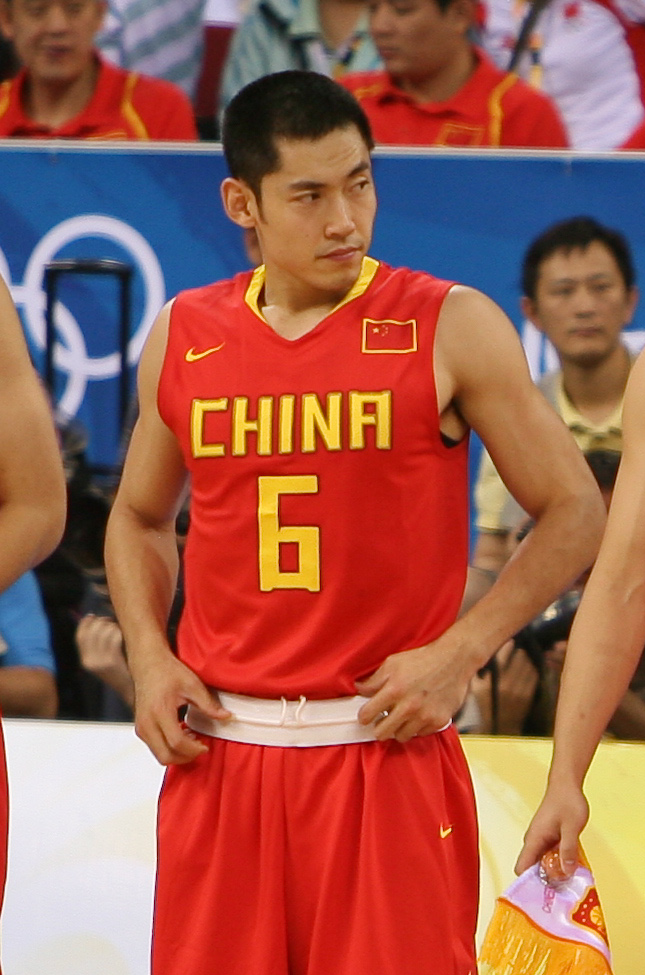
- Zhang Qingpeng — Beijing 2008 Olympics

Personal information
- Born: March 28, 1981 (age 45) Fushun, Liaoning, China
- Listed height: 6.2 ft 0 in (1.89 m)

Career information
- Playing career: 2001–2020

Career history

Playing
- 2001–2010: Liaoning Flying Leopards
- 2010–2014: Xinjiang Flying Tigers
- 2014–2017: Beijing Ducks
- 2017–2020: Shandong Hi-Speed Kirin

Coaching
- 2020–2021: China U18 (assistant)
- 2021–2022: Tianjin Pioneers (assistant)
- 2022–2025: Tianjin Pioneers
- 2025–2026: Beijing Royal Fighters

Career highlights
- 1× CBA Champion (2015); 1× CBA All-Star (2011)
Medals
Men's basketball
Representing China
FIBA Asia Championship
| Silver medal – second place | 2009 Tianjin | Team |
Asian Games
| Gold medal – first place | 2010 Guangzhou | Team |
East Asian Games
| Bronze medal – third place | 2005 Macau |
FIBA Asia Under-18 Championship
| Gold medal – first place | 2002 Kuwait |
FIBA Asia Under-20 Championship
| Silver medal – second place | 2004 Tehran |

Zhang Qingpeng (born March 28, 1981, in Fushun, Liaoning) is a Chinese former professional basketball player who played as a point guard for the Beijing Shougang Ducks in the CBA. He also played for the Liaoning Dinosaurs and the Xinjiang Flying Tigers in the Chinese Basketball Association.

He played as a point guard for the China men's national basketball team at the 2008 Olympics in Beijing.
