= Marcus Williams (basketball, born 1986) =

American basketball player

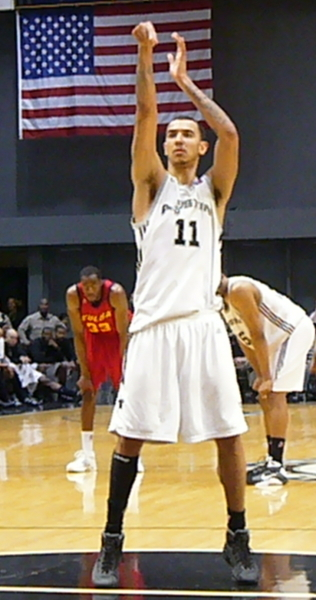
- Williams with the Austin Toros in 2009

Personal information
- Born: November 18, 1986 (age 39) Seattle, Washington, U.S.
- Listed height: 6 ft 7 in (2.01 m)
- Listed weight: 205 lb (93 kg)

Career information
- High school: Roosevelt (Seattle, Washington)
- College: Arizona (2005–2007)
- NBA draft: 2007: 2nd round, 33rd overall pick
- Drafted by: San Antonio Spurs
- Playing career: 2007–2017
- Position: Small forward / shooting guard
- Number: 33, 3, 2, 11

Career history
- 2007–2010: Austin Toros
- 2007: San Antonio Spurs
- 2008: Los Angeles Clippers
- 2009: San Antonio Spurs
- 2009: →Austin Toros
- 2009–2011: Zhejiang Wanma Cyclones
- 2011–2014: Shanxi Zhongyu
- 2015: Zhengzhou Dayun
- 2015: Jilin Northeast Tigers

Career highlights
- CBA All-Star (2011); NBA D-League All-Star (2009); All-NBA D-League First Team (2009); All-NBA D-League Third Team (2008); First-team All-Pac-10 (2007); Pac-10 All-Freshman Team (2006)
- Stats at NBA.com
- Stats at Basketball Reference

Marcus Elliot Williams (born November 18, 1986) is an American former professional basketball player. Williams can play small forward, shooting guard and point guard.

== College career ==
Williams attended Roosevelt High School in Seattle before playing college basketball for University of Arizona from 2005 to 2007. In 2005–06, he played in all 33 of Arizona's games and started 25 games. Williams was the second leading scorer, averaging 13.0 points per game while leading the team in three point field goal percentage. He also averaged 4.7 rebounds and 1.8 assists per game. His performance was good enough to earn him a spot on the Pac-10 all-freshman team. After considering entering the 2006 NBA draft, he returned for his sophomore year and was named to the All-Pac-10 first team. On April 5, 2007, he declared for the NBA draft, foregoing his final two years of college eligibility.

== Professional career ==
Williams was selected with the 33rd overall pick in the 2007 NBA draft by the San Antonio Spurs. In July 2007, he joined the Spurs for the 2007 NBA Summer League. On September 28, 2007, he signed with the Spurs. However, he was later waived by the Spurs on October 27, 2007. In November 2007, he was acquired by the Austin Toros of the NBA D-League. On December 26, 2007, he re-signed with the Spurs and made his NBA debut the same day. However, three days later, he was again waived by the Spurs after managing just one game. On January 3, 2008, he returned to the Toros.

On March 28, 2008, he signed with the Los Angeles Clippers for the rest of the 2007–08 NBA season. In July 2008, he joined the Clippers for the 2008 NBA Summer League.

On September 27, 2008, he signed with the Charlotte Bobcats. However, he was later waived by the Bobcats on October 14, 2008. In November 2008, he was reacquired by the Austin Toros.

On April 8, 2009, he signed with the San Antonio Spurs for the rest of the 2008–09 NBA season. On April 15, 2009, he was assigned back down to the Austin Toros. Five days later, he was recalled by the Spurs. On October 25, 2009, he was waived by the Spurs.

In November 2009, he joined the Zhejiang Wanma Cyclones of China for the 2009–10 CBA season. On March 22, 2010, he was reacquired by the Austin Toros following the conclusion of the CBA season.

In July 2010, he joined the Indiana Pacers for the 2010 NBA Summer League. In December 2010, he re-joined the Zhejiang Wanma Cyclones.

On September 14, 2011, he signed with Shanxi Zhongyu for the 2011–12 CBA season. In May 2012, he re-signed with Shanxi Zhongyu for the 2012–13 season. In January 2013, he was banned by the CBA for six months after testing positive for marijuana. In November 2013, he re-joined Shanxi Zhongyu for the 2013–14 season.

On September 30, 2014, he signed with the Denver Nuggets. However, he was later waived by the Nuggets on October 22, 2014. In August 2015, he joined the Zhengzhou Dayun for the 2015 NBL season.

In August 2015, he signed with the Jilin Northeast Tigers for the 2015–16 CBA season. In December 2015, he parted ways with Jilin.

== NBA career statistics ==
Legend
GP	Games played	GS	Games started	MPG	Minutes per game
FG%	Field goal percentage	3P%	3-point field goal percentage	FT%	Free throw percentage
RPG	Rebounds per game	APG	Assists per game	SPG	Steals per game
BPG	Blocks per game	PPG	Points per game	**Bold**	Career high

=== Regular season ===
Year	Team	GP	GS	MPG	FG%	3P%	FT%	RPG	APG	SPG	BPG	PPG
2007–08	San Antonio	1	0	2.0	.000	.000	.000	.0	.0	.0	**1.0**	.0
2007–08	L.A. Clippers	**10**	0	**3.4**	.263	.000	.000	**1.2**	**.3**	**.1**	.0	1.0
2008–09	San Antonio	2	0	1.5	**1.000**	.000	.000	.0	.0	.0	.0	**2.0**
Career		13	0	3.0	.318	.000	.000	.9	.2	.1	.1	1.1
