= Yi Li (basketball) =

Chinese basketball player

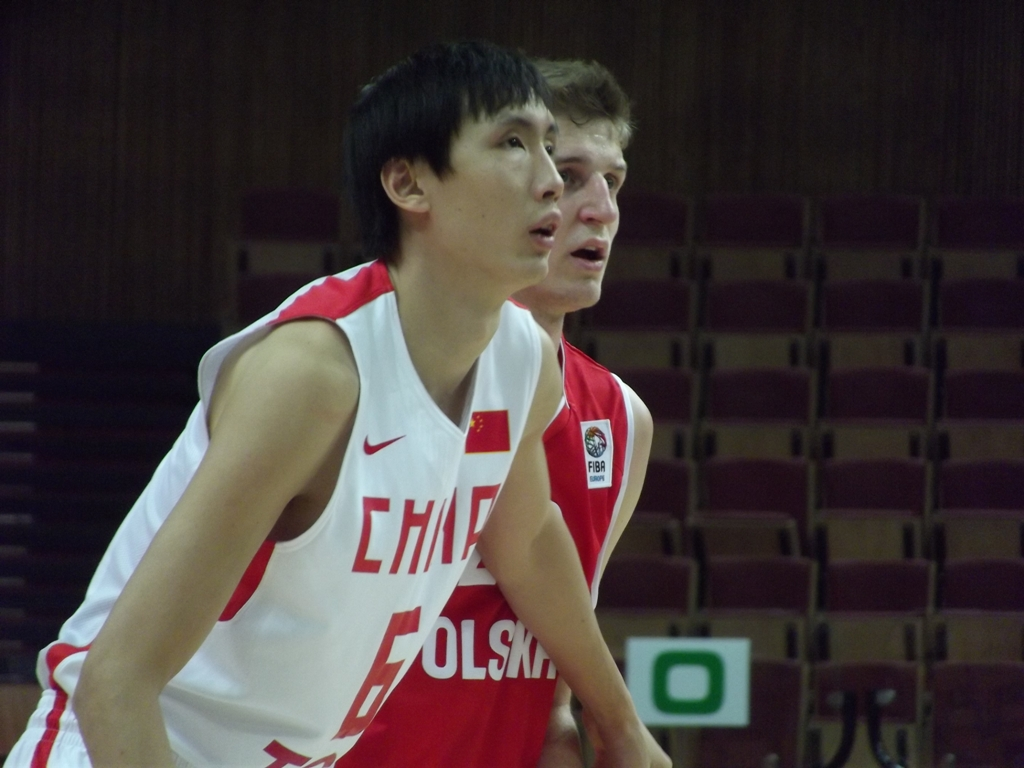

Jiangsu Dragons
- Position: Head coach
- League: Chinese Basketball Association

Personal information
- Born: November 7, 1987 (age 39) Changzhou, Jiangsu, China
- Listed height: 6 ft 8 in (2.03 m)

Career information
- Playing career: 2002–2020

Career history

Playing
- 2002–2020: Jiangsu Dragons

Coaching
- 2020–2023: Jiangsu Dragons (assistant)
- 2023–present: Jiangsu Dragons
Medals
Men's basketball
Representing China
FIBA Asia Cup
| Gold medal – first place | 2011 Wuhan |
FIBA Asia Under-18 Championship
| Gold medal – first place | 2002 Kuwait |
FIBA Asia Under-20 Championship
| Silver medal – second place | 2004 Iran |

Yi Li (Chinese: 易立; pinyin: Yì Lì; born November 7, 1987, Changzhou) is a Chinese former professional basketball player, and current head coach of the Jiangsu Dragons in the Chinese Basketball Association (CBA). As a player, he was a member of the Chinese national basketball team, and played in the 2012 Summer Olympics.
