= Zhang Kai =

Chinese basketball player

Zhang Kai 张凯
Personal information
- Born: 1 December 1982 (age 43) Wuhan, Hubei, China
- Listed height: 6.95 ft 0 in (2.12 m)

Career information
- Playing career: 1998–2019

Career history
- 2002–2019: Shenzhen Leopards

Zhang Kai (simplified Chinese: 张凯; traditional Chinese: 張凱; pinyin: zhāng kǎi), (born December 1, 1982) is a former professional basketball player from China. A centre, he played for the Dongguan Leopards of the Chinese Basketball Association (CBA). He was also a member of the Sacramento Kings' 2008–09 training camp team, but did not make the final roster.
