= Qingdao Eagles =

- League: CBA
- Founded: 2003; 23 years ago
- History: Qingdao Eagles (2003–present)
- Arena: Conson Gymnasium
- Capacity: 12,500
- Location: Qingdao, Shandong, China
- Team colors: Blue, White
- Head coach: Liu Weiwei
- Ownership: Conson (90%), DoubleStar (10%)
- Championships: None
- Retired numbers: 1 (1)
Home	Away	Third

The Qingdao Guoxin Haitian Eagle Club, also known as Qingdao Eagles, are a Chinese professional basketball team which is based in Qingdao, Shandong. Qingdao Guoxin Haitian plays in the North Division of the Chinese Basketball Association (CBA). Conson DoubleStar is the club's corporate sponsor, and the team's mascot is an eagle. In the 2012–13 season, Basketball Hall of Famer Tracy McGrady played for the club. After the season, McGrady's jersey number was retired by Qingdao.

== History ==
Qingdao Eagle received a great deal of attention from various media outlets around the world when former NBA All-Star Tracy McGrady signed for the 2012–13 CBA season with Qingdao. Despite McGrady averaging 25 points per game, the team was unable to qualify for the CBA Playoffs. In the 2014–15 CBA season, thanks to the extra addition of Hamed Haddadi, Qingdao received their first playoff appearance with the third-best record in the league, going as far as the semi-final round before being swept by the Liaoning Flying Leopards. In 2015, Qingdao retired McGrady's jersey number 1.

=== Predecessor of the team ===
The Qingdao Double Star Eagles men's basketball team is the successor of the Jinan Military Region men's basketball team, which was founded in 1959. The Jinan Military Region men's basketball team was a veteran force in China's basketball world and was known for its "hard, fast, active and accurate" play. The team won the top three in the national first-class league and the championship and runner-up was or many times. In 1995, the Jinan Military Region men's basketball team became one of the founding members of the CBA. However, the team was relegated to the NBL in 1999.

=== NBL period ===
In 2003, the Qingdao Double Star Group bought out the Jinan Military Region men's basketball team and formed the Qingdao Double Star Eagles men's basketball team. The team competed in the NBL for several years and finished third in the league in 2007 and 2008.

=== CBA period ===
The Qingdao Double Star Eagles men's basketball team was promoted to the CBA in 2009. The team has not yet won a CBA championship, but it has made the playoffs several times. In 2015, the team reached the semi-finals but was swept by the Liaoning Flying Leopards.

== Team data ==
season	Regular season (Win/Loss)	Win rate	Playoffs (win/loss)	Win rate	Season (win/loss)	Win rate	Average score	Average points conceded
2008-09	8 / 37	17.78 %	0 / 0	0 %	13 / 37	26 %	97.72	104.98
2009-10	7 / 25	21.88 %	0 / 0	0 %	7 / 25	21.88 %	99.47	106.72
2010-11	10 / 22	31.25 %	0 / 0	0 %	10 / 22	31.25 %	100.44	107.69
2011-12	16 / 16	50 %	0 / 0	0 %	16 / 16	50 %	101.44	100.53
2012-13	8 / 24	25 %	0 / 0	0 %	8 / 24	25 %	103.44	109.94
2013-14	4 / 26	13.33 %	0/ 0	0 %	5 / 29	14.71 %	102.82	114.56
2014-15	21 / 7	75 %	10 / 6	62.5 %	31 / 13	70.45 %	114.27	107.73
2015-16	11 / 16	40.74 %	0 /0	0 %	16 / 22	42.11 %	114.05	117.47
2016-17	16/22	42.1%	0/0	0%	16/22	42%	101.8	102.9

== Players ==
=== Current roster ===
Note: Flags indicate national team eligibility at FIBA-sanctioned events. Players may hold other non-FIBA nationalities not displayed.

Qingdao Conson DoubleStar Eagles roster
Players
Coaches

Pos.	No.	Nat.	Name	Ht.	Wt.	Age
G	0	(China)	Lin Weikai	1.87 m (6 ft 2 in)	86 kg (190 lb)	23 – 9 February 2003
F	2	(China)	Wang Ruize	1.97 m (6 ft 6 in)	93 kg (205 lb)	31 – 27 June 1995
G	4	(United States)	Quinndary Weatherspoon	1.91 m (6 ft 3 in)	94 kg (207 lb)	30 – 10 September 1996
G/F	6	(China)	Zhang Haobo	1.90 m (6 ft 3 in)	80 kg (176 lb)	21 – 9 February 2005
F	7	(China)	Zhang Jialin	2.03 m (6 ft 8 in)	82 kg (181 lb)	20 – 25 May 2006
G/F	8	(China)	Guo Qifang	1.91 m (6 ft 3 in)	90 kg (198 lb)	27 – 20 April 1999
SG	9	(China)	Duan Angjun	1.97 m (6 ft 6 in)	91 kg (201 lb)	23 – 28 February 2003
F	10	(China)	Zhang Yang	2.08 m (6 ft 10 in)	90 kg (198 lb)	26 – 21 February 2000
G/F	11	(China)	Cong Ruiyan	1.99 m (6 ft 6 in)	85 kg (187 lb)	19 – 28 November 2006
G	16	(China)	Wang Yibo	1.85 m (6 ft 1 in)	88 kg (194 lb)	27 – 6 January 1999
F/C	21	(China)	Hu Xiaolong	2.06 m (6 ft 9 in)	117 kg (258 lb)	23 – 17 February 2003
F/C	24	(China)	Li Junxian	2.12 m (6 ft 11 in)	112 kg (247 lb)	18 – 15 July 2008
PF	27	(China)	Lu Junhu	2.05 m (6 ft 9 in)	92 kg (203 lb)	27 – 5 January 1999
G	32	(United States)	Gabe York	1.91 m (6 ft 3 in)	94 kg (207 lb)	33 – 2 August 1993
F/C	36	(China)	Ji Zhuo	2.10 m (6 ft 11 in)	105 kg (231 lb)	25 – 7 November 2000
F/C	55	(United States)	Jordan Mickey	2.03 m (6 ft 8 in)	107 kg (236 lb)	32 – 9 July 1994

Head coach

- (China) Liu Weiwei

Assistant coach(es)

- (China) Liu Mingtao
- (China) Li Guang
- (China) Ma Bin

Legend

- (C) Team captain
- Injured

- Roster
Updated: 15 October 2026

=== Notable players ===
Note: Flags indicate national team eligibility at FIBA-sanctioned events. Players may hold other non-FIBA nationalities not displayed.

Criteria

To appear in this section a player must have either:

- Set a club record or won an individual award while at the club
- Played at least one official international match for their national team at any time
- Played at least one official NBA match at any time.

- (China) Shan Tao (2000–2001)
- (United States) Torraye Braggs (2006–2007)
- (United States) Chris Williams (2008–2010)
- (United States) Amal McCaskill (2009)
- (Lebanon) Sabah Khoury (2009–2010)
- (United States) Dee Brown (2010–2011)
- (China) Li Gen (2010–2012)
- (United States) Ivan Johnson (2011)
- (China) Xue Yuyang (2011–2014)
- (Nigeria) (United Kingdom) Olumide Oyedeji (2011–2012)
- (Belgium) (Democratic Republic of the Congo) D.J. Mbenga (2012)
- (United States) Tracy McGrady (2012–2013)
  (#1 retired by Qingdao)
- (United States) Chris Daniels (2012–2013)
- (United States) Josh Selby (2013)
- (Puerto Rico) Peter John Ramos (2013–2014)
- (United States) (Nigeria) Josh Akognon (2013–2014)
- (United States) Justin Dentmon (2014–2015)
- (Iran) Hamed Haddadi (2014–2015)
- (United States) Mike Harris (2014–2015)
- (United States) Jonathan Gibson (2015–2016, 2017–2019)
- (United States) Alan Williams (2015–2016)
- (China) Su Wei (2016–2018)
- (Greece) Loukas Mavrokefalidis (2016–2017)
- (United States) Terrence Jones (2017)
- (Poland) Maciej Lampe (2017–2018)
- (United States) (Central African Republic) James Mays (2018)
- (Bulgaria) Darius Adams (2019–2021)
- (China) Zhao Tailong (2019–2022)
- (United States) Dakari Johnson (2019–2022)
- (Australia) (South Sudan) Duop Reath (2022–2023)
- (United States) Arnett Moultrie (2023)
- (United States) Jordan Mickey (2024–present)
- (United States) Quinndary Weatherspoon (2025–present)
- (United States) Joe Young (2025–present)

=== Retired numbers ===
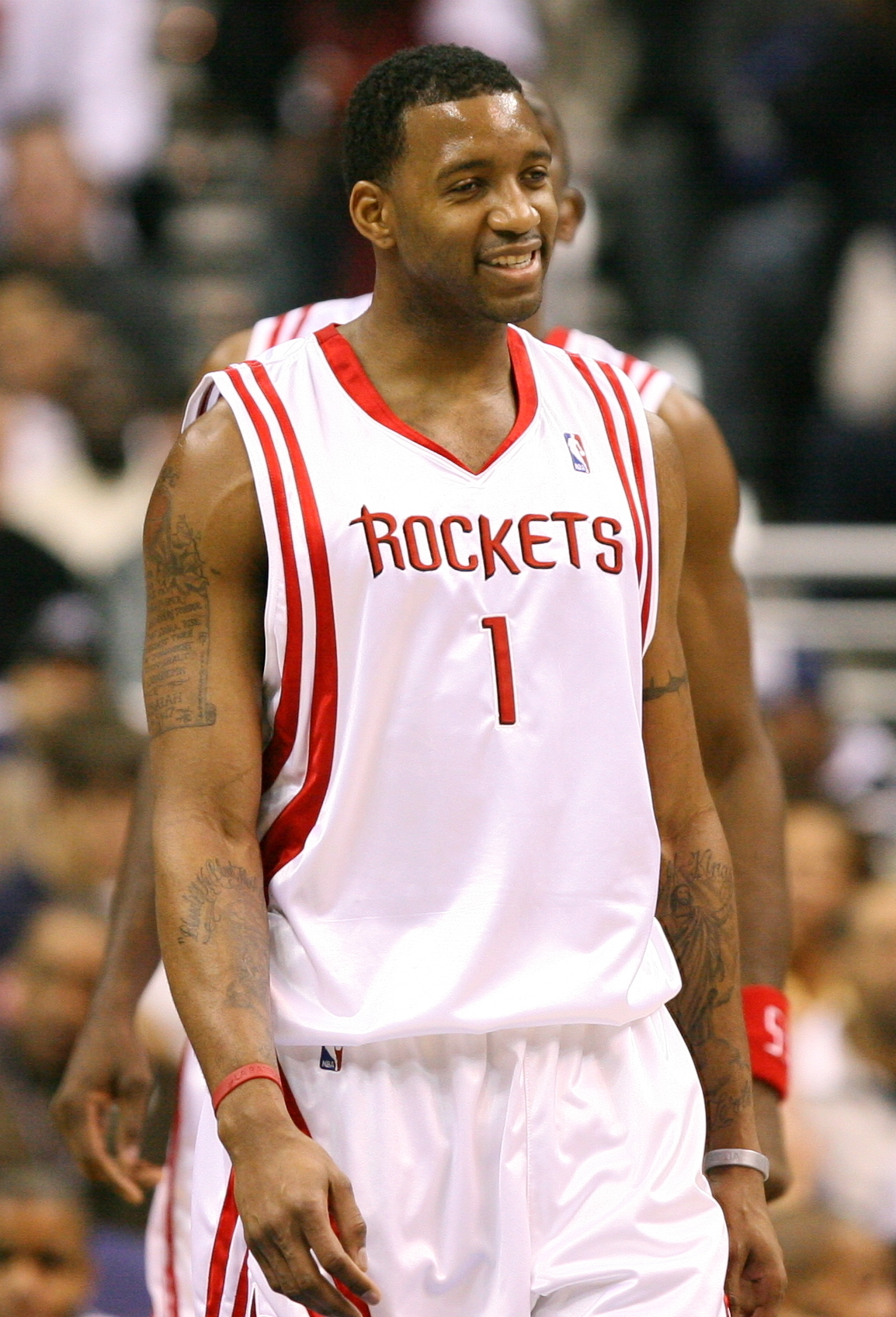
Basketball Hall of Famer Tracy McGrady was the first ever Qingdao player to get his number retired

Qingdao Eagles retired numbers
No.	Name	Position	Tenure	Year retired
1	Tracy McGrady	G/F	2012–2013	2015

=== Basketball Hall of Famers ===
Qingdao Eagles Hall of Famers
No.	Name	Position	Tenure	Inducted
1	Tracy McGrady	G/F	2012–2013	2017
