= 2010 CBA Playoffs =

The 2010 CBA Playoffs was the postseason for the Chinese Basketball Association's 2009–10 season. The playoffs started on March 24, 2010 with CCTV-5, and many local channels broadcasting the games in China. Eight teams qualified for the playoffs, all seeded 1 to 8 in a tournament bracket, with first and second round in a best-of-five format, and a final in a best-of-seven format.

== Bracket ==
Teams in bold advanced to the next round. The numbers to the left of each team indicate the team's seeding in regular season, and the numbers to the right indicate the number of games the team won in that round. Home court advantage belongs to the team with the better regular season record; teams enjoying the home advantage are shown in italics.

Quarterfinals
**1**	**Guangdong Southern Tigers**	**3**
8	Bayi Rockets	0
**4**	**Shanghai Sharks**	**3**
5	Liaoning Dinosaurs	1
**3**	**Zhejiang Lions**	**3**
6	Jiangsu Dragons	0
**2**	**Xinjiang Flying Tigers**	**3**
7	Fujian Xunxing	0

Semifinals
**1**	**Guangdong Southern Tigers**	**3**
4	Shanghai Sharks	1
3	Zhejiang Lions	0
**2**	**Xinjiang Flying Tigers**	**3**

Finals
**1**	**Guangdong Southern Tigers**	**4**
2	Xinjiang Flying Tigers	1

== Match details ==
All times are in China standard time (UTC+8)

=== Quarterfinals ===
==== (1) Guangdong Southern Tigers vs. (8) Bayi Rockets ====
GDTV

March 24
19:30

Report

**Guangdong Southern Tigers**	**109**–71	Bayi Rockets
Scoring by quarter: 27-22, 29-13, 27-14, 26-22
Pts: Zhu Fangyu 27; Rebs: David Harrison 10; Asts: Smush Parker 8		Pts: Xu Zhonghao 18; Rebs: Wang Zhizhi 10; Asts: Wang Zhongguang 3

Dongguan Arena, Dongguan
Referees: Ma Lijun, Liang Bin, Chen Yuhong

NBTV

March 26
19:30

Report

Bayi Rockets	84–**94**	**Guangdong Southern Tigers**
Scoring by quarter: 26-18, 18-27, 20-25, 20-24
Pts: Wang Zhizhi 21; Rebs: Wang Zhizhi 9 Asts: 4 players 2		Pts: Zhu Fangyu 18; Rebs: Zhu Fangyu 9 Asts: Smush Parker 7

Youngor Arena, Ningbo
Referees: Wu Minhua, Jiang Tongbiao, Zhang Yuli

NBTV
CCTV-5

March 28
19:30

Report

Bayi Rockets	83–**103**	**Guangdong Southern Tigers**
Scoring by quarter: 22-25, 10-22, 19-25, 32-31
Pts: Wang Zhizhi, Zhang Bo 18; Rebs: De Lehei 7 Asts: Wang Zhongguang 4		Pts: David Harrison 21; Rebs: Smush Parker 11; Asts: Zhu Fangyu, Wang Shipeng 3
**Guangdong win series, 3–0**

Youngor Arena, Ningbo
Referees: Wu Minhua, Liang Bin, Wang Honghua

==== (2) Xinjiang Flying Tigers vs. (7) Fujian Xunxing ====
XJTV

March 24
20:00

Report

**Xinjiang Flying Tigers**	**109**–91	Fujian Xunxing
Scoring by quarter: 29-27, 24-20, 28-20, 28-24
Pts: Xu Guochong 40; Rebs: Mengke Bateer 7 Asts: Myron Allen 9		Pts: Sean Williams 22; Rebs: Sean Williams 9 Asts: Gong Songlin 7

Hongshan Arena, Ürümqi
Referees: Wang Junzhi, He Jingzhou, Zhangjun

FJTV
CCTV-5

March 26
19:30

Report

Fujian Xunxing	72–**98**	**Xinjiang Flying Tigers**
Scoring by quarter: 26-27, 19-14, 13-31, 14-26
Pts: Yang Fenglin 18; Rebs: Chris Porter 8 Asts: Yang Qin 4		Pts: Charles Gaines 38; Rebs: Charles Gaines 13; Asts: Mengke Bateer 7

Zuchang Gymnasium, Jinjiang
Referees: Xia Chun, He Jingzhou, Yang Hongfeng

FJTV

March 28
19:30

Report

Fujian Xunxing	78–**110**	**Xinjiang Flying Tigers**
Scoring by quarter: 11-33, 19-19, 17-35, 31-23
Pts: Sean Williams 21; Rebs: Sean Williams 10; Asts: Yang Qin 4		Pts: Charles Gaines 36; Rebs: Charles Gaines 13; Asts: Mengke Bateer 6
**Xinjiang win series, 3–0**

Zuchang Gymnasium, Jinjiang
Referees: Xia Chun, He Jingzhou, Xin Yingxi

==== (3) Zhejiang Lions vs. (6) Jiangsu Dragons ====
ZJTV

March 24
19:30

Report

**Zhejiang Lions**	**109**–95	Jiangsu Dragons
Scoring by quarter: 24-26, 31-27, 25-20, 29-22
Pts: Rodney White 28; Rebs: Peter John Ramos 16; Asts: Jin Lipeng, Peter John Ramos 4		Pts: Yi Li 24; Rebs: Tang Zhengdong 15; Asts: Joe Crawford 4

Hangzhou Gymnasium, Hangzhou
Referees: Yu Bin, Xiao Jining, Qiu Hongwu

JSports

March 26
19:30

Report

Jiangsu Dragons	97–**103**	**Zhejiang Lions**
Scoring by quarter: 21-23, 30-23, 16-26, 30-31
Pts: Joe Crawford 27; Rebs: Tang Zhengdong, Yi Li 10; Asts: Yi Li 5		Pts: Rodney White 23; Rebs: Peter John Ramos 11; Asts: Wang Bo 5

Nangang Gymnasium, Nanjing
Referees: Yang Maogong, Zheng Jun, Du Xiyuan

JSports

March 28
19:30

Report

Jiangsu Dragons	100–**104**	**Zhejiang Lions**
Scoring by quarter: 28-27, 25-28, 30-22, 17-27
Pts: Joe Crawford 22; Rebs: Donnell Harvey 10; Asts: Meng Da 2		Pts: Peter John Ramos 33; Rebs: Peter John Ramos 21; Asts: Rodney White 4
**Zhejiang win series, 3–0**

Nangang Gymnasium, Nanjing
Referees: Yang Maogong, Zheng Jun, Du Xiyuan

==== (4) Shanghai Sharks vs. (5) Liaoning Dinosaurs ====
G-Sports
CCTV-5

March 24
19:45

Report

**Shanghai Sharks**	**99**–97	Liaoning Dinosaurs
Scoring by quarter: 23-15, 27-27, 18-22, 31-33
Pts: John Lucas III 34; Rebs: Zaid Abbaas 20; Asts: John Lucas III 7		Pts: Carlos Powell 33; Rebs: Olumide Oyedeji 17; Asts: Olumide Oyedeji 5

Luwan Gymnasium, Shanghai
Referees: Song Yanping, Qiao Longsheng, Sun Weibing

LNTV

March 26
19:30

Report

**Liaoning Dinosaurs**	**110**–96	Shanghai Sharks
Scoring by quarter: 24-24, 23-17, 38-24, 25-31
Pts: Zhang Qingpeng 22; Rebs: Olumide Oyedeji 11; Asts: Carlos Powell 7		Pts: John Lucas III 32; Rebs: Zaid Abbaas 12; Asts: Liu Wei 6

Tiexi Gymnasium, Shenyang
Referees: Song Yanping, Qiao Longsheng, Song Xiaojing

LNTV

March 28
19:30

Report

Liaoning Dinosaurs	73–**89**	**Shanghai Sharks**
Scoring by quarter: 10-26, 13-15, 24-30, 26-18
Pts: Carlos Powell 19; Rebs: Li Xiaoxu 12; Asts: Carlos Powell. Yang Ming 3		Pts: John Lucas III 30; Rebs: Garret Siler 15; Asts: Liu Wei, Meng Lingyuan 6

Tiexi Gymnasium, Shenyang
Referees: Ma Lijun, Qiao Longsheng, Song Xiaojing

G-Sports
CCTV-5

March 31
19:45

Report

**Shanghai Sharks**	**123**–117 (OT)	Liaoning Dinosaurs
Scoring by quarter: 20-28, 32-25, 24-27, 27-23, Overtime: 20-14
Pts: John Lucas III 41; Rebs: Garret Siler 12; Asts: John Lucas III 6		Pts: Carlos Powell 26; Rebs: Li Xiaoxu 16; Asts: Zhang Qingpeng 6
**Shanghai win series, 3–1**

Luwan Gymnasium, Shanghai
Referees: Ban Qi, Wang Zhuoping, Wang Mei

=== Semifinals ===
==== (1) Guangdong Southern Tigers vs. (4) Shanghai Sharks ====
GDTV
CCTV-5

April 4
19:30

Report

**Guangdong Southern Tigers**	**110**–106	Shanghai Sharks
Scoring by quarter: 30-28, 31-21, 27-23, 22-34
Pts: Zhu Fangyu 40; Rebs: David Harrison 14; Asts: Smush Parker 4		Pts: Liu Wei 20; Rebs: Garret Siler 9 Asts: Liu Wei 6

Dongguan Arena, Dongguan
Referees: Foreign Referee, Yang Maogong, Li Ping

GDTV

April 7
19:30

Report

Guangdong Southern Tigers	115–**126**	**Shanghai Sharks**
Scoring by quarter: 22-28, 37-18, 28-39, 28-41
Pts: Smush Parker 35; Rebs: Wang Shipeng 9 Asts: Smush Parker 5		Pts: John Lucas III 35; Rebs: Garret Siler 11; Asts: Liu Wei 7

Dongguan Arena, Dongguan
Referees: Foreign Referee, Ban Qi, Wang Xiaochun

G-Sports
CCTV-5

April 9
19:35

Report

Shanghai Sharks	94–**96**	**Guangdong Southern Tigers**
Scoring by quarter: 25-27, 24-26, 19-18, 26-25
Pts: John Lucas III 41; Rebs: Zaid Abbaas 11; Asts: Liu Wei 9		Pts: Smush Parker 33; Rebs: David Harrison 13; Asts: Wang Shipeng, Liu Xiaoyu 3

Luwan Gymnasium, Shanghai
Referees: Foreign Referee, Ma Lijun, He Jingzhou

G-Sports
CCTV-5

April 11
19:35

Report

Shanghai Sharks	75–**103**	**Guangdong Southern Tigers**
Scoring by quarter: 23-26, 13-27, 24-20, 15-30
Pts: Liu Wei 29; Rebs: Garret Siler 13; Asts: John Lucas III 4		Pts: Smush Parker, Zhu Fangyu 19; Rebs: David Harrison 12; Asts: Smush Parker 8
**Guangdong win series, 3-1**

Luwan Gymnasium, Shanghai
Referees: Foreign Referee, Ma Lijun, Jiang Zhiyuan

==== (2) Xinjiang Flying Tigers vs. (3) Zhejiang Lions ====
XJTV

April 4
20:00

Report

**Xinjiang Flying Tigers**	**96**–81	Zhejiang Lions
Scoring by quarter: 24-17, 19-19, 22-21, 31-24
Pts: Xu Guochong 29; Rebs: Charles Gaines 11; Asts: Myron Allen 5		Pts: Rodney White 30; Rebs: Rodney White 10; Asts: Rodney White 4

Hongshan Arena, Ürümqi
Referees: Foreign Referee, Yu Bin, Yan Jun

XJTV
CCTV-5

April 7
19:35

Report

**Xinjiang Flying Tigers**	**99**–89	Zhejiang Lions
Scoring by quarter: 29-15, 18-23, 23-22, 29-29
Pts: Myron Allen 33; Rebs: Mengke Bateer 10; Asts: Mengke Bateer 5		Pts: Jin Lipeng 20; Rebs: Rodney White, Peter John Ramos 7 Asts: Rodney White 5

Hongshan Arena, Ürümqi
Referees: Foreign Referee, Yu Bin, Yan Jun

ZJTV

April 9
19:30

Report

Zhejiang Lions	89–**98**	**Xinjiang Flying Tigers**
Scoring by quarter: 18-27, 24-26, 22-25, 25-20
Pts: Rodney White 32; Rebs: Peter John Ramos 11; Asts: 3 players 3		Pts: Charles Gaines 34; Rebs: Charles Gaines 11; Asts: Mengke Bateer 7
**Xinjiang win series, 3-0**

Hangzhou Gymnasium, Hangzhou
Referees: Foreign Referee, Wang Junzhi, Xia Chun

=== CBA Finals: (1) Guangdong Southern Tigers vs. (2) Xinjiang Flying Tigers ===
GDTV
CCTV-5

April 16
19:35

Report

**Guangdong Southern Tigers**	**110**–97	Xinjiang Flying Tigers
Scoring by quarter: 30-23, 27-24, 26-27, 27-23
Pts: Wang Shipeng 26; Rebs: 3 players 6 Asts: Smush Parker 6		Pts: Charles Gaines 30; Rebs: Charles Gaines 7 Asts: Myron Allen 5

Dongguan Arena, Dongguan
Referees: 2 Foreign Referees, Wu Minhua

GDTV
CCTV-5

April 18
19:35

Report

**Guangdong Southern Tigers**	**85**–80	Xinjiang Flying Tigers
Scoring by quarter: 16-24, 33-18, 21-23, 15-15
Pts: Smush Parker 26; Rebs: Smush Parker 10; Asts: Smush Parker 7		Pts: Charles Gaines 19; Rebs: Charles Gaines 17; Asts: Xiralijan Muhtar 5

Dongguan Arena, Dongguan

XJTV
CCTV-5

April 22
19:35

Report

Xinjiang Flying Tigers	112–**116** (OT)	**Guangdong Southern Tigers**
Scoring by quarter: 24-37, 20-14, 25-27, 35-26, Overtime: 8-12
Pts: Myron Allen 38; Rebs: Charles Gaines 12; Asts: Myron Allen, Xiralijan Muhtar 3		Pts: Zhu Fangyu 35; Rebs: David Harrison 7 Asts: Liu Xiaoyu 6

Hongshan Arena, Ürümqi

XJTV
CCTV-5

April 23
19:35

Report

**Xinjiang Flying Tigers**	**97**–94	Guangdong Southern Tigers
Scoring by quarter: 27-21, 14-32, 29-16, 27-25
Pts: Charles Gaines 31; Rebs: Mengke Bateer 9 Asts: Mengke Bateer 6		Pts: Zhu Fangyu 22; Rebs: Du Feng, Smush Parker 8 Asts: Smush Parker 5

Hongshan Arena, Ürümqi

GDTV
CCTV-5

April 25
19:35

Report

**Guangdong Southern Tigers**	**103**–94	Xinjiang Flying Tigers
Scoring by quarter: 26-20, 23-25, 32-15, 22-34
Pts: Zhu Fangyu 29; Rebs: David Harrison 15; Asts: Smush Parker 5		Pts: Charles Gaines 30; Rebs: Charles Gaines 11; Asts: Myron Allen 4
**Guangdong win CBA Finals, 4-1**

Dongguan Arena, Dongguan
