= Chinese Basketball Association rebounding leaders =

The Chinese Basketball Association rebounding leaders are the season by season individual rebounding leaders of the Chinese Basketball Association (CBA). The criteria set is that the player must play in a certain number of games wherein he amassed the highest possible average to lead the league in the said statistic.

These records only record after the CBA was established in 1995.

== CBA rebounding leaders ==
Season	Top Rebounder	Team	RPG
2006–07	(Senegal) Babacar Camara	Jilin Northeast Tigers	13.6
2007–08	(Mali) Soumaila Samake	Zhejiang Wanma Cyclones	15.2
2008–09	(Nigeria) Olumide Oyedeji	Shanxi Zhongyu	19.8
2009–10	(Puerto Rico) Peter John Ramos	Zhejiang Lions	13.1
2010–11	(United States) Dwyane Jones	Fujian Sturgeons	15.8
2011–12	(Jordan) Zaid Abbas	Fujian Sturgeons	14.9
2012–13	(United States) Donnell Harvey	Shandong Lions	16.6
2013–14	(United States) Charles Gaines	Shanxi Brave Dragons	14.2
2014–15	(United States) Charles Gaines (2×)	Zhejiang Golden Bulls	16.5
2015–16	(United States) Alan Williams	Qingdao DoubleStar Eagles	15.4
2016–17	(United States) Malcolm Thomas	Jilin Northeast Tigers	16.4
2017–18	(United States) Jared Sullinger	Shenzhen Leopards	16.7
2018–19	(United States) Jason Thompson	Sichuan Blue Whales	14.9
2019–20	(United States) Eric Moreland	Shanxi Loongs	14.8
2020–21	(Lithuania) Donatas Motiejūnas	Xinjiang Flying Tigers	13.7
2021–22	(Serbia) Vladimir Štimac	Ningbo Rockets	15.0
2022–23	(United States) Jared Sullinger (2×)	Shenzhen Leopards	13.6
2023–24	(United States) Alpha Kaba	Jiangsu Dragons	13.1
2024–25	(United States) Scottie James	Tianjin Pioneers	14.0
2025–26	(United States) Jordan Mickey	Qingdao Eagles	11.0
