= 2013–14 Chinese Basketball Association season =

2013–14 CBA season
- League: Chinese Basketball Association
- Sport: Basketball
- Duration: November 8, 2013 – February 16, 2014 (regular season）
- TV partner(s): CCTV-5 and many local channels.

Regular Season
- Season champions: Guangdong Southern Tigers
- Season MVP: (China) Yi Jianlian (Domestic MVP) (United States) Lester Hudson (Foreign MVP)

Playoffs

Finals
- Champions: Beijing Ducks
- Runners-up: Xinjiang Flying Tigers
- Finals MVP: (United States) Randolph Morris

CBA seasons
- ← 12–13 14–15 →

The 2013–14 CBA season is the 19th CBA season. Sichuan Blue Whales were promoted to the CBA, becoming the 18th team of the league.

The regular season began on Friday, November 8, 2013, with the Guangdong Southern Tigers hosting the Sichuan Blue Whales. The 2014 CBA All-Star Game was played on January 19, 2014, at the MasterCard Center in Beijing. The regular season ended on Sunday, February 16, 2014.

== Foreign players policy ==
All teams except Bayi Rockets can have two foreign players, while the bottom 5 teams of last season and Sichuan Blue Whales have an extra right to sign an Asian player. However, Shanghai Sharks waived their rights to sign the extra Asian player.

The rule of using players in each game is described in this chart:

#	Facing other teams	Facing Bayi Rockets
Chinese players+	No Limit	No Limit
Asian players++	No Limit	5 quarters collectively+++
International players	6 quarters collectively	5 quarters collectively+++

+ Including players from Hong Kong and Chinese Taipei.

++ If teams waive their rights to sign the extra Asian player, they may use foreign players for 7 quarters collectively.

+++ Only 1 allowed in the 4th quarter.

=== Foreign players ===
Club	Player 1	Player 2	Asian Player
Bayi Rockets	-	-	-
Beijing Ducks	(United States) Stephon Marbury (United States) Damien Wilkins	(United States) Randolph Morris	-
Dongguan Leopards	(United States) Bobby Brown	(United States) Donté Greene	-
Foshan Dralions	(United States) Gerald Fitch	(United States) Shavlik Randolph	-
Fujian Sturgeons	(United States) Delonte West	(United States) Will McDonald	(Iran) Samad Nikkhah Bahrami
Guangdong Southern Tigers	(United States) Khalif Wyatt (United States) Royal Ivey	(United States) Josh Powell	-
Jiangsu Dragons	(United States) Marcus Haislip	(United States) Jackson Vroman	-
Jilin Northeast Tigers	(United States) Leon Rodgers	(United States) Denzel Bowles	(Jordan) Sam Daghles
Liaoning Flying Leopards	(United States) Dominique Jones	(United States) Hakim Warrick	-
Qingdao Eagles	(Puerto Rico) Peter John Ramos	(Nigeria) Josh Akognon	(Palestine) Sani Sakakini
Shandong Lions	(Ukraine) (United States) Eugene Jeter	(United States) Donnell Harvey	-
Shanghai Sharks	(United States) Darnell Jackson	(United States) Quincy Douby	-
Shanxi Brave Dragons	(United States) Charles Gaines	(United States) Marcus Williams	-
Sichuan Blue Whales	(Nigeria) Michael Efevberha	(United States) D. J. White	(Iran) Hamed Haddadi
Tianjin Golden Lions	(United States) Sebastian Telfair	(United States) Shelden Williams	(Jordan) Zaid Abbas
Xinjiang Flying Tigers	(United States) Lester Hudson	(United States) James Singleton (Nigeria) (United States) Reggie Okosa	-
Zhejiang Golden Bulls	(United States) Ivan Johnson	(United States) Dewarick Spencer	-
Zhejiang Lions	(United States) Jonathan Gibson	(United States) Chris Johnson	-

== Regular Season Standings ==
#	2013–14 CBA season							
#	Team	W	L	PCT	GB	Home	Road	Tiebreaker
1	Guangdong Southern Tigers	30	4	.882	-	15–2	15–2	
2	Xinjiang Flying Tigers	26	8	.765	4	16–1	10–7	
3	Dongguan Leopards	25	9	.735	5	15–2	10–7	
4	Beijing Ducks	23	11	.676	7	15–2	8–9	
5	Zhejiang Lions	21	13	.618	9	14–3	7–10	
6	Tianjin Golden Lions	20	14	.588	10	15–2	5–12	TJ 3–1; LN 2-2; SH 1–3
7	Liaoning Dinosaurs	20	14	.588	10	14–3	6–11	TJ 3–1; LN 2-2; SH 1–3
8	Shanghai Sharks	20	14	.588	10	14–3	6–11	TJ 3–1; LN 2-2; SH 1–3
9	Shandong Lions	19	15	.559	11	13–4	6–11	
10	Fujian Sturgeons	16	18	.471	14	12–5	4–13	
11	Jiangsu Dragons	15	19	.441	15	10–7	5–12	
12	Sichuan Blue Whales	14	20	.412	16	10–7	4–13	
13	Zhejiang Golden Bulls	13	21	.382	17	11–6	2–15	
14	Jilin Northeast Tigers	12	22	.353	18	11–6	1–16	
15	Foshan Dralions	11	23	.324	19	5–12	6–11	
16	Shanxi Brave Dragons	10	24	.294	20	8–9	2–15	
17	Bayi Rockets	6	28	.176	24	6–11	0–17	
18	Qingdao Eagles	5	29	.147	25	3–14	2–15	

Key to colors
Top 8 teams advance to the Playoffs

== Playoffs ==
The playoffs of the 2013–14 CBA season started on February 18, 2014. The playoff brackets are shown below:

Quarterfinals; Best of 5
1	Guangdong Southern Tigers	3
8	Shanghai Sharks	0
4	Beijing Ducks	3
5	Zhejiang Lions	1
2	Xinjiang Flying Tigers	3
7	Liaoning Flying Leopards	1
3	Dongguan Leopards	3
6	Tianjin Golden Lions	1

Semifinals; Best of 5
1	Guangdong Southern Tigers	2
4	Beijing Ducks	3
2	Xinjiang Flying Tigers	3
3	Dongguan Leopards	0

Finals; Best of 7
4	Beijing Ducks	4
2	Xinjiang Flying Tigers	2

- Bold Series winner
- italics Team with home-court advantage

== Finals ==
The finals of 2013–14 CBA season started on March 19, 2014. Beijing Ducks and Xinjiang Flying Tigers competed for the champions in a 2-3-2 format of homes. Because Xinjiang Flying Tigers ranked higher in the regular season, they hosted Beijing Ducks in the first two games. Beijing won the first two away games. The next three games were played in Beijing with the Flying Tigers taking two out of the three to make the series 3–2 in favor of the Ducks. In the sixth game at Urumqi, Beijing defeated Xinjiang with a score of 98-88 and secured their second CBA Championship.

The scores of the six games are as follows:

Date	Result	Host Arena	Host city
March 19, 2014	Xinjiang 75 vs 95 Beijing	Hongshan Arena	Ürümqi
March 21, 2014	Xinjiang 86 vs 90 Beijing	Hongshan Arena	Ürümqi
March 23, 2014	Beijing 81 vs 92 Xinjiang	MasterCard Center	Beijing
March 26, 2014	Beijing 94 vs 88 Xinjiang	MasterCard Center	Beijing
March 28, 2014	Beijing 80 vs 83 Xinjiang	MasterCard Center	Beijing
March 30, 2014	Xinjiang 88 vs 98 Beijing	Hongshan Arena	Ürümqi

== Statistical leaders ==
=== Individual statistical leaders ===
Category	Player	Team	Statistics
Points per game	(United States) Jonathan Gibson	Zhejiang Lions	31.7
Rebounds per game	(United States) Charles Gaines	Shanxi Brave Dragons	14.1
Assists per game	(Jordan) Osama Daghles	Jilin Northeast Tigers	8.3
Steals per game	(United States) Ivan Johnson	Zhejiang Golden Bulls	2.6
Blocks per game	(China) Zhang Zhaoxu	Shanghai Sharks	2.4
Minutes per game	(Iran) Samad Nikkhah Bahrami	Fujian SBS Sturgeons	41.9

== Awards ==
=== Players of the week ===
The following players were named the Domestic and Foreign Players of the Week.

Week	Domestic Player	Foreign Player	Ref.
1	Yi Jianlian (Guangdong Southern Tigers)	(United States) Shavlik Randolph (Foshan Dralions)	
2	Yi Jianlian (Guangdong Southern Tigers) (2)	(United States) Charles Gaines (Shanxi Brave Dragons)	
3	Wang Zhelin (Fujian Sturgeons)	(United States) Shelden Williams (Tianjin Golden Lions)	
4	Wang Zhelin (Fujian Sturgeons) (2)	(United States) Randolph Morris (Beijing Ducks)	
5	Wang Zhelin (Fujian Sturgeons) (3)	(United States) Lester Hudson (Xinjiang Flying Tigers)	
6	Wang Zhelin (Fujian Sturgeons) (4)	(United States) Dominique Jones (Liaoning Flying Leopards)	
7	Yi Jianlian (Guangdong Southern Tigers) (3)	(United States) Marcus Williams (Shanxi Brave Dragons)	
8	Yi Jianlian (Guangdong Southern Tigers) (4)	(United States) Shelden Williams (Tianjin Golden Lions) (2)	
9	Wang Zhelin (Fujian Sturgeons) (5)	(Iran) Samad Nikkhah Bahrami (Fujian Sturgeons)	
10	Yi Jianlian (Guangdong Southern Tigers) (5)	(Nigeria) Michael Efevberha (Sichuan Blue Whales)	
11	Sun Yue (Beijing Ducks)	(United States) Marcus Haislip (Jiangsu Dragons)	
12	Yi Jianlian (Guangdong Southern Tigers) (6)	(United States) Jonathan Gibson (Zhejiang Lions)	
