= 2025 Shanghai Masters =

2025 invitational snooker tournament

Tournament information
- Dates: 28 July – 3 August 2025
- Venue: Luwan Gymnasium
- City: Shanghai
- Country: China
- Organisation: World Snooker Tour; CBSA
- Format: Non-ranking event
- Total prize fund: £825,000
- Winner's share: £210,000
- Highest break: Zhang Anda (CHN) (147)

Final
- Champion: Kyren Wilson (ENG)
- Runner-up: Ali Carter (ENG)
- Score: 11–9

The 2025 Shanghai Masters was a professional non-ranking snooker tournament that took place from 28 July to 3 August 2025 at the Luwan Gymnasium in Shanghai, China. Part of the 2025–26 snooker season, it was the 16th edition of the Shanghai Masters since the tournament was first staged in 2007 and the fifth edition since the tournament became an invitational event in 2018. The tournament was broadcast by local channels in Asia; by Eurosport, Discovery+, and HBO Max in Europe; by TNT Sports and Discovery+ in the United Kingdom and Ireland; and by WST Play in all other territories. The winner received £210,000 from a total prize fund of £825,000.

A total of 24 players—comprising the top 16 players in the world rankings, the four highest-ranked Chinese players outside the top 16, and four Chinese wildcard players—were invited to participate. The world number 10 Mark Allen withdrew and was replaced by the world number 17 Ali Carter. Judd Trump was the defending champion, having defeated Shaun Murphy 11–5 in the 2024 final, but he lost 4–6 to Mark Selby in the quarter-finals. Kyren Wilson won the tournament, beating Carter 11–9 in the final to claim his second Shanghai Masters title, following his previous win at the 2015 event. He became the third player to win the tournament multiple times, after Ding Junhui and Ronnie O'Sullivan.

The tournament produced 56 century breaks, of which the highest was a maximum break by Zhang Anda, the fourth of his career, in his second-round match against Ding. It was the second maximum of the season and the 219th official maximum in professional snooker history. The second-round match between Wilson and Si Jiahui produced six century breaks, three by each player, which equalled the record for the most centuries in a best-of-11 match. Ding made the 700th century break of his professional career during the tournament, and Barry Hawkins made his 500th career century.

== Overview ==
The inaugural 2007 Shanghai Masters was won by Dominic Dale, who trailed 2–6 in the final against Ryan Day, only to win eight consecutive frames for a 10–6 victory. Staged as a ranking event from 2007 to 2017, the Shanghai Masters became a non-ranking invitational event in 2018, comprising 24 players. As of 2025, Ronnie O'Sullivan was the tournament's most successful player, having won the title five times, in 2009, 2017, 2018, 2019, and 2023. Judd Trump was the defending champion, having defeated Shaun Murphy 11–5 in the 2024 final to win the title for the first time.

=== Participants ===
The 2025 edition featured the top 16 players in the world rankings, with the exception of the world number 10 Mark Allen, who withdrew from the event for family reasons and was replaced in the draw by the world number 17 Ali Carter. It also featured the four highest-ranked Chinese players outside the top 16 (Lei Peifan, Pang Junxu, Wu Yize, and Yuan Sijun) and four Chinese wildcard players. The co-organiser of the tournament, the Chinese Billiards and Snooker Association (CBSA), nominated two top domestically ranked players as wildcards. Another two wildcards were finalists at an open qualifier event held at Shanghai Plaza from 4 to 13 July. During the opening ceremony, the four wildcard players, Fuyuan, Qiu Lei, Wang Xinbo, and Zhou Jinhao, were drawn at random to play Shaun Murphy, Carter, Si Jiahui, and Chris Wakelin respectively.

=== Format ===
The tournament took place from 28 July to 3 August 2025 at the Luwan Gymnasium in Shanghai, China. The top eight seeds received byes to the last 16. All remaining players started in the first round. All matches up to and including the quarter-finals were played as the best of 11 frames. The semi-finals were played as the best of 19 frames. The final was the best of 21 frames.

=== Broadcasters ===
The tournament was broadcast by TNT Sports and Discovery+ in the United Kingdom and Ireland. It was broadcast by Eurosport in mainland Europe; by Discovery+ in Germany, Italy, and Austria; and by HBO Max in other European territories. It was broadcast by Migu, Huya, the CBSA-WPBSA Academy WeChat channel, and CBSA-WPBSA Academy Douyin in mainland China; by Now TV in Hong Kong; by Astro SuperSport in Malaysia; by TrueSports in Thailand; by Sportcast in Taiwan; and by TAP Sports in the Philippines. In all other territories, it was broadcast by WST Play.

=== Prize fund ===
The total prize fund was £825,000, with the winner receiving £210,000. The breakdown of prize money is shown below:

- Winner: £210,000
- Runner-up: £105,000
- Semi-final: £70,000
- Quarter-final: £35,000
- Last 16: £17,500
- Last 24: £10,000
- Highest break: £10,000
- Total: £825,000

== Summary ==
=== First round ===
The four wildcard players and the four Chinese players ranked outside the top 16 all lost in the first round. Chris Wakelin, competing in the tournament for the first time, made three half-century breaks as he defeated 17-year-old Zhou Jinhao 6–3, while Shaun Murphy made five half-centuries as he whitewashed Han Fuyuan. Ali Carter defeated Qiu Lei 6–1, and Si Jiahui advanced with a 6–4 win over Wang Xinbo. Barry Hawkins made his 500th century break in professional competition as he defeated Wu Yize 6–4, becoming the 15th player in professional snooker history to reach that milestone. Neil Robertson beat Pang Junxu 6–2, and Zhang Anda defeated Yuan Sijun in a deciding frame. Xiao Guodong made back-to-back centuries of 143 (the highest of the first round) and 120 as he defeated Lei Peifan 6–3.

=== Last 16 ===
Facing two-time runner-up Murphy, the eighth seed Mark Selby won the first frame with a 66 break and took the second on the colours after Murphy missed the brown and hit the black, conceding a free ball. Selby then made breaks of 115, 81, 73, and 137 as he completed a 6–0 whitewash, with Murphy having scored only 52 points in the match. The match between the third seed Kyren Wilson and Si produced six century breaks—120, 114, and 114 by Wilson and 124, 139, and 127 by Si—which equalled the record for the most centuries in a best-of-11 match. The record had been set by Neil Robertson and Judd Trump at the 2016 Masters and previously equalled by Neil Robertson and Selby at the 2020 Champion of Champions. Si led 3–1, 4–3, and 5–4, but Wilson made an 83 break in the 10th frame to force a decider, which he won with a 97 break. Wilson missed a so-called "no-look" shot on the last black of the match, not realising that potting it would have set a new record of seven centuries. However, he said afterwards: "You have to have a bit of fun. The crowd appreciate that sort of thing."

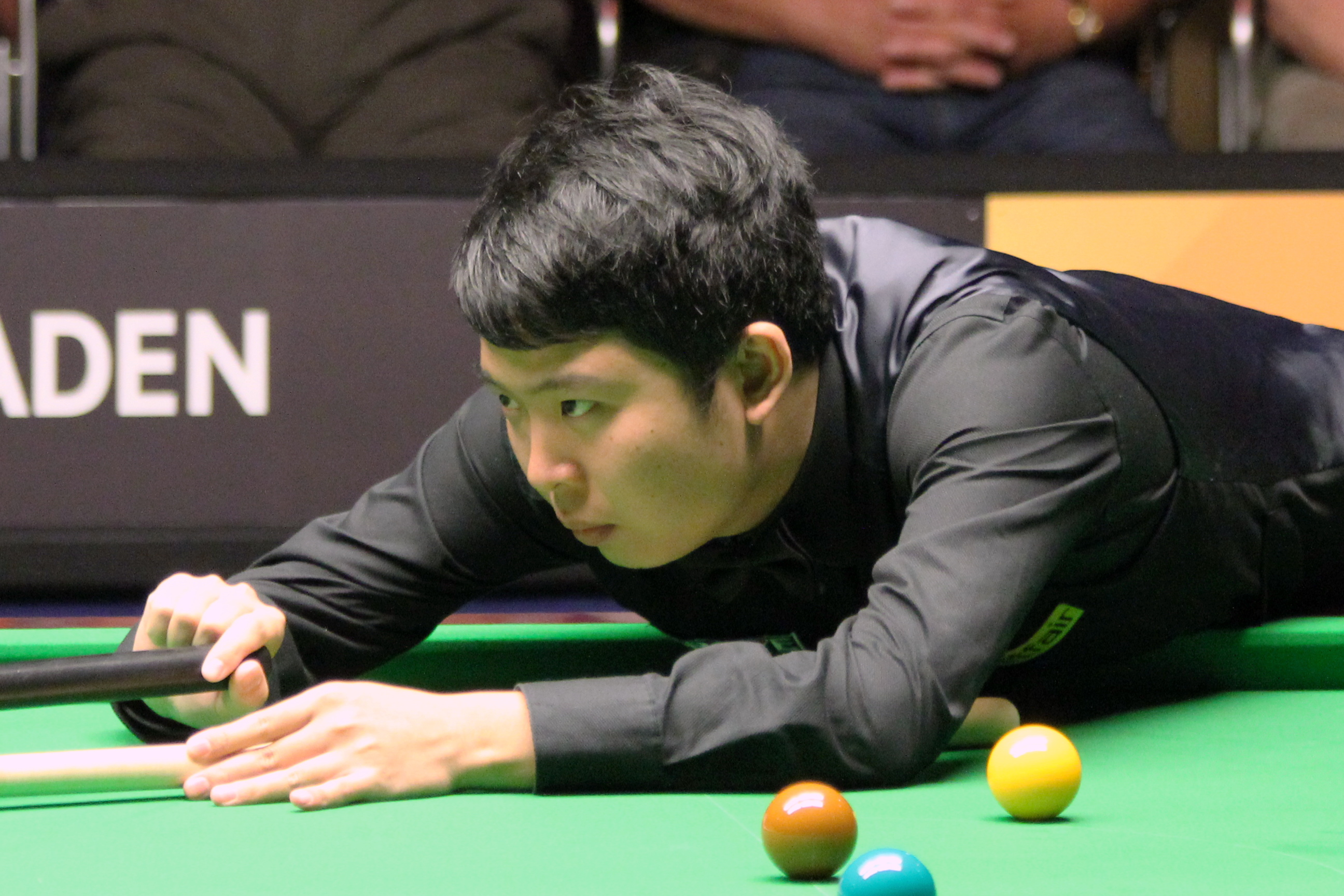
Zhang Anda (pictured in 2012) made the fourth maximum break of his career in his last-16 match against Ding Junhui.

The seventh seed Ding Junhui won four of the first five frames against Zhang, making two centuries, including his 700th career century. In the sixth frame, Zhang made a maximum break, the fourth of his career, the second of the season, the fourth in the tournament's history, and the 219th official maximum in professional competition. Ding won the seventh frame to lead 5–2, but Zhang then won three consecutive frames, making a second century of 120 in frame nine, as he tied the scores at 5–5. Ding won the deciding frame on the colours. Facing Robertson, Trump made back-to-back centuries in the first two frames and went on to secure a 6–2 victory.

Carter made a 131 century to win the opening frame of his match against the fourth seed Mark Williams but lost five of the next six to trail 2–5. However, Carter produced breaks of 93, 78, and 87 to force a deciding frame, which he won with a total clearance of 132. Xiao made three centuries of 104, 111, and 113 as he came from 0–2 behind to defeat the fifth seed John Higgins 6–4. Zhao Xintong, playing in his first match since winning the 2025 World Championship, was tied at 2–2 with Wakelin at the mid-session interval. Zhao then made breaks of 103, 65, 73, and 59 as he won four consecutive frames for a 6–2 victory. Facing Hawkins, the five-time winner and sixth seed Ronnie O'Sullivan made breaks of 94, 94, 54, 90, and 89 as he moved into a 5–3 lead. Hawkins responded with breaks of 88 and 106 to force a deciding frame, but O'Sullivan won the decider with a 67 break. Afterwards, O'Sullivan called the performance his best since winning the 2022 World Championship.

=== Quarter-finals ===
Despite making three centuries of 104, 108, and 102, the defending champion Trump lost 4–6 to Selby, who made a 137 break in frame five. Xiao also made three centuries, 121, 106, and 102, as he took a 5–2 lead over Carter. However, Carter made breaks of 72, 92, and 87 to force a deciding frame, which he won. It was the second consecutive best-of-11 match Carter had won from 2–5 behind.

O'Sullivan took the first frame against Wilson and tied the scores to force a respotted black in the second, but Wilson potted the black to win the frame. O'Sullivan required a snooker in the third but obtained the penalty points he needed, helped by a free ball, and moved 2–1 ahead. However, Wilson took five of the next six frames as he secured a 6–3 win, having made two centuries and five half-centuries in the match. It was Wilson's third consecutive victory over O'Sullivan. Zhao made three centuries of 134, 132, and 118 as he defeated Ding 6–1 in less than an hour and a half, averaging 17.5 seconds per shot.

=== Semi-finals ===
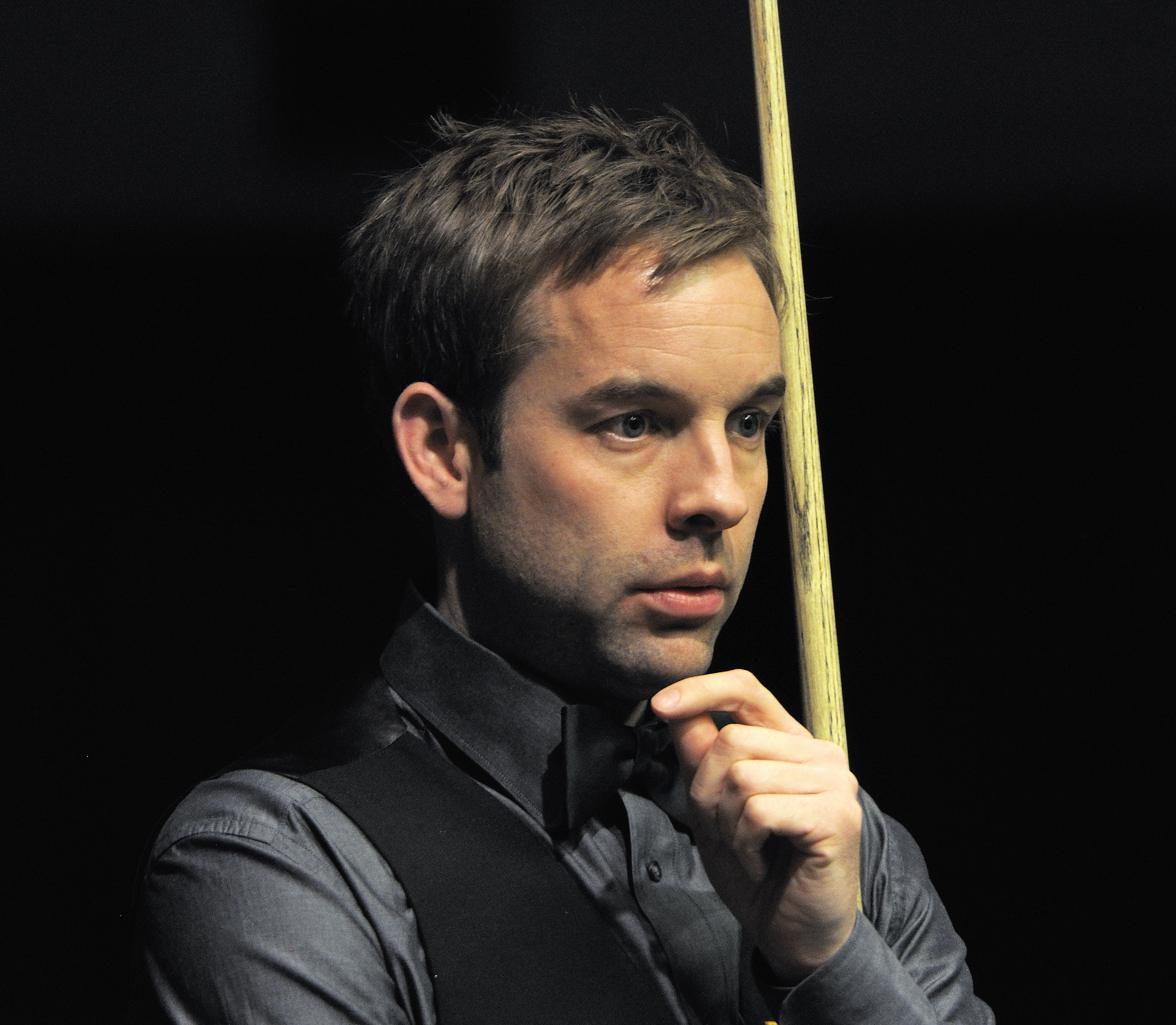
Ali Carter (pictured in 2013) replaced Mark Allen, who withdrew. He came from 2–5 behind in the last 16 and quarter-finals, and from 6–8 behind in the semi-finals, to reach his second Shanghai Masters final.

The semi-finals were played as the best of 19 frames over two sessions. Selby faced Carter in the first semi-final. The first four frames were shared, as Selby made two 85 breaks and Carter made breaks of 76 and 60. Carter had an opportunity to win frame five by potting pink and black, but he went in-off the pink while using the rest, and Selby won the frame for a 3–2 lead. Carter tied the scores with a 102 century. Selby made an 80 break to take frame seven, but Carter won the last two frames of the session for a 5–4 advantage. Selby won the first two frames of the second session with breaks of 108 and 81, but Carter made a 129 century in frame 12 to tie the scores at 6–6. Selby made breaks of 91 and 62 to lead 8–6, but missed a blue in the 15th frame that allowed Carter to take the frame with a 66 break. Carter added breaks of 83, 62, and 79 to win four consecutive frames and secure a 10–8 victory. "I love Shanghai, I love the city and I love the tournament," said Carter afterwards.

The two most recent world champions, Wilson and Zhao, contested the second semi-final. Zhao made a 113 century in frame four to tie the scores at 2–2, and the scores were level again at 3–3 and 4–4. Zhao produced a 121 century in frame nine to end the first session 5–4 ahead. In the second session, Zhao was leading by 23 points in the 10th frame when play was briefly suspended due to a technical issue with the arena's scoreboard. Wilson won the frame when the players returned, and went on to take six consecutive frames, making breaks including 70, 101, and 51 as he secured a 10–5 victory. Losing to Wilson ended Zhao's 26-match winning streak since his last defeat by Murphy at the 2024 UK Championship. "Snooker in China is booming and you can feel an extra air of expectation every time Zhao turns up for a game," Wilson said afterwards. "I knew I had to play well and shut that out."

=== Final ===
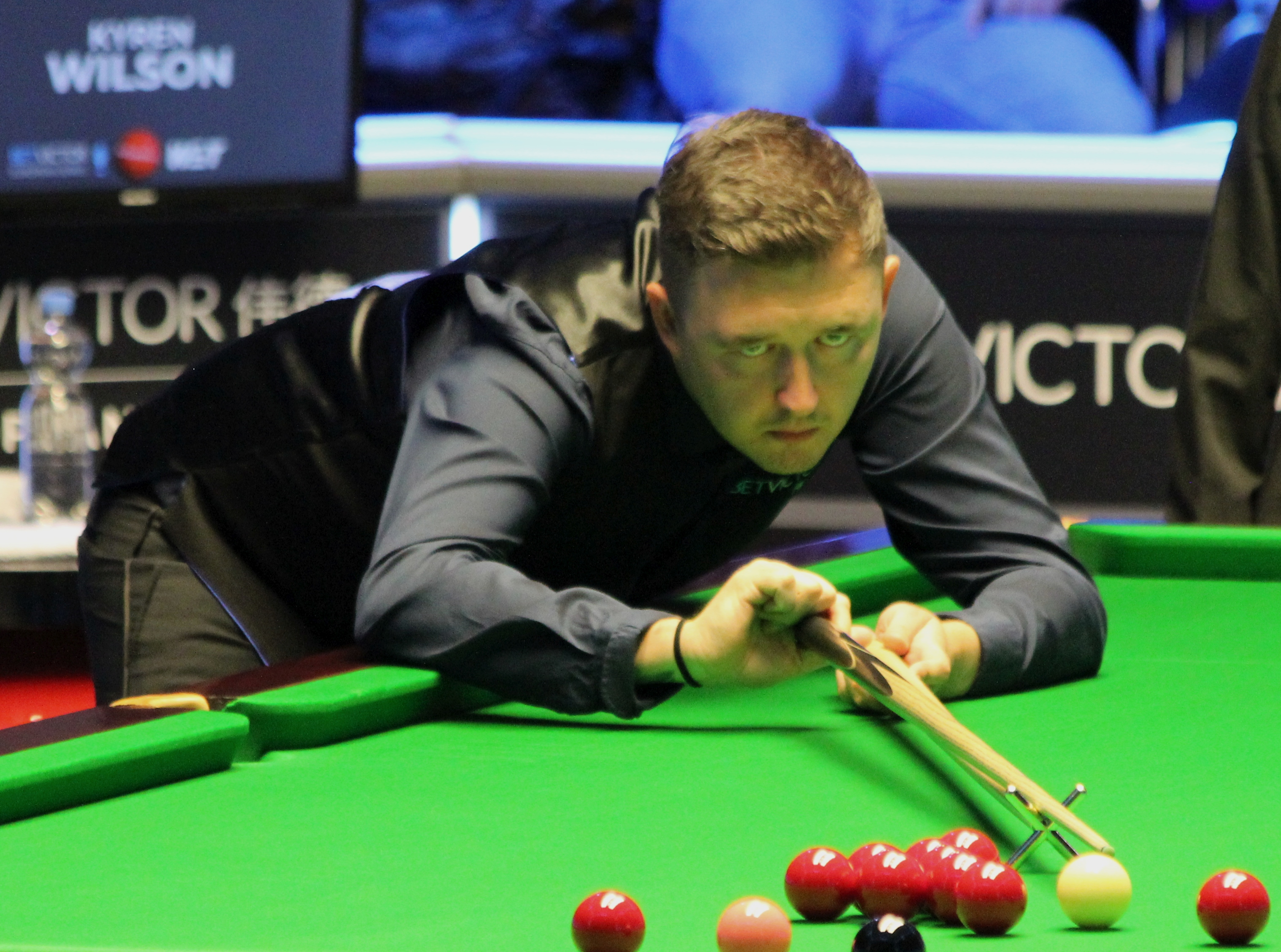
Kyren Wilson (pictured in 2022) defeated Ali Carter 11–9 in the final to win his second Shanghai Masters title.

The final was played as the best of 21 frames over two sessions on 3 August between the world number 2 Wilson and the world number 17 Carter. Both players were competing in their second Shanghai Masters final, Carter having won the title in 2010 and Wilson in 2015. Carter made a 68 break to win the opening frame, but Wilson took the next two with breaks of 129 and 96. Carter won two consecutive frames with breaks of 86 and 65 to lead 3–2, but Wilson then won three in a row with breaks of 51, 80, and 78 to lead 5–3. Carter won the last two frames of the session with breaks of 68 and 66 to tie the scores at 5–5.

When the match resumed, Wilson won two consecutive frames, making a 105 century in frame 12, but Carter also won two in a row, making a 76 break in frame 13, as he tied the scores at 7–7. Wilson again moved two frames in front with breaks of 66 and 122, but Carter produced breaks of 140 and 63 as he levelled at 9–9. Wilson made an 86 clearance to move 10–9 ahead. Wilson cleared from the last red to win the 20th frame by one point, securing an 11–9 victory and his second Shanghai Masters title. He became the third player to win the tournament multiple times, following Ding and O'Sullivan. "I knew I had to take out that clearance at the end," Wilson said afterwards. "Fatigue was starting to slip in. I didn't want to face [Carter] in a final frame because his success rate in deciders this week has been fantastic. He is a great champion and made it really difficult all day long." Carter commented: "It was a really tough game. I felt I hung in there all day. I didn't feel I played particularly great, but I was pleased to compete with a World Champion like [Wilson]. I felt if I'd had a bit of a tailwind at some point I'd have probably won."

== Tournament draw ==
The tournament results for the event are shown below. Numbers in parentheses after the players' names denote their seeding, an "a" indicates amateur status for the four wildcards, and players in bold denote match winners.

**Round 1** Best of 11 frames
**Neil Robertson (AUS)**	**6**
Pang Junxu (CHN)	2
**Shaun Murphy (ENG)**	**6**
Han Fuyuan (CHN) (a)	0
**Xiao Guodong (CHN)**	**6**
Lei Peifan (CHN)	3
**Ali Carter (ENG) (Note: Ali Carter (ranked 17th) replaced Mark Allen (ranked 10th), who withdrew for personal reasons.)**	**6**
Qiu Lei (CHN) (a)	1
**Si Jiahui (CHN)**	**6**
Wang Xinbo (CHN) (a)	4
**Barry Hawkins (ENG)**	**6**
Wu Yize (CHN)	4
**Zhang Anda (CHN)**	**6**
Yuan Sijun (CHN)	5
**Chris Wakelin (ENG)**	**6**
Zhou Jinhao (CHN) (a)	3

**Last 16**; Best of 11 frames
**Judd Trump (ENG) (1)**	**6**
Neil Robertson (AUS)	2
**Mark Selby (ENG) (8)**	**6**
Shaun Murphy (ENG)	0
John Higgins (SCO) (5)	4
**Xiao Guodong (CHN)**	**6**
Mark Williams (WAL) (4)	5
**Ali Carter (ENG)**	**6**
**Kyren Wilson (ENG) (3)**	**6**
Si Jiahui (CHN)	5
**Ronnie O'Sullivan (ENG) (6)**	**6**
Barry Hawkins (ENG)	5
**Ding Junhui (CHN) (7)**	**6**
Zhang Anda (CHN)	5
**Zhao Xintong (CHN) (2)**	**6**
Chris Wakelin (ENG)	2

**Quarter-finals**; Best of 11 frames
Judd Trump (ENG) (1)	4
**Mark Selby (ENG) (8)**	**6**
Xiao Guodong (CHN)	5
**Ali Carter (ENG)**	**6**
**Kyren Wilson (ENG) (3)**	**6**
Ronnie O'Sullivan (ENG) (6)	3
Ding Junhui (CHN) (7)	1
**Zhao Xintong (CHN) (2)**	**6**

**Semi-finals**; Best of 19 frames
Mark Selby (ENG) (8)	8
**Ali Carter (ENG)**	**10**
**Kyren Wilson (ENG) (3)**	**10**
Zhao Xintong (CHN) (2)	5

**Final**; Best of 21 frames
Ali Carter (ENG)	9
**Kyren Wilson (ENG) (3)**	**11**

=== Final: frame scores ===
Final
Final: Best of 21 frames. Referee: Zheng Weili; Luwan Gymnasium in Shanghai, China, 3 August 2025
Ali Carter; England	9–**11**	**Kyren Wilson** (3); England
Afternoon: **103**–7, 7–**129** (129), 7–**109**, **87**–0, **90**–0, 31–**65**, 1–**82**, 0–**78**, **69**–15, **66**–1; Evening: 27–**70**, 0–**105** (105), **76**–0, **63**–0, 14–**83**, 0–**122** (122), **140**–0 (140), **90**–0, 7–**126**, 56–**57**
(frame 17) **140**	Highest break	129 (frame 2)
1	Century breaks	**3**

== Century breaks ==
A total of 56 century breaks were made during the tournament.

- 147, 139, 120, 116 – Zhang Anda
- 143, 121, 120, 113, 111, 106, 104, 102 – Xiao Guodong
- 140, 132, 131, 129, 116, 102 – Ali Carter
- 139, 127, 124, 118, 110 – Si Jiahui
- 137, 137, 115, 108 – Mark Selby
- 137, 102 – Neil Robertson
- 134, 132, 121, 118, 113, 103 – Zhao Xintong
- 131 – Pang Junxu
- 129, 122, 120, 114, 114, 111, 109, 105, 101 – Kyren Wilson
- 127, 125, 108, 104, 103, 102 – Judd Trump
- 124 – Mark Williams
- 107, 106 – Ding Junhui
- 106, 102 – Barry Hawkins
