= Charles Gaines (basketball) =

American basketball player (born 1981)

Charles W. Gaines
Personal information
- Born: October 15, 1981 (age 45) Houston, Texas
- Listed height: 6 ft 8 in (2.03 m)
- Listed weight: 250 lb (113 kg)

Career information
- High school: Klein Forest (Houston, Texas)
- College: Missouri State (1999–2001); Southern Miss (2002–2004)
- NBA draft: 2004: undrafted
- Playing career: 2004–2019
- Position: Forward / center

Career history
- 2004–2005: Michigan Mayhem
- 2005: Viola Reggio Calabria
- 2005–2006: ASVEL
- 2006–2007: Joventut Badalona
- 2007–2008: Galatasaray
- 2008–2009: Austin Toros
- 2009: Maccabi Tel Aviv
- 2009–2010: Xinjiang Flying Tigers
- 2010–2011: Qingdao Eagles
- 2011–2014: Shanxi Brave Dragons
- 2014–2016: Zhejiang Golden Bulls
- 2017: Shaanxi Wolves
- 2018: Anhui Dragons

Career highlights
- NBL champion (2017); 2× CBA rebounding champion (2014–2015); 2× First-team All-CBA (2010, 2011); 2× Second-team All-CBA (2013, 2015); Chinese Basketball Association All-Star (2012); Chinese Basketball Association scoring leader (2011); Continental Basketball Association rebounding leader (2005); Continental Basketball Association All-Star (2005); Second-Team All-Conference USA (2004); Third-Team All-Conference USA (2003)

Charles Wayne Gaines (born October 15, 1981) is an American former professional basketball player. He played high school basketball in his native city of Houston, and he spent two years at Southwest Missouri State in the MVC before transferring to Southern Miss, where he played his two remaining years of college basketball eligibility. After going undrafted in the 2004 NBA draft, he started his professional career in the Continental Basketball Association with the Michigan Mayhem, leading the league in rebounding. After several years in Europe (Italy, France, Spain and Turkey), one year in the NBA D-League and one in Israel, Gaines moved to the Chinese Basketball Association. While in China he earned an All-Star selection, was the 2011 scoring champion, and he twice led the league in rebounding (2014 and 2015).

== High school career ==
Gaines was born in Houston, Texas and attended Klein Forest High School, where he was a member of the varsity basketball team. He showed significant improvement during his final two seasons at Klein Forest: during his junior season, he tied the school record for points scored in a single game with 38. As a senior he stood at 6-foot-7 and weighed 200 pounds: he averaged 20.6 points, 8.7 rebounds and 3 blocks per game, contributing to the team's 20–12 record. He was also named district 5A MVP in his senior year.

== College career ==
=== Southwest Missouri State ===
Gaines signed to play for Southwest Missouri State, the first recruit brought to the program by newly appointed coach Barry Hinson. He could play multiple positions, and was projected to be mainly used as a forward, though he could also cover the shooting guard spot. During his freshman season Gaines played 32 games. On December 11, 1999, he scored 11 points against Texas Christian; he then recorded a then career-best 12 points on January 12, 2000, playing against Wichita State, while his season best in rebounding came on December 29 when he recorded 9 against Creighton. He ended the season with averages of 3 points, 2.1 rebounds, 0.1 assists and 0.7 blocks, having played all of his 32 games coming off the bench.

Gaines' sophomore year started with a new career-best 16-point performance against New Orleans on November 18, 2000. During the following game against North Texas, Gaines recorded 15 rebounds, a new career high. Throughout the season, Gaines was the team's top rebounder in 10 of the 29 games he played (21 starts), and in 4 occasions he was the team's top scorer. He led the team in blocks with 1.1 per game, and was also the second best rebounder behind Mike Wallace, with an average of 6.2 per game. His sophomore season averages were 8.3 points, 6.2 rebounds, 0.6 assists and 1.1 blocks.

=== Southern Miss ===
After his second season at Southwest Missouri State, Gaines decided to transfer to another program. He made contact with Luster Goodwin, the assistant coach of Southern Miss, and decided to move to Southern Miss: as a result, he had to sit out a year as per NCAA transfer rules. During the season he sat out he trained with the team, working on his conditioning.

He was cleared to play for the 2002–03 season, and he was selected as a starter. In his first year at Southern Miss he recorded 278 total rebounds, which ranked 6th best in Southern Miss history for rebounds in a season. On November 22, 2002, against Alcorn State Gaines scored 33 points, and on November 25, 2002, against Jackson State he scored 34 points, a new career high and one of the top scoring games in Southern Miss history. He ended the season with 29 appearances as a starter and was the team's top scorer, with an average of 15.1 points per game, and the best rebounder with 9.6 per game; his performance earned him a selection in the All-Conference USA third team.

Gaines' senior season saw him record career-best numbers in all the major statistical categories. In 28 appearances he played 31.4 minutes per game, averaging 15.7 points, 10.4 rebounds, 0.8 assists, 1.2 steals and 1.3 blocks per game: he led his team in both scoring and rebounding. On December 17, 2003, he scored 36 points against Georgia Southern, one of the best single-game scores in Southern Miss history. For the second year in a row he was an all-conference selection, this time making the All-Conference USA second team.

== Professional career ==
=== CBA and Europe ===
After the end of his senior season, Gaines was automatically eligible for the 2004 NBA draft, during which he went undrafted. He was selected with the 4th pick in the 8th round of the 2004 National Basketball Development League draft by the Huntsville Flight (46th overall), but instead of signing with the team Gaines decided to join the Michigan Mayhem, which played in the Continental Basketball Association: in the 2004–05 season he played 44 games (30 starts) and averaged 18.3 points, 11.4 rebounds, 0.7 assists, 1.2 steals and 0.5 blocks per game. He was named a CBA All-Star and was the league's rebounding leader. He then moved to Italy, and joined Serie A side Viola Reggio Calabria, playing 9 games and averaging 14.4 points and 8.8 rebounds in 28.3 minutes per game. In 2005 he also played for the Minot Minutemen of the All-American Professional Basketball League.

Gaines moved to France for the 2005 06 season, signing for ASVEL. He played 33 LNB Pro A games (30 starts), averaging 13.6 points, 8.1 rebounds and 1.1 assists in 28.6 minutes per game. He also played 14 games in the 2005–06 ULEB Cup, averaging 12 points and 8.1 rebounds per game.

In 2006 he played in the Orlando Summer League for the Indiana Pacers, appearing in 5 games and averaging 4.2 points and 1.8 rebounds in 11.2 minutes per game. He then moved to Spain, joining Joventut Badalona and played 34 games (30 starts), averaging 11.1 points, 7.8 rebounds and 0.7 assists in 25.7 minutes per game. He won ACB Player of the Month Award in March 2007 and finished the 2006–07 ACB season as the 5th best rebounder with an average of 7.8 per game. He also made his debut in the Euroleague, and played 20 games during the 2006–07 Euroleague averaging 10.3 points and 6.3 rebounds per game.

In the summer of 2007 he was called up by the Orlando Magic to play in the Orlando Summer League: in 3 games played he posted averages of 6.3 points 3.3 rebounds per game. Later that year he signed for Galatasaray in the Turkish Basketball League. He played 28 games that season, averaging 12.9 points, 8.1 rebounds and 0.9 assists playing 25.7 minutes per game. He also appeared in the 2007–08 ULEB Cup, playing 17 games with averages of 12.4 points and 7.3 rebounds.

=== D-League and Israel ===
On October 1, 2008, Gaines was signed by the San Antonio Spurs. He did not make the final roster and was sent to the Austin Toros, the Spurs' D League team. He played 23 games (21 starts) for the Toros, averaging 15.1 points, 7.2 rebounds, 0.7 assists, 1 steal and 0.7 blocks in 36.4 minutes per game.

In 2009 he joined Maccabi Tel Aviv, and played 9 games in the Israeli league (4 starts), averaging 8.8 points and 5 rebounds per game in 18.8 minutes of playing time. He also appeared in the 2008–09 Euroleague, during which he played 5 games averaging 8 points and 6.4 rebounds per game. In the summer of 2009 he joined the Houston Rockets for the Las Vegas Summer League, and averaged 2 points and 1.7 rebounds in 4.6 minutes per game.

=== Chinese Basketball Association ===
Gaines signed for the Xinjiang Flying Tigers in 2009 and played 10 games in the playoffs of the 2008–09 Chinese Basketball Association season, averaging 29.5 points and 10.4 rebounds in 37.3 minutes per game. He stayed with the team for the 2009–10 season and posted averages of 30.4 points and 10.7 rebounds in 39.4 minutes per game over 43 appearances. On February 26, 2010, Gaines recorded a career-high 47 points against the Qingdao Eagles. He ranked second in scoring with 30.4 points per game behind Andre Emmett for the 2009–10 season and was a first-team All-CBA selection.

In 2010 Gaines signed for the Qingdao Eagles for the 2010–11 CBA season. On December 15, 2010, Gaines scored 43 points (along with 16 rebounds) against the Beijing Ducks. At the end of the season he recorded averages of 33.2 points, 13.1 rebounds and 2.4 steals per game in 32 appearances: he was the league's top scorer, the 5th best rebounder and was again named in the All-CBA First Team.

In 2011 he moved to the Shanxi Brave Dragons to play the 2011–12 season. He earned his first and only All-Star selection in 2012, and played for the Northern All-Stars team. During the All-Star game he posted a game-high 10 rebounds along with 24 points. on February 28, 2012, Gaines had a 20–20 game, scoring 29 points and recording 23 rebounds against the Shanghai Sharks. He finished the season averaging 29.1 points (4th in the league) and 14.3 rebounds (3rd in the league), and was named Foreign Player of the Week 3 times (weeks 3, 8 and 11).

On January 2, 2013, in a game against the Zhejiang Golden Bulls, Gaines scored 60 points and posted 29 rebounds, both career-highs. In the same game Quincy Douby scored a CBA record 75 points. In the 2012–13 season he was named 3 times Foreign Player of the Week (weeks 1, 4 and 5), and made the All-CBA second team with averages of 31.5 points, 15.2 rebounds and 2.2 steals per game. In the 2013–14 season he was named Foreign Player of the Week on Week 2 and was the league rebounding leader with 14.1 rebounds per game. He repeated this feat in the following season, during which he averaged 16.4 rebounds per game playing for the Zhejiang Golden Bulls. In the 2015–16 season he was the 8th best rebounder in the league with an 11.7 per game average.

=== National Basketball League ===
In 2017 Gaines signed for the Shaanxi Wolves in the National Basketball League, the second level of Chinese basketball, and won the league title, scoring 31 points and grabbing 14 rebounds in the decisive 5th game of the championship series against Anhui. In the following season he signed for the Anhui Dragons, averaging 33.8 points per game (6th best in the league), 17.5 rebounds (3rd best) and 2.4 steals (4th best).

== Career statistics ==
=== Domestic leagues ===
| Season | Team | League | GP | GS | MPG | FG% | 3P% | FT% | RPG | APG | SPG | BPG | PPG |
|---|---|---|---|---|---|---|---|---|---|---|---|---|---|
| 2004–05 | Michigan Mayhem | CBA (USA) | 44 | 30 | 37.1 | .579 | .250 | .681 | 11.4 | 0.7 | 1.2 | 0.5 | 18.3 |
| 2004–05 | Viola Reggio Calabria | LBA | 9 | 4 | 28.3 | .521 | .500 | .682 | 8.8 | 0.2 | 1.4 | 1.3 | 14.4 |
| 2005–06 | ASVEL | Pro A | 33 | 30 | 28.6 | .551 | .000 | .596 | 8.1 | 1.1 | 0.9 | 0.7 | 13.6 |
| 2006–07 | Joventut Badalona | Liga ACB | 34 | 30 | 25.8 | .560 | .000 | .690 | 7.8 | 0.7 | 1.5 | 0.7 | 11.1 |
| 2007–08 | Galatasaray | TBL | 28 | | 25.7 | .544 | .000 | .667 | 8.1 | 0.9 | 0.9 | 0.3 | 12.9 |
| 2008–09 | Austin Toros | D-League | 23 | 21 | 36.4 | .529 | .000 | .696 | 10.4 | 0.7 | 1.0 | 0.7 | 15.1 |
| 2008–09 | Maccabi Tel Aviv | BSL | 9 | 4 | 18.8 | .696 | .000 | .625 | 5.0 | 0.3 | 1.0 | 1.4 | 8.8 |
| 2009–10 | Xinjiang Flying Tigers | CBA | 32 | | 39.4 | .639 | .200 | .728 | 10.8 | 1.4 | 2.1 | 1.0 | 30.6 |
| 2010–11 | Qingdao Eagles | CBA | 32 | | 37.4 | .614 | .000 | .664 | 13.5 | 1.9 | 2.5 | 0.8 | 33.7 |
| 2011–12 | Shanxi Brave Dragons | CBA | 32 | | 34.9 | .641 | .000 | .632 | 13.1 | 1.3 | 1.8 | 0.8 | 29.3 |
| 2012–13 | Shanxi Brave Dragons | CBA | 32 | 17 | 38.8 | .663 | .000 | .653 | 15.2 | 1.6 | 2.1 | 0.7 | 31.5 |
| 2013–14 | Shanxi Brave Dragons | CBA | 33 | 5 | 36.1 | .577 | .000 | .690 | 14.1 | 1.5 | 1.1 | 0.5 | 24.5 |
| 2014–15 | Zhejiang Golden Bulls | CBA | 22 | 22 | 39.3 | .614 | .000 | .652 | 16.5 | 2.3 | 1.0 | 0.6 | 27.2 |
| 2015–16 | Zhejiang Golden Bulls | CBA | 37 | | 28.6 | .586 | .000 | .713 | 11.6 | 1.0 | 0.6 | 0.4 | 19.1 |

=== Playoffs ===
| Season | Team | League | GP | GS | MPG | FG% | 3P% | FT% | RPG | APG | SPG | BPG | PPG |
|---|---|---|---|---|---|---|---|---|---|---|---|---|---|
| 2006 | ASVEL | Pro A | 2 | 2 | 27.5 | .400 | .000 | 1.000 | 9.5 | 0.5 | 2.0 | 0.5 | 9.0 |
| 2007 | Joventut Badalona | Liga ACB | 5 | 3 | 17.0 | .471 | .000 | .364 | 3.8 | 0.2 | 1.0 | 0.0 | 4.0 |
| 2008 | Galatasaray | TBL | 3 | | 24.3 | .692 | .000 | .688 | 7.7 | 0.7 | 0.7 | 1.0 | 15.7 |
| 2009 | Xinjiang Flying Tigers | CBA | 10 | | 37.3 | .648 | .000 | .692 | 10.4 | 1.3 | 2.0 | 1.5 | 29.5 |
| 2010 | Xinjiang Flying Tigers | CBA | 11 | | 40.2 | .608 | .000 | .696 | 10.3 | 1.8 | 2.6 | 0.4 | 29.9 |
| 2012 | Shanxi Brave Dragons | CBA | 9 | | 35.9 | .557 | .000 | .716 | 18.0 | 1.0 | 0.6 | 1.0 | 28.6 |
| 2016 | Zhejiang Golden Bulls | CBA | 3 | | 30.0 | .526 | .000 | .632 | 12.0 | 2.0 | 2.0 | 1.3 | 24.0 |

=== Euroleague ===
| Year | Team | GP | GS | MPG | FG% | 3P% | FT% | RPG | APG | SPG | BPG | PPG | PIR |
|---|---|---|---|---|---|---|---|---|---|---|---|---|---|
| 2006–07 | Joventut Badalona | 20 | 16 | 24.9 | .514 | .000 | .659 | 6.3 | 0.5 | 1.3 | 0.4 | 10.3 | 12.3 |
| 2008–09 | Maccabi Tel Aviv | 5 | 4 | 24.3 | .583 | .000 | .667 | 6.4 | 0.6 | 1.2 | 0.2 | 8.0 | 12.0 |
| Career | | 25 | 20 | 24.6 | .549 | .000 | .663 | 6.4 | 0.6 | 1.3 | 0.3 | 9.2 | 12.2 |

=== ULEB Cup ===
| Year | Team | GP | GS | MPG | FG% | 3P% | FT% | RPG | APG | SPG | BPG | PPG | PIR |
|---|---|---|---|---|---|---|---|---|---|---|---|---|---|
| 2005–06 | ASVEL | 14 | 13 | 26.7 | .536 | .000 | .649 | 8.1 | 0.6 | 1.3 | 0.7 | 12.0 | 15.1 |
| 2007–08 | Galatasaray | 17 | 13 | 27.5 | .587 | .000 | .492 | 7.3 | 0.8 | 1.1 | 0.4 | 12.4 | 14.9 |
| Career | | 31 | 26 | 27.1 | .562 | .000 | .571 | 7.7 | 0.7 | 1.2 | 0.6 | 12.2 | 15.0 |

=== College ===
| Year | Team | GP | GS | MPG | FG% | 3P% | FT% | RPG | APG | SPG | BPG | PPG |
|---|---|---|---|---|---|---|---|---|---|---|---|---|
| 1999–00 | Southwest Missouri State | 32 | 0 | 9.9 | .471 | .000 | .733 | 2.1 | 0.1 | 0.2 | 0.7 | 3.0 |
| 2000–01 | Southwest Missouri State | 29 | 21 | 25.3 | .468 | .000 | .732 | 6.2 | 0.6 | 0.4 | 1.1 | 8.3 |
| 2001–02 | Southern Miss | Did not play – transfer | | | | | | | | | | |
| 2002–03 | Southern Miss | 29 | 29 | 29.7 | .514 | .000 | .662 | 9.6 | 0.6 | 0.9 | 1.1 | 15.1 |
| 2003–04 | Southern Miss | 28 | 28 | 31.4 | .495 | .250 | .727 | 10.4 | 0.8 | 1.2 | 1.3 | 15.7 |
| Career | | 118 | 78 | 24.1 | .493 | .167 | .702 | 6.9 | 0.5 | 0.7 | 1.0 | 10.3 |
