= Soumaila Samake =

Malian basketball player (born 1978)

Personal information
- Born: March 18, 1978 (age 48) Bougouni, Mali
- Listed height: 7 ft 0 in (2.13 m)
- Listed weight: 245 lb (111 kg)

Career information
- NBA draft: 2000: 2nd round, 36th overall pick
- Drafted by: New Jersey Nets
- Playing career: 1996–2019
- Position: Center
- Number: 45, 0

Career history
- 1996–1997: KK Idrija
- 1997–1999: Geoplin Slovan
- 1999: Union Olimpija
- 1999–2000: Cincinnati Stuff
- 2000–2001: New Jersey Nets
- 2001–2002: Orlandina Basket
- 2002: Los Angeles Lakers
- 2002–2003: Greenville Groove
- 2004: Detal Inowroclaw
- 2004–2006: Zhejiang Wanma Cyclones
- 2006: Geoplin Slovan
- 2006–2007: Zhejiang Wanma Cyclones
- 2007: Ohod Al Madina
- 2007–2008: Zhejiang Wanma Cyclones
- 2008: BEEM Mazandaran
- 2008: Zain
- 2008–2010: Jilin Northeast Tigers
- 2010: Mornar Bar
- 2010–2011: Caspian Qazvin
- 2011–2012: Quebec Kebs
- 2018–2019: Vancouver Dragons

Career highlights
- CBA rebounding champion (2008)
- Stats at NBA.com
- Stats at Basketball Reference

Soumaila Samake (born March 18, 1978) is a Malian former professional basketball player. A 7'0" tall center, he was drafted by the New Jersey Nets in the second round of the 2000 NBA draft, and played for the Nets and the Los Angeles Lakers.

== Career ==
Samake scored 68 points and grabbed 76 rebounds in 47 NBA games between 2000 and 2003. His final NBA game was played on December 4, 2002, in a 85–93 loss to the Utah Jazz where he played for two minutes and recorded no stats.

While playing with the Lakers in 2002, Samake was suspended five games after testing positive for Nandrolone, an anabolic steroid. Samake said that he had accidentally ingested the substance while taking a dietary supplement. He was only the third NBA player suspended for steroids, following Don MacLean and Matt Geiger.

On November 29, 2011, it was announced that the National Basketball League of Canada's Quebec Kebs had signed Samake to their active roster.
