= Yu Shulong =

Chinese basketball player

Yu Shulong 于澍龙
Personal information
- Born: February 19, 1990 (age 36) Changchun, Jilin, China
- Listed height: 6 ft 1 in (1.85 m)
- Listed weight: 150 lb (68 kg)

Career information
- Playing career: 2008–2019
- Position: Guard

Career history

Playing
- 2008–2012: Jilin Northeast Tigers
- 2012–2014: Dongguan Leopards
- 2014–2017: Sichuan Blue Whales
- 2017–2019: Beijing Royal Fighters

Coaching
- 2022–2024: Guangdong Vermilion Birds (assistant)
- 2024–present: Shenzhen Leopards (assistant)
Medals
Men's basketball
Representing China
FIBA Asia Championship
Gold medal – first place	2011 Wuhan	Team

Yu Shulong (born February 19, 1990, in Jilin, China) is a Chinese former professional basketball player. He is also a former member of the Chinese national basketball team.

== Professional career ==
Yu debuted for the Jilin Northeast Tigers in the 2009–10 CBA season. He averaged 11.3 points, 2.5 rebounds, and 2.4 assists per game in 31 games for the Tigers. He was named to the Northern Rookie All-Star Team at the All-Star weekend Rookie Challenge, where he scored a team high 18 points.

On October 31, 2014, he was signed by the Sichuan Blue Whales. During his second season with Sichuan, he'd help the Blue Whales earn their first ever CBA Finals championship.

== Chinese national team ==
Yu is also a member of the Chinese national basketball team. After competing for the junior national team at various levels of competition, he was named to the senior team for the first time at the 2010 FIBA World Championship in Turkey.
