= 2009–10 Chinese Basketball Association season =

2009–10 CBA season
- League: Chinese Basketball Association
- Sport: Basketball
- Duration: December 19, 2009 – April 25, 2010
- TV partner(s): CCTV-5, and many local channels.

Regular Season
- Season champions: Guangdong Southern Tigers
- Season MVP: (China) Mengke Bateer

Playoffs

Finals
- Champions: Guangdong Southern Tigers
- Runners-up: Xinjiang Flying Tigers
- Finals MVP: (China) Zhu Fangyu

CBA seasons
- ← 2008–09 2010–11 →

The 2009–10 CBA season was the 15th CBA season. Guangdong Southern Tigers won their third consecutive CBA title for the second time, defeating Xinjiang Flying Tigers in the Finals, four games to one.

Yunnan Bulls were suspended for the season due to salary reasons, and would conditionally retain their eligibility for the 2010–11 season.

Foreign players of each team could play no more than 6 quarters (5 quarters when facing Bayi Rockets) collectively each game. Asian players were not regarded as foreign players.

In the Playoffs, the distance of 3 point line expanded from 6.25m to 6.75m.

== Coaching changes ==
Club	Outgoing	Manner	When	Incoming
Liaoning Dinosaurs	(Lithuania) Rytis Vaišvila	Sacked	After Round 17	(China) Guo Shiqiang
Beijing Ducks	(United States) Sidney Moncrief	Sacked	After Round 20	(China) Min Lulei
Fujian Xunxing	(United States) Aaron McCarthy	Sacked	After Round 23	(China) Zhang Degui
Jiangsu Dragons	(United States) Jason Rabedeaux	Sacked	After Round 32	(China) Xu Qiang

== Regular season standings ==
#	2009–10 CBA season							
#	Team	W	L	PCT	GB	Home	Road	Tiebreaker
1	Guangdong Southern Tigers	30	2	.938	-	15–1	15–1	
2	Xinjiang Flying Tigers	27	5	.844	3	15–1	12–4	
3	Zhejiang Lions	26	6	.813	4	15–1	11–5	
4	Shanghai Sharks	25	7	.781	5	14–2	11–5	
5	Liaoning Dinosaurs	21	11	.656	9	14–2	7–9	
6	Jiangsu Dragons	20	12	.625	10	13–3	7–9	
7	Fujian Xunxing	17	15	.531	13	13–3	4–12	
8	Bayi Rockets	15	17	.469	15	10–6	5–11	
9	Shandong Lions	14	18	.438	16	10–6	4–12	SD 1-1(198-176) ZJ
10	Zhejiang Whirlwinds	14	18	.438	16	9–7	5–11	SD 1-1(198-176) ZJ
11	Dongguan Leopards	13	19	.406	17	9–7	4–12	
12	Tianjin Ronggang	11	21	.344	19	9–7	2–14	
13	Jilin Northeast Tigers	10	22	.313	20	7–9	3–13	JL 2-0 SX
14	Shanxi Zhongyu	10	22	.313	20	6–10	4–12	JL 2-0 SX
15	Beijing Ducks	8	24	.250	22	6–10	2–14	
16	Qingdao DoubleStar	7	25	.219	23	7–9	0–16	
17	Shaanxi Kylins	4	28	.125	26	3–13	1–15	

Key to colors
Top 8 teams advance to the Playoffs

== All-star weekend ==
=== Rookie Challenge ===
Southern Rookies
Pos.	Player	Team
F	(China) Cao Fei	Zhejiang Whirlwinds
C	(China) Xu Zhonghao	Bayi Rockets
G/F	(China) Zhang Chengyu	Bayi Rockets
G	(China) Feng Qi	Dongguan Leopards
G/F	(China) He Zhongmian	Dongguan Leopards
C	(China) Sun Zhe	Dongguan Leopards
F	(China) Dong Hanlin	Guangdong Southern Tigers
F	(China) Li Gen	Shanghai Sharks
F	(China) Liu Yahui	Jiangsu Dragons
F	(China) Wu Nan	Jiangsu Dragons
Head coach: (United States) Bob Donewald, Jr. (Shanghai Sharks)

Northern Rookies
Pos.	Player	Team
G	(China) Sui Ran	Shandong Lions
C	(China) Tao Hanlin	Shandong Lions
G	(China) Yu Shulong	Jilin Northeast Tigers
F	(China) Zhong Cheng	Jilin Northeast Tigers
F	(China) Zhang Biao	Jilin Northeast Tigers
G	(China) Xiralijan Muhtar	Xinjiang Flying Tigers
G	(China) Yang Wenbo	Shaanxi Kylins
F	(China) Sun Shengyue	Qingdao DoubleStar
F	(China) Zhang Zhihan	Tianjin Ronggang
F/C	(China) Zhang Ji	Tianjin Ronggang
Head coach: (China) Gong Xiaobin (Shandong Lions)

CCTV-5

March 20
19:00

Report

Southern Rookies 91, Northern Rookies 80
Scoring by quarter: 19-30, 24-23, 20-13, 28-14
Pts: Dong Hanlin 19; Rebs: Xu Zhonghao 7 Asts: Feng Qi, Zhang Chengyu 3	Pts: Yu Shulong 18; Rebs: Zhong Cheng 7 Asts: Yu Shulong 8

Wukesong Stadium, Beijing
Referees: Qiao Longsheng, Wang Xiaochun, Duan Zhu

=== All-star game ===
Southern All-Stars
Pos.	Player	Team	Total votes
Starters
G	(United States) John Lucas III	Shanghai Sharks	46168
G	(China) Hu Xuefeng^{INJ}	Jiangsu Dragons	32987
F	(China) Zhu Fangyu	Guangdong Southern Tigers	73765
F	(China) Zhang Kai	Dongguan Leopards	33338
C	(China) Wang Zhizhi	Bayi Rockets	82805
Reserves
F	(China) Ding Jinhui	Zhejiang Whirlwinds	-
F	(United States) Rodney White	Zhejiang Lions	-
F	(Chinese Taipei) Lin Chih-Chieh	Zhejiang Lions	-
G	(China) Yi Li	Jiangsu Dragons	-
G	(China) Gong Songlin	Fujian Xunxing	-
G	(China) Liu Wei	Shanghai Sharks	-
G	(China) Wang Shipeng	Guangdong Southern Tigers	-
Head coach: (China) Li Chunjiang (Guangdong Southern Tigers)

^INJ Hu Xuefeng was replaced by Liu Wei in the starting lineup due to finger injury.

Northern All-Stars
Pos.	Player	Team	Total votes
Starters
G	(China) Zhang Qingpeng	Liaoning Dinosaurs	89924
G	(China) Yang Ming	Liaoning Dinosaurs	36180
F	(China) Li Xiaoxu	Liaoning Dinosaurs	64389
F	(China) Zhang Nan	Tianjin Ronggang	35332
C	(China) Mengke Bateer	Xinjiang Flying Tigers	62194
Reserves
G	(United States) Stephon Marbury^{MVP}	Shanxi Zhongyu	-
G	(China) Chen Lei	Beijing Ducks	-
F	(China) Duan Jiangpeng	Shanxi Zhongyu	-
F	(China) Xu Guochong	Xinjiang Flying Tigers	-
F	(United States) Stromile Swift^{INJ}	Shandong Lions	-
F	(China) Ji Zhe	Beijing Ducks	-
C	(China) Zheng Zhun	Shaanxi Kylins	-
C	(Nigeria) Olumide Oyedeji	Liaoning Dinosaurs	-
Head coach: (China) Jiang Xingquan (Xinjiang Flying Tigers)

^INJ Unable to participate due to injury. Olumide Oyedeji was named as the replacement for Stromile Swift.
^MVP Stephon Marbury was awarded the MVP of the game.

CCTV-5

March 21
19:00

Report

Southern All-stars 121, Northern All-stars 133
Scoring by quarter: 31-28, 27-29, 28-33, 35-43
Pts: Rodney White 32; Rebs: Rodney White 9 Asts: John Lucas III 7	Pts: Stephon Marbury 30; Rebs: Olumide Oyedeji 16; Asts: Stephon Marbury 10

Wukesong Stadium, Beijing
Referees: Ma Lijun, Yu Bin, Wang Mei

=== Slam Dunk Contest ===
Contestants
Pos.	Player	Team	Preliminary			Final		
Pos.	Player	Team	1st dunk	2nd dunk	Total	1st dunk	2nd dunk	Total
C	(United States) Sean Williams	Fujian Xunxing	47	50	97	42	45	87
F	(China) Zhang Zhihan	Tianjin Ronggang	40	45	85	35	42	77
F	(China) Wu Nan	Jiangsu Dragons	49	50	99	35	30	65
F	(China) Cai Lilong	Jiangsu Dragons	40	43	83	—		
F	(China) Zhang Ji	Tianjin Ronggang	44	34	78	—		
G	(China) Wang Fei	Zhejiang Lions	30	42	72	—		
F	(United States) Stromile Swift^{INJ}	Shandong Lions	—					

^INJ Unable to participate due to injury. Zhang Zhihan and Zhang Ji were named as replacements for Stromile Swift.

=== Three-Point Shootout ===
Contestants
Pos.	Player	Team	Preliminary	Final
G	(China) Zhang Qingpeng	Liaoning Dinosaurs	19	22
G	(China) Jin Lipeng	Zhejiang Lions	15	15
G	(United States) John Lucas III	Shanghai Sharks	15	11
F	(China) Wang Ligang	Shanghai Sharks	12	—
F	(China) Wei Mingliang	Shanxi Zhongyu	11	—
F	(China) Xu Guochong	Xinjiang Flying Tigers	10	—

=== Skills Challenge ===
Contestants
Pos.	Player	Team	Preliminary	Final
G	(Chinese Taipei) Lin Chih-Chieh	Zhejiang Lions	46.97	38.07
G	(China) Liu Wei	Shanghai Sharks	45.35	45.67
G	(China) Xie Libin	Beijing Ducks	53.80	—
G	(China) Yang Ming	Liaoning Dinosaurs	57.47	—
G	(United States) Stephon Marbury^{PER}	Shanxi Zhongyu	—	

^PER Unable to participate for personal reasons. Yang Ming was named as the replacement for Stephon Marbury.

== Playoffs ==
Teams in bold advanced to the next round. The numbers to the left of each team indicate the team's seeding in regular season, and the numbers to the right indicate the number of games the team won in that round. Home court advantage belongs to the team with the better regular season record; teams enjoying the home advantage are shown in italics.

Quarterfinals
**1**	**Guangdong Southern Tigers**	**3**
8	Bayi Rockets	0
**4**	**Shanghai Sharks**	**3**
5	Liaoning Dinosaurs	1
**3**	**Zhejiang Lions**	**3**
6	Jiangsu Dragons	0
**2**	**Xinjiang Flying Tigers**	**3**
7	Fujian Xunxing	0

Semifinals
**1**	**Guangdong Southern Tigers**	**3**
4	Shanghai Sharks	1
3	Zhejiang Lions	0
**2**	**Xinjiang Flying Tigers**	**3**

Finals
**1**	**Guangdong Southern Tigers**	**4**
2	Xinjiang Flying Tigers	1

== Statistics leaders ==
Category	Player	Team	Stat
Points per game	(United States) Andre Emmett	Shandong Lions	32.0
Rebounds per game	(Puerto Rico) Peter John Ramos	Zhejiang Lions	13.0
Assists per game	(China) Lü Xiaoming	Fujian Xunxing	7.2
Steals per game	(United States) Chris Williams	Qingdao DoubleStar	3.8
Blocks per game	(Ivory Coast) Herve Lamizana	Tianjin Ronggang	3.8
3-pointers per game	(United States) John Lucas III	Shanghai Sharks	4.3
Dunks per game	(United States) Stromile Swift	Shandong Lions	2.7
