= Youngor Arena =

Sports venue in Ningbo, China

Youngor Arena 雅戈尔体育馆
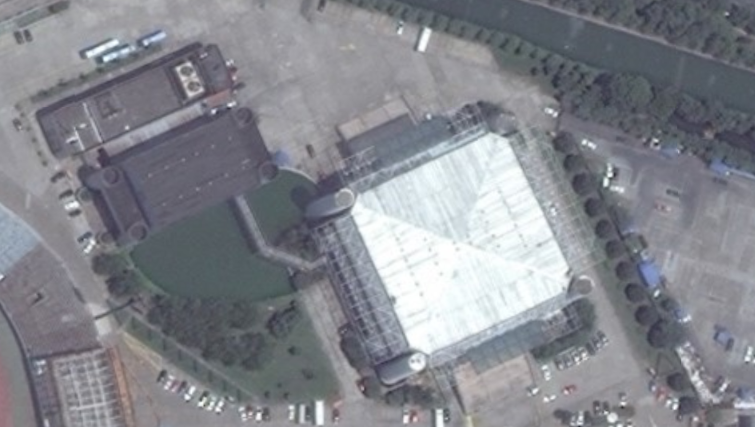
- Interactive map of Youngor Arena 雅戈尔体育馆
- Full name: Youngor Arena
- Location: Ningbo, China
- Coordinates: 29°52′20″N 121°58′35″E
- Capacity: 5,000
- Surface: Hardwood

Construction
- Opened: 1994

Tenant
- Ningbo Rockets (CBA)

Youngor Arena is an indoor sporting arena located in Ningbo, China. Opened in 1994, the capacity of the arena is 5,000 spectators. It hosts indoor sporting events such as basketball and volleyball. It hosts the Ningbo Rockets of the Chinese Basketball Association (CBA).
