= Ningbo Rockets =

Ningbo Rockets 宁波富邦火箭
- League: CBA
- Founded: 2021; 5 years ago
- History: Ningbo Rockets (2021–present)
- Arena: Youngor Arena
- Capacity: 5,000
- Location: Ningbo, Zhejiang, China
- Team colors: White, Blue
- Main sponsor: Ningbo Twinwash (2023–present)
- Head coach: Xu Zhonghao
- Ownership: Ningbo Fubang Holdings (2021–present)
- Championships: 0
Home	Away	Third

Ningbo Rockets
- Chinese: 宁波富邦火箭
Transcriptions
Standard Mandarin
- Hanyu Pinyin: Níngbō Fùbāng Huǒjiàn

The Ningbo Rockets (Chinese: 宁波火箭; pinyin: Níngbō Huǒjiàn), or Ningbo Fubang Rockets (Chinese: 宁波富邦火箭; pinyin: Níngbō Fùbāng Huǒjiàn), competing as Ningbo Yongxing Securities (Chinese: 宁波汀渥; pinyin: Níngbō Tīngwò), are a professional basketball team based in Ningbo, Zhejiang. They are currently competing in the Chinese Basketball Association. The team are derived from the dissolved Bayi Rockets.

== History ==
Early in 2006, the Bayi Fubang basketball team were established as a joint venture between Ningbo Fubang Holdings and the Bayi Rockets. In 2018, the two owners parted ways due to military reform for Bayi Rockets' military backgrounds. The Bayi Rockets were able to participate in the CBA league as a special guest team, while Ningbo Fubang Holdings retained a spot for its own team in the league. After the Bayi Rockets dissolved and quit the league in 2020, Ningbo Fubang applied for acquisition of the team, but was not approved.

In 2021, the Ningbo Rockets was founded by Ningbo Fubang Holdings as a new club, but the company claimed its connections with the Bayi Rockets. Li Ke, former player of the Bayi Rockets, was appointed as the head coach.

In their debut season, the 2021-22 CBA season, the team only succeeded in scoring 3 wins in 38 games in the regular season and were unable to make the playoffs, followed by 4 wins in 42 games in the 2022-23 CBA season.

== Players ==
=== Current roster ===
Note: Flags indicate national team eligibility at FIBA-sanctioned events. Players may hold other non-FIBA nationalities not displayed.

Ningbo Rockets roster
Players
Coaches

Pos.	No.	Nat.	Name	Ht.	Wt.	Age
PG	1	(China)	Wang Fanyi	1.95 m (6 ft 5 in)	98 kg (216 lb)	26 – 6 November 2000
SG	5	(United States)	Frank Jackson	1.91 m (6 ft 3 in)	93 kg (205 lb)	28 – 4 May 1998
F/C	7	(China)	Yu Changdong	2.06 m (6 ft 9 in)	110 kg (243 lb)	35 – 26 October 1991
G	8	(China)	Shao Weiyun	1.88 m (6 ft 2 in)	80 kg (176 lb)	25 – 21 January 2001
G/F	9	(China)	Xu Yuzhun	1.98 m (6 ft 6 in)	95 kg (209 lb)	27 – 17 August 1999
F	10	(China)	Ning Hongyu	2.08 m (6 ft 10 in)	92 kg (203 lb)	30 – 23 November 1995
G	12	(The Bahamas)	Franco Miller Jr.	1.91 m (6 ft 3 in)	91 kg (201 lb)	27 – 9 February 1999
G/F	15	(China)	Zhao Jianshu	1.95 m (6 ft 5 in)	90 kg (198 lb)	28 – 22 February 1998
F	16	(China)	Luo Kaiwen	2.00 m (6 ft 7 in)	96 kg (212 lb)	31 – 18 July 1995
G/F	23	(China)	Luan Licheng	1.93 m (6 ft 4 in)	85 kg (187 lb)	28 – 3 March 1998
G	24	(China)	Dai Hao	1.95 m (6 ft 5 in)	78 kg (172 lb)	24 – 16 January 2002
PG	25	(China)	Zhao Yanhao	1.95 m (6 ft 5 in)	79 kg (174 lb)	29 – 25 October 1997
F/C	27	(China)	Li Yuanxin	2.08 m (6 ft 10 in)	120 kg (265 lb)	25 – 30 April 2001
PG	29	(China)	Ding Chao	1.83 m (6 ft 0 in)	80 kg (176 lb)	24 – 7 June 2002
G/F	31	(China)	Lei Ke	1.96 m (6 ft 5 in)	85 kg (187 lb)	24 – 31 October 2002
PF	32	(China)	Hu Junjie	2.05 m (6 ft 9 in)	95 kg (209 lb)	25 – 31 October 2001
F/C	88	(China)	Zheng Bowen	2.05 m (6 ft 9 in)	102 kg (225 lb)	24 – 21 March 2002
F/C	97	(China)	Lutubula	2.07 m (6 ft 9 in)	109 kg (240 lb)	27 – 24 October 1999
G	–	(United States)	Derrick Walton	1.85 m (6 ft 1 in)	84 kg (185 lb)	31 – 3 April 1995

Head coach

- (China) Xu Zhonghao

Assistant coach(es)

- (China) Li Ke
- (Serbia) Bojan Saratić

Legend

- (C) Team captain
- Injured

- Roster
Updated: 20 November 2026
