= Tiexi Gymnasium =

Indoor arena in Shenyang, China

- Interactive map of Tiexi Gymnasium
- Full name: Tiexi Gymnasium
- Location: Tiexi District, Shenyang, Liaoning, China
- Coordinates: 41.81354°N 123.32733°E
- Capacity: c. 4,000

Construction
- Opened: 2008

Tenant
- Liaoning Flying Leopards (CBA) (2009–2011)

Tiexi Gymnasium (Chinese: 铁西体育馆) is an indoor arena in the Tiexi District of Shenyang, Liaoning, China. Part of the Tiexi Sports Center, which it forms together with the adjacent Tiexi Stadium, it opened in 2008 and holds about 4,000 spectators.

== History ==
The gymnasium was built alongside the neighbouring Tiexi Stadium as the two halves of the Tiexi Sports Center, a "one stadium, one gymnasium" complex developed in the western part of Tiexi District. After Shenyang was chosen as one of the football co-host cities for the 2008 Summer Olympics, the complex was designated an Olympic reserve venue and built to the corresponding standard, and it was completed in 2008. Over the following decade the complex provided a venue for national, provincial and municipal sporting events.

The gymnasium served as the home arena of the Liaoning men's basketball team, the Liaoning Flying Leopards, for two Chinese Basketball Association seasons between 2009 and 2011. It also hosted the men's basketball final of the 2013 National Games of China in September 2013.

== Events ==
The arena is used for indoor sports and community events. Since the summer of 2024 it has staged the Tiexi "Factory BA" (Chinese: 厂BA), an amateur basketball competition contested by teams representing local industrial enterprises. The tournament was expanded into a citywide Shenyang competition in 2026; that edition opened on 27 March 2026 before a full house of around 4,000 and ran for some two months, with the final held at the gymnasium on 17 May 2026 between fields drawn from 48 company teams and more than 600 worker-athletes.

== See also ==
- Liaoning Gymnasium
- List of indoor arenas in China
