= Sun Zhe =

Chinese basketball player

No. 43 – Fujian Sturgeons
- Position: Center
- League: CBA

Personal information
- Born: August 14, 1990 (age 36) Guangdong, China
- Listed height: 7 ft 3 in (2.21 m)
- Listed weight: 278 lb (126 kg)

Career information
- NBA draft: 2012: undrafted
- Playing career: 2008–present

Career history
- 2008–2013: Guangdong Southern Tigers
- 2013–present: Fujian Sturgeons

Sun Zhe (born 14 August, 1990) is a 36-year-old basketball player from China, who currently plays for the Fujian Sturgeons, a Chinese Basketball Association (CBA) team. He stands 2.20m or 7'3" tall and weighs about 270 pounds, and has thus earned the nickname "Little Yao Ming", from CCTV, China's news channel. The trademarked nickname "Little Giant" no longer belongs to Chinese basketball legend, and NBA veteran Yao Ming, according to the Xinhua News Agency. Sun played his first Chinese top professional league game on January 2, 2008 when the Guangdong club player had two points, five rebounds and five fouls in his 17 minutes on court. According to the Taiwan News, he was not able to help his team win in the East Asian Games, though people already have big expectations for him. He is one of five players who is more than 7 feet tall on the Chinese National basketball team, which also includes Zhang Zhaoxu, Wang Zhizhi, Wang Zhelin, and Yi Jianlian.
