= Jin Lipeng =

Chinese basketball player

Jin Lipeng 金立鹏
Personal information
- Born: July 22, 1978 (age 48) Anshan, Liaoning, China
- Listed height: 6 ft 2 3/4 in (1.90 m)
- Listed weight: 175 lb (79 kg)

Career information
- Playing career: 1995–2013
- Position: Shooting guard

Career history
- 1995–1997: Liaoning Flying Leopards
- 2002–2004: Shandong Hi-Speed Kirin
- 2005–2008: Xinjiang Flying Tigers
- 2008–2010: Zhejiang Lions
- 2010–2011: Zhejiang Golden Bulls
- 2011–2013: Zhejiang Lions
Medals
Men's basketball
Representing China
FIBA Asia Under-18 Championship
| Gold medal – first place | 1996 Johor Bahru |
ABC Under-22 Championship
| Silver medal – second place | 1996 Shanghai |

Jin Lipeng (born July 22, 1978 in Liaoning, China) is a Chinese former professional basketball player. He played for the Zhejiang Lions of the Chinese Basketball Association. He is also a member of the Chinese national basketball team.

== Professional career ==
Jin played for the Zhejiang Lions in the 2009–10 CBA season. He averaged 13.3 points per game in 38 games for the Lions. He is a noted three-point specialist, shooting 42.4% from long distance in the 2009-10 season while taking 60 more three-pointers than two-pointers.

== Chinese national team ==
Jin is also a member of the Chinese national basketball team. He participated at various levels of junior competition in the 1990s for the Chinese team. He was named to his first major international competition at the 2010 FIBA World Championship in Turkey. At 32 years old, he was the second oldest member of the Chinese squad.
