= Luwan Gymnasium =

Basketball venue in Shanghai, China

Coordinates: 31°12′22″N 121°27′32″E

The Luwan Gymnasium is a basketball arena, in Luwan District, Shanghai, China. The arena is home to the Shanghai Sharks, a member of the Chinese Basketball Association. The facility seats 3,000 people.
