= Rodney White =

American basketball player (born 1980)

Personal information
- Born: June 28, 1980 (age 46) Philadelphia, Pennsylvania, U.S.
- Listed height: 6 ft 9 in (2.06 m)
- Listed weight: 240 lb (109 kg)

Career information
- High school: Newport School (Silver Spring, Maryland)
- College: Charlotte (2000–2001)
- NBA draft: 2001: 1st round, 9th overall pick
- Drafted by: Detroit Pistons
- Playing career: 2001–2013
- Position: Small forward / power forward
- Number: 5, 7, 3

Career history
- 2001–2002: Detroit Pistons
- 2002–2005: Denver Nuggets
- 2005: Golden State Warriors
- 2005–2006: Bàsquet Manresa
- 2006: Lagun Aro Bilbao
- 2006–2007: Scavolini-Gruppo Spar Pesaro
- 2007–2008: Zhejiang Guangsha Lions
- 2008: Arecibo Captains
- 2008: Maccabi Tel Aviv
- 2008–2010: Zhejiang Guangsha Lions
- 2010–2011: Shandong Golden Stars
- 2011: Anyang KGC Pro Basketball Club
- 2012: Zhejiang Guangsha Lions
- 2012: Barako Bull Energy
- 2013: Petron Blaze Boosters

Career highlights
- CBA scoring champion (2009); First-team All-Conference USA (2001)
- Stats at NBA.com
- Stats at Basketball Reference

Rodney Charles White (born June 28, 1980) is an American former professional basketball player. Born in Philadelphia, Pennsylvania, White played college basketball for the Charlotte 49ers, earning national freshman of the year honors from ESPN. He was selected by the Detroit Pistons with the ninth overall pick of the 2001 NBA draft.

== Professional career ==
=== Detroit Pistons (2001–2002) ===
Despite his lofty 9th overall selection, White quickly fell out of favor with new Pistons coach Rick Carlisle and played in only 16 games during the 2001–2002 season, averaging 3.5 points in 8.1 minutes.

=== Denver Nuggets (2002–2005) ===
Sensing untapped potential in White, then Denver Nuggets General Manager Kiki Vandeweghe took a gamble in the 2002 offseason, sending a bounty of two players and a future first-round pick to Detroit in exchange for White.

White had an inconsistent and tumultuous tenure in Denver. Flashes of brilliance on the offensive end were overshadowed by lack of defensive commitment, drawing the same ire from coach Jeff Bzdelik he had received from Carlisle in Detroit.

Overall, White averaged 7.7 points over 186 games with the Nuggets. His best output coming as an occasional starter during the hapless 17-win 2002–2003 season, in which he averaged 9 points in 72 games.

=== Golden State Warriors (2005) ===
That poor season parlayed into a top pick in the draft, which the Nuggets used to select Carmelo Anthony. With a surefire star in Anthony now on board, Vandeweghe was able to concede failure and package White with fellow bust Nikoloz Tskitishvili. Late in the 2004–2005 season, the pair was dealt to the Golden State Warriors in exchange for Eduardo Nájera, Luis Flores, and a future first-round pick. The pick was later sent to the Philadelphia 76ers as part of the Allen Iverson trade.

White played sparingly in 16 games for the Warriors, averaging 5.1 points in 11.7 minutes. White's final NBA game was played on April 20, 2005, in a 106 – 89 win over the Utah Jazz where White recorded 2 points and 1 rebound.

White was released by the Warriors the following summer.

=== Overseas (2005–2013) ===
White's career picked up in Europe, but his journeyman tag remained. White first caught on in the Spanish League with Bàsquet Manresa, followed by a stint with Lagun Aro Bilbao. He was cut by Bilbao on November 1, 2006. The following month, he joined Scavolini-Gruppo Spar Pesaro in the Italian League for the remainder of their season. In November 2007, he joined the Chinese League team Zhejiang Guangsha Lions. He next played with the Arecibo Captains of the Puerto Rican League. In the summer of 2008, he signed a contract with the Euroleague power Maccabi Tel Aviv. He was cut by Maccabi on December 2, 2008. White later played again for Zhejiang Guangsha lions in China. On June 15, 2011, he agreed to sign with the Anyang KGC basketball team in South Korea.

In 2012, he was signed as an import for the Barako Bull Energy in the Philippine Basketball Association replacing former teammate DerMarr Johnson. He requested for his release due to family reasons after playing six games for the Energy.

In 2013, he was signed by the Petron Blaze Boosters, also in the Philippine Basketball Association, replacing Renaldo Balkman, who had been banned from the league after an altercation with a teammate. White himself was subsequently replaced by Henry Sims. In his two games with Petron, he only totaled 14 points and 14 rebounds.
