= 2012–13 Chinese Basketball Association season =

CBA
- Duration: November 24, 2012 – March 29, 2013
- Games played: 32 (Regular season)
- Teams: 17
- TV partner: CCTV-5

Regular season
- Top seed: Guangdong Southern Tigers

Finals
- Champions: Guangdong Southern Tigers (8th title)
- Runners-up: Shandong Lions
- Semifinalists: Beijing Ducks; Xinjiang Flying Tigers
- Finals MVP: (China) Yi Jianlian

Awards
- Domestic MVP: (China) Yi Jianlian
- International MVP: (United States) Stephon Marbury

Statistical leaders
Points	(United States) Shavlik Randolph	32.5
Rebounds	(United States) Donnell Harvey	16.6
Assists	(Jordan) Osama Daghles	9.1

The 2012–13 CBA season was the 18th CBA season. This season began on November 24, 2012.

== Foreign players policy ==
All teams except Bayi Rockets can have two foreign players, while the bottom 5 teams of last season have an extra right to sign an Asian player. The rule of using players in each game is described in this chart:

#	Facing other teams	Facing Bayi Rockets
Chinese players+	No Limit	No Limit
Asian players++	No Limit	5 quarters collectively+++
International players	6 quarters collectively	5 quarters collectively+++

+ Including players from Hong Kong and Chinese Taipei.

++ If teams waive their rights to sign the extra Asian player, they may use foreign players for 7 quarters collectively.

+++ Only 1 allowed in the 4th quarter.

== Regular season standings ==
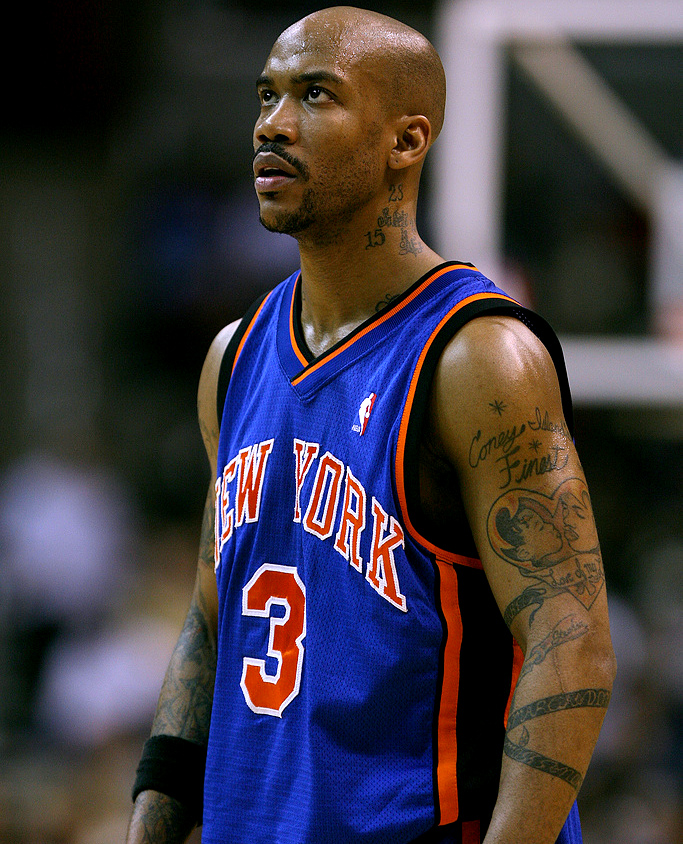
Former New York Knicks player Stephon Marbury was voted CBA Foreign MVP.

#	2012–13 CBA season							
#	Team	W	L	PCT	GB	Home	Road	Tiebreaker
1	Guangdong Southern Tigers	28	4	.875	-	14–2	14–2	
2	Shandong Lions	24	8	.750	4	14–2	10–6	
3	Beijing Ducks	21	11	.656	7	13–3	8–8	BJ 2-0 XJ
4	Xinjiang Flying Tigers	21	11	.656	7	14–2	7–9	BJ 2-0 XJ
5	Liaoning Flying Leopards	19	13	.594	9	11–5	8–8	
6	Zhejiang Lions	17	15	.531	11	14–2	3–13	ZJ 1-1(209-206) DG
7	Dongguan Leopards	17	15	.531	11	10–6	7–9	ZJ 1-1(209-206) DG
8	Zhejiang Golden Bulls	16	16	.500	12	12–4	4–12	ZJ 2-2(475-451); BY 2-2(398-407); SX 2-2(451-466)
9	Bayi Rockets	16	16	.500	12	10–6	6–10	ZJ 2-2(475-451); BY 2-2(398-407); SX 2-2(451-466)
10	Shanxi Brave Dragons	16	16	.500	12	12–4	4–12	ZJ 2-2(475-451); BY 2-2(398-407); SX 2-2(451-466)
11	Foshan Dralions	15	17	.469	13	9–7	6–10	
12	Jiangsu Dragons	13	19	.406	15	11–5	2–14	
13	Fujian Sturgeons	11	21	.344	17	7–9	4–12	
14	Shanghai Sharks	10	22	.313	18	7–9	3–13	SH 2-2(373-367); JL 2-2(398-395); TJ 2-2(357-366)
15	Jilin Northeast Tigers	10	22	.313	18	7–9	3–13	SH 2-2(373-367); JL 2-2(398-395); TJ 2-2(357-366)
16	Tianjin Golden Lions	10	22	.313	18	7–9	3–13	SH 2-2(373-367); JL 2-2(398-395); TJ 2-2(357-366)
17	Qingdao Eagles	8	24	.250	20	6–10	2–14	

Key to colors
Top 8 teams advance to the Playoffs

== Statistics leaders ==
=== Individual statistic leaders ===
Category	Player	Team	Statistics
Points per game	(United States) Shavlik Randolph	Foshan Dralions	32.00
Rebounds per game	(United States) Donnell Harvey	Tianjin Golden Lions	16.61
Assists per game	(Jordan) Osama Daghles	Tianjin Golden Lions	9.11
Steals per game	(United States) Dewarick Spencer	Jilin Northeast Tigers	2.59
Blocks per game	(Senegal) Hamady N'Diaye	Tianjin Golden Lions	3.90
Minutes per game	(China) Lebo Yao	Liaoning Flying Leopards	42.2

== Playoffs bracket ==
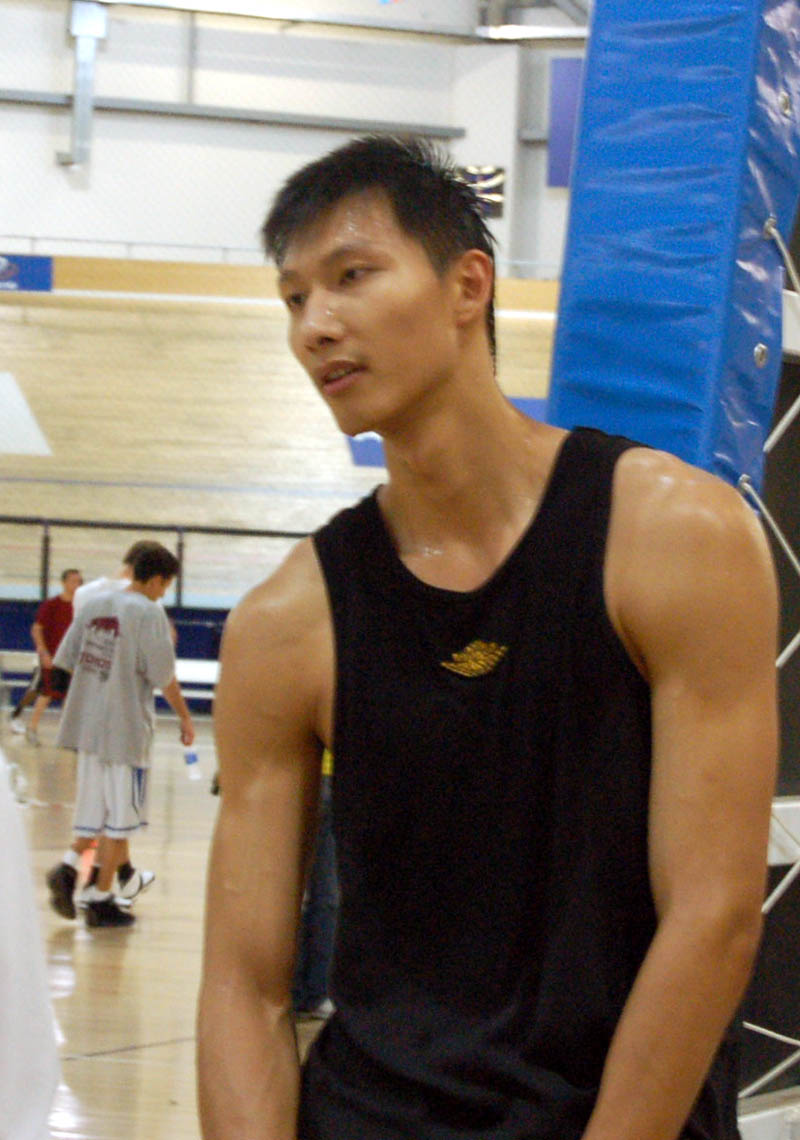
Yi Jianlian led his team to the playoffs, and to its 8th title, and was also voted CBA Domestic MVP.

Quarterfinals; Best of 5
1	Guangdong Southern Tigers	3
8	Zhejiang Golden Bulls	0
4	Xinjiang Flying Tigers	3
5	Liaoning Flying Leopards	2
3	Beijing Ducks	3
6	Zhejiang Lions	0
2	Shandong Lions	3
7	Dongguan Leopards	0

Semifinals; Best of 5
1	Guangdong Southern Tigers	3
4	Xinjiang Flying Tigers	0
3	Beijing Ducks	0
2	Shandong Lions	3

Finals; Best of 7
1	Guangdong Southern Tigers	4
2	Shandong Lions	0

== Awards ==
=== Players of the week ===
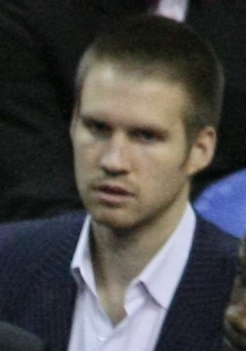
Shavlik Randolph was the scoring champion of the regular season

The following players were named the Domestic and Foreign Players of the Week.

Week	Domestic Player	Foreign Player	Ref.
1	Yi Jianlian (Guangdong Southern Tigers)	(United States) Charles Gaines (Shanxi Brave Dragons)	
2	Yi Jianlian (Guangdong Southern Tigers) (2)	(United States) Mike Harris (Jiangsu Dragons)	
3	Xiralijan Muhtar (Xinjiang Flying Tigers)	(United States) Marcus Williams (Shanxi Brave Dragons)	
4	Wang Zhizhi (Bayi Rockets)	(United States) Charles Gaines (Shanxi Brave Dragons) (2)	
5	Yi Jianlian (Guangdong Southern Tigers) (3)	(United States) Charles Gaines (Shanxi Brave Dragons) (3)	
6	Yi Jianlian (Guangdong Southern Tigers) (4)	(United States) Quincy Douby (Zhejiang Golden Bulls)	
7	Yi Jianlian (Guangdong Southern Tigers) (5)	(United States) Stephon Marbury (Beijing Ducks)	
8	Yi Jianlian (Guangdong Southern Tigers) (6)	(United States) Marcus Haislip (Dongguan Leopards)	
9	Not announced	Not announced	
10	Wang Zhelin (Fujian Xunxing)	(United States) Shavlik Randolph (Foshan Dralions)	
11	Li Xiaoxu (Liaoning Flying Leopards)	(United States) Von Wafer (Xinjiang Flying Tigers)	
