= Hongshan Arena =

Sports venue in Ürümqi, China

- Red Mountain Sports Arena
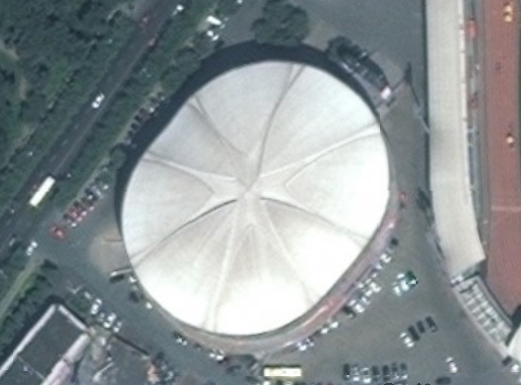
- Interactive map of Hongshan Arena
- Full name: Hongshan Arena
- Location: Ürümqi, Xinjiang, China
- Coordinates: 43.80865°N 87.60854°E
- Capacity: 3,800

Construction
- Opened: 2002

Tenant
- Xinjiang Flying Tigers (CBA)

Hongshan Arena is an indoor sporting arena located in Ürümqi, Xinjiang, China. The capacity of the arena is 3,800 spectators and opened in 2002. It hosts indoor sporting events such as basketball and volleyball. It hosts the Xinjiang Flying Tigers of the Chinese Basketball Association.

== See also ==
- Sport in China
