= Peter John Ramos =

Puerto Rican basketball player (born 1985)

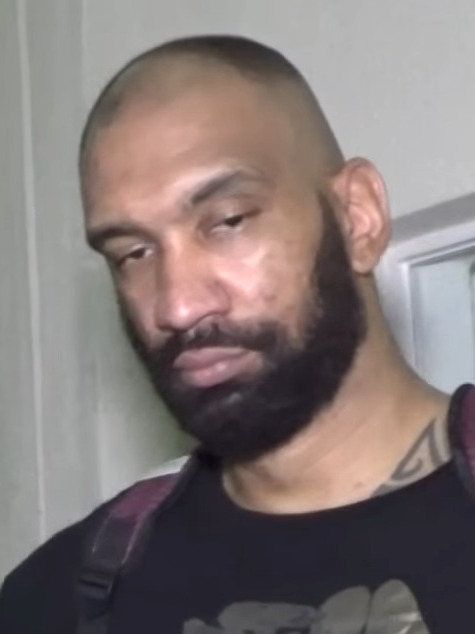
- Ramos in 2017

Personal information
- Born: May 23, 1985 (age 41) Fajardo, Puerto Rico
- Listed height: 7 ft 3 in (2.21 m)
- Listed weight: 275 lb (125 kg)

Career information
- High school: Colegio Bautista de Caguas (Caguas, Puerto Rico)
- NBA draft: 2004: 2nd round, 32nd overall pick
- Drafted by: Washington Wizards
- Playing career: 2001–2020
- Position: Center

Career history
- 2001–2004: Criollos de Caguas
- 2004–2006: Washington Wizards
- 2005–2006: →Roanoke Dazzle
- 2006–2007: Idaho Stampede
- 2007: Criollos de Caguas
- 2007–2008: Baloncesto Fuenlabrada
- 2009–2012: Piratas de Quebradillas
- 2009–2010: Zhejiang Lions
- 2011: Seoul Samsung Thunders
- 2011–2013: Zhejiang Lions
- 2013: Capitanes de Arecibo
- 2013–2014: Qingdao DoubleStar
- 2014: Brujos de Guayama
- 2015: Kia Carnival
- 2015: Brujos de Guayama
- 2015: Metros de Santiago
- 2015–2016: Jilin Northeast Tigers
- 2016: Vaqueros de Bayamón
- 2017: Gallitos de Isabela
- 2017–2018: Kinmen Kaoliang Liquor
- 2018: Leones de Ponce
- 2018–2019: San Miguel Alab Pilipinas
- 2019: Wuhan Dangdai
- 2019–2020: Leones de Ponce

Career highlights
- SBL Best Foreign Player of the year (2018); BSN Most Valuable Player (2015); LNB champion (2015); CBA rebounding leader (2010); 6× BSN First team (2005, 2006, 2008, 2009, 2011, 2015); 8× BSN All-Star (2003, 2005–2011); NBA Development League All-Star (2007); BSN Most Improved Player (2002)
- Stats at NBA.com
- Stats at Basketball Reference
Medals
Men's basketball
Representing Puerto Rico
FIBA AmeriCup
Silver medal – second place	2009 Puerto Rico
Bronze medal – third place	2007 United States
Pan American Games
Silver medal – second place	2007 Brazil
Centrobasket
Gold medal – first place	2010 Dominican Republic
Gold medal – first place	2016 Panama
Silver medal – second place	2004 Dominican Republic
FIBA CBC Championship
Gold medal – first place	2007 Puerto Rico
FIBA Americas U20 Championship
Silver medal – second place	2004 Canada	Under-20

Peter John Ramos Fuentes (born May 23, 1985), is a Puerto Rican former professional basketball player and professional wrestler.

He is the sixth athlete from Puerto Rico to play in the National Basketball Association (NBA) and the third drafted, gathering success in the NBA Development League (NBDL), where he was an All Star during the 2006–07 season. Ramos has also played in Baloncesto Superior Nacional (BSN), the Chinese Basketball Association (CBA) and the Philippine Basketball Association (PBA). He was a member of the Puerto Rico national basketball team from 2004 to 2016, making his Olympic debut in the game where Puerto Rico defeated the United States at Athens.

As a professional wrestler, Ramos began his career in the World Wrestling Council (WWC) in 2019 under the ring-name Mr. Beast

== Biography ==
=== Early life ===
Ramos' father abandoned their home when he was five years old. He would then travel to New York with his mother and siblings. Early in his life, Ramos' unusual height made him victim to verbal harassment. In 1999, when he was fourteen years old, already seven feet tall, Ramos was noticed by former basketball player Santiago Gotay in a clothing store. When Gotay learned that Ramos was born in Puerto Rico he contacted Félix Rivera, owner of the Criollos de Caguas in the National Superior Basketball (BSN).

Rivera decided to recruit Ramos and bring him to the BSN, and traveled to New York to offer him a contract, despite the fact he had not seen him play basketball. Ramos met members of his family when he came to Caguas and he began studies at the Colegio Bautista. Under the guidance of coach Leonel Arril, Ramos began learning the techniques of the basketball game. Ramos continued getting taller, and by 2004 he was already 7'3". He led his high school to two National Championships. In the Puerto Rican Basketball League, Ramos developed quickly and in 2002, he won the Most Improved Player Award. In 2003, he earned a spot in the Puerto Rico national basketball team and participated in the Pan American Games.

=== National Basketball Association ===
Ramos participated in the 2004 season of the BSN, finishing with averages of 20.4 points and 9.4 rebounds per game. In April Ramos announced he would enter the 2004 NBA draft, hinting that he would withdraw if not a top 15 selection. On draft night, he was picked as the 32nd selection in the draft's second round, by the Washington Wizards. Frustrated with himself, Ramos abandoned the ceremony once the first round concluded.

During summer of 2004, Ramos participated with the Wizards during the NBA Summer Pro League, and was a member of the 2004 Puerto Rican National Basketball Team which defeated the United States in the 2004 Olympic Games.

During the 2004–05 NBA season Ramos played in six games scoring 11 points with 4 rebounds and 1 block. Ramos spent most of the year on the inactive/injured reserve list.

During the summer of 2005, Ramos participated with the Wizards during the NBA Summer Pro League for a second straight year.

At the start of the 2005–06 season Ramos was assigned to the Roanoke Dazzle of the NBA Development League. He was called up by the Wizards on January 19, 2006, and reassigned back to Roanoke on 21 January. Ramos finished the season in the NBA D-League second in blocks with 78.

In 2006 Ramos participated with the Wizards during the NBA Summer Pro League for a third straight year. And again represented Puerto Rico in the Basketball World Championship 2006. Ramos was waived by the Washington Wizards during 2006 Pre-Season Training Camp. On November 2, 2006, Ramos was drafted by the Idaho Stampede with the 9th pick of the first round of the 2006 NBA Development League draft. That season Ramos was selected as a participant for the NBDL All-Star Game, but did not participate in All Star game due to injury. On February 28, 2007, Ramos was waived by the Idaho Stampede due to injury. Ramos earned All-NBA Development League Honorable Mention for his 2006–07 performance.

=== Puerto Rico and Europe ===
In 2007 Ramos returned to the Criollos de Caguas of the National Superior Basketball after a two-year absence. He finished with an average of 17.5 points per game.

In 2007, Ramos represented Puerto Rico as a member of the Puerto Rican National Basketball Team during the 2007 Pan American Games, winning the silver medal.

Ramos signed with Alta Gestión Fuenlabrada to play in the 2007–08 season of the Spanish Liga ACB league. Ramos played the 2008 BSN season with averages of 17.5 points and 9.8 rebounds per game. He was selected as a starter in the 2008 BSN All-Star Game, where he was selected the game's most valuable player and scored twenty-two points and nine rebounds. While Caguas participated in the BSN "Super-6" round, Ramos claimed that he had matured since traveling to Spain, which helped him in his game. Ramos later played for the Piratas de Quebradillas, Capitanes de Arecibo and currently is playing with Los Brujos de Guayama in Puerto Rico.

In 2018, he returned to Puerto Rico, to play with the Leones de Ponce. He was selected as part the reserves of the All Star team for the league's all star game against the Puerto Rican National Team.

=== Asia ===
In 2011, Ramos signed with the Seoul Samsung Thunders in South Korea. On November 7, 2011, he was released from Seoul Samsung Thunders after averaging 18.1 pts. and 9.9 reb. In December 2014, Ramos signed with the Kia Carnival at the Philippine Basketball Association and will play as an import for the team at the 2015 PBA Commissioner's Cup. Ramos was chosen by Kia head coach Manny Pacquiao for his shot blocking skills. Kia is banking on Ramos to turn its fortunes around after finishing its maiden PBA conference with a woeful 1–10 win–loss record.

In 2017, the 25th of February, Ramos signed with one of the best Clubs in Asia Club Sagesse from Lebanon.

In 2018, he joined Alab Pilipinas with fellow Puerto Rican, Renaldo Balkman. With Ramos and Balkman, the Philippine squad managed to dominate the league but fell short in two games against the Eastern Sports Club (basketball) of Hong Kong in the playoffs.

== Career stats ==
- Ramos's NBA stats in 6 games are 11 points with a 1.8 PPG, 4 rebounds with a 0.7 RPG, 1 block with a 0.2 BPG, a .500 field goal and .500 free throw percentage.
- His NBA Development League stats in 76 games with 73 starts, 1,075 points with a 14.1 PPG, 80 assists with a 1.1 APG, 541 rebounds with a 7.1 RPG, 123 blocks with a 1.6 BPG, 23 steals with a 0.3 SPG, .574 field goal percentage and .606 free-throw percentage.

=== Domestic leagues ===
Season	Team	League	GP	MPG	FG%	3P%	FT%	RPG	APG	SPG	BPG	PPG
2001	Criollos de Caguas	Puerto Rico BSN	4	?	.000	--	.000	.5	.3	?	?	.0
2002	Criollos de Caguas	Puerto Rico BSN	23	?	.410	--	.400	2.6	.3	?	?	2.4
2003	Criollos de Caguas	Puerto Rico BSN	30	?	.530	--	.600	8.6	1.0	?	?	12.3
2004	Criollos de Caguas	Puerto Rico BSN	29	?	.510	.000	.580	9.4	2.8	?	?	20.1
2005–06	Roanoke Dazzle	D-League	44	29.3	.594	.000	.603	7.7	1.0	.3	1.9	14.9
2006–07	Idaho Stampede	D-League	33	27.2	.554	--	.617	6.3	1.2	.2	1.4	13.2
2007	Criollos de Caguas	Puerto Rico BSN	30	?	.550	.000	.570	11.2	1.7	?	?	16.2
2007–08	Alta Gestión Fuenlabrada	Liga ACB	20	14.8	.557	.000	.739	4.2	.1	.4	1.1	6.3
2008	Criollos de Caguas	Puerto Rico BSN	32	?	.570	.333	.710	9.8	1.7	?	?	17.6
2008–09	Alta Gestión Fuenlabrada	Liga ACB	26	15.0	.612	--	.560	4.0	.2	.2	.5	6.0
2009	Piratas de Quebradillas	Puerto Rico BSN	28	?	.660	.250	.530	10.9	1.4	?	?	16.5
2009–10	Zhejiang Lions	China CBA	38	30.7	.682	.000	.677	13.0	1.5	.3	1.1	17.5
2010	Piratas de Quebradillas	Puerto Rico BSN	16	?	.570	.000	.570	11.6	1.7	?	?	18.8
2010–11	Zhejiang Lions	China CBA	35	37.6	.644	.000	.738	13.9	1.9	.7	1.2	24.8
2011	Piratas de Quebradillas	Puerto Rico BSN	29	?	.550	.220	.700	10.8	2.2	?	?	23.3
2011–12	Seoul Samsung Thunders	South Korea KBL	15	36.7	.614	.000	.611	9.8	3.2	.4	1.2	21.5
2011–12	Zhejiang Lions	China CBA	30	34.6	.632	.000	.670	13.3	1.8	.3	.9	21.9
2012	Piratas de Quebradillas	Puerto Rico BSN	40	30.4	.599	.250	.652	8.8	1.6	.3	1.2	17.1
2012–13	Zhejiang Lions	China CBA	35	34.0	.655	--	.652	11.0	1.5	.4	.9	22.7
2013	Capitanes de Arecibo	Puerto Rico BSN	36	30.0	.548	.250	.647	8.8	1.4	.1	.5	14.6
2013–14	Qingdao DoubleStar	China CBA	32	31.7	.625	.000	.755	9.5	1.5	.3	.7	20.5
2014	Brujos de Guayama	Puerto Rico BSN	40	27.6	.564	.273	.621	7.8	1.4	.2	1.0	13.0
2014	Kia Carnival	Philippines PBA	11	43.1	.540	.208	.618	21.2	3.0	.0	1.2	35.9
2015	Brujos de Guayama	Puerto Rico BSN	38	35.6	.609	.250	.640	11.8	1.6	.1	.9	22.7
2015	Metros de Santiago	Dominican LNB	3	27.3	.643	--	.727	10.7	.3	.0	3.0	20.7
2014–15	Jilin Northeast Tigers	China CBA	34	27.4	.584	--	.584	10.0	.9	.3	.6	19.1

== Career accomplishments ==
- He became the third ever Puerto Rican player to be drafted by an NBA team
- 2002 BSN Most Improved Player Award
- 2006–07 NBDL All-Star
- 2006–07 All-NBDL Honorable Mention

== Professional wrestling career ==
La Bestia / Mr. Beast
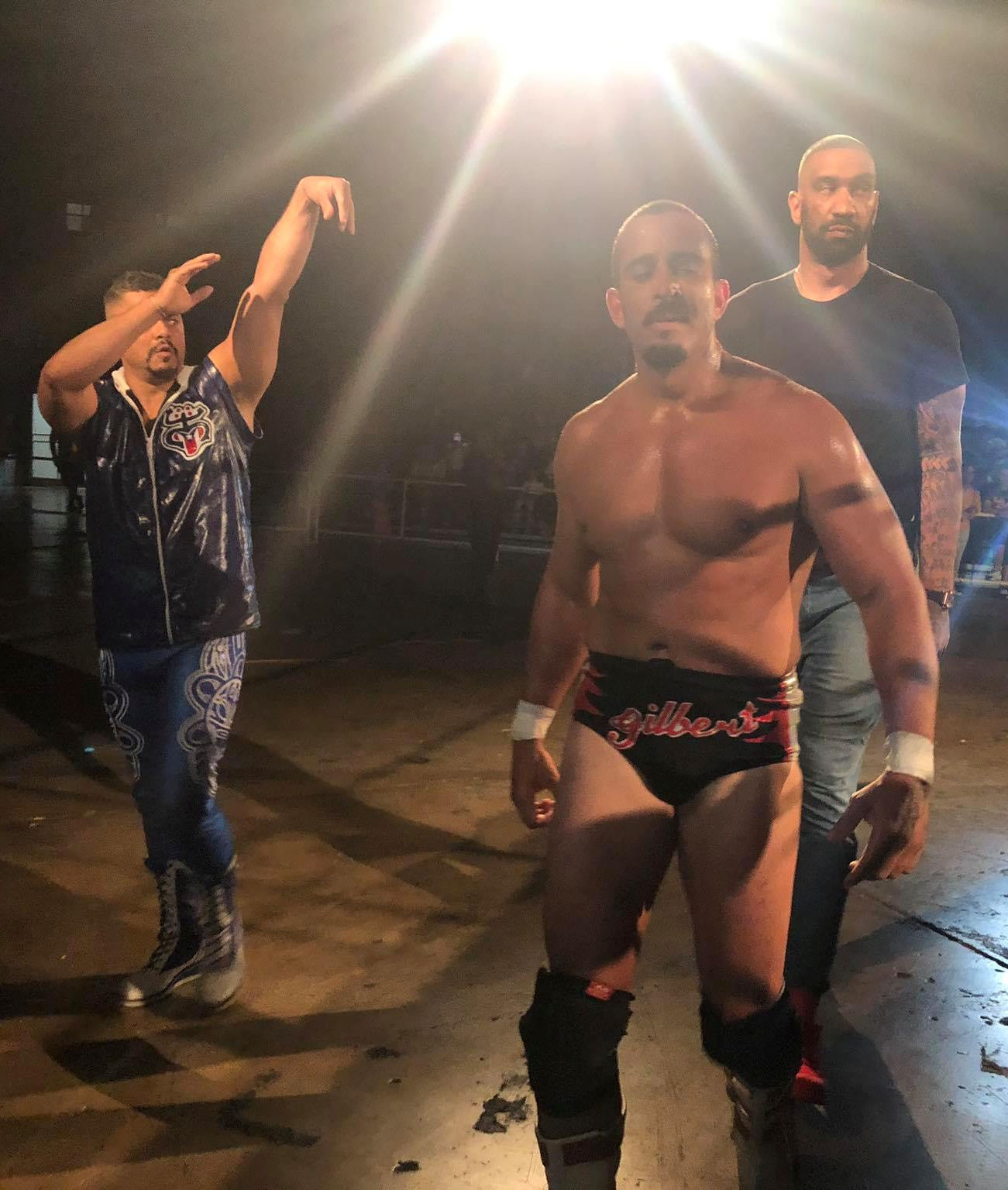
- The Dynasty. From left to right Eddie Colón, Gilbert and Peter John Ramos.

Professional wrestling career
- Debut: February 15, 2020

=== World Wrestling Council (2019–2020) ===
In 2016, Ramos expressed interest in making a crossover into professional wrestling following his retirement from basketball, noting he had already declined invitations to do so. Others in his family were already involved in the business, his brother-in-law is an in-ring performer and his sister is a referee. Two years later he reaffirmed this plan, believing that the retirement of several high-profile tall wrestlers created more opportunities to succeed. On September 18, 2019, Ramos made his first backstage appearance for the World Wrestling Council, becoming involved in a segment with Puerto Rico Heavyweight Champion Pedro Portillo III. This led to Ramos appearing as the guest referee of a retirement match between Ray González and Gilbert (storyline boss to Portillo) at Noche de Campeones. Prior to this, Carlos Colón Sr. noted that he was monitoring his progress.

Ramos was booked in a heel turn on González, afterward joining the villainous faction known as El Sindicato, which was disbanded at the end of the season. Afterwards he became the enforcer of a nascent stable known as The Dynasty, joining Eddie Colón and Gilbert. Ramos’ in ring debut took place on January 25, 2020, in a handicap match where he easily defeated two independent wrestlers. The following week he scored another swift win over Jax, a third party performer for the regional Borinquén Sport Promotion (BSP). An extreme rules match against fellow multi-sport athlete Carlos Cotto was scheduled for February 15, 2019, but later postponed when Ramos refused to perform in “a small town” by citing contractual clauses. This role actually helped his basketball career, since it allowed him to drop 30 pounds and begin the 2020 BSN season in shape.

=== Beast Mode (2020–present) ===
During the hiatus caused by the COVID-19 pandemic, Ramos left WWC and joined Germán Figueroa to form a team known as Beast Mode, with Qatar Pro Wrestling as their first promotion abroad. When the BSN resumed the 2020 season in a bubble, he didn't participate with the Leones in order to dedicate full time to professional wrestling. On December 18, 2021, Beast Mode made its debut for Organization International de Lucha (OIL) with a win over Sons of Samoa. The alliance that this company had with Robles Promotions led to Ramos wrestling in Mexico in January 2022, adopting Mr. Beast as his ring name. The team also made appearances for Wrestling República Dominicana (WRD).

In 2023, Ramos joined the National Wrestling Alliance (NWA) and debuted in NWA Powerrr against Trevor Murdoch, performing under the ring name Beast Mode.

== See also ==
- List of Puerto Ricans
- Puerto Rico at the 2004 Summer Olympics
- List of tallest players in National Basketball Association history
- Puerto Rico Men's National Basketball Team
- José "Piculín" Ortiz
- Carlos Arroyo
- Jorge Brian Díaz
