= 2020–21 Chinese Basketball Association season =

CBA
- Season: 2020–21
- Duration: 17 October–14 November 2020; 2 December 2020–6 February 2021; 1–18 March 2021; 24 March–13 April 2021 (Regular season); 16–25 April 2021 (Playoffs); 27 April–1 May 2021 (Finals)
- Games played: 56
- Teams: 19

Regular season
- Top seed: Guangdong Southern Tigers
- Season MVP: Wu Qian

Finals
- Champions: Guangdong Southern Tigers
- Runners-up: Liaoning Flying Leopards
- Semifinalists: Shandong Heroes; Zhejiang Golden Bulls

The 2020–21 CBA season was the 26th season of the Chinese Basketball Association (CBA). All games were played in Zhuji, Zhejiang. The regular season was divided into four stages. The first stage began on 17 October 2020 and ended on 14 November 2020. The second stage began on 2 December 2020 and ended on 6 February 2021. The third stage began on 1 March 2021 and ended on 18 March 2021. The last stage began on 24 March 2021 and ended on 13 April 2021. The All-Star Game was played on 21 March 2021 in Qingdao. The playoffs began on 16 April 2021 and ended on 1 May 2021.

== Changes from 2019–20 season ==
For this season, each team will play 56 games in the regular season. 20 teams are divided into two groups based on the ranking of the previous season. Each team will play against teams in their group four times and play against other teams twice.

== Transactions ==
=== Free agents ===
Player	Date signed	New team	Former team	Ref
Yu Changdong	1 September 2020	Beijing Royal Fighters	Xinjiang Flying Tigers	
Guo Kailun	4 September 2020	Nanjing Monkey Kings	Guangzhou Loong Lions	
Huang Shiqian	4 September 2020	Nanjing Monkey Kings	Shanghai Sharks	
Wan Shengwei	4 September 2020	Nanjing Monkey Kings	Guangdong Southern Tigers	
Zhao Tianyi	4 September 2020	Nanjing Monkey Kings	Zhejiang Lions	
Han Delong	8 September 2020	Guangzhou Loong Lions	Bayi Rockets	
Shirelijan Muxtar	9 September 2020	Nanjing Monkey Kings	Xinjiang Flying Tigers	
Heng Yifeng	10 September 2020	Nanjing Monkey Kings	Guangzhou Loong Lions	
Feng Xin	12 September 2020	Zhejiang Lions	Nanjing Monkey Kings	
Sun Chunpeng	12 September 2020	Zhejiang Lions	Fujian Sturgeons	
Han Shuo	13 September 2020	Sichuan Blue Whales	Bayi Rockets	
He Zhongda	13 September 2020	Shanghai Sharks	Fujian Sturgeons	
Li Honghan	13 September 2020	Sichuan Blue Whales	Shandong Heroes	
Liu Cheng	13 September 2020	Shanghai Sharks	Zhejiang Lions	
Liu Guancen	13 September 2020	Shanxi Loongs	Shandong Heroes	
Wang Xu	13 September 2020	Shanghai Sharks	Beijing Ducks	
Wu Ke	13 September 2020	Shanxi Loongs	Shandong Heroes	
Yu Dehao	13 September 2020	Xinjiang Flying Tigers	Shenzhen Aviators	
Zhai Yi	13 September 2020	Shanxi Loongs	Qingdao Eagles	
Zhou Zhandong	13 September 2020	Shanxi Loongs	Qingdao Eagles	
Yu Changchun	13 September 2020	Fujian Sturgeons	Nanjing Monkey Kings	
Ding Haoran	13 September 2020	Jilin Northeast Tigers	Qingdao Eagles	
Diao Chenghao	13 September 2020	Shandong Heroes	Fujian Sturgeons	
Jing Haoyang	13 September 2020	Shandong Heroes	Beijing Royal Fighters	
Li Jingyu	13 September 2020	Shandong Heroes	Shanxi Loongs	
Liang Yingqi	13 September 2020	Xinjiang Flying Tigers	Bayi Rockets	
Wang Zhengbo	13 September 2020	Xinjiang Flying Tigers	Sichuan Blue Whales	
Cao Fei	14 September 2020	Nanjing Monkey Kings	Fujian Sturgeons	
Chang Yasong	14 September 2020	Shenzhen Aviators	Beijing Royal Fighters	
Guo Xiaopeng	14 September 2020	Shenzhen Aviators	Shanxi Loongs	
Hou Xingyu	14 September 2020	Shenzhen Aviators	Shanxi Loongs	
Merdan Turson	14 September 2020	Shenzhen Aviators	Nanjing Monkey Kings	
Wang Zixu	14 September 2020	Nanjing Monkey Kings	Beijing Royal Fighters	
Yu Liang	14 September 2020	Shenzhen Aviators	Beijing Royal Fighters	

=== Loan ===
Player	Date loaned	New team	Former team	Ref
Wu Yujia	9 September 2020	Jiangsu Dragons	Zhejiang Lions	
Sun Haofeng	10 September 2020	Guangzhou Loong Lions	Beijing Ducks	
Li Yingbo	11 September 2020	Fujian Sturgeons	Guangdong Southern Tigers	
Liu Xucheng	11 September 2020	Fujian Sturgeons	Guangdong Southern Tigers	
Yu Xiaohui	14 September 2020	Sichuan Blue Whales	Xinjiang Flying Tigers	
Sun Mingyang		Guangzhou Loong Lions	Xinjiang Flying Tigers	
Bai Jie		Nanjing Monkey Kings	Zhejiang Golden Bulls	
Jiang Wen		Xinjiang Flying Tigers	Zhejiang Lions	

=== Trades ===
August
To Beijing Royal Fighters: Li Gen	To Shanghai Sharks: Gao Shang; Zong Zan
To Beijing Royal Fighters: Hou Yifan	To Jiangsu Dragons: Xu Mengjun
To Liaoning Flying Leopards: Zhu Rongzhen (on loan)	To Shandong Heroes: Gao Shiyan (on loan); Guo Xu (on loan)

=== Transfers ===
Player	Date signed	New team	Former team	Ref
Liu Yuchen	4 September 2020	Nanjing Monkey Kings	Zhejiang Golden Bulls	
Li Muhao	9 September 2020	Beijing Ducks	Shenzhen Aviators	
Wang Haoyu	9 September 2020	Nanjing Monkey Kings	Guangdong Southern Tigers	
Fan Ziming	10 September 2020	Beijing Ducks	Xinjiang Flying Tigers	
Zhao Yanman	10 September 2020	Guangzhou Loong Lions	Beijing Ducks	
Yu Gang	10 September 2020	Nanjing Monkey Kings	Sichuan Blue Whales	
Liu Yunan	12 September 2020	Nanjing Monkey Kings	Xinjiang Flying Tigers	
Kelanbaike Makan	13 September 2020	Shanghai Sharks	Xinjiang Flying Tigers	
Su Ruoyu	13 September 2020	Sichuan Blue Whales	Zhejiang Lions	
Jeff Wu	13 September 2020	Xinjiang Flying Tigers	Shanghai Sharks	
Li Bairun	14 September 2020	Shenzhen Aviators	Nanjing Monkey Kings	

== Teams ==
Team	Head coach	Home city	Arena	Capacity	Ref.
Beijing Ducks	(Greece) Yannis Christopoulos	Beijing	Cadillac Center	17,178	
Beijing Royal Fighters	(United States) Stephon Marbury	Beijing	Olympic Sports Center Gymnasium	6,500	
Fujian Sturgeons	(Serbia) (New Zealand) Nenad Vučinić	Jinjiang	Zuchang Gymnasium	4,500	
Guangdong Southern Tigers	(China) Du Feng	Dongguan	Dongguan Basketball Center	16,000	
Guangzhou Loong Lions	(China) Guo Shiqiang	Guangzhou	Tianhe Gymnasium	8,000	
Jiangsu Dragons	(China) Li Nan	Suzhou	Suzhou Sports Center Gymnasium	6,000	
Jilin Northeast Tigers	(China) Wang Han	Changchun	Changchun Gymnasium	4,000	
Liaoning Flying Leopards	(China) Yang Ming	Shenyang	Liaoning Gymnasium	12,000	
Nanjing Monkey Kings	(China) Ma Zhuang (caretaker)	Nanjing	Wutaishan Gymnasium	9,300	
Qingdao Eagles	(China) Wu Qinglong	Qingdao	Conson Gymnasium	12,500	
Shandong Heroes	(China) Gong Xiaobin	Jinan	Shandong Arena	8,000	
Shanghai Sharks	(Croatia) Neven Spahija	Shanghai	Yuanshen Sports Centre Gymnasium	5,091	
Shanxi Loongs	(China) Pan Jiang	Taiyuan	Shanxi Sports Centre Gymnasium	8,131	
Shenzhen Aviators	(China) Qiu Biao	Shenzhen	Shenzhen Dayun Arena	18,000	
Sichuan Blue Whales	(China) Zhou Jinli	Chengdu	Wenjiang Gymnasium	4,500	
Tianjin Pioneers	(China) Liu Tie	Tianjin	TUFE Gymnasium	4,000	
Xinjiang Flying Tigers	(China) Adiljan Jun	Ürümqi	Hongshan Arena	4,000	
Zhejiang Golden Bulls	(China) Liu Weiwei	Hangzhou	Binjiang Gymnasium	5,000	
Zhejiang Lions	(China) Wang Bo	Zhuji	Zhuji Jiyang Sports Center Gymnasium	6,077	

=== Managerial changes ===
Team	Outgoing manager	Manner of departure	Date of vacancy	Position in table	Incoming manager	Date of appointment
Shenzhen Aviators	(China) Wang Jianjun	Mutual consent	6 August 2020	Pre-season	(China) Qiu Biao	6 August 2020
Guangzhou Loong Lions	(China) Ding Wei	Mutual consent	8 August 2020	Pre-season	(China) Guo Shiqiang	8 August 2020
Jiangsu Dragons	(Slovenia) Memi Bečirovič	Mutual consent	19 August 2020	Pre-season	(China) Li Nan	19 August 2020
Nanjing Monkey Kings	(China) Cui Wanjun	Mutual consent	22 August 2020	Pre-season	(Slovenia) Memi Bečirovič	23 August 2020
Beijing Ducks	(Greece) Yannis Christopoulos	Mutual consent	13 September 2020	Pre-season	(Italy) Simone Pianigiani	13 September 2020
Shanghai Sharks	(China) Liu Wei	Appointed as assistant coach	15 September 2020	Pre-season	(Croatia) Neven Spahija	15 September 2020
Shanxi Loongs	(China) Wang Fei	Mutual consent	17 September 2020	Pre-season	(China) Ding Wei	18 September 2020
Fujian Sturgeons	(China) Zhu Shilong	Appointed as assistant coach	29 October 2020		(Serbia) (New Zealand) Nenad Vučinić	29 October 2020
Zhejiang Lions	(China) Li Chunjiang	Sacked	22 December 2020		(China) Wang Bo	22 December 2020
Beijing Ducks	(Italy) Simone Pianigiani	Sacked	23 December 2020		(China) Xie Libin	23 December 2020
Beijing Ducks	(China) Xie Libin	Mutual consent	8 February 2021	12th	(Greece) Yannis Christopoulos	8 February 2021
Shanxi Loongs	(China) Ding Wei	Mutual consent	19 February 2021	14th	(China) Pan Jiang	19 February 2021
Nanjing Monkey Kings	(Slovenia) Memi Bečirovič	Mutual consent	28 February 2021	18th	(China) Ma Zhuang (caretaker)	28 February 2021

== Draft ==
The 2020 CBA Draft, the sixth edition of the CBA draft, took place on 21 August 2020 in Quanzhou, Fujian. 19 players were selected in the draft.

Rnd.	Pick	Player	Nationality (Note: Nationality indicates the player's national team or representative nationality. If a player has not competed at the international level, then the nationality indicates the national team which the player is eligible to represent according to FIBA rules.)	Team	School / club team
1	1	Ou Junxuan	China	Shanghai Sharks	California State University, Northridge (US NCAA)
1	2	Zhu Mingzhen	China	Guangzhou Loong Lions	Peking University
1	3	Lin Ting-chien	Chinese Taipei	Tianjin Pioneers	Bryant University (US NCAA)
1	4	Zhu Songwei	China	Sichuan Blue Whales	Shantou University
1	5	Zheng Qilong	China	Jiangsu Dragons	Tsinghua University
1	6	Jiaoengeer Huyishan	China	Nanjing Monkey Kings	Xinjiang University
1	7	Meng Xiang	China	Shenzhen Aviators	Huaqiao University
1	8	Zhang Ning	China	Shanxi Loongs	Peking University
1	10	Liu Yi	China	Shandong Heroes	Beijing Sport University
1	12	Cheng Feng	China	Fujian Sturgeons	Xiamen University
1	14	Li Rui	China	Beijing Royal Fighters	Shanxi University
1	16	Yang Haozhe	China	Nanjing Monkey Kings (from Beijing Ducks)	Beijing Sport University
1	18	Du Jiabao	China	Liaoning Flying Leopards	Free Agent
2	1	Duan Fengwei	China	Tianjin Pioneers	Chongqing University of Arts and Sciences
2	2	He Junjian	China	Guangzhou Loong Lions	Foshan Kung-Fu Boy (NBL)
2	6	Liu Ziqi	China	Nanjing Monkey Kings	Shanghai Sharks Youth
2	8	Wang Jiamian	China	Shanxi Loongs	Liaoning Flying Leopards Youth
2	14	Zhu Zhaojing	China	Beijing Royal Fighters	Free Agent
2	16	Wang Ziqi	China	Nanjing Monkey Kings (from Beijing Ducks)	Hebei Xianglan (NBL)

== Foreign players ==
=== Import chart ===
This is the full list of international players competing in the CBA during the 2020–21 season.

Team	Player 1	Player 2	Player 3	Player 4	Replaced
Beijing Ducks	(United States) Jonathan Gibson	(United States) (Croatia) Justin Hamilton	(United States) Jordan McRae	-	-
Beijing Royal Fighters	(United States) Andrew Harrison	(United States) Joe Young	(Nigeria) Ekpe Udoh	-	(Tunisia) Salah Mejri
Fujian Sturgeons	(United States) Trae Golden	(Canada) Andrew Nicholson	-	-	-
Guangdong Southern Tigers	(United States) MarShon Brooks	(United States) Jason Thompson	(United States) Sonny Weems	-	-
Guangzhou Loong Lions	(United States) Isaac Haas	(United States) Dallas Moore	(United States) Marreese Speights	-	-
Jiangsu Dragons	(United States) Dez Wells	-	-	-	(United States) Devin Williams
Jilin Northeast Tigers	(United States) Dominique Jones	-	-	-	-
Liaoning Flying Leopards	(United States) Kyle Fogg	(United States) O. J. Mayo	(United States) Jeremy Tyler	-	(United States) Jonathon Simmons
Nanjing Monkey Kings	(United States) Sean Hill	(United States) Arnett Moultrie	-	-	-
Qingdao Eagles	(United States) (Bulgaria) Darius Adams	(United States) Dakari Johnson	-	-	(Serbia) Vladimir Štimac
Shandong Heroes	(United States) Troy Gillenwater	(United States) Lester Hudson	-	-	(United States) Manny Harris
Shanghai Sharks	(United States) Marcus Denmon	(United States) Jimmer Fredette	-	-	-
Shanxi Loongs	(United States) Jamaal Franklin	(United States) Ricky Ledo	(United States) Eric Moreland	-	-
Shenzhen Aviators	(United States) Askia Booker	(United States) Kenny Boynton	-	-	-
Sichuan Blue Whales	(United States) Marcus Georges-Hunt	(Iran) Hamed Haddadi	(United States) Russ Smith	-	-
Tianjin Pioneers	(Montenegro) Marko Todorović	(United States) D'Montre Edwards	(United States) Clarence Trotter III	-	-
Xinjiang Flying Tigers	(United States) Ian Clark	(Lithuania) Donatas Motiejūnas	-	-	-
Zhejiang Golden Bulls	(United States) Sylven Landesberg	(Senegal) Maurice Ndour	(United States) (Serbia) Nick Rakocevic	-	(United States) Brandon Paul
Zhejiang Lions	(United States) Kay Felder	(Serbia) Miroslav Raduljica	-	-	(United States) Wilson Chandler

== Regular season ==
=== League table ===
#	2020–21 CBA regular season					
#	Team	P	W	L	Pct.	Tiebreaker
1	Guangdong Southern Tigers	52	46	6	.885	
2	Liaoning Flying Leopards	54	45	9	.833	
3	Zhejiang Golden Bulls	52	41	11	.788	
4	Xinjiang Flying Tigers	54	34	20	.630	
5	Shandong Heroes	54	33	21	.611	
6	Qingdao Eagles	54	32	22	.593	
7	Zhejiang Lions	52	30	22	.577	
8	Shenzhen Aviators	52	29	23	.558	
9	Beijing Ducks	52	28	24	.538	
10	Jilin Northeast Tigers	54	28	26	.519	
11	Sichuan Blue Whales	54	26	26	.500	
12	Guangzhou Loong Lions	54	25	29	.463	
13	Beijing Royal Fighters	54	25	29	.463	
14	Shanghai Sharks	52	22	30	.423	
15	Shanxi Loongs	52	19	33	.365	
16	Fujian Sturgeons	52	13	39	.250	
17	Tianjin Pioneers	54	11	43	.204	
18	Nanjing Monkey Kings	54	9	45	.167	
19	Jiangsu Dragons	54	8	46	.148	

Key to colors
Top 4 teams advance directly to Quarter-finals of CBA Playoffs
5th-12th place teams progress to First Round of CBA Playoffs

=== Results ===
19 teams are divided into two groups based on the ranking of the previous season. Each team will play against teams in their group four times and play against other teams twice.

Home \ Away	BJD	BJR	FJS	GDS	GZL	JSD	JLN	LNF	NJM	QDE	SDH	SHS	SXL	SZA	SCB	TJP	XJF	ZJG	ZJL	BJD	BJR	FJS	GDS	GZL	JSD	JLN	LNF	NJM	QDE	SDH	SHS	SXL	SZA	SCB	TJP	XJF	ZJG	ZJL
Beijing Ducks		93–83	80–71	107–111	102–100	120–91	102–105	83–105	126–88	78–75	102–96	111–97	97–109	92–78	111–113 (OT)	95–84	82–66	75–92	104–109 (OT)			125–92	83–90								104–94	91–84	92–95	95–86			109–99	93–116
Beijing Royal Fighters	109–98		126–104	96–127	103–114	87–79	81–99	91–111	120–88	105–92	83–99	122–96	93–85	114–106	109–105	111–95	109–78	102–112	94–101					107–91	105–70	112–108 (OT)	85–91	92–112	99–108	85–94					122–82	100–93		
Fujian Sturgeons	124–91	123–111		145–153	115–118 (OT)	103–96	105–109	97–110	90–104	106–111	107–115	87–116	92–99	94–115	79–89	122–111	92–126	83–99	100–125	90–99			110–125								115–128	129–111	118–104	104–113			107–121	102–130
Guangdong Southern Tigers	118–101	127–109	123–111		110–104	106–97	110–111	118–115	161–109	135–122	131–112	119–105	131–106	132–104	121–90	110–87	115–102	113–138	115–106	94–89		137–122									92–117	94–89 (OT)	114–95	107–92			81–105	122–114
Guangzhou Loong Lions	102–114	92–80	124–118	98–105		92–73	94–101	96–102	110–111	88–112	94–111	96–95	105–94	96–98	91–104	96–85	97–102	104–108	103–108		119–92				90–89	95–120	91–99	124–109	111–116	115–117					147–140 (2OT)	93–110		
Jiangsu Dragons	95–100	76–94	108–128	98–120	86–104		98–100 (OT)	86–107	108–93	94–102	126–125 (OT)	94–113	106–111	95–114	94–103	110–106	97–109	85–105	116–112		80–105			94–119		94–111	109–122	93–105	103–90	73–111					94–98	98–112		
Jilin Northeast Tigers	89–102	109–101	117–110	106–111	99–87	110–92		91–112	105–97	105–84	93–106	102–101	107–116	111–121	111–119	91–99	90–97	94–116	105–104		92–105			85–103	111–94		97–109	108–89	111–112	116–113					114–108	112–119		
Liaoning Flying Leopards	104–96	122–108	126–105	124–115 (OT)	117–82	123–80	111–99		125–99	126–103	110–100	117–95	125–110	117–103	93–79	121–108	111–118	129–116	94–114		107–99			95–93	112–119	100–83		112–83	113–110	117–105					108–88	96–84		
Nanjing Monkey Kings	89–119	82–110	116–131	92–114	79–100	120–113 (OT)	103–118	105–111		104–118	96–114	83–110	90–108	86–127	97–111	92–83	108–112	86–119	92–99		100–127			107–121	109–99	125–122	82–105		101–117	98–124					102–100	100–109		
Qingdao Eagles	102–94	127–95	117–97	104–120	97–94	113–114	115–88	99–105	116–95		103–91	101–109	102–105 (OT)	139–133 (OT)	90–98	104–96	112–89	110–103	113–90		106–99			94–114	120–111	107–99	94–112	145–111		117–112					122–115	136–117		
Shandong Heroes	89–86	112–95	115–99	90–104	94–96	100–96 (OT)	111–105	128–127 (OT)	87–69	111–93		114–120	113–84	107–113	118–89	131–100	97–99	119–120	105–104		118–88			113–103	91–83	102–108	109–122	114–106	110–106						115–98	112–106		
Shanghai Sharks	99–102	100–114	117–93	92–136	98–93	112–97	107–102	122–115 (OT)	108–106	116–109	88–98		95–88	117–108	102–90	121–96	110–97	123–124	98–102	96–103		98–110	120–146									103–93	93–113	122–102			103–113	123–111
Shanxi Loongs	110–95	95–89	102–85	91–130	100–114	100–84	86–98	87–124	94–92	94–103	91–94	121–118		87–96	103–108	98–103	101–112	112–102	123–111	114–125		119–135	91–119								102–93		87–98	80–94			81–97	74–96
Shenzhen Aviators	84–98	119–94	140–134	126–134	112–103	111–100	108–96	104–117	106–93	95–118	110–107	93–91	112–107		93–83	126–95	104–103	104–106	80–87	100–84		102–114	98–109								113–99	116–93		114–106 (OT)			95–109	103–96
Sichuan Blue Whales	81–80	97–93	90–80	90–111	111–114 (OT)	108–89	107–109	115–102	93–73	110–109	114–106	102–96	92–87	100–92		108–99	98–103	99–130	96–97	86–96		113–121	88–114								136–129 (2OT)	107–101	108–115				101–106	108–112
Tianjin Pioneers	84–101	80–87	117–113	114–138	95–108	105–108	97–105	91–119	92–84	105–113	102–120	113–94	100–108	90–83	112–110		112–121	85–106	136–133 (OT)		96–99			111–112 (OT)	124–119 (OT)	93–103	106–114	106–94	93–134	86–106						91–105		
Xinjiang Flying Tigers	106–88	123–92	130–102	95–132	90–93	113–100	97–108	108–121	116–94	113–101	111–94	108–98	119–88	98–114	107–92	117–106		99–93	102–112		113–97			94–105	119–88	109–99	89–83	119–94	129–106	98–114					119–106			
Zhejiang Golden Bulls	94–92	100–93	143–90	125–133	96–86	129–110	112–107	107–117	120–92	127–120	124–111	102–84	105–93	91–74	116–106	113–99	123–108		125–100	106–104		97–107	119–125								85–80	94–106 (OT)	115–111	103–99				93–104
Zhejiang Lions	99–101	105–115	133–118	139–131	104–89	94–90	98–123	109–102	113–100	109–115 (OT)	125–121	122–94	103–113	99–88	110–112	133–109	87–65	104–113		107–83		139–101	117–119								117–112 (OT)	100–102	103–99	105–110			90–100	

Source: Results
Legend: Blue = home team win; Red = away team win.
Matches with lighter background shading were decided after overtime.

== Playoffs ==
=== Bracket ===
First round One-off
8	Shenzhen Aviators	0
9	Beijing Ducks	1
5	Shandong Heroes	1
12	Guangzhou Loong Lions	0
6	Qingdao Eagles	1
11	Sichuan Blue Whales	0
7	Zhejiang Lions	1
10	Jilin Northeast Tigers	0

Quarter-finals; One-off
1	Guangdong Southern Tigers	1
9	Beijing Ducks	0
4	Xinjiang Flying Tigers	0
5	Shandong Heroes	1
3	Zhejiang Golden Bulls	1
6	Qingdao Eagles	0
2	Liaoning Flying Leopards	1
7	Zhejiang Lions	0

Semi-finals; Best-of-three
1	Guangdong Southern Tigers	2
5	Shandong Heroes	0
3	Zhejiang Golden Bulls	0
2	Liaoning Flying Leopards	2

Finals; Best-of-three
1	Guangdong Southern Tigers	2
2	Liaoning Flying Leopards	1

- Bold Series winner

=== First round ===
==== (5) Shandong Heroes vs. (12) Guangzhou Loong Lions ====
16 April 2021
19:35

Boxscore

Shandong Heroes	119–107	Guangzhou Loong Lions
Scoring by quarter: 30–24, 33–28, 32–23, 24–32

Zhuji Jiyang College Gymnasium, Zhuji

==== (6) Qingdao Eagles vs. (11) Sichuan Blue Whales ====
17 April 2021
19:35

Boxscore

Qingdao Eagles	93–91	Sichuan Blue Whales
Scoring by quarter: 21–18, 23–20, 26–31, 23–22

Zhuji Jiyang College Gymnasium, Zhuji

==== (7) Zhejiang Lions vs. (10) Jilin Northeast Tigers ====
17 April 2021
15:00

Boxscore

Zhejiang Lions	105–88	Jilin Northeast Tigers
Scoring by quarter: 19–16, 12–20, 40–26, 34–26

Zhuji Jiyang College Gymnasium, Zhuji

==== (8) Shenzhen Aviators vs. (9) Beijing Ducks ====
16 April 2021
15:00

Boxscore

Shenzhen Aviators	97–108	Beijing Ducks
Scoring by quarter: 27–36, 21–32, 23–15, 26–25

Zhuji Jiyang College Gymnasium, Zhuji

=== Quarter-finals ===
==== (1) Guangdong Southern Tigers vs. (9) Beijing Ducks ====
18 April 2021
15:00

Boxscore

Guangdong Southern Tigers	104–103	Beijing Ducks
Scoring by quarter: 27–26, 23–25, 22–34, 32–18

Zhuji Jiyang College Gymnasium, Zhuji

==== (2) Liaoning Flying Leopards vs. (7) Zhejiang Lions ====
19 April 2021
15:00

Boxscore

Liaoning Flying Leopards	105–98	Zhejiang Lions
Scoring by quarter: 25–25, 19–27, 27–14, 34–32

Zhuji Jiyang College Gymnasium, Zhuji

==== (3) Zhejiang Golden Bulls vs. (6) Qingdao Eagles ====
19 April 2021
19:35

Boxscore

Zhejiang Golden Bulls	111–98	Qingdao Eagles
Scoring by quarter: 31–17, 29–22, 36–21, 15–38

Zhuji Jiyang College Gymnasium, Zhuji

==== (4) Xinjiang Flying Tigers vs. (5) Shandong Heroes ====
18 April 2021
19:35

Boxscore

Xinjiang Flying Tigers	101–105	Shandong Heroes
Scoring by quarter: 29–24, 28–34, 22–19, 22–28

Zhuji Jiyang College Gymnasium, Zhuji

=== Semi-finals ===
==== (1) Guangdong Southern Tigers vs. (5) Shandong Heroes ====
20 April 2021
19:35

Boxscore

Guangdong Southern Tigers	117–99	Shandong Heroes
Scoring by quarter: 35–16, 35–24, 25–27, 22–32
Guangdong leads series, 1-0

Zhuji Jiyang College Gymnasium, Zhuji

22 April 2021
19:35

Boxscore

Shandong Heroes	112–118	Guangdong Southern Tigers
Scoring by quarter: 37–32, 18–29, 33–30, 24–27
Guangdong wins series, 2-0

Zhuji Jiyang College Gymnasium, Zhuji

==== (2) Liaoning Flying Leopards vs. (3) Zhejiang Golden Bulls ====
21 April 2021
19:35

Boxscore

Liaoning Flying Leopards	119–103	Zhejiang Golden Bulls
Scoring by quarter: 30–19, 29–26, 28–25, 32–33
Liaoning leads series, 1-0

Zhuji Jiyang College Gymnasium, Zhuji

23 April 2021
19:35

Boxscore

Zhejiang Golden Bulls	117–122	Liaoning Flying Leopards
Scoring by quarter: 26–32, 32–33, 29–30, 30–27
Liaoning wins series, 2-0

Zhuji Jiyang College Gymnasium, Zhuji

=== Finals ===
==== (1) Guangdong Southern Tigers vs. (2) Liaoning Flying Leopards ====
27 April 2021
19:35

Boxscore

Guangdong Southern Tigers	88–83	Liaoning Flying Leopards
Scoring by quarter: 17–16, 24–13, 19–26, 28–28
Guangdong leads series, 1-0

Zhuji Jiyang College Gymnasium, Zhuji

29 April 2021
19:35

Boxscore

Liaoning Flying Leopards	102–98 (OT)	Guangdong Southern Tigers
Scoring by quarter: 23–32, 20–17, 26–16, 19–23, Overtime: 14–10
Series tied, 1-1

Zhuji Jiyang College Gymnasium, Zhuji

1 May 2021
19:35

Boxscore

Guangdong Southern Tigers	110–103 (OT)	Liaoning Flying Leopards
Scoring by quarter: 20–19, 34–25, 27–24, 18–31, Overtime: 11–4
Guangdong wins series, 2-1

Zhuji Jiyang College Gymnasium, Zhuji

== Final standings ==
Rank	Team
1	Guangdong Southern Tigers
2	Liaoning Flying Leopards
3	Zhejiang Golden Bulls
4	Shandong Heroes
5	Xinjiang Flying Tigers
6	Qingdao Eagles
7	Zhejiang Lions
8	Beijing Ducks
9	Shenzhen Aviators
10	Jilin Northeast Tigers
11	Sichuan Blue Whales
12	Guangzhou Loong Lions
13	Beijing Royal Fighters
14	Shanghai Sharks
15	Shanxi Loongs
16	Fujian Sturgeons
17	Tianjin Pioneers
18	Nanjing Monkey Kings
19	Jiangsu Dragons

== All-Star Weekend ==
=== Rising Stars Challenge ===
North
Pos.	Player	Team
SG	Chen Peidong	Shandong Heroes
SF	He Siyu	Tianjin Pioneers
SG/PG	Hong Zhonghua	Qingdao Eagles
SG	Lin Tingqian	Tianjin Pioneers
PG/SG	Lin Weihan	Qingdao Eagles
SG	Liu Yi	Shandong Heroes
PF/C	Lutubula	Xinjiang Flying Tigers
SF	Qi Lin	Xinjiang Flying Tigers
PF/C	Wang Shaojie	Beijing Royal Fighters
PF/C	Wu Changze	Liaoning Flying Leopards
SF/PG	Zhang Ning	Shanxi Loongs
SF/PF	Zhang Zhenlin	Liaoning Flying Leopards
Head coach: Wang Han (Jilin Northeast Tigers)

South
Pos.	Player	Team
PF/C	Jiang Haoran	Jiangsu Dragons
SF	Lu Pengyu	Shenzhen Aviators
C/PF	Ou Junxuan	Shanghai Sharks
PG/SG	Tang Jie	Fujian Sturgeons
PG/SG	Yang Haozhe	Nanjing Monkey Kings
PG	Yuan Tangwen	Sichuan Blue Whales
PF/SF	Zhang Hao	Guangdong Southern Tigers
PF	Zhao Jiaren	Zhejiang Lions
C	Zhao Yiming^{REP1}	Shenzhen Aviators
PF	Zheng Qilong^{INJ1}	Jiangsu Dragons
SF	Zhu Junlong	Zhejiang Lions
SF	Zhu Mingzhen	Guangzhou Loong Lions
SF	Zhu Songwei	Sichuan Blue Whales
Head coach: Wang Bo (Zhejiang Lions)

^INJ1 Zheng Qilong was unable to participate due to injury. ^REP1 Zhao Yiming was selected as Zheng Qilong's replacement.

20 March 2021
19:10

Boxscore

North 103, South 106
Scoring by quarter: 24–22, 21–20, 35–24, 18–25
Pts: Zhang Zhenlin 24; Rebs: Wang Shaojie 15; Asts: Lin Weihan, Zhang Zhenlin 4	Pts: Zhu Songwei 16; Rebs: Yuan Tangwen, Zhu Songwei 8 Asts: Yuan Tangwen 18

Conson Gymnasium, Qingdao
Referees:
- #67 Yang Peng
- #80 Yu Wei
- #54 Song Houlu

=== Skills Challenge ===
Contestants
Pos.	Player	Team
SG	Chen Peidong	Shandong Heroes
PG	Feng Xin	Zhejiang Lions
PG/SG	Jia Mingru	Guangzhou Loong Lions
SF	Jiang Yuxing	Jilin Northeast Tigers
SG	Lin Tingqian	Tianjin Pioneers
C/PF	Ou Junxuan	Shanghai Sharks
PF/C	Wang Shaojie	Beijing Royal Fighters
PG/SG	Wu Yongsheng	Xinjiang Flying Tigers
PG	Yang Ali	Beijing Ducks
PG/SG	Yang Haozhe	Nanjing Monkey Kings
SF/PG	Zhang Ning	Shanxi Loongs
SG	Zhao Yanhao	Zhejiang Lions

First round
Wu Yongsheng	O
Lin Tingqian	X
Jiang Yuxing	X
Yang Haozhe	O
Feng Xin	O
Jia Mingru	X
Wang Shaojie	X
Ou Junxuan	O

Quarterfinals
Chen Peidong	X
Wu Yongsheng	O
Yang Haozhe	X
Zhang Ning	O
Yang Ali	X
Feng Xin	O
Ou Junxuan	X
Zhao Yanhao	O

Semifinals
Wu Yongsheng	O
Zhang Ning	X
Feng Xin	O
Zhao Yanhao	X

Final
Wu Yongsheng	O
Feng Xin	X

=== Three-Point Contest ===
Contestants
Pos.	Player	Team	First round	Final round
PG/SG	Hu Mingxuan	Guangdong Southern Tigers	22	23
SG/PG	Zhang Fan	Beijing Royal Fighters	21	19
SF/SG	Chen Linjian	Fujian Sturgeons	16	15
PF	Dai Huaibo	Jilin Northeast Tigers	15	DNQ
PF/SF	Du Runwang	Guangdong Southern Tigers	15	DNQ
SF	Zhu Songwei	Sichuan Blue Whales	15	DNQ
SF/SG	Cong Mingchen	Liaoning Flying Leopards	13	DNQ
	Zhao Chenkai	Wildcard Amateur Player	13	DNQ
PG/SG	Zhao Jiwei	Liaoning Flying Leopards	9	DNQ

=== Slam Dunk Contest ===
Contestants
Pos.	Player	Team	First round	Final round
SF/PF	Zhang Zhenlin	Liaoning Flying Leopards	100 (50+50)	99
	Chen Dengxing	Wildcard Amateur Player	89 (50+39)	98
SF	Lu Pengyu	Shenzhen Aviators	89 (46+43)	82
PF/SF	Zhang Hao^{REP1}	Guangdong Southern Tigers	83 (41+42)	DNQ
PG/SG	Tang Jie	Fujian Sturgeons	78 (43+35)	DNQ
SF/PF	Zhang Yang	Qingdao Eagles	75 (39+36)	DNQ
PF	Zheng Qilong^{INJ1}	Jiangsu Dragons	DNP	DNP

^INJ1 Zheng Qilong was unable to participate due to injury. ^REP1 Zhang Hao was selected as Zheng Qilong's replacement.

=== All-Star Game ===
North All-Stars
Pos	Player	Team
Starters
G	Guo Ailun	Liaoning Flying Leopards
G	Zhao Jiwei	Liaoning Flying Leopards
F	Zhang Zhenlin	Liaoning Flying Leopards
F	Zhou Qi	Xinjiang Flying Tigers
C	Han Dejun	Liaoning Flying Leopards
Reserves
G	Jiang Yuxing	Jilin Northeast Tigers
G	Gao Shiyan	Shandong Heroes
F	Zhai Xiaochuan^{INJ1}	Beijing Ducks
F	Qi Lin	Xinjiang Flying Tigers
F	Wang Shaojie^{REP1}	Beijing Royal Fighters
F	Yu Changdong	Beijing Royal Fighters
C	Tao Hanlin	Shandong Heroes
C	Liu Chuanxing	Qingdao Eagles
Head coach: Yang Ming (Liaoning Flying Leopards)

South All-Stars
Pos	Player	Team
Starters
G	Zhao Rui	Guangdong Southern Tigers
G	Hu Mingxuan	Guangdong Southern Tigers
F	Zhou Peng	Guangdong Southern Tigers
F	Ren Junfei	Guangdong Southern Tigers
C	Shen Zijie	Shenzhen Aviators
Reserves
G	Wu Qian	Zhejiang Golden Bulls
G	Sun Minghui	Zhejiang Lions
G	Shirelijan Muxtar	Nanjing Monkey Kings
F	Sonny Weems	Guangdong Southern Tigers
C	Wu Guanxi	Jiangsu Dragons
C	Wang Zhelin	Fujian Sturgeons
C	Hu Jinqiu	Zhejiang Lions
Head coach: Du Feng (Guangdong Southern Tigers)

^INJ1 Zhai Xiaochuan was unable to participate due to injury. ^REP1 Wang Shaojie was selected as Zhai Xiaochuan's replacement.

21 March 2021
19:00

Boxscore

North 109, South 123
Scoring by quarter: 26–20, 29–31, 33–40, 21–32
Pts: Zhao Jiwei 20; Rebs: Liu Chuanxing 8 Asts: Zhao Jiwei 8	Pts: Wu Qian 23; Rebs: Hu Jinqiu, Shen Zijie 8 Asts: Hu Mingxuan 9

Conson Gymnasium, Qingdao

== Awards ==
=== Yearly awards ===
This is a list of the 2020–21 CBA season's yearly awards winners.

Award	Recipient(s)	Runner(s)-up/Finalists	Ref.
Domestic Most Valuable Player	(China) Wu Qian (Zhejiang Golden Bulls)		
Foreign Most Valuable Player	(United States) MarShon Brooks (Guangdong Southern Tigers)		
Defensive Player of the Year	(China) Zhou Peng (Guangdong Southern Tigers)		
Sixth Man of the Year	(China) Hu Mingxuan (Guangdong Southern Tigers)		
Most Improved Player	(China) Gao Shiyan (Shandong Heroes)		
Young Rising Star of the Year	(China) Zhang Zhenlin (Liaoning Flying Leopards)		
Coach of the Year	(China) Du Feng (Guangdong Southern Tigers)		

- All-CBA Domestic First Team:
  - F Hu Jinqiu, Zhejiang Lions
  - F Shen Zijie, Shenzhen Aviators
  - C Zhou Qi, Xinjiang Flying Tigers
  - G Wu Qian, Zhejiang Golden Bulls
  - G Zhao Jiwei, Liaoning Flying Leopards
- All-CBA Domestic Second Team:
  - F Zhou Peng, Guangdong Southern Tigers
  - F Zhang Zhenlin, Liaoning Flying Leopards
  - C Han Dejun, Liaoning Flying Leopards
  - G Guo Ailun, Liaoning Flying Leopards
  - G Zhao Rui, Guangdong Southern Tigers
- All-CBA Foreign First Team:
  - F (United States) Dakari Johnson, Qingdao Eagles
  - F (Lithuania) Donatas Motiejūnas, Xinjiang Flying Tigers
  - C (Iran) Hamed Haddadi, Sichuan Blue Whales
  - G (United States) Lester Hudson, Shandong Heroes
  - G (United States) MarShon Brooks, Guangdong Southern Tigers

=== Players of the Week ===
This is a list of the 2020–21 CBA season's Player of the Week award winners.

Week	Domestic Player of the Week	International Player of the Week	Ref.
1	(China) Sun Minghui (Zhejiang Lions) (1/2)	Vacant	
2	(China) Jiang Yuxing (Jilin Northeast Tigers) (1/1)	(United States) Dallas Moore (Guangzhou Loong Lions) (1/1)	
3	(China) Guo Ailun (Liaoning Flying Leopards) (1/1)	(United States) Manny Harris (Shandong Heroes) (1/1)	
4	(China) Sun Minghui (Zhejiang Lions) (2/2)	(United States) Jamaal Franklin (Shanxi Loongs) (1/1)	
5	(China) Gao Shiyan (Shandong Heroes) (1/1)	(United States) MarShon Brooks (Guangdong Southern Tigers) (1/2)	
6	(China) Qi Lin (Xinjiang Flying Tigers) (1/1)	(United States) MarShon Brooks (Guangdong Southern Tigers) (2/2)	
7	(China) Zhu Xuhang (Zhejiang Golden Bulls) (1/1)	(United States) Dominique Jones (Jilin Northeast Tigers) (1/3)	
8	(China) Yang Linyi (Shenzhen Aviators) (1/1)	(United States) Dominique Jones (Jilin Northeast Tigers) (2/3)	
9	(China) Zhao Yanhao (Zhejiang Lions) (1/2)	(United States) Dominique Jones (Jilin Northeast Tigers) (3/3)	
10	(China) Zhao Yanhao (Zhejiang Lions) (2/2)	(Iran) Hamed Haddadi (Sichuan Blue Whales) (1/1)	
11	(China) Feng Xin (Zhejiang Lions) (1/1)	(United States) Askia Booker (Shenzhen Aviators) (1/1)	
12	(China) Zhou Peng (Guangdong Southern Tigers) (1/1)	(United States) Marcus Georges-Hunt (Sichuan Blue Whales) (1/1)	

=== Players of the Month ===
This is a list of the 2020–21 CBA season's Player of the Month award winners.

Month	Player of the Month	Ref.
1	(China) Guo Ailun (Liaoning Flying Leopards) (1/1)	
2	(China) Zhao Jiwei (Liaoning Flying Leopards) (1/1)	
3	(China) Hu Jinqiu (Zhejiang Lions) (1/1)	

=== Young Players of the Month ===
This is a list of the 2020–21 CBA season's Young Player of the Month award winners.

Month	Player of the Month	Ref.
1	(China) Zhu Songwei (Sichuan Blue Whales) (1/1)	
2	(China) Qi Lin (Xinjiang Flying Tigers) (1/1)	
3	(China) Zhang Zhenlin (Liaoning Flying Leopards) (1/1)	
