= 2019–20 Chinese Basketball Association season =

CBA
- Season: 2019–20
- Duration: 1 November 2019–21 January 2020; 20 June–27 July 2020 (Regular season); 31 July–15 August 2020 (Playoffs)
- Games played: 46
- Teams: 20

Regular season
- Top seed: Guangdong Southern Tigers

Finals
- Champions: Guangdong Southern Tigers
- Runners-up: Liaoning Flying Leopards
- Semifinalists: Beijing Ducks; Xinjiang Flying Tigers

The 2019–20 CBA season was the 25th season of the Chinese Basketball Association (CBA). The regular season began on 1 November 2019 with the Guangdong Southern Tigers hosting the Liaoning Flying Leopards.

The CBA regular season was suspended since 1 February 2020 due to the coronavirus pandemic. The season was resumed on 20 June 2020. The regular season was concluded on 27 July 2020. The playoffs started on 31 July 2020 and concluded on 15 August 2020.

== Team changes ==
=== Name changes ===
The CBA changed the name of the following five teams as a part of an ongoing plan.

- Beikong Fly Dragons changed their name to Beijing Royal Fighters in May 2019.
- Guangzhou Long-Lions changed their name to Guangzhou Loong Lions in May 2019.
- Shandong Golden Stars changed their name to Shandong Heroes in May 2019.
- Shenzhen Leopards changed their name to Shenzhen Aviators in May 2019.
- Tianjin Gold Lions changed their name to Tianjin Pioneers in May 2019.

== Venues ==
Listed below are the home arenas for the 2019–20 CBA season.

Note: Venues in italics denote the ones will be used from 20 June 2020 to the end of the season.

Team	Home city	Arena	Capacity
Bayi Rockets	Nanchang	Nanchang International Sports Center Gymnasium	11,000
Beijing Ducks	Beijing	Cadillac Arena	18,000
Beikong Royal Fighters	Beijing	Olympic Sports Center Gymnasium	6,300
Fujian Sturgeons	Jinjiang	Zuchang Gymnasium	6,000
Guangdong Southern Tigers	Dongguan	Nissan Sports Centre	14,730
Guangzhou Loong-Lions	Guangzhou	Tianhe Gymnasium	8,628
Jiangsu Dragons	Suzhou	Suzhou Sports Center Gymnasium	6000
Jilin Northeast Tigers	Changchun	Changchun Gymnasium	4,150
Liaoning Flying Leopards	Shenyang	Liaoning Gymnasium	12,000
Nanjing Monkey Kings	Nanjing	Nanjing Youth Olympic Sports Park	22,000
Qingdao Eagles	Qingdao	Guoxin Gymnasium	12,500
Shandong Heroes	Jinan	Shandong Arena	8,800
Shanghai Sharks	Shanghai	Pudong Yuanshen Gymnasium	5,000
Shanxi Loongs	Taiyuan	Shanxi Sports Centre Gymnasium	8,000
Shenzhen Aviators	Shenzhen	Shenzhen Dayun Arena	18,000
Sichuan Blue Whales	Chengdu	Sichuan Provincial Gymnasium	9,200
Tianjin Pioneers	Tianjin	Dongli Gymnasium	3,000
Xinjiang Flying Tigers	Ürümqi	Hongshan Arena	3,800
Zhejiang Golden Bulls	Hangzhou	Binjiang Gymnasium	6,000
Zhejiang Guangsha Lions	Zhuji	Zhuji Sports Centre Gymnasium	5,136

== Head coaches ==
Listed below are the head coaches for the 2019–20 CBA season.

Team	Head Coach	Replaced During Season
Bayi Rockets	(China) Wang Zhizhi	
Beijing Ducks	(Greece) Yannis Christopoulos	
Beikong Royal Fighters	(United States) Stephon Marbury	
Fujian Sturgeons	(Serbia) Aleksandar Kesar	(China) Zhu Shilong
Guangdong Southern Tigers	(China) Du Feng	
Guangzhou Loong-Lions	(Spain) Juan Antonio Orenga	
Jiangsu Dragons	(Slovenia) Memi Becirovic	
Jilin Northeast Tigers	(China) Wang Han	
Liaoning Flying Leopards	(China) Guo Shiqiang	(Spain) Alejandro Martínez
Nanjing Monkey Kings	(China) Cui Wanjun	
Qingdao Eagles	(China) Wu Qinglong	
Shandong Heroes	(China) Gong Xiaobin	
Shanghai Sharks	(China) Li Qiuping	
Shanxi Loongs	(China) Wang Fei	
Shenzhen Aviators	(China) Wang Jianjun	
Sichuan Blue Whales	(China) Zhou Jinli	(China) Ying Kui
Tianjin Pioneers	(China) Liu Tie	(Spain) Manolo Hussein
Xinjiang Flying Tigers	(China) Adiljan Suleyman	
Zhejiang Golden Bulls	(China) Liu Weiwei	
Zhejiang Guangsha Lions	(China) Li Chunjiang	

== Draft ==
The 2019 CBA Draft, the fifth edition of the CBA draft, took place on 29 July 2019 in Shanghai. 16 players were selected in the draft.

Rnd.	Pick	Player	Nationality (Note: Nationality indicates the player's national team or representative nationality. If a player has not competed at the international level, then the nationality indicates the national team which the player is eligible to represent according to FIBA rules.)	Team	School / club team
1	1	Wang Shaojie	China	Beijing Royal Fighters	Peking University
1	2	Sun Siyao	China	Nanjing Monkey Kings	California State University, Northridge (US NCAA)
1	3	Yuan Tangwen	China	Sichuan Blue Whales	Xiamen University
1	4	Guan Jian	China	Tianjin Pioneers	Shanghai Sharks Youth
1	5	Lin Wei-han	Chinese Taipei	Qingdao Eagles	Yulon Luxgen Dinos (SBL)
1	8	Wu Yong-sheng	Chinese Taipei	Shanghai Sharks	Formosa Dreamers (SBL)
1	9	Liu Yuchen	China	Zhejiang Golden Bulls	Peking University
1	11	Wang Wenyu	China	Shandong Heroes	Shandong Heroes Youth
1	13	Tang Jie	China	Fujian Sturgeons	Wuhan Dangdai (NBL)
1	18	Liu Lipeng	China	Xinjiang Flying Tigers	Xinjiang Flying Tigers Youth
2	1	Meng Bolong	China	Beijing Royal Fighters	Beijing University of Technology
2	2	Li Shengdong	China	Nanjing Monkey Kings	Anhui Jiangzhun (NBL)
2	4	He Siyu	China	Tianjin Pioneers	Shanxi University
2	5	Wang Ruize	China	Qingdao Eagles	Nanchang University
2	11	Ma Guanghan	China	Shandong Heroes	Anhui Wenyi (NBL)
2	18	Yang Sheng-yan	Chinese Taipei	Xinjiang Flying Tigers	Free Agent

== Foreign players policy ==
All teams except the Bayi Rockets (a club owned by the People's Liberation Army) can have two foreign players. The bottom two teams from the previous season (except Bayi) have the additional right to sign an extra Asian player.

=== Rules chart ===
The rules for using foreign players in each game are described in this chart:

#	Facing other teams	Facing Bayi Rockets
Chinese players+	No Limit	No Limit
Asian players++	No Limit	4 quarters collectively+++
International players	6 quarters collectively+++	4 quarters collectively+++

+ Including players from Hong Kong and Taiwan.

++ If a team waives its right to sign an extra Asian player, it may use its 2 foreign players for 7 quarters collectively.

+++ Only 1 allowed in the 4th quarter.

=== Import chart ===
This is the full list of international players competing in the CBA during the 2019–20 season. One major change is that many teams began to actively sign "reserve" imports this season to provide insurance for injuries. Players who sign contracts but are not actually playing will be listed under the heading of "Inactive Or Replaced" during the 2019–20 season. Those who never actually play in games before the end of the season will have their names removed from this list when the season ends.

Team	Player 1	Player 2	Asian Player	Inactive Or Replaced
Bayi Rockets	–	–	-	–
Beijing Ducks	(United States) (Chinese Taipei) Jeremy Lin	(United States) (Nigeria) Ekpe Udoh	N/A	(United States) (Croatia) Justin Hamilton
Beikong Royal Fighters	(United States) Kyle Fogg	(United States) Jason Thompson	(Palestine) Sani Sakakini	-
Fujian Sturgeons	(United States) (Ukraine) Pooh Jeter	(United States) Dante Cunningham	N/A	(United States) Ty Lawson (United States) Erick Green
Guangdong Southern Tigers	(United States) MarShon Brooks	(United States) Sonny Weems	N/A	-
Guangzhou Loong-Lions	(United States) Andrew Nicholson	-	N/A	(United States) Marcus Georges-Hunt (Canada) Keifer Sykes
Jiangsu Dragons	(United States) Jonathan Gibson	(Serbia) Miroslav Raduljica	N/A	(United States) Antonio Blakeney
Jilin Northeast Tigers	(United States) Dominique Jones	(United States) Eli Holman	N/A	-
Liaoning Flying Leopards	(United States) Lance Stephenson	(United States) Brandon Bass	N/A	-
Nanjing Monkey Kings	(United States) Joe Young	(France) Guerschon Yabusele	(Iran) Hamed Haddadi	(Iran) Behnam Yakhchali
Qingdao Eagles	(United States) (Bulgaria) Darius Adams	(United States) Dakari Johnson	N/A	(United States) Kenny Boynton (DNP YET)
Shandong Heroes	(United States) Lester Hudson	(United States) (Central African Republic) James Mays	N/A	-
Shanghai Sharks	(United States) Ray McCallum Jr.	(Lithuania) Donatas Motiejunas	N/A	(United States) James Nunnally
Shanxi Loongs	(United States) Jamaal Franklin	(United States) Eric Moreland	N/A	(United States) Malcolm Thomas
Shenzhen Aviators	(United States) Dwight Buycks	(United States) Jarell Martin	N/A	(United States) Shabazz Muhammad (United States) Pierre Jackson
Sichuan Blue Whales	(United States) Courtney Fortson	(United States) Tyler Hansbrough	N/A	(United States) Thomas Robinson
Tianjin Pioneers	(United States) Chasson Randle	(Montenegro) Marko Todorovic	N/A	-
Xinjiang Flying Tigers	(United States) Kay Felder	(United States) Eric Mika	N/A	(United States) Jarnell Stokes (United States) Ian Clark (DNP YET)
Zhejiang Golden Bulls	(United States) Marcus Denmon	(United States) (Austria) Sylven Landesberg	N/A	-
Zhejiang Guangsha Lions	(United States) Dez Wells	(United States) Miles Plumlee	N/A	(United States) Kenneth Faried

== Regular Season Standings ==
#	2019–20 CBA regular season				
#	Team	W	L	Pct.	Tiebreaker
1	Guangdong Southern Tigers	44	2	.957	
2	Xinjiang Flying Tigers	36	10	.783	
3	Liaoning Flying Leopards	32	14	.696	
4	Beijing Ducks	32	14	.696	
5	Zhejiang Lions	30	16	.652	
6	Zhejiang Golden Bulls	30	16	.652	
7	Beijing Royal Fighters	29	17	.630	
8	Qingdao Eagles	25	21	.543	
9	Shandong Heroes	24	22	.522	
10	Jilin Northeast Tigers	24	22	.522	
11	Shanxi Loongs	24	22	.522	
12	Fujian Sturgeons	24	22	.522	
13	Shenzhen Aviators	20	26	.435	
14	Nanjing Monkey Kings	18	28	.391	
15	Jiangsu Dragons	17	29	.370	
16	Shanghai Sharks	16	30	.348	
17	Sichuan Blue Whales	11	35	.239	
18	Guangzhou Loong Lions	10	36	.217	
19	Tianjin Pioneers	8	38	.174	
20	Bayi Rockets	6	40	.130	

Key to colors
Top 4 teams advance directly to Quarter-finals of CBA Playoffs
5th-12th place teams progress to First Round of CBA Playoffs

== Playoffs ==
Because of the format change due to the COVID-19 pandemic, the Playoffs in this season will be shortened - the first two rounds will be played as one-off matches, and the last two rounds will be played in best-of-three games.

First round One-off
8	Qingdao Eagles	1
9	Shandong Heroes	0
5	Zhejiang Lions	0
12	Fujian Sturgeons	1
6	Zhejiang Golden Bulls	1
11	Shanxi Loongs	0
7	Beijing Royal Fighters	1
10	Jilin Northeast Tigers	0

Quarter-finals; One-off
1	Guangdong Southern Tigers	1
8	Qingdao Eagles	0
4	Beijing Ducks	1
12	Fujian Sturgeons	0
3	Liaoning Flying Leopards	1
6	Zhejiang Golden Bulls	0
2	Xinjiang Flying Tigers	1
7	Beijing Royal Fighters	0

Semi-finals; Best-of-three
1	Guangdong Southern Tigers	2
4	Beijing Ducks	1
3	Liaoning Flying Leopards	2
2	Xinjiang Flying Tigers	0

Finals; Best-of-three
1	Guangdong Southern Tigers	2
3	Liaoning Flying Leopards	1

- Bold Series winner

=== First round ===
==== (5) Zhejiang Lions vs. (12) Fujian Sturgeons ====
31 July 2020
15:00

Boxscore

Zhejiang Lions	119–132	Fujian Sturgeons
Scoring by quarter: 34–34, 27–34, 31–31, 27–33

Qingdao Guoxin Gymnasium, Qingdao
Referees: Liang Bin, Yang Xiaoguang, Li Chengxin

==== (6) Zhejiang Golden Bulls vs. (11) Shanxi Loongs ====
1 August 2020
15:00

Boxscore

Zhejiang Golden Bulls	91–82	Shanxi Loongs
Scoring by quarter: 22–18, 28–23, 27–25, 14–16

Qingdao Guoxin Gymnasium, Qingdao
Referees: Xia Chun, Yang Hongfeng, Zhang Lei

==== (7) Beijing Royal Fighters vs. (10) Jilin Northeast Tigers ====
1 August 2020
20:00

Boxscore

Beijing Royal Fighters	108–106	Jilin Northeast Tigers
Scoring by quarter: 27–29, 24–29, 26–17, 31–31

Qingdao Guoxin Gymnasium, Qingdao
Referees: Cui Zhexiong, Ye Nan, Wei Guoliang

==== (8) Qingdao Eagles vs. (9) Shandong Heroes ====
31 July 2020
20:00

Boxscore

Qingdao Eagles	129–120	Shandong Heroes
Scoring by quarter: 28–30, 33–20, 30–36, 38–34

Qingdao Guoxin Gymnasium, Qingdao
Referees: Song Xiaojing, Yan Jun, Han Xu

=== Quarter-finals ===
==== (1) Guangdong Southern Tigers vs. (8) Qingdao Eagles ====
2 August 2020
15:00

Boxscore

Guangdong Southern Tigers	110–88	Qingdao Eagles
Scoring by quarter: 28–14, 22–19, 28–24, 32–31

Qingdao Guoxin Gymnasium, Qingdao
Referees: Yan Jun, Xin Genwei, Guo Nan

==== (2) Xinjiang Flying Tigers vs. (7) Beijing Royal Fighters ====
3 August 2020
15:00

Boxscore

Xinjiang Flying Tigers	103–91	Beijing Royal Fighters
Scoring by quarter: 25–24, 22–21, 31–24, 25–22

Qingdao Guoxin Gymnasium, Qingdao
Referees: Xia Chun, Yan Jun, Hu Ji

==== (3) Liaoning Flying Leopards vs. (6) Zhejiang Golden Bulls ====
3 August 2020
20:00

Boxscore

Liaoning Flying Leopards	127–123	Zhejiang Golden Bulls
Scoring by quarter: 30–32, 34–34, 32–29, 31–28

Qingdao Guoxin Gymnasium, Qingdao
Referees: Liang Bin, Ye Nan, Yang Xiaoguang

==== (4) Beijing Ducks vs. (12) Fujian Sturgeons ====
2 August 2020
20:00

Boxscore

Beijing Ducks	107–75	Fujian Sturgeons
Scoring by quarter: 30–15, 32–13, 26–27, 19–20

Qingdao Guoxin Gymnasium, Qingdao
Referees: Xia Chun, Liang Bin, Ye Nan

=== Semi-finals ===
==== (1) Guangdong Southern Tigers vs. (4) Beijing Ducks ====
4 August 2020
20:00

Boxscore

Guangdong Southern Tigers	111–109 (OT)	Beijing Ducks
Scoring by quarter: 27–26, 21–33, 19–24, 37–21, Overtime: 7–5
Guangdong leads series, 1-0

Qingdao Guoxin Gymnasium, Qingdao
Referees: Liang Bin, Ye Nan, Jiang Zhiyuan

6 August 2020
20:00

Boxscore

Beijing Ducks	90–86	Guangdong Southern Tigers
Scoring by quarter: 14–18, 28–27, 23–23, 25–18
Series tied, 1-1

Qingdao Guoxin Gymnasium, Qingdao
Referees: Xia Chun, Song Xiaojing, Cui Zhexiong

8 August 2020
20:00

Boxscore

Guangdong Southern Tigers	88–85	Beijing Ducks
Scoring by quarter: 16–13, 21–24, 26–20, 25–28
Guangdong wins series, 2-1

Qingdao Guoxin Gymnasium, Qingdao
Referees: Xia Chun, Song Xiaojing, Li Chengxin

==== (2) Xinjiang Flying Tigers vs. (3) Liaoning Flying Leopards ====
5 August 2020
20:00

Boxscore

Xinjiang Flying Tigers	88–116	Liaoning Flying Leopards
Scoring by quarter: 24–34, 24–25, 20–36, 20–21
Liaoning leads series, 1–0

Qingdao Guoxin Gymnasium, Qingdao
Referees: Duan Zhu, Yan Jun, Ye Nan

7 August 2020
20:00

Boxscore

Liaoning Flying Leopards	119–113	Xinjiang Flying Tigers
Scoring by quarter: 22–33, 40–22, 29–34, 28–24
Liaoning wins series, 2–0

Qingdao Guoxin Gymnasium, Qingdao
Referees: Yan Jun, Duan Zhu, Guo Nan

=== Finals ===
==== (1) Guangdong Southern Tigers vs. (3) Liaoning Flying Leopards ====
11 August 2020
20:00

Boxscore

Guangdong Southern Tigers	110–88	Liaoning Flying Leopards
Scoring by quarter: 25–24, 30–26, 25–23, 30–15
Guangdong leads series, 1–0

Qingdao Guoxin Gymnasium, Qingdao
Referees: Yan Jun, Duan Zhu, Ye Nan

13 August 2020
20:00

Boxscore

Liaoning Flying Leopards	115–113	Guangdong Southern Tigers
Scoring by quarter: 34–38, 24–28, 23–27, 34–20
Series tied, 1–1

Qingdao Guoxin Gymnasium, Qingdao
Referees: Xia Chun, Liang Bin, Yang Hongfeng

15 August 2020
20:00

Boxscore

Guangdong Southern Tigers	123–115	Liaoning Flying Leopards
Scoring by quarter: 26–29, 28–18, 41–39, 28–29
Guangdong wins series, 2–1

Qingdao Guoxin Gymnasium, Qingdao
Referees: Duan Zhu, Yan Jun, Ye Nan

== Statistics ==
Listed below are the 2019–20 CBA season's final individual and team statistical leaders. The CBA is like the NCAA, and unlike the NBA, in the practice of combining regular season statistics with playoff statistics.

=== Statistical leaders – individual ===
More info needed

== Awards ==
Listed below are the 2019–20 CBA season's weekly, monthly, and annual awards.

=== Yearly awards ===
This is a list of the 2019–20 CBA season's yearly awards winners.

Award	Recipient(s)	Runner(s)-up/Finalists	Ref.
Domestic Most Valuable Player	(China) Yi Jianlian (Guangdong Southern Tigers)	(China) Han Dejun (Liaoning Flying Leopards) (China) Hu Jinqiu (Zhejiang Guangsha Lions) (China) Wang Zhelin (Fujian Sturgeons) (China) Zhou Qi (Xinjiang Flying Tigers)	
Defensive Player of the Year	(China) Zhou Qi (Xinjiang Flying Tigers)	(United States) Jeremy Lin (Beijing Ducks) (United States) Sonny Weems (Guangdong Southern Tigers) (China) Yi Jianlian (Guangdong Southern Tigers) (China) Zhai Xiaochuan (Beijing Ducks)	
Sixth Man of the Year	(China) Fang Shuo (Beijing Ducks)	(China) Dai Huaibo (Jilin Northeast Tigers) (China) Lai Junhao (Zhejiang Golden Bulls) (China) Yu Changdong (Xinjiang Flying Tigers) (China) Zeng Lingxu (Xinjiang Flying Tigers)	
Most Improved Player	(China) Sun Minghui (Zhejiang Lions)	(China) Hu Mingxuan (Guangdong Southern Tigers) (China) Yuan Shuai (Shanxi Loongs)	
Young Rising Star of the Year	(China) Hu Mingxuan (Guangdong Southern Tigers)	(Chinese Taipei) Chen Ying-chun (Guangzhou Looog Lions) (China) Cheng Shuaipeng (Zhejiang Golden Bulls) (China) Wang Shaojie (Beijing Royal Fighters)	
Coach of the Year	(China) Du Feng (Guangdong Southern Tigers)	(China) Adiljan Jun (Xinjiang Flying Tigers) (Spain) Alejandro Martinez (Liaoning Flying Leopards) (China) Xie Libin (Beijing Ducks)	

- All-CBA First Team:
  - F Hu Jinqiu, Zhejiang Lions
  - F Zhai Xiaochuan, Beijing Ducks
  - C Yi Jianlian, Guangdong Southern Tigers
  - G Wu Qian, Zhejiang Golden Bulls
  - G Sun Minghui, Zhejiang Lions
- All-CBA Second Team:
  - F Ren Junfei, Guangdong Southern Tigers
  - F Jiang Yuxing, Jilin Northeast Tigers
  - C Zhou Qi, Xinjiang Flying Tigers
  - G Zhao Jiwei, Liaoning Flying Leopards
  - G Zhao Rui, Guangdong Southern Tigers

=== Players of the Week ===
This is a list of the 2019–20 CBA season's Player of the Week award winners.

=== Players of the Month ===
This is a list of the 2019–20 CBA season's Player of the Month award winners.

=== Young Rising Stars of the Month ===
This is a list of the 2019–20 CBA season's Young Rising Star of the Month award winners.

== All-Star Weekend ==
The 25th CBA All-Star Game and associated events were held in January 2020. Saturday features the Rising Stars Challenge, in which a team of CBA Rookies & Sophomores face a squad of students from the Chinese University Basketball Association, as well as the preliminaries of the Slam Dunk Contest, Three-Point Shootout, and Skills Competition. Sunday features the All-Star Game, with the South hosting the North, and the finals of the three individual events taking place at halftime.
