= Kyranbek Makhan =

Chinese basketball player (born 1992)

Kyranbek Makhan 可兰白克·马坎
Personal information
- Born: 27 September 1992 (age 34) Artux, Xinjiang, China
- Listed height: 6 ft 6 in (1.98 m)

Career information
- Playing career: 2008–2023
- Position: Small forward / shooting guard

Career history
- 2008–2020: Xinjiang Flying Tigers
- 2020–2022: Shanghai Sharks
- 2022–2023: Shandong Hi-Speed Kirin
Medals
Men's basketball
Representing China
East Asian Games
Silver medal – second place	2013 Tianjin

Kyranbek Makhan
Other names
- Alternative spelling: Kyranbek Makhan; Kelanbaike Makan

Kyranbek Makhan (born September 27, 1992) is a Chinese former basketball player of Kyrgyz origin who played in the small forward position for China. He is an elite three point shooter and perimeter defender. Kyranbek played with the Xinjiang Flying Tigers for 11 years and was an important part of their three consecutive Grand Finals from 2009 to 2011 and their first championship in the 2016–17 season. He is widely regarded as one of the most iconic players of the Xinjiang Flying Tigers, along with Shirelijan Muxtar and Xu Guochong. He was part of the Chinese squad for the 2019 FIBA Basketball World Cup.

== Career ==
Kyranbek was promoted to the first team of Xinjiang Flying Tigers and debuted in Chinese Basketball Association in the 2008–09 season. He was an important part of the team's three consecutive trips to the Grand Finals in the 2008-09, 2009–10, and 2010–11 seasons, serving as an elite perimeter defender for the team. Through the seasons, he also became an elite three point shooter.

In the 2016–17 season, Kyranbek started 40 of the 50 regular season games he played, averaging 24.1 minutes, 8.1 points, and 2.6 rebounds per game. He played an important role in the first CBA championship for the Xinjiang Flying Tigers franchise. Notably, his stats were on par with the regular season MVP Ding Yanyuhang during their direct face-off in the small forward position in the Quarter-Finals.

After the 2019–20 season, Kyranbek was traded by Xinjiang Flying Tigers for 8 million CNY to Shanghai Sharks and signed a 3+1 regular (type-C) contract with the latter team, with the last year being a team option. His salary averages 7.5 million CNY (1.1 million USD) a year, the max value for non-max contracts.

In 2023, Kyranbek retired from professional basketball.

== Name ==
Kyranbek Makan is a Kyrgyz person born in Xinjiang, China. There are several alternative spellings to his name. Kyranbek is the direct transliteration of his first name from his native Kyrgyz language. Alternatively, some sources indirectly transliterated his name via Mandarin Chinese (可兰白克) as Kelanbaike. His patronym's direct translation from Kyrgyz is Makhan. The indirect transliteration via Mandarin (马坎) is Makan. Therefore, alternative spellings of his full name include:

- Kyranbek Makhan, and
- Kelanbaike Makan.

Some sources might incorrectly mingle these two as Kyranbek Makan or Kelanbaike Makhan. Notebly, some sources rendered his first name as Korambek. This form is not an alternative spelling, but simply wrong since it has no traceable route of indirect transliteration.

As a Kyrgyz name, Kyranbek Makhan uses the patronymic system and consists of the given (first) name Kyranbek and the patronym (father's name) Makhan. Therefore, Makhan is the name of Kyranbek's late father. In general, it is not acceptable to refer to him using only Makhan, even in a context which usually requires a surname (last name). One should always refer to him using the full name Kyranbek Makhan or simply his first name Kyranbek.
