= Zhou Peng (basketball) =

Chinese basketball player

Zhou Peng 周鹏
No. 11 – Guangdong Southern Tigers
- Position: Small forward
- League: CBA

Personal information
- Born: October 11, 1989 (age 37) Dandong, Liaoning, China
- Listed height: 2.06 m (6 ft 9 in)

Career information
- Playing career: 2006–present

Career history

Playing
- 2006–2022: Guangdong Southern Tigers
- 2022–2026: Shenzhen Leopards
- 2026–present: Guangdong Southern Tigers

Coaching
- 2024–2025: Shenzhen Leopards

Career highlights
- 8× CBA champion (2008–2011, 2013, 2019–2021); 2× CBA All-Star (2016, 2021); CBA Best Defender (2021)
Medals
Men's basketball
Representing China
FIBA Asia Championship
Gold medal – first place	2015 Changsha
Asian Games
Gold medal – first place	2010 Guangzhou	Team
FIBA Asia Under-18 Championship
Gold medal – first place	2006 Urumqi

Zhou Peng (Chinese: 周鹏; pinyin: Zhōu Péng born October 11, 1989) is a Chinese professional basketball player who plays for the Guangdong Southern Tigers of the Chinese Basketball Association (CBA). He was the captain of the Chinese National basketball team at the 2016 Rio Olympics.

On 29 August 2026, Zhou has returned to Guangdong Southern Tigers with one year contract.

== Career statistics ==
=== CBA ===
Year	Team	GP	RPG	APG	FG%	FT%	PPG
2006–07	Guangdong	33	1.9	0.7	.483	.667	4.2
2007–08	Guangdong	41	1.6	1.0	.379	.677	5.3
2008–09	Guangdong	59	2.8	1.5	.523	.654	9.6
2009–10	Guangdong	35	3.4	1.1	.512	.622	11.1
2010–11	Guangdong	43	3.0	1.3	.491	.775	9.9
2011–12	Guangdong	43	3.3	1.5	.440	.863	11.0
2012–13	Guangdong	29	2.8	0.8	.443	.612	7.4
2013–14	Guangdong	39	2.6	1.1	.473	.636	8.9
2014–15	Guangdong	33	2.3	1.9	.456	.750	9.6
Career		355	2.6	1.2	.467	.695	8.6
