= CBA Best Defender =

Annual Chinese basketball award

The Chinese Basketball Association (CBA) Best Defender Award is an annual Chinese Basketball League (CBA) award given since the 2008–09 season. The main criteria for the award is that the player must attain either of the following: highest blocks per game average, highest steals per game or at least accumulated a high average of steals and blocks. The awardee is selected from players voted into the all-defensive quintet team.

== List of Recipients ==
Season	Player	Team
2008–09	(United States) Chris Williams	Qingdao Eagles
2009–10	(China) Hu Xuefeng	Jiangsu Dragons
2010–11	(China) Hu Xuefeng (2×)	Jiangsu Dragons
2011–12	(China) Zhang Zhaoxu	Shanghai Sharks
2012–13	(Senegal) Hamady N'Diaye	Tianjin Pioneers
2013–14	(China) Zhang Zhaoxu (2×)	Shanghai Sharks
2014–15	(Iran) Hamed Haddadi	Qingdao DoubleStar Eagles
2015–16	(China) Zhou Qi	Xinjiang Flying Tigers
2016–17	(China) Zhou Qi (2×)	Xinjiang Flying Tigers
2017–18	(United States) Courtney Fortson	Zhejiang Lions
2018–19	(China) Yi Jianlian	Guangdong Southern Tigers
2019–20	(China) Zhou Qi (3×)	Xinjiang Flying Tigers
2020–21	(China) Zhou Peng	Guangdong Southern Tigers
2021–22	(China) Shen Zijie	Shenzhen Leopards
2022–23	(China) Shen Zijie (2×)	Shenzhen Leopards
2023–24	(China) Yang Hansen	Qingdao Eagles
2024–25	(China) Sun Minghui	Zhejiang Lions
2025–26	(United States) Hassan Whiteside	Shanghai Sharks

== Multiple time winners ==
Total	Player
3	Zhou Qi
2	Zhang Zhaoxu
2	Hu Xuefeng
2	Shen Zijie
