= Kevin Zhang =

Chinese basketball player (born 1999)

Kevin Zhang 张镇麟
No. 77 – Shanghai Sharks
- Position: Power forward
- League: CBA

Personal information
- Born: 28 January 1999 (age 27) Shenyang, Liaoning, China
- Listed height: 2.05 m (6 ft 9 in)
- Listed weight: 103 kg (227 lb)

Career information
- High school: La Lumiere School (La Porte, Indiana); Montverde Academy (Montverde, Florida)
- College: Tulane (2018–2020)

Career history
- 2020–2025: Liaoning Flying Leopards
- 2025–present: Shanghai Sharks

Career highlights
- 3× CBA champion (2022, 2023, 2024); CBA Club Cup champion (2026); All-CBA Domestic First Team (2023); 3× All-CBA Domestic Second Team (2021, 2024, 2026); CBA Finals Rising Star (2024); 4× CBA All-Star (2022, 2023, 2024, 2026); CBA All-Star Rookie (2021); CBA Slam Dunk Contest Champion (2021); CBA All-Star Rookie MVP (2021); CBA Rookie of the Year (2021); Nike Hoop Summit (2018)
Medals
Men's basketball
Representing China
Asian Games
Bronze medal – third place	2022 Hangzhou

Zhang Zhenlin (Chinese: 张镇麟; born 28 January 1999), or Kevin Zhang, is a Chinese professional basketball player for the Shanghai Sharks of the Chinese Basketball Association (CBA). He played college basketball for the Tulane Green Wave.

== Early life and high school career ==
Born in Shenyang, China, Zhang grew up watching National Basketball Association (NBA) players Steve Nash and LeBron James and aspired to play basketball in the United States. In 2013, at age 14, he joined the United States Basketball Academy in Blue River, Oregon upon the advice of his mother's friend, Bruce O'Neil. Zhang spoke no English at the time. In his first three years of high school, he played for La Lumiere School in LaPorte, Indiana, where he played with top recruits Jaren Jackson Jr. and Brian Bowen. Over three seasons at La Lumiere, he helped his team to a combined 82–7 record and the 2017 High School Nationals title.

As a senior, Zhang played for Montverde Academy in Montverde, Florida, helping his team achieve a 35–0 record and win High School Nationals. At the National Prep Showcase in November 2017, he scored 25 points and had five three-pointers against New Hampton School. He was friends with Montverde teammate RJ Barrett, the number one recruit in the 2018 class. On 13 April 2018, Zhang played for Team World at the Nike Hoop Summit. Five days later, he committed to play college basketball for Tulane over offers from UCLA, BYU, DePaul and Kansas State, among other NCAA Division I programs. He was rated a three-star recruit by major recruiting services.

== College career ==
On 11 November 2018, Zhang made his freshman season debut for Tulane, leading his team with 24 points and seven rebounds in an 80–69 loss to 15th-ranked Florida State. After hyperextending his elbow on 8 December versus South Alabama, he sat out his next game against Texas Southern and was limited by the injury in many of his following games. On 13 January 2019, Zhang scored a season-high 25 points in an 83–79 loss to Memphis. As a freshman, he averaged 6.5 points and 2.4 rebounds in 22.5 minutes per game. Tulane finished with a 4–27 record, losing all 18 of its conference games, and Zhang was one of two players to return for the following season amid a roster and coaching overhaul.

On 4 January 2020, as a sophomore, he scored a season-high 15 points, converting on all five of his three-point attempts, in a 76–71 upset win over Cincinnati. Zhang finished the season averaging 5.1 points and 2.1 rebounds in 19.2 minutes per game.

== Professional career ==
=== Liaoning Flying Leopards (2020-2021) ===
On 19 October 2020, Zhang made his professional debut for the Liaoning Flying Leopards of the Chinese Basketball Association (CBA), recording 13 points and 11 rebounds in a 121–108 win over the Tianjin Pioneers.

On 8 March 2021, Zhang scored a career-high 46 points and 9 rebounds in a 124-115 win over Guangdong Southern Tigers.

=== 2022 Summer League with Phoenix Suns ===
On July 8, 2022, Zhang was confirmed to play for the 2022 NBA Summer League, where he would play for the Phoenix Suns. The same day, he would make his debut against the Los Angeles Lakers for the first game, where Zheng would score five points in three minutes in a win for the Suns where then won 110-84. In his second game against the Washington Wizards, Zhang would play seven minutes, and would score five points, yet once again in a loss against them, where the score was 90-72. In his third game with the Dallas Mavericks, Zhang scored nine points in six minutes in a win against the Mavericks, where the score was 105-78. In the same game, he would also face off against fellow Chinese player, Guo Haowen. That would be Zhang's final game as he wouldn't play in game four against the Sacramento Kings, where the Suns would lose 76-94.

=== Shangai Sharks (2025-present) ===
On 29 August 2025, Zhang transferred to Shanghai Sharks.

== National team career ==
Zhang joined the China national basketball team for training camp in preparation for the 2019 FIBA Basketball World Cup but did not make the final roster.

Zhang was selected into the final roster of China men's national basketball team competing for the FIBA Asian Cup 2021 Qualifiers.

He was included in China's squad for the 2023 FIBA Basketball World Cup qualification, and had his debut national match against Japan on 28 November 2021.

== Career statistics ==
Legend
GP	Games played	GS	Games started	MPG	Minutes per game
FG%	Field goal percentage	3P%	3-point field goal percentage	FT%	Free throw percentage
RPG	Rebounds per game	APG	Assists per game	SPG	Steals per game
BPG	Blocks per game	PPG	Points per game	**Bold**	Career high

=== College ===
Year	Team	GP	GS	MPG	FG%	3P%	FT%	RPG	APG	SPG	BPG	PPG
2018–19	Tulane	**30**	16	**22.5**	.354	.295	**.757**	**2.4**	**.8**	.4	.4	**6.5**
2019–20	Tulane	**30**	**19**	19.2	**.410**	**.324**	.696	2.1	.5	**.6**	**.6**	5.1
Career		60	35	20.8	.377	.308	.733	2.3	.6	.5	.5	5.8

=== CBA ===
==== Regular season ====
Year	Team	GP	GS	MPG	FG%	3P%	FT%	RPG	APG	SPG	BPG	PPG
2020–21	Liaoning	**53**	43	**32.3**	.491	.385	**.705**	**5.6**	**1.5**	1.2	.4	**14.2**
Career		53	43	32.3	.491	.385	.705	5.6	1.5	1.2	.4	14.2

==== Playoffs ====
Year	Team	GP	GS	MPG	FG%	3P%	FT%	RPG	APG	SPG	BPG	PPG
2020–21	Liaoning	**6**	4	**35.8**	.424	.314	**.500**	**6.2**	**1.2**	1.5	.2	**11.5**
Career		6	4	35.8	.424	.314	.500	6.2	1.2	1.5	.2	11.5

== Personal life ==
Zhang's mother, Wang Fang, played basketball for China at the 1992 Summer Olympics. She won the Women's Chinese Basketball Association (WCBA) title in 2009 while the head coach of the Liaoning Flying Eagles. Wang was a coach for the Chinese women's team at the 2008 Summer Olympics.
