= Hu Xuefeng =

Chinese basketball player and coach

Hu Xuefeng 胡雪峰
No. 55 – Jiangsu Dragons
- Position: Point guard
- League: Chinese Basketball Association

Personal information
- Born: January 14, 1980 (age 46) Suzhou, Jiangsu, China
- Listed height: 6 ft 1 in (1.85 m)
- Listed weight: 187 lb (85 kg)

Career information
- NBA draft: 2002: undrafted
- Playing career: 1999–2017
- Coaching career: 2014–present

Career history

Playing
- 1999–2017: Jiangsu Dragons

Coaching
- 2013–2017: Jiangsu Dragons (assistant)
- 2017–2021: Jiangsu Dragons
- 2014: China (assistant)

Career highlights
- As Player: CBA All-time Steals Record Holder; CBA Best Rookie (2000); 2× CBA Best Defender (2010, 2011); 2× CBA assists champion (2005, 2006); 6× CBA steals champion (2000, 2005–2007, 2011, 2016)
Medals
Men's basketball
Representing China
FIBA Asia Championship
Silver medal – second place	2009 Tianjin	Team
Asian Games
Gold medal – first place	2006 Doha	Team
East Asian Games
Gold medal – first place	2001 Osaka	Team
FIBA Asia Under-20 Championship
Bronze medal – third place	2000 Doha

Hu Xuefeng (Chinese: 胡雪峰; pinyin: hú xuě fēng; born 14 January 1980 in Changshu, Suzhou, Jiangsu) is a Chinese basketball coach and former professional player who played for the Jiangsu Dragons of the Chinese Basketball Association (CBA) since 1999. He was also a member of the final roster of the Chinese national basketball team in 2009 Asia Championship.

As a guard, Hu is a defensive expert. He holds the CBA records for career steals. He is second to Lü Xiaoming in career assists in CBA. He is one of the two players (only domestic player) who has ever achieved a quadruple-double in CBA games. He also made triple-double several times and one of them was made of assists, steals, and rebounds, but not points.
