= Zhou Qi =

Chinese basketball player (born 1996)

Zhou Qi 周琦
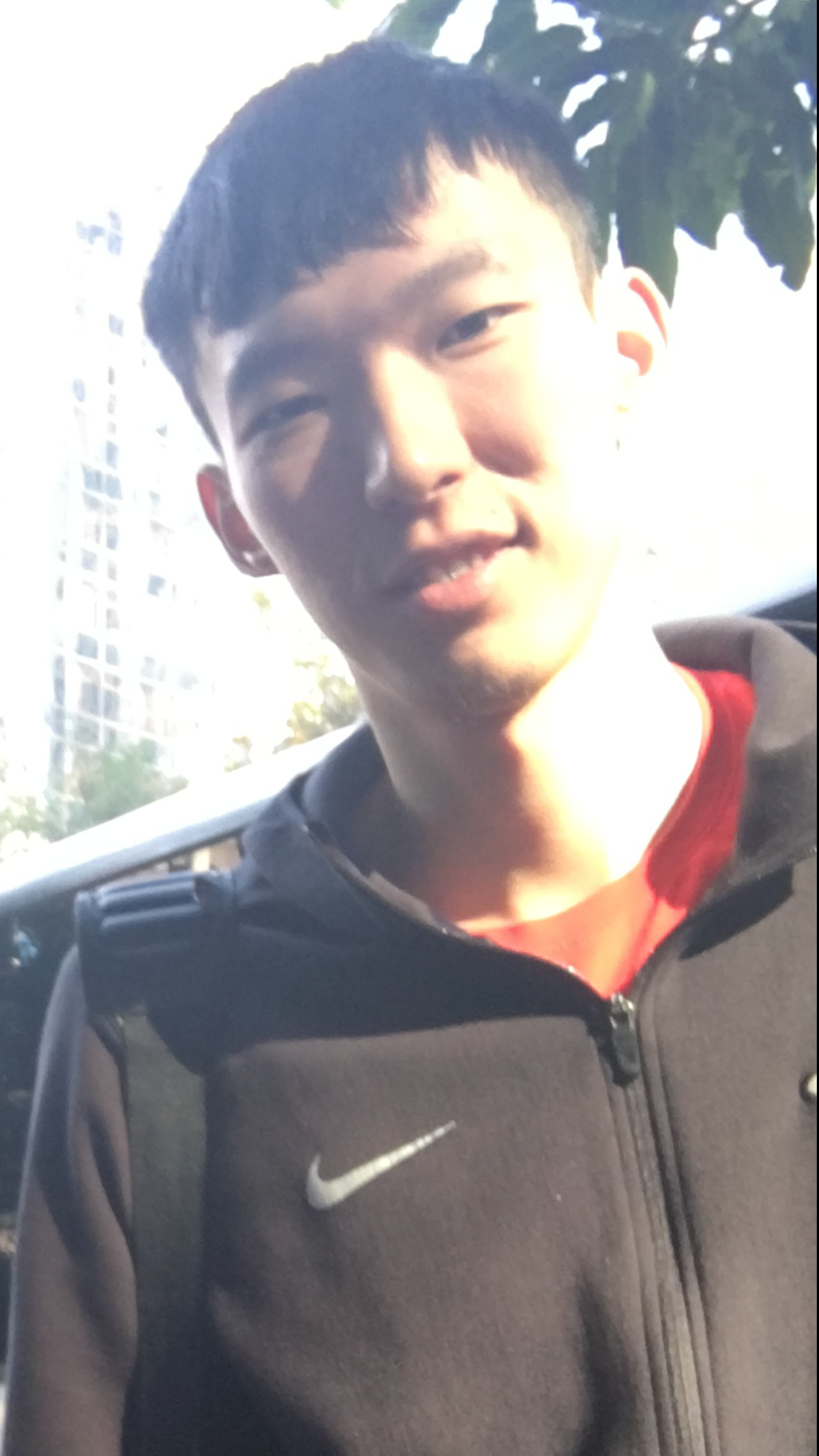
- Zhou in 2017

No. 27 – Beijing Ducks
- Position: Center
- League: CBA

Personal information
- Born: 16 January 1996 (age 30) Xinxiang, Henan, China
- Listed height: 216 cm (7 ft 1 in)
- Listed weight: 96 kg (212 lb)

Career information
- NBA draft: 2016: 2nd round, 43rd overall pick
- Drafted by: Houston Rockets
- Playing career: 2014–present

Career history
- 2014–2017: Xinjiang Flying Tigers
- 2017–2018: Houston Rockets
- 2017–2018: →Rio Grande Valley Vipers
- 2019–2021: Xinjiang Flying Tigers
- 2021–2022: South East Melbourne Phoenix
- 2023–2024: Guangdong Southern Tigers
- 2024–present: Beijing Ducks

Career highlights
- CBA champion (2017); 3× CBA Best Defender (2016, 2017, 2020); 4× CBA All-Star (2015–2017, 2020, 2021); 2× CBA blocks leader (2015, 2016); FIBA Asia Champions Cup champion (2016); CBA Rookie of the Year Award (2015); All-CBA Second Team (2020); All-CBA First Team (2021)
- Stats at NBA.com
- Stats at Basketball Reference
Medals
Men's basketball
Representing China
FIBA Asia Cup
Gold medal – first place	2015 Changsha
Asian Games
Gold medal – first place	2018 Jakarta-Palembang
FIBA Asia Under-18 Championship
Gold medal – first place	2012 Ulan Bator
Gold medal – first place	2014 Doha
FIBA Under-16 Asia Cup
Gold medal – first place	2011 Nha Trang

Zhou Qi (Chinese: 周琦; pinyin: Zhōu Qí [ʈʂóʊ tɕʰǐ]; born 16 January 1996) is a Chinese professional basketball player for the Beijing Ducks of the Chinese Basketball Association (CBA). He has been a regular member of the China men's national basketball team since 2014, winning a gold team medal in the 2015 FIBA Asia Championship and the 2018 Asian Games.

A center, Zhou started his professional career playing for the Xinjiang Flying Tigers of the Chinese Basketball Association (CBA). In 2016, he entered the NBA draft and was selected 43rd overall by the Houston Rockets of the National Basketball Association (NBA). He played a total of 19 games across two seasons with the Rockets before being waived in 2018. Zhou returned to the Flying Tigers of the CBA soon after. In 2021, he joined the South East Melbourne Phoenix in the Australian National Basketball League (NBL).

== Early career ==
Zhou Qi attended Fuxin Basketball School in 2005 in Fuxin, Liaoning, China.

Zhou first began appearing on scouting reports when he guided China to an unlikely youth team title in Turkey at the TBF International Under-16 Tournament in 2011. At age fifteen, Zhou put up 41 points, 28 rebounds, and 15 blocks in China's semifinal win over Germany, and then went for 30 points, 17 rebounds, and 8 blocks in the final against the host nation. A year later at the 2012 Albert Schweitzer Tournament, a traditional testing ground for the best teenage players in international basketball, Zhou reinforced his reputation as one to watch by averaging 16.2 points, 7.8 rebounds, and 4.2 blocks in 28.2 minutes per game.

In January 2014, Zhou left his boyhood team, the Liaoning Jaguars, to join the Xinjiang Flying Tigers. However, he was unable to play for Xinjiang until the 2014–15 season due to being underaged.

== Professional career ==
=== Xinjiang Flying Tigers (2014–2017) ===
Although there were rumors that several U.S. college teams were courting him, the teenager decided to stay in China, and his move to the cash-flush Xinjiang team caused a firestorm of speculation within the local media. Initially, it was claimed Zhou had accepted a three-year, $744,000 deal that would have made him better paid than most of the Tigers' roster at the time, and the club was forced to publicly deny those stories.

In 2015–16, Xinjiang lost in the semifinals of the CBA playoffs. Zhou led the CBA in blocked shots in each of his first two seasons at 3.3 and 3.2 per game, respectively, while shooting 65 percent from two-point range in 73 total games.

In June 2016, Zhou reached an agreement with Xinjiang that would allow him to buy out his contract and join the NBA in 2017. After much back and forth, Zhou's representation in China and the U.S. secured a buyout that would allow him out of his contract after the 2016–17 season for the maximum league-mandated amount permitted, which is $675,000.

In 2016–17, Zhou averaged 16.0 points and 10.0 rebounds while shooting 58.6% from the floor. He also ranked second in the CBA in blocks (2.3 bpg) and was named Defensive Player of the Year. Zhou hit 20 3-pointers in 2016–17 after having 10 in his first two seasons combined. He also helped Xinjiang win its first championship in 2016–17.

=== Houston Rockets (2017–2018) ===
After his second season with Xinjiang, Zhou declared for the 2016 NBA draft. He had the longest wingspan during the 2016 NBA Draft Combine at 7 ft 7 3/4 in (2.330 m). On 23 June 2016, he was selected with the 43rd overall pick by the Houston Rockets.

On 6 July 2017, Zhou signed with the Houston Rockets. He made his NBA debut on 21 October 2017, playing eight minutes in the fourth quarter of the Rockets' 107–91 win over the Dallas Mavericks, posting three rebounds and one block. On 1 November 2017, Zhou scored his first NBA points, finishing with three points against the New York Knicks. During his rookie season, Zhou had multiple assignments to the Rio Grande Valley Vipers of the NBA G League.

On 17 December 2018, the Rockets waived Zhou.

=== Return to the Flying Tigers (2019–2021) ===
In August 2019, Zhou returned to the Xinjiang Flying Tigers.

=== South East Melbourne Phoenix (2021–2022) ===
On 8 September 2021, Zhou signed a two-year deal with the South East Melbourne Phoenix of the Australian National Basketball League (NBL) as a Special Restricted Player, with the second year being a player option.

On 27 September 2022, Zhou recommitted to the Phoenix for the 2022–23 NBL season. On 19 December 2022, he left the team and returned to China for family reasons.

=== Return to CBA ===
Zhou Qi joined the Guangdong Southern Tigers for the 2023-24 CBA season.

== National team career ==
Zhou made his debut with the senior Chinese national team during the 2014 Asian Games in Incheon, South Korea. He returned for the 2015 FIBA Asia Championship in Changsha, China, where he helped China win the championship with a win over the Philippines in the final. Zhou had 16 points and 14 rebounds in the championship game. He was subsequently named to the 2015 FIBA Asia Championship All-Star Five. Zhou later competed in the 2016 Summer Olympics with the Chinese national team.

== Career statistics ==
Legend
GP	Games played	GS	Games started	MPG	Minutes per game
FG%	Field goal percentage	3P%	3-point field goal percentage	FT%	Free throw percentage
RPG	Rebounds per game	APG	Assists per game	SPG	Steals per game
BPG	Blocks per game	PPG	Points per game	**Bold**	Career high

=== NBA ===
==== Regular season ====
Year	Team	GP	GS	MPG	FG%	3P%	FT%	RPG	APG	SPG	BPG	PPG
2017–18	Houston	**18**	0	**6.9**	.188	**.105**	**.667**	**1.2**	**.1**	**.1**	**.8**	1.2
2018–19	Houston	1	0	1.0	**1.000**	—	—	.0	.0	.0	.0	**2.0**
Career		19	0	6.6	21.2	10.5	66.7	1.2	.1	.1	.7	1.3

==== Playoffs ====
Year	Team	GP	GS	MPG	FG%	3P%	FT%	RPG	APG	SPG	BPG	PPG
2018	Houston	3	0	2.0	1.000	—	—	.3	.0	.0	.0	.7
Career		3	0	2.0	1.000	—	—	.3	.0	.0	.0	.7

=== CBA ===
Year	Team	GP	GS	MPG	FG%	3P%	FT%	RPG	APG	SPG	BPG	PPG
2014–15	Xinjiang	31	20	29.1	.696	.100	.740	6.9	.7	.8	3.2	14.0
2015–16	Xinjiang	42	40	34.2	.603	.600	.758	9.7	1.5	1.1	3.1	15.8
2016–17	Xinjiang	44	41	32.8	.558	.364	.717	9.9	1.1	1.0	2.3	15.9
2019–20	Xinjiang	44	44	33.1	.534	.311	.694	13.1	1.9	1.2	2.2	21.9
2020–21	Xinjiang	44	38	32.7	.517	.291	.590	11.8	2.7	1.0	2.2	20.7
2023–24	Guangdong	35	34	26.3	.617	.356	.583	11.4	1.3	0.5	1.3	16.9
2024–25	Beijing	27	24	26.8	.593	.410	.614	8.3	1.8	0.7	1.9	14.6
Career		267	241	31.1	.570	.328	.667	10.4	1.6	1.0	2.4	17.5

=== NBL ===
Year	Team	GP	GS	MPG	FG%	3P%	FT%	RPG	APG	SPG	BPG	PPG
2021–22	Phoenix	**24**	**23**	**21.1**	.636	.000	**.604**	**6.6**	**0.5**	**0.4**	**1.8**	11.6
2022–23	Phoenix	9	0	13.5	**.656**	.000	.538	4.4	0.2	0.2	0.2	6.2
Career		33	23	19.0	.639	.000	.589	6.0	0.4	0.3	1.4	10.1
