= Jia Mingru =

Chinese basketball player

Jia Mingru 贾明儒
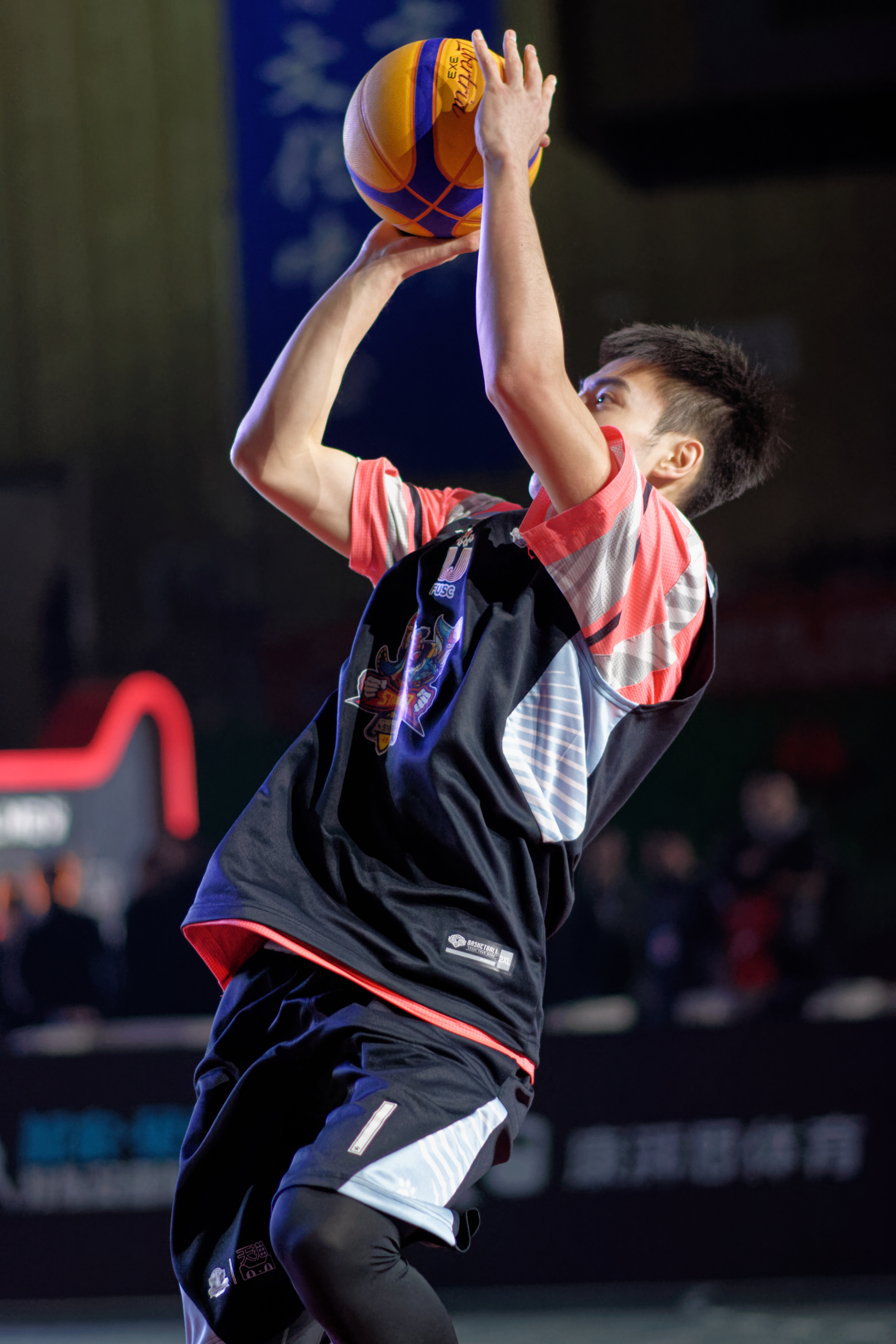
- Jia at Chinese University Basketball Association 3X3 Basketball Competition in Beijing, 2019

No. 3 – Shanxi Loongs
- Position: Point guard
- League: CBA

Personal information
- Born: February 16, 1997 (age 29) Siping, Jilin, China
- Listed height: 1.83 m (6 ft 0 in)
- Listed weight: 79 kg (174 lb)

Career information
- College: Civil Aviation University of China (2014–2019)
- Playing career: 2019–present

Career history
- 2019–2024: Guangzhou Long-Lions
- 2024–present: Shanxi Loongs

Jia Mingru (Chinese: 贾明儒, born February 16, 1997) is a Chinese professional basketball player for the Shanxi Loongs in the Chinese Basketball Association (CBA). Jia Mingru is a point guard.

== Personal life ==
Jia Mingru was born in Siping, Jilin, China.

== College career ==
Jia Mingru played college basketball for the Civil Aviation University of China team in the Chinese University Basketball Association (CUBA) league. Jia being a fan of Michael Jordan since his childhood, his jersey number was 23. In his college career, he participated in 63 games and scored 950 points, ranking 7th in the history of CUBA league. He averaged 15.1 points, 3.3 rebounds, and 2.8 assists per game.

He also participated to the FISU World University 3X3 Championship in Xiamen, Fujian in November 2016 and the 3x3 FISU World University League (2018) Finals in November 2018.

== Professional career ==
Jia Mingru signed an early training agreement with the Guangzhou Loong Lions and joined the team directly after graduating from college in June 2019. In the 2020-21 CBA season, he averages 4.8 points, 1.6 rebounds and 1.5 assists per game.
