= Zhang Zhaoxu =

Chinese basketball player

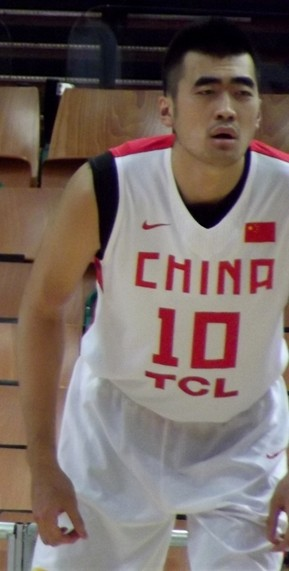

Beijing Royal Fighters
- Position: Assistant coach
- League: CBA

Personal information
- Born: November 18, 1987 (age 38) Yantai, Shandong, China
- Listed height: 7 ft 3 in (2.21 m)
- Listed weight: 235 lb (107 kg)

Career information
- College: California (2008–2010)
- Playing career: 2010–2023

Career history

Playing
- 2010–2021: Shanghai Sharks
- 2021–2023: Tianjin Pioneers

Coaching
- 2025–2026: Ningbo Rockets (assistant)
- 2026–present: Beijing Royal Fighters (assistant)

Career highlights
- 2× CBA Best Defender (2011, 2014); CBA blocks leader (2014, 2018)
Medals
Men's basketball
Representing China
FIBA Asia Championship
Gold medal – first place	2011 Wuhan	Team
Asian Games
Gold medal – first place	2010 Guangzhou	Team

Zhang Zhaoxu

Chinese name
- Traditional Chinese: 張兆旭
- Simplified Chinese: 张兆旭
Transcriptions
Standard Mandarin
- Hanyu Pinyin: Zhāng Zhàoxù
- Wade–Giles: Chang Chao-hsü

English name
- English: Max Zhang

Zhang Zhaoxu (Chinese: 张兆旭; pinyin: Zhāng Zhàoxù) or Max Zhang (born November 18, 1987) is a Chinese former professional basketball player, and current assistant coach for the Beijing Royal Fighters of the Chinese Basketball Association (CBA). Earlier he has played for the University of California, Berkeley, and was also a member of the Chinese national basketball team. Max features in the YouTube series 'The Shark Knight' on the Donnie Does Channel.

== NCAA career ==
Zhang played two seasons (2008–2010) at California. As a freshman and a sophomore, he saw action off the bench in 42 total games over two years for the Golden Bears.

== Chinese national team ==
Zhang is also a member of the Chinese national basketball team. He competed with the Chinese junior team at the 2009 World University Games. After competing several times as a junior for the junior national team, he made his senior team debut at the 2010 FIBA World Championship in Turkey and competed at the 2012 Summer Olympics.
