= Shirelijan Muxtar =

Chinese basketball player of Uyghur origin

Shirelijan Muxtar شىرئەلىجان مۇختەر 西热力江·木合塔尔
Personal information
- Born: Kashgar, Xinjiang, China
- Listed height: 1.98 m (6 ft 6 in)
- Listed weight: 95 kg (209 lb)

Career information
- Playing career: 2008–2023
- Position: Point guard / Shooting guard

Career history

Playing
- 2008–2018: Xinjiang Flying Tigers
- 2018–2019: Guangzhou Loong Lions
- 2019–2020: Xinjiang Flying Tigers
- 2020–2023: Nanjing Tongxi Monkey Kings

Coaching
- 2022–2024: Nanjing Tongxi Monkey Kings

Career highlights
- 1× CBA Champion (2017)
Medals
Men's basketball
Representing China
FIBA Asia Championship
Gold medal – first place	2011 Wuhan
East Asian Games
Silver medal – second place	2013 Tianjin

Shirelijan Muxtar
Other names
- Alternative spelling: Shirelijan Muxtar; Xirelijan Muxtar; Shirelijan Muhtar; Xirelijan Muhtar; Xirelijiang Muhetaer

Shirelijan Muxtar (Uyghur: شىرئەلىجان مۇختەر; simplified Chinese: 西热力江·木合塔尔; traditional Chinese: 西熱力江·木合塔爾; pinyin: Xīrèlìjiāng · Mùhétǎěr) is a Chinese basketball coach and former professional player of Uyghur origin, who played the combo guard position for the Chinese national team. He is an elite three point shooter and perimeter defender, currently the 10th all-time CBA three point leader. Shirelijan played with the Xinjiang Flying Tigers for 11 years and was an important part of their three consecutive Grand Finals from 2009 to 2011 and their first championship in the 2016–17 season. He is widely regarded as the most iconic player of the Xinjiang Flying Tigers and a popular contender for the all-time greatest Flying Tiger.

== Career ==
Shirelijan Muxtar was promoted to the first team of Xinjiang Flying Tigers and debuted in Chinese Basketball Association in the 2008–09 season. He was an important part of the team's three consecutive trips to the Grand Finals in the 2008-09, 2009–10, and 2010–11 seasons, serving as an elite perimeter defender for the team. Through the seasons, he also became an elite three point shooter, and is currently the 10th all-time CBA three-point leader.

In the 2016–17 season, Shirelijan started 30 of the 45 regular season games he played, averaging 30.0 minutes per game. He also averaged 8.5 points, 3.0 rebounds, 2.2 three pointers, 1.8 steals, and 1.7 assists per game. He played an important role in the first CBA championship for the Xinjiang Flying Tigers franchise.

Before the 2018–19 season, Shirelijan was rented to Guangzhou Loong Lions for one year in a blockbuster trade. In the same trade, Xinjiang traded Yao Tianyi and rented Sun Mingyang for three years to Guangzhou, and Guangzhou rented Fan Ziming for two years to Xinjiang. Shirelijan returned to Xinjiang Flying Tigers after the one-year rental terminated.

After the 2019–20 season, Shirelijan's contract with Xinjiang Flying Tigers terminated, and he became a free agent. He signed a three-year max (type-D) contract with Nanjing Monkey Kings, averaging 8 million CNY (US$1.2 million) a year. He is the most notable free-agent pick for Nanjing Monkey Kings in their first year of rebuild.

== Name ==
There are several alternative spellings to his name. Shirelijan, or alternatively Xirelijan, is the direct transliteration of his first name from his native Uyghur language. Alternatively, some sources indirectly transliterated his name via Mandarin Chinese (西热力江) as Xirelijiang. His patronym's direct translation from Uyghur is Muxtar, or alternatively, Muhtar. The indirect transliteration via Mandarin (木合塔尔) is Muhetaer. Therefore, alternative spellings of his full name include:

- Shirelijan Muxtar
- Shirelijan Muhtar
- Xirelijan Muhtar
- Xirelijan Muxtar
- Xirelijiang Muhetaer

Some sources mistake his patronym's indirect transliteration via Mandarin as Mugedaer. Some sources also mistake his name as a Chinese name, thus treating his first name as the surname or applying the Eastern name order.

As a Uyghur name, Shirelijan Muxtar uses the patronymic system and consists of the given (first) name Shirelijan and the patronym (father's name) Muxtar. Therefore, Muxtar is the name of Shirelijan's father. In general, it is not acceptable to refer to him using only Muxtar, even in a context which usually requires a surname (last name). One should always refer to him using the full name Shirelijan Muxtar or simply his first name Shirelijan.
