= Gao Shiyan =

Chinese basketball player (born 1996)

Gao Shiyan 高诗岩
No. 1 – Shandong Heroes
- Position: Point guard
- League: CBA

Personal information
- Born: 22 January 1996 (age 30) Dandong, Liaoning, China
- Listed height: 1.85 m (6 ft 1 in)

Career information
- NBA draft: 2018: undrafted
- Playing career: 2015–present

Career history
- 2015–2017: Liaoning Flying Leopards
- 2017–2018: Jilin Northeast Tigers
- 2018–2020: Liaoning Flying Leopards
- 2020–present: Shandong Hi-Speed Kirin
Medals
Men's basketball
Representing China
FIBA Asia Cup
Silver medal – second place	2025 Saudi Arabia

Gao Shiyan (born 22 January 1996) is a Chinese basketball player for Shandong Hi-Speed Kirin and the Chinese 3x3 national team.

He represented China at the 2020 Summer Olympics.
