= Hu Mingxuan =

Chinese basketball player (born 1998)

No. 3 – Guangdong Southern Tigers
- Position: Point guard
- League: CBA

Personal information
- Born: 10 March 1998 (age 28) Ürümqi, Xinjiang, China
- Listed height: 6 ft 4 in (1.93 m)

Career information
- Playing career: 2017–present

Career history
- 2017–present: Guangdong Southern Tigers

Career highlights
- 3× CBA champion (2019–2021); CBA Finals MVP (2021); CBA All-Star Game MVP (2024)
Medals
Men's basketball
Representing China
Asian Games
Bronze medal – third place	2022 Hangzhou
FIBA Asia Cup
Silver medal – second place	2025 Saudi Arabia

Hu Mingxuan (Chinese: 胡明轩; born March 10, 1998) is a Chinese professional basketball player for the Guangdong Southern Tigers, and the national team. He plays the point guard position. He was included in the Chinese national team's squad for the 2019 FIBA Basketball World Cup.

In the 2020–21 Chinese Basketball Association season, Hu Mingxuan became the Most Valuable Player of the Finals.

In October 2021, Hu secured a comeback 111-108 victory for his Guangdong Southern Tigers against Sichuan Blue Whales by scoring a career-high 36 points. He shot 11-for-28 in 29 minutes. Hu made all four free throws from a double-foul call and a back-court foul to pocket the victory.
