= Wu Qian (basketball, born 1994) =

Chinese basketball player

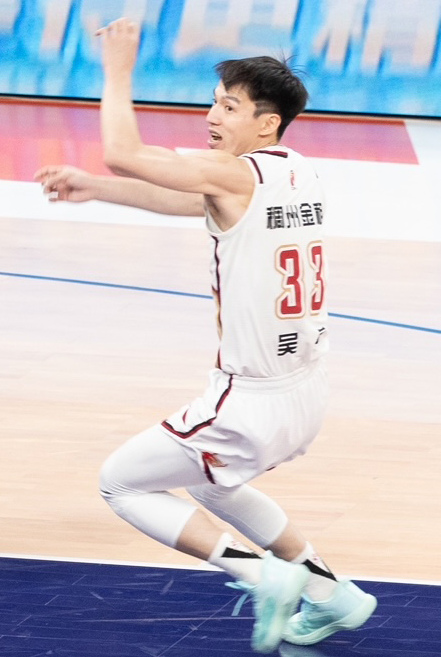
- Wu Qian in 2024

No. 33 – Zhejiang Golden Bulls
- Position: Shooting guard
- League: Chinese Basketball Association

Personal information
- Born: July 7, 1994 (age 32) Wenzhou, Zhejiang, China
- Listed height: 6 ft 3 in (1.91 m)

Career information
- Playing career: 2012–present

Career history
- 2017–present: Zhejiang Golden Bulls

Career highlights
- CBA Most Valuable Player (2021)

Wu Qian (Chinese: 吴前, born July 7, 1994) is a Chinese professional basketball player who plays for the Zhejiang Golden Bulls of the Chinese Basketball Association.

He represented China's national basketball team at the 2017 FIBA Asia Cup in Zouk Mikael, Lebanon, where he recorded China's best 2 point field goal percentage.

In the 2020–21 Chinese Basketball Association season he won the CBA Most Valuable Player award.

Wu was included in China's squad for the 2023 FIBA Basketball World Cup qualification.
