= Meng Xiang and Meng Yuan =

Pair of twin giant pandas (born 2019)

- Other names: Pit and Paule
- Species: Giant panda
- Sex: Male
- Born: 31 August 2019 (age 7); Berlin Zoo, Germany
- Parents: Jiao Qing (father); Meng Meng (mother)

Meng Xiang (Chinese: 梦想; pinyin: Mèngxiǎng; lit. 'Long-awaited dream', nicknamed Pit) and Meng Yuan (Chinese: 梦圆; pinyin: Mèng yuán; lit. 'Fulfilled dream', nicknamed Paule) are two twin male giant pandas born on 31 August 2019 at the Berlin Zoo, making them the first giant pandas born in Germany. Their father Jiao Qing and mother Meng Meng were both from Sichuan, and arrived in Berlin for 75th anniversary of diplomatic relations between China and Germany in 2017.

In December 2023, the two pandas were flown to China and relocated to the Chengdu Panda Base. Their handover was contractually agreed to between Germany and China, but was delayed by the COVID-19 pandemic.

== Life ==
Meng Xiang and Meng Yuan were born on 31 August 2019 at the Berlin Zoo, making them the first giant pandas born in Germany. Meng Yuan is 48 minutes younger than Meng Xiang. Their father Jiao Qing and mother Meng Meng were both born in Sichuan, and arrived in Berlin for the 75th anniversary of diplomatic relations between China and Germany in 2017. Meng Xiang and Meng Yuan have two twin siblings, Meng Hao and Meng Tian.

The births of Meng Xiang and Meng Yuan coincided with the 2019–2020 Hong Kong protests, bringing controversy to the naming of the twin panda cubs. Joshua Wong, a Hong Kong pro-democracy activist, suggested that they should be named "Democracy" and "Freedom", while the people of Berlin suggested the names "Hong Hong", "Kong Kong", "Hotdog", and "Fries", but the two pandas were named "Meng Xiang" and "Meng Yuan", which mean "Long-awaited dream" and "Fulfilled dream", respectively. The two pandas are also nicknamed "Pit" and "Paule".

Meng Xiang and Meng Yuan are on lease from China for a provisional period of 15 years, but in December 2023, the two pandas were sent to China, and the Berlin Zoo held a farewell event. Their handover was contractually agreed to between Germany and China, but was delayed by the COVID-19 pandemic.

== See also ==
- List of individual giant pandas
- List of individual bears
