= Chongqing University of Arts and Sciences =

University in Chongqing, China

- 重庆文理学院
- Type: Public university
- Established: 2005
- Administrative staff: 1,342
- Students: 13,000
- Location: Chongqing, China
- Campus: Suburban
- Website: http://www.cqwu.edu.cn/

Chongqing University of Arts and Sciences (Chinese: 重庆文理学院), formerly known as Western Chongqing University (Chinese: 渝西学院) is a public university located in Chongqing, China. It is a full-time public undergraduate college covering science, engineering, economics, management, law, literature and art.

== History ==
The university was created in 2005 from the merger of two higher education institutions. They were the Chongqing Normal Academy (重庆师范高等专科学校) which was founded in 1956 and the Chongqing Teaching College (渝州教育学院) established in 1972.

== Administration ==
The university is organized into the following departments.

=== Department Structure ===
- Department of Literature and Communication
- Department of Foreign Languages
- Department of Law and Political Science
- Department of Economic Management
- Education Department
- Department of Mathematics and Computer Science
- Department of Physics and Information Engineering
- Department of Chemistry and Environmental Science
- Biology Department
- Music Department
- Department of Physical Education
- Department of Fine Arts
- Department of College English Teaching
- School of Applied Science and Technology
- School of Adult Education
- Training School
