= Yannis Christopoulos =

Greek professional basketball coach

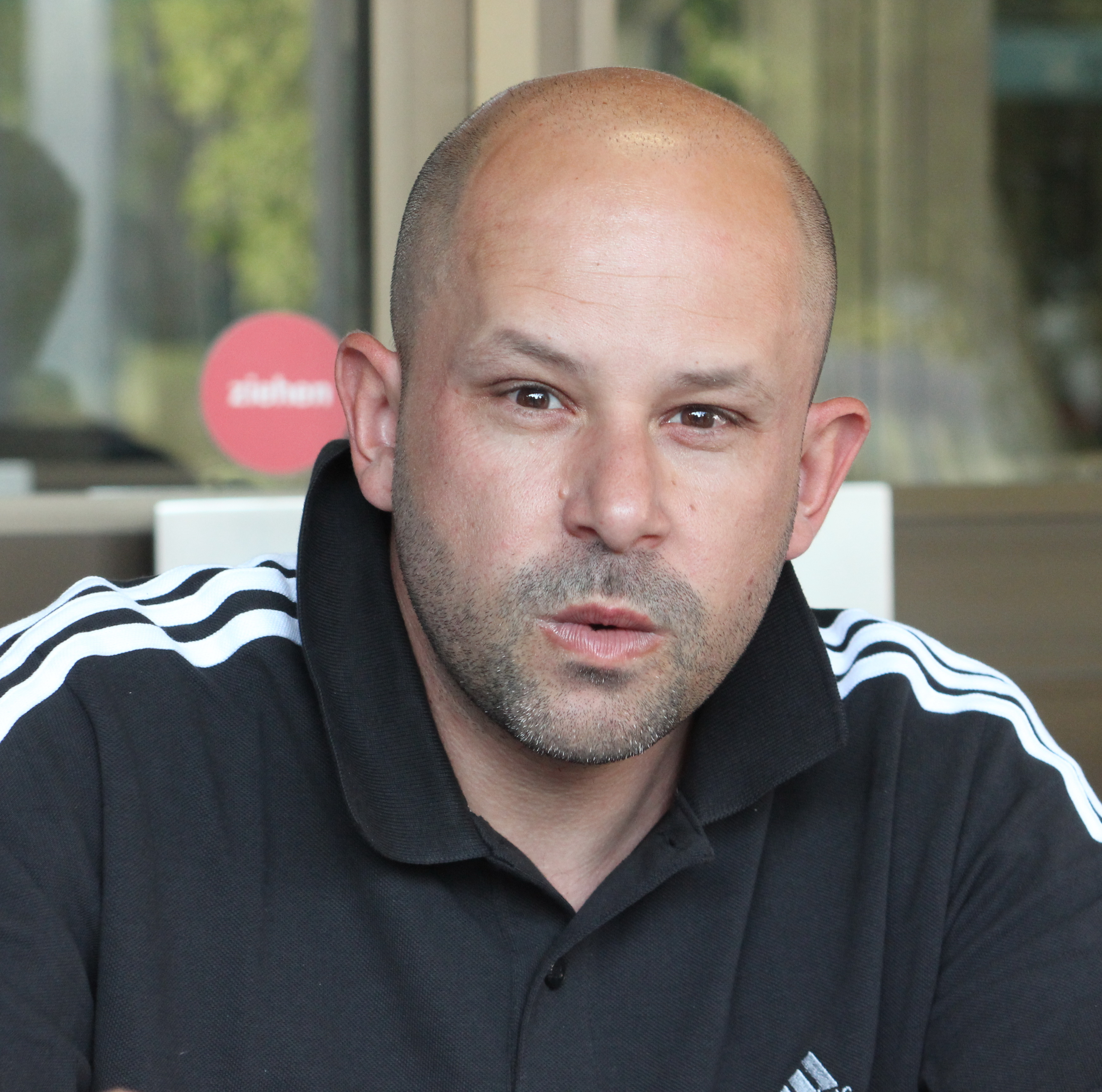
- Christopoulos with Bayern Munich in 2012

Personal information
- Born: June 7, 1974 (age 52) Patras, Greece
- Listed height: 6 ft 1 in (1.85 m)
- Position: Head coach
- Coaching career: 1996–present

Career history

Coaching
- 1996–1997: "U" SM Invest Cluj-Napoca (juniors)
- 1997–2000: Apollon Patras (assistant)
- 2000–2001: Brandt Hagen (assistant)
- 2001–2003: Hellenic Air Force men's basketball team
- 2004: AEL Limassol
- 2004–2005: APOEL Nicosia
- 2005–2006: Apollon Patras
- 2006–2007: AEL Larissa
- 2007–2008: Olympias Patras
- 2008: Trikala 2000
- 2010–2011: APOEL Nicosia
- 2010–2012: Bayern Munich (assistant)
- 2012: Bayern Munich
- 2013–2017: China (assistant)
- 2017–2020: Beijing Ducks
- 2021–2022: Beijing Ducks
- 2022–2023: Promitheas Patras
- 2023–2024: Apollon Patras

Career highlights
- As head coach: Cypriot League champion (2010); Cypriot Super Cup winner (2011)

Yannis Christopoulos (alternate spelling: Giannis; Greek: Γιάννης Χριστόπουλος; born 7 June 1974 in Patras) is a Greek professional basketball coach.

== Coaching career ==
Christopoulos began his coaching career in 1996, at the age of 22, with the youth departments of the Romanian club "U" SM Invest Cluj-Napoca. He then became an assistant coach with Apollon Patras, where he worked under head coach Dirk Bauermann. He also worked as an assistant coach under Bauermann in the German club Brandt Hagen.

Christopoulos' career as a club head coach started in 2004, in Cyprus, with Proteas EKA AEL. He was also the head coach of Apollon Patras. As the head coach of APOEL, he won the Cypriot League championship in 2010.

He became an assistant coach under Dirk Bauermann again, this time with Bayern Munich. After Bauermann left as Bayern's head coach, on 27 September 2012, Christopoulos was promoted to be the team's new head coach for the 2012–13 season. However, on 27 November 2012, he was replaced as the team's head coach by Svetislav Pešić.

== Awards and accomplishments ==
- Cypriot League champion: 2010
- Cypriot Super Cup winner: 2011
