= Conson Gymnasium =

Sports venue in Qingdao, China

Qingdao Sports Centre Conson Gymnasium
- The Diamond
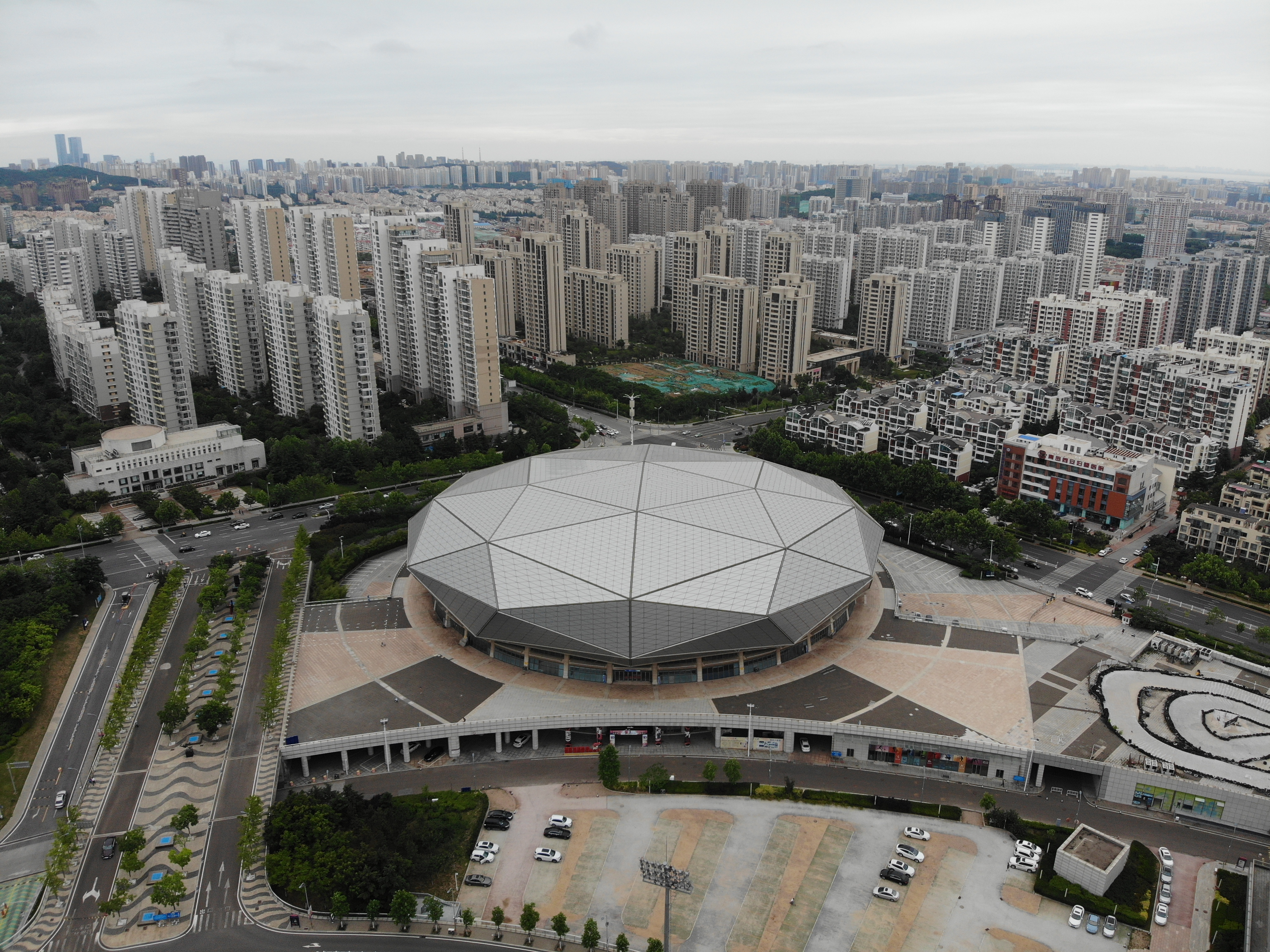
- Interactive map of Qingdao Sports Centre Conson Gymnasium
- Full name: Qingdao Sports Centre Conson Gymnasium
- Location: Qingdao, China
- Coordinates: 36°06′15″N 120°26′10″E
- Owner: Qingdao Conson Development (Group) Co. Ltd
- Capacity: 12,500

Construction
- Groundbreaking: November 19, 2004
- Opened: March 11, 2009

Tenants
- Qingdao Eagles (CBA) (2012–present); Qingdao Clipper (CAFL) (2016)

Qingdao Sports Centre Conson Gymnasium (official name) is an indoor sporting arena located in Qingdao, China, used mostly for basketball and arena football games. The capacity of the arena is 12,500 spectators. It hosts indoor sporting events such as badminton, basketball, concerts, gymnastics, table tennis and volleyball.

== Notable events ==
- Super Show 3 - Super Junior The 3rd ASIA Tour, August 28, 2010, with a sold-out crowd of 12,000 people.
- 2011 Sudirman Cup
- On 20 May 2017, Joker Xue, a Chinese singer-songwriter, headlined the arena as part of his I Think I've Seen You Somewhere Tour.
- 2025 Badminton Asia Mixed Team Championships

== See also ==
- Qingdao Conson Stadium
- List of indoor arenas in China
