= Dominique Jones =

American basketball player (born 1988)

Free agent
- Position: Point guard / shooting guard

Personal information
- Born: October 15, 1988 (age 38) Lake Wales, Florida, U.S.
- Listed height: 6 ft 5 in (1.96 m)
- Listed weight: 215 lb (98 kg)

Career information
- High school: Lake Wales (Lake Wales, Florida)
- College: South Florida (2007–2010)
- NBA draft: 2010: 1st round, 25th overall pick
- Drafted by: Memphis Grizzlies
- Playing career: 2010–present

Career history
- 2010–2013: Dallas Mavericks
- 2010, 2012: →Texas Legends
- 2013: Springfield Armor
- 2013–2014: Liaoning Flying Leopards
- 2014–2015: Jilin Northeast Tigers
- 2015: Atenienses de Manatí
- 2015: Shanxi Zhongyu
- 2016–2017: Qingdao DoubleStar
- 2017: Azad University Tehran
- 2017: Nanjing Monkey Kings
- 2018: Petrochimi Bandar Imam
- 2018–2023: Jilin Northeast Tigers
- 2019: Guangxi Rhinos
- 2023–2024: Xinjiang Flying Tigers
- 2024: Hong Kong Bulls
- 2024–2025: Jilin Northeast Tigers
- 2025: Changsha Yongsheng
- 2026: Indian Railways

Career highlights
- NBA champion (2011); NBL champion (2024); NBL Finals MVP (2024); CBA International MVP (2023); CBA All-Star (2025); 3× CBA assists leaders (2015, 2023, 2025); CBA steals leader (2023); West Asian Basketball Cup champion (2018); First-team All-Big East (2010)
- Stats at NBA.com
- Stats at Basketball Reference
Medals
Men's 3x3 basketball
Representing the United States
Pan American Games
Gold medal – first place	2019 Lima	Men's tournament

Dominique O'Neal Jones (born October 15, 1988) is an American professional basketball player. A noted scorer in college at the University of South Florida, Jones had the second-highest scoring average in the Big East Conference during the 2009–10 season. Jones has had a long career in the CBA and was named the league's MVP in 2023.

== College career ==
=== Freshman ===
Jones entered USF and started every game during his first season. He scored 17.1 points per game with 4.6 rebounds and 2.8 assists.

=== Sophomore ===
In Jones's second season, the sophomore improved his scoring (18.1), rebounds (5.6) and assists (3.9) averages.

=== Junior ===
Prior to the 2009–2010 season, Jones was named to the preseason All Big East team. Over the season, he averaged 21.4 points while also grabbing 6.1 rebounds and giving 3.6 assists. He scored a season high 46 points in a 109–105 win over the Providence Friars. USF went 20–13 and Jones was named to the 1st team All-Big East team. He led the team with the most points in a game.

== Professional career ==
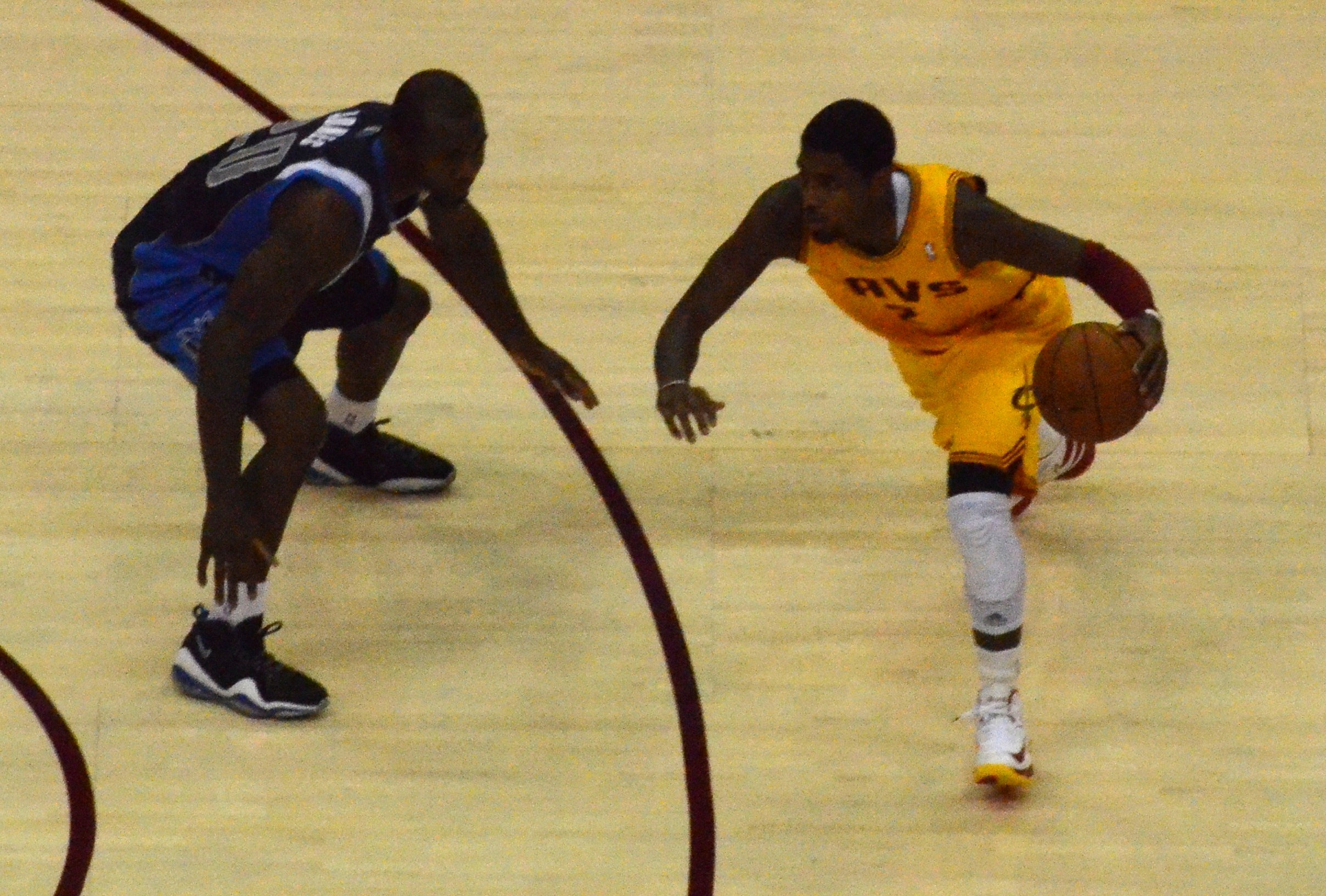
Jones (left) guarding Kyrie Irving in 2012

He was selected by the Memphis Grizzlies with the 25th overall pick in the 2010 NBA draft. The Grizzlies traded his rights to the Dallas Mavericks for cash considerations, reported to be around $3 million.

On November 30, 2010, the Mavericks assigned Jones to the Texas Legends of the NBA D-League, only to be called up early January 2011 after an injury to Caron Butler. He scored nine points in his return, in a 104–95 Dallas win over the Cleveland Cavaliers. A foot injury sidelined him for much of the season after averaging 2.3 points in 18 games. At the end of the season, the Mavericks would win the 2011 NBA Finals.

On January 15, 2012, Dallas assigned Jones to the D-League again. He would be recalled a week later. On February 19, 2012, Jones made his first career three-point field goal against the New York Knicks. On March 10, 2012, Jones recorded his first career start in an 87–111 loss to the Golden State Warriors.

In October 2012, the Mavericks opted not to pick up the team option for the next season in Jones's rookie contract. Jones was waived on March 9, 2013. On March 19, he was acquired by the Springfield Armor of the NBA D-League.

He joined the Milwaukee Bucks for the 2013 NBA Summer League. In September 2013, he joined the Liaoning Flying Leopards of the Chinese Basketball Association for the 2013–14 season.

On October 11, 2014, he signed with the Jilin Northeast Tigers for the 2014–15 CBA season. Following the CBA season, he signed with Atenienses de Manatí on March 18 for the rest of the 2015 BSN season.

On July 8, 2015, Jones returned to China and signed with Shanxi Zhongyu. In December 2015, he parted ways with Shanxi.

On August 23, 2016, Jones signed with Qingdao DoubleStar for the 2016–17 CBA season.

On August 11, 2017, Jones signed with Nanjing Monkey Kings of the Chinese Basketball Association. On December 12, 2017, he was waived by the Nanjing Monkey Kings.

On January 11, 2018, Jones signed with Petrochimi Bandar Imam of the Iranian Super League.

On August 7, 2018, Jones signed with the Jilin Northeast Tigers of the Chinese Basketball Association (CBA). In the 2022–23 season, Jones led the league in assists and steals and was named the league's International MVP.

On August 25, 2023, Jones moved to the Xinjiang Flying Tigers.

On September 25, 2024, Jones signed with the Jilin Northeast Tigers.

=== The Basketball Tournament ===
In 2017, Jones competed in The Basketball Tournament with the Tampa Bulls, a team made up of USF alumni. Jones' team made it to the Sweet 16 where they were eliminated by eventual champions Overseas Elite. Jones led the team with 28.3 PPG during the tournament.

== Career statistics ==
Legend
GP	Games played	GS	Games started	MPG	Minutes per game
FG%	Field goal percentage	3P%	3-point field goal percentage	FT%	Free throw percentage
RPG	Rebounds per game	APG	Assists per game	SPG	Steals per game
BPG	Blocks per game	PPG	Points per game	**Bold**	Career high
†	Won an NBA championship

=== NBA ===
Year	Team	GP	GS	MPG	FG%	3P%	FT%	RPG	APG	SPG	BPG	PPG
2010–11†	Dallas	18	0	7.5	.311	.000	**.824**	1.4	1.1	.3	**.2**	2.3
2011–12	Dallas	**33**	1	8.1	**.397**	**.125**	.784	1.3	1.3	.3	**.2**	2.7
2012–13	Dallas	29	**3**	**11.7**	.367	.111	.660	**1.6**	**2.9**	**.5**	.1	**4.0**
Career		80	4	9.3	.366	.095	.729	1.4	1.8	.4	.1	3.1

=== CBA ===
Year	Team	GP	GS	MPG	FG%	3P%	FT%	RPG	APG	SPG	BPG	PPG
2013–14	Liaoning Flying Leopards	38	33	35.3	.473	.278	.759	5.5	6.0	2.4	0.3	24.6
2014–15	Jilin Northeast Tigers	41	37	40.8	.480	.329	.752	7.8	8.4	2.7	0.5	36.8
2015–16	Shanxi Brave Dragons	18	16	**41.8**	.450	.275	.777	8.6	7.4	**3.0**	0.3	32.8
2016–17	Qingdao Eagles	37	37	39.2	.486	.296	.739	8.2	6.2	1.6	0.5	30.2
2017–18	Nanjing Monkey Kings	14	14	34.4	.461	.260	**.838**	6.9	5.3	1.0	0.4	28.9
2018–19	Jilin Northeast Tigers	**46**	**46**	34.5	**.498**	**.302**	.780	7.5	8.1	1.8	0.6	28.3
2019–20	Jilin Northeast Tigers	28	28	39.8	.467	.283	.806	8.3	8.9	2.0	0.6	37.8
2020–21	Jilin Northeast Tigers	37	37	40.2	.459	.261	.736	**10.9**	**9.5**	2.2	0.6	**38.2**
2021–22	Jilin Northeast Tigers	25	25	38.8	.445	.255	.763	10.0	9.0	2.4	**1.1**	26.5

== Personal life ==
Jones' forearms are tattooed with the words "Hustler" and "Survivor". After the Mavericks won the 2011 NBA Finals, Jones then proceeded to get a tattoo on his neck of the Larry O'Brien Championship Trophy, commemorating his team's victory.
