= Guo Shiqiang =

Chinese basketball player and coach

Guo Shiqiang 郭士强
China men's national basketball team
- Title: Head coach

Personal information
- Born: July 8, 1975 (age 51) Liaoyang, Liaoning, China
- Listed height: 1.93 m (6 ft 4 in)
- Listed weight: 80 kg (176 lb)

Career information
- College: Liaoning Sport Technology College
- Playing career: 1993–2005
- Position: Guard
- Number: 13 (club), 6 (national team)
- Coaching career: 2006–present

Career history

Playing
- 1993–1996: Liaoning Hunters
- 1996–1997: Sichuan Pandas
- 1998–2005: Liaoning Hunters

Coaching
- 2005: China U21 (assistant)
- 2005: China (assistant)
- 2005: Liaoning Hunters (assistant)
- 2005–2006: Liaoning Golden Leopards (assistant)
- 2006–2009: Liaoning Hunters
- 2006–2008: China (assistant)
- 2009–2010: China
- 2010–2011: Liaoning Dinosaurs
- 2010: China (assistant)
- 2013–2020: Liaoning Flying Leopards
- 2020–2024: Guangzhou Loong Lions
- 2021–2024: China (assistant)
- 2024–present: China

Career highlights
- As head coach: 2× CBA Coach of the Year (2007, 2008); CBA champion (2018); As assistant coach: WCBA champion (2006)
Medals
Men's basketball
Representing China
Asian Games
Silver medal – second place	2002 Busan	Team
FIBA Asia Championship
Gold medal – first place	2003 Harbin	Team
Silver medal – second place	2009 Tianjin	Head coach
East Asian Games
Gold medal – first place	2001 Osaka	Team
Universiade Games
Silver medal – second place	2001 Beijing	Team

Guo Shiqiang (Chinese: 郭士强, born 8 July 1975) is a former Chinese professional basketball player and current head coach for the China men's national basketball team. He is the uncle of Guo Ailun.

== Playing career ==
Guo started his professional career in 1993, and spent most of his career at the Liaoning Hunters, and was a longtime member of the Chinese national team, appearing with the team at the 2000 and 2004 Olympics, as well as the 2002 FIBA World Championship. He also helped the team win the gold medal at the ABC Championship 2003.

== Managerial career ==
Guo announced his retirement in 2005 at the age of 30. He stepped up as the head coach of Liaoning Hunters in 2006 after Jiang Xingquan left, and helped Liaoning Hunters to enter the semi-finals of the 2006-07 season, and further into the finals of the 2007-08 season. He also worked as the assistant coach of the Liaoning women's basketball team shortly in 2006.

In 2009, he was selected as one of the coaches for the Chinese national basketball team, together with Adjan and Min Lulei. He coached the national team for the first time at the FIBA Asia Championship 2009, guiding the team to a silver medal and a berth at the 2010 FIBA World Championship.

In 2010, he shortly returned to Liaoning, and resigned in 2011. Since 2013, he returned to his home team, now renamed Liaoning Flying Leopards, and stayed with the team until 2020. He claimed the first CBA title both for him and for the team in the 2018 season. He also sided with Liaoning in the 2017 National Games, and won the gold medal.

In June 2020, Guo decided to quit his job at Liaoning due to recent poor performance. In August, he signed with Guangzhou Loong Lions.
