= 2008–09 Chinese Basketball Association season =

2008–09 CBA season
- League: Chinese Basketball Association
- Sport: Basketball
- Duration: November 15, 2008 – May 3, 2009
- TV partner(s): CCTV-5, and many local channels.

Regular Season
- Season champions: Guangdong Southern Tigers
- Season MVP: (China) Mengke Bateer

Finals
- Champions: Guangdong Southern Tigers
- Runners-up: Xinjiang Flying Tigers
- Finals MVP: (China) Zhu Fangyu

CBA seasons
- ← 2007–08 2009–10 →

The 2008–09 CBA season was the 14th CBA season. Guangdong Southern Tigers defended their CBA title after defeating Xinjiang Flying Tigers in the Finals, four games to one.

Tianjin Ronggang were promoted to the CBA after the team owners voted in favor of them over two other candidates, Qingdao DoubleStar and Guangdong Fenglü. Qingdao later replaced Beijing Aoshen for their place in the CBA, when the latter failed to submit relevant files on time and lost their qualification for the season.

Foreign players of each team could play unlimited time each game, except only 5 quarters collectively when facing Bayi Rockets. The two newly promoted teams and the bottom two teams of the last season could each have one extra Asian foreign players.

== Regular Season standings ==
#	2008–09 CBA season							
#	Team	W	L	PCT	GB	Home	Road	Tiebreaker
1	Guangdong Southern Tigers	45	5	.900	-	24–1	21–4	
2	Xinjiang Flying Tigers	44	6	.880	1	24–1	20–5	
3	Jiangsu Dragons	36	14	.720	9	20–5	16–9	
4	Shaanxi Kylins	30	20	.600	15	21–4	9–16	
5	Dongguan Leopards	29	21	.580	16	18–7	11–4	DG 3-1 FJ
6	Fujian Xunxing	29	21	.580	16	20–5	9–16	DG 3-1 FJ
7	Zhejiang Lions	28	22	.560	17	16–9	12–13	
8	Shandong Lions	27	23	.540	18	16–9	11–14	SD 2-2(417–400) BJ
9	Beijing Ducks	27	23	.540	18	17–8	10–15	SD 2-2(417–400) BJ
10	Shanxi Zhongyu	26	24	.520	19	15–10	11–14	
11	Bayi Rockets	25	25	.500	20	14–11	11–14	
12	Liaoning Dinosaurs	24	26	.480	21	11–14	13–12	
13	Jilin Northeast Tigers	23	27	.460	22	13–12	10–15	
14	Zhejiang Whirlwinds	19	31	.380	26	13–12	6–19	
15	Qingdao DoubleStar	13	37	.260	32	10–15	3–22	QD 2-2(361–358) TJ
16	Tianjin Ronggang	13	37	.260	32	8–17	5–20	QD 2-2(361–358) TJ
17	Shanghai Sharks	6	44	.120	39	5–20	1–24	SH 2-2(436–406) YN
18	Yunnan Bulls	6	44	.120	39	6-19	0–25	SH 2-2(436–406) YN

Key to colors
Top 8 teams advance to the Playoffs

== Playoffs ==
Teams in bold advanced to the next round. The numbers to the left of each team indicate the team's seeding in regular season, and the numbers to the right indicate the number of games the team won in that round. Home court advantage belongs to the team with the better regular season record; teams enjoying the home advantage are shown in italics.

Quarter Finals
1	**Guangdong Southern Tigers**	**3**
8	Shandong Lions	0
4	Shaanxi Kylins	0
5	**Dongguan Leopards**	**3**
3	**Jiangsu Dragons**	**3**
6	Fujian Xunxing	0
2	**Xinjiang Flying Tigers**	**3**
7	Zhejiang Lions	0

Semi-Finals
1	**Guangdong Southern Tigers**	**3**
5	Dongguan Leopards	0
3	Jiangsu Dragons	1
2	**Xinjiang Flying Tigers**	**3**

Final
1	**Guangdong Southern Tigers**	**4**
2	Xinjiang Flying Tigers	1
