= 2007 FIBA Asia Championship squads =

These are the team rosters of the 16 teams competing in the 2007 FIBA Asia Championship.

== Group A ==
=== China ===
Head coach: (China) Adiljan Jun

#	Pos	Name	Club	Date of Birth	Height
4	PG	Han Shuo	(China) Jiangsu Nangang Dragons	14 May 1986 (aged 21)	1.96 m (6 ft 5 in)
5	PG	Yang Ming	(China) Liaoning Panpan Hunters	31 July 1985 (aged 21)	1.93 m (6 ft 4 in)
6	SG	Bian Qiang	(China) Liaoning Panpan Hunters	24 January 1979 (aged 28)	1.92 m (6 ft 3 1/2 in)
7	SG	Chen Lei	(China) Beijing Shougang Ducks	14 January 1983 (aged 24)	1.95 m (6 ft 5 in)
8	G/F	Chen Chen	(China) Bayi Army Rockets	26 November 1985 (aged 21)	1.97 m (6 ft 5 1/2 in)
9	SF	Yi Li	(China) Jiangsu Nangang Dragons	7 November 1985 (aged 21)	2.03 m (6 ft 8 in)
10	PF	Wang Yong	(China) Shanghai Dongfang Sharks	11 November 1986 (aged 20)	2.05 m (6 ft 8 1/2 in)
11	SF	Wang Bo	(China) Jilin Northeast Tigers	4 November 1982 (aged 24)	2.03 m (6 ft 8 in)
12	PF	Li Ke	(China) Bayi Army Rockets	16 May 1980 (aged 27)	2.07 m (6 ft 9 1/2 in)
13	F/C	Wu Qian	(China) Bayi Army Rockets	21 July 1986 (aged 21)	2.05 m (6 ft 8 1/2 in)
14	C	Gu Liye	(China) Liaoning Panpan Hunters	10 February 1985 (aged 22)	2.08 m (6 ft 10 in)
15	C	Zhang Kai	(China) Dongguan New Century Leopards	1 December 1982 (aged 24)	2.12 m (6 ft 11 1/2 in)

=== Iran ===
Head coach: (Serbia) Rajko Toroman

#	Pos	Name	Club	Date of Birth	Height
4	F/C	Ali Doraghi	(Iran) Petrochimi Bandar Imam	20 September 1984 (aged 22)	2.11 m (6 ft 11 in)
5	G	Amir Amini	(Iran) Paykan Tehran	10 June 1984 (aged 23)	1.91 m (6 ft 3 in)
6	PG	Javad Davari	(Iran) Zob Ahan Isfahan	25 April 1983 (aged 24)	1.86 m (6 ft 1 in)
7	PG	Mehdi Kamrani	(Iran) Mahram Tehran	1 June 1982 (aged 25)	1.83 m (6 ft 0 in)
8	SF	Aidin Nikkhah Bahrami	(Iran) Saba Battery Tehran	5 February 1982 (aged 25)	2.02 m (6 ft 7 1/2 in)
9	G/F	Mohammad Reza Akbari	(Iran) Zob Ahan Isfahan	20 September 1986 (aged 20)	1.96 m (6 ft 5 in)
10	SG	Hamed Afagh	(Iran) Saba Battery Tehran	1 February 1983 (aged 24)	1.93 m (6 ft 4 in)
11	C	Jaber Rouzbahani	(Iran) Zob Ahan Isfahan	10 May 1986 (aged 21)	2.24 m (7 ft 4 in)
12	PF	Oshin Sahakian	(Iran) Zob Ahan Isfahan	21 March 1986 (aged 21)	2.01 m (6 ft 7 in)
13	F/C	Mousa Nabipour	(Iran) Shahrdari Gorgan	14 August 1983 (aged 23)	2.10 m (6 ft 10 1/2 in)
14	SF	Samad Nikkhah Bahrami	(Iran) Mahram Tehran	11 May 1983 (aged 24)	1.98 m (6 ft 6 in)
15	C	Hamed Haddadi	(Iran) Paykan Tehran	19 May 1985 (aged 22)	2.18 m (7 ft 2 in)

=== Jordan ===
Pos.	No.	Player	Club
		Islam Abbaas
		Zaid Abbaas
		Zaid Al-Khas
		Wesam Al-Sous
		Mousa Alawadi
		Fadel Kamal Abdelrahman Anajjar
		Mousa Salah Bashir	(Israel) Hapoel Jerusalem
		Isa Beida Kamel	(Israel) Hapoel Jerusalem
		Osama Daghles
		Camile Gargour
		Ayman Idais
		Enver Soobzokov
		Rashiem Wright
Position			Name/s
Head coach:			(Portugal) Mario Palma
			Jordan

=== Philippines ===
Pos.	No.	Player	Club/School
G	4	Mark Caguioa	(Philippines) Barangay Ginebra Kings
F	5	Danny Seigle	(Philippines) San Miguel Beermen
G	6	Jimmy Alapag	(Philippines) Talk 'N Text Phone Pals
G	7	Dondon Hontiveros	(Philippines) San Miguel Beermen
C	8	Asi Taulava	(Philippines) Talk 'N Text Phone Pals
F	9	Kelly Williams	(Philippines) Sta. Lucia Realtors
F	10	Gabe Norwood	(United States) George Mason Patriots
C	11	Mick Pennisi	(Philippines) Red Bull Barako
F	12	Kerby Raymundo	(Philippines) Purefoods TJ Giants
G	13	Jayjay Helterbrand	(Philippines) Barangay Ginebra Kings
G	14	Ren-Ren Ritualo	(Philippines) Talk 'N Text Phone Pals
F	15	Eric Menk	(Philippines) Barangay Ginebra Kings
Position			Name/s
Head coach:			(Philippines) Chot Reyes
			Philippines

== Group B ==
=== Japan ===
Pos.	No.	Player	Club
SG	4	Takuya Kawamura	(Japan) OSG Phoenix
PF	5	Daiji Yamada	(Japan) Toyota Alvark
PG	6	Ryota Sakurai	(Japan) Toyota Alvark
PG	7	Kenichi Sako	(Japan) Aishin Seahorses
PG	8	Shinsuke Kashiwagi	(Japan) Hitachi Sunrockers
SG	9	Takehiko Orimo	(Japan) Aishin Seahorses
PF	10	Kosuke Takeuchi	(Japan) Aishin Seahorses
PF	11	Tomoo Amino	(Japan) Aisin Seahorses
PG	12	Kei Igarashi	(Japan) Hitachi Sunrockers
C	13	Fumihiko Aono	(Japan) Matsushita Electric Panasonic Kangaroos
C	14	J. R. Sakuragi	(Puerto Rico) Grises de Humacao
PF	15	Joji Takeuchi	(Japan) Tokai University
Position			Name/s
Head coach:			(Japan) Kimikazu Suzuki
			Japan

=== Kuwait ===
Pos.	No.	Player	Club
		Ahmad Albahrim
		Hussain Alkahabbaz
		Mohammad Almutairi
		Fahad Alrabah
		Rashid Alrabah
		Sulaiman Altabakh
		Mohammed Ashkanani
		Saqer Hasan
		Yousef Mohammad
		Osamah Mubarak
		Shayee Saeed
Position			Name/s
Head coach:			(Kuwait) Fahmi Al Khadra
			Kuwait

=== Lebanon ===
Pos.	No.	Player	Club
SG	4	Jean Abdel-Nour	(Lebanon) Blue Stars
F	5	Hussein Tawbe	(Lebanon) Al Riyadi Beirut
G	6	Ali Mahmoud	(Lebanon) Al Riyadi Beirut
G	7	Rony Fahed	(Lebanon) Blue Stars
SG	8	Omar El Turk	(Lebanon) Al Riyadi Beirut
F	9	Bassem Balaa	(Lebanon) Al Hikmeh Sagesse
C	10	Roy Samaha	(Lebanon) Blue Stars
C	11	Joe Vogel	(Lebanon) Al Riyadi Beirut
F	12	Ali Fakhreddine	(Lebanon) Al Riyadi Beirut
F	13	Brian Beshara-Feghali	(Lebanon) Champville
SG	14	Mazan Mneimneh	(Lebanon) Al Riyadi Beirut
SG	15	Fadi El Khatib	(Lebanon) Al Hikmeh Sagesse
Position			Name/s
Head coach:			(Cyprus) Dragan Raca
			Lebanon

=== United Arab Emirates ===
Pos.	No.	Player	Club
		Jasim Mohammed Abadalla
		Ahmad Moosa Ahmad
		Mohammad Mubarak Alajmani
		Ayoub Ahmad Albalooshi
		Ali Mohd Abbas Alhattawi
		Talal Salem Alnuaimi
		Hassan Ali Alsalmin
		Matar Abdalla Alsuwaidi
		Rashed Naser Alzaabi
		Jassim Abdulredha Haji
		Younis Khamis Ibrahim
		Saeed Khalfan Khalfan
Position			Name/s
Head coach:			(Bosnia and Herzegovina) Zoran Zupcevic
			United Arab Emirates

== Group C ==
=== India ===
Pos.	No.	Player	Club
		Shiv Kumar
		Sambhaji Kadam
		Ravikumar Krishnasamy
		Anoop Mukkanniyil
		Roshan Thankachan Padavetiyil
		Rajanna Sanjay Raj
		Trideep Rai
		Muraleekrishna Ravindran
		Dilawar Singh
		Jagdeep Singh
		Riyaz Uddin
		Lokesh Yodav
Position			Name/s
Head coach:			(Serbia) Aleksandar Bućan
			India

=== Indonesia ===
Pos.	No.	Player	Club
	6	Faisal Julius Achmad
C	4	Raka Cokorda
	8	Andrie Ekayana
	13	Rony Gunawan	(Indonesia) Satria Muda Pertamina
	12	Agustinus Indrajaya
F	5	Andi Poedjakesuma	(Indonesia) Dell Aspac
	7	Amin Prihantono
	14	Wellyanson Situmorang	(Indonesia) Satria Muda Pertamina
G	9	Youbel Sondakh	(Indonesia) Satria Muda Pertamina
	11	Andre Tiara
	15	Wahyu Widayat Jati
PG	10	Mario Wuysang	(Indonesia) Aspac Jakarta
Position			Name/s
Head coach:			(Indonesia) Rastafari Horongbala
			Indonesia

=== Kazakhstan ===
Pos.	No.	Player	Club
		Yegor Biryulin
		Dmitriy Gavrilov
		Yevgeniy Issakov
		Dmitriy Korovnikov
		Ivan Nechayev
		Anton Ponomarev
		Andrey Shpekht
		Artyom Skornyakov
		Alexandr Tyutyunik
		Maxim Voyeikov
		Rustam Yargaliyew
		Mikhail Yevtigneyev
Position			Name/s
Head coach:			(Russia) Vitali Strebkov
			Kazakhstan

=== Qatar ===
Pos.	No.	Player	Club
		Khalid Suliman Abdi	(Qatar) Al Sadd
		Khalid Masoud Al Nasr
		Ali Turki Ali	(Qatar) Army
		Saad Abdulrahman Ali	(Qatar) Al Sadd
		Daoud Mosa Daoud	Qatar Sports Club
		Baker Ahmad Mohammed	(Qatar) Army
		Yasseen Ismail Musa
		Erfan Ali Saeed
		Malek Saleem Abdullah	(Qatar) Al Rayyan
		Mohammed Saleem Abdullah	(Qatar) Al Rayyan
		Omar Abgader Salem	(Qatar) Al Rayyan
		Hashim Zaidan	(Qatar) Ah-Ahli
Position			Name/s
Head coach:			(United States) Ed Andrist
			Qatar

== Group D ==
=== Chinese Taipei ===
Pos.	No.	Player	Club
G	4	Chen Shih-nien
G	5	Hsu Hao-cheng
G	6	Lee Hsueh-lin
C	7	Wu Tai-hao
C	8	Tseng Wen-ting
F	9	Yang Che-yi
F	10	Yueh Ying-li
F	11	Lee Chi-yi
F	12	Lin Chih-chieh
F	13	Chen Hsin-an
F	14	Lu Cheng-ju
F	15	Lin Yi-huei
Position			Name/s
Head coach:			(South Korea) Chung Kwang-suk
			Chinese Taipei

=== Hong Kong ===
Pos.	No.	Player	Club
		Chan Cheung Man
		Fong Shing Yee
		Law Man Kwong
		Lee Kiu Fung
		Li Wai Lun
		Poon Chi Ho
		Siu Kim Wing
		Tam Wai Yeung
		Wong Chun Wai
		Wu Kwok Fung
Position			Name/s
Head coach:			(China) Yu Ming Chu
			Hong Kong

=== South Korea ===
Pos.	No.	Player	Club
		Cha Jae-young
		Ha Seung-jin	(United States) Anaheim Arsenal
		Kang Byang-hyun
		Kim Dong-woo
		Kim Seung-hyun
		Lee Kyu-sup
		Lee Dong-jun
		Shin Ki-sung
		Yang Dong-geun
		Yang Hae-jong
Position			Name/s
Head coach:			(South Korea) Choi Bu-young
			Korea

=== Syria ===
Pos.	No.	Player	Club
		Al Hakam Abd Allah Abd Allah
		Rami Al Katib Ali
		Mohammad Nour Alsaman Hazem
		Mhd-Charif Charif Abo Ulkarim
		Samir Daks Wahid
		Ahmad Hekmat Hadad Zourir
		Radwan Hasaballah Mohammad Saied
		Omar Karkoukli Moshen Lutfi
		Muhia Alden Kasballi Nour Elden
		Shadi Labes Haib
		Michael Madanly
		Wissam Yakoub Tamer
Position			Name/s
Head coach:			(Syria) Mohamed Abo Sada
			Syria
