= Basketball at the 2006 Asian Games – Men's tournament =

Men at the 2006 Asian Games
- Venue: Basketball Indoor Hall
- Date: 23 November – 15 December 2006
- Competitors: 239 from 20 nations

Medalists
gold medal	China
silver medal	Qatar
bronze medal	Iran

Men's basketball at the 2006 Asian Games was held in Doha from 23 November to 15 December 2006.

== Squads ==
Afghanistan	Bahrain	China	Chinese Taipei
Obaidullah Arghandiwal; Yousof Etemadi; Nafi Mashriqi; Farhad Nangialai; Sulaiman Aziz; Omar Sekandary; Habib Kabir; Khalid Kamal; Billal Azizi; Abdullah Karimi; Ali Amiri; Mohammad Abdul Roshan	Husain Taqi; Husain Shaker Al-Tawash; Sadeq Jaafar; Mahmood Ghuloom; Sayed Hashim Habib; Kadhem Majed; Ahmed Mirza; Yaser Bunafoor; Mohamed Qurban; Hani Alam; Ahmed Al-Mutawa; Ali Abbas Abdulnabi	Hu Xuefeng; Liu Wei; Zhang Jingsong; Wang Shipeng; Zhu Fangyu; Sun Yue; Li Nan; Yi Jianlian; Mo Ke; Tang Zhengdong; Wang Zhizhi; Li Ke	Wu Yung-jen; Yang Chin-min; Lee Hsueh-lin; Tseng Wen-ting; Yueh Ying-li; Yang Che-yi; Tien Lei; Lee Chi-yi; Lin Chih-chieh; Chen Shih-nien; Chen Hsin-an; Chou Shih-yuan
Hong Kong	India	Iran	Japan
Leung Chun Hung; Lo Yi Ting; Li Kim Wong; Lee Kiu Fung; Lau Chi Kin; Yung Man Tak; Li Ka Yiu; Cheng Kam Hing; Fong Shing Yee; Siu Kim Wing; Law Man Kwong; Wong Chun Wai	M. S. Sabeer Ahamed; Sambhaji Kadam; Ravikumar Krishnasamy; Anoop Mukkanniyil; Mihir Pandey; Trideep Rai; Sridhar Shanmugam; Subash J. Shenoy; Jagdeep Singh; Jasjot Singh; Damandeep Singh Teja; Riyaz Uddin	Pouya Tajik; Amir Amini; Saman Veisi; Mehdi Kamrani; Samad Nikkhah Bahrami; Iman Zandi; Hamed Afagh; Alireza Honardoust; Aidin Nikkhah Bahrami; Karam Ahmadian; Mousa Nabipour; Hamed Haddadi	Eric McArthur; Atsushi Ono; Ryota Sakurai; Kenichi Sako; Shinsuke Kashiwagi; Takehiko Orimo; Kosuke Takeuchi; Tomoo Amino; Takuma Watanabe; Fumihiko Aono; Shunsuke Ito; Joji Takeuchi
Jordan	Kazakhstan	Kuwait	Lebanon
Fadel Al-Najjar; Nedal Al-Sharif; Fadi Al-Saqqa; Zaid Abbas; Issa Kamel; Enver Soobzokov; Mousa Bashir; Wesam Al-Sous; Mohammad Hadrab; Zaid Al-Khas; Islam Abbas; Ayman Adais	Ivan Nechayev; Yegor Biryulin; Maxim Voyeikov; Vitaliy Lopatin; Alexandr Yemelyanov; Roman Muravyov; Andrey Shpekht; Anton Ponomarev; Yevgeniy Issakov; Rustam Yargaliyev; Mikhail Yevstigneyev; Dmitriy Korovnikov	Saqer Abdulredha; Shayee Mohanna; Sulaiman Al-Tabakh; Abdullah Al-Sarraf; Abdulaziz Al-Rabiah; Yahya Al-Bahar; Abdulaziz Dhari; Ahmad Al-Mutairi; Mohammad Ashkanani; Salem Al-Enezi; Rashed Al-Rabah; Osamah Farhan	Jean Abdelnour; Hussein Tawbe; Ali Mahmoud; Rony Fahed; Omar El-Turk; Mazen Mneimneh; Bassem Balaa; Joe Vogel; Mario Abboud; Sabah Khoury; Roy Samaha; Fadi El-Khatib
Macau	Mongolia	Palestine	Qatar
Chio Pit Ngai; Lu Chi Kin; Lok Kin Wai; Leong Chi Seng; Leong Ka Ioi; Wong Keng Long; Chang Kuok Wai; Chio Chi Wa; Wong Ka Fok; Lao Sio Fong; Wu Wai Hong; Lei Chin Pang	Baasangiin Ariunbold; Mönkhbayaryn Badrakh; Sainbayaryn Batbyamba; Ganbaataryn Ikhbayar; Shiinengiin Sedbazar; Batjargalyn Gankhölög; Oyuunbilegiin Sainbayar; Tsetsgeegiin Mergen; Batdorjiin Odbayar; Enkhboldyn Anar; Tserenjankharyn Sharavjamts	Ahmed Mussa; Hassan Ismail; Yahya Al-Khateeb; Shadi Al-Baz; Ahmed Al-Abdullah; Saleem Hussary; Ibrahim Habash; Ammar Nofal; Mohammed Al-Ghadban; Sani Sakakini; Iyad Yousef; Mohammed Sindeed	Khalid Masoud; Malek Saleem; Saad Abdulrahman; Daoud Musa; Khalid Suliman; Ali Turki; Yasseen Ismail; Erfan Ali Saeed; Mohammed Saleem; Mohammed Salaheldin; Hashim Zaidan; Omer Abdelqader
South Korea	Syria	United Arab Emirates	Uzbekistan
Kim Tae-sul; Kim Min-soo; Yang Dong-geun; Ha Seung-jin; Yang Hee-jong; Lee Kyu-sup; Bang Sung-yoon; Seo Jang-hoon; Song Young-jin; Kim Sung-chul; Kim Joo-sung; Kim Seung-hyun	Rami Al-Khatib; Ali Diarbakrly; Michael Madanly; Nour Al-Samman; Sharif Al-Sharif; Muhieddin Kasaballi; Bassel Raya; Radwan Hasaballah; Rober Bashayani; Salah Shawa; Firas Al-Masri; Wissam Yakoub	Jasim Abdulredha; Salem Mubarak; Ibrahim Khalfan; Ahmed Moosa; Talal Al-Nuaimi; Ayoub Ahmed; Khalifa Katoot; Qasem Mohamed; Rashed Al-Zaabi; Malalla Rashed; Ali Al-Hattawi; Rashed Salem	Timur Inileyev; Hurmatjon Nuraliev; Gennadiy Zinovev; Anton Martinenko; Viacheslav Denisov; Evgeniy Shatrov; Ruslan Abdurahmanov; Mikhail Shafenkov; Vyacheslav Belokurov; Aleksandr Kozlov; Sergey Kuchin; Andrey Tsiganenko

== Results ==
All times are Arabia Standard Time (UTC+03:00)

=== Round 1 ===
==== Group A ====
Pos	Team	Pld	W	L	PF	PA	PD	Pts	Qualification
1	Bahrain	2	2	0	111	56	+55	4	Preliminary
2	Macau	2	1	1	76	91	−15	3	
3	India	2	0	2	0	40	−40	0	

Source: Results

23 November
12:00

Bahrain	20–0	India
Forfeit

Basketball Indoor Hall, Doha
Attendance: 0
Referees: Mok Chi Hung (HKG), Jassim Mohamed (QAT)

24 November
14:00

Macau	56–91	Bahrain
Scoring by quarter: 17–26, 11–21, 11–24, 17–20
Pts: Leong K. 15; Rebs: Lei 13; Asts: Leong K., Lei 3		Pts: Ghuloom 30; Rebs: Al-Mutawa 9 Asts: Taqi 5

Basketball Indoor Hall, Doha
Attendance: 0
Referees: Mok Chi Hung (HKG), Abdullah Al-Sabti (KUW)

26 November
12:00

India	0–20	Macau
Forfeit

Basketball Indoor Hall, Doha
Attendance: 0

==== Group B ====
Pos	Team	Pld	W	L	PF	PA	PD	Pts	Qualification
1	Uzbekistan	2	2	0	180	126	+54	4	Preliminary
2	Mongolia	2	1	1	144	172	−28	3	
3	Palestine	2	0	2	130	156	−26	2	

Source: Results

23 November
14:15

Mongolia	66–102	Uzbekistan
Scoring by quarter: 15–35, 11–21, 24–27, 16–19
Pts: Badrakh 16; Rebs: Sedbazar 10; Asts: Ikhbayar 4		Pts: Kozlov 23; Rebs: Belokurov 8 Asts: Shatrov 9

Basketball Indoor Hall, Doha
Attendance: 60
Referees: Mozahem Hwig (SYR), Abdullah Al-Sabti (KUW)

24 November
16:15

Palestine	70–78	Mongolia
Scoring by quarter: 25–21, 11–16, 14–23, 20–18
Pts: Yousef 19; Rebs: Yousef 14; Asts: Hussary 6		Pts: Gankhölög 25; Rebs: Mergen 10; Asts: Ikhbayar 6

Basketball Indoor Hall, Doha
Attendance: 80
Referees: Hussain Al-Bloushi (UAE), Fadhel Jaffar (BRN)

26 November
14:15

Uzbekistan	78–60	Palestine
Scoring by quarter: 16–19, 21–12, 22–17, 19–12
Pts: Kozlov 20; Rebs: Kozlov 10; Asts: Belokurov 5		Pts: Yousef 17; Rebs: Yousef 15; Asts: Al-Baz, Sakakini, Yousef 1

Basketball Indoor Hall, Doha
Attendance: 35
Referees: Mozahem Hwig (SYR), Lei Weng Tim (MAC)

==== Group C ====
Pos	Team	Pld	W	L	PF	PA	PD	Pts	Qualification
1	Syria	2	2	0	173	127	+46	4	Preliminary
2	Afghanistan	2	1	1	131	141	−10	3	
3	Hong Kong	2	0	2	118	154	−36	2	

Source: Results

23 November
16:30

Afghanistan	65–57	Hong Kong
Scoring by quarter: 19–14, 15–19, 16–17, 15–7
Pts: Etemadi, Mashriqi 16; Rebs: Mashriqi 17; Asts: Etemadi, Nangialai, Karimi 2		Pts: Lee 13; Rebs: Fong 11; Asts: Lo 3

Basketball Indoor Hall, Doha
Attendance: 60
Referees: Mohammad Al-Amiri (KUW), Fadhel Jaffar (BRN)

24 November
18:30

Syria	84–66	Afghanistan
Scoring by quarter: 22–11, 21–20, 19–22, 22–13
Pts: Al-Sharif 23; Rebs: Hasaballah 16; Asts: Al-Sharif 6		Pts: Etemadi, Mashriqi 12; Rebs: Mashriqi 9 Asts: Karimi, Roshan 4

Basketball Indoor Hall, Doha
Attendance: 110
Referees: Yasser Abbas (QAT), Mohammad Al-Amiri (KUW)

26 November
16:30

Hong Kong	61–89	Syria
Scoring by quarter: 20–24, 12–8, 7–31, 22–26
Pts: Li K.W. 10; Rebs: Law, Wong 5 Asts: Leung 4		Pts: Al-Samman 22; Rebs: Yakoub 14; Asts: Madanly, Al-Sharif 4

Basketball Indoor Hall, Doha
Attendance: 60
Referees: Yasser Abbas (QAT), Hussain Al-Bloushi (UAE)

==== Group D ====
Pos	Team	Pld	W	L	PF	PA	PD	Pts	Qualification
1	Kazakhstan	2	2	0	191	147	+44	4	Preliminary
2	United Arab Emirates	2	1	1	151	161	−10	3	
3	Kuwait	2	0	2	148	182	−34	2	

Source: Results

23 November
18:45

United Arab Emirates	80–72	Kuwait
Scoring by quarter: 21–12, 16–23, 15–25, 28–12
Pts: Khalfan 22; Rebs: Al-Hattawi 7 Asts: Khalfan, Ahmed 2		Pts: Al-Sarraf 17; Rebs: Dhari 9 Asts: Al-Mutairi 3

Basketball Indoor Hall, Doha
Attendance: 60
Referees: Ravshan Ganiev (UZB), Payam Seifizadeh (IRI)

24 November
20:45

Kazakhstan	89–71	United Arab Emirates
Scoring by quarter: 22–18, 11–15, 26–22, 30–16
Pts: Ponomarev, Yargaliyev 23; Rebs: Ponomarev 19; Asts: Biryulin 4		Pts: Ahmed 28; Rebs: Khalfan, Ahmed 6 Asts: Al-Nuaimi 6

Basketball Indoor Hall, Doha
Attendance: 85
Referees: Ravshan Ganiev (UZB), Payam Seifizadeh (IRI)

26 November
18:45

Kuwait	76–102	Kazakhstan
Scoring by quarter: 21–33, 24–19, 19–20, 12–30
Pts: Al-Sarraf 19; Rebs: Farhan 6 Asts: Al-Sarraf, Al-Mutairi, Farhan 4		Pts: Yargaliyev 19; Rebs: Ponomarev 12; Asts: Nechayev 3

Basketball Indoor Hall, Doha
Attendance: 45
Referees: Ravshan Ganiev (UZB), Payam Seifizadeh (IRI)

=== Preliminary ===
==== Group E ====
Pos	Team	Pld	W	L	PF	PA	PD	Pts	Qualification
1	Qatar	5	4	1	426	327	+99	9 (Note: Head-to-head result: QAT 71–64 JOR.)	Quarterfinals
2	Jordan	5	4	1	349	300	+49	9	Quarterfinals
3	Iran	5	3	2	416	371	+45	8 (Note: Head-to-head result: IRI 89–75 KOR.)	Quarterfinals
4	South Korea	5	3	2	423	403	+20	8	Quarterfinals
5	Syria	5	1	4	383	436	−53	6	Classification 9th–12th
6	Bahrain	5	0	5	336	496	−160	5	Classification 9th–12th

Source: Results
Notes:

30 November
16:00

Iran	59–62	Jordan
Scoring by quarter: 13–16, 10–16, 19–17, 17–13
Pts: Afagh, Haddadi 13; Rebs: Haddadi 9 Asts: Veisi 6		Pts: Al-Sous 19; Rebs: Adais 10; Asts: Soobzokov 3

Basketball Indoor Hall, Doha
Attendance: 180
Referees: Tolga Sahin (ITA), Abdullah Al-Sabti (KUW)

30 November
18:15

South Korea	106–80	Bahrain
Scoring by quarter: 29–19, 25–22, 26–18, 26–21
Pts: Yang D. 20; Rebs: Ha 15; Asts: Kim S.H. 7		Pts: Al-Mutawa 27; Rebs: Al-Mutawa 16; Asts: Al-Tawash 4

Basketball Indoor Hall, Doha
Attendance: 200
Referees: Marwan Egho (LIB), Wu Chen-wu (TPE)

30 November
20:30

Qatar	99–59	Syria
Scoring by quarter: 26–17, 22–16, 21–19, 30–7
Pts: Ismail 16; Rebs: Ismail 12; Asts: Abdulrahman 7		Pts: Madanly 20; Rebs: Yakoub 13; Asts: Madanly, Yakoub 2

Basketball Indoor Hall, Doha
Attendance: 450
Referees: Aleksandr Gorshkov (RUS), Ravshan Ganiev (UZB)

3 December
16:00

Jordan	70–64	Syria
Scoring by quarter: 16–11, 17–14, 15–29, 22–10
Pts: Z. Abbas 18; Rebs: Adais 12; Asts: Soobzokov 4		Pts: Madanly 23; Rebs: Yakoub 12; Asts: Madanly 3

Basketball Indoor Hall, Doha
Attendance: 430
Referees: Tolga Sahin (ITA), Qiao Longshan (CHN)

3 December
18:15

South Korea	75–89	Iran
Scoring by quarter: 24–26, 16–12, 13–30, 22–21
Pts: Ha 14; Rebs: Yang D., Ha 8 Asts: Kim S.H. 8		Pts: Veisi 20; Rebs: Haddadi 13; Asts: five players 3

Basketball Indoor Hall, Doha
Attendance: 400
Referees: Aleksandr Gorshkov (RUS), Ravshan Ganiev (UZB)

3 December
20:30

Bahrain	56–97	Qatar
Scoring by quarter: 16–23, 15–26, 17–22, 8–26
Pts: Ghuloom, Al-Mutawa 13; Rebs: Mirza 6 Asts: Taqi 5		Pts: Ismail 16; Rebs: Mo. Saleem 13; Asts: four players 3

Basketball Indoor Hall, Doha
Attendance: 420
Referees: Nobuyasu Aibara (JPN), Zheng Jun (CHN)

5 December
15:00

Bahrain	77–112	Iran
Scoring by quarter: 23–23, 24–26, 17–33, 13–30
Pts: Ghuloom 23; Rebs: Al-Mutawa 10; Asts: Taqi 5		Pts: S. Nikkhah, Zandi 19; Rebs: Honardoust 10; Asts: Veisi 8

Basketball Indoor Hall, Doha
Attendance: 120
Referees: Wu Chen-wu (TPE), Marwan Egho (LIB)

5 December
17:15

Syria	85–93	South Korea
Scoring by quarter: 22–22, 24–27, 18–18, 21–26
Pts: Madanly 38; Rebs: Al-Masri 9 Asts: Al-Sharif 7		Pts: Kim J. 20; Rebs: Kim M. 9 Asts: Yang D. 7

Basketball Indoor Hall, Doha
Attendance: 520
Referees: Tolga Sahin (ITA), Abdullah Al-Sabti (KUW)

5 December
19:30

Qatar	71–64	Jordan
Scoring by quarter: 12–14, 20–6, 24–17, 15–27
Pts: Saeed 20; Rebs: Saeed, Abdelqader 8 Asts: Musa, Suliman 4		Pts: Al-Khas 19; Rebs: Al-Khas, Soobzokov 9 Asts: Soobzokov 3

Basketball Indoor Hall, Doha
Attendance: 750
Referees: Aleksandr Gorshkov (RUS), Ravshan Ganiev (UZB)

7 December
15:00

Bahrain	79–96	Syria
Scoring by quarter: 12–21, 22–18, 21–24, 24–33
Pts: Ghuloom 34; Rebs: Al-Mutawa 14; Asts: Ghuloom 4		Pts: Madanly 27; Rebs: Hasaballah 12; Asts: Madanly, Al-Sharif 5

Basketball Indoor Hall, Doha
Attendance: 200
Referees: Kim Young-woo (KOR), Nobuyasu Aibara (JPN)

7 December
17:15

Jordan	68–62	South Korea
Scoring by quarter: 16–10, 15–12, 17–17, 20–23
Pts: Al-Khas 17; Rebs: Al-Khas 9 Asts: Kamel, Al-Sous, Al-Khas 2		Pts: Yang D. 18; Rebs: Kim M., Seo 7 Asts: Kim S.H. 3

Basketball Indoor Hall, Doha
Attendance: 620
Referees: Tolga Sahin (ITA), Qiao Longshan (CHN)

7 December
19:30

Iran	61–78	Qatar
Scoring by quarter: 11–21, 11–20, 25–21, 14–16
Pts: S. Nikkhah 15; Rebs: Afagh, Nabipour, Haddadi 6 Asts: Zandi 3		Pts: Abdulrahman 16; Rebs: Ismail, Saeed 9 Asts: Musa 7

Basketball Indoor Hall, Doha
Attendance: 850
Referees: Aleksandr Gorshkov (RUS), Marwan Egho (LIB)

9 December
15:00

Jordan	85–44	Bahrain
Scoring by quarter: 22–6, 25–15, 12–4, 26–19
Pts: Hadrab 13; Rebs: Hadrab 14; Asts: Kamel 4		Pts: Taqi 12; Rebs: Qurban, Alam 6 Asts: Al-Tawash, Majed, Alam 1

Basketball Indoor Hall, Doha
Attendance: 350
Referees: Qiao Longshan (CHN), Nobuyasu Aibara (JPN)

9 December
17:15

Syria	79–95	Iran
Scoring by quarter: 17–29, 30–23, 21–29, 11–14
Pts: Madanly 29; Rebs: Al-Masri 10; Asts: Al-Samman, Al-Sharif 4		Pts: S. Nikkhah 34; Rebs: Haddadi 14; Asts: Kamrani 7

Basketball Indoor Hall, Doha
Attendance: 690
Referees: Abdullah Al-Sabti (KUW), Wu Chen-wu (TPE)

9 December
19:30

Qatar	81–87 (OT)	South Korea
Scoring by quarter: 15–12, 16–15, 19–23, 21–21, Overtime: 10–16
Pts: Abdulrahman, Abdelqader 17; Rebs: Abdelqader 8 Asts: Ma. Saleem, Musa, Ismail 3		Pts: Bang 42; Rebs: Ha 12; Asts: Yang D., Yang H. 5

Basketball Indoor Hall, Doha
Attendance: 1,000
Referees: Aleksandr Gorshkov (RUS), Ravshan Ganiev (UZB)

==== Group F ====
Pos	Team	Pld	W	L	PF	PA	PD	Pts	Qualification
1	China	5	5	0	450	351	+99	10	Quarterfinals
2	Japan	5	3	2	378	369	+9	8 (Note: Tied on head-to-head wins (1). Head-to-head game points average: JPN 1.033, KAZ 1.020, TPE 0.951.)	Quarterfinals
3	Kazakhstan	5	3	2	413	394	+19	8	Quarterfinals
4	Chinese Taipei	5	3	2	413	406	+7	8	Quarterfinals
5	Lebanon	5	1	4	393	389	+4	6	Classification 9th–12th
6	Uzbekistan	5	0	5	340	478	−138	5	Classification 9th–12th

Source: Results
Notes:

2 December
16:00

Japan	85–75	Chinese Taipei
Scoring by quarter: 23–23, 18–19, 23–13, 21–20
Pts: Kashiwagi 16; Rebs: McArthur 10; Asts: J. Takeuchi 4		Pts: Chen H. 24; Rebs: Tien 16; Asts: Lin 4

Basketball Indoor Hall, Doha
Attendance: 400
Referees: Tolga Sahin (ITA), Payam Seifizadeh (IRI)

2 December
18:15

Lebanon	106–70	Uzbekistan
Scoring by quarter: 36–10, 31–18, 21–20, 18–22
Pts: El-Khatib 34; Rebs: Vogel 10; Asts: Fahed 6		Pts: Kozlov 14; Rebs: Shafenkov 10; Asts: Shatrov 4

Basketball Indoor Hall, Doha
Attendance: 740
Referees: Yasser Abbas (QAT), Lee Yong-kun (KOR)

2 December
20:30

China	89–77	Kazakhstan
Scoring by quarter: 29–20, 19–17, 22–23, 19–17
Pts: Wang Z. 22; Rebs: Yi 6 Asts: Wang S. 3		Pts: Korovnikov 22; Rebs: Issakov 8 Asts: Biryulin 4

Basketball Indoor Hall, Doha
Attendance: 600
Referees: Aleksandr Gorshkov (RUS), Mozahem Hwig (SYR)

4 December
15:00

Chinese Taipei	81–79	Kazakhstan
Scoring by quarter: 23–17, 14–16, 23–24, 21–22
Pts: Chen H. 24; Rebs: Tseng 14; Asts: Lee H. 8		Pts: Korovnikov 19; Rebs: Korovnikov 8 Asts: Biryulin 4

Basketball Indoor Hall, Doha
Attendance: 150
Referees: Tolga Sahin (ITA), Reza Javadi (IRI)

4 December
17:15

Lebanon	67–78	Japan
Scoring by quarter: 18–28, 18–13, 14–21, 17–16
Pts: Vogel 24; Rebs: Vogel 10; Asts: El-Khatib 3		Pts: Orimo 23; Rebs: K. Takeuchi 9 Asts: four players 2

Basketball Indoor Hall, Doha
Attendance: 880
Referees: Aleksandr Gorshkov (RUS), Abdullah Al-Sabti (KUW)

4 December
19:30

Uzbekistan	68–91	China
Scoring by quarter: 21–30, 6–14, 22–18, 19–29
Pts: Kozlov 24; Rebs: Kuchin 7 Asts: Shatrov 4		Pts: Sun 22; Rebs: Yi 8 Asts: Hu, Liu 3

Basketball Indoor Hall, Doha
Attendance: 300
Referees: Naser Abu Rashed (JOR), Fadhel Jaffar (BRN)

6 December
15:00

Uzbekistan	56–75	Japan
Scoring by quarter: 16–20, 11–21, 19–19, 10–15
Pts: Shafenkov 21; Rebs: Shatrov 7 Asts: Shatrov 11		Pts: Orimo 17; Rebs: K. Takeuchi 12; Asts: Kashiwagi 7

Basketball Indoor Hall, Doha
Attendance: 100
Referees: Payam Seifizadeh (IRI), Jasem Nathar (QAT)

6 December
17:15

Kazakhstan	80–75	Lebanon
Scoring by quarter: 17–18, 21–23, 27–19, 15–15
Pts: Ponomarev 27; Rebs: Ponomarev 16; Asts: Biryulin 5		Pts: El-Khatib 34; Rebs: El-Khatib 13; Asts: Mahmoud 5

Basketball Indoor Hall, Doha
Attendance: 890
Referees: Lee Yong-kun (KOR), Reza Javadi (IRI)

6 December
19:30

China	101–65	Chinese Taipei
Scoring by quarter: 24–23, 28–10, 28–13, 21–19
Pts: Yi 28; Rebs: Yi 9 Asts: Liu 5		Pts: Lin, Chen H. 14; Rebs: Lee H., Tseng, Lee C. 3 Asts: Chou 2

Basketball Indoor Hall, Doha
Attendance: 500
Referees: Abdullah Al-Sabti (KUW), Yasser Abbas (QAT)

8 December
15:00

Uzbekistan	77–100	Kazakhstan
Scoring by quarter: 19–24, 23–39, 22–14, 13–23
Pts: Shafenkov 20; Rebs: Shafenkov, Kozlov 6 Asts: Shatrov 7		Pts: Korovnikov 22; Rebs: Yemelyanov 12; Asts: Yargaliyev 6

Basketball Indoor Hall, Doha
Attendance: 150
Referees: Mozahem Hwig (SYR), Fadhel Jaffar (BRN)

8 December
17:15

Chinese Taipei	86–72	Lebanon
Scoring by quarter: 28–15, 22–18, 20–19, 16–20
Pts: Tseng 21; Rebs: Tien 14; Asts: Chen H. 5		Pts: Vogel 20; Rebs: Vogel 9 Asts: Mahmoud 7

Basketball Indoor Hall, Doha
Attendance: 960
Referees: Tolga Sahin (ITA), Yasser Abbas (QAT)

8 December
19:30

Japan	68–94	China
Scoring by quarter: 14–27, 24–27, 18–16, 12–24
Pts: Sakurai 18; Rebs: Ito 5 Asts: Kashiwagi 5		Pts: Wang Z. 30; Rebs: Wang Z. 14; Asts: Liu, Wang S. 5

Basketball Indoor Hall, Doha
Attendance: 1,610
Referees: Aleksandr Gorshkov (RUS), Naser Abu Rashed (JOR)

10 December
16:00

Chinese Taipei	106–69	Uzbekistan
Scoring by quarter: 20–16, 29–31, 27–13, 30–9
Pts: Tien 22; Rebs: Tseng 8 Asts: Lin 6		Pts: Belokurov 20; Rebs: Shatrov 6 Asts: Shatrov 3

Basketball Indoor Hall, Doha
Attendance: 200
Referees: Lee Yong-kun (KOR), Damrongkiat Mungkit (THA)

10 December
18:15

Kazakhstan	77–72	Japan
Scoring by quarter: 17–20, 20–9, 19–22, 21–21
Pts: Ponomarev 18; Rebs: Ponomarev 11; Asts: Yargaliyev 3		Pts: K. Takeuchi 16; Rebs: J. Takeuchi 13; Asts: Sako, K. Takeuchi 5

Basketball Indoor Hall, Doha
Attendance: 515
Referees: Tolga Sahin (ITA), Chantal Julien (FRA)

10 December
20:30

China	75–73	Lebanon
Scoring by quarter: 20–16, 15–18, 26–17, 14–22
Pts: Wang Z. 20; Rebs: Wang Z. 14; Asts: Hu 4		Pts: Fahed 27; Rebs: Vogel 10; Asts: Fahed 4

Basketball Indoor Hall, Doha
Attendance: 1,450
Referees: Abdullah Al-Sabti (KUW), Mozahem Hwig (SYR)

=== Classification 9th–12th ===
Classification 9th–12th
13 December
Bahrain	65
Lebanon	90
13 December
Uzbekistan	104
Syria	111

Classification 9th–10th
14 December
Lebanon	88
Syria	82
Classification 11th–12th
14 December
Bahrain	73
Uzbekistan	92

==== Semifinals ====
13 December
9:00

Bahrain	65–90	Lebanon
Scoring by quarter: 17–28, 14–18, 22–26, 12–18
Pts: Bunafoor 23; Rebs: Qurban 8 Asts: Bunafoor 3		Pts: Samaha 19; Rebs: Samaha 20; Asts: Fahed 7

Basketball Indoor Hall, Doha
Attendance: 173
Referees: Zheng Jun (CHN), Yoji Fujigaki (JPN)

13 December
11:15

Uzbekistan	104–111	Syria
Scoring by quarter: 28–32, 19–21, 26–31, 31–27
Pts: Shafenkov 31; Rebs: Kozlov 8 Asts: Shatrov 7		Pts: Madanly 34; Rebs: Hasaballah 13; Asts: Madanly 10

Basketball Indoor Hall, Doha
Attendance: 112
Referees: Kim Young-woo (KOR), Reza Javadi (IRI)

==== Classification 11th–12th ====
14 December
9:00

Bahrain	73–92	Uzbekistan
Scoring by quarter: 19–26, 24–20, 11–24, 19–22
Pts: Ghuloom 20; Rebs: Qurban 11; Asts: Taqi 5		Pts: Kozlov 25; Rebs: Shafenkov 15; Asts: Belokurov 5

Basketball Indoor Hall, Doha
Attendance: 132
Referees: Lee Yong-kun (KOR), Yoji Fujigaki (JPN)

==== Classification 9th–10th ====
14 December
11:15

Lebanon	88–82	Syria
Scoring by quarter: 12–22, 27–21, 32–16, 17–23
Pts: Vogel 31; Rebs: Tawbe 17; Asts: Mahmoud 13		Pts: Madanly 23; Rebs: Yakoub 17; Asts: Al-Sharif, Hasaballah 6

Basketball Indoor Hall, Doha
Attendance: 612
Referees: Wu Chen-wu (TPE), Jasem Nathar (QAT)

=== Final round ===
Quarterfinals
12 December
Jordan (OT)	99
Kazakhstan	91
12 December
China	68
South Korea	52
12 December
Iran	68
Japan	64
12 December
Qatar (2OT)	103
Chinese Taipei	96

Semifinals
13 December
Jordan	58
China	86
13 December
Iran	64
Qatar	67

Gold medal match
15 December
China	59
Qatar	44
Bronze medal match
15 December
Jordan	78
Iran	84

Classification 5th–8th
13 December
Japan	78
Chinese Taipei	67
13 December
Kazakhstan	74
South Korea	94

Classification 5th–6th
14 December
Japan	76
South Korea	87
Classification 7th–8th
14 December
Chinese Taipei	74
Kazakhstan	100

==== Quarterfinals ====
12 December
10:00

Iran	68–64	Japan
Scoring by quarter: 11–13, 22–12, 19–22, 16–17
Pts: Kamrani, S. Nikkhah 14; Rebs: Haddadi 15; Asts: Kamrani, Haddadi 3		Pts: Sakurai 14; Rebs: Aono 10; Asts: Kashiwagi 5

Basketball Indoor Hall, Doha
Attendance: 700
Referees: Abdullah Al-Sabti (KUW), Fadhel Jaffar (BRN)

12 December
12:15

Jordan	99–91 (OT)	Kazakhstan
Scoring by quarter: 24–20, 18–12, 19–24, 21–26, Overtime: 17–9
Pts: Al-Khas 30; Rebs: Al-Khas 11; Asts: Al-Khas 5		Pts: Yargaliyev 26; Rebs: Ponomarev 11; Asts: Biryulin 4

Basketball Indoor Hall, Doha
Attendance: 650
Referees: Mozahem Hwig (SYR), Damrongkiat Mungkit (THA)

12 December
17:00

China	68–52	South Korea
Scoring by quarter: 19–13, 22–12, 8–12, 19–15
Pts: Yi 18; Rebs: Yi 14; Asts: Wang S., Mo 3		Pts: Ha 16; Rebs: Ha 16; Asts: Kim S.H. 3

Basketball Indoor Hall, Doha
Attendance: 803
Referees: Tolga Sahin (ITA), Ravshan Ganiev (UZB)

12 December
19:15

Qatar	103–96 (2OT)	Chinese Taipei
Scoring by quarter: 18–25, 20–16, 23–25, 20–15, Overtime: 11–11, 11–4
Pts: Saeed 27; Rebs: Saeed 15; Asts: Turki 4		Pts: Chen H. 24; Rebs: Tien 19; Asts: Lee H., Chen H. 5

Basketball Indoor Hall, Doha
Attendance: 1,178
Referees: Chantal Julien (FRA), Marwan Egho (LIB)

==== Classification 5th–8th ====
13 December
14:00

Japan	78–67	Chinese Taipei
Scoring by quarter: 27–12, 12–14, 20–17, 19–24
Pts: Amino 15; Rebs: K. Takeuchi 14; Asts: Sako 4		Pts: Chen H. 14; Rebs: Tien 13; Asts: Chou 3

Basketball Indoor Hall, Doha
Attendance: 112
Referees: Naser Abu Rashed (JOR), Payam Seifizadeh (IRI)

13 December
16:15

Kazakhstan	74–94	South Korea
Scoring by quarter: 22–25, 12–24, 21–22, 19–23
Pts: Yargaliyev 20; Rebs: Issakov 10; Asts: Nechayev, Voyeikov 3		Pts: Kim J. 22; Rebs: Yang H. 10; Asts: Kim S.H. 8

Basketball Indoor Hall, Doha
Attendance: 304
Referees: Yasser Abbas (QAT), Marwan Egho (LIB)

==== Semifinals ====
13 December
19:00

Jordan	58–86	China
Scoring by quarter: 26–21, 6–20, 10–23, 16–22
Pts: Al-Khas 27; Rebs: I. Abbas 12; Asts: I. Abbas 3		Pts: Wang Z. 20; Rebs: Yi 10; Asts: four players 3

Basketball Indoor Hall, Doha
Attendance: 1,200
Referees: Tolga Sahin (ITA), Abdullah Al-Sabti (KUW)

13 December
21:15

Iran	64–67	Qatar
Scoring by quarter: 16–9, 9–15, 18–29, 21–14
Pts: Kamrani 18; Rebs: Kamrani, Honardoust, Haddadi 8 Asts: Honardoust 4		Pts: Abdulrahman 23; Rebs: Abdelqader 10; Asts: Ismail 3

Basketball Indoor Hall, Doha
Attendance: 1,200
Referees: Ravshan Ganiev (UZB), Nobuyasu Aibara (JPN)

==== Classification 7th–8th ====
14 December
14:00

Chinese Taipei	74–100	Kazakhstan
Scoring by quarter: 19–23, 13–25, 19–24, 23–28
Pts: Chou 17; Rebs: Tseng 6 Asts: Chen S., Chen H. 4		Pts: Ponomarev 25; Rebs: Yevstigneyev 16; Asts: Yargaliyev 7

Basketball Indoor Hall, Doha
Attendance: 231
Referees: Mozahem Hwig (SYR), Fadhel Jaffar (BRN)

==== Classification 5th–6th ====
14 December
16:15

Japan	76–87	South Korea
Scoring by quarter: 19–27, 10–22, 27–17, 20–21
Pts: Sakurai 18; Rebs: K. Takeuchi 11; Asts: Aono 3		Pts: Kim J. 30; Rebs: Kim J. 9 Asts: Kim S.H. 7

Basketball Indoor Hall, Doha
Attendance: 490
Referees: Qiao Longshan (CHN), Abdullah Al-Sabti (KUW)

==== Bronze medal match ====
15 December
11:00

Jordan	78–84	Iran
Scoring by quarter: 16–21, 16–22, 24–24, 22–17
Pts: I. Abbas 21; Rebs: Adais 10; Asts: Al-Saqqa 4		Pts: Kamrani 19; Rebs: Haddadi 9 Asts: S. Nikkhah, Honardoust 7

Basketball Indoor Hall, Doha
Attendance: 790
Referees: Abdullah Al-Sabti (KUW), Zheng Jun (CHN)

==== Gold medal match ====
15 December
13:30

China	59–44	Qatar
Scoring by quarter: 20–15, 14–10, 13–14, 12–5
Pts: Wang Z. 28; Rebs: Yi 15; Asts: four players 2		Pts: Abdelqader 16; Rebs: Abdelqader 15; Asts: Abdulrahman, Ismail 2

Basketball Indoor Hall, Doha
Attendance: 1,800
Referees: Tolga Sahin (ITA), Ravshan Ganiev (UZB)

== Final standing ==
Rank	Team	Pld	W	L
1st place, gold medalist(s)	China	8	8	0
2nd place, silver medalist(s)	Qatar	8	6	2
3rd place, bronze medalist(s)	Iran	8	5	3
4	Jordan	8	5	3
5	South Korea	8	5	3
6	Japan	8	4	4
7	Kazakhstan	10	6	4
8	Chinese Taipei	8	3	5
9	Lebanon	7	3	4
10	Syria	9	4	5
11	Uzbekistan	9	3	6
12	Bahrain	9	2	7
13	Afghanistan	2	1	1
13	Macau	2	1	1
13	Mongolia	2	1	1
13	United Arab Emirates	2	1	1
17	Hong Kong	2	0	2
17	India	2	0	2
17	Kuwait	2	0	2
17	Palestine	2	0	2
