= 2008 WABA Champions Cup =

The WABA Champions Cup 2008 was the 11th staging of the WABA Champions Cup, the basketball club tournament of West Asia Basketball Association. The tournament was held in Mahshahr, Iran between March 9 and March 15. The top three teams from different countries qualify for the FIBA Asia Champions Cup 2008.

== Preliminary round ==
=== Group A ===
Team	Pld	W	L	PF	PA	PD	Pts
(Iran) Saba Battery Tehran	3	3	0	277	184	+93	6
(Iran) Petrochimi Bandar Imam	3	2	1	244	223	+21	5
(Jordan) Orthodox	3	1	2	223	229	−6	4
(Yemen) Al-Ahli	3	0	3	181	289	−108	3

March 9
14:00

Saba Battery Tehran (Iran)	89–65	(Jordan) Orthodox
Scoring by quarter: 24−14, 18−13, 25−16, 22−22

Andisheh Arena, Mahshahr

March 9
16:45

Al-Ahli (Yemen)	65–101	(Iran) Petrochimi Bandar Imam
Scoring by quarter: 16−30, 7−26, 19−22, 23−23

Andisheh Arena, Mahshahr

March 10
14:00

Al-Ahli (Yemen)	60–109	(Iran) Saba Battery Tehran
Scoring by quarter: 14−32, 13−22, 17−35, 16−20

Andisheh Arena, Mahshahr

March 10
18:00

Petrochimi Bandar Imam (Iran)	84–79	(Jordan) Orthodox
Scoring by quarter: 24−21, 12−16, 17−21, 31−21

Andisheh Arena, Mahshahr

March 11
14:00

Orthodox (Jordan)	79–56	(Yemen) Al-Ahli
Scoring by quarter: 18−16, 24−10, 18−10, 19−20

Andisheh Arena, Mahshahr

March 11
18:00

Petrochimi Bandar Imam (Iran)	59–79	(Iran) Saba Battery Tehran
Scoring by quarter: 16−19, 17−20, 14−23, 12−17

Andisheh Arena, Mahshahr

=== Group B ===
Team	Pld	W	L	PF	PA	PD	Pts
(Lebanon) Al-Riyadi Beirut	3	3	0	272	190	+82	6
(Jordan) Zain	3	2	1	210	205	+5	5
(Syria) Al-Ittihad Aleppo	3	1	2	210	227	−17	4
(Iraq) Al-Hillah	3	0	3	184	254	−70	3

March 9
18:45

Al-Ittihad Aleppo (Syria)	70–60	(Iraq) Al-Hillah
Scoring by quarter: 13−12, 25−22, 20−12, 12−14

Andisheh Arena, Mahshahr

March 9
20:45

Zain (Jordan)	65–66	(Lebanon) Al-Riyadi Beirut
Scoring by quarter: 22−22, 16−13, 14−13, 13−18

Andisheh Arena, Mahshahr

March 10
16:00

Al-Hillah (Iraq)	55–110	(Lebanon) Al-Riyadi Beirut
Scoring by quarter: 17−33, 13−27, 10−33, 15−17

Andisheh Arena, Mahshahr

March 10
20:00

Al-Ittihad Aleppo (Syria)	70–71 (2OT)	(Jordan) Zain
Scoring by quarter: 12−15, 8−13, 13−10, 19−14, Overtime: 9−9, 9−10

Andisheh Arena, Mahshahr

March 11
16:00

Al-Hillah (Iraq)	69–74	(Jordan) Zain
Scoring by quarter: 15−20, 11−28, 22−7, 21−19

Andisheh Arena, Mahshahr

March 11
20:00

Al-Riyadi Beirut (Lebanon)	96–70	(Syria) Al-Ittihad Aleppo
Scoring by quarter: 24−18, 21−15, 26−16, 25−21

Andisheh Arena, Mahshahr

== Final round ==
Quarterfinals
March 12
(Iran) Saba Battery	122
(Iraq) Al-Hillah	51
March 12
(Jordan) Zain	71
(Jordan) Orthodox	63
March 12
(Iran) Petrochimi	77
(Syria) Al-Ittihad	59
March 12
(Lebanon) Al-Riyadi	94
(Yemen) Al-Ahli	61

Semifinals
March 13
(Iran) Saba Battery	112
(Jordan) Zain	77
March 13
(Iran) Petrochimi	61
(Lebanon) Al-Riyadi	73

Final
March 15
(Iran) Saba Battery	82
(Lebanon) Al-Riyadi (OT)	83
3rd place
March 15
(Jordan) Zain	60
(Iran) Petrochimi	70

Semifinals
March 13
(Iraq) Al-Hillah	60
(Jordan) Orthodox	73
March 13
(Syria) Al-Ittihad	71
(Yemen) Al-Ahli	64

5th place
March 15
(Jordan) Orthodox	70
(Syria) Al-Ittihad	66
7th place
March 15
(Iraq) Al-Hillah	73
(Yemen) Al-Ahli	88

=== Quarterfinals ===
March 12
14:00

Saba Battery Tehran (Iran)	122–51	(Iraq) Al-Hillah
Scoring by quarter: 37−12, 24−10, 28−9, 33−20
Pts: Baheran 17; Rebs: Kardoust 13; Asts: Baheran 6		Pts: Hamzah 21; Rebs: Suliman 5 Asts: Gayden 2

Andisheh Arena, Mahshahr

March 12
16:00

Al-Riyadi Beirut (Lebanon)	94–61	(Yemen) Al-Ahli
Scoring by quarter: 29−23, 29−9, 13−18, 23−11
Pts: Mneinmeh 18; Rebs: Fakhreddine 25; Asts: Ahmed 9		Pts: Al-Assari 18; Rebs: Al-Assari, S. Sadaqah, Diop 6 Asts: Al-Assari, Al-Sanabani 2

Andisheh Arena, Mahshahr

March 12
18:00

Petrochimi Bandar Imam (Iran)	77–59	(Syria) Al-Ittihad Aleppo
Scoring by quarter: 19−16, 22−22, 19−11, 17−10
Pts: Davari 24; Rebs: Long 10; Asts: Davari 5		Pts: Washington 14; Rebs: Washington 10; Asts: Diarbakrly 2

Andisheh Arena, Mahshahr

March 12
20:00

Zain (Jordan)	71–63	(Jordan) Orthodox
Scoring by quarter: 10−22, 16−16, 20−17, 25−8
Pts: Al-Khas 23; Rebs: Samake 14; Asts: Four players 2		Pts: Adais 16; Rebs: Adais 12; Asts: Al-Naber, Campbell 4

Andisheh Arena, Mahshahr

=== Semifinals 5th–8th ===
March 13
14:00

Al-Hillah (Iraq)	60–73	(Jordan) Orthodox
Scoring by quarter: 16−18, 17−14, 13−20, 14−21
Pts: Gayden 17; Rebs: Abid 8 Asts: Attiyah 6		Pts: Adais 24; Rebs: Adais 17; Asts: Adais 5

Andisheh Arena, Mahshahr

March 13
16:00

Al-Ittihad Aleppo (Syria)	71–64	(Yemen) Al-Ahli
Scoring by quarter: 12−11, 22−21, 17−18, 20−14
Pts: Shawa 15; Rebs: Shawa, Al-Masri 9 Asts: Al-Hasan, Kassas 3		Pts: Al-Assari 31; Rebs: Diop 12; Asts: Al-Assari, Al-Mashraqi, Al-Khulaidi 1

Andisheh Arena, Mahshahr

=== Semifinals ===
March 13
18:00

Petrochimi Bandar Imam (Iran)	61–73	(Lebanon) Al-Riyadi Beirut
Scoring by quarter: 17−16, 10−16, 15−23, 19−18
Pts: Madison 32; Rebs: Long 14; Asts: Sohrabnejad 3		Pts: El Khatib 25; Rebs: Ahmed 14; Asts: Mahmoud, Ahmed 4

Andisheh Arena, Mahshahr

March 13
20:00

Saba Battery Tehran (Iran)	112–77	(Jordan) Zain
Scoring by quarter: 23−30, 31−17, 28−13, 30−17
Pts: Sneed 36; Rebs: Haddadi 15; Asts: Jones 7		Pts: Johnson 20; Rebs: Samake 8 Asts: Al-Khas 3

Andisheh Arena, Mahshahr

=== 7th place ===
March 15
11:00

Al-Hillah (Iraq)	73–88	(Yemen) Al-Ahli
Scoring by quarter: 18−26, 12−28, 23−9, 20−25
Pts: Hamzah 18; Rebs: Abid 10; Asts: Gbayan 5		Pts: Al-Assari 34; Rebs: Abdulghafor 12; Asts: Abdulghafor, S. Sadaqah 2

Andisheh Arena, Mahshahr

=== 5th place ===
March 15
13:00

Orthodox (Jordan)	70–66	(Syria) Al-Ittihad Aleppo
Scoring by quarter: 20−17, 20−18, 17−13, 13−18
Pts: Campbell 20; Rebs: Wise 18; Asts: Al-Naber 3		Pts: Joseph 24; Rebs: Washington 13; Asts: Shawa 3

Andisheh Arena, Mahshahr

=== 3rd place ===
March 15
15:00

Zain (Jordan)	60–70	(Iran) Petrochimi Bandar Imam
Scoring by quarter: 17−18, 10−15, 16−19, 17−18
Pts: Abbas 21; Rebs: Samake 20; Asts: Al-Saqa, Al-Awadi 4		Pts: Madison 23; Rebs: Sohrabnejad 8 Asts: Madison 5

Andisheh Arena, Mahshahr

=== Final ===
March 15
17:00

Saba Battery Tehran (Iran)	82–83 (OT)	(Lebanon) Al-Riyadi Beirut
Scoring by quarter: 18−17, 18−15, 21−25, 20−20, Overtime: 5−6
Pts: Afagh 23; Rebs: Haddadi 14; Asts: Jones 5		Pts: Ahmed 24; Rebs: Vogel 13; Asts: El Khatib 4

Andisheh Arena, Mahshahr

== Final standing ==
Rank	Team	Record
1st place, gold medalist(s)	(Lebanon) Al-Riyadi Beirut	6−0
2nd place, silver medalist(s)	(Iran) Saba Battery Tehran	5−1
3rd place, bronze medalist(s)	(Iran) Petrochimi Bandar Imam	4−2
4	(Jordan) Zain	3−3
5	(Jordan) Orthodox	3−3
6	(Syria) Al-Ittihad Aleppo	2−4
7	(Yemen) Al-Ahli	1−5
8	(Iraq) Al-Hillah	0−6
