= 2007 FIBA Asia Championship =

2007年バスケットボール男子アジア選手権

Tournament details
- Host country: Japan
- City: Tokushima
- Dates: July 28 – August 5
- Teams: 16
- Venues: 2 (in 1 host city)

Final positions
- Champions: Iran (1st title)
- Runners-up: Lebanon
- Third place: South Korea
- Fourth place: Kazakhstan

Tournament statistics
- MVP: (Iran) Hamed Haddadi
- Top scorer: (Syria) Michael Madanly (33.1 points per game)

The 2007 FIBA Asia Championship for Men was the qualifying tournament for FIBA Asia at the men's basketball tournament at the 2008 Summer Olympics at Beijing. The tournament was held in Tokushima, Japan from July 28 to August 5, 2007.

Participating teams qualified through the previous edition of this tournament and others through regional qualifiers. Since China was assured of an automatic berth at the 2008 Olympics as the host nation, the champions will automatically qualify while the two best teams excluding China qualifies for the 2008 FIBA World Olympic Qualifying Tournament for Men. This resulted in China deploying another team in this tournament, while their primary team led by NBA star Yao Ming and rookie Yi Jianlian participated in the Stankovic Cup and tournaments and friendlies with countries across Europe to prepare themselves.

Iran won their first championship after beating 2-time silver medalists Lebanon, 74–69. Korea upended Kazakhstan to clinch third place, and the last Asian berth in the FIBA pre-Olympic tournament, together with Lebanon.

== Qualification ==
According to the FIBA Asia rules, each zone had two places, and the hosts (Japan) and holders (China) were automatically qualified. The other four places are allocated to the zones according to performance in the 2005 FIBA Asia Championship.

East Asia (2+2+1)	Gulf (2+1)	Middle Asia (2)	Southeast Asia (2)	West Asia (2+2)
Japan	Qatar	Kazakhstan	Philippines	Iran
China	Saudi Arabia	India	Indonesia	Jordan
Chinese Taipei	United Arab Emirates			Lebanon
Hong Kong				Syria
South Korea				

== Draw ==
The draw was held on June 6 at Tokushima. The teams were grouped first into four pots, each member of the pot is guaranteed not to face each other in the preliminary round; the top four finishers of 2005 FIBA Asia Championship are seeded in order of their finish and hence are on one pot. Japan as the host has the right to choose which group it will be under.

Group A	Group B	Group C	Group D
China; Jordan; Iran; Philippines	Lebanon; ~~Saudi Arabia~~ * United Arab Emirates; Japan	Qatar; India; Kazakhstan; Indonesia	South Korea; Hong Kong; Syria; Chinese Taipei

* Saudi Arabia withdrew from the tournament, Kuwait replaced them.

== Preliminary round ==
=== Group A ===
Team	Pld	W	L	PF	PA	PD	Pts
Iran	3	3	0	212	191	+21	6
Jordan	3	2	1	216	201	+15	5
Philippines	3	1	2	224	233	−9	4
China	3	0	3	207	234	−27	3

July 28
11:15

Report

China	65–78	Jordan
Scoring by quarter: 18–17, 12–18, 19–25, 16–18
Pts: Yang M., Wang B. 15; Rebs: Zhang K. 7 Asts: Yang M. 3		Pts: Wright 31; Rebs: I. Abbas 17; Asts: Daghlas 4

Asty Tokushima, Tokushima

July 28
18:00

Report

Iran	75–69	Philippines
Scoring by quarter: 19–14, 11–11, 21–11, 24–33
Pts: S. Nikkhah 25; Rebs: Davari 8 Asts: Davari 2		Pts: Raymundo 15; Rebs: Taulava 8 Asts: Four players 1

Asty Tokushima, Tokushima

July 29
18:00

Report

Philippines	79–74	China
Scoring by quarter: 19–25, 19–24, 18–8, 23–17
Pts: Alapag 25; Rebs: Williams 9 Asts: Alapag 3		Pts: Yi L., Wang B. 14; Rebs: Yi L., Li K. 5 Asts: Bian Q. 4

Asty Tokushima, Tokushima

July 29
20:15

Report

Jordan	54–60	Iran
Scoring by quarter: 21–11, 12–10, 8–25, 13–14
Pts: Soobzokov 14; Rebs: Al-Khas 7 Asts: Al-Khas 4		Pts: Haddadi 18; Rebs: Haddadi 11; Asts: Sahakian 3

Asty Tokushima, Tokushima

July 30
15:45

Report

Iran	77–68	China
Scoring by quarter: 17–12, 16–21, 26–13, 18–22
Pts: A. Nikkhah 19; Rebs: Haddadi 8 Asts: Kamrani, A. Nikkhah 3		Pts: Bian Q. 15; Rebs: Wang B. 5 Asts: Han S. 2

Asty Tokushima, Tokushima

July 30
18:00

Report

Philippines	76–84	Jordan
Scoring by quarter: 18–13, 17–20, 16–21, 25–30
Pts: Taulava 14; Rebs: Williams 7 Asts: Helterbrand 5		Pts: Wright 24; Rebs: I. Abbas 9 Asts: Soobzokov, Daghlas 5

Asty Tokushima, Tokushima

=== Group B ===
Team	Pld	W	L	PF	PA	PD	Pts
Japan	3	3	0	287	181	+106	6
Lebanon	3	2	1	277	200	+77	5
United Arab Emirates	3	1	2	199	283	−84	4
Kuwait	3	0	3	175	274	−99	3

July 28
15:45

Report

United Arab Emirates	66–109	Japan
Scoring by quarter: 11–32, 15–26, 24–28, 16–23
Pts: Al-Zaabi 18; Rebs: Khalfan 6 Asts: Abdulredha, Al-Suwaidi, Khalfan 1		Pts: Orimo 17; Rebs: Takeuchi 7 Asts: Sakuragi 5

Asty Tokushima, Tokushima

July 28
20:15

Report

Lebanon	104–59	Kuwait
Scoring by quarter: 19–14, 29–15, 31–8, 25–22
Pts: Vogel 26; Rebs: Vogel 13; Asts: Mahmoud, El Khatib 1		Pts: F. Al-Rabah, Ashkanani 13; Rebs: Al-Tabakh 5 Asts: Mohammad, Farhan 1

Asty Tokushima, Tokushima

July 29
11:15

Report

Kuwait	68–69	United Arab Emirates
Scoring by quarter: 20–16, 18–16, 13–15, 17–22
Pts: Abdulredha 15; Rebs: Al-Tabakh 7 Asts: Abdulredha 3		Pts: Abdulredha 15; Rebs: Abdulredha 6 Asts: Abdulredha, Khamis 2

Municipal Gymnasium, Tokushima

July 29
15:45

Report

Japan	77–67	Lebanon
Scoring by quarter: 20–22, 14–18, 18–20, 25–7
Pts: Takeuchi 15; Rebs: Sakuragi 9 Asts: Amino 4		Pts: Vogel 21; Rebs: Beshara 9 Asts: Mahmoud 4

Asty Tokushima, Tokushima

July 30
11:15

Report

United Arab Emirates	64–106	Lebanon
Scoring by quarter: 3–34, 28–23, 19–31, 14–18
Pts: Abdulredha 15; Rebs: Ahmed 6 Asts: Moosa, Al-Nuaimi 2		Pts: El Khatib 37; Rebs: El Khatib 14; Asts: El Khatib 3

Asty Tokushima, Tokushima

July 30
20:15

Report

Japan	101–48	Kuwait
Scoring by quarter: 18–14, 29–3, 28–15, 26–16
Pts: Takeuchi 22; Rebs: Takeuchi 10; Asts: Takeuchi 6		Pts: Al-Tabakh 8 Rebs: Ashkanani, Farhan 5 Asts: Four players 1

Asty Tokushima, Tokushima

=== Group C ===
Team	Pld	W	L	PF	PA	PD	Pts
Qatar	3	3	0	268	163	+105	6
Kazakhstan	3	2	1	273	203	+70	5
India	3	1	2	195	269	−74	4
Indonesia	3	0	3	164	265	−101	3

July 28
9:00

Report

Qatar	106–49	India
Scoring by quarter: 22–12, 26–14, 27–19, 31–4
Pts: Mo. Saleem 14; Rebs: Ahmad 7 Asts: Musa 5		Pts: Kumar 11; Rebs: Ravindran, J. Singh 4 Asts: D. Singh 2

Asty Tokushima, Tokushima

July 28
9:00

Report

Kazakhstan	107–53	Indonesia
Scoring by quarter: 24–15, 34–9, 31–10, 18–19
Pts: Issakov 27; Rebs: Ponomarev 8 Asts: Yevstigneyev 1		Pts: Wuysang 21; Rebs: Ekayana, Indrajaya 4 Asts: Ekayana 2

Municipal Gymnasium, Tokushima

July 29
9:00

Report

India	74–97	Kazakhstan
Scoring by quarter: 11–23, 20–27, 20–24, 23–23
Pts: J. Singh 11; Rebs: Padavetiyil 5 Asts: Five players 1		Pts: Ponomarev 29; Rebs: Yevstigneyev 12; Asts: Issakov 4

Municipal Gymnasium, Tokushima

July 29
11:15

Report

Indonesia	45–86	Qatar
Scoring by quarter: 7–19, 12–28, 15–23, 11–16
Pts: Cokorda 10; Rebs: Situmorang 4 Asts: Wuysang, Situmorang 1		Pts: Musa, Ali 14; Rebs: Ahmad, Zaidan 5 Asts: Musa 3

Asty Tokushima, Tokushima

July 30
9:00

Report

Indonesia	66–72	India
Scoring by quarter: 18–21, 23–15, 14–16, 11–20
Pts: Sondakh 14; Rebs: Situmorang 6 Asts: Cokorda, Sondakh 1		Pts: Uddin 17; Rebs: Mukkanniyil, J. Singh 7 Asts: Kadam 2

Municipal Gymnasium, Tokushima

July 30
13:30

Report

Kazakhstan	69–76	Qatar
Scoring by quarter: 17–17, 13–23, 19–16, 20–20
Pts: Issakov 15; Rebs: Ponomarev 8 Asts: Voyeikov 3		Pts: Abdulrahman 25; Rebs: Musa 7 Asts: Ismail, Ali 4

Asty Tokushima, Tokushima

=== Group D ===
Team	Pld	W	L	PF	PA	PD	Pts
South Korea	3	3	0	281	216	+65	6
Chinese Taipei	3	2	1	258	232	+26	5
Hong Kong	3	1	2	252	305	−53	4
Syria	3	0	3	245	283	−38	3

July 28
11:15

Report

South Korea	107–67	Hong Kong
Scoring by quarter: 30–20, 15–15, 24–17, 38–15
Pts: Lee D.J. 19; Rebs: Ha S.J. 9 Asts: Yang D.G., Kim J.S. 3		Pts: Lo Y.T. 16; Rebs: Siu K.W., Li W.L., Poon C.H. 4 Asts: Four players 2

Municipal Gymnasium, Tokushima

July 28
13:30

Report

Syria	66–90	Chinese Taipei
Scoring by quarter: 19–15, 18–20, 18–25, 11–30
Pts: Madanly 37; Rebs: Hasaballah 12; Asts: Madanly, Hasaballah 2		Pts: Yang C.Y. 30; Rebs: Lin C.C. 11; Asts: Lin C.C. 3

Asty Tokushima, Tokushima

July 29
9:00

Report

Hong Kong	104–100	Syria
Scoring by quarter: 22–13, 23–29, 32–23, 27–35
Pts: Poon C.H. 38; Rebs: Fong S.Y. 11; Asts: Poon C.H. 6		Pts: Madanly 27; Rebs: Madanly 12; Asts: Madanly 4

Asty Tokushima, Tokushima

July 29
13:30

Report

Chinese Taipei	70–85	South Korea
Scoring by quarter: 14–25, 19–17, 17–24, 20–19
Pts: Wu T.H. 20; Rebs: Wu T.H., Chen H.A. 5 Asts: Chen S.N., Lee H.L., Lin C.C. 2		Pts: Ha S.J. 25; Rebs: Ha S.J. 7 Asts: Shin K.S. 5

Asty Tokushima, Tokushima

July 30
11:15

Report

Chinese Taipei	98–81	Hong Kong
Scoring by quarter: 29–15, 27–20, 20–21, 22–25
Pts: Wu T.H. 24; Rebs: Chen H.A. 7 Asts: Wu T.H. 5		Pts: Li K.W. 18; Rebs: Fong S.Y. 6 Asts: Li K.W. 3

Asty Tokushima, Tokushima

July 30
11:15

Report

Syria	79–89	South Korea
Scoring by quarter: 17–27, 17–20, 18–28, 27–14
Pts: Al-Samman 20; Rebs: Al-Hakam 8 Asts: Al-Khatib, Madanly, Al-Sharif 1		Pts: Kim J.S. 17; Rebs: Ha S.J., Lee D.J. 12; Asts: Kim S.H. 5

Municipal Gymnasium, Tokushima

== Quarterfinal round ==
=== Group E ===
Team	Pld	W	L	PF	PA	PD	Pts
Lebanon	3	3	0	267	192	+75	6
Iran	3	2	1	231	233	−2	5
Qatar	3	1	2	242	259	−17	4
Chinese Taipei	3	0	3	202	258	−56	3

July 31
13:30

Report

Iran	76–64	Chinese Taipei
Scoring by quarter: 23–17, 14–17, 24–10, 15–20
Pts: S. Nikkhah 22; Rebs: Haddadi 16; Asts: A. Nikkhah 3		Pts: Wu T.H., Chen H.A. 16; Rebs: Wu T.H. 6 Asts: Lee H.L. 4

Asty Tokushima, Tokushima

July 31
15:45

Report

Lebanon	90–68	Qatar
Scoring by quarter: 27–16, 25–14, 18–29, 20–9
Pts: El Khatib 38; Rebs: El Khatib 9 Asts: El Khatib 5		Pts: Ismail 19; Rebs: Ismail 9 Asts: Four players 1

Asty Tokushima, Tokushima

August 1
15:45

Report

Chinese Taipei	64–95	Lebanon
Scoring by quarter: 13–21, 12–18, 23–28, 16–28
Pts: Chen H.A. 21; Rebs: Chen S.N. 7 Asts: Chen S.N. 4		Pts: El Khatib 28; Rebs: Beshara 7 Asts: Vogel 2

Asty Tokushima, Tokushima

August 1
18:00

Report

Qatar	87–95	Iran
Scoring by quarter: 20–24, 21–20, 22–24, 24–27
Pts: Musa 21; Rebs: Four players 4 Asts: Ali 3		Pts: A. Nikkhah 25; Rebs: Haddadi 9 Asts: Kamrani 5

Asty Tokushima, Tokushima

August 2
13:30

Report

Qatar	87–74	Chinese Taipei
Scoring by quarter: 20–12, 20–20, 22–19, 25–23
Pts: Ismail 24; Rebs: Ismail 10; Asts: Ismail 4		Pts: Chen H.A. 18; Rebs: Tseng W.T. 9 Asts: Chen S.N., Lee C.Y., Lin Y.H. 2

Asty Tokushima, Tokushima

August 2
18:00

Report

Iran	60–82	Lebanon
Scoring by quarter: 14–24, 11–21, 21–15, 14–22
Pts: A. Nikkhah 16; Rebs: Haddadi 6 Asts: Kamrani 3		Pts: El Khatib 22; Rebs: Vogel 13; Asts: El Khatib 4

Asty Tokushima, Tokushima

=== Group F ===
Team	Pld	W	L	PF	PA	PD	Pts	Tiebreaker
Kazakhstan	3	2	1	241	240	+1	5	1–0
South Korea	3	2	1	236	223	+13	5	0–1
Japan	3	1	2	239	254	−15	4	1–0
Jordan	3	1	2	215	214	+1	4	0–1

July 31
18:00

Report

Jordan	65–70	South Korea
Scoring by quarter: 16–19, 19–20, 16–17, 14–14
Pts: Wright 23; Rebs: I. Abbas 9 Asts: Wright, Soobzokov, Daghlas 1		Pts: Ha S.J. 21; Rebs: Ha S.J. 12; Asts: Kim S.H. 4

Asty Tokushima, Tokushima

July 31
20:15

Report

Japan	85–93	Kazakhstan
Scoring by quarter: 15–26, 21–20, 15–16, 34–31
Pts: Kawamura 21; Rebs: Sakuragi 6 Asts: Kashiwagi 7		Pts: Ponomarev 24; Rebs: Yargaliyev 7 Asts: Nechayev 5

Asty Tokushima, Tokushima

August 1
18:00

Report

Kazakhstan	73–82	Jordan
Scoring by quarter: 28–19, 11–27, 18–14, 16–22
Pts: Issakov 20; Rebs: Ponomarev 8 Asts: Voyeikov, Ponomarev, Issakov 2		Pts: Wright, Z. Abbas, Al-Khas 16; Rebs: Al-Khas 6 Asts: Daghlas 6

Asty Tokushima, Tokushima

August 1
20:15

Report

South Korea	93–83	Japan
Scoring by quarter: 22–15, 21–18, 22–17, 28–33
Pts: Yang D.G. 29; Rebs: Ha S.J. 9 Asts: Shin K.S., Kim S.H., Yang H.J. 2		Pts: Kawamura, Sakuragi 17; Rebs: Sakuragi 17; Asts: Amino 2

Asty Tokushima, Tokushima

August 2
15:45

Report

Kazakhstan	75–73	South Korea
Scoring by quarter: 17–16, 22–21, 11–11, 25–25
Pts: Ponomarev 20; Rebs: Ponomarev 11; Asts: Nechayev 3		Pts: Kim J.S. 30; Rebs: Kim J.S. 9 Asts: Kim S.H. 6

Asty Tokushima, Tokushima

August 2
20:15

Report

Jordan	68–71	Japan
Scoring by quarter: 7–21, 19–16, 21–25, 21–9
Pts: Wright 15; Rebs: Daghlas, Al-Khas 7 Asts: Daghlas 4		Pts: Sakuragi 17; Rebs: Sakuragi 8 Asts: Igarashi, Sakuragi 3

Asty Tokushima, Tokushima

=== Group G ===
Team	Pld	W	L	PF	PA	PD	Pts
Philippines	3	3	0	300	227	+73	6
Syria	3	2	1	314	230	+84	5
Kuwait	3	1	2	199	266	−67	4
India	3	0	3	191	281	−90	3

July 31
9:00

Report

Philippines	107–100 (OT)	Syria
Scoring by quarter: 18–24, 17–14, 30–27, 24–24, Overtime: 18–11
Pts: Alapag 32; Rebs: Taulava 17; Asts: Alapag 5		Pts: Madanly 33; Rebs: Yakoub 14; Asts: Al-Khatib 2

Asty Tokushima, Tokushima

July 31
11:15

Report

Kuwait	72–68	India
Scoring by quarter: 23–27, 13–11, 15–14, 21–16
Pts: Farhan 23; Rebs: Al-Tabakh, Farhan 8 Asts: Abdulredha, Farhan 2		Pts: Rai 20; Rebs: J. Singh 9 Asts: Kadam 9

Asty Tokushima, Tokushima

August 1
9:00

Report

India	69–104	Philippines
Scoring by quarter: 18–25, 23–22, 14–35, 14–22
Pts: Kadam 12; Rebs: Raj 10; Asts: Kadam 8		Pts: Norwood, Seigle 23; Rebs: Seigle 11; Asts: Norwood 4

Municipal Gymnasium, Tokushima

August 1
11:15

Report

Syria	109–69	Kuwait
Scoring by quarter: 29–12, 19–17, 32–14, 29–26
Pts: Madanly 43; Rebs: Yakoub 15; Asts: Al-Sharif 6		Pts: F. Al-Rabah 15; Rebs: Al-Mutairi, Al-Khabbaz 5 Asts: Abdulredha 4

Municipal Gymnasium, Tokushima

August 2
9:00

Report

Philippines	89–58	Kuwait
Scoring by quarter: 23–10, 23–10, 27–27, 16–11
Pts: Norwood 18; Rebs: Williams 13; Asts: Norwood 5		Pts: Abdulredha 14; Rebs: F. Al-Rabah 6 Asts: F. Al-Rabah 5

Asty Tokushima, Tokushima

August 2
11:15

Report

India	54–105	Syria
Scoring by quarter: 16–34, 12–13, 10–37, 16–21
Pts: Rai 14; Rebs: J. Singh 6 Asts: Kadam 3		Pts: Madanly 36; Rebs: Hasaballah 11; Asts: Al-Sharif 6

Asty Tokushima, Tokushima

=== Group H ===
Team	Pld	W	L	PF	PA	PD	Pts
China	3	3	0	295	171	+124	6
Indonesia	3	2	1	211	261	−50	5
Hong Kong	3	1	2	234	238	−4	4
United Arab Emirates	3	0	3	200	270	−70	3

July 31
9:00

Report

China	93–69	Hong Kong
Scoring by quarter: 21–14, 28–14, 20–20, 24–21
Pts: Gu L.Y. 22; Rebs: Gu L.Y. 6 Asts: Four players 2		Pts: Li K.W. 19; Rebs: Wong C.W. 5 Asts: Lo Y.T. 5

Municipal Gymnasium, Tokushima

July 31
11:15

Report

United Arab Emirates	81–83 (OT)	Indonesia
Scoring by quarter: 25–20, 12–21, 18–16, 16–14, Overtime: 10–12
Pts: Ahmed 25; Rebs: Mohamed 11; Asts: Four players 1		Pts: Wuysang 22; Rebs: Situmorang 8 Asts: Ahmad, Sondakh 3

Municipal Gymnasium, Tokushima

August 1
9:00

Report

Indonesia	47–102	China
Scoring by quarter: 8–20, 17–27, 14–31, 8–24
Pts: Ahmad 13; Rebs: Indrajaya 6 Asts: Poedjakesuma, Ahmad, Jati 2		Pts: Yi L. 23; Rebs: Gu L.Y. 8 Asts: Chen L., Li K. 2

Asty Tokushima, Tokushima

August 1
11:15

Report

Hong Kong	87–64	United Arab Emirates
Scoring by quarter: 24–9, 22–15, 22–16, 19–24
Pts: Li W.L. 24; Rebs: Fong S.Y. 10; Asts: Poon C.H. 3		Pts: Khamis 20; Rebs: Khamis 8 Asts: Al-Nuaimi 2

Asty Tokushima, Tokushima

August 2
9:00

Report

China	100–55	United Arab Emirates
Scoring by quarter: 33–13, 21–15, 28–17, 18–10
Pts: Chen C. 25; Rebs: Yi L., Li K. 7 Asts: Yang M., Wang B. 4		Pts: Ahmed 17; Rebs: Moosa 7 Asts: Khalfan 2

Municipal Gymnasium, Tokushima

August 2
11:15

Report

Indonesia	81–78	Hong Kong
Scoring by quarter: 25–22, 16–20, 22–20, 20–14
Pts: Prihantono 14; Rebs: Poedjakesuma, Tiara, Gunawan 7 Asts: Wuysang 4		Pts: Tam W.Y. 17; Rebs: Li W.L., Tam W.Y. 8 Asts: Poon C.H. 4

Municipal Gymnasium, Tokushima

== Classification 9th–16th ==
=== 15th place ===
August 4
9:00

Report

India	82–77	United Arab Emirates
Scoring by quarter: 20–22, 27–15, 21–15, 14–25
Pts: Rai 23; Rebs: Mukkanniyil 9 Asts: Kadam 5		Pts: Ahmed 15; Rebs: Khamis, Khalfan 8 Asts: Al-Zaabi 3

Municipal Gymnasium, Tokushima

=== 13th place ===
August 4
11:15

Report

Kuwait	66–72	Hong Kong
Scoring by quarter: 16–27, 15–13, 15–14, 20–18
Pts: Abdulredha 19; Rebs: Ashkanani 10; Asts: Al-Tabakh, F. Al-Rabah 3		Pts: Fong S.Y., Wong C.W., Tam W.Y. 12; Rebs: Fong S.Y. 12; Asts: Poon C.H. 7

Municipal Gymnasium, Tokushima

=== 11th place ===
August 4
9:00

Report

Syria	108–79	Indonesia
Scoring by quarter: 34–17, 14–16, 30–19, 30–27
Pts: Madanly 40; Rebs: Yakoub 15; Asts: Al-Sharif 5		Pts: Wuysang 33; Rebs: Wuysang 5 Asts: Wuysang 5

Asty Tokushima, Tokushima

=== 9th place ===
August 4
11:15

Report

Philippines	78–76	China
Scoring by quarter: 19–22, 17–16, 23–23, 19–15
Pts: Seigle 20; Rebs: Williams 8 Asts: Alapag 2		Pts: Zhang K. 16; Rebs: Zhang K. 9 Asts: Li K. 3

Asty Tokushima, Tokushima

== Classification 5th–8th ==
Semifinals
August 4
Japan	80
Chinese Taipei	85
August 4
Qatar	67
Jordan	77

5th place
August 5
Chinese Taipei	74
Jordan	97
7th place
August 5
Japan	82
Qatar	86

=== Semifinals ===
August 4
13:30

Report

Qatar	67–77	Jordan
Scoring by quarter: 21–26, 17–18, 14–19, 15–14
Pts: Ali 22; Rebs: Abdulrahman, Ismail 6 Asts: Turki, Ali 2		Pts: Adais 25; Rebs: Adais 14; Asts: Daghlas, Al-Sous 2

Asty Tokushima, Tokushima

August 4
15:45

Report

Japan	80–85	Chinese Taipei
Scoring by quarter: 23–25, 17–13, 22–25, 18–22
Pts: Amino, Sakuragi 15; Rebs: Sakuragi 6 Asts: Igarashi 3		Pts: Chen H.A. 26; Rebs: Chen H.A. 9 Asts: Chen H.A. 3

Asty Tokushima, Tokushima

=== 7th place ===
August 5
15:45

Report

Japan	82–86	Qatar
Scoring by quarter: 22–17, 16–17, 19–15, 25–37
Pts: Kawamura 20; Rebs: Takeuchi 12; Asts: Amino 5		Pts: Ismail 18; Rebs: Abdulrahman 15; Asts: Musa 4

Asty Tokushima, Tokushima

=== 5th place ===
August 5
13:30

Report

Chinese Taipei	74–97	Jordan
Scoring by quarter: 19–19, 12–22, 13–27, 30–29
Pts: Chen H.A. 13; Rebs: Wu T.H., Lee C.Y. 5 Asts: Chen S.N. 3		Pts: Z. Abbas 24; Rebs: Z. Abbas 13; Asts: Soobzokov 3

Asty Tokushima, Tokushima

== Final round ==
Semifinals
August 4
Kazakhstan	62
Iran	75
August 4
Lebanon	76
South Korea	74

Final
August 5
Iran	74
Lebanon	69
3rd place
August 5
Kazakhstan	76
South Korea	80

=== Semifinals ===
August 4
18:00

Report

Lebanon	76–74	South Korea
Scoring by quarter: 23–15, 13–26, 24–13, 16–20
Pts: El Khatib 32; Rebs: Vogel 15; Asts: Fahed 2		Pts: Kim D.W. 23; Rebs: Ha S.J. 10; Asts: Ha S.J., Kim J.S. 2

Asty Tokushima, Tokushima

August 4
20:15

Report

Kazakhstan	62–75	Iran
Scoring by quarter: 7–26, 12–18, 18–20, 25–11
Pts: Korovnikov 17; Rebs: Yevstigneyev, Tyutyunik 7 Asts: Voyeikov, Shpekht 2		Pts: Kamrani, Afagh 14; Rebs: Haddadi 13; Asts: Kamrani 4

Asty Tokushima, Tokushima

=== 3rd place ===
August 5
18:00

Report

Kazakhstan	76–80	South Korea
Scoring by quarter: 25–23, 16–19, 14–19, 21–19
Pts: Ponomarev 16; Rebs: Ponomarev 6 Asts: Voyeikov 5		Pts: Ha S.J. 25; Rebs: Ha S.J. 7 Asts: Yang D.G. 4

Asty Tokushima, Tokushima

=== Final ===
August 5
20:15

Report

Iran	74–69	Lebanon
Scoring by quarter: 21–19, 19–15, 16–20, 18–15
Pts: Haddadi 31; Rebs: Haddadi 10; Asts: Kamrani 2		Pts: Fahed 23; Rebs: Abdelnour, El Khatib 8 Asts: El Khatib 4

Asty Tokushima, Tokushima

== Final standings ==
Qualified for the 2008 Summer Olympics
Qualified for the Olympic Qualifying Tournament

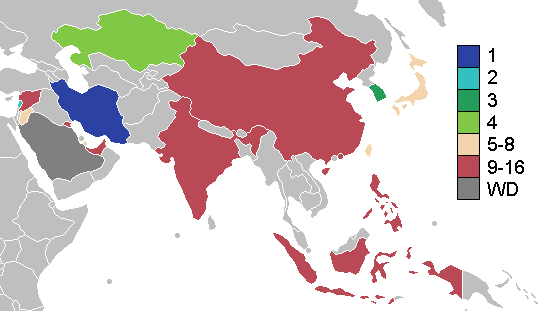
Participating countries

Rank	Team	Record
1st place, gold medalist(s)	Iran	7–1
2nd place, silver medalist(s)	Lebanon	6–2
3rd place, bronze medalist(s)	South Korea	6–2
4	Kazakhstan	4–4
5	Jordan	5–3
6	Chinese Taipei	3–5
7	Qatar	5–3
8	Japan	4–4
9	Philippines	5–2
10	China	3–4
11	Syria	3–4
12	Indonesia	2–5
13	Hong Kong	3–4
14	Kuwait	1–6
15	India	2–5
16	United Arab Emirates	1–6

== Awards ==
2007 Asian champions

Iran
First title

== Statistical leaders ==
Points

Pos.	Name	PPG
1	(Syria) Michael Madanly	33.1
2	(Lebanon) Fadi El Khatib	27.3
3	(Chinese Taipei) Chen Hsin-an	18.1
3	(Jordan) Rasheim Wright	18.1
5	(Kazakhstan) Anton Ponomarev	17.6
6	(Lebanon) Joe Vogel	17.4
7	(South Korea) Ha Seung-jin	17.3
8	(Syria) Nour Al-Samman	16.6
9	(Philippines) Jimmy Alapag	16.0
10	(South Korea) Kim Joo-sung	15.5

Rebounds

Pos.	Name	RPG
1	(Syria) Wissam Yakoub	10.6
2	(Iran) Hamed Haddadi	9.6
3	(South Korea) Ha Seung-jin	9.1
4	(Lebanon) Joe Vogel	8.9
5	(Syria) Michael Madanly	8.1
6	(Hong Kong) Fong Shing Yee	7.6
7	(Syria) Radwan Hasaballah	7.4
8	(Philippines) Asi Taulava	7.1
9	(Kazakhstan) Anton Ponomarev	7.1
9	(Japan) J. R. Sakuragi	7.1

Assists

Pos.	Name	APG
1	(India) Sambhaji Kadam	4.0
2	(Hong Kong) Poon Chi Ho	3.1
3	(Jordan) Sam Daghlas	3.1
4	(South Korea) Kim Seung-hyun	2.9
4	(South Korea) Yang Dong-geun	2.9
6	(Philippines) Jimmy Alapag	2.8
7	(Iran) Mehdi Kamrani	2.6
8	(Syria) Sharif Al-Sharif	2.6
9	(Japan) J. R. Sakuragi	2.4
10	(Qatar) Daoud Musa	2.3
10	(Syria) Michael Madanly	2.3

Steals

Pos.	Name	SPG
1	(India) Sambhaji Kadam	2.3
2	(Japan) Kei Igarashi	1.8
3	(Kuwait) Rashed Al-Rabah	1.7
4	(Qatar) Saad Abdulrahman	1.6
5	(Kuwait) Saqer Abdulredha	1.6
5	(Syria) Michael Madanly	1.6
7	(Iran) Mehdi Kamrani	1.5
7	(South Korea) Yang Dong-geun	1.5
9	(Hong Kong) Poon Chi Ho	1.4
10	(Iran) Hamed Afagh	1.4

Blocks

Pos.	Name	BPG
1	(Iran) Hamed Haddadi	1.4
2	(South Korea) Ha Seung-jin	1.0
2	(Lebanon) Joe Vogel	1.0
4	(Chinese Taipei) Wu Tai-hao	0.9
5	(Kuwait) Sulaiman Al-Tabakh	0.7
6	(Qatar) Yasseen Ismail	0.6
6	(Qatar) Omer Abdelqader	0.6
8	(China) Wu Qian	0.6
9	(South Korea) Kim Joo-sung	0.5
9	(Iran) Oshin Sahakian	0.5
