= 1998 ABC Under-18 Championship for Women =

1998 FIBA U18 Women's Asia Cup
14th FIBA Under-18 Women's Asian Basketball Championship

Tournament details
- Host country: Japan
- Dates: September 13–20
- Teams: 12 (from 44 federations)
- Venue: 1 (in 1 host city)

Final positions
- Champions: China (7th title)

The ABC Under-18 Championship for Women 1998 is the 14th edition of the ABC's junior championship for basketball. The games were held at Tokushima, Japan from September 13–20, 1998.

== Preliminary round ==
=== Group A ===
Team	Pld	W	L	PF	PA	PD	Pts	Tiebreaker
China	5	5	0	519	142	+377	10	
Chinese Taipei	5	4	1	464	290	+174	9	
Uzbekistan	5	3	2	278	304	−26	7	1–0
Hong Kong	5	2	3	240	370	−130	7	0–1
India	5	1	4	278	435	−157	6	
Philippines	5	0	5	207	445	−238	5	

September 13

Hong Kong	54–53	India
Scoring by half: 28–25, 26–28

Asty Tokushima, Tokushima

September 13

Philippines	45–101	Chinese Taipei
Scoring by half: 24–55, 21–46

Asty Tokushima, Tokushima

September 13

China	20–0	Uzbekistan
Walkover

Asty Tokushima, Tokushima

September 14

China	119–30	Hong Kong
Scoring by half: 60–16, 59–14

Asty Tokushima, Tokushima

September 14

India	49–96	Chinese Taipei
Scoring by half: 20–54, 29–42

Asty Tokushima, Tokushima

September 14

Uzbekistan	84–46	Philippines
Scoring by half: 39–26, 45–20

Asty Tokushima, Tokushima

September 15

Chinese Taipei	112–48	Uzbekistan
Scoring by half: 55–20, 57–28

Asty Tokushima, Tokushima

September 15

India	26–152	China
Scoring by half: 19–83, 7–69

Asty Tokushima, Tokushima

September 15

Hong Kong	56–38	Philippines
Scoring by half: 30–22, 26–16

Asty Tokushima, Tokushima

September 17

Hong Kong	41–98	Chinese Taipei
Scoring by half: 23–56, 18–42

Asty Tokushima, Tokushima

September 17

Philippines	29–121	China
Scoring by half: 19–58, 10–63

Asty Tokushima, Tokushima

September 17

Uzbekistan	84–67	India
Scoring by half: 29–29, 55–38

Asty Tokushima, Tokushima

September 18

India	83–49	Philippines
Scoring by half: 39–24, 44–25

Asty Tokushima, Tokushima

September 18

Hong Kong	59–62	Uzbekistan
Scoring by half: 32–29, 27–33

Asty Tokushima, Tokushima

September 18

Chinese Taipei	57–107	China
Scoring by half: 27–59, 30–48

Asty Tokushima, Tokushima

=== Group B ===
Team	Pld	W	L	PF	PA	PD	Pts
Japan	5	5	0	534	133	+401	10
South Korea	5	4	1	595	156	+439	9
Malaysia	5	3	2	286	255	+31	8
Sri Lanka	5	2	3	170	360	−190	7
Macau	5	1	4	219	458	−239	6
Laos	5	0	5	91	533	−442	5

September 13

Malaysia	68–25	Sri Lanka
Scoring by half: 33–14, 35–11

Asty Tokushima, Tokushima

September 13

Japan	141–30	Macau
Scoring by half: 70–15, 71–15

Asty Tokushima, Tokushima

September 13

South Korea	166–18	Laos
Scoring by half: 88–5, 78–13

Asty Tokushima, Tokushima

September 14

Sri Lanka	21–121	South Korea
Scoring by half: 17–61, 4–60

Asty Tokushima, Tokushima

September 14

Laos	7–131	Japan
Scoring by half: 6–65, 1–66

Asty Tokushima, Tokushima

September 14

Macau	39–75	Malaysia
Scoring by half: 20–26, 19–49

Asty Tokushima, Tokushima

September 15

Laos	16–56	Sri Lanka
Scoring by half: 13–18, 3–38

Asty Tokushima, Tokushima

September 15

Macau	20–157	South Korea
Scoring by half: 13–78, 7–79

Asty Tokushima, Tokushima

September 15

Japan	81–22	Malaysia
Scoring by half: 43–9, 38–13

Asty Tokushima, Tokushima

September 17

Malaysia	91–21	Laos
Scoring by half: 57–15, 34–6

Asty Tokushima, Tokushima

September 17

South Korea	62–67	Japan
Scoring by half: 40–35, 22–32

Asty Tokushima, Tokushima

September 17

Sri Lanka	56–41	Macau
Scoring by half: 25–18, 31–23

Asty Tokushima, Tokushima

September 18

Macau	89–29	Laos
Scoring by half: 48–22, 41–7

Asty Tokushima, Tokushima

September 18

Sri Lanka	12–114	Japan
Scoring by half: 8–49, 4–65

Asty Tokushima, Tokushima

September 18

South Korea	89–30	Malaysia
Scoring by half: 49–15, 40–15

Asty Tokushima, Tokushima

== Classification 5th–12th ==
=== 11th place ===
September 19

Philippines	102–31	Laos
Scoring by half: 38–19, 64–12

Asty Tokushima, Tokushima

=== 9th place ===
September 19

India	80–36	Macau
Scoring by half: 49–18, 31–18

Asty Tokushima, Tokushima

=== 7th place ===
September 19

Hong Kong	57–49	Sri Lanka
Scoring by half: 22–29, 35–20

Asty Tokushima, Tokushima

=== 5th place ===
September 19

Uzbekistan	57–68	Malaysia
Scoring by half: 33–36, 24–32

Asty Tokushima, Tokushima

== Final round ==
Semifinals
September 19
China	70
South Korea	59
September 19
Chinese Taipei	74
Japan	66

Final
September 20
China	81
Chinese Taipei	40
3rd place
September 20
South Korea	46
Japan	43

=== Semifinals ===
September 19

China	70–59	South Korea
Scoring by half: 43–28, 27–31

Asty Tokushima, Tokushima

September 19

Chinese Taipei	74–66	Japan
Scoring by half: 29–29, 45–37

Asty Tokushima, Tokushima

=== 3rd place ===
September 20

South Korea	46–43	Japan
Scoring by half: 25–23, 21–20

Asty Tokushima, Tokushima

=== Final ===
September 20

China	81–40	Chinese Taipei
Scoring by half: 39–28, 42–12

Asty Tokushima, Tokushima

== Final standing ==
Rank	Team	Record
1st place, gold medalist(s)	China	7–0
2nd place, silver medalist(s)	Chinese Taipei	5–2
3rd place, bronze medalist(s)	South Korea	5–2
4	Japan	5–2
5	Malaysia	4–2
6	Uzbekistan	3–3
7	Hong Kong	3–3
8	Sri Lanka	2–4
9	India	2–4
10	Macau	1–5
11	Philippines	1–5
12	Laos	0–6

== Awards ==
1998 Asian Under-18 champions

China
Seventh title
