= Mazen Mneimneh =

Lebanese basketball player

Mazen Mneimneh (born 1 February 1986 in Lebanon) is a Lebanese basketball player. He is a six-foot-four-inch tall shooting guard.

Mneimneh currently plays for Champville BC of the Lebanese Basketball League. Prior to this, he played five seasons with Lebanese Sporting Al Riyadi Beirut and 4 seasons for Al Mouttahed Tripoli and with Byblos Club.

Mneimneh is also a member of the Lebanon national basketball team. He competed with the senior team for the first time at the FIBA Asia Championship 2007 and later returned to the team for the FIBA Asia Championship 2009
