= Iman Zandi =

Iranian basketball player

Personal information
- Born: September 17, 1981 (age 45) Fooladshahr, Isfahan, Iran
- Listed height: 6 ft 2 in (1.88 m)
- Listed weight: 195 lb (88 kg)

Career information
- Playing career: 1998–2021
- Position: Shooting guard

Career history
- 1998–2005: Zob Ahan Isfahan
- 2005–2006: Sanam Tehran
- 2007–2009: BEEM
- 2009–2010: Louleh
- 2010–2011: Jahesh Tarabar
- 2011–2012: Sanaye Petrochimi
- 2012–2013: Naft Sepahan Tehran
- 2013–2014: Zob Ahan Isfahan
- 2014–2016: Pemina Isfahan
- 2016: Shahrdari Gorgan
- 2016: Mahindra Enforcer
- 2016–2017: Chemidor
- 2017–2018: Azad University
- 2018–2020: Zob Ahan Isfahan
- 2020–2021: Parsa
Medals
Asian Games
Bronze medal – third place	2006 Doha	Team
Bronze medal – third place	2010 Guangzhou	Team
Asian Championship
Gold medal – first place	2007 Tokushima	Team
Gold medal – first place	2009 Tianjin	Team

Iman Zandi (Persian: ایمان زندی, born 19 September 1981 in Fooladshahr, Iran) is a professional Iranian basketball player. He last played for the Parsa of the Iranian Basketball Super League. He also played for the Iranian national basketball team. He is 6 ft 2 in (1.88 m) in height.
