= J. R. Sakuragi =

American-Japanese basketball player

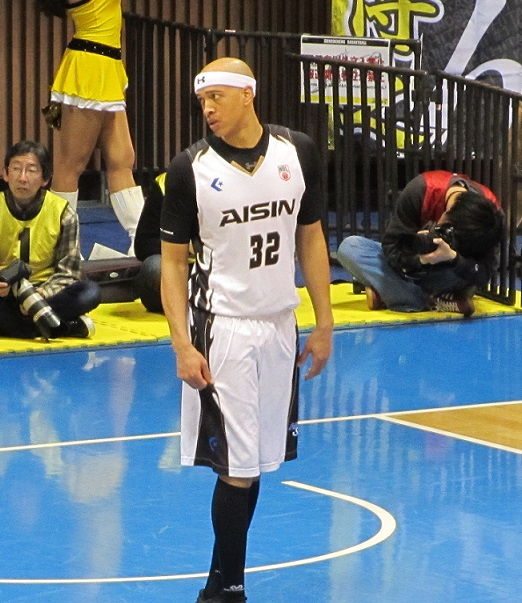
- Sakuragi with the Aisin Seahorses in 2016

Toyama Grouses
- Title: Supervising coach
- League: B.League

Personal information
- Born: October 30, 1976 (age 50) Bakersfield, California, U.S.
- Listed height: 6 ft 8 in (2.03 m)
- Listed weight: 226 lb (103 kg)

Career information
- High school: East Bakersfield (East Bakersfield, California)
- College: UCLA (1994–1998)
- NBA draft: 1998: 2nd round, 56th overall pick
- Drafted by: Vancouver Grizzlies
- Playing career: 1998–2023
- Position: Power forward / center
- Number: 52

Career history

Playing
- 1998–1999: Quad City Thunder
- 1999: Vancouver Grizzlies
- 1999–2001: Las Vegas Silver Bandits
- 2001: Paris Basket Racing
- 2001: Marinos de Oriente
- 2001–2005: Aisin Seahorses
- 2005: Marinos de Anzoátegui
- 2006: Grises de Humacao
- 2006–2007: Aisin Seahorses
- 2007: Grises de Humacao
- 2007–2020: Aisin Seahorses
- 2023: Koshigaya Alphas

Coaching
- 2020–2021: Aisin AW Wings
- 2021–2023: Koshigaya Alphas
- 2023–present: Toyama Grouses

Career highlights
- 3× JBL MVP (2011-2013); JBL Finals MVP (2013); B.League Lifetime Achievement Award (2021); NCAA champion (1995); 2× First-team All-Pac-10 (1996, 1998)
- Stats at NBA.com
- Stats at Basketball Reference

J. R. Sakuragi (Japanese: 桜木 ジェイアール, Hepburn: Sakuragi Jei Āru; born Milton J. Henderson Jr.; October 30, 1976) is an American-Japanese professional basketball player.

== Biography ==
Raised in Bakersfield, California, Sakuragi played college basketball at the University of California, Los Angeles (UCLA), and was a member of the Bruins' national championship team in 1994–95. He was able to play all five positions. On the NCAA championship team in his freshman year, Sakuragi was named the team's most valuable freshman along with Toby Bailey. He was named to the All-Pac-10 first team during his sophomore and senior seasons, and was also named the Bruins' co-most valuable player both years as well. He averaged 14.2 points per game in his four-year career at the school. He was selected by the Vancouver Grizzlies in the 2nd round (56th pick) of the 1998 NBA draft where he played one season.

Sakuragi played the next two years for teams in Las Vegas and France and summer-league teams in Puerto Rico and the Philippines. In 2001, he moved to Japan to play for the Aisin Seahorses of the JBL Super League, averaging 21.5 points and 11.6 rebounds per game in 2006.

Sakuragi's application to become a naturalized Japanese citizen cleared on July 2, 2007, and he changed his name from J. R. Henderson to J. R. Sakuragi. He chose his new name for two reasons: firstly, he thought a Japanese name would speed up the naturalization, and secondly for the Japanese sakura cherry blossoms. It also corresponded to the name of Hanamichi Sakuragi, the protagonist of the popular basketball manga Slam Dunk.

Sakuragi played for the Japan national team as they competed in the 2007 FIBA Asia Championship, a qualifier for the 2008 Summer Olympics.

To comply with Japanese naturalization requirements, Sakuragi taught himself to read, speak and write Japanese at a "rudimentary level". He intended to stay in Japan without intention of returning to live in the U.S.
