= Asty Tokushima =

Indoor arena and conference venue in Tokushima, Tokushima, Japan

- アスティとくしま
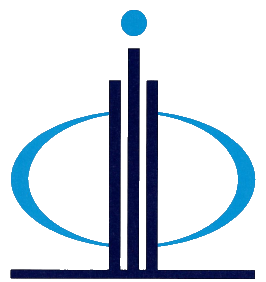

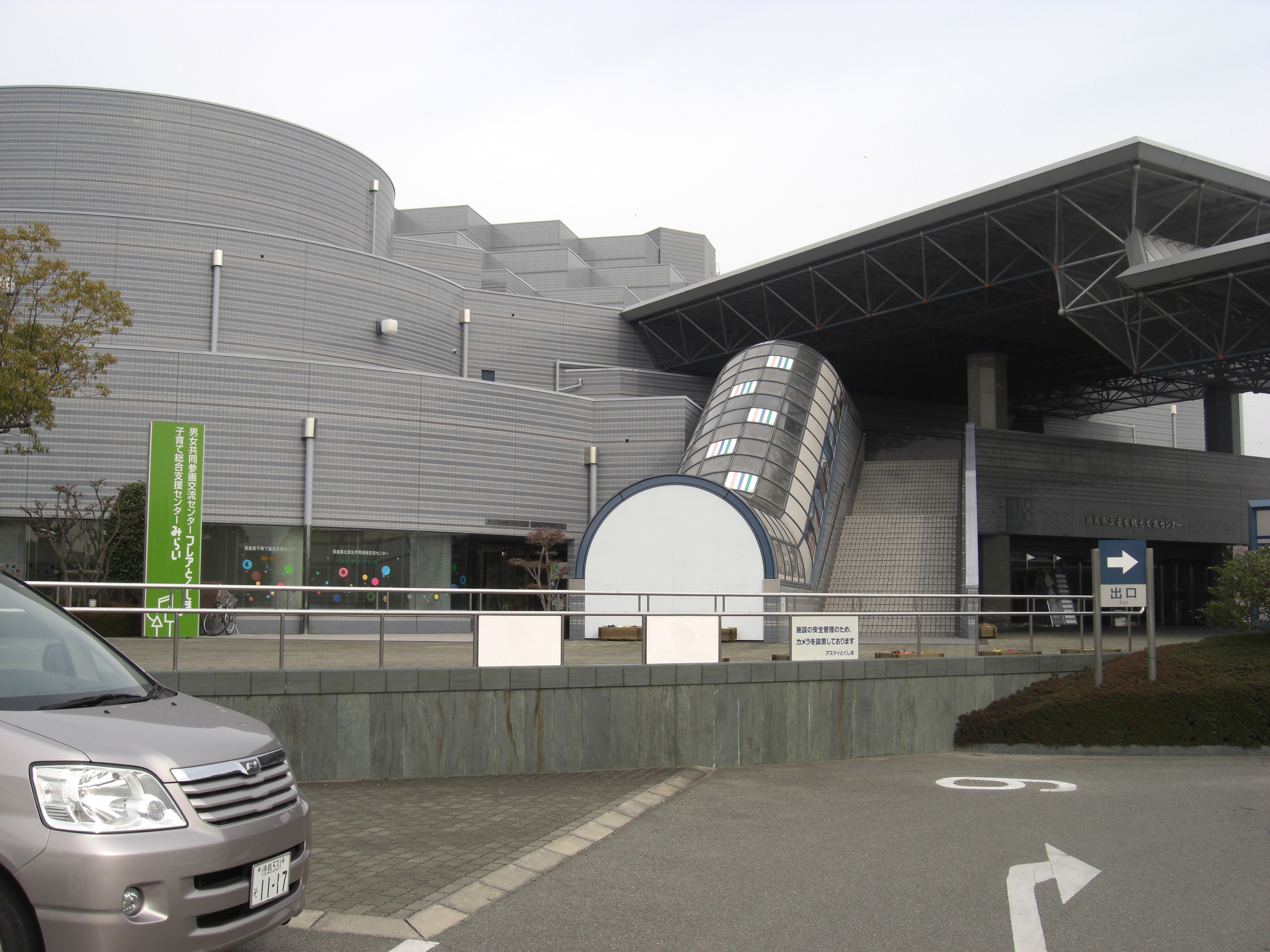
- Interactive map of the Asty Tokushima area
- Alternative names: Tokushima Industry and Tourism Exchange Center

General information
- Location: Tokushima City, Japan
- Coordinates: 34.053147°N 134.563894°E
- Construction started: July 1991
- Completed: September 1993
- Opened: October 20, 1993
- Cost: ¥200 billion

Height
- Height: 28.5 metres (94 ft)

Technical details
- Material: Reinforced concrete (through steel)
- Floor count: 3
- Floor area: 22,000 square metres (240,000 sq ft)

Other information
- Seating capacity: Multi-Purpose Hall: 5,000 (conference, convention); 4,000 (rock festivals, concerts, sporting events)
- Parking: 534 slots

Website
- www.asty-tokushima.jp

Asty Tokushima (アスティとくしま) or the Tokushima Industry and Tourism Exchange Center (徳島県立産業観光交流センター, Tokushima Kenritsu Sangyō Kankō Kōryū Sentā) is an indoor arena and conference venue in Tokushima, Tokushima, Japan. The arena opened in 1993.

"ASTY" in the venue's name is an acronym which stands for "Attractive Space in Tokushima Yamashiro".

Notable sports events hosted by the arena include the official 2007 Asian Basketball Championship.

== Construction ==
Asty Tokushima was constructed for three years, from July 1991 until September 1993. It was opened on October 20, 1993.

== Features ==
Asty Tokushima's main feature is its multi-purpose hall which has a maximum seating capacity of 5000 to accommodate large-scale conferences and conventions. This figure is smaller for rock festivals, concerts and sporting events such as professional tennis, volleyball and sumo matches, where the maximum possible seating capacity is 4,000. The hall's whole 3,000 square metres (32,000 sq ft) space could be used for trade fairs and exhibitions.

There are also 6 conference rooms within the venue with a capacity of 75-150 people each and 2 special conference rooms with 150-300 seating capacity. The Flair Tokushima Hall is another room within the venue with 142 fixed seating capacity and there are two training rooms hosted within the venue as well with 54 and 24 seating capacity respectively.
