= Roy Samaha =

Lebanese basketball player (born 1984)

No. 10 – Free Agent
- Position: Center

Personal information
- Born: September 12, 1984 (age 42) Zahlé, Lebanon
- Listed height: 6 ft 9 in (2.06 m)
- Listed weight: 256 lb (116 kg)

Career information
- Playing career: 2000–present

Career history
- 1999–2004: Club Sagesse
- 2004–2007: Blue Stars
- 2007–2009: Al Mouttahed Tripoli
- 2009–2010: Club Sagesse
- 2010–2012: Anibal Zahle
- 2012–2013: Al Mouttahed Tripoli
- 2013–2015: Al Riyadi
- 2015–2016: Club Sagesse
- 2016–2017: Al Riyadi
- 2018: CS Antonine
Medals
Men's basketball
Representing Lebanon
FIBA Asia Championship
Silver medal – second place	2007 Tokushima	Team

Roy Nicolas Samaha (born 12 September 1984 in Zahlé) is a retired (from the 1st division) Lebanese professional basketball player. He was a key player in the Lebanon national basketball team and participated lately in the 2006 FIBA World Championship, FIBA Asia Championship 2007 and FIBA World Olympic Qualifying Tournament for Men 2008.

== Early years ==
Samaha started his basketball career in 2000 when he was recruited by Sagesse, one of the leading basketball teams in Lebanon. He joined Sagesse and made his way to the first team in the end of 1999.

== Professional sports career ==
=== Sagesse (Hekmeh) Years (1999-2004) ===
Samaha played with Hekmeh BC (Sagesse) team for 4 consecutive seasons where he helped his team win four Lebanese Basketball League championships, three Lebanese Cups and for the first time in Lebanon's history, two FIBA Asia Champions Cup titles in 2000 and 2004.

=== Blue Stars Years (2005-2007) ===
Samaha transferred to the Blue Stars team for three consecutive seasons. He played as a starter.

=== Mouttahed (2007-2009) ===
Following his time with the Blue Stars, Samaha joined the newly promoted to Division A Al Mouttahed Tripoli team. Samaha averaged 10 points and 10 rebounds a game and led his team to the semi-finals and caused an upset by beating his former team and one of the favorites to win the championship.. Al Mouttahed Tripoli lost in the finals to Sporting Al Riyadi Beirut, which had been unbeaten that season, 3 games to 1.

=== Sagesse (2009-2010) ===
After his injury, Samaha rejoined his former team the green castle Hekmeh BC (Sagesse). He finished with 11.5 points per game and about 10 rebounds per game.

=== Anibal Zahle (2010-2012) ===
After a summer with the national team, Samaha joined his city club Anibal Zahle. Anibal Zahle won the Dubai Championship 2011, and the club managed to grab second in the Lebanese Championship after defeating Riyadi.

=== Mouttahed (2012-2013) ===
Samaha returned to Mouttahed in 2012 under coach Jean-Denys Choulet.

== Honors and awards ==
- Lebanese Cup Winner -01, 02, 03
- Lebanese League Champion -01, 02, 03, 04,15,17
- Asian Club Championships -01, 04(winner), 07 (Quarterfinals)
- Lebanese U18 National Team -01
- West Asian championship (junior) 1st place -01
- Lebanese National Team -02-08
- World Championships -02, 06
- WABA Cup -04
- Lebanese U20 National Team -04
- Asian U20 Championships in Tehran (Iran) - 04
- WABA Championships in Tehran -04
- Lebanese Cup Semifinals -06
- World Championships in Japan -06: 5 games: 4.6ppg, 3.8rpg
- Asian Games in Doha -06
- Lebanese League Finalist -07, 08
- William Jones Cup Tournament -07
- Asia-Basket.com All-Lebanese League Most Improved Player of the Year -08
- Asia-Basket.com All-Lebanese League Honorable Mention -08

== Personal ==
Samaha graduated from the Lebanese American University (Byblos) with high distinction. Prior to joining Moutahed Tripoli in 2007, Samaha played in France with Paris Basket Racing.
