= Hussein Tawbe =

Lebanese basketball player (born 1982)

Medal record

Men's basketball

Representing Lebanon

FIBA Asia Championship
| Silver medal – second place | 2007 Tokushima | Team |

Hussein Tawbe (born 16 July 1982) is a former Lebanese basketball player. Tawbe was a member of the Lebanon national basketball team, with whom he competed at the 2006 FIBA World Championship and FIBA Asia Championship 2007.
