= Yaseen Musa =

Qatari basketball player (born 1980)

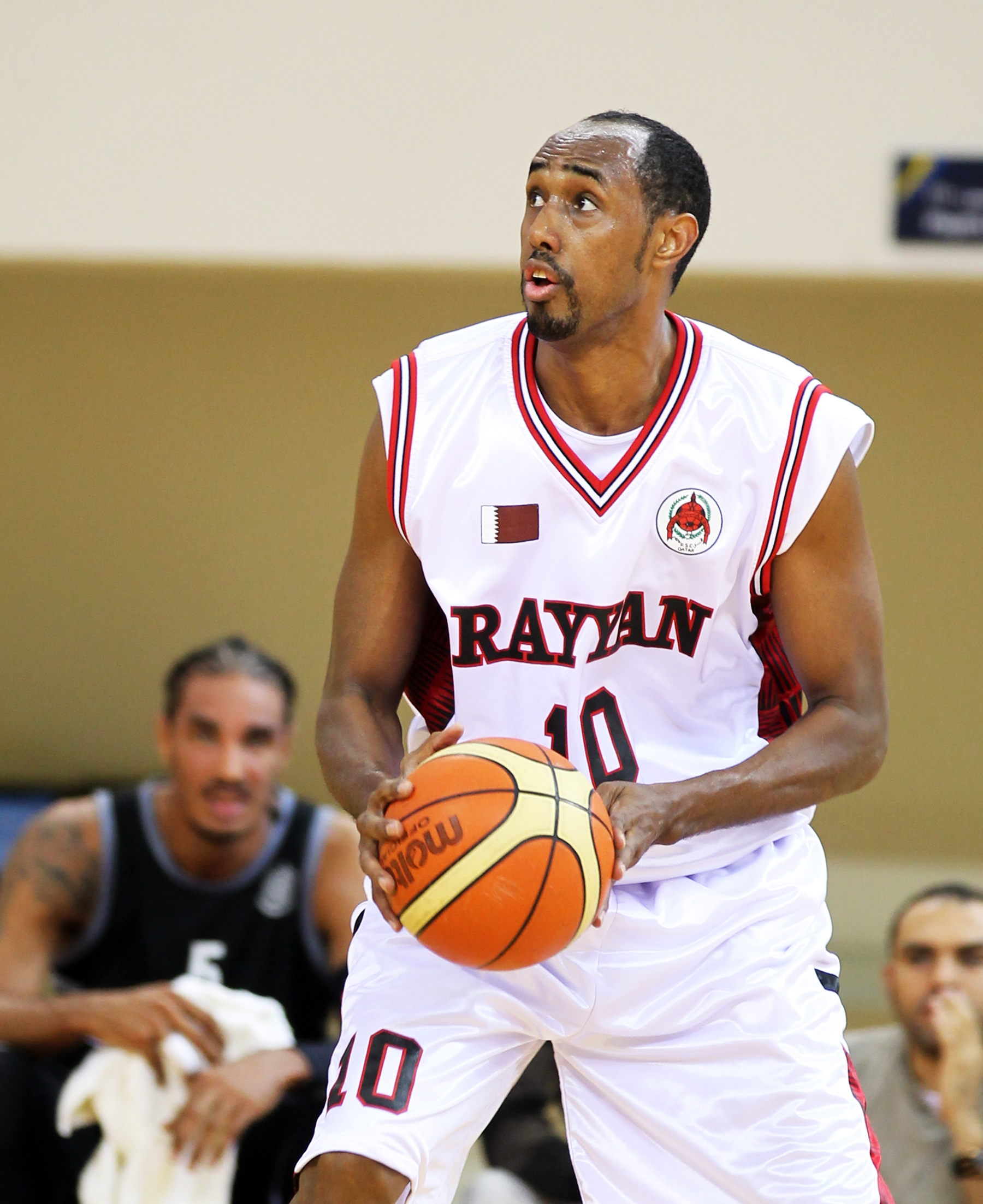
- Musa in 2012

Personal information
- Born: August 12, 1980 (age 46) Qatar
- Listed height: 6 ft 8 in (2.03 m)

Career information
- Playing career: 1997–2016
- Position: Forward

Career history
- 1997–2016: Al-Rayyan
Medals
Representing Qatar
Men's basketball
Asian Games
Silver medal – second place	2006 Doha	Team
Men's 3x3 basketball
World championships
Gold medal – first place	2014 Moscow	Team
Asian championships
Gold medal – first place	2013 Doha	Team

Yaseen Ismail Musa (Arabic: ياسين إسماعيل موسى; born August 12, 1980) is a former professional basketball player. He was also a member of the Qatar national basketball team.

Musa competed for the Qatar national basketball team at the 2007 and FIBA Asia Championship 2009. Previously he competed for the junior national team at the 1999 FIBA World Championship for Junior Men and 2001 FIBA World Championship for Young Men. At the 1999 tournament, he averaged a tournament-best 25 points per game, ahead of future NBA players Andrei Kirilenko and Juan Carlos Navarro and was the second leading rebounder with 12.4 rebounds per game.

Musa announced his international retirement after Qatar's sixth-placed finish at the FIBA Asia Championship in Manila, The Philippines. However, he is set to continue at this club Al Rayyan for at least two more seasons. In 2014 he was part of the Qatari team that won the FIBA 3x3 World Championships.
