= Andrie Ekayana =

Indonesian basketball player

Personal information
- Born: 31 July 1982 (age 44) Malang, Indonesia
- Listed height: 1.83 m (6 ft 0 in)

Career information
- High school: SMAN 2 Malang
- College: Narotama Surabaya University
- Playing career: 2000–2018
- Position: Point guard / shooting guard
- Coaching career: 2019–present

Career history

Playing
- 2000-2005: Bima Sakti Malang
- 2005-2010: Aspac Jakarta
- 2010-2014: CLS Knights
- 2014-2017: Hangtuah Sumsel IM
- 2017-2018: Pelita Jaya

Coaching
- 2019: Kolese Saint Yusuf High School
- 2020: Indonesia Elite Muda
- 2024-present: Indonesia Women
- 2024-2025: Indonesia U-18

Career highlights
- NBL Indonesia Sportmanship Award (2015); IBL All-Defensive Team (2005); Kobatama All-Star (2001)
Medals
Men's basketball
Representing Indonesia
Southeast Asian Games
| Silver medal – second place | 2015 Singapore | Team |
| Silver medal – second place | 2007 Nakhon Ratchasima | Team |

Andrie "Yayan" Ekayana Satya Santosa (born July 31, 1982) is an Indonesian coach and former professional basketball player who last played for Pelita Jaya of the Indonesian Basketball League (IBL).

== Professional career ==
From Malang, Andrie has played with Bima Sakti Malang ever since he was a kid. He also represented East Java at Pekan Olahraga Nasional in 2000 at Surabaya, and won them the gold medal.

Andrie debuted at the highest level of Indonesian basketball, Kobatama in 2000. In that same year, Andrie was selected as an All-Star.

In 2010, Andrie joined CLS Knights of Surabaya, but didn't play that much due to his injury of on the knee. Took a whole season to fully heal. He returned on the 2011–12 NBL Indonesia season, and instantly became they're star player.

Andrie then left the Knights after his contract ended. He wanted to retire, but Hangtuah Sumsel pursued, and he played for them in 2014-2015, and IBL 2015-2016 and IBL 2016-2017. Andrie joined the 1,000 point club in the NBL Indonesia.

Andrie's joins Pelita Jaya Bakrie, even if he had a history of injuries, head coach Johannis Winar said that Andrie has the capabilities was higher than any young player on the team, eventhough he's over 30 years old.

== National team career ==
Andrie represented Indonesia in 2007 SEA Games and 2015 SEA Games in Singapore. In both of those competisions, he won the silver medal for Indonesia.

== Coaching career ==
Andrie coached his high school team for his first coaching gig. Kolese Santo Yusuf played in the Development Basketball League (DBL) at the East Java series.
