= Saad Abdulrahman =

Qatari basketball player (born 1985)

Personal information
- Born: 2 May 1985 (age 41) Doha, Qatar
- Listed height: 6 ft 4 in (1.93 m)

Career information
- Playing career: 2005–2016
- Position: Point guard

Career history
- 2005–2007: Al-Sadd
- 2007–2010: Al-Rayyan
- 2011–2016: Al-Sadd
Medals
Men's basketball
Representing Qatar
FIBA Asia Championship
Bronze medal – third place	2003 Harbin	Team
Bronze medal – third place	2005 Doha	Team
Asian Games
Silver medal – second place	2006 Doha	Team

Saad Abdulrahman Ali (born 2 May 1985) is a former professional basketball player. He played for Al-Sadd of the Qatar Basketball League. He was also a member of the Qatar national basketball team.

Saad competed for the Qatar national basketball team at the 2005 2007 and FIBA Asia Championship 2009. He also competed for Qatar at their only FIBA World Championship performance to date, in 2006, where he averaged 12.8 points and 2.4 assists per game.

In 2009, Abdulrahman had his best individual international tournament to date, averaging 17.8 points per game for the Qataris. He finished in the top ten leaders in points, minutes and steals per game en route to being named to the All-Tournament third team. However, despite his efforts, Qatar finished sixth in the tournament and failed to qualify for their second consecutive FIBA World Championship.
