= Shinsuke Kashiwagi =

Japanese basketball player

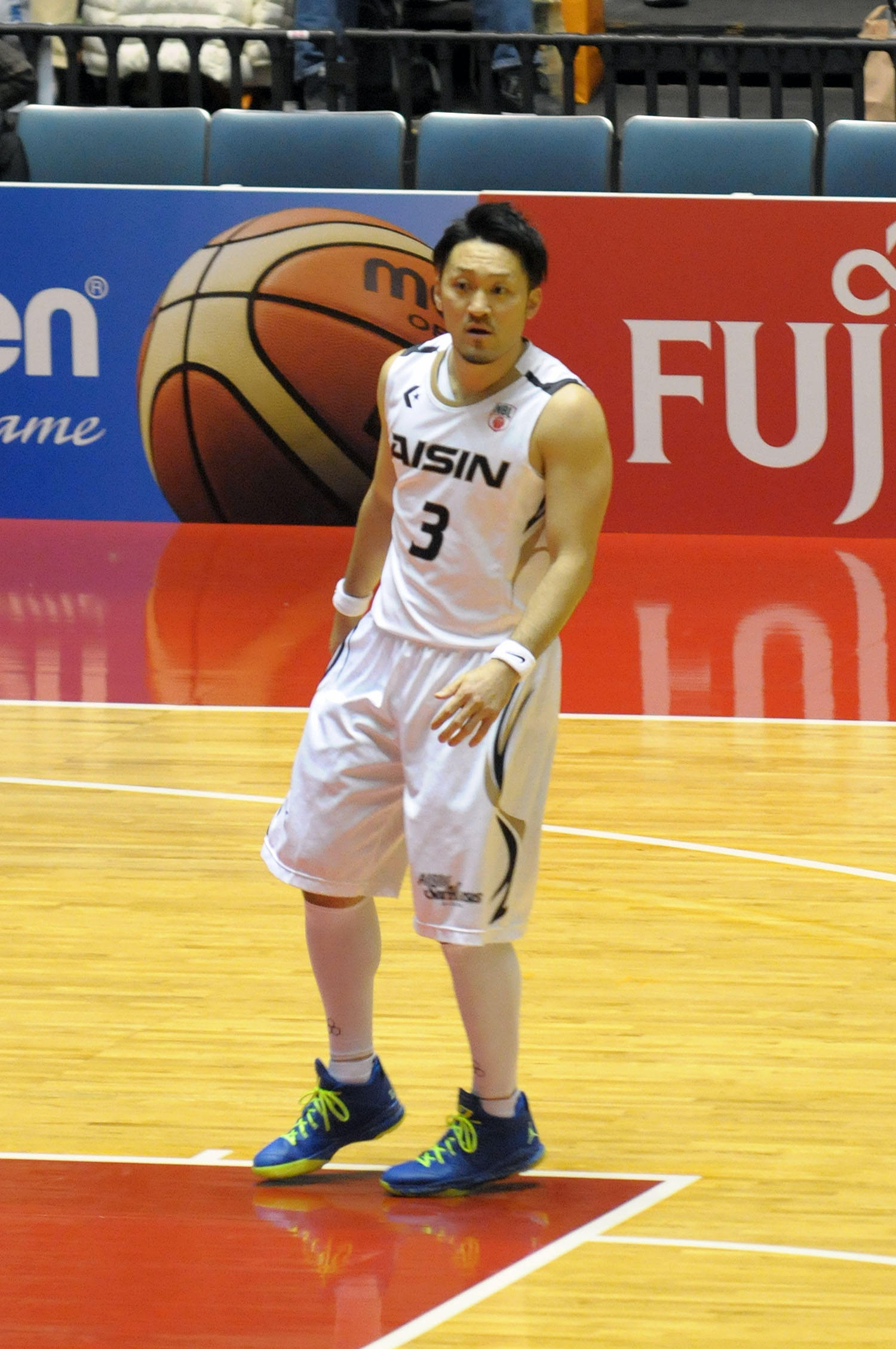

No. 3 – SeaHorses Mikawa
- Position: Guard
- League: B.League

Personal information
- Born: December 22, 1981 (age 44) Obihiro, Hokkaido, Japan
- Listed height: 6 ft 0 in (1.83 m)
- Listed weight: 176 lb (80 kg)

Career information
- High school: Tokai University 4 High
- College: Chuo University
- Playing career: 2004–present

Career history
- 2004–2006: Sun Rockers Shibuya
- 2006–2017: SeaHorses Mikawa
- 2017–2018: Nagoya Diamond Dolphins
- 2018–2020: Niigata Albirex BB
- 2020–present: SeaHorses Mikawa
Medals
Men's basketball
Representing Japan
FIBA Asia Championship
Silver medal – second place	2009 Tianjin	Team competition

Shinsuke Kashiwagi (柏木 真介、born December 22, 1981) is a Japanese professional basketball player. He plays for the SeaHorses Mikawa of the B.League. Kashiwagi was a member of the Japan national basketball team. He played for the team in the 2006 FIBA World Championship and the FIBA Asia Championship 2007 and FIBA Asia Championship 2009.

In the 2009-10 season, Kashiwagi entered the month-long winter break averaging 13.7 points and 3.5 assists per game for the Seahorses. He was named to the West squad for the 2009-10 JBL Super League All-Star game.
