= Enver Soobzokov =

Jordanian basketball player

Personal information
- Born: May 3, 1978 (age 48) Laguna Beach, California
- Listed height: 6 ft 6 in (1.98 m)
- Listed weight: 195 lb (88 kg)
- Position: Small forward
Medals
Men's basketball
Representing Jordan
FIBA Asia Championship
Bronze medal – third place	2009 Tianjin	Team

Enver Soobzokov (Arabic: انفر شوابسوقه; Russian: Энвер Сообзоков; born May 3, 1978) is a Jordanian professional basketball player of Circassian descent. He plays for ASU of the Jordanian basketball league. He also is a member of the Jordan national basketball team.

Soobzokov competed with the Jordanian team at the FIBA Asia Championship 2007 and FIBA Asia Championship 2009. In 2009, Soobzokov helped the Jordanian team to a national best third-place finish by averaging 4.1 points per game and playing strong defense off the bench for the team.
