= Lo Yi Ting =

Hong Kong basketball player

Lo Yi Ting (羅意庭)
South China AA
- Position: Shooting guard
- League: Hong Kong A1 Division

Personal information
- Born: 14 November 1987 (age 39) Shenzhen, China
- Listed height: 5 ft 9 in (1.75 m)
- Listed weight: 70 kg (154 lb)

Career information
- High school: Diocesan Boys' School

Lo Yi Ting (Chinese: 羅意庭, born 14 November 1987) is a Hong Kong professional basketball player for Hong Kong A1 Division Championship club South China AA.

Lo Yi Ting started playing basketball when he was 8 years old and by 12 he was selected in the Nike League in Hong Kong. He went to Diocesan Boys' School and became a member of the school team. He played in Hong Kong's A1 Division Basketball league as a high schooler in 2004.

== South China AA ==
After that he joined South China AA and became their main defender. In 2008 he helped South China win the Straits Cup and winning the Most Valuable Player accolade for himself.

In 2010 he helped South China win the Cup again and won himself the MVP award again. His performance caught the eye of Fujian Xunxing and the team invited him for a trial. The transfer was confirmed in October 2010 and he became a professional basketball player. He is the fourth Hong Kong player to play in the Chinese league.

== Fujian Xunxing ==
He made his debut for his new team on 10 December 2010, away to Zhejiang Lions . He scored 5 points and made 3 assists, but it was not enough as Fujian Xunxing lost 100-121.
