= Bassem Balaa =

Lebanese basketball player

No. 8 – Retired
- Position: Forward
- League: Lebanese Basketball League

Personal information
- Born: July 10, 1981 (age 45) Beirut, Lebanon
- Listed height: 1.95 m (6 ft 5 in)
- Listed weight: 100 kg (220 lb)

Career information
- Playing career: 1997–present

Bassem Balaa, born July 10, 1981, in Beirut Lebanon, is a retired Lebanese professional basketball player He has also represented the Lebanon national basketball team that participated in the 2002 FIBA World Championship in Indianapolis and the 2006 FIBA World Championship in Japan. Bassem has played for various clubs within Lebanon, including Sporting Al Riyadi Beirut and Achrafieh side Hekmeh BC.
