= Lee Dong-jun (basketball) =

South Korean basketball player

Personal information
- Born: 27 January 1980 (age 46)
- Listed height: 6 ft 5 in (1.96 m)

Career information
- College: University Of Portland (1999–2000); Seattle Pacific (2000–2002)
- Position: Forward

Career history
- 2007–2012: Daegu Orions
- 2012–2015: Seoul Samsung Thunders
- 2015–2016: Seoul SK Knights
- 2016–2016: Alab Pilipinas (disbanded 2020)
Medals
Men's basketball
Representing South Korea
FIBA Asia Championship
Bronze medal – third place	2007 Japan	Team

- Lee Dong-jun
- Hangul: 이동준
- Hanja: 李東俊
- RR: I Dongjun
- MR: I Tongjun

Lee Dong-jun (born Daniel Sandrin; 27 January 1980) is an American-born South Korean basketball player.

== Career ==
Lee began his basketball career playing for the University of Portland in the 1998–1999 season, appearing in eight games and scoring an average of 1 points. He transferred to Seattle Pacific University in 2000. After his graduation, he went on to play on professional teams in Luxembourg and Germany before coming to South Korea in 2006.

In South Korea, Lee joined Yonsei University's team in March 2006. Lee's participation in university basketball was controversial because he was not a South Korean citizen and he had previously played in professional leagues in Europe. Even after he naturalised, Korea University continued to object to his participation due to his professional experience; after he was ruled ineligible, a physical altercation broke out at a September 2006 match between Yonsei University and Korea University. Coming to South Korea was a difficult adjustment for Lee in terms of culture and language. Philippine Olympic Committee president Monico Puentevella stated in media interviews that Sandrin had told him "he couldn’t relate with the Koreans because they hardly speak English … he felt more comfortable with our team. Nevertheless, Lee stated that he relished the opportunity to live in the country and learn more about his roots.

Lee would go on to play professionally in the Korean Basketball League for the Daegu Orions. He later moved to the Seoul Samsung Thunders. In January 2013 he and elder brother Lee Seung-jun were booked on assault charges in Mapo District, leading to controversy over whether they should be permitted to play in the then-ongoing KBL All-Star Games.

On 21 November 2016, it was announced that Lee would serve as one of two Alab Pilipinas' world imports together with his brother Lee Seung-jun.

On December 2016, the Lee Dong-jun alongside his brother was removed from the team due to inadequate performance.

== Personal life ==
Lee was born into a basketball family: his father was an avid player, and taught the game to Lee's older brother and then to Lee himself. He graduated from Bothell High School in 1998 before going on to the University of Portland and then Seattle Pacific University. He naturalised as a South Korean citizen in June 2006, relinquishing his U.S. citizenship in the process. His elder brother Eric Sandrin followed him to South Korea and in 2009 also naturalised as a South Korean citizen, changing his name to Lee Seung-jun.

== See also ==
- List of former United States citizens who relinquished their nationality
