= Ayman Adais =

Jordanian basketball player (born 1978)

Orthodox
- Position: Center
- League: Jordanian Premier Basketball League

Personal information
- Born: June 28, 1978 (age 48) Jordan
- Listed height: 6 ft 10 in (2.08 m)
- Listed weight: 231 lb (105 kg)
Medals
Men's basketball
Representing Jordan
FIBA Asia Championship
Bronze medal – third place	2009 Tianjin	Team

Ayman Adais (born June 28, 1978), also Ayman Idais, is a retired professional basketball player who last played for the Jordanian team Zain.

Adais competed with the Jordanian team in the FIBA Asia Championship when it was held in 2007 and 2009, where he averaged 10.9 points and therefore raised the Jordanian team's points to 4.3. Due to this his team came third place (a national first) and qualified to compete in the 2010 FIBA World Championship (its first contest of this kind), where Adais was present.
