= Zaid Al-Khas =

Jordanian basketball player

Personal information
- Born: March 7, 1976 (age 50) Jordan
- Listed height: 6 ft 9 in (2.06 m)

Career information
- College: Buffalo (1996–1998)
- Position: Center / power forward

Career history
- 2010–2011: Qingdao DoubleStar

Zaid Al-Khas (also written Alkhas; born March 7, 1976) is a Jordanian former professional basketball player. He started his career with Al Ahli club of Jordan.

He played professionally in Lebanon 2001/2002 season with (Tadamon Club). 2002/2003 in Egypt (Gazira). He played for Aramex Jordan (2003-2006). Zain Jordan (2006-2009) in the JBL (Jordan Basketball League). He played for the Chinese basketball club Qingdao DoubleStar in the CBA 2010/2011. He was a member and also the captain of the Jordan national basketball team from 1997 to 2011.

He was awarded the Top Scorer in Asia championship Harbin China 2003 (23.5 pts per game). Best Arab player in 2006. Best power forward in Asia 2006. William Jones Cup 2008 MVP

he announced his international retirement in 2011 after the end of 2011 Wuhan crowned with the silver medal as the best achievement for the Jordanian basketball in Asian tournaments.

He is currently the assistant coach for the Jordan national basketball team 2019 that made it to the FIBA World Cup in China 2019 FIBAWC. He is the only Basketball player from Jordan to ever make it to 3 Basketball World Cups: the 1995 World Cup under 18 in Greece, the 2010 World Cup in Turkey and the 2019 World Cup in China (as coach).

== Career ==
AlKhas competed with the Jordanian team at the 2003 ABC Championship, FIBA Asia Championship 2007 and FIBA Asia Championship 2009 FIBA Asia championship 2011. Previously, he competed with the team at the 1995 World Championship for Junior Men, averaging 14.4 points and 10 rebounds per game. From 1998 to 2000, Al-Khas competed collegiately at Gannon university in Erie, Pennsylvania, In 2009, Al-Khas helped the Jordanian team to a national best third-place finish and a qualification to the World Cup 2010 for the first time in Jordan history. 2011 he helped team Jordan win the silver medal in Asia cup 2011 as the best finish in the country history in Basketball. He retired internationally from the national team of Jordan right after that tournament. He is the only Basketball player from Asia to take part in 7 Asian Cup tournaments from (1995-2011)
