= Islam Abbas =

Palestinian-Jordanian basketball player

ASU Sports Club
- Position: Power forward
- League: Jordanian Premier League

Personal information
- Born: March 11, 1980 (age 46) Palestine
- Listed height: 6 ft 6 3/4 in (2.00 m)
- Listed weight: 245 lb (111 kg)
Medals
Men's basketball
Representing Jordan
FIBA Asia Championship
| Bronze medal – third place | 2009 Tianjin | Team |

Islam Abbas (born March 11, 1980) is a Palestinian-Jordanian professional basketball player. He is a member of the Jordan national basketball team.

Abbaas competed with the Jordanian team at the FIBA Asia Championship 2007 and FIBA Asia Championship 2009. In 2009, Abbaas helped the Jordanian team to a national best third-place finish by averaging 4.6 points and 5.4 rebounds per game.

Although Abbaas saw limited action off the bench for most of the 2009 tournament, he scored 23 points and grabbed a tournament-high 19 rebounds in only 23 minutes of action in a first round 105–47 win over Indonesia.
