= Chen Hsin-an =

Taiwanese basketball player

Chen Hsin-An
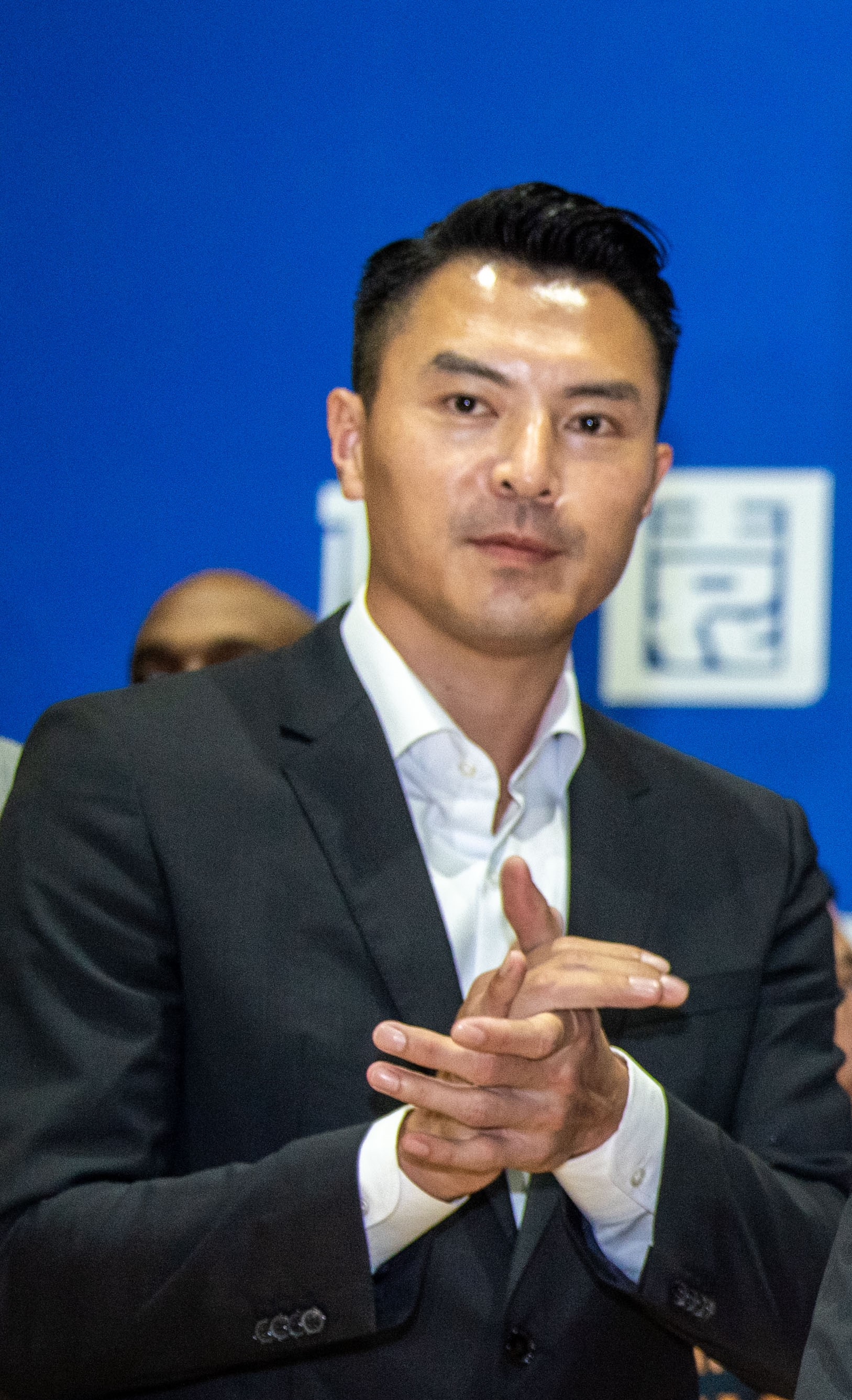

Personal information
- Born: July 1, 1980 (age 46) Taipei City, Taiwan
- Listed height: 6 ft 5 in (1.96 m)
- Listed weight: 200 lb (91 kg)

Career information
- High school: Taipei Municipal Song-Shan Senior High School
- College: Taipei Physical Education College
- Playing career: 1998–2013
- Position: Small forward / shooting guard

Career history
- 1998–1999: Bank of Taiwan
- 2000–2009: Yulon Dinos
- 2004: Orange County Buzz
- 2005: Long Beach Jam
- 2009–2011: Dongguan New Century Leopards
- 2011–2013: Taoyuan Pauian Archiland
Medals
Men's basketball
Representing Chinese Taipei
FIBA Asia Challenge
Bronze medal – third place	2004 Taipei
East Asian Games
Silver medal – second place	2001 Osaka

Chen Hsin-An (陳信安; born July 1, 1980), also known as Sean Chen, is a former professional basketball player from Taiwan. He played small forward in Taiwan, while adjusting to play shooting guard in leagues where there are bigger lineups.

== Early life ==
Chen was born in Taipei, Taiwan. He initially played handball when he attended Tian Mu Junior High School. He began playing basketball after he entered Taipei Municipal Song Shan Senior High School, where his talents showed early, winning the HBL (High School Basketball League) tournament in his freshman year. On 4 April 1998, he won a dunking contest at an Asian invitational while representing Taiwan. Chen attended Taipei Physical Education College.

== Career ==
Chen helped the Bank of Taiwan (BoT) team win the Taiwan Amateur League (A-League) title in 2000 against the then-dominating Yulon Dinos. He was subsequently recalled by Yulon who initially signed him and allowed him to play for the BoT, and formally became a Yulon Dino. Named the first most valuable player (MVP) for the championship series of the new-born Super Basketball League (SBL), Chen led Yulon to back-to-back championships in 2004 and 2005 as the primary scorer of the team.

Having been regarded as one of the most talented players in Asia, Chen was the scoring champion of men's basketball in the 2001 East Asian Games where his team Chinese Taipei won the silver medal. He also participated in the National Basketball Association's (NBA's) preseason games and Summer League in 2002 and 2003 during off season. While helping Yulon repeat the SBL championship, Chen also set out to pursue a new career in the United States, although he did not succeed in getting into the NBA. Instead, he appeared briefly on two teams of the American Basketball Association (ABA) between 2004 and 2005 where he played shooting guard and concentrated on long-range shooting.

Since 2005, Chen has suffered from sporadic ligament injuries in his left knee and has therefore missed several opportunities to play abroad or to represent his country in international tournaments. Despite winning his first regular-season MVP award and scoring champion title in the SBL in the 2007-2008 season as he resumed to play for Yulon, Chen failed to lead his team back to championship as he promised. After such disappointment, he announced a decision to seek breakthrough in the Chinese Basketball Association (CBA) of the People's Republic of China. Despite possible penalties warned by Taiwan's official basketball association, Chen Hsin-An became a player of the CBA's Dongguan Leopards in 2009 until 2011.

On 16 November 2013, the opening day for the 11th season of SBL, Chen announced his retirement.

== See also ==
- Chinese Taipei
- Super Basketball League
