= Joe Vogel (basketball) =

American-Lebanese basketball player (born 1973)

Personal information
- Born: September 15, 1973 (age 53) North Platte, Nebraska, U.S.
- Listed height: 6 ft 11 in (2.11 m)
- Listed weight: 265 lb (120 kg)

Career information
- High school: North Platte (North Platte, Nebraska)
- College: Colorado State (1992–1996)
- NBA draft: 1996: 2nd round, 45th overall pick
- Drafted by: Seattle SuperSonics
- Playing career: 1996–2018
- Position: Center
- Number: 41

Career history
- 1996–1997: Galatasaray Café Crown
- 1997–1998: Red Wolves
- 1998–1999: Al-Ittihad
- 1999–2000: Sagesse
- 2000–2001: Rockford Lightning
- 2001–2002: Champville SC
- 2003: Xinjiang Flying Tigers
- 2003: Arecibo Captains
- 2003–2004: Champville SC
- 2004–2013: Sporting Al Riyadi Beirut
- 2013–2015: Homenetmen Beirut
- 2015–2016: Byblos Club
- 2017–2018: Hoops Club
- Stats at Basketball Reference
Medals
Men's basketball
Representing Lebanon
FIBA Asia Championship
Silver medal – second place	2001 Shanghai	Team
Silver medal – second place	2005 Doha	Team
Silver medal – second place	2007 Tokushima	Team

Joseph Vogel (Arabic: جو فوغل; born September 15, 1973) is an American-Lebanese former basketball player.

Vogel attended Colorado State University. Upon graduation, he was drafted by the Seattle SuperSonics in 1996. He played as a professional in Taiwan, Turkey, Japan, Saudi Arabia and on a number of Lebanese basketball teams, including Sagesse Beirut, Champville SC and Sporting Al Riyadi Beirut.

After his naturalization as a Lebanese citizen, he also became a member of the Lebanese national basketball team. At 6'11", he was Lebanon's starting center.

== College ==
Vogel attended Colorado State and was ranked second in blocked shots with 180 and 7th all time in games played, with 115 to his credit.

== Professional teams ==
Vogel was drafted with the 45th overall pick by the Seattle SuperSonics in the 1996 NBA draft.

After Seattle, Vogel joined Turkey's basketball Galatasaray Café Crown for the 1996–97 season. He was, however, replaced by Mills during that season. In 1997, he signed with the Red Wolves basketball team in Japan, and returned to the Seattle SuperSonics at their summer camp to train. Al-Ittihad was Vogel's next stop, in Saudi Arabia for the 1998–99 season.

Vogel arrived to the Lebanon Leprechauns for the 1999–2000 season and signed with Sagesse Beirut. He also took part of some tournaments in the United States in 2000 and 2001. His return to Lebanon gave him the chance to join the Champville basketball team under a five-year contract.

Vogel was part of the Sporting Al Riyadi Beirut basketball team from 2004 until 2013. He won various local championships with Al Riyadi and across Asia. Vogel then played for Homenetmen Beirut, Byblos Club and Hoops Club.

== Awards and achievements ==
- Western Athletic Conference All-Tournament Team −95
- Saudi Arabian League Champion −99
- WAC 2nd Team -Pre96
- Lebanese League Champion −00, 05, 06, 07,08,09,2010.
- MVP of the Asian Cup tournament −99
- Lebanese National Team −01, 03, 05–07
- Mediterranean Games in Tunisia −01
- World Championships in Indianapolis (USA) -02
- Dubai Tournament Winner −04.
- Lebanese Cup Winner −04, 06, 07, 2015.
- Lebanese League Regular Season Champion −04, 05, 06, 07
- Asia-Basket.com Lebanese League All-Domestic Players Team −04, 05, 06
- Asia-Basket.com Lebanese League All-Defensive Team −04, 05
- Asia-Basket.com All-Lebanese League Center of the Year −05
- Asia-Basket.com All-Lebanese League Domestic Player of the Year −05
- Asia-Basket.com All-Lebanese League 1st Team −05
- Arab Club Championships −05 (Silver, Asia-Basket All-1st Team), 06 (Winner), 07 (Winner)
- World Championships in Japan −06
- Asian Games in Doha
- Asia-Basket.com All-Arab Club Championships 2nd Team

== See also ==
- Lebanon national basketball team
- Sporting Al Riyadi Beirut
