= 1999 FIBA Under-19 World Championship =

1999 FIBA Under-19 Basketball World Cup
Tournament details
- Host country: Portugal
- Dates: 15–25 July
- Teams: 16 (from 5 federations)
- Venues: 5 (in 5 host cities)

Final positions
- Champions: Spain (1st title)

Tournament statistics
- MVP: (Russia) Andrei Kirilenko
- Top scorer: (Qatar) Yasseen Musa (25.0)
- Top rebounds: (Nigeria) Olumide Oyedeji (13.0)
- Top assists: (Venezuela) Manuel Berroteran (5.0)
- PPG (Team): United States (91.6)
- RPG (Team): Qatar (42.2)
- APG (Team): Japan (11.3)

Official website
- 1999 FIBA U19 World Championship

The 1999 FIBA Under-19 World Championship (Portuguese: Campeonato Mundial Sub-19 da FIBA de 1999) was the 6th edition of the FIBA U19 World Championship. It was held in multiple cities in Portugal, with the later rounds held in the capital city of Lisbon, from 15 to 25 July 1999. Spain won their first championship in the tournament, by defeating the United States, 94–87 in the Gold Medal Game. Croatia notched their first-ever podium finish, after defeating Argentina 66–59, in the Bronze Medal Game. Andrei Kirilenko of Russia, was named the tournament MVP.

== Venues ==
Location	City	Round
1999 FIBA Under-19 World Championship is located in Portugal	Lisbon	Second and knockout stages
1999 FIBA Under-19 World Championship is located in Portugal	Porto	Preliminary stage
1999 FIBA Under-19 World Championship is located in Portugal	Aveiro	Preliminary stage
1999 FIBA Under-19 World Championship is located in Portugal	Almada	Preliminary stage
1999 FIBA Under-19 World Championship is located in Portugal	Faro	Preliminary stage

== Qualified teams ==
Means of Qualification	Dates	Venue	Berths	Qualifiers
Host Nation	—	—	1	Portugal
Defending Champions	12–22 July 1995	(Greece) Athens	1	Greece
1998 FIBA Under-18 African Championship	27 August – 3 September 1998	(Egypt) Alexandria	2	Nigeria; Egypt
1998 FIBA Under-18 Americas Championship	5–11 July 1998	(Dominican Republic) Puerto Plata	4	United States; Argentina; Brazil; Venezuela
1998 FIBA Under-18 Asian Championship	5–13 November 1998	(India) Kolkata	3	China; Qatar; Japan
1998 FIBA Under-18 European Championship	3–12 July 1998	(Bulgaria) Varna	4	Spain; Croatia; Latvia; Russia
1998 FIBA Under-18 Oceania Championship	—	—	1	Australia
Total			16	

== Preliminary round ==
=== Group A ===
Pos	Team	Pld	W	L	PF	PA	PD	Pts	Qualification
1	Spain	3	3	0	263	219	+44	6	Quarterfinal round
2	Brazil	3	2	1	240	231	+9	5	Quarterfinal round
3	Latvia	3	1	2	215	248	−33	4	Classification Round
4	Nigeria	3	0	3	195	215	−20	3	Classification Round

Source: FIBA
Rules for classification: 1) points; 2) head-to-head points difference.

15 July 1999
15:30

Boxscore

Nigeria	65–69	Latvia
Scoring by half: 40–28, 25–41
Pts: Oyedeji 15; Rebs: Eze 13; Asts: Oboh, Ideh, Oyedeji 1		Pts: Ļaksa 16; Rebs: Cipruss 11; Asts: Jumikis 2

Porto

15 July 1999
17:30

Boxscore

Spain	91–83	Brazil
Scoring by half: 46–40, 45–43
Pts: Navarro 21; Rebs: Reyes 12; Asts: Navarro, López 2		Pts: Moura 23; Rebs: Moura 10; Asts: Moura 2

Porto

16 July 1999
15:30

Boxscore

Brazil	72–67	Nigeria
Scoring by half: 34–29, 38–38
Pts: Faggeane, Brügger 16; Rebs: Valentin 6 Asts: Moura 3		Pts: Oyedeji 21; Rebs: Oyedeji 15; Asts: Odaudu 4

Porto

16 July 1999
17:30

Boxscore

Latvia	73–98	Spain
Scoring by half: 31–44, 42–54
Pts: Vaikulis 17; Rebs: Grafs 13; Asts: Valters 2		Pts: Navarro 14; Rebs: Gabriel, Gasol 6 Asts: Navarro, Gonzalez 2

Porto

17 July 1999
15:30

Boxscore

Nigeria	63–74	Spain
Scoring by half: 27–38, 36–36
Pts: Jibril 24; Rebs: Oyedeji 8 Asts: Odaudu 4		Pts: López 22; Rebs: Reyes 13; Asts: Rodríguez 3

Porto

17 July 1999
17:30

Boxscore

Brazil	85–73	Latvia
Scoring by half: 43–41, 42–32
Pts: Faggeane 26; Rebs: Giovannoni 9 Asts: Giovannoni 3		Pts: Ļaksa 26; Rebs: Grafs 6 Asts: Valters 4

Porto

=== Group B ===
Pos	Team	Pld	W	L	PF	PA	PD	Pts	Qualification
1	United States	3	3	0	307	199	+108	6	Quarterfinal round
2	Greece	3	2	1	298	231	+67	5	Quarterfinal round
3	Egypt	3	1	2	201	267	−66	4	Classification Round
4	China	3	0	3	197	306	−109	3	Classification Round

Source: FIBA
Rules for classification: 1) points; 2) head-to-head points difference.

15 July 1999
19:30

Boxscore

Egypt	66–106	Greece
Scoring by half: 29–47, 37–59
Pts: Abdel-Bary 11; Rebs: Badran 8 Asts: Hussein, Abdel-Bary, El-Kirdani 1		Pts: Diamantopoulos 27; Rebs: Papadopoulos 13; Asts: Papadopoulos 3

Almada

15 July 1999
21:30

Boxscore

United States	119–59	China
Scoring by half: 71–20, 48–39
Pts: C. Williams 18; Rebs: C. Williams 6 Asts: Logan 4		Pts: Yue 13; Rebs: Jia 4 Asts: Wang 5

Almada

16 July 1999
19:30

Boxscore

China	65–82	Egypt
Scoring by half: 36–46, 29–36
Pts: Yue 18; Rebs: Jiao 6 Asts: Liu 5		Pts: Fanan 20; Rebs: El-Sehrty 10; Asts: Abdel-Bary 5

Almada

16 July 1999
21:30

Boxscore

Greece	87–92	United States
Scoring by half: 43–48, 44–44
Pts: Diamantopoulos 26; Rebs: Fotsis 8 Asts: Fotsis 2		Pts: Wright 28; Rebs: Wright 9 Asts: Dooling 5

Almada

17 July 1999
19:30

Boxscore

Egypt	53–96	United States
Scoring by half: 29–48, 24–48
Pts: Abdel-Bary 14; Rebs: Sarhan 8 Asts: Fanan 2		Pts: Lepore 13; Rebs: Parker 7 Asts: Logan 4

Almada

17 July 1999
21:30

Boxscore

China	73–105	Greece
Scoring by half: 40–55, 33–50
Pts: Mo, Jia 16; Rebs: Mo 4 Asts: Liu 6		Pts: Petropoulos 18; Rebs: Fotsis 10; Asts: Papamakarios 4

Almada

=== Group C ===
Pos	Team	Pld	W	L	PF	PA	PD	Pts	Qualification
1	Croatia	3	3	0	207	175	+32	6	Quarterfinal round
2	Argentina	3	2	1	223	199	+24	5	Quarterfinal round
3	Qatar	3	1	2	184	216	−32	4	Classification Round
4	Portugal (H)	3	0	3	222	246	−24	3	Classification Round

Source: FIBA
Rules for classification: 1) points; 2) head-to-head points difference.
(H) Hosts

15 July 1999
19:30

Boxscore

Argentina	87–82	Portugal
Scoring by half: 43–47, 44–35
Pts: Carrizo 22; Rebs: Carrizo, Leiva 6 Asts: Ciorciari 3		Pts: Silva 14; Rebs: Cunha 5 Asts: Lacerda, Rodrigues, Lourenço 2

Aveiro

15 July 1999
21:30

Boxscore

Qatar	54–61	Croatia
Scoring by half: 27–31, 27–30
Pts: Musa 33; Rebs: Zaidan 12; Asts: Daoud 2		Pts: Stojić 14; Rebs: Bagarić 11; Asts: Stojić 4

Aveiro

16 July 1999
19:30

Boxscore

Portugal	73–77	Qatar
Scoring by half: 41–40, 32–37
Pts: Cunha 16; Rebs: Cunha 9 Asts: Goncalves 3		Pts: Musa 34; Rebs: Musa 18; Asts: Musa 4

Aveiro

16 July 1999
21:30

Boxscore

Croatia	64–54	Argentina
Scoring by half: 28–29, 36–25
Pts: Stojić 19; Rebs: Žižić 11; Asts: Stojić 2		Pts: Chahab 10; Rebs: Kammerichs 6 Asts: Carrizo, Lauro 2

Aveiro

17 July 1999
19:30

Boxscore

Portugal	67–82	Croatia
Scoring by half: 39–40, 28–42
Pts: Rodrigues 12; Rebs: Rodrigues 5 Asts: Lacerda 3		Pts: Stojić 21; Rebs: Džidić 12; Asts: Stojić 4

Aveiro

17 July 1999
21:30

Boxscore

Qatar	53–82	Argentina
Scoring by half: 28–36, 25–46
Pts: Musa 13; Rebs: Rahman, Zaidan 6 Asts: Salem 2		Pts: Chahab 22; Rebs: Malara, Leiva 7 Asts: Alba, Lauro, Leiva 2

Aveiro

=== Group D ===
Pos	Team	Pld	W	L	PF	PA	PD	Pts	Qualification
1	Russia	3	3	0	284	209	+75	6	Quarterfinal round
2	Australia	3	2	1	226	193	+33	5	Quarterfinal round
3	Venezuela	3	1	2	213	218	−5	4	Classification Round
4	Japan	3	0	3	205	308	−103	3	Classification Round

Source: FIBA
Rules for classification: 1) points; 2) head-to-head points difference.

15 July 1999
15:30

Boxscore

Japan	82–118	Russia
Scoring by half: 39–62, 43–56
Pts: Murayama 31; Rebs: Kashiwakura 5 Asts: Kashiwakura, Murayama, K. Sato 2		Pts: Kirilenko 26; Rebs: Kirilenko 13; Asts: Kirilenko 6

Faro

15 July 1999
17:30

Boxscore

Australia	70–52	Venezuela
Scoring by half: 32–18, 38–34
Pts: Rice 14; Rebs: Andersen 12; Asts: Clowry, Black 2		Pts: M. Berroterán 18; Rebs: Julio 6 Asts: M. Berroterán, Herrera 1

Faro

16 July 1999
15:30

Boxscore

Venezuela	95–59	Japan
Scoring by half: 46–24, 49–35
Pts: Romero 15; Rebs: Julio 12; Asts: Julio 3		Pts: Murayama 20; Rebs: Uzawa 4 Asts: Tabuse 4

Faro

16 July 1999
17:30

Boxscore

Russia	77–61	Australia
Scoring by half: 34–32, 43–29
Pts: Kirilenko 19; Rebs: Kirilenko 12; Asts: Vokhmianine 2		Pts: Rice 14; Rebs: Andersen 8 Asts: Andersen 2

Faro

17 July 1999
15:30

Boxscore

Japan	64–95	Australia
Scoring by half: 28–38, 36–57
Pts: Kikuchi 15; Rebs: Kashiwakura 5 Asts: Kashiwakura 4		Pts: Andersen 22; Rebs: Andersen 16; Asts: Black 6

Faro

17 July 1999
17:30

Boxscore

Venezuela	66–89	Russia
Scoring by half: 30–46, 36–43
Pts: Cappare 16; Rebs: Julio 5 Asts: M. Berroterán 2		Pts: Toporov 25; Rebs: Kirilenko 13; Asts: Kirilenko 4

Faro

== Quarterfinal round ==
=== Group E ===
Pos	Team	Pld	W	L	PF	PA	PD	Pts	Qualification
1	Spain	3	2	1	218	208	+10	5	Semi-finals
2	Croatia	3	2	1	186	185	+1	5	Semi-finals
3	Australia	3	1	2	203	208	−5	4	5th–8th Classification
4	Greece	3	1	2	207	213	−6	4	5th–8th Classification

Source: FIBA
Rules for classification: 1) points; 2) head-to-head points difference.

19 July 1999
15:30

Boxscore

Spain	80–75	Australia
Scoring by half: 41–40, 39–35
Pts: Navarro 26; Rebs: Reyes 9 Asts: Cabezas, Navarro 3		Pts: Andersen 21; Rebs: Looke, Sheridan 5 Asts: Andersen 6

Porto

19 July 1999
17:30

Boxscore

Croatia	73–59	Greece
Scoring by half: 29–25, 44–34
Pts: Stojić 25; Rebs: Džidić 10; Asts: Stojić 4		Pts: Papadopoulos 17; Rebs: Papadopoulos 9 Asts: Papamakarios 4

Porto

20 July 1999
15:30

Boxscore

Australia	56–58	Croatia
Scoring by half: 24–21, 32–37
Pts: Rice 20; Rebs: Andersen 13; Asts: Andersen, Black 3		Pts: Žižić 19; Rebs: Žižić 9 Asts: Džidić, Stojić 2

Porto

20 July 1999
17:30

Boxscore

Greece	78–68	Spain
Scoring by half: 45–34, 33–34
Pts: Diamantopoulos 25; Rebs: Papadopoulos 7 Asts: Diamantopoulos, Agadakos 2		Pts: Navarro 15; Rebs: Reyes 6 Asts: López 3

Porto

21 July 1999
15:30

Boxscore

Spain	70–55	Croatia
Scoring by half: 41–36, 29–19
Pts: Navarro 19; Rebs: Gabriel 11; Asts: López 3		Pts: Žižić 13; Rebs: Stojić 10; Asts: Stojić 2

Porto

21 July 1999
17:30

Boxscore

Greece	70–72	Australia
Scoring by half: 43–39, 27–33
Pts: Fotsis 16; Rebs: Papadopoulos 8 Asts: Pappas 2		Pts: Rice 25; Rebs: Black 4 Asts: Black 4

Porto

=== Group F ===
Pos	Team	Pld	W	L	PF	PA	PD	Pts	Qualification
1	United States	3	3	0	256	212	+44	6	Semi-finals
2	Argentina	3	1	2	215	206	+9	4 (Note: Argentina ahead on head-to-head points difference: ARG +21; RUS +1; BRA –22)	Semi-finals
3	Russia	3	1	2	222	235	−13	4	5th–8th Classification
4	Brazil	3	1	2	222	262	−40	4	5th–8th Classification

Source: FIBA
Rules for classification: 1) points; 2) head-to-head points difference.
Notes:

19 July 1999
19:30

Boxscore

Brazil	91–89 (OT)	Russia
Scoring by half: 32–44, 45–33 Overtime: 14–12
Pts: Faggeane 24; Rebs: Moura 11; Asts: Pinheiro 3		Pts: Karimov 23; Rebs: Karimov 13; Asts: Padius 5

Almada

19 July 1999
21:30

Boxscore

Argentina	71–83	United States
Scoring by half: 35–51, 36–32
Pts: Calderon 17; Rebs: Calderon 6 Asts: Leiva 3		Pts: Logan 15; Rebs: Simmons 8 Asts: Simmons 3

Almada

20 July 1999
19:30

Boxscore

United States	89–71	Brazil
Scoring by half: 36–37, 53–34
Pts: L. Williams 22; Rebs: L. Williams 8 Asts: Logan 4		Pts: Pinheiro 25; Rebs: Moura 8 Asts: Campos, Amaral 2

Almada

20 July 1999
21:30

Boxscore

Russia	63–60 (OT)	Argentina
Scoring by half: 19–22, 32–29 Overtime: 12–9
Pts: Vokhmianine, Padius 12; Rebs: Karimov 10; Asts: Vokhmianine 3		Pts: Chahab 17; Rebs: Calderon 13; Asts: Lauro 3

Almada

21 July 1999
19:30

Boxscore

Brazil	60–84	Argentina
Scoring by half: 33–37, 27–47
Pts: Faggeane, Valentin 10; Rebs: Valentin 5 Asts: Giovannoni 3		Pts: Carrizo 17; Rebs: Leiva 8 Asts: Leiva 5

Almada

21 July 1999
21:30

Boxscore

United States	84–70	Russia
Scoring by half: 43–40, 41–30
Pts: Dooling 18; Rebs: Wright 7 Asts: Logan 4		Pts: Kirilenko 23; Rebs: Karimov 8 Asts: Kirilenko 1

Almada

=== Group G ===
Pos	Team	Pld	W	L	PF	PA	PD	Pts	Qualification
1	Latvia	3	3	0	272	222	+50	6	9th–12th Classification
2	Qatar	3	2	1	236	213	+23	5	9th–12th Classification
3	Japan	3	1	2	234	254	−20	4	13th–16th Classification
4	China	3	0	3	207	260	−53	3	13th–16th Classification

Source: FIBA
Rules for classification: 1) points; 2) head-to-head points difference.

19 July 1999
19:30

Boxscore

Latvia	94–86	Japan
Scoring by half: 51–52, 43–34
Pts: Jumikis 22; Rebs: Grafs 15; Asts: Grafs 4		Pts: Kikuchi 29; Rebs: Yamada 5 Asts: Tabuse, Kashiwakura, K. Sato 5

Aveiro

19 July 1999
21:30

Boxscore

Qatar	83–64	China
Scoring by half: 50–33, 33–31
Pts: Musa 27; Rebs: Zaidan 14; Asts: Al Nasr 4		Pts: Mo 14; Rebs: Mo 6 Asts: Liu, Mo, Li D. 1

Aveiro

20 July 1999
19:30

Boxscore

China	66–98	Latvia
Scoring by half: 29–50, 37–48
Pts: Yan 17; Rebs: Jia 14; Asts: Li D. 3		Pts: Vaikulis 21; Rebs: Jumikis 10; Asts: Valters, Vaikulis 4

Aveiro

20 July 1999
21:30

Boxscore

Japan	69–83	Qatar
Scoring by half: 36–40, 33–43
Pts: Kikuchi 25; Rebs: Sato, Yamada 6 Asts: Tabuse 4		Pts: Musa 32; Rebs: Musa 24; Asts: Zaidan 3

Aveiro

21 July 1999
19:30

Boxscore

China	77–79	Japan
Scoring by half: 39–48, 38–31
Pts: Liu 22; Rebs: Wang, Li D. 8 Asts: Li D. 3		Pts: Murayama 17; Rebs: Sato 6 Asts: Tabuse 7

Aveiro

21 July 1999
21:30

Boxscore

Latvia	80–70	Qatar
Scoring by half: 46–36, 34–34
Pts: Valters 24; Rebs: Grafs 13; Asts: Valters, Jumikis 3		Pts: Musa 29; Rebs: Musa 17; Asts: Daoud 4

Aveiro

=== Group H ===
Pos	Team	Pld	W	L	PF	PA	PD	Pts	Qualification
1	Venezuela	3	3	0	250	230	+20	6	9th–12th Classification
2	Nigeria	3	2	1	210	186	+24	5	9th–12th Classification
3	Egypt	3	1	2	200	224	−24	4	13th–16th Classification
4	Portugal (H)	3	0	3	185	205	−20	3	13th–16th Classification

Source: FIBA
Rules for classification: 1) points; 2) head-to-head points difference.
(H) Hosts

19 July 1999
15:30

Boxscore

Nigeria	71–75 (OT)	Venezuela
Scoring by half: 38–32, 26–32 Overtime: 7–11
Pts: Jibril 12; Rebs: Oyedeji 19; Asts: Odaudu 5		Pts: Romero 27; Rebs: Nava 7 Asts: M. Berroterán 7

Faro
Attendance: 1100

19 July 1999
17:30

Boxscore

Portugal	57–58	Egypt
Scoring by half: 30–27, 27–31
Pts: Silva 11; Rebs: Sekunda 10; Asts: Silva 3		Pts: Abdel-Bary 15; Rebs: Fanan 7 Asts: Hussein 3

Faro
Attendance: 1200

20 July 1999
15:30

Boxscore

Egypt	50–67	Nigeria
Scoring by half: 22–27, 28–40
Pts: Abdel-Bary 15; Rebs: Badran 12; Asts: Fanan 5		Pts: Eze 12; Rebs: Oyedeji 19; Asts: Odaudu 5

Faro

20 July 1999
17:30

Boxscore

Venezuela	75–67	Portugal
Scoring by half: 39–31, 36–36
Pts: Romero 17; Rebs: Nava 12; Asts: M. Berroterán 7		Pts: Pereira 17; Rebs: Rodrigues 9 Asts: Alves 3

Faro
Attendance: 1300

21 July 1999
15:30

Boxscore

Egypt	92–100 (OT)	Venezuela
Scoring by half: 39–36, 45–48 Overtime: 8–16
Pts: Fanan 24; Rebs: Badran 10; Asts: Hussein 5		Pts: Cappare 33; Rebs: Nava 11; Asts: M. Berroterán 11

Faro

21 July 1999
17:30

Boxscore

Nigeria	72–61	Portugal
Scoring by half: 42–40, 30–21
Pts: Jibril 16; Rebs: Oyedeji 16; Asts: Okafor 1		Pts: Silva 25; Rebs: Sekunda 12; Asts: Goncalves 2

Faro
Attendance: 1300

== Classification 13th–16th ==
13th–16th classification
23 July – Lisbon
Japan	87
Portugal	85
23 July – Lisbon
China	71
Egypt	79

Thirteenth place
24 July – Lisbon
Japan	83
Egypt	90
Fifteenth place
25 July – Lisbon
Portugal	75
China	76

=== Semifinals ===
23 July 1999

Boxscore

Japan	87–85	Portugal
Scoring by half: 38–36, 49–49
Pts: Kikuchi 27; Rebs: Uzawa 9 Asts: Kashiwakura 2		Pts: Silva 19; Rebs: Cunha 14; Asts: Goncalves 4

23 July 1999

Boxscore

China	71–79	Egypt
Scoring by half: 37–37, 34–42
Pts: Jia 20; Rebs: Jia 8 Asts: Liu 2		Pts: Abdel-Bary 29; Rebs: El-Sehrty 10; Asts: Hussein 3

=== 15th place ===
24 July 1999

Boxscore

China	76–75	Portugal
Scoring by half: 38–48, 38–27
Pts: Liu 18; Rebs: Mo 11; Asts: Jia 4		Pts: Silva 22; Rebs: Cunha 9 Asts: Lacerda 3

=== 13th place ===
24 July 1999

Boxscore

Egypt	90–83	Japan
Scoring by half: 43–33, 47–50
Pts: Abdel-Bary 25; Rebs: Badran 18; Asts: Fanan 5		Pts: Murayama 22; Rebs: Uzawa 9 Asts: Kashiwakura 4

== Classification 9th–12th ==
9th–12th classification
23 July – Lisbon
Latvia	71
Nigeria	56
23 July – Lisbon
Qatar	70
Venezuela	69

Ninth place
25 July – Lisbon
Latvia	68
Qatar	61
Eleventh place
25 July – Lisbon
Nigeria	92
Venezuela	71

=== Semifinals ===
23 July 1999

Boxscore

Latvia	71–56	Nigeria
Scoring by half: 27–30, 44–26
Pts: Grafs 17; Rebs: Grafs 19; Asts: Ļaksa 4		Pts: Jibril 22; Rebs: Oyedeji 12; Asts: Jibril 3

23 July 1999

Boxscore

Qatar	70–69	Venezuela
Scoring by half: 31–33, 39–36
Pts: Daoud 21; Rebs: Musa 11; Asts: Mubarak 1		Pts: Romero 18; Rebs: Julio 9 Asts: M. Berroterán 7

=== 11th place ===
25 July 1999

Boxscore

Nigeria	92–71	Venezuela
Scoring by half: 43–31, 49–40
Pts: Jibril 26; Rebs: Eze 5 Asts: Varem 5		Pts: Romero 21; Rebs: Julio 5 Asts: M. Berroterán 3

=== 9th place ===
25 July 1999

Boxscore

Latvia	68–61	Qatar
Scoring by half: 29–31, 44–26
Pts: Valters 18; Rebs: Grafs 9 Asts: Valters 4		Pts: Musa 12; Rebs: Zaidan 9 Asts: Musa 2

== Classification 5th–8th ==
5th–8th classification
24 July – Lisbon
Australia	81
Brazil	74
24 July – Lisbon
Greece	71
Russia	74

Fifth place
25 July – Lisbon
Australia	63
Russia	51
Seventh place
25 July – Lisbon
Brazil	61
Greece	84

=== Semifinals ===
24 July 1999

Boxscore

Australia	81–74	Brazil
Scoring by half: 40–40, 44–26
Pts: Rice 18; Rebs: Andersen 16; Asts: Black 8		Pts: Souza 22; Rebs: Moura 11; Asts: Moura 6

24 July 1999

Boxscore

Greece	71–74	Russia
Scoring by half: 41–30, 30–44
Pts: Papamakarios 16; Rebs: Pappas 6 Asts: Papadopoulos 2		Pts: Toporov 21; Rebs: Kirilenko 9 Asts: Kirilenko 6

=== 7th place ===
25 July 1999

Boxscore

Brazil	61–84	Greece
Scoring by half: 29–42, 32–42
Pts: Pinheiro 15; Rebs: Rodrigues 7 Asts: Faggeane, Giovannoni 2		Pts: Fotsis 29; Rebs: Fotsis 8 Asts: Papadopoulos 4

=== 5th place ===
25 July 1999

Boxscore

Australia	63–51	Russia
Scoring by half: 30–24, 33–27
Pts: Rice 15; Rebs: Andersen 13; Asts: Black 3		Pts: Kirilenko 28; Rebs: Kirilenko 7 Asts: three players 2

== Final round ==
Semi-finals
24 July – Lisbon
Spain	81
Argentina	80
24 July – Lisbon
Croatia	62
United States	83

Final
25 July – Lisbon
Spain	94
United States	87
Third place
25 July – Lisbon
Argentina	59
Croatia	66

=== Semifinals ===
24 July 1999

Boxscore

Croatia	62–83	United States
Scoring by half: 26–51, 36–32
Pts: Džidić 12; Rebs: Pehar 6 Asts: Bagarić 3		Pts: C. Williams, Wright 15; Rebs: Collison 8 Asts: Logan, C. Williams 2

Lisbon

24 July 1999

Boxscore

Spain	81–80	Argentina
Scoring by half: 41–31, 40–49
Pts: Navarro 22; Rebs: Gabriel 5 Asts: Gasol 6		Pts: Calderon, Chahab 13; Rebs: Calderon, Mikulas 4 Asts: Ciorciari, Carrizo 2

Lisbon

=== 3rd place ===
25 July 1999

Boxscore

Croatia	66–59	Argentina
Scoring by half: 32–30, 34–29
Pts: Stojić 24; Rebs: Žižić 14; Asts: Stojić 4		Pts: Chahab 13; Rebs: Malara 5 Asts: Alba 2

Lisbon

=== Final ===
25 July 1999

Boxscore

United States	87–94	Spain
Scoring by half: 47–47, 40–47
Pts: Simmons 19; Rebs: Simmons 6 Asts: Dooling 5		Pts: Navarro 25; Rebs: Drame 8 Asts: Navarro 6

Lisbon

== Final standings ==
Rank	Team	Record
1st place, gold medalist(s)	Spain	7–1
2nd place, silver medalist(s)	United States	7–1
3rd place, bronze medalist(s)	Croatia	6–2
4th	Argentina	3–5
5th	Australia	5–3
6th	Russia	5–3
7th	Greece	4–4
8th	Brazil	3–5
9th	Latvia	6–2
10th	Qatar	4–4
11th	Nigeria	3–5
12th	Venezuela	4–4
13th	Egypt	4–4
14th	Japan	2–6
15th	China	1–7
16th	Portugal	0–8

Source: FIBA Archive

== Awards ==
1999 FIBA Under-19 World Championship

Spain
First title

Most Valuable Player
(Russia) Andrei Kirilenko
