= Ilić =

Ilić is a surname derived from the South Slavic masculine given name Ilija (itself derived from biblical Elijah) and found across the former SFRJ. It is seventh most frequent surname in Serbia.

== Notable people ==
- Aleksandar Ilić (politician) (born 1945), politician, diplomat and professor of literature at Belgrade University
- Aleksandar "Sanja" Ilić (1951–2021), Serbian and Yugoslav musician and composer
- Aleksandar Ilić (footballer, born 1969), Serbian football manager and former footballer
- Aleksandar Ilić (footballer, born 1994), Bosnian Serb footballer
- Bogdan Ilić (born 1996), Serbian YouTuber, rapper, gamer and entertainer
- Brana Ilić (born 1985), Serbian footballer
- Branko Ilić (born 1983), Slovenian footballer
- Dan Ilic (born 1981), Australian TV presenter, comedian, film maker
- Danilo Ilić (1891–1915), Bosnian journalist and co-conspirator in the assassination of the Archduke Franz Ferdinand of Austria
- Dejan Ilić (born 1976), Serbian footballer
- Grgo Ilić (1736 – 1813), Bosnian Franciscan and a bishop
- Ivan Ilić (footballer, born 1971), Serbian footballer
- Ivan Ilić (footballer, born 2001), Serbian footballer
- Ivan Ilić (pianist) (born 1978), Serbian-American pianist living in Paris
- Ivan Ilić (volleyball) (born 1976), Serbian volleyball player
- Jovan Ilić (1824–1901), Serbian poet, father of Vojislav Ilić
- Marija Ilić (footballer) (born 1993), Serbian football defender
- Marija D. Ilić (born 1951), Serbian-American electrical engineer
- Marija Ilić Agapova (1895–1984), Serbian jurist and librarian
- Marija Ilić (Serbian basketball player) (born 1998), Serbian basketball player
- Marija Ilić (German basketball player) (born 2007), German basketball player
- Marija Ilić (footballer, born 2003), Serbian football midfielder
- Marko Ilić (footballer, born 1985), Serbian football midfielder
- Marko Ilić (footballer, born 1998), Serbian football goalkeeper for Kortrijk
- Mile Ilić (born 1984), Serbian basketball player
- Milica Ilić (born 1981), Australian classical guitarist
- Milovan Ilić Minimaks (1938–2005), Serbian radio and TV journalist
- Mirko Ilić (born 1956), Yugoslavian graphic designer based in New York
- Miroslav Ilić (born 1950), Serbian singer-songwriter
- Petar Ilić (born 1993), Serbian footballer
- Radiša Ilić (born 1977), Serbian football goalkeeper
- Saša Ilić (footballer, born 1970), Macedonian football goalkeeper
- Saša Ilić (footballer, born 1972), Serbian-Australian football goalkeeper
- Saša Ilić (writer, born 1972), Serbian writer
- Saša Ilić (footballer, born 1977), Serbian football midfielder
- Stefan Ilić (born 1995), Serbian footballer
- Tatjana Ilić (born 1966), Serbian artist
- Teodor Ilić Češljar (1746–1793), Serbian painter
- Vanja Ilić (swimmer) (1927–2018), Yugoslavian Olympic swimmer
- Velimir Ilić (born 1951), Serbian politician
- Vladimir Ilić (born 1982), Montenegrin footballer
- Vojislav Ilić (1862–1894), Serbian poet, son of Jovan Ilić

== See also ==
- Illich
