= FIBA EuroBasket 2007 squads =

The following is the list of squads for each of the 16 teams competing in the FIBA EuroBasket 2007, held in Spain between 3 and 16 September 2007. Each team selected a squad of 12 players for the tournament.

== Group A ==
=== Greece ===
Greece men's national basketball team roster
Players
Coaches

Pos.	No.	Name	Age – Date of birth	Height	Club
G	4	Theo Papaloukas	30 – 8 May 1977	2.00 m (6 ft 7 in)	CSKA Moscow	(Russia)
C	5	Ioannis Bourousis	23 – 17 November 1983	2.15 m (7 ft 1 in)	Olympiacos	(Greece)
G	6	Nikos Zisis	24 – 16 August 1983	1.97 m (6 ft 6 in)	CSKA Moscow	(Russia)
G	7	Vassilis Spanoulis	25 – 7 August 1982	1.93 m (6 ft 4 in)	Panathinaikos	(Greece)
F	8	Panagiotis Vasilopoulos	23 – 8 February 1984	2.05 m (6 ft 9 in)	Olympiacos	(Greece)
F	9	Michalis Pelekanos	26 – 25 May 1981	1.99 m (6 ft 6 in)	Real Madrid	(Spain)
G	10	Nikos Chatzivrettas	30 – 26 May 1977	1.97 m (6 ft 6 in)	Panathinaikos	(Greece)
PF	11	Dimos Dikoudis	30 – 24 June 1977	2.08 m (6 ft 10 in)	Panathinaikos	(Greece)
C	12	Kostas Tsartsaris	27 – 17 October 1979	2.10 m (6 ft 11 in)	Panathinaikos	(Greece)
G	13	Dimitris Diamantidis	27 – 6 May 1980	1.96 m (6 ft 5 in)	Panathinaikos	(Greece)
C	14	Lazaros Papadopoulos	27 – 3 June 1980	2.13 m (7 ft 0 in)	Real Madrid	(Spain)
F	15	Michalis Kakiouzis	30 – 29 November 1976	2.07 m (6 ft 9 in)	Caja San Fernando	(Spain)

Head coach

- Panagiotis Giannakis

Legend

- Club – describes last
  club before the tournament
- Age – describes age
  on 3 September 2007

=== Israel ===
Israel men's national basketball team roster
Players
Coaches

Pos.	No.	Name	Age – Date of birth	Height	Club
G	4	Dror Hajaj	28 – 31 December 1978	1.78 m (5 ft 10 in)	Hapoel Jerusalem	(Israel)
G	5	Moran Roth	24 – 10 November 1982	1.80 m (5 ft 11 in)	Hapoel Holon	(Israel)
G	6	Yotam Halperin	23 – 24 January 1984	1.93 m (6 ft 4 in)	Maccabi Tel Aviv	(Israel)
F	7	Lior Eliyahu	21 – 9 September 1985	2.03 m (6 ft 8 in)	Maccabi Tel Aviv	(Israel)
C	8	Erez Markovich	29 – 10 July 1978	2.08 m (6 ft 10 in)	Hapoel Jerusalem	(Israel)
G	9	Jeron Roberts	30 – 10 November 1976	1.94 m (6 ft 4 in)	Demon Astronauts Amsterdam	(Netherlands)
F	10	Guy Pnini	23 – 4 September 1983	2.01 m (6 ft 7 in)	Hapoel Jerusalem	(Israel)
G	11	Meir Tapiro	32 – 28 March 1975	1.92 m (6 ft 4 in)	Bnei HaSharon	(Israel)
G	12	Matan Naor	26 – 3 November 1980	1.94 m (6 ft 4 in)	Ironi Nahariya	(Israel)
SF	13	Ido Kozikaro	29 – 8 January 1978	2.02 m (6 ft 8 in)	Ironi Nahariya	(Israel)
C	14	Yaniv Green	27 – 16 May 1980	2.06 m (6 ft 9 in)	CSK VVS Samara	(Russia)
C	15	Amit Tamir	27 – 2 December 1979	2.08 m (6 ft 10 in)	Cherkaski Monkeys	(Ukraine)

Head coach

- Zvi Sherf

Legend

- Club – describes last
  club before the tournament
- Age – describes age
  on 3 September 2007

=== Russia ===
Russia men's national basketball team roster
Players
Coaches

Pos.	No.	Name	Age – Date of birth	Height	Club
F	4	Nikita Shabalkin	20 – 9 October 1986	2.06 m (6 ft 9 in)	Khimki	(Russia)
PG	5	Jon Robert Holden	31 – 16 August 1976	1.84 m (6 ft 0 in)	CSKA Moscow	(Russia)
G	6	Sergei Bykov	24 – 26 February 1983	1.90 m (6 ft 3 in)	Dynamo Moscow	(Russia)
F	7	Andrei Kirilenko	26 – 18 February 1981	2.09 m (6 ft 10 in)	Utah Jazz	(United States)
F	8	Nikita Morgunov	32 – 29 June 1975	2.11 m (6 ft 11 in)	Triumph Lyubertsy	(Russia)
PG	9	Petr Samoylenko	30 – 7 February 1977	1.85 m (6 ft 1 in)	Dynamo Moscow	(Russia)
F	10	Victor Khryapa	25 – 3 August 1982	2.03 m (6 ft 8 in)	Chicago Bulls	(United States)
SG	11	Zakhar Pashutin	33 – 3 May 1974	1.96 m (6 ft 5 in)	CSKA Moscow	(Russia)
F	12	Sergei Monia	24 – 15 April 1983	2.03 m (6 ft 8 in)	Dynamo Moscow	(Russia)
G	13	Anton Ponkrashov	21 – 23 April 1986	2.02 m (6 ft 8 in)	Khimki	(Russia)
C	14	Aleksey Savrasenko	28 – 28 February 1979	2.15 m (7 ft 1 in)	CSKA Moscow	(Russia)
SG	15	Nikolay Padius	27 – 9 January 1980	1.97 m (6 ft 6 in)	UNICS Kazan	(Russia)

Head coach

- (Israel) David Blatt

Legend

- Club – describes last
  club before the tournament
- Age – describes age
  on 3 September 2007

=== Serbia ===
Serbia men's national basketball team roster
Players
Coaches

Pos.	No.	Name	Age – Date of birth	Height	Club
G	4	Miloš Teodosić	20 – 19 March 1987	1.95 m (6 ft 5 in)	FMP Železnik	(Serbia)
F	5	Branko Cvetković	23 – 5 March 1984	2.00 m (6 ft 7 in)	Akasvayu Girona	(Spain)
G	6	Vuk Radivojević	24 – 30 July 1983	1.95 m (6 ft 5 in)	Alta Gestión Fuenlabrada	(Spain)
C	7	Zoran Erceg	22 – 11 January 1985	2.11 m (6 ft 11 in)	FMP Železnik	(Serbia)
F	8	Dragan Labović	20 – 20 April 1987	2.05 m (6 ft 9 in)	FMP Železnik	(Serbia)
PG	9	Stefan Marković	19 – 25 April 1988	1.91 m (6 ft 3 in)	Hemofarm	(Serbia)
G	10	Marko Jarić	28 – 12 October 1978	1.98 m (6 ft 6 in)	Minnesota Timberwolves	(United States)
C	11	Darko Miličić	22 – 20 June 1985	2.12 m (6 ft 11 in)	Memphis Grizzlies	(United States)
F	12	Nemanja Aleksandrov	20 – 20 April 1987	2.09 m (6 ft 10 in)	Red Star Belgrade	(Serbia)
PF	13	Novica Veličković	20 – 5 October 1986	2.05 m (6 ft 9 in)	Partizan	(Serbia)
F	14	Milenko Tepić	20 – 27 February 1987	2.00 m (6 ft 7 in)	Partizan	(Serbia)
F	15	Milan Gurović	32 – 17 June 1975	2.04 m (6 ft 8 in)	Prokom Trefl Sopot	(Poland)

Head coach

- Zoran Slavnić

Assistant coach(es)

- Velimir Gašić

Legend

- Club – describes last
  club before the tournament
- Age – describes age
  on 3 September 2007

== Group B ==
=== Croatia ===
Croatia men's national basketball team roster
Players
Coaches

Pos.	No.	Name	Age – Date of birth	Height	Club
G	4	Roko Ukić	22 – 5 December 1984	1.83 m (6 ft 0 in)	Lottomatica Roma	(Italy)
SG	5	Davor Kus	29 – 21 July 1978	1.92 m (6 ft 4 in)	Unicaja Málaga	(Spain)
G	6	Marko Popović	25 – 12 June 1982	1.85 m (6 ft 1 in)	Žalgiris Kaunas	(Lithuania)
F	7	Marin Rozić	24 – 14 February 1983	2.03 m (6 ft 8 in)	Cibona Zagreb	(Croatia)
C	8	Nikola Prkačin	31 – 15 November 1975	2.08 m (6 ft 10 in)	Dynamo Moscow	(Russia)
G	9	Marko Tomas	22 – 3 January 1985	2.02 m (6 ft 8 in)	Alta Gestión Fuenlabrada	(Spain)
G	10	Zoran Planinić	24 – 12 September 1982	1.97 m (6 ft 6 in)	TAU Cerámica	(Spain)
F/C	11	Mario Stojić	27 – 6 May 1980	1.98 m (6 ft 6 in)	ViveMenorca	(Spain)
F	12	Damir Markota	21 – 26 December 1985	2.09 m (6 ft 10 in)	Spartak Saint Petersburg	(Russia)
SF	13	Marko Banić	23 – 31 August 1984	2.04 m (6 ft 8 in)	Iurbentia Bilbao	(Spain)
C	14	Mario Kasun	27 – 5 April 1980	2.16 m (7 ft 1 in)	FC Barcelona	(Spain)
C	15	Stanko Barać	21 – 13 August 1986	2.17 m (7 ft 1 in)	TAU Cerámica	(Spain)

Head coach

- Jasmin Repeša

Legend

- Club – describes last
  club before the tournament
- Age – describes age
  on 3 September 2007

=== Latvia ===
Latvia men's national basketball team roster
Players
Coaches

Pos.	No.	Name	Age – Date of birth	Height	Club
F	4	Uvis Helmanis	35 – 10 June 1972	2.04 m (6 ft 8 in)	Ventspils	(Latvia)
G	5	Aigars Vītols	31 – 15 February 1976	1.94 m (6 ft 4 in)	Ventspils	(Latvia)
G	6	Armands Šķēle	23 – 4 September 1983	1.92 m (6 ft 4 in)	Barons Riga	(Latvia)
G	7	Jānis Blūms	25 – 20 April 1982	1.90 m (6 ft 3 in)	Lietuvos rytas	(Lithuania)
G	8	Raimonds Vaikulis	27 – 4 February 1980	1.91 m (6 ft 3 in)	Ventspils	(Latvia)
F	9	Gatis Jahovičs	23 – 11 August 1984	2.00 m (6 ft 7 in)	Anwil Włocławek	(Poland)
G	10	Sandis Valters	29 – 31 August 1978	1.90 m (6 ft 3 in)	ASK Riga	(Latvia)
F	11	Pāvels Veselovs	24 – 15 July 1983	2.07 m (6 ft 9 in)	Ventspils	(Latvia)
F	12	Kaspars Cipruss	25 – 2 February 1982	2.07 m (6 ft 9 in)	Ventspils	(Latvia)
C	13	Raitis Grafs	26 – 12 July 1981	2.08 m (6 ft 10 in)	ASK Riga	(Latvia)
G	14	Kristaps Janičenoks	24 – 14 March 1983	1.95 m (6 ft 5 in)	Climamio Bologna	(Italy)
C	15	Andris Biedriņš	21 – 2 April 1986	2.11 m (6 ft 11 in)	Golden State Warriors	(United States)

Head coach

- Kārlis Muižnieks

Legend

- Club – describes last
  club before the tournament
- Age – describes age
  on 3 September 2007

=== Portugal ===
Portugal men's national basketball team roster
Players
Coaches

Pos.	No.	Name	Age – Date of birth	Height	Club
G	4	Miguel Minhava	23 – 5 November 1983	1.99 m (6 ft 6 in)	L'Hospitalet	(Spain)
G	5	Mário Gil Fernandes	25 – 25 April 1982	1.74 m (5 ft 9 in)	Plasencia	(Spain)
F	6	Sérgio Ramos	31 – 11 December 1975	2.00 m (6 ft 7 in)	Drac Inca	(Spain)
F	7	Paulo Cunha	27 – 1 August 1980	1.99 m (6 ft 6 in)	FC Porto	(Portugal)
C	8	Francisco Jordão	27 – 30 December 1979	2.00 m (6 ft 7 in)	Primeiro de Agosto	(Angola)
G	9	Filipe da Silva	27 – 30 November 1979	1.93 m (6 ft 4 in)	Los Barrios	(Spain)
F	10	João Gomes	22 – 2 May 1985	1.99 m (6 ft 6 in)	Barreirense	(Portugal)
C	11	Jorge Coelho	28 – 18 October 1978	2.00 m (6 ft 7 in)	Palencia	(Spain)
F	12	Paulo Simão	31 – 27 April 1976	1.98 m (6 ft 6 in)	Belenenses	(Portugal)
C	13	Elvis Évora	29 – 4 February 1978	2.05 m (6 ft 9 in)	Ovarense Aerosoles	(Portugal)
C	14	Miguel Miranda	28 – 9 October 1978	2.05 m (6 ft 9 in)	Ovarense Aerosoles	(Portugal)
F	15	João Santos	28 – 15 June 1979	2.05 m (6 ft 9 in)	Grupo Capitol Valladolid	(Spain)

Head coach

- (Ukraine) Valentin Melnychuk

Legend

- Club – describes last
  club before the tournament
- Age – describes age
  on 3 September 2007

=== Spain ===
Spain men's national basketball team roster
Players
Coaches

Pos.	No.	Name	Age – Date of birth	Height	Club
F	4	Pau Gasol	27 – 6 July 1980	2.15 m (7 ft 1 in)	Memphis Grizzlies	(United States)
G	5	Rudy Fernández	22 – 4 April 1985	1.95 m (6 ft 5 in)	Joventut Badalona	(Spain)
G	6	Carlos Cabezas	26 – 14 November 1980	1.87 m (6 ft 2 in)	Unicaja Málaga	(Spain)
G	7	Juan Carlos Navarro	27 – 13 June 1980	1.93 m (6 ft 4 in)	Memphis Grizzlies	(United States)
G	8	José Calderón	25 – 28 September 1981	1.91 m (6 ft 3 in)	Toronto Raptors	(Canada)
F	9	Felipe Reyes	27 – 16 March 1980	2.03 m (6 ft 8 in)	Real Madrid	(Spain)
F	10	Carlos Jiménez	31 – 10 February 1976	2.05 m (6 ft 9 in)	Unicaja Málaga	(Spain)
PG	11	Sergio Rodríguez	21 – 12 June 1986	1.90 m (6 ft 3 in)	Portland Trail Blazers	(United States)
G	12	Berni Rodríguez	27 – 7 June 1980	1.97 m (6 ft 6 in)	Unicaja Málaga	(Spain)
C	13	Marc Gasol	22 – 29 January 1985	2.15 m (7 ft 1 in)	Akasvayu Girona	(Spain)
SF	14	Álex Mumbrú	28 – 12 June 1979	2.02 m (6 ft 8 in)	Real Madrid	(Spain)
SF	15	Jorge Garbajosa	29 – 19 December 1977	2.07 m (6 ft 9 in)	Toronto Raptors	(Canada)

Head coach

- Pepu Hernández

Legend

- Club – describes last
  club before the tournament
- Age – describes age
  on 3 September 2007

== Group C ==
=== Czech Republic ===
Czech Republic men's national basketball team roster
Players
Coaches

Pos.	No.	Name	Age – Date of birth	Height	Club
G	4	Stepán Vrubl	31 – 6 August 1976	1.86 m (6 ft 1 in)	A plus ŽS Brno	(Czech Republic)
G	5	Pavel Benes	32 – 17 March 1975	1.90 m (6 ft 3 in)	ČEZ Nymburk	(Czech Republic)
G	6	Maurice Whitfield	34 – 29 March 1973	1.86 m (6 ft 1 in)	Olympias Patras	(Greece)
F	7	Michal Kremen	26 – 29 July 1981	2.00 m (6 ft 7 in)	ČEZ Nymburk	(Czech Republic)
F	8	Lukás Kraus	23 – 6 May 1984	2.01 m (6 ft 7 in)	Kondoři Liberec	(Czech Republic)
G	9	Jiří Welsch	27 – 27 January 1980	1.97 m (6 ft 6 in)	Unicaja Málaga	(Spain)
F	10	Ladislav Sokolovsky	30 – 28 July 1977	2.00 m (6 ft 7 in)	ČEZ Nymburk	(Czech Republic)
F	11	Luboš Bartoň	27 – 7 April 1980	2.02 m (6 ft 8 in)	Joventut Badalona	(Spain)
F	12	Radek Necas	27 – 18 July 1980	2.04 m (6 ft 8 in)	ČEZ Nymburk	(Czech Republic)
C	13	Petr Benda	25 – 25 March 1982	2.04 m (6 ft 8 in)	ČEZ Nymburk	(Czech Republic)
C	14	Jakub Houška	25 – 30 July 1982	2.06 m (6 ft 9 in)	CAI Zaragoza	(Spain)
C	15	Ondřej Starosta	28 – 28 May 1979	2.15 m (7 ft 1 in)	Děčín	(Czech Republic)

Head coach

- Zdenek Hummel

Legend

- Club – describes last
  club before the tournament
- Age – describes age
  on 3 September 2007

=== Germany ===
Germany men's national basketball team roster
Players
Coaches

Pos.	No.	Name	Age – Date of birth	Height	Club
G	4	Mithat Demirel	29 – 10 May 1978	1.81 m (5 ft 11 in)
F	5	Ademola Okulaja	32 – 10 July 1975	2.03 m (6 ft 8 in)	Brose Baskets Bamberg	(Germany)
C	6	Stephen Arigbabu	35 – 15 February 1972	2.06 m (6 ft 9 in)	G.S. Olympia Larissa	(Greece)
SG	7	Robert Garrett	30 – 18 March 1977	1.92 m (6 ft 4 in)	Brose Baskets Bamberg	(Germany)
SG	8	Johannes Herber	24 – 17 January 1983	1.97 m (6 ft 6 in)	Alba Berlin	(Germany)
G	9	Steffen Hamann	26 – 14 June 1981	1.96 m (6 ft 5 in)	Brose Baskets Bamberg	(Germany)
G	10	Demond Greene	28 – 15 June 1979	1.86 m (6 ft 1 in)	Brose Baskets Bamberg	(Germany)
PG	11	Pascal Roller	30 – 20 November 1976	1.80 m (5 ft 11 in)	Deutsche Bank Skyliners	(Germany)
F	12	Guido Grünheid	24 – 25 October 1982	2.06 m (6 ft 9 in)	Hanzevast Capitals	(Netherlands)
C	13	Patrick Femerling	32 – 4 March 1975	2.15 m (7 ft 1 in)	Alba Berlin	(Germany)
F	14	Dirk Nowitzki	29 – 19 June 1978	2.13 m (7 ft 0 in)	Dallas Mavericks	(United States)
C	15	Jan Jagla	26 – 25 June 1981	2.13 m (7 ft 0 in)	Joventut Badalona	(Spain)

Head coach

- Dirk Bauermann

Legend

- Club – describes last
  club before the tournament
- Age – describes age
  on 3 September 2007

=== Lithuania ===
Lithuania men's national basketball team roster
Players
Coaches

Pos.	No.	Name	Age – Date of birth	Height	Club
G	4	Rimantas Kaukėnas	30 – 11 April 1977	1.92 m (6 ft 4 in)	Montepaschi Siena	(Italy)
PG	5	Giedrius Gustas	27 – 4 March 1980	1.90 m (6 ft 3 in)	Barons Riga	(Latvia)
F	6	Jonas Mačiulis	22 – 10 February 1985	1.98 m (6 ft 6 in)	Žalgiris Kaunas	(Lithuania)
C	7	Darjuš Lavrinovič	27 – 1 November 1979	2.12 m (6 ft 11 in)	UNICS Kazan	(Russia)
G	8	Ramūnas Šiškauskas	28 – 10 September 1978	1.98 m (6 ft 6 in)	CSKA Moscow	(Russia)
F	9	Darius Songaila	29 – 14 February 1978	2.04 m (6 ft 8 in)	Washington Wizards	(United States)
F	10	Simas Jasaitis	25 – 26 March 1982	2.01 m (6 ft 7 in)	TAU Cerámica	(Spain)
F	11	Linas Kleiza	22 – 3 January 1985	2.03 m (6 ft 8 in)	Denver Nuggets	(United States)
C	12	Kšyštof Lavrinovič	27 – 11 November 1979	2.10 m (6 ft 11 in)	Montepaschi Siena	(Italy)
G	13	Šarūnas Jasikevičius	31 – 5 March 1976	1.92 m (6 ft 4 in)	Golden State Warriors	(United States)
F	14	Paulius Jankūnas	23 – 29 April 1984	2.05 m (6 ft 9 in)	Žalgiris Kaunas	(Lithuania)
C	15	Robertas Javtokas	27 – 20 March 1980	2.10 m (6 ft 11 in)	Dynamo Moscow	(Russia)

Head coach

- Ramūnas Butautas

Legend

- Club – describes last
  club before the tournament
- Age – describes age
  on 3 September 2007

=== Turkey ===
Turkey men's national basketball team roster
Players
Coaches

Pos.	No.	Name	Age – Date of birth	Height	Club
G	4	Ender Arslan	24 – 13 January 1983	1.85 m (6 ft 1 in)	Efes Pilsen	(Turkey)
C	5	Ermal Kuqo	27 – 12 February 1980	2.06 m (6 ft 9 in)	Efes Pilsen	(Turkey)
PG	6	Engin Atsür	23 – 2 April 1984	1.92 m (6 ft 4 in)	Benetton Treviso	(Italy)
G	7	Cenk Akyol	20 – 16 April 1987	1.98 m (6 ft 6 in)	Efes Pilsen	(Turkey)
F	8	Ersan İlyasova	20 – 15 May 1987	2.05 m (6 ft 9 in)	FC Barcelona	(Spain)
C	9	Semih Erden	21 – 28 July 1986	2.11 m (6 ft 11 in)	Fenerbahçe Ülker	(Turkey)
PG	10	Hakan Demirel	21 – 7 May 1986	1.90 m (6 ft 3 in)	Fenerbahçe Ülker	(Turkey)
SG	11	İbrahim Kutluay	33 – 7 January 1974	1.98 m (6 ft 6 in)	Fenerbahçe Ülker	(Turkey)
F	12	Kerem Gönlüm	29 – 22 November 1977	2.09 m (6 ft 10 in)	Efes Pilsen	(Turkey)
F	13	Mehmet Okur	28 – 26 May 1979	2.10 m (6 ft 11 in)	Utah Jazz	(United States)
F/C	14	Kaya Peker	27 – 2 August 1980	2.07 m (6 ft 9 in)	TAU Cerámica	(Spain)
F	15	Hedo Türkoğlu	28 – 19 March 1979	2.03 m (6 ft 8 in)	Orlando Magic	(United States)

Head coach

- (Serbia) Bogdan Tanjević

Legend

- Club – describes last
  club before the tournament
- Age – describes age
  on 3 September 2007

== Group D ==
=== France ===
France men's national basketball team roster
Players
Coaches

Pos.	No.	Name	Age – Date of birth	Height	Club
G	4	Joseph Gomis	29 – 2 July 1978	1.80 m (5 ft 11 in)	Grupo Capitol Valladolid	(Spain)
C	5	Pape Badiane	27 – 10 February 1980	2.08 m (6 ft 10 in)	Roanne	(France)
F	6	Sacha Giffa	30 – 14 June 1977	1.97 m (6 ft 6 in)	Strasbourg IG	(France)
G	7	Yohann Sangaré	24 – 5 April 1983	1.92 m (6 ft 4 in)	ASVEL Basket	(France)
F	8	Yakhouba Diawara	25 – 29 August 1982	2.01 m (6 ft 7 in)	Denver Nuggets	(United States)
G	9	Tony Parker	25 – 17 May 1982	1.86 m (6 ft 1 in)	San Antonio Spurs	(United States)
G	10	Cédric Ferchaud	27 – 15 July 1980	1.94 m (6 ft 4 in)	Pau-Orthez	(France)
F	11	Florent Piétrus	26 – 19 January 1981	2.01 m (6 ft 7 in)	Unicaja Málaga	(Spain)
G	12	Tariq Kirksay	27 – 7 September 1979	1.98 m (6 ft 6 in)	SLUC Nancy	(France)
G	13	Boris Diaw	25 – 16 April 1982	2.05 m (6 ft 9 in)	Phoenix Suns	(United States)
C	14	Ronny Turiaf	24 – 13 January 1983	2.06 m (6 ft 9 in)	Los Angeles Lakers	(United States)
C	15	Frédéric Weis	30 – 22 June 1977	2.18 m (7 ft 2 in)	Iurbentia Bilbao	(Spain)

Head coach

- Claude Bergeaud

Legend

- Club – describes last
  club before the tournament
- Age – describes age
  on 3 September 2007

=== Italy ===
Italy men's national basketball team roster
Players
Coaches

Pos.	No.	Name	Age – Date of birth	Height	Club
G	4	Marco Belinelli	21 – 25 March 1986	1.96 m (6 ft 5 in)	Golden State Warriors	(United States)
SG	5	Gianluca Basile	32 – 24 January 1975	1.92 m (6 ft 4 in)	FC Barcelona	(Spain)
F	6	Stefano Mancinelli	24 – 17 March 1983	2.08 m (6 ft 10 in)	Climamio Bologna	(Italy)
G/F	7	Matteo Soragna	31 – 26 December 1975	1.97 m (6 ft 6 in)	Benetton Treviso	(Italy)
C	8	Denis Marconato	32 – 29 July 1975	2.11 m (6 ft 11 in)	FC Barcelona	(Spain)
G	9	Marco Mordente	28 – 7 January 1979	1.90 m (6 ft 3 in)	Benetton Treviso	(Italy)
F	10	Andrea Bargnani	21 – 26 October 1985	2.12 m (6 ft 11 in)	Toronto Raptors	(Canada)
C	11	Andrea Crosariol	22 – 11 November 1984	2.13 m (7 ft 0 in)	VidiVici Bologna	(Italy)
G	12	Massimo Bulleri	29 – 10 September 1977	1.88 m (6 ft 2 in)	Armani Jeans Milano	(Italy)
PG	13	Fabio Di Bella	28 – 13 December 1978	1.87 m (6 ft 2 in)	VidiVici Bologna	(Italy)
F	14	Luigi Datome	19 – 27 November 1987	2.02 m (6 ft 8 in)	Legea Scafati	(Italy)
C	15	Angelo Gigli	24 – 4 June 1983	2.10 m (6 ft 11 in)	Benetton Treviso	(Italy)

Head coach

- Carlo Recalcati

Legend

- Club – describes last
  club before the tournament
- Age – describes age
  on 3 September 2007

=== Poland ===
Poland men's national basketball team roster
Players
Coaches

Pos.	No.	Name	Age – Date of birth	Height	Club
F	4	Bartłomiej Wołoszyn	21 – 9 August 1986	1.97 m (6 ft 6 in)	Anwil Włocławek	(Poland)
G	5	Andrzej Pluta	33 – 26 April 1974	1.81 m (5 ft 11 in)	Anwil Włocławek	(Poland)
G	6	Robert Skibniewski	24 – 19 July 1983	1.83 m (6 ft 0 in)	BOT Turów	(Poland)
F	7	Robert Witka	26 – 27 July 1981	2.07 m (6 ft 9 in)	BOT Turów	(Poland)
SF	8	Filip Dylewicz	27 – 25 January 1980	2.02 m (6 ft 8 in)	Prokom Trefl Sopot	(Poland)
F	9	Radosław Hyży	30 – 8 February 1977	2.02 m (6 ft 8 in)	Śląsk Wrocław	(Poland)
F	10	Adam Wójcik	37 – 20 April 1970	2.09 m (6 ft 10 in)	UPEA Capo d'Orlando	(Italy)
F	11	Kamil Pietras	19 – 27 January 1988	2.04 m (6 ft 8 in)	Olimpija Ljubljana	(Slovenia)
C	12	Szymon Szewczyk	24 – 21 December 1982	2.09 m (6 ft 10 in)	Lokomotiv Rostov	(Russia)
G	13	Iwo Kitzinger	22 – 26 February 1985	1.88 m (6 ft 2 in)	BOT Turów	(Poland)
F	14	Przemysław Frasunkiewicz	28 – 8 January 1979	2.01 m (6 ft 7 in)	Energa Czarni	(Poland)
G	15	Łukasz Koszarek	23 – 12 January 1984	1.87 m (6 ft 2 in)	Anwil Włocławek	(Poland)

Head coach

- (Slovenia) Andrej Urlep

Legend

- Club – describes last
  club before the tournament
- Age – describes age
  on 3 September 2007

=== Slovenia ===
Slovenia men's national basketball team roster
Players
Coaches

Pos.	No.	Name	Age – Date of birth	Height	Club	Ctr.
SG	4	Sandi Čebular	21 – 24 June 1986	1.96 m (6 ft 5 in)
G	5	Jaka Lakovič	29 – 9 July 1978	1.76 m (5 ft 9 in)	FC Barcelona	(Spain)
G	6	Aleksandar Ćapin	24 – 6 October 1982	1.86 m (6 ft 1 in)	Whirlpool Varese	(Italy)
PG	7	Goran Dragić	21 – 6 May 1986	1.91 m (6 ft 3 in)	TAU Cerámica	(Spain)
C	8	Radoslav Nesterović	31 – 30 May 1976	2.13 m (7 ft 0 in)	Toronto Raptors	(Canada)
F	9	Matjaž Smodiš	27 – 13 December 1979	2.05 m (6 ft 9 in)	CSKA Moscow	(Russia)
C	10	Uroš Slokar	24 – 14 May 1983	2.10 m (6 ft 11 in)	Triumph Lyubertsy	(Russia)
G	11	Jaka Klobučar	20 – 19 August 1987	1.98 m (6 ft 6 in)	Geoplin Slovan	(Slovenia)
F	12	Goran Jagodnik	33 – 23 May 1974	2.02 m (6 ft 8 in)	Hemofarm	(Serbia)
G	13	Domen Lorbek	22 – 6 March 1985	1.98 m (6 ft 6 in)	MMT Estudiantes	(Spain)
C	14	Gašper Vidmar	19 – 14 September 1987	2.10 m (6 ft 11 in)	Fenerbahçe Ülker	(Turkey)
C	15	Erazem Lorbek	23 – 21 February 1984	2.09 m (6 ft 10 in)	Lottomatica Roma	(Italy)

Head coach

- Aleš Pipan

Legend

- Club – describes last
  club before the tournament
- Age – describes age
  on 3 September 2007
