= 2006 FIBA World Championship squads =

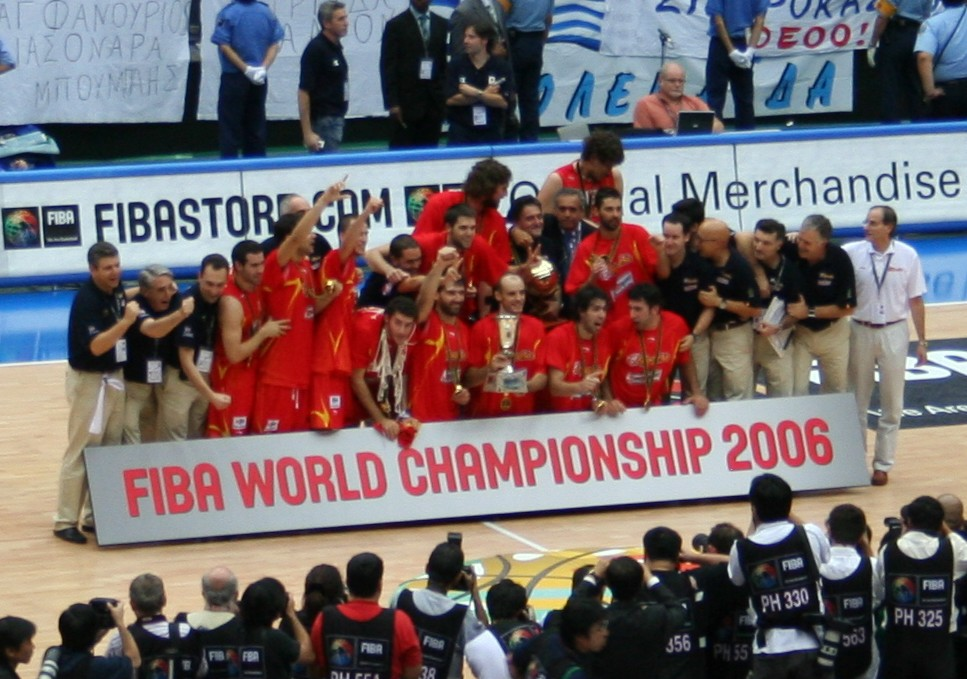
The winning team from Spain

The 2006 FIBA World Championship squads were the squads of the 2006 FIBA World Championship. The list includes the 12-men rosters of the 24 participating countries, totaling 288 players. Spain won the championship beating Greece.

== Group A ==
=== Argentina ===
Head coach: Sergio Hernández

#	Pos	Name	Year born	Team
4	Center	Luis Scola	1980	(Spain) TAU Cerámica
5	Guard	Manu Ginóbili	1977	(United States) San Antonio Spurs
6	Guard	Pepe Sánchez	1977	(Spain) Unicaja
7	Center	Fabricio Oberto	1975	(United States) San Antonio Spurs
8	Forward	Wálter Herrmann	1979	(United States) Charlotte Bobcats
9	Forward	Gabriel Fernández	1976	(Italy) Whirlpool Varese
10	Guard	Carlos Delfino	1982	(United States) Detroit Pistons
11	Guard	Pablo Prigioni	1977	(Spain) TAU Cerámica
12	Forward	Leonardo Gutiérrez	1978	(Argentina) Boca Juniors
13	Forward	Andrés Nocioni	1979	(United States) Chicago Bulls
14	Guard	Daniel Farabello	1976	(Italy) Whirlpool Varese
15	Center	Rubén Wolkowyski	1973	(Russia) Khimki

=== France ===
Head coach: Claude Bergeaud

#	Pos	Name	Year born	Team
4	Guard	Joseph Gomis	1978	(Spain) Grupo Capitol Valladolid
5	Forward	Mickaël Gelabale	1983	(United States) Seattle SuperSonics
6	Guard	Aymeric Jeanneau	1978	(France) Cholet
7	Forward	Laurent Foirest	1973	(France) ASVEL Villeurbanne
8	Guard	Mickaël Piétrus	1982	(United States) Golden State Warriors
9	Forward	Mamoutou Diarra	1980	(France) Chalon-sur-Saône
10	Guard	Yannick Bokolo	1985	(France) Le Mans
11	Forward	Florent Piétrus	1981	(Spain) Unicaja
12	Center	Johan Petro	1986	(United States) Seattle SuperSonics
13	Forward	Boris Diaw	1982	(United States) Phoenix Suns
14	Forward	Ronny Turiaf	1983	(United States) Los Angeles Lakers
15	Center	Frédéric Weis	1977	(Spain) Lagun Aro Bilbao

NB: Diarra replaced Tony Parker, who suffered a broken finger, just before the 24-hour deadline for submitting final squads.

=== Lebanon ===
Head coach: Paul Coughter

#	Pos	Name	Year born	Team
4	Guard	Jean Abdel-Nour	1983	(Lebanon) Blue Stars
5	Center	Hussein Tawbe	1982	(Lebanon) Al-Riyadhi
6	Guard	Ali Mahmoud	1983	(Lebanon) Al-Riyadhi
7	Guard	Rony Fahed	1981	(Lebanon) Blue Stars
8	Guard	Omar El Turk	1981	(Lebanon) Al-Riyadhi
9	Forward	Brian Beshara	1977	(Lebanon) Blue Stars
10	Forward	Bassem Balaa	1981	(Lebanon) Club Sagesse
11	Center	Joe Vogel	1973	(Lebanon) Al-Riyadhi
12	Forward	Ali Fakhreddine	1983	(Lebanon) Al-Riyadhi
13	Forward	Sabah Khoury	1982	(Lebanon) Champville
14	Center	Roy Samaha	1984	(Lebanon) Blue Stars
15	Forward	Fadi El Khatib	1979	(Lebanon) Club Sagesse

=== Nigeria ===
Head Coach: Sanni Ahmed

#	Pos	Name	Year born	Team
4	Guard	Josh Akognon	1986	(United States) Washington State Cougars
5	Forward	Ekene Ibekwe	1985	(United States) Maryland Terrapins
6	Guard	Chamberlain Oguchi	1986	(United States) Oregon Ducks
7	Forward	Ime Udoka	1977	(United States) New York Knicks
8	Guard	Ebi Ere	1981	(Belgium) Liège
9	Guard	Jeff Varem	1983	(France) Pau Orthez
10	Center	Julius Nwosu	1971	(Romania) CSU Asesoft Ploieşti
11	Forward	Derrick Obasohan	1981	(France) Hyères-Toulon
12	Forward	Tunji Awojobi	1973	(Israel) Hapoel Jerusalem
13	Forward	Gabe Muoneke	1978	(Turkey) Pınar Karşıyaka
14	Forward	Aloysius Anagonye	1981	(Spain) DKV Joventut
15	Center	Ikenne Nwankwo	1973	(Portugal) Madeira

=== Serbia and Montenegro ===
Head Coach: Dragan Šakota

#	Pos	Name	Year born	Team
4	Guard	Bojan Popović	1983	(Russia) Dynamo Moscow
5	Forward	Branko Jorović	1981	(Spain) Akasvayu Girona
6	Guard	Vule Avdalović	1981	(Spain) Pamesa Valencia
7	Center	Miroslav Raičević	1981	(Russia) Dynamo Moscow
8	Guard	Igor Rakočević	1978	(Spain) TAU Cerámica
9	Center	Mile Ilić	1984	(United States) New Jersey Nets
10	Guard	Uroš Tripković	1986	(Serbia and Montenegro) Partizan
11	Center	Darko Miličić	1985	(United States) Orlando Magic
12	Center	Goran Nikolić	1976	(Spain) MMT Estudiantes
13	Guard	Marko Marinović	1983	(Spain) Akasvayu Girona
14	Forward	Ognjen Aškrabić	1979	(Russia) Dynamo Saint Petersburg
15	Center	Kosta Perović	1985	(Serbia and Montenegro) Partizan

=== Venezuela ===
Head Coach: Néstor Salazar

#	Pos	Name	Year born	Team
4	Forward	Víctor David Díaz	1968	(Venezuela) Cocodrilos de Caracas
5	Center	Pablo Machado	1977	(Venezuela) Guaros de Lara
6	Guard	Ernesto Mijares	1976	(Venezuela) Marinos de Anzoátegui
7	Center	Richard Lugo	1973	(Venezuela) Trotamundos de Carabobo
8	Forward	Tomás Aguilera	1977	(Venezuela) Trotamundos de Carabobo
9	Forward	Óscar Torres	1976	(Russia) BC Khimki
10	Guard	Carlos Cedeño	1985	(Venezuela) Guaiqueríes de Margarita
11	Center	Miguel Ángel Marriaga	1984	(Venezuela) Gaiteros del Zulia
12	Forward	Gregory Vallenilla	1980	(Venezuela) Guaiqueríes de Margarita
13	Forward	Alejandro Barrios	1979	(Venezuela) Trotamundos de Carabobo
14	Center	Heberth Bayona	1978	(Venezuela) Guaiqueríes de Margarita
15	Forward	Carlos Morris	1975	(Venezuela) Gatos de Monagas

== Group B ==
=== Angola ===
Head coach: Alberto de Carvalho

#	Pos	Name	Year born	Team
4	Guard	Olímpio Cipriano	1982	(Angola) Primeiro de Agosto
5	Guard	Armando Costa	1983	(Angola) Primeiro de Agosto
6	Guard	Carlos Morais	1985	(Angola) Petro Atlético
7	Guard	Milton Barros	1984	(Angola) Petro Atlético
8	Guard	Luis Costa	1978	(Angola) Petro Atlético
9	Forward	Victor de Carvalho	1969	(Angola) Petro Atlético
10	Forward	Joaquim Gomes	1980	(Netherlands) EiffelTowers Den Bosch
11	Forward	Emanuel Neto	1984	(Angola) ASA
12	Center	Abdel Bouckar	1980	(Angola) Primeiro de Agosto
13	Guard	Carlos Almeida	1976	(Angola) Primeiro de Agosto
14	Guard	Miguel Lutonda	1971	(Angola) Primeiro de Agosto
15	Center	Eduardo Mingas	1979	(Angola) Petro Atlético

=== Germany ===
Head coach: Dirk Bauermann

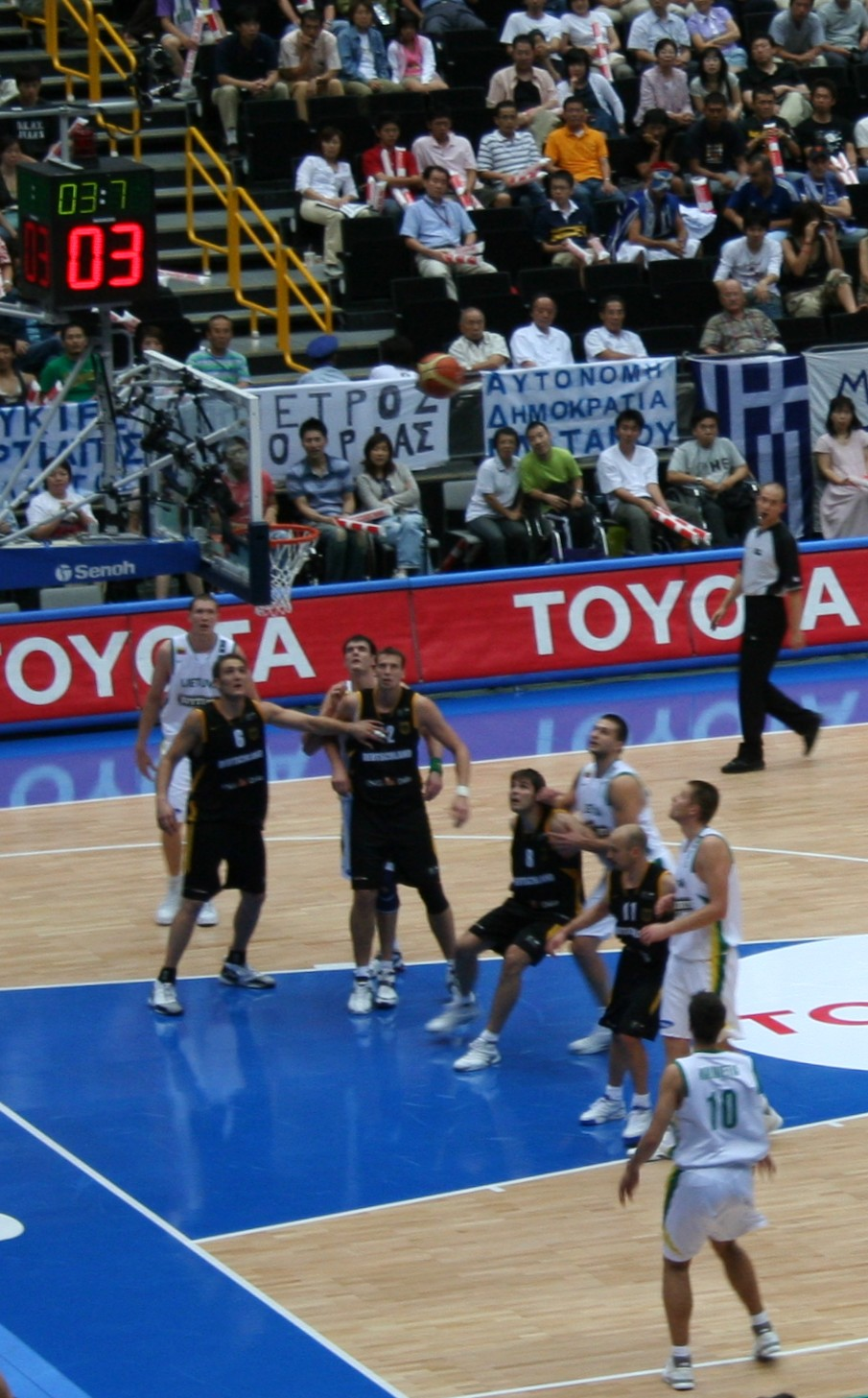
Germany (in black) playing against Lithuania

#	Pos	Name	Year born	Team
4	Guard	Mithat Demirel	1978	(Turkey) Galatasaray
5	Forward	Ademola Okulaja	1975	(Russia) Khimki
6	Forward	Sven Schultze	1978	(Italy) Armani Jeans Milano
7	Forward	Robert Garrett	1977	(Germany) GHP Bamberg
8	Guard	Johannes Herber	1983	(Germany) Alba Berlin
9	Guard	Steffen Hamann	1977	(Italy) Climamio Bologna
10	Guard	Demond Greene	1979	(Germany) Alba Berlin
11	Guard	Pascal Roller	1976	(Germany) Deutsche Bank Skyliners
12	Forward	Guido Grünheid	1982	(Germany) RheinEnergie Köln
13	Center	Patrick Femerling	1975	(Spain) Caja San Fernando
14	Forward	Dirk Nowitzki	1978	(United States) Dallas Mavericks
15	Center	Jan-Hendrik Jagla	1981	(Turkey) Turk Telekom Ankara

=== Japan ===
Head coach: Željko Pavličević

#	Pos	Name	Year born	Team
4	Guard	Takuya Kawamura	1986	(Japan) OSG Phoenix
5	Center	Daiji Yamada	1981	(Japan) Toyota Alvark
6	Forward	Ryota Sakurai	1983	(Japan) Toyota Alvark
7	Guard	Kei Igarashi	1980	(Japan) Hitachi Sunrockers
8	Guard	Shinsuke Kashiwagi	1981	(Japan) Aisin Seahorses
9	Guard	Takehiko Orimo	1970	(Japan) Toyota Alvark
10	Forward	Kosuke Takeuchi	1985	(Japan) Keio University
11	Forward	Tomoo Amino	1980	(Japan) Aisin Seahorses
12	Guard	Takahiro Setsumasa	1972	(Japan) Toshiba Brave
13	Forward	Satoru Furuta	1971	(Japan) Toyota Alvark
14	Forward	Shunsuke Ito	1979	(Japan) Toshiba Brave
15	Center	Joji Takeuchi	1985	(Japan) Tokai University

=== New Zealand ===
Head coach: Tab Baldwin

#	Pos	Name	Year born	Team
4	Guard	Mark Dickel	1976	(Russia) Lokomotiv Rostov
5	Guard	Aaron Olson	1978	New Zealand Breakers
6	Guard	Kirk Penney	1980	(Israel) Maccabi Tel Aviv
7	Guard	Paul Henare	1979	New Zealand Breakers
8	Guard	Phill Jones	1974	(Italy) Vertical Vision Cantù
9	Guard	Paora Winitana	1976	(New Zealand) Hawke's Bay Hawks
10	Guard	Dillon Boucher	1975	(Australia) Brisbane Bullets
11	Forward	Pero Cameron	1974	(Turkey) Bandirma Banvitspor
12	Forward	Mika Vukona	1982	(New Zealand) Nelson Giants
13	Forward	Casey Frank	1977	(New Zealand) Auckland Stars
14	Center	Craig Bradshaw	1983	(United States) Winthrop Eagles
15	Center	Tony Rampton	1976	(Australia) Wollongong Hawks

NB: Ben Hill was put on standby when Mark Dickel tested positive for cannabis after a July match against Australia. However his suspension did not rule him out from any Championship games.

=== Panama ===
Head coach: Guillermo Vecchio

#	Pos	Name	Year born	Team
4	Center	Rubén Garcés	1973	(Spain) Pamesa Valencia
5	Guard	Jair Peralta	1976	(Venezuela) Panteras de Miranda
6	Guard	Rubén Douglas	1979	(Spain) Pamesa Valencia
7	Guard	Maximiliano Gómez	1975	(Panama) Los Toros del Chorrillo
8	Center	Kevin Daley	1976	(United States) Harlem Globetrotters
9	Center	Jamaal Levy	1983	(Uruguay) Atlético Bigua
10	Forward	Dionisio Gómez	1980	(Argentina) Central Entrerriano
11	Guard	Michael Hicks	1976	(Italy) Scavolini Pesaro
12	Guard	Ed Cota	1976	(Israel) Hapoel Jerusalem
13	Forward	Antonio García	1976	(Panama) Los Toros del Chorrillo
14	Forward	Jaime Lloreda	1980	(Saudi Arabia) Al-Ittihad
15	Center	Eric Cárdenas	1973	(Uruguay) Defensor

=== Spain ===
Head coach: Pepu Hernández

#	Pos	Name	Year born	Team
4	Center	Pau Gasol	1980	(United States) Memphis Grizzlies
5	Forward	Rudy Fernández	1985	(Spain) DKV Joventut
6	Guard	Carlos Cabezas	1980	(Spain) Unicaja
7	Guard	Juan Carlos Navarro	1980	(Spain) FC Barcelona
8	Guard	José Manuel Calderón	1981	(Canada) Toronto Raptors
9	Center	Felipe Reyes	1980	(Spain) Real Madrid
10	Forward	Carlos Jiménez	1976	(Spain) Estudiantes
11	Guard	Sergio Rodríguez	1986	(Spain) Estudiantes
12	Guard	Berni Rodríguez	1980	(Spain) Unicaja
13	Center	Marc Gasol	1985	(Spain) Akasvayu Girona
14	Forward	Álex Mumbrú	1979	(Spain) DKV Joventut
15	Forward	Jorge Garbajosa	1977	(Spain) Unicaja

== Group C ==
=== Australia ===
Head coach: Brian Goorjian

#	Pos	Name	Year born	Team
4	Center	Andrew Bogut	1984	(United States) Milwaukee Bucks
5	Forward	David Barlow	1983	(Australia) Sydney Kings
6	Forward	Sam Mackinnon	1976	(Australia) Brisbane Bullets
7	Guard	Luke Kendall	1978	(Australia) Sydney Kings
8	Forward	Brad Newley	1982	(Australia) Townsville Crocodiles
9	Forward	C. J. Bruton	1978	(Australia) Brisbane Bullets
10	Forward	Jason Smith	1974	(Australia) Sydney Kings
11	Forward	Mark Worthington	1983	(Australia) Sydney Kings
12	Forward	Daniel Kickert	1983	(United States) Saint Mary's Gaels
13	Center	Russell Hinder	1975	(Australia) Sydney Kings
14	Guard	Aaron Bruce	1984	(United States) Baylor Bears
15	Center	Wade Helliwell	1979	(Italy) Lottomatica Roma

=== Brazil ===
Head coach: Lula Ferreira

#	Pos	Name	Year born	Team
4	Guard	Marcelo Machado	1975	(Lithuania) Žalgiris Kaunas
5	Guard	Nezinho dos Santos	1985	(Brazil) COC Ribeirão Preto
6	Forward	Murilo Becker	1983	(Brazil) Franca
7	Center	Estevam Ferreira	1978	(Brazil) Unitri/Uberlândia
8	Guard	Leandro Barbosa	1982	(United States) Phoenix Suns
9	Guard	Marcelinho Huertas	1983	(Spain) DKV Joventut
10	Guard	Alex Garcia	1980	(Brazil) COC Ribeirão Preto
11	Forward	Anderson Varejão	1982	(United States) Cleveland Cavaliers
12	Forward	Guilherme Giovannoni	1980	(Italy) Virtus Bologna
13	Center	Caio Torres	1987	(Spain) MMT Estudiantes
14	Center	André Bambu	1979	(Brazil) Joinville
15	Center	Tiago Splitter	1985	(Spain) TAU Cerámica

=== Greece ===
Head coach: Panagiotis Giannakis

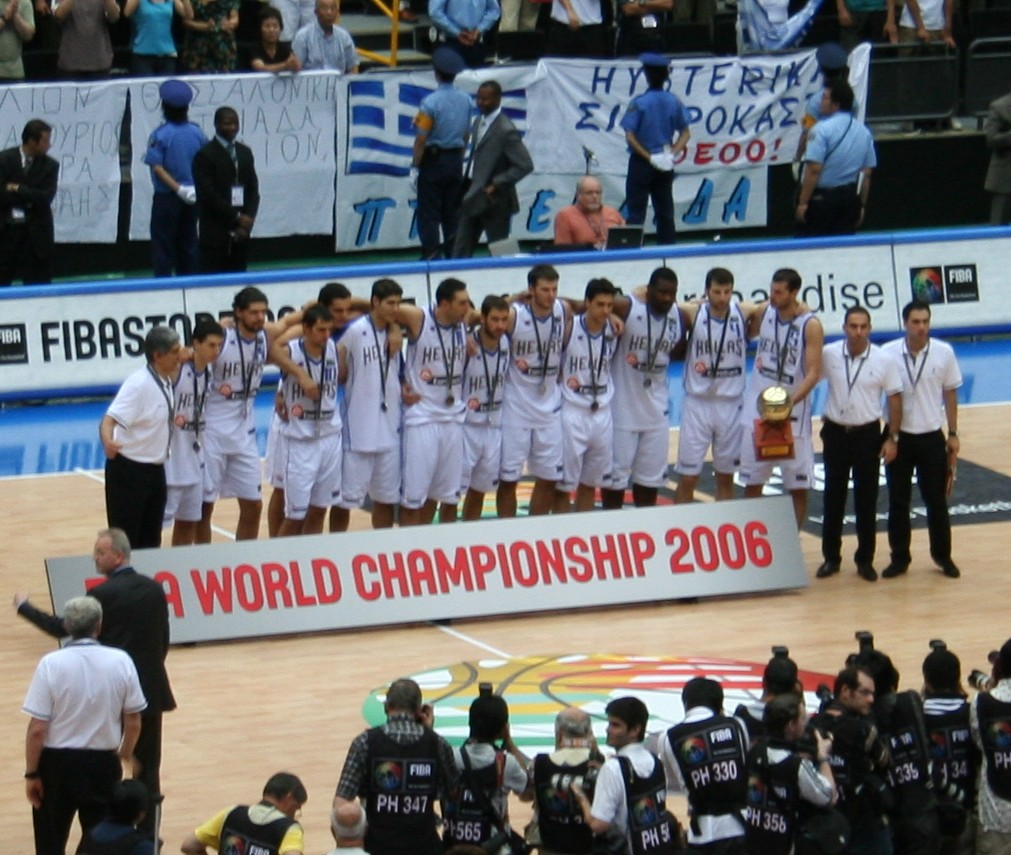
The Greek team, winners of the Silver Medal

#	Pos	Name	Year born	Team
4	Guard	Theodoros Papaloukas	1977	(Russia) CSKA Moscow
5	Center	Sofoklis Schortsanitis	1985	(Greece) Olympiacos
6	Guard	Nikos Zisis	1983	(Italy) Benetton Treviso
7	Guard	Vassilis Spanoulis	1982	(Greece) Panathinaikos
8	Forward	Panagiotis Vasilopoulos	1984	(Greece) Olympiacos
9	Forward	Antonis Fotsis	1981	(Russia) Dynamo Moscow
10	Guard	Nikos Chatzivrettas	1977	(Greece) Panathinaikos
11	Forward	Dimos Dikoudis	1977	(Spain) Valencia
12	Forward	Kostas Tsartsaris	1979	(Greece) Panathinaikos
13	Guard	Dimitris Diamantidis	1980	(Greece) Panathinaikos
14	Center	Lazaros Papadopoulos	1980	(Russia) Dynamo Moscow
15	Forward	Michalis Kakiouzis	1976	(Spain) Barcelona

=== Lithuania ===
Head coach: Antanas Sireika

#	Pos	Name	Year born	Team
4	Guard	Tomas Delininkaitis	1982	(Lithuania) Lietuvos Rytas
5	Forward	Mindaugas Žukauskas	1975	(Italy) Scavolini Pesaro
6	Guard	Arvydas Macijauskas	1980	(Greece) Olympiacos
7	Forward	Darjuš Lavrinovič	1979	(Russia) UNICS Kazan
8	Guard	Giedrius Gustas	1980	(Russia) Dynamo Moscow
9	Forward	Darius Songaila	1978	(United States) Washington Wizards
10	Guard	Mantas Kalnietis	1986	(Lithuania) Žalgiris Kaunas
11	Forward	Linas Kleiza	1985	(United States) Denver Nuggets
12	Center	Kšyštof Lavrinovič	1979	(Russia) UNICS Kazan
13	Guard	Simas Jasaitis	1982	(Israel) Maccabi Tel Aviv
14	Forward	Paulius Jankūnas	1984	(Lithuania) Žalgiris Kaunas
15	Center	Robertas Javtokas	1980	(Greece) Panathinaikos

=== Qatar ===
Head Coach: Joseph Stiebing

#	Pos	Name	Year born	Team
4	Guard	Khalid Masoud Al Nasr	1980	(Qatar) Al-Arabi
5	Guard	Malek Saleem	1985	(Qatar) Al-Rayyan
6	Guard	Saad Abdulrahman	1985	(Qatar) Al-Sadd
7	Guard	Daoud Musa	1982	Qatar Club
8	Forward	Khalid Suliman	1987	(Qatar) Al-Sadd
9	Forward	Ali Turki	1982	(Qatar) Al Jaysh
10	Forward	Baker Ahmad	1986	(Qatar) Al-Rayyan
11	Forward	Erfan Ali Saeed	1983	(Qatar) Al-Rayyan
12	Center	Mohammed Saleem	1982	(Qatar) Al-Rayyan
13	Forward	Hammam Omer	1983	(Qatar) Al-Wakrah
14	Center	Hashim Zaidan	1980	(Qatar) Al-Ahli
15	Center	Omer Abdelqader	1983	(Qatar) Al-Rayyan

=== Turkey ===
Head coach: Bogdan Tanjević

#	Pos	Name	Year born	Team
4	Guard	Cenk Akyol	1987	(Turkey) Efes Pilsen
5	Center	Ermal Kurtoğlu	1980	(Turkey) Efes Pilsen
6	Guard	Engin Atsür	1984	(United States) North Carolina State Wolfpack
7	Guard	Ender Arslan	1983	(Turkey) Efes Pilsen
8	Forward	Ersan İlyasova	1987	(United States) Milwaukee Bucks
9	Guard	Serkan Erdoğan	1978	(Spain) TAU Cerámica
10	Forward	İbrahim Kutluay	1974	(Turkey) Ülkerspor
11	Center	Fatih Solak	1980	(Turkey) Galatasaray
12	Center	Kerem Gönlüm	1977	(Turkey) Efes Pilsen
13	Center	Semih Erden	1986	(Turkey) Ülkerspor
14	Center	Kaya Peker	1980	(Spain) TAU Cerámica
15	Guard	Hakan Demirel	1986	(Turkey) Ülkerspor

== Group D ==
=== China ===
Head coach: Jonas Kazlauskas

#	Pos	Name	Year born	Team
4	Guard	Chen Jianghua	1989	(China) Guangdong Southern Tigers
5	Guard	Liu Wei	1980	(China) Shanghai Sharks
6	Guard	Zhang Qingpeng	1985	(China) Liaoning Hunters
7	Forward	Wang Shipeng	1983	(China) Guangdong Southern Tigers
8	Forward	Zhu Fangyu	1983	(China) Guangdong Southern Tigers
9	Guard	Sun Yue	1985	(China) Beijing Aoshen Olympian
10	Center	Zhang Songtao	1985	(China) Beijing Aoshen Olympian
11	Center	Yi Jianlian	1987	(China) Guangdong Southern Tigers
12	Center	Mo Ke	1982	(China) Bayi Rockets
13	Center	Yao Ming	1980	(United States) Houston Rockets
14	Center	Wang Zhizhi	1979	(China) Bayi Rockets
15	Forward	Du Feng	1981	(China) Guangdong Southern Tigers

NB: Age discrepancies exist for at least two of these players. Yi's age is currently a subject of controversy, with several reports indicating that he was actually born in 1984. Wang Zhizhi's passport lists his year of birth as 1979, but the NBA, where he played for several years, lists him as having been born in 1977.

=== Italy ===
Head coach: Carlo Recalcati

#	Pos	Name	Year born	Team
4	Guard	Fabio Di Bella	1978	(Italy) VidiVici Bologna
5	Guard	Gianluca Basile	1975	(Spain) FC Barcelona
6	Forward	Stefano Mancinelli	1983	(Italy) Climamio Bologna
7	Guard	Matteo Soragna	1975	(Italy) Benetton Treviso
8	Center	Denis Marconato	1975	(Spain) FC Barcelona
9	Guard	Marco Belinelli	1986	(Italy) Climamio Bologna
10	Guard	Andrea Pecile	1980	(Italy) Montepaschi Siena
11	Forward	Andrea Michelori	1978	(Italy) VidiVici Bologna
12	Forward	Mason Rocca	1977	(Italy) Carpisa Napoli
13	Guard	Marco Mordente	1979	(Italy) Benetton Treviso
14	Center	Luca Garri	1982	(Italy) Lottomatica Roma
15	Forward	Angelo Gigli	1983	(Italy) Benetton Treviso

=== Puerto Rico ===
Head coach: Julio Toro

#	Pos	Name	Year born	Team
4	Center	Peter John Ramos	1985	(United States) Washington Wizards
5	Forward	Angelo Reyes	1982	(Puerto Rico) Criollos de Caguas
6	Guard	Roberto Hatton	1977	(Puerto Rico) Ponce Lions
7	Guard	Carlos Arroyo	1979	(United States) Orlando Magic
8	Guard	Rick Apodaca	1980	(Poland) Polpak Świecie
9	Guard	Christian Dalmau	1975	(Poland) Prokom Trefl Sopot
10	Guard	Larry Ayuso	1977	(Puerto Rico) Arecibo Captains
11	Forward	Antonio Latimer	1978	(Puerto Rico) San German Athletics
12	Guard	Filiberto Rivera	1982	(Puerto Rico) Criollos de Caguas
13	Center	Manuel Narvaez	1981	(Puerto Rico) Ponce Lions
14	Forward	Carmelo Antrone Lee	1977	(Puerto Rico) Guaynabo Conquistadores
15	Center	Daniel Santiago	1976	(Spain) Unicaja Málaga

=== Senegal ===
Head coach: Moustapha Gaye

#	Pos	Name	Year born	Team
4	Center	Makthar N'Diaye	1972	(France) Levallois
5	Guard	El Kabir Pene	1984	(France) Clermont-Ferrand
6	Guard	Pape Ibrahim Faye	1980	(Qatar) Al Rayyan
7	Guard	Babacar Cissé	1976	(France) Le Havre
8	Forward	Sitapha Savané	1978	(Spain) Gran Canaria Grupo Dunas
9	Forward	Maleye N'Doye	1980	(France) Dijon
10	Guard	Mamadou Diouf	1983	(Japan) Sendai 89ers
11	Forward	Souleymane Aw	1981	(Senegal) ASCC BOPP
12	Forward	Moustapha Niang	1977	(France) Chorale Roanne
13	Center	Mamadou N'Diaye	1975	(Greece) PAOK
14	Center	Ndongo N'Diaye	1977	(Angola) Primeiro de Agosto
15	Forward	Malick Badiane	1984	(Germany) Deutsche Bank Skyliners

=== Slovenia ===
Head coach: Aleš Pipan

#	Pos	Name	Year born	Team
4	Forward	Goran Jurak	1977	(Italy) Vertical Vision Cantù
5	Guard	Jaka Lakovič	1978	(Spain) FC Barcelona
6	Guard	Sašo Ožbolt	1981	(Slovenia) Olimpija Ljubljana
7	Guard	Sani Bečirovič	1981	(Greece) Panathinaikos
8	Center	Radoslav Nesterović	1976	(Canada) Toronto Raptors
9	Guard	Beno Udrih	1982	(United States) San Antonio Spurs
10	Forward	Boštjan Nachbar	1981	(United States) New Jersey Nets
11	Forward	Željko Zagorac	1981	(Slovenia) Domžale
12	Guard	Marko Milič	1977	(Slovenia) Olimpija Ljubljana
13	Guard	Goran Dragić	1986	(Slovenia) Slovan Ljubljana
14	Center	Uroš Slokar	1983	(Canada) Toronto Raptors
15	Center	Primož Brezec	1979	(United States) Charlotte Bobcats

=== United States ===
Head coach: Mike Krzyzewski

#	Pos	Name	Year born	Team
4	Guard	Joe Johnson	1981	(United States) Atlanta Hawks
5	Guard	Kirk Hinrich	1981	(United States) Chicago Bulls
6	Forward	LeBron James	1984	(United States) Cleveland Cavaliers
7	Forward	Antawn Jamison	1976	(United States) Washington Wizards
8	Forward	Shane Battier	1978	(United States) Houston Rockets
9	Guard	Dwyane Wade	1982	(United States) Miami Heat
10	Guard	Chris Paul	1985	(United States) New Orleans Hornets
11	Center	Chris Bosh	1984	(Canada) Toronto Raptors
12	Center	Dwight Howard	1985	(United States) Orlando Magic
13	Center	Brad Miller	1976	(United States) Sacramento Kings
14	Forward	Elton Brand	1979	(United States) Los Angeles Clippers
15	Forward	Carmelo Anthony	1984	(United States) Denver Nuggets
