= Ivan Ilić =

Ivan Ilić may refer to:

- Ivan Ilić (footballer, born 1971), Serbian footballer
- Ivan Ilić (footballer, born 2001), Serbian footballer
- Ivan Ilić (pianist) (born 1978), Serbian-American pianist living in Paris
- Ivan Ilić (volleyball) (born 1976), Serbian volleyball player

== See also ==
- Ivan Illich (1926–2002), Austrian philosopher and Roman Catholic priest
