= 1998 FIBA Africa Under-18 Championship squads =

This article displays the rosters for the participating teams at the 1998 FIBA Africa Championship.

== Egypt ==
Egypt men's national U18 basketball team – 2008 FIBA Africa Championship – Silver Medal roster
Players
Coaches

Pos.	No.	Name	Age – Date of birth	Height	Club	Ctr.
F		Hany Elbanna	17 – 16 November 1980	1.98 m (6 ft 6 in)
		Osama Hussein	18 – 2 January 1980
C		Ramy Gunady	16 – 20 December 1981	1.86 m (6 ft 1 in)
		Sherif Mohamed Hussein	17 – 16 September 1980
		Ahmed Mounir	–
C		Amir Fanan	17 – 28 October 1980	1.90 m (6 ft 3 in)
G		Mohamed El-Sehrty	18 – 3 January 1980	1.98 m (6 ft 6 in)
		Shady Abdallah	–
G		Khaled El-Kirdani	18 – 18 July 1980	1.85 m (6 ft 1 in)
C		Shaaban Badran	17 – 27 October 1980	2.11 m (6 ft 11 in)
G		Kareem Sarhan	17 – 18 February 1981	1.90 m (6 ft 3 in)
G		Mostafa Khedr	18 – 1 January 1980	1.86 m (6 ft 1 in)

Head coach

- (Egypt) Fathi Shehata

Assistant coach

Legend

- (C) Team captain
- Club field describes current club
