= Marija Ilić =

Marija Ilić may refer to:

- Marija Ilić (footballer) (born 1993), Serbian football defender
- Marija D. Ilić (born 1951), Serbian-American electrical engineer
- Marija Ilić Agapova (1895–1984), Serbian jurist and librarian
- Marija Ilić (Serbian basketball player) (born 1998), Serbian basketball player
- Marija Ilić (German basketball player) (born 2007), German basketball player
- Marija Ilić (footballer, born 2003), Serbian football midfielder
