= Aleksandar Ilić =

Aleksandar Ilić may refer to:

- Aleksandar Ilić (politician) (born 1945), politician, diplomat and professor of literature at Belgrade University
- Aleksandar "Sanja" Ilić (1951–2021), Serbian and Yugoslav musician and composer
- Aleksandar Ilić (footballer, born 1969), Serbian football manager and former footballer
- Aleksandar Ilić (footballer, born 1994), Bosnian Serb footballer
