= Lance Williams =

Lance Williams may refer to:

- Lance Williams (graphics researcher) (1949–2017), creator of mipmapping
- Lance Williams, San Francisco Chronicle reporter and author of the book Game of Shadows, see Lance Williams and Mark Fainaru-Wada
- Lance Williams (basketball) (born 1980), American basketball player
