= Mile Ilić =

Serbian basketball player (born 1984)

- Born: 2 June 1984 (age 42); Tuzla, SR Bosnia and Herzegovina, SFR Yugoslavia

YouTube information
- Channel: Jao Mile podcast
- Years active: 2022–present
- Genre: Basketball
- Subscribers: 117 thousand
- Views: 105.1 million
- Basketball career

Personal information
- Listed height: 7 ft 1 in (2.16 m)
- Listed weight: 229 lb (104 kg)

Career information
- NBA draft: 2005: 2nd round, 43rd overall pick
- Drafted by: New Jersey Nets
- Playing career: 2002–2020
- Position: Center
- Number: 5, 9, 33

Career history
- 2002–2006: FMP
- 2006–2007: New Jersey Nets
- 2007: →Colorado 14ers
- 2008: Bilbao Berri
- 2008–2009: Cajasol
- 2010: Metalac Valjevo
- 2010–2011: FMP
- 2011–2012: Crvena zvezda
- 2013: Vojvodina Srbijagas
- 2013–2014: Mahram Tehran
- 2014: MIA Academy
- 2015: Qatar Club
- 2015–2016: Lietkabelis
- 2016–2017: Al Nuwaidrat
- 2017: Tadamon Zouk
- 2017: Al Nuwaidrat
- 2018: Al Mouttahed Tripoli
- 2018–2019: Al-Manama
- 2019: Al Seeb
- 2019: Al-Ahli
- 2019–2020: Baniyas

Career highlights
- 2× Adriatic League champion (2004, 2006); Serbian Cup winner (2005)
- Stats at Basketball Reference
- Last updated: 1 September 2026

Mile Ilić (Serbian Cyrillic: Миле Илић; born 2 June 1984) is a Serbian podcaster and former professional basketball player.

Known in Serbia as Jao Mile (word play referencing Yao Ming and the Serbian expression for ouch, jao), the 2.15-metre-tall (7'1") center won two Adriatic League championships with KK FMP. Additionally, he played with the New Jersey Nets of the National Basketball Association (NBA) during the 2006–07 season, having been drafted one year earlier as the 43rd overall pick.

== Early life and career ==
Born to a Serb family in Tuzla, SR Bosnia and Herzegovina, SFR Yugoslavia due to it being the nearest town with a maternity ward, young Mile was raised in a Lopare area settlement of Priboj together with two older siblings, including sister Slavica (born 1973) who would soon begin pursuing basketball with the Jedinstvo Aida youth squads and eventually grow to 193 cm in height.

After coming up through the Jedinstvo Aida youth system for years, in 1990, youngster Mile's sixteen-year-old sister Slavica Ilić made the team's full squad as replacement at center for celebrated future FIBA Hall of Famer Razija Mujanović who had just transferred abroad to play with CB Godella in Spain.

With the outbreak of the Bosnian War in spring 1992, eighteen-year-old Slavica fled the armed conflict area for Belgrade, Serbia where she resumed playing professionally, finding a spot on the ŽKK Partizan roster quickly. Several months later, during summer 1992, her younger eight-year-old brother Mile, who had just finished the first grade of elementary school, was sent by their parents to join her, while the parents and the middle brother stayed behind in their Serb majority home village that had by this time become the scene of fierce shelling by the Muslim forces from the neighbouring hillside settlement of Teočak. Their father soon joined the armed conflict, fighting as part of the Republika Srpska Army (VRS). Meanwhile, in Belgrade, joining his eighteen-year-old professional basketball player sister, eight-year-old child Mile, by his own admission in interviews decades later, initially spent majority of his day riding the city's public transit while waiting for his sister to finish her daily basketball practices. In September 1992, he resumed his schooling, starting second grade at a primary school in Belgrade. However, being cared and provided for by his teenage sister only, without any parental supervision, soon proved untenable and, following a disciplinary incident at school, a decision was made for him to return to his parents in the war zone. The youngster spent the following year and a half attending school in makeshift facilities in his village, before going back to Belgrade in 1994 to rejoin his sister.

Upon returning to Belgrade, encouraged by his sister Slavica, the tall ten-year-old began practicing basketball by enrolling in KK Partizan's youth categories coached by Aleksandar Bućan. Living with his older sister in a Konjarnik neighbourhood apartment provided for by her basketball salary, in addition to attending primary school, pre-teen Mile bussed to Partizan youth team practices at the 20th October Elementary School gym facilities on the other side of Belgrade in Blok 70.

By 1996, Slavica Ilić secured a transfer abroad to France with Stade Clermontois BF and twelve-year-old Mile rejoined their parents by moving back to Bosnia where the war had ended in the meantime. Still in primary school, he continued pursuing basketball, this time within the KK Rudar Ugljevik youth categories.

Though now part of a small provincial club well off the radar for most basketball scouts, teenage Ilić kept drawing attention due to his exceptional height and, by 1999, he was scouted by KK Hemofarm's head coach Željko Lukajić who facilitated the fifteen-year-old's tryout at the Vršac club's youth system. Following the late summer 1999 tryout, during which Hemofarm's youth team head coach Petar Rodić reportedly liked teenage Ilić's skills, the youngster still did not get placed on the team due to the club's 1999-00 youth squad already being completed. Instead, he returned to Ugljevik where he even enrolled in a local high school. Some ten days later, however, the team created a roster spot for him and the tall teenager joined KK Hemofarm, a club financed by the state-owned pharmaceutical company of the same name led by CEO Miodrag Babić.

Coached by Rodić, teenage Ilić played for the KK Hemofarm youth team alongside fellow youngsters Darko Miličić, Miljan Pupović, Nenad Mišanović, Vukašin Aleksić, Marko Kolarić, Nikola Tutuš, etc.

== Playing career ==
=== FMP ===
After three seasons in KK Hemofarm's youth system, seeing his opportunities of entering the club's first team limited, Ilić decided to unilaterally leave Vršac during summer 2002 and transfer to YUBA League rivals FMP. The legal basis he took advantage of for doing so was an unmet clause in his stipend-based contract at Hemofarm that stipulated the club's obligation to provide the youth player with a professional contract by the time he turns eighteen years of age.

Arriving in Železnik, to a club run by club president and owner Nebojša Čović and sporting director Ratko Radovanović, eighteen-year-old Ilić thus started his first team, full squad career.

In the 2005 NBA draft he was drafted by the New Jersey Nets as a 43rd overall pick.

=== New Jersey Nets ===
Having been drafted one year earlier in 2005, Ilić signed for the Nets on 13 September 2006 once a roster spot opened due to Zoran Planinić leaving the club. Initially, twenty-two-year-old Ilić was brought in as a foreseeable future backup for countryman Nenad Krstić with the Nets' general manager Ed Stefanski singling out Ilić's lateral movement, pick-and-roll, and defensive help as well as his overall adaptation to the speed of the NBA game as the areas the NBA rookie needs to improve in.

On 26 February 2007 the Nets assigned him to the Colorado 14ers, their NBA Development League affiliate. Ilić thus became the first player that the Nets assigned to the D-League since instituting affiliate teams (prior to the 2005–06 NBA season). Playing for the 14ers based out of Broomfield, Colorado, his Development League season ended early due to an ankle joint injury in early April 2007. The injury would end up having a major impact on his basketball career in subsequent years.

On 29 October 2007 he was traded by the Nets to New Orleans Hornets along with Bernard Robinson for David Wesley (both Ilić and Robinson were immediately waived by the Hornets).

=== Return to Europe ===
After getting waived in the NBA, Ilić returned to Europe and signed with Lokomotiv Rostov on 26 November 2007. However, he never managed to play for the Russian club due to the effects of the nagging ankle injury he had picked up in the United States and then exacerbated at the EuroBasket 2007 training camp with Serbia national team. Instead, the center went back home to Serbia in order to further rehab his ankle.

==== Spain ====
On 24 February 2008, midway through the 2007–08 season, Ilić signed with the Spanish ACB league club CB Bilbao Berri. Hampered by the recovery process from the ankle injury, he only appeared in 10 games for the club, averaging 5.6 points and 4.1 rebounds per game.

On 28 July 2008, Ilić signed with CB Sevilla for the 2008–09 season. Playing on a squad with compatriot Duško Savanović under head coach Pedro Martínez, Ilić's not-fully-healed ankle injury got exacerbated again and he started missing games again. On 27 March 2009, he parted ways with Sevilla after averaging only 2 points and 2 rebounds per game.

The 2009–10 season began with Ilić without a club as teams shied away from acquiring the tall center due to concerns over his re-occurring ankle injury.

==== Seasons in Serbia ====
After ten months away from competitive basketball, Ilić found a club in March 2010, signing for the remainder of the season with Metalac Valjevo that decided to acquire him after qualifying for the Superleague stage of their Serbian Basketball League campaign.

For the 2010–11 season he returned to FMP.

The 2011–12 season he played with Crvena zvezda. In March 2013, signed with Vojvodina Srbijagas for the 2012–13 Serbian Superleague season.

=== Seasons in the Middle East and stints in Georgia and Lithuania ===
In October 2013, Ilić signed with Mahram Tehran BC of the Iranian Super League. In January 2014, he left Tehran and signed with MIA Academy of the Georgian Super Liga for the rest of the season.

In 2015, Ilić played for Qatar Sports Club of the Qatari League. On 17 October 2015 he signed with the Lithuanian club Lietkabelis Panevėžys.

In September 2016, Ilić signed with Nuwaidrat of the Bahraini Premier League. At the end of March 2017, Ilić signed with Tadamon Zouk of the Lebanese Basketball League. In July 2017, he returned to Nuwaidrat. In September 2018, Ilić signed for a Bahraini club Al Itihad.

In summer 2019, Ilić played for Al Seeb of the Oman League. In July 2019, he signed for a Bahraini club Al-Ahli. Prior to the 2019–20 season, Ilić signed for Baniyas of the UAE National League.

== National team ==
During late August 2003, nineteen-year-old Ilić represented Serbia-Montenegro at the 2003 Summer Universiade in Daegu, South Korea as part of the country's university basketball team. The makeshift squad consisting of ten FMP players plus Borac Čačak's Milan Bralović and Marko Marinović was put together on a short notice by FMP's head coach Vlade Đurović. Following an arduous 36-hour journey from Belgrade via London, Hong Kong, Taipei, and Seoul, the team arrived in Daegu less than 12 hours before its opening game, a hard-fought win versus Chinese Taipei. Serbia-Montenegro ended up winning gold.

=== Full squad ===
==== 2006 FIBA World Championship ====
In summer 2006, fresh off winning the Adriatic League title with FMP, Ilić was called up for national team duty by head coach Dragan Šakota as part of Serbia and Montenegro's selection process for the upcoming 2006 FIBA World Championship in Japan. The center ended up making the 12-man roster taken to the tournament where he played as backup to Darko Miličić.

One year later, Ilić was called up by the new head coach Moka Slavnić to the training camp for EuroBasket 2007. Carrying an ankle injury from his time in the U.S., hesitant Ilić still showed up on the insistence of head coach Slavnić who reportedly called the player personally on multiple occasions, convincing him eventually. At the training camp, Ilić exacerbated his ankle injury and in the end did not make the 12-man roster, with Slavnić picking Miličić and Dragan Labović for center spots. Together with Aleksandar Rašić, Ilić was among the last two players cut from the squad in late August 2007, right before the start of the championship.

At the beginning of summer 2011, after completing a return season with FMP, Ilić was called up by the Serbia national team head coach Dušan Ivković for the EuroBasket 2011 training camp. Ilić made it to the last 16, this time, before getting cut by Ivković in early August 2011 together with Novica Veličković.

== Career statistics ==
Legend
| GP | Games played | GS | Games started | MPG | Minutes per game |
| FG% | Field goal percentage | 3P% | 3-point field goal percentage | FT% | Free throw percentage |
| RPG | Rebounds per game | APG | Assists per game | SPG | Steals per game |
| BPG | Blocks per game | PPG | Points per game | **Bold** | Career high |

=== NBA ===
==== Regular season ====
| Year | Team | GP | GS | MPG | FG% | 3P% | FT% | RPG | APG | SPG | BPG | PPG |
|---|---|---|---|---|---|---|---|---|---|---|---|---|
| 2006–07 | New Jersey | 5 | 0 | 1.2 | .000 | — | — | .2 | .0 | .0 | .0 | .0 |

== Post-playing career ==
In March 2022, Ilić started his podcast show named Jao Mile.

== See also ==
- List of Serbian NBA players
