= Illich =

Illich is both a given name and a surname. Notable people with the name include:

- Illich Guardiola (born 1972), American voice actor
- Isaak Illich Rubin (1886–1937), Russian economist
- Ivan Illich (1926–2002), Austrian philosopher and anarchist social critic

== See also ==
- Ilić
- Vladislav Illich-Svitych
