= Jia Xiaozhong =

Chinese basketball player

Jia Xiaozhong 贾孝忠
Personal information
- Born: Changzhou, Jiangsu, China
- Listed height: 6.75 ft 0 in (2.06 m)

Career information
- Playing career: 1997–2006
- Position: Power forward

Career history
- 1997–2006: Shanghai Sharks

Career highlights
- 1× CBA champion (2001-02)

Jia Xiaozhong (Chinese: 贾孝忠, born March 19, 1980) is a former professional basketball player from China. He played as a Power forward and was formerly on the roster of the Shanghai Sharks.
