= Raitis Grafs =

Latvian basketball player

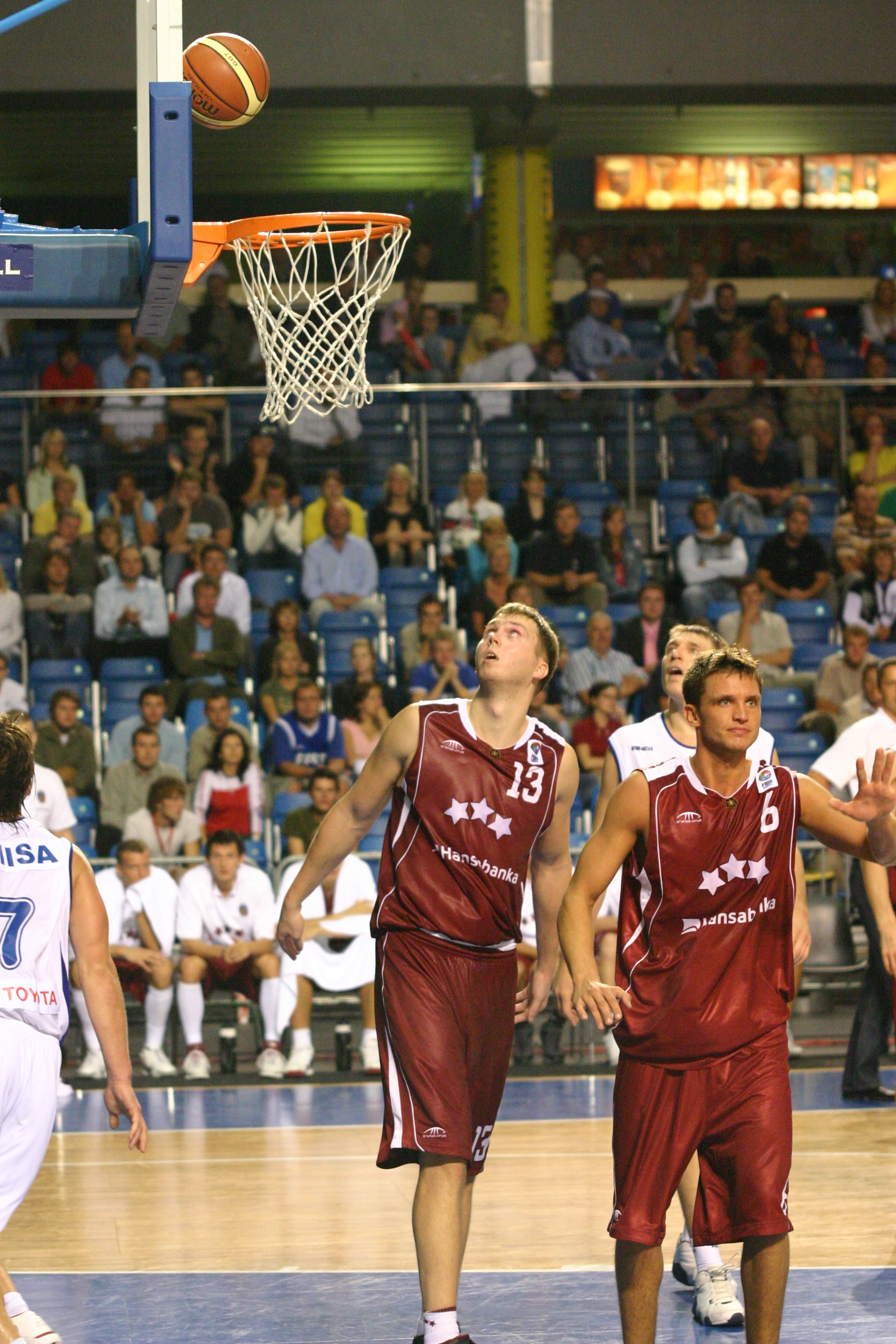
- Raitis Grafs (left) with Armands Šķēle playing against Estonia in 2006.

Personal information
- Born: June 12, 1981 (age 45) Riga, Latvian SSR, Soviet Union
- Listed height: 6 ft 11 in (2.11 m)
- Listed weight: 240 lb (109 kg)

Career information
- College: Valparaiso (1999–2003)
- NBA draft: 2003: undrafted
- Playing career: 1997–2014, 2016
- Position: Center
- Number: 5, 13

Career history
- 1997–1999: Broceni Riga
- 2003–2004: Telindus Oostende
- 2004–2005: Śląsk Wrocław
- 2005–2006: Ventspils
- 2006–2009: ASK Rīga
- 2009–2010: BC Šiauliai
- 2010: VEF Rīga
- 2011: BK SPU Nitra
- 2011–2012: Apollon Limassol
- 2012: BC Šiauliai
- 2012: Rakvere Tarvas
- 2012–2014: Valga/Maks&Moorits
- 2016: VEF skola

Career highlights
- FIBA EuroStar (2007); Baltic League All-Star (2007); Polish Cup winner (2005); 4× Latvian League champion (1998, 1999, 2006, 2007); Latvian League All-Star (2009); 2× First-team All-MCC (2001, 2002); MCC All-Newcomer Team (2000)

Raitis Grafs (born June 12, 1981) is a Latvian former professional basketball player. He played at the center position. Grafs represented the senior men's Latvian national team. He was a FIBA EuroStar in 2007.

== Early life and career ==
Grafs was born in Riga, Latvia. In kindergarten, Grafs met Kristaps Valters, and they eventually became best friends, and also eventually became teammates. As a teenager, Grafs was regarded as one of the best young basketball prospects in Europe.

== College career ==
Grafs played college basketball in the NCAA DI at Valparaiso University, where he played with the Valparaiso Crusaders, from 1999 to 2003. During his freshman year at Valparaiso, he was nominated the conferences' Newcomer of the Year.

== Professional career ==
After he finished playing college basketball in the US, Grafs returned to Europe. He eventually went on to play in Belgium, Poland, Lithuania, Slovakia, Estonia, Cyprus, and Latvia.

== National team career ==
=== Latvian junior national team ===
Grafs averaged 13.8 points and 10.5 rebounds per game, at the 1998 FIBA Europe Under-18 Championship. At the 1999 FIBA Under-19 World Cup, he averaged 11.9 points per game and 11.0 rebounds per game, and he was voted to the All-Tournament Team.

=== Latvian senior national team ===
Grafs was also a member of the senior Latvian national team. At the age of just 16 years and 5 months, Grafs became the youngest member of the senior men's Latvian national team. With Latvia, he played at the 2001 EuroBasket, the 2003 EuroBasket, the 2005 EuroBasket, and the 2007 EuroBasket.
