= Tatjana Ilić =

Serbian artist (born 1966)

Tatjana Ilic – Tanja Ilic (born Belgrade, December 1966) is a fine artist. She graduated from the Faculty of Fine Arts – Majoring in graphics in Belgrade in 1995. During her studies she enrolled at the Düsseldorf Arts Academy (Kunstakademie – Düsseldorf) in the class of Jannis Kounellis, section Bildhauerei. On the recommendation of her professor, she acquired a Master's status in 1997, and continued to work in the same class until 2000. She has been a member of the Association of Fine Artists of Serbia since 1995. She has also been a member of the International Artists Forum since 2003. In the same year her artwork "Vogel" was incorporated into the analytical review "Performance – Art – Kontext".

Ilić was one of the founders of the artists association Faust – Manifest, established in 2004 in Belgrade. She is the creator of the art project "Frequences" as well as the author of several published articles that explore the relationships between art, systems of art and society in general.

== Art ==
Tatjana Ilic belongs to a small group of Serbian artists who have developed and shaped their work throughout the 1990s and 2000s in Belgrade. Tatjana Ilic studied under professor Jannis Kounellis, the prominent Art Prover artist.

== Selected exhibitions ==
- 1995 Duselldorf, Rundgang, / Black Box/, Germany
- 1995 Belgrade, Student Cultural Center, SKC /"Turbine for Tears"/ Serbia
- 1996 Köln, Lichtenstrasse / Thomas Brinkmann, /|"Performance with identical twins"/, Germany
- 1996 Bonn, Kuenslerforum Bonn, exhibition Field/ De javu/, Germany
- 1997 Fabriano, exhibition "Contemporaneo, Museum Pinacoteca Malioli di Fabriano" / "Tears"/, Italy
- 1997 Belgrade, Modern Art Museum Gallery, Belgrade, Kounellis` class exhibition=T0/ Serbia
- 1997 Thessaloniki, European City of Culture 1997, Greece Geni Zami, / Action Walnut 21/, Greece
- 1999 Düsseldorf, Kunstraum Düsseldorf, "Kounellis klasse" /"Ohne Titel"/, Germany
- 1999 Rome, Roma 1999, Biennale dei Giovani Artisti dell Europa e dei Mediteraneo, / "Vogel"/, Italy
- 2001 Belgrade, Student Cultural Center, Omnibus/ Traveling Studio/ Serbia
- 2001 Trevi, Flash Art Museum Contemporary Art, Artisti Suonati/ "Bravour aria"/, Italy
- 2003 Belgrade, History Museum of Yugoslavia, IKG exhibition "Re-Discovered"/ Performance Ararat, Serbia
- 2003 Essen, EPI Centrum (European Performance Institute) / performance "Die rossige Zeiten"/, Germany
- 2004 Lodge and Nieborow, IKG congress and exhibition, presentation of the art association Faust Manifest, Poland
- 2004 Belgrade, Museum of Contemporary Art, 10 Years of Concordia/ "The Flight" 1998-/, Serbia
- 2005 Tallinn, IKG exhibition, "Ohne grenzen – Without Borders – Pirideta" Museum of Architecture, Tallinn, Estonia
- 2005 Florence, Firenze Galleria dell Academia, exhibition "Forme a venire" – Forme a venire Premio David di Michelangelo/ "Aria for David"/, Italy
- 2006 Belgrade, Museum of Nikola Tesla, project of Marica Perisic "I shall Illuminate the Dark Side of the Moon/ Pigeon and Urn of Nikola Tesla"/, Serbia
- 2007 Belgrade, Graphics Collective Gallery/ "I Carry a Bird for the Work of Art"/, Serbia
- 2007 Belgrade, authorial project "Frequencies"/Ilija Šoškić frequences Tatjana Ilić/ Belgrade Fortress Gallery, Serbia
- 2008 Düsseldorf Malkasten, Kunstfilmtag / film "Vogel" / Germany
- 2008 Belgrade, Museum of Nikola Tesla, Museums Night/Aria for Nikola Tesla/ Serbia
- 2008 Belgrade, ULUS Gallery, exhibition "READY MADE RE – MADE" / "I Carry a Bird for the Work of Art"/ Serbia

== Bibliography (choice) ==
- Salon de Printemps 96: Letzeburger Artisten Centar, 1996, Luxembourg; strana 54
- This is the Student Cultural Center, Belgrade, 1996, Yugoslavia, 85
- Kunstakademie Düsseldorf; Hochschulle der Kunste Thessaloniki; workshop von Jannis Kounellis/ ( text- Katerina Koskika, Jannis Kounellis) Futura, 2000, 60, 61
- Volume: Contemporaneo, – Pinacoteca Cvica di Fabriano 1997, 3, 55- 60
- The Exhibition of students of the Jannis Kunellis`s class, (Text Jannis Kounellis/ Jerk Denegri) Museum of Modern Art, Belgrade, 2, 31
- Keplerstr. 6 – Düsseldorf.- Christel Blomeke, Harald Hofmann, 1998, 21, 22
- Arti visive / Arts visuels,- Roma, 1999, Biennale dei Giovani Artisti dell Europa e dei Mediteraneo; Castelvecchi Arte, 3,36
- Hochschule der Künste Thessaloniki; Workshop unter der anleitung von Jannis Kounellis,1997, 60,61
- Arte della Pace: "Arte della Gerra" organizato presso L Universita La Sapienza di Roma/ a cura di Dragica Šoškić; Le Macchine Celibi, 1999
- Omnibus: SKC Gallery, 2002, 15, 18,24
- The codes of time: 5th International Biennale of Youth, Vrsac 2002, 154
- Artcontext 4: Center for Contemporary Art "Concordia" – Vrsac, 2003, 12, 13, 14
- Artcontext 3: Interview with Tatjana llić – Center for Contemporary Art "Concordia" – Vrsac, April 2002, 11
- Magazine "Likovni Zivot": Belgrade Review, Re- discover (text by Dorotea Baurle Wilert), 2003, Museum of Yugoslavian History
- Hicetnunc: Rasegna di Arte Contemporanea: (text Dragica Čakic "Rosige Zeiten") Edicioni biblioteca dell immagine, Comune di San Vito al Tagliamento, 82, 83
- Performance – Art – Kontext, Performative Ansatze in Kunst und Wissenschaft am Beispiel der "performance art", 2003
- Ten Years of Concordia: Exhibit Practice as a Cultural and Political Strategy (1994–2004), Center for Contemporary Art "Concordia", Vrsac, Serbia, 2004, 183
- Varagic, Sladjana/Radosavljevic, Darka/ Simovic, Ljubisa, "Idea – non – realization", Pozega City Library, 2003, 32 – 33
- Meister, Helge, "Das Blut der Rosen", Dr. Helga Meister/ Stifting Schloos Benradth, 19-26
- Kounellis, Janis/Denegri, Jergo, "Tatjana Ilic", Dom Omladine, Belgrade, 2004, 1-24
- Teatar Infant, Novi Sad, 2005, 16
- Stehend – Gehend, Museum of Modern Visual Art, Novi Sad, 2005, 1-8
- Forme a venire: Premio David di Michelangelo, Bruno Cora, Gli Ori, Prato, 2005, 19, 31, 53
- "Faust – Manifest"/ "Urn and the White Pigeon", I Shall Illuminate the Dark Side of the Moon/ idea/concept Marica Radojcic, Museum of Nikola Tesla, 2006, 88, 89
- Kurschners Handbuch der Bildenen Kunstler, Saur, Munchen/Leipzig, 2006, 505
- "Tatjana Ilic verse Ilija Soskic", Magazine Art Fama, Belgrade, 2007
- Ilija Soskic frequencies Tatjana Ilic, Belgrade Fortress, Belgrade, 2007, 2
- I Carry a Bird for the Work of Art, Graphics Collective Gallery, Belgrade, 2007, 1-4
- Kunstfilmtag – Malkasten, Düsseldorf, 3-13
- Ready – Re – Made, ULUS Gallery, Belgrade, 2008
- Shadow Museum, Museum of Modern Art, Novi Sad, 2008
- Aria for Nikola Tesla, Museums Night, 2008, 1-4
