= Amir Fanan =

Egyptian basketball player

Amir Fanan (born October 28, 1980) is an Egyptian basketball player currently playing for El-Ittihad El-Iskandary of the Egyptian Super League. He is a member of the Egypt national basketball team.

Fanan participated with the Egypt national basketball team at the 2007 and 2009 FIBA Africa Championship. Fanan averaged 13.6 points per game and was the leading scorer on the 2009 Egypt team that finished a disappointing tenth place; this was Egypt's worst ever finish in 19 appearances at the tournament and had some fans calling for a complete dismantling of the team. He also competed for Egypt at the 2001 World Championship for Young Men and the 1999 World Championship for Junior Men.
