= Mo Ke =

Chinese basketball player

Personal information
- Born: September 8, 1982 (age 44) Changchun, Jilin, China
- Listed height: 6 ft 10 3/4 in (2.10 m)
- Listed weight: 230 lb (104 kg)

Career information
- NBA draft: 2004: undrafted
- Position: Center

Career history

Playing
- 2000–2001: Shenbu Lions
- 2001–2014: Bayi Rockets

Coaching
- 2019–2022: Sichuan Blue Whales (assistant)
- 2022–2023: Sichuan Blue Whales
Medals
Men's basketball
Representing China
FIBA Asia Cup
Gold medal – first place	2005 Doha	Team
Asian Games
Gold medal – first place	2006 Doha	Team
Universiade Games
Silver medal – second place	2001 Beijing
FIBA Under-18 Asia Cup
Bronze medal – third place	2000 Kuala Lumpur	Team

Mo Ke (Chinese: 莫科; pinyin: Mò Kē, born September 8, 1982, in Changchun, Jilin) is a former basketball player who played center for the Bayi Rockets of the Chinese Basketball Association (CBA).

He entered the 2004 NBA draft, but went undrafted. No NBA teams showed interest in him since then, and he continued to play for the Bayi Rockets until 2014.

== Personal ==
On September 9, 2009, Mo married basketball player Wang Fan (王凡), who played for Bayi China Telecom in the WCBA.

On January 24, 2010, Mo's wife collapsed during her team's practice. She was sent to No. 309 Hospital of Beijing for treatment after diagnosis of her condition as a pulmonary embolism. After her collapse, Wang never regained consciousness and she died on February 15, 2010. She was only 24 years old; the couple were married only for five months.

Mo married swimmer Zhou Yafei in 2012.
