= Ivan Ilić (footballer, born 1971) =

Serbian footballer

Personal information
- Full name: Ivan Ilić
- Date of birth: 14 February 1971 (age 55)
- Place of birth: SR Serbia, SFR Yugoslavia
- Height: 1.90 m (6 ft 3 in)
- Position: Defender

Senior career*
Years	Team	Apps	(Gls)
1990–1995	Radnički Niš	67+	(4+)
1996	Vojvodina	24	(1)
1996–1998	Royal Antwerp	39	(0)
1998–2000	Radnički Niš	46	(7)
2000–2001	Sartid Smederevo	12	(1)
Total		188+	(13+)

International career
2001	FR Yugoslavia	4	(0)
- * Club domestic league appearances and goals

Ivan Ilić (Serbian Cyrillic: Иван Илић; born 14 February 1971) is a Serbian former footballer who played as a defender and made four appearances for the FR Yugoslavia national team.

== Career ==
Ilić made his international debut for FR Yugoslavia on 16 January 2001 in the Millennium Super Soccer Cup against Bangladesh, which finished as a 4–1 win. He made four appearances in total, his last on 25 January 2001 in the final of the Millennium Super Soccer Cup against Bosnia and Herzegovina, which finished as a 2–0 win.

== Career statistics ==
=== International ===
FR Yugoslavia
Year	Apps	Goals
2001	4	0
Total	4	0
