= Aleksandar Ilić (politician) =

Aleksandar Ilić (1945 – 2018) was a professor of literature at the University of Belgrade. He was appointed the Ambassador of Serbia and Montenegro in the Czech Republic between 2001 and 2005. Eisenhower Fellowships selected Aleksandar Ilic in 1979 to represent Yugoslavia.

In December 1989 he became an active member of the Founding Committee of the Democratic Party. The Democratic Party was the first opposition, non-communist party in Serbia. In 1990 he was the first editor of the newspaper Demokratija, the first opposition newspaper in Serbia.

Professor Ilić died on 24 February 2018 in Belgrade.
