= Raimonds Vaikulis =

Latvian basketball player

Personal information
- Born: February 4, 1980 (age 46) Preiļi, Latvia
- Listed height: 6 ft 3 in (1.91 m)
- Listed weight: 200 lb (91 kg)

Career information
- Playing career: 1998–2013
- Position: Shooting guard

Career history
- 1998–2001: Skonto
- 2001–2002: Dynamo Moscow
- 2002–2004: PBC Ural Great
- 2004–2005: Mons-Hainaut
- 2005–2007: BK Ventspils
- 2007–2008: BK Barons/O!Karte
- 2008–2009: BK Liepājas lauvas
- 2009–2010: MBC Mykolaiv
- 2010–2011: BK Liepājas lauvas
- 2011: BC Rakvere Tarvas
- 2011–2012: BK Jūrmala
- 2013: BK Gulbenes Buki

Career highlights
- Russian Cup (2004); FIBA EuroCup (2008)

Raimonds Vaikulis (born February 4, 1980, in Preili) is a Latvian former professional basketball player.

== Professional career ==
In 2008, with the BK Barons, he won the EuroCup and the Latvian Basketball League championship. He is a member of the Latvian national basketball team.

== Honours ==
- 2003–04 Russian Cup (Ural Great)
- 2005–06 Latvian League (BK Ventspils)
- 2007–08 Latvian League (Barons LMT)
- 2007–08 FIBA EuroCup (Barons LMT)
