= Marija D. Ilić =

Serbian-American electrical engineer

- Born: 1951 (age 74–75)

Academic background
- Education: University of Belgrade
- Alma mater: Washington University in St. Louis

Academic work
- Discipline: Electrical engineering
- Institutions: Massachusetts Institute of Technology; Carnegie Mellon University; New Electricity Transmission Software; University of Illinois at Urbana–Champaign; Cornell University

Marija D. Ilić (born 1951) is a Serbian-American electrical engineer known for her work on the control and pricing of large electrical power systems. She is a professor emerita of electrical and computer engineering at Carnegie Mellon University, a senior research scientist at the Laboratory for Information & Decision Systems at the Massachusetts Institute of Technology, a senior staff member at the MIT Lincoln Laboratory, and the founding chief scientist of New Electricity Transmission Software in Massachusetts.

== Education and career ==
Ilić earned an engineering diploma in 1974, and a master's degree in electrical engineering in 1977, both from the University of Belgrade. She came to the US for doctoral study in systems science and mathematics at Washington University in St. Louis, and completed a D.Sc. there in 1980.

She became an assistant professor at Cornell University in 1982, and in 1984 moved to the University of Illinois at Urbana–Champaign as a tenured associate professor, a position she kept until 1989. In 1987 she began her association with the Massachusetts Institute of Technology as a senior research scientist. In 2002 she founded New Electricity Transmission Software and moved to Carnegie Mellon University as a full professor. She retired from Carnegie Mellon in 2016 and returned to MIT as a visiting professor, senior scientist, and staff member at the Lincoln Laboratory.

Although Ilić left Belgrade while it was still part of Yugoslavia, she is listed as Serbian by Academia Europaea.

== Books ==
Ilić is the coauthor of books including:

- Hierarchical Power Systems Control: Its Value in a Changing Industry (with Shell Liu, Springer, 1996)
- Price-Based Commitment Decisions in the Electricity Market (with Eric Allen, Springer, 1999)
- Dynamics and Control of Large Electric Power Systems (with John Zaborszky, Wiley, 2000)
- Valuation, Hedging and Speculation in Competitive Electricity Markets: A Fundamental Approach (with Petter L. Skantze, Springer, 2001)

== Recognition ==
Ilić is a Fellow of the IEEE, elected in the 1999 class of fellows "for contributions to hierarchical electric power systems control and applications". In 2020 she was elected as a member of the Academia Europaea. In 2021, Ilić was elected a member of the National Academy of Engineering for contributions to electric power system analysis and control. She is also a Fellow of the International Federation of Automatic Control.

She holds an honorary chaired professorship at the Delft University of Technology.
