= Hashim Zaidan =

Qatari basketball player (born 1980)

Medal record

Men's basketball

Representing Qatar

Asian Games
Silver medal – second place	2006 Doha	Team

Hashim Zaidan Zaidan (Arabic: هاشم زيدان زيدان) (born August 13, 1980) is a Qatari professional basketball player.

== Career ==
A 6'10" center, Zaidan plays professionally for the Doha-based Al-Ahli Sports Club. He participated in the 2006 FIBA World Championship as a member of the Qatar national basketball team, and he recently won a silver medal at the 2006 Asian Games.
