= Ivan Ilić (volleyball) =

Serbian volleyball player

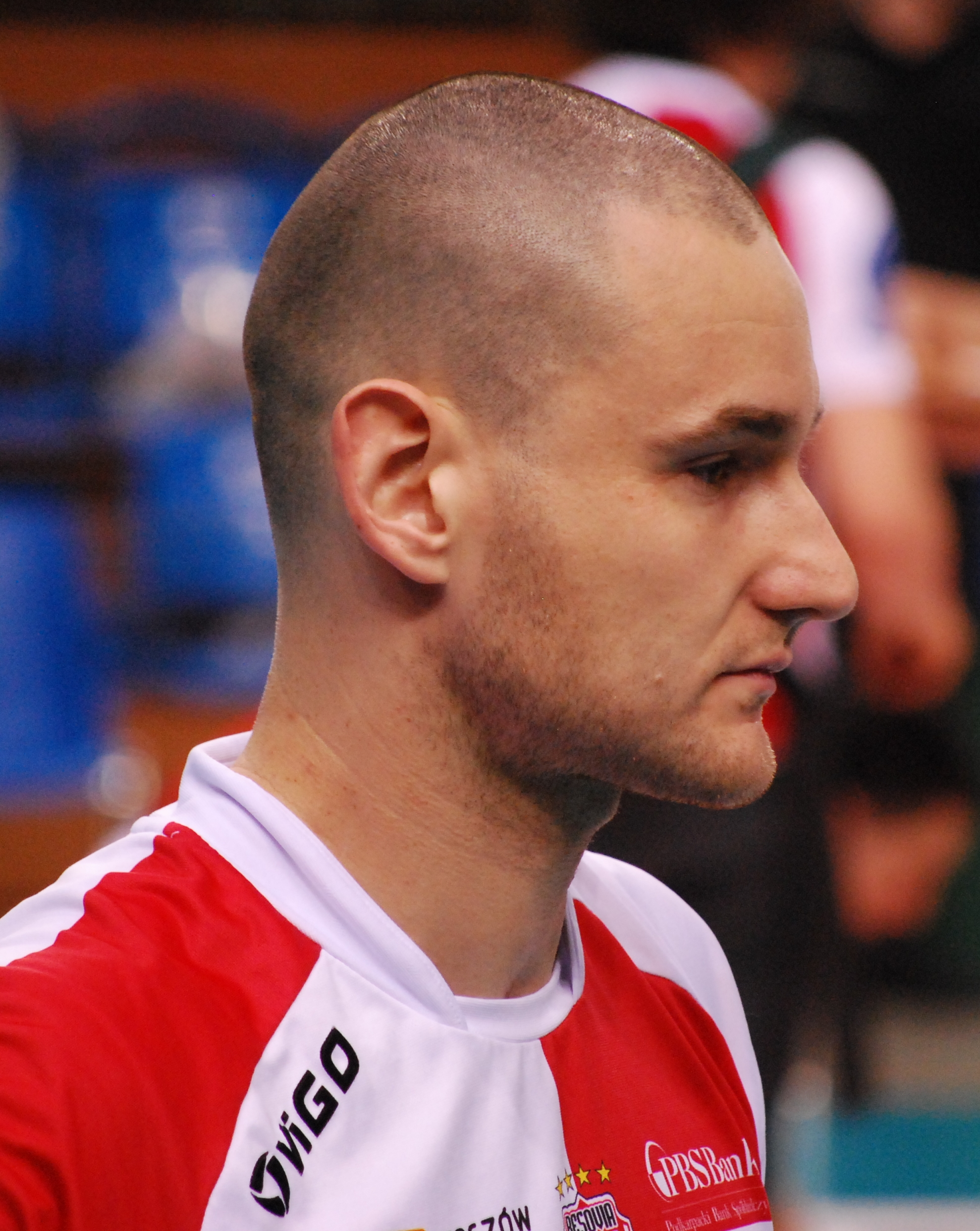
- Ilić in 2010

Personal information
- Born: 19 December 1976 (age 49); Titovo Užice, SR Serbia, Yugoslavia
- Height: 1.94 m (6 ft 4 in)
- Weight: 85 kg (187 lb)
- Spike: 337 cm (133 in)
- Block: 318 cm (125 in)

National team
| Serbia |
Honours
Men's volleyball
Representing Serbia and Montenegro
European Championship
| Bronze medal – third place | 2005 Serbia/Italy | Team |
World Cup
| Bronze medal – third place | 2003 Japan | Team |
World League
| Silver medal – second place | 2005 Belgrade | Team |
| Bronze medal – third place | 2004 Rome | Team |

Ivan Ilić (Serbian: Иван Илић born 19 December 1976, in Titovo Užice, SR Serbia, Yugoslavia) is a Serbian volleyball player. He was a member of the national team representing Serbia and Montenegro at the 2004 Summer Olympics in Athens.
