= Mario Stojić =

Croatian basketball player

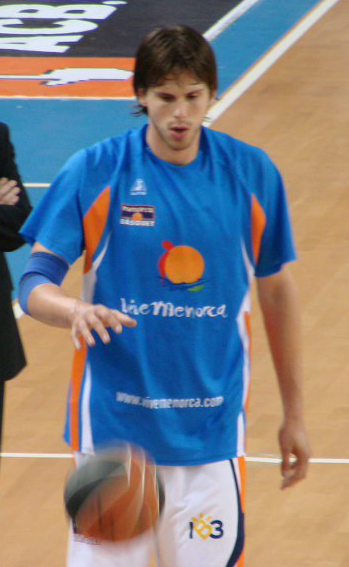

Personal information
- Born: May 6, 1980 (age 46) Mannheim, West Germany
- Listed height: 6 ft 6 in (1.98 m)
- Listed weight: 220 lb (100 kg)

Career information
- Playing career: 1996–2014
- Position: Small forward / shooting guard

Career history
- 1996–1997: Sava Osiguranje
- 1997–2000: Zagreb
- 2001–2002: Benetton Treviso
- 2002–2003: Lucentum Alicante
- 2003–2005: Real Madrid
- 2006–2009: Menorca
- 2009–2012: Lucentum Alicante
- 2012–2013: Telenet Oostende
- 2013–2014: MHP Riesen Ludwigsburg

Career highlights
- Italian League champion (2002); Spanish League champion (2005)
Medals
Men's basketball
Representing Croatia
World U-19 Championship
Bronze medal – third place	1999 Portugal	U-19 Team
World U-21 Championship
Silver medal – second place	2001 Japan	U-21 Team
European U-18 Championship
Silver medal – second place	1998 Bulgaria	U-18 Team

Mario Stojić (born May 6, 1980 in Mannheim) is a retired Croatian professional basketball player. He had played both the small forward and shooting guard positions for top division clubs in Croatia, Italy, Belgium, Germany and, most of his career, Spain.

== Career statistics ==
Correct as of 23 June 2007

Season	Team	League	GP	MPG	RPG	APG	PPG
2002-03	Alicante	ACB	27	24	2.1	1.6	8
2003-04	R. Madrid	ACB	33	24	2.5	1	5.4
2004-05	R. Madrid	ACB	26	10	0.9	0.3	2.4
2005-06	Menorca	ACB	34	26	2.3	1.5	10.6
2006-07	Menorca	ACB	34	26	2.7	2.2	10.6

Playoffs	Team	League	GP	MPG	RPG	APG	PPG
2002-03	Alicante	ACB	3	31	1.7	3	5.3
2003-04	R. Madrid	ACB	4	27	2.7	0.7	6.7
