= Paulo Cunha (basketball) =

Portuguese basketball player (born 1980)

Personal information
- Born: 1 August 1980 (age 46) Vila Nova de Gaia
- Listed height: 6 ft 6.6 in (2.00 m)
- Listed weight: 203 lb (92 kg)

Career information
- Playing career: 1998–2018
- Position: Power forward

Career history
- 1998–1999: Salesianos
- 1999–2010: FC Porto
- 2010–2018: Vitória Guimarães

Career highlights
- Portuguese League champion (2004); 6× Portuguese Cup winner (2000, 2004, 2006, 2007, 2010, 2013); 5× Portuguese League Cup winner (2000, 2002, 2004, 2008, 2010); 2× Portuguese Super Cup winner (1999, 2004); Portuguese Champions Tournament winner (2006)

Paulo César da Costa Cunha (born 1 August 1980, Vila Nova de Gaia) is a former Portuguese basketball player.
