= Guido Grünheid =

German basketball player (born 1982)

Personal information
- Born: 25 October 1982 (age 44) Jena, East Germany
- Listed height: 6 ft 10 in (2.08 m)
- Listed weight: 251 lb (114 kg)

Career information
- NBA draft: 2004: undrafted
- Playing career: 1997–2016
- Position: Power forward / small forward
- Number: 12, 13, 25, 31

Career history
- 1997–2000: TuS Jena
- 2000–2002: TuS Lichterfelde
- 2002–2005: Alba Berlin
- 2005–2007: RheinEnergie Köln
- 2007–2008: Hanzevast Capitals
- 2008: Köln 99ers
- 2008–2009: Aigaleo Athens
- 2009–2011: Mitteldeutscher
- 2011–2015: Artland Dragons
- 2015–2016: Science City Jena

Career highlights
- 4× German League champion (2001–03, 2006); 3× German Cup winner (2002, 2003, 2007); Dutch League Steals Leader (2008)

Guido Grünheid (born 25 October 1982) is a German former professional basketball player.

== Professional career ==
During his pro career, Grünheid played with several German League clubs. He also played in the Greek League, with Aigaleo, and in the Dutch League with Hanzevast Capitals.

== National team career ==
Grünheid was also a member of the senior German national team. With Germany, he played at the 2006 FIBA World Cup and the 2007 EuroBasket.
