= Chinese Basketball Association scoring leaders =

The Chinese Basketball Association scoring leaders are the season by season individual scoring leaders of the Chinese Basketball Association (CBA). These records only record after the CBA was established in 1995.

== CBA scoring leaders ==
Season	Top Scorer	Team	PPG
1995–96	(China) Hu Weidong	Jiangsu Dragons	28.0
1996–97	(China) Hu Weidong (×2)	Jiangsu Dragons	32.0
1997–98	(China) Gong Xiaobin	Shandong Flaming Bulls	32.6
1998–99	(China) Sun Jun	Jilin Northeast Tigers	31.8
1999–00	(China) Hu Weidong (×3)	Jiangsu Dragons	32.6
2000–01	(China) Sun Jun (×2)	Jilin Northeast Tigers	33.8
2001–02	(China) Liu Yudong	Bayi Rockets	37.0
2002–03	(China) Sun Jun (×3)	Jilin Northeast Tigers	33.0
2003–04	(United States) God Shammgod	Zhejiang Cyclones	27.1
2004–05	(China) Zhu Fangyu	Guangdong Southern Tigers	25.8
2005–06	(United States) Anthony Myles	Dongguan Leopards	32.3
2006–07	(United States) Anthony Myles (×2)	Dongguan Leopards	32.1
2007–08	(United States) Dontae' Jones	Yunnan Bulls	32.3
2008–09	(United States) Rodney White	Zhejiang Guangsha Lions	36.6
2009–10	(United States) Andre Emmett	Shandong Gold Lions	32.0
2010–11	(United States) Charles Gaines	Qingdao Eagles	33.0
2011–12	(United States) J. R. Smith	Zhejiang Golden Bulls	34.4
2012–13	(United States) Shavlik Randolph	Foshan Dralions	32.5
2013–14	(United States) Jonathan Gibson	Zhejiang Guangsha Lions	32.5
2014–15	(United States) Errick McCollum	Zhejiang Golden Bulls	39.6
2015–16	(United States) Jonathan Gibson (×2)	Qingdao Eagles	42.0
2016–17	(United States) Errick McCollum (×2)	Beijing Beikong Fly Dragons	37.5
2017–18	(United States) / (Bulgaria) Darius Adams	Xinjiang Flying Tigers	40.1
2018–19	(United States) Pierre Jackson	Beikong Fly Dragons	39.8
2019–20	(United States) Joseph Young	Shanghai Sharks	38.3
2020–21	(United States) Trae Golden	Fujian Sturgeons	30.4
2021–22	(United States) Trae Golden (×2)	Fujian Sturgeons	44.7
2022–23	(United States) Antonio Blakeney	Jiangsu Dragons	32.7
2023–24	(United States) Trae Golden (×3)	Sichuan Blue Whales	33.3
2024–25	(United States) Edmond Sumner	Sichuan Blue Whales	36.0
2025–26	(United States) Terquavion Smith	Shenzhen Leopards	24.4

== Players with most top-scorer awards ==
Player	Awards	Editions
(China) Hu Weidong	3	1996, 1997, 2000
(China) Sun Jun	3	1999, 2001, 2003
(United States) Trae Golden	3	2021, 2022, 2024
(United States) Anthony Myles	2	2006, 2007
(United States) Jonathan Gibson	2	2014, 2016
(United States) Errick McCollum	2	2015, 2017

== See also ==
- CBA Most Valuable Player
- CBA Finals Most Valuable Player
