= Liu Wei (basketball) =

Chinese basketball player

Liu Wei 刘炜
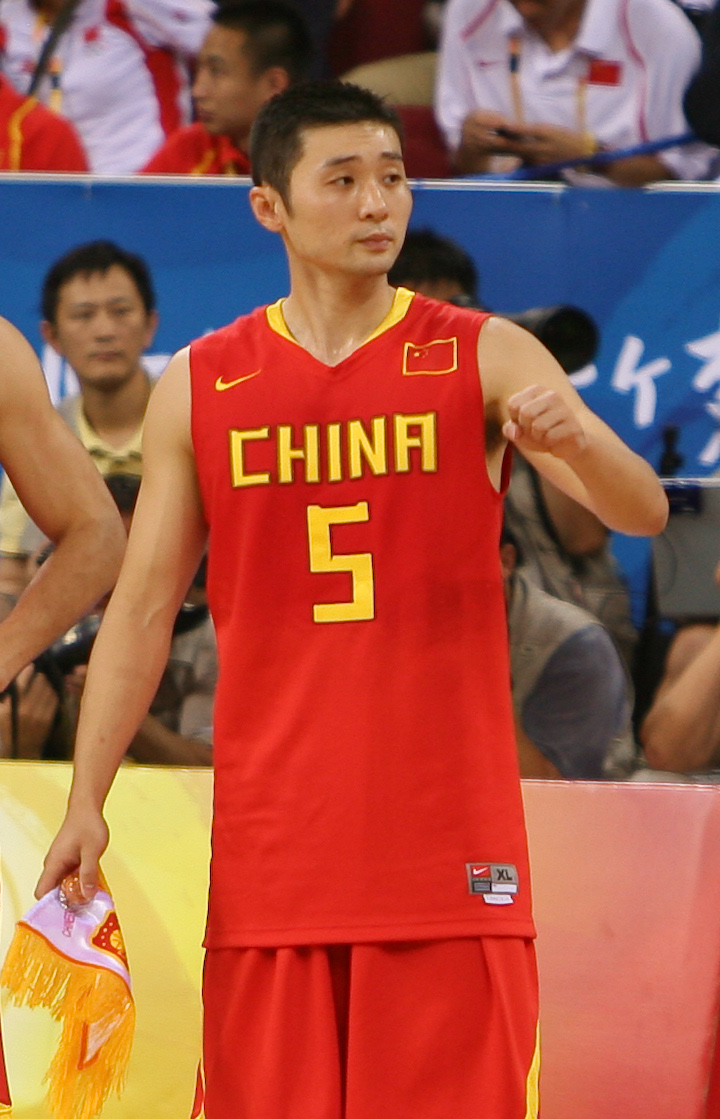

Personal information
- Born: 15 January 1980 (age 46) Shanghai, China
- Listed height: 6 ft 2 in (1.88 m)
- Listed weight: 200 lb (91 kg)

Career information
- Playing career: 1997–2019
- Position: Point guard

Career history

Playing
- 1997–2014: Shanghai Sharks
- 2014–2016: Xinjiang Flying Tigers
- 2016–2018: Sichuan Blue Whales
- 2018–2019: Shanghai Sharks

Coaching
- 2020: Shanghai Sharks
- 2020: Shanghai Sharks (interim)
- 2020–2021: Shanghai Sharks
- 2021–2022: Shanghai Sharks U19
- 2023: China (assistant)
- 2024: Ningbo Rockets
- 2024–2026: Xinjiang Flying Tigers

Career highlights
- No. 8 retired by Shanghai Sharks
Medals
Men's basketball
Representing China
FIBA Asia Cup
Silver medal – second place	2009 Tianjin
Gold medal – first place	2011 Wuhan
Gold medal – first place	2015 Changsha
Asian Games
Silver medal – second place	2002 Busan
Gold medal – first place	2006 Doha
Gold medal – first place	2010 Guangzhou

Liu Wei (Chinese: 刘炜; pinyin: Liú Wěi) is a Chinese basketball coach and former basketball player who played as a point guard.

== CBA career ==
Liu Wei played alongside his close friend Yao Ming for ten years on several youth teams and with the Shanghai Sharks before Yao went on to play in the National Basketball Association with the Houston Rockets. Prior to the 2004-05 season, the Sacramento Kings signed Liu to their preseason roster. Liu was released by Sacramento at the end of training camp after playing in three games and averaging two points per game and four rebounds per game. Liu then returned to China to play for the Shanghai Sharks, carving out a career as one of the best ever players in the Chinese Basketball Association. After seventeen seasons playing for Shanghai, Liu decided to sign with the Xinjiang Flying Tigers.

== National team career ==
Liu was a key member of the Chinese national basketball team that participated in the 2002 FIBA World Championship, the 2006 FIBA World Championship, and the 2010 FIBA World Championship. He was also selected to play on the Chinese national squads that competed at the 2004 Summer Olympics, the 2008 Summer Olympics and the 2012 Summer Olympics. In addition, Liu has also taken part in numerous FIBA Asia Cup competitions.

== Career statistics ==
=== CBA statistics ===
Year	Team	GP	RPG	APG	FG%	3PT%	FT%	PPG
1997–98	Shanghai	18	1.8	1.5	.427	.144	.611	4.3
1998–99	Shanghai	23	4.6	1.3	.493	.362	.727	11.2
1999–00	Shanghai	31	3.6	2.2	.363	.243	.651	7.4
2000–01	Shanghai	32	3.9	1.6	.460	.317	.682	11.5
2001–02	Shanghai	34	4.9	3.6	.540	.408	.806	15.9
2002–03	Shanghai	26	6.7	5.3	.508	.452	.868	23.9
2003–04	Shanghai	27	5.9	4.7	.465	.359	.832	18.8
2004–05	Shanghai	36	6.2	5.9	.442	.316	.832	18.6
2005–06	Shanghai	40	4.9	5.6	.450	.344	.875	22.4
2006–07	Shanghai	33	5.6	4.8	.487	.370	.877	18.0
2007–08	Shanghai	25	5.0	6.9	.461	.339	.752	18.4
2008–09	Shanghai	27	4.8	6.6	.407	.324	.833	15.6
2009–10	Shanghai	35	5.1	4.9	.413	.318	.827	21.3
2010–11	Shanghai	25	3.6	5.1	.403	.322	.784	18.6
2011–12	Shanghai	30	3.5	3.8	.358	.309	.792	12.9
2012–13	Shanghai	21	4.5	4.5	.463	.361	.795	21.3
2013–14	Shanghai	34	5.6	3.7	.386	.314	.898	14.8
2014–15	Xinjiang	34	3.6	3.2	.507	.341	.791	12.9
Career		529	4.7	5.0	.446	.340	.791	15.9
