= CBA Finals Most Valuable Player =

The Chinese Basketball Association (CBA) Finals MVP is the annual award that is handed out at the end of each Chinese Basketball Association (CBA) playoff finals series to the most valuable player of that season's CBA Finals. The award was first distributed at the end of the 2003–04 season and Du Feng was the first winner. Before that, the award was named the Chinese Basketball Association (CBA) League MVP. From that year until the 2011–12 season, international players (non Chinese/Taiwanese) were not allowed to win the award. Starting with the 2012–13 season, international players became eligible to win the award.

== CBA League MVP winners ==
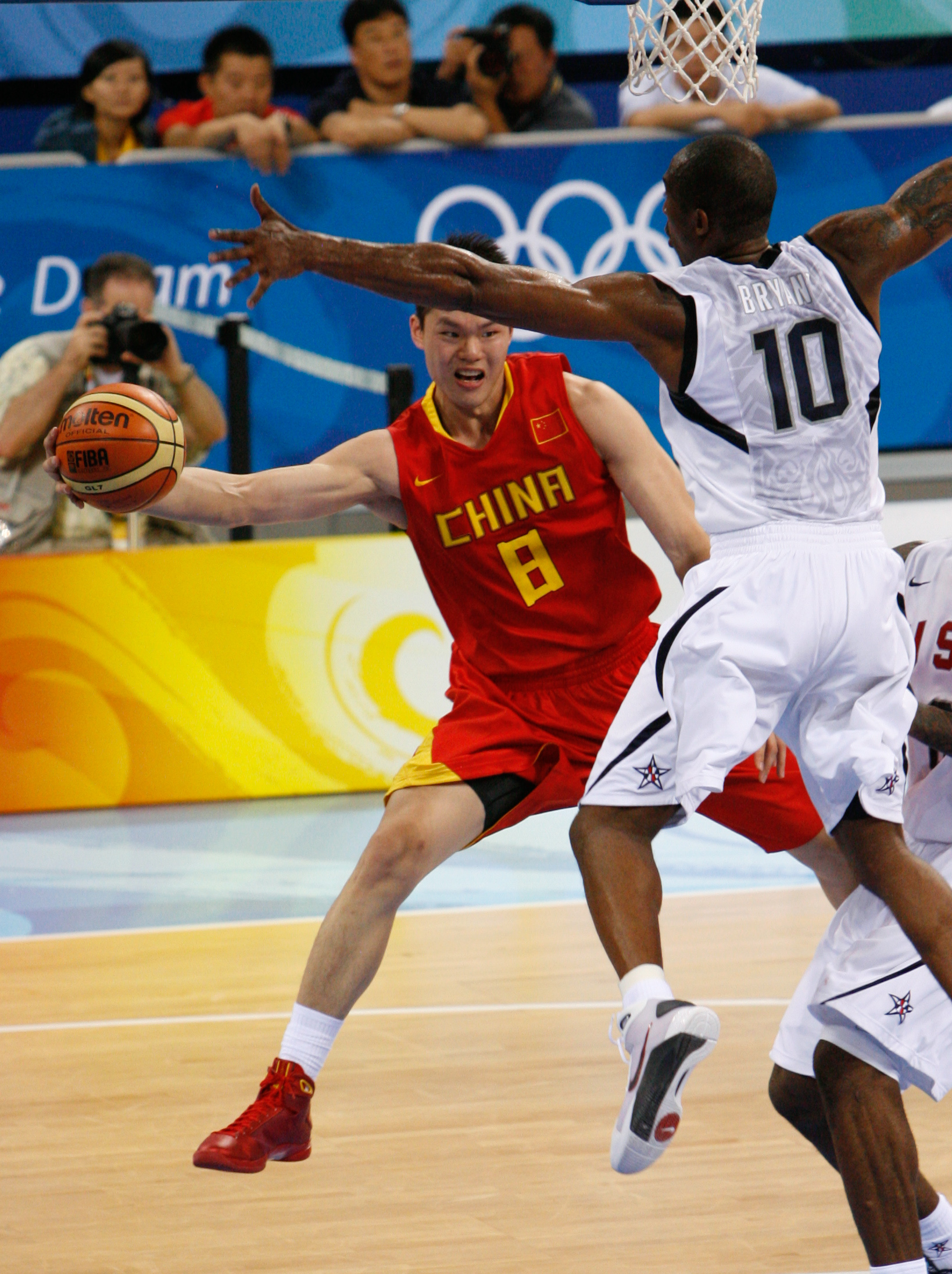
Zhu Fangyu, is a four-time CBA Finals MVP award winner.

CBA League MVP winners
Season	Player	Nationality	Position	Team	Ref(s)
1999–00	Wang Zhizhi	China	PF/C	Bayi Rockets	
2000–01	Yao Ming	China	C	Shanghai Sharks	
2001–02	Liu Yudong	China	PF	Bayi Rockets	
2002–03	Liu Yudong (×2)	China	PF	Bayi Rockets	

== CBA Finals MVP winners ==
CBA Finals MVP winners
Season	Player	Nationality	Position	Team	Ref(s)
2003–04	Du Feng	China	PF/C	Guangdong Southern Tigers	
2004–05	Zhu Fangyu	China	SF	Guangdong Southern Tigers	
2005–06	Yi Jianlian	China	PF/C	Guangdong Southern Tigers	
2006–07	Wang Zhizhi (×2)	China	PF/C	Bayi Rockets	
2007–08	Zhu Fangyu (×2)	China	SF	Guangdong Southern Tigers	
2008–09	Zhu Fangyu (×3)	China	SF	Guangdong Southern Tigers	
2009–10	Zhu Fangyu (×4)	China	SF	Guangdong Southern Tigers	
2010–11	Wang Shipeng	China	SG/SF	Guangdong Southern Tigers	
2011–12	Lee Hsueh-lin	Chinese Taipei	PG	Beijing Ducks	
2012–13	Yi Jianlian (×2)	China	PF/C	Guangdong Southern Tigers	
2013–14	Randolph Morris	United States	C	Beijing Ducks	
2014–15	Stephon Marbury	United States	PG	Beijing Ducks	
2015–16	Hamed Haddadi	Iran	C	Sichuan Blue Whales	
2016–17	Darius Adams	Bulgaria	PG	Xinjiang Flying Tigers	
2017–18	Lester Hudson	United States	PG/SG	Liaoning Flying Leopards	
2018–19	Yi Jianlian (×3)	China	PF/C	Guangdong Southern Tigers	
2019–20	Sonny Weems	United States	SF	Guangdong Southern Tigers	
2020–21	Hu Mingxuan	China	PG	Guangdong Southern Tigers	
2021–22	Zhao Jiwei	China	PG	Liaoning Flying Leopards	
2022–23	Zhao Jiwei (×2)	China	PG	Liaoning Flying Leopards	
2023–24	Kyle Fogg	United States	PG	Liaoning Flying Leopards	
2024–25	Barry Brown Jr.	United States	PG/SG	Zhejiang Lions	
2025–26	Brandon Goodwin	Qatar	PG	Shanghai Sharks	

== See also ==
- CBA Most Valuable Player
- CBA Scoring Champion
