= Wang Zhizhi =

Chinese basketball player (born 1977)

Wang Zhizhi 王治郅
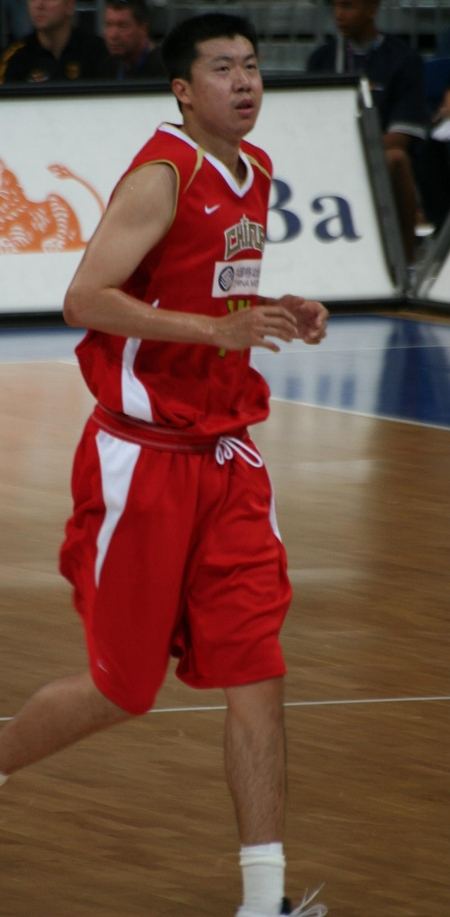

Personal information
- Born: 8 July 1977 (age 49) Beijing, China
- Listed height: 7 ft 1 in (2.16 m)
- Listed weight: 284 lb (129 kg)

Career information
- NBA draft: 1999: 2nd round, 36th overall pick
- Drafted by: Dallas Mavericks
- Playing career: 1995–2015
- Position: Center
- Number: 14, 16, 15
- Coaching career: 2015–present

Career history

Playing
- 1995–2001: Bayi Rockets
- 2001–2002: Dallas Mavericks
- 2002–2003: Los Angeles Clippers
- 2003–2005: Miami Heat
- 2006–2015: Bayi Rockets

Career highlights
- 7× CBA champion (1996–2001, 2007); CBA MVP (2000); 2× CBA Finals MVP (2000, 2007); 4× CBA blocks leader (1996–1999); 2× CBA Slam Dunk leader (1996, 1998)
- Stats at NBA.com
- Stats at Basketball Reference
- FIBA Hall of Fame
Medals
Men's basketball
Representing China
FIBA Asia Cup
Bronze medal – third place	1997 Riyadh
Gold medal – first place	1999 Fukuoka
Silver medal – second place	2009 Tianjin
Gold medal – first place	2011 Wuhan
Asian Games
Gold medal – first place	1998 Bangkok
Gold medal – first place	2006 Doha
Gold medal – first place	2010 Guangzhou
East Asian Games
Gold medal – first place	1993 Shanghai
Silver medal – second place	1997 Busan
Gold medal – first place	2001 Osaka
Universiade Games
Silver medal – second place	2001 Beijing
ABC Under-18 Championship
Silver medal – second place	1995 Manila
Gold medal – first place	1996 Johor Bahru
ABC Under-22 Championship
Silver medal – second place	1996 Shanghai

Wang Zhizhi
- Chinese: 王治郅
Transcriptions
Standard Mandarin
- Hanyu Pinyin: Wáng Zhìzhì
- Wade–Giles: Wang^{2} Chih^{4}-chih^{4}
- IPA: [wǎŋ ʈʂɻ̩̂.ʈʂɻ̩̂]

Wang Zhizhi (Chinese: 王治郅; pinyin: Wáng Zhìzhì, pronounced [uǎŋ ʈʂɻ̩̂ʈʂɻ̩̂]; born 8 July 1977) is a Chinese former professional basketball player who was the head coach of the Bayi Rockets, the team with which he spent his domestic career in the Chinese Basketball Association (CBA). He also played in the National Basketball Association (NBA) for the Dallas Mavericks, Los Angeles Clippers, and Miami Heat, becoming China's first player to compete in the NBA.

== Early and personal life ==
The son of two former basketball players, Wang Zhizhi started playing basketball at the age of 8, and when he was 14 his parents signed him up for the People's Liberation Army, considering the PLA to have the best coaching and facilities in China. He grew up watching weekly NBA game broadcasts on television in Beijing, idolizing Hakeem Olajuwon and Charles Barkley. Although Wang was born in 1977, when processing his travel documents, authorities instead represented his birth year as 1979 so that he could participate longer in youth athletics competitions.

Wang has been married twice. The first marriage was to Song Yang, a real estate agent from Haicheng, Liaoning. They were married from 2000 to 2016 and had a son named Wang Xilin who was born in April 2004 in the United States. He is currently following in his father's footsteps to becoming a professional basketball player. Wang Zhizhi is currently married to Zhou Lei, a television host from Chengdu, Sichuan. They had one private wedding at the end of 2018 followed by a second wedding in May 2019.

== Early CBA career ==
Wang signed his first professional contract with the Bayi Rockets in 1994. When the Chinese Basketball Association staged its first season in 1995–96, Wang was one of the youngest players in the league, but he soon became a starter and key member on the star-studded squad.

From 1995–96 until his departure for the National Basketball Association after the 2000–01 season, he and the import-less Bayi Rockets won the first six CBA championships, but the team's dynasty was upended by Yao Ming and the Shanghai Sharks as soon as Wang left for the NBA.

== NBA career ==
To the surprise of almost all Chinese basketball officials and reporters, the Dallas Mavericks of the National Basketball Association selected Wang with the 36th pick in the second round of the 1999 NBA draft. Dallas' assistant general manager Donnie Nelson had grown an interest in Wang ever since he spotted him in a 1993 game in Russia. Once Wang's agent Xia Song learned about Wang's real date of birth, which made him 22 and automatically eligible for the draft, he contacted Nelson and started arranging for his client to join the NBA. Xia was in Dallas on draft night, and had a proof of Wang's age through his old military identification. Unprepared and confused, the Bayi Rockets refused to allow their only center to leave for the National Basketball Association, at least immediately.

After long periods of negotiations, Wang was finally let go by his team and the Chinese basketball officials to pursue his NBA dream, two years after he was drafted. He became the first ever Chinese player to play in the National Basketball Association. Wang arrived in Dallas after winning his last CBA championship title when there were fewer than ten games left in the 2000–01 season. Despite some adjustment difficulties, Wang managed well by averaging 4.8 points per game and 1.4 rebounds per game, making the team's playoff roster joining superstars Shawn Bradley, Steve Nash, and Dirk Nowitzki. Two days after Dallas were eliminated from the playoffs, Wang hurried back to China to play in the 2001 East Asian Games according to an agreement formed between the Chinese authorities and the Dallas Mavericks. However, Wang still had one obligation to fulfill before being allowed to return to the National Basketball Association. His former club Bayi requested that he stay in China to play in the 2001 National Games in November 2001. Wang returned to Dallas after barely defeating Yao Ming's Shanghai team by one point in the final, but he found that he had a lot of catching up to do as other players already had two months of preparation and training.

Wang's contract with Dallas expired after the 2001–02 season. With his future up in the air, he decided that he would spend the summer in the United States, rather than returning to China for training, as the Dallas Mavericks had promised the Chinese basketball officials. Wang fired his agent Xia Song when the latter suggested otherwise, and following the advice of his American-born Chinese friend Simon Chan, moved to Los Angeles without telling either Dallas or his Chinese side about his intentions. During his stay, Chinese basketball officials faxed two letters to him urging him to return to China as soon as possible to train with the Chinese national basketball team. A major blow to all parties involved was an article by Jodie Valade that appeared in The Dallas Morning News which hinted that Wang, who had not yet stated his intentions, might consider defecting to the United States. China sent two military officials who had known Wang very well to go to the United States for a final negotiation. During a press conference, Wang stressed that the relationship between him and the Chinese was like one between "a son and a mother", and the conflict was all a big misunderstanding. He was ultimately dismissed from the Chinese national team for failing to return to China for practice in 2002.

Wang signed with the Los Angeles Clippers in 2002 and after a season with them, he was placed on waivers. The Miami Heat decided to sign Wang to a multi-year contract after picking him up, teaming him with Shaquille O'Neal and Dwyane Wade. He became a free agent at the end of the 2004–05 season after playing for two seasons with Miami, over which he played 34 games and averaged 2.5 PPG.

== Later CBA career ==
Following the 2004–05 season, Wang returned to China to rejoin Bayi in the Chinese Basketball Association, but would not be activated by the Rockets until the 2006–07 season. The impact of his return was immediate, as in March 2007, he led Bayi to their eighth CBA title. Wang was named CBA Finals MVP for the second time in his career as the Rockets beat the Guangdong Southern Tigers in the championship series.

He announced his retirement at the end of the 2013–14 season, but briefly returned to the court the next year, after Bayi went 0–7 in their first seven games. On July 12, 2016, Wang officially finalized his retirement from professional basketball. He had already become an assistant coach for the Rockets in 2015, and took over as head coach prior to the 2018–19 season.

== National team career ==
Wang became the first ever Chinese player to be invited to play for the international squad against the best American high school players in the prestigious Nike Hoop Summit. He started the game and scored six points and six rebounds. He was then offered a basketball scholarship from John Thompson to play for Georgetown University. Wang was included in the Chinese national basketball team for the 1996 Summer Olympics, where he averaged 11.1 points per game and 5.6 rebounds per game, helping the team to finish as 8th place overall. After leading the Chinese national team to the 1999 FIBA Asia Championship title, Wang again starred for China in the 2000 Summer Olympics, averaging 13.5 points per game and 5.0 rebounds per game.

On 10 April 2006, following weeks of rumors from the Chinese media, Wang returned to China from the National Basketball Association after being expelled from the national team for four years due to conflicts with Chinese officials. He publicly apologized for his past mistakes and stated that he wanted to represent his national team in the 2006 FIBA World Championship as well as the 2008 Summer Olympics. Over a period of four weeks in the lead-up to the 2006 FIBA World Championship, he was a significant contributor to the Chinese national team in the absence of injured Houston Rockets player Yao Ming, scoring 4.3 points per game and 2.6 rebounds per game in eight matches before suffering a torn ligament during an exhibition against France in July 2006. Wang recovered in time to play in the tournament and averaged 8.2 points per game and 3.5 rebounds per game.Wang was inducted into the FIBA Hall of Fame in 2026.

== Career statistics ==
=== CBA statistics ===
Regular season and Playoffs combined

Year	Team	GP	MPG	2P%	3P%	FT%	RPG	APG	SPG	BPG	PPG
1995–96	Bayi	26	N/A	**.647**	.000	.813	6.8	0.3	0.7	**3.4**	14.9
1996–97	Bayi	26	N/A	.554	.000	.825	7.3	1.0	1.3	2.7	16.5
1997–98	Bayi	29	N/A	.590	.391	.678	8.8	0.9	1.0	2.7	21.8
1998–99	Bayi	30	N/A	.581	.216	.773	7.8	0.8	1.2	2.5	25.0
1999–00	Bayi	30	N/A	.557	.373	.832	10.0	0.8	**3.0**	2.6	**27.0**
2000–01	Bayi	31	N/A	.594	.361	.761	**11.7**	1.6	1.7	2.1	26.3
2006–07	Bayi	**39**	N/A	.593	.418	.823	10.2	2.3	1.3	2.1	26.8
2007–08	Bayi	32	N/A	.525	.436	.875	9.0	2.2	1.7	1.8	26.2
2008–09	Bayi	24	N/A	.553	.375	.839	7.6	2.0	0.8	1.5	22.0
2009–10	Bayi	34	N/A	.470	.387	.769	10.2	1.6	1.4	2.1	22.2
2010–11	Bayi	34	N/A	.547	.426	.855	8.7	2.4	1.1	1.4	18.6
2011–12	Bayi	31	28.3	.513	**.506**	.832	6.3	1.8	1.0	0.8	18.1
2012–13	Bayi	32	31.5	.516	.348	**.895**	7.1	1.7	1.1	1.3	20.8
2013–14	Bayi	34	27.9	.505	.360	.887	6.0	1.4	0.8	0.9	16.9
2014–15	Bayi	2	12.7	.529	.200	.833	4.0	**3.0**	0.0	0.0	12.0
**Career**		434	INC	.549	.395	.816	8.4	1.5	1.3	2.0	22.3

=== NBA statistics ===
Legend
GP	Games played	GS	Games started	MPG	Minutes per game
FG%	Field goal percentage	3P%	3-point field goal percentage	FT%	Free throw percentage
RPG	Rebounds per game	APG	Assists per game	SPG	Steals per game
BPG	Blocks per game	PPG	Points per game	**Bold**	Career high

==== Regular season ====
Year	Team	GP	GS	MPG	FG%	3P%	FT%	RPG	APG	SPG	BPG	PPG
2000–01	Dallas	5	0	7.6	.421	.000	.800	1.4	0.0	0.0	0.0	4.8
2001–02	Dallas	**55**	0	**10.9**	.440	.414	.737	**2.0**	**0.4**	**0.2**	0.2	**5.6**
2002–03	L.A. Clippers	41	**1**	10.0	.383	.348	.724	1.9	0.2	**0.2**	0.2	4.4
2003–04	Miami	16	0	7.1	.370	.286	**.900**	1.1	0.1	**0.2**	**0.3**	3.0
2004–05	Miami	19	0	4.8	**.472**	**.667**	.583	1.0	0.3	**0.2**	0.1	2.3
**Career**		136	1	9.2	.417	.387	.735	1.7	0.3	0.2	0.2	4.0

==== Playoffs ====
Year	Team	GP	GS	MPG	FG%	3P%	FT%	RPG	APG	SPG	BPG	PPG
2001	Dallas	5	0	4.6	.375	**.500**	**1.000**	0.4	0.2	**0.2**	**0.2**	2.0
2002	Dallas	**8**	0	**5.5**	**.438**	**.500**	.500	**1.0**	**0.4**	0.0	0.1	**2.5**
2004	Miami	3	0	2.3	.000	.000	.000	0.0	0.3	0.0	0.0	0.0
**Career**		16	0	4.6	.417	.500	.667	0.7	0.3	0.2	0.1	1.9
