= Liu Yudong =

Chinese basketball player

Liu Yudong 刘玉栋
Personal information
- Born: October 23, 1970 (age 56) Putian, Fujian, China
- Listed height: 6 ft 6.75 in (2.00 m)
- Listed weight: 243 lb (110 kg)

Career information
- NBA draft: 1992: undrafted
- Playing career: 1990–2010
- Position: Power forward

Career history

Playing
- 1990–2005: Bayi Rockets
- 2007–2010: Fujian Sturgeons

Coaching
- 2009–2010: Fujian Sturgeons (assistant)

Career highlights
- 8× CBA champion (1995–2001, 2003); CBA MVP (2002); 2× CBA Finals MVP (2002, 2003); CBA Scoring Champion (2002); CBA Player of the Decade (1995–2005); 2× CBA All-Star Game MVP (2001, 2003)
Medals
Men's basketball
Representing China
FIBA Asia Cup
| Gold medal – first place | 1993 Jakarta |
| Gold medal – first place | 1995 Seoul |
| Bronze medal – third place | 1997 Riyadh |
| Gold medal – first place | 1999 Fukuoka |
| Gold medal – first place | 2001 Shanghai |
Asian Games
| Gold medal – first place | 1994 Hiroshima |
| Gold medal – first place | 1998 Bangkok |
| Silver medal – second place | 2002 Busan |
East Asian Games
| Gold medal – first place | 2001 Osaka |
Universiade Games
| Bronze medal – third place | 1993 Buffalo |
ABC Under-18 Championship
| Bronze medal – third place | 1990 Nagoya |

Liu Yudong (simplified Chinese: 刘玉栋; traditional Chinese: 劉玉棟; pinyin: Liú Yùdòng; nickname: "War God (战神)"; born October 23, 1970 in Putian, Fujian), is a Chinese former professional basketball player who last played for the Fujian Xunxing club in the Chinese Basketball Association (CBA). At 2.00 m (6'6 3/4") and 243 lbs. (110 kg), he played at the power forward position. In 1990, he was chosen as one of China's 50 all-time greatest basketball players. He held the CBA record for most career points scored (8,387 points), until it was broken by Zhu Fangyu, on 1/1/2012. He was the CBA Regular Season MVP in 2002, and the CBA League MVP in 2002 and 2003, and is known as one of the greatest Chinese players of all-time.

== Professional career ==
Liu spent his first eight CBA seasons with the Bayi Rockets (1995–2003), where he became the second best scorer in CBA history, with a scoring average of 27.9 points per game. He was reportedly offered a contract by the Denver Nuggets in 1998, but turned it down as he would not be able to play for the national team. After winning the CBA championship in all but one season – 2002, to a Yao Ming-led Shanghai Sharks team, Liu retired in 2003, because of a knee injury. He came back the next season, and was voted to the CBA All-Star Game. Liu retired again in 2005, due to his troublesome knees, and he became an assistant coach for the Rockets. In 2007, Liu came out of a two-year retirement to lead the Fujian Xinxing and retired for the last time in 2009 at the age of 39.

== Statistics ==
=== CBA Statistics ===
| Year | Team | GP | MPG | FG% | 3PT% | FT% | RPG | APG | SPG | BPG | PPG |
|---|---|---|---|---|---|---|---|---|---|---|---|
| 1995-96 | Bayi | 25 | 21.3 | .568 | .555 | .774 | 5.4 | 1.8 | 1.3 | 1.1 | 24.2 |
| 1996-97 | Bayi | 28 | 27.8 | .589 | .432 | .781 | 6.5 | 1.2 | 1.9 | 1.3 | 27.9 |
| 1997-98 | Bayi | 9 | 24.1 | .505 | .497 | .682 | 3.8 | 0.4 | 0.6 | 0.8 | 20.1 |
| 1998-99 | Bayi | 28 | 29.4 | .592 | .387 | .824 | 6.4 | 0.9 | 1.1 | 0.4 | 24.3 |
| 1999-2000 | Bayi | 30 | 28.0 | .546 | .343 | .869 | 7.5 | 1.9 | 1.4 | 0.8 | 21.6 |
| 2000-01 | Bayi | 31 | 34.8 | .590 | .506 | .837 | 9.3 | 2.8 | 1.6 | 0.7 | 29.2 |
| 2001-02 | Bayi | 35 | 38.6 | .532 | .441 | .903 | 8.8 | 2.1 | 2.2 | 0.6 | 37.0 |
| 2002-03 | Bayi | 35 | 33.8 | .547 | .429 | .912 | 6.2 | 1.6 | 1.7 | 0.9 | 30.2 |
| 2004-05 | Bayi | 47 | 32.0 | .519 | .368 | .887 | 6.1 | 1.4 | 1.5 | 0.3 | 23.4 |
| 2007-08 | Fujian | 34 | 29.9 | .496 | .422 | .833 | 5.2 | 0.7 | 1.1 | 0.3 | 17.8 |
| 2008-09 | Fujian | 50 | 15.8 | .494 | .440 | .875 | 2.7 | 0.4 | 0.4 | 0.1 | 10.6 |

== Personal life and player profile ==
Liu is a senior colonel in the People's Liberation Army. He was also the flag bearer of the Chinese sports delegation at the opening ceremony of the 1996 Summer Olympics and 2000 Summer Olympics.

Liu is known for being one of the most lethal scorers in international basketball of all-time, with his signature mid-range jumper, often leading him to be referred as "中距离王 (Mid-range King)" by fans throughout China. Liu was also a very clutch player throughout his career, having many of his best games in the playoffs including a 53-point, 15-rebound performance against the Shanghai Sharks in game 4 of the 2001 CBA finals, clinching that year's championship.

Liu was one of the greatest players that China has ever produced, and one of 3 Chinese players in the 1990s that was offered a contract by an NBA team. In an exhibition prior to the 1996 Olympics, Liu scored 24 points and added 7 rebounds against Team USA in an 81-118 loss. Liu was a pure scorer at 2.00m and 243 lbs, but a lack of conditioning later in his career cost him a string of injuries that derailed the twilight years of his career.

== Sources ==
- Yao Ming: The Road to the NBA by C.F. Xiao, translated by Philip Robyn, Page 139
