= Sun Jun (basketball) =

Chinese basketball player and coach

Sun Jun 孙军
Personal information
- Born: 22 June 1969 (age 57) Changchun, Jilin, China
- Listed height: 6.49 ft 0 in (1.98 m)

Career information
- Playing career: 1989–2005
- Position: Power forward

Career history
- 1998–2005: Jilin Northeast Tigers
Medals
Men's basketball
Representing China
FIBA Asia Cup
Gold medal – first place	1991 Kobe
Gold medal – first place	1993 Jarkata
Gold medal – first place	1995 Seoul
Gold medal – first place	1999 Fukuoka
Asian Games
Gold medal – first place	1994 Hiroshima
Gold medal – first place	1998 Bangkok
Universiade Games
Bronze medal – third place	1993 Buffalo
East Asian Games
Gold medal – first place	1993 Shanghai
ABC Under-18 Championship
Gold medal – first place	1989 Manila

Sun Jun (Chinese: 孙军, born June 22, 1969, in Changchun, Jilin, China) is a retired Chinese professional basketball player who later served as a coach and general manager for the Jilin Northeast Tigers, as well as an assistant basketball coach with the Chinese national team. Standing 1.98 meters (6'6") tall, he played at the small forward position.

== CBA career ==
Sun Jun spent his entire playing career with the Jilin Northeast Tigers and helped the team gain membership in the Chinese Basketball Association (CBA) in 1998. He set the league record by scoring 70 points in 139–94 win over the Jinan Army squad on December 17, 2000, a mark which stood for nearly a decade until it was broken in March 2010. Sun was an eight-time CBA All-Star, won the CBA regular season MVP award in 1999 and 2003, and led the league in scoring in 1999, 2001, and 2003.

== National team career ==
Sun was selected to join the Chinese national youth team in 1986 and was a member of the senior squad between 1989 and 2003. He helped China win gold at the 1994 Asian Games and 1998 Asian Games, as well as achieve qualification for the 1994 FIBA World Championship, and 1992, 1996, and 2000 Summer Olympics.

== Coaching career ==
After serving as a player-coach with the Jilin Northeast Tigers for several years, Sun eventually became the club's CEO and general manager. After an ownership shake-up pushed him out in 2007, he moved to the national team as an assistant coach, before eventually returning to fill various roles in Jilin's front office.

== Career statistics ==
=== CBA statistics ===
Regular season and Playoffs combined

Year	Team	GP	MPG	2P%	3P%	FT%	RPG	APG	SPG	BPG	PPG
1998–99	Jilin	28	N/A	.501	.399	.813	3.6	3.1	1.5	0.2	31.5
1999–00	Jilin	28	N/A	.455	.318	.850	3.6	4.1	1.9	0.2	27.5
2000–01	Jilin	28	N/A	.452	.368	.793	4.0	3.9	1.6	0.3	28.9
2001–02	Jilin	32	N/A	.496	.410	.805	3.8	4.3	1.5	0.2	30.2
2002–03	Jilin	36	N/A	.543	.442	.840	3.8	3.5	1.3	0.2	30.3
2003–04	Jilin	26	N/A	.483	.409	.912	3.6	3.9	1.2	0.3	22.9
2004–05	Jilin	40	N/A	.431	.379	.798	2.4	2.2	0.8	0.1	12.6
2005–06	Jilin	2	N/A	.400	.000	.333	0.5	1.0	0.5	0.0	2.5
Career		220	INC	.484	.391	.828	3.5	3.5	1.4	0.2	25.6
