= Yao Ming =

Chinese basketball player and executive (born 1980)

- 姚明
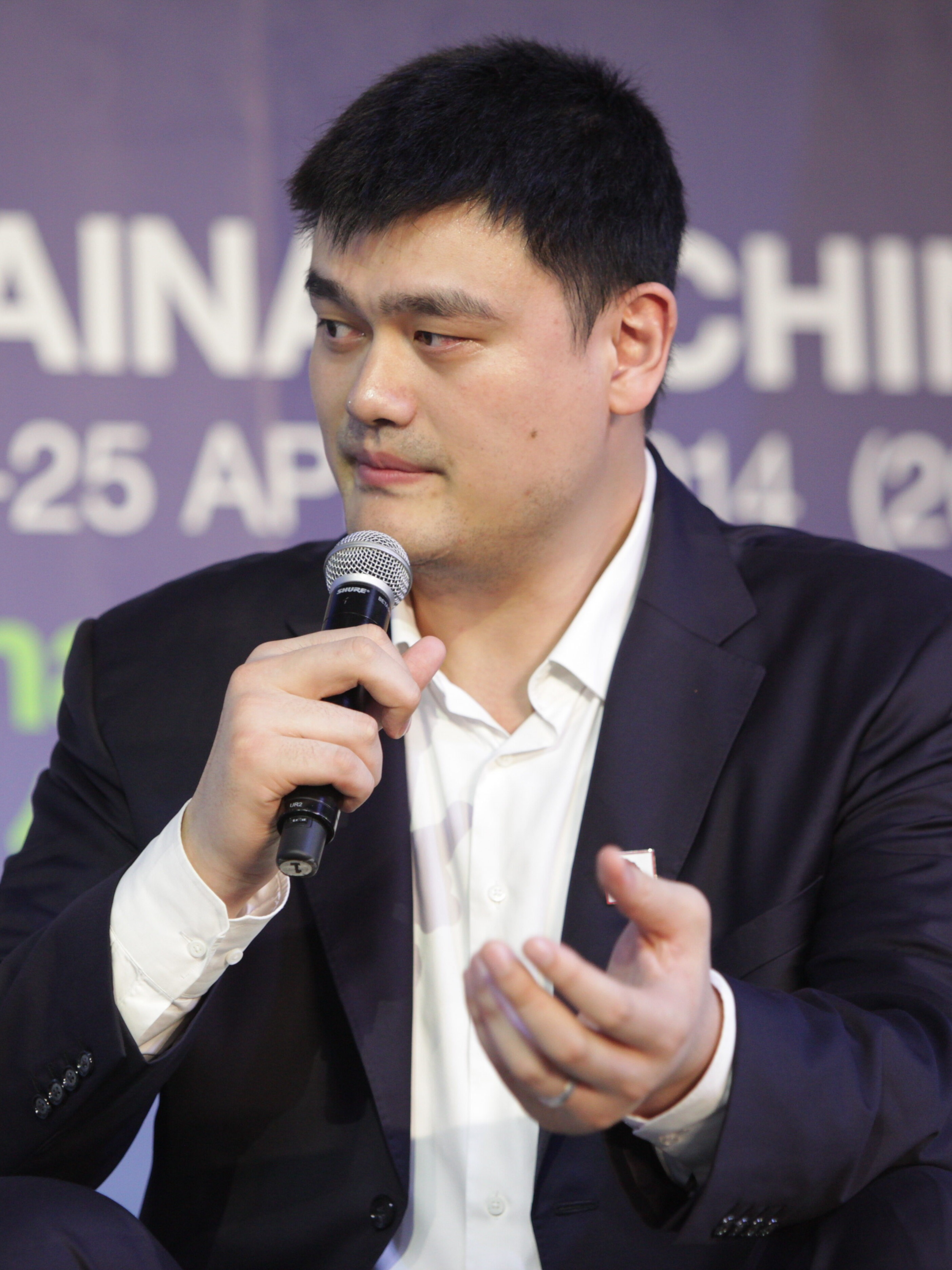
- Yao in 2014

President of the Chinese Basketball Association
- In office February 23, 2017 – October 31, 2024
- Preceded by: Yu Zaiqing
- Succeeded by: Guo Zhenming

Member of the Chinese People's Political Consultative Conference (12th)
- In office March 2013 – March 2018
- Chairman: Yu Zhengsheng

Personal details
- Born: September 12, 1980 (age 46) Shanghai, China
- Party: Independent
- Spouse: Ye Li (m. 2007)
- Children: 1
- Occupation: Basketball player / administrator
- Basketball career

Personal information
- Listed height: 7 ft 6 in (2.29 m)
- Listed weight: 310 lb (141 kg)

Career information
- NBA draft: 2002: 1st round, 1st overall pick
- Drafted by: Houston Rockets
- Playing career: 1997–2011
- Position: Center
- Number: 15, 11

Career history
- 1997–2002: Shanghai Sharks
- 2002–2011: Houston Rockets

Career highlights
- 8× NBA All-Star (2003–2009, 2011); 2× All-NBA Second Team (2007, 2009); 3× All-NBA Third Team (2004, 2006, 2008); NBA All-Rookie First Team (2003); No. 11 retired by Houston Rockets; CBA MVP (2001); CBA champion (2002); CBA Finals MVP (2001); No. 15 retired by Shanghai Sharks; 3× CBA rebounding leader (2000–2002); 3× CBA blocks leader (2000–2002); 3× FIBA Asia Cup MVP (2001, 2003, 2005)

Career NBA statistics
- Points: 9,247 (19.0 ppg)
- Rebounds: 4,494 (9.2 rpg)
- Blocks: 920 (1.9 bpg)
- Stats at NBA.com
- Stats at Basketball Reference
- Basketball Hall of Fame
- FIBA Hall of Fame
Medals
Men's basketball
Representing China
FIBA Asia Cup
Gold medal – first place	1999 Fukuoka
Gold medal – first place	2001 Shanghai
Gold medal – first place	2003 Harbin
Gold medal – first place	2005 Doha
Asian Games
Silver medal – second place	2002 Busan
Universiade Games
Silver medal – second place	2001 Beijing
East Asian Games
Gold medal – first place	2001 Osaka

Yao Ming
- Yao's name in Chinese characters
- Chinese: 姚明
Transcriptions
Standard Mandarin
- Hanyu Pinyin: Yáo Míng
- Bopomofo: ㄧㄠˊ ㄇㄧㄥˊ
- Gwoyeu Romatzyh: Yau Ming
- Wade–Giles: Yao^{2} Ming^{2}
- IPA: [jǎʊ mǐŋ]
Yue: Cantonese
- Yale Romanization: Yìuh Mìhng
- Jyutping: jiu4 ming4
- IPA: [jiw˩ mɪŋ˩]
Southern Min
- Hokkien POJ: Iâu Bêng

Yao Ming (Chinese: 姚明; born September 12, 1980) is a Chinese basketball executive and former professional player. He played for the Shanghai Sharks of the Chinese Basketball Association (CBA), and then spent his entire nine-year National Basketball Association (NBA) career with the Houston Rockets. He was an eight-time NBA All-Star, and was named to the All-NBA Team five times. At 7 feet 6 inches (2.29 m), he was the NBA's tallest active player in his final season.

Born in Shanghai, Yao began playing for the Sharks as a teenager, and played on their senior team for five years in the CBA, winning a championship in his final year. After negotiating with the CBA and the Sharks to secure his release, Yao was selected by the Rockets as the first overall pick in the 2002 NBA draft. He reached the NBA playoffs four times, and in 2009, helped the Rockets win their first playoff series since 1997. After missing several games due to a series of foot and ankle injuries in his last six seasons, Yao announced his retirement from professional basketball in 2011. Among Rockets franchise leaders, Yao ranks second in total blocks, sixth in total rebounds, and ranked sixth in total points at the time of his retirement.

Yao is one of China's best-known athletes internationally, with sponsorships with several major companies. His rookie year in the NBA was the subject of a documentary film, The Year of the Yao, and he co-wrote, along with NBA analyst Ric Bucher, an autobiography titled Yao: A Life in Two Worlds. Known in China as the "Yao Ming Phenomenon" and in the United States as the "Ming Dynasty", Yao's success in the NBA, and his popularity among fans, made him a symbol of a new China that was both more modern and more confident. Yao is also an entrepreneur and owner of Yao Family Wines in Napa Valley, California.

In April 2016, Yao was elected into the Naismith Memorial Basketball Hall of Fame, alongside Shaquille O'Neal and Allen Iverson, becoming the first Chinese national to be inducted into the Hall of Fame. In February 2017, Yao was unanimously elected as chairman of the Chinese Basketball Association. Yao had a storied career as a member of the Chinese national team. With the national team, Yao won the FIBA Asia Cup in 2001, 2003, and 2005, winning MVP of the tournament all three times. He also made the All-Tournament Team at the FIBA World Cup in 2002. Yao announced his international retirement after the 2008 Beijing Olympics.

== Early life ==
Yao Ming was born on September 12, 1980, in Shanghai, China. He is the only child of 6-foot-7-inch (2.01 m) Yao Zhiyuan and 6-foot-3-inch (1.91 m) Fang Fengdi, both of whom were former professional basketball players. At birth, Yao weighed 11 pounds (5.0 kg), more than twice the average weight of a Chinese newborn. When Yao was nine years old, he began playing basketball and attended a junior sports school. The following year, Yao measured 5 feet 5 inches (1.65 m) and was examined by sports doctors, who predicted he would grow to 7 feet 3 inches (2.21 m).

== Professional career ==
=== Shanghai Sharks (1997–2002) ===
Yao first tried out for the Shanghai Sharks' junior team of the Chinese Basketball Association (CBA) when he was 13 years old, and practiced ten hours a day for his acceptance. After playing with the junior team for four years, Yao joined the Sharks' senior team, where he averaged 10 points and 8 rebounds a game in his rookie season. His next season was cut short when he broke his foot for the second time in his career, which Yao said decreased his jumping ability by four to six inches (10 to 15 cm). The Sharks made the finals of the CBA in Yao's third season and again the next year, but lost both times to the Bayi Rockets. When Wang Zhizhi left the Bayi Rockets to become the first NBA player from China the following year, the Sharks finally won their first CBA championship. During the playoffs in his final year with Shanghai, Yao averaged 38.9 points and 20.2 rebounds a game, while shooting 76.6% from the field, and made all 21 of his shots during one game in the finals.

=== Houston Rockets (2002–2011) ===
Yao was pressured to enter the NBA draft in 1999 by Li Yaomin, the deputy general manager of the Shanghai Sharks. Li also influenced Yao to sign a contract for Evergreen Sports Inc. to serve as his agent. The agreement entitled Evergreen to 33% of Yao's earnings, but the contract was later determined to be invalid.

As American attention on Yao grew, Chinese authorities also took interest. In 2002, the Chinese government released new regulations that would require him and other Chinese players to turn over half of any NBA earnings to the government and China's national basketball association, including endorsements as well as salaries.

When Yao decided to enter the 2002 NBA draft, a group of advisers was formed that came to be known as "Team Yao". The team consisted of Yao's negotiator, Erik Zhang; his NBA agent, Bill Duffy; his Chinese agent, Lu Hao; University of Chicago economics professor John Huizinga; and the vice president for marketing at BDA Sports Management, Bill Sanders. Yao was widely predicted to be picked number one overall. However, some teams were concerned about Yao's NBA eligibility because of uncertainty over whether the CBA would let Yao play in the United States.

Shortly after Wang Zhizhi refused to return to China to play for the national team and was subsequently banned from representing China internationally, the CBA stipulated that Yao would have to return to play for the national team. They also said they would not let him go to the United States unless the Houston Rockets would take him first overall. After assurances from Team Yao that the Rockets would draft Yao with their number one pick, the CBA gave permission on the morning of the draft for Yao to play in the U.S. When the Rockets selected Yao with the first pick of the draft, he became the first international player ever to be selected first overall without having previously played U.S. college basketball.

==== Beginning years (2002–2005) ====
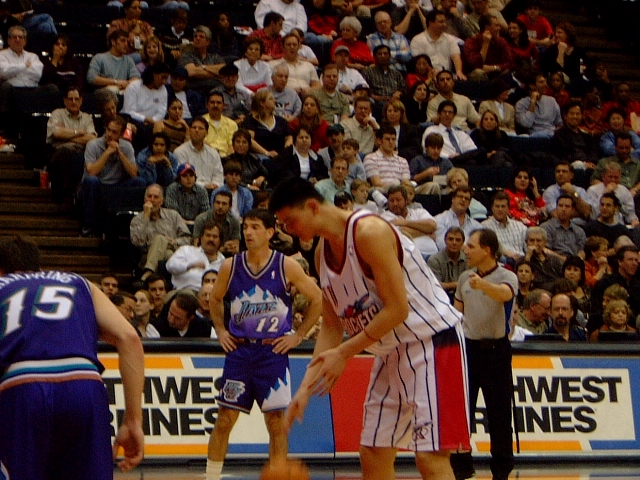
Yao prepares to shoot a free throw with John Stockton in the background

Yao did not participate in the Rockets' pre-season training camp, instead playing for China in the 2002 FIBA World Championships. Before the season, several commentators, including Bill Simmons and Dick Vitale, predicted that Yao would fail in the NBA, and Charles Barkley said he would "kiss Kenny Smith's ass" if Yao scored more than 19 points in one of his rookie-season games. Yao played his first NBA game against the Indiana Pacers, scoring no points and grabbing two rebounds, and scored his first NBA basket against the Denver Nuggets. In his first seven games, he averaged only 14 minutes and 4 points, but on November 17, he scored 20 points on a perfect 9-of-9 from the field and 2-of-2 from the free-throw line against the Lakers. Barkley made good on his bet by kissing the buttock of a donkey purchased by Smith for the occasion (Smith's "ass").

In Yao's first game in Miami on December 16, 2002, the Heat passed out 8,000 fortune cookies, an East Asian cultural stereotype. Yao was not angry with the promotion because he was not familiar with American stereotypes of Chinese. In an earlier interview in 2000, Yao said he had never seen a fortune cookie in China and guessed it must have been an American invention.

Before Yao's first meeting with Shaquille O'Neal on January 17, 2003, O'Neal said, "Tell Yao Ming, ching chong-yang-wah-ah-soh", prompting accusations of racism. O'Neal denied that his comments were racist, and said he was only joking. Yao also said he believed O'Neal was joking, but he said a lot of Asians would not see the humor. In the game, Yao scored the Rockets' first six points of the game and blocked O'Neal twice in the opening minutes as well as altering two other shots by O'Neal, all 4 of those attempts coming right at the rim, and made a game-sealing dunk with 10 seconds left in overtime. Yao finished with 10 points, 10 rebounds, and 6 blocks; O'Neal recorded 31 points, 13 rebounds, and 0 blocks. O'Neal later expressed regret for the way he treated Yao early in his career.

The NBA began offering All-Star ballots in three languages—English, Spanish and Chinese—for fan voting of the starters for the 2003 NBA All-Star Game. Yao was voted to start for the West over O'Neal, who was coming off three consecutive NBA Finals MVP Awards. Yao received nearly a quarter million more votes than O'Neal, and he became the first rookie to start in the All-Star Game since Grant Hill in 1995.

Yao finished his rookie season averaging 13.5 points and 8.2 rebounds per game, and was second in the NBA Rookie of the Year Award voting to Amar'e Stoudemire, and a unanimous pick for the NBA All-Rookie First Team selection. He was also voted the Sporting News Rookie of the Year, and won the Laureus Newcomer of the Year award.

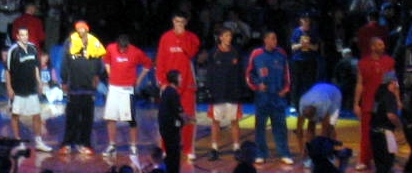
Yao (fourth from left) standing with the Sophomores team during the 2004 Rookie Challenge game.

Before the start of Yao's sophomore season, Rockets' head coach Rudy Tomjanovich resigned because of health issues, and long-time New York Knicks head coach Jeff Van Gundy was brought in. After Van Gundy began focusing the offense on Yao, Yao averaged career highs in points and rebounds for the season, and had a career-high 41 points and 7 assists in a triple-overtime win against the Atlanta Hawks in February 2004. He was also voted to be the starting center for the Western Conference in the 2004 NBA All-Star Game for the second straight year. Yao finished the season averaging 17.5 points and 9.0 rebounds a game. The Rockets made the playoffs for the first time in Yao's career, claiming the seventh seed in the Western Conference. In the first round, however, the Los Angeles Lakers eliminated Houston in five games. Yao averaged 15.0 points and 7.4 rebounds in his first playoff series.

In the summer of 2004, the Rockets acquired Tracy McGrady from the Orlando Magic in a seven-player trade that also sent Steve Francis and Cuttino Mobley to Orlando. Although Yao said that Francis and Mobley had "helped [him] in every way [his] first two seasons", he added, "I'm excited about playing with Tracy McGrady. He can do some amazing things." After the trade, it was predicted that the Rockets would be title contenders. Both McGrady and Yao were voted to start in the 2005 NBA All-Star Game, and Yao broke the record previously held by Michael Jordan for most All-Star votes, with 2,558,278 total votes. The Rockets won 51 games and finished fifth in the West, and made the playoffs for the second consecutive year, where they faced the Dallas Mavericks. The Rockets won the first two games in Dallas, and Yao made 13 of 14 shots in the second game, the best shooting performance in the playoffs in Rockets history. However, the Rockets lost four of their last five games and lost Game 7 by 40 points, the largest Game 7 deficit in NBA history. Yao's final averages for the series were 21.4 points on 65% shooting and 7.7 rebounds.

==== Career highs and injury-plagued seasons (2005–2011) ====
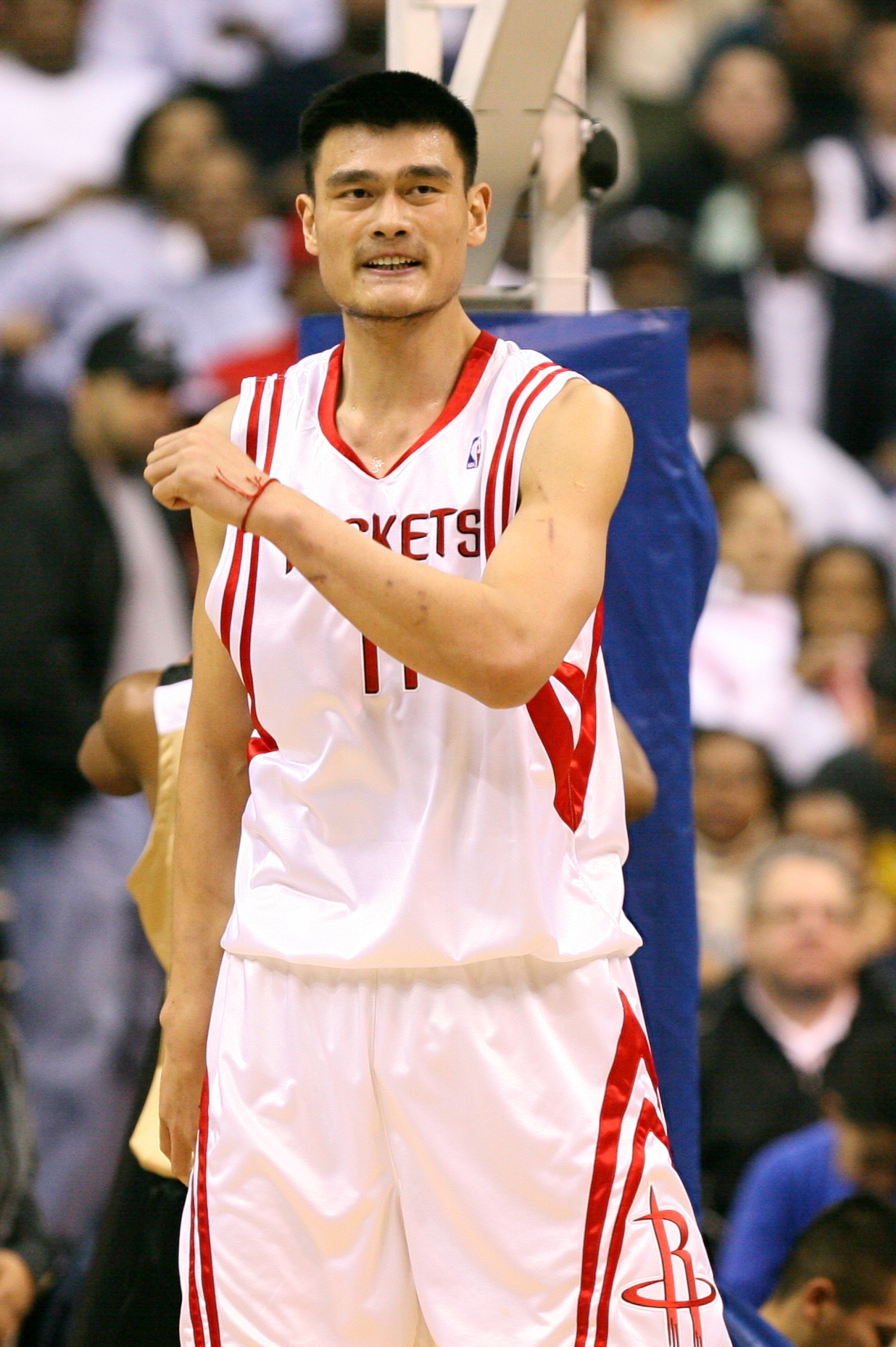
In his fifth season, Yao averaged a career-high 25 points per game.

After missing only two games out of 246 in his first three years of NBA play, Yao was rewarded with a five-year, $75 million extension during the 2005 offseason. However, he endured an extended period on the inactive list in his fourth season after developing osteomyelitis in the big toe on his left foot, and surgery was performed on the toe on December 18, 2005. Despite missing 21 games while recovering, Yao again had the most fan votes to start the 2006 NBA All-Star Game.

In 25 games after the All-Star break, Yao averaged 25.7 points and 11.6 rebounds per game, while shooting 53.7% from the field and 87.8% at the free-throw line. His final averages in 57 games were 22.3 points and 10.2 rebounds per game. It was the first time that he ended the season with a so-called "20/10" average. However, Tracy McGrady played only 47 games in the season, missing time because of back spasms. Yao and McGrady played only 31 games together, and the Rockets did not make the playoffs, winning only 34 games. With only four games left in the season, Yao suffered another injury in a game against the Utah Jazz on April 10, 2006, which left him with a broken bone in his left foot. The injury required six months of rest.

Early into his fifth season, Yao was injured again, this time breaking his right knee on December 23, 2006, while attempting to block a shot. Up to that point he had been averaging 26.8 points, 9.7 rebounds and 2.3 blocks per game, and had been mentioned as an MVP candidate. Yao was unable to play in what would have been his fifth All-Star game; he was medically cleared to play on March 4, 2007, after missing 32 games.

Despite Yao's absence, the Rockets made the playoffs with the home court advantage against the Utah Jazz in the first round. The Rockets won the first two games, but then lost four of five games and were eliminated in Game 7 at home; Yao scored 29 points—15 in the fourth quarter. Although he averaged 25.1 points and 10.3 rebounds for the series, Yao said afterwards "I didn't do my job". At the end of the season, Yao was selected to the All-NBA Second Team for the first time in his career, after being selected to the All-NBA Third Team twice.

On May 18, 2007, only weeks after the Rockets were eliminated from the playoffs, Jeff Van Gundy was dismissed as head coach. Three days later, the Rockets signed former Sacramento Kings coach Rick Adelman, who was thought to focus more on offense than the defensive-minded Van Gundy.

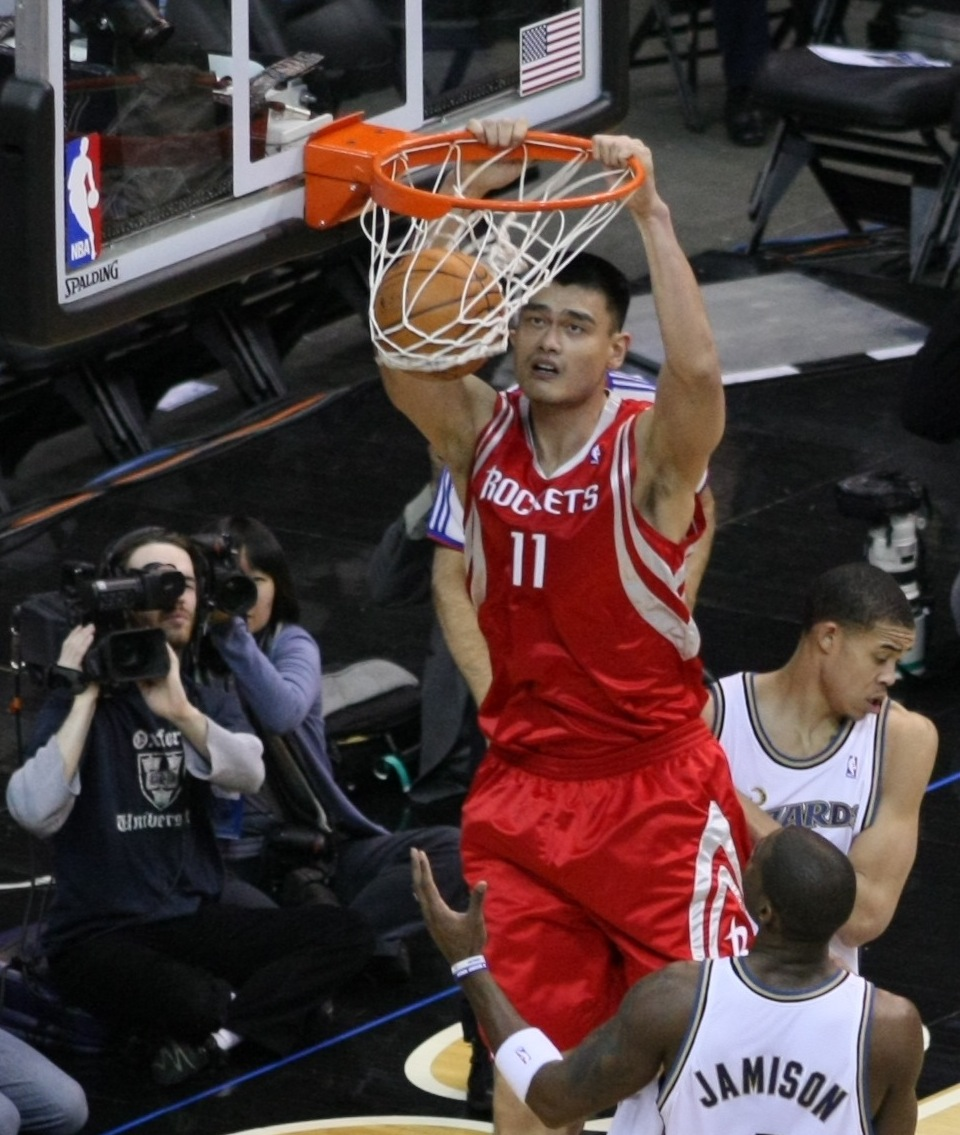
Yao advanced to the second round of the playoffs for the only time in his career in 2009.

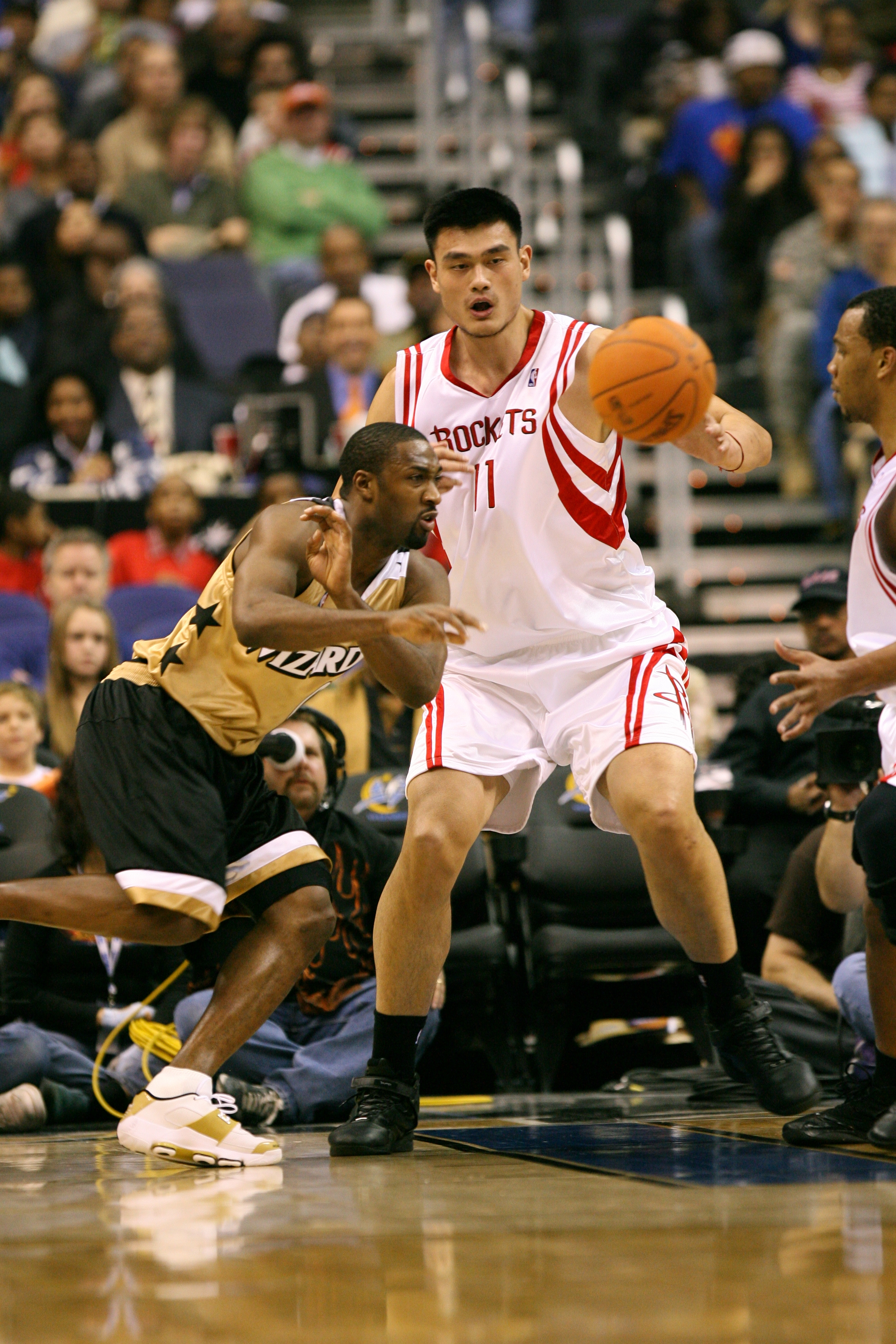
Yao playing against Gilbert Arenas

On November 9, 2007, Yao played against fellow Chinese NBA and Milwaukee Bucks player Yi Jianlian for the first time. The game, which the Rockets won 104–88, was broadcast on 19 networks in China, and was watched by over 200 million people in China alone, making it one of the most-watched NBA games in history. In the 2008 NBA All-Star Game, Yao was once again voted to start at center for the Western Conference. Before the All-Star weekend, the Rockets had won eight straight games, and after the break, they took their win streak to 12 games. On February 26, 2008, however, it was reported that Yao would miss the rest of the season with a stress fracture in his left foot. He missed the 2008 NBA playoffs, but he did not miss the 2008 Summer Olympics at Beijing, China in August. After Yao's injury, the Rockets stretched their winning streak to 22 games, at the time the second-longest such streak in NBA history. Yao underwent a successful operation on March 3, which placed screws in his foot to strengthen the bone, and recovery time was estimated at four months. Yao's final averages in 55 games were 22.0 points, 10.8 rebounds, and 2.0 blocks a game.

The next season, Yao played 77 games, his first full season since the 2004–05 season, and averaged 19.7 points and 9.9 rebounds, while shooting 54.8% from the field, and a career-high 86.6% from the free throw line. Despite McGrady suffering a season-ending injury in February, the Rockets finished with 53 wins and the fifth seed in the Western Conference. Facing the Portland Trail Blazers in the first round, Yao finished with 24 points on 9-of-9 shooting in the first game, and the Rockets won 108–81, in Portland. The Rockets won all their games in Houston, and advanced to the second round of the playoffs for the first time since 1997, and the first time in Yao's career.

The Rockets faced the Lakers in the second round, and Yao scored 28 points, with 8 points in the final four minutes, to lead the Rockets to a 100–92 win in Los Angeles. However, the Rockets lost their next two games, and Yao was diagnosed with a sprained ankle after Game 3. A follow-up test revealed a hairline fracture in his left foot, and he was ruled out for the remainder of the playoffs. In reaction, Yao said the injury, which did not require surgery, was "better than last year". However, follow-up analysis indicated that the injury could be career threatening. The Yao-less Rockets went on to win Game 4 against the Lakers to even the series 2–2. The Rockets eventually lost the series in seven games.

In July 2009, Yao discussed the injury with his doctors, and the Rockets applied for a disabled player exception, an exception to the NBA salary cap which grants the injured player's team money to sign a free agent. The Rockets were granted the exception, and used approximately $5.7 million on free agent Trevor Ariza. After weeks of consulting, it was decided that Yao would undergo surgery in order to repair the broken bone in his left foot. He did not play the entire 2009–10 season.

For the 2010–11 season, the Rockets said they would limit Yao to 24 minutes a game, with no plan to play him on back-to-back nights. Their goal was to keep Yao healthy in the long term. On December 16, 2010, it was announced that Yao had developed a stress fracture in his left ankle, related to an older injury, and would miss the rest of the season. In January 2011, he was voted as the Western Conference starting center for the 2011 All-Star Game for the eighth time in nine seasons. Injured All-Stars are usually required to attend the All-Star functions and to be introduced at the game, but Yao was not in Los Angeles because of his rehabilitation schedule after his surgery. Yao's contract with the Rockets expired at the end of the season, and he became a free agent.

=== Retirement ===
On July 20, 2011, Yao announced his retirement from basketball in a press conference in Shanghai. He cited injuries to his foot and ankle, including the third fracture to his left foot sustained near the end of 2010. His retirement sparked over 1.2 million comments on the Chinese social-networking site Sina Weibo. Reacting to Yao's retirement, NBA commissioner David Stern said Yao was a "bridge between Chinese and American fans" and that he had "a wonderful mixture of talent, dedication, humanitarian aspirations and a sense of humor." Shaquille O'Neal said Yao "was very agile. He could play inside, he could play outside, and if he didn't have those injuries he could've been up there in the top five centers to ever play the game."

Yao was nominated by a member of the Chinese media for the Naismith Basketball Hall of Fame as a contributor to the game. He would have been eligible for induction as early as 2012, but Yao felt it was too soon and requested that the Hall of Fame delay consideration of the nomination. The Hall granted Yao's request, and said it was Yao's decision when the process would be restarted.

On September 9, 2016, Yao was inducted into the Hall of Fame along with 4-time NBA champion Shaquille O'Neal and Allen Iverson. Continuing with the honors, on February 3, 2017, Yao's Number 11 jersey was retired by the Houston Rockets.

== National team career ==
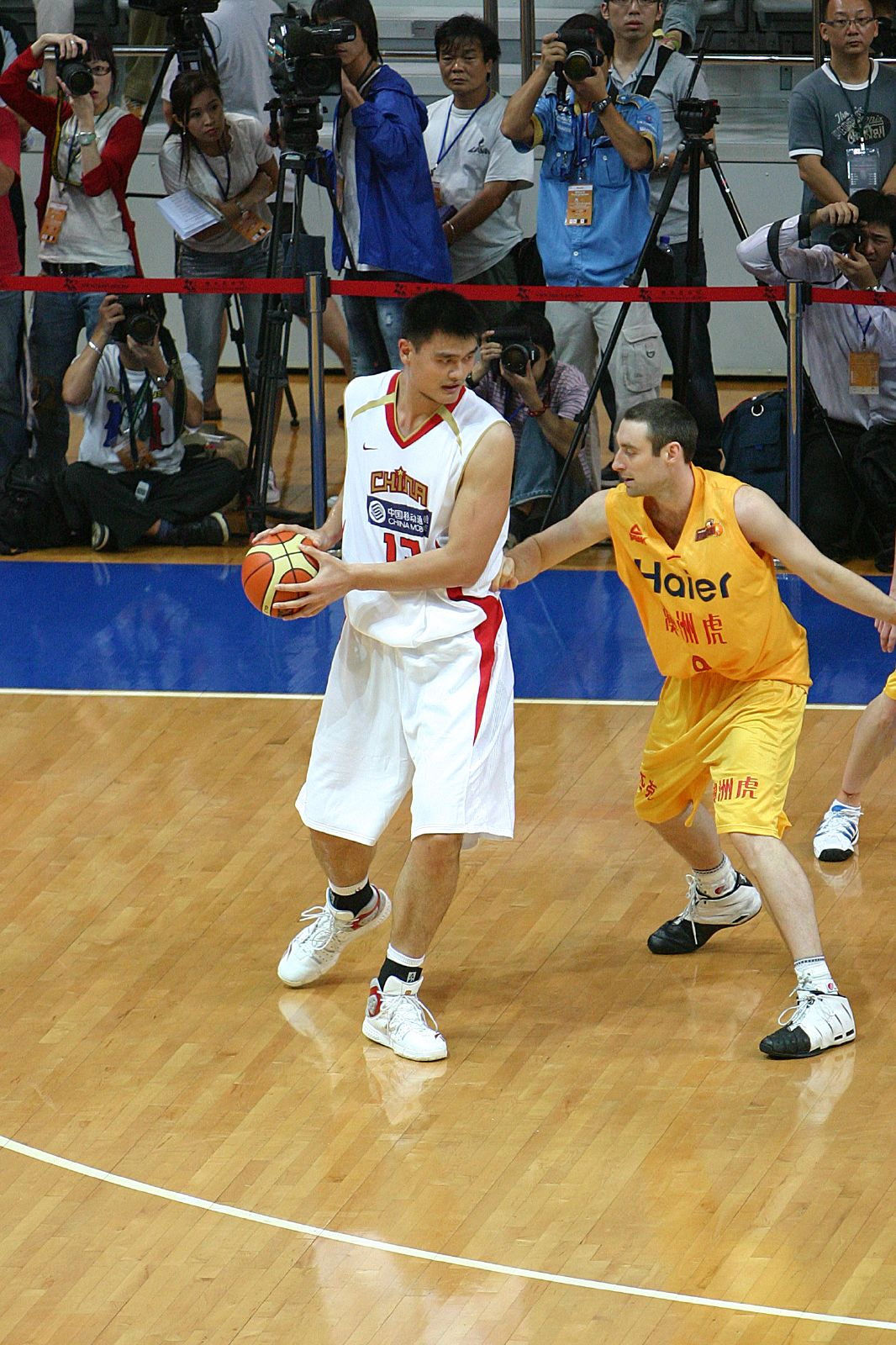
Yao was the leading scorer of the 2006 FIBA World Championship.

=== 2000 and 2004 Olympics ===
Yao first played for China in the 2000 Summer Olympics, and he was dubbed, together with 7 ft (2.1 m) teammates Wang Zhizhi and Mengke Bateer, "the Walking Great Wall". During the 2004 Athens Olympics, Yao carried the Chinese flag during the opening ceremony, which he said was a "long dream come true". He then vowed to abstain from shaving his beard for half a year unless the Chinese national team made it into the quarter-finals of the 2004 Olympics. After Yao scored 39 points in a win against New Zealand, China lost 58–83, 57–82, and 52–89 against Spain, Argentina and Italy respectively. In the final group game, however, a 67–66 win over the reigning 2002 FIBA World Champions Serbia and Montenegro moved them into the quarterfinals. Yao scored 27 points and had 13 rebounds, and he hit two free throws with 28 seconds left that proved to be the winning margin. He averaged 20.7 points and 9.3 rebounds per game while shooting 55.9% from the field.

=== Asian Cup ===
Yao led the Chinese national team to three consecutive FIBA Asia Cup gold medals, winning the 2001 FIBA Asian Championship, the 2003 FIBA Asian Championship, and the 2005 FIBA Asian Championship. He was also named the MVP of all three tournaments.

=== 2006 World Championship ===
Yao's injury at the end of the 2005–06 NBA season required a full six months of rest, threatening his participation in the 2006 FIBA World Championship. However, he recovered before the start of the tournament, and in the last game of the preliminary round, he had 36 points and 10 rebounds in a win against Slovenia to lead China into the Round of 16. In the first knockout round, however, China was defeated by eventual finalist Greece. Yao's final averages were 25.3 points, the most in the tournament, and 9.0 rebounds a game, which was fourth overall.

=== 2008 Olympics ===
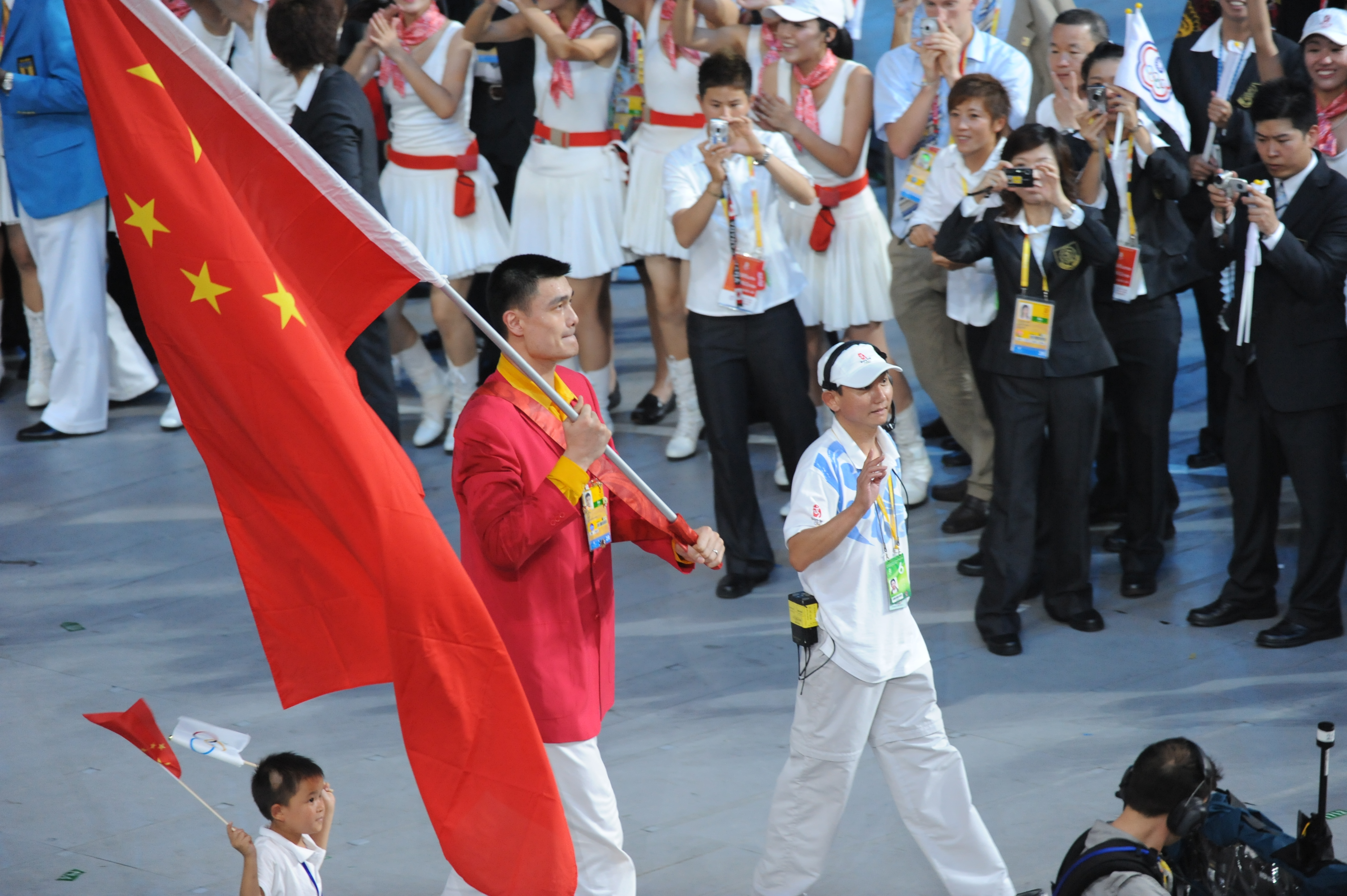
Yao carrying the Chinese flag during the opening ceremony of the 2008 Summer Olympics in Beijing

After having surgery to repair his fractured foot, Yao stated that if he could not play in the 2008 Summer Olympics in Beijing, "It would be the biggest loss in my career to right now." He returned to play with the Chinese national team on July 17, 2008. On August 6, Yao carried the Olympic flame into Tiananmen Square, as part of the Olympic torch relay. He also carried the Chinese flag and led his country's delegation during the opening ceremony. Yao scored the first basket of the game, a three-pointer, in China's opening 2008 Olympics Basketball Tournament game against the eventual gold medal-winning United States.

"I was just really happy to make that shot", Yao said after the Americans' 101–70 victory. "It was the first score in our Olympic campaign here at home and I'll always remember it. It represents that we can keep our heads up in the face of really tough odds."

Following an overtime defeat to Spain, Yao scored 30 points in a win over Angola, and 25 points in a three-point win against Germany, which clinched China's place in the quarterfinals. However, China lost to Lithuania in the quarterfinals by 26 points, eliminating them from the tournament. Yao's 19 points a game were the second-highest in the Olympics, and his averages of 8.2 rebounds and 1.5 blocks per game were third overall.

=== Chinese Basketball Association ===
Yao served as chair of the Chinese Basketball Association from 2017 until his resignation in 2024 due to personal issues.

== Career statistics ==
Legend
GP	Games played	GS	Games started	MPG	Minutes per game
FG%	Field goal percentage	3P%	3-point field goal percentage	FT%	Free throw percentage
RPG	Rebounds per game	APG	Assists per game	SPG	Steals per game
BPG	Blocks per game	PPG	Points per game	**Bold**	Career high

=== CBA statistics ===
Year	Team	GP	RPG	APG	FG%	FT%	PPG
1997–98	Shanghai	21	8.3	1.3	.615	.485	10.0
1998–99	Shanghai	12	12.9	1.7	.585	.699	20.9
1999–00	Shanghai	33	14.5	1.7	.585	.683	21.2
2000–01	Shanghai	22	19.4	2.2	.679	.799	27.1
2001–02	Shanghai	24	19.0	1.9	.721	.759	32.4
Career		122	15.4	1.8	.651	.723	23.4

=== NBA statistics ===
==== Regular season ====
Year	Team	GP	GS	MPG	FG%	3P%	FT%	RPG	APG	SPG	BPG	PPG
2002–03	Houston	**82**	72	29.0	.498	.500	.811	8.2	1.7	.4	1.8	13.5
2003–04	Houston	**82**	**82**	32.8	.522	.000	.809	9.0	1.5	.3	1.9	17.5
2004–05	Houston	80	80	30.6	**.552**	.000	.783	8.4	.8	.4	**2.0**	18.3
2005–06	Houston	57	57	34.2	.519	.000	.853	10.2	1.5	**.5**	1.6	22.3
2006–07	Houston	48	48	33.8	.516	.000	.862	9.4	2.0	.4	**2.0**	**25.0**
2007–08	Houston	55	55	**37.2**	.507	.000	.850	**10.8**	**2.3**	**.5**	**2.0**	22.0
2008–09	Houston	77	77	33.6	.548	**1.000**	.866	9.9	1.8	.4	1.9	19.7
2010–11	Houston	5	5	18.2	.486	.000	**.938**	5.4	.8	.0	1.6	10.2
Career		486	476	32.5	.524	.200	.833	9.2	1.6	.4	1.9	19.0
All-Star		6	6	17.0	.500	.000	.667	4.0	1.3	.2	.3	7.0

==== Playoffs ====
Year	Team	GP	GS	MPG	FG%	3P%	FT%	RPG	APG	SPG	BPG	PPG
2004	Houston	5	5	37.0	.456	.000	.765	7.4	**1.8**	**.4**	1.4	15.0
2005	Houston	7	7	31.4	**.655**	.000	.727	7.7	.7	.3	**2.7**	21.4
2007	Houston	7	7	**37.1**	.440	.000	.880	10.3	.9	.1	.7	**25.1**
2009	Houston	**9**	**9**	35.9	.545	.000	**.902**	**10.9**	1.0	**.4**	1.2	17.1
Career		28	28	35.3	.519	.000	.833	9.3	1.0	.3	1.5	19.8

== Awards and achievements ==
- Naismith Memorial Basketball Hall of Fame: Class of 2016
- FIBA Hall of Fame: Class of 2023
- 8× NBA All-Star: 2003, 2004, 2005, 2006, 2007, 2008, 2009, 2011
- 5× All-NBA Team:

- Second Team: 2007, 2009
- Third Team: 2004, 2006, 2008

- NBA All-Rookie First Team: 2003
- NBA Rookie All-Star Game: 2004
- Gold medal winner with Team China at the 2001, 2003, and 2005 FIBA Asia Cups
- MVP of the 2001, 2003, 2005 FIBA Asia Cups
- FIBA Diamond Ball Top Scorer: 2004
- All-Tournament Team, FIBA World Cup: 2002
- Chinese Basketball Association Champion: 2001–02
- Rebounding leader in CBA in 2001–02
- 2003 Sporting News Rookie of the Year
- 2003 Laureus Newcomer of the Year
- 2005 Proletarian Award, issued by the Chinese Communist Party

== Personal life ==
After Yao announced that he would enter the 2002 NBA draft, he told one American journalist that he had been studying English for two years, and that he liked the movie Star Wars but disliked hip hop. He was sometimes accompanied during interviews in Shanghai by one of his parents, whose basketball careers were derailed by the 1966–76 Cultural Revolution, and who came to his Shanghai Sharks games on bicycles.

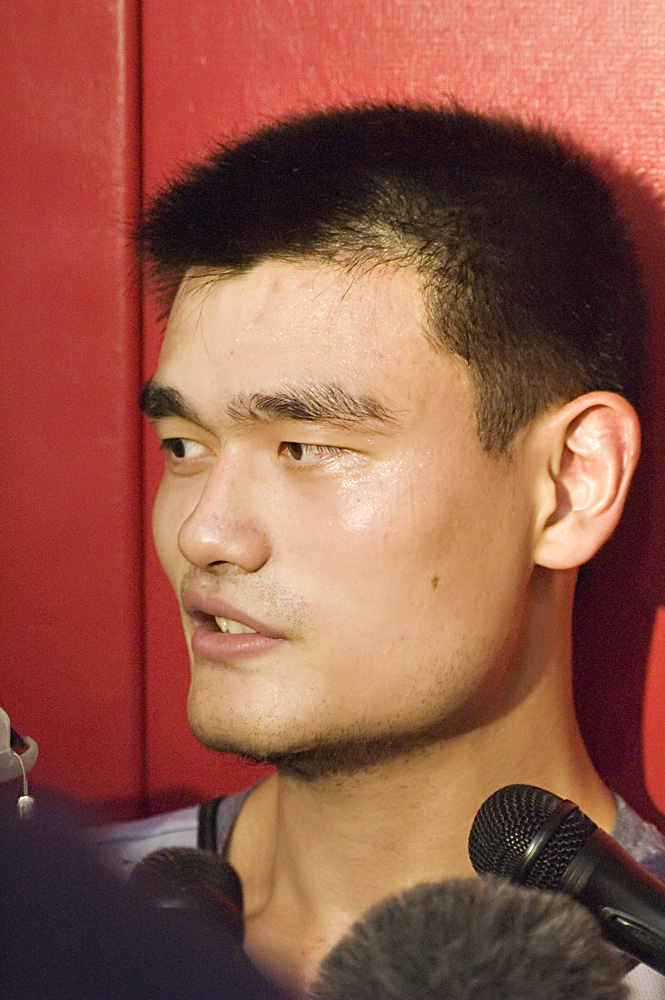
Yao answers questions from reporters, October 2006

Yao met Chinese female basketball player Ye Li when he was 17 years old. Ye was not fond of Yao at first, but finally accepted him after he gave her the team pins he had collected during the 2000 Summer Olympics. She is the only woman he has ever dated. Their relationship became public when they appeared together during the 2004 Olympics closing ceremony. On August 6, 2007, Yao and Ye married in a ceremony attended by close friends and family and closed to the media. On May 21, 2010, the couple's daughter Yao Qinlei (Chinese: 姚沁蕾; her English name is Amy) was born in Houston, Texas.

In 2004, Yao co-wrote an autobiography with ESPN sportswriter Ric Bucher, entitled Yao: A Life in Two Worlds. In the same year, he was also the subject of a documentary film, The Year of the Yao, which focuses on his NBA rookie year. The film is narrated by his friend and interpreter, Colin Pine. In 2005, former Newsweek writer Brook Larmer published a book entitled Operation Yao Ming, in which he said that Yao's parents were convinced to marry each other so that they would produce a dominant athlete, and that during Yao's childhood, he was given special treatment to help him become a great basketball player. In a 2015 AMA post on Reddit, Yao stated that this was not true and that he started playing basketball for fun at age 9. In 2009, Yao provided the voice for a character of a Chinese animated film, The Magic Aster, released on June 19.

Yao enrolled at the Antai College of Economics & Management of Shanghai Jiao Tong University in 2011. He took a tailored degree program with mostly one-on-one lectures to avoid being a distraction on campus. Yao completed his studies in July 2018, graduating with a degree in economics after 7 years of study.

In 2016, Yao opened a winery called Yao Family Wines in Napa Valley, California, which serves Cabernet Sauvignon blends and "the kind of rich-but-balanced luxury reds he'd come to enjoy in Houston steakhouses." American wine critic Robert M. Parker Jr. of The Wine Advocate gave Yao's wine a ranking of 96 points and wrote: "I am aware of all the arguments that major celebrities lending their names to wines is generally a formula for mediocrity, but... the two Cabernets are actually brilliant, and the reserve bottling ranks alongside just about anything made in Napa."

Yao and his wife, Ye Li, are the godparents of the cruise ship Majestic Princess of Princess Cruises, christening the ship on July 9, 2017.

== Other activities ==
=== Commercial engagements ===
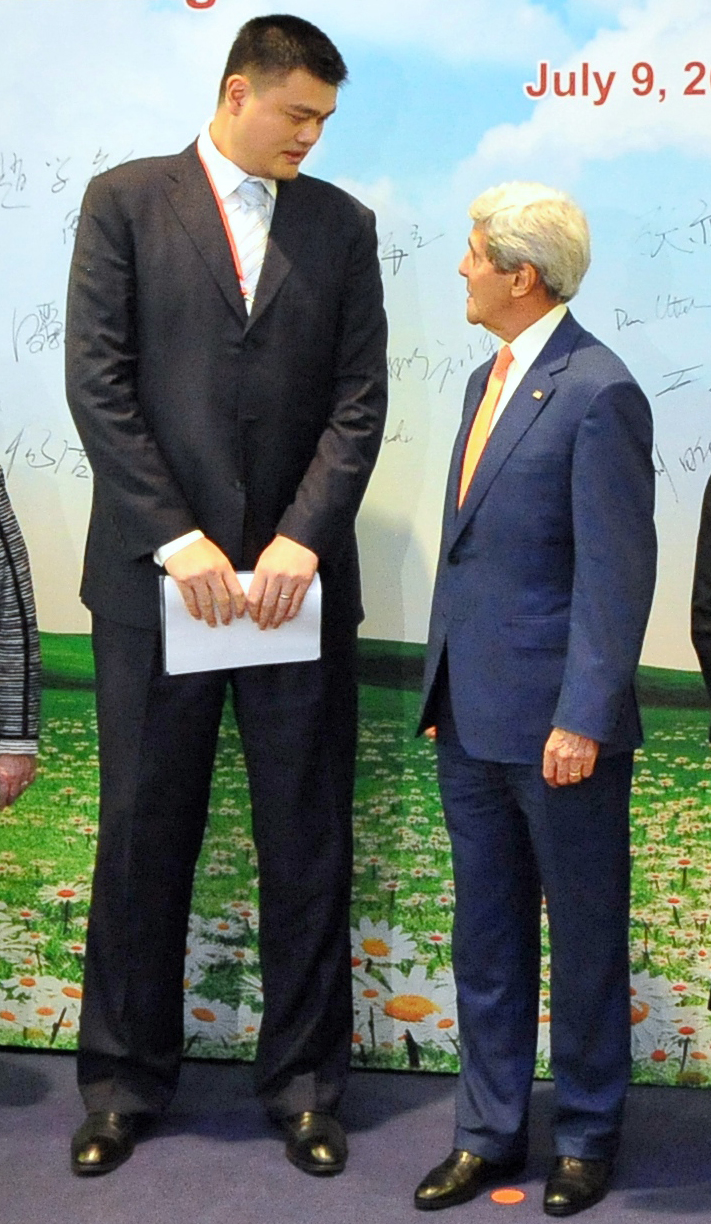
Yao (left) with United States Secretary of State John Kerry at the U.S.–China Strategic and Economic Dialogue in 2014

Yao is one of China's most recognizable athletes. As of 2009, he had led Forbes' Chinese celebrities list in income and popularity for six straight years, earning US$51 million (CN¥357 million) in 2008. A major part of his income comes from his sponsorship deals, as he is under contract with several major companies to endorse their products. He was signed by Nike until the end of his rookie season. When Nike decided not to renew his contract, he signed with Reebok. He also had a deal with Pepsi, and he successfully sued Coca-Cola in 2003 when they used his image on their bottles while promoting the national team. He eventually signed with Coca-Cola for the 2008 Olympics. His other deals include partnerships with Visa, Apple, Garmin, and McDonald's.

On July 16, 2009, Yao bought his former club team, the Shanghai Sharks, which were on the verge of not being able to play the next season of the Chinese Basketball Association because of financial troubles.

=== Philanthropy ===
Yao has also participated in many charity events during his career, including the NBA's Basketball Without Borders program. In the NBA's offseason in 2003, Yao hosted a telethon, which raised US$300,000 to help stop the spread of SARS. In September 2007, he held an auction that raised US$965,000 (CN¥6.75 million), and competed in a charity basketball match to raise money for underprivileged children in China. He was joined by fellow NBA stars Steve Nash, Carmelo Anthony, and Baron Davis, and Hong Kong actor Jackie Chan. After the 2008 Sichuan earthquake, Yao donated $2 million to relief work and created the Yao Ming Foundation to help rebuild schools destroyed in the earthquake.

=== Conservation work ===
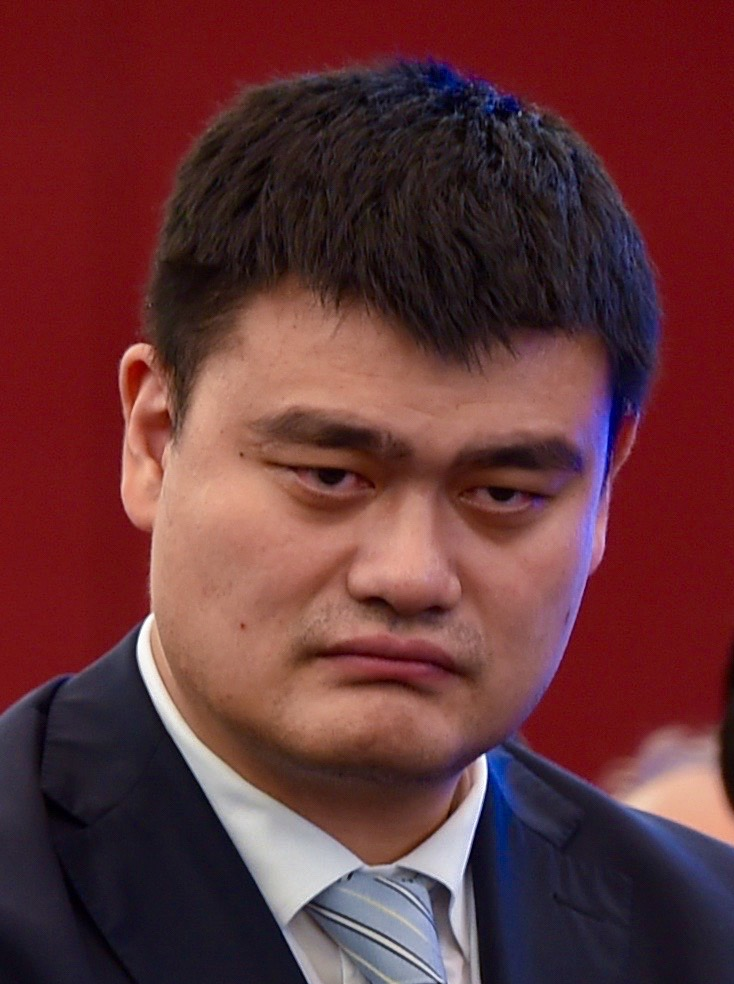
Yao in Beijing in 2016

Yao partnered with WildAid to appear in commercials and documentaries to educate citizens on the harmful effects of shark fin soup on shark species. From 2011 to 2018, consumption of shark fin soup dropped by 70% in China. In August 2012, Yao started filming a documentary about the northern white rhinoceros. He is also an ambassador for elephant conservation. In 2014, he was also part of the documentary The End of the Wild about elephant conservation. Yao has filmed a number of public service announcements for elephant and rhino conservation for the "Say No" campaign with partners African Wildlife Foundation and WildAid.

=== Politics ===
On March 3, 2013, Yao attended the First Session of the 12th Chinese People's Political Consultative Conference as one of its 2,200 members. He was a member of the CPPCC from 2013 to 2018. While he is involved in Chinese politics, he is not a member of the Chinese Communist Party, although he has been awarded the Proletarian Award by the party for his spreading of literacy and socialist ideologies.

== See also ==
- List of celebrities who own wineries and vineyards
- List of tallest players in National Basketball Association history

Olympic Games
Preceded by Liu Yudong	Flagbearer for China; Athens 2004; Beijing 2008	Succeeded by Yi Jianlian
Civic offices
Preceded by Yu Zaiqing	President of the Chinese Basketball Association; 2017–present	Incumbent
