= The End of the Wild =

Nature documentary

The End of the Wild is a documentary by CCTV, Animal Planet, NHNZ, WildAid and Yaoming. This was Yao Ming's first trip to the African mainland. He wanted to talk to the public about protecting elephants and rhinoceros. He also wanted to combat the poaching of elephant tusks and rhino horns.
