= 1997–98 Chinese Basketball Association season =

1997–98 CBA season
- League: Chinese Basketball Association
- Sport: Basketball
- Duration: November 23, 1997 – March 29, 1998
- TV partner(s): CCTV-5

Regular Season
- Season champions: Shandong Flaming Bulls
- Season MVP: (China) Gong Xiaobin
- Promoted to Second Division: Ji'nan Army; Zhejiang Squirrels
- Relegated to Second Division: Shenyang Army; Sichuan Pandas

Playoffs

Finals
- Champions: Bayi Rockets
- Runners-up: Liaoning Hunters

CBA seasons
- ← 1996–97 1998–99 →

The 1997–98 CBA season was the third season of the Chinese Basketball Association.

The season ran from November 23, 1997, to March 29, 1998.

The Ji'nan Army and Zhejiang Squirrels had been relegated to the Second Division after the previous season, but extenuating circumstances earned reprieves for both teams, and the league played with the same 12 clubs for the second straight year.

== Regular season standings ==
These are the final standings for the 1997–98 CBA regular season.

#	1997–98 CBA season							
#	Team	W	L	PCT	GB	Home	Road	Tiebreaker
1	Shandong Flaming Bulls	19	3	.864	–	11–0	8–3	SD 1–1 (163–149) BY
2	Bayi Rockets	19	3	.864	–	10–1	9–2	SD 1–1 (163–149) BY
3	Liaoning Hunters	17	5	.773	2	10–1	7–4	
4	Beijing Ducks	14	8	.636	5	9–2	5–6	
5	Jiangsu Dragons	12	10	.545	7	8–3	4–7	JS 1–1 (161–152) SH
6	Shanghai Sharks	12	10	.545	7	6–5	6–5	JS 1–1 (161–152) SH
7	Guangdong Southern Tigers	10	12	.455	9	7–4	3–8	
8	Ji'nan Army	9	13	.409	10	7–4	2–9	
9	Sichuan Pandas	7	15	.318	12	3–8	4–7	
10	Shenyang Army	6	16	.273	13	4–7	2–9	
11	Air Force	4	18	.182	15	3–8	1–10	
12	Zhejiang Squirrels	3	19	.136	16	2–9	1–10	

Key to colors
Top 8 teams advance to the Playoffs
Bottom 4 teams advance to the Relegation round

== Playoffs ==
The top 8 teams in the regular season advanced to the playoffs.

For the first time, the quarterfinals and semifinals used best-of-three series to determine the advancing team.

In the best-of-five Finals, the Bayi Rockets defeated the Liaoning Hunters (3–0) to win their third straight CBA championship, remaining unbeaten in their CBA playoffs history.

Teams in bold advanced to the next round. The numbers to the left of each team indicate the team's seeding in regular season, and the numbers to the right indicate the number of games the team won in that round. Home court advantage belongs to the team with the better regular season record; teams enjoying the home advantage are shown in italics.

Quarterfinals; Best of 3
1	**Shandong Flaming Bulls**	**2**
5	Jiangsu Dragons	1
3	**Liaoning Hunters**	**2**
7	Guangdong Southern Tigers	1
2	**Bayi Rockets**	**2**
8	Ji'nan Army	0
4	**Beijing Ducks**	**2**
6	Shanghai Sharks	1

Semifinals; Best of 3
1	Shandong Flaming Bulls	0
3	**Liaoning Hunters**	**2**
2	**Bayi Rockets**	**2**
4	Beijing Ducks	0

Finals; Best of 5
3	Liaoning Hunters	0
2	**Bayi Rockets**	**3**

== Relegations ==
The bottom 4 teams played the relegation phase by round-robin.

The Shenyang Army and Sichuan Pandas were relegated to the Second Division.

Team	W	L	PF	PA	PD
Zhejiang Squirrels	6	0	486	404	+82
Air Force	4	2	437	397	+40
Sichuan Pandas	1	5	431	469	−38
Shenyang Army	1	5	381	465	−84

Key to colors
Bottom 2 teams relegated to the Second Division

	AF	SA	SC	ZJ
Air Force	–	69–57	82–57	70–76
Shenyang Army	52–70	–	100–86	57–82
Sichuan Pandas	66–69	72–65	–	81–83
Zhejiang Squirrels	89–77	86–50	70–69	–

== CBA Awards ==
These are the award winners for the 1997-98 CBA regular season.

- CBA Most Valuable Player: Gong Xiaobin (Shandong Flaming Bulls)
- Sportsmanship Award: Yao Ming (Shanghai Sharks) & James Hodges (Jiangsu Dragons)
- Outstanding Coach: Wang Fei (Bayi Rockets) & Ye Peng (Shandong Flaming Bulls)

== All-Star Weekend ==
The 1998 CBA All-Star Game was played on April 4, 1998, in Shenyang, Liaoning.

The International All-Stars defeated the Chinese All-Stars 83–80.

James Hodges from the Jiangsu Dragons won the Slam Dunk Contest for the second straight year, and Zhang Jingsong from the Bayi Rockets won the Three-Point Shootout.

== See also ==
- Chinese Basketball Association
