= Shenzhen Yikang =

Chinese basketball team

Shenzhen Yikang (深圳易康) was a basketball team in the Chinese Basketball Association, for the 2001–2002 season, based in Qingyuan (清远). However, they finished last (and winless) and left the CBA, being relegated back to the "B" division from which they had been promoted.

They were formerly known as Shenzhen Runxun (深圳润迅), but changed names as a result of change of corporate sponsorship.
