= 2007–08 Chinese Basketball Association season =

2007–08 CBA season
- League: Chinese Basketball Association
- Sport: Basketball
- Duration: October 27, 2007 – February 22, 2008
- TV partner(s): CCTV-5, and many local channels.

Regular Season
- Season champions: Guangdong Southern Tigers
- Season MVP: (China) Zhu Fangyu

Finals
- Champions: Guangdong Southern Tigers
- Runners-up: Liaoning Dinosaurs
- Finals MVP: (China) Zhu Fangyu

CBA seasons
- ← 2006–07 2008–09 →

The 2007–08 CBA season was the 13th CBA season. The season was shortened due to the 2008 Beijing Olympics, and the regular season ended in early January 2008. Guangdong Southern Tigers won the CBA title, even after the departure of Yi Jianlian for NBA.

== Foreign Players ==
=== Draft ===
The draft for foreign players was held in Hawaii, United States.

Rnd.	Pick	Player	Nationality (Note: Nationality indicates the player's national team or representative nationality. If a player has not competed at the international level, then the nationality indicates the national team which the player is eligible to represent according to FIBA rules.)	Team
1	1	Nigel Dixon	USA	Yunnan Bulls
1	2	Major Wingate	USA	Shanxi Brave Dragons
1	3	Garnett Thompson	USA	Zhejiang Lions
1	4	Jeremee McGuire	USA	Shaanxi Kylins
1	5	Anthony Myles	USA	Dongguan Leopards
1	6	Dajuan Tate	USA	Jilin Northeast Tigers
1	7	Olumide Oyedeji	NGR	Beijing Ducks
1	8	Brandon Cole	USA	Xinjiang Flying Tigers
1	9	Jerod Ward	USA	Shanghai Sharks
1	10	Chris Porter	USA	Fujian Sturgeons
1	11	Soumaila Samake	MLI	Zhejiang Whirlwinds
1	12	Herve Lamizana	CIV	Shandong Lions
1	13	Ernest Brown	USA	Liaoning Hunters
1	14	Ryan Forehan-Kelly	USA	Jiangsu Dragons
1	15	Jason Dixon	USA	Guangdong Southern Tigers
2	1	Dontae' Jones	USA	Yunnan Bulls
2	2	Damon King	USA	Shanxi Brave Dragons
2	3	David Lucas	USA	Zhejiang Lions
2	4	Brandon Robinson	USA	Shaanxi Kylins
2	5	Franz Steyn	USA	Dongguan Leopards
2	6	Marcus Douthit	USA	Jilin Northeast Tigers
2	7	Michael Fey	USA	Beijing Ducks
2	8	David Jackson	USA	Xinjiang Flying Tigers
2	9	Scott Merritt	USA	Shanghai Sharks
2	10	Wesley Wilson	USA	Fujian Sturgeons
2	11	God Shammgod	USA	Zhejiang Whirlwinds
2	12	Mack Tuck	USA	Shandong Lions
2	13	Pat Simpson	USA	Liaoning Hunters
2	14	Raheim Brown	USA	Jiangsu Dragons
2	15	Cassiano Matheus	USA	Guangdong Southern Tigers
3	1	Rogers Washington	USA	Yunnan Bulls
3	2	Eric Sandrin	USA	Shanxi Brave Dragons
3	3	DeAngelo Collins	USA	Zhejiang Lions
3	4	Antoine Broxsie	USA	Shaanxi Kylins
3	5	Garry Hill-Thomas	USA	Dongguan Leopards
3	6	Steve Castleberry	USA	Jilin Northeast Tigers
3	7	Michael Parker	USA	Beijing Ducks
3	8	Adam Zahn	USA	Xinjiang Flying Tigers
3	9	Mark Flavin	USA	Shanghai Sharks
3	10	Ramel Allen	USA	Fujian Sturgeons
3	11	Johnny Phillips	USA	Zhejiang Whirlwinds
3	12	Travis Leech	USA	Shandong Lions
3	13	Derrick Franklin	USA	Liaoning Hunters
3	14	Damon Stringer	USA	Jiangsu Dragons
3	15	Shaun Malloy	USA	Guangdong Southern Tigers
4	1	Zach Anderson	USA	Yunnan Bulls
4	2	Dante Stiggers	USA	Shanxi Brave Dragons
4	3	Ivano Newbill	USA	Zhejiang Lions
4	4	Milone Clark	USA	Shaanxi Kylins
4	5	Kenny Tate	USA	Dongguan Leopards
4	6	Robert Day	USA	Jilin Northeast Tigers
4	7	Marquis Wright	USA	Beijing Ducks
4	8	Rodney Blackstock	USA	Xinjiang Flying Tigers
4	9	Sheldon Bailey	USA	Shanghai Sharks
4	10	Ronell Mingo	USA	Fujian Sturgeons
4	11	Peter Mulligan	USA	Zhejiang Whirlwinds
4	12	Jamaal Wise	USA	Shandong Lions
4	13	Bonell Colas	USA	Liaoning Hunters
4	14	Ronald Blackshear	USA	Jiangsu Dragons
4	15	Matt Vaughn	USA	Guangdong Southern Tigers

== Regular season ==
Xinjiang Flying Tigers finished the regular season with 26–4 in second place. Before the playoffs, it was determined that one of their players, Sou Song Cun, was not of Chinese nationality, thus violating the rule that each team may only have two foreign players. The league subsequently ruled Xinjiang loss with the score of 0–20 in all 18 matches in which Sou played, 15 of them wins originally. As a result, Xinjiang's dropped to eleventh place with 11–19, and they failed to advance to the playoffs.

#	2007–08 CBA season							
#	Team	W	L	PCT	GB	Home	Road	Tiebreaker
1	Guangdong Southern Tigers	26	4	.866	—	14–1	12–3	
2	Jiangsu Dragons	21	9	.700	5	14–1	7–8	
3	Shandong Lions	19	11	.633	7	14–1	7–8	SD 1–1 (202–189) LN
4	Liaoning Hunters	19	11	.633	7	11–4	8–7	SD 1–1 (202–189) LN
5	Dongguan Leopards	18	12	.600	8	11–4	7–8	DG 2–0 BY
6	Bayi Rockets	18	12	.600	8	12–3	6–9	DG 2–0 BY
7	Fujian Xunxing	17	13	.566	9	11–4	6–9	
8	Zhejiang Lions	15	15	.500	11	10–5	5–10	ZJ 1–1 (181–175) BJ
9	Beijing Ducks	15	15	.500	11	8–7	7–8	ZJ 1–1 (181–175) BJ
10	Zhejiang Whirlwinds	12	18	.400	14	9–6	3–12	
11	Xinjiang Flying Tigers	11	19	.366	15	5–10	6–9	
12	Yunnan Bulls	8	22	.266	18	6–9	2–13	YN 1–1 (240–238) SH
13	Shanghai Sharks	8	22	.266	18	4–11	4–11	YN 1–1 (240–238) SH
14	Jilin Northeast Tigers	7	23	.233	19	3–12	4–11	
15	Shaanxi Kylins	6	24	.200	20	6–9	0–15	
16	Shanxi Zhongyu	5	25	.166	21	5–10	0–15	

Key to colors
Top 8 teams advance to the Playoffs

== Playoffs ==
Top 4 teams may pick their opponents of the quarterfinal round in turn by the order of their regular season standings.

Teams in bold advanced to the next round. The numbers to the left of each team indicate the team's seeding in regular season, and the numbers to the right indicate the number of games the team won in that round. Home court advantage belongs to the team with the better regular season record; teams enjoying the home advantage are shown in italics.

Quarterfinals
1	**Guangdong Southern Tigers**	**3**
8	Zhejiang Lions	0
3	Shandong Lions	0
5	**Dongguan Leopards**	**3**
4	**Liaoning Dinosaurs**	**3**
6	Bayi Rockets	1
2	**Jiangsu Dragons**	3
7	Fujian Xunxing	2

Semifinals
1	**Guangdong Southern Tigers**	**3**
5	Dongguan Leopards	0
4	**Liaoning Dinosaurs**	**3**
2	Jiangsu Dragons	1

Final
1	**Guangdong Southern Tigers**	**4**
4	Liaoning Dinosaurs	1
