= 1998–99 Chinese Basketball Association season =

1998–99 CBA season
- League: Chinese Basketball Association
- Sport: Basketball
- Duration: December 27, 1998 – April 25, 1999
- TV partner: CCTV-5

Regular Season
- Season champions: Bayi Rockets
- Season MVP: (China) Sun Jun
- Promoted to Second Division: Sichuan Pandas; Jilin Northeast Tigers; Beijing Olympians
- Relegated to Second Division: Ji'nan Army; Sichuan Pandas

Playoffs

Finals
- Champions: Bayi Rockets
- Runners-up: Liaoning Hunters

CBA seasons
- ← 1997–98 1999–2000 →

The 1998–99 CBA season was the fourth season of the Chinese Basketball Association.

The season ran from December 27, 1998, to April 25, 1999.

The Air Force team withdrew from the league before the season got underway, so three clubs were promoted from the Second Division. The Sichuan Pandas, originally relegated at the end of the previous campaign, earned a reprieve. They were joined by the Jilin Northeast Tigers and Beijing Olympians.

== Regular season standings ==
These are the final standings for the 1998-99 CBA regular season.

#	1998–99 CBA season							
#	Team	W	L	PCT	GB	Home	Road	Tiebreaker
1	Bayi Rockets	21	1	.955	-	11–0	10–1	
2	Liaoning Hunters	15	7	.682	6	9–2	6–5	
3	Guangdong Southern Tigers	13	9	.591	8	7–4	6–5	GD: 3-1; SD: 2-2; BO: 1-3
4	Shandong Flaming Bulls	13	9	.591	8	9–2	4–7	GD: 3-1; SD: 2-2; BO: 1-3
5	Beijing Olympians	13	9	.591	8	7–4	6–5	GD: 3-1; SD: 2-2; BO: 1-3
6	Shanghai Sharks	12	10	.545	9	8–3	4–7	
7	Beijing Ducks	11	11	.500	10	7–4	4–7	
8	Zhejiang Squirrels	10	12	.455	11	5–6	5–6	
9	Sichuan Pandas	9	13	.409	12	7–4	2–9	
10	Jilin Northeast Tigers	8	14	.364	13	8–3	0–11	
11	Jiangsu Dragons	5	17	.227	16	4–7	1–10	
12	Ji'nan Army	2	20	.091	19	2–9	0–11	

Key to colors
Top 8 teams advance to the Playoffs
Bottom 4 teams advance to the Relegation Round

== Playoffs ==
The top 8 teams in the regular season advanced to the playoffs.

For the first time, the semifinals used best-of-five series to determine the advancing team.

In the Finals, the Bayi Rockets defeated the Liaoning Hunters (3-0), claiming their fourth straight CBA championship.

Teams in bold advanced to the next round. The numbers to the left of each team indicate the team's seeding in regular season, and the numbers to the right indicate the number of games the team won in that round. Home court advantage belongs to the team with the better regular season record; teams enjoying the home advantage are shown in italics.

Quarterfinals; Best of 3
1	**Bayi Rockets**	**2**
8	Zhejiang Squirrels	0
4	Shandong Flaming Bulls	0
5	**Beijing Olympians**	**2**
2	**Liaoning Hunters**	**2**
7	Beijing Ducks	0
3	**Guangdong Southern Tigers**	**2**
6	Shanghai Sharks	1

Semifinals; Best of 5
1	**Bayi Rockets**	**3**
5	Beijing Olympians	0
2	**Liaoning Hunters**	**3**
3	Guangdong Southern Tigers	0

Finals; Best of 5
1	**Bayi Rockets**	**3**
2	Liaoning Hunters	0

== Relegations ==
The bottom 4 teams played the relegation phase by round-robin.

The Ji'nan Army and Sichuan Pandas were relegated to the Second Division.

Team	W	L	PF	PA	PD
Jilin Northeast Tigers	6	0	649	574	+75
Jiangsu Dragons	2	4	590	649	−59
Ji'nan Army	1	5	575	630	−55
Sichuan Pandas (Note: A decision was made post-season on May 19, 1999. Sichuan was relegated for cheating on timer and scoring in two regular season games respectively. Sichuan was made the last place officially.)	3	3	670	631	+39

Key to colors
Bottom 2 teams relegated to the Second Division

	JS	JL	JA	SC
Jiangsu Dragons	–	92-100	108-98	120-111
Jilin Northeast Tigers	100-92	–	109-87	117-103
Ji'nan Army	108-85	92-112	–	101-109
Sichuan Pandas	132-93	108-111	107-89	–

== CBA Awards ==
These are the award winners for the 1998-99 CBA regular season.

- CBA Most Valuable Player: Sun Jun (Jilin Northeast Tigers)

== See also ==
- Chinese Basketball Association
