= 2001–02 Chinese Basketball Association season =

2001–02 CBA season
- League: Chinese Basketball Association
- Sport: Basketball
- Duration: December 8, 2001 – April 19, 2002
- TV partner(s): CCTV-5; STAR Sports and local channels

Regular Season
- Season champions: Shanghai Sharks
- Season MVP: (China) Liu Yudong
- Promoted to Second Division: Shaanxi Kylins; Shenzhen Leopards
- Relegated to Second Division: Beijing Olympians; Shenzhen Leopards

Playoffs

Finals
- Champions: Shanghai Sharks
- Runners-up: Bayi Rockets
- Finals MVP: (China) Liu Yudong

CBA seasons
- ← 2000–01 2002–03 →

The 2001–02 CBA season is the seventh CBA season.

The season ran from December 8, 2001, to April 19, 2002. Shaanxi Kylins and Shenzhen Leopards were promoted from the Second Division. Taiwanese club Sina Lions joined CBA in this season.

== Regular season standings ==
#	2001–02 CBA season							
#	Team	W	L	PCT	GB	Home	Road	Tiebreaker
1	Shanghai Sharks	23	1	.958	-	12–0	11–1	
2	Bayi Rockets	17	7	.708	6	12–0	5–7	
3	Beijing Ducks	15	9	.625	8	9–3	6–6	BJ 1-1(217–211) JL
4	Jilin Northeast Tigers	15	9	.625	8	10–2	5–7	BJ 1-1(217–211) JL
5	Shandong Flaming Bulls	14	10	.583	9	10–2	4–8	
6	Zhejiang Cyclones	13	11	.542	10	9–3	4–8	
7	Guangdong Southern Tigers	12	12	.500	11	8–4	4–8	
8	Sina Lions	11	13	.458	12	8–4	3–9	SL 2-0 JS
9	Jiangsu Dragons	11	13	.458	12	8–4	3–9	SL 2-0 JS
10	Shaanxi Kylins	10	14	.417	13	8–4	2–10	
11	Beijing Olympians	8	16	.333	15	4–8	4–8	
12	Liaoning Hunters	7	17	.292	16	6–6	1–11	
13	Shenzhen Leopards	0	24	.000	23	0–12	0–12	

Key to colors
Top 8 teams advance to the Playoffs
Bottom 4 teams advance to the Relegation Round

== Playoffs ==
The top 8 teams in the regular season advanced to the playoffs. For the first time, the quarterfinals used best-of-five series to determine the advancing team.

In the Final series, Shanghai Sharks defeated Bayi Rockets (3–1), snapped a series of 6 consecutive championships for the Bayi.

Teams in bold advanced to the next round. The numbers to the left of each team indicate the team's seeding in regular season, and the numbers to the right indicate the number of games the team won in that round. Home court advantage belongs to the team with the better regular season record; teams enjoying the home advantage are shown in italics.

Quarterfinals; Best of 5
1	**Shanghai Sharks**	**3**
7	Guangdong Southern Tigers	0
4	**Jilin Northeast Tigers**	**3**
6	Zhejiang Cyclones	2
2	**Bayi Rockets**	**3**
8	Sina Lions	1
3	Beijing Ducks	1
5	**Shandong Flaming Bulls**	**3**

Semifinals; Best of 5
1	**Shanghai Sharks**	**3**
4	Jilin Northeast Tigers	0
2	**Bayi Rockets**	**3**
5	Shandong Flaming Bulls	0

Finals; Best of 5
1	**Shanghai Sharks**	**3**
2	Bayi Rockets	1

== Relegations ==
The bottom 4 teams played the relegation round by round-robin.

Beijing Olympians and Shenzhen Leopards were relegated to the Second Division.

Team	W	L	PF	PA	PD
Liaoning Hunters	5	1	655	561	+94
Shaanxi Kylins	4	2	660	575	+85
Beijing Olympians	3	3	620	594	+26
Shenzhen Leopards	0	6	585	790	−205

Key to colors
Bottom 2 teams relegated to the Second Division

	BO	LN	SX	SZ
Beijing Olympians	–	85-93	96-88	130-107
Liaoning Hunters	99-85	–	114-101	126-84
Shaanxi Kylins	105-96	104-79	–	139-88
Shenzhen Leopards	102-128	102-144	102-123	–

== See also ==
- Chinese Basketball Association
