= 1999–2000 Chinese Basketball Association season =

1999–2000 CBA season
- League: Chinese Basketball Association
- Sport: Basketball
- Duration: November 21, 1999 – March 19, 2000
- TV partner(s): CCTV-5

Regular Season
- Season champions: Bayi Rockets
- Season MVP: (China) Wang Zhizhi
- Promoted to Second Division: Nanjing Army Thunder; Hubei Mailyard
- Relegated to Second Division: Nanjing Army Thunder; Hubei Mailyard

Playoffs

Finals
- Champions: Bayi Rockets
- Runners-up: Shanghai Sharks
- Finals MVP: (China) Wang Zhizhi

CBA seasons
- ← 1998–99 2000–01 →

The 1999–2000 CBA season was the fifth CBA season.

The season ran from November 21, 1999, to March 19, 2000. Nanjing Army Thunder and Hubei Mailyard were promoted from the Second Division. Vanguard from the Second Division was merged with Beijing Olympians and the club was known as Vanguard Beijing Olympians for the next several seasons.

== Regular season standings ==
#	1999–2000 CBA season							
#	Team	W	L	PCT	GB	Home	Road	Tiebreaker
1	Bayi Rockets	21	1	.955	–	11–0	10–1	
2	Guangdong Southern Tigers	15	7	.682	6	10–1	5–6	
3	Shanghai Sharks	14	8	.636	7	8–3	6–5	
4	Shandong Flaming Bulls	13	9	.591	8	9–2	4–7	SD 1–1 (169–161) BJ
5	Beijing Ducks	13	9	.591	8	10–1	3–8	SD 1–1 (169–161) BJ
6	Vanguard Beijing Olympians	12	10	.545	9	9–2	3–8	VB 3–1; LN 2–2; JS 1–3
7	Liaoning Hunters	12	10	.545	9	6–5	6–5	VB 3–1; LN 2–2; JS 1–3
8	Jiangsu Dragons	12	10	.545	9	7–4	5–6	VB 3–1; LN 2–2; JS 1–3
9	Jilin Northeast Tigers	10	12	.455	11	8–3	2–9	
10	Zhejiang Cyclones	8	14	.364	13	6–5	2–9	
11	Nanjing Army Thunder	1	21	.091	20	1–10	0–11	NA 1–1 (197–185) HB
12	Hubei Mailyard	1	21	.091	20	1–10	0–11	NA 1–1 (197–185) HB

Key to colors
Top 8 teams advance to the Playoffs
Bottom 4 teams advance to the Relegation Round

== Playoffs ==
The top 8 teams in the regular season advanced to the playoffs.

In the Final series, Bayi Rockets defeated Shanghai Sharks (3-0), and claimed its 5th straight CBA championship.

Teams in bold advanced to the next round. The numbers to the left of each team indicate the team's seeding in regular season, and the numbers to the right indicate the number of games the team won in that round. Home court advantage belongs to the team with the better regular season record; teams enjoying the home advantage are shown in italics.

Quarterfinals; Best of 3
1	**Bayi Rockets**	**2**
8	Jiangsu Dragons	0
4	**Shandong Flaming Bulls**	**2**
6	Vanguard Beijing Olympians	0
2	**Guangdong Southern Tigers**	**2**
7	Liaoning Hunters	1
3	**Shanghai Sharks**	**2**
5	Beijing Ducks	0

Semifinals; Best of 5
1	**Bayi Rockets**	**3**
4	Shandong Flaming Bulls	0
2	Guangdong Southern Tigers	1
3	**Shanghai Sharks**	**3**

Finals; Best of 5
1	**Bayi Rockets**	**3**
3	Shanghai Sharks	0

== Relegations ==
The bottom 4 teams played the relegation round by round-robin.

Nanjing Army Thunder and Hubei Mailyard were relegated to the Second Division.

Team	W	L	PF	PA	PD
Zhejiang Cyclones	5	1	665	596	+69
Jilin Northeast Tigers	4	2	656	602	+54
Hubei Mailyard	2	4	563	620	−57
Nanjing Army Thunder	1	5	546	612	−66

Key to colors
Bottom 2 teams relegated to the Second Division

	HB	JL	NA	ZJ
Hubei Mailyard	–	97-86	74-70	96-101
Jilin Northeast Tigers	136-108	–	114-93	117-114
Nanjing Army Thunder	107-81	94-109	–	97-114
Zhejiang Cyclones	120-107	96-94	120-85	–

== See also ==
- Chinese Basketball Association
