= 2000–01 Chinese Basketball Association season =

2000–01 CBA season
- League: Chinese Basketball Association
- Sport: Basketball
- Duration: November 18, 2000 – March 18, 2001
- TV partner: CCTV-5

Regular Season
- Season champions: Bayi Rockets
- Season MVP: (China) Yao Ming
- Promoted to Second Division: Ji'nan Army; Shenyang Army
- Relegated to Second Division: Ji'nan Army; Shenyang Army

Playoffs

Finals
- Champions: Bayi Rockets
- Runners-up: Shanghai Sharks
- Finals MVP: (China) Yao Ming

CBA seasons
- ← 1999–2000 2001–02 →

The 2000–01 CBA season is the sixth CBA season.

The season ran from November 18, 2000 to March 18, 2001. Ji'nan Army and Shenyang Army were promoted from the Second Division.

== Regular season standings ==
#	2000–01 CBA season							
#	Team	W	L	PCT	GB	Home	Road	Tiebreaker
1	Bayi Rockets	18	4	.818	-	11–0	7–4	BY 1-1(213-192) SH
2	Shanghai Sharks	18	4	.818	-	11–0	7–4	BY 1-1(213-192) SH
3	Beijing Ducks	14	8	.636	4	9–2	5–6	BJ 1-1(212-197) JL
4	Jilin Northeast Tigers	14	8	.636	4	10–1	4–7	BJ 1-1(212-197) JL
5	Liaoning Hunters	12	10	.545	6	9–2	3–8	LN 2-0 GD
6	Guangdong Southern Tigers	12	10	.545	6	8–3	4–7	LN 2-0 GD
7	Vanguard Beijing Olympians	11	11	.500	7	9–2	2–9	
8	Jiangsu Dragons	10	12	.455	8	8–3	2–9	JS 1-1(197-190) SD
9	Shandong Flaming Bulls	10	12	.455	8	9–2	1–10	JS 1-1(197-190) SD
10	Zhejiang Cyclones	7	15	.318	11	5–6	2–9	
11	Ji'nan Army	6	16	.273	12	4–7	2–9	
12	Shenyang Army	0	22	.000	18	0–11	0–11	

Key to colors
Top 8 teams advance to the Playoffs
Bottom 4 teams advance to the Relegation Round

== Playoffs ==
The top 8 teams in the regular season advanced to the playoffs.

In the Final series, Bayi Rockets defeated Shanghai Sharks (3-1), and claimed its 6th straight CBA championship.

Teams in bold advanced to the next round. The numbers to the left of each team indicate the team's seeding in regular season, and the numbers to the right indicate the number of games the team won in that round. Home court advantage belongs to the team with the better regular season record; teams enjoying the home advantage are shown in italics.

Quarterfinals; Best of 3
1	**Bayi Rockets**	**2**
8	Jiangsu Dragons	0
4	**Jilin Northeast Tigers**	**2**
5	Liaoning Hunters	1
2	**Shanghai Sharks**	**2**
7	Vanguard Beijing Olympians	1
3	**Beijing Ducks**	**2**
6	Guangdong Southern Tigers	0

Semifinals; Best of 5
1	**Bayi Rockets**	**3**
4	Jilin Northeast Tigers	0
2	**Shanghai Sharks**	**3**
3	Beijing Ducks	0

Finals; Best of 5
1	**Bayi Rockets**	**3**
2	Shanghai Sharks	1

== Relegations ==
The bottom 4 teams played the relegation round by round-robin.

Ji'nan Army and Shenyang Army were relegated to the Second Division.

Team	W	L	PF	PA	PD
Zhejiang Cyclones	5	1	663	577	+86
Shandong Flaming Bulls	5	1	648	569	+79
Ji'nan Army	1	5	560	628	−68
Shenyang Army	1	5	541	638	−97

Key to colors
Bottom 2 teams relegated to the Second Division

	JA	SD	SA	ZJ
Ji'nan Army	–	92-109	92-73	91-99
Shandong Flaming Bulls	102-90	–	113-83	101-86
Shenyang Army	127-100	92-99	–	84-101
Zhejiang Cyclones	118-95	126-124	133-82	–

== See also ==
- Chinese Basketball Association
