= Shanghai Sharks =

Basketball team based in Shanghai, China

- Nickname: 上海久事大鲨鱼
- Leagues: CBA
- Founded: 1996; 30 years ago
- History: Shanghai Sharks (1996–present)
- Arena: Shanghai Indoor Stadium
- Capacity: 13,000
- Location: Shanghai, China
- Team colors: Orange, blue, white
- Head coach: Lu Wei
- Ownership: Shanghai Jiushi Group
- Championships: 2 (2002, 2026)
- Retired numbers: 2 (8, 15)
Home	Away	Third

Shanghai Sharks
- Traditional Chinese: 上海大鯊魚
- Simplified Chinese: 上海大鲨鱼
Transcriptions
Standard Mandarin
- Hanyu Pinyin: Shànghǎi dàshāyú
- Wade–Giles: Shanghai tashayü
Yue: Cantonese
- Yale Romanization: Seung hoi2 daai6 sa1 yu2
- Jyutping: Seong hoi2 daai6 saa1 jyu4

The Shanghai Sharks (simplified Chinese: 上海久事大鲨鱼; traditional Chinese: 上海久事大鯊魚; pinyin: Shànghǎi Jǐushì Dàshāyú), officially named Shanghai Juss Basketball Club Co., Ltd, are a Chinese professional basketball team based in Shanghai. The team competes in the Chinese Basketball Association (CBA), the highest tier. The team is perhaps best known for, and tied in many ways to, Yao Ming, who helped the team achieve their greatest successes first a player, and later as an owner.

In August 1979, the Sharks played the Washington Bullets, the first NBA team to travel to China, with Yao Zhiyuan—father of Yao Ming—as their center. Decades later, having developed Yao Ming before he entered the National Basketball Association (NBA), Yao was the driving force behind their three consecutive appearances in the CBA finals (1999–2000, 2000–01, and 2001–02), facing the Bayi Rockets each time. The Sharks were runners-up the first two years, but won their first CBA title on their third attempt, breaking the Rockets' streak of six consecutive championships.

The team faced serious financial issues in the 2008–09 season, and were in danger of not being able to compete in the following season. On July 16, 2009, Chinese media reported that Yao Ming had stepped in to purchase the team. In the 2021–22 season, under Li Chunjiang, the Sharks experienced a high bested only by the Yao era, reinvigorating their place among China's best basketball teams.

More recently the Sharks became an Internet meme as a future landing spot for high-profile NBA stars who underperform in a game or series, particularly in the playoffs. Kyle Kuzma, Ben Simmons, Dillon Brooks, and Russell Westbrook were prominent victims of such jokes.

== Honours ==
CBA
Champions (2): 2001–02, 2025–26
Runners-up (2): 1999–2000, 2000–01

CBA Club Cup
Champions (2): 2024–25, 2025–26

Merlion Cup
Winners (1): 2016

== Players ==
=== Roster ===
Note: Flags indicate national team eligibility at FIBA-sanctioned events. Players may hold other non-FIBA nationalities not displayed.

Shanghai Sharks roster
Players
Coaches

Pos.	No.	Nat.	Name	Ht.	Wt.
PG	0	(United States)	Brandon Goodwin	1.83 m (6 ft 0 in)	81 kg (179 lb)
PG	1	(China)	Li Tianrong	1.92 m (6 ft 4 in)	86 kg (190 lb)
PG	3	(China)	Yuan Tangwen	1.85 m (6 ft 1 in)	82 kg (181 lb)
G/F	5	(Chinese Taipei)	Liu Cheng	1.95 m (6 ft 5 in)	87 kg (192 lb)
PG	7	(China)	Ding Jiaru	1.90 m (6 ft 3 in)	73 kg (161 lb)
C	9	(China)	Yan Pengfei	2.11 m (6 ft 11 in)	120 kg (265 lb)
G	10	(China)	Xie Liyongwei	1.96 m (6 ft 5 in)	88 kg (194 lb)
C	11	(United States)	JaVale McGee	2.13 m (7 ft 0 in)	122 kg (269 lb)
PF	12	(China)	Ma Diancheng	2.03 m (6 ft 8 in)	95 kg (209 lb)
F	13	(China)	Li Xiangyu	2.10 m (6 ft 11 in)	87 kg (192 lb)
F	14	(China)	Li Hongquan	1.98 m (6 ft 6 in)	102 kg (225 lb)
C	17	(China)	Guo Fengwei	2.20 m (7 ft 3 in)	100 kg (220 lb)
F	18	(China)	Wang Qingshan	2.02 m (6 ft 8 in)	98 kg (216 lb)
PG	23	(United States)	D'Angelo Russell	1.91 m (6 ft 3 in)	88 kg (194 lb)
G	25	(China)	Cui Xiaolong	1.93 m (6 ft 4 in)	87 kg (192 lb)
PF	32	(China)	Liu Lijia	2.06 m (6 ft 9 in)	102 kg (225 lb)
F	77	(China)	Kevin Zhang	2.05 m (6 ft 9 in)	103 kg (227 lb)
C	94	(China)	Wang Zhelin	2.14 m (7 ft 0 in)	120 kg (265 lb)

Head coach

- (China) Lu Wei

Assistant coach(es)

- (China) Wang Yong

Legend

- (C) Team captain
- Injured

- Roster
Updated: November 20, 2026

== Sponsorship ==
As of 2025, the team's jersey sponsor has been the Chinese sportswear brand Li-Ning.

== Notable players ==
Players included in this section are considered notable for having achieved at least one of the following:

- Set a club record while playing for the Sharks
- Won an individual award as a professional player
- Played at least one official international match for their senior national team
- Been ranked higher than Carmelo Anthony and LeBron James at any point in their careers (e.g., Lenny Cooke in 2001)

The following players meet at least one of the above criteria:

- (China) Wang Zhelin
- (China) Yao Ming
- (China) Liu Wei
- (United States) Jamaal Franklin
- (United States) Ray McCallum Jr.
- (Chinese Taipei) Yen Hsing-su
- (United States) Jimmer Fredette
- (United States) Kenny Lofton Jr.
- (United States) Lenny Cooke
- (United States) Hassan Whiteside
