= Bayi Rockets =

Bayi Rockets 八一双鹿电池火箭
- League: CBA
- Founded: 1955; 71 years ago
- Folded: 2020; 6 years ago
- History: Bayi Basketball Team (1955–1995); Bayi Rockets (1995–2020)
- Arena: Nanchang International Sports Center
- Capacity: 11,000
- Location: Nanchang, Jiangxi, China
- Team colors: Red, Yellow, White
- Main sponsor: Shuanglu Batteries
- Head coach: Wang Zhizhi
- Ownership: People's Liberation Army
- Championships: 8 (1996, 1997, 1998, 1999, 2000, 2001, 2003, 2007)
Home	Away	Third

Bayi Rockets
- Simplified Chinese: 八一双鹿电池火箭
- Traditional Chinese: 八一雙鹿電池火箭
Transcriptions
Standard Mandarin
- Hanyu Pinyin: Bāyī Shuānglù Diànchí Huǒjiàn
- Wade–Giles: Pai Shuang-lu Tien-ch'ih Huo-chien
Yue: Cantonese
- Yale Romanization: Baat3 yat1 Seung luk6 Din6 chi4 Fo2 jin3
- Jyutping: Baat3 jat1 Soeng luk6 Din6 ci4 Fo2 zin3

The Bayi Rockets (Chinese: 八一双鹿电池火箭; pinyin: Bāyī Shuānglù Diànchí Huǒjiàn) were a professional basketball team based in Nanchang, Jiangxi, China, which played in the South Division of the Chinese Basketball Association. The Rockets were the only CBA team owned and governed by the People's Liberation Army (PLA).

On 20 October 2020, The Chinese Basketball Association announced that the Rockets had withdrawn from Chinese Basketball Association (CBA) following a decision by the PLA.

== History ==
The Bayi Rockets were founded in 1955 in Ningbo, Zhejiang. The team's founding members served in the People's Liberation Army, and the "Bayi" in its name represents the anniversary of the founding of the PLA, 1 August. There are also several other army clubs using the Bayi name in other sports leagues, including Bayi Kylin in the WCBA, the men's soccer team Bayi Zhengbang, and the women's soccer club Bayi Xiangtan.

In August 1979, the Bayi Rockets played the Washington Bullets, when the Bullets became the first NBA team to travel to China. The Bayi Rockets lost.

The Bayi Rockets have a long history that predates the current CBA. When they entered the league in its inaugural season of 1995–96, they had already won 34 national titles. They had also held a friendly international competition against the Washington Bullets (now Washington Wizards) during the 1970s. Bayi dominated the CBA in its early years, winning seven championships in the first eight seasons of CBA competition, including the first six titles in the league's existence. During the first five years of this legendary title run, the Rockets were undefeated in playoff games.

The Rockets also had a home-game unbeaten streak of 65 games that ended in 2002. But in recent years, other CBA teams have become more competitive, and Bayi would only win one more championship after its initial spree of success, with that title coming in the 2006–07 CBA season.

During the 2004–05 CBA season, the Bayi Rockets finished in third place in the South Division and defeated the Beijing Ducks in the Quarter-Finals of the CBA Playoffs, but lost in the Semi-Finals to the reigning titleholders, the Guangdong Southern Tigers. This defeat marked the first time since the league's founding that the team did not advance to the CBA Finals, and the only time in the organization's first 12 years that the club failed to reach the championship series.

The 2008–09 CBA season marked the first year that the Bayi Rockets failed to make the playoffs. After two first-round playoff exits in 2009–10 and 2010–11, the club has not made it back to the playoffs, and have become one of the worst teams in the league.

In 2018, the Bayi Rockets moved from Ningbo to their current location in Nanchang, Jiangxi.

In the 2019–20 season, Bayi ranked last in the CBA with a 6–40 record.

In May 2020, the People Liberation's Army announced that it had decided to withdraw the Rockets and Bayi Kylin from the CBA. They had not showed up in their opening game of the 2020–21 season before the announcement.

To continue the legacy left behind by the Bayi Rockets, a new team joined the CBA, relocating back to Ningbo again after a 3-year hiatus and were known as the Ningbo Rockets. The new team commenced playing in the 2021–22 CBA season.

== Honours ==
- Chinese Basketball Association

CBA Playoff Champions (8): 1995–96, 1996–97, 1997–98, 1998–99, 1999–00, 2000–01, 2002–03, 2006–07
CBA Playoff Runners-Up (3): 2001–02, 2003–04, 2005–06
CBA Regular Season Winners (6): 1995–96, 1996–97, 1998–99, 1999–2000, 2000–01, 2006–07
CBA Regular Season Second Place (5): 1997–98, 2001–02, 2002–03, 2005–06 (South Division), 2006–07
CBA Regular Season Third Place (2): 2003–04, 2004–05 (South Division)

== See also ==
PLA Military Sports Training Center
