= 2009 FIBA Asia Championship squads =

These are the team rosters of the 16 teams competing in the 2009 FIBA Asia Championship.

== Group A ==
=== Japan ===
Head coach: Osamu Kuraishi

#	Pos	Name	Club	Date of Birth	Height
4	G	Yusuke Okada	(Japan) Toyota Alvark	17 September 1984 (aged 24)	1.85 m (6 ft 1 in)
5	F	Daiji Yamada	(Japan) Rera Kamuy Hokkaido	8 June 1981 (aged 28)	2.00 m (6 ft 6 1/2 in)
6	G	Ryota Sakurai	(Japan) Rera Kamuy Hokkaido	13 March 1983 (aged 26)	1.94 m (6 ft 4 1/2 in)
7	G	Kei Igarashi	(Japan) Toyota Alvark	7 May 1980 (aged 29)	1.80 m (5 ft 11 in)
8	G	Shinsuke Kashiwagi	(Japan) Aisin Seahorses	22 December 1981 (aged 27)	1.83 m (6 ft 0 in)
9	G	Takehiko Orimo	(Japan) Rera Kamuy Hokkaido	14 May 1970 (aged 39)	1.90 m (6 ft 3 in)
10	F	Kosuke Takeuchi	(Japan) Aisin Seahorses	29 January 1985 (aged 24)	2.05 m (6 ft 8 1/2 in)
11	F	Tomoo Amino	(Japan) Aisin Seahorses	25 September 1980 (aged 28)	1.96 m (6 ft 5 in)
12	F	Ken Takeda	(Japan) Link Tochigi Brex	5 October 1978 (aged 30)	1.88 m (6 ft 2 in)
14	C	Shunsuke Ito	(Japan) Link Tochigi Brex	27 June 1979 (aged 30)	2.04 m (6 ft 8 1/2 in)
15	F	Joji Takeuchi	(Japan) Hitachi SunRockers	29 January 1985 (aged 24)	2.05 m (6 ft 8 1/2 in)

=== South Korea ===
Head coach: Hur Jae

#	Pos	Name	Club	Date of Birth	Height
4	F	Bang Sung-yoon	(South Korea) Seoul SK Knights	3 June 1982 (aged 27)	1.97 m (6 ft 5 1/2 in)
5	G	Lee Jung-suk	(South Korea) Seoul Samsung Thunders	6 July 1982 (aged 27)	1.85 m (6 ft 1 in)
6	F	Kang Byung-hyun	(South Korea) Incheon ET Land Black Slamer	3 March 1985 (aged 24)	1.92 m (6 ft 3 1/2 in)
7	G	Yang Dong-geun	(South Korea) Ulsan Mobis Phoebus	14 September 1981 (aged 27)	1.83 m (6 ft 0 in)
8	F	Lee Kyu-sup	(South Korea) Seoul Samsung Thunders	13 November 1977 (aged 31)	1.98 m (6 ft 6 in)
9	G	Joo Hee-jung	(South Korea) Anyang KT&G Kites	4 February 1977 (aged 32)	1.82 m (5 ft 11 1/2 in)
10	F	Lee Dong-jun	(South Korea) Daegu Orions	29 January 1980 (aged 29)	2.00 m (6 ft 6 1/2 in)
11	C	Kim Joo-sung	(South Korea) Wonju Dongbu Promy	9 November 1979 (aged 29)	2.05 m (6 ft 8 1/2 in)
12	F	Yang Hee-jong	(South Korea) Anyang KT&G Kites	11 May 1984 (aged 25)	1.94 m (6 ft 4 1/2 in)
13	C	Oh Se-keun	(South Korea) Chung-Ang University	20 May 1987 (aged 22)	2.00 m (6 ft 6 1/2 in)
14	C	Ha Seung-jin	(South Korea) Jeonju KCC Egis	4 August 1985 (aged 24)	2.21 m (7 ft 3 in)
15	F	Kim Min-soo	(South Korea) Seoul SK Knights	16 January 1982 (aged 27)	2.00 m (6 ft 6 1/2 in)

=== Philippines ===
Head coach: Yeng Guiao

#	Pos	Name	Club	Date of Birth	Height
4	G	Jared Dillinger	(Philippines) Talk 'N Text Tropang Texters	6 January 1984 (aged 25)	1.96 m (6 ft 5 in)
5	F	Kerby Raymundo	(Philippines) Purefoods Tender Juicy Giants	19 January 1981 (aged 28)	2.01 m (6 ft 7 in)
6	G	James Yap	(Philippines) Purefoods Tender Juicy Giants	15 February 1982 (aged 27)	1.91 m (6 ft 3 in)
7	F	Sonny Thoss	(Philippines) Alaska Aces	12 December 1981 (aged 27)	2.03 m (6 ft 8 in)
8	C	Asi Taulava	(Philippines) Coca-Cola Tigers	2 March 1973 (aged 36)	2.08 m (6 ft 10 in)
9	F	Japeth Aguilar	(United States) Western Kentucky	25 January 1987 (aged 22)	2.10 m (6 ft 10 1/2 in)
10	G	Gabe Norwood	(Philippines) Rain or Shine Elasto Painters	9 February 1985 (aged 24)	1.98 m (6 ft 6 in)
11	G	Willie Miller	(Philippines) Alaska Aces	13 July 1977 (aged 32)	1.83 m (6 ft 0 in)
12	F	Mick Pennisi	(Philippines) San Miguel Beermen	13 March 1975 (aged 34)	2.11 m (6 ft 11 in)
13	G	Jayjay Helterbrand	(Philippines) Barangay Ginebra Kings	14 October 1976 (aged 32)	1.83 m (6 ft 0 in)
14	G	Cyrus Baguio	(Philippines) Barangay Ginebra Kings	19 August 1980 (aged 28)	1.88 m (6 ft 2 in)
15	G	Arwind Santos	(Philippines) San Miguel Beermen	10 June 1981 (aged 28)	1.93 m (6 ft 4 in)

=== Sri Lanka ===
Head coach: Ajit Kuruppu

#	Pos	Name	Club	Date of Birth	Height
4	G	Thissara Chathuranga	(Sri Lanka) Sampath Bank	3 November 1985 (aged 23)	1.77 m (5 ft 9 1/2 in)
5	G	Duke Rajapakse	(Sri Lanka) Dialog Telecom	27 October 1976 (aged 32)	1.76 m (5 ft 9 1/2 in)
6	F	Roshan Randima	(Sri Lanka) Delmege	24 November 1981 (aged 27)	1.80 m (5 ft 11 in)
7	G	Hendahewa Yasarathna	(Sri Lanka) Dialog Telecom	17 April 1986 (aged 23)	1.78 m (5 ft 10 in)
8	G	Prageeth Pushpakumara	(Sri Lanka) NTB	25 May 1982 (aged 27)	1.76 m (5 ft 9 1/2 in)
9	F	Chamath Danawansa	(Sri Lanka) Sampath Bank	6 March 1983 (aged 26)	1.79 m (5 ft 10 1/2 in)
10	G	Shanaka Perera	(Sri Lanka) Delmege	31 March 1985 (aged 24)	1.67 m (5 ft 5 1/2 in)
11	C	Mithila Abeysekara	(Sri Lanka) Sampath Bank	4 November 1984 (aged 24)	1.96 m (6 ft 5 in)
12	C	Sidath Senanayake	(Sri Lanka) HNB	11 April 1988 (aged 21)	1.90 m (6 ft 3 in)
13	F	Jagath Kulatunga	(Sri Lanka) David Pieris	6 July 1978 (aged 31)	1.78 m (5 ft 10 in)
14	F	Roshan Fernando	(Sri Lanka) HNB	16 May 1988 (aged 21)	1.80 m (5 ft 11 in)
15	C	Jayakody Serasinghe	(Sri Lanka) DFCC	13 March 1986 (aged 23)	1.95 m (6 ft 5 in)

== Group B ==
=== Chinese Taipei ===
Head coach: (South Korea) Chung Kwang-Suk

#	Pos	Name	Club	Date of Birth	Height
4	G	Su I-chieh	(Chinese Taipei) Dacin Tigers	28 January 1987 (aged 22)	1.81 m (5 ft 11 1/2 in)
5	G	Yang Chin-min	(Chinese Taipei) Taiwan Beer	22 January 1984 (aged 25)	1.88 m (6 ft 2 in)
6	G	Lee Hsueh-lin	(Chinese Taipei) Yulon Dinos	31 January 1984 (aged 25)	1.75 m (5 ft 9 in)
7	G	Chang Chih-feng	(Chinese Taipei) Dacin Tigers	22 April 1981 (aged 28)	1.83 m (6 ft 0 in)
8	C	Wu Tai-hao	(Chinese Taipei) Taiwan Beer	7 February 1985 (aged 24)	2.02 m (6 ft 7 1/2 in)
9	F	Yang Che-yi	(Chinese Taipei) Yulon Dinos	20 October 1978 (aged 30)	1.93 m (6 ft 4 in)
10	G	Chang Tsung-hsien	(United States) BYU-Hawaii	27 December 1988 (aged 20)	1.90 m (6 ft 3 in)
11	C	Tseng Wen-ting	(Chinese Taipei) Yulon Dinos	6 July 1984 (aged 25)	2.02 m (6 ft 7 1/2 in)
12	F	Lin Chih-chieh	(Chinese Taipei) Taiwan Beer	11 June 1982 (aged 27)	1.92 m (6 ft 3 1/2 in)
13	F	Tien Lei	(Chinese Taipei) Dacin Tigers	1 June 1983 (aged 26)	2.02 m (6 ft 7 1/2 in)
14	F	Chen Tzu-wei	(Chinese Taipei) Dacin Tigers	30 January 1985 (aged 24)	2.00 m (6 ft 6 1/2 in)
15	F	Wu Chien-lung	(Chinese Taipei) Pure-Youth Construction	5 September 1988 (aged 20)	1.93 m (6 ft 4 in)

=== Iran ===
Head coach: (Serbia) Veselin Matić

#	Pos	Name	Club	Date of Birth	Height
4	F	Pouya Tajik	(Iran) BEEM Mazandaran	21 September 1980 (aged 28)	2.02 m (6 ft 7 1/2 in)
5	G	Amir Amini	(Iran) Azad University Tehran	10 June 1984 (aged 25)	1.91 m (6 ft 3 in)
6	G	Javad Davari	(Iran) Petrochimi Bandar Imam	25 April 1983 (aged 26)	1.86 m (6 ft 1 in)
7	G	Mehdi Kamrani	(Iran) Mahram Tehran	1 June 1982 (aged 27)	1.80 m (5 ft 11 in)
8	G	Aren Davoudi	(Iran) Zob Ahan Isfahan	12 July 1986 (aged 23)	1.80 m (5 ft 11 in)
9	F	Mohammad Reza Akbari	(Iran) Zob Ahan Isfahan	20 September 1986 (aged 22)	1.97 m (6 ft 5 1/2 in)
10	G	Hamed Afagh	(Iran) Saba Mehr Qazvin	1 February 1983 (aged 26)	1.94 m (6 ft 4 1/2 in)
11	F	Hamed Sohrabnejad	(Iran) Mahram Tehran	7 May 1983 (aged 26)	2.06 m (6 ft 9 in)
12	F	Oshin Sahakian	(Iran) Zob Ahan Isfahan	21 March 1986 (aged 23)	2.01 m (6 ft 7 in)
13	C	Ali Doraghi	(Iran) Louleh Sabz a.s Shiraz	20 September 1984 (aged 24)	2.11 m (6 ft 11 in)
14	F	Samad Nikkhah Bahrami	(Iran) Mahram Tehran	11 May 1983 (aged 26)	1.98 m (6 ft 6 in)
15	C	Hamed Haddadi	(United States) Memphis Grizzlies	19 May 1985 (aged 24)	2.18 m (7 ft 2 in)

=== Kuwait ===
Head coach: (Serbia) Zoran Krečković

#	Pos	Name	Club	Date of Birth	Height
4	G	Rashed Al-Rabah	Al-Kuwait	11 November 1987 (aged 21)	1.89 m (6 ft 2 1/2 in)
5	G	Abdulaziz Faleh Al-Fadhli	Al-Kuwait	26 March 1988 (aged 21)	1.88 m (6 ft 2 in)
6	G	Ahmed Safar	(Kuwait) Al-Yarmouk	17 August 1987 (aged 21)	1.83 m (6 ft 0 in)
7	C	Abdullah Towfiq	(Kuwait) Kazma	27 November 1988 (aged 20)	1.98 m (6 ft 6 in)
8	F	Abdulaziz Al-Hamidi	(Kuwait) Al-Qadsia	16 September 1987 (aged 21)	1.84 m (6 ft 1/2 in)
9	G	Ahmed Faleh Al-Fadhli	(Kuwait) Al-Sahel	26 March 1988 (aged 21)	1.80 m (5 ft 11 in)
10	G	Shayee Mohanna	(Kuwait) Al-Sahel	30 October 1986 (aged 22)	1.80 m (5 ft 11 in)
11	F	Mohammad Ashkanani	(Kuwait) Kazma	5 February 1984 (aged 25)	1.92 m (6 ft 3 1/2 in)
14	F	Hussain Al-Khabbaz	Al-Kuwait	6 January 1987 (aged 22)	1.94 m (6 ft 4 1/2 in)
15	C	Mohammad Al-Mutairi	(Kuwait) Al-Arabi	12 July 1980 (aged 29)	1.90 m (6 ft 3 in)

=== Uzbekistan ===
Head coach: Oleg Levin

#	Pos	Name	Club	Date of Birth	Height
4	G	Kirill Gusev		16 September 1990 (aged 18)	1.85 m (6 ft 1 in)
5	F	Hurmatjon Nuraliev		1 April 1981 (aged 28)	2.01 m (6 ft 7 in)
6	F	Artur Sharafutdinov		21 July 1990 (aged 19)	2.00 m (6 ft 6 1/2 in)
7	F	Timur Inileyev		23 February 1984 (aged 25)	1.97 m (6 ft 5 1/2 in)
8	G	Viacheslav Denisov		21 February 1983 (aged 26)	1.90 m (6 ft 3 in)
9	G	Evgeniy Shatrov		11 May 1986 (aged 23)	1.93 m (6 ft 4 in)
10	F	Ruslan Abdurahmanov		13 April 1976 (aged 33)	2.03 m (6 ft 8 in)
11	F	Samandar Juginisov		29 March 1987 (aged 22)	2.02 m (6 ft 7 1/2 in)
12	C	Aleksandr Yahin		24 February 1989 (aged 20)	2.06 m (6 ft 9 in)
13	F	Aleksandr Kozlov		24 September 1982 (aged 26)	2.02 m (6 ft 7 1/2 in)
14	G	Hasan Rahimov		20 December 1987 (aged 21)	1.75 m (5 ft 9 in)
15	C	Ildar Safarov		24 June 1985 (aged 24)	2.07 m (6 ft 9 1/2 in)

== Group C ==
=== China ===
Head coach: Guo Shiqiang

#	Pos	Name	Club	Date of Birth	Height
4	G	Hu Xuefeng	(China) Jiangsu Dragons	14 January 1980 (aged 29)	1.85 m (6 ft 1 in)
5	G	Liu Wei	(China) Shanghai Sharks	15 January 1980 (aged 29)	1.91 m (6 ft 3 in)
6	G	Zhang Qingpeng	(China) Liaoning Hunters	23 January 1985 (aged 24)	1.91 m (6 ft 3 in)
7	G	Wang Shipeng	(China) Guangdong Southern Tigers	6 April 1983 (aged 26)	1.98 m (6 ft 6 in)
8	F	Zhu Fangyu	(China) Guangdong Southern Tigers	5 January 1983 (aged 26)	2.01 m (6 ft 7 in)
9	G	Sun Yue	(United States) Los Angeles Lakers	6 November 1985 (aged 23)	2.06 m (6 ft 9 in)
10	F	Li Xiaoxu	(China) Liaoning Hunters	5 June 1990 (aged 19)	2.01 m (6 ft 7 in)
11	F	Yi Jianlian	(United States) New Jersey Nets	27 October 1987 (aged 21)	2.13 m (7 ft 0 in)
12	F	Wang Lei	(China) Bayi Rockets	12 August 1986 (aged 22)	2.01 m (6 ft 7 in)
13	C	Su Wei	(China) Guangdong Southern Tigers	28 July 1989 (aged 20)	2.11 m (6 ft 11 in)
14	C	Wang Zhizhi	(China) Bayi Rockets	8 July 1977 (aged 32)	2.16 m (7 ft 1 in)
15	F	Du Feng	(China) Guangdong Southern Tigers	30 July 1981 (aged 28)	2.06 m (6 ft 9 in)

=== India ===
Head coach: (Serbia) Aleksandar Bućan

#	Pos	Name	Club	Date of Birth	Height
4	G	Sambhaji Kadam		15 March 1980 (aged 29)	1.76 m (5 ft 9 1/2 in)
5	G	Talwinderjit Singh		20 October 1986 (aged 22)	1.85 m (6 ft 1 in)
6	G	Hareesh Koroth		12 November 1984 (aged 24)	1.86 m (6 ft 1 in)
7	C	Harpalsinh Vaghela		17 May 1985 (aged 24)	2.04 m (6 ft 8 1/2 in)
8	F	Sunil Kumar Rathee		25 March 1991 (aged 18)	1.95 m (6 ft 5 in)
9	F	Vishesh Bhriguvanshi		13 September 1991 (aged 17)	1.92 m (6 ft 3 1/2 in)
10	G	Prakash Mishra		5 August 1982 (aged 27)	1.80 m (5 ft 11 in)
11	C	Vineeth Revi Mathew		11 May 1984 (aged 25)	2.02 m (6 ft 7 1/2 in)
12	G	Abhilek Paul		2 June 1986 (aged 23)	1.80 m (5 ft 11 in)
13	G	Jayram Jat		7 September 1981 (aged 27)	1.90 m (6 ft 3 in)
14	F	C. V. Dinesh		14 May 1985 (aged 24)	1.93 m (6 ft 4 in)
15	F	Jagdeep Singh		10 January 1986 (aged 23)	1.96 m (6 ft 5 in)

=== Kazakhstan ===
Head coach: Vitaliy Strebkov

#	Pos	Name	Club	Date of Birth	Height
4	G	Berik Ismail		17 January 1990 (aged 19)	1.84 m (6 ft 1/2 in)
5	G	Ivan Nechayev	(Kazakhstan) Barsy Atyrau	9 December 1980 (aged 28)	1.80 m (5 ft 11 in)
6	C	Artyom Skornyakov	(Kazakhstan) Astana Tigers	28 August 1990 (aged 18)	2.12 m (6 ft 11 1/2 in)
7	C	Omirzak Akhmet	(Kazakhstan) Barsy Atyrau	20 August 1990 (aged 18)	2.05 m (6 ft 8 1/2 in)
8	F	Maxim Voyeikov	(Kazakhstan) Astana Tigers	13 September 1988 (aged 20)	1.95 m (6 ft 5 in)
9	G	Alexandr Tyutyunik	(Kazakhstan) Astana Tigers	5 July 1990 (aged 19)	1.98 m (6 ft 6 in)
10	G	Roman Muravyov	(Kazakhstan) BK Almaty	15 August 1984 (aged 24)	1.94 m (6 ft 4 1/2 in)
11	C	Anton Ponomarev	(Kazakhstan) Astana Tigers	31 October 1988 (aged 20)	2.07 m (6 ft 9 1/2 in)
12	G	Ilya Koptelov	(Kazakhstan) Astana Tigers	29 September 1988 (aged 20)	1.94 m (6 ft 4 1/2 in)
13	F	Rustam Yargaliyev	(Kazakhstan) Astana Tigers	20 December 1986 (aged 22)	1.94 m (6 ft 4 1/2 in)
14	F	Dmitriy Gavrilov	(Kazakhstan) Barsy Atyrau	27 November 1986 (aged 22)	2.00 m (6 ft 6 1/2 in)
15	C	Vsevolod Fadeikin	(Kazakhstan) BK Almaty	31 October 1985 (aged 23)	2.05 m (6 ft 8 1/2 in)

=== Qatar ===
Head coach: Ali Fakhroo

#	Pos	Name	Club	Date of Birth	Height
4	F	Baker Ahmad	(Qatar) Al-Jaish	11 August 1986 (aged 22)	2.01 m (6 ft 7 in)
5	G	Malek Saleem	(Qatar) Al-Rayyan	13 May 1985 (aged 24)	1.95 m (6 ft 5 in)
6	G	Saad Abdulrahman	(Qatar) Al-Sadd	2 May 1985 (aged 24)	1.93 m (6 ft 4 in)
7	G	Daoud Musa	Qatar SC	2 February 1982 (aged 27)	1.94 m (6 ft 4 1/2 in)
8	F	Khalid Suliman	(Qatar) Al-Sadd	7 February 1987 (aged 22)	1.98 m (6 ft 6 in)
9	F	Ali Turki	(Qatar) Al-Jaish	10 January 1982 (aged 27)	2.00 m (6 ft 6 1/2 in)
10	F	Yasseen Ismail	(Qatar) Al-Rayyan	12 August 1980 (aged 28)	2.03 m (6 ft 8 in)
11	F	Erfan Ali	Qatar SC	20 December 1983 (aged 25)	1.98 m (6 ft 6 in)
12	C	Mohammed Saleem	(Qatar) Al-Rayyan	17 July 1982 (aged 27)	2.01 m (6 ft 7 in)
13	F	Hammam Omer	(Qatar) Al-Wakrah	15 September 1983 (aged 25)	2.00 m (6 ft 6 1/2 in)
14	C	Mustafa El-Sayad	(United States) Bakersfield Jam	1 January 1982 (aged 27)	2.06 m (6 ft 9 in)
15	C	Omer Abdelqader	Qatar SC	1 October 1983 (aged 25)	2.05 m (6 ft 8 1/2 in)

== Group D ==
=== Indonesia ===
Head coach: Ronald Simanjuntak

#	Pos	Name	Club	Date of Birth	Height
4	G	Kelly Purwanto	(Indonesia) Garuda Flexi Bandung	3 August 1983 (aged 26)	1.78 m (5 ft 10 in)
5	F	Andi Poedjakesuma	(Indonesia) Pelita Jaya Esia Jakarta	8 November 1980 (aged 28)	1.87 m (6 ft 1 1/2 in)
6	G	Julius Christian Iroth	(Indonesia) Pelita Jaya Esia Jakarta	1 May 1982 (aged 27)	1.76 m (5 ft 9 1/2 in)
7	F	Ign Rusta Wijaya	(Indonesia) Pelita Jaya Esia Jakarta	22 March 1982 (aged 27)	1.87 m (6 ft 1 1/2 in)
8	G	Erick Christopher Sebayang	(Indonesia) Pelita Jaya Esia Jakarta	30 July 1983 (aged 26)	1.78 m (5 ft 10 in)
9	F	Samuel Kurniahu	(Indonesia) Pelita Jaya Esia Jakarta	19 August 1983 (aged 25)	1.86 m (6 ft 1 in)
10	F	Ary Chandra	(Indonesia) Pelita Jaya Esia Jakarta	10 November 1984 (aged 24)	1.80 m (5 ft 11 in)
11	G	Vavories Palopo	(Indonesia) Pelita Jaya Esia Jakarta	20 February 1984 (aged 25)	1.82 m (5 ft 11 1/2 in)
12	G	Haris Sogirin	(Indonesia) Pelita Jaya Esia Jakarta	1 October 1979 (aged 29)	1.82 m (5 ft 11 1/2 in)
13	C	Ponsianus Nyoman Indrawan	(Indonesia) Bima Sakti Nikko Steel Malang	13 August 1985 (aged 23)	1.90 m (6 ft 3 in)
14	C	Fidyandini	(Indonesia) Pelita Jaya Esia Jakarta	21 May 1983 (aged 26)	1.98 m (6 ft 6 in)
15	C	Isman Thoyib	(Indonesia) Aspac XL Jakarta	18 August 1984 (aged 24)	2.03 m (6 ft 8 in)

=== Jordan ===
Head coach: (Portugal) Mário Palma

#	Pos	Name	Club	Date of Birth	Height
4	G	Fadel Al-Najjar	(Jordan) Applied Science University	2 April 1985 (aged 24)	1.92 m (6 ft 3 1/2 in)
5	G	Rasheim Wright	(Turkey) TTNet Beykoz	21 July 1981 (aged 28)	1.91 m (6 ft 3 in)
6	F	Zaid Abbas	(Jordan) Applied Science University	21 November 1983 (aged 25)	2.03 m (6 ft 8 in)
7	G	Mousa Al-Awadi	(Jordan) Zain	20 July 1985 (aged 24)	1.92 m (6 ft 3 1/2 in)
8	F	Mohammad Hadrab	(Jordan) Zain	6 November 1984 (aged 24)	2.01 m (6 ft 7 in)
9	F	Enver Soobzokov	(Jordan) Zain	16 May 1978 (aged 31)	1.98 m (6 ft 6 in)
10	G	Sam Daghlas	(Jordan) Zain	18 September 1979 (aged 29)	1.99 m (6 ft 6 1/2 in)
11	G	Wesam Al-Sous	(Jordan) Aramex	24 February 1983 (aged 26)	1.83 m (6 ft 0 in)
12	F	Jamal Maaytah	(Jordan) Zain	24 February 1981 (aged 28)	2.13 m (7 ft 0 in)
13	C	Zaid Al-Khas	(Jordan) Zain	7 March 1976 (aged 33)	2.06 m (6 ft 9 in)
14	C	Islam Abbas	(Jordan) Applied Science University	11 March 1980 (aged 29)	2.00 m (6 ft 6 1/2 in)
15	C	Ayman Adais	(Jordan) Orthodox	28 June 1978 (aged 31)	2.08 m (6 ft 10 in)

=== Lebanon ===
Head coach: (Serbia) Dragan Raca

#	Pos	Name	Club	Date of Birth	Height
4	G	Jean Abdelnour	(Lebanon) Blue Stars	29 November 1983 (aged 25)	1.98 m (6 ft 6 in)
5	F	Jackson Vroman	(Iran) Saba Mehr Qazvin	6 June 1981 (aged 28)	2.05 m (6 ft 8 1/2 in)
6	G	Ali Mahmoud	(Lebanon) Al-Riyadi Beirut	28 May 1983 (aged 26)	1.82 m (5 ft 11 1/2 in)
7	G	Rony Fahed	(Lebanon) Sagesse	11 June 1981 (aged 28)	1.84 m (6 ft 1/2 in)
8	G	Omar El Turk	(Lebanon) Al-Riyadi Beirut	30 September 1981 (aged 27)	1.84 m (6 ft 1/2 in)
9	F	Brian Beshara	(Lebanon) Sagesse	30 December 1977 (aged 31)	2.04 m (6 ft 8 1/2 in)
10	C	Ali Kanaan	(United States) UMass Lowell	12 January 1985 (aged 24)	2.06 m (6 ft 9 in)
11	G	Rodrigue Akl	(Lebanon) Blue Stars	30 September 1988 (aged 20)	1.90 m (6 ft 3 in)
12	F	Daniel Faris	(United States) New Mexico Lobos	2 May 1987 (aged 22)	2.06 m (6 ft 9 in)
13	F	Matt Freije	(Puerto Rico) Criollos de Caguas	2 October 1981 (aged 27)	2.08 m (6 ft 10 in)
14	G	Mazen Mneimneh	(Lebanon) Al-Moutahed Tripoli	1 February 1986 (aged 23)	1.92 m (6 ft 3 1/2 in)
15	G	Fadi El Khatib	(Lebanon) Al-Riyadi Beirut	1 January 1979 (aged 30)	1.98 m (6 ft 6 in)

=== United Arab Emirates ===
Head coach: (Tunisia) Mounir Ben Slimane

#	Pos	Name	Club	Date of Birth	Height
4	G	Younis Khamis	(United Arab Emirates) Al-Wasl	23 July 1982 (aged 27)	1.85 m (6 ft 1 in)
5	C	Saeed Ashoor		18 June 1986 (aged 23)	2.04 m (6 ft 8 1/2 in)
6	G	Mohamed Al-Ajmani	(United Arab Emirates) Al-Ahli	6 October 1987 (aged 21)	1.82 m (5 ft 11 1/2 in)
7	G	Saleh Sultan		23 September 1989 (aged 19)	1.75 m (5 ft 9 in)
8	G	Hussain Ali		6 June 1989 (aged 20)	1.80 m (5 ft 11 in)
9	F	Ayoub Ahmed	(United Arab Emirates) Al-Wasl	29 January 1981 (aged 28)	1.90 m (6 ft 3 in)
10	F	Matar Al-Suwaidi	(United Arab Emirates) Al-Nasr	24 August 1986 (aged 22)	1.88 m (6 ft 2 in)
11	G	Talal Al-Nuaimi		26 September 1988 (aged 20)	1.80 m (5 ft 11 in)
12	G	Rashed Al-Zaabi	(United Arab Emirates) Al-Wasl	19 October 1988 (aged 20)	1.86 m (6 ft 1 in)
13	G	Ibrahim Al-Sari		4 July 1980 (aged 29)	1.80 m (5 ft 11 in)
14	C	Ali Al-Hattawi		20 November 1979 (aged 29)	2.02 m (6 ft 7 1/2 in)
15	C	Jasim Mohamed	(United Arab Emirates) Al-Wasl	24 November 1988 (aged 20)	2.05 m (6 ft 8 1/2 in)
