= 2009 Philippines men's FIBA Asia Championship team =

2009 Philippine national basketball team

Powerade-Team Pilipinas
- Head coach: Yeng Guiao
- 2009 FIBA Asia Championship: 8th Place
- 2009 SEABA Championship: 1st Place
Home
Uniform

2009 Philippines men's FIBA Asia Championship team, also known as Powerade-Team Pilipinas, was the basketball team that represented the Philippines in international competitions from 2008 to 2009. The team was organized by the Philippine Basketball Association (PBA) sponsored by Coca-Cola Beverages Philippines. The team succeeded San Miguel-Team Pilipinas.

== Formation ==
After Yeng Guiao's appointed as head coach of the new Philippine team (Team Pilipinas), he started to form a national team for the 2009 SEABA Championship, selecting Asi Taulava, Kerby Raymundo, Mick Pennisi, Gabe Norwood, Jayjay Helterbrand, James Yap, Cyrus Baguio, Ryan Reyes, Willie Miller, Jared Dillinger, Ranidel de Ocampo at Arwind Santos. Sonny Thoss and Kelly Williams are both assigned to be reserves due to medical issues.

== Performance ==
In the 2009 FIBA Asia Championship, some players like de Ocampo, and Ryan Reyes were replaced by Japeth Aguilar, and Thoss. In the tournament, they only lost to South Korea in the first round, and won the majority of games in the second round. But they lost to Jordan in the quarterfinals and relegated to classification round, losing to Qatar and South Korea.

== Record ==
=== Preliminary round: Group A ===
Team	Pld	W	L	PF	PA	PD	Pts
South Korea	3	3	0	286	184	+102	6
Philippines	3	2	1	249	169	+80	5
Japan	3	1	2	291	218	+73	4
Sri Lanka	3	0	3	130	385	−255	3

August 6
9:00

Report

Philippines	115–31	Sri Lanka
Scoring by quarter: 28–9, 16–8, 42–9, 29–5
Pts: Dillinger 21; Rebs: Taulava 13; Asts: Miller, Baguio 5		Pts: Rajapakshe, Fernando 8 Rebs: Randima, Fernando 4 Asts: Rajapakshe 2

Tianjin Arena, Tianjin

August 7
21:00

Report

Japan	69–78	Philippines
Scoring by quarter: 22–17, 19–18, 12–21, 16–22
Pts: Yamada 16; Rebs: Takeuchi 13; Asts: Kashiwagi 2		Pts: Thoss 15; Rebs: Taulava, Thoss 8 Asts: Helterbrand, Miller 4

Tianjin Arena, Tianjin

August 8
21:00

Report

Philippines	56–69	South Korea
Scoring by quarter: 14–17, 11–18, 19–16, 12–18
Pts: Baguio 16; Rebs: Miller 9 Asts: Norwood 2		Pts: Yang H.J. 14; Rebs: Kim J.S. 8 Asts: Yang D.G. 4

Tianjin Arena, Tianjin

=== Second round: Group E ===
- The results and the points of the matches between the same teams that were already played during the preliminary round shall be taken into account for the second round.

Team	Pld	W	L	PF	PA	PD	Pts
Iran	5	5	0	436	328	+108	10
South Korea	5	4	1	380	340	+40	9
Philippines	5	3	2	374	367	+7	8
Chinese Taipei	5	2	3	379	350	+29	7
Japan	5	1	4	371	424	−53	6
Kuwait	5	0	5	277	408	−131	5

August 10
16:00

Report

Philippines	77–70	Chinese Taipei
Scoring by quarter: 16–21, 17–14, 29–19, 15–16
Pts: Yap 23; Rebs: Five players 5 Asts: Helterbrand 5		Pts: Tseng W.T. 21; Rebs: Lin C.C. 9 Asts: Tseng W.T. 2

Tianjin Arena, Tianjin

August 11
11:00

Report

Iran	88–78	Philippines
Scoring by quarter: 27–14, 24–20, 23–24, 14–20
Pts: Nikkhah 25; Rebs: Haddadi 16; Asts: Haddadi 5		Pts: Yap, Miller 14; Rebs: Miller 9 Asts: Aguilar, Baguio 2

Tianjin Arena, Tianjin

August 12
9:00

Report

Philippines	85–71	Kuwait
Scoring by quarter: 17–13, 23–16, 20–22, 25–20
Pts: Baguio 14; Rebs: Taulava 10; Asts: Raymundo, Helterbrand 2		Pts: Al-Rabah, Ashkanani 20; Rebs: Ashkanani 8 Asts: Mohanna, Ashkanani 2

Tianjin Arena, Tianjin

=== Final round ===
Quarterfinals
August 14
Qatar	65
Iran	75
August 14
Jordan	81
Philippines	70
August 14
Chinese Taipei	83
China	101
August 14
South Korea	65
Lebanon	68

Semifinals
August 15
Iran	77
Jordan	75
August 15
China	72
Lebanon	68

Final
August 16
Iran	70
China	52
3rd place
August 16
Jordan	80
Lebanon	66

==== Quarterfinals ====
August 14
14:00

Report

Jordan	81–70	Philippines
Scoring by quarter: 22–17, 23–16, 22–19, 14–18
Pts: Wright 21; Rebs: Z. Abbas 16; Asts: Daghlas 9		Pts: Norwood 11; Rebs: Yap 7 Asts: Miller 3

Tianjin Arena, Tianjin

=== 5th–8th Classification ===
Semifinals
August 15
Philippines	65
Qatar	83
August 15
South Korea	65
Chinese Taipei	70

5th place
August 16
Qatar	79
Chinese Taipei	87
7th place
August 16
Philippines	80
South Korea	82

==== Semifinals 5th–8th ====
August 15
14:00

Report

Philippines	65–83	Qatar
Scoring by quarter: 16–23, 16–26, 8–17, 25–17
Pts: Raymundo 12; Rebs: Pennisi 6 Asts: Helterbrand 3		Pts: Abdulrahman 23; Rebs: El-Sayad 12; Asts: Ali 2

Tianjin Arena, Tianjin

==== Battle for 7th ====
August 16
14:00

Report

Philippines	80–82	South Korea
Scoring by quarter: 19–26, 24–16, 19–20, 18–20
Pts: Baguio 17; Rebs: Taulava 7 Asts: Norwood 3		Pts: Oh S.K. 31; Rebs: Oh S.K. 10; Asts: Lee J.S., Yang D.G., Yang H.J. 3

Tianjin Arena, Tianjin

== Roster ==
Philippines national basketball team – 2009 FIBA Asia Championship roster
Players
Coaches

Pos.	No.	Name	Age – Date of birth	Height	Club	Ctr.
G/F	4	Jared Dillinger	25 – January 6, 1984	1.96 m (6 ft 5 in)	Talk 'N Text Tropang Texters	(Philippines)
PF	5	Kerby Raymundo	28 – January 19, 1981	2.01 m (6 ft 7 in)	Purefoods Tender Juicy Giants	(Philippines)
SG	6	James Yap	27 – February 15, 1982	1.91 m (6 ft 3 in)	Purefoods Tender Juicy Giants	(Philippines)
F/C	7	Sonny Thoss	27 – December 12, 1981	2.08 m (6 ft 10 in)	Alaska Aces	(Philippines)
C	8	Asi Taulava	36 – March 2, 1973	2.08 m (6 ft 10 in)	Coca-Cola Tigers	(Philippines)
F/C	9	Japeth Aguilar	22 – January 25, 1987	1.98 m (6 ft 6 in)	Western Kentucky	(United States)
G/F	10	Gabe Norwood	24 – February 9, 1985	1.99 m (6 ft 6 in)	Rain or Shine Elasto Painters	(Philippines)
G	11	Willie Miller	32 – July 13, 1977	1.83 m (6 ft 0 in)	Alaska Aces	(Philippines)
PF	12	Mick Pennisi	34 – March 13, 1975	2.11 m (6 ft 11 in)	San Miguel Beermen	(Philippines)
SG	13	Jayjay Helterbrand	32 – October 14, 1976	1.83 m (6 ft 0 in)	Barangay Ginebra Kings	(Philippines)
SG	14	Cyrus Baguio	28 – August 19, 1980	1.88 m (6 ft 2 in)	Barangay Ginebra Kings	(Philippines)
G/F	15	Arwind Santos	28 – June 10, 1981	1.93 m (6 ft 4 in)	San Miguel Beermen	(Philippines)

Head coach

- (Philippines) Yeng Guiao

Assistant coach(es)

- (Philippines) Rhoel Nadurata
- (Philippines) Gee Abanilla
- (Philippines) Kenneth Duremdes

Legend

- (C) Team captain
- (NP) Naturalized player
- Club – describes last
  club before the tournament
- Age – describes age
  on August 6, 2013
