= Jamal Maaytah =

Jordanian basketball player

Zain Group
- Position: Center
- League: Jordan Basketball League

Personal information
- Born: February 24, 1981 (age 45) Altdöbern, Germany
- Listed height: 7 ft 0 in (2.13 m)

Jamal Maaytah
Medal record

Men's basketball

Representing Jordan

FIBA Asia Championship
Bronze medal – third place	2009 Tianjin	Team

Jamal Maaytah, also Jamal Almutusem Habes Almaaytah and Dshamal Schoetz (born February 24, 1981) is a retired Jordanian-German professional basketball player. He was a member of the Jordan national basketball team.

== Career ==
The son of a Jordanian father and a German mother, he grew up in Cottbus, Germany, under the name Dshamal Schoetz. He started playing basketball at age 15. Schoetz attended Sportgymnasium Halle, a sports boarding school in Halle, Germany, playing for local club SV Halle. He helped the team win their first U18 national championship in 1997. In 1998, he participated in the European Championship for Junior Men with Germany's junior national team, averaging 1.3 points and 2.7 rebounds a contest during the tournament.

From 1998 to 2000, he attended Wesleyan Christian Academy in High Point, North Carolina. Averaging 20.1 points, 10.1 rebounds and 4 blocks per contest in his senior season, Schoetz was a McDonald's High School All-America team nominee, while making the Winston-Salem Journal's All-Northwest Team. In August 1999, he announced his decision to enroll at the Wake Forest University. After redshirting in the 2000–01 season, Schoetz tore his anterior cruciate and medial collateral ligaments in his right knee in October 2001 and subsequently missed the 2001–02 season. Schoetz made his debut for the Wake Forest Demon Deacons men's basketball team during the 2002–03 season, in which he appeared in six contests, averaging 1.3 points as well as .8 rebounds per game. In 2003, he transferred to NCAA Division 3 school Greensboro College. In 2003–04, he averaged 8.8 points and 6.9 rebounds a game for Greensboro. In 2004, Schoetz appeared on the extended roster of Germany's A2 national team. Prior to the 2004–05 season, Schoetz suffered an eye injury in practice and therefore was unable to play in his senior season at Greensboro College.

In 2005, Schoetz played professionally for the Pennsylvania ValleyDawgs in the United States Basketball League. He started the 2005–06 season with the Fastlink Basketball Club (Zain) in Amman, Jordan, but parted company with the team in February 2006. Back in Germany, he was signed with 2. Basketball Bundesliga side Ehingen Urspring in the 2006–07 season, averaging 9.3 points as well as 6.0 rebounds per outing. In September 2007, he was announced as a new signing of Spanish side AB Esplugues, but finally went back to Jordan, again joining Fastlink. He played for the club until 2010.

Under the name Maaytah, he competed with the Jordanian team at several international events, including the 2005 Pan Arab Games, 2005 FIBA Asia Championship, the William Jones Cup, and the FIBA Asia Championship 2009. In 2009, he helped the Jordanian team to a national best third-place finish by averaging 3.2 points and 2.5 rebounds per game off the bench for the team. In 2007, he was banned from playing for the Jordan national team because he had represented the German junior national team earlier in his career. Later, he regained the eligibility to play for Jordan.
