= Vineeth Revi Mathew =

Indian basketball player (born 1984)

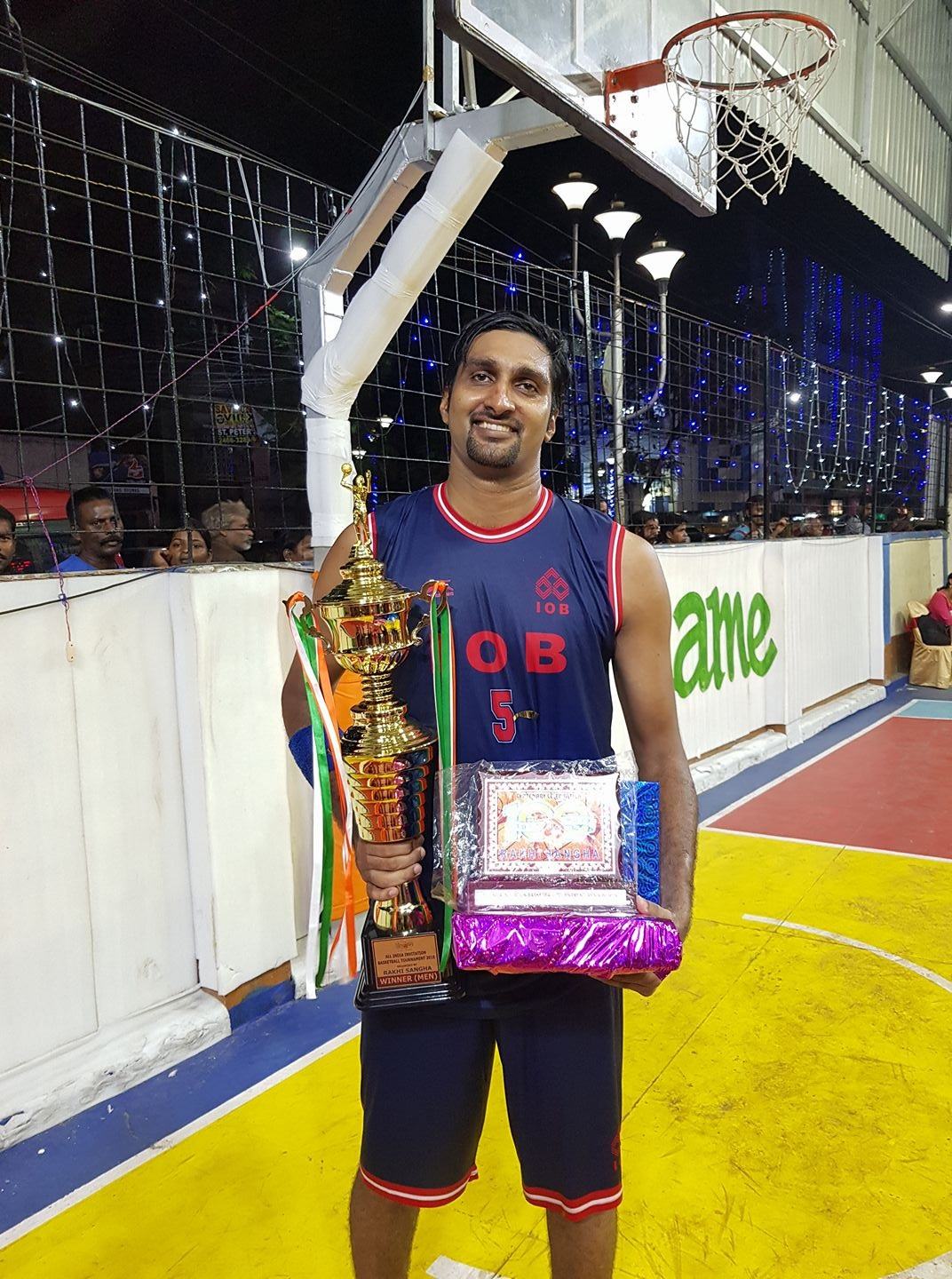

Young Cagers
- Position: Center
- League: FIBA Asia Champions Cup

Personal information
- Born: November 5, 1984 (age 42) Kerala, India
- Listed height: 6 ft 8 in (2.03 m)

Vineeth Revi Mathew (born November 5, 1984, in India) is an Indian professional basketball player. He plays for the Young Cagers who compete at the FIBA Asia Champions Cup and is a member of the India national basketball team.

== Career ==
Revi Mathew competed for the India national basketball team for the first time at the FIBA Asia Championship 2009. He averaged 9.6 points and 6.6 rebounds for the tournament. He scored a game-high 24 points in an 89-73 victory over Uzbekistan in the 13th place game.
