= Lee Kyu-sup =

South Korean basketball player

Personal information
- Born: November 13, 1977 (age 49) South Korea
- Listed height: 6 ft 6 in (1.98 m)

Career information
- College: Korea University
- Playing career: 2000–2013
- Position: Center
- Coaching career: 2013–present

Career history

Playing
- 2000-2013: Seoul Samsung Thunders
- 2002-2004: → Sangmu (loan)

Coaching
- 2014-present: Seoul Samsung Thunders (assistant coach)

Career highlights
- KBL Championship (2001, 2006); KBL regular season (2001); KBL Rookie of the Year (2001)
Medals
Representing South Korea
Men's basketball
Asian Games
Gold medal – first place	2002 Busan	Team

- Lee Kyu-sup
- Hangul: 이규섭
- Hanja: 李圭燮
- RR: I Gyuseop
- MR: I Kyusŏp

Lee Kyu-sup (born November 13, 1977) is a South Korean basketball coach and retired player. He spent his entire playing career with the Korean Basketball League team Seoul Samsung Thunders and played for the South Korean national team at the 2009 FIBA Asia Championship.

== Career ==
=== Early years ===
Lee caught the attention of scouts when he led Daekyeong Commercial High School to the regional high school basketball championships, the first time Daekyeong has ever won a basketball championship. He played for Korea University.

=== Professional ===
Lee was the first overall pick of the 2000 KBL draft and was picked by Suwon Samsung Thunders, which moved to Seoul and became Seoul Samsung Thunders a year later. He won the KBL Rookie of the Year Award in his first season as a professional. During the team's successful run to the 2005-06 championship, he was a core member of a formidable squad that included Kang Hyuk, Lee Jung-suk and Seo Jang-hoon. Due to his and Seo's height, the team's quick and physical offensive style was nicknamed "high altitude basketball" by the press.

He retired at the end of the 2012-13 season.

=== Coaching ===
After his retirement, Lee decided to go into coaching and was sent to the United States for training. He spent a year at the Golden State Warrior's G League affiliate Santa Cruz Warriors He returned to Seoul Samsung Thunder where he worked under head coach Lee Sang-min, his former national teammate.

He took over as acting head coach after Lee Sang-min resigned in January 2022, in the middle of the season.

== National team ==
Previously, he competed for the Korean junior national team at the 1995 World Championship for Junior Men and 1997 U-22 World Championship. At the FIBA Asia Championship, Lee helped the Koreans to a seventh-place finish while averaging 5.5 points per game, including a game-high 28 in Korea's 122-54 preliminary round win over Sri Lanka. Despite his efforts, Korea failed to qualify for the semifinals of the tournament for the first time in their 25 tournament appearances.

== Personal life ==
Lee married flight attendant Park Gye-ri in 2006. They have two sons.

His older brother Lee Heung-seop is also a former basketball player but went into sports management after a brief playing career. He is the general secretary of KBL team Wonju DB Promy.
