= Kirill Gusev =

Belarusian footballer

Personal information
- Date of birth: 6 April 1999 (age 27)
- Place of birth: Mogilev, Belarus
- Height: 1.92 m (6 ft 4 in)
- Position: Forward

Youth career
- 2016–2018: Dnepr Mogilev

Senior career*
Years	Team	Apps	(Gls)
2018	Dnepr Mogilev	1	(0)
2019	Dnyapro Mogilev	0	(0)
2020–2023	Dnepr Mogilev	69	(20)
2021	→ Slonim-2017 (loan)	17	(5)
2023	→ Orsha (loan)	15	(1)
- * Club domestic league appearances and goals as of 31 December 2023

Kirill Gusev (Belarusian: Кірыл Гусеў; Russian: Кирилл Гусев; born 6 April 1999) is a Belarusian professional footballer.
