= Tomoo Amino =

Japanese basketball player (born 1980)

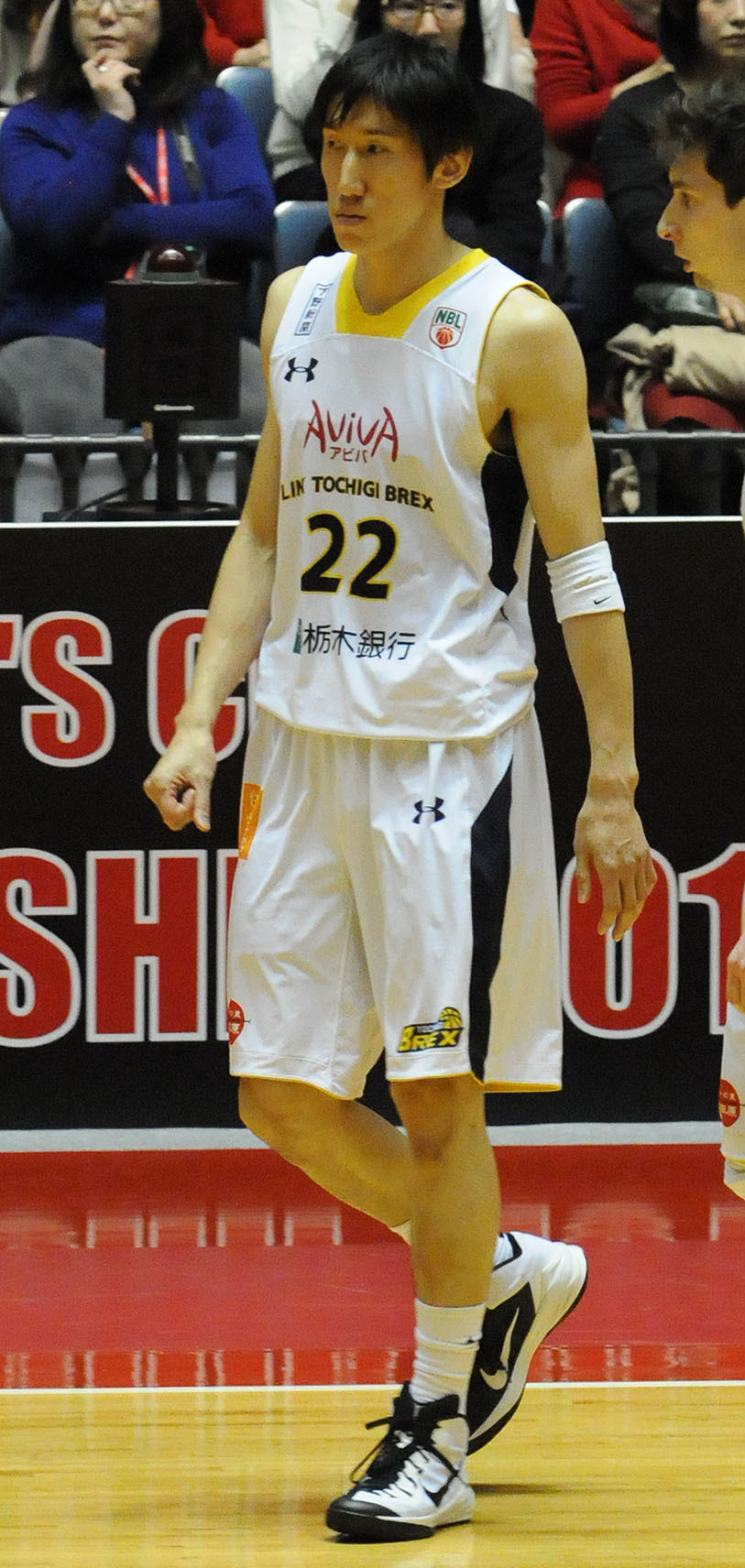

Hakuoh University
- Position: Head coach

Personal information
- Born: September 25, 1980 (age 46) Akiruno, Tokyo, Japan
- Listed height: 6 ft 5 in (1.96 m)

Career history

Coaching
- 2017-: Hakuoh University
Medals
Representing Japan
FIBA Asia Championship
Silver medal – second place	2009 Tianjin	Team competition
William Jones Cup
Bronze medal – third place	2010 Taipei	Team

Tomoo Amino (網野 友雄, Amino Tomoo; born September 25, 1980) is a former Japanese professional basketball player. He played for the Aisin Seahorses of the JBL Super League. Amino also was a member of the Japan national basketball team. He played for the team in the 2006 FIBA World Championship and the FIBA Asia Championship 2007 and FIBA Asia Championship 2009.

Amino played professionally with the Aisin Seahorses of the JBL Super League. In the 2009-10 season, Amino entered the month-long winter break averaging 4.5 points per game for the Seahorses. Despite this, the popular Amino was voted by fans as a starter to the West squad for the 2009-10 JBL Super League All-Star game.
