= Mohammad Reza Akbari =

Iranian basketball player

No. 99 – Zob Ahan Isfahan BC
- Position: Small forward
- League: Iranian League

Personal information
- Born: September 20, 1986 (age 40) Isfahan, Iran
- Listed height: 6 ft 5 in (1.96 m)

Career information
- Playing career: 2004–present

Career history
- 2004–2012: Zob Ahan Isfahan BC
- 2012–2014: Foolad Mahan
- 2014–2015: Petrochimi Bandar Imam
- 2015–2016: Azad University
- 2016–2018: Naft Abadan
- 2018–2019: Zob Ahan Isfahan BC
- 2019–2020: Petrochimi Bandar Imam
- 2020–present: Zob Ahan Isfahan BC

Mohammad Reza Akbari
Medal record

Men's basketball

Representing Iran

Asian Championship
Gold medal – first place	2007 Tokushima	Team
Gold medal – first place	2009 Tianjin	Team

Mohammad Reza Akbari Bisheh, (Persian: محمد رضا اكبری بیشه, born September 20, 1986, in Isfahan, Iran) is a professional Iranian basketball player who currently plays for Zob Ahan Isfahan BC of the Iranian Super League and also for the Iranian national basketball team. He is a six-foot-four-inch shooting guard.

Akbari is also a member of the Iran national basketball team. He first played for the team during their first ever gold medal run at the FIBA Asia Championship 2007. He saw action in five of nine games off the bench for the Iranians at the FIBA Asia Championship 2009, where the team won its second consecutive gold medal to qualify for the 2010 FIBA World Championship.

== Honours ==
=== National team ===
- Asian Championship
  - Gold medal: 2007, 2009 , 2014
- Asian Under-18 Championship
  - Gold medal: 2004
