= Jasim Abdalla =

Emirati basketball player (born 1988)

Jasim Mohamed Abdalla
Al-Wasl
- Position: Center
- League: United Arab Emirates Basketball League

Personal information
- Born: November 24, 1988 (age 37) London, England
- Listed height: 6 ft 9 in (2.06 m)

Jasim Mohamed Abdalla (born November 24, 1988, in London) is a United Arab Emirates professional basketball player.

== Club career ==
At the club level, Mohamed currently plays professionally for Al-Wasl of the United Arab Emirates Basketball League.

== International career ==
Mohamed also competed for the United Arab Emirates national basketball team for the first time at the FIBA Asia Championship 2007 and has since participated in the FIBA Asia Championship 2009. Despite being only 20 years old at the 2009 tournament, he averaged 7.3 points per game and 4.7 rebounds per game in helping the UAE to a 12th-place finish, their best showing since 2001.
