= Younis Khamis =

Emirati basketball player (born 1982)

Al-Wasl
- Position: Guard
- League: UAE Basketball League

Personal information
- Born: July 23, 1982 (age 44) Dubai
- Listed height: 6 ft 1 in (1.85 m)

Younis Khamis Ibrahim (born July 23, 1982, in Dubai) is an Emirati professional basketball player.

== Club career ==
At the club level, Khamis plays for the AlWasl Club AlShabab Club AlAHli Club in the UAE basketball league. He is also a member of the United Arab Emirates national basketball team.

== International career ==
Khamis competed for the United Arab Emirates national basketball team at both the FIBA Asia Championship 2007 and GCC Championship 2007 and FIBA Asia Championship 2009 and GCC championship 2010 and FIBA Asia Japan championship 2011 and Arab championship 2011 and Dubai tournaments 2012 and 2013.
