= Ary Chandra =

Indonesian basketball player

Personal information
- Born: November 10, 1984 (age 42) Wonosobo, Indonesia
- Listed height: 5 ft 11 in (1.80 m)
- Listed weight: 161 lb (73 kg)

Career information
- College: Tarumanagara (2002-2008)
- NBA draft: 2006: undrafted
- Playing career: 2008–2016
- Position: Shooting guard

Career history
- 2008-2016: Pelita Jaya Basketball

Career highlights
- All-NBL Indonesia Second Team (2014); NBL Indonesia scoring champion (2011); All-NBL Indonesia First Team (2011)
Medals
Men's basketball
Representing Indonesia
| Bronze medal – third place | 2011 Jakarta | Team |

Ary Chandra (born November 10, 1984) is a retired Indonesian professional basketball player. In his career he only played for the Pelita Jaya Esia Jakarta of the Indonesian Basketball League (IBL). He is also a former member of the Indonesia national basketball team.

== National team career ==
Chandra competed for the Indonesia national basketball team at the FIBA Asia Championship 2009 for the first time. He averaged 11.4 points per game for the team.
