= 2009 FIBA Asia Championship =

2009年亞洲籃球錦標賽

Tournament details
- Host country: China
- City: Tianjin
- Dates: 6–16 August
- Teams: 16
- Venues: 2 (in 1 host city)

Final positions
- Champions: Iran (2nd title)
- Runners-up: China
- Third place: Jordan
- Fourth place: Lebanon

Tournament statistics
- MVP: (Iran) Hamed Haddadi
- Top scorer: (Jordan) Rasheim Wright (20.7 points per game)

The 2009 FIBA Asia Championship for Men was the biennial Asian continental championship and also served as the FIBA Asia qualifying tournament for the 2010 FIBA World Championship. The tournament was held from August 6 to 16, 2009 in Tianjin, China.

Iran won its second straight FIBA Asia Championship by defeating China 70–52 in the final, although China's premier NBA superstar Yao Ming did not play due to an injury in the 2008-09 NBA season, which caused him to not play in that year's FIBA Asia Championship for China. Jordan defeated Lebanon 80–66 in the bronze medal game to claim the third and final automatic bid for the 2010 FIBA World Championship. Both Iran and Jordan qualified for the FIBA World Championship for the first time while China qualified for the eighth time in the last nine World Championship tournaments, this time without center Yao Ming. Lebanon failed to qualify automatically for a third consecutive world championship, although FIBA later awarded them a wild card to the tournament.

Iranian center Hamed Haddadi was named Most Valuable Player for the second consecutive tournament after leading Iran to its second consecutive title by averaging 15.8 points, 13.1 rebounds, and 4 blocks per game during the tournament.

== Qualification ==
According to the FIBA Asia rules, each zone had two places, and the hosts (China) and Stanković Cup champion (Jordan) were automatically qualified. The other four places are allocated to the zones according to performance in the 2008 FIBA Asia Stanković Cup.

East Asia (1+2)	Gulf (2+2)	Middle Asia (2+2)	Southeast Asia (2)	West Asia (1+2)
China	Qatar	India	Philippines	Jordan
South Korea	Kuwait	Kazakhstan	Indonesia	Iran
Japan	United Arab Emirates	Sri Lanka		Lebanon
	~~Bahrain~~ *	Uzbekistan		

* Chinese Taipei, which finished fourth behind Korea, Japan and China in the East Asian qualifiers, was given a wild card entry into the championship following the withdrawal of Gulf representatives Bahrain.

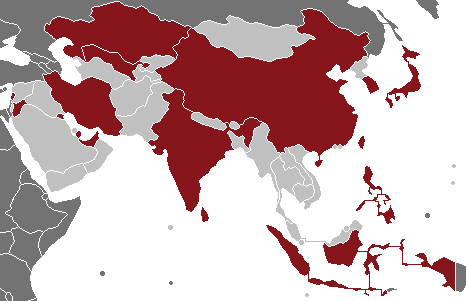
Participating countries

Qualifying was done via the 2008 FIBA Asia Stanković Cup where the champion automatically qualified, and from different FIBA Asia sub-zones. As hosts, China automatically qualified to the championship. In West and Middle Asia, no actual qualifying tournament was done as only a few teams on those sub-zones registered to participate in a qualifying tournament.

With the withdrawal of Bahrain, FIBA Asia chose Chinese Taipei as the final participant to the 16-team field.

This is the first championship where Hong Kong would not participate; they were consistent participant since the inaugural tournament in Manila. Only Hong Kong and Syria did not return from the FIBA Asia Championship 2007. They were replaced by Uzbekistan, returning to the tournament after a four-year absence, and Sri Lanka, making its first appearance since 1995.

This is also the third time in the 21st century in which the championships were held in the People's Republic of China; Shanghai was the host for 2001, and Harbin was the host in 2003.

== Draw ==
The draw was held on June 17 at Tianjin.

Group A	Group B	Group C	Group D
South Korea; Japan; Philippines; Sri Lanka	Iran; Chinese Taipei; Kuwait; Uzbekistan	Kazakhstan; Qatar; India; China	Lebanon; Jordan; Indonesia; United Arab Emirates

== Squads ==
Each team has a roster of twelve players. Only one naturalized player per team is allowed by FIBA.

== Preliminary round ==
=== Group A ===
Team	Pld	W	L	PF	PA	PD	Pts
South Korea	3	3	0	286	184	+102	6
Philippines	3	2	1	249	169	+80	5
Japan	3	1	2	291	218	+73	4
Sri Lanka	3	0	3	130	385	−255	3

August 6
9:00

Report

Philippines	115–31	Sri Lanka
Scoring by quarter: 28–9, 16–8, 42–9, 29–5
Pts: Dillinger 21; Rebs: Taulava 13; Asts: Miller, Baguio 5		Pts: Rajapakshe, Fernando 8 Rebs: Randima, Fernando 4 Asts: Rajapakshe 2

Tianjin Arena, Tianjin

August 6
14:00

Report

South Korea	95–74	Japan
Scoring by quarter: 27–12, 23–19, 28–12, 17–31
Pts: Yang H.J. 23; Rebs: Kim J.S. 6 Asts: Lee J.S., Lee K.S., Kim J.S. 3		Pts: Yamada 21; Rebs: Yamada, Takeuchi, Amino 5 Asts: Okada 2

Tianjin Arena, Tianjin

August 7
9:00

Report

South Korea	122–54	Sri Lanka
Scoring by quarter: 40–16, 25–7, 32–15, 25–16
Pts: Lee K.S. 28; Rebs: Oh S.K. 7 Asts: Joo H.J. 6		Pts: Yasarathna 14; Rebs: Fernando 6 Asts: Rajapakshe 4

Tianjin Arena, Tianjin

August 7
21:00

Report

Japan	69–78	Philippines
Scoring by quarter: 22–17, 19–18, 12–21, 16–22
Pts: Yamada 16; Rebs: Takeuchi 13; Asts: Kashiwagi 2		Pts: Thoss 15; Rebs: Taulava, Thoss 8 Asts: Helterbrand, Miller 4

Tianjin Arena, Tianjin

August 8
14:00

Report

Sri Lanka	45–148	Japan
Scoring by quarter: 11–36, 10–36, 9–35, 15–41
Pts: Danawansa 10; Rebs: Randima, Abeysekara, Senanayake 4 Asts: Rajapakse, Danawansa 2		Pts: Okada 30; Rebs: Amino 12; Asts: Igarashi 12

Tianjin Arena, Tianjin

August 8
21:00

Report

Philippines	56–69	South Korea
Scoring by quarter: 14–17, 11–18, 19–16, 12–18
Pts: Baguio 16; Rebs: Miller 9 Asts: Norwood 2		Pts: Yang H.J. 14; Rebs: Kim J.S. 8 Asts: Yang D.G. 4

Tianjin Arena, Tianjin

=== Group B ===
Team	Pld	W	L	PF	PA	PD	Pts
Iran	3	3	0	247	174	+73	6
Chinese Taipei	3	2	1	242	200	+42	5
Kuwait	3	1	2	166	231	−65	4
Uzbekistan	3	0	3	203	253	−50	3

August 6
16:00

Report

Iran	71–67	Chinese Taipei
Scoring by quarter: 17–14, 19–19, 16–20, 19–14
Pts: Haddadi 22; Rebs: Haddadi 13; Asts: Nikkhah 11		Pts: Wu T.H. 16; Rebs: Tien L. 7 Asts: Lee H.L. 6

Tianjin Arena, Tianjin

August 6
21:00

Report

Kuwait	69–64	Uzbekistan
Scoring by quarter: 16–15, 15–16, 19–23, 19–10
Pts: Al-Rabah 19; Rebs: Ashkanani 10; Asts: Al-Rabah 5		Pts: Kozlov 25; Rebs: Juginisov 9 Asts: Shatrov 4

Nankai University, Tianjin

August 7
16:00

Report

Chinese Taipei	73–51	Kuwait
Scoring by quarter: 21–8, 15–17, 20–10, 17–16
Pts: Yang C.M. 24; Rebs: Wu C.L. 10; Asts: Su I.C. 6		Pts: Ashkanani 13; Rebs: Al-Hamidi 7 Asts: Mohanna 4

Tianjin Arena, Tianjin

August 7
21:00

Report

Iran	82–61	Uzbekistan
Scoring by quarter: 23–17, 17–16, 32–12, 10–16
Pts: Kamrani 23; Rebs: Sahakian 7 Asts: Kamrani, Akbari, Nikkhah 2		Pts: Denisov 13; Rebs: Juginisov 8 Asts: Gusev, Nuraliev, Rahimov 2

Nankai University, Tianjin

August 8
11:00

Report

Uzbekistan	78–102	Chinese Taipei
Scoring by quarter: 10–23, 19–29, 18–27, 31–23
Pts: Kozlov 25; Rebs: Safarov 11; Asts: Kozlov 4		Pts: Chang T.H. 22; Rebs: Tseng W.T. 6 Asts: Su I.C. 7

Tianjin Arena, Tianjin

August 8
16:00

Report

Kuwait	46–94	Iran
Scoring by quarter: 11–27, 13–21, 10–20, 12–26
Pts: Ashkanani 10; Rebs: Ashkanani 7 Asts: Seven players 1		Pts: Nikkhah 21; Rebs: Sahakian 9 Asts: Amini 4

Tianjin Arena, Tianjin

=== Group C ===
Team	Pld	W	L	PF	PA	PD	Pts
China	3	3	0	287	166	+121	6
Qatar	3	2	1	233	224	+9	5
Kazakhstan	3	1	2	192	223	−31	4
India	3	0	3	191	290	−99	3

August 6
11:00

Report

Kazakhstan	62–77	Qatar
Scoring by quarter: 12–15, 18–23, 13–15, 19–24
Pts: Tyutyunik 19; Rebs: Ponomarev 10; Asts: Yargaliyev 3		Pts: Abdulrahman 20; Rebs: Abdelqader 11; Asts: Ismail 4

Tianjin Arena, Tianjin

August 6
19:00

Report

India	49–121	China
Scoring by quarter: 11–36, 10–26, 13–30, 15–29
Pts: Koroth 14; Rebs: Dinesh 8 Asts: T. Singh 3		Pts: Hu X.F., Yi J.L., Su W. 16; Rebs: Wang Z.Z. 7 Asts: Liu W. 4

Tianjin Arena, Tianjin

August 7
19:00

Report

Kazakhstan	56–74	China
Scoring by quarter: 14–26, 11–13, 11–14, 20–21
Pts: Ponomarev 15; Rebs: Ponomarev 8 Asts: Voyeikov 2		Pts: Yi J.L., Wang Z.Z. 17; Rebs: Wang Z.Z. 14; Asts: Sun Y., Du F. 3

Tianjin Arena, Tianjin

August 7
19:00

Report

Qatar	95–70	India
Scoring by quarter: 24–18, 25–17, 20–20, 26–15
Pts: Musa 20; Rebs: Turki 9 Asts: Suliman 4		Pts: T. Singh 17; Rebs: Mathew 6 Asts: Kadam, Bhriguvanshi, J. Singh 2

Nankai University, Tianjin

August 8
19:00

Report

China	92–61	Qatar
Scoring by quarter: 23–12, 26–16, 27–9, 16–24
Pts: Liu W., Wang Z.Z. 15; Rebs: Wang Z.Z. 8 Asts: Hu X.F., Liu W. 4		Pts: El-Sayad 16; Rebs: El-Sayad 7 Asts: Musa 5

Tianjin Arena, Tianjin

August 8
19:00

Report

India	72–74	Kazakhstan
Scoring by quarter: 15–16, 14–17, 20–28, 23–13
Pts: Bhriguvanshi 26; Rebs: J. Singh 6 Asts: Kadam 4		Pts: Ponomarev 18; Rebs: Ponomarev 13; Asts: Ismail 5

Nankai University, Tianjin

=== Group D ===
Team	Pld	W	L	PF	PA	PD	Pts
Jordan	3	3	0	268	181	+87	6
Lebanon	3	2	1	298	158	+140	5
United Arab Emirates	3	1	2	173	250	−77	4
Indonesia	3	0	3	146	296	−150	3

August 6
19:00

Report

Indonesia	63–68 (OT)	United Arab Emirates
Scoring by quarter: 17–20, 15–12, 9–9, 17–17, Overtime: 5–10
Pts: Chandra 15; Rebs: Poedjakesuma 14; Asts: Sebayang 4		Pts: Al-Zaabi 19; Rebs: Mohamed 10; Asts: Khamis 4

Nankai University, Tianjin

August 6
21:00

Report

Lebanon	67–84	Jordan
Scoring by quarter: 14–21, 18–14, 18–27, 17–22
Pts: Freije 17; Rebs: Vroman 8 Asts: Vroman, Beshara 4		Pts: Wright 23; Rebs: Z. Abbas 10; Asts: Daghlas 3

Tianjin Arena, Tianjin

August 7
11:00

Report

Jordan	105–47	Indonesia
Scoring by quarter: 21–17, 26–5, 26–12, 32–13
Pts: I. Abbas 23; Rebs: I. Abbas 19; Asts: Al-Sous 5		Pts: Purwanto 8 Rebs: Wijaya, Thoyib 5 Asts: Purwanto 2

Tianjin Arena, Tianjin

August 7
14:00

Report

Lebanon	108–38	United Arab Emirates
Scoring by quarter: 34–13, 19–14, 25–11, 30–0
Pts: Vroman, El Khatib 19; Rebs: Vroman, Freije, El Khatib 7 Asts: Mahmoud 5		Pts: Al-Nuaimi 13; Rebs: Al-Zaabi 5 Asts: Khamis 2

Tianjin Arena, Tianjin

August 8
9:00

Report

United Arab Emirates	67–79	Jordan
Scoring by quarter: 18–14, 11–26, 18–16, 20–23
Pts: Al-Nuaimi 18; Rebs: Mohamed 5 Asts: Sultan, Al-Nuaimi 2		Pts: Z. Abbas 16; Rebs: Z. Abbas 12; Asts: Daghlas 4

Tianjin Arena, Tianjin

August 8
21:00

Report

Indonesia	36–123	Lebanon
Scoring by quarter: 13–32, 7–33, 8–34, 8–24
Pts: Indrawan 9 Rebs: Kurniahu 5 Asts: Purwanto, Indrawan 2		Pts: El Khatib 29; Rebs: El Khatib 9 Asts: Fahed 7

Nankai University, Tianjin

== Second round ==
- The results and the points of the matches between the same teams that were already played during the preliminary round shall be taken into account for the second round.

=== Group E ===
Team	Pld	W	L	PF	PA	PD	Pts
Iran	5	5	0	436	328	+108	10
South Korea	5	4	1	380	340	+40	9
Philippines	5	3	2	374	367	+7	8
Chinese Taipei	5	2	3	379	350	+29	7
Japan	5	1	4	371	424	−53	6
Kuwait	5	0	5	277	408	−131	5

August 10
9:00

Report

South Korea	78–58	Kuwait
Scoring by quarter: 25–11, 7–17, 24–15, 22–15
Pts: Yang H.J. 16; Rebs: Oh S.K. 8 Asts: Joo H.J. 5		Pts: Mohanna 18; Rebs: Ashkanani 7 Asts: Mohanna 2

Tianjin Arena, Tianjin

August 10
14:00

Report

Japan	71–101	Iran
Scoring by quarter: 14–29, 18–25, 20–26, 19–21
Pts: Takeuchi 19; Rebs: Takeuchi 6 Asts: Amino 5		Pts: Nikkhah, Haddadi 22; Rebs: Haddadi 15; Asts: Nikkhah 6

Tianjin Arena, Tianjin

August 10
16:00

Report

Philippines	77–70	Chinese Taipei
Scoring by quarter: 16–21, 17–14, 29–19, 15–16
Pts: Yap 23; Rebs: Five players 5 Asts: Helterbrand 5		Pts: Tseng W.T. 21; Rebs: Lin C.C. 9 Asts: Tseng W.T. 2

Tianjin Arena, Tianjin

August 11
11:00

Report

Iran	88–78	Philippines
Scoring by quarter: 27–14, 24–20, 23–24, 14–20
Pts: Nikkhah 25; Rebs: Haddadi 16; Asts: Haddadi 5		Pts: Yap, Miller 14; Rebs: Miller 9 Asts: Aguilar, Baguio 2

Tianjin Arena, Tianjin

August 11
14:00

Report

Kuwait	51–78	Japan
Scoring by quarter: 0–17, 17–25, 20–19, 14–17
Pts: Al-Rabah 10; Rebs: Al-Khabbaz 7 Asts: A.A. Faleh, Mohanna 2		Pts: Amino 17; Rebs: Takeuchi 12; Asts: Okada, Orimo 3

Tianjin Arena, Tianjin

August 11
16:00

Report

Chinese Taipei	70–72	South Korea
Scoring by quarter: 19–25, 16–18, 15–9, 20–20
Pts: Chang T.H. 17; Rebs: Tien L. 9 Asts: Lin C.C. 4		Pts: Kim J.S. 20; Rebs: Yang H.J. 15; Asts: Yang D.G. 4

Tianjin Arena, Tianjin

August 12
9:00

Report

Philippines	85–71	Kuwait
Scoring by quarter: 17–13, 23–16, 20–22, 25–20
Pts: Baguio 14; Rebs: Taulava 10; Asts: Raymundo, Helterbrand 2		Pts: Al-Rabah, Ashkanani 20; Rebs: Ashkanani 8 Asts: Mohanna, Ashkanani 2

Tianjin Arena, Tianjin

August 12
14:00

Report

Japan	79–99	Chinese Taipei
Scoring by quarter: 22–29, 21–20, 10–24, 26–26
Pts: Igarashi, Takeuchi 18; Rebs: Takeuchi 7 Asts: Igarashi, Ito 4		Pts: Tseng W.T. 20; Rebs: Tseng W.T. 10; Asts: Four players 3

Tianjin Arena, Tianjin

August 12
21:00

Report

South Korea	66–82	Iran
Scoring by quarter: 19–18, 12–26, 18–18, 17–20
Pts: Yang D.G. 13; Rebs: Yang D.G. 5 Asts: Lee J.S., Yang D.G. 4		Pts: Afagh 24; Rebs: Haddadi 16; Asts: Davari 5

Tianjin Arena, Tianjin

=== Group F ===
Team	Pld	W	L	PF	PA	PD	Pts
China	5	5	0	408	327	+81	10
Jordan	5	4	1	418	363	+55	9
Lebanon	5	3	2	421	312	+109	8
Qatar	5	2	3	352	346	+6	7
Kazakhstan	5	1	4	338	410	−72	6
United Arab Emirates	5	0	5	265	444	−179	5

August 10
11:00

Report

Kazakhstan	80–98	Jordan
Scoring by quarter: 19–23, 21–27, 20–24, 20–24
Pts: Tyutyunik, Ponomarev 24; Rebs: Tyutyunik 7 Asts: Voyeikov 3		Pts: Wright 29; Rebs: Wright, Z. Abbas, I. Abbas 4 Asts: Daghlas 4

Tianjin Arena, Tianjin

August 10
19:00

Report

China	82–59	United Arab Emirates
Scoring by quarter: 27–10, 16–16, 15–21, 24–12
Pts: Yi J.L. 18; Rebs: Yi J.L. 11; Asts: Liu W. 5		Pts: Al-Zaabi 20; Rebs: Al-Zaabi, Mohamed 6 Asts: Al-Nuaimi 6

Tianjin Arena, Tianjin

August 10
21:00

Report

Qatar	63–73	Lebanon
Scoring by quarter: 18–20, 15–9, 18–22, 12–22
Pts: Abdulrahman 14; Rebs: Ismail 11; Asts: Abdulrahman 4		Pts: Freije 15; Rebs: Vroman 8 Asts: El Khatib 6

Tianjin Arena, Tianjin

August 11
9:00

Report

United Arab Emirates	56–84	Kazakhstan
Scoring by quarter: 21–15, 10–20, 14–22, 11–27
Pts: Al-Nuaimi, Al-Zaabi 16; Rebs: Al-Zaabi 3 Asts: Al-Zaabi 2		Pts: Tyutyunik 26; Rebs: Ponomarev 13; Asts: Ponomarev 3

Tianjin Arena, Tianjin

August 11
19:00

Report

Lebanon	68–71	China
Scoring by quarter: 15–20, 13–15, 16–20, 24–16
Pts: Vroman 25; Rebs: Abdelnour 14; Asts: Abdelnour 3		Pts: Yi J.L., Zhu F.Y. 19; Rebs: Yi J.L. 13; Asts: Zhang Q.P., Yi J.L. 3

Tianjin Arena, Tianjin

August 11
21:00

Report

Jordan	74–60	Qatar
Scoring by quarter: 24–14, 10–11, 14–18, 26–17
Pts: Z. Abbas 21; Rebs: Z. Abbas, Al-Khas 6 Asts: Daghlas 4		Pts: Abdulrahman 24; Rebs: Abdulrahman 7 Asts: Ismail, Ali 2

Tianjin Arena, Tianjin

August 12
11:00

Report

Qatar	91–45	United Arab Emirates
Scoring by quarter: 22–7, 25–5, 23–10, 21–23
Pts: Abdulrahman 18; Rebs: Abdelqader 9 Asts: Ma. Saleem 4		Pts: Al-Sari 16; Rebs: Al-Hattawi 6 Asts: Sultan 2

Tianjin Arena, Tianjin

August 12
16:00

Report

Kazakhstan	56–105	Lebanon
Scoring by quarter: 6–19, 10–32, 22–23, 18–31
Pts: Tyutyunik 12; Rebs: Gavrilov 8 Asts: Ismail 4		Pts: El Khatib 24; Rebs: Kanaan 7 Asts: Mahmoud 8

Tianjin Arena, Tianjin

August 12
19:00

Report

China	89–83	Jordan
Scoring by quarter: 24–15, 21–19, 25–28, 19–21
Pts: Yi J.L. 29; Rebs: Yi J.L. 18; Asts: Yi J.L., Zhu F.Y. 4		Pts: Wright 28; Rebs: Hadrab, Adais 5 Asts: Four players 2

Tianjin Arena, Tianjin

== Classification 13th–16th ==
Semifinals
August 10
Sri Lanka	47
Uzbekistan	90
August 10
India	91
Indonesia	52

13th place
August 11
Uzbekistan	73
India	89
15th place
August 11
Sri Lanka	42
Indonesia	74

=== Semifinals ===
August 10
19:00

Report

Sri Lanka	47–90	Uzbekistan
Scoring by quarter: 19–21, 12–32, 7–19, 9–18
Pts: Danawansa, Senanayake 9 Rebs: Rajapakse, Fernando 6 Asts: Danawansa, Rajapakse 2		Pts: Nuraliev 27; Rebs: Nuraliev 9 Asts: Gusev, Rahimov, Safarov 2

Nankai University, Tianjin

August 10
21:00

Report

India	91–52	Indonesia
Scoring by quarter: 23–9, 22–8, 26–15, 20–20
Pts: J. Singh 18; Rebs: J. Singh 10; Asts: Bhriguvanshi 6		Pts: Purwanto, Chandra, Indrawan 10; Rebs: Chandra 4 Asts: Sebayang 2

Nankai University, Tianjin

=== 15th place ===
August 11
19:00

Report

Sri Lanka	42–74	Indonesia
Scoring by quarter: 10–22, 14–22, 12–15, 6–15
Pts: Pushpakumara 12; Rebs: Abeysekara 8 Asts: Danawansa 2		Pts: Chandra 19; Rebs: Thoyib 14; Asts: Poedjakesuma 3

Nankai University, Tianjin

=== 13th place ===
August 11
21:00

Report

Uzbekistan	73–89	India
Scoring by quarter: 17–24, 20–23, 16–19, 20–23
Pts: Gusev, Kozlov 17; Rebs: Yahin 6 Asts: Gusev 3		Pts: Mathew 24; Rebs: J. Singh 15; Asts: Kadam 7

Nankai University, Tianjin

== Classification 9th–12th ==
Semifinals
August 14
Kuwait	57
Kazakhstan	76
August 14
Japan	86
United Arab Emirates	59

9th place
August 15
Kazakhstan	77
Japan	73
11th place
August 15
Kuwait	65
United Arab Emirates	61

=== Semifinals ===
August 14
9:00

Report

Kuwait	57–76	Kazakhstan
Scoring by quarter: 6–19, 17–13, 15–22, 19–22
Pts: Ashkanani 20; Rebs: Ashkanani 6 Asts: Mohanna 5		Pts: Tyutyunik 20; Rebs: Ponomarev 13; Asts: Yargaliyev 3

Tianjin Arena, Tianjin

August 14
11:00

Report

Japan	86–59	United Arab Emirates
Scoring by quarter: 24–14, 10–19, 21–16, 31–10
Pts: Takeuchi 20; Rebs: Takeuchi 13; Asts: Igarashi 7		Pts: Sultan 15; Rebs: Khamis 8 Asts: Al-Nuaimi 3

Tianjin Arena, Tianjin

=== 11th place ===
August 15
9:00

Report

United Arab Emirates	61–65	Kuwait
Scoring by quarter: 17–15, 11–12, 23–16, 10–22
Pts: Khamis 15; Rebs: Al-Sari 7 Asts: Al-Nuaimi 3		Pts: Ashkanani 20; Rebs: Mohanna 6 Asts: Mohanna 5

Tianjin Arena, Tianjin

=== 9th place ===
August 15
11:00

Report

Kazakhstan	77–73	Japan
Scoring by quarter: 17–19, 14–20, 20–16, 26–18
Pts: Ponomarev 22; Rebs: Gavrilov 11; Asts: Ponomarev 3		Pts: Igarashi 20; Rebs: Takeuchi 10; Asts: Amino 4

Tianjin Arena, Tianjin

== Final round ==
Quarterfinals
August 14
Qatar	65
Iran	75
August 14
Jordan	81
Philippines	70
August 14
Chinese Taipei	83
China	101
August 14
South Korea	65
Lebanon	68

Semifinals
August 15
Iran	77
Jordan	75
August 15
China	72
Lebanon	68

Final
August 16
Iran	70
China	52
3rd place
August 16
Jordan	80
Lebanon	66

Semifinals
August 15
Philippines	65
Qatar	83
August 15
South Korea	65
Chinese Taipei	70

5th place
August 16
Qatar	79
Chinese Taipei	87
7th place
August 16
Philippines	80
South Korea	82

=== Quarterfinals ===
August 14
14:00

Report

Jordan	81–70	Philippines
Scoring by quarter: 22–17, 23–16, 22–19, 14–18
Pts: Wright 21; Rebs: Z. Abbas 16; Asts: Daghlas 9		Pts: Norwood 11; Rebs: Yap 7 Asts: Miller 3

Tianjin Arena, Tianjin

August 14
16:00

Report

Qatar	65–75	Iran
Scoring by quarter: 10–12, 20–15, 16–27, 19–21
Pts: Abdulrahman 23; Rebs: El-Sayed 7 Asts: Abdulrahman, Suliman 4		Pts: Afagh 26; Rebs: Haddadi 15; Asts: Nikkhah 5

Tianjin Arena, Tianjin

August 14
19:00

Report

Chinese Taipei	83–101	China
Scoring by quarter: 22–28, 23–25, 16–32, 22–16
Pts: Tien L. 17; Rebs: Wu T.H., Lin C.C., Tien L. 4 Asts: Chang C.F., Tseng W.T. 4		Pts: Yi J.L., Wang Z.Z. 25; Rebs: Yi J.L. 14; Asts: Hu X.F. 6

Tianjin Arena, Tianjin

August 14
21:00

Report

South Korea	65–68	Lebanon
Scoring by quarter: 18–19, 15–13, 16–17, 16–19
Pts: Kim J.S. 14; Rebs: Ha S.J. 9 Asts: Kim J.S. 4		Pts: Fahed 21; Rebs: Vroman 9 Asts: Vroman, Frejie 2

Tianjin Arena, Tianjin

=== Semifinals 5th–8th ===
August 15
14:00

Report

Philippines	65–83	Qatar
Scoring by quarter: 16–23, 16–26, 8–17, 25–17
Pts: Raymundo 12; Rebs: Pennisi 6 Asts: Helterbrand 3		Pts: Abdulrahman 23; Rebs: El-Sayad 12; Asts: Ali 2

Tianjin Arena, Tianjin

August 15
19:00

Report

South Korea	65–70	Chinese Taipei
Scoring by quarter: 9–20, 18–16, 14–13, 24–21
Pts: Ha S.J. 21; Rebs: Oh S.K. 9 Asts: Yang D.G. 4		Pts: Tien L. 18; Rebs: Lee H.L., Tien L. 6 Asts: Lee H.L. 5

Tianjin Arena, Tianjin

=== Semifinals ===
August 15
16:00

Report

Iran	77–75	Jordan
Scoring by quarter: 17–12, 23–15, 16–27, 21–21
Pts: Nikkhah 23; Rebs: Haddadi 12; Asts: Kamrani 6		Pts: Wright 17; Rebs: Z. Abbas 17; Asts: Wright 3

Tianjin Arena, Tianjin

August 15
21:00

Report

China	72–68	Lebanon
Scoring by quarter: 14–18, 21–15, 19–16, 18–19
Pts: Wang Z.Z. 20; Rebs: Wang Z.Z. 9 Asts: Yi J.L. 3		Pts: Vroman 27; Rebs: Vroman 10; Asts: Vroman, Fahed, Freije 2

Tianjin Arena, Tianjin

=== 7th place ===
August 16
14:00

Report

Philippines	80–82	South Korea
Scoring by quarter: 19–26, 24–16, 19–20, 18–20
Pts: Baguio 17; Rebs: Taulava 7 Asts: Norwood 3		Pts: Oh S.K. 31; Rebs: Oh S.K. 10; Asts: Lee J.S., Yang D.G., Yang H.J. 3

Tianjin Arena, Tianjin

=== 5th place ===
August 16
19:00

Report

Qatar	79–87	Chinese Taipei
Scoring by quarter: 24–27, 20–21, 22–17, 13–22
Pts: El-Sayad 19; Rebs: Abdulrahman 7 Asts: Abdulrahman 5		Pts: Yang C.M. 19; Rebs: Lee H.L., Tien L. 4 Asts: Lee H.L. 5

Tianjin Arena, Tianjin

=== 3rd place ===
August 16
16:00

Report

Jordan	80–66	Lebanon
Scoring by quarter: 10–19, 26–9, 20–17, 24–21
Pts: Wright 28; Rebs: Z. Abbas 9 Asts: Wright 5		Pts: Vroman 18; Rebs: Vroman, El Khatib 8 Asts: Vroman 4

Tianjin Arena, Tianjin

=== Final ===
August 16
21:00

Report

Iran	70–52	China
Scoring by quarter: 21–10, 21–15, 14–14, 14–13
Pts: Haddadi 19; Rebs: Haddadi 17; Asts: Nikkhah 6		Pts: Wang Z.Z. 24; Rebs: Yi J.L. 11; Asts: Liu W., Wang S.P. 2

Tianjin Arena, Tianjin

== Final standings ==
Qualified for the 2010 FIBA World Championship
Wild card for the 2010 FIBA World Championship

Rank	Team	Record
1st place, gold medalist(s)	Iran	9–0
2nd place, silver medalist(s)	China	8–1
3rd place, bronze medalist(s)	Jordan	7–2
4	Lebanon	5–4
5	Chinese Taipei	5–4
6	Qatar	4–5
7	South Korea	6–3
8	Philippines	4–5
9	Kazakhstan	4–4
10	Japan	3–5
11	Kuwait	2–6
12	United Arab Emirates	1–7
13	India	2–3
14	Uzbekistan	1–4
15	Indonesia	1–4
16	Sri Lanka	0–5

== Awards ==
2009 Asian champions

Iran
Second title

== Statistical leaders ==
Points

Pos.	Name	PPG
1	(Jordan) Rasheim Wright	20.7
2	(Uzbekistan) Aleksandr Kozlov	19.4
3	(China) Yi Jianlian	18.3
4	(Iran) Samad Nikkhah Bahrami	18.0
5	(Qatar) Saad Abdulrahman	17.8
6	(Lebanon) Jackson Vroman	17.1
7	(Kazakhstan) Alexandr Tyutyunik	16.8
8	(China) Wang Zhizhi	16.7
9	(India) Vishesh Bhriguvanshi	15.8
10	(Iran) Hamed Haddadi	15.8

Rebounds

Pos.	Name	RPG
1	(Iran) Hamed Haddadi	13.1
2	(China) Yi Jianlian	10.4
3	(Kazakhstan) Anton Ponomarev	9.6
4	(Jordan) Zaid Abbas	8.8
5	(Lebanon) Jackson Vroman	8.4
6	(Japan) Kosuke Takeuchi	8.2
7	(China) Wang Zhizhi	7.9
8	(India) Jagdeep Singh	7.8
9	(Iran) Oshin Sahakian	7.7
10	(Japan) Joji Takeuchi	7.2

Assists

Pos.	Name	APG
1	(Iran) Samad Nikkhah Bahrami	4.8
2	(Jordan) Sam Daghlas	4.1
3	(Japan) Kei Igarashi	3.6
4	(India) Sambhaji Kadam	3.2
5	(Iran) Mehdi Kamrani	3.0
5	(South Korea) Lee Jung-suk	3.0
7	(Kuwait) Shayee Mohanna	2.9
8	(China) Liu Wei	2.8
9	(Lebanon) Fadi El Khatib	2.7
9	(Chinese Taipei) Lee Hsueh-lin	2.7
9	(South Korea) Yang Dong-geun	2.7
9	(China) Yi Jianlian	2.7

Steals

Pos.	Name	SPG
1	(Iran) Mehdi Kamrani	2.9
2	(India) Talwinderjit Singh	2.4
3	(Chinese Taipei) Lee Hsueh-lin	2.3
4	(Qatar) Saad Abdulrahman	2.2
5	(Jordan) Rasheim Wright	2.1
6	(Iran) Hamed Afagh	2.0
6	(South Korea) Yang Hee-jong	2.0
8	(United Arab Emirates) Younis Khamis	1.9
9	(Indonesia) Kelly Purwanto	1.8
9	(India) Vishesh Bhriguvanshi	1.8

Blocks

Pos.	Name	BPG
1	(Iran) Hamed Haddadi	4.0
2	(China) Yi Jianlian	2.4
3	(Kazakhstan) Dmitriy Gavrilov	1.5
4	(Japan) Joji Takeuchi	1.2
5	(South Korea) Kim Joo-sung	1.1
6	(Qatar) Mustafa El-Sayad	1.0
6	(Chinese Taipei) Tseng Wen-ting	1.0
8	(South Korea) Ha Seung-jin	1.0
9	(Indonesia) Isman Thoyib	1.0
10	(South Korea) Oh Se-keun	0.9
