= Wu Chien-lung =

Taiwanese basketball player

Wu Chien-Lung
Pure Youth
- Position: Forward
- League: Super Basketball League

Personal information
- Born: September 5, 1988 (age 38) Taipei, Taiwan
- Listed height: 6 ft 4 in (1.93 m)

Wu Chien-Lung (吳建龍, born September 5, 1988, in Taipei, Taiwan) is a Taiwanese professional basketball player. He plays for the Pure Youth of the Super Basketball League. Wu also plays for the Chinese Taipei national basketball team and made his national team debut at the FIBA Asia Championship 2009.

Wu played primarily off the bench for the Chinese Taipei team at the 2009 Asian Championship. At age 20, he was the second youngest player on the fifth-placed Chinese Taipei team. In his most extensive action of the tournament, he grabbed a game-high 10 rebounds in Chinese Taipei's preliminary round victory over Kuwait.
