= Yusuke Okada (basketball) =

Japanese basketball player

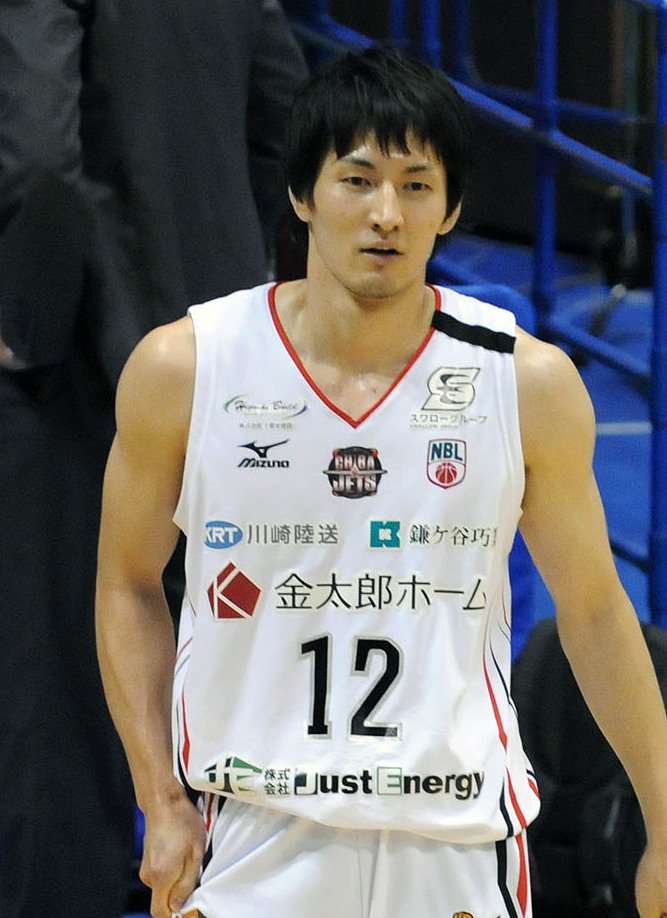

No. 10 – Altiri Chiba
- Position: Point guard
- League: B.League

Personal information
- Born: September 17, 1984 (age 42) Shinjuku, Tokyo, Japan
- Listed height: 6 ft 1 in (1.85 m)
- Listed weight: 176 lb (80 kg)

Career information
- High school: Tsuchiura Nihon University High
- College: Aoyama Gakuin University
- Playing career: 2007–present

Career history
- 2007-14: Toyota Alvark
- 2014: Tsukuba Robots
- 2015: Hiroshima Dragonflies
- 2015-16: Chiba Jets
- 2016-2020: Kyoto Hannaryz
- 2020-2021: Earthfriends Tokyo Z
- 2021-: Altiri Chiba

Career highlights
- B.League 3 Point Contest Winner (2018)
Medals
Men's basketball
Representing Japan
FIBA Asia Championship
Silver medal – second place	2009 Tianjin	Team competition
East Asian Games
Bronze medal – third place	2009 Hong Kong	Team competition

Yusuke Okada (岡田 優介, Okada Yūsuke; born September 17, 1984) is a Japanese professional basketball player. He plays for the Altiri Chiba of the B.League. Okada also is a member of the Japan national basketball team, debuting for the team in the FIBA Asia Championship 2009.

Okada averaged 8.9 points per game the Japanese team at the 2009 championship, including a game-high 30 points on 10 3-pointers in a 148-45 preliminary round victory over Sri Lanka. Despite his performance, Japan stumbled to a disappointing tenth-place finish, its worst ever performance in 24 FIBA Asia Championship appearances.

Okada played professionally with the Toyota Alvark of the JBL Super League. In the 2009–10 season, Okada entered the month-long winter break averaging 8.1 points per game for the Alvark.

== Certified Public Accountant ==
Okada earned Japanese CPA license in November 2010.

== 3x3 clubs ==
He owns Dime 3x3 teams in Tokyo, Osaka and Hachinohe.

== Career statistics ==
Legend
GP	Games played	GS	Games started	MPG	Minutes per game
FG%	Field goal percentage	3P%	3-point field goal percentage	FT%	Free throw percentage
RPG	Rebounds per game	APG	Assists per game	SPG	Steals per game
BPG	Blocks per game	PPG	Points per game	**Bold**	Career high

Year	Team	GP	GS	MPG	FG%	3P%	FT%	RPG	APG	SPG	BPG	PPG
2007–08	Toyota	30		9.9	.273	.247	.875	0.6	0.1	0.2	0.0	3.2
2008–09	Toyota	35		20.2	.418	.426	.708	1.2	0.8	0.6	0.1	9.5
2009–10	Toyota	41		19.1	.413	.438	.700	1.1	1.0	0.5	0.0	7.1
2010–11	Toyota	36		27.1	.386	.344	.824	1.4	0.9	0.4	0.1	9.3
2011–12	Toyota	42	42	23.3	.407	.390	.714	1.4	0.9	0.5	0.1	9.6
2012–13	Toyota	42	42	21.2	.377	.377	.667	1.3	0.8	0.4	0.1	8.2
2013–14	Toyota	54	54	18.9	.398	.415	.676	1.3	0.8	0.4	0.1	7.4
2014–15	Tsukuba	16	15	28.1	.297	.321	.783	1.4	1.2	1.0	0.0	8.7
2014–15	Hiroshima D	28	0	22.7	.322	.311	.775	2.4	1.7	0.6	0.0	7.7
2015–16	Chiba	54	34	21.3	.396	.400	.848	1.1	0.6	0.3	0.0	5.1
2016–17	Kyoto	60	60	28.0	.347	.349	.859	1.7	1.4	0.5	0.0	10.2
2017–18	Kyoto	60	60	23.5	.381	.359	.844	1.4	1.3	0.3	0.1	8.1
