= Kei Igarashi =

Japanese basketball player

No. 7 – Gunma Crane Thunders
- Position: Point guard
- League: B.League

Personal information
- Born: May 7, 1980 (age 46) Jōetsu, Niigata, Japan
- Listed height: 5 ft 11 in (1.80 m)
- Listed weight: 175 lb (79 kg)

Career information
- High school: Hokuriku
- College: Chuo University
- Playing career: 2003–present

Career history
- 2003-2009: Hitachi Sunrockers
- 2009-2010: Toyota Alvark
- 2010-2016: Mitsubishi Electric
- 2016-2021: Niigata Albirex BB
- 2021-present: Gunma Crane Thunders
Medals
Men's basketball
Representing Japan
FIBA Asia Championship
Silver medal – second place	2009 Tianjin	Team competition

Kei Igarashi (五十嵐 圭、born May 7, 1980 in Jōetsu, Niigata, Japan) is a Japanese professional basketball player. He plays for the Gunma Crane Thunders of the B.League. He also was a member of the Japan national basketball team, playing for the team in the 2006 FIBA World Championship and both the FIBA Asia Championship 2007 and FIBA Asia Championship 2009.

Igarashi averaged 9 points and 3 assists per game for the host Japanese at the 2006 FIBA World Championship. Igarashi scored a team-high 18 points and added three assists in Japan's lone win at the tournament, a 78-61 preliminary round victory over Panama. In his most recent, national team appearance, Igarashi had a team-leading 3.6 assists per game, good for third best overall in the tournament. Despite his performance, Japan stumbled to a disappointing tenth-place finish, its worst ever performance in 24 FIBA Asia Championship appearances.

In the 2009-10 season, he entered the month-long winter break averaging 9.3 points and 2.9 assists per game for the Alvark. The popular Igarashi was also named to the JBL All-Star Game as the leading point guard vote-getter for the East.
