= Erick Christopher Sebayang =

Indonesian basketball player

Personal information
- Born: July 30, 1983 (age 43) Indonesia
- Listed height: 5 ft 11 in (1.80 m)

Career information
- College: Perbanas Institute (2001-2005)
- Playing career: 2005–2015
- Position: Guard

Career history
- 2005-2013: Pelita Jaya
- 2013-2015: Satria Muda BritAma

Career highlights
- NBL Indonesia champion (2014); 3x Libama champion (2002-2004)

Erick Christopher Sebayang (born July 30, 1983 in Indonesia) is a retired Indonesian professional basketball player. He was known playing for Pelita Jaya Esia Jakarta of the Indonesian Basketball League. He is also a member of the Indonesia national basketball team.

Sebayang competed for the Indonesia national basketball team at the FIBA Asia Championship 2009 for the first time. He led the team in assists for the tournament with 1.6 per game.
