= Joji Takeuchi =

Japanese basketball player

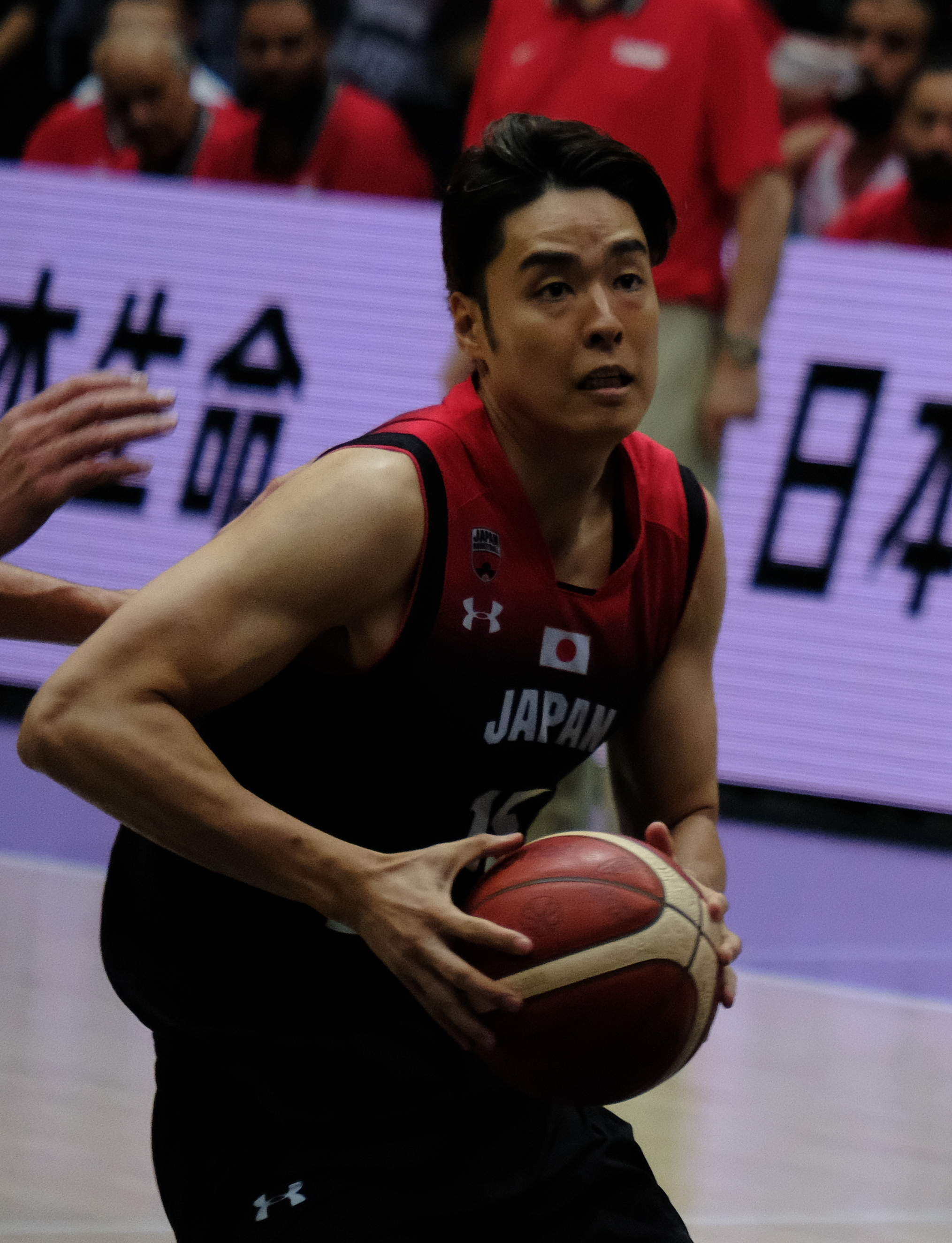

No. 15 – Osaka Evessa
- Position: Power forward / Center
- League: B.League

Personal information
- Born: January 29, 1985 (age 41) Suita, Osaka, Japan
- Listed height: 6 ft 9 in (2.06 m)
- Listed weight: 220 lb (100 kg)

Career information
- High school: Rakunan
- College: Tokai University
- Playing career: 2007–present

Career history
- 2007–2016: Hitachi SunRockers
- 2016–2021: Alvark Tokyo
- 2021–present: Osaka Evessa

Career highlights
- FIBA Asia Champions Cup champion (2019); 2× B.League champion (2018, 2019); NBL All-Star (2013)
Medals
Men's basketball
Representing Japan
East Asian Games
Bronze medal – third place	2009 Hong Kong	Team competition
Asian Games
Bronze medal – third place	2014 South Korea	Team competition
FIBA Asia Champions Cup
Silver medal – second place	2018 Thailand	Team
Gold medal – first place	2019 Thailand	Team

Joji Takeuchi (竹内 譲次、born January 29, 1985, in Suita, Osaka, Japan) is a Japanese professional basketball player. He plays for the Osaka Evessa of the B.League. Takeuchi also is a member of the Japan national basketball team, playing for the team in the 2006 FIBA World Championship and both the FIBA Asia Championship 2007 and FIBA Asia Championship 2009. Takeuchi's twin brother Kosuke is also a member of the Japanese national basketball team.

As a 21-year-old, Takeuchi averaged 6.2 points and 5.2 rebounds per game for the host Japanese at the 2006 FIBA World Championship. Takeuchi has earned a bigger role with the Japanese team over the past four years; his best tournament performance to date was at the FIBA Asia Championship 2009, in which he averaged 9.8 points and 7.2 rebounds per game. Despite his performance, Japan stumbled to a disappointing tenth-place finish, its worst ever performance in 24 FIBA Asia Championship appearances.

Takeuchi played professionally with the Hitachi SunRockers of the JBL Super League. In the 2009–10 season, Takeuchi entered the month-long winter break averaging 16.1 points and 9.4 rebounds per game for the third-place Seahorses. He was also named to the JBL All-Star Game as the leading power forward vote-getter for the East.

== Career statistics ==
Legend
GP	Games played	GS	Games started	MPG	Minutes per game
FG%	Field goal percentage	3P%	3-point field goal percentage	FT%	Free throw percentage
RPG	Rebounds per game	APG	Assists per game	SPG	Steals per game
BPG	Blocks per game	PPG	Points per game	**Bold**	Career high

Year	Team	GP	GS	MPG	FG%	3P%	FT%	RPG	APG	SPG	BPG	TO	PPG
2013-14	Hitachi	36		29.3	.513	.182	.667	9.3	2.2	0.7	1.0	1.7	12.3
2014-15	Hitachi	53		28.1	.557	.250	.758	8.2	2.0	0.9	0.7	1.6	12.5
2015-16	Hitachi	51		30.5	.496	.237	.716	7.8	1.9	1.0	1.2	1.5	12.3
2016-17	A Tokyo												
