= Talal Al-Nuaimi =

Emirati basketball player (born 1988)

Talal Salem
Personal information
- Born: September 26, 1988 (age 38) Dubai, United Arab Emirates
- Listed height: 5 ft 11 in (1.80 m)
- Position: Guard

Talal Salem Alnuaimi (born September 26, 1988 in Dubai) is a United Arab Emirates professional basketball player. He is a member of the United Arab Emirates national basketball team.

Al-Nuaimi competed for the United Arab Emirates national basketball team for the first time at the FIBA Asia Championship 2009. Despite being only 20 years old at the tournament, he averaged 10.8 points per game and led the team in minutes per game in helping the UAE to a 12th-place finish, their best showing since 2001.
