= Daiji Yamada =

Japanese basketball player

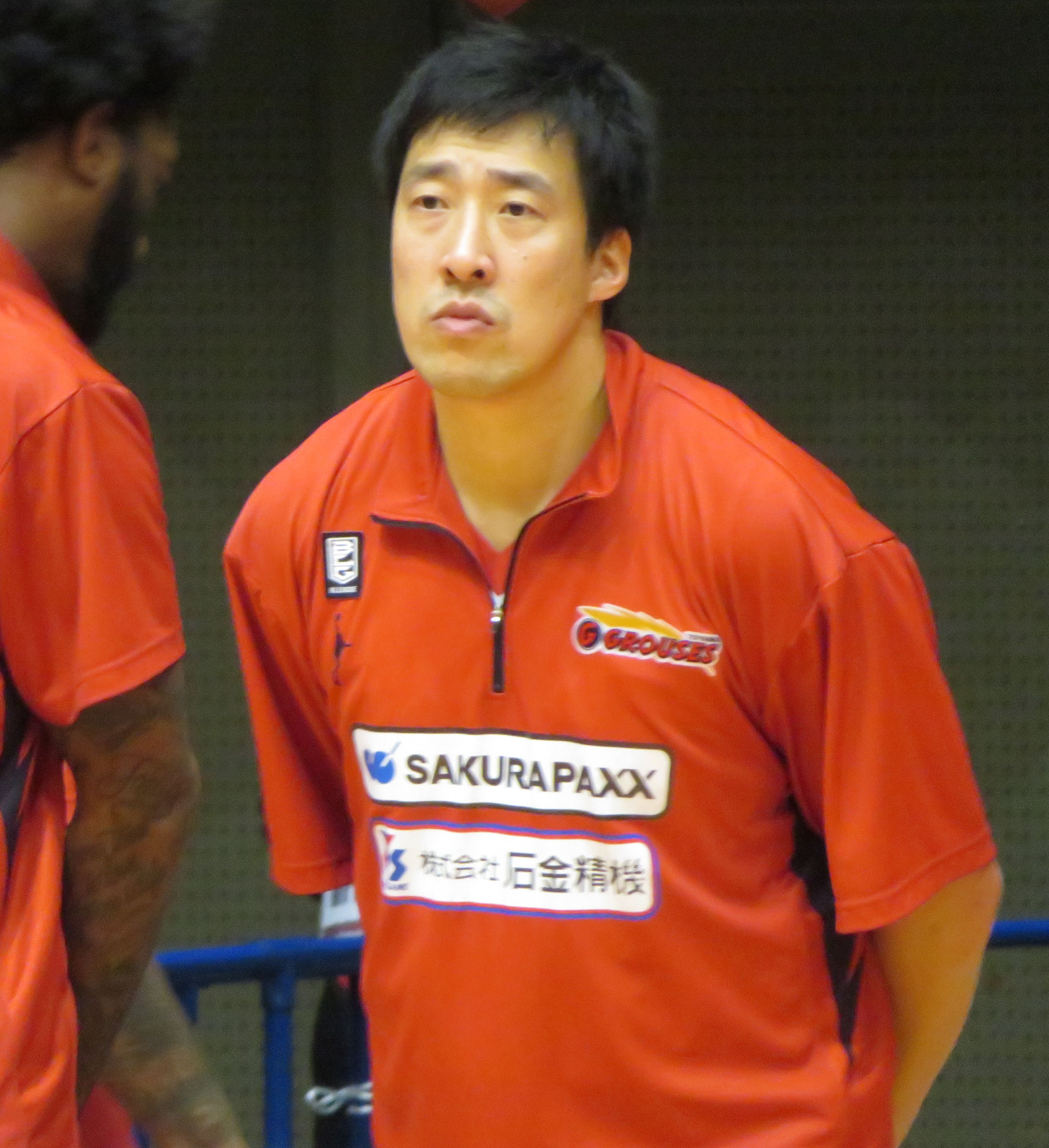

Personal information
- Born: June 8, 1981 (age 45) Osaka, Japan
- Listed height: 6 ft 6.75 in (2.00 m)
- Listed weight: 230 lb (104 kg)

Career information
- High school: Osaka
- College: Nihon University
- Playing career: 2004–2020
- Position: Power forward

Career history
- 2004–2007: Alvark Tokyo
- 2007–2008: Panasonic Trians
- 2008–2011: Levanga Hokkaido
- 2011–2016: Utsunomiya Brex
- 2016–2018: Hiroshima Dragonflies
- 2018–2020: Toyama Grouses
Medals
Representing Japan
FIBA Asia Championship
Silver medal – second place	2009 Tianjin	Team competition
William Jones Cup
Bronze medal – third place	2010 Taipei	Team

Daiji Yamada (山田 大治、born June 8, 1981) is a Japanese former professional basketball player. Yamada also was a long-time member of the Japan national basketball team, playing for the team in the 2006 FIBA World Championship and both the FIBA Asia Championship 2007 and FIBA Asia Championship 2009. He made his debut for the national team in 1999 at the FIBA World Championship for Junior Men

Yamada averaged 7 points and 2.3 rebounds per game for the host Japanese at the 2006 FIBA World Championship. In his most recent national team appearance, Yamada averaged 10 points and 4.6 rebounds per game for the Japanese at the FIBA Asia Championship 2009 tournament. Despite his performance, Japan stumbled to a disappointing tenth place finish, its worst ever performance in 24 FIBA Asia Championship appearances.

Yamada played professionally with Hokkaido in the JBL Super League. In the 2009-10 season, Yamada entered the month-long winter break averaging 14 points and 4.9 rebounds per game for the Alvark.
