= Rasheim Wright =

American-Jordanian basketball player (born 1981)

Personal information
- Born: July 21, 1981 (age 45) Philadelphia, Pennsylvania
- Listed height: 6 ft 4 in (1.93 m)
- Listed weight: 210 lb (95 kg)

Career information
- High school: Martin Luther King (Philadelphia, Pennsylvania)
- College: Gloucester CC (2001–2002); District of Columbia (2002–2004)
- NBA draft: 2005: undrafted
- Playing career: 2005–2020
- Position: Guard
- Number: 23

Career history
- 2005: KK Bosna
- 2005: Tulsa 66ers
- 2005–2006: Tijuana Dragons
- 2006: Rome Gladiators
- 2006–2007: Al Mouttahed Tripoli
- 2007–2008: Zain Club
- 2008: Zamalek SC
- 2008–2009: TTNet Beykoz
- 2009: Zain Club
- 2010: Mahram
- 2010: Philippine Patriots
- 2011–2012: Anibal Zahle
- 2012: Melli Haffari Ahvaz
- 2012–2013: Al-Karkh SC
- 2013: Al-Gharafa
- 2013: İstanbul BŞB
- 2013: Al Hala
- 2014: Al-Nasr
- 2014: Zakho SC
- 2014: Al-Fateh
- 2014–2015: Al Ittihad Amman
- 2015–2016: Ittihad Tanger
- 2017–2018: CS Antonine
- 2018: Guaiqueríes de Margarita
- 2020: Aragats
Medals
Men's basketball
Representing Jordan
FIBA Asia Championship
Bronze medal – third place	2009 Tianjin	Team
Silver medal – second place	2011 Wuhan	Team
William Jones Cup
Gold medal – first place	2007 Taipei	Team

Rasheim Ali Abdul Wright (born July 21, 1981) is an American-Jordanian basketball player. He is 6'4" and plays the guard position. In 2007, he received Jordanian citizenship.

== National team career ==
=== 2007 FIBA Asia Championship ===
Wright debuted at the 2007 FIBA Asia Championship, a qualification tournament for the 2008 Summer Olympics. He led his team with an average of 18.1 ppg in that tournament, though Jordan was eliminated in the quarterfinals.

=== 2009 FIBA Asia Championship ===
Wright played with the Jordanian national team in the 2009 FIBA Asia Championship he led his team to reach the semifinals before losing to Iran, 75–77. In the bronze medal match, he helped Jordan beat Lebanon, 80–66, to clinch a spot for the 2010 FIBA World Championship.
