= Mohammad Ashkanani =

Kuwaiti professional basketball player

Kazma
- Position: Forward
- League: Kuwait Basketball League

Personal information
- Born: February 5, 1984 (age 42) Kuwait
- Listed height: 6 ft 4 in (1.93 m)

Mohammad Ashkanani (born February 5, 1984, in Kuwait) is a Kuwaiti professional basketball player. He plays for Kazma of the Kuwait basketball league. He is also a member of the Kuwait national basketball team.

Ashkanani competed for the Kuwait national basketball team at both the FIBA Asia Championship 2007 and FIBA Asia Championship 2009. At the 2007 tournament, he played sparingly off the bench for the 15th placed Kuwait team. In 2009, he received more playing time and averaged 14.2 points and 7 rebounds per game, leading the team in both categories, as the Kuwaiti team improved to an 11th-place finish.
