= Kosuke Takeuchi =

Japanese basketball player

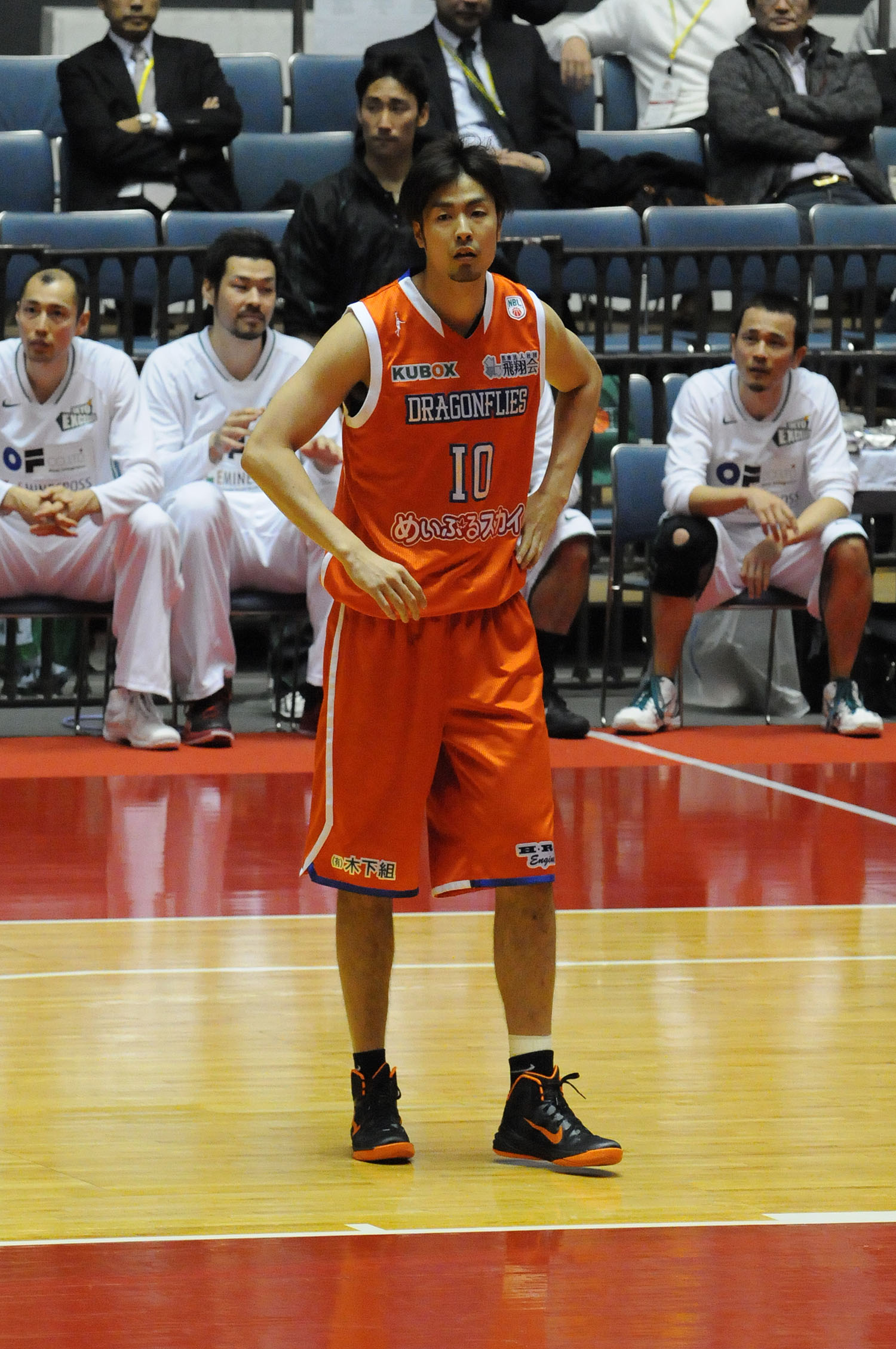

No. 10 – Utsunomiya Brex
- Position: Power forward / Center
- League: B.League

Personal information
- Born: January 29, 1985 (age 41) Suita, Osaka, Japan
- Listed height: 6 ft 9 in (2.06 m)
- Listed weight: 220 lb (100 kg)

Career information
- High school: Rakunan
- College: Keio University
- Playing career: 2007–present

Career history
- 2007–2011: SeaHorses Mikawa
- 2011–2014: Alvark Tokyo
- 2014–2016: Hiroshima Dragonflies
- 2016–present: Utsunomiya Brex

Career highlights
- B.League Champion (2025)
Medals
Men's basketball
Representing Japan
Asian Games
Bronze medal – third place	2014 South Korea	Team competition
East Asian Games
Bronze medal – third place	2009 Hong Kong	Team competition
FIBA Asia Challenge
Silver medal – second place	2010 Beirut	Team
Silver medal – second place	2012 Tokyo	Team
EABA Championship
Bronze medal – third place	2017 Nagano	Team

Kosuke Takeuchi (竹内 公輔、born January 29, 1985 in Suita, Osaka, Japan) is a Japanese professional basketball player. He plays for the Utsunomiya Brex of the B.League. Takeuchi also is a member of the Japan national basketball team, playing for the team in the 2006 FIBA World Championship and both the FIBA Asia Championship 2007 and FIBA Asia Championship 2009. Takeuchi's twin brother Joji is also a member of the Japanese national basketball team.

As a 21-year-old, Takeuchi averaged 5.4 points and 4.4 rebounds per game for the host Japanese at the 2006 FIBA World Championship. Takeuchi has earned a bigger role with the Japanese team over the past four years; his best tournament performance to date was at the FIBA Asia Championship 2009, in which he averaged 13 points and a team-leading 8.2 rebounds per game. Despite his performance, Japan stumbled to a disappointing tenth-place finish, its worst ever performance in 24 FIBA Asia Championship appearances. He was invited to play with the Minnesota Timberwolves during the 2010 summer league in Las Vegas in 2010.

Takeuchi played professionally with the Aisin Seahorses of the JBL Super League. In the 2009-10 season, Takeuchi entered the month-long winter break averaging 15.4 points and 11.3 rebounds per game for the first-place Seahorses. He was also named to the JBL All-Star Game as the leading power forward vote-getter for the West.

== Career statistics ==
Legend
GP	Games played	GS	Games started	MPG	Minutes per game
FG%	Field goal percentage	3P%	3-point field goal percentage	FT%	Free throw percentage
RPG	Rebounds per game	APG	Assists per game	SPG	Steals per game
BPG	Blocks per game	PPG	Points per game	**Bold**	Career high

=== Regular season ===
Year	Team	GP	GS	MPG	FG%	3P%	FT%	RPG	APG	SPG	BPG	TO	PPG
JBL 2007-08	Aisin	35		35.3	.549	.415	.719	9.7	1.1	0.8	1.8	1.2	14.3
JBL 2008-09	Aisin	35		37.7	.565	.403	.805	10.0	1.1	0.6	1.9	1.6	18.3
JBL 2009-10	Aisin	42		38.0	.539	.246	.661	11.0	1.2	0.8	2.0	1.6	15.8
JBL 2010-11	Aisin	36		37.2	.578	.353	.741	11.0	1.6	0.6	1.8	1.8	16.8
JBL 2011-12	Toyota	36		23.3	.543	.000	.727	6.8	1.2	0.5	1.2	1.1	10.6
JBL 2012-13	Toyota	38		25.2	.472	.000	.605	7.2	0.9	0.7	1.0	1.2	9.3
NBL 2013-14	Toyota	37	18	21.6	.607	.333	.676	6.8	0.7	0.5	0.8	0.9	10.7
NBL 2014-15	Hiroshima	46		31.8	.526	.357	.771	8.4	1.4	0.7	0.9	1.3	14.0
NBL 2015-16	Hiroshima												
