= Tianjin Arena =

Sports venue in Tianjin, China

Coordinates: 39°4′35″N 117°10′18″E

Tianjin Sports Center 天津体育中心
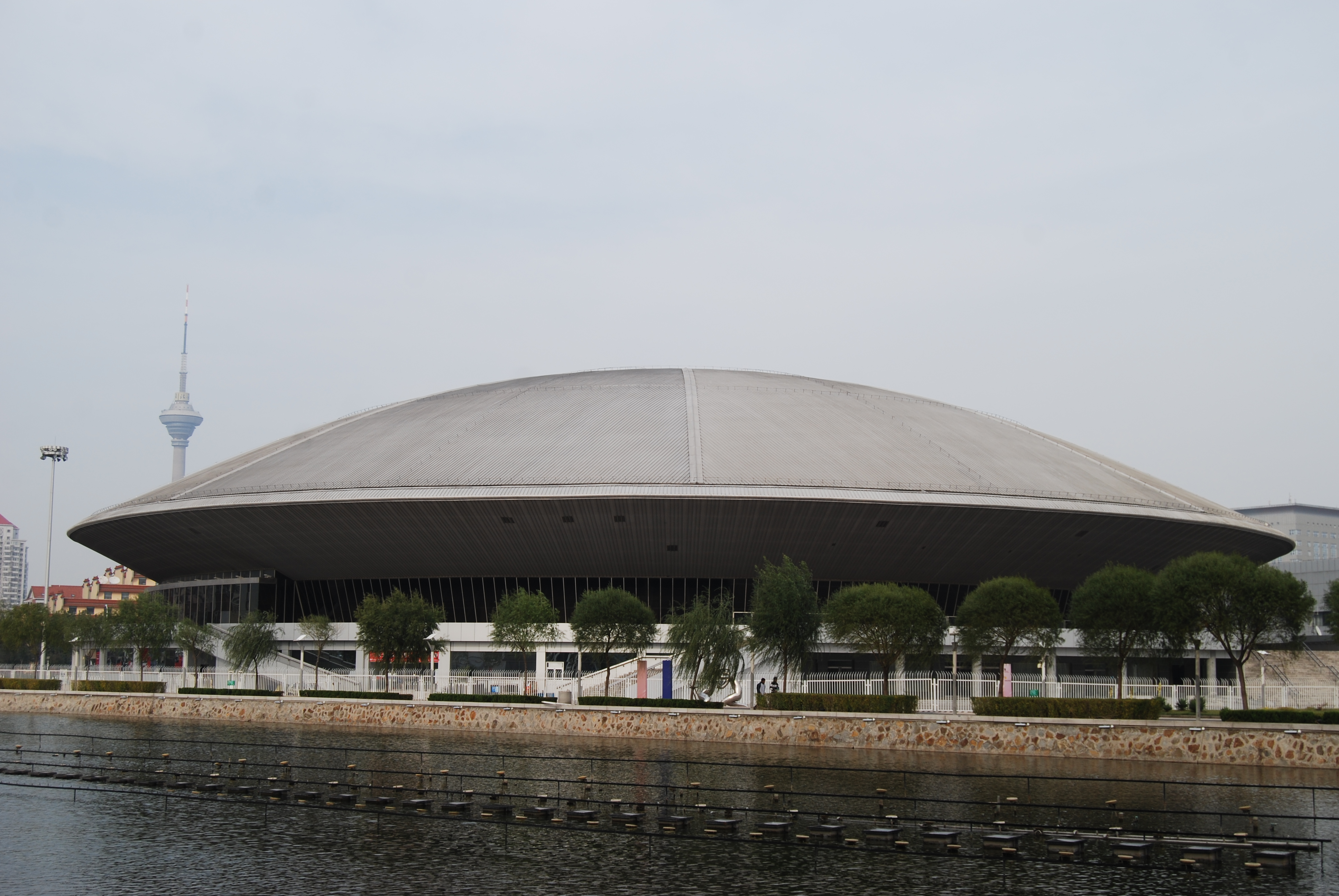
- Interactive map of Tianjin Sports Center 天津体育中心
- Location: Tianjin, China
- Owner: Tianjin Government
- Capacity: 10,000

Construction
- Opened: 1995

Tenants
- Tianjin Pioneers (CBA) (2008-present); Tianjin Pirates (CNFL) (2015-present)

Tianjin Arena (simplified Chinese: 天津体育馆; traditional Chinese: 天津體育館; pinyin: Tiānjīn Tǐyùguǎn) is an indoor sporting arena located in Tianjin Sports Center, Tianjin, China. The capacity of the arena is 10,000 spectators. The arena is used to host indoor sporting events, such as basketball and volleyball.

The hall hosted some for the 1999 World Artistic Gymnastics Championships.

== See also ==
- List of indoor arenas in China
