= Lee Jung-suk =

South Korean basketball player

Lee Jung-Suk
Personal information
- Born: July 6, 1982 (age 44) South Korea
- Listed height: 6 ft 1 in (1.85 m)
- Listed weight: 192 lb (87 kg)

Career information
- High school: Yongsan High School
- College: Yonsei University
- Playing career: 2004–2018
- Position: Guard

Career history
- 2004–2005: Anyang SBS Stars
- 2005–2015: Seoul Samsung Thunders
- 2015–2017: Seoul SK Knights
- 2017–2018: Ulsan Hyundai Mobis Phoebus

Career highlights
- KBL Championship (2006); 2x KBL Defensive Best 5 (2009, 2010)
Medals
Representing South Korea
Men's basketball
Asian Games
Silver medal – second place	2010 Guangzhou	Team

- Lee Jung-suk
- Hangul: 이정석
- Hanja: 李政錫
- RR: I Jeongseok
- MR: I Chŏngsŏk

Lee Jung-Suk (born July 6, 1982 in South Korea) is a South Korean retired professional basketball player. He spent most of his playing career at the Seoul Samsung Thunders of the Korean Basketball League and also played for the South Korean national team at the 2009 FIBA Asia Championship and the 2010 Asian Games.

== Career ==
=== Early years ===
Lee attended Yongsan High School where he was a junior of Yang Dong-geun. He played college basketball for Yonsei University.

=== Professional ===
Lee was selected by Anyang SBS Stars in the 2004 KBL draft as the second overall pick. The team finished third in the regular season and advanced to the semi-finals of the play-offs. He was traded to Seoul Samsung Thunders for Joo Hee-jung at the end of the season.

Lee spent the next decade at Seoul Samsung Thunders. During the team's successful run to the 2005–06 championship, he was a core member of a formidable squad that included Kang Hyuk, Lee Kyu-sup and Seo Jang-hoon. Due to Lee Kyu-sup and Seo's height (both were over 6 feet and 6 inches tall), the team's quick and physical offensive style was nicknamed "high altitude basketball" by the press. That team was dubbed "Guard Kingdom" by fans because of their strong depth chart consisting of guards who possessed physicality, shooting prowess and defensive ability.

== National team ==
At the 2009 FIBA Asia Championship, Lee helped the Koreans to a seventh-place finish while averaging a team-leading three assists per game. Despite his efforts, Korea failed to qualify for the semifinals of the tournament for the first time in their 25 tournament appearances.
