= Mustafa Al-Sayyad =

Qatari basketball player (born 1982)

Mustafa Al-Sayyad مصطفي الصياد
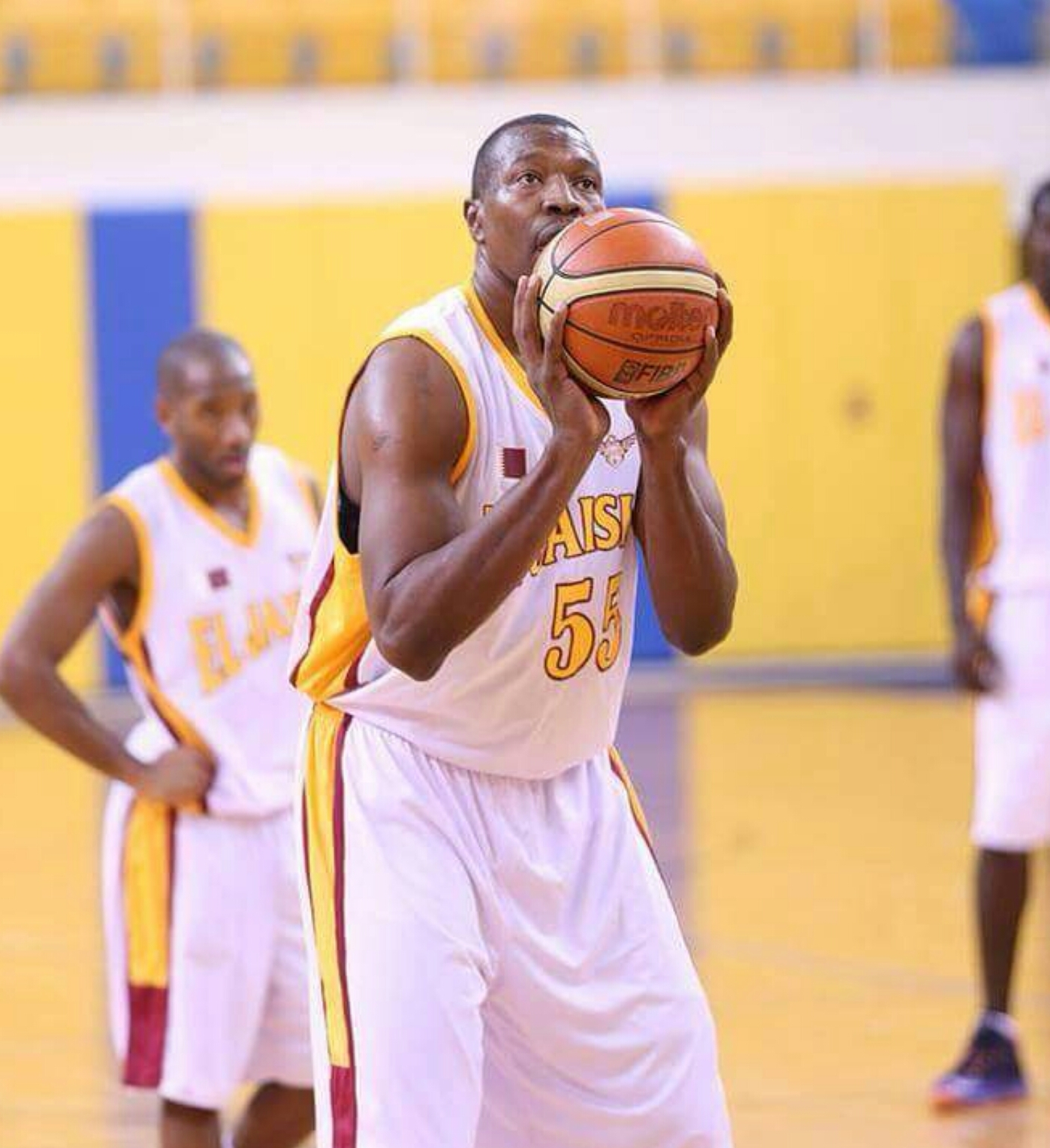

Personal information
- Born: September 13, 1982 (age 44) Khartoum, Sudan
- Listed height: 6 ft 9 in (2.06 m)
- Listed weight: 240 lb (109 kg)

Career information
- High school: Washington College Academy
- College: Fresno State (2000–2005)
- NBA draft: 2005: undrafted
- Playing career: 1997–1999; 2005–2014
- Position: Center

Career history
- 1997–1999: Al Arabi
- 2006–2007: Tulsa 66ers
- 2007–2008: Al Wakrah
- 2008: Bakersfield Jam
- 2009–2010: Al Arabi
- 2013–2014: El Jaish

Mustafa Al-Sayyad Rahman (born September 13, 1982) is a professional basketball player. He last played for Bakersfield Jam of the NBA Development League. He is also a member of the Qatar national basketball team.

Originally from Sudan, Elsayyad competed for the Qatar national basketball team at the FIBA Asian Championship for junior men in 1998 in Calcutta, India. He also participated with Qatar in the FIBA World Championship for Junior men in 1999 in Porto, Aveiro, Almada, Faro, Lisbon, Portugal. He averaged 12 points and 6.4 rebounds per game for Qatar at the tournament. Despite his efforts, Qatar finished sixth in the tournament and failed to qualify for their second consecutive FIBA World Championship.

Mustafa Al-Sayyad (born September 13, 1982) is a retired professional basketball player. Alsayyad went undrafted at the 2005 NBA draft then he joined the NBA Development league and played for played for the Bakersfield Jam 2008 season and for the Tulsa 66ers 2007 season # 55.. He is also a member of the Qatar national basketball team.

Originally from Sudan, Al Sayyad competed for the Qatar national basketball team in the 25th FIBA Asian basketball tournament in Tenjin China # 55 (Mustafa Elsayad) Averaging 12 ppg and 6.4 Rpg. Despite his efforts, Qatar finished sixth in the tournament and failed to qualify for their second consecutive FIBA World Championship.

He also played for the FIBA Asian Championship for junior men in 1998 in Calcutta, India. He also participated with Qatar in the FIBA World Championship for Junior men in 1999 in Porto, Aveiro, Almada, Faro, Lisbon, Portugal.[1]

Alsayyad played for the Qatari basketball league for Al Arabi Sports Club 1998–1999, 2009–2010. and El Jaish Sports club 2013,2014.
