= 2025 CBA Playoffs =

Postseason of 2024–25 CBA season

2025 CBA playoffs
Tournament details
- Dates: 4 April – 20 May 2025
- Season: 2024–25
- Teams: 12

Final positions
- Champions: Zhejiang Lions (1st title)
- Runners-up: Beijing Ducks
- Semifinalists: Shanxi Loongs; Liaoning Flying Leopards

The 2025 CBA Playoffs was the postseason tournament of the Chinese Basketball Association's 2024–25 season. It began on 4 April 2025.

== Bracket ==
First round Best-of-three
8	Qingdao Eagles	2
9	Zhejiang Golden Bulls	1
5	Xinjiang Flying Tigers	2
12	Nanjing Monkey Kings	0
7	Guangdong Southern Tigers	2
10	Shanghai Sharks	1
6	Shandong Hi-Speed Kirin	0
11	Beijing Royal Fighters	2

Quarter-finals; Best-of-five
1	Zhejiang Lions	3
8	Qingdao Eagles	2
4	Liaoning Flying Leopards	3
5	Xinjiang Flying Tigers	0
2	Shanxi Loongs	3
7	Guangdong Southern Tigers	0
3	Beijing Ducks	3
11	Beijing Royal Fighters	1

Semi-finals; Best-of-five
1	Zhejiang Lions	3
4	Liaoning Flying Leopards	0
2	Shanxi Loongs	0
3	Beijing Ducks	3

Finals; Best-of-seven
1	Zhejiang Lions	4
3	Beijing Ducks	2

== First round ==
=== (5) Xinjiang Flying Tigers vs. (12) Nanjing Monkey Kings ===
4 April 2025

boxscore

Xinjiang Flying Tigers	118–111	Nanjing Monkey Kings
Scoring by quarter: 32–27, 34–24, 29–34, 23–26
Pts: Qi 25; Rebs: Abdurixit 9 Asts: Hagans 8		Pts: Lin 37; Rebs: Fall 12; Asts: Lin 11
Xinjiang leads series, 1–0

Hongshan Arena, Ürümqi, Xinjiang

7 April 2025

boxscore

Nanjing Monkey Kings	108–113	Xinjiang Flying Tigers
Scoring by quarter: 33–30, 24–15, 23–44, 28–24
Pts: Lin 24; Rebs: Lin, Zeng 8 Asts: Lin 11		Pts: Lawson 24; Rebs: Lawson 13; Asts: Hagans 15
Xinjiang won series, 2–0

Nanjing Olympic Sports Center, Nanjing, Jiangsu

=== (6) Shandong Hi-Speed Kirin vs. (11) Beijing Royal Fighters ===
5 April 2025

boxscore

Shandong Hi-Speed Kirin	99–104	Beijing Royal Fighters
Scoring by quarter: 17–24, 21–32, 32–23, 29–25
Pts: Gailey 23; Rebs: Tao 10; Asts: Gailey 9		Pts: Riller 30; Rebs: Sullinger 14; Asts: Riller, Sullinger 6
Beijing RF leads series, 1–0

Shandong Arena, Jinan, Shandong

8 April 2025

boxscore

Beijing Royal Fighters	93–84	Shandong Hi-Speed Kirin
Scoring by quarter: 22–19, 23–18, 22–17, 26–30
Pts: Riller 24; Rebs: Sullinger 14; Asts: Riller 8		Pts: Moore 20; Rebs: Chriss, Gao 6 Asts: Gao 6
Beijing RF won series, 2–0

Olympic Sports Center, Beijing

=== (7) Guangdong Southern Tigers vs. (10) Shanghai Sharks ===
5 April 2025

boxscore

Guangdong Southern Tigers	102–98	Shanghai Sharks
Scoring by quarter: 24–25, 20–15, 22–29, 36–29
Pts: Hu 31; Rebs: Moreland 13; Asts: Hu, Xu 6		Pts: Wang 22; Rebs: Lofton 9 Asts: Lofton 8
Guangdong leads series, 1–0

Dongguan Basketball Center, Dongguan, Guangdong

8 April 2025

boxscore

Shanghai Sharks	104–103 (OT)	Guangdong Southern Tigers
Scoring by quarter: 26–23, 20–28, 18–14, 26–25, Overtime: 14–13
Pts: Harvey 33; Rebs: Wang 13; Asts: Harvey, Li 4		Pts: Gillenwater 26; Rebs: Gillenwater 11; Asts: Gillenwater, Ren 5
Series tied, 1–1

Shanghai Indoor Stadium, Shanghai

11 April 2025

boxscore

Guangdong Southern Tigers	115–92	Shanghai Sharks
Scoring by quarter: 37–26, 33–27, 26–18, 19–21
Pts: Xu 25; Rebs: Moreland 11; Asts: Xu 11		Pts: Lofton 24; Rebs: Hongquan 10; Asts: Lofton 9
Guangdong won series, 2–1

Dongguan Basketball Center, Dongguan, Guangdong

=== (8) Qingdao Eagles vs. (9) Zhejiang Golden Bulls ===
4 April 2025

boxscore

Qingdao Eagles	112–96	Zhejiang Golden Bulls
Scoring by quarter: 29–24, 27–32, 31–27, 25–13
Pts: Wang 36; Rebs: Weatherspoon 7 Asts: Weatherspoon 11		Pts: York 30; Rebs: Yu 12; Asts: Wu 8
Qingdao leads series, 1–0

Conson Gymnasium, Qingdao, Shandong

7 April 2025

boxscore

Zhejiang Golden Bulls	104–81	Qingdao Eagles
Scoring by quarter: 22–28, 28–11, 32–23, 22–19
Pts: Yu 25; Rebs: Jones 18; Asts: Wu 7		Pts: Mickey 15; Rebs: Mickey 9 Asts: Mickey 6
Series tied, 1–1

Binjiang Gymnasium, Hangzhou, Zhejiang

10 April 2025

boxscore

Qingdao Eagles	103–91	Zhejiang Golden Bulls
Scoring by quarter: 24–13, 28–24, 30–33, 21–21
Pts: Weatherspoon, Yang 24; Rebs: Weatherspoon 12; Asts: Weatherspoon 12		Pts: York 28; Rebs: Jones 11; Asts: York 8
Qingdao won series, 2–1

Conson Gymnasium, Qingdao, Shandong

== Quarter-finals ==
=== (1) Zhejiang Lions vs. (8) Qingdao Eagles ===
13 April 2025

boxscore

Zhejiang Lions	110–93	Qingdao Eagles
Scoring by quarter: 24–20, 33–18, 28–27, 25–28
Pts: Brown 31; Rebs: Carlton 11; Asts: Brown 6		Pts: Wang 19; Rebs: Mickey 9 Asts: Weatherspoon 7
Zhejiang L leads series, 1–0

Zhuji Sports Center, Shaoxing, Zhejiang

15 April 2025

boxscore

Zhejiang Lions	96–116	Qingdao Eagles
Scoring by quarter: 27–29, 14–33, 28–23, 27–31
Pts: Brown 36; Rebs: Knight 6 Asts: Sun 8		Pts: Mickey 34; Rebs: Mickey 10; Asts: Weatherspoon 11
Series tied, 1–1

Zhuji Sports Center, Shaoxing, Zhejiang

18 April 2025

boxscore

Qingdao Eagles	85–83	Zhejiang Lions
Scoring by quarter: 22–12, 20–21, 23–25, 20–25
Pts: Weatherspoon 30; Rebs: Wang, Yang 11; Asts: Weatherspoon 5		Pts: Brown 25; Rebs: Hu, Knight 8 Asts: Brown, Sun 5
Qingdao leads series, 2–1

Conson Stadium, Qingdao, Shandong

20 April 2025

boxscore

Qingdao Eagles	108–110	Zhejiang Lions
Scoring by quarter: 29–16, 21–35, 29–25, 29–34
Pts: Powell 22; Rebs: Mickey 13; Asts: Powell 10		Pts: Brown 28; Rebs: Carlton 11; Asts: Brown 9
Series tied, 2–2

Conson Stadium, Qingdao, Shandong

23 April 2025

boxscore

Zhejiang Lions	101–96	Qingdao Eagles
Scoring by quarter: 28–29, 25–19, 26–22, 22–26
Pts: Hu 19; Rebs: Hu 10; Asts: Sun 10		Pts: Weatherspoon 24; Rebs: Yang 11; Asts: Mickey, Weatherspoon 8
Zhejiang L won series, 3–2

Zhuji Sports Center, Shaoxing, Zhejiang

=== (2) Shanxi Loongs vs. (7) Guangdong Southern Tigers ===
14 April 2025

boxscore

Shanxi Loongs	123–81	Guangdong Southern Tigers
Scoring by quarter: 31–27, 38–25, 22–15, 32–14
Pts: Goodwin 25; Rebs: Goodwin 8 Asts: Diallo, Goodwin 6		Pts: Gillenwater 19; Rebs: Moreland 9 Asts: Hu, Xu 6
Shanxi leads series, 1–0

Shanxi Sports Center, Taiyuan, Shanxi

16 April 2025

boxscore

Shanxi Loongs	116–101	Guangdong Southern Tigers
Scoring by quarter: 29–36, 32–7, 26–33, 29–25
Pts: Yuan 29; Rebs: Liu 11; Asts: Goodwin 9		Pts: Xu 23; Rebs: Bazley 10; Asts: Xu 6
Shanxi leads series, 2–0

Shanxi Sports Center, Taiyuan, Shanxi

19 April 2025

boxscore

Guangdong Southern Tigers	106–124	Shanxi Loongs
Scoring by quarter: 28–31, 40–35, 19–37, 19–21
Pts: Gillenwater 36; Rebs: Zhang 7 Asts: Burke 8		Pts: Diallo 25; Rebs: Diallo 12; Asts: Jia 7
Shanxi won series, 3–0

Dongguan Basketball Center, Dongguan, Guangdong

=== (3) Beijing Ducks vs. (11) Beijing Royal Fighters ===
14 April 2025

boxscore

Beijing Ducks	98–105	Beijing Royal Fighters
Scoring by quarter: 22–26, 29–27, 24–23, 23–29
Pts: Nutall 18; Rebs: Solomon 15; Asts: Nutall 7		Pts: Riller 31; Rebs: Sullinger 14; Asts: Sullinger 5
Beijing RF leads series, 1–0

Cadillac Arena, Beijing

16 April 2025

boxscore

Beijing Ducks	106–100	Beijing Royal Fighters
Scoring by quarter: 30–29, 21–29, 34–23, 21–19
Pts: Zeng 30; Rebs: Solomon 9 Asts: German 8		Pts: Sullinger, Zou 21; Rebs: Sullinger 10; Asts: Riller 7
Series tied, 1–1

Cadillac Arena, Beijing

19 April 2025

boxscore

Beijing Royal Fighters	102–105	Beijing Ducks
Scoring by quarter: 20–22, 24–27, 29–33, 29–23
Pts: Shen 31; Rebs: Sullinger 12; Asts: Sullinger 6		Pts: German 19; Rebs: Solomon 13; Asts: German 8
Beijing D leads series, 2–1

Olympic Sports Center, Beijing

21 April 2025

boxscore

Beijing Royal Fighters	95–112	Beijing Ducks
Scoring by quarter: 21–29, 26–24, 19–28, 29–31
Pts: Riller 27; Rebs: Sullinger 7 Asts: Riller 7		Pts: German 25; Rebs: Solomon 13; Asts: Chen 7
Beijing D won series, 3–1

Olympic Sports Center, Beijing

=== (4) Liaoning Flying Leopards vs. (5) Xinjiang Flying Tigers ===
13 April 2025

boxscore

Liaoning Flying Leopards	123–116 (OT)	Xinjiang Flying Tigers
Scoring by quarter: 30–19, 25–30, 22–27, 34–35, Overtime: 12–5
Pts: Zhao 33; Rebs: Oliver 13; Asts: Fogg, Wells 6		Pts: Lawson 32; Rebs: Lawson 12; Asts: Ge, Hagans, Harrell 5
Liaoning leads series, 1–0

Liaoning Gymnasium, Shenyang, Liaoning

15 April 2025

boxscore

Liaoning Flying Leopards	105–96	Xinjiang Flying Tigers
Scoring by quarter: 36–26, 23–12, 20–31, 26–27
Pts: Wells 21; Rebs: Fu, Oliver 8 Asts: Zhao 10		Pts: Monhetaner 25; Rebs: Lawson 16; Asts: Lawson 7
Liaoning leads series, 2–0

Liaoning Gymnasium, Shenyang, Liaoning

18 April 2025

boxscore

Xinjiang Flying Tigers	79–101	Liaoning Flying Leopards
Scoring by quarter: 24–24, 22–25, 15–26, 18–26
Pts: Hagans 20; Rebs: Lawson 11; Asts: Hagans 7		Pts: Wells 25; Rebs: Oliver, Wells 9 Asts: Wells 8
Liaoning won series, 3–0

Hongshan Arena, Ürümqi, Xinjiang

== Semi-finals ==
=== (1) Zhejiang Lions vs. (4) Liaoning Flying Leopards ===
26 April 2025

boxscore

Zhejiang Lions	109–90	Liaoning Flying Leopards
Scoring by quarter: 34–22, 25–15, 25–28, 25–25
Pts: Brown 24; Rebs: Knight, Zhu 9 Asts: Brown 6		Pts: Fogg 20; Rebs: Oliver 12; Asts: Zhao 5
Zhejiang L leads series, 1–0

Zhuji Sports Center, Shaoxing, Zhejiang

28 April 2025

boxscore

Zhejiang Lions	110–84	Liaoning Flying Leopards
Scoring by quarter: 28–21, 30–21, 31–17, 21–25
Pts: Brown 30; Rebs: Knight 10; Asts: Brown 9		Pts: Fu 20; Rebs: Li 9 Asts: Zhao 5
Zhejiang L leads series, 2–0

Zhuji Sports Center, Shaoxing, Zhejiang

1 May 2025

boxscore

Liaoning Flying Leopards	98–109	Zhejiang Lions
Scoring by quarter: 33–26, 21–41, 18–26, 26–16
Pts: Wells, Zhao 17; Rebs: Li 7 Asts: Zhao 5		Pts: Hu 36; Rebs: Hu 10; Asts: Brown, Sun 9
Zhejiang L won series, 3–0

Liaoning Gymnasium, Shenyang, Liaoning

=== (2) Shanxi Loongs vs. (3) Beijing Ducks ===
27 April 2025

boxscore

Shanxi Loongs	94–102	Beijing Ducks
Scoring by quarter: 27–23, 24–33, 27–18, 16–28
Pts: Goodwin 22; Rebs: Liu 10; Asts: Diallo 5		Pts: Chen, German 23; Rebs: Qi 10; Asts: Chen 10
Beijing D leads series, 1–0

Shanxi Sports Center, Taiyuan, Shanxi

29 April 2025

boxscore

Shanxi Loongs	99–106	Beijing Ducks
Scoring by quarter: 24–28, 25–27, 18–28, 32–23
Pts: Diallo 28; Rebs: Diallo 12; Asts: Goodwin 7		Pts: Chen 23; Rebs: Zhai 9 Asts: German 15
Beijing D leads series, 2–0

Shanxi Sports Center, Taiyuan, Shanxi

2 May 2025

boxscore

Beijing Ducks	121–103	Shanxi Loongs
Scoring by quarter: 33–34, 28–26, 40–18, 20–25
Pts: German 43; Rebs: Qi 11; Asts: Chen 8		Pts: Goodwin 32; Rebs: Liu 9 Asts: Goodwin 8
Beijing D won series, 3–0

Cadillac Arena, Beijing

== Finals ==
=== (1) Zhejiang Lions vs. (3) Beijing Ducks ===
7 May 2025

boxscore

Zhejiang Lions	87–101	Beijing Ducks
Scoring by quarter: 34–24, 21–31, 23–26, 9–20
Pts: Hu 26; Rebs: Hu 8 Asts: Brown 6		Pts: German 24; Rebs: Zhou 14; Asts: German 7
Beijing D leads series, 1–0

Zhuji Sports Center, Shaoxing, Zhejiang

9 May 2025

boxscore

Zhejiang Lions	103–96	Beijing Ducks
Scoring by quarter: 23–22, 28–24, 23–27, 29–23
Pts: Brown 31; Rebs: Sun 9 Asts: Brown 7		Pts: German 21; Rebs: Zhou 10; Asts: Chen 5
Series tied, 1–1

Zhuji Sports Center, Shaoxing, Zhejiang

12 May 2025

boxscore

Beijing Ducks	103–114	Zhejiang Lions
Scoring by quarter: 28–31, 34–20, 22–28, 19–35
Pts: Zhou 26; Rebs: Zhou 13; Asts: German 14		Pts: Brown 44; Rebs: Carlton 10; Asts: Brown 7
Zhejiang L leads series, 2–1

Capital Indoor Stadium, Beijing

14 May 2025

boxscore

Beijing Ducks	73–106	Zhejiang Lions
Scoring by quarter: 14–25, 21–28, 17–29, 21–24
Pts: Chen 13; Rebs: Solomon 9 Asts: Fang 6		Pts: Brown, Lin 22; Rebs: Carlton 6 Asts: Brown 6
Zhejiang L leads series, 3–1

Capital Indoor Stadium, Beijing

17 May 2025

boxscore

Zhejiang Lions	92–94	Beijing Ducks
Scoring by quarter: 22–27, 30–20, 22–31, 18–16
Pts: Brown, Hu 27; Rebs: Hu 14; Asts: Brown 9		Pts: German 21; Rebs: Zhou 13; Asts: German 9
Zhejiang L leads series, 3–2

Zhuji Sports Center, Shaoxing, Zhejiang

20 May 2025

boxscore

Beijing Ducks	118–125	Zhejiang Lions
Scoring by quarter: 36–29, 21–40, 38–30, 23–26
Pts: Zhou 31; Rebs: Zhou 10; Asts: German 13		Pts: Brown 41; Rebs: Zhu 7 Asts: Sun 10
Zhejiang L won series, 4–2

Capital Indoor Stadium, Beijing
