= JD Notae =

American basketball player

No. 00 – Bàsquet Manresa
- Position: Point guard
- League: Liga ACB; EuroCup

Personal information
- Born: October 27, 1998 (age 28) Covington, Georgia, U.S.
- Listed height: 6 ft 2 in (1.88 m)
- Listed weight: 190 lb (86 kg)

Career information
- High school: Newton (Covington, Georgia)
- College: Jacksonville (2017–2019); Arkansas (2020–2022)
- NBA draft: 2022: undrafted
- Playing career: 2022–present

Career history
- 2022–2023: Aris Thessaloniki
- 2023–2025: Trapani Shark
- 2026–present: Manresa

Janaud "JD" Notae (born October 27, 1998) is an American professional basketball player for Bàsquet Manresa of the Liga ACB and the EuroCup. He previously played college basketball for the Arkansas Razorbacks and the Jacksonville Dolphins.

== Early life ==
Notae was raised by a single mother, Stacy, and often lived with his grandmother or his mother's friends. He was separated from his mother for four years after she was imprisoned. Notae grew up playing football before starting to play basketball in eighth grade. He attended Newton High School in Covington, Georgia, where he played basketball alongside Ashton Hagans and Isaiah Miller. Notae was named GACA 7A North Player of the Year. He was lightly recruited and committed to playing college basketball for Jacksonville over offers from Kennesaw State and North Carolina A&T.

== College career ==
Notae immediately assumed a leading role for Jacksonville. On December 28, 2017, he scored a freshman season-high 30 points in an 81–60 win over Middle Georgia State. On February 15, 2018, Notae suffered a season-ending foot injury during a game against NJIT. As a freshman, Notae averaged 15.4 points and 4.7 rebounds per game and was named Atlantic Sun Freshman of the Year. On November 21, 2018, Notae recorded a career-high 40 points, eight rebounds and five assists in a 123–77 victory over Florida Memorial. As a sophomore, he averaged 15.5 points, 6.2 rebounds and 3.4 assists per game, earning Second Team All-Atlantic Sun honors.

For his junior season, Notae transferred to Arkansas, choosing the Razorbacks over Seton Hall, Iowa State, Oklahoma State and Creighton, among others. He sat out for one season due to NCAA transfer rules. He suffered a broken wrist during offseason workouts in 2020. Notae was named Southeastern Conference (SEC) Sixth Man of the Year as a junior. He averaged 12.8 points, 3.1 rebounds, 1.9 assists and 1.4 steals per game, shooting 38.2 percent from the field. As a senior, Notae was named to the First Team All-SEC.

== Professional career ==
=== Aris Thessaloniki (2022–2023) ===
On August 18, 2022, Notae signed his first professional contract overseas with Greek club Aris Thessaloniki. In 23 domestic league games, he averaged 15.3 points, 3 rebounds, 2.7 assists and 1.8 steals in 28 minutes per contest.

=== Trapani Shark (2023–2025) ===
On August 2, 2023, Notae signed with Italian club Trapani Shark. In 32 domestic league games, he averaged 17.5 points, 4.6 rebounds, 3.1 assists and 1.5 steals in 27 minutes per contest.

=== Manresa (2026–present) ===
On August 20, 2026, Notae signed with Bàsquet Manresa of the Liga ACB and the EuroCup.

== Career statistics ==
Legend
GP	Games played	GS	Games started	MPG	Minutes per game
FG%	Field goal percentage	3P%	3-point field goal percentage	FT%	Free throw percentage
RPG	Rebounds per game	APG	Assists per game	SPG	Steals per game
BPG	Blocks per game	PPG	Points per game	**Bold**	Career high

=== College ===
Year	Team	GP	GS	MPG	FG%	3P%	FT%	RPG	APG	SPG	BPG	PPG
2017–18	Jacksonville	28	28	31.4	.410	**.405**	.699	4.7	1.9	1.8	.5	15.4
2018–19	Jacksonville	32	23	29.2	**.427**	.320	.730	**6.2**	3.4	1.6	.4	15.5
2019–20	Arkansas	Redshirt										
2020–21	Arkansas	32	1	22.6	.382	.335	.760	3.1	1.9	1.4	.3	12.8
2021–22	Arkansas	**36**	**35**	**33.1**	.396	.297	**.774**	4.6	**3.7**	**2.3**	**.7**	**18.3**
Career		128	87	29.1	.403	.330	.746	4.6	2.8	1.8	.5	15.6
