= Nathan Knight =

American basketball player (born 1997)

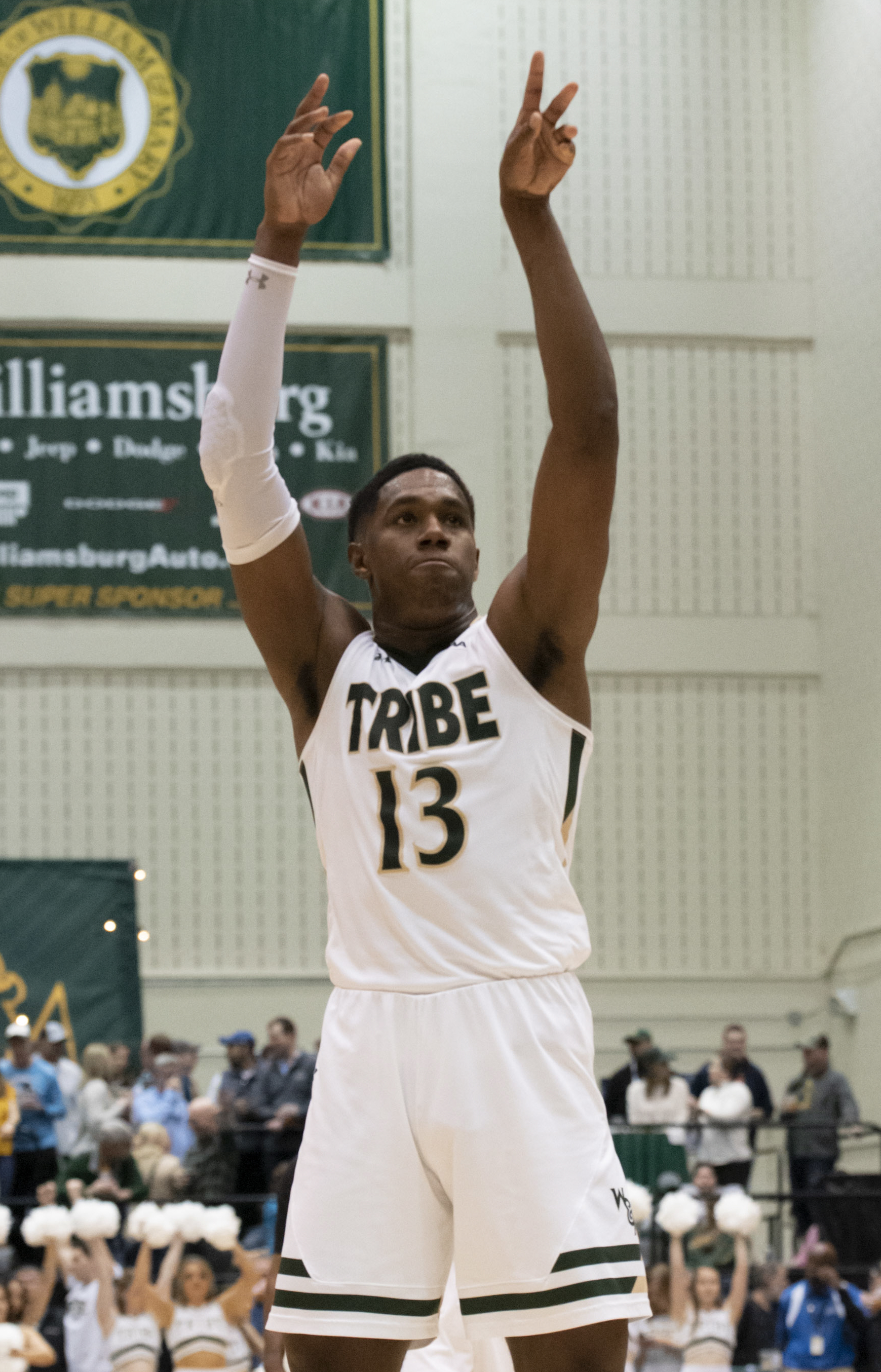
- Knight with William & Mary in 2020

No. 13 – Bnei Herzliya
- Position: Power forward / center
- League: Israeli Basketball Premier League

Personal information
- Born: September 20, 1997 (age 29) Syracuse, New York, U.S.
- Listed height: 6 ft 9 in (2.06 m)
- Listed weight: 235 lb (107 kg)

Career information
- High school: Nottingham (Syracuse, New York); Kimball Union Academy (Meriden, New Hampshire)
- College: William & Mary (2016–2020)
- NBA draft: 2020: undrafted
- Playing career: 2020–present

Career history
- 2020–2021: Atlanta Hawks
- 2021–2023: Minnesota Timberwolves
- 2021–2022: →Iowa Wolves
- 2023: Maine Celtics
- 2023–2024: Motor City Cruise
- 2024–2025: Zhejiang Lions
- 2025–2026: Goyang Sono Skygunners
- 2026–present: Bnei Herzliya

Career highlights
- KBL All-Star Game MVP (2026); CBA champion (2025); Lou Henson Award (2020); CAA Player of the Year (2020); CAA Defensive Player of the Year (2020); 2× First-team All-CAA (2019, 2020); Second-team All-CAA (2018); 3× CAA All-Defensive Team (2018–2020); CAA All-Rookie Team (2017)
- Stats at NBA.com
- Stats at Basketball Reference

Nathan Solomon Kapahukula Knight (born September 20, 1997) is an American professional basketball player for Bnei Herzliya of the Israeli Basketball Premier League.

He played college basketball for the William & Mary Tribe, and in 2020 was the NCAA Division I mid-major national player of the year when he won the Lou Henson Award, as well as the Colonial Athletic Association Defensive Player of the Year. He played in the NBA for the Atlanta Hawks and the Minnesota Timberwolves. Knight was named the 2025–26 Korean Basketball League (KBL) All-Star Game MVP.

== Early life ==
Knight grew up in Syracuse, New York and attended Nottingham High School. As a freshman, he was a pitcher on the baseball team before deciding to focus on basketball after experiencing a growth spurt. As a senior, he averaged 14.1 points and 7.4 rebounds per game and was named All-Central New York. Knight completed a postgraduate year at Kimball Union Academy in Meriden, New Hampshire. In AAU play, he competed for Gym Ratz, coached by Billy Edelin. On October 5, 2015, he committed to William & Mary over offers from Temple, Duquesne, George Mason, and Canisius among others. Knight appreciated the rich history of the college and felt at home on the campus, saying it was an easy decision to make.

== College career ==
As a true freshman, Knight averaged 8.2 points and 4.4 rebounds per game in 31 games played (six starts). Coach Tony Shaver praised his work ethic for losing 45 pounds before his sophomore season.

As a sophomore, he averaged 18.5 points (5th in the conference), 7.3 rebounds (7th), and two blocks (2nd) per game, shot 57.5% from the floor, and was named second team All-Colonial Athletic Association (CAA). On February 9, 2019, Knight had a career-high 39 points to go with 14 rebounds at Hofstra. He followed that up with 35 points and 13 rebounds against Elon on February 16 and 30 points in a win over College of Charleston on February 21.

Knight was named first team All-CAA as a junior after averaging 21.0 points ( leading the conference, and the 4th-highest percentage in team history), 8.6 rebounds (2nd), 3.5 assists (2nd), and 2.3 blocks (leading the conference) per game, while shooting 57.8% from the field (the third-highest percentage in team history). Knight became the first college basketball player since Tim Duncan at Wake Forest University in 1997 to average 20 points, eight rebounds, three assists and two blocked shots per game, and his scoring average was the highest for a Tribe player since 1968. He also had 12 double-doubles. After entering the 2019 NBA draft, Knight withdrew from the draft before the deadline and decided to return to William & Mary for his senior season.

Coming into his senior season, coach Shaver was fired and replaced by Dane Fischer while four players transferred, though Knight decided to stay on the team. During his senior season, Knight put up 30-point games against Buffalo and Oklahoma. On January 4, 2020, Knight hit a last-second shot in a 66–64 win against Northeastern and finished with 23 points and 11 rebounds. On February 8, 2020, Knight passed the 2,000 career point mark by scoring 16 points while also grabbing 13 rebounds. He became the fourth player in program history to reach the milestone. At the conclusion of the regular season, Knight was named CAA Player of the Year and CAA Defensive Player of the Year. He became just the second men's basketball player in CAA history to earn both awards in the same season, joining George Mason's George Evans (1999, 2001).

Knight finished the season averaging league-leading 20.7 points ,10.5 rebounds, and 1.5 blocks per game, the fourth CAA player to average 20 points and 10 rebounds in a season, while dishing out 1.8 assists (3rd in the conference) per game and shooting 52.4% from the field.

== Professional career ==
=== Atlanta Hawks (2020–2021) ===
Knight was signed to a two-way contract by the Atlanta Hawks on November 19, 2020. He played 33 games for the Hawks in the 2020–21 season, averaging 3.8 points and 2.2 rebounds per game. He did not appear for the Hawks' NBA G League affiliate, the College Park Skyhawks, as the team sat out the season due to the COVID pandemic.

=== Minnesota Timberwolves (2021–2023) ===
For the 2021–22 season, Knight signed another two-way deal, this time with the Minnesota Timberwolves and their G League affiliate, the Iowa Wolves. In his first career NBA start on December 27, 2021, Knight recorded 20 points, 11 rebounds, one steal, and one block in a win against the Boston Celtics. He averaged 3.7 points and 2.3 rebounds in 37 appearances.

On July 23, 2022, Knight re-signed with the Timberwolves, where he went on to average 3.7 points and 1.5 rebounds in 38 appearances.

=== Maine Celtics (2023) ===
On July 21, 2023, Knight signed a two-way contract with the New York Knicks, but was waived on October 19. Three days later, he signed a two-way contract with the Boston Celtics. On December 12, Boston waived Knight. He averaged 8.9 points, 8.3 rebounds, and 1.0 blocks in 22.9 minutes in 12 games with the Maine Celtics.

=== Motor City Cruise (2023–2024) ===
On December 17, 2023, Knight was acquired by the Motor City Cruise after he had returned to Maine.

=== Zhejiang Lions (2024–2025) ===
On August 3, 2024, Knight signed with the Zhejiang Lions of the Chinese Basketball Association. He averaged 10.2 points and 7.1 rebounds per game. Knight became a CBA champion in his year with the team as the Lions went on to win the 2024–25 CBA championship by defeating the Beijing Ducks 4–2 in a best-of-seven game finals.

=== Sono Skygunners (2025–2026) ===
The following season, Knight signed with the Korean Basketball League's Goyang Sono Skygunners. He was crowned the 2026 KBL All-Star Game MVP after recording 47 points, 17 rebounds, and 9 assists. He averaged 17.4 points (8th in the league), 10.8 rebounds (4th), 2.5 assists, and 0.9 blocks (5th) over 65 games.

=== Bnei Herzliya (2026–present) ===
In 2026-27 he plays for Bnei Herzliya of the Israeli Basketball Premier League.

== Career statistics ==
Legend
GP	Games played	GS	Games started	MPG	Minutes per game
FG%	Field goal percentage	3P%	3-point field goal percentage	FT%	Free throw percentage
RPG	Rebounds per game	APG	Assists per game	SPG	Steals per game
BPG	Blocks per game	PPG	Points per game	**Bold**	Career high

=== NBA ===
==== Regular season ====
Year	Team	GP	GS	MPG	FG%	3P%	FT%	RPG	APG	SPG	BPG	PPG
2020–21	Atlanta	33	0	**8.5**	.370	.182	**.800**	2.2	.2	**.3**	**.3**	**3.8**
2021–22	Minnesota	37	**2**	7.2	.511	.308	.733	**2.3**	**.6**	.2	.2	3.7
2022–23	Minnesota	**38**	0	7.7	**.568**	**.364**	.684	1.5	.3	**.3**	.2	3.7
Career		108	2	7.8	.476	.265	.738	2.0	.4	.2	.2	3.7

==== Playoffs ====
Year	Team	GP	GS	MPG	FG%	3P%	FT%	RPG	APG	SPG	BPG	PPG
2021	Atlanta	**6**	0	2.3	**.286**	.000	.000	**1.0**	.0	.0	**.3**	.7
2023	Minnesota	2	0	**2.4**	.250	.000	–	.5	.0	.0	.0	**1.0**
Career		8	0	2.3	.273	.000	.000	.9	.0	.0	.3	.8

=== College ===
Year	Team	GP	GS	MPG	FG%	3P%	FT%	RPG	APG	SPG	BPG	PPG
2016–17	William & Mary	31	6	17.2	**.578**	.167	.594	4.4	1.1	.4	1.3	8.2
2017–18	William & Mary	31	30	28.7	.575	**.306**	.769	7.3	2.2	.6	2.0	18.5
2018–19	William & Mary	31	30	**30.6**	**.578**	.244	.732	8.6	**3.5**	.4	**2.3**	**21.0**
2019–20	William & Mary	**32**	**32**	29.6	.524	.305	**.773**	**10.5**	1.8	**.8**	1.5	20.7
Career		125	98	26.6	.560	.283	.736	7.7	2.1	.5	1.8	17.1

== Personal life ==
Knight is the youngest of four children. In December 2008, Knight's 18-year-old sister Yeisha Howard was stabbed to death in Syracuse. According to the prosecutor, it was part of a longstanding feud, and the perpetrator of the attack was sentenced to seven years in prison.
