= Ken Lofton =

Ken Lofton may refer to:

- Kenny Lofton (born 1967), American former professional baseball player and college basketball player
- Kenneth Lofton Jr. (born 2002), American basketball player
