= Audavion Collins =

American football player

No. 2 – Penn State Nittany Lions
- Position: Cornerback
- Class: Senior

Personal information
- Listed height: 5 ft 11 in (1.80 m)
- Listed weight: 183 lb (83 kg)

Career information
- High school: Newton (Covington, Georgia)
- College: Mississippi State (2022); Penn State (2023–present)
- Stats at ESPN

Audavion Collins is an American college football cornerback for the Penn State Nittany Lions. He previously played for the Mississippi State Bulldogs.

== Early life ==
Collins attended Newton High School in Covington, Georgia. As a senior he had 62 tackles with one interception and also had five receptions for 150 yards and two touchdowns. He committed to Mississippi State University to play college football.

== College career ==
Collins did not play in a game his lone season at Mississippi State in 2022. He entered the transfer portal after the season and committed to Penn State. He played in six games his first year at Penn State in 2023 and had three tackles and 16 games in 2024, recording 26 tackles and an interception. Collins became a starter in 2025, starting all 13 games and finishing the season with 47 tackles. He returned to Penn State for the 2026 season.
