= Eastside High School (Covington, Georgia) =

Public secondary school in Covington, Georgia, United States

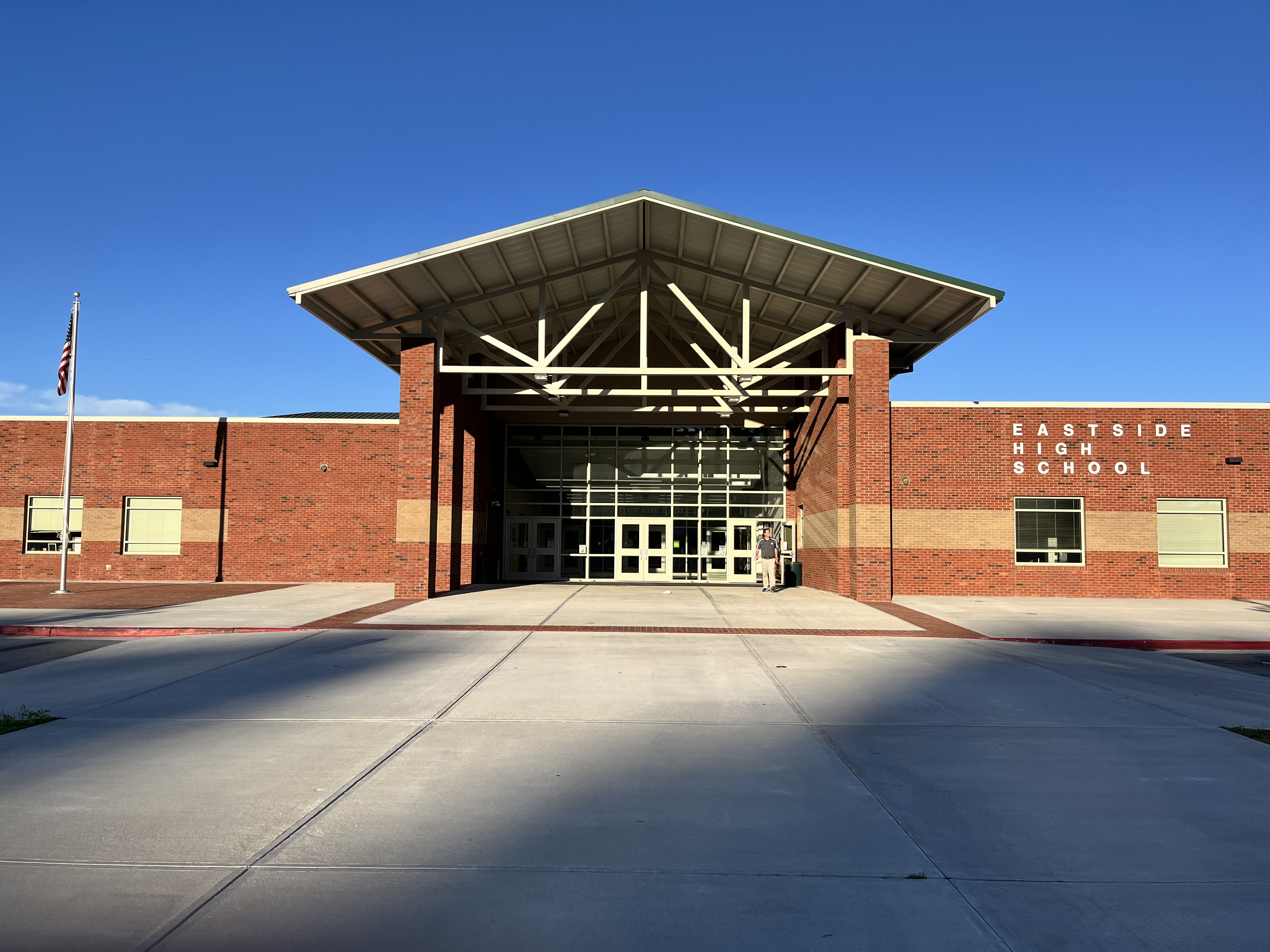

Location
- 140 Highway 142; Covington, Georgia; United States; 33°35′13″N 83°47′41″W

Information
- Type: Public
- Motto: Excellence For All Students Through Strong Relationships & Instructional Strategies Delivered By Effective Educators
- Established: 1994
- School district: Newton County School System
- Principal: Jeff Cher
- Grades: 9 to 12
- Enrollment: 1,590 (2024-2025)
- Colors: Green and silver
- Mascot: Eagles
- Website: ehs.newtoncountyschools.org

Eastside High School is a public secondary school in Covington, Georgia, United States. It is part of the Newton County School System. It was opened in 1994 as a transitional school and became an official high school in 1998 when it had its first graduating class.

== History ==
Eastside Transitional School was built in 1994 to alleviate school overcrowding at Newton High School due to the rapid growth of Newton County in the early 1990s. The school opened that same year to grades 6–9.

Each year, the lower grade was dropped and a higher grade was added, until 1997 when the school became a 9–12 high school, Eastside High.

The first graduating class graduated in May 1998.

In 2002, a new addition was built onto the school to help accommodate more growth.

In 2006, the school had an enrollment of 1,441 and a staff of 100 teachers. This number decreased slightly with the opening of Newton County's third high school, Alcovy High School, in the fall of 2006.

It was announced in March 2019 that Eastside would move to a new location that would open at the beginning of the 2021-2022 school year. Eastside's old facility would become home to the Newton County Theme School at Fiquett, a K-8 school also located in Covington, Georgia. Due to construction delays, Eastside instead moved into its new location at the beginning of the 2022-2023 school year, and the Newton County Theme School, renamed the Newton County STEAM Academy, moved into the former Eastside building at the beginning of the 2023-2024 school year.

== Curriculum ==
Eastside High School is accredited by the Southern Association of Colleges and Schools to award College Preparatory and Technology Preparatory diplomas to graduates.

The school offers different levels of classes including:

- Advanced Placement
- Gifted (Quest)
- Advanced
- Average

== Sports ==
Eastside High School competes in Region 8-AAAAA in the following sports:

- Baseball
- Softball
- Football
- Soccer
- Tennis
- Volleyball
- Cheerleading
- Track and field
- Wrestling
- Cross country running
- Swimming
- Golf
- Basketball

== Notable alumni ==
- Jalen Farmer, professional football player for the Indianapolis Colts
- Sheldon Rankins, professional football player for the Houston Texans
- Eric Stokes, professional football player for the Las Vegas Raiders

== Eastside media ==
- Eagle Nest Morning Show (CCTV)
- Wingspan (newspaper) (Retired)
- Talon (yearbook)
