= Newton High School (Georgia) =

Public high school in Covington, Georgia, United States

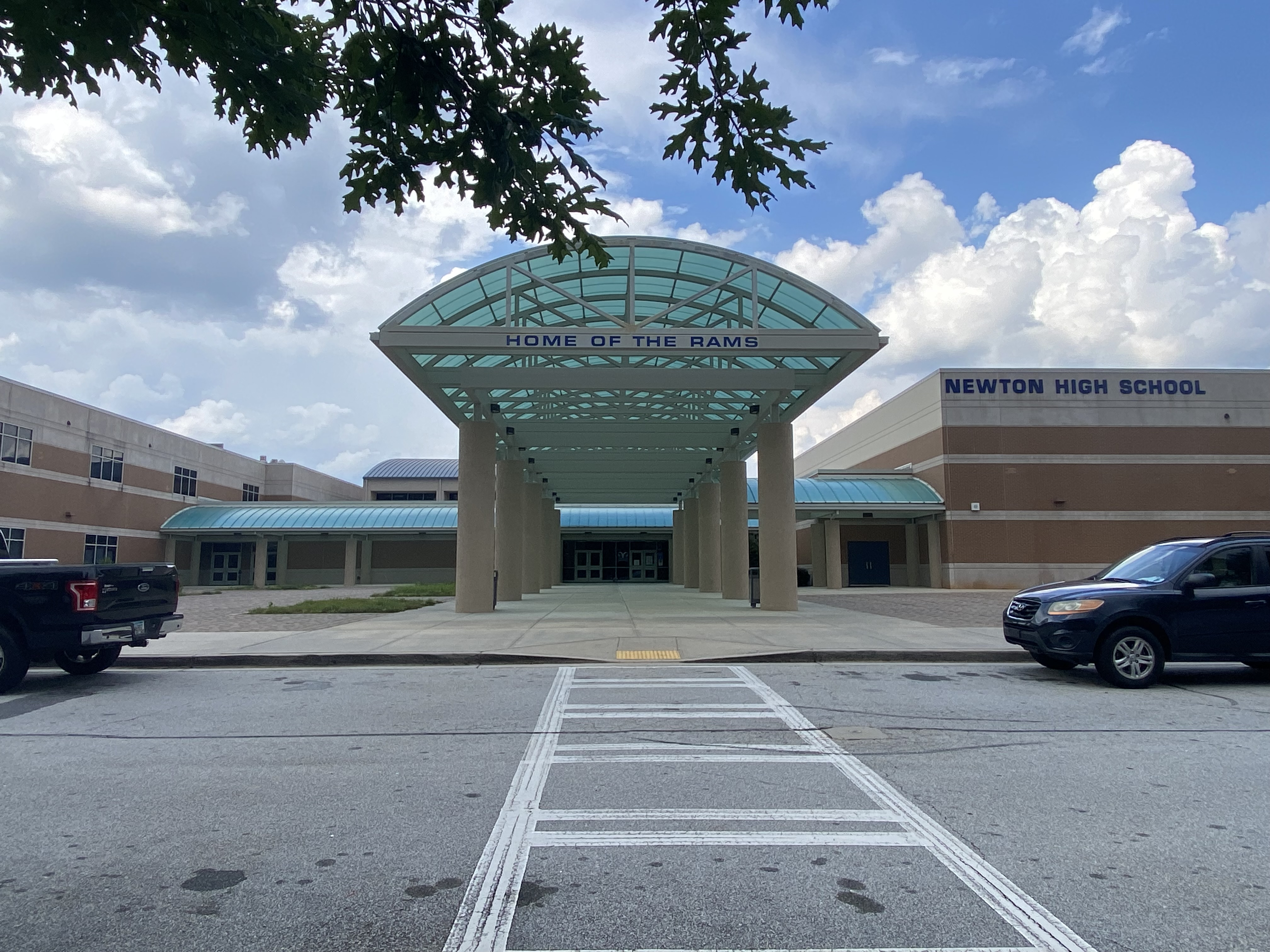

Location
- 1 Ram Way; Covington, Georgia 30014-1965; United States; 33.585268°N 83.902373°W

Information
- Type: Comprehensive public high school secondary school
- Established: 1949
- School district: Newton County Schools
- Principal: Dr. Stephen Hammock
- Teaching staff: 120.40 FTE
- Grades: 9–12
- Gender: Co-educational
- Enrollment: 2,563 (2023-2024)
- Student to teacher ratio: 21.29
- Campus type: Suburban
- Colors: Blue and white
- Athletics conference: Georgia High School Association (GHSA)
- Mascot: Ram
- Nickname: Rams
- Accreditation: Southern Association of Colleges and Schools
- Website: nhs.newtoncountyschools.org

Newton High School is a four-year comprehensive public high school serving students in ninth through twelfth grades in Covington, Georgia, United States. It is part of the Newton County School System. Located thirty-two miles outside Atlanta, it is one of three schools serving Newton County. The school serves 2,000 students in grades 9–12.

== History ==
Newton High School was established in 1949. The original building was located on Newton Drive, where Sharp Learning Center is now located. At this time, it was the only high school in Newton County. Due to growth in the number of students, Newton County passed a bond referendum and started construction at the present site. The Board of Education began construction in the school year 1972-73 and the school opened to students in August of the 1974–75 school year.

The first graduating class from this site was June 1975. For 25 years this school served as this county's only high school. Another bond referendum was passed and Eastside High School opened in August 1994. Enrollment at this time was 2,300 students. Eventually, Newton County passed another bond referendum for a new high school, Alcovy High School, which opened in 2006. It operated on a 4x4 block schedule since 2009, but changed back to the original seven-period schedule for the 2011–2012 school year.

Scenes from American Reunion were filmed at the school in the summer of 2011.

Newton High School was scheduled to be turned into housing for STEM students from the career academy in 2013, and rebuilt on a new site, due to projected remodeling costs being more expensive than new construction costs. This is part of a five-year plan put in place in 2009, which also includes the building of a new Eastside High School while the old, smaller Eastside building will be turned into a theme school.

Newton High School experienced a school fire due to arson on May 23, 2012. There were no fatalities and all the students managed to escape. The damages were little to moderate.

== Notable alumni ==
- 6lack, rapper
- Luke Allen, former professional baseball player for the Los Angeles Dodgers and Colorado Rockies
- Dale Carter, former professional football player for the Kansas City Chiefs
- Stephon Castle, basketball player for the San Antonio Spurs
- Jimmy Clark III, basketball player for Maccabi Tel Aviv B.C.
- Audavion Collins, college football cornerback for the Penn State Nittany Lions
- Elija Godwin, medalist at the 2020 Summer Olympics
- Tay Gowan, professional football player for the Tennessee Titans
- Ashton Hagans, professional basketball player
- Deunte Heath, professional baseball player
- Akeem Hunt, former professional American football player
- Tim Hyers, professional baseball player (San Diego Padres, Detroit Tigers, and Florida Marlins) and current batting coach for the Atlanta Braves
- Demetrius McCray, former professional American football player
- Isaiah Miller, professional basketball player
- JD Notae, professional basketball player
- Jake Reed, former professional American football player
