= Sheldon Rankins =

American football player (born 1994)

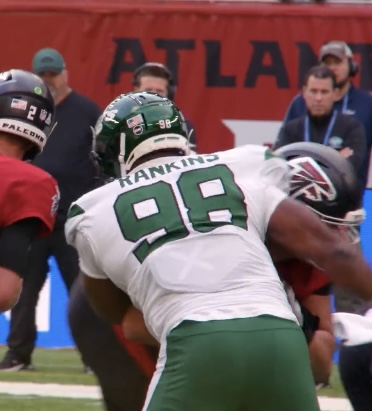
- Rankins with the New York Jets in 2021

No. 98 – Houston Texans
- Position: Defensive tackle
- Roster status: Active

Personal information
- Born: April 2, 1994 (age 32); Covington, Georgia, U.S.
- Listed height: 6 ft 2 in (1.88 m)
- Listed weight: 305 lb (138 kg)

Career information
- High school: Eastside (Covington)
- College: Louisville (2012–2015)
- NFL draft: 2016: 1st round, 12th overall pick

Career history
- New Orleans Saints (2016–2020); New York Jets (2021–2022); Houston Texans (2023); Cincinnati Bengals (2024); Houston Texans (2025–present)

Career NFL statistics as of 2025
- Total tackles: 281
- Sacks: 33.5
- Forced fumbles: 5
- Fumble recoveries: 4
- Interceptions: 1
- Pass deflections: 3
- Defensive touchdowns: 2
- Stats at Pro Football Reference

Sheldon Taylor Rankins (born April 2, 1994) is an American professional football defensive tackle for the Houston Texans of the National Football League (NFL). He played college football for the Louisville Cardinals and was selected by the New Orleans Saints in the first round of the 2016 NFL draft.

== Early life ==
Rankins attended Eastside High School in Covington, Georgia. He committed to the University of Louisville to play college football.

== College career ==
At Louisville, Rankins was mostly a backup during his freshman and sophomore years, recording 22 tackles and four sacks. As a junior, in 2014, Rankins started in all 13 games and had 53 tackles, eight sacks, and two interceptions. As a senior, in 2015, he had 58 tackles, six sacks, and a fumble return touchdown.

== Professional career ==
Pre-draft measurables
Height	Weight	Arm length	Hand span	Wingspan	40-yard dash	10-yard split	20-yard split	20-yard shuttle	Three-cone drill	Vertical jump	Broad jump	Bench press
6 ft 1 1/8 in (1.86 m)	299 lb (136 kg)	33 3/8 in (0.85 m)	9 3/8 in (0.24 m)	6 ft 7 3/4 in (2.03 m)	5.03 s	1.74 s	2.89 s	4.59 s	7.44 s	34.5 in (0.88 m)	9 ft 10 in (3.00 m)	28 reps
All values from NFL Combine

=== New Orleans Saints ===
On April 28, 2016, Rankins was selected as the 12th overall pick by the New Orleans Saints in the first round of the 2016 NFL draft. On May 9, the Saints signed him to a four-year, 12.8 million dollar contract. On August 16, 2016, Rankins suffered a broken fibula during practice. The injury required surgery, with up to 6 weeks to recover. On September 6, he was placed on the injured reserve/designated for return list. He was activated on November 5, prior to Week 9. During his rookie year, he played in 9 games and finished with 20 tackles, four sacks, and a forced fumble.

During his second season in 2017, Rankins started all 16 regular season games to help a scoring defense go from ranking 31st to tenth in the league. He recorded 16 solo tackles (26 total), one forced fumble, one interception, and one pass defensed.

In a Week 8 win against the Minnesota Vikings in 2018, for the first time in his NFL career, Rankins made 2 sacks in a single game on quarterback Kirk Cousins. For that game, he shared the top spot for sacks on the team with teammate LB Marcus Davenport. Throughout the 2018 season, Rankins started all 16 games, recording 40 tackles and eight sacks (second-best on the team behind Cameron Jordan.) In the divisional round of the playoffs against the Philadelphia Eagles, Rankins suffered a torn Achilles and was placed on injured reserve on January 15, 2019.

On April 24, 2019, the Saints picked up the fifth-year option on Rankins' contract. He was placed on injured reserve on December 11 with an ankle injury. He finished the season with 10 tackles and two sacks through 10 games.

On November 6, 2020, Rankins was placed on injured reserve with a knee injury. He was activated on December 5. In the Wild Card round against the Chicago Bears, he sacked quarterback Mitchell Trubisky. Throughout the season, he played in 12 regular season games and 2 post-season games, recording 2.5 sacks, 23 combined tackles, 11 quarterback hits and 1 pass deflection.

=== New York Jets ===
On March 23, 2021, Rankins signed a two-year, $17 million contract with the New York Jets. That season, he played in 16 regular season games while starting in 3, making 3 sacks, 32 combined tackles, 7 quarterback hits and 2 fumble recoveries.

On November 8, 2022, on a first down in the first quarter, Rankins forced a fumble on Buffalo Bills quarterback Josh Allen, of which Allen recovered for a 2-yard gain. In that win for the Jets, he was ruled out for 4–6 weeks after suffering a dislocated elbow. Rankins returned to play on December 4, in a loss to the Vikings. He ended the season starting in 15 games, with 3 sacks, 43 combined tackles, 7 quarterback hits and 1 forced fumble.

=== Houston Texans (first stint) ===
On March 18, 2023, Rankins signed a one-year, $10.5 million contract with the Houston Texans. He was activated from the physically unable to perform list on July 30. Rankins was named the starting right defensive tackle that season. During the Week 17 victory over the Tennessee Titans, Rankins recovered a fumble by Will Levis and returned it 13 yards for his first NFL touchdown. In 15 starts, he recorded 37 tackles, a forced fumble, and was third on the team with six sacks.

=== Cincinnati Bengals ===
On March 18, 2024, Rankins signed a two-year deal with the Cincinnati Bengals. He started all seven games he played, recording 18 tackles and one sack. He missed three games due to a hamstring injury and the final seven games due to an illness.

On February 21, 2025, Rankins was released by the Bengals.

=== Houston Texans (second stint) ===
On March 14, 2025, Rankins signed a one-year, $5.25 million contract with the Houston Texans. He started all 17 games in 2025, recording 35 tackles, three sacks, and a fumble recovery returned for a touchdown.

On March 9, 2026, Rankins signed a two-year, $17 million contract extension with the Texans.

== NFL career statistics ==
Legend
	Led the league
**Bold**	Career high

=== Regular season ===
Year	Team	Games		Tackles					Interceptions						Fumbles				
Year	Team	GP	GS	Cmb	Solo	Ast	Sck	TFL	Int	Yds	Avg	Lng	TD	PD	FF	Fum	FR	Yds	TD
2016	NO	9	0	20	15	5	4.0	3	0	0	0.0	0	0	0	**1**	0	0	0	0
2017	NO	16	16	26	16	10	2.0	5	**1**	**27**	**27.0**	**27**	0	**1**	**1**	0	0	0	0
2018	NO	16	16	40	26	14	**8.0**	**12**	0	0	0.0	0	0	**1**	**1**	0	0	0	0
2019	NO	10	0	10	7	3	2.0	2	0	0	0.0	0	0	0	0	0	0	0	0
2020	NO	12	1	20	13	7	1.5	3	0	0	0.0	0	0	**1**	0	0	0	0	0
2021	NYJ	16	3	32	15	17	3.0	5	0	0	0.0	0	0	0	0	0	**2**	0	0
2022	NYJ	15	15	**43**	25	18	3.0	4	0	0	0.0	0	0	0	**1**	0	0	0	0
2023	HOU	15	15	37	**29**	8	6.0	9	0	0	0.0	0	0	0	**1**	0	1	13	**1**
2024	CIN	7	7	18	10	8	1.0	1	0	0	0.0	0	0	0	0	0	0	0	0
2025	HOU	17	17	35	15	**20**	3.0	5	0	0	0.0	0	0	0	0	0	1	**32**	**1**
Career		133	90	281	171	110	33.5	49	1	27	27.0	27	0	3	5	0	4	45	2

=== Postseason ===
Year	Team	Games		Tackles					Interceptions						Fumbles				
Year	Team	GP	GS	Cmb	Solo	Ast	Sck	TFL	Int	Yds	Avg	Lng	TD	PD	FF	Fum	FR	Yds	TD
2017	NO	2	2	**10**	**7**	**3**	1.0	**1**	0	0	0.0	0	0	0	0	0	0	0	0
2018	NO	1	1	0	0	0	0.0	0	0	0	0.0	0	0	0	0	0	0	0	0
2020	NO	2	0	3	3	0	1.0	**1**	0	0	0.0	0	0	0	0	0	0	0	0
2023	HOU	2	2	3	3	0	0.0	0	0	0	0.0	0	0	0	0	0	0	0	0
2025	HOU	2	2	6	3	**3**	**1.5**	**1**	0	0	0.0	0	0	0	0	0	**1**	**33**	**1**
Career		9	7	22	16	6	3.5	3	0	0	0.0	0	0	0	0	0	1	33	1
