= Demetrius McCray =

American football player (born 1991)

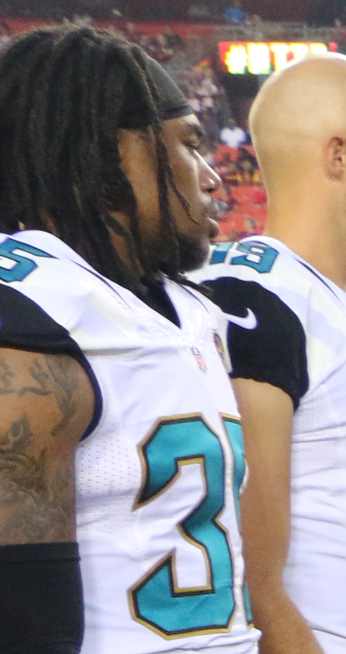
- McCray with the Jacksonville Jaguars in 2015

No. 35, 25
- Position: Cornerback

Personal information
- Born: May 11, 1991 (age 35); Long Beach, California, U.S.
- Listed height: 6 ft 2 in (1.88 m)
- Listed weight: 194 lb (88 kg)

Career information
- High school: Newton (Covington, Georgia)
- College: Appalachian State (2009–2012)
- NFL draft: 2013: 7th round, 210th overall pick

Career history
- Jacksonville Jaguars (2013–2015); Seattle Seahawks (2017)*; Oakland Raiders (2017)
- * Offseason or practice squad member only

Career NFL statistics
- Total tackles: 87
- Fumble recoveries: 1
- Pass deflections: 6
- Stats at Pro Football Reference

Demetrius Charles McCray (born May 11, 1991) is an American former professional football player who was a cornerback in the National Football League (NFL). He was selected by the Jacksonville Jaguars in the seventh round of the 2013 NFL draft. McCray was also a member of the Seattle Seahawks and Oakland Raiders. He played college football for the Appalachian State Mountaineers.

== Early life ==
McCray attended Newton High School in Covington, Georgia, where he lettered in football, basketball and track.

== Professional career ==
Pre-draft measurables
Height	Weight	Arm length	Hand span	40-yard dash	10-yard split	20-yard split	20-yard shuttle	Three-cone drill	Vertical jump	Broad jump	Bench press
6 ft 0 7/8 in (1.85 m)	187 lb (85 kg)	33 7/8 in (0.86 m)	9 1/4 in (0.23 m)	4.47 s	1.57 s	2.50 s	4.21 s	6.76 s	40.5 in (1.03 m)	11 ft 0 in (3.35 m)	4 reps
All values from NFL Combine/Pro Day

=== Jacksonville Jaguars ===
McCray was selected by the Jaguars in the seventh round, 210th overall, in the 2013 NFL draft. In three seasons with Jacksonville, McCray played in 46 games with 16 starts recording 86 tackles and six passes defensed.

On August 29, 2016, McCray was released by the Jaguars.

=== Seattle Seahawks ===
On January 19, 2017, McCray signed a reserve/future contract with the Seahawks. He was waived on September 2, 2017.

=== Oakland Raiders ===
On October 10, 2017, McCray signed with the Oakland Raiders. He was waived/injured by the Raiders on November 4, 2017, and placed on injured reserve. He was released with an injury settlement on November 9, 2017.
