= Jalen Farmer =

American football player (born 2004)

No. 62 – Indianapolis Colts
- Position: Offensive guard
- Roster status: Active

Personal information
- Born: July 27, 2004 (age 22); Atlanta, Georgia, U.S.
- Listed height: 6 ft 5 in (1.96 m)
- Listed weight: 312 lb (142 kg)

Career information
- High school: Eastside (Covington, Georgia)
- College: Florida (2022–2023); Kentucky (2024–2025)
- NFL draft: 2026: 4th round, 113th overall pick

Career history
- Indianapolis Colts (2026–present)
- Stats at Pro Football Reference

Jalen Farmer (born July 27, 2004) is an American professional football offensive guard for the Indianapolis Colts of the National Football League (NFL). He played college football for the Florida Gators and Kentucky Wildcats and was selected by the Colts in the fourth round of the 2026 NFL draft.

== Early life ==
Farmer was born in Atlanta and grew up in Covington, Georgia. He attended where he played football as a lineman. He started for three years and as a senior, playing at left guard and defensive tackle, he posted 50 tackles and two sacks. Farmer was named the Region 8-AAAAA Lineman of the Year and all-state. Ranked a three-star recruit, he committed to play college football for the Florida Gators. Farmer was ranked one of the top-35 offensive line recruits nationally by 247Sports.

== College career ==
As a true freshman at Florida in 2022, Farmer appeared in two games, appearing on 31 snaps, and redshirted. He required surgery after an upper body injury and was only able to return to the team for fall training camp in 2023, where he became the second-string right guard. Farmer appeared in only two games during the 2023 season. He entered the NCAA transfer portal after the season and transferred to the Kentucky, winning a starting role for the 2024 season. Farmer played two years for the Wildcats and started every game in both years at right guard. Although he had remaining eligibility after the 2025 season, he opted to declare for the 2026 NFL draft. He was invited to the 2026 Senior Bowl and the NFL Scouting Combine.

== Professional career ==
Pre-draft measurables
Height	Weight	Arm length	Hand span	Wingspan	40-yard dash	10-yard split	20-yard split	Vertical jump	Broad jump	Bench press
6 ft 4 7/8 in (1.95 m)	312 lb (142 kg)	34 1/4 in (0.87 m)	9 1/4 in (0.23 m)	6 ft 10 5/8 in (2.10 m)	4.93 s	1.75 s	2.88 s	27.0 in (0.69 m)	9 ft 0 in (2.74 m)	37 reps
All values from NFL Combine/Pro Day

Farmer was selected by the Indianapolis Colts in the fourth round with the 113th overall pick in the 2026 NFL draft.
