= Tay Gowan =

American football player (born 1998)

Profile
- Position: Cornerback

Personal information
- Born: January 7, 1998 (age 28); Covington, Georgia, U.S.
- Listed height: 6 ft 2 in (1.88 m)
- Listed weight: 185 lb (84 kg)

Career information
- High school: Newton (Covington, Georgia)
- College: Miami (OH) (2016–2017); Butler CC (2018); UCF (2019–2020)
- NFL draft: 2021: 6th round, 223rd overall pick

Career history
- Arizona Cardinals (2021); Philadelphia Eagles (2021); Minnesota Vikings (2022); Tennessee Titans (2023–2024)*; Winnipeg Blue Bombers (2025)*
- * Offseason or practice squad member only

Career NFL statistics as of 2023
- Total tackles: 2
- Stats at Pro Football Reference

Tay Gowan (born January 7, 1998) is an American professional football cornerback. He played college football at UCF and was selected by the Arizona Cardinals in the sixth round of the 2021 NFL draft.

== Early life ==
Gowan grew up in Covington, Georgia and attended Newton High School. As a high school senior, he earned First-team All-State honors as a defensive back after posting four interceptions and 15 pass breakups.

== College career ==
Gowan began his collegiate career at Miami University, where he redshirted as a true freshman and saw little playing time the following season. He left the program after his redshirt freshman season and enrolled at Butler Community College. In his lone season at Butler, he intercepted six passes and was named All-Jayhawk Conference. Gowan committed to transfer to the University of Central Florida.

Gowan began his first season with the Knights as a reserve defensive back, but became a starter due to injuries. He finished the season with 31 tackles, two interceptions, eight passes broken up and one fumble recovery while allowing 20 catches on 50 passes thrown into his coverage. Gowan opted out of the 2020 season due to the COVID-19 pandemic and declared early for the 2021 NFL draft.

== Professional career ==
Pre-draft measurables
Height	Weight	Arm length	Hand span	40-yard dash	10-yard split	20-yard split	20-yard shuttle	Three-cone drill	Vertical jump	Broad jump	Bench press
6 ft 0 7/8 in (1.85 m)	186 lb (84 kg)	31 1/8 in (0.79 m)	8 1/2 in (0.22 m)	4.49 s	1.55 s	2.52 s	4.27 s	6.86 s	35.5 in (0.90 m)	9 ft 10 in (3.00 m)	13 reps
All values from Pro Day

=== Arizona Cardinals ===
Gowan was selected by the Arizona Cardinals in the sixth round, 223rd overall, of the 2021 NFL draft. Gowan signed his four-year rookie contract with Arizona on May 25, 2021.

=== Philadelphia Eagles ===
Gowan was traded along with a fifth round pick in the 2022 NFL draft to the Philadelphia Eagles in exchange for tight end Zach Ertz on October 15, 2021. He was waived on August 30, 2022.

=== Minnesota Vikings ===
Gowan signed with the practice squad of the Minnesota Vikings on September 1, 2022. Gowan was elevated to active roster from the practice squad on November 19, 2022. He signed a reserve/future contract on January 16, 2023. On August 28, 2023, he was waived.

=== Tennessee Titans ===
On October 9, 2023, Gowan was signed to the Tennessee Titans practice squad. Following the end of the 2023 regular season, the Titans signed him to a reserve/future contract on January 8, 2024.

Gowan was waived by the Titans on August 26, 2024.

=== Winnipeg Blue Bombers ===
On March 28. 2025, Gowan signed with the Winnipeg Blue Bombers of the Canadian Football League (CFL). He was released on June 1.
