= Cameron Oliver =

American basketball player (born 1996)

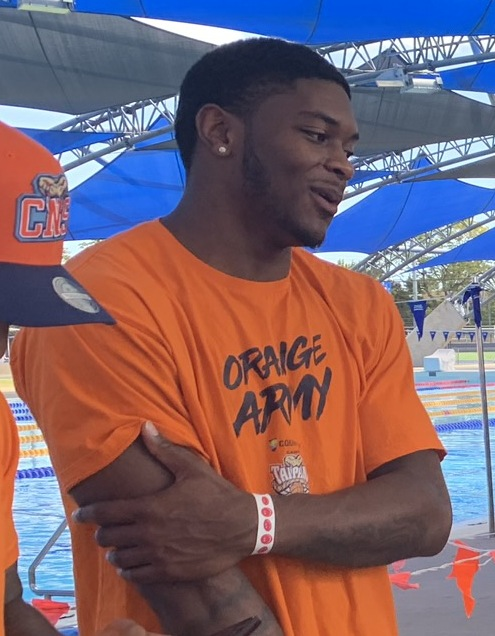
- Oliver with the Cairns Taipans in 2019

No. 0 – Rizing Zephyr Fukuoka
- Position: Power forward / center
- League: B.League

Personal information
- Born: July 11, 1996 (age 30) Oakland, California, U.S.
- Listed height: 6 ft 8 in (2.03 m)
- Listed weight: 240 lb (109 kg)

Career information
- High school: Grant Union (Sacramento, California)
- College: Nevada (2015–2017)
- NBA draft: 2017: undrafted
- Playing career: 2017–present

Career history
- 2017–2018: Wisconsin Herd
- 2018–2019: Delaware 87ers/Blue Coats
- 2019–2021: Cairns Taipans
- 2020: Ironi Nes Ziona
- 2021: Houston Rockets
- 2021–2022: South Bay Lakers
- 2021–2022: Atlanta Hawks
- 2022: Unicaja
- 2022–2023: Leones de Ponce
- 2022: TNT Tropang Giga
- 2022–2023: South Bay Lakers
- 2023–2024: Zhejiang Lions
- 2024: Hong Kong Bulls
- 2024–2025: Sydney Kings
- 2025–2026: Liaoning Flying Leopards
- 2026: Elitzur Netanya
- 2026–present: Rizing Zephyr Fukuoka

Career highlights
- All-NBL Second Team (2020); NBL rebounding leader (2020); CBI champion (2016); Second-team All-MWC (2017); Third-team All-MWC (2016); 2× MWC All-Defensive team (2016, 2017)
- Stats at NBA.com
- Stats at Basketball Reference

Cameron Jaleel Oliver (born July 11, 1996) is an American professional basketball for Rizing Zephyr Fukuoka of the B.League. He played college basketball for the Nevada Wolf Pack. Oliver spent two seasons in the National Basketball Association (NBA) with the Houston Rockets and Atlanta Hawks from 2021 to 2022. He has played internationally in Israel, Australia, Spain, the Philippines, Puerto Rico and China.

== High school career ==
Oliver missed his junior year at Grant Union High School due to an ACL injury, before averaging 21.5 points and ten rebounds as a senior.

== College career ==
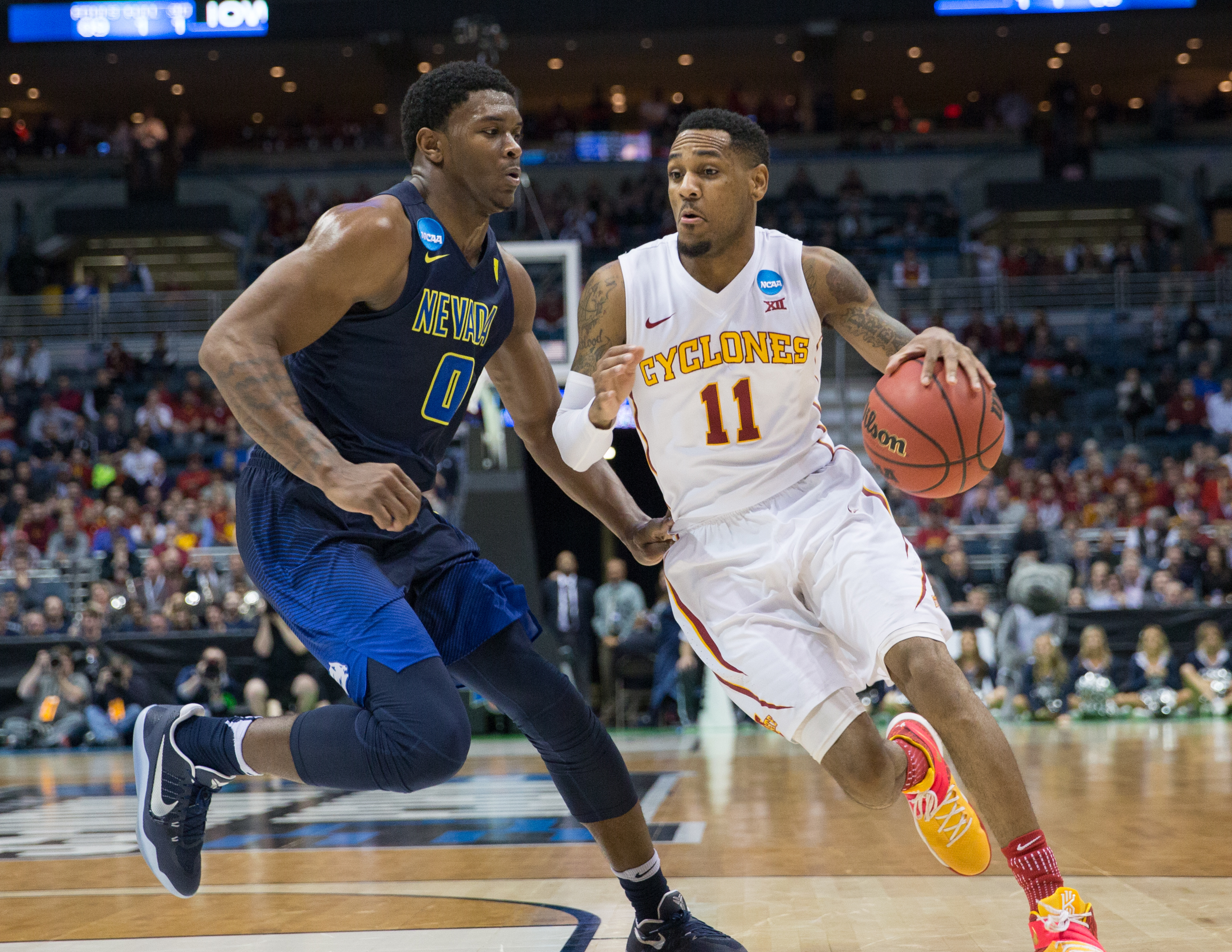
Oliver guards Monté Morris during a game in 2017

Coming out of high school, he committed to Oregon State, but de-committed after a coaching change and eventually sat out the 2014–15 season. He joined the Nevada Wolf Pack for the 2015–16 season, where he enjoyed an outstanding freshman year, averaging 13.4 points, 9.1 rebounds and 2.6 blocked shots a game. Oliver was a key part of a Wolf Pack squad that won the College Basketball Invitational that year. He made the All-Mountain West Third Team as well as the All-Defensive Team and was named Freshman of the Year by the MW media.

In 2016–17, Oliver saw the floor in 35 games to average 16.0 points, 8.7 rebounds, 2.6 blocks and 1.8 assists per outing, guiding Nevada to a 28–7 record and the MW Tournament Championship title. For his efforts, Oliver earned All-MWC First Team and Defensive Player of the Year distinction. His 190 blocks in 73 games ranked him third on Nevada's all-time list, when he left after the conclusion of the 2016–17 season. Oliver received the gift of his first child in December 2016 by his Wife Alecia Ashford who been with Oliver every step of the way .

Oliver declared for the 2017 NBA draft and was invited to the NBA scouting combine in Chicago.

== Professional career ==
=== Wisconsin Herd (2017–2018) ===
After going undrafted in 2017 NBA draft, Oliver spent the NBA Summer League and preseason with the Houston Rockets, but a hand injury in early October led to his release. In November 2017, he joined the Wisconsin Herd of the NBA G League.

=== Delaware 87ers / Blue Coats (2018–2019) ===
On January 26, 2018, Oliver was traded, alongside Shannon Brown, to the Delaware 87ers in exchange for James Blackmon Jr. and the returning player rights to Russ Smith.

In July 2018, Oliver played for the Philadelphia 76ers during the NBA Summer League. After a training camp stint with the Portland Trail Blazers, Oliver re-joined the Delaware Blue Coats for the 2018–19 season. On January 30, 2019, he was ruled out for the rest of the season with a fractured right ankle.

=== Cairns Taipans (2019–2020) ===
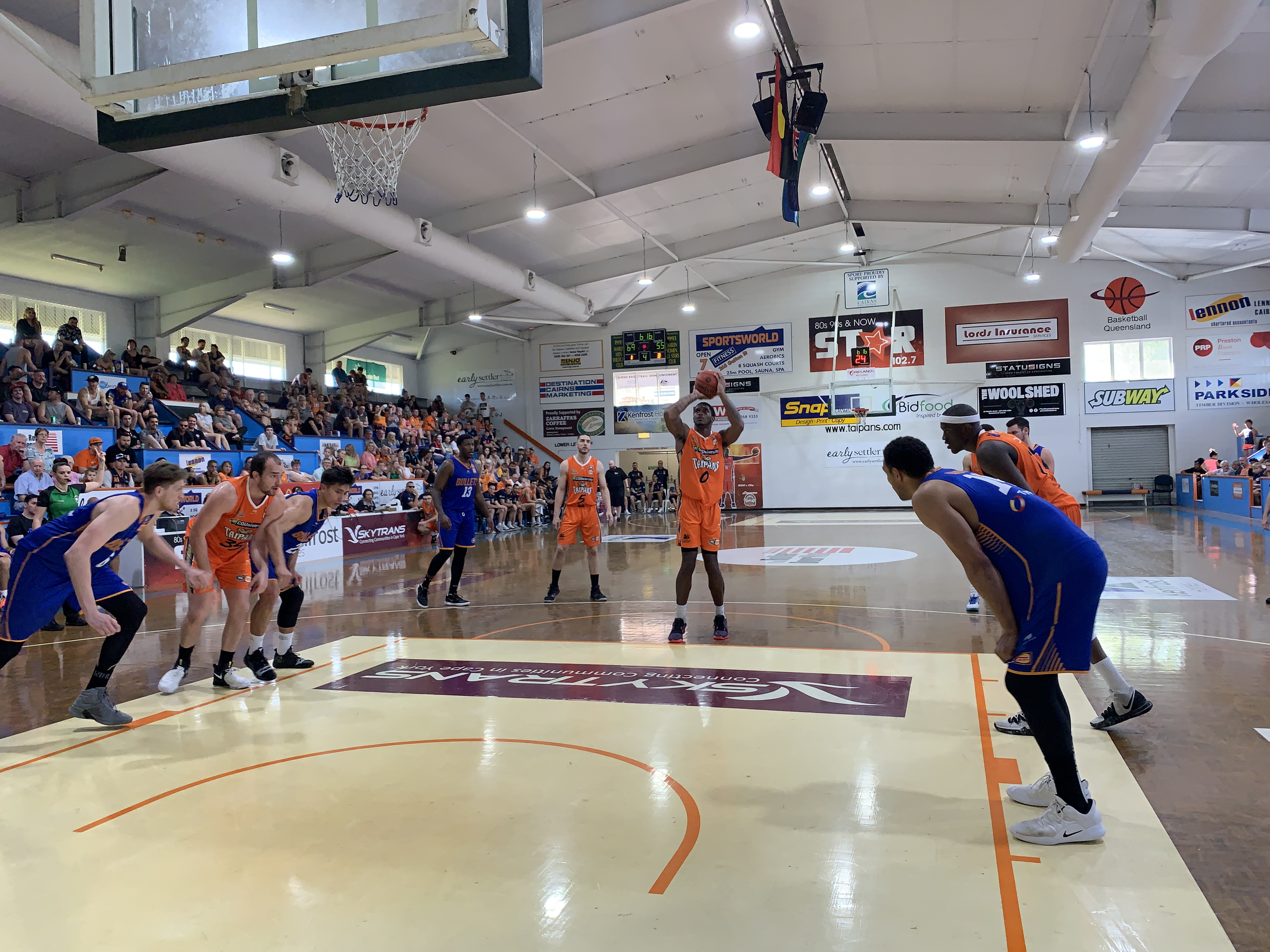
Oliver shoots a free throw with the Cairns Taipans in 2019

On July 26, 2019, Oliver signed with the Cairns Taipans in Australia for the 2019–20 NBL season. He was named to the All-NBL Second Team. Oliver averaged 17 points, 9.1 rebounds and 1.6 blocks per game while shooting 54 percent from the field.

=== Ironi Nes Ziona (2020) ===
On May 14, 2020, Oliver signed with Ironi Nes Ziona of the Israeli Basketball Premier League.

=== Return to Cairns (2020–2021) ===
On November 16, 2020, Oliver re-signed with the Cairns Taipans on a two-year deal. On April 18, 2021, he left the Taipans to return home for personal reasons. He was later released from the final year of his contract with Cairns.

=== Houston Rockets (2021) ===
On May 10, 2021, Oliver signed a 10-day contract with the Houston Rockets. He averaged 10.8 points and 5.3 rebounds in four games to finish the 2020–21 NBA season.

=== South Bay Lakers and Atlanta Hawks (2021–2022) ===
In August 2021, Oliver joined the Golden State Warriors for the 2021 NBA Summer League and on September 29, he signed an Exhibit 10 contract with the Los Angeles Lakers. He was waived on October 15, and on October 23, he was acquired by the South Bay Lakers of the NBA G League as an affiliate player.

On December 29, 2021, Oliver signed a 10-day contract with the Atlanta Hawks. After his 10-day contract with the Hawks expired, Oliver returned to the South Bay Lakers.

=== Unicaja (2022) ===
On February 25, 2022, Oliver signed with Unicaja Malaga of the Liga ACB.

=== Leones de Ponce (2022) ===
In July 2022, Oliver had a 10-game stint with Leones de Ponce in Puerto Rico.

=== TNT Tropang Giga (2022) ===
In August 2022, Oliver signed with the TNT Tropang Giga of the Philippine Basketball Association (PBA) as the team's import for the 2022–23 PBA Commissioner's Cup.

=== Third stint with South Bay (2022–2023) ===
On December 19, 2022, Oliver was reacquired by the South Bay Lakers. On March 5, 2023, Oliver was waived.

=== Return to Leones de Ponce (2023) ===
In March 2023, Oliver re-joined Leones de Ponce in Puerto Rico.

=== Zhejiang Lions (2023–2024) ===
On August 28, 2023, Oliver signed with the Zhejiang Lions of the Chinese Basketball Association. On January 5, 2024, his contract was terminated.

=== Hong Kong Bulls (2024) ===
On May 28, 2024, Oliver joined the Hong Kong Bulls of the Chinese National Basketball League. On August 8, 2024, he was replaced by Josh Carlton due to family reasons.

=== Sydney Kings (2024–2025) ===
On June 10, 2024, Oliver signed with the Sydney Kings of the Australian NBL for the 2024–25 season.

=== Liaoning Flying Leopards (2025-2026) ===
On February 22, 2025, Oliver signed with the Liaoning Flying Leopards.

== Personal life ==
Oliver is married to Alecia who was his high school sweetheart. Their first child, a son, was born in December 2016. They also have two daughters.

== Career statistics ==
Legend
GP	Games played	GS	Games started	MPG	Minutes per game
FG%	Field goal percentage	3P%	3-point field goal percentage	FT%	Free throw percentage
RPG	Rebounds per game	APG	Assists per game	SPG	Steals per game
BPG	Blocks per game	PPG	Points per game	**Bold**	Career high

=== NBA ===
==== Regular season ====
Year	Team	GP	GS	MPG	FG%	3P%	FT%	RPG	APG	SPG	BPG	PPG
2020–21	Houston	**4**	0	**21.8**	.576	.308	.250	**5.3**	1.3	**.5**	**1.0**	10.8
2021–22	Atlanta	2	0	21.5	**.667**	**.333**	**.667**	3.0	**1.5**	**.5**	.5	**11.5**
Career		6	0	21.7	.604	.313	.429	4.5	1.3	.5	.8	11.0
