= Barry Brown Jr. =

American basketball player (born 1996)

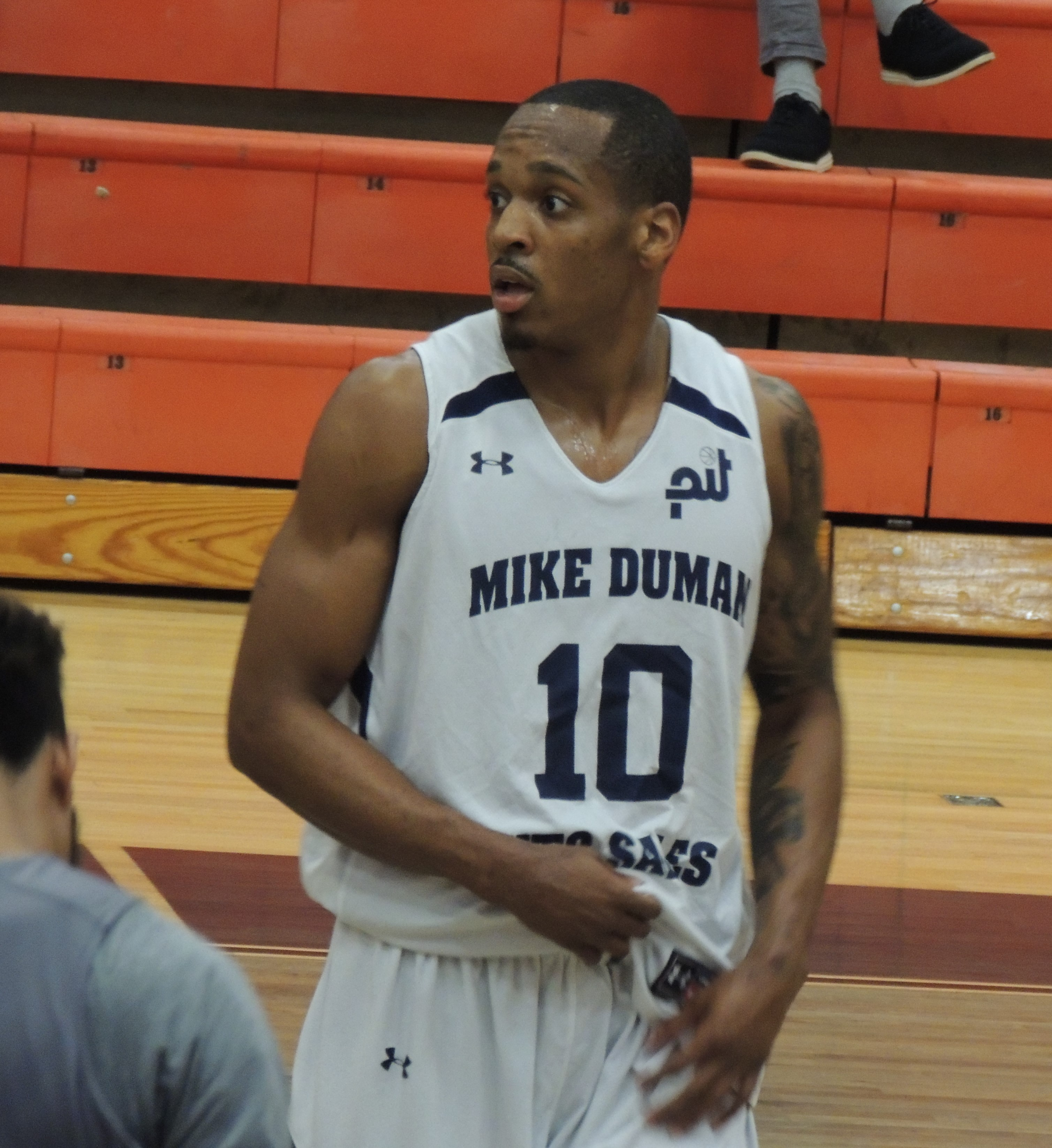
- Brown at the Portsmouth Invitational Tournament in 2019

No. 5 – Beijing Ducks
- Position: Point guard / shooting guard
- League: CBA

Personal information
- Born: December 21, 1996 (age 29) St. Petersburg, Florida, U.S.
- Listed height: 6 ft 3 in (1.91 m)
- Listed weight: 195 lb (88 kg)

Career information
- High school: Gibbs (St. Petersburg, Florida)
- College: Kansas State (2015–2019)
- NBA draft: 2019: undrafted
- Playing career: 2019–present

Career history
- 2019–2020: Iowa Wolves
- 2020–2021: Riesen Ludwigsburg
- 2022: Beijing Ducks
- 2022–2023: New Zealand Breakers
- 2023: Metropolitans 92
- 2023–2024: Reyer Venezia
- 2024: Guangzhou Loong Lions
- 2024–2026: Zhejiang Lions
- 2026–present: Beijing Ducks

Career highlights
- CBA Finals MVP (2025); CBA champion (2025); All-NBL Second Team (2023); NBL Best Sixth Man (2023); Big 12 Defensive Player of the Year (2019); First-team All-Big 12 (2019); Second-team All-Big 12 (2018); 2× Big 12 All-Defensive Team (2018, 2019); Big 12 All-Newcomer Team (2016)
- Stats at Basketball Reference

Barry Gerard Brown Jr. (born December 21, 1996) is an American professional basketball player for the Beijing Ducks of the Chinese Basketball Association (CBA). He won the CBA championship with the Lions, and was named Finals MVP in 2025. Brown played college basketball for the Kansas State Wildcats.

== Early life ==
Brown's father, Barry Brown Sr., was a star basketball player at Jacksonville and is now a middle school principal. Brown Jr. began playing basketball at a young age and was competing in recreational tournaments at the age of five. By the age of seven, he was playing in older age brackets in Amateur Athletic Union tournaments. Growing up, Brown also excelled at football.

== High school career ==
Brown attended Gibbs High School, where he was coached by Larry Murphy. He scored 36 points in the regional final as a senior to lead Gibbs to a win over Golden Gate. Brown was a three-star recruit and committed to Kansas State over offers from Florida Gulf Coast, Providence, Texas A&M and Wichita State.

== College career ==
Brown was named to the Big 12 All-Newcomer Team at the conclusion of his freshman season at Kansas State. As a sophomore, he averaged 11.7 points per game and set a Kansas State single-season record for steals with 82 takeaways. Brown scored a career-high 38 points in an 86–82 victory over Oklahoma State on January 9, 2018. After his junior season, Brown earned second-team All-Big 12 accolades as well as being named to the league's defensive team. He scored 18 points in both of the first two games of the NCAA Tournament, against Creighton and UMBC, and capably guarded the opposing team's best player. In the Sweet 16 of the NCAA Tournament, he scored 13 points in a 61–58 win over Kentucky including the decisive layup in the waning seconds. Brown averaged 15.9 points, 3.2 rebounds and 3.1 assists per game as a junior in leading Kansas State to 25 wins and an Elite Eight appearance. Following the season, he declared for the 2018 NBA draft but did not hire an agent to preserve his eligibility and ultimately opted to return to school.

== Professional career ==
=== Iowa Wolves (2019–2020) ===
After going undrafted in the 2019 NBA draft, Brown spent Summer League and pre-season with the Minnesota Timberwolves. He then joined the Iowa Wolves of the NBA G League for the 2019–20 season. On February 24, 2020, Brown contributed 35 points, five rebounds and three assists in a 152–148 loss to the South Bay Lakers.

=== Riesen Ludwigsburg (2020–2021) ===
On July 8, 2020, Brown signed with MHP Riesen Ludwigsburg of the Basketball Bundesliga (BBL).

=== Beijing Ducks (2022) ===
In January 2022, Brown joined the Beijing Ducks of the Chinese Basketball Association.

=== New Zealand Breakers (2022–2023) ===
On August 30, 2022, Brown signed with the New Zealand Breakers for the 2022–23 NBL season.

=== Metropolitans 92 (2023) ===
On May 15, 2023, Brown signed with Metropolitans 92 for the 2022–23 Pro A season.

=== Reyer Venezia (2023–2024) ===
On July 23, 2023, he signed with the Reyer Venezia Mestre of the Italian Lega Basket Serie A (LBA).

On January 31, 2024, he left the Reyer Venezia.

=== Guangzhou Loong Lions (2024) ===
On February 1, 2024, he joined the Guangzhou Loong Lions of the Chinese Basketball Association (CBA).

=== Zhejiang Lions (2024–present) ===
On August 4, 2024, Brown signed with Zhejiang Lions of the Chinese Basketball Association (CBA).

== Career statistics ==
Legend
| GP | Games played | GS | Games started | MPG | Minutes per game |
| FG% | Field goal percentage | 3P% | 3-point field goal percentage | FT% | Free throw percentage |
| RPG | Rebounds per game | APG | Assists per game | SPG | Steals per game |
| BPG | Blocks per game | PPG | Points per game | **Bold** | Career high |

=== College ===
| Year | Team | GP | GS | MPG | FG% | 3P% | FT% | RPG | APG | SPG | BPG | PPG |
|---|---|---|---|---|---|---|---|---|---|---|---|---|
| 2015–16 | Kansas State | 33 | 11 | 25.8 | .348 | **.336** | .635 | 2.8 | 1.5 | 1.2 | **.1** | 8.6 |
| 2016–17 | Kansas State | 35 | 35 | 32.7 | .412 | .326 | .615 | 3.2 | 2.4 | **2.3** | **.1** | 11.7 |
| 2017–18 | Kansas State | **37** | **37** | 34.7 | **.448** | .318 | **.772** | 3.1 | **3.2** | 1.8 | **.1** | **15.9** |
| 2018–19 | Kansas State | 34 | 34 | **35.0** | .433 | .298 | .710 | **4.1** | 2.8 | 1.9 | **.1** | 14.6 |
| Career | | 139 | 117 | 32.2 | .417 | .319 | .701 | 3.3 | 2.5 | 1.8 | .1 | 12.8 |

=== Basketball-Bundesliga ===
==== Regular season ====
| Year | Team | GP | GS | MPG | FG% | 3P% | FT% | RPG | APG | SPG | BPG | PPG |
|---|---|---|---|---|---|---|---|---|---|---|---|---|
| 2020–21 | Ludwigsburg | 28 | 3 | 18.8 | .434 | .351 | .787 | 2.3 | 1.7 | .8 | .1 | 12.9 |

==== Playoffs ====
| Year | Team | GP | GS | MPG | FG% | 3P% | FT% | RPG | APG | SPG | BPG | PPG |
|---|---|---|---|---|---|---|---|---|---|---|---|---|
| 2020–21 | Ludwigsburg | 5 | 0 | 16.7 | .389 | .28 | .9 | 1.2 | 1.0 | .6 | 0 | 11.6 |

=== CBA ===
==== Regular season ====
| Year | Team | GP | GS | MPG | FG% | 3P% | FT% | RPG | APG | SPG | BPG | PPG |
|---|---|---|---|---|---|---|---|---|---|---|---|---|
| 2021–22 | Beijing Ducks | 5 | 2 | 18.4 | .429 | .333 | .769 | 3.2 | 2.0 | .8 | .6 | 17.4 |

Source: basketball-stats.de (Stand: 29. March 2022)
