= Kenneth Lofton Jr. =

American basketball player (born 2002)

No. 2 – Hapoel Jerusalem
- Position: Power forward / center
- League: Israeli Basketball Premier League; EuroCup

Personal information
- Born: August 14, 2002 (age 24) Port Arthur, Texas, U.S.
- Listed height: 6 ft 6 in (1.98 m)
- Listed weight: 275 lb (125 kg)

Career information
- High school: Memorial (Port Arthur, Texas)
- College: Louisiana Tech (2020–2022)
- NBA draft: 2022: undrafted
- Playing career: 2022–present

Career history
- 2022–2023: Memphis Grizzlies
- 2022–2023: →Memphis Hustle
- 2023–2024: Philadelphia 76ers
- 2023–2024: →Delaware Blue Coats
- 2024: Utah Jazz
- 2024: →Salt Lake City Stars
- 2024–2026: Shanghai Sharks
- 2026–present: Hapoel Jerusalem

Career highlights
- CBA champion (2026); CBA International MVP (2025); 2× CBA Club Cup champion (2025, 2026); CBA Club Cup Finals MVP (2026); CBA All-International Team (2025); 2× CBA All-Star (2025, 2026); NBA G League Rookie of the Year (2023); 2× All-NBA G League First Team (2023, 2024); NBA G League All-Rookie Team (2023); 2× NBA G League Next Up Game (2023, 2024); Conference USA Freshman of the Year (2021); First-team All-Conference USA (2022); Third-team All-Conference USA (2021)
- Stats at NBA.com
- Stats at Basketball Reference
Medals
Men's basketball
Representing the United States
FIBA Under-19 World Cup
| Gold medal – first place | 2021 Latvia | Team |

Kenneth Wayne Lofton Jr. (born August 14, 2002) is an American professional basketball player for Hapoel Jerusalem of the Israeli Basketball Premier League and the EuroCup. He played college basketball for the Louisiana Tech Bulldogs. He then played for the Memphis Grizzlies, Philadelphia 76ers, and Utah Jazz of the National Basketball Association (NBA).

He is a two-time all-Conference USA selection. Playing in the G League, he was named 2023 G League Rookie of the Year , and was named All-G League First Team during both his two seasons in the league. Playing with the Shanghai Sharks, he earned the 2025 Chinese League MVP award.

== Early life ==
Kenneth Wayne Lofton Jr., born August 14, 2002 in Port Arthur, Texas, is the son of Kenneth Sr. and Gina Duhon Lofton. Lofton is not related to the former Major League baseball player Kenny Lofton. His father served in the U.S. Army and attended Lamar University, after which he worked for the U.S. Postal Service for 18 years. His grandfather Gene "Rock" Duhon, a member of the Southern University Track Hall of Fame, competed at the U.S. Olympic Track and Field Trials. He has two siblings, Geremiah and his older sister Kennedi, who played women's basketball for the Southern Lady Jaguars from 2017–20.

== High school career ==
Lofton played basketball for Memorial High School in Port Arthur, Texas, while also playing defensive end for the football team. He was initially a 6-foot-2 guard in basketball, and became a post player power forward by his senior year following a four-inch growth spurt. He won a 5A Texas state title in his sophomore season in 2018. As a junior, he averaged 15 points and 12 rebounds per game, and was named 5A First Team All-District and 5A All-Region.

As a senior, he averaged 17 points, 10 rebounds, and 3 assists per game,while shooting 64% from the field, leading his team to a share of the 21–5A district title. Lofton earned 5A All-State honors, was a McDonald's All-American nominee, and was named All-Greater Houston Third Team, District Offensive Player of the Year, and Texas Association of Basketball Coaches (TABC) 5A All-Region. He signed a National Letter of Intent to play college basketball for Louisiana Tech.

== College career (2020–2022) ==
Playing for Louisiana Tech, Lofton was listed as being 6-foot-7, and 275 pounds, at 19 years of age, and was noted for his combination of size and athleticism. On March 28, 2021, Lofton recorded a freshman season-high 27 points and 13 rebounds, making a game-winning shot with 0.3 seconds left, in a 76–74 win over Colorado State at the National Invitational Tournament (NIT) third place game. He was an NIT All-Tournament Team selection. As a freshman, in 32 games Lofton averaged 22.8 minutes, 12.2 points, 7.5 rebounds,1.5 assists, and 1.0 steals per game, while shooting 56.7% from the floor. He earned Third Team All-Conference USA and Conference USA Freshman of the Year honors, and was named to the Conference USA All-Freshman Team He was named Conference USA Freshman of the Week nine times, tied for third-most in league history. Lofton was the first Louisiana Tech freshman to lead the team in rebounding since Paul Millsap in 2003–04.

As a sophomore, in 33 games Lofton averaged 27.0 minutes, 16.5 points (5th in Conference USA), 10.5 rebounds (leading the conference), 2.8 assists, and 1.2 steals per game, while leading the conference in total rebounds (347) and shooting 53.9% (2nd) from the floor. He had 17 double-doubles, leading the conference and 10th-most in the nation. He was named to the First Team All-Conference USA, 2022 All-CUSA Tournament, Naismith Trophy Midseason Team, National Association of Basketball Coaches (NABC) First Team All-District 11, and Louisiana Associations of Basketball Coaches (LABC) Louisiana Major College Player of the Year. On March 22, 2022, Lofton declared for the 2022 NBA draft. He did not sign with an agent, allowing him the flexibility to return to Louisiana Tech.

== Professional career ==
=== Memphis Grizzlies / Memphis Hustle (2022–2023) ===
After going undrafted in the 2022 NBA draft, Lofton signed a two-way contract with the Memphis Grizzlies of the National Basketball Association (NBA) on July 2, 2022. He made his NBA debut on October 22, 2022. In 2022–23 with the Grizzlies, in 24 games he averaged 7.3 minutes, 5.0 points, 2.1 rebounds, and 0.8 assists per game, while shooting 52.9% from the floor.

Lofton also played for the G League team of the Grizzlies, the Memphis Hustle, in 2022–23 and in 30 games averaged 29.4 minutes, 22.3 points, 10.1 rebounds, 3.6 assists, and1.2 steals per game, while shooting 54.6% from the field. He was named to the G League's inaugural Next Up Game, the league's version of the NBA All-Star Game, for the 2022–23 season. On March 31, 2023, Lofton was awarded the NBA G League Rookie of the Year Award, and that season he was also named All-NBA G League 1st Team, All-Rookie 1st Team, NBA G League Showcase First Team, and an All Star. On April 8, 2023, the Grizzlies converted Lofton's deal into a standard, multi-year NBA contract.

On April 9, 2023, Lofton scored a career-high 42 points and put up a career-high 14 rebounds in a 115–100 loss to the Oklahoma City Thunder in his first game as a starter. He also became the first player in NBA history to put up at least 40 points and 10 rebounds in a player's first career start, since starts were officially tracked since the 1970–71 season. In 2023–24 with the Grizzlies, in 15 games he averaged 6.6 minutes, 2.6 points, 1.0 rebounds, and 0.9 assists per game. That season he also played two games with the Hustle, in which he averaged 24.0 points and 11.5 rebounds per game.

On December 18, 2023, Lofton was waived by the Grizzlies.

=== Philadelphia 76ers / Delaware Blue Coats (2023–2024) ===
On December 23, 2023, Lofton signed a two-way contract with the Philadelphia 76ers of the NBA and their G League affiliate, the Delaware Blue Coats. In 2023–24 with Philadelphia, in 2 games he averaged 4.4 minutes, 1.0 points, and 1.5 rebounds per game. In 11 games with the Delaware Blue Coats, he averaged 29.8 minutes, 26.4 points, 9.1 rebounds, 4.0 assists, 0.9 steals, and 1.6 blocks per game, while shooting 55.1% from the floor.

On March 1, 2024, Lofton was waived.

=== Utah Jazz / Salt Lake City Stars (2024) ===
On March 11, 2024, Lofton signed with the Utah Jazz of the NBA. In 2024 with Utah, in 4 games he averaged 22.7 minutes, 13.8 points, 5.0 rebounds, 4.8 assists, and 0.8 steals per game, shooting 60.0% from the floor and 81.8% from the free throw line. Playing for their G League team the Salt Lake City Stars, in 8 games he averaged 30.4 minutes, 23.4 points, 10.1 rebounds, 4.6 assists, 1.2 steals, and 0.9 blocks per game, while shooting 58.3% from the floor. He was named 2024 All-NBA G League First Team.

However, he was waived on July 24, 2024.

On August 15, 2024, Lofton signed a one-year contract with the Chicago Bulls, but was waived on October 17.

=== Shanghai Sharks (2024–2026) ===
On October 29, 2024, Lofton signed with the Shanghai Sharks of the Chinese Basketball Association. In the 2024-2025 season, he averaged 24.4 points, 12.6 rebounds (4th in the league), 6.5 assists, 1.6 steals, and 0.7 blocks in 31.5 minutes per game, shooting 52.5% from the floor, while appearing in 37 regular season games with them. Lofton took home the CBA Best International Player award. The Sharks would eventually fall short to the Guangdong Southern Tigers in the playoffs, losing to them in 3 games with Lofton scoring a team-high 24 points in the deciding game.

On July 2, 2025, Lofton joined the Boston Celtics on their NBA Summer League roster in Las Vegas, Nevada. At the time, he was described as having "a body built like that of an NFL linebacker." However, he did not make the final roster cut and eventually re-signed with the Sharks.

In the 2025-26 season with the Sharks, he averaged 18.6 minutes, 12.3 points, 5.6 rebounds, 3.4 assists, and 0.9 steals per game, shooting 51.8% from the floor, while appearing in 45 games.

=== Hapoel Jerusalem (2026–present) ===
On July 26, 2026, Lofton signed a contract that will run through the end of the 2026-27 season with Hapoel Jerusalem of the Israeli Basketball Premier League and the EuroCup.

== National team career ==
Lofton represented the United States at the 2021 FIBA Under-19 World Cup in Latvia. He averaged 13.1 points and 5.3 rebounds per game, shooting 64.9% from the field (leading all of the 2021 FIBA U19 World Cup, and the highest shooting percentage by a U19 USA player since 2013), helping Team USA win the gold medal. Lofton led the US in a come-from-behind victory against France in the final, with 15 of his team-high 16 points coming in the second half to secure an 83–81 win in the gold medal game.

== Career statistics ==
Legend
| GP | Games played | GS | Games started | MPG | Minutes per game |
| FG% | Field goal percentage | 3P% | 3-point field goal percentage | FT% | Free throw percentage |
| RPG | Rebounds per game | APG | Assists per game | SPG | Steals per game |
| BPG | Blocks per game | PPG | Points per game | **Bold** | Career high |

=== NBA ===
==== Regular season ====
| Year | Team | GP | GS | MPG | FG% | 3P% | FT% | RPG | APG | SPG | BPG | PPG |
|---|---|---|---|---|---|---|---|---|---|---|---|---|
| 2022–23 | Memphis | **24** | **1** | 7.3 | .527 | **.353** | .593 | 2.1 | .8 | .2 | .1 | 5.0 |
| 2023–24 | Memphis | 15 | 0 | 6.6 | .378 | .300 | .533 | 1.0 | .9 | .2 | .2 | 2.6 |
| 2023–24 | Philadelphia | 2 | 0 | 4.4 | .167 | .000 | — | 1.5 | .0 | .0 | .0 | 1.0 |
| 2023–24 | Utah | 4 | 0 | **22.7** | **.600** | .333 | **.818** | **5.0** | **4.8** | **.8** | **.5** | **13.8** |
| Career | | 45 | 1 | 8.3 | .497 | .317 | .623 | 2.0 | 1.2 | .2 | .2 | 4.8 |

==== Playoffs ====
| Year | Team | GP | GS | MPG | FG% | 3P% | FT% | RPG | APG | SPG | BPG | PPG |
|---|---|---|---|---|---|---|---|---|---|---|---|---|
| 2023 | Memphis | 4 | 0 | 3.0 | .375 | .000 | .500 | .8 | .3 | .0 | .0 | 1.8 |
| Career | | 4 | 0 | 3.0 | .375 | .000 | .500 | .8 | .3 | .0 | .0 | 1.8 |

=== College ===
| Year | Team | GP | GS | MPG | FG% | 3P% | FT% | RPG | APG | SPG | BPG | PPG |
|---|---|---|---|---|---|---|---|---|---|---|---|---|
| 2020–21 | Louisiana Tech | 32 | 28 | 22.8 | **.567** | – | .596 | 7.5 | 1.5 | 1.0 | **.7** | 12.2 |
| 2021–22 | Louisiana Tech | **33** | **33** | **27.0** | .539 | **.200** | **.672** | **10.5** | **2.8** | **1.2** | **.7** | **16.5** |
| Career | | 65 | 61 | 24.9 | .550 | .200 | .637 | 9.0 | 2.1 | 1.1 | .7 | 14.3 |
