= Eric Stokes (cornerback) =

American football player (born 1999)

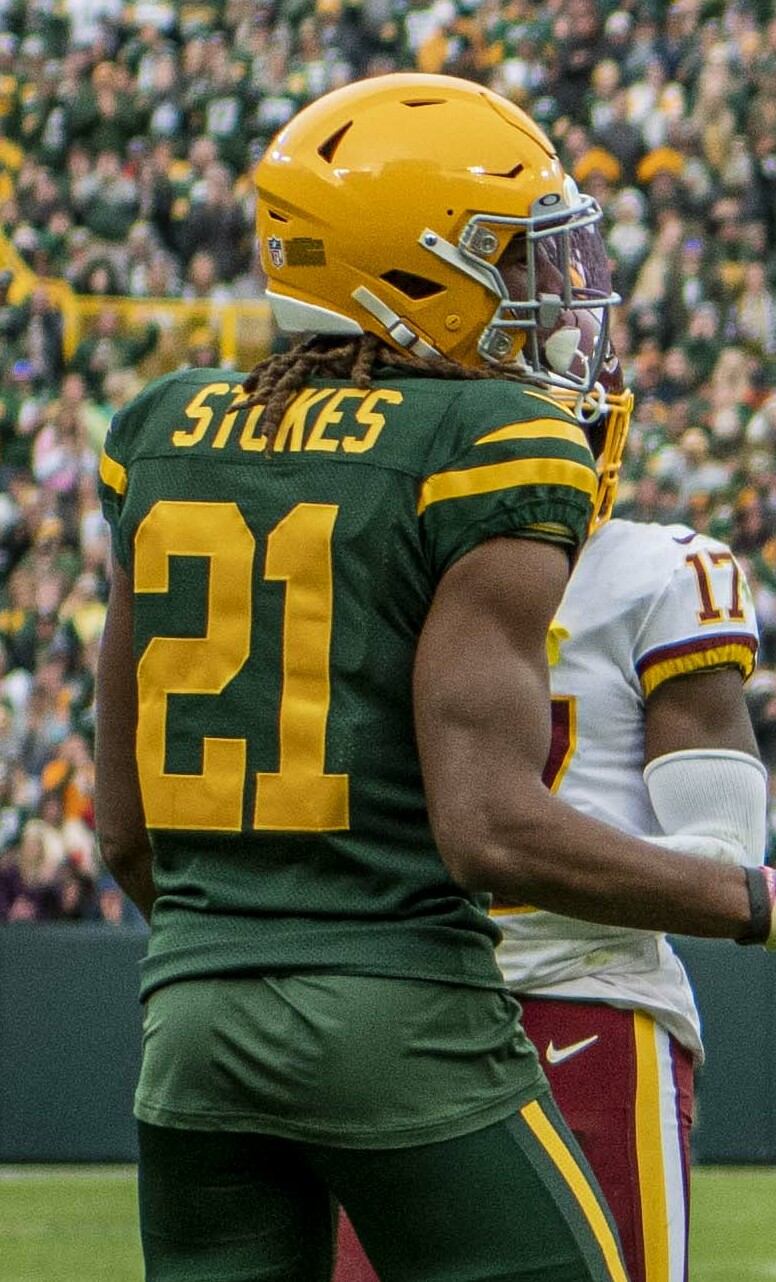
- Stokes with the Green Bay Packers in 2021

No. 5 – Las Vegas Raiders
- Position: Cornerback
- Roster status: Active

Personal information
- Born: March 1, 1999 (age 27); Covington, Georgia, U.S.
- Listed height: 6 ft 1 in (1.85 m)
- Listed weight: 193 lb (88 kg)

Career information
- High school: Eastside (Covington)
- College: Georgia (2017–2020)
- NFL draft: 2021: 1st round, 29th overall pick

Career history
- Green Bay Packers (2021–2024); Las Vegas Raiders (2025–present)

Awards and highlights
- First-team All-SEC (2020); Second-team All-SEC (2019)

Career NFL statistics as of Week 7, 2026
- Total tackles: 203
- Sacks: 1
- Forced fumbles: 1
- Fumble recoveries: 1
- Pass deflections: 21
- Interceptions: 1
- Stats at Pro Football Reference

Eric Jamane Stokes (born March 1, 1999) is an American professional football cornerback for the Las Vegas Raiders of the National Football League (NFL). He played college football for the Georgia Bulldogs and was selected by the Green Bay Packers in the first round of the 2021 NFL draft.

== Early life ==
Stokes attended Eastside High School in Covington, Georgia, where he played football and ran track. He committed to play college football at the University of Georgia in 2017. In February 2025, Eastside High School retired Stokes' number 5 football jersey in recognition of his accomplishments as a defensive back and running back.

== College career ==
After redshirting his first year at Georgia in 2017, Stokes played in 13 of 14 games with three starts in 2018 and finished the season with 20 tackles. As a sophomore in 2019, he started 13 of 14 games, recording 38 tackles and one sack. He returned as a starter in 2020 where he recorded his first career interception, which he returned for a touchdown, in the opening game of the season. He finished the season with four interceptions and two touchdowns.

== Professional career ==
Pre-draft measurables
Height	Weight	Arm length	Hand span	Wingspan	40-yard dash	10-yard split	20-yard split	20-yard shuttle	Three-cone drill	Vertical jump	Broad jump	Bench press
6 ft 0 5/8 in (1.84 m)	194 lb (88 kg)	32 3/4 in (0.83 m)	9 1/8 in (0.23 m)	6 ft 6 in (1.98 m)	4.29 s	1.50 s	2.56 s	4.36 s	6.96 s	38.5 in (0.98 m)	10 ft 8 in (3.25 m)	14 reps
All values from Pro Day

=== Green Bay Packers ===
The Green Bay Packers selected Stokes in the first round (29th overall) of the 2021 NFL draft. He was the fifth cornerback drafted in 2021.

He signed his four-year rookie contract on June 2, 2021, worth $11.93 million, including a $6.03 million signing bonus.

Stokes was named the third outside cornerback on the depth chart to start the season. Following continued struggles and injuries by starter Kevin King through the first two weeks of the season, Stokes was named the starter opposite cornerback Jaire Alexander ahead of the Packers' Week 3 game against the San Francisco 49ers. The following week, he recorded his first NFL interception off a pass from Ben Roethlisberger during a 27–17 victory over the Pittsburgh Steelers. Starting from Week 5, and with exception of the Packers' Week 9 game against the Kansas City Chiefs, Stokes started every game for the Packers.

Stokes entered the 2022 season as the starting cornerback for the Packers. His play declined as the Packers defense struggled in his sophomore season. During a Week 9 loss to the Detroit Lions, he exited the game with an ankle injury. Head coach Matt LaFleur later informed the press that Stokes would miss the rest of the season with his injury.

Stokes began the 2023 season on the reserve/physically unable to perform list. He was activated on October 21, 2023, but placed on injured reserve four days later with a hamstring injury. He was activated on December 16 and returned to the injured reserve list two weeks later.

On May 2, 2024, the Packers declined the fifth-year option on Stokes' contract, making him a free agent after the 2024 season.

=== Las Vegas Raiders ===
On March 13, 2025, Stokes signed a one-year, $4 million contract with the Las Vegas Raiders. Stokes started 16 of 17 games, missing one game due to a minor injury. Overall Stokes played 98% of the Raiders' defensive snaps and recorded 53 tackles (35 solo) and 5 passes defended. His overall PFF grade of 73.6 ranked Stokes 18th out of 114 cornerbacks for the season. NFL.com named Stokes the Raiders' 2025 "unsung hero" for allowing only 0.6 yards per snap (first among all NFL cornerbacks) and a team low passer rating allowed of 76.9. In addition, Stokes allowed only 329 passing yards for the season while leading a young secondary unit for the Raiders.

On March 9, 2026, Stokes signed a three-year, $30 million contract extension with the Raiders.

== NFL career statistics ==
Legend
**Bold**	Career high

=== Regular season ===
Year	Team	Games		Tackles					Interceptions						Fumbles				
Year	Team	GP	GS	Cmb	Solo	Ast	Sck	TFL	Int	Yds	Avg	Lng	TD	PD	FF	Fum	FR	Yds	TD
2021	GB	16	14	**55**	**43**	12	0.0	0	**1**	0	0.0	0	0	**14**	0	0	0	0	0
2022	GB	9	9	26	21	5	0.0	0	0	0	0.0	0	0	0	0	0	0	0	0
2023	GB	3	2	6	5	1	0.0	1	0	0	0.0	0	0	0	0	0	0	0	0
2024	GB	**17**	7	41	29	12	0.0	0	0	0	0.0	0	0	0	0	0	0	0	0
2025	LV	16	**16**	53	35	**18**	0.0	**3**	0	0	0.0	0	0	5	0	0	0	0	0
Career		61	48	181	133	48	0.0	4	1	0	0.0	0	0	19	0	0	0	0	0

=== Postseason ===
Year	Team	Games		Tackles					Interceptions						Fumbles				
Year	Team	GP	GS	Cmb	Solo	Ast	Sck	TFL	Int	Yds	Avg	Lng	TD	PD	FF	Fum	FR	Yds	TD
2021	GB	**1**	**1**	**4**	**3**	**1**	0.0	0	0	0	0.0	0	0	0	0	0	0	0	0
2024	GB	**1**	**1**	0	0	0	0.0	0	0	0	0.0	0	0	0	0	0	0	0	0
Career		1	1	4	3	1	0.0	0	0	0	0.0	0	0	0	0	0	0	0	0
