= Josh Carlton =

American basketball player (born 1999)

Free agent
- Position: Center

Personal information
- Born: February 26, 1999 (age 27) Silver Spring, Maryland, U.S.
- Listed height: 6 ft 10 in (2.08 m)
- Listed weight: 245 lb (111 kg)

Career information
- High school: South Central (Winterville, North Carolina); DeMatha Catholic (Hyattsville, Maryland)
- College: UConn (2017–2021); Houston (2021–2022)
- NBA draft: 2022: undrafted
- Playing career: 2022–present

Career history
- 2022–2023: Le Mans
- 2023: Metropolitans 92
- 2023–2024: Darüşşafaka
- 2024: Zenit Saint Petersburg
- 2024–2025: Hong Kong Bulls
- 2024–2026: Zhejiang Lions

Career highlights
- CBA champion (2025); 2× NBL champion (2024, 2025); First-team All-AAC (2022); AAC Most Improved Player (2019)

Joshua Euria Carlton (born February 26, 1999) is an American professional basketball player who last played for Zhejiang Lions of the Chinese Basketball Association (CBA). He played college basketball for the UConn Huskies and the Houston Cougars.

== High school career ==
Carlton played his freshman season at South Central High School in Winterville, North Carolina. His family moved to the Washington, D.C. area after his sophomore season, and he enrolled at DeMatha Catholic High School. Carlton befriended teammate and future NBA player Markelle Fultz at DeMatha. Carlton averaged 11.1 points, 11.7 rebounds, and 3.2 blocks per game and helped the team to a 33–5 record as a junior. As a senior, after Fultz graduated, Carlton averaged 14.4 points, 11.4 rebounds, and 3.1 blocks per game on a 25–10 record. In September 2016, he committed to playing college basketball for UConn over offers from Cincinnati, USC, Providence, Maryland and Kansas State.

== College career ==
As a freshman, Carlton averaged 4.4 points and 3.7 rebounds per game. He averaged nine points and 6.2 rebounds per game as a sophomore, earning AAC Most Improved Player honors. Carlton averaged 7.8 points and 6.1 rebounds per game as a junior. During his senior season, he lost his starting center role to Adama Sanogo and posted 3.5 points and 3.7 rebounds per game. Following the season, Carlton took advantage of the additional season of eligibility granted by the NCAA due to the COVID-19 pandemic and entered the transfer portal, ultimately transferring to Houston over East Carolina, Pittsburgh and Wake Forest. He focused on losing weight and received more playing time due to injuries to Marcus Sasser and Tramon Mark. On January 5, 2022, Carlton scored a career-high 30 points and had 11 rebounds in a 83–66 win over South Florida. He was named to the First Team All-AAC.

== Professional career ==
On August 6, 2022, Carlton signed with Le Mans of the French Pro A.

On August 13, 2023, he signed with Metropolitans 92 of the French LNB Pro A.

On December 18, 2023, he signed with Darüşşafaka Lassa of the Basketbol Süper Ligi (BSL).

== Career statistics ==
Legend
GP	Games played	GS	Games started	MPG	Minutes per game
FG%	Field goal percentage	3P%	3-point field goal percentage	FT%	Free throw percentage
RPG	Rebounds per game	APG	Assists per game	SPG	Steals per game
BPG	Blocks per game	PPG	Points per game	**Bold**	Career high

=== College ===
Year	Team	GP	GS	MPG	FG%	3P%	FT%	RPG	APG	SPG	BPG	PPG
2017–18	UConn	32	17	15.2	.514	–	**.667**	3.7	.3	.3	.8	4.4
2018–19	UConn	33	**33**	**22.2**	.607	–	.627	**6.2**	.4	.4	**1.8**	9.0
2019–20	UConn	31	31	21.3	.502	–	.500	6.1	.7	.4	1.1	7.8
2020–21	UConn	19	1	11.3	.482	–	.591	3.7	.4	.4	.4	3.5
2021–22	Houston	**38**	28	21.7	**.626**	**1.000**	.579	**6.2**	**.8**	**.5**	1.2	**11.6**
Career		153	110	18.2	.567	1.000	.590	5.3	.5	.4	1.1	7.8
