= Dez Wells =

American basketball player

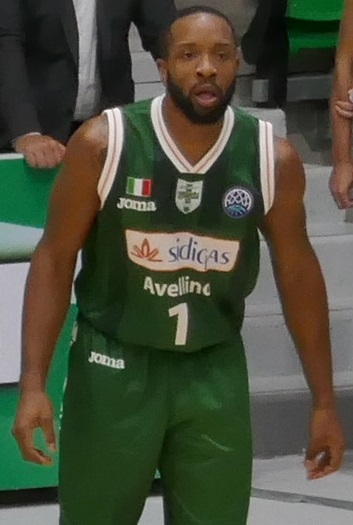
- Wells with Scandone Avellino in 2018

No. 44 – Zhejiang Lions
- Position: Shooting guard / small forward
- League: CBA

Personal information
- Born: April 15, 1992 (age 34) Raleigh, North Carolina, U.S.
- Listed height: 6 ft 4 in (1.93 m)
- Listed weight: 215 lb (98 kg)

Career information
- High school: Word of God Academy (Raleigh, North Carolina); Hargrave Military Academy (Chatham, Virginia)
- College: Xavier (2011–2012); Maryland (2012–2015)
- NBA draft: 2015: undrafted
- Playing career: 2015–present

Career history
- 2015–2016: Oklahoma City Blue
- 2016: Doxa Lefkadas
- 2017: Oklahoma City Blue
- 2017–2018: Scandone Avellino
- 2018–2019: Oklahoma City Blue
- 2019: VL Pesaro
- 2019: San Miguel Beermen
- 2019–2020: Zhejiang Lions
- 2020–2021: Jiangsu Dragons
- 2021–2022: Qingdao Eagles
- 2023: Zhejiang Lions
- 2023: Anhui Wenyi
- 2023: Jilin Northeast Tigers
- 2023–2024: Hapoel Tel Aviv
- 2024: Changsha Wantian Yongsheng
- 2024: Liaoning Flying Leopards
- 2025: Changsha Yongsheng
- 2025–2026: Liaoning Flying Leopards
- 2026–present: Zhejiang Lions

Career highlights
- AP honorable mention All-American (2015); First-team All-Big Ten – Coaches (2015); Second-team All-Big Ten – Media (2015); Third-team All-ACC (2014); Atlantic 10 All-Rookie Team (2012)
- Stats at Basketball Reference

Dezmine Jamaal Lavonte Wells (born April 15, 1992) is an American professional basketball player for the Zhejiang Lions of the Chinese Basketball Association (CBA). He played college basketball for the Xavier Musketeers and Maryland Terrapins.

== High school career ==
Wells played high school basketball at Word of God Academy in Raleigh, North Carolina where he was a friend of and teammate with future Houston Rockets guard John Wall.

== College career ==
Wells began his college career at Xavier, where he was an Atlantic 10 All-Rookie Team selection. He was expelled in 2012 due to a "serious violation" of the code of student conduct after a female student alleged he committed sexual assault. Wells also was suspended by the NCAA for being involved in a huge fight after a game against the Cincinnati Bearcats in December 2011. A grand jury did not indict him for the assault, and Wells later sued the university for false accusation. The school was asked to hold off deciding their case until after the criminal case was settled and the prosecutor slammed the school for their unfair procedures. The issue was settled out of court after a judge ruled the lawsuit could go forward to discovery.

The NCAA waived the usual redshirt year requirement for Wells, making him eligible immediately at another university. He transferred to Maryland and led the team in scoring with 13.1 points per game as a sophomore. The team missed the NCAA Tournament despite defeating Duke twice.

As a junior, Wells averaged 14.9 points per game for the Terrapins. Maryland again missed the NCAA Tournament.

A wrist injury caused Wells to miss a month of games as a senior. Nevertheless, he scored 26 points and added seven rebounds and four assists in Maryland's 59–53 win over fifth-ranked Wisconsin. He was a first-team All-Big Ten selection. Maryland coach Mark Turgeon said Wells "was not going to let us lose." Wells's last collegiate game was against West Virginia in Columbus, Ohio in the Round of 32 of the 2015 NCAA Men's Division I Basketball Tournament. He tallied nine points and eight turnovers in a 69–59 loss.

== Professional career ==
=== Oklahoma City Blue (2015–2016) ===
ESPN's Chad Ford considered Wells a potential second-round pick in the 2015 NBA draft, but he went undrafted. He also struggled dribbling with his left hand, which lowered his draft stock. He subsequently joined the Washington Wizards for the 2015 NBA Summer League. However, he was later ruled out of Summer League play due to thumb injury. On September 25, 2015, Wells signed with the Oklahoma City Thunder. However, he was waived on October 22 after appearing in one preseason game. On November 3, he was acquired by the Oklahoma City Blue as an affiliate player from the Thunder. On November 14, he made his professional debut in a 110–104 loss to the Austin Spurs, recording 19 points, five rebounds, two assists and one steal. On March 31, he was waived by the Blue after suffering a season-ending injury.

=== Greece (2016) ===
In July 2016, Wells signed with Tigers Tübingen of the Basketball Bundesliga, but his contract was voided on August 18 after he didn't pass his physical. On September 23, 2016, Wells signed with Doxa Lefkadas of the Greek Basket League. He left the team after appearing in 9 games.

=== Scandone Avellino and Oklahoma City Blue (2017–2019) ===
On January 18, 2017, he was acquired by the Oklahoma City Blue. Wells was added to the Oklahoma City Blue training camp roster on October 23, 2018.

=== VL Pesaro (2019) ===
On April 10, 2019, he has signed a contract with VL Pesaro of the Italian LBA.

=== San Miguel Beermen (2019) ===
In August 2019, Wells joined San Miguel Beermen of the Philippine Basketball Association for the East Asia Super League Terrific 12 and the PBA Governors' Cup. In his PBA debut, Wells had an impressive statline of 42 points, 8 rebounds and 7 assists in a 130–119 win over Phoenix Fuelmasters. He averaged 37.1 points, 7.9 rebounds, 4.8 assists, 2.0 steals and 1.0 block per game.

=== Zhejiang Lions (2019–2020) ===
Wells spent much of the 2019–20 season with Zhejiang Lions in China. He averaged 31.1 points, 7.6 rebounds, 5.0 assists and 3.2 steals per game.

=== Jiangsu Dragons (2020–2021) ===
On September 21, 2020, Wells signed with Jiangsu Dragons of the Chinese league. On April 10, 2021, Wells scored 43 points in a 94–98 losing effort to the Tianjin Pioneers.

=== Qingdao Eagles (2021–2022) ===
On December 6, 2021, Wells signed with Qingdao Eagles of the Chinese league.

=== Hapoel Tel Aviv (2023–2024) ===
In December 2023, Wells joined Hapoel Tel Aviv of the Israeli Premier league. At his first game with the team, 2 days after he joined, he scored 16 points in a Eurocap game against Hamburg.

== Personal life ==
Wells is the son of Pamela Wells, who was an All-American basketball player at St. Augustine's College in Raleigh, N.C. He has two sisters, Jocelyn Brand and Jazmine Wilson and majored in American Studies. He graduated from the University of Maryland with a degree in American Studies on December 19, 2015.
