= Hu Jinqiu =

Chinese basketball player (born 1997)

No. 21 – Zhejiang Lions
- Position: Center
- League: Chinese Basketball Association

Personal information
- Born: September 24, 1997 (age 29) Korla, Xinjiang, China
- Listed height: 6 ft 11 in (2.11 m)

Career information
- Playing career: 2015–present

Career history
- 2015–present: Zhejiang Guangsha Lions

Career highlights
- CBA champion (2025); CBA MVP (2025)
Medals
Men's basketball
Representing China
Asian Games
Bronze medal – third place	2022 Hangzhou
FIBA Asia Cup
Silver medal – second place	2025 Saudi Arabia
FIBA Asia Under-16 Championship
Gold medal – first place	2013 Tehran

Hu Jinqiu (Chinese: 胡金秋, born September 24, 1997) is a Chinese professional basketball player who plays for the Zhejiang Guangsha Lions of the Chinese Basketball Association.

He represented China's national basketball team at the 2016 FIBA Asia Challenge in Tehran, Iran, where he led his team in minutes, points and rebounds.

Hu was included in China's squad for the 2023 FIBA Basketball World Cup qualification.
