= NBA G League Next Up Game =

The NBA G League Next Up Game (formerly NBA G League Up Next Game and NBA G League Next Gem Game) is an annual mid-season all-star basketball event held by the NBA G League to celebrate the league's best players up to that point of the season. After the 2022 NBA G League Next Gem Game, the Up Next Game became the monicker for the annual exhibition game by the G League held during the NBA All-Star Weekend in 2023. In 2024, the event was converted from a two-team game to a four-team tournament. The 2023 event, the NBA G League Next Up Game, was a two-team game held in Salt Lake City under the naming rights sponsorship of AT&T. I.e., the game became the 2024 NBA G League Up Next Game presented by AT&T. AT&T held the naming rights sponsorship in 2025 and 2026 as well. In 2026, the game name was revised as the 2026 NBA G League Next Up Game presented by AT&T. As the NBA G League is the official development league of the NBA, the NBA traces the heritage of the Next Up Game back to the NBA Development League All-Star Game, which started in 2007 as an event of the NBA Development League.

== History ==
The G League substituted a G League International Challenge in 2018 and 2019 for the All-Star Game and had no All-star events in 2020 and 2021. The 2022 NBA G League Next Gem Game, which was not an all-star game, was held in Cleveland. The 2023 NBA G League Next Up Game took place in Salt Lake City. The 2024 NBA G League Up Next Game presented by AT&T happened in Indianapolis. The 2025 NBA G League Up Next Game presented by AT&T happened in San Francisco. The 2026 NBA G League Next Up Game presented by AT&T took place at the Los Angeles Convention Center.

=== Results ===
Note: Venue names are listed as of the date of the All-Star Game.

Date	Result	Host arena	Host city	MVP	Name	Notes	Ref
February 20, 2022	Cleveland Charge 96 – 92 NBA G League Ignite	Wolstein Center	Cleveland, OH	Not selected	NBA G League Next Gen Game	No MVP, no all-star selections	
February 19, 2023	Team Luka 178 – 162 Team Scoot	Jon M. Huntsman Center	Salt Lake City, UT	Luka Garza	NBA G League Next Up Game	(2) 12-man teams	
February 18, 2024	Team Earn Your Leisure 30 – 21 Team Ball Is Life	Galef Fieldhouse	Indianapolis, IN	Trevelin Queen	NBA G League Up Next Game presented by AT&T	(4) 7-man teams managed by influencers	
February 16, 2025	Team Braxton 30 – 26 Team Swish Cultures	Moscone Center	San Francisco, CA	Kevon Harris	NBA G League Up Next Game presented by AT&T	(4) 7-man teams managed by influencers	
February 15, 2026	Team Black 31 – 29 Team White	Los Angeles Convention Center	Los Angeles, CA	James Akinjo	NBA G League Next Up Game presented by AT&T	(4) 7-man teams	
