= Sun Minghui =

Chinese basketball player

Sun Minghui 孙铭徽
No. 17 – Zhejiang Lions
- Position: Point guard
- League: CBA

Personal information
- Born: 26 April 1996 (age 30) Jilin City, Jilin, China
- Listed height: 6 ft 2 in (1.88 m)
- Listed weight: 173 lb (78 kg)

Career information
- NBA draft: 2018: undrafted
- Playing career: 2015–present

Career history
- 2015–present: Zhejiang Lions

Career highlights
- CBA champion (2025)
Medals
Men's basketball
Representing China
Asian Games
Gold medal – first place	2018 Jakarta
FIBA Asia Under-18 Championship
Gold medal – first place	2014 Doha

Sun Minghui (born April 26, 1996) is a Chinese basketball player who plays in the guard position for China and currently plays for Chinese club Zhejiang Lions.

He was included in the Chinese squad for the 2019 FIBA Basketball World Cup.

Later, he was included in China's squad for the 2023 FIBA Basketball World Cup qualification.
