= Ashton Hagans =

American basketball player (born 1999)

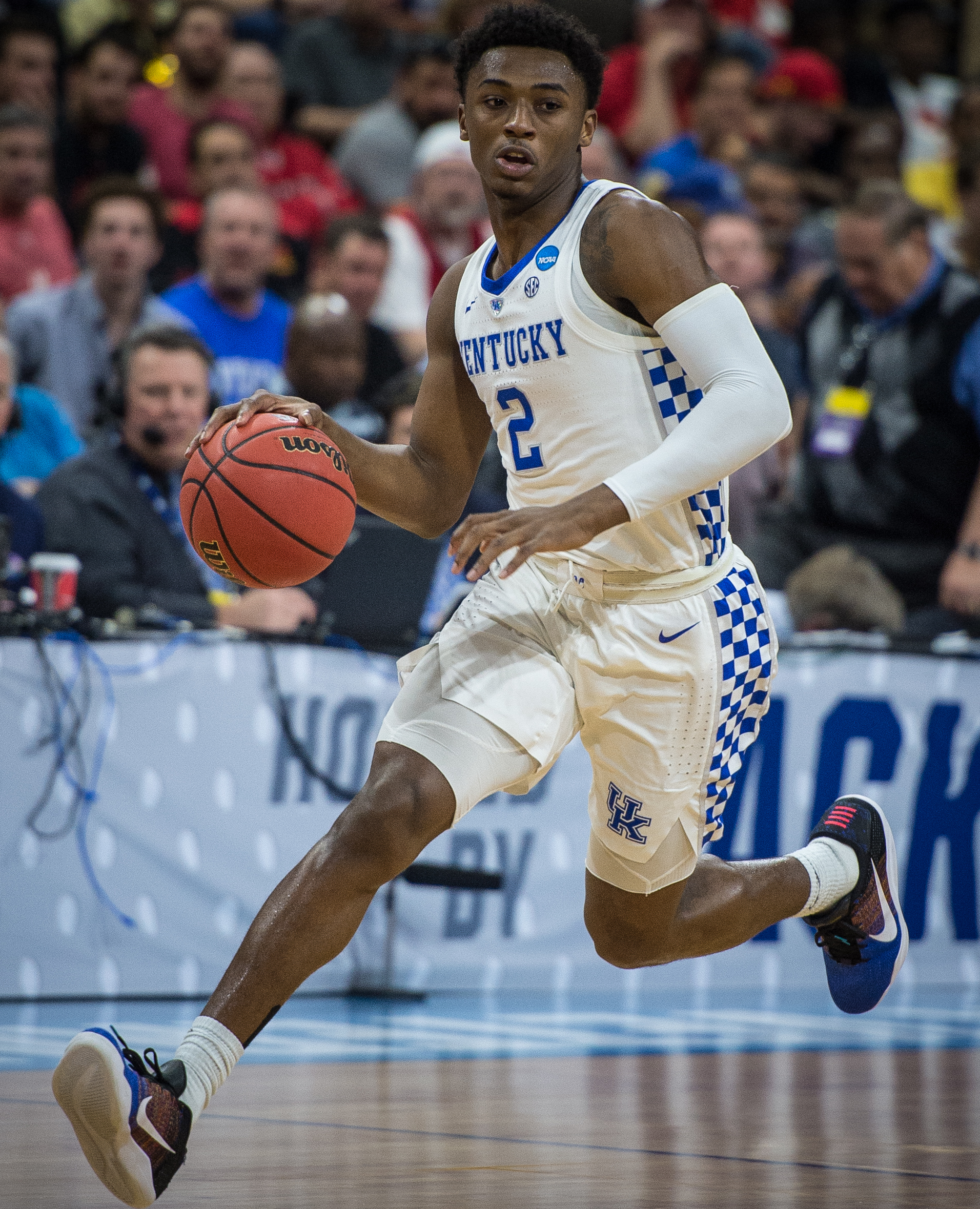
- Hagans with Kentucky in 2019

Free agent
- Position: Point guard

Personal information
- Born: July 8, 1999 (age 27) Cartersville, Georgia, U.S.
- Listed height: 6 ft 3 in (191 cm)
- Listed weight: 192 lb (87 kg)

Career information
- High school: Newton (Covington, Georgia)
- College: Kentucky (2018–2020)
- NBA draft: 2020: undrafted
- Playing career: 2020–present

Career history
- 2020–2021: Minnesota Timberwolves
- 2021–2022: Raptors 905
- 2022: Fort Wayne Mad Ants
- 2022–2023: Greensboro Swarm
- 2023–2024: Rip City Remix
- 2024: Portland Trail Blazers
- 2024: →Rip City Remix
- 2024–2025: Xinjiang Flying Tigers
- 2025–2026: Rip City Remix

Career highlights
- NBA G League Next Up Game (2024); SEC Co-Defensive Player of the Year (2019); SEC All-Defensive Team (2020); Mr. Georgia Basketball (2018)
- Stats at NBA.com
- Stats at Basketball Reference

Ashton Dewayne Hagans (born July 8, 1999) is an American professional basketball player for the Rip City Remix of the NBA G League. He played college basketball for the Kentucky Wildcats.

== High school career ==
Hagans attended Newton High School in Covington, Georgia where he averaged 20.2 points, 10.7 assists, 7.6 rebounds and 3.6 steals per game as a junior. He earned Mr. Basketball in Georgia as well as the Gatorade Georgia Player of the Year honors.

=== Recruiting ===
Hagans originally committed to Georgia on December 27, 2017. Hagans later decommitted from Georgia on February 26, 2018. On April 10, 2018, Hagans committed to play for Kentucky.

On June 15, 2018, Hagans reclassified to the 2018 class, allowing him to enroll at Kentucky.

College recruiting
Name	Hometown	School	Height	Weight	Commit date
Ashton Hagans; PG	Cartersville, GA	Newton (GA)	6 ft 3 in (1.91 m)	175 lb (79 kg)	Apr 10, 2018
Ashton Hagans; PG	Recruit ratings: Rivals: 247Sports: ESPN: (92)				
Overall recruit ranking: Rivals: 13 247Sports: 12 ESPN: 20
Note: In many cases, Scout, Rivals, 247Sports, On3, and ESPN may conflict in their listings of height and weight.; In these cases, the average was taken. ESPN grades are on a 100-point scale.; Sources: "Kentucky 2018 Basketball Commitments". Rivals.; "2018 Kentucky Wildcats Recruiting Class". ESPN.; "2018 Team Ranking". Rivals.

== College career ==
Hagans made his preseason debut for Kentucky on August 8, 2018, in an 85–61 win over the Bahamas National Team, scoring 6 points, collecting 5 rebounds, and 3 steals. On January 15, 2018, he scored 23 points in a 69–49 win over his former committed team, the Georgia Bulldogs. Hagans started the final 29 games of his freshman season and averaged 7.7 points, 4.3 assists, 2.6 rebounds and 1.6 steals per game. His 61 steals was the third highest by a freshman in program history behind John Wall (66) and Rajon Rondo (87). He was named SEC Co-Defensive Player of the Year.

Hagans suffered an ankle injury in a 71–59 win over Missouri on January 4, 2020. He missed a game against Florida on March 7 for personal reasons. At the conclusion of the regular season, Hagans was named to the SEC All-Defensive Team. He averaged 11.5 points, 3.9 rebounds, 6.4 assists and 1.9 steals per game. Following the season, Hagans declared for the 2020 NBA draft.

== Professional career ==
=== Minnesota Timberwolves (2020–2021) ===
After going undrafted in the 2020 NBA draft, Hagans signed a two-way contract with the Minnesota Timberwolves. Hagans played two minutes in two games without recording any statistics. On February 13, 2021, the Minnesota Timberwolves waived Hagans for violating NBA G League COVID protocols.

=== Raptors 905 (2021–2022) ===
Hagans was expected to join the Toronto Raptors in 2021 NBA Summer League but was injured. He was signed by the Raptors on October 16, 2021, but was waived to join the Raptors 905.

=== Fort Wayne Mad Ants / Greensboro Swarm (2022–2023) ===
On November 18, 2022, Hagans signed with the Fort Wayne Mad Ants after David Stockton entered health & safety protocols. He was waived 4 days later after appearing in 1 game. He then signed with the Greensboro Swarm, and in his first game with the team, posted a triple-double that included 22 assists, tied for the second-most in G League history.

=== Portland Trail Blazers / Rip City Remix (2023–2024) ===
On October 1, 2023, Hagans signed with the Portland Trail Blazers, but was waived the same day. On October 30, he joined the Rip City Remix.

On February 8, 2024, Hagans signed a 10-day contract with the Portland Trail Blazers and on February 18, he returned to the Remix. On February 23, he signed a two-way contract with the Trail Blazers.

=== Xinjiang Flying Tigers (2024–2025) ===
On September 27, 2024, Hagans signed with the Xinjiang Flying Tigers of the Chinese Basketball Association (CBA).

On August 13, 2025, Hagans signed with the Cairns Taipans of the National Basketball League (NBL) for the 2025–26 season. He was granted a release from his contract on September 15, prior to the start of the season, due to personal reasons.

=== Return to Rip City Remix (2025–2026) ===
For the 2025–26 season, Hagans was added to the roster of the Portland Trail Blazers' NBA G League affiliate, the Rip City Remix.

== Career statistics ==
Legend
GP	Games played	GS	Games started	MPG	Minutes per game
FG%	Field goal percentage	3P%	3-point field goal percentage	FT%	Free throw percentage
RPG	Rebounds per game	APG	Assists per game	SPG	Steals per game
BPG	Blocks per game	PPG	Points per game	**Bold**	Career high

=== NBA ===
==== Regular season ====
Year	Team	GP	GS	MPG	FG%	3P%	FT%	RPG	APG	SPG	BPG	PPG
2020–21	Minnesota	2	0	2.0	—	—	—	.0	.0	.0	.0	.0
2023–24	Portland	**19**	**1**	**16.6**	.408	.320	.824	**2.4**	**2.8**	**.6**	**.5**	**4.2**
Career		21	1	15.2	.408	.320	.824	2.1	2.6	.5	.4	3.8

=== College ===
Year	Team	GP	GS	MPG	FG%	3P%	FT%	RPG	APG	SPG	BPG	PPG
2018–19	Kentucky	**37**	**30**	28.5	**.467**	**.275**	.761	2.6	4.3	1.6	.1	7.7
2019–20	Kentucky	30	29	**33.1**	.404	.258	**.810**	**3.9**	**6.4**	**1.9**	**.2**	**11.5**
Career		67	59	30.6	.432	.265	.791	3.2	5.2	1.8	.1	9.4

== Personal life ==
Hagans is the cousin of former NFL running back Ronnie Brown and former NBA player Trey Thompkins.
