= 2024–25 Chinese Basketball Association season =

2024–25 CBA season
- League: Chinese Basketball Association
- Duration: 12 October 2024 – 31 March 2025 (Regular season); 4 April 2025 – 20 May 2025 (Playoffs)
- Number of teams: 20

Regular season
- Season MVP: Hu Jinqiu (Zhejiang L)

Playoffs
- Finals champions: Zhejiang Lions
- Runners-up: Beijing Ducks
- Finals MVP: Barry Brown Jr. (Zhejiang L)

Seasons
- ← 2023–24 2025–26 →

The 2024–25 CBA season was the 30th season of the Chinese Basketball Association (CBA). The season began on 12 October 2024 and ended on 20 May 2025. The CBA finals between the Zhejiang Lions and the Beijing Ducks started on 7 May, and ended on 20 May with the Lions winning their first league championship.

== Regular season ==
The regular season began on 12 October 2024 and ended on 31 March 2025.

Pos	Team	Pld	W	L	Pts	Qualification or relegation
1	Zhejiang Lions	46	39	7	85	Advance to playoffs quarter-finals
2	Shanxi Loongs	46	34	12	80	Advance to playoffs quarter-finals
3	Beijing Ducks	46	32	14	78	Advance to playoffs quarter-finals
4	Liaoning Flying Leopards	46	32	14	78	Advance to playoffs quarter-finals
5	Xinjiang Flying Tigers	46	32	14	78	Advance to playoffs first round
6	Shandong Hi-Speed Kirin	46	32	14	78	Advance to playoffs first round
7	Guangdong Southern Tigers	46	31	15	77	Advance to playoffs first round
8	Qingdao Eagles	46	31	15	77	Advance to playoffs first round
9	Zhejiang Golden Bulls	46	30	16	76	Advance to playoffs first round
10	Shanghai Sharks	46	28	18	74	Advance to playoffs first round
11	Beijing Royal Fighters	46	27	19	73	Advance to playoffs first round
12	Nanjing Monkey Kings	46	23	23	69	Advance to playoffs first round
13	Shenzhen Leopards	46	17	29	63	
14	Jilin Northeast Tigers	46	14	32	60	
15	Guangzhou Long Lions	46	12	34	58	
16	Tianjin Pioneers	46	12	34	58	
17	Ningbo Rockets	46	10	36	56	
18	Fujian Sturgeons	46	9	37	55	
19	Sichuan Blue Whales	46	9	37	55	
20	Jiangsu Dragons	46	6	40	52	

Source: CBA

== Playoffs ==
The playoffs began on 4 April 2025, and ended on 20 May 2025.

=== Bracket ===
First round Best-of-three
8	Qingdao Eagles	2
9	Zhejiang Golden Bulls	1
5	Xinjiang Flying Tigers	2
12	Nanjing Monkey Kings	0
7	Guangdong Southern Tigers	2
10	Shanghai Sharks	1
6	Shandong Hi-Speed Kirin	0
11	Beijing Royal Fighters	2

Quarter-finals; Best-of-five
1	Zhejiang Lions	3
8	Qingdao Eagles	2
4	Liaoning Flying Leopards	3
5	Xinjiang Flying Tigers	0
2	Shanxi Loongs	3
7	Guangdong Southern Tigers	0
3	Beijing Ducks	3
11	Beijing Royal Fighters	1

Semi-finals; Best-of-five
1	Zhejiang Lions	3
4	Liaoning Flying Leopards	0
2	Shanxi Loongs	0
3	Beijing Ducks	3

Finals; Best-of-seven
1	Zhejiang Lions	4
3	Beijing Ducks	2

== Awards ==
Category	Player	Team(s)	Ref.
Most Valuable Player	Hu Jinqiu	Zhejiang Lions	
CBA International MVP	Kenneth Lofton Jr.	Shanghai Sharks	
Finals MVP	Barry Brown	Zhejiang Lions	
CBA Best Defender	Sun Minghui	Zhejiang Lions	
