= Zhejiang Lions =

- Nickname: Lions
- Leagues: CBA
- Founded: 2005; 21 years ago
- History: Zhejiang Guangsha Lions; 2005–present
- Arena: Hangzhou Gymnasium
- Capacity: 5,136
- Location: Hangzhou, Zhejiang, China
- Team colors: Gold, Black, White
- Head coach: Wang Bo
- Championships: 1 (2025)
Home	Away	Third

The Zhejiang Guangsha Lions (Chinese: 浙江广厦猛狮; pinyin: Zhèjiāng Guǎngshà Mengshi) are a Chinese professional basketball team based in Hangzhou, Zhejiang, which plays in the North Division of the Chinese Basketball Association. Guangsha is the name of the club's corporate sponsor, but to prevent confusion with the older Zhejiang Golden Bulls, many Chinese websites refer to the team as the Guangsha Lions. This is to avoid the issue of having two Zhejiang clubs on the same list when team names are shown in shortform, with Guangsha becoming the "geographical" designation, as Hangzhou seems to not be an option.

== Roster ==
Note: Flags indicate national team eligibility at FIBA-sanctioned events. Players may hold other non-FIBA nationalities not displayed.

Zhejiang Lions roster
Players
Coaches

Pos.	No.	Nat.	Name	Ht.	Wt.	Age
PG	1	(China)	Wang Xinrui	1.97 m (6 ft 6 in)	83 kg (183 lb)	23 – 6 June 2003
PG	2	(China)	Liu Yang	1.85 m (6 ft 1 in)	68 kg (150 lb)	19 – 22 February 2007
PG	4	(China)	Li Junzhu	1.85 m (6 ft 1 in)	70 kg (154 lb)	19 – 2 March 2007
PG	6	(China)	Hou Mengze	1.85 m (6 ft 1 in)	75 kg (165 lb)	19 – 23 December 2006
PG	8	(China)	Feng Yubo	1.92 m (6 ft 4 in)	75 kg (165 lb)	19 – 23 December 2006
SF	9	(China)	Cai Sulinsen	1.93 m (6 ft 4 in)	80 kg (176 lb)	20 – 24 January 2006
SF	10	(China)	Zhu Junlong	2.01 m (6 ft 7 in)	94 kg (207 lb)	27 – 13 July 1999
PG	11	(China)	Sun Jinyu	1.88 m (6 ft 2 in)	75 kg (165 lb)	19 – 16 January 2007
SF	12	(China)	Xu Junwei	2.05 m (6 ft 9 in)	85 kg (187 lb)	22 – 19 March 2004
G/F	13	(China)	Cui Xinquan	1.96 m (6 ft 5 in)	95 kg (209 lb)	20 – 7 February 2006
F/C	15	(China)	Zhao Jiayi	2.03 m (6 ft 8 in)	113 kg (249 lb)	24 – 25 August 2002
F/C	16	(China)	Li Jinxiao	2.07 m (6 ft 9 in)	100 kg (220 lb)	29 – 16 April 1997
G	17	(China)	Sun Minghui	1.86 m (6 ft 1 in)	79 kg (174 lb)	30 – 26 April 1996
F	18	(China)	Lian Yu	1.99 m (6 ft 6 in)	102 kg (225 lb)	20 – 21 March 2006
F/C	21	(China)	Hu Jinqiu	2.10 m (6 ft 11 in)	111 kg (245 lb)	29 – 24 September 1997
F/C	26	(China)	Wu Xiao	2.03 m (6 ft 8 in)	109 kg (240 lb)	27 – 2 June 1999
F	36	(China)	Zhang Jiacheng	2.03 m (6 ft 8 in)	95 kg (209 lb)	21 – 21 March 2005
G/F	44	(United States)	Dez Wells	1.93 m (6 ft 4 in)	98 kg (216 lb)	34 – 15 April 1992
F/C	56	(Cameroon)	Landry Nnoko	2.08 m (6 ft 10 in)	106 kg (234 lb)	32 – 9 April 1994
SG	59	(United States)	Rayjon Tucker	1.90 m (6 ft 3 in)	95 kg (209 lb)	29 – 24 September 1997

Head coach

- (China) Wang Bo

Assistant coach(es)

- (Greece) Nakis Mouratidis
- (Greece) Isidoros Koutsos

Legend

- (C) Team captain
- Injured

- Roster
Updated: 15 October 2026

== Notable players ==
Note: Flags indicate national team eligibility at FIBA-sanctioned events. Players may hold other non-FIBA nationalities not displayed.

Criteria

To appear in this section a player must have either:

- Set a club record or won an individual award while at the club
- Played at least one official international match for their national team at any time
- Played at least one official NBA match at any time.

- (Nigeria) Gabe Muoneke (2006–2007)
- (United States) Rodney White (2007–2010, 2012)
- (China) Jin Lipeng (2008–2010, 2011–2013)
- (United States) Kasib Powell (2008)
- (Taiwan) Lin Chih-chieh (2009–2019)
- (United States) Jelani McCoy (2009)
- (Puerto Rico) Peter John Ramos (2009–2013)
- (United States) Javaris Crittenton (2010)
- (United States) Tre Kelley (2010–2011)
- (United States) Rafer Alston (2011)
- (United States) Dwayne Jones (2011)
- (United States) Walker Russell Jr. (2011)
- (Taiwan) Wu Tai-hao (2011–2012)
- (United States) Wilson Chandler (2011–2012, 2020)
- (United States) Al Thornton (2012)
- (Panama) Gary Forbes (2012–2013)
- (United States) Jonathan Gibson (2013–2014)
- (France) Johan Petro (2013–2014)
- (United States) Chris Johnson (2013–2014)
- (China) Hu Jinqiu (2013–present)
- (United States) Jamaal Franklin (2014–2015)
- (United States) Eli Holman (2014–2017)
- (United States) Kevin Murphy (2015)
- (United States) Jeremy Pargo (2015–2016)
- (China) Sun Minghui (2015–present)
- (China) Zhao Yanhao (2015–present)
- (Greece) Ioannis Bourousis (2017–2018)
- (United States) Courtney Fortson (2017–2019)
- (United States) Cameron Oliver(2023–2024)
- (United States) Nathan Knight (2024–2025)
- (Serbia) Boban Marjanović (2025)
