= 2017–18 Lipscomb Bisons men's basketball team =

American college basketball season

2017–18 Lipscomb Bisons men's basketball

Atlantic Sun tournament champions

NCAA tournament, First Round
- Conference: Atlantic Sun Conference
- Record: 23–10 (10–4 A-Sun)
- Head coach: Casey Alexander (5th season)
- Assistant coaches: Roger Idstrom; Steve Drabyn; Sean Rutigliano
- Home arena: Allen Arena

2017–18 ASUN men's basketball standings
	Conf.				Overall
Team	W		L	PCT	W		L	PCT
Florida Gulf Coast	12	–	2	.857	23	–	12	.657
Lipscomb †	10	–	4	.714	23	–	10	.697
Jacksonville	8	–	6	.571	15	–	18	.455
NJIT	7	–	7	.500	14	–	16	.467
North Florida	7	–	7	.500	14	–	19	.424
Kennesaw State	6	–	8	.429	10	–	20	.333
Stetson	4	–	10	.286	12	–	20	.375
USC Upstate	2	–	12	.143	7	–	25	.219
† 2018 ASUN Tournament winner

The 2017–18 Lipscomb Bisons men's basketball team represented Lipscomb University during the 2017–18 NCAA Division I men's basketball season. The Bisons, led by fifth-year head coach Casey Alexander, played their home games at Allen Arena in Nashville, Tennessee as members of the Atlantic Sun Conference. They finished the season 23–10, 10–4 in ASUN play to finish in second place. They defeated Stetson, Jacksonville and Florida Gulf Coast to become champions of the ASUN tournament. They earned the ASUN's automatic bid to the NCAA tournament where they lost in the first round to North Carolina.

== Previous season ==
The Bisons finished the 2016–17 season 20–13, 11–3 in ASUN play to finish in second place. As the No. 2 seed in the ASUN tournament, they defeated NJIT in the quarterfinals to advance to the semifinals where they lost to North Florida. Despite having 20 wins, they did not participate in a postseason tournament.

== Offseason ==
=== Departures ===
Name	Number	Pos.	Height	Weight	Year	Hometown	Reason for departure
Josh Williams	2	G	6'5"	210	Senior	Nashville, TN	Graduated
Cam Miller	4	G	6'2"	175	Senior	Franklin, TN	Graduated
Kenny Bunton	25	F	6'6"	200	Freshman	Cleveland, TN	Transferred to Lee
Brett Wishton	43	F	6'11"	240	Senior	Concord, NC	Graduated

=== Incoming transfers ===
Name	Number	Pos.	Height	Weight	Year	Hometown	Previous School
Andrew Fleming	15	G	6'6"	205	Sophomore	Nashville, TN	Transferred from Chattanooga. Under NCAA transfer rules, Fleming will have to sit out for the 2017–18 season. Will have three years of remaining eligibility.

=== 2017 recruiting class ===
College recruiting
Name	Hometown	School	Height	Weight	Commit date
Ahsan Asadullah; C	Riverdale, GA	North Clayton High School	6 ft 8 in (2.03 m)	255 lb (116 kg)	Sep 26, 2016
Ahsan Asadullah; C	Recruit ratings: Scout: Rivals: (NR)				
Greg Jones; SG	Frisco, TX	Wakeland High School	6 ft 2 in (1.88 m)	155 lb (70 kg)	
Greg Jones; SG	Recruit ratings: Scout: Rivals: (NR)				
Overall recruit ranking:
Note: In many cases, Scout, Rivals, 247Sports, On3, and ESPN may conflict in their listings of height and weight.; In these cases, the average was taken. ESPN grades are on a 100-point scale.; Sources: "2017 Team Ranking". Rivals.

== Roster ==
2017–18 Lipscomb Bisons men's basketball team
Players
Coaches

Pos.	#	Name	Height	Weight	Year	Previous school	Hometown
F	0	Rob Marberry	6 ft 7 in (2.01 m)	215 lb (98 kg)	RS Jr	Franklin Road Academy; Western Kentucky	Nashville, TN
G	1	Greg Jones	6 ft 1 in (1.85 m)	175 lb (79 kg)	Fr	Wakeland HS	Frisco, TX
C	2	Ahsan Asadullah (injured) (redshirt)	6 ft 8 in (2.03 m)	260 lb (118 kg)	Fr	North Clayton HS	Atlanta, GA
G	3	Michael Buckland	6 ft 5 in (1.96 m)	190 lb (86 kg)	So	Wesleyan Christian Academy	High Point, NC
G	5	Nathan Moran	5 ft 10 in (1.78 m)	160 lb (73 kg)	Sr	Battle Ground Academy	Franklin, TN
G	11	Asa Duvall	6 ft 2 in (1.88 m)	195 lb (88 kg)	RS Sr	Hargrave Military Academy	Brentwood, TN
F	12	Matt Rose (W)	6 ft 7 in (2.01 m)	200 lb (91 kg)	RS So	Lexington Christian Academy; Samford	Lexington, KY
G	13	Zach Flener (W)	5 ft 10 in (1.78 m)	170 lb (77 kg)	Fr	Murray HS	Murray, KY
G	15	Andrew Fleming (redshirt)	6 ft 6 in (1.98 m)	205 lb (93 kg)	So	Oak Hill Academy; Chattanooga	Nashville, TN
G	20	John Matt Merritt (W)	6 ft 0 in (1.83 m)	155 lb (70 kg)	RS Fr	Lipscomb Academy	Nashville, TN
G	21	Kenny Cooper	6 ft 0 in (1.83 m)	180 lb (82 kg)	So	Franklin Road Academy	Nashville, TN
F	22	Eli Pepper	6 ft 9 in (2.06 m)	205 lb (93 kg)	Jr	Caldwell County High School	Princeton, KY
G	23	Aaron Korn	6 ft 4 in (1.93 m)	210 lb (95 kg)	Sr	Frankton Junior-Senior HS	Frankton, IN
G	24	Garrison Mathews	6 ft 5 in (1.96 m)	210 lb (95 kg)	Jr	Franklin HS	Franklin, TN
C	55	George Brammeier	6 ft 10 in (2.08 m)	235 lb (107 kg)	Sr	Bloomingdale HS	Brandon, FL

Head coach

- Casey Alexander (Belmont)

Assistant coach(es)

- Roger Idstrom (Mars Hill College)
- Steve Drabyn (Belmont)
- Sean Rutigliano (Cortland State)

Legend

- (C) Team captain
- (S) Suspended
- (I) Ineligible
- (W) Walk-on
- Injured
- Current redshirt

Roster

== Schedule and results ==
Date time, TV	Rank^{#}	Opponent^{#}	Result	Record	High points	High rebounds	High assists	Site (attendance) city, state
Non-conference regular season
Nov 10, 2017*; 6:30 pm, ESPN3		Emory	W 98–83	1–0	37 – Mathews	10 – Marberry	8 – Buckland	Allen Arena (1,168); Nashville, TN
Nov 12, 2017*; 4:00 pm, ESPN3		Morehead State	W 77–70	2–0	25 – Mathews	13 – Marberry	6 – Buckland	Allen Arena (561); Nashville, TN
Nov 14, 2017*; 7:00 pm, SECN		at Alabama	L 64–86	2–1	15 – Tied	7 – Marberry	2 – Tied	Coleman Coliseum (12,325); Tuscaloosa, AL
Nov 18, 2017*; 5:00 pm, LHN		at Texas	L 57–80	2–2	17 – Mathews	7 – Buckland	1 – Tied	Frank Erwin Center (8,592); Austin, TX
Nov 20, 2017*; 7:00 pm		at Abilene Christian	W 75–67	3–2	17 – Marberry	13 – Pepper	4 – Cooper	Moody Coliseum (1,187); Abilene, TX
Nov 27, 2017*; 6:30 pm, OVCDN		at Belmont; Battle of the Boulevard	W 74–66	4–2	22 – Mathews	8 – Tied	6 – Cooper	Curb Event Center (2,754); Nashville, TN
Nov 29, 2017*; 6:00 pm, OVCDN		at Tennessee Tech	L 80–86	4–3	18 – Mathews	6 – Tied	4 – Cooper	Eblen Center (1,327); Cookeville, TN
Dec 2, 2017*; 7:00 pm, OVCDN		at Tennessee State	W 95–86 ^{OT}	5–3	20 – Buckland	7 – Marberry	5 – Marberry	Gentry Complex (1,201); Nashville, TN
Dec 4, 2017*; 7:15 pm, ESPN3		Belmont; Battle of the Boulevard	W 69–54	6–3	26 – Mathews	9 – Marberry	5 – Marberry	Allen Arena (4,161); Nashville, TN
Dec 9, 2017*; 1:15 pm, SECN		at No. 24 Tennessee	L 71–81	6–4	22 – Mathews	15 – Pepper	7 – Cooper	Thompson–Boling Arena (14,051); Knoxville, TN
Dec 14, 2017*; 6:30 pm, ESPN3		Florida College	W 100–68	7–4	21 – Mathews	10 – Pepper	6 – Pepper	Allen Arena (1,007); Nashville, TN
Dec 17, 2017*; 1:00 pm, ESPN3		Abilene Christian	W 67–65	8–4	24 – Marberry	14 – Pepper	4 – Tied	Allen Arena (1,205); Nashville, TN
Dec 21, 2017*; 6:00 pm		at Navy	W 73–64	9–4	27 – Mathews	5 – Pepper	6 – Cooper	Alumni Hall (972); Annapolis, MD
Dec 30, 2017*; 7:00 pm, BTN		at No. 14 Purdue	L 66–98	9–5	25 – Mathews	6 – Korn	5 – Cooper	Mackey Arena (14,804); West Lafayette, IN
Jan 3, 2018*; 6:30 pm, ESPN3		Fisk	W 99–53	10–5	28 – Mathews	13 – Pepper	6 – Cooper	Allen Arena (778); Nashville, TN
Atlantic Sun Conference regular season
Jan 6, 2018; 3:30 pm, ESPN3		at Kennesaw State	W 86–71	11–5 (1–0)	43 – Mathews	13 – Mathews	5 – Buckland	KSU Convocation Center (1,075); Kennesaw, GA
Jan 11, 2018; 6:00 pm, ESPN3		at North Florida	L 96–102	11–6 (1–1)	32 – Mathews	12 – Mathews	5 – Cooper	UNF Arena (1,481); Jacksonville, FL
Jan 13, 2018; 5:00 pm, ESPN3		at Jacksonville	L 69–87	11–7 (1–2)	23 – Mathews	7 – Tied	3 – Pepper	Swisher Gymnasium (987); Jacksonville, FL
Jan 18, 2018; 6:30 pm, ESPN3		Florida Gulf Coast	L 83–88	11–8 (1–3)	15 – Tied	7 – Mathews	5 – Marberry	Allen Arena (1,147); Nashville, TN
Jan 20, 2018; 4:00 pm, ESPN3		Stetson	W 85–82	12–8 (2–3)	20 – Tied	14 – Pepper	8 – Cooper	Allen Arena (1,644); Nashville, TN
Jan 24, 2018; 6:30 pm, ESPN3		USC Upstate	W 92–78	13–8 (3–3)	24 – Marberry	11 – Mathews	4 – Tied	Allen Arena (1,007); Nashville, TN
Jan 27, 2018; 3:00 pm, ESPN3		at NJIT	W 86–79 ^{OT}	14–8 (4–3)	29 – Marberry	11 – Pepper	5 – Pepper	Wellness and Events Center (662); Newark, NJ
Jan 29, 2018; 6:00 pm, ESPN3		at USC Upstate	W 110–106 ^{2OT}	15–8 (5–3)	38 – Marberry	10 – Pepper	7 – Buckland	G. B. Hodge Center (837); Spartanburg, SC
Feb 3, 2018; 4:00 pm, ESPN3		NJIT	L 77–81	15–9 (5–4)	28 – Mathews	10 – Pepper	3 – Tied	Allen Arena (1,650); Nashville, TN
Feb 8, 2018; 6:30 pm, ESPN3		Jacksonville	W 82–59	16–9 (6–4)	23 – Mathews	15 – Pepper	3 – Rose	Allen Arena (1,406); Nashville, TN
Feb 10, 2018; 4:00 pm, ESPN3		North Florida	W 82–75	17–9 (7–4)	39 – Marberry	6 – Tied	6 – Tied	Allen Arena (1,692); Nashville, TN
Feb 15, 2018; 7:00 pm, ESPN3		at Stetson	W 82–73	18–9 (8–4)	17 – Mathews	9 – Korn	3 – Tied	Edmunds Center (412); DeLand, FL
Feb 17, 2018; 6:00 pm, ESPN3		at Florida Gulf Coast	W 90–87	19–9 (9–4)	23 – Mathews	7 – Pepper	4 – Pepper	Alico Arena (4,497); Fort Myers, FL
Feb 22, 2018; 6:30 pm, ESPN3		Kennesaw State	W 83–74	20–9 (10–4)	32 – Marberry	11 – Marberry	9 – Cooper	Allen Arena (1,150); Nashville, TN
Atlantic Sun tournament
Feb 26, 2018; 7:00 pm, ESPN3	(2)	(7) Stetson; Quarterfinals	W 89–73	21–9	29 – Mathews	9 – Marberry	5 – Mathews	Allen Arena (1,877); Nashville, TN
Mar 1, 2018; 7:00 pm, ESPN3	(2)	(3) Jacksonville; Semifinals	W 77–62	22–9	23 – Mathews	8 – Pepper	4 – Tied	Allen Arena (1,967); Nashville, TN
Mar 4, 2018; 2:00 pm, ESPN	(2)	at (1) Florida Gulf Coast; Championship	W 108–96	23–9	33 – Mathews	9 – Mathews	9 – Cooper	Alico Arena (4,633); Fort Myers, FL
NCAA tournament
Mar 16, 2018*; 1:45 pm, CBS	(15 W)	vs. (2 W) No. 10 North Carolina; First Round	L 66–84	23–10	14 – Cooper	7 – Tied	4 – Tied	Spectrum Center (18,489); Charlotte, NC
*Non-conference game. ^{#}Rankings from AP poll. (#) Tournament seedings in parentheses. W=West Source. All times are in Central Time.
