= 2017–18 Jacksonville Dolphins men's basketball team =

American college basketball season

2017–18 Jacksonville Dolphins men's basketball
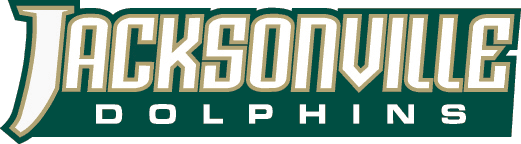
- Conference: Atlantic Sun Conference
- Record: 15–18 (8–6 ASUN)
- Head coach: Tony Jasick (4th season)
- Assistant coaches: Dan Bere'; Chad Eshbaugh; Azeez Ali
- Home arena: Swisher Gymnasium

2017–18 ASUN men's basketball standings
	Conf.				Overall
Team	W		L	PCT	W		L	PCT
Florida Gulf Coast	12	–	2	.857	23	–	12	.657
Lipscomb †	10	–	4	.714	23	–	10	.697
Jacksonville	8	–	6	.571	15	–	18	.455
NJIT	7	–	7	.500	14	–	16	.467
North Florida	7	–	7	.500	14	–	19	.424
Kennesaw State	6	–	8	.429	10	–	20	.333
Stetson	4	–	10	.286	12	–	20	.375
USC Upstate	2	–	12	.143	7	–	25	.219
† 2018 ASUN Tournament winner

The 2017–18 Jacksonville Dolphins men's basketball team represented Jacksonville University during the 2017–18 NCAA Division I men's basketball season. The Dolphins, led by fourth-year head coach Tony Jasick played their home games at Swisher Gymnasium on the university's Jacksonville, Florida campus as members of the Atlantic Sun Conference. They finished the season 15–18, 8–6 in ASUN play to finish in third place. They defeated Kennesaw State in the quarterfinals of the ASUN tournament before losing in the semifinals to Lipscomb.

== Previous season ==
The Dolphins finished the 2016–17 season 17–16, 5–9 in ASUN play to finish in sixth place. They lost in the quarterfinals of the ASUN tournament to North Florida. They were invited to the CollegeInsider.com Tournament where they lost in the first round to Saint Francis (PA).

== Offseason ==
=== Departures ===
Name	Number	Pos.	Height	Weight	Year	Hometown	Reason for departure
Darius Dawkins	5	F	6'7"	200	RS Senior	McLeansville, NC	Graduated
Darien Fernandez	10	G	5'8"	185	Senior	Onset, MA	Graduated
Omar El Manasterly	11	F	6'6"	220	Senior	Alexandria, Egypt	Graduated
Marcel White	13	F	6'6"	220	Senior	Lake Wales, FL	Graduated
J. R. Holder	15	F	6'7"	180	Senior	Atlanta, GA	Graduated
Jordan Martin	20	G	6'2"	150	Freshman	Boca Raton, FL	Walk-on; didn't return
Tyrone Sam	21	G	6'4"	195	Junior	Roswell, GA	Graduate transferred to Valdosta State
Andris Misters	22	G	6'5"	200	Senior	Jelgava, Latvia	Graduated
Demontrez Austin	34	F	6'7"	210	Senior	Guyton, GA	Graduated

=== Incoming transfers ===
Name	Number	Pos.	Height	Weight	Year	Hometown	Previous School
Aamahne Santos	10	G	5'10"	175	Junior	Dorchester, MA	Junior college transferred from Cloud County CC.
Qinton Forrest	15	G	6'5"	210	Junior	Windermere, FL	Transferred from Bethune–Cookman. Under NCAA transfer rules, Forrest will have to sit out for the 2017–18 season. Will have two years of remaining eligibility. Will join the team as a preferred walk-on.
Radwan Bakkali	22	C	6'10"	245	Junior	London, England	Junior college transferred from Kilgore College
David Bell	23	C	6'9"	225	RS Junior	Cleveland, OH	Transferred from Ohio State. Under NCAA transfer rules, Bell will have to sit out for the 2017–18 season. Will have two years of remaining eligibility.
Josh Wallace		G	6'3"	185	Junior	Flushing, NY	Junior college transferred from Palm Beach State College.

=== 2017 recruiting class ===
College recruiting information
Name	Hometown	School	Height	Weight	Commit date
Jalyn Hinton #116 SF	Roxbury, MA	Governor's Academy	6 ft 4 in (1.93 m)	180 lb (82 kg)	Oct 19, 2016
Jalyn Hinton #116 SF	Recruit ratings: Scout: Rivals: (55)				
JD Notae; SG	Covington, GA	Newton High School	6 ft 2 in (1.88 m)	190 lb (86 kg)	Oct 29, 2016
JD Notae; SG	Recruit ratings: Scout: Rivals: (NR)				
Corey Romich; SG	Groton, MA	Vermont Academy	6 ft 4 in (1.93 m)	195 lb (88 kg)	Nov 2, 2016
Corey Romich; SG	Recruit ratings: Scout: Rivals: (NR)				
Overall recruit ranking:
Note: In many cases, Scout, Rivals, 247Sports, On3, and ESPN may conflict in their listings of height and weight.; In these cases, the average was taken. ESPN grades are on a 100-point scale.; Sources: "2017 Team Ranking". Rivals.

== Roster ==
2017–18 Jacksonville Dolphins men's basketball team
Players
Coaches

Pos.	#	Name	Height	Weight	Year	Previous school	Hometown
G	0	Tanner Rubio	6 ft 0 in (1.83 m)	170 lb (77 kg)	So	The Master's Academy	Maitland, FL
G	1	JD Notae	6 ft 2 in (1.88 m)	180 lb (82 kg)	Fr	Newton	Covington, GA
G	2	Corey Romich	6 ft 4 in (1.93 m)	205 lb (93 kg)	Fr	Vermont Academy	Groton, MA
G	3	Devin Harris	6 ft 4 in (1.93 m)	200 lb (91 kg)	RS Sr	Jesuit HS; East Tennessee St.	Tampa, FL
F	5	Damien Sears	6 ft 7 in (2.01 m)	230 lb (104 kg)	RS Fr	Haughton HS	Haughton, LA
G	11	Jalyn Hinton	6 ft 5 in (1.96 m)	195 lb (88 kg)	Fr	Governor's Academy	Boston, MA
F	14	Jace Hogan	6 ft 6 in (1.98 m)	225 lb (102 kg)	RS Jr	Holy Trinity Episcopal Academy; Navy	Melbourne, FL
G	15	Quinton Forrest (W) (redshirt)	6 ft 4 in (1.93 m)	220 lb (100 kg)	Jr	West Orange HS; Bethune–Cookman	Windermere, FL
G	20	Lee Richmond (W)	6 ft 1 in (1.85 m)	160 lb (73 kg)	So	Christian Brothers HS	St. Louis, MO
G/F	21	Derrick Flowers	6 ft 3 in (1.91 m)	195 lb (88 kg)	Fr	Prestonwood Christian Academy-Plano	Frisco, TX
F/C	22	Radwan Bakkali	6 ft 10 in (2.08 m)	250 lb (113 kg)	Jr	Barking Abbey School; Kilgore College	London, England
C	23	David Bell (I)	6 ft 9 in (2.06 m)	215 lb (98 kg)	RS Jr	Garfield Heights HS; Ohio State	Cleveland, OH
F	25	Antwon Clayton	6 ft 6 in (1.98 m)	200 lb (91 kg)	Sr	Eustis HS	Eustis, FL
F	33	Cody Helgeland	6 ft 8 in (2.03 m)	185 lb (84 kg)	RS Sr	Stephens County HS; South Georgia St.	Toccoa, GA

Head coach

- Tony Jasick (Mars Hill College)

Assistant coach(es)

- Dan Bere' (Indiana)
- Chad Eshbaugh (Washburn)
- Azeez Ali (Maryland Eastern Shore)

Legend

- (C) Team captain
- (S) Suspended
- (I) Ineligible
- (W) Walk-on
- Injured
- Current redshirt

Roster

== Schedule and results ==
Date time, TV	Rank^{#}	Opponent^{#}	Result	Record	High points	High rebounds	High assists	Site (attendance) city, state
Exhibition
Nov 2, 2017*; 7:00 pm		No. 8 Florida; Fundraiser for Florida's First Coast Relief Fund	L 47–88		–	–	–	Swisher Gymnasium (1,542); Jacksonville, FL
Non-conference regular season
Nov 10, 2017*; 8:00 pm		at UAB	L 67–96	0–1	18 – Notae	6 – Helgeland	5 – Harris	Bartow Arena (3,106); Birmingham, AL
Nov 12, 2017*; 12:00 pm, FSN		at Georgetown	L 57–73	0–2	18 – Notae	8 – Harris	7 – Harris	Capital One Arena (9,212); Washington, D.C.
Nov 18, 2017*; 6:00 pm, ESPN3		North Carolina A&T	L 82–90 ^{OT}	0–3	24 – Hogan	11 – Hogan	3 – Rubio	Swisher Gymnasium (752); Jacksonville, FL
Nov 20, 2017*; 7:00 pm, ESPN3		Webber International	W 88–70	1–3	23 – Harris	11 – Harris	5 – Harris	Swisher Gymnasium (492); Jacksonville, FL
Nov 24, 2017*; 4:30 pm, ESPN3		vs. Fairfield; Wright State Tournament	W 92–84	2–3	24 – Harris	10 – Harris	5 – Harris	Nutter Center (3,456); Fairborn, OH
Nov 25, 2017*; 5:00 pm, ESPN3		at Wright State; Wright State Tournament	L 44–68	2–4	10 – Tied	6 – Harris	7 – Harris	Nutter Center (3,030); Fairborn, OH
Nov 26, 2017*; 1:00 pm, ESPN3		vs. Gardner–Webb; Wright State Tournament	W 106–99 ^{3OT}	3–4	29 – Hogan	10 – Tied	8 – Harris	Nutter Center (3,045); Fairborn, OH
Nov 30, 2017*; 7:30 pm, ESPN3		at Bethune–Cookman	L 66–77	3–5	24 – Notae	12 – Tied	6 – Harris	Swisher Gymnasium (878); Jacksonville, FL
Dec 2, 2017*; 6:00 pm		at Eastern Kentucky	L 65–70 ^{OT}	3–6	20 – Hogan	12 – Harris	4 – Harris	McBrayer Arena (1,310); Richmond, KY
Dec 5, 2017*; 7:00 pm, ESPN3		Milwaukee	L 52–62	3–7	15 – Notae	10 – Harris	5 – Harris	Swisher Gymnasium (619); Jacksonville, FL
Dec 9, 2017*; 6:00 pm, ESPN3		Florida National	W 89–51	4–7	18 – Helgeland	10 – Notae	6 – Notae	Swisher Gymnasium (723); Jacksonville, FL
Dec 16, 2017*; 4:00 pm		at South Carolina State	L 74–83	4–8	24 – Hogan	10 – Hogan	3 – Notae	SHM Memorial Center; Orangeburg, SC
Dec 20, 2017*; 7:00 pm, ESPN3		Northern Arizona	L 72–83	4–9	18 – Hinton	7 – Tied	6 – Notae	Swisher Gymnasium (603); Jacksonville, FL
Dec 22, 2017*; 7:00 pm, RSN		at NC State	L 64–116	4–10	19 – Notae	10 – Sears	4 – Notae	PNC Arena (14,899); Raleigh, NC
Dec 28, 2017*; 7:00 pm, ESPN3		Middle Georgia State	W 81–60	5–10	30 – Notae	14 – Hinton	3 – Tied	Swisher Gymnasium (457); Jacksonville, FL
Dec 30, 2017*; 6:00 pm, BTN		at Michigan	L 51–76	5–11	22 – Notae	8 – Notae	4 – Harris	Crisler Arena (12,707); Ann Arbor, MI
Jan 2, 2018*; 7:00 pm, ESPN3		Trinity Baptist	W 105–48	6–11	20 – Helgeland	10 – Hinton	5 – Rubio	Swisher Gymnasium (598); Jacksonville, FL
Atlantic Sun Conference regular season
Jan 6, 2018; 7:00 pm, ESPN3		at North Florida	W 90–86	7–11 (1–0)	25 – Notae	11 – Hogan	6 – Harris	UNF Arena (2,788); Jacksonville, FL
Jan 11, 2018; 7:00 pm, ESPN3		Kennesaw State	W 65–58	8–11 (2–0)	14 – Tied	8 – Tied	8 – Harris	Swisher Gymnasium (947); Jacksonville, FL
Jan 13, 2018; 6:00 pm, ESPN3		Lipscomb	W 87–69	9–11 (3–0)	21 – Notae	9 – Harris	7 – Harris	Swisher Gymnasium (987); Jacksonville, FL
Jan 18, 2018; 6:00 pm, ESPN3		at USC Upstate	L 85–91	9–12 (3–1)	19 – Hogan	8 – Hogan	7 – Harris	G. B. Hodge Center (833); Spartanburg, SC
Jan 20, 2018; 4:00 pm, ESPN3		at NJIT	W 63–61	10–12 (4–1)	12 – Hogan	11 – Harris	6 – Harris	Wellness and Events Center (692); Newark, NJ
Jan 24, 2018; 4:00 pm, ESPN3		Stetson	W 76–69	11–12 (5–1)	21 – Tied	9 – Harris	4 – Clayton	Swisher Gymnasium (832); Jacksonville, FL
Jan 27, 2018; 7:00 pm, ESPN3		at Florida Gulf Coast	L 62–68	11–13 (5–2)	23 – Hogan	8 – Harris	7 – Harris	Alico Arena (4,427); Fort Myers, FL
Jan 29, 2018; 4:00 pm, ESPN3		at Stetson	W 68–67	12–13 (6–2)	20 – Notae	10 – Harris	7 – Harris	Edmunds Center (748); DeLand, FL
Feb 3, 2018; 6:00 pm, ESPN3		Florida Gulf Coast	L 55–80	12–14 (6–3)	17 – Hogan	8 – Hinton	2 – Tied	Swisher Gymnasium (1,283); Jacksonville, FL
Feb 8, 2018; 7:30 pm, ESPN3		at Lipscomb	L 59–82	12–15 (6–4)	13 – Notae	5 – Hinton	2 – Rubio	Allen Arena (1,406); Nashville, TN
Feb 10, 2018; 4:30 pm, ESPN3		at Kennesaw State	L 54–78	12–16 (6–5)	14 – Hogan	11 – Hogan	3 – Notae	KSU Convocation Center (1,391); Kennesaw, GA
Feb 15, 2018; 7:00 pm, ESPN3		NJIT	L 69–71	12–17 (6–6)	20 – Hogan	11 – Clayton	7 – Harris	Swisher Gymnasium (827); Jacksonville, FL
Feb 17, 2018; 6:00 pm, ESPN3		USC Upstate	W 82–70	13–17 (7–6)	21 – Harris	11 – Harris	5 – Tied	Swisher Gymnasium (889); Jacksonville, FL
Feb 22, 2018; 7:00 pm, ESPN3		North Florida	W 86–81	14–17 (8–6)	26 – Hogan	12 – Harris	16 – Harris	Swisher Gymnasium (1,360); Jacksonville, FL
Atlantic Sun tournament
Feb 26, 2018; 7:00 pm, ESPN3	(3)	(6) Kennesaw State; Quarterfinals	W 87–68	15–17	39 – Hogan	11 – Harris	9 – Harris	Swisher Gymnasium (725); Jacksonville, FL
Mar 1, 2018; 8:00 pm, ESPN3	(3)	at (2) Lipscomb; Semifinals	L 62–77	15–18	24 – Helgeland	11 – Harris	5 – Harris	Allen Arena (1,967); Nashville, TN
*Non-conference game. ^{#}Rankings from AP Poll. (#) Tournament seedings in parentheses. All times are in Eastern Time.
