= Tristan Jarrett =

American basketball player (born 1998)

Personal information
- Born: August 6, 1998 (age 28)
- Listed height: 6 ft 4 in (1.93 m)
- Listed weight: 195 lb (88 kg)

Career information
- High school: Haywood (Brownsville, Tennessee)
- College: Kennesaw State (2017–2018); Three Rivers (2018–2019); Jackson State (2019–2021)
- NBA draft: 2021: undrafted
- Playing career: 2021–present
- Position: Shooting guard

Career highlights
- SWAC Player of the Year (2021); First-team All-SWAC (2021); Second-team All-SWAC (2020)

Tristan Jarrett (born August 6, 1998) is an American professional basketball player. He played college basketball for the Kennesaw State Owls, the Three Rivers Raiders, and the Jackson State Tigers.

== High school career ==
Jarrett attended Haywood High School in Brownsville, Tennessee. As a senior, he averaged 21.8 points and 8.6 rebounds per game, leading his team to a Region 8-AA championship. Jarrett was named All-West Tennessee Player of the Year by The Jackson Sun. He committed to playing college basketball for Kennesaw State over scholarship offers from Middle Tennessee, Little Rock and Tennessee State. He was considered a three-star recruit by ESPN.

== College career ==
Jarrett averaged 4.8 points through 12 games at Kennesaw State before leaving the program. He moved to Three Rivers College, where he averaged 29 points as a sophomore and led his team in five statistical categories. He was dismissed from the program for violating team rules. For his junior season, Jarrett transferred to Jackson State. As a junior, he averaged 16.8 points and 3.4 rebounds per game, earning Second Team All-Southwestern Athletic Conference (SWAC) recognition. During a game against Southern on February 8, 2021, Jarrett walked off the court and threw his jersey on his way to the locker room after an argument with teammate Jayveous McKinnis.

At the close of the regular season, Jarrett was named SWAC Player of the Year. He averaged 21.1 points, 5.3 rebounds, and 1.4 steals per game. Following the season, Jarrett declared for the 2021 NBA draft.

== Professional career ==
Jarrett was drafted with the 7th pick in the third round of the 2021 NBA G League Draft by the Raptors 905. He was waived before the season. He most recently played for Piratas de Bogota of Liga WPlay de Baloncesto.

== Career statistics ==
Legend
GP	Games played	GS	Games started	MPG	Minutes per game
FG%	Field goal percentage	3P%	3-point field goal percentage	FT%	Free throw percentage
RPG	Rebounds per game	APG	Assists per game	SPG	Steals per game
BPG	Blocks per game	PPG	Points per game	**Bold**	Career high

=== College ===
Year	Team	GP	GS	MPG	FG%	3P%	FT%	RPG	APG	SPG	BPG	PPG
2017–18	Kennesaw State	12	0	12.4	.304	.233	.615	2.3	.7	.3	.3	4.8
2019–20	Jackson State	**32**	**25**	27.9	.390	.269	.699	3.4	**1.9**	1.3	**.5**	16.8
2020–21	Jackson State	18	16	**31.8**	**.420**	**.358**	**.842**	**5.3**	1.4	**1.4**	.4	**21.1**
Career		62	41	26.1	.393	.298	.755	3.7	1.5	1.2	.4	15.7
