= 2017–18 Kennesaw State Owls men's basketball team =

American college basketball season

2017–18 Kennesaw State Owls men's basketball
- Conference: Atlantic Sun Conference
- Record: 10–20 (6–8 ASUN)
- Head coach: Al Skinner (3rd season)
- Assistant coaches: Michael Cotton; Carlton Owens; Stephen Cox
- Home arena: KSU Convocation Center

2017–18 ASUN men's basketball standings
	Conf.				Overall
Team	W		L	PCT	W		L	PCT
Florida Gulf Coast	12	–	2	.857	23	–	12	.657
Lipscomb †	10	–	4	.714	23	–	10	.697
Jacksonville	8	–	6	.571	15	–	18	.455
NJIT	7	–	7	.500	14	–	16	.467
North Florida	7	–	7	.500	14	–	19	.424
Kennesaw State	6	–	8	.429	10	–	20	.333
Stetson	4	–	10	.286	12	–	20	.375
USC Upstate	2	–	12	.143	7	–	25	.219
† 2018 ASUN Tournament winner

The 2017–18 Kennesaw State Owls men's basketball team represented Kennesaw State University during the 2017–18 NCAA Division I men's basketball season. The Owls were led by third-year head coach Al Skinner and played their home games at the KSU Convocation Center on the university's campus in Kennesaw, Georgia as members of the Atlantic Sun Conference. They finished the season 10–20, 6–8 in ASUN play to finish in sixth place.

The Owls lost in the quarterfinals of the ASUN tournament to Jacksonville.

== Previous season ==
The Owls finished the 2016–17 season 14–18, 7–7 in ASUN play to finish in a tie for fourth place. As the No. 5 seed in the ASUN tournament, they defeated USC Upstate before losing to Florida Gulf Coast in the semifinals.

== Offseason ==
=== Departures ===
Name	Number	Pos.	Height	Weight	Year	Hometown	Reason for departure
Kendrick Ray	0	G	6'2"	188	RS Senior	Middletown, NY	Graduated
Johannes Nielsen	10	F	6'10"	210	Freshman	Virum, Denmark	Left the team for personal reasons
Aubrey Williams	14	F	6'7"	230	RS Senior	Bowie, MD	Graduated
Cameron Neysmith	15	G	6'4"	207	Senior	Norcross, GA	Graduated
Shazier Lawson	22	F	6'6"	220	Sophomore	Perry, GA	Transferred to Northwest Kansas Technical College
Josh Burnett	24	G	6'5"	182	Sophomore	Honolulu, HI	Graduate transferred to Shorter
Zach Cameron	35	F	6'10"	215	Freshman	Sacramento, CA	Transferred to Mineral Area College

=== Incoming transfers ===
Name	Number	Pos.	Height	Weight	Year	Hometown	Previous School
Arthur Gray	15	F	6'7"	220	RS Senior	Lawrenceville, GA	Transferred from North Greenville. Will be eligible to play immediately since Gray graduated from North Greenville. Will join the team as a preferred walk-on.
Bryson Lockley	21	F	6'7"	210	RS Sophomore	Houston, TX	Junior college transferred from Panola College

=== 2017 recruiting class ===
College recruiting information
Name	Hometown	School	Height	Weight	Commit date
Tristan Jarrett; SG	Brownsville, TN	Haywood High School	6 ft 4 in (1.93 m)	175 lb (79 kg)	
Tristan Jarrett; SG	Recruit ratings: Scout: Rivals: (NR)				
Overall recruit ranking:
Note: In many cases, Scout, Rivals, 247Sports, On3, and ESPN may conflict in their listings of height and weight.; In these cases, the average was taken. ESPN grades are on a 100-point scale.; Sources: "2017 Team Ranking". Rivals.

== Roster ==
2017–18 Kennesaw State Owls men's basketball team
Players
Coaches

Pos.	#	Name	Height	Weight	Year	Previous school	Hometown
F	1	Anthony Wilson	6 ft 5 in (1.96 m)	221 lb (100 kg)	So	Miami Central HS	Miami, FL
F	2	Jordan Jones	6 ft 8 in (2.03 m)	205 lb (93 kg)	RS Sr	St. Francis School	Alpharetta, GA
G	3	James Scott	6 ft 5 in (1.96 m)	185 lb (84 kg)	So	St. Benedict’s Prep	Union, NJ
G	4	Tyler Hooker	6 ft 0 in (1.83 m)	155 lb (70 kg)	RS So	Moravian Prep	Simpsonville, SC
F	5	Isaac Mbuyamba	6 ft 6 in (1.98 m)	232 lb (105 kg)	So	Parkrose HS	Portland, OR
G	11	Kyle Clarke	6 ft 5 in (1.96 m)	200 lb (91 kg)	Jr	Oldsmar Christian School	Daytona Beach, FL
G	13	Tristan Jarrett	6 ft 4 in (1.93 m)	196 lb (89 kg)	Fr	Haywood County HS	Brownsville, TN
F	15	Arthur Gray (W)	6 ft 6 in (1.98 m)	234 lb (106 kg)	RS Sr	Collins Hill HS; North Greenville	Lawrenceville, GA
G	21	Nick Masterson	6 ft 6 in (1.98 m)	214 lb (97 kg)	Sr	River Ridge HS	Woodstock, GA
F	24	Bryson Lockley	6 ft 7 in (2.01 m)	203 lb (92 kg)	RS So	Cy Fair HS; Panola CC	Houston, TX
G	31	Isaiah Rose (W)	6 ft 4 in (1.93 m)	—	Jr	Northview HS; Frank Phillips College	Alpharetta, GA
F	33	Kosta Jankovic	6 ft 7 in (2.01 m)	203 lb (92 kg)	Jr	Renaissance Academy (Los Angeles)	Belgrade, Serbia
G	35	Markus Smith (W)	6 ft 4 in (1.93 m)	188 lb (85 kg)	Fr	Brookwood HS	Snellville, GA

Head coach

- Al Skinner (UMass)

Assistant coach(es)

- Michael Cotton (Boston College)
- Carlton Owens (Rhode Island)
- Stephen Cox (Clayton St.)

Legend

- (C) Team captain
- (S) Suspended
- (I) Ineligible
- (W) Walk-on
- Injured
- Current redshirt

Roster

== Schedule and results ==
Date time, TV	Rank^{#}	Opponent^{#}	Result	Record	Site (attendance) city, state
Exhibition
Nov 5, 2017*; 4:30 pm		West Georgia	W 96–76		KSU Convocation Center (667); Kennesaw, GA
Non-conference regular season
Nov 10, 2017*; 7:00 pm, FCS		at Butler	L 64–82	0–1	Hinkle Fieldhouse (9,138); Indianapolis, IN
Nov 13, 2017*; 7:00 pm		at Hofstra	L 57–75	0–2	Mack Sports Complex (1,013); Hempstead, NY
Nov 16, 2017*; 7:00 pm, ESPN3		Piedmont	W 77–54	1–2	KSU Convocation Center (1,056); Kennesaw, GA
Nov 16, 2017*; 7:00 pm		at Tennessee Tech	L 68–82	1–3	Eblen Center (1,116); Cookeville, TN
Nov 22, 2017*; 7:00 pm, ACCN Extra		at Florida State	L 79–98	1–4	Donald L. Tucker Civic Center (5,284); Tallahassee, FL
Nov 25, 2017*; 7:00 pm, ESPN3		Tennessee State	L 74–77	1–5	KSU Convocation Center (981); Kennesaw, GA
Nov 28, 2017*; 9:00 pm, P12N		at Washington	L 71–85	1–6	Alaska Airlines Arena (4,858); Seattle, WA
Nov 30, 2017*; 10:30 pm		at Seattle	L 54–66	1–7	Connolly Center (782); Seattle, WA
Dec 13, 2017*; 9:00 pm, FSSW+		at No. 24 Texas Tech	L 53–82	1–8	United Supermarkets Arena (7,026); Lubbock, TX
Dec 16, 2017*; 7:00 pm, ESPN3		Bethune–Cookman	W 81–74	2–8	KSU Convocation Center (708); Kennesaw, GA
Dec 19, 2017*; 7:00 pm, ESPN3		Georgia Southern	L 69–78	2–9	KSU Convocation Center (1,356); Kennesaw, GA
Dec 21, 2017*; 7:00 pm, ESPN3		Samford	W 71–66	3–9	KSU Convocation Center (876); Kennesaw, GA
Dec 28, 2017*; 7:00 pm, ESPN3		at Mercer	L 56–89	3–10	Hawkins Arena (3,513); Macon, GA
Dec 30, 2017*; 4:00 pm, ESPN3		Yale	L 74–89	3–11	KSU Convocation Center (1,200); Kennesaw, GA
Jan 2, 2018*; 7:00 pm, ESPN3		Carver Bible College	W 98–75	4–11	KSU Convocation Center (692); Kennesaw, GA
Atlantic Sun Conference regular season
Jan 6, 2018; 4:30 pm, ESPN3		Lipscomb	L 71–86	4–12 (0–1)	KSU Convocation Center (1,075); Kennesaw, GA
Jan 11, 2018; 7:00 pm, ESPN3		at Jacksonville	L 58–65	4–13 (0–2)	Swisher Gymnasium (947); Jacksonville, FL
Jan 13, 2018; 7:00 pm, ESPN3		at North Florida	L 78–85	4–14 (0–3)	UNF Arena (1,669); Jacksonville, FL
Jan 18, 2018; 7:00 pm, ESPN3		Stetson	W 95–81	5–14 (1–3)	KSU Convocation Center (1,176); Kennesaw, GA
Jan 20, 2018; 4:30 pm, ESPN3		Florida Gulf Coast	L 49–66	5–15 (1–4)	KSU Convocation Center (1,502); Kennesaw, GA
Jan 24, 2018; 7:00 pm, ESPN3		NJIT	L 60–66	5–16 (1–5)	KSU Convocation Center (1,119); Kennesaw, GA
Jan 27, 2018; 2:00 pm, ESPN3		at USC Upstate	W 81–80	6–16 (2–5)	G. B. Hodge Center (704); Spartanburg, SC
Jan 29, 2018; 7:00 pm, ESPN3		at NJIT	L 71–74	6–17 (2–6)	Wellness and Events Center (593); Newark, NJ
Feb 3, 2018; 4:30 pm, ESPN3		USC Upstate	W 93–69	7–17 (3–6)	KSU Convocation Center (1,171); Kennesaw, GA
Feb 8, 2018; 7:00 pm, ESPN3		North Florida	W 89	8–17 (4–6)	KSU Convocation Center (1,336); Kennesaw, GA
Feb 10, 2018; 4:30 pm, ESPN3		Jacksonville	W 78–54	9–17 (5–6)	KSU Convocation Center (1,391); Kennesaw, GA
Feb 15, 2018; 7:00 pm, ESPN3		at Florida Gulf Coast	W 97–93	10–17 (6–6)	Alico Arena (3,825); Fort Myers, FL
Feb 17, 2018; 4:00 pm, ESPN3		at Stetson	L 74–86	10–18 (6–7)	Edmunds Center (632); DeLand, FL
Feb 22, 2018; 7:30 pm, ESPN3		at Lipscomb	L 74–83	10–19 (6–8)	Allen Arena (1,150); Nashville, TN
Atlantic Sun tournament
Feb 26, 2018; 7:00 pm, ESPN3	(6)	at (3) Jacksonville; Quarterfinals	L 68–87	10–20	Swisher Gymnasium (725); Jacksonville, FL
*Non-conference game. ^{#}Rankings from AP Poll. (#) Tournament seedings in parentheses. All times are in Eastern Time.
