= 2017–18 Florida Gulf Coast Eagles men's basketball team =

American college basketball season

2017–18 Florida Gulf Coast Eagles men's basketball
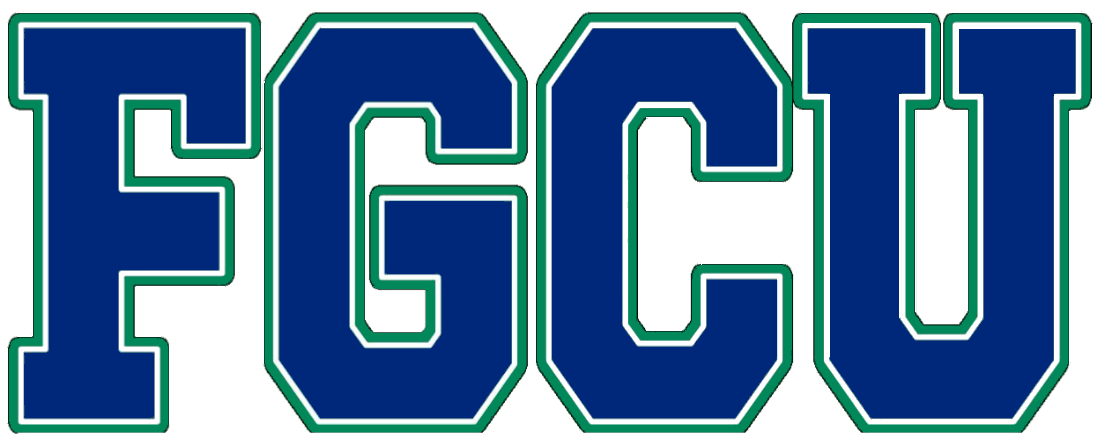

Atlantic Sun regular season champions

NIT, first round
- Conference: Atlantic Sun Conference
- Record: 23–12 (12–2 ASUN)
- Head coach: Joe Dooley (5th season)
- Assistant coaches: Michael Fly (7th season); Tom Abatemarco (3rd season); David Cason (1st season)
- Home arena: Alico Arena

2017–18 ASUN men's basketball standings
	Conf.				Overall
Team	W		L	PCT	W		L	PCT
Florida Gulf Coast	12	–	2	.857	23	–	12	.657
Lipscomb †	10	–	4	.714	23	–	10	.697
Jacksonville	8	–	6	.571	15	–	18	.455
NJIT	7	–	7	.500	14	–	16	.467
North Florida	7	–	7	.500	14	–	19	.424
Kennesaw State	6	–	8	.429	10	–	20	.333
Stetson	4	–	10	.286	12	–	20	.375
USC Upstate	2	–	12	.143	7	–	25	.219
† 2018 ASUN Tournament winner

The 2017–18 Florida Gulf Coast Eagles men's basketball team represented Florida Gulf Coast University in the 2017–18 NCAA Division I men's basketball season. The Eagles were led by fifth-year head coach Joe Dooley and played their home games at Alico Arena in Fort Myers, Florida as members of the Atlantic Sun Conference. They finished the season 23–12, 12–2 in ASUN play to win the ASUN regular season championship. In the ASUN tournament, they defeated USC Upstate and North Florida to advance to the championship game where they lost to Lipscomb. As a regular season conference champion who failed to win their conference tournament, they received an automatic bid to the National Invitation Tournament where they lost in the first round to Oklahoma State.

On April 4, 2018, head coach Joe Dooley left the school to become the head coach at East Carolina, where he was previously the head coach from 1995 to 1999. The following day, assistant head coach Michael Fly was promoted to head coach.

== Previous season ==
The Eagles finished the 2016–17 season 26–8, 12–2 in ASUN play to win the regular season championship. As the No. 1 seed in the ASUN tournament, they defeated Stetson, Kennesaw State, and North Florida to win the tournament championship. As a result, they received the conference's automatic bid to the NCAA tournament. As a No. 14 seed in the West region, they lost in the first round to No. 3-seeded Florida State.

== Offseason ==
=== Departures ===
Name	Number	Pos.	Height	Weight	Year	Hometown	Reason for departure
Reggie Reid	1	G	5'11"	162	Sophomore	Harlem, GA	Graduate transferred to Texas A&M–Commerce
Rayjon Tucker	3	G	6'5"	205	Sophomore	Charlotte, NC	Transferred to Little Rock
Maxx Bleecher	4	G	6'2"	180	Sophomore	Boca Raton, FL	Walk-on; left the team for personal reasons
Kevin Mickle	10	F	6'7"	220	RS Junior	Brooklyn, NY	Graduate transferred to Ohio
C. J. Williamson	12	G	6'6"	200	Sophomore	Orlando, FL	Dismissed from the team
Demetris Morant	21	F	6'9"	209	RS Senior	Las Vegas, NV	Graduated
Marc-Eddy Norelia	25	F	6'8"	218	RS Senior	Orlando, FL	Graduated

=== Incoming transfers ===
Name	Number	Pos.	Height	Weight	Year	Hometown	Previous School
Troy Baxter Jr.	1	F	6'8"	200	SO	Tallahassee, FL	Transferred in June 2017 from UNLV following his freshman season. Will sit out the 2017–18 season in accordance with NCAA transfer rules, but will then have three years of eligibility beginning as a redshirt sophomore in 2018–19.
Ricky Doyle	15	F	6'10"	250	JR	Cape Coral, FL	Transferred from Michigan in May 2016 following his sophomore season with the Wolverines. He will have two years of eligibility beginning as a redshirt junior in 2017–18 after sitting out the 2016–17 season per NCAA transfer rules.
Brady Ernst	21	F	6'10"	230	SO	Clinton, IA	Transferred from Indian Hills Community College in April 2017 and will have three years of eligibility remaining, beginning immediately as a redshirt sophomore in 2017–18.
Michael Gilmore	24	F	6'10"	210	JR	Jacksonville, FL	Transferred in January 2017 from Miami, where he was sitting out after transferring there from VCU in the summer of 2016. Will sit out two semesters per NCAA transfer rules, and will be eligible to begin play in December 2017 following completion of the fall semester. He will be eligible for the duration of the 2017–18 season and the entire 2018–19 campaign.
Dinero Mercurius	31	G	6'4"	200	JR	Orlando, FL	Transferred in April 2017 from Daytona State College. He will have two seasons of eligibility remaining, beginning immediately as a redshirt junior in 2017–18.

=== 2017 recruiting class ===
College recruiting
Name	Hometown	School	Height	Weight	Commit date
Brian Thomas; PF	Marietta, GA		6 ft 9 in (2.06 m)	240 lb (110 kg)	
Brian Thomas; PF	Recruit ratings: No ratings found				
Darnell Rogers; PG	Fort Mill, SC	Believe Preparatory School	5 ft 3 in (1.60 m)	150 lb (68 kg)	
Darnell Rogers; PG	Recruit ratings: No ratings found				
Overall recruit ranking: Scout: NR Rivals: NR ESPN: NR
Note: In many cases, Scout, Rivals, 247Sports, On3, and ESPN may conflict in their listings of height and weight.; In these cases, the average was taken. ESPN grades are on a 100-point scale.; Sources: "2017 Team Ranking". Rivals.

== Roster ==
2017–18 Florida Gulf Coast Eagles men's basketball team
Players
Coaches

Pos.	#	Name	Height	Weight	Year	Previous school	Hometown
G	0	Brandon Goodwin	6 ft 2 in (1.88 m)	180 lb (82 kg)	RS Jr	Norcross HS / UCF	Norcross, GA
F	1	Troy Baxter Jr. (redshirt)	6 ft 8 in (2.03 m)	200 lb (91 kg)	So	Oldsmar Christian High School / UNLV	Tallahassee, FL
G	2	Joshua Ko (W)	6 ft 1 in (1.85 m)	167 lb (76 kg)	RS Sr	Kalaheo HS / Pittsburgh	Kailua, HI
G	3	Darnell Rogers	5 ft 2 in (1.57 m)	150 lb (68 kg)	Fr	Indian Land HS / Believe Prep	Baltimore, MD
G	5	Zach Johnson	6 ft 2 in (1.88 m)	195 lb (88 kg)	RS Jr	Norland HS	Miami, FL
G	10	Kyle Hoffman (W)	5 ft 9 in (1.75 m)	140 lb (64 kg)	So	Lawrence HS / Ottawa University	Lawrence, KS
G	11	Christian Terrell	6 ft 5 in (1.96 m)	187 lb (85 kg)	Sr	Providence School of Jacksonville	Jacksonville, FL
F	13	RaySean Scott Jr.	6 ft 7 in (2.01 m)	213 lb (97 kg)	So	Compton HS	Compton, CA
F	15	Ricky Doyle	6 ft 10 in (2.08 m)	253 lb (115 kg)	RS Jr	Bishop Verot HS / Michigan	Cape Coral, FL
F	21	Brady Ernst	6 ft 10 in (2.08 m)	230 lb (104 kg)	RS So	Clinton HS / Indian Hills CC	Clinton, IA
G	23	Christian Carlyle	6 ft 6 in (1.98 m)	210 lb (95 kg)	So	Bishop Kenny HS	Jacksonville, FL
F	24	Michael Gilmore (redshirt)	6 ft 10 in (2.08 m)	210 lb (95 kg)	Jr	Rickards HS / Miami / VCU	Jacksonville, FL
F	30	Brian Thomas	6 ft 9 in (2.06 m)	240 lb (109 kg)	Fr	Kell HS	Marietta, GA
G	31	Dinero Mercurius	6 ft 4 in (1.93 m)	200 lb (91 kg)	RS Jr	Faith Baptist Christian School / Daytona State	Orlando, FL
G	32	Antravious Simmons	6 ft 9 in (2.06 m)	250 lb (113 kg)	RS Sr	South Miami HS / VCU	Miami, FL
G	33	Dolan Mahoney (W)	6 ft 2 in (1.88 m)	185 lb (84 kg)	Jr	IMG Academy	Bradenton, FL
C	55	Ryan Rocuant (W)	6 ft 10 in (2.08 m)	220 lb (100 kg)	Fr	Estero HS	Estero, FL

Head coach

- Joe Dooley (George Washington)

Assistant coach(es)

- Michael Fly (Kentucky)
- Tom Abatemarco (Dowling)
- David Cason (Illinois State)

Legend

- (C) Team captain
- (S) Suspended
- (I) Ineligible
- (W) Walk-on
- Injured
- Current redshirt

Roster
Last update: Sep 28, 2017

== Schedule and results ==
Date time, TV	Rank^{#}	Opponent^{#}	Result	Record	High points	High rebounds	High assists	Site (attendance) city, state
Non-conference regular season
Nov 11, 2017*; 1:00 pm, ESPN3		Illinois State	W 98–87	1–0	27 – Johnson	9 – Carlyle	7 – Goodwin	Alico Arena (4,335); Fort Myers, FL
Nov 13, 2017*; 7:00 pm		at Siena	W 86–53	2–0	16 – Tied	11 – Doyle	4 – Goodwin	Times Union Center (5,387); Albany, NY
Nov 18, 2017*; 6:00 pm, ESPN3		at Bowling Green	L 80–83	2–1	18 – Terrell	7 – Tied	5 – Goodwin	Stroh Center (2,440); Bowling Green, OH
Nov 21, 2017*; 7:30 pm, Stadium		at Middle Tennessee	L 72–85	2–2	20 – Goodwin	8 – Terrell	3 – Tied	Murphy Center (5,017); Murfreesboro, TN
Nov 24, 2017*; 7:00 pm, ESPN3		Denver; FGCU Shootout	W 79–71	3–2	20 – Johnson	8 – Scott	5 – Terrell	Alico Arena (3,517); Fort Myers, FL
Nov 25, 2017*; 7:00 pm, ESPN3		Navy; FGCU Shootout	W 70–54	4–2	19 – Goodwin	10 – Terrell	3 – Johnson	Alico Arena (3,597); Fort Myers, FL
Nov 26, 2017*; 6:00 pm, ESPN3		St. Francis Brooklyn; FGCU Shootout	W 75–51	5–2	20 – Terrell	10 – Scott	3 – Johnson	Alico Arena (2,929); Fort Myers, FL
Nov 29, 2017*; 7:00 pm, ESPN3		Webber International; FGCU Shootout	W 115–61	6–2	18 – Terrell	10 – Terrell	10 – Goodwin	Alico Arena (3,100); Fort Myers, FL
Dec 2, 2017*; 7:00 pm, ESPN3		Middle Tennessee	L 76–81	6–3	26 – Goodwin	8 – Terrell	5 – Terrell	Alico Arena (3,931); Fort Myers, FL
Dec 5, 2017*; 7:30 pm, ESPN3		Florida Atlantic	L 88–92	6–4	23 – Goodwin	11 – Goodwin	4 – Goodwin	Alico Arena (3,418); Fort Myers, FL
Dec 9, 2017*; 3:00 pm, ESPN3		at Texas–Arlington	W 85–78	7–4	23 – Goodwin	3 – 3 tied	8 – Goodwin	College Park Center (2,635); Arlington, TX
Dec 16, 2017*; 8:15 pm, ESPN3		Oral Roberts	L 64–83	7–5	20 – Goodwin	5 – Simmons	8 – Johnson	Alico Arena (3,316); Fort Myers, FL
Dec 19, 2017*; 7:00 pm		at FIU	L 88–91	7–6	24 – Goodwin	9 – Tied	8 – Goodwin	FIU Arena (509); Miami, FL
Dec 22, 2017*; 7:00 pm, CBSSN		at No. 11 Wichita State	L 65–75	7–7	20 – Goodwin	8 – Goodwin	3 – Goodwin	Charles Koch Arena (10,506); Wichita, KS
Dec 27, 2017*; 7:00 pm, ESPNU		at Rhode Island	L 60–80	7–8	14 – Simmons	5 – Gilmore	2 – Tied	Ryan Center (5,347); Kingston, RI
Dec 29, 2017*; 5:00 pm, ESPN3		Florida Memorial	W 76–42	8–8	19 – Johnson	5 – 4 tied	5 – Johnson	Alico Arena (3,320); Fort Myers, FL
Dec 31, 2017*; 1:00 pm, ESPN3		Florida Tech	W 62–54	9–8	15 – Mercurius	6 – Goodwin	11 – Goodwin	Alico Arena (2,904); Fort Myers, FL
Atlantic Sun Conference regular season
Jan 6, 2018; 7:00 pm, ESPN3		Stetson	W 90–52	10–8 (1–0)	19 – Johnson	8 – Thomas	6 – Terrell	Alico Arena (4,016); Fort Myers, FL
Jan 11, 2018; 7:00 pm, ESPN3		USC Upstate	W 75–58	11–8 (2–0)	17 – Johnson	9 – Goodwin	6 – Johnson	Alico Arena (3,633); Fort Myers, FL
Jan 13, 2018; 7:00 pm, ESPN3		NJIT	W 68–54	12–8 (3–0)	21 – Goodwin	10 – Goodwin	8 – Goodwin	Alico Arena (3,517); Fort Myers, FL
Jan 18, 2018; 7:30 pm, ESPN3		at Lipscomb	W 88–83	13–8 (4–0)	22 – Goodwin	7 – Simmons	9 – Goodwin	Allen Arena (1,147); Nashville, TN
Jan 20, 2018; 4:30 pm, ESPN3		at Kennesaw State	W 66–49	14–8 (5–0)	20 – 3 tied	14 – Pepper	8 – Cooper	KSU Convocation Center (1,502); Kennesaw, GA
Jan 24, 2018; 7:00 pm, ESPN3		at North Florida	W 96–87	15–8 (6–0)	19 – Johnson	11 – Gilmore	6 – Terrell	UNF Arena (2,248); Jacksonville, FL
Jan 27, 2018; 7:00 pm, ESPN3		Jacksonville	W 68–62	16–8 (7–0)	18 – Johnson	10 – Gilmore	2 – Goodwin	Alico Arena (4,427); Fort Myers, FL
Jan 29, 2018; 7:00 pm, ESPN3		North Florida	W 103–70	17–8 (8–0)	16 – Johnson	12 – Gilmore	7 – Johnson	Alico Arena (4,016); Fort Myers, FL
Feb 3, 2018; 6:00 pm, ESPN3		at Jacksonville	W 80–55	18–8 (9–0)	25 – Johnson	6 – 3 tied	6 – Terrell	Swisher Gymnasium (1,283); Jacksonville, FL
Feb 8, 2018; 7:00 pm, ESPN3		at NJIT	W 75–70	19–8 (10–0)	17 – Terrell	9 – Goodwin	4 – Goodwin	Wellness and Events Center (661); Newark, NJ
Feb 10, 2018; 4:00 pm, ESPN3		at USC Upstate	W 88–71	20–8 (11–0)	21 – Scott	6 – 4 tied	6 – Tied	G. B. Hodge Center (833); Spartanburg, SC
Feb 15, 2018; 7:00 pm, ESPN3		Kennesaw State	L 93–97	20–9 (11–1)	28 – Goodwin	8 – Terrell	4 – Goodwin	Alico Arena (3,825); Fort Myers, FL
Feb 17, 2018; 7:00 pm, ESPN3		Lipscomb	L 87–90	20–10 (11–2)	28 – Goodwin	7 – Gilmore	5 – Goodwin	Alico Arena (4,497); Fort Myers, FL
Feb 22, 2018; 7:00 pm, ESPN3		at Stetson	W 76–60	21–10 (12–2)	27 – Goodwin	8 – Tied	4 – Tied	Edmunds Center (1,150); DeLand, FL
Atlantic Sun tournament
Feb 26, 2018; 7:00 pm, ESPN3	(1)	(8) USC Upstate; Quarterfinals	W 96–76	22–10	26 – Johnson	8 – Simmons	8 – Terrell	Alico Arena (2,832); Fort Myers, FL
Mar 1, 2018; 7:00 pm, ESPN3	(1)	(5) North Florida; Semifinals	W 95–72	23–10	18 – Goodwin	6 – Tied	7 – Terrell	Alico Arena (3,321); Fort Myers, FL
Mar 4, 2018; 3:00 pm, ESPN	(1)	(2) Lipscomb; Championship game	L 96–108	23–11	37 – Johnson	8 – Simmons	4 – Tied	Alico Arena (4,633); Fort Myers, FL
NIT
Mar 13, 2018*; 8:00 pm, ESPN2	(7)	at (2) Oklahoma State; First Round – USC Bracket	L 68–80	23–12	23 – Johnson	6 – Goodwin	5 – Goodwin	Gallagher-Iba Arena (5,305); Stillwater, OK
*Non-conference game. ^{#}Rankings from AP Poll. (#) Tournament seedings in parentheses. All times are in Eastern Time.
