= 2017–18 Stetson Hatters men's basketball team =

American college basketball season

2017–18 Stetson Hatters men's basketball
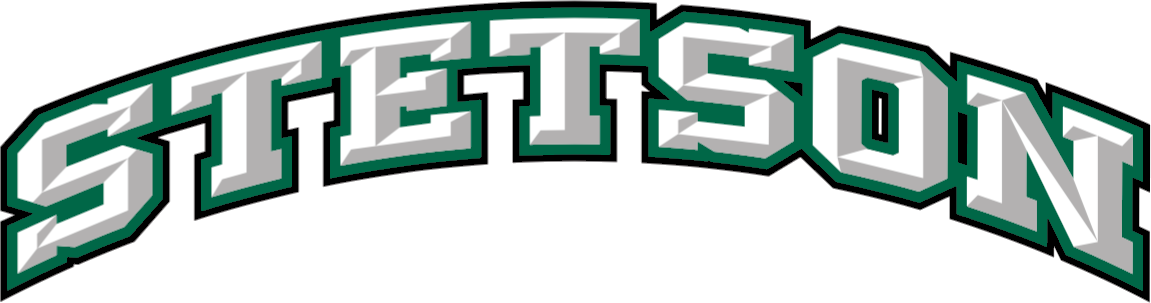
- Conference: Atlantic Sun Conference
- Record: 12–20 (4–10 ASUN)
- Head coach: Corey Williams (5th season)
- Assistant coaches: Bert Capel; Kevin Dux; Sean Woods
- Home arena: Edmunds Center

2017–18 ASUN men's basketball standings
	Conf.				Overall
Team	W		L	PCT	W		L	PCT
Florida Gulf Coast	12	–	2	.857	23	–	12	.657
Lipscomb †	10	–	4	.714	23	–	10	.697
Jacksonville	8	–	6	.571	15	–	18	.455
NJIT	7	–	7	.500	14	–	16	.467
North Florida	7	–	7	.500	14	–	19	.424
Kennesaw State	6	–	8	.429	10	–	20	.333
Stetson	4	–	10	.286	12	–	20	.375
USC Upstate	2	–	12	.143	7	–	25	.219
† 2018 ASUN Tournament winner

The 2017–18 Stetson Hatters men's basketball team represented Stetson University during the 2017–18 NCAA Division I men's basketball season. The Hatters, led by fifth-year head coach Corey Williams, played their home games at the Edmunds Center in DeLand, Florida as members of the Atlantic Sun Conference. They finished the season 12–20, 4–10 in ASUN play to finish in seventh place. They lost in the quarterfinals of the ASUN tournament to Lipscomb.

== Previous season ==
The Hatters finished the 2016–17 season 11–21, 3–11 in ASUN play to finish in a tie for seventh place. They lost in the quarterfinals of the ASUN tournament to Florida Gulf Coast.

== Offseason ==
=== Departures ===
Name	Number	Pos.	Height	Weight	Year	Hometown	Reason for departure
Grant Lozoya	2	G	6'2"	190	Junior	Westlake Village, CA	Graduate transferred to Pittsburg State
Will Hollmann	21	F/C	6'8"	245	Sophomore	DeLand, FL	Walk-on; left the team for personal reasons
Derick Newton	22	F	6'6"	220	Sophomore	Beverly Hills, CA	Declare for 2017 G-League draft
Kevin Ndahiro	23	F/C	6'9"	225	Sophomore	Ottawa, ON	Graduate transferred to South Alabama
Brian Pegg	41	F	6'7"	235	RS Senior	Clearwater, FL	Graduated

=== Incoming transfers ===
Name	Number	Pos.	Height	Weight	Year	Hometown	Previous School
Ricky Gouety	21	F	6'10"	200	Junior	Abidjan, Ivory Coast	Junior college transferred from Indian Hills CC

=== 2017 recruiting class ===
College recruiting information
Name	Hometown	School	Height	Weight	Commit date
Kenny Aninye #109 SG	Marietta, GA	Wheeler High School	6 ft 1 in (1.85 m)	195 lb (88 kg)	
Kenny Aninye #109 SG	Recruit ratings: Scout: Rivals: (59)				
Keith Matthews; SF	Blythewood, SC	Blythewood High School	6 ft 6 in (1.98 m)	173 lb (78 kg)	Sep 10, 2016
Keith Matthews; SF	Recruit ratings: Scout: Rivals: (NR)				
Christian Jones; SG	Columbia, SC	Cardinal Newman School	6 ft 4 in (1.93 m)	N/A	
Christian Jones; SG	Recruit ratings: Scout: Rivals: (NR)				
Abayomi Iyiola; SF	Decatur, GA	Greenforest Christian Academy	6 ft 9 in (2.06 m)	210 lb (95 kg)	
Abayomi Iyiola; SF	Recruit ratings: Scout: Rivals: (NR)				
Overall recruit ranking:
Note: In many cases, Scout, Rivals, 247Sports, On3, and ESPN may conflict in their listings of height and weight.; In these cases, the average was taken. ESPN grades are on a 100-point scale.; Sources: "2017 Team Ranking". Rivals.

== Roster ==
2017–18 Stetson Hatters men's basketball team
Players
Coaches

Pos.	#	Name	Height	Weight	Year	Previous school	Hometown
G	0	Christian Jones	6 ft 4 in (1.93 m)	175 lb (79 kg)	Fr	Cardinal Newman HS	Columbia, SC
G/F	1	Keith Matthews	6 ft 7 in (2.01 m)	185 lb (84 kg)	Fr	Blythewood HS	Blythewood, SC
G	2	Raine McKeython (W)	6 ft 1 in (1.85 m)	185 lb (84 kg)	Fr	Riverdale Baptist School	Washington, DC
G	3	B. J. Glasford	6 ft 4 in (1.93 m)	195 lb (88 kg)	RS Sr	Coral Reef Senior HS	Miami, FL
G	4	Divine Myles	5 ft 11 in (1.8 m)	185 lb (84 kg)	Sr	Mattie T. Blount HS	Mobile, AL
G	5	Angel Rivera	5 ft 8 in (1.73 m)	165 lb (75 kg)	Sr	IMG Academy	Bayamón, PR
G	10	Kenny Aninye	6 ft 1 in (1.85 m)	185 lb (84 kg)	Fr	Wheeler HS	Marietta, GA
G	13	Matthew Cioce (W)	6 ft 2 in (1.88 m)	190 lb (86 kg)	Sr	Christ School	Asheville, NC
F/C	14	Larry Dennis	6 ft 9 in (2.06 m)	220 lb (100 kg)	Sr	Sunrise Christian Academy; Hutchinson Community College	Wichita, KS
F	15	Clay Verk	6 ft 8 in (2.03 m)	260 lb (118 kg)	So	ThunderRidge HS	Highlands Ranch, CO
G	20	Brady Moses (W)	6 ft 3 in (1.91 m)	175 lb (79 kg)	Sr	Lodi HS; Maranatha Baptist University	Lodi, WI
F	21	Ricky Gouety	6 ft 10 in (2.08 m)	210 lb (95 kg)	Jr	Victory Christian Academy; Indian Hills CC	Abidjan, Ivory Coast
F	23	Abayomi Iyitola	6 ft 9 in (2.06 m)	210 lb (95 kg)	Fr	Greenforest Christian Academy	Atlanta, GA
C	32	Adam Webb (W)	7 ft 2 in (2.18 m)	220 lb (100 kg)	Fr	Lakeland Christian HS	Lakeland, FL
G	33	Luke Doyle	6 ft 5 in (1.96 m)	205 lb (93 kg)	RS Sr	Paul J. Hagerty HS; Nicholls State	Oviedo, FL
G/F	35	Leo Goodman	6 ft 5 in (1.96 m)	210 lb (95 kg)	Jr	Theodore Roosevelt HS	Saginaw, MI

Head coach

- Corey Williams (Oklahoma State)

Assistant coach(es)

- Bert Capel (Evangel University)
- Kevin Dux (Florida State)
- Sean Woods (Kentucky)

Legend

- (C) Team captain
- (S) Suspended
- (I) Ineligible
- (W) Walk-on
- Injured
- Current redshirt

Roster

== Schedule and results ==
Date time, TV	Rank^{#}	Opponent^{#}	Result	Record	Site (attendance) city, state
Regular season
Nov 10, 2017*; 8:00 pm, ESPN3		Webber International	W 98–89	1–0	Edmunds Center (475); DeLand, FL
Nov 12, 2017*; 7:00 pm		at FIU	W 70–67 ^{OT}	2–0	FIU Arena (605); Miami, FL
Nov 15, 2017*; 8:00 pm, ESPN3		South Florida	L 72–75	2–1	Edmunds Center (836); DeLand, FL
Nov 18, 2017*; 1:00 pm, ESPN3		SIU Edwardsville	L 76–80	2–2	Edmunds Center (475); DeLand, FL
Nov 20, 2017*; 7:00 pm, ESPN3		Ave Maria; Hoops In the Heartland	W 87–53	3–2	Edmunds Center (402); DeLand, FL
Nov 22, 2017*; 8:05 pm		at South Alabama	W 81–77	4–2	Mitchell Center (1,737); Mobile, AL
Nov 25, 2017*; 8:00 pm, ESPN3		at North Dakota State; Hoops In the Heartland	L 58–94	4–3	Scheels Arena (2,532); Fargo, ND
Nov 27, 2017*; 8:00 pm, ESPN3		at Green Bay; Hoops In the Heartland	W 83–71	5–3	Resch Center (1,836); Green Bay, WI
Nov 30, 2017*; 7:00 pm, ESPN3		Campbell	L 78–85	5–4	Edmunds Center (460); DeLand, FL
Dec 1, 2017*; 7:00 pm, ESPN3		Edward Waters; Hoops In the Heartland	W 85–52	6–4	Edmunds Center (515); DeLand, FL
Dec 6, 2017*; 8:00 pm		at Duquesne	L 59–73	6–5	Palumbo Center (1,191); Pittsburgh, PA
Dec 9, 2017*; 1:00 pm, ESPN3		at Marist	W 79–76	7–5	McCann Field House (1,123); Poughkeepsie, NY
Dec 16, 2017*; 3:00 pm		at Fort Wayne	L 84–88	7–6	Memorial Coliseum (1,237); Fort Wayne, IN
Dec 19, 2017*; 6:00 pm, ESPN3		UCF	L 55–74	7–7	Edmunds Center (1,918); DeLand, FL
Dec 29, 2017*; 8:00 pm, BTN+		at Nebraska	L 62–71	7–8	Pinnacle Bank Arena (15,040); Lincoln, NE
Jan 1, 2018*; 1:00 pm, ESPN3		Florida National	W 94–88	8–8	Edmunds Center (312); DeLand, FL
Jan 6, 2018; 7:00 pm, ESPN3		at Florida Gulf Coast	L 52–90	8–9 (0–1)	Alico Arena (4,016); Fort Myers, FL
Jan 11, 2018; 7:00 pm, ESPN3		NJIT	W 80–67	9–9 (1–1)	Edmunds Center (398); DeLand, FL
Jan 13, 2018; 4:00 pm, ESPN3		USC Upstate	W 87–69	10–9 (2–1)	Edmunds Center (543); DeLand, FL
Jan 15, 2018*; 4:00 pm, ESPN3		Bethune–Cookman	L 62–74	10–10	Edmunds Center (732); DeLand, FL
Jan 18, 2018; 7:00 pm, ESPN3		at Kennesaw State	L 81–95	10–11 (2–2)	KSU Convocation Center (1,176); Kennesaw, GA
Jan 20, 2018; 5:00 pm, ESPN3		at Lipscomb	L 82–85	10–12 (2–3)	Allen Arena (1,644); Nashville, TN
Jan 24, 2018; 7:00 pm, ESPN3		at Jacksonville	L 69–76	10–13 (2–4)	Swisher Gymnasium (832); Jacksonville, FL
Jan 27, 2018; 4:00 pm, ESPN3		North Florida	L 65–73	10–14 (2–5)	Edmunds Center (893); DeLand, FL
Jan 29, 2018; 7:00 pm, ESPN3		Jacksonville	L 67–68	10–15 (2–6)	Edmunds Center (748); DeLand, FL
Feb 3, 2018; 7:00 pm, ESPN3		at North Florida	L 91–97	10–16 (2–7)	UNF Arena (2,001); Jacksonville, FL
Feb 8, 2018; 7:00 pm, ESPN3		at USC Upstate	L 79–91	10–17 (2–8)	G. B. Hodge Center (837); Spartanburg, SC
Feb 10, 2018; 4:00 pm, ESPN3		at NJIT	W 84–80	11–17 (3–8)	Wellness and Events Center (788); Newark, NJ
Feb 15, 2018; 7:00 pm, ESPN3		Lipscomb	L 73–82	11–18 (3–9)	Edmunds Center (412); DeLand, FL
Feb 17, 2018; 4:00 pm, ESPN3		Kennesaw State	W 86–74	12–18 (4–9)	Edmunds Center (632); DeLand, FL
Feb 22, 2018; 7:00 pm, ESPN3		Florida Gulf Coast	L 60–76	12–19 (4–10)	Edmunds Center (1,150); DeLand, FL
Atlantic Sun tournament
Feb 26, 2018; 8:00 pm, ESPN3	(7)	at (2) Lipscomb; Quarterfinals	L 73–89	12–20	Allen Arena (1,877); Nashville, TN
*Non-conference game. ^{#}Rankings from AP Poll. (#) Tournament seedings in parentheses. All times are in Eastern Time.
