= 2017–18 USC Upstate Spartans men's basketball team =

American college basketball season

2017–18 USC Upstate Spartans men's basketball
- Conference: Atlantic Sun Conference
- Record: 7–25 (2–12 ASUN)
- Head coach: Kyle Perry (1st season)
- Assistant coaches: Kente Hart; Jon Cremins; Josh Chavis
- Home arena: G. B. Hodge Center

2017–18 ASUN men's basketball standings
	Conf.				Overall
Team	W		L	PCT	W		L	PCT
Florida Gulf Coast	12	–	2	.857	23	–	12	.657
Lipscomb †	10	–	4	.714	23	–	10	.697
Jacksonville	8	–	6	.571	15	–	18	.455
NJIT	7	–	7	.500	14	–	16	.467
North Florida	7	–	7	.500	14	–	19	.424
Kennesaw State	6	–	8	.429	10	–	20	.333
Stetson	4	–	10	.286	12	–	20	.375
USC Upstate	2	–	12	.143	7	–	25	.219
† 2018 ASUN Tournament winner

The 2017–18 USC Upstate Spartans men's basketball team represented the University of South Carolina Upstate during the 2017–18 NCAA Division I men's basketball season. The Spartans, led by first-year head coach Kyle Perry, played their home games at the G. B. Hodge Center in Spartanburg, South Carolina as members of the Atlantic Sun Conference. Perry was initially named interim coach upon head coach Eddie Payne's retirement on October 3, 2017, due to health concerns, but had the interim tag removed on October 20 and was named full-time head coach. They finished the season 7–25, 2–12 in ASUN play to finish in last place. They lost in the quarterfinals of the ASUN tournament to Florida Gulf Coast.

After the season, USC Upstate fired Perry on March 1, less than five months after being named full time head coach of the Spartans. On March 30, the school hired former Tulane head coach Dave Dickerson for the job.

This season marked the final season for USC Upstate as members of the Atlantic Sun Conference, as the school announced on November 15, 2017, that they will be moving to the Big South Conference for the 2018–19 season.

== Previous season ==
The Spartans finished the 2016–17 season 17–16, 7–7 in ASUN play to finish in a tie for fourth place. They lost in the quarterfinals of the ASUN tournament to Kennesaw State. They were invited to the CollegeInsider.com Tournament where they lost in the first round to Furman.

The season marked Eddie Payne's 15th and final season as head coach at USC Upstate as he announced his retirement on October 3, 2017.

== Offseason ==
=== Departures ===
Name	Number	Pos.	Height	Weight	Year	Hometown	Reason for departure
Tim Hart	5	G	6'3"	175	Freshman	Plano, TX	Left the team for personal reasons
Josh Cuthbertson	10	F	6'5"	185	Senior	New Bern, NC	Graduated
Philip Whittington	15	F	6'9"	215	Sophomore	Columbus, GA	Transferred to Kent State
Blake Edwards	21	G	6'0"	180	Sophomore	Chapin, SC	Walk-on; left the team for personal reasons
Nick Kornieck	25	F	6'7"	205	Freshman	Henderson, NV	Transferred to Doane
Michael Buchanan	44	C	7'0"	285	Senior	Las Vegas, NV	Graduated

=== Incoming transfers ===
Name	Number	Pos.	Height	Weight	Year	Hometown	Previous School
Patrick Welch	15	G	6'1"	185	Junior	Pembroke, NH	Junior college transferred from South Georgia Technical College

=== 2017 recruiting class ===
College recruiting
Name	Hometown	School	Height	Weight	Commit date
Austin Nelson; SF	Hendersonville, NC	North Henderson High School	6 ft 6 in (1.98 m)	185 lb (84 kg)	
Austin Nelson; SF	Recruit ratings: Scout: Rivals: (NR)				
Cory Kaplan; SF	Melbourne, FL	Holy Trinity Episcopal Academy	6 ft 5 in (1.96 m)	N/A	
Cory Kaplan; SF	Recruit ratings: Scout: Rivals: (NR)				
Yeskin Walker-Williams; SF	Houston, TX	Manvel High School	6 ft 4 in (1.93 m)	190 lb (86 kg)	
Yeskin Walker-Williams; SF	Recruit ratings: Scout: Rivals: (NR)				
Isaiah Anderson; C	Richmond, VA	John Marshall High School	6 ft 8 in (2.03 m)	260 lb (120 kg)	
Isaiah Anderson; C	Recruit ratings: Scout: Rivals: (NR)				
Avery Diggs; C	Brandon, FL	Clearwater Academy International	6 ft 10 in (2.08 m)	260 lb (120 kg)	
Avery Diggs; C	Recruit ratings: Scout: Rivals: (NR)				
Overall recruit ranking:
Note: In many cases, Scout, Rivals, 247Sports, On3, and ESPN may conflict in their listings of height and weight.; In these cases, the average was taken. ESPN grades are on a 100-point scale.; Sources: "2017 Team Ranking". Rivals.

== Roster ==
2017–18 USC Upstate Spartans men's basketball team
Players
Coaches

Pos.	#	Name	Height	Weight	Year	Previous school	Hometown
F	0	Malik Moore	6 ft 6 in (1.98 m)	190 lb (86 kg)	Jr	Clyde A. Erwin HS	Asheville, NC
G	1	Mike Cunningham	6 ft 0 in (1.83 m)	185 lb (84 kg)	RS Jr	DuVal HS	Washington, D.C.
G	2	Austin Nelson	6 ft 6 in (1.98 m)	194 lb (88 kg)	Fr	North Henderson HS	Hendersonville, NC
G	3	Jure Span	6 ft 4 in (1.93 m)	175 lb (79 kg)	Jr	Combine Academy	Litija, Slovenia
F	4	Ramel Thompkins	6 ft 7 in (2.01 m)	202 lb (92 kg)	Sr	Vidalia Comprehensive HS	Vidalia, GA
C	5	Avery Diggs	6 ft 10 in (2.08 m)	260 lb (118 kg)	Fr	Spoto HS	Brandon, FL
F	10	Cory Kaplan	6 ft 4 in (1.93 m)	200 lb (91 kg)	Fr	Holy Trinity Episcopal Academy	Merritt Island, FL
G	11	Deion Holmes	6 ft 3 in (1.91 m)	188 lb (85 kg)	Jr	Chesnee HS	Chesnee, SC
C	12	Isaiah Anderson	6 ft 8 in (2.03 m)	260 lb (118 kg)	Fr	John Marshall HS	Chester, VA
F	13	Carson Smith (W)	6 ft 6 in (1.98 m)	200 lb (91 kg)	RS Sr	Nation Ford HS; Brunswick CC	Fort Mill, SC
G	15	Pat Welch	5 ft 11 in (1.8 m)	181 lb (82 kg)	Jr	Pembroke Academy; South Georgia Tech	Prembroke, NH
F	21	Lloyd Hemming (W)	6 ft 4 in (1.93 m)	186 lb (84 kg)	Fr	Brookland Cayce HS	Cayce, SC
F	22	Andrew Tate (W)	6 ft 6 in (1.98 m)	188 lb (85 kg)	Fr	Spartanburg Cayce HS	Spartanburg, SC
G	23	Thomas Booker	6 ft 3 in (1.91 m)	178 lb (81 kg)	RS Fr	Bowling Green HS	Bowling Green, KY
F	33	Jacob Schulte	6 ft 7 in (2.01 m)	237 lb (108 kg)	RS Jr	Newport Central Catholic HS	Newport, KY
F	35	Yeskin Walker-Williams	6 ft 4 in (1.93 m)	190 lb (86 kg)	Fr	Manvel HS	Houston, TX

Head coach

- Kyle Perry (Georgia Tech)

Assistant coach(es)

- Kente' Hart (Carson–Newman)
- Jon Cremins (Valdosta State)
- Josh Chavis (USC Upstate)

Legend

- (C) Team captain
- (S) Suspended
- (I) Ineligible
- (W) Walk-on
- Injured
- Current redshirt

Roster

== Schedule and results ==
Date time, TV	Rank^{#}	Opponent^{#}	Result	Record	Site (attendance) city, state
Non-conference regular season
Nov 10, 2017*; 8:00 pm, BTN Plus		at No. 15 Minnesota	L 77–92	0–1	Williams Arena (10,836); Minneapolis, MN
Nov 12, 2017*; 3:00 pm, ESPN3		Allen	W 85–66	1–1	G. B. Hodge Center (653); Spartanburg, SC
Nov 14, 2017*; 7:00 pm, SECN+		at Georgia	L 65–74	1–2	Stegeman Coliseum (5,369); Athens, GA
Nov 18, 2017*; 2:00 pm, ESPN3		Charleston Southern	L 72–82	1–3	G. B. Hodge Center (528); Spartanburg, SC
Nov 20, 2017*; 7:00 pm, ESPN3		Paine	W 79–59	2–3	G. B. Hodge Center; Spartanburg, SC
Nov 24, 2017*; 5:00 pm		vs. Bowling Green; Creek Classic	L 74–83	2–4	Gore Arena (1,083); Buies Creek, NC
Nov 25, 2017*; 5:00 pm		vs. Abilene Christian; Creek Classic	W 88–78	3–4	Gore Arena (1,208); Buies Creek, NC
Nov 26, 2017*; 4:00 pm		at Campbell; Creek Classic	L 74–93	3–5	Gore Arena (1,019); Buies Creek, NC
Nov 29, 2017*; 7:00 pm		at UNC Asheville	L 70–82	3–6	Kimmel Arena (1,436); Asheville, NC
Dec 2, 2017*; 3:00 pm		at Gardner–Webb	L 66–87	3–7	Paul Porter Arena (725); Boiling Springs, NC
Dec 5, 2017*; 8:00 pm, ESPN3		at Kansas State	L 49–86	3–8	Bramlage Coliseum (6,911); Manhattan, KS
Dec 9, 2017*; 3:00 pm		at Denver	L 69–84	3–9	Magness Arena (951); Denver, CO
Dec 16, 2017*; 4:00 pm		at Jacksonville State	L 61–77	3–10	Pete Mathews Coliseum (1,222); Jacksonville, AL
Dec 18, 2017*; 11:00 am, ESPN3		Coastal Georgia	W 83–75	4–10	G. B. Hodge Center (723); Spartanburg, SC
Dec 20, 2017*; 9:00 pm, FS1		at No. 25 Creighton	L 62–116	4–11	CenturyLink Center (15,366); Omaha, NE
Dec 30, 2017*; 2:00 pm, ESPN3		North Greenville	W 80–59	5–11	G. B. Hodge Center (366); Spartanburg, SC
Jan 2, 2018*; 7:00 pm, ESPN3		UMKC	L 77–79	5–12	G. B. Hodge Center (837); Spartanburg, SC
Atlantic Sun Conference regular season
Jan 6, 2018; 4:00 pm, ESPN3		at NJIT	L 87–98	5–13 (0–1)	Wellness and Events Center (618); Newark, NJ
Jan 11, 2018; 7:00 pm, ESPN3		at Florida Gulf Coast	L 58–75	5–14 (0–2)	Alico Arena (3,633); Fort Myers, FL
Jan 13, 2018; 4:00 pm, ESPN3		at Stetson	L 69–87	5–15 (0–3)	Edmunds Center (543); DeLand, FL
Jan 18, 2018; 4:00 pm, ESPN3		Jacksonville	W 91–85	6–15 (1–3)	G. B. Hodge Center (833); Spartanburg, SC
Jan 20, 2018; 4:00 pm, ESPN3		North Florida	L 80–100	6–16 (1–4)	G. B. Hodge Center (749); Spartanburg, SC
Jan 24, 2018; 7:30 pm, ESPN3		at Lipscomb	L 78–92	6–17 (1–5)	Allen Arena (1,007); Nashville, TN
Jan 27, 2018; 7:30 pm, ESPN3		Kennesaw State	L 80–81	6–18 (1–6)	G. B. Hodge Center (704); Spartanburg, SC
Jan 29, 2018; 7:00 pm, ESPN3		Lipscomb	L 106–110 ^{2OT}	6–19 (1–7)	G. B. Hodge Center (837); Spartanburg, SC
Feb 3, 2018; 4:30 pm, ESPN3		at Kennesaw State	L 69–93	6–20 (1–8)	KSU Convocation Center (1,171); Kennesaw, GA
Feb 8, 2018; 7:00 pm, ESPN3		Stetson	W 91–79	7–20 (2–8)	G. B. Hodge Center (837); Spartanburg, SC
Feb 10, 2018; 4:00 pm, ESPN3		Florida Gulf Coast	L 71–88	7–21 (2–9)	G. B. Hodge Center (833); Spartanburg, SC
Feb 15, 2018; 7:00 pm, ESPN3		at North Florida	L 100–109	7–22 (2–10)	UNF Arena (1,606); Jacksonville, FL
Feb 17, 2018; 4:00 pm, ESPN3		at Jacksonville	L 70–82	7–23 (2–11)	Swisher Gymnasium (889); Jacksonville, FL
Feb 22, 2018; 7:00 pm, ESPN3		NJIT	L 67–76	7–24 (2–12)	G. B. Hodge Center (833); Spartanburg, SC
Atlantic Sun tournament
Feb 26, 2018; 7:00 pm, ESPN3	(8)	at (1) Florida Gulf Coast; Quarterfinals	L 76–96	7–25	Alico Arena (2,832); Fort Myers, FL
*Non-conference game. ^{#}Rankings from AP poll. (#) Tournament seedings in parentheses. All times are in Eastern Time Source.
