= 2017–18 North Florida Ospreys men's basketball team =

American college basketball season

2017–18 North Florida Ospreys men's basketball
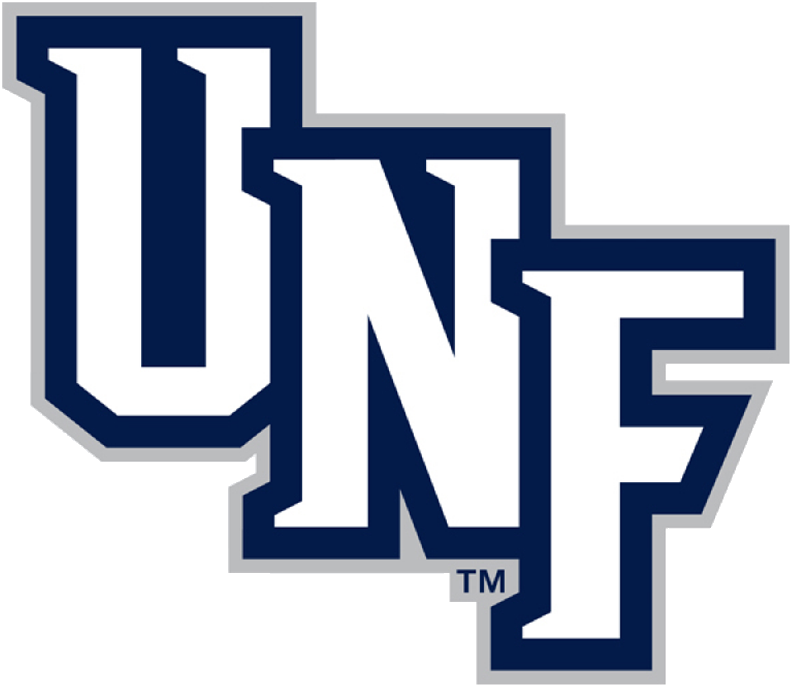
- Conference: Atlantic Sun Conference
- Record: 14–19 (7–7 ASUN)
- Head coach: Matthew Driscoll (9th season)
- Assistant coaches: Bobby Kennen; Byron Taylor; Stephen Perkins
- Home arena: UNF Arena

2017–18 ASUN men's basketball standings
	Conf.				Overall
Team	W		L	PCT	W		L	PCT
Florida Gulf Coast	12	–	2	.857	23	–	12	.657
Lipscomb †	10	–	4	.714	23	–	10	.697
Jacksonville	8	–	6	.571	15	–	18	.455
NJIT	7	–	7	.500	14	–	16	.467
North Florida	7	–	7	.500	14	–	19	.424
Kennesaw State	6	–	8	.429	10	–	20	.333
Stetson	4	–	10	.286	12	–	20	.375
USC Upstate	2	–	12	.143	7	–	25	.219
† 2018 ASUN Tournament winner

The 2017–18 North Florida Ospreys men's basketball team represented the University of North Florida during the 2017–18 NCAA Division I men's basketball season. They were led by ninth–year head coach Matthew Driscoll and played their home games at UNF Arena on the university's campus in Jacksonville, Florida as members of the Atlantic Sun Conference (ASUN). The Ospreys finished the season 14–19, 7–7 in ASUN play to finish in a tie for fourth place. In the ASUN tournament, they defeated NJIT before losing in the semifinals to Florida Gulf Coast.

== Previous season ==
The Ospreys finished the 2015–16 season 15–19, 8–6 in ASUN play to finish in third place. As the No. 3 seed in the ASUN tournament, they defeated Jacksonville and Lipscomb before losing to Florida Gulf Coast in the championship game.

== Offseason ==
=== Departures ===
Name	Number	Pos.	Height	Weight	Year	Hometown	Reason for departure
Karlos Odum	1	F	6'7"	215	RS Sophomore	Lakeland, FL	Transferred to West Georgia
C. J. Fisher	5	G	6'2"	182	Freshman	Miami, FL	Transferred to New Mexico JC
Aaron Bodager	12	G	6'5"	200	RS Senior	Oviedo, FL	Graduated
Dallas Moore	14	G	6'1"	175	Senior	St. Petersburg, FL	Graduated/Undrafted in 2017 NBA draft
Nick Malonga	23	G	6'5"	192	RS Junior	Bolingbrook, IL	Graduate transferred to Davenport
Aaron Horne	24	G/F	6'5"	180	Junior	Lake Worth, FL	Graduate transferred to Texas A&M–Commerce
Romelo Banks	33	C	6'11"	252	RS Junior	Kissimmee, FL	Left the team for personal reasons
Chris Davenport	35	F	6'8"	215	Senior	Atlanta, GA	Graduated

=== Incoming transfers ===
Name	Number	Pos.	Height	Weight	Year	Hometown	Previous School
Noah Horchler	0	F	6'8"	200	Sophomore	Indialantic, FL	Junior college transferred from Eastern Florida State College
Ivan Gandia	21	G	6'1"	170	Junior	Caguas, PR	Junior college transferred from College of Central Florida

=== 2017 recruiting class ===
College recruiting information
Name	Hometown	School	Height	Weight	Commit date
Ryan Burkhardt; SG	Saint Augustine, FL	Saint Augustine High School	6 ft 3 in (1.91 m)	155 lb (70 kg)	Jan 31, 2016
Ryan Burkhardt; SG	Recruit ratings: Scout: Rivals: (NR)				
Brian Coffey Jr. SG	Lilburn, GA	Greater Atlanta Christian School	6 ft 1 in (1.85 m)	170 lb (77 kg)	
Brian Coffey Jr. SG	Recruit ratings: Scout: Rivals: (NR)				
Wes Morgan; SG	Charlotte, NC	Ardrey Kell High School	6 ft 7 in (2.01 m)	175 lb (79 kg)	
Wes Morgan; SG	Recruit ratings: Scout: Rivals: (NR)				
Trip Day; SF	Columbus, GA	Glenwood School	6 ft 7 in (2.01 m)	205 lb (93 kg)	
Trip Day; SF	Recruit ratings: Scout: Rivals: (NR)				
Overall recruit ranking:
Note: In many cases, Scout, Rivals, 247Sports, On3, and ESPN may conflict in their listings of height and weight.; In these cases, the average was taken. ESPN grades are on a 100-point scale.; Sources: "2017 Team Ranking". Rivals.

== Roster ==
2017–18 North Florida Ospreys men's basketball team
Players
Coaches

Pos.	#	Name	Height	Weight	Year	Previous school	Hometown
F	0	Noah Horchler	6 ft 8 in (2.03 m)	200 lb (91 kg)	So	Melbourne HS; Eastern Florida State College	Melbourne, FL
G/F	1	Emmanuel Lambright	6 ft 6 in (1.98 m)	195 lb (88 kg)	Fr	Sarasota HS	Sarasota, FL
F	2	Wajid Aminu	6 ft 7 in (2.01 m)	195 lb (88 kg)	So	Wheeler HS	Stone Mountain, GA
G	3	J. T. Escobar	6 ft 2 in (1.88 m)	180 lb (82 kg)	RS So	Elev8 Prep; Ole Miss	Tallahassee, FL
G/F	5	Wes Morgan	6 ft 7 in (2.01 m)	180 lb (82 kg)	Fr	Ardrey Kell HS	Charlotte, NC
G	10	Osborn Blount	5 ft 10 in (1.78 m)	170 lb (77 kg)	RS Sr	Providence School; FSCJ	Jacksonville, FL
G	11	Garrett Sams	6 ft 6 in (1.98 m)	180 lb (82 kg)	So	Westview HS	Martin, TN
G	12	Ryan Burkhardt	6 ft 4 in (1.93 m)	185 lb (84 kg)	Fr	St. Augustine HS	St. Augustine, FL
G	20	Brian Coffey II	6 ft 1 in (1.85 m)	170 lb (77 kg)	Fr	Shiloh HS	Snellville, GA
G	21	Iván Gandia-Rosa	6 ft 1 in (1.85 m)	185 lb (84 kg)	So	Huntington Prep; College of Central Florida	Caguas, PR
F	22	Trip Day	6 ft 7 in (2.01 m)	205 lb (93 kg)	Fr	Glenwood School (AL)	Columbus, GA
G	50	Benedikt Haid	6 ft 5 in (1.96 m)	190 lb (86 kg)	So	BORG Innsbruck	Innsbruck, Austria
G	55	Chase Driscoll (W)	5 ft 8 in (1.73 m)	200 lb (91 kg)	Sr	Bishop Kenny HS	Jacksonville, FL

Head coach

- Matthew Driscoll (Slippery Rock)

Assistant coach(es)

- Bobby Kennen (Palm Beach Atlantic)
- Bruce Evans (Furman)
- Stephen Perkins (Baylor)

Legend

- (C) Team captain
- (S) Suspended
- (I) Ineligible
- (W) Walk-on
- Injured
- Current redshirt

Roster

== Schedule and results ==
Date time, TV	Rank^{#}	Opponent^{#}	Result	Record	High points	High rebounds	High assists	Site (attendance) city, state
Non-conference regular season
Nov 10, 2017*; 8:00 pm, BTN		at No. 2 Michigan State	L 66–98	0–1	19 – Gandia-Rosa	7 – Aminu	5 – Gandia-Rosa	Breslin Center (14,797); East Lansing, MI
Nov 11, 2017*; 7:30 pm, BTN+		at Michigan; Maui on the Mainland	L 66–86	0–2	17 – Sams	9 – Horchler	3 – Aminu	Crisler Arena (9,916); Ann Arbor, MI
Nov 13, 2017*; 7:00 pm, MASN		at VCU; Maui on the Mainland	L 85–95	0–3	23 – Escobar	12 – Aminu	7 – Gandia-Rosa	Siegel Center (7,637); Richmond, VA
Nov 16, 2017; 7:00 pm, SECN		at No. 8 Florida	L 68–108	0–4	13 – Day	8 – Day	2 – Tied	O'Connell Center (9,151); Gainesville, FL
Nov 18, 2017*; 4:00 pm		vs. Mount St. Mary's; Maui on the Mainland	L 81–84	0–5	16 – Sams	10 – Aminu	6 – Gandia-Rosa	Jerry Richardson Indoor Stadium (300); Spartanburg, SC
Nov 19, 2017*; 2:00 pm, ESPN3		at Wofford; Maui on the Mainland	L 83–86	0–6	21 – Gandia-Rosa	7 – Tied	2 – Tied	Jerry Richardson Indoor Stadium (1,632); Spartanburg, SC
Nov 21, 2017*; 7:00 pm, ESPN3		Edward Waters	W 101–77	1–6	19 – Gandia-Rosa	4 – Day	6 – Gandia-Rosa	UNF Arena (1,843); Jacksonville, FL
Nov 25, 2017*; 4:00 pm, RSN		at No. 11 Miami (FL)	L 65–86	1–7	16 – Escobar	5 – Sams	3 – Gandia-Rosa	Watsco Center (7,189); Coral Gables, FL
Nov 29, 2017*; 7:00 pm, ESPN3		Eastern Michigan	W 84–81 ^{OT}	2–7	20 – Sams	9 – Tied	5 – Gandia-Rosa	UNF Arena (1,589); Jacksonville, FL
Dec 2, 2017*; 7:00 pm, ESPN3		Trinity Baptist	W 85–58	3–7	14 – Gandia-Rosa	14 – Horchier	4 – Gandia-Rosa	UNF Arena (1,526); Jacksonville, FL
Dec 11, 2017*; 7:00 pm		at Florida A&M	W 101–89	4–7	21 – Gandia-Rosa	9 – Horchier	8 – Gandia-Rosa	Alfred Lawson, Jr. Multipurpose Center (1,389); Tallahassee, FL
Dec 13, 2017*; 7:00 pm, ESPN3		FIU	W 87–85	5–7	24 – Gandia-Rosa	14 – Horchier	5 – Gandia-Rosa	UNF Arena (1,479); Jacksonville, FL
Dec 16, 2017*; 8:30 pm, SECN		at Missouri	L 51–85	5–8	13 – Aminu	12 – Horchier	3 – Gandia-Rosa	Mizzou Arena (15,061); Columbia, MO
Dec 19, 2017*; 7:00 pm, ESPN3		at Ball State	W 79–65	5–9	19 – Horchler	13 – Horchler	10 – Gandia-Rosa	Worthen Arena (3,018); Muncie, IN
Dec 22, 2017*; 8:00 pm, SECN+		at LSU	L 52–104	5–10	11 – Day	7 – Horchler	3 – Tied	Maravich Center (8,212); Baton Rouge, LA
Dec 30, 2017*; 4:00 pm, SECN+		at Mississippi State	L 81–109	5–11	17 – Day	4 – Day	7 – Gandia-Rosa	Humphrey Coliseum (7,764); Starkville, MS
Jan 2, 2018*; 7:00 pm, ESPN3		Florida National	W 104–70	6–11	18 – Escobar	13 – Lambright	6 – Tied	UNF Arena (1,181); Jacksonville, FL
Atlantic Sun Conference regular season
Jan 6, 2018; 7:00 pm, ESPN3		Jacksonville	L 86–90	6–12 (0–1)	19 – Day	10 – Horchler	7 – Gandia-Rosa	UNF Arena (2,788); Jacksonville, FL
Jan 11, 2018; 7:00 pm, ESPN3		Lipscomb	W 102–96	7–12 (1–1)	26 – Gandia-Rosa	15 – Horchler	5 – Gandia-Rosa	UNF Arena (1,481); Jacksonville, FL
Jan 13, 2018; 7:00 pm, ESPN3		Kennesaw State	W 85–78	8–12 (2–1)	18 – Day	13 – Horchler	6 – Gandia-Rosa	UNF Arena (1,669); Jacksonville, FL
Jan 18, 2018; 7:00 pm, ESPN3		at NJIT	L 59–91	8–13 (2–2)	12 – Horchler	8 – Horchler	5 – Gandia-Rosa	Wellness and Events Center (555); Newark, NJ
Jan 20, 2018; 2:00 pm, ESPN3		at USC Upstate	W 100–80	9–13 (3–2)	31 – Horchler	12 – Horchler	13 – Gandia-Rosa	G. B. Hodge Center (749); Spartanburg, SC
Jan 24, 2018; 7:00 pm, ESPN3		Florida Gulf Coast	L 87–96	9–14 (3–3)	28 – Escobar	11 – Horchler	10 – Gandia-Rosa	UNF Arena (2,248); Jacksonville, FL
Jan 27, 2018; 4:00 pm, ESPN3		at Stetson	W 73–65	10–14 (4–3)	15 – Gandia-Rosa	16 – Horchler	7 – Gandia-Rosa	Edmunds Center (893); DeLand, FL
Jan 29, 2018; 7:00 pm, ESPN3		at Florida Gulf Coast	L 70–103	10–15 (4–4)	16 – Horchler	10 – Horchler	7 – Gandia-Rosa	Alico Arena (4,016); Fort Myers, FL
Feb 3, 2018; 7:00 pm, ESPN3		Stetson	W 97–91	11–15 (5–4)	20 – Aminu	13 – Aminu	8 – Gandia-Rosa	UNF Arena (2,001); Jacksonville, FL
Feb 8, 2018; 7:00 pm, ESPN3		at Kennesaw State	L 81–89	11–16 (5–5)	22 – Horchler	9 – Aminu	11 – Gandia-Rosa	KSU Convocation Center (1,336); Kennesaw, GA
Feb 10, 2018; 5:00 pm, ESPN3		at Lipscomb	L 75–82	11–17 (5–6)	22 – Day	10 – Horchler	5 – Gandia-Rosa	Allen Arena (1,692); Nashville, TN
Feb 15, 2018; 7:00 pm, ESPN3		USC Upstate	W 109–100	12–17 (6–6)	29 – Aminu	11 – Horchler	18 – Gandia-Rosa	UNF Arena (1,606); Jacksonville, FL
Feb 17, 2018; 7:00 pm, ESPN3		NJIT	W 86–75	13–17 (7–6)	23 – Gandia-Rosa	7 – Horchler	2 – Tied	UNF Arena (2,292); Jacksonville, FL
Feb 22, 2018; 7:00 pm, ESPN3		at Jacksonville	L 81–86	13–18 (7–7)	19 – Sams	9 – Horchler	5 – Gandia-Rosa	Swisher Gymnasium (1,360); Jacksonville, FL
Atlantic Sun tournament
Feb 26, 2018; 7:30 pm, ESPN3	(5)	at (4) NJIT; Quarterfinals	W 80–76	14–18	28 – Sams	9 – Horchler	8 – Gandia-Rosa	Wellness and Events Center (1,235); Newark, NJ
Mar 1, 2018; 7:00 pm, ESPN3	(5)	at (1) Florida Gulf Coast; Semifinals	L 72–95	14–19	22 – Escobar	7 – Aminu	5 – Gandia-Rosa	Alico Arena (3,321); Fort Myers, FL
*Non-conference game. ^{#}Rankings from AP Poll. (#) Tournament seedings in parentheses. All times are in Eastern Time.
