= Ahsan Asadullah =

American basketball player (born 1998)

Personal information
- Born: December 8, 1998 (age 27)
- Listed height: 6 ft 9 in (2.06 m)
- Listed weight: 275 lb (125 kg)

Career information
- High school: North Clayton (College Park, Georgia)
- College: Lipscomb (2018–2023)
- NBA draft: 2023: undrafted
- Position: Center

Career highlights
- 3× First-team All-ASUN (2020–2022); ASUN All-Freshman Team (2019)

Ahsan Asadullah (born December 8, 1998) is an American basketball player. He played in college for the Lipscomb Bisons, where he was a three-time First Team All-ASUN Conference selection.

== Early life ==
Asadullah played basketball for North Clayton High School in College Park, Georgia. As a senior, he averaged 15.1 points and 10 rebounds per game, leading his team to a Region 4-3A runner-up finish. He committed to playing college basketball for Lipscomb over offers from Georgia State, Little Rock, James Madison, Bucknell, Brown and Alcorn State.

== College career ==
Asadullah redshirted his first season at Lipscomb because of a knee injury. As a freshman, he averaged 7.4 points and 4.6 rebounds per game, receiving ASUN Conference All-Freshman Team honors. On March 3, 2020, at the ASUN tournament quarterfinals, Asadullah posted a career-high 40 points and 14 rebounds in a 68–63 win against Florida Gulf Coast. He set the Allen Arena single-game scoring record. As a sophomore, he averaged 18.6 points, 10.1 rebounds and 3.9 assists per game, earning First Team All-ASUN honors. On December 12, 2020, Asadullah recorded a junior season-high 29 points and 11 rebounds in an 81–71 loss to Belmont. As a junior, he averaged 14.1 points, eight rebounds and 3.4 assists per game, repeating as a First Team All-ASUN selection. He led all NCAA Division I centers in assists. Asadullah was named to the First Team All-ASUN for the third season as a senior.

== Career statistics ==
Legend
GP	Games played	GS	Games started	MPG	Minutes per game
FG%	Field goal percentage	3P%	3-point field goal percentage	FT%	Free throw percentage
RPG	Rebounds per game	APG	Assists per game	SPG	Steals per game
BPG	Blocks per game	PPG	Points per game	**Bold**	Career high

=== College ===
Year	Team	GP	GS	MPG	FG%	3P%	FT%	RPG	APG	SPG	BPG	PPG
2017–18	Lipscomb	Redshirt										
2018–19	Lipscomb	**37**	2	14.2	.565	–	**.676**	4.6	.8	.6	.6	7.4
2019–20	Lipscomb	31	30	**29.8**	.520	.200	.519	**10.1**	3.9	**1.2**	**1.2**	**18.6**
2020–21	Lipscomb	27	27	28.3	**.579**	.000	.505	8.0	3.4	.9	.6	14.1
2021–22	Lipscomb	25	24	28.6	.506	**.321**	.635	9.0	**4.6**	.7	1.0	15.2
2022–23	Lipscomb	33	**33**	23.0	.465	.091	.359	5.9	3.2	.7	.8	6.8
Career		153	116	24.1	.526	.236	.550	7.3	3.0	.8	.8	12.0

== Personal life ==
Asadullah's father, Jalal, played college basketball for Akron. His oldest brother, Marcus Georges-Hunt, played for Georgia Tech before embarking on a professional career, including in the NBA. Another older brother, Jalal Johnson, competed for Lindenwood.
