= Sundiata Anderson =

American football player (born 2000)

Profile
- Position: Defensive lineman

Personal information
- Born: July 28, 2000 (age 26); College Park, Georgia, U.S.
- Listed height: 6 ft 4 in (1.93 m)
- Listed weight: 250 lb (113 kg)

Career information
- High school: North Clayton
- College: Grambling State (2018–2023)
- NFL draft: 2024: undrafted

Career history
- Seattle Seahawks (2024)*; Saskatchewan Roughriders (2026)*
- * Offseason or practice squad member only
- Stats at Pro Football Reference

Sundiata Anderson (born July 28, 2000), nicknamed "Sunny", is an American professional football defensive lineman. He played college football for the Grambling State Tigers and was signed by the Seahawks as an undrafted free agent in 2024.

== College career ==
Anderson played college football at Grambling State, where he played in 33 games. He had 136 total tackles, 14 sacks for 116 yards, two pass deflections, four forced fumbles and one block.

== Professional career ==
Pre-draft measurables
| Height | Weight | Arm length | Hand span | 40-yard dash | 10-yard split | 20-yard split | 20-yard shuttle | Three-cone drill | Vertical jump | Broad jump |
|---|---|---|---|---|---|---|---|---|---|---|
| 6 ft 4 in (1.93 m) | 247 lb (112 kg) | 33 7/8 in (0.86 m) | 9 1/2 in (0.24 m) | 4.87 s | 1.71 s | 2.88 s | 4.34 s | 7.32 s | 32.5 in (0.83 m) | 10 ft 1 in (3.07 m) |
All values from Pro Day

=== Seattle Seahawks ===
After going undrafted in the 2024 NFL draft, on May 3, 2024, Anderson signed a 3-year, $2.84 million contract with the Seattle Seahawks. He played in two preseason games, recording two assisted tackles. He was waived on August 27, 2024.

=== Saskatchewan Roughriders ===
On December 15, 2025, Anderson signed with the Saskatchewan Roughriders in the Canadian Football League.

On May 30, 2026, Anderson was released by the Roughriders as part of final roster cuts.
