= 2018 ASUN men's basketball tournament =

- Classification: Division I
- Season: 2017–18
- Teams: 8
- Site: Campus sites
- Champions: Lipscomb (1st title)
- Winning coach: Casey Alexander (1st title)
- MVP: Garrison Mathews (Lipscomb)
- Attendance: 16,590
- Television: ESPN3, ESPN

2017–18 ASUN men's basketball standings
	Conf.				Overall
Team	W		L	PCT	W		L	PCT
Florida Gulf Coast	12	–	2	.857	23	–	12	.657
Lipscomb †	10	–	4	.714	23	–	10	.697
Jacksonville	8	–	6	.571	15	–	18	.455
NJIT	7	–	7	.500	14	–	16	.467
North Florida	7	–	7	.500	14	–	19	.424
Kennesaw State	6	–	8	.429	10	–	20	.333
Stetson	4	–	10	.286	12	–	20	.375
USC Upstate	2	–	12	.143	7	–	25	.219
† 2018 ASUN Tournament winner

The 2018 ASUN men's basketball tournament was the conference postseason tournament for the ASUN Conference. The tournament was the 39th year the league has conducted a postseason tournament. The tournament was held February 26, March 1, and 4, 2018 at campus sites of the higher seeds. Lipscomb defeated regular season champion Florida Gulf Coast in the tournament championship to receive the conference's automatic bid to the NCAA tournament, the school's first trip to the NCAA Tournament.

== Seeds ==
Teams were seeded by record within the conference, with a tiebreaker system to seed teams with identical conference records.

Seed	School	Conference	Tiebreaker
1	Florida Gulf Coast	12–2	
2	Lipscomb	10–4	
3	Jacksonville	8–6	
4	NJIT	7–7	1–1 vs. UNF, 0–2 vs. FGCU, 1–1 vs. LU, 1–1 vs. JU
5	North Florida	7–7	1–1 vs. NJIT, 0–2 vs. FGCU, 1–1 vs. LU, 0–2 vs. JU
6	Kennesaw State	6–8	
7	Stetson	4–10	
8	USC Upstate	2–12	

== Schedule ==
Time	Matchup	Score	Television	Attendance
Quarterfinals – Monday, February 26
7:00 pm	No. 8 USC Upstate at No. 1 Florida Gulf Coast	76–96	ESPN3	2,832
7:30 pm	No. 5 North Florida at No. 4 NJIT	80–76	ESPN3	1,235
7:00 pm	No. 6 Kennesaw State at No. 3 Jacksonville	68–87	ESPN3	725
8:00 pm	No. 7 Stetson at No. 2 Lipscomb	73–89	ESPN3	1,877
Semifinals – Thursday, March 1
7:00 pm	No. 5 North Florida at No. 1 Florida Gulf Coast	72–95	ESPN3	3,321
8:00 pm	No. 3 Jacksonville at No. 2 Lipscomb	62–77	ESPN3	1,967
Final – Sunday, March 4
3:00 pm	No. 2 Lipscomb at No. 1 Florida Gulf Coast	108–96	ESPN	4,633
*Game times in ET. #-Rankings denote tournament seeding.

== Bracket ==
Quarterfinals; February 26; ESPN3
1	Florida Gulf Coast	96
8	USC Upstate	76
4	NJIT	76
5	North Florida	80
2	Lipscomb	89
7	Stetson	73
3	Jacksonville	87
6	Kennesaw State	68

Semifinals; March 1 ESPN3
1	Florida Gulf Coast	95
5	North Florida	72
2	Lipscomb	77
3	Jacksonville	62

Championship; March 4 ESPN
1	Florida Gulf Coast	96
2	Lipscomb	108

== See also ==
- 2017–18 NCAA Division I men's basketball season
- ASUN men's basketball tournament
- 2018 ASUN women's basketball tournament
