= 2017–18 ASUN Conference men's basketball season =

- League: NCAA Division I
- Sport: Basketball
- Teams: 8

Regular season
- Champions: Florida Gulf Coast
- Season MVP: Brandon Goodwin, Florida Gulf Coast

Tournament
- Champions: Lipscomb
- Runners-up: Florida Gulf Coast
- Finals MVP: Garrison Mathews, Lipscomb

Atlantic Sun men's basketball seasons
- ← 2016–17 2018–19 →

2017–18 ASUN men's basketball standings
	Conf.				Overall
Team	W		L	PCT	W		L	PCT
Florida Gulf Coast	12	–	2	.857	23	–	12	.657
Lipscomb †	10	–	4	.714	23	–	10	.697
Jacksonville	8	–	6	.571	15	–	18	.455
NJIT	7	–	7	.500	14	–	16	.467
North Florida	7	–	7	.500	14	–	19	.424
Kennesaw State	6	–	8	.429	10	–	20	.333
Stetson	4	–	10	.286	12	–	20	.375
USC Upstate	2	–	12	.143	7	–	25	.219
† 2018 ASUN Tournament winner

The 2017–18 ASUN Conference men's basketball season with practices in October 2017, followed by the start of the 2017–18 NCAA Division I men's basketball season in November. Conference play began in January 2018 and concluded in February 2018. The season marked the 40th season of ASUN Conference basketball.

Florida Gulf Coast won the regular season championship by two games over Lipscomb. The ASUN tournament was held from February 26 through March 4 at campus sites as top seeds hosted each round. Lipscomb defeated Florida Gulf Coast in the championship game to win the tournament championship. As a result, Lipscomb received the conference's automatic bid to the NCAA tournament. FCGU earned an invite to the NIT.

Lipscomb received the 15th seed in the West Region of the NCAA Tournament and was defeated by the second-seeded North Carolina Tar Heels in the first round. FGCU received the 7th seed in the USC bracket of the NIT and was defeated by the second-seeded Oklahoma State Cowboys in the first round of the tournament.

== Conference matrix ==
	Florida Gulf Coast	Jacksonville	Kennesaw State	Lipscomb	NJIT	North Florida	Stetson	USC Upstate
vs. Florida Gulf Coast	—	0–2	0–2	1–1	0–2	0–2	0–2	1–1
vs. Jacksonville	2–0	—	1–1	2–0	0–1	2–0	0–2	2–0
vs. Kennesaw State	2–0	1–1	—	2–0	0–2	1–1	0–2	1–1
vs. Lipscomb	1–1	0–2	0–2	—	0–2	2–0	0–2	0–1
vs. NJIT	2–0	2–0	2–0	2–0	—	1–1	1–1	1–1
vs. North Florida	2–0	1–1	1–1	0–2	1–1	—	1–1	1–1
vs. Stetson	2–0	2–0	2–0	2–0	1–1	1–1	—	1–1
vs. USC Upstate	1–1	0–2	1–1	2–0	1–1	1–1	1–1	—
Total	12–2	5–9	7–7	11–3	3–11	8–6	3–11	7–7

== Points scored ==
=== Conference regular season ===
Team	For	Against	Difference
Florida Gulf Coast	1092	990	102
Jacksonville	1043	1109	-66
Kennesaw State	1077	1050	27
Lipscomb	1191	1079	112
NJIT	983	1069	-86
North Florida	1114	1082	32
Stetson	1098	1203	-105
USC Upstate	1089	1089	0

Through February 23, 2017

== All-Atlantic Sun Awards ==
Honor	Recipient
Player of the Year	Brandon Goodwin, Florida Gulf Coast
Coach of the Year	Joe Dooley, Florida Gulf Coast
Rookie of the Year	JD Notae, Jacksonville
All-Atlantic Sun First Team	Brandon Goodwin, Florida Gulf Coast
All-Atlantic Sun First Team	Garrison Mathews, Lipscomb
All-Atlantic Sun First Team	Zach Johnson, Florida Gulf Coast
All-Atlantic Sun First Team	Rob Marberry, Lipscomb
All-Atlantic Sun First Team	Anthony Tarke, NJIT
All-Atlantic Sun Second Team	Devin Harris, Jacksonville
All-Atlantic Sun Second Team	Nick Masterson, Kennesaw State
All-Atlantic Sun Second Team	Abdul Lewis, NJIT
All-Atlantic Sun Second Team	Noah Horchler, North Florida
All-Atlantic Sun Second Team	Divine Myles, Stetson
All-Atlantic Sun Freshmen Team	JD Notae, Jacksonville
All-Atlantic Sun Freshmen Team	Zach Cooks, NJIT
All-Atlantic Sun Freshmen Team	Jalyn Hinton, Jacksonville
All-Atlantic Sun Freshmen Team	Abayomi Iyiola, Stetson
All-Atlantic Sun Freshmen Team	Trip Day, North Florida

== Postseason ==
Time	Matchup	Score	Television	Attendance
Quarterfinals – Monday, February 26
7:00 pm	No. 8 USC Upstate at No. 1 Florida Gulf Coast	76–96	ESPN3	2,832
7:30 pm	No. 5 North Florida at No. 4 NJIT	80–76	ESPN3	1,235
7:00 pm	No. 6 Kennesaw State at No. 3 Jacksonville	68–87	ESPN3	725
8:00 pm	No. 7 Stetson at No. 2 Lipscomb	73–89	ESPN3	1,877
Semifinals – Thursday, March 1
7:00 pm	No. 5 North Florida at No. 1 Florida Gulf Coast	72–95	ESPN3	3,321
8:00 pm	No. 3 Jacksonville at No. 2 Lipscomb	62–77	ESPN3	1,967
Final – Sunday, March 4
3:00 pm	No. 2 Lipscomb at No. 1 Florida Gulf Coast	108–96	ESPN	4,633
*Game times in ET. #-Rankings denote tournament seeding.
