= 2017–18 NJIT Highlanders men's basketball team =

American college basketball season

2017–18 NJIT Highlanders men's basketball
- Conference: Atlantic Sun Conference
- Record: 14–16 (7–7 ASUN)
- Head coach: Brian Kennedy (2nd season)
- Assistant coaches: Jeff Rafferty; Stephen Sauers; Kim Waiters
- Home arena: Wellness and Events Center

2017–18 ASUN men's basketball standings
| | Conf. | | | | Overall |
| Team | W | | L | PCT | W | | L | PCT |
|---|---|---|---|---|---|---|---|---|
| Florida Gulf Coast | 12 | – | 2 | .857 | 23 | – | 12 | .657 |
| Lipscomb † | 10 | – | 4 | .714 | 23 | – | 10 | .697 |
| Jacksonville | 8 | – | 6 | .571 | 15 | – | 18 | .455 |
| NJIT | 7 | – | 7 | .500 | 14 | – | 16 | .467 |
| North Florida | 7 | – | 7 | .500 | 14 | – | 19 | .424 |
| Kennesaw State | 6 | – | 8 | .429 | 10 | – | 20 | .333 |
| Stetson | 4 | – | 10 | .286 | 12 | – | 20 | .375 |
| USC Upstate | 2 | – | 12 | .143 | 7 | – | 25 | .219 |
† 2018 ASUN Tournament winner

The 2017–18 NJIT Highlanders men's basketball team represented the New Jersey Institute of Technology during the 2017–18 NCAA Division I men's basketball season. The Highlanders, led by second-year head coach Brian Kennedy, played their home games at the Wellness and Events Center in Newark, New Jersey as members of the Atlantic Sun Conference (ASUN). They finished the season 14–16, 7–7 in ASUN play to finish in a tie for fourth place. They lost in the quarterfinals of the ASUN tournament to North Florida.

The season marked the first season for the Wellness and Events Center, a $110 million athletic center on the school's campus.

== Previous season ==
The Highlanders finished the 2016–17 season 11–20, 3–11 in ASUN play to finish in a tie for seventh place. They lost in the quarterfinals of the ASUN tournament to Lipscomb.

== Offseason ==
=== Departures ===
| Name | Number | Pos. | Height | Weight | Year | Hometown | Reason for departure |
|---|---|---|---|---|---|---|---|
| Tim Coleman | 2 | G | 6'5" | 210 | RS Senior | Union, NJ | Graduated |
| Damon Lynn | 5 | G | 5'11" | 165 | Senior | Hillside, NJ | Graduated |
| James McMillon | 15 | G | 6'1" | 185 | Junior | Newark, NJ | Walk-on; left the team for personal reasons |
| Ron Alston | 21 | G/F | 6'6" | 195 | Freshman | Alexandria, VA | Transferred to Fairmont State |
| Osa Izevbuwa | 23 | G | 6'3" | 230 | Senior | Staten Island, NY | Graduated |
| Rob Ukawuba | 25 | G | 6'4" | 210 | Senior | East Brunswick, NJ | Graduated |

=== Incoming transfers ===
| Name | Number | Pos. | Height | Weight | Year | Hometown | Previous School |
|---|---|---|---|---|---|---|---|
| Diandre Wilson | 15 | G | 6'2" | 170 | Junior | Pompano Beach, FL | Junior college transferred from Mott CC |

=== 2017 recruiting class ===
College recruiting information
| Name | Hometown | School | Height | Weight | Commit date |
|---|---|---|---|---|---|
| David Kachelries #90 PG | Emmaus, PA | Emmaus High School | 6 ft 1 in (1.85 m) | N/A | |
| David Kachelries #90 PG | Recruit ratings: Scout: Rivals: (60) | | | | |
| SanAntonio Brinson; SF | Augusta, GA | South Kent School | 6 ft 8 in (2.03 m) | 195 lb (88 kg) | Oct 14, 2016 |
| SanAntonio Brinson; SF | Recruit ratings: Scout: Rivals: (59) | | | | |
| Shawndale Jones #121 SG | Pittsburgh, PA | The Kiski School | 6 ft 3 in (1.91 m) | N/A | Oct 25, 2016 |
| Shawndale Jones #121 SG | Recruit ratings: Scout: Rivals: (58) | | | | |
| Zach Cooks; PG | Lawrenceville, GA | Berkmar High School | 5 ft 9 in (1.75 m) | 140 lb (64 kg) | Aug 6, 2016 |
| Zach Cooks; PG | Recruit ratings: Scout: Rivals: (NR) | | | | |
Overall recruit ranking:
Note: In many cases, Scout, Rivals, 247Sports, On3, and ESPN may conflict in their listings of height and weight.; In these cases, the average was taken. ESPN grades are on a 100-point scale.; Sources: "2017 Team Ranking". Rivals.

== Roster ==
2017–18 NJIT Highlanders men's basketball team
Players
Coaches

| Pos. | # | Name | Height | Weight | Year | Previous school | Hometown |
|---|---|---|---|---|---|---|---|
| F | 0 | Abdul Lewis | 6 ft 10 in (2.08 m) | 225 lb (102 kg) | RS Jr | Newark East Side; South Alabama | Newark, NJ |
| F | 1 | Taj Price | 6 ft 7 in (2.01 m) | 210 lb (95 kg) | So | Newark East Side | Newark, NJ |
| F | 2 | San Antonio Brinson | 6 ft 8 in (2.03 m) | 200 lb (91 kg) | Fr | Thomson/South Kent School | Augusta, GA |
| G/F | 3 | Chris Jenkins | 6 ft 4 in (1.93 m) | 215 lb (98 kg) | RS Sr | Gill St. Bernard's; Hofstra | Hillside, NJ |
| G | 4 | Zach Cooks | 5 ft 9 in (1.75 m) | 155 lb (70 kg) | Fr | Berkmar | Lawrenceville, GA |
| G | 10 | David Kachelries | 6 ft 1 in (1.85 m) | 160 lb (73 kg) | So | Emmaus | Emmaus, PA |
| G | 11 | Shyquan Gibbs | 6 ft 1 in (1.85 m) | 150 lb (68 kg) | So | St. Anthony | Hillside, NJ |
| G/F | 12 | Anthony Tarke | 6 ft 6 in (1.98 m) | 205 lb (93 kg) | So | Gaithersburg | Gaithersburg, MD |
| G | 14 | Reilly Walsh | 6 ft 3 in (1.91 m) | 180 lb (82 kg) | Jr | St. Peter's Boys | Staten Island, NY |
| G | 15 | Diandre Wilson | 6 ft 2 in (1.88 m) | 170 lb (77 kg) | Jr | Blanche Ely; Mott CC | Fort Lauderdale, FL |
| G | 23 | Shawndale Jones | 6 ft 3 in (1.91 m) | 185 lb (84 kg) | Fr | The Kiski School | Pittsburgh, PA |
| G | 32 | Donovan Greer | 6 ft 3 in (1.91 m) | 165 lb (75 kg) | Jr | Hillcrest Academy; San Jacinto College | Houston, TX |
| F | 34 | Mohamed Bendary | 6 ft 9 in (2.06 m) | 235 lb (107 kg) | So | St. Anthony | Jersey City, NJ |

Head coach

- Brian Kennedy (Monmouth)

Assistant coach(es)

- Jeff Rafferty (Springfield)
- Stephen Sauers (Albany)
- Kim Waiters (Robert Morris)

Legend

- (C) Team captain
- (S) Suspended
- (I) Ineligible
- (W) Walk-on
- Injured
- Current redshirt

Roster

== Schedule and results ==
| Date time, TV | Rank^{#} | Opponent^{#} | Result | Record | High points | High rebounds | High assists | Site (attendance) city, state |
Non-conference regular season
| November 11, 2017*; 6:00 pm, ESPN3 | | Wagner | L 49–60 | 0–1 | 13 – Tarke | 12 – Lewis | 4 – Lewis | Wellness and Events Center (2,907); Newark, NJ |
| November 14, 2017*; 7:00 pm | | Lafayette | W 96–80 | 1–1 | 20 – Wilson | 15 – Lewis | 2 – Tied | Wellness and Events Center (851); Newark, NJ |
| November 18, 2017*; 4:00 pm, FS2 | | at No. 22 Seton Hall | L 53–82 | 1–2 | 10 – Lewis | 5 – Tied | 2 – Lewis | Prudential Center (6,743); Newark, NJ |
| November 22, 2017*; 4:00 pm, ESPN3 | | Kean | W 116–63 | 2–2 | 23 – Jones | 7 – Lewis | 5 – Tied | Wellness and Events Center (200); Newark, NJ |
| November 25, 2017*; 4:00 pm, ESPN3 | | Drexel | W 65–53 | 3–2 | 14 – Walsh | 11 – Lewis | 3 – Tied | Wellness and Events Center (677); Newark, NJ |
| November 28, 2017*; 7:00 pm, ESPN3 | | LIU Brooklyn | W 73–69 | 4–2 | 23 – Lewis | 18 – Lewis | 4 – Lewis | Wellness and Events Center (407); Newark, NJ |
| November 30, 2017*; 7:00 pm, ATTPT | | at No. 19 West Virginia | L 69–102 | 4–3 | 13 – Tarke | 7 – Lewis | 2 – Cooks | WVU Coliseum (8,882); Morgantown, WV |
| December 3, 2017*; 2:00 pm, ESPN3 | | UMass Lowell | W 78–65 | 5–3 | 18 – Tarke | 6 – Tarke | 3 – Tied | Wellness and Events Center; Newark, NJ |
| December 7, 2017*; 7:00 pm, BTN Plus | | at Rutgers | L 64–73 | 5–4 | 19 – Tarke | 12 – Tarke | 3 – Tied | Louis Brown Athletic Center (3,732); Piscataway, NJ |
| December 9, 2017*; 4:00 pm, ESPN3 | | Iona | L 70–74 ^{OT} | 5–5 | 21 – Tarke | 15 – Lewis | 3 – Tied | Wellness and Events Center (460); Newark, NJ |
| December 12, 2017*; 7:00 pm | | at Colgate | L 77–87 | 5–6 | 21 – Tarke | 10 – Lewis | 5 – Tarke | Cotterell Court (377); Hamilton, NY |
| December 16, 2017*; 4:00 pm, ESPN3 | | Fairleigh Dickinson | W 71–68 | 6–6 | 17 – Tied | 8 – Wilson | 3 – Tied | Wellness and Events Center (435); Newark, NJ |
| December 22, 2017*; 2:00 pm, ESPN3 | | Bryn Athyn | W 99–53 | 7–6 | 15 – Wilson | 9 – Brinson | 5 – Cooks | Wellness and Events Center (566); Newark, NJ |
| December 28, 2017*; 7:00 pm, ESPN3 | | at Buffalo | L 81–86 ^{OT} | 7–7 | 23 – Wilson | 9 – Jones | 2 – Tied | Alumni Arena (2,111); Buffalo, NY |
| January 3, 2018*; 7:00 pm, ESPN3 | | at Brown | L 69–70 | 7–8 | 17 – Tarke | 8 – Tied | 6 – Tarke | Pizzitola Sports Center (336); Providence, RI |
Atlantic Sun Conference regular season
| January 6, 2018; 4:00 pm, ESPN3 | | USC Upstate | W 98–87 | 8–8 (1–0) | 21 – Tarke | 7 – Jones | 9 – Bendary | Wellness and Events Center (618); Newark, NJ |
| January 11, 2018; 7:00 pm, ESPN3 | | at Stetson | L 67–80 | 8–9 (1–1) | 23 – Tarke | 6 – Tied | 5 – Cooks | Edmunds Center (398); Deland, FL |
| January 13, 2018; 7:00 pm, ESPN3 | | at Florida Gulf Coast | L 54–68 | 8–10 (1–2) | 12 – Cooks | 8 – Tied | 2 – Tied | Alico Arena (3,517); Fort Myers, FL |
| January 18, 2018; 7:00 pm, ESPN3 | | North Florida | W 91–59 | 9–10 (2–2) | 17 – Wilson | 6 – Tied | 5 – Gibbs | Wellness and Events Center (555); Newark, NJ |
| January 20, 2018; 4:00 pm, ESPN3 | | Jacksonville | L 61–63 | 9–11 (2–3) | 16 – Lewis | 14 – Lewis | 3 – Gibbs | Wellness and Events Center (692); Newark, NJ |
| January 24, 2018; 7:00 pm, ESPN3 | | at Kennesaw State | W 66–60 | 10–11 (3–3) | 27 – Tarke | 9 – Tarke | 4 – Wilson | KSU Convocation Center (1,119); Kennesaw, GA |
| January 27, 2018; 7:00 pm, ESPN3 | | Lipscomb | L 79–86 ^{OT} | 10–12 (3–4) | 20 – Tarke | 9 – Bendary | 3 – Tied | Wellness and Events Center (662); Newark, NJ |
| January 29, 2018; 7:00 pm, ESPN3 | | Kennesaw State | W 74–71 | 11–12 (4–4) | 20 – Lewis | 7 – Tarke | 4 – Gibbs | Wellness and Events Center (593); Newark, NJ |
| February 3, 2018; 5:00 pm, ESPN3 | | at Lipscomb | L 71–77 | 12–12 (5–4) | 27 – Tied | 13 – Lewis | 5 – Lewis | Allen Arena (1,650); Nashville, TN |
| February 8, 2018; 7:00 pm, ESPN3 | | Florida Gulf Coast | L 70–75 | 12–13 (5–5) | 23 – Lewis | 9 – Lewis | 3 – Tied | Wellness and Events Center (661); Newark, NJ |
| February 10, 2018; 4:00 pm, ESPN3 | | Stetson | L 80–84 | 12–14 (5–6) | 21 – Cooks | 13 – Lewis | 4 – Cooks | Wellness and Events Center (788); Newark, NJ |
| February 15, 2018; 7:00 pm, ESPN3 | | at Jacksonville | W 71–69 | 13–14 (6–6) | 18 – Tarke | 8 – Lewis | 3 – Cooks | Swisher Gymnasium (827); Jacksonville, FL |
| February 17, 2018; 7:00 pm, ESPN3 | | at North Florida | L 75–86 | 13–15 (6–7) | 20 – Tied | 11 – Tarke | 5 – Tarke | UNF Arena (2,292); Jacksonville, FL |
| February 22, 2018; 7:00 pm, ESPN3 | | at USC Upstate | W 76–67 | 14–15 (7–7) | 13 – Jones | 11 – Lewis | 4 – Tied | G. B. Hodge Center (833); Spartanburg, SC |
Atlantic Sun tournament
| February 26, 2018; 7:30 pm, ESPN3 | (4) | (5) North Florida; Quarterfinals | L 76–80 | 14–16 | 15 – Brinson | 12 – Lewis | 4 – Gibbs | Wellness and Events Center (1,235); Newark, NJ |
*Non-conference game. ^{#}Rankings from AP Poll. (#) Tournament seedings in parentheses. All times are in Eastern Time.
