= 2021 NBA G League draft =

The 2021 NBA G League draft can refer to either:

- 2021 NBA G League draft (January) – held on January 11, 2021, prior to the delayed start of the 2020–21 NBA G League season
- 2021 NBA G League draft (October) – held on October 23, 2021, prior to the regularly scheduled start of the 2021–22 NBA G League season
