= North Clayton High School =

Public high school located in Clayton County, Georgia, United States

Location
- 1525 Norman Drive; College Park postal address, Georgia 30349; United States; 33°36′33″N 84°26′22″W

Information
- School type: Public high school
- Established: 1937
- School district: Clayton County Public Schools
- Principal: James Scarborough
- Teaching staff: 61.00
- Grades: 9–12
- Enrollment: 1,174 (2023–2024)
- Student to teacher ratio: 19.25
- Colors: Blue and white
- Athletics conference: Georgia High School Association
- Nickname: Eagles
- Website: https://004.clayton.k12.ga.us/

North Clayton High School is a four-year public high school located in unincorporated Clayton County, Georgia, United States, with a College Park postal address. It is part of the Clayton County Public Schools. The school was created in 1937 as Flat Rock School, serving 44 students in grades 8–10 with eight teachers. Grades 11 and 12 were added the following year, and the school was given its current name.

The school's attendance boundary includes the portion of College Park in Clayton County.

North Clayton is one of two high schools in Clayton County that offer the International Baccalaureate Organization program to excelling students. North Clayton has been an IB World School since May 2006. Students receive the IB Diploma Programme after passing a series of vigorous examinations such as IB Math, IB History, and IB foreign languages.

In September 2025, Clayton County Public Schools approved $229 million to build a new campus.

== Testing, graduates and accreditation ==
North Clayton High School's Georgia High School Graduation Test scores have greatly improved over the past few years, particularly in Math and Social Studies. North Clayton's SAT scores have also improved over the last several years. North Clayton's STAR students (one senior student who receives the highest SAT score in all of his/her graduating class selected separately each year) over the previous few years have made some of the highest scores among the other STAR students in the county. North Clayton High has also made AYP (Adequate Yearly Progress).

Graduates of North Clayton have gone on to many notable higher education systems, such as U.S. Air Force Academy, Auburn University, Liberty University, Northeastern University, West Georgia University, Northeastern University, University of North Georgia, Georgia Southern University, Emory University, Georgia College and State University, Georgia Tech (Georgia Institute of Technology), the University of Georgia, Clayton State University, Duke University, Hampton University, Howard University, and North Carolina A & T State University, Florida A&M University, Morehouse College, Spelman College, Tuskegee University, New York University, and the University of Tennessee.

On August 28, 2008, the Southern Association of Colleges and Schools removed its accreditation of the Clayton County Public Schools, citing the district's failure to meet nine mandates it had set that had to be satisfied before September. The SACS cited continuing issues with micromanaging, abuse of power and conflict of interest, among other ethics violations. The loss of accreditation was the first by an American school district since 1969. Students at North Clayton High School and at the other district schools may face difficulties in getting accepted to college and possible loss of eligibility in scholarship programs. Accreditation for Clayton County Public Schools was reinstated in May 2009 by the Southern Association of Colleges and Schools.

== Extracurricular activities ==
The school's chess team won the 1996 Georgia Georgia state championship.

The North Clayton "Mighty Marching" Eagles Band has won numerous first place awards since Howard Carroll became head director in 1996. Some of those awards were from the 2007 Mardi Gras Parade in New Orleans, and the 2007 Howard University Homecoming Parade. At the 2017 Annual Forest Park Christmas Parade, the Eagles were named best overall band. The band is now under the direction of Joseph Daise. The current marching band led by Mr. Joseph Daise has won many events and battles since 2016. Living up to the standard of the directors before, the Marching Eagles are continuing to dominate as a musical force in Clayton County.

== Athletics ==
The boys' track team won the Class B state championship in 1953.

Steve Jett (North Clayton, 1981–83), forward, led his team to the Final Four as a senior with a 20.0 scoring average. He was Clayton Player of the Year, received a scholarship to Southern Mississippi, and was a two-sport star, also playing baseball.

Matt Drummond (North Clayton, 1981–83), guard, assist leader on Final Four team as senior, averaged 14.0 in 1983. He was first team all-county, and a two-sport star, also playing baseball.

Alan Butts (North Clayton) joined the Braves in 1992. He is in uniform for all pre-game workouts, and during the game he assists bullpen coach Marty Reed and the pitchers in the bullpen. A native of Atlanta, Butts attended North Clayton High School and Valdosta State University, where he received a Bachelor of Fine Arts degree in public relations-speech communications. At Valdosta State, he played under legendary coach Tommy Thomas, the winningest baseball coach in Division II history. A highlight of Butts' career came in 2000, when he served on Bobby Cox's All-Star Game coaching staff and pitched in the Home Run Derby competition.

David Pleasants (North Clayton 1981–83) went on to play football in Mississippi and at West Georgia where he was named Academic All-Gulf South Conference Football Team in 1986, and received the Male Academic Athlete of the Year Award in 1987. He joined the coaching staff at LaGrange High School in 1988. A career highlight came in 1991 when the Grangers defeated Colquitt for the State Championship, thus claiming the National Championship spot for that year. After serving 20 years in the Georgia public schools, he assumed the role of Offensive Coordinator/Offensive Line/Academic Coordinator for LaGrange College.

Tom Cantrell is a two-time Georgia All-State shortstop at North Clayton High School. Following his senior season, he began his collegiate career at DeKalb College. At DeKalb, he hit .332 in his freshman year and .362 in his sophomore year, being named All-Region both seasons. At the conclusion of his second year at DeKalb, Cantrell was drafted by the Atlanta Braves in the eighth round of the 1985 MLB Draft. He has continually seen success on the baseball field. In 2017, he led the North Georgia baseball team to its first-ever NCAA Division II Baseball Championship on his way to earning Peach Belt and Southeast Region Coach of the Year. The program earned its first-ever national No. 1 ranking on March 20, 2017.

In 2016, Cantrell was inducted into the Georgia Dugout Club's Baseball Hall of Fame after receiving the club's NCAA Division II Coach of the Year honor for guiding the 2015 Nighthawks to the Peach Belt Conference Championship and an NCAA Southeast Region Runner-up finish.

In his 19 years at North Georgia, Cantrell, who relaunched the baseball program from the ground up in 2000, has formed a consistent winner in Dahlonega with an impressive 16 30-win seasons. During his time at North Georgia, Cantrell has coached 14 All-Americans, 50 All-Conference players, and 52 All-Region players along with seven Gold Glove Award winners. He has also mentored three Players of the Year, four Freshman of the Year, one Pitcher of the Year, and a pair of North Georgia Male Scholar-Athletes of the Year. He currently also serves on the Southeast Region Advisory Committee for baseball.

Mike Martin (North Clayton, 1985–87), 6'3 quarterback, guided North Clayton to an 8–2 regular season in 1986 and the school's first football playoff appearance in 22 years. In the 1986 season, he passed for 1923 yards and 18 touchdowns while rushing for 711 yards and 10 touchdowns. He was the 1986 Clayton County Offensive Player of the Year, and signed as a quarterback with the University of Georgia in 1987.

Karl Miller (North Clayton, 1985–87), 5'10 running back, signed with Georgia Southern in 1987 and was a key player on GSU's 1989 Division I-AA National Championship Team.

Donny Lawrence (North Clayton, 1986–89), 6'4 quarterback, set the State of Georgia passing record for regular season passing yardage with 2292 yards. His main targets were Ozzie Miller and Keenan Walker. Miller caught 52 passes in 1988 for a county-record 1213 yards and 15 touchdowns.

Keenan Walker (North Clayton, 1986–89), 6'1 receiver, signed with Georgia Tech in 1989 and was a key player on Georgia Tech's 1991 national championship team.

DJ Shockley (North Clayton, 1999–2001), 6'1 quarterback, was a 2001 high school Parade All-American and in his senior season passed for 1861 yards and 8 touchdowns while rushing for 864 yards and 8 touchdowns. He signed as a quarterback with the University of Georgia in 2001. He was First-team All SEC in 2005 and was the 2005 SEC Championship MVP. He was drafted in 2006 by the Atlanta Falcons.

In 1993, the boys' basketball team won the Class AA state championship.

The football team has won several championships over the years, including from 1962 to 1964 (Region 2-AA and South Georgia Championships), 1993 (Region 5), 1997 (Region 5-AA) and 2005 (Region 5-AAAA).

The boys' basketball team had an outstanding 2007 season. The team made it to the final four, but was defeated by Tucker 61–56.

The boys' junior varsity baseball team became county champions, following a 16–1 season in 2009.

The baseball had an outstanding season in 2006. The team were defeated in the state playoffs by Jonesboro.

North Clayton has had three athletes make it to the NFL: D.J. Shockley (Atlanta Falcons), Morgan Burnett (Green Bay Packers, Super Bowl Champions 2010) and Amarlo Herrera (Indianapolis Colts).

In 2013–2014, the North Clayton 9th grade boys' basketball team won the championship, finishing 12–1 in the county.

== Notable alumni ==
- 2 Chainz, born Tauheed Epps, rapper and recording artist
- Sundiata Anderson, NFL linebacker for the Seattle Seahawks
- Ahsan Asadullah, college basketball player for the Lipscomb Bisons
- Morgan Burnett, professional football player
- YaYa Diaby, NFL outside linebacker for the Tampa Bay Buccaneers
- Emmanuel Dieke, professional football player
- Marcus Georges-Hunt, professional basketball player
- Amarlo Herrera, professional football player
- Sherrilyn Kenyon, author
- Kyle Love, professional football player
- Monica, R&B singer and actress
- D.J. Shockley, professional football player
- Mariah Stackhouse, professional golfer
- Waka Flocka Flame, born Juaquin Malphurs, rapper/TV personality
- Rasheeda, entrepreneur and rapper/TV personality
