= Wellness and Events Center =

Sports venue in Newark, New Jersey

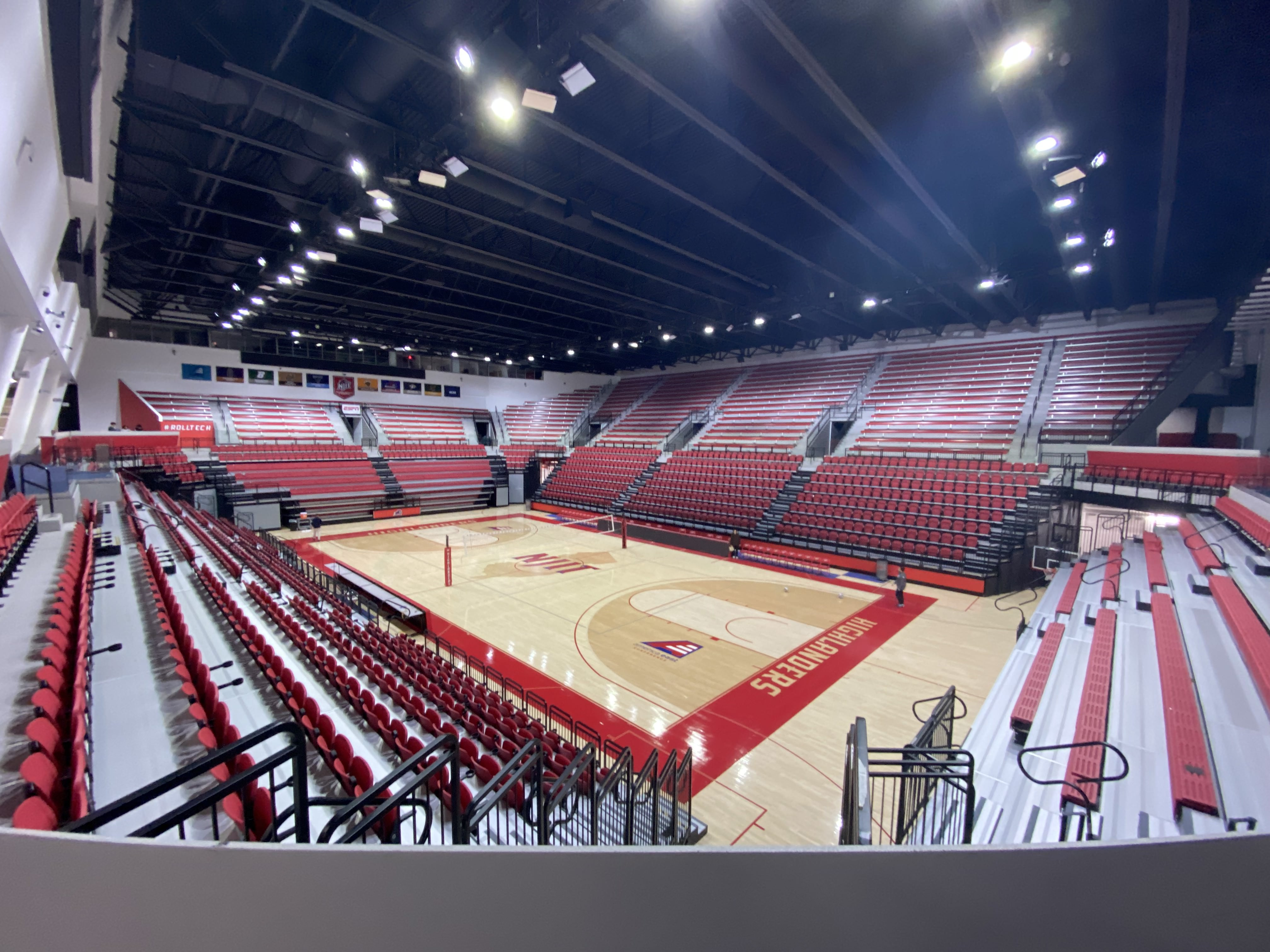
- The WEC in volleyball configuration.
- Interactive map of Wellness and Events Center
- Location: 100 Lock Street, Newark, New Jersey 07102
- Coordinates: 40.7453°N 74.1830°W
- Operator: New Jersey Institute of Technology
- Capacity: 3,500, as sports arena 4,000, as event center
- Field size: 220,000 sq ft (20,000 m^{2})

Construction
- Groundbreaking: November 12, 2015
- Opened: November 10, 2017
- Cost: US$110 million

Tenant
- NJIT Highlanders basketball (2017–18 to present)

The Joel and Diane Bloom Wellness and Events Center (WEC) is a 220,000 sq ft. sports and recreation facility that includes a 3,500 seat basketball arena in Newark, New Jersey. It was built at a cost of $102 million by the New Jersey Institute of Technology. The Wellness and Events Center is the home court of the NCAA Division I American East Conference, NJIT Highlanders. The WEC replaced the former arena of the Highlanders, the Fleisher Center. The new arena broke ground on November 12, 2015, and opened in time for the 2017–18 basketball season.

On October 6, 2023, NJIT renamed the building to the "Joel and Diane Bloom Wellness and Events Center" to honor the contributions of former NJIT president, Joel Bloom.

== See also ==
- List of NCAA Division I basketball arenas
- Sports in Newark, New Jersey
