= 2019 ASUN men's basketball tournament =

Postseason tournament ASUN Conference

- Classification: Division I
- Season: 2018–19
- Teams: 8
- Site: Campus sites
- Champions: Liberty (1st ASUN title)
- Winning coach: Ritchie McKay (1st title)
- MVP: Scottie James (Liberty)
- Top scorer: Garrison Mathews (Lipscomb) (69 points)
- Television: ESPN+, ESPN

2018–19 ASUN men's basketball standings
	Conf.				Overall
Team	W		L	PCT	W		L	PCT
Liberty †	14	–	2	.875	29	–	7	.806
Lipscomb	14	–	2	.875	29	–	8	.784
North Florida	9	–	7	.563	16	–	17	.485
Florida Gulf Coast	9	–	7	.563	14	–	18	.438
NJIT	8	–	8	.500	22	–	13	.629
North Alabama	7	–	9	.438	10	–	22	.313
Jacksonville	5	–	11	.313	12	–	20	.375
Kennesaw State	3	–	13	.188	6	–	26	.188
Stetson	3	–	13	.188	7	–	24	.226
† 2019 ASUN tournament winner

The 2019 ASUN men's basketball tournament was the conference postseason tournament for the ASUN Conference. The tournament was the 40th year the league has conducted a postseason tournament. The tournament was held March 4, 7, and 10, 2019 at campus sites of the higher seeds. Liberty upset top-seeded Lipscomb 74–68 in the championship game to win the tournament, and the conference's automatic bid to the NCAA tournament.

== Seeds ==
Seed	School	Conference	Tiebreaker
1	Lipscomb	14–2	NET Rating 47
2	Liberty	14–2	NET Rating 63
3	North Florida	9–7	1–1 vs. FGCU, 1–3 vs. Lipscomb/Liberty, 1–1 vs. NJIT, 2–0 vs. UNA
4	Florida Gulf Coast	9–7	1–1 vs. UNF, 1–3 vs. Lipscomb/Liberty, 1–1 vs. NJIT, 1–1 vs. UNA
5	NJIT	8–8	
6	North Alabama	7–9	
7	Jacksonville	5–11	
8	Kennesaw State	3–13	1–1 vs. Stetson, 0–4 vs. Lipscomb/Liberty, 1–3 vs. UNF/FGCU, 1–1 vs. NJIT
DNQ	Stetson	3–13	1–1 vs. Kennesaw State, 0–3 vs. Lipscomb/Liberty, 1–3 vs. UNF/FGCU, 0–2 vs. NJIT

Because North Alabama is in the first year of a four-year transition from NCAA Division II to Division I, it will not be eligible to compete in either the NCAA Tournament or the NCAA-operated NIT. Should the Lions win the ASUN tournament final, the ASUN's automatic NCAA Tournament bid goes either to Lipscomb or to Liberty if Liberty advances further than Lipscomb in the A-Sun tournament.

== Schedule ==
Time	Matchup	Score	Television	Attendance
Quarterfinals – Monday, March 4
8:00 pm	No. 8 Kennesaw State at No. 1 Lipscomb	71–86	ESPN+	2,957
7:00 pm	No. 5 NJIT at No. 4 Florida Gulf Coast	83–78	ESPN+	2,289
7:00 pm	No. 6 North Alabama at No. 3 North Florida	66–76	ESPN+	1,924
7:00 pm	No.7 Jacksonville at No. 2 Liberty	58–72	ESPN+	1,738
Semifinals – Thursday, March 7
8:00 pm	No. 5 NJIT at No. 1 Lipscomb	55–78	ESPN+	3,157
7:00 pm	No. 3 North Florida at No. 2 Liberty	63–71	ESPN+	2,319
Final – Sunday, March 10
3:00 p.m.	No. 2 Liberty at No. 1 Lipscomb	74–68	ESPN	5,607
*Game times in ET. #-Rankings denote tournament seeding.

== Bracket ==
Quarterfinals; March 4 ESPN+
1	Lipscomb	86
8	Kennesaw State	71
4	Florida Gulf Coast	78
5	NJIT	83
2	Liberty	72
7	Jacksonville	58
3	North Florida	76
6	North Alabama	66

Semifinals; March 7 ESPN+
1	Lipscomb	78
5	NJIT	55
2	Liberty	71
3	North Florida	63

Championship; March 10; ESPN
1	Lipscomb	68
2	Liberty	74

== See also ==
- 2018–19 NCAA Division I men's basketball season
- ASUN men's basketball tournament
- 2019 ASUN women's basketball tournament
