= 2018–19 ASUN Conference men's basketball season =

- League: NCAA Division I
- Sport: Basketball
- Teams: 8

Regular season
- Champions: Lipscomb & Liberty
- Season MVP: Garrison Mathews, Lipscomb

Tournament
- Champions: Liberty
- Runners-up: Lipscomb
- Finals MVP: Scottie James - Liberty

Atlantic Sun men's basketball seasons
- ← 2017–18 2019–20 →

2018–19 ASUN men's basketball standings
	Conf.				Overall
Team	W		L	PCT	W		L	PCT
Liberty †	14	–	2	.875	29	–	7	.806
Lipscomb	14	–	2	.875	29	–	8	.784
North Florida	9	–	7	.563	16	–	17	.485
Florida Gulf Coast	9	–	7	.563	14	–	18	.438
NJIT	8	–	8	.500	22	–	13	.629
North Alabama	7	–	9	.438	10	–	22	.313
Jacksonville	5	–	11	.313	12	–	20	.375
Kennesaw State	3	–	13	.188	6	–	26	.188
Stetson	3	–	13	.188	7	–	24	.226
† 2019 ASUN tournament winner

The 2018–19 ASUN Conference men's basketball season began with practices in October 2018, followed by the start of the 2018–19 NCAA Division I men's basketball season in November. Conference play began in January 2019 and concluded in March 2019. It was the 41st season of ASUN Conference basketball.

Lipscomb and Liberty tied for the regular season championship and were named co-champions. The ASUN tournament was held March 4–10 at campus sites as top seeds hosted each round.

== Preseason ==
On October 17, 2018, the conference announced its preseason honors and polls.

=== Preseason men's basketball coaches poll ===
(First place votes in parentheses)

1. Lipscomb (7) 79
2. FGCU (1) 66
3. Liberty 63
4. North Florida (1) 61
5. Jacksonville 40
6. NJIT 38
7. Kennesaw State 26
8. Stetson 20
9. North Alabama 12

=== Preseason men's basketball media poll ===
(First place votes in parentheses)

1. Lipscomb (44) 438
2. FGCU (2) 374
3. Liberty 338
4. North Florida (2) 304
5. Jacksonville (2) 254
6. NJIT 203
7. Kennesaw State 147
8. Stetson 121
9. North Alabama 71

=== Honors ===
- Preseason Player of the Year: Garrison Mathews, Lipscomb
- Preseason Defensive Player of the Year: Noah Horchler, North Florida
- Fan-Voted Preseason Player of the Year: Kendall Stafford, North Alabama (640 votes)
- Fan-Voted Preseason Defensive Player of the Year: Reilly Walsh, NJIT (93 votes)

== Conference matrix ==
	Florida Gulf Coast	Jacksonville	Kennesaw State	Liberty	Lipscomb	NJIT	North Alabama	North Florida	Stetson
vs. Florida Gulf Coast	—	0–2	0–2	1–1	0–2	0–2	1-1	0–2	1–1
vs. Jacksonville	2–0	—	0-2	2–0	1–1	2–0	2-0	0–2	2–0
vs. Kennesaw State	2–0	2-0	—	2–0	0–2	1–1	0–2	2-0	1–1
vs. Liberty	0-2	0–2	0–2	—	1-1	0–2	1-1	0–2	0-2
vs. Lipscomb	1-1	0-2	0-2	1-1	—	0-2	0-2	0-2	0-2
vs. NJIT	1-1	0-2	1–1	2-0	2-0	—	1-1	1–1	0-2
vs. North Alabama	1-1	0-2	0–2	2–0	2-0	1–1	—	2-0	1–1
vs. North Florida	1-1	1-1	1-1	2–0	2-0	1–1	1-1	—	0-2
vs. Stetson	1–1	2-0	1–1	2–0	2-0	2-0	1-1	2-0	—
Total	9-7	5–11	3-13	14–2	14-2	8–8	7-9	9-7	3-13

== All-Atlantic Sun awards ==
=== Atlantic Sun men's basketball weekly awards ===
Week	Player of the Week	School	Newcomer of the Week	School
Nov 12	Diandre Wilson	NJIT	Jamari Blackmon	North Alabama
Nov 19	Haanif Cheatham	FGCU	Haanif Cheatham	FGCU
Nov 26	Garrison Mathews; Zach Cooks	Lipscomb; NJIT	Darius McGhee	Liberty
Dec 3	Garrison Mathews (2)	Lipscomb	Darius McGhee (2)	FGCU
Dec 10	Rob Marberry; Zach Cooks (2)	Lipscomb; NJIT	Tyreese Davis	Jacksonville
Dec 17	JD Notae	Jacksonville	Schadrac Casimir	FGCU
Dec 23	Garrison Mathews (3)	Lipscomb	Zach Scott	FGCU
Jan 1	Caleb Homesley	Liberty	Darius McGhee (3)	Liberty
Jan 7	Noah Horchler	North Florida	Darius McGhee (4)	Liberty
Jan 14	Garrison Mathews (4); Scottie James	Lipscomb; Liberty	Tyreese Davis (2)	Jacksonville
Jan 21	Schadrac Casimir; Christian Agnew	FGCU; North Alabama	Schadrac Casimir (2); Christian Agnew	FGCU; North Alabama
Jan 28	Garrison Mathews (5); Abdul Lewis	Lipscomb; NJIT	Schadrac Casimir (3)	FGCU
Feb 4	Garrison Mathews (6)	Lipscomb	Ashan Asadullah	Lipscomb
Feb 11	Eli Pepper	Lipscomb	Bobby Parker	Kennesaw State
Feb 18	Lovell Cabbil	Liberty	Marques Sumner	Stetson
Feb 25	Wajid Aminu	North Florida	Zach Scott (2)	FGCU
Mar 2	Garrison Mathews (7); Tyler Hooker	Lipscomb; Kennesaw State	Carter Hendricksen	North Florida

== Postseason ==
Time	Matchup	Score	Television	Attendance
Quarterfinals – Monday, March 4
8:00 pm	No. 8 Kennesaw State at No. 1 Lipscomb	71–86	ESPN+	2,957
7:00 pm	No. 5 NJIT at No. 4 Florida Gulf Coast	83–78	ESPN+	2,289
7:00 pm	No. 6 North Alabama at No. 3 North Florida	66–76	ESPN+	1,924
7:00 pm	No.7 Jacksonville at No. 2 Liberty	58–72	ESPN+	1,738
Semifinals – Thursday, March 7
8:00 pm	No. 5 NJIT at No. 1 Lipscomb	55–78	ESPN+	3,157
7:00 pm	No. 3 North Florida at No. 2 Liberty	63–71	ESPN+	2,319
Final – Sunday, March 10
3:00 p.m.	No. 2 Liberty at No. 1 Lipscomb	74–68	ESPN	5,607
*Game times in ET. #-Rankings denote tournament seeding.

Quarterfinals; March 4 ESPN+
1	Lipscomb	86
8	Kennesaw State	71
4	Florida Gulf Coast	78
5	NJIT	83
2	Liberty	72
7	Jacksonville	58
3	North Florida	76
6	North Alabama	66

Semifinals; March 7 ESPN+
1	Lipscomb	78
5	NJIT	55
2	Liberty	71
3	North Florida	63

Championship; March 10; ESPN
1	Lipscomb	68
2	Liberty	74
