= 2018–19 Liberty Flames basketball team =

American college basketball season

2018–19 Liberty Flames basketball

Atlantic Sun regular season co-champions Atlantic Sun tournament champions

NCAA tournament, Second Round
- Conference: ASUN Conference
- Record: 29–7 (14–2 ASUN)
- Head coach: Ritchie McKay (4th (6th overall) season)
- Assistant coaches: Brad Soucie (4th (6th) season); Derek Johnston (1st season); Kevin Anderson (1st season)
- Home arena: Vines Center

2018–19 ASUN men's basketball standings
	Conf.				Overall
Team	W		L	PCT	W		L	PCT
Liberty †	14	–	2	.875	29	–	7	.806
Lipscomb	14	–	2	.875	29	–	8	.784
North Florida	9	–	7	.563	16	–	17	.485
Florida Gulf Coast	9	–	7	.563	14	–	18	.438
NJIT	8	–	8	.500	22	–	13	.629
North Alabama	7	–	9	.438	10	–	22	.313
Jacksonville	5	–	11	.313	12	–	20	.375
Kennesaw State	3	–	13	.188	6	–	26	.188
Stetson	3	–	13	.188	7	–	24	.226
† 2019 ASUN tournament winner

The 2018–19 Liberty Flames men's basketball team represented Liberty University in the 2018–19 NCAA Division I men's basketball season. The team played its home games in Lynchburg, Virginia for the 29th consecutive season at Vines Center, with a capacity of 8,085. The team was led by Ritchie McKay, in his sixth season, but fourth season since his return to the program. They were first-year members of the ASUN Conference. They finished the season 29–7, 14–2 in ASUN play to share the regular season championship with Lipscomb. They defeated Jacksonville, North Florida and Lipscomb to be champions of the ASUN tournament. They received the ASUN's automatic-bid to the NCAA tournament where they defeated Mississippi State in the first round before losing in the second round to Virginia Tech.

== Previous season ==
They were members of the Big South Conference. They finished the season 22–14, 9–9 in Big South play to finish in a four-way tie for fifth place. They defeated Campbell and UNC Asheville to advance to the championship game of the Big South tournament where they lost to Radford. They were invited to the CollegeInsider.com Tournament where they defeated North Carolina A&T in the first round in a game referred to as the Jim Phelan Classic. They received a second round bye and defeated Central Michigan in the quarterfinals before losing in the semifinals to UIC.

== Departures ==
Name	Number	Pos.	Height	Weight	Year	Hometown	Notes
Brody Hicks	14	Guard	6'4"	200	Freshman	Roanoke, Virginia	Transferred
Ryan Hiepler	44	Guard	6'0"	180	Junior	Westlake Village, California	Transferred to Dominican University
Ryan Kemrite	5	Guard	6'4"	200	Senior	Conroe, Texas	Graduated
Ezra Talbert	24	Forward	6'8"	190	Junior	Olathe, Kansas	Graduated

== 2018-19 Newcomers ==
College recruiting information
Name	Hometown	School	Height	Weight	Commit date
Tytist Dean; G	Saint Paul, Minnesota	North High School	6 ft 0 in (1.83 m)	180 lb (82 kg)	
Tytist Dean; G	Recruit ratings: No ratings found				
Keenan Gumbs; F	Cibolo, Texas	Schreiner University	6 ft 5 in (1.96 m)	N/A	
Keenan Gumbs; F	Recruit ratings: No ratings found				
Darius McGhee; G	Roxboro, North Carolina	Blue Ridge School	5 ft 9 in (1.75 m)	N/A	
Darius McGhee; G	Recruit ratings: No ratings found				
Blake Preston; F	Charlotte, North Carolina	Charlotte Christian School	6 ft 9 in (2.06 m)	N/A	
Blake Preston; F	Recruit ratings: No ratings found				
Josh Price; G	Charlotte, North Carolina	Carmel Christian School	6 ft 3 in (1.91 m)	N/A	
Josh Price; G	Recruit ratings: No ratings found				
Overall recruit ranking:
Note: In many cases, Scout, Rivals, 247Sports, On3, and ESPN may conflict in their listings of height and weight.; In these cases, the average was taken. ESPN grades are on a 100-point scale.; Sources: "2018 Team Ranking". Rivals.

== Roster ==
2018–19 Liberty Flames men's basketball team
Players
Coaches

Pos.	#	Name	Height	Weight	Year	Previous school	Hometown
F	0	Myo Baxter-Bell	6 ft 5 in (1.96 m)	255 lb (116 kg)	RS Jr	Chaminade Julieen High School	Dayton, Ohio
G	1	Caleb Homesley	6 ft 6 in (1.98 m)	205 lb (93 kg)	RS Jr	Porter Ridge High School	Indian Trail, North Carolina
G	2	Darius McGhee	5 ft 9 in (1.75 m)	—	Fr	Blue Ridge School	Roxboro, North Carolina
G	3	Lovell Cabbil	6 ft 3 in (1.91 m)	170 lb (77 kg)	Sr	Mansfield Summit High School	Arlington, Texas
G	4	Tytist Dean	6 ft 0 in (1.83 m)	180 lb (82 kg)	Fr	North High School	St. Paul, Minnesota
F	5	Keenan Gumbs	6 ft 5 in (1.96 m)	—	Sr	Schreiner University	Cibolo, Texas
G/F	10	Elijah Cuffee	6 ft 4 in (1.93 m)	185 lb (84 kg)	So	Liberty Christian Academy	Poca, West Virginia
G	11	Georgie Pacheco-Ortiz	6 ft 1 in (1.85 m)	170 lb (77 kg)	Jr	Deep Run High School	Ponce, Puerto Rico
G	15	Zach Farquhar (W)	5 ft 9 in (1.75 m)	160 lb (73 kg)	RS Sr	Sycamore High School	Cincinnati, Ohio
G/F	20	Keegan McDowell	6 ft 6 in (1.98 m)	180 lb (82 kg)	So	Moeller High School	Cincinnati, Ohio
G	25	Josh Price (redshirt)	6 ft 3 in (1.91 m)	—	Fr	Carmel Christian School	Charlotte, North Carolina
F	31	Scottie James	6 ft 8 in (2.03 m)	235 lb (107 kg)	RS Jr	Bradley	Tarpon Springs, Florida
F	32	Blake Preston (redshirt)	6 ft 9 in (2.06 m)	—	Fr	Charlotte Christian School	Charlotte, North Carolina
C	55	Brendan Newton	7 ft 2 in (2.18 m)	235 lb (107 kg)	RS Fr	Faith Christian High	Roanoke, Virginia

Head coach

- Ritchie McKay (Seattle Pacific)

Assistant coach(es)

- Brad Soucie (Christian Heritage)
- Derek Johnston (Alabama-Huntsville)
- Kevin Anderson (Richmond)

Legend

- (C) Team captain
- (S) Suspended
- (I) Ineligible
- (W) Walk-on
- Injured
- Current redshirt

- Roster is subject to change as/if players transfer or leave the program for other reasons.

== Schedule and results ==
Date time, TV	Rank^{#}	Opponent^{#}	Result	Record	High points	High rebounds	High assists	Site (attendance) city, state
Exhibition
Nov 4, 2018*; 3:00 pm		No. 15 Virginia Tech; Hurricane Relief Exhibition	L 70–86		15 – Cuffee	6 – James	4 – Cabbil	Vines Center (4,210); Lynchburg, VA
Non-conference regular season
Nov 8, 2018*; 7:00 pm, ESPN+		Maine Fort Kent	W 89–40	1–0	17 – Cabbil	11 – James	3 – 3 tied	Vines Center (3,002); Lynchburg, VA
Nov 13, 2018*; 8:30 pm, ESPN+		Trevecca Nazarene; Commodore Classic	W 93–40	2–0	15 – James	12 – Homesley	6 – Homesley	Vines Center (2,336); Lynchburg, VA
Nov 16, 2018*; 7:00 pm, ESPN3		at Kent State	W 77–70	3–0	16 – Homesley	9 – James	4 – Tied	MAC Center (2,214); Kent, OH
Nov 19, 2018*; 8:00 pm, SECN		at Vanderbilt; Commodore Classic	L 70–79	3–1	16 – Cabbil	9 – James	3 – Tied	Memorial Gymnasium (8,493); Nashville, TN
Nov 23, 2018*; 2:00 pm, ESPN+		Alcorn State; Commodore Classic	W 76–54	4–1	15 – Cuffee	9 – Tied	4 – Cabbil	Vines Center (1,929); Lynchburg, VA
Nov 25, 2018*; 2:00 pm, ESPN+		Savannah State; Commodore Classic	W 82–56	5–1	15 – McGhee	8 – Homesley	6 – Cabbil	Vines Center (1,943); Lynchburg, VA
Nov 28, 2018*; 7:00 pm		at Navy	W 76–58	6–1	18 – McGhee	7 – Tied	5 – Pacheco-Ortiz	Alumni Hall (489); Annapolis, MD
Dec 1, 2018*; 6:00 pm, ESPN+		Georgia State	W 78–52	7–1	19 – Tied	17 – James	5 – Cuffee	Vines Center (2,966); Lynchburg, VA
Dec 3, 2018*; 6:30 pm, FS2		at Georgetown	L 78–88	7–2	19 – McGhee	4 – James	4 – Gumbs	Capital One Arena (4,011); Washington, D.C.
Dec 11, 2018*; 7:00 pm, ESPN+		South Carolina State	W 79–55	8–2	18 – Pacheco-Ortiz	7 – James	5 – McGhee	Vines Center (1,684); Lynchburg, VA
Dec 15, 2018*; 2:00 pm		Kentucky Christian	W 96–55	9–2	14 – Tied	10 – Homesley	6 – McGhee	Vines Center (2,115); Lynchburg, VA
Dec 18, 2018*; 8:00 pm, SECN+		vs. Alabama; Rocket City Classic	L 75–84	9–3	23 – Homesley	11 – James	5 – Homesley	Von Braun Center (5,781); Huntsville, AL
Dec 21, 2018*; 12:00 pm		vs. Alabama State; St. Pete Shootout semifinals	W 73–55	10–3	14 – Gumbs	7 – Gumbs	2 – 5 tied	McArthur Center (158); St. Petersburg, FL
Dec 22, 2018*; 2:30 pm		vs. Austin Peay; St. Pete Shootout	L 66–75	10–4	15 – Pacheco-Ortiz	11 – James	5 – Cuffee	McArthur Center (202); St. Petersburg, FL
Dec 29, 2018*; 6:00pm, P12N		at UCLA	W 73–58	11–4	21 – Homesley	7 – James	4 – Pacheco-Ortiz	Pauley Pavilion (7,456); Los Angeles, CA
Atlantic Sun Conference regular season
Jan 5, 2019; 7:00pm, ESPN+		at FGCU	W 81–63	12–4 (1–0)	18 – McGhee	6 – Tied	8 – James	Alico Arena (3,517); Fort Myers, FL
Jan 9, 2019; 7:00pm, ESPN+		at Stetson	W 71–53	13–4 (2–0)	15 – James	8 – McGhee	4 – Homesley	Edmunds Center (376); Deland, FL
Jan 12, 2019; 2:00pm, ESPN+		Jacksonville	W 69–53	14–4 (3–0)	18 – James	11 – Homesley	3 – Pacheco-Ortiz	Vines Center (2,963); Lynchburg, VA
Jan 16, 2019; 7:00pm, ESPN+		at Kennesaw State	W 62–41	15–4 (4–0)	12 – Tied	12 – James	5 – Cabbil	KSU Convocation Center (843); Kennesaw, Ga
Jan 19, 2019; 7:00pm, ESPN+		North Florida	W 70–64	16–4 (5–0)	18 – James	7 – Homesley	4 – Tied	Vines Center (4,958); Lynchburg, VA
Jan 21, 2019; 7:00pm, ESPN+		North Alabama	W 72–47	17–4 (6–0)	20 – Cabbil	9 – Homesley	5 – Baxter-Bell	Vines Center (2,716); Lynchburg, VA
Jan 27, 2019; 2:00pm, ESPN+		at Jacksonville	W 69–59	18–4 (7–0)	19 – Homesley	6 – James	4 – Tied	Swisher Gymnasium (718); Jacksonville, FL
Jan 29, 2019; 7:00pm, ESPN+		Lipscomb	L 59–79	18–5 (7–1)	12 – Homesley	6 – Baxter-Bell	2 – Tied	Vines Center (5,053); Lynchburg, VA
Feb 2, 2019; 7:00pm, ESPN+		NJIT	W 77–57	19–5 (8–1)	18 – Pacheco-Ortiz	10 – James	5 – Cabbil	Vines Center (3,782); Lynchburg, VA
Feb 5, 2019; 7:00pm, ESPN+		Stetson	W 57–54	20–5 (9–1)	19 – Cabbil	6 – Homesley	5 – Baxter-Bell	Vines Center (2,244); Lynchburg, VA
Feb 9, 2019; 7:00pm, ESPN+		FGCU	W 74–67	21–5 (10–1)	13 – Homesley	14 – James	4 – Tied	Vines Center (4,400); Lynchburg, VA
Feb 13, 2019; 7:30pm, ESPN+		at Lipscomb	W 74–66	22–5 (11–1)	17 – James	10 – Homesley	3 – Tied	Allen Arena (3,437); Nashville, TN
Feb 16, 2019; 4:00pm, ESPN+		at North Alabama	W 80–70	23–5 (12–1)	30 – Cabbil Jr.	14 – James	4 – Cabbil Jr.	Flowers Hall (967); Florence, AL
Feb 23, 2019; 5:00pm, ESPN+		at North Florida	L 70–75	23–6 (12–2)	18 – Homesley	14 – James	4 – Pacheco-Ortiz	UNF Arena (2,169); Jacksonville, Fl
Feb 26, 2019; 7:00pm, ESPN+		Kennesaw State	W 76–59	24–6 (13–2)	16 – Cuffee	9 – Homesley	6 – Cabbil Jr.	Vines Center (3,376); Lynchburg, VA
Mar 1, 2019; 7:00pm, ESPN+		at NJIT	W 57–51	25–6 (14–2)	19 – James	11 – James	2 – James	Wellness and Events Center (945); Newark, NJ
Atlantic Sun Conference tournament
March 4, 2019; 7:00 pm, ESPN3	(2)	(7) Jacksonville; Quarterfinals	W 72–58	26–6	16 – Pacheco-Ortiz	7 – Homesley	5 – Homesley	Vines Center (1,738); Lynchburg, VA
March 7, 2019; 7:00 pm, ESPN3	(2)	(3) North Florida; Semifinals	W 71–63	27–6	24 – James	9 – James	3 – Homesley	Vines Center (2,319); Lynchburg, VA
March 10, 2019; 3:00 pm, ESPN	(2)	at (1) Lipscomb; Championship	W 74–68	28–6	17 – James	8 – James	8 – Homesley	Allen Arena (5,687); Nashville, TN
NCAA tournament
March 22, 2019*; 7:27 pm, truTV	(12 E)	vs. (5 E) Mississippi State; First Round	W 80–76	29–6	30 – Homesley	6 – James	5 – Cabbil Jr.	SAP Center (12,824); San Jose, CA
March 24, 2019*; 7:10 pm, TBS	(12 E)	vs. (4 E) No. 16 Virginia Tech; Second Round	L 58–67	29–7	15 – McGhee	9 – Homesley	3 – Tied	SAP Center (14,802); San Jose, CA
*Non-conference game. ^{#}Rankings from AP Poll. (#) Tournament seedings in parentheses. E=East. All times are in Eastern Time.
