= 2018–19 Kennesaw State Owls men's basketball team =

American college basketball season

2018–19 Kennesaw State Owls men's basketball
- Conference: Atlantic Sun Conference
- Record: 6–26 (3–13 ASUN)
- Head coach: Al Skinner (4th season)
- Assistant coaches: Michael Cotton; Carlton Owens; Stephen Cox
- Home arena: KSU Convocation Center

2018–19 ASUN men's basketball standings
	Conf.				Overall
Team	W		L	PCT	W		L	PCT
Liberty †	14	–	2	.875	29	–	7	.806
Lipscomb	14	–	2	.875	29	–	8	.784
North Florida	9	–	7	.563	16	–	17	.485
Florida Gulf Coast	9	–	7	.563	14	–	18	.438
NJIT	8	–	8	.500	22	–	13	.629
North Alabama	7	–	9	.438	10	–	22	.313
Jacksonville	5	–	11	.313	12	–	20	.375
Kennesaw State	3	–	13	.188	6	–	26	.188
Stetson	3	–	13	.188	7	–	24	.226
† 2019 ASUN tournament winner

The 2018–19 Kennesaw State Owls men's basketball team represented Kennesaw State University in the 2018–19 NCAA Division I men's basketball season. They played their home games at the KSU Convocation Center in Kennesaw, Georgia and were led by fourth-year head coach Al Skinner. They finished the season 6-26 overall, 3–13 in ASUN play to finish in a tie for 8th place, and due to their tiebreaker over Stetson, they qualified for the conference tournament. As the #8 seed in the ASUN tournament, they lost in the first round to top-seeded Lipscomb 71–86.

On February 21, 2019, Skinner announced his resignation from Kennesaw State effective at the end of the season.

== Previous season ==
The Owls finished the 2017–18 season 10–20, 6–8 in ASUN play to finish in sixth place. They lost in the quarterfinals of the ASUN tournament to Jacksonville.

== Roster ==
2018–19 Kennesaw State Owls men's basketball team
Players
Coaches

Pos.	#	Name	Height	Weight	Year	Previous school	Hometown
G	0	Bobby Parker	6 ft 4 in (1.93 m)	185 lb (84 kg)	Jr	Mineral Area College	Crete, IL
G	2	Danny Lewis	6 ft 4 in (1.93 m)	170 lb (77 kg)	RS Fr	UCF	Atlanta, GA
G	3	Adili Kuerban	6 ft 3 in (1.91 m)	180 lb (82 kg)	Fr	Sierra Canyon School	Santa Clarita, CA
G	4	Tyler Hooker	6 ft 0 in (1.83 m)	150 lb (68 kg)	RS Jr	Moravian Prep	Simpsonville, SC
F	5	Isaac Mbuyamba	6 ft 7 in (2.01 m)	235 lb (107 kg)	Jr	Parkrose HS	Portland, OR
G	11	Kyle Clarke	6 ft 5 in (1.96 m)	200 lb (91 kg)	Sr	Oldsmar Christian School	Daytona Beach, FL
G	13	C.J. Washington	6 ft 3 in (1.91 m)	200 lb (91 kg)	Fr	Tompkins HS	Houston, TX
F	15	Ugo Obineke	6 ft 8 in (2.03 m)	195 lb (88 kg)	Fr	Rowlett HS	Rowlett, TX
F	23	Antonio Spencer	6 ft 10 in (2.08 m)	235 lb (107 kg)	RS Fr	Duncanville HS	Dallas, TX
F	24	Bryson Lockley	6 ft 8 in (2.03 m)	218 lb (99 kg)	RS Jr	Panola College	Houston, TX
F	33	Kosta Jankovic	6 ft 8 in (2.03 m)	210 lb (95 kg)	Sr	Renaissance Academy (Los Angeles)	Belgrade, Serbia
G	35	Markus Smith	6 ft 4 in (1.93 m)	188 lb (85 kg)	So	Brookwood HS	Snellville, GA
F	41	Drew Romich	6 ft 10 in (2.08 m)	240 lb (109 kg)	Jr	Longwood	Marietta, GA
F	45	Pietro Agostini	6 ft 9 in (2.06 m)	225 lb (102 kg)	Fr	Hillcrest Prep Academy	Trieste, Italy

Head coach

- Al Skinner (UMass)

Assistant coach(es)

- Michael Cotton (Boston College)
- Carlton Owens (Rhode Island)
- Stephen Cox (Clayton State)

Legend

- (C) Team captain
- (S) Suspended
- (I) Ineligible
- (W) Walk-on
- Injured
- Current redshirt

Roster
Last update: December 7, 2018

== Schedule and results ==
Date time, TV	Rank^{#}	Opponent^{#}	Result	Record	Site (attendance) city, state
Exhibition
November 1, 2018*; 7:30 pm		Clayton State	W 81–78		KSU Convocation Center (544); Kennesaw, GA
Non-conference regular season
November 7, 2018*; 7:30 pm		Oglethorpe	W 68–57	1–0	KSU Convocation Center (901); Kennesaw, Georgia
November 9, 2018*; 8:00 pm, FSKC		at Kansas State; Paradise Jam campus game	L 41–56	1–1	Bramlage Coliseum (11,021); Manhattan, KS
November 12, 2018*; 7:30 pm, ESPN+		at Samford	L 60–74	1–2	Pete Hanna Center (891); Homewood, AL
November 16, 2018*; 3:00 pm		vs. Missouri; Paradise Jam quarterfinals	L 52–55	1–3	Sports and Fitness Center (522); St. Thomas, VI
November 17, 2018*; 3:00 pm		vs. Old Dominion; Paradise Jam consolation 2nd round	L 47–65	1–4	Sports and Fitness Center (1,253); St. Thomas, VI
November 19, 2018*; 1:00 pm		vs. Eastern Kentucky; Paradise Jam	L 81–100	1–5	Sports and Fitness Center (886); St. Thomas, Virgin Islands
November 24, 2018*; 4:00 pm, ESPN+		Belmont	L 53–91	1–6	KSU Convocation Center (602); Kennesaw, GA
November 27, 2018*; 7:00 pm, SECN+		at Georgia	L 52–78	1–7	Stegeman Coliseum (5,947); Athens, GA
December 1, 2018*; 2:00 pm		Hofstra	L 52–78	1–8	KSU Convocation Center (683); Kennesaw, GA
December 13, 2018*; 5:30 pm, ESPN+		at Gardner–Webb	L 77–81 ^{OT}	1–9	Paul Porter Arena (1,069); Boiling Springs, NC
December 15, 2018*; 4:00 pm, ESPN+		Tennessee Tech	W 73–68	2–9	KSU Convocation Center (1,203); Kennesaw, GA
December 18, 2018*; 7:00 pm, ESPN+		Elon	L 67–76	2–10	KSU Convocation Center (564); Kennesaw, GA
December 20, 2018*; 4:00 pm, ESPN+		Southeastern	W 90–72	3–10	KSU Convocation Center (490); Kennesaw, GA
December 28, 2018*; 4:00 pm, ACCN Extra		at Georgia Tech	W 87–57	3–11	McCamish Pavilion (5,589); Atlanta, GA
January 2, 2019*; 7:00 pm, ESPN+		at Yale	L 65–92	3–12	John J. Lee Amphitheater (784); New Haven, CT
Atlantic Sun Conference regular season
January 5, 2019; 4:00 pm, ESPN+		at NJIT	L 52–72	3–13 (0–1)	Wellness and Events Center (455); Newark, NJ
January 9, 2019; 7:00 pm, ESPN+		Jacksonville	L 70–90	3–14 (0–2)	KSU Convocation Center (814); Kennesaw, GA
January 16, 2019; 7:00 pm, ESPN+		Liberty	L 41–62	3–15 (0–3)	KSU Convocation Center (843); Kennesaw, GA
January 19, 2019; 4:30 pm, ESPN+		Florida Gulf Coast	L 59–72	3–16 (0–4)	KSU Convocation Center (824); Kennesaw, GA
January 21, 2019; 6:30 pm, ESPN+		at Lipscomb	L 57–86	3–17 (0–5)	Allen Arena (1,134); Nashville, TN
January 24, 2019; 6:00 pm, ESPN+		at North Alabama	L 71–76	3–18 (0–6)	Flowers Hall (811); Florence, AL
January 30, 2019; 7:00 pm, ESPN+		North Florida	W 81–64	4–18 (1–6)	KSU Convocation Center (871); Kennesaw, GA
February 2, 2019; 4:00 pm, ESPN+		at Stetson	L 75–92	4–19 (1–7)	Edmunds Center (512); DeLand, FL
February 6, 2019; 7:00 pm, ESPN+		at Jacksonville	L 73–82	4–20 (1–8)	Swisher Gymnasium (296); Jacksonville, FL
February 9, 2019; 4:30 pm, ESPN+		NJIT	W 63–62	5–20 (2–8)	KSU Convocation Center (1,100); Kennesaw, GA
February 13, 2019; 7:00 pm, ESPN+		at North Florida	L 57–80	5–21 (2–9)	UNF Arena (1,568); Jacksonville, FL
February 16, 2019; 4:30 pm, ESPN+		Lipscomb	L 67–83	5–22 (2–10)	KSU Convocation Center (856); Kennesaw, GA
February 20, 2019; 7:00 pm, ESPN+		North Alabama	L 61–76	5–23 (2–11)	KSU Convocation Center (608); Kennesaw, GA
February 23, 2019; 7:00 pm, ESPN+		at Florida Gulf Coast	L 56–78	5–24 (2–12)	Alico Arena (3,522); Fort Myers, FL
February 26, 2019; 7:00 pm, ESPN+		at Liberty	L 59–76	5–25 (2–13)	Vines Center (3,376); Lynchburg, VA
March 1, 2019; 7:00 pm, ESPN+		Stetson	W 83–82	6–25 (3–13)	KSU Convocation Center (771); Kennesaw, GA
Atlantic Sun tournament
March 4, 2019; 8:00 pm, ESPN3	(8)	(1) Lipscomb; Quarterfinals	L 71–86	6–26	Allen Arena (2,957); Nashville, TN
*Non-conference game. ^{#}Rankings from AP Poll. (#) Tournament seedings in parentheses. All times are in Eastern.
