= 2018–19 Florida Gulf Coast Eagles men's basketball team =

American college basketball season

2018–19 Florida Gulf Coast Eagles men's basketball
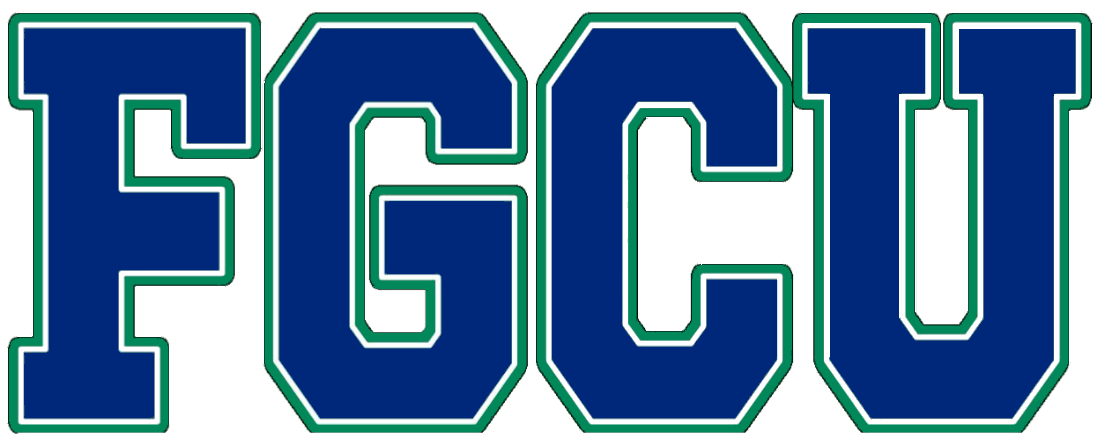
- Conference: Atlantic Sun Conference
- Record: 14–18 (9–7 ASUN)
- Head coach: Michael Fly (1st season)
- Assistant coaches: Donnie Marsh (1st season); Justin Furr (1st season); Joey Cantens (1st season)
- Home arena: Alico Arena

2018–19 ASUN men's basketball standings
	Conf.				Overall
Team	W		L	PCT	W		L	PCT
Liberty †	14	–	2	.875	29	–	7	.806
Lipscomb	14	–	2	.875	29	–	8	.784
North Florida	9	–	7	.563	16	–	17	.485
Florida Gulf Coast	9	–	7	.563	14	–	18	.438
NJIT	8	–	8	.500	22	–	13	.629
North Alabama	7	–	9	.438	10	–	22	.313
Jacksonville	5	–	11	.313	12	–	20	.375
Kennesaw State	3	–	13	.188	6	–	26	.188
Stetson	3	–	13	.188	7	–	24	.226
† 2019 ASUN tournament winner

The 2018–19 Florida Gulf Coast Eagles men's basketball team represented Florida Gulf Coast University in the 2018–19 NCAA Division I men's basketball season. The Eagles were led by first-year head coach Michael Fly and played their home games at Alico Arena in Fort Myers, Florida as members of the Atlantic Sun Conference.

== Previous season ==
The Eagles finished the 2017–18 season 23–12, 12–2 in ASUN play to win the ASUN regular season championship. In the ASUN tournament, they defeated USC Upstate and North Florida to advance to the championship game where they lost to Lipscomb. As a regular season conference champion who failed to win their conference tournament, they received an automatic bid to the National Invitation Tournament where they lost in the first round to Oklahoma State.

On April 4, 2018, head coach Joe Dooley left the school to become the head coach at East Carolina, where he was previously the head coach from 1995 to 1999. The following day, assistant head coach Michael Fly was promoted to head coach.

== Roster ==
2018–19 Florida Gulf Coast Eagles men's basketball team
Players
Coaches

Pos.	#	Name	Height	Weight	Year	Previous school	Hometown
G	0	Decardo Day (S)	6 ft 4 in (1.93 m)	180 lb (82 kg)	Jr	Callaway HS / Southern Utah	Jackson, MS
F	1	Troy Baxter Jr.	6 ft 8 in (2.03 m)	200 lb (91 kg)	RS So	Oldsmar Christian High School / UNLV	Tallahassee, FL
G	2	Caleb Catto	6 ft 5 in (1.96 m)	190 lb (86 kg)	Fr	SW Florida Christian Academy	Cape Coral, FL
G	3	Christian Carlyle	6 ft 6 in (1.98 m)	210 lb (95 kg)	Jr	Bishop Kenny HS	Jacksonville, FL
G	4	Zach Scott	6 ft 4 in (1.93 m)	180 lb (82 kg)	Fr	Westminster Academy	Fort Lauderdale, FL
F	5	RaySean Scott Jr.	6 ft 7 in (2.01 m)	225 lb (102 kg)	Jr	Compton HS	Compton, CA
G	10	Kyle Hoffman (W)	5 ft 9 in (1.75 m)	135 lb (61 kg)	RS So	Lawrence HS / Ottawa University	Lawrence, KS
G	11	Schadrac Casimir	5 ft 10 in (1.78 m)	170 lb (77 kg)	RS Sr	Trinity Catholic HS / Iona	Stamford, CT
F	15	Ricky Doyle (injured)	6 ft 10 in (2.08 m)	240 lb (109 kg)	RS Sr	Bishop Verot HS / Michigan	Cape Coral, FL
F	21	Brady Ernst	6 ft 10 in (2.08 m)	230 lb (104 kg)	RS Jr	Clinton HS / Indian Hills CC	Clinton, IA
G	22	Haanif Cheatham (injured)	6 ft 5 in (1.96 m)	195 lb (88 kg)	RS Sr	Pembroke Pines Charter HS / Marquette	Fort Lauderdale, FL
F	30	Brian Thomas	6 ft 9 in (2.06 m)	255 lb (116 kg)	So	Kell HS	Kennesaw, GA
G	31	Dinero Mercurius	6 ft 4 in (1.93 m)	200 lb (91 kg)	RS Sr	Faith Baptist Christian School / Daytona State	Orlando, FL
G	33	Dolan Mahoney (W)	6 ft 2 in (1.88 m)	185 lb (84 kg)	Sr	IMG Academy	Bradenton, FL
C	55	Ryan Rocuant (W)	6 ft 10 in (2.08 m)	220 lb (100 kg)	RS Fr	Estero HS	Estero, FL
G		Malik Hardy (redshirt)	6 ft 2 in (1.88 m)	187 lb (85 kg)	So	Pembroke Pines Charter HS / Nova Southeastern	Miramar, FL

Head coach

- Michael Fly (Kentucky)

Assistant coach(es)

- Donnie Marsh (Franklin & Marshall)
- Justin Furr (Wingate)
- Joey Cantens (Eckerd)

Legend

- (C) Team captain
- (S) Suspended
- (I) Ineligible
- (W) Walk-on
- Injured
- Current redshirt

Roster
Last update: 2019-02-24

== Schedule and results ==
Date time, TV	Rank^{#}	Opponent^{#}	Result	Record	High points	High rebounds	High assists	Site (attendance) city, state
Non-conference regular season
Nov 6, 2018*; 7:00 pm, ESPN3		at Illinois State	L 66–74	0–1	18 – Casimir	9 – Carlyle	3 – Ernst	Redbird Arena (4,764); Normal, IL
Nov 8, 2018*; 7:00 pm, ESPN+		Southeastern; Gulf Coast Showcase campus game	W 81–54	1–1	16 – Casimir	7 – Ernst	5 – Day	Alico Arena (3,835); Fort Myers, FL
Nov 11, 2018*; 6:00 pm, BTN		at No. 10 Michigan State	L 82–106	1–2	20 – Tied	5 – Tied	7 – Day	Breslin Center (14,797); East Lansing, MI
Nov 16, 2018*; 8:00 pm, ESPN+		South Dakota State	W 84–78	2–2	23 – Cheatham	7 – Carlyle	5 – Carlyle	Alico Arena (3, 725); Fort Myers, FL
Nov 19, 2018*; 7:30 pm		vs. Toledo; Gulf Coast Showcase quarterfinals	L 62–90	2–3	13 – Tied	7 – Cheatham	4 – Casimir	Hertz Arena (1,962); Estero, FL
Nov 20, 2018*; 12:30 pm		vs. Colorado State; Gulf Coast Showcase consolation 2nd round	L 74–82	2–4	18 – Cheatham	6 – Tied	4 – Mercurius	Hertz Arena (1,245); Estero, FL
Nov 21, 2018*; 10:00 am		vs. UTSA; Gulf Coast Showcase 7th place game	L 65–76	2–5	16 – Carlyle	11 – Ernst	4 – Tied	Hertz Arena (976); Estero, FL
Nov 25, 2018*; 3:00 pm		at Florida Atlantic	L 68–85	2–6	20 – Cheatham	5 – Carlyle	4 – Carlyle	FAU Arena (1,013); Boca Raton, FL
Nov 28, 2018*; 7:30 pm, ESPN+		FIU	L 80–81	2–7	15 – Ernst	14 – Scott Jr.	4 – Tied	Alico Arena (2,328); Fort Myers, FL
Dec 2, 2018*; 1:30 pm, ESPN+		Colgate	L 56–74	2–8	13 – Scott	9 – Scott Jr.	3 – Casimir	Alico Arena (2,858); Fort Myers, FL
Dec 5, 2018*; 8:00 pm		at Oral Roberts	W 96–76	3–8	24 – Casimir	8 – Scott Jr.	6 – Day	Mabee Center (1,831); Tulsa, OK
Dec 16, 2018*; 7:00 pm, ESPN+		at UMBC	W 76–53	4–8	14 – Tied	8 – Tied	4 – Tied	UMBC Event Center (1,204); Catonsville, MD
Dec 19, 2018*; 7:30 pm, ESPN+		Keiser	W 87–85	5–8	25 – Scott	12 – Scott Jr.	4 – Tied	Alico Arena (2,835); Fort Myers, FL
Dec 22, 2018*; 5:00 pm, FS2/FSSUN		vs. Florida; Orange Bowl Basketball Classic	L 56–77	5–9	13 – Baxter Jr.	7 – Tied	4 – Catto	BB&T Center (8,914); Sunrise, FL
Dec 29, 2018*; 4:00 pm, SECN		at Ole Miss	L 57–87	5–10	18 – Scott Jr.	9 – Scott Jr.	7 – Day	The Pavilion at Ole Miss (7,551); Oxford, MS
Atlantic Sun Conference regular season
Jan 5, 2019; 7:00 pm, ESPN+		Liberty	L 63–81	5–11 (0–1)	13 – Scott Jr.	7 – Catto	4 – Catto	Alico Arena (3,517); Fort Myers, FL
Jan 8, 2019; 8:00 pm, ESPN+		at North Alabama	L 56–61	5–12 (0–2)	20 – Day	7 – Scott Jr.	1 – Day	Flowers Hall (850); Florence, AL
Jan 12, 2019; 5:00 pm, ESPN+		at North Florida	L 66–87	5–13 (0–3)	21 – Carlyle	6 – Ernst	6 – Day	UNF Arena (2,181); Jacksonville, FL
Jan 19, 2019; 4:30 pm, ESPN+		at Kennesaw State	W 72–59	6–13 (1–3)	34 – Casimir	8 – Thomas	2 – Casimir	KSU Convocation Center (824); Kennesaw, GA
Jan 21, 2019; 7:00 pm, ESPN+		Stetson	W 87–65	7–13 (2–3)	21 – Casimir	7 – Thomas	5 – Day	Alico Arena (3,321); Fort Myers, FL
Jan 24, 2019; 6:30 pm, ESPN+		at Lipscomb	L 81–89	7–14 (2–4)	17 – Mercurius	7 – Scott Jr.	6 – Carlyle	Allen Arena (1,953); Nashville, TN
Jan 27, 2019; 5:00 pm, ESPN+		North Florida	W 88–80	8–14 (3–4)	33 – Casimir	8 – Baxter Jr.	7 – Carlyle	Alico Arena (3,072); Fort Myers, FL
Jan 30, 2019; 7:00 pm, ESPN+		at NJIT	L 54–66	8–15 (3–5)	21 – Baxter Jr.	7 – Casimir	4 – Tied	Wellness and Events Center (520); Newark, NJ
Feb 2, 2019; 7:00 pm, ESPN+		Jacksonville	W 73–60	9–15 (4–5)	18 – Scott	7 – Scott Jr.	3 – Mercurius	Alico Arena (4,009); Fort Myers, FL
Feb 6, 2019; 7:00 pm, ESPN+		North Alabama	W 71–64	10–15 (5–5)	17 – Scott	6 – Scott Jr.	3 – Tied	Alico Arena (3,505); Fort Myers, FL
Feb 9, 2019; 7:00 pm, ESPN+		at Liberty	L 67–74	10–16 (5–6)	33 – Casimir	5 – Casimir	2 – 3 tied	Vines Center (4,400); Lynchburg, VA
Feb 13, 2019; 7:00 pm, ESPN+		NJIT	W 57–55	11–16 (6–6)	15 – Casimir	6 – Mercurius	3 – Carlyle	Alico Arena (3,013); Fort Myers, FL
Feb 16, 2019; 4:00 pm, ESPN+		at Stetson	L 55–67	11–17 (6–7)	13 – Mercurius	7 – Thomas	6 – Casimir	Edmunds Center (701); Deland, FL
Feb 20, 2019; 7:00 pm, ESPN+		Lipscomb	W 67–61	12–17 (7–7)	16 – Mercurius	8 – Scott	2 – 2 tied	Alico Arena (3,508); Fort Myers, FL
Feb 23, 2019; 7:00 pm, ESPN+		Kennesaw State	W 78–56	13–17 (8–7)	16 – Scott	7 – Ernst	6 – Casimir	Alico Arena (3,522); Fort Myers, FL
Mar 1, 2019; 7:00 pm, ESPN+		at Jacksonville	W 77–74	14–17 (9–7)	12 – Mercurius	8 – Thomas	6 – Casimir	Swisher Gymnasium (1,133); Jacksonville, FL
Atlantic Sun tournament
Mar 4, 2019; 7:00 pm, ESPN3	(4)	(5) NJIT; Quarterfinals	L 78–83	14–18	27 – Mercurius	7 – Scott	4 – Catto	Alico Arena; Fort Myers, FL
*Non-conference game. ^{#}Rankings from AP Poll. (#) Tournament seedings in parentheses. All times are in Eastern Time.
