= 2018–19 Lipscomb Bisons men's basketball team =

Lipscomb University in the 2018–19 NCAA Division I men's basketball season

2018–19 Lipscomb Bisons men's basketball

Atlantic Sun regular season co-champions

NIT, Runner-Up
- Conference: Atlantic Sun Conference
- Record: 29–8 (14–2 ASUN)
- Head coach: Casey Alexander (6th season)
- Assistant coaches: Roger Idstrom; Steve Drabyn; Sean Rutigliano
- Home arena: Allen Arena

2018–19 ASUN men's basketball standings
	Conf.				Overall
Team	W		L	PCT	W		L	PCT
Liberty †	14	–	2	.875	29	–	7	.806
Lipscomb	14	–	2	.875	29	–	8	.784
North Florida	9	–	7	.563	16	–	17	.485
Florida Gulf Coast	9	–	7	.563	14	–	18	.438
NJIT	8	–	8	.500	22	–	13	.629
North Alabama	7	–	9	.438	10	–	22	.313
Jacksonville	5	–	11	.313	12	–	20	.375
Kennesaw State	3	–	13	.188	6	–	26	.188
Stetson	3	–	13	.188	7	–	24	.226
† 2019 ASUN tournament winner

The 2018–19 Lipscomb Bisons men's basketball team represented Lipscomb University in the 2018–19 NCAA Division I men's basketball season. They played their home games at the Allen Arena in Nashville, Tennessee and were led by 6th-year head coach Casey Alexander. They finished the season 29–8, 14–2 in ASUN play to finish in a share of the regular season championship with Liberty. They defeated Kennesaw State and NJIT to advance to the championship game where they lost to Liberty. As a regular season conference champion and No. 1 seed in their conference tournament who failed to win their conference tournament, they received an automatic bid to the National Invitation Tournament where they defeated Davidson, UNC Greensboro, NC State, and Wichita State to advance to the championship game where they lost to Texas.

== Previous season ==
The Bisons finished the 2017–18 season 23–10, 10–4 in ASUN play to finish in second place. They defeated Stetson, Jacksonville and Florida Gulf Coast to become champions of the ASUN tournament. They earned the ASUN's automatic bid to the NCAA tournament where they lost in the first round to North Carolina.

== Roster ==
2018–19 Lipscomb Bisons men's basketball team
Players
Coaches

Pos.	#	Name	Height	Weight	Year	Previous school	Hometown
F	0	Rob Marberry	6 ft 7 in (2.01 m)	211 lb (96 kg)	RS Sr	Western Kentucky	Nashville, TN
G	1	Greg Jones	6 ft 3 in (1.91 m)	183 lb (83 kg)	So	Wakeland HS	Frisco, TX
C	2	Ahsan Asadullah	6 ft 9 in (2.06 m)	277 lb (126 kg)	RS Fr	North Clayton HS	Atlanta, GA
G	3	Michael Buckland	6 ft 4 in (1.93 m)	198 lb (90 kg)	Jr	Wesleyan Christian Academy	High Point, NC
F	4	Jaxson Strates	6 ft 8 in (2.03 m)	199 lb (90 kg)	Fr	Lake Highland Prep	Winter Park, FL
G	5	Nathan Moran	5 ft 10 in (1.78 m)	163 lb (74 kg)	Sr	Battle Ground Academy	Franklin, TN
G	10	Jake Wolfe	6 ft 4 in (1.93 m)	190 lb (86 kg)	Fr	Aurora Christian School	Aurora, IL
G	11	Alex Jones	5 ft 9 in (1.75 m)	160 lb (73 kg)	Fr	Buford HS	Buford, GA
F	12	Matt Rose	6 ft 7 in (2.01 m)	197 lb (89 kg)	RS Sr	Samford	Lexington, KY
G	13	Zach Flener	5 ft 10 in (1.78 m)	169 lb (77 kg)	So	Murray HS	Murray, KY
G	15	Andrew Fleming	6 ft 5 in (1.96 m)	197 lb (89 kg)	RS Jr	Chattanooga	Nashville, TN
G	20	John Matt Merritt	6 ft 0 in (1.83 m)	159 lb (72 kg)	So	Lipscomb Academy	Nashville, TN
G	21	Kenny Cooper	6 ft 0 in (1.83 m)	187 lb (85 kg)	Jr	Franklin Road Academy	Nashville, TN
F	22	Eli Pepper	6 ft 8 in (2.03 m)	210 lb (95 kg)	Sr	Caldwell County HS	Princeton, KY
G	24	Garrison Mathews	6 ft 5 in (1.96 m)	204 lb (93 kg)	Sr	Franklin HS	Franklin, TN

Head coach

- Casey Alexander (Belmont)

Assistant coach(es)

- Roger Idstrom (Mars Hill College)
- Steve Drabyn (Belmont)
- Sean Rutigliano (Cortland State)

Legend

- (C) Team captain
- (S) Suspended
- (I) Ineligible
- (W) Walk-on
- Injured
- Current redshirt

Roster
Last update: December 5, 2018

== Schedule and results ==
Date time, TV	Rank^{#}	Opponent^{#}	Result	Record	Site (attendance) city, state
Non-conference regular season
November 6, 2018*; 7:15 pm, ESPN+		Sewanee	W 97–53	1–0	Allen Arena (1,422); Nashville, TN
November 10, 2018*; 3:00 pm, ESPN+		Tennessee State	W 86–79	2–0	Allen Arena (2,596); Nashville, TN
November 15, 2018*; 6:30 pm, ESPN+		Belmont; Battle of the Boulevard	L 83–87	2–1	Allen Arena (2,369); Nashville, TN
November 17, 2018*; 6:00 pm, ESPN3		at SMU	W 79–73	3–1	Moody Coliseum (5,623); University Park, TX
November 20, 2018*; 7:00 pm, FSSW		at No. 18 TCU	W 73–64	4–1	Schollmaier Arena (6,168); Fort Worth, TX
November 25, 2018*; 1:00 pm, ESPN+		at Morehead State	W 87–55	5–1	Ellis Johnson Arena (1,555); Morehead, KY
December 1, 2018*; 5:00 pm		at Middle Tennessee	W 84–74	6–1	Murphy Center (4,574); Murfreesboro, TN
December 4, 2018*; 6:00 pm, ESPN+		at Belmont; Battle of the Boulevard	L 74–76	6–2	Curb Event Center (3,478); Nashville, TN
December 9, 2018*; 1:30 pm, ESPN+		Navy	W 107–81	7–2	Allen Arena (1,446); Nashville, TN
December 12, 2018*; 6:00 pm, ACCRSN		at Louisville	L 68–72	7–3	KFC Yum! Center (14,197); Louisville, KY
December 17, 2018*; 6:30 pm		Covenant	W 119–48	8–3	Allen Arena (1,047); Nashville, TN
December 21, 2018*; 7:15 pm		Vermont	W 91–66	9–3	Allen Arena (1,474); Nashville, TN
December 30, 2018*; 2:00 pm, ACCRSN		at Clemson	L 67–84	9–4	Littlejohn Coliseum (7,879); Clemson, SC
Atlantic Sun Conference regular season
January 5, 2019; 5:00 pm, ESPN+		at Jacksonville	W 77–74	10–4 (1–0)	Swisher Gymnasium (815); Jacksonville, FL
January 9, 2019; 6:30 pm, ESPN+		North Florida	W 81–66	11–4 (2–0)	Allen Arena; Nashville, TN
January 12, 2019; 4:00 pm, ESPN+		Stetson	W 95–71	12–4 (3–0)	Allen Arena (1,388); Nashville, TN
January 16, 2019; 6:00 pm, ESPN+		at NJIT	W 70–52	13–4 (4–0)	Wellness and Events Center (700); Newark, NJ
January 21, 2019; 6:30 pm, ESPN+		Kennesaw State	W 86–57	14–4 (5–0)	Allen Arena (1,134); Nashville, TN
January 24, 2019; 6:30 pm, ESPN+		Florida Gulf Coast	W 89–81	15–4 (6–0)	Allen Arena (1,953); Nashville, TN
January 27, 2019; 3:00 pm, ESPN+		at Stetson	W 88–65	16–4 (7–0)	Edmunds Center (442); DeLand, FL
January 29, 2019; 6:00 pm, ESPN+		at Liberty	W 79–59	17–4 (8–0)	Vines Center (5,053); Lynchburg, VA
February 2, 2019; 4:00 pm, ESPN+		North Alabama	W 102–80	18–4 (9–0)	Allen Arena (3,408); Nashville, TN
February 6, 2019; 6:00 pm, ESPN+		at North Florida	W 92–55	19–4 (10–0)	UNF Arena (1,521); Jacksonville, FL
February 9, 2019; 4:00 pm, ESPN+		Jacksonville	W 86–77	20–4 (11–0)	Allen Arena (2,863); Nashville, TN
February 13, 2019; 6:30 pm, ESPN+		Liberty	L 66–74	20–5 (11–1)	Allen Arena (3,437); Nashville, TN
February 16, 2019; 3:30 pm, ESPN+		at Kennesaw State	W 83–67	21–5 (12–1)	KSU Convocation Center (856); Kennesaw, GA
February 20, 2019; 6:00 pm, ESPN+		at Florida Gulf Coast	L 61–67	21–6 (12–2)	Alico Arena (3,508); Fort Myers, FL
February 26, 2019; 6:30 pm, ESPN+		NJIT	W 81–77	22–6 (13–2)	Allen Arena (1,877); Nashville, TN
March 1, 2019; 6:00 pm, ESPN+		at North Alabama	W 87–75	23–6 (14–2)	Flowers Hall (1,268); Florence, AL
Atlantic Sun tournament
March 4, 2019; 8:00 pm, ESPN3	(1)	(8) Kennesaw State; Quarterfinals	W 86–71	24–6	Allen Arena (2,957); Nashville, TN
March 7, 2019; 8:00 pm, ESPN3	(1)	(5) NJIT; Semifinals	W 78–55	25–6	Allen Arena (3,157); Nashville, TN
March 10, 2019; 3:00 pm, ESPN	(1)	(2) Liberty; Championship	L 68–74	25–7	Allen Arena (5,687); Nashville, TN
NIT
March 19, 2019*; 6:00 pm, ESPN3	(5)	at (4) Davidson; First Round – UNC Greensboro Bracket	W 89–81	26–7	John M. Belk Arena (1,647); Davidson, NC
March 23, 2019*; 1:00 pm, ESPN	(5)	at (1) UNC Greensboro; Second Round – UNC Greensboro Bracket	W 86–69	27–7	Greensboro Coliseum (4,248); Greensboro, NC
March 27, 2019*; 8:00 pm, ESPNU	(5)	at (2) NC State; Quarterfinals – UNC Greensboro Bracket	W 94–93	28–7	Reynolds Coliseum (5,500); Raleigh, NC
April 2, 2019*; 6:00 pm, ESPN	(5)	vs. (6) Wichita State; Semifinals	W 71–64	29–7	Madison Square Garden (4,599); New York City, NY
April 4, 2019*; 6:00 pm, ESPN	(5)	vs. (2) Texas; Championship	L 66–81	29–8	Madison Square Garden (4,051); New York City, NY
*Non-conference game. ^{#}Rankings from AP Poll. (#) Tournament seedings in parentheses. All times are in Central.
