= 2018–19 NJIT Highlanders men's basketball team =

American college basketball season

2018–19 NJIT Highlanders men's basketball

CIT, Quarterfinals
- Conference: Atlantic Sun Conference
- Record: 22–13 (8–8 ASUN)
- Head coach: Brian Kennedy (3rd season)
- Assistant coaches: Jeff Rafferty; Stephen Sauers; Kim Waiters
- Home arena: Wellness and Events Center

2018–19 ASUN men's basketball standings
	Conf.				Overall
Team	W		L	PCT	W		L	PCT
Liberty †	14	–	2	.875	29	–	7	.806
Lipscomb	14	–	2	.875	29	–	8	.784
North Florida	9	–	7	.563	16	–	17	.485
Florida Gulf Coast	9	–	7	.563	14	–	18	.438
NJIT	8	–	8	.500	22	–	13	.629
North Alabama	7	–	9	.438	10	–	22	.313
Jacksonville	5	–	11	.313	12	–	20	.375
Kennesaw State	3	–	13	.188	6	–	26	.188
Stetson	3	–	13	.188	7	–	24	.226
† 2019 ASUN tournament winner

The 2018–19 NJIT Highlanders men's basketball team represented the New Jersey Institute of Technology during the 2018–19 NCAA Division I men's basketball season. The Highlanders, led by third-year head coach Brian Kennedy, played their home games at the Wellness and Events Center in Newark, New Jersey as members of the Atlantic Sun Conference (ASUN). They finished the season 22–13, 8–8 in ASUN play to finish in fifth place. They defeated Florida Gulf Coast in the quarterfinals of the ASUN tournament before losing in the semifinals to Lipscomb. They were invited to the CollegeInsider.com Tournament where they defeated Quinnipiac in the first round before losing in the quarterfinals to Hampton.

== Previous season ==
The Highlanders finished the 2017–18 season 14–16, 7–7 in ASUN play to finish in a tie for fourth place. They lost in the quarterfinals of the ASUN tournament to North Florida.

== Roster ==
2018–19 NJIT Highlanders men's basketball team
Players
Coaches

Pos.	#	Name	Height	Weight	Year	Previous school	Hometown
F	0	Abdul Lewis	6 ft 10 in (2.08 m)	225 lb (102 kg)	RS Sr	Newark East Side HS; South Alabama	Newark, NJ
F	1	Taj Price	6 ft 7 in (2.01 m)	210 lb (95 kg)	Jr	Newark East Side HS	Newark, NJ
F	2	San Antonio Brinson	6 ft 8 in (2.03 m)	200 lb (91 kg)	So	Thomson HS/South Kent School	Augusta, GA
G	4	Zach Cooks	5 ft 9 in (1.75 m)	155 lb (70 kg)	So	Berkmar HS	Lawrenceville, GA
G	5	Diego Willis	6 ft 3 in (1.91 m)	175 lb (79 kg)	Fr	Canarias Basketball Academy	Hermosillo, Mexico
G	11	Shyquan Gibbs	6 ft 1 in (1.85 m)	150 lb (68 kg)	Jr	St. Anthony HS	Hillside, NJ
G	14	Reilly Walsh	6 ft 3 in (1.91 m)	180 lb (82 kg)	Sr	St. Peter's Boys HS	Staten Island, NY
G	15	Diandre Wilson	6 ft 2 in (1.88 m)	170 lb (77 kg)	Sr	Blanche Ely HS; Mott CC	Fort Lauderdale, FL
F	21	Souleymane Diakite	6 ft 9 in (2.06 m)	210 lb (95 kg)	Fr	Blanche Ely HS; Saint Benedict's Prep	Bamako, Mali
G	23	Shawndale Jones	6 ft 3 in (1.91 m)	185 lb (84 kg)	So	The Kiski School	Pittsburgh, PA
G	32	Donovan Greer	6 ft 3 in (1.91 m)	165 lb (75 kg)	Sr	Hillcrest Academy; San Jacinto JC	Houston, TX
F	33	Kjell De Graaf	6 ft 10 in (2.08 m)	210 lb (95 kg)	Fr	Canarias Basketball Academy	Rotterdam, Netherlands
F	34	Mohamed Bendary	6 ft 9 in (2.06 m)	235 lb (107 kg)	Sr	St. Anthony HS	Jersey City, NJ

Head coach

- Brian Kennedy (Monmouth)

Assistant coach(es)

- Jeff Rafferty (Springfield)
- Stephen Sauers (Albany)
- Kim Waiters (Robert Morris)

Legend

- (C) Team captain
- (S) Suspended
- (I) Ineligible
- (W) Walk-on
- Injured
- Current redshirt

Roster
Last update: September 7, 2018

== Schedule and results ==
Date time, TV	Rank^{#}	Opponent^{#}	Result	Record	Site (attendance) city, state
Non-conference regular season
November 6, 2018*; 7:00 pm, ESPN+		Colgate; CNY Hoops Classic	W 81–78 ^{OT}	1–0	Wellness and Events Center (1,339); Newark, NJ
November 9, 2018*; 7:00 pm, ESPN+		at Binghamton; CNY Hoops Classic	W 74–57	2–0	Binghamton University Events Center (2,509); Vestal, NY
November 11, 2018*; 2:00 pm, ESPN+		Brown	W 63–60	3–0	Wellness and Events Center (399); Newark, NJ
November 14, 2018*; 7:00 pm, ESPN+		Kean; CNY Hoops Classic	W 73–40	4–0	Wellness and Events Center (431); Newark, NJ
November 17, 2018*; 4:00 pm, ESPN+		Cornell; CNY Hoops Classic	L 73–86	4–1	Wellness and Events Center (637); Newark, NJ
November 20, 2018*; 7:00 pm		at Wagner	W 71–60	5–1	Spiro Sports Center (1,278); Staten Island, NY
November 24, 2018*; 2:00 pm		at LIU Brooklyn	W 77–70	6–1	Steinberg Wellness Center (397); Brooklyn, NY
November 28, 2018*; 7:00 pm		at Drexel	W 70–67	7–1	Daskalakis Athletic Center (828); Philadelphia, PA
December 1, 2018*; 2:00 pm, ESPN3		at UMass Lowell	L 71–94	7–2	Tsongas Center (1,152); Lowell, MA
December 4, 2018*; 7:00 pm, ESPN+		Army	W 77–72	8–2	Wellness and Events Center (688); Newark, NJ
December 8, 2018*; 4:00 pm, ESPN+		St. Francis Brooklyn	W 82–60	9–2	Wellness and Events Center (525); Newark, NJ
December 11, 2018*; 8:00 pm, ESPN+		at Fordham	W 53–50	10–2	Rose Hill Gymnasium (1,766); Bronx, NY
December 15, 2018*; 7:00 pm		at Fairleigh Dickinson	W 90–80	11–2	Rothman Center (612); Hackensack, NJ
December 29, 2018*; 4:00 pm, ESPN3		at No. 22 Houston	L 59–80	11–3	Fertitta Center (6,180); Houston, TX
December 31, 2018*; 2:00 pm, ESPN+		at Duquesne	W 78–67	12–3	Palumbo Center (1,524); Pittsburgh, PA
Atlantic Sun Conference regular season
January 5, 2019; 4:00 pm, ESPN+		Kennesaw State	W 72–52	13–3 (1–0)	Wellness and Events Center (455); Newark, NJ
January 12, 2019; 4:00 pm, ESPN+		at North Alabama	L 55–61	13–4 (1–1)	Flowers Hall (908); Florence, AL
January 16, 2019; 7:00 pm, ESPN+		Lipscomb	L 52–70	13–5 (1–2)	Wellness and Events Center (700); Newark, NJ
January 19, 2019; 4:00 pm, ESPN+		Jacksonville	W 77–74	14–5 (2–2)	Wellness and Events Center (500); Newark, NJ
January 21, 2019; 7:00 pm, ESPN+		at North Florida	W 76–72	15–5 (3–2)	UNF Arena (1,401); Jacksonville, FL
January 24, 2019; 7:00 pm, ESPN+		at Stetson	W 82–59	16–5 (4–2)	Edmunds Center (515); Deland, FL
January 27, 2019; 4:00 pm, ESPN+		North Alabama	W 76–70 ^{OT}	17–5 (5–2)	Wellness and Events Center (911); Newark, NJ
January 30, 2019; 7:00 pm, ESPN+		Florida Gulf Coast	W 66–54	18–5 (6–2)	Wellness and Events Center (520); Newark, NJ
February 2, 2019; 7:00 pm, ESPN+		at Liberty	L 57–77	18–6 (6–3)	Vines Center (3,782); Lynchburg, VA
February 9, 2019; 4:30 pm, ESPN+		at Kennesaw State	L 62–63	18–7 (6–4)	KSU Convocation Center (1,100); Kennesaw, GA
February 13, 2019; 7:00 pm, ESPN+		at Florida Gulf Coast	L 55–57	18–8 (6–5)	Alico Arena (3,013); Fort Myers, FL
February 16, 2019; 4:00 pm, ESPN+		North Florida	L 63–64	18–9 (6–6)	Wellness and Events Center (554); Newark, NJ
February 20, 2019; 7:00 pm, ESPN+		Stetson	W 82–77	19–9 (7–6)	Wellness and Events Center (227); Newark, NJ
February 23, 2019; 6:00 pm, ESPN+		at Jacksonville	W 77–73	20–9 (8–6)	Swisher Gymnasium (512); Jacksonville, FL
February 25, 2019; 6:30 pm, ESPN+		at Lipscomb	L 77–81	20–10 (8–7)	Allen Arena (1,877); Nashville, TN
March 1, 2019; 7:00 pm, ESPN+		Liberty	L 51–57	20–11 (8–8)	Wellness and Events Center (945); Newark, NJ
Atlantic Sun tournament
March 4, 2019; 7:00 pm, ESPN3	(5)	at (4) Florida Gulf Coast; Quarterfinals	W 83–78	21–11	Alico Arena (2,289); Fort Myers, FL
March 7, 2019; 8:00 pm, ESPN3	(5)	at (1) Lipscomb; Semifinals	L 55–78	21–12	Allen Arena (3,157); Nashville, TN
CollegeInsider.com Postseason tournament
March 18, 2019*; 7:00 pm		Quinnipiac; First round	W 92–81	22–12	Wellness and Events Center (777); Newark, NJ
March 28, 2019*; 8:00 pm		Hampton; Quarterfinals	L 70–82	22–13	Wellness and Events Center (776); Newark, NJ
*Non-conference game. ^{#}Rankings from AP Poll. (#) Tournament seedings in parentheses. All times are in Eastern Time.
