= 2018–19 Stetson Hatters men's basketball team =

American college basketball season

2018–19 Stetson Hatters men's basketball
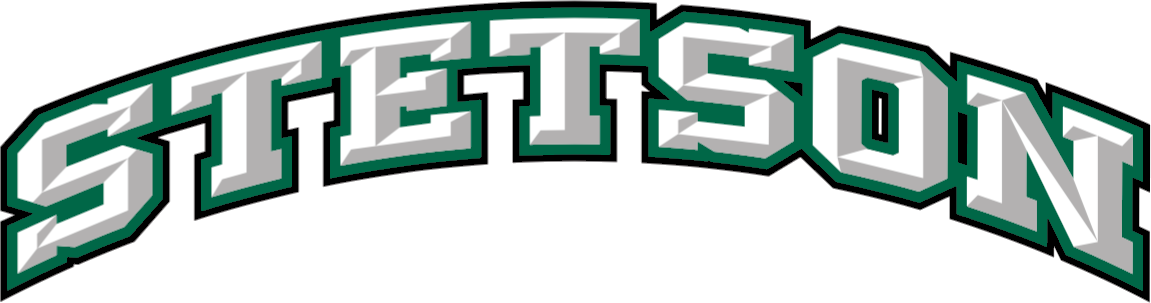
- Conference: Atlantic Sun Conference
- Record: 7–24 (3–13 ASUN)
- Head coach: Corey Williams (6th season)
- Assistant coaches: Bert Capel; Dickey Nutt; Gravelle Craig
- Home arena: Edmunds Center

2018–19 ASUN men's basketball standings
	Conf.				Overall
Team	W		L	PCT	W		L	PCT
Liberty †	14	–	2	.875	29	–	7	.806
Lipscomb	14	–	2	.875	29	–	8	.784
North Florida	9	–	7	.563	16	–	17	.485
Florida Gulf Coast	9	–	7	.563	14	–	18	.438
NJIT	8	–	8	.500	22	–	13	.629
North Alabama	7	–	9	.438	10	–	22	.313
Jacksonville	5	–	11	.313	12	–	20	.375
Kennesaw State	3	–	13	.188	6	–	26	.188
Stetson	3	–	13	.188	7	–	24	.226
† 2019 ASUN tournament winner

The 2018–19 Stetson Hatters men's basketball team represented Stetson University during the 2018–19 NCAA Division I men's basketball season. The Hatters, led by sixth-year head coach Corey Williams, played their home games at the Edmunds Center in DeLand, Florida as members of the Atlantic Sun Conference. They finished the season 7–24 overall, 3–13 in ASUN play to finish in a tie for 8th place, but after tiebreakers, they missed the conference tournament.

Following the conclusion of the season, Stetson fired head coach Corey Williams, who finished his time at Stetson with a six season record of 58 wins and 133 losses.

== Previous season ==
The Hatters finished the 2017–18 season 12–20, 4–10 in ASUN play to finish in seventh place. They lost in the quarterfinals of the ASUN tournament to Lipscomb.

== Roster ==
2018–19 Stetson Hatters men's basketball team
Players
Coaches

Pos.	#	Name	Height	Weight	Year	Previous school	Hometown
G	0	Christian Jones	6 ft 4 in (1.93 m)	175 lb (79 kg)	So	Cardinal Newman HS	Columbia, SC
G/F	1	Keith Matthews	6 ft 7 in (2.01 m)	185 lb (84 kg)	So	Blythewood HS	Blythewood, SC
G	2	Raine McKeython (W)	6 ft 1 in (1.85 m)	185 lb (84 kg)	So	Riverdale Baptist School	Washington, D.C.
G	3	Rex Walters, Jr.	6 ft 3 in (1.91 m)	210 lb (95 kg)	Fr	Spanish River Community HS	Boca Raton, FL
G	4	Jahlil Rawley	6 ft 4 in (1.93 m)	185 lb (84 kg)	Jr	Kestrel Heights HS; Shelton State CC	Durham, NC
G	5	Marques Sumner	6 ft 2 in (1.88 m)	185 lb (84 kg)	Jr	North Augusta HS; USC Salkehatchie	North Augusta, NC
G	10	Kenny Aninye	6 ft 1 in (1.85 m)	185 lb (84 kg)	So	Wheeler HS	Marietta, GA
G	11	Alex Ionesco	6 ft 2 in (1.88 m)	195 lb (88 kg)	Fr	Awty International School	Houston, TX / Paris, France
G	12	Jalen Crutchfield	6 ft 5 in (1.96 m)	190 lb (86 kg)	Fr	Norman North HS	Norman, OK
F	13	Ricardo Lynch	6 ft 7 in (2.01 m)	215 lb (98 kg)	Jr	Boyd H. Anderson HS; SW Miss CC	Fort Lauderdale, FL
F	15	Clay Verk	6 ft 8 in (2.03 m)	260 lb (118 kg)	RS So	ThunderRidge HS	Highlands Ranch, CO
F	21	Ricky Gouety	6 ft 10 in (2.08 m)	210 lb (95 kg)	RS Jr	Victory Christian Academy; Indian Hills CC	Abidjan, Ivory Coast
F	23	Abayomi Iyitola	6 ft 9 in (2.06 m)	210 lb (95 kg)	So	Greenforest Christian Academy	Atlanta, GA
C	32	Adam Webb (W)	7 ft 2 in (2.18 m)	235 lb (107 kg)	So	Lakeland Christian HS	Lakeland, FL
G/F	35	Leo Goodman	6 ft 5 in (1.96 m)	210 lb (95 kg)	Sr	Theodore Roosevelt HS	Saginaw, MI

Head coach

- Corey Williams (Oklahoma State)

Assistant coach(es)

- Bert Capel (Evangel University)
- Dickey Nutt (Oklahoma State)
- Gravelle Craig (Cleveland State)

Legend

- (C) Team captain
- (S) Suspended
- (I) Ineligible
- (W) Walk-on
- Injured
- Current redshirt

Roster
Last update: November 5, 2018

== Schedule and results ==
Date time, TV	Opponent	Result	Record	Site (attendance) city, state
Exhibition
Nov 4, 2018*; 2:00 pm	Trinity (FL)	W 114–45		Edmunds Center; DeLand, FL
Regular season
Nov 7, 2018*; 7:00 pm, ESPN+	Johnson (FL)	W 116–66	1–0	Edmunds Center (386); DeLand, FL
Nov 11, 2018*; 4:00 pm, ESPN3	at Missouri State; CBE Hall of Fame Classic	L 70–83	1–1	JQH Arena (3,879); Springfield, MO
Nov 14, 2018*; 10:00 pm, P12N	at USC; CBE Hall of Fame Classic	L 59–95	1–2	Galen Center (1,533); Los Angeles, CA
Nov 17, 2018*; 5:00 pm	at Southeastern Louisiana; CBE Hall of Fame Classic	L 57–69	1–3	University Center (541); Hammond, LA
Nov 19, 2018*; 7:00 pm, ESPN+	Robert Morris; CBE Hall of Fame Classic	L 72–81	1–4	Edmunds Center (454); DeLand, FL
Nov 23, 2018*; 1:00 pm, ESPN+	VMI	L 79–87 ^{OT}	1–5	Edmunds Center (364); DeLand, FL
Nov 26, 2018*; 7:00 pm	at Bethune–Cookman	L 74–84	1–6	Moore Gymnasium (751); Daytona Beach, FL
Nov 28, 2018*; 7:00 pm, ESPN3	at South Florida	L 71–75	1–7	Yuengling Center (2,415); Tmapa, FL
Dec 1, 2018*; 7:00 pm, ESPN2	at No. 3 Duke	L 49–113	1–8	Cameron Indoor Stadium (9,314); Durham, NC
Dec 5, 2018*; 7:00 pm, ESPN+	Western Illinois	W 68–64	2–8	Edmunds Center (374); DeLand, FL
Dec 8, 2018*; 1:00 pm, ESPN+	Marist	L 75–79	2–9	Edmunds Center (388); DeLand, FL
Dec 16, 2018*; 1:00 p.m., ESPN3	at UCF	L 65–90	2–10	CFE Arena (3,660); Orlando, FL
Dec 18, 2018*; 7:00 pm, ESPN+	UNC Asheville	W 80–74	3–10	Edmunds Center (270); DeLand, FL
Dec 21, 2018*; 17:00 p.m., ESPN+	at Longwood	L 63–77	3–11	Willett Hall (602); Farmville, VA
Jan 3, 2019*; 7:00 pm, ESPN+	Edward Waters	W 72–65	4–11	Edmunds Center (290); DeLand, FL
Atlantic Sun Conference regular season
Jan 9, 2019; 7:00 pm, ESPN+	Liberty	L 53–71	4–12 (0–1)	Edmunds Center (376); DeLand, FL
Jan 12, 2019; 5:00 pm, ESPN+	at Lipscomb	L 71–95	4–13 (0–2)	Allen Arena (1,388); Nashville, TN
Jan 16, 2019; 7:00 pm, ESPN+	North Florida	L 77–87	4–14 (0–3)	Edmunds Center (537); DeLand, FL
Jan 19, 2019; 4:00 pm, ESPN+	at North Alabama	L 62–63	4–15 (0–4)	Flowers Hall (1,251); Florence, AL
Jan 21, 2019; 7:00 pm, ESPN+	at Florida Gulf Coast	L 65–87	4–16 (0–5)	Alico Arena (3,321); Fort Myers, FL
Jan 24, 2019; 7:00 pm, ESPN+	NJIT	L 59–82	4–17 (0–6)	Edmunds Center (515); DeLand, FL
Jan 27, 2019; 4:00 pm, ESPN+	Lipscomb	L 65–88	4–18 (0–7)	Edmunds Center (442); DeLand, FL
Jan 30, 2019; 7:00 pm, ESPN+	at Jacksonville	L 57–72	4–19 (0–8)	Swisher Gymnasium (732); Jacksonville, FL
Feb 2, 2019; 4:00 pm, ESPN+	Kennesaw State	W 92–75	5–19 (1–8)	Edmunds Center (512); DeLand, FL
Feb 5, 2019; 7:00 pm, ESPN+	at Liberty	L 54–57	5–20 (1–9)	Vines Center (2,244); Lynchburg, VA
Feb 13, 2019; 7:00 pm, ESPN+	Jacksonville	L 70–93	5–21 (1–10)	Edmunds Center (362); DeLand, FL
Feb 16, 2019; 4:00 pm, ESPN+	Florida Gulf Coast	W 67–55	6–21 (2–10)	Edmunds Center (701); DeLand, FL
Feb 20, 2019; 7:00 pm, ESPN+	at NJIT	L 77–82	6–22 (2–11)	Wellness and Events Center (227); Newark, NJ
Feb 23, 2019; 4:00 pm, ESPN+	North Alabama	W 63–60	7–22 (3–11)	Edmunds Center (300); DeLand, FL
Feb 26, 2019; 7:00 pm, ESPN+	at North Florida	L 67–77	7–23 (3–12)	UNF Arena (1,421); Jacksonville, FL
Mar 1, 2019; 7:00 pm, ESPN+	at Kennesaw State	L 82–83	7–24 (3–13)	KSU Convocation Center (771); Kennesaw, GA
*Non-conference game. ^{#}Rankings from AP Poll. (#) Tournament seedings in parentheses. All times are in Eastern Time.
