= 2018–19 Jacksonville Dolphins men's basketball team =

American college basketball season

2018–19 Jacksonville Dolphins men's basketball
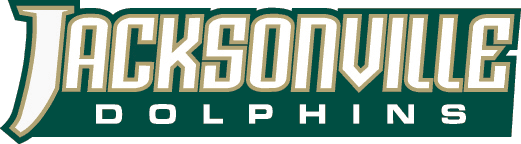
- Conference: Atlantic Sun Conference
- Record: 12–20 (5–11 ASUN)
- Head coach: Tony Jasick (5th season)
- Assistant coaches: Dan Bere'; Chad Eshbaugh; Azeez Ali
- Home arena: Swisher Gymnasium

2018–19 ASUN men's basketball standings
	Conf.				Overall
Team	W		L	PCT	W		L	PCT
Liberty †	14	–	2	.875	29	–	7	.806
Lipscomb	14	–	2	.875	29	–	8	.784
North Florida	9	–	7	.563	16	–	17	.485
Florida Gulf Coast	9	–	7	.563	14	–	18	.438
NJIT	8	–	8	.500	22	–	13	.629
North Alabama	7	–	9	.438	10	–	22	.313
Jacksonville	5	–	11	.313	12	–	20	.375
Kennesaw State	3	–	13	.188	6	–	26	.188
Stetson	3	–	13	.188	7	–	24	.226
† 2019 ASUN tournament winner

The 2018–19 Jacksonville Dolphins men's basketball team represented Jacksonville University during the 2018–19 NCAA Division I men's basketball season. The Dolphins, led by fifth-year head coach Tony Jasick, played their home games at Swisher Gymnasium on the university's Jacksonville, Florida campus as members of the Atlantic Sun Conference.

== Previous season ==
The Dolphins finished the 2017–18 season 15–18, 8–6 in ASUN play to finish in third place. They defeated Kennesaw State in the quarterfinals of the ASUN tournament before losing in the semifinals to Lipscomb.

== Roster ==
2018–19 Jacksonville Dolphins men's basketball team
Players
Coaches

Pos.	#	Name	Height	Weight	Year	Previous school	Hometown
G	0	Tanner Rubio	6 ft 0 in (1.83 m)	185 lb (84 kg)	Jr	The Master's Academy	Maitland, FL
G	1	JD Notae	6 ft 2 in (1.88 m)	185 lb (84 kg)	So	Newton HS	Covington, GA
G	2	Corey Romich	6 ft 4 in (1.93 m)	205 lb (93 kg)	So	Vermont Academy	Groton, MA
C	3	David Bell	6 ft 9 in (2.06 m)	220 lb (100 kg)	RS Jr	Ohio State	Cleveland, OH
G	5	DeAnthony McCallum	6 ft 4 in (1.93 m)	180 lb (82 kg)	Jr	Independence CC	Cincinnati, OH
G	10	Aamahne Santos	5 ft 10 in (1.78 m)	165 lb (75 kg)	RS Jr	Cloud County CC	Dorchester, MA
G	11	Jalyn Hinton	6 ft 5 in (1.96 m)	195 lb (88 kg)	So	Governor's Academy	Boston, MA
G	12	KJ Fitzgerald	5 ft 11 in (1.8 m)	190 lb (86 kg)	Fr	Cardinal Newman HS	West Palm Beach, FL
F	13	Bryce Workman	6 ft 7 in (2.01 m)	240 lb (109 kg)	Fr	Sickles HS	Tampa, FL
F	14	Jace Hogan	6 ft 6 in (1.98 m)	235 lb (107 kg)	RS Sr	Navy	Melbourne, FL
G	15	Quinton Forrest	6 ft 4 in (1.93 m)	220 lb (100 kg)	RS Jr	Bethune–Cookman	Windermere, FL
G/F	21	Derrick Flowers	6 ft 3 in (1.91 m)	200 lb (91 kg)	So	Prestonwood Christian Academy	Frisco, TX
G	22	Lee Richmond	6 ft 1 in (1.85 m)	175 lb (79 kg)	Jr	Christian Brothers College HS	St. Louis, MO
G	23	Tyreese Davis	6 ft 6 in (1.98 m)	200 lb (91 kg)	Fr	Link Prep	St. Louis, MO
F	30	Donovan Forte	6 ft 7 in (2.01 m)	230 lb (104 kg)	Fr	Garfield Heights HS	Cleveland, OH
G	34	Thomas Owen	6 ft 4 in (1.93 m)	180 lb (82 kg)	Fr	St. Francis HS	Dunwoody, GA

Head coach

- Tony Jasick (Mars Hill College)

Assistant coach(es)

- Dan Bere' (Indiana)
- Chad Eshbaugh (Washburn)
- Azeez Ali (Maryland Eastern Shore)

Legend

- (C) Team captain
- (S) Suspended
- (I) Ineligible
- (W) Walk-on
- Injured
- Current redshirt

Roster
Last update: December 7, 2018

== Schedule and results ==
Date time, TV	Rank^{#}	Opponent^{#}	Result	Record	Site (attendance) city, state
Non-conference regular season
Nov 6, 2018*; 7:00 pm, ESPN+		Florida A&M	L 50–65	0–1	Swisher Gymnasium (1,391); Jacksonville, FL
Nov 10, 2018*; 2:00 pm		at Northern Arizona	L 82–97	0–2	Walkup Skydome (630); Flagstaff, AZ
Nov 12, 2018*; 9:00 pm, ESPN3		at Grand Canyon	L 59–76	0–3	GCU Arena (6,572); Phoenix, AZ
Nov 16, 2018*; 4:05 pm		vs. Southeast Missouri State; Goldie and Herman Ungar Classic	L 71–77	0–4	Mitchell Center (1,585); Mobile, AL
Nov 17, 2018*; 7:05 pm		at South Alabama; Goldie and Herman Ungar Classic	W 71–48	1–4	Mitchell Center (1,605); Mobile, AL
Nov 18, 2018*; 3:05 pm		vs. Chattanooga; Goldie and Herman Ungar Classic	W 74–66	2–4	Mitchell Center; Mobile, AL
Nov 21, 2018*; 7:00 pm, ESPN+		Florida Memorial	W 123–77	3–4	Swisher Gymnasium (487); Jacksonville, FL
Nov 24, 2018*; 2:00 pm		at Western Carolina	L 65–77	3–5	Ramsey Center (778); Cullowhee, NC
Dec 1, 2018*; 6:00 pm, ESPN+		South Carolina State	W 71–69	4–5	Swisher Gymnasium (754); Jacksonville, FL
Dec 4, 2018*; 7:00 pm, ESPN+		at Presbyterian	W 94–88	5–5	Templeton Physical Education Center (525); Clinton, SC
Dec 8, 2018*; 6:00 pm, ESPN+		Middle Georgia State	W 100–57	6–5	Swisher Gymnasium (717); Jacksonville, FL
Dec 15, 2018*; 6:00 pm		at Bethune–Cookman	W 79–71	7–5	Moore Gymnasium (617); Daytona Beach, FL
Dec 20, 2018*; 7:00 pm, ACCN Extra		at Notre Dame	L 74–100	7–6	Purcell Pavilion (6,511); South Bend, IN
Dec 22, 2018*; 6:00 pm, BTN		at No. 22 Indiana	L 64–94	7–7	Simon Skjodt Assembly Hall (14,975); Bloomington, IN
Dec 30, 2018*; 2:00 pm, ESPN+		Presbyterian	L 67–72	7–8	Swisher Gymnasium (525); Jacksonville, FL
Atlantic Sun Conference regular season
Jan 5, 2019; 6:00 pm, ESPN+		Lipscomb	L 74–77	7–9 (0–1)	Swisher Gymnasium (815); Jacksonville, FL
Jan 9, 2019; 7:00 pm, ESPN+		at Kennesaw State	W 90–70	8–9 (1–1)	KSU Convocation Center (814); Kennesaw, GA
Jan 12, 2019; 2:00 pm, ESPN+		at Liberty	L 53–69	8–10 (1–2)	Vines Center (2,963); Lynchburg, VA
Jan 16, 2019; 7:00 pm, ESPN+		North Alabama	L 88–91	8–11 (1–3)	Swisher Gymnasium (792); Jacksonville, FL
Jan 19, 2019; 4:00 pm, ESPN+		at NJIT	L 74–77	8–12 (1–4)	Wellness and Events Center (500); Newark, NJ
Jan 24, 2019; 7:00 pm, ESPN+		at North Florida	W 86–81	9–12 (2–4)	UNF Arena (2,658); Jacksonville, FL
Jan 27, 2019; 2:00 pm, ESPN+		Liberty	L 59–69	9–13 (2–5)	Swisher Gymnasium (718); Jacksonville, FL
Jan 30, 2019; 7:00 pm, ESPN+		Stetson	W 72–57	10–13 (3–5)	Swisher Gymnasium (732); Jacksonville, FL
Feb 2, 2019; 7:00 pm, ESPN+		at Florida Gulf Coast	L 60–73	10–14 (3–6)	Alico Arena (4,009); Fort Myers, FL
Feb 6, 2019; 7:00 pm, ESPN+		Kennesaw State	W 82–73	11–14 (4–6)	Swisher Gymnasium (296); Jacksonville, FL
Feb 9, 2019; 5:00 pm, ESPN+		at Lipscomb	L 77–86	11–15 (4–7)	Allen Arena (2,863); Nashville, TN
Feb 13, 2019; 7:00 pm, ESPN+		at Stetson	W 93–70	12–15 (5–7)	Edmunds Center (362); DeLand, FL
Feb 20, 2019; 7:00 pm, ESPN+		North Florida	L 73–80	12–16 (5–8)	Swisher Gymnasium (1,500); Jacksonville, FL
Feb 23, 2019; 6:00 pm, ESPN+		NJIT	L 73–77	12–17 (5–9)	Swisher Gymnasium (512); Jacksonville, FL
Feb 26, 2019; 7:00 pm, ESPN+		at North Alabama	L 55–69	12–18 (5–10)	Flowers Hall (1,112); Florence, AL
Mar 1, 2019; 7:00 pm, ESPN+		Florida Gulf Coast	L 74–77	12–19 (5–11)	Swisher Gymnasium (1,133); Jacksonville, FL
Atlantic Sun tournament
March 4, 2019; 7:00 pm, ESPN3	(7)	(2) Liberty; Quarterfinals	L 58–72	12–20	Vines Center (1,738); Lynchburg, VA
*Non-conference game. ^{#}Rankings from AP Poll. (#) Tournament seedings in parentheses. All times are in Eastern Time.
