= 2018–19 North Alabama Lions men's basketball team =

American college basketball season

2018–19 North Alabama Lions men's basketball
- Conference: Atlantic Sun Conference
- Record: 10–22 (7–9 ASUN)
- Head coach: Tony Pujol (1st season)
- Assistant coaches: Willie Watson; Tom Berryman; Ahmad Smith
- Home arena: Flowers Hall

2018–19 ASUN men's basketball standings
	Conf.				Overall
Team	W		L	PCT	W		L	PCT
Liberty †	14	–	2	.875	29	–	7	.806
Lipscomb	14	–	2	.875	29	–	8	.784
North Florida	9	–	7	.563	16	–	17	.485
Florida Gulf Coast	9	–	7	.563	14	–	18	.438
NJIT	8	–	8	.500	22	–	13	.629
North Alabama	7	–	9	.438	10	–	22	.313
Jacksonville	5	–	11	.313	12	–	20	.375
Kennesaw State	3	–	13	.188	6	–	26	.188
Stetson	3	–	13	.188	7	–	24	.226
† 2019 ASUN tournament winner

The 2018–19 North Alabama Lions men's basketball team represented the University of North Alabama during the 2018–19 NCAA Division I men's basketball season. They were led by head coach Tony Pujol in his first season at North Alabama. The Lions played their home games at the Flowers Hall in Florence, Alabama as first-time members of the Atlantic Sun Conference.

This season marked North Alabama's first of a four-year transition period from Division II to Division I. As a result, the Lions were not eligible for NCAA postseason play but could participate in the ASUN tournament. They could also play in the CIT or CBI if invited.

== Previous season ==
The Lions finished the 2017–18 season 15–13 overall, and 10–10 record in Gulf South Conference play, trying for sixth place. They lost in the first round of the Gulf South tournament, losing to West Florida. The 2017–18 season was the Lion's last season in Division II and the Gulf South Conference.

== Offseason ==
=== Incoming recruits ===
US college sports recruiting information for high school athletes
Name	Position	Hometown	Height	Weight	Commit/sign sate
Jamari Blackmon	PG	Hoover, AL	6'0"	170	6/20/2018
Christian Agnew	SG	Detroit, MI	6'2"	175	2/9/18
Aleksa Matic	CG	Belgrade, Serbia	6'4"	198	6/20/18
Sean Elmore	SG	Mountain Brook, AL	6'2"	175	10/24/17
Andrew Morrissey	PF	Winnebago, IL	6'9	235	6/20/18
Cantavio Dutreil	PF	Gonaïves, Haiti	6'7	205	6/20/18
Emanuel Littles	PF	Lanett, AL	6'8	200	1/5/17

== Roster ==
2018–19 North Alabama Lions men's basketball team
Players
Coaches

Pos.	#	Name	Height	Weight	Year	Previous school	Hometown
G	1	Tavon King	6 ft 0 in (1.83 m)	170 lb (77 kg)	So	Halls HS/Columbia State CC	Gates, TN
G	2	Christian Agnew	6 ft 2 in (1.88 m)	175 lb (79 kg)	Fr	John Glenn HS	Detroit, MI
G	3	Jamari Blackmon	6 ft 0 in (1.83 m)	170 lb (77 kg)	Fr	Hoover HS	Hoover, AL
F	4	Logan Windeler	6 ft 9 in (2.06 m)	195 lb (88 kg)	Fr	Victory Rock Prep (FL)	Manteno, IL
F	5	Cantavio Dutreil	6 ft 7 in (2.01 m)	205 lb (93 kg)	Fr	Trinity Catholic HS	Gonaïves, Haiti
G	10	Aleks Matic	6 ft 4 in (1.93 m)	198 lb (90 kg)	Fr	Sportksa Gimnazija	Belgrade, Serbia
G	11	Kedarius Smith	5 ft 10 in (1.78 m)	165 lb (75 kg)	Sr	Velma Jackson HS/Northeast Mississippi CC	Camden, MS
F	14	Payton Youngblood	6 ft 5 in (1.96 m)	195 lb (88 kg)	Jr	Oak Mountain HS/Snead State CC	Birmingham, AL
F	15	Cameron Diggs	6 ft 9 in (2.06 m)	225 lb (102 kg)	Jr	Mattie T. Blount HS/East Central CC	Mobile, AL
F	21	Emanuel Littles	6 ft 8 in (2.03 m)	200 lb (91 kg)	Fr	Lanett HS	Lanett, AL
G	23	Sean Elmore	6 ft 2 in (1.88 m)	175 lb (79 kg)	Fr	Mountain Brook HS	Birmingham, AL
G/F	24	Kendall Stafford	6 ft 4 in (1.93 m)	215 lb (98 kg)	Sr	Corinth HS/Northeast Mississippi CC	Corinth, MS
F	53	Andrew Morrissey	6 ft 9 in (2.06 m)	235 lb (107 kg)	Fr	Winnebago HS	Winnebago, IL

Head coach

- Tony Pujol (Sterling (KS))

Assistant coach(es)

- Willie Watson (Alabama)
- Tom Barryman (Alabama)
- Ahmad Smith (Appalachian State)

Legend

- (C) Team captain
- (S) Suspended
- (I) Ineligible
- (W) Walk-on
- Injured
- Current redshirt

Roster
Last update: June 28, 2024

== Schedule and results ==
Date time, TV	Rank^{#}	Opponent^{#}	Result	Record	High points	High rebounds	High assists	Site (attendance) city, state
Non-conference regular season
November 6, 2018*; 7:00 p.m., ESPN3		at Samford	L 74–91	0–1	17 – Blackmon	5 – Stafford	3 – tied	Pete Hanna Center (1,383); Birmingham, AL
November 10, 2018*; 8:00 p.m., ESPN+		Blue Mountain	W 72–59	1–1	22 – Blackmon	9 – Stafford	4 – tied	Flowers Hall (987); Florence, AL
November 13, 2018*; 7:00 p.m.		at Saint Louis	L 58–69	1–2	16 – Diggs	9 – Diggs	4 – tied	Chaifetz Arena (4,972); St. Louis, MO
November 17, 2018*; 11:00 a.m., ACCN Extra		at Pittsburgh	L 66–71	1–3	19 – Smith	10 – Littles	7 – Blackmon	Peterson Events Center (3,540); Pittsburgh, PA
November 20, 2018*; 6:00 p.m.		Martin Methodist	W 80–68	2–3	19 – tied	8 – Agnew	4 – King	Flowers Hall (446); Florence, AL
November 24, 2018*; 11:30 a.m.		at Troy	L 58–77	2–4	16 – Smith	12 – Littles	2 – 3 tied	Trojan Arena (1,423); Troy, AL
November 28, 2018*; 7:00 p.m.		at Toledo	L 59–80	2–5	16 – Blackmon	6 – Agnew	3 – tied	Savage Arena (3,714); Toledo, OH
December 1, 2018*; 12:00 p.m.		Jacksonville State	L 65–76	2–6	22 – Blackmon	9 – Blackmon	6 – Blackmon	Flowers Hall (844); Florence, AL
December 4, 2018*; 7:00 p.m.		at UAB	L 67–73	2–7	19 – Smith	7 – Stafford	5 – Smith	Bartow Arena (3,222); Birmingham, AL
December 13, 2018*; 11:00 a.m.		Huntingdon	W 90–58	3–7	20 – Smith	9 – Stafford	3 – tied	Flowers Hall (1,244); Florence, AL
December 15, 2018*; 5:00 p.m.		at UNC Greensboro	L 48–53	3–8	17 – Blackmon	9 – Dutreil	3 – Smith	Fleming Gymnasium (1,545); Greensboro, NC
December 18, 2018*; 7:30 p.m.		at Jacksonville State	L 50–64	3–9	9 – Blackmon	7 – Blackmon	3 – tied	Pete Mathews Coliseum (1,295); Jacksonville, AL
December 21, 2018*; 7:00 p.m.		at VMI	L 68–89	3–10	16 – Stafford	9 – Littles	2 – Agnew	Cameron Hall (600); Lexington, VA
December 28, 2018*; 8:00 p.m., RTNW		at No. 7 Gonzaga	L 51–96	3–11	18 – Agnew	7 – Littles	2 – Blackmon	McCarthey Athletic Center (6,000); Spokane, WA
December 30, 2018*; 2:00 p.m., ESPN+		at Eastern Illinois	L 70–81	3–12	19 – Blackmon	9 – Stafford	5 – Smith	Lantz Arena (1,010); Charleston, IL
ASUN regular season
January 5, 2019; 4:00 p.m., ESPN+		at North Florida	L 67–96	3–13 (0–1)	20 – Agnew	9 – Littles	5 – Stafford	UNF Arena (1,509); Jacksonville, FL
January 8, 2019; 8:00 p.m., ESPN+		Florida Gulf Coast	W 61–56	4–13 (1–1)	15 – King	12 – Dutreil	6 – Blackmon	Flowers Hall (850); Florence, AL
January 12, 2019; 3:30 p.m., ESPN+		NJIT	W 61–55	5–13 (2–1)	16 – tied	11 – Littles	3 – Stafford	Flowers Hall (908); Florence, AL
January 15, 2019; 6:00 p.m., ESPN+		at Jacksonville	W 91–88	6–13 (3–1)	26 – Agnew	14 – Littles	4 – Blackmon	Swisher Gymnasium (792); Jacksonville, FL
January 19, 2019; 3:00 p.m., ESPN+		Stetson	W 63–62	7–13 (4–1)	15 – Smith	18 – Littles	3 – Stafford	Flowers Hall (1,251); Florence, AL
January 21, 2019; 6:00 p.m., ESPN+		at Liberty	L 47–72	7–14 (4–2)	13 – tied	5 – Stafford	4 – Smith	Vines Center (2,716); Lynchburg, VA
January 24, 2019; 6:00 p.m., ESPN+		Kennesaw State	W 76–71	8–14 (5–2)	18 – Smith	10 – Stafford	4 – 3 tied	Flowers Hall (811); Florence, AL
January 27, 2019; 3:00 p.m., ESPN+		at NJIT	L 70–76 ^{OT}	8–15 (5–3)	21 – Smith	8 – Littles	4 – Smith	Wellness and Events Center (911); Newark, NJ
February 2, 2019; 4:00 p.m., ESPN+		at Lipscomb	L 80–102	8–16 (5–4)	18 – Stafford	6 – Stafford	3 – Blackmon	Allen Arena (3,408); Nashville, TN
February 6, 2019; 6:00 p.m., ESPN+		at Florida Gulf Coast	L 64–71	8–17 (5–5)	23 – Agnew	7 – Littles	2 – tied	Alico Arena (3,505); Fort Myers, FL
February 9, 2019; 3:00 p.m., ESPN+		North Florida	L 73–82	8–18 (5–6)	24 – Smith	13 – Stafford	4 – tied	Flowers Hall (1,003); Florence, AL
February 16, 2019; 3:00 pm, ESPN+		Liberty	L 70–80	8–19 (5–7)	17 – Smith	6 – Blackmon	3 – Smith	Flowers Hall (967); Florence, AL
February 19, 2019; 6:00 pm, ESPN+		at Kennesaw State	W 76–61	9–19 (6–7)	21 – Stafford	10 – Stafford	8 – Smith	KSU Convocation Center (608); Kennesaw, GA
February 23, 2019; 3:00 p.m., ESPN+		at Stetson	L 60–63	9–20 (6–8)	21 – King	10 – Smith	4 – Blackmon	Edmunds Center (300); DeLand, FL
February 27, 2019; 6:00 p.m., ESPN+		Jacksonville	W 69–55	10–20 (7–8)	24 – King	14 – Littles	4 – Stafford	Flowers Hall (1,112); Florence, AL
March 1, 2019; 6:00 p.m., ESPN+		Lipscomb	L 75–87	10–21 (7–9)	22 – Blackmon	11 – Stafford	3 – Blackmon	Flowers Hall (1,268); Florence, AL
ASUN tournament
March 4, 2019; 7:00 p.m., ESPN3	(6)	(3) North Florida; Quarterfinals	L 66–76	10–22	15 – Blackmon	11 – Smith	5 – Blackmon	UNF Arena (1,924); Jacksonville, FL
*Non-conference game. ^{#}Rankings from AP poll. (#) Tournament seedings in parentheses. All times are in Central.
