= 2018–19 North Florida Ospreys men's basketball team =

American college basketball season

2018–19 North Florida Ospreys men's basketball
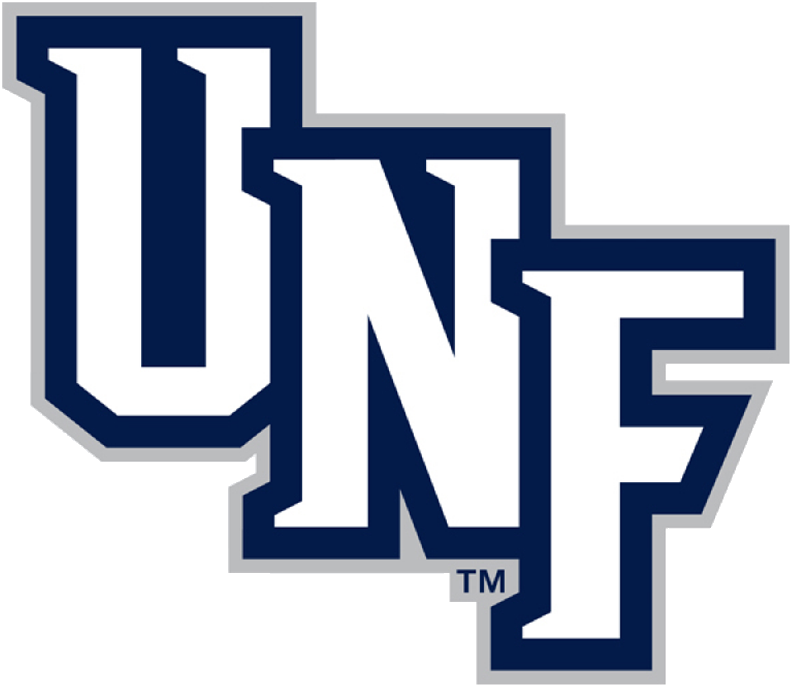
- Conference: Atlantic Sun Conference
- Record: 16–17 (9–7 ASUN)
- Head coach: Matthew Driscoll (10th season)
- Assistant coaches: Bobby Kennen; Bruce Evans; Stephen Perkins
- Home arena: UNF Arena

2018–19 ASUN men's basketball standings
	Conf.				Overall
Team	W		L	PCT	W		L	PCT
Liberty †	14	–	2	.875	29	–	7	.806
Lipscomb	14	–	2	.875	29	–	8	.784
North Florida	9	–	7	.563	16	–	17	.485
Florida Gulf Coast	9	–	7	.563	14	–	18	.438
NJIT	8	–	8	.500	22	–	13	.629
North Alabama	7	–	9	.438	10	–	22	.313
Jacksonville	5	–	11	.313	12	–	20	.375
Kennesaw State	3	–	13	.188	6	–	26	.188
Stetson	3	–	13	.188	7	–	24	.226
† 2019 ASUN tournament winner

The 2018–19 North Florida Ospreys men's basketball team represented the University of North Florida in the 2018–19 NCAA Division I men's basketball season. They played their home games at the UNF Arena in Jacksonville, Florida and were led by 10th-year head coach Matthew Driscoll.

== Previous season ==
The Ospreys finished the 2017–18 season 14–19, 7–7 in ASUN play to finish in a tie for fourth place. In the ASUN tournament, they defeated NJIT, before losing in the semifinals to Florida Gulf Coast.

== Roster ==
2018–19 North Florida Ospreys men's basketball team
Players
Coaches

Pos.	#	Name	Height	Weight	Year	Previous school	Hometown
F	0	Noah Horchler	6 ft 8 in (2.03 m)	210 lb (95 kg)	Jr	Eastern Florida State College	Melbourne, FL
G/F	1	Emmanuel Lambright	6 ft 6 in (1.98 m)	203 lb (92 kg)	So	Sarasota HS	Sarasota, FL
F	2	Wajid Aminu	6 ft 7 in (2.01 m)	190 lb (86 kg)	Jr	Wheeler HS	Stone Mountain, GA
G	3	J.T. Escobar	6 ft 2 in (1.88 m)	183 lb (83 kg)	RS Jr	Ole Miss	Tallahassee, FL
F	4	Ezekiel Balogun	6 ft 6 in (1.98 m)	235 lb (107 kg)	Jr	Eastern Florida State College	Lagos, Nigeria
F	5	Dorian James	6 ft 7 in (2.01 m)	185 lb (84 kg)	Fr	Chain of Lakes Collegiate HS	Winter Haven, FL
G	10	Ivan Gandia-Rosa	6 ft 1 in (1.85 m)	190 lb (86 kg)	Jr	College of Central Florida	Caguas, Puerto Rico
G/F	11	Garrett Sams	6 ft 7 in (2.01 m)	195 lb (88 kg)	Jr	Westview HS	Martin, TN
G	12	Ryan Burkhardt	6 ft 4 in (1.93 m)	180 lb (82 kg)	So	St. Augustine HS	St. Augustine, FL
G	20	Brian Coffey II	6 ft 1 in (1.85 m)	175 lb (79 kg)	So	Shiloh HS	Snellville, GA
G	21	Christian Schach	6 ft 1 in (1.85 m)	190 lb (86 kg)	Fr	Tampa Prep	Tampa, FL
F	22	Trip Day	6 ft 7 in (2.01 m)	223 lb (101 kg)	So	Glenwood School	Columbus, GA
F	23	Carter Hendricksen	6 ft 7 in (2.01 m)	201 lb (91 kg)	Fr	Lexington Christian Academy	Lexington, KY
F	24	Cam Copeland	6 ft 5 in (1.96 m)	160 lb (73 kg)	Fr	Douglas County HS	Douglasville, GA

Head coach

- Matthew Driscoll (Slippery Rock)

Assistant coach(es)

- Bobby Kennen (Palm Beach Atlantic)
- Bruce Evans (Furman)
- Stephen Perkins (Baylor)

Legend

- (C) Team captain
- (S) Suspended
- (I) Ineligible
- (W) Walk-on
- Injured
- Current redshirt

Roster
Last update: December 6, 2018

== Schedule and results ==
Date time, TV	Rank^{#}	Opponent^{#}	Result	Record	Site (attendance) city, state
Non-conference regular season
November 7, 2018*; 7:00 pm, ESPN+		at Dayton	L 70–78	0–1	UD Arena (12,522); Dayton, OH
November 9, 2018*; 7:30 pm, BTN Plus		at Penn State; Cancún Challenge campus game	L 72–87	0–2	Bryce Jordan Center (9,060); University Park, PA
November 14, 2018*; 7:00 pm, ESPN+		Edward Waters	W 95–83	1–2	UNF Arena (1,852); Jacksonville, FL
November 17, 2018*; 3:00 pm, ESPN3		at Wright State; Cancún Challenge campus game	L 72–89	1–3	Nutter Center (3,207); Fairborn, OH
November 20, 2018*; 3:00 pm, CBS Digital		vs. Southern Miss; Cancún Challenge Mayan Division semifinals	W 64–48	2–3	Hard Rock Hotel Riviera Maya (200); Cancún, Mexico
November 21, 2018*; 3:00 pm, CBS Digital		vs. Jacksonville State; Cancún Challenge Mayan Division championship	L 78–83	2–4	Hard Rock Hotel Riviera Maya (121); Cancún, Mexico
November 27, 2018*; 7:00 pm, SECN		at Florida	L 66–98	2–5	Exactech Arena (8,505); Gainesville, FL
November 29, 2018*; 8:00 pm, ESPN+		Florida A&M	W 81–62	3–5	UNF Arena (2,041); Jacksonville, FL
December 1, 2018*; 5:30 pm, ESPN+		at Charleston Southern	W 76–70	4–5	CSU Field House (782); North Charleston, SC
December 11, 2018*; 9:00 pm, BTN		at Minnesota	L 71–80	4–6	Williams Arena (9,212); Minneapolis, MN
December 13, 2018*; 7:00 pm		at FIU	L 89–102	4–7	Ocean Bank Convocation Center (622); Miami, FL
December 15, 2018*; 5:00 pm, ESPN+		Charleston Southern	W 68–61	5–7	UNF Arena (1,282); Jacksonville, FL
December 19, 2018*; 7:00 pm, ACCN Extra		at No. 11 Florida State	L 81–95	5–8	Donald L. Tucker Center (6,209); Tallahassee, FL
December 29, 2018*; 5:00 pm, SECN+		at No. 12 Auburn	L 49–95	5–9	Auburn Arena (8,450); Auburn, AL
January 2, 2019*; 7:00 pm, ESPN+		Florida National	W 104–76	6–9	UNF Arena (1,338); Jacksonville, FL
Atlantic Sun Conference regular season
January 5, 2019; 5:00 pm, ESPN+		North Alabama	W 96–67	7–9 (1–0)	UNF Arena (1,509); Jacksonville, FL
January 9, 2019; 7:30 pm, ESPN+		at Lipscomb	L 66–81	7–10 (1–1)	Allen Arena; Nashville, TN
January 12, 2019; 5:00 pm, ESPN+		Florida Gulf Coast	W 87–66	8–10 (2–1)	UNF Arena (2,181); Jacksonville, FL
January 16, 2019; 7:00 pm, ESPN+		at Stetson	W 87–77	9–10 (3–1)	Edmunds Center (537); DeLand, FL
January 19, 2019; 7:00 pm, ESPN+		at Liberty	L 64–70	9–11 (3–2)	Vines Center (4,958); Lynchburg, VA
January 21, 2019; 7:00 pm, ESPN+		NJIT	L 72–76	9–12 (3–3)	UNF Arena (1,401); Jacksonville, FL
January 24, 2019; 7:00 pm, ESPN+		Jacksonville	L 81–86	9–13 (3–4)	UNF Arena (2,658); Jacksonville, FL
January 27, 2019; 5:00 pm, ESPN+		at Florida Gulf Coast	L 80–88	9–14 (3–5)	Alico Arena (3,072); Fort Myers, FL
January 30, 2019; 7:00 pm, ESPN+		at Kennesaw State	L 64–81	9–15 (3–6)	KSU Convocation Center (871); Kennesaw, GA
February 6, 2019; 7:00 pm, ESPN+		Lipscomb	L 55–92	9–16 (3–7)	UNF Arena (1,521); Jacksonville, FL
February 9, 2019; 4:00 pm, ESPN+		at North Alabama	W 82–73	10–16 (4–7)	Flowers Hall (1,003); Florence, AL
February 13, 2019; 7:00 pm, ESPN+		Kennesaw State	W 80–57	11–16 (5–7)	UNF Arena (1,568); Jacksonville, FL
February 16, 2019; 5:00 pm, ESPN+		at NJIT	W 64–63	12–16 (6–7)	Wellness and Events Center (554); Newark, NJ
February 20, 2019; 7:00 pm, ESPN+		at Jacksonville	W 80–73	13–16 (7–7)	Swisher Gymnasium; Jacksonville, FL
February 23, 2019; 5:00 pm, ESPN+		Liberty	W 75–70	14–16 (8–7)	UNF Arena (2,169); Jacksonville, FL
February 26, 2019; 7:00 pm, ESPN+		Stetson	W 77–67	15–16 (9–7)	UNF Arena (1,421); Jacksonville, FL
Atlantic Sun tournament
March 4, 2019; 7:00 pm, ESPN3	(3)	(6) North Alabama; Quarterfinals	W 76–66	16–16	UNF Arena (1,924); Jacksonville, FL
March 7, 2019; 7:00 pm, ESPN3	(3)	at (2) Liberty; Semifinals	L 63–71	16–17	Vines Center (2,319); Lynchburg, VA
*Non-conference game. ^{#}Rankings from AP Poll. (#) Tournament seedings in parentheses. All times are in Eastern.
