= Garrison Mathews =

American basketball player (born 1996)

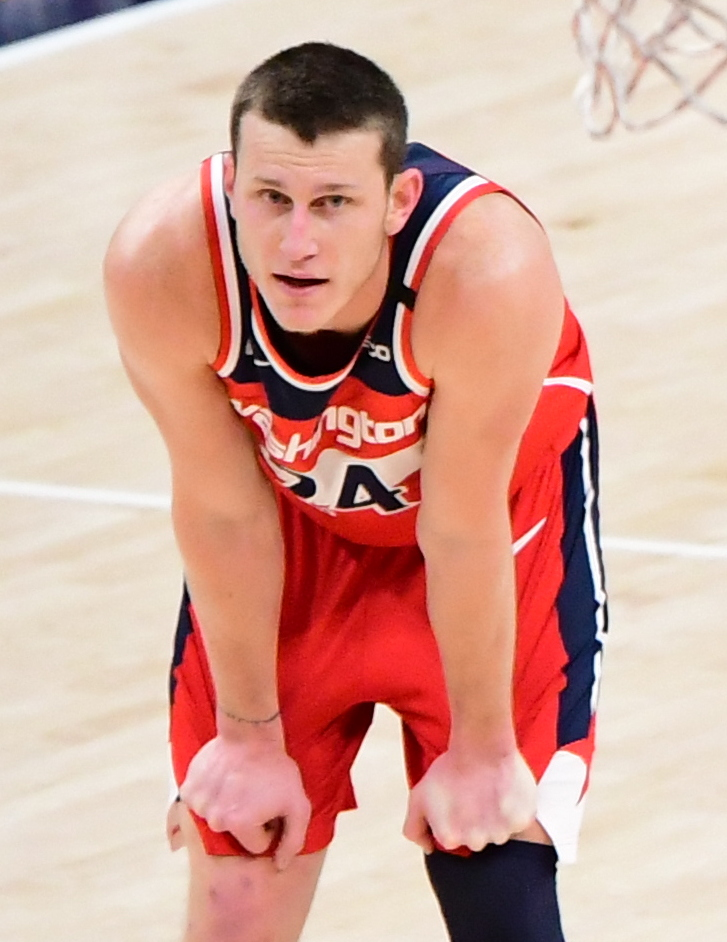
- Mathews with the Washington Wizards in 2020

No. 24 – Olimpia Milano
- Position: Shooting guard
- League: LBA; EuroLeague

Personal information
- Born: October 24, 1996 (age 30) Franklin, Tennessee, U.S.
- Listed height: 6 ft 5 in (1.96 m)
- Listed weight: 215 lb (98 kg)

Career information
- High school: Franklin (Franklin, Tennessee)
- College: Lipscomb (2015–2019)
- NBA draft: 2019: undrafted
- Playing career: 2019–present

Career history
- 2019–2021: Washington Wizards
- 2019–2020: →Capital City Go-Go
- 2021–2023: Houston Rockets
- 2021: →Rio Grande Valley Vipers
- 2023–2025: Atlanta Hawks
- 2025: Indiana Pacers
- 2026–present: Olimpia Milano

Career highlights
- Atlantic Sun Player of the Year (2019); 3× First-team All-Atlantic Sun (2017–2019)
- Stats at NBA.com
- Stats at Basketball Reference

Garrison Mathews (born October 24, 1996) is an American professional basketball player for Olimpia Milano of the Italian Lega Basket Serie A (LBA) and the EuroLeague. He played college basketball for the Lipscomb Bisons and was named the ASUN Conference Player of the Year for 2019.

== College career ==
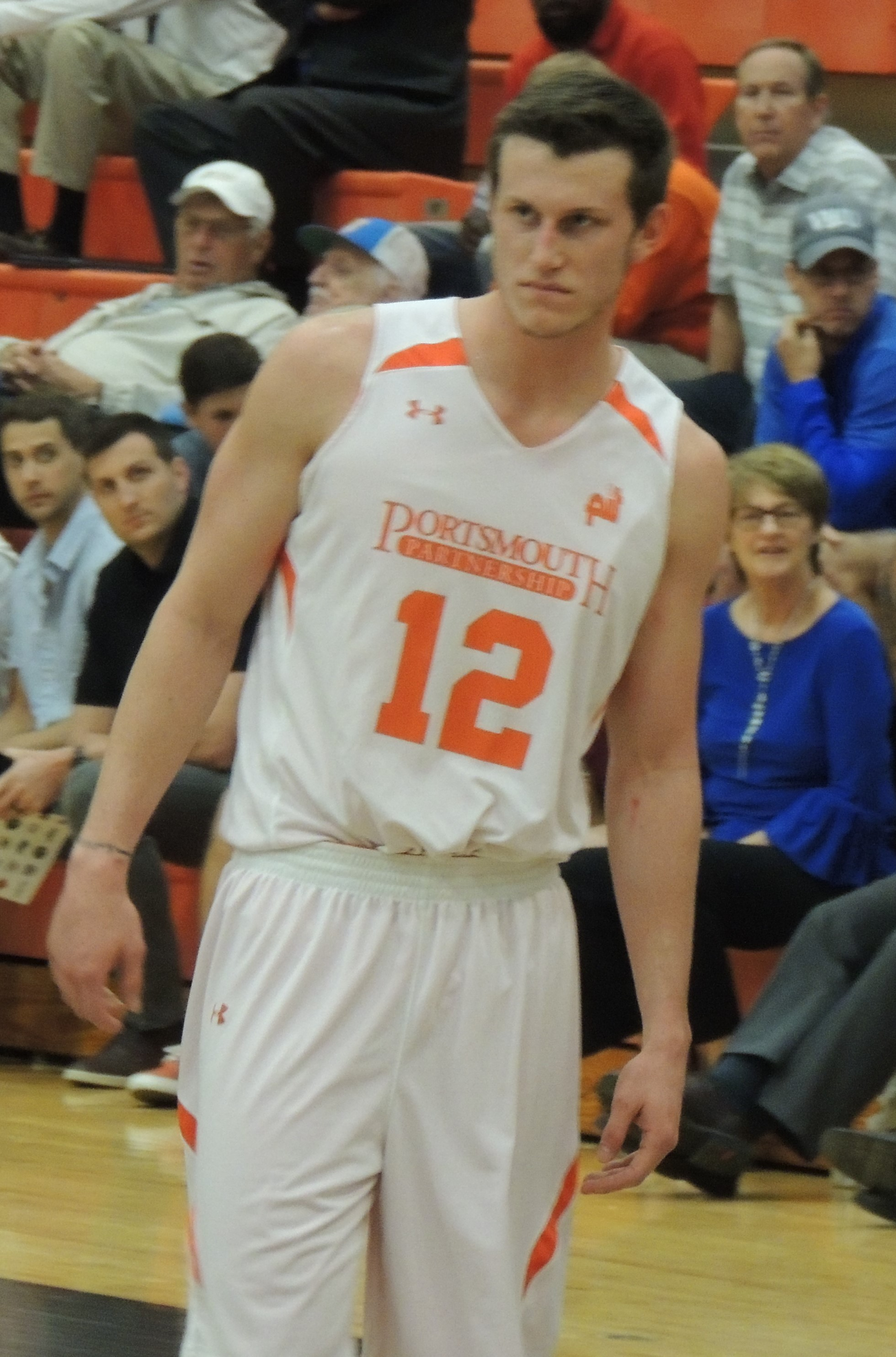
Mathews in 2019

Mathews was a dual-sport athlete at Franklin High School in Franklin, Tennessee, playing both basketball and football. At Lipscomb, Mathews dedicated himself solely to basketball for the first time. He became one of the top players in program history, setting the school's Division I-era records in single-game scoring, career scoring, and three-pointers made.

As a junior, Mathews led the Bisons to their first NCAA tournament. As a senior, he was named Atlantic Sun Player of the Year and first-team All-Atlantic Sun. He also led Lipscomb to a runner-up finish at the 2019 NIT. Mathews scored 44 and 34 points in the tournament's quarterfinals and semifinals, respectively, to help the Bisons reach the championship game, in which they were defeated by Texas. Mathews averaged 20.8 points per game as a senior and scored 2,478 career points in college.

== Professional career ==
=== Washington Wizards (2019–2021) ===
After going undrafted in the 2019 NBA draft, Mathews signed a two-way contract with the Washington Wizards of the National Basketball Association (NBA). Under the terms of the deal he divided his time between the Wizards and the NBA G League affiliate, the Capital City Go-Go. On October 23, 2019, Mathews made his NBA debut, coming off the bench in a 100–108 loss to the Dallas Mavericks with an assist, playing only one minute. On December 30, Mathews scored a career-high 28 points with four rebounds in a 123–105 win over the Miami Heat.

=== Houston Rockets (2021–2023) ===
On September 28, 2021, Mathews signed with the Boston Celtics, but was waived at the end of training camp. On October 18, he was claimed off waivers by the Houston Rockets, who later turned his deal into a two-way contract with the Rio Grande Valley Vipers. On December 18, the Rockets announced they had converted Mathews' two-way deal to a four-year, $8.2 million standard contract. He made 65 appearances (including 33 starts) for Houston during the 2021–22 NBA season, averaging 10.0 points, 2.9 rebounds, and 1.0 assists.

Mathews made 45 appearances for the Rockets during the 2022–23 season, recording averages of 4.8 points, 1.4 rebounds, and 0.5 assists.

=== Atlanta Hawks (2023–2025) ===
On February 9, 2023, Mathews and Bruno Fernando were traded to the Atlanta Hawks in exchange for Justin Holiday, Frank Kaminsky and two future second-round draft picks. He made nine appearances for the team over the remainder of the year, posting averages of 4.8 points, 1.4 rebounds, and 0.6 assists.

Mathews made 66 appearances (five starts) for Atlanta during the 2023–24 NBA season, averaging 4.9 points, 1.4 rebounds, and 0.6 assists. He played in 47 games (including two starts) for the Hawks in the 2024–25 NBA season, averaging 7.5 points, 1.9 rebounds, and 1.3 assists.

On September 16, 2025, Mathews signed an Exhibit 10 contract with the New York Knicks. He was waived by the Knicks prior to the start of the regular season on October 18.

=== Indiana Pacers (2025) ===
Mathews signed a 10-day contract with the Indiana Pacers on November 20, 2025, after the team was granted a hardship exception. On December 1, the Pacers re-signed Mathews to a second 10-day hardship contract. On December 11, Mathews signed a non-guaranteed standard contract with the team for the remainder of the season. In 15 appearances (one start) for the Pacers, he averaged 5.2 points, 1.1 rebounds, and 0.7 assists. On December 26, Mathews was waived by Indiana following the signing of Micah Potter.

=== Olimpia Milano (2026–present) ===
On August 18, 2026, Mathews signed with Olimpia Milano of the Lega Basket Serie A (LBA) and the EuroLeague.

== Career statistics ==
Legend
GP	Games played	GS	Games started	MPG	Minutes per game
FG%	Field goal percentage	3P%	3-point field goal percentage	FT%	Free throw percentage
RPG	Rebounds per game	APG	Assists per game	SPG	Steals per game
BPG	Blocks per game	PPG	Points per game	**Bold**	Career high

=== NBA ===
==== Regular season ====
Year	Team	GP	GS	MPG	FG%	3P%	FT%	RPG	APG	SPG	BPG	PPG
2019–20	Washington	18	0	12.6	.429	.413	**.912**	1.3	.6	.4	.1	5.4
2020–21	Washington	64	24	16.2	.409	.384	.884	1.4	.4	.5	.1	5.5
2021–22	Houston	65	**33**	**26.3**	.399	.360	.794	**2.9**	1.0	**.8**	**.3**	**10.0**
2022–23	Houston	45	0	13.4	.353	.342	.911	1.4	.5	.5	.1	4.8
2022–23	Atlanta	9	0	9.4	.419	.400	.875	1.2	.3	.1	.1	4.8
2023–24	Atlanta	**66**	5	15.0	**.456**	**.440**	.810	1.4	.6	.3	.1	4.9
2024–25	Atlanta	47	2	17.7	.397	.390	.821	1.9	**1.3**	.6	.3	7.5
2025–26	Indiana	15	1	13.1	.404	.370	.826	1.1	.7	.4	.2	5.2
Career		329	65	17.3	.405	.382	.838	1.7	.7	.5	.2	6.4

==== Playoffs ====
Year	Team	GP	GS	MPG	FG%	3P%	FT%	RPG	APG	SPG	BPG	PPG
2021	Washington	3	0	5.7	.000	.000	.800	.7	.0	.0	.0	1.3
Career		3	0	5.7	.000	.000	.800	.7	.0	.0	.0	1.3

=== College ===
Year	Team	GP	GS	MPG	FG%	3P%	FT%	RPG	APG	SPG	BPG	PPG
2015–16	Lipscomb	33	12	20.8	.403	.349	.732	3.4	1.5	.8	.2	10.9
2016–17	Lipscomb	32	32	**31.3**	.458	.352	.726	**5.6**	**2.3**	.8	.2	20.4
2017–18	Lipscomb	33	32	30.4	**.465**	.381	.799	5.5	1.8	**1.0**	**.3**	**21.7**
2018–19	Lipscomb	**36**	**36**	30.1	.443	**.403**	**.860**	5.5	1.9	.8	**.3**	20.8
Career		134	112	28.2	.446	.374	.789	5.0	1.9	.9	.2	18.5
