= Scottie James =

American basketball player (born 1996)

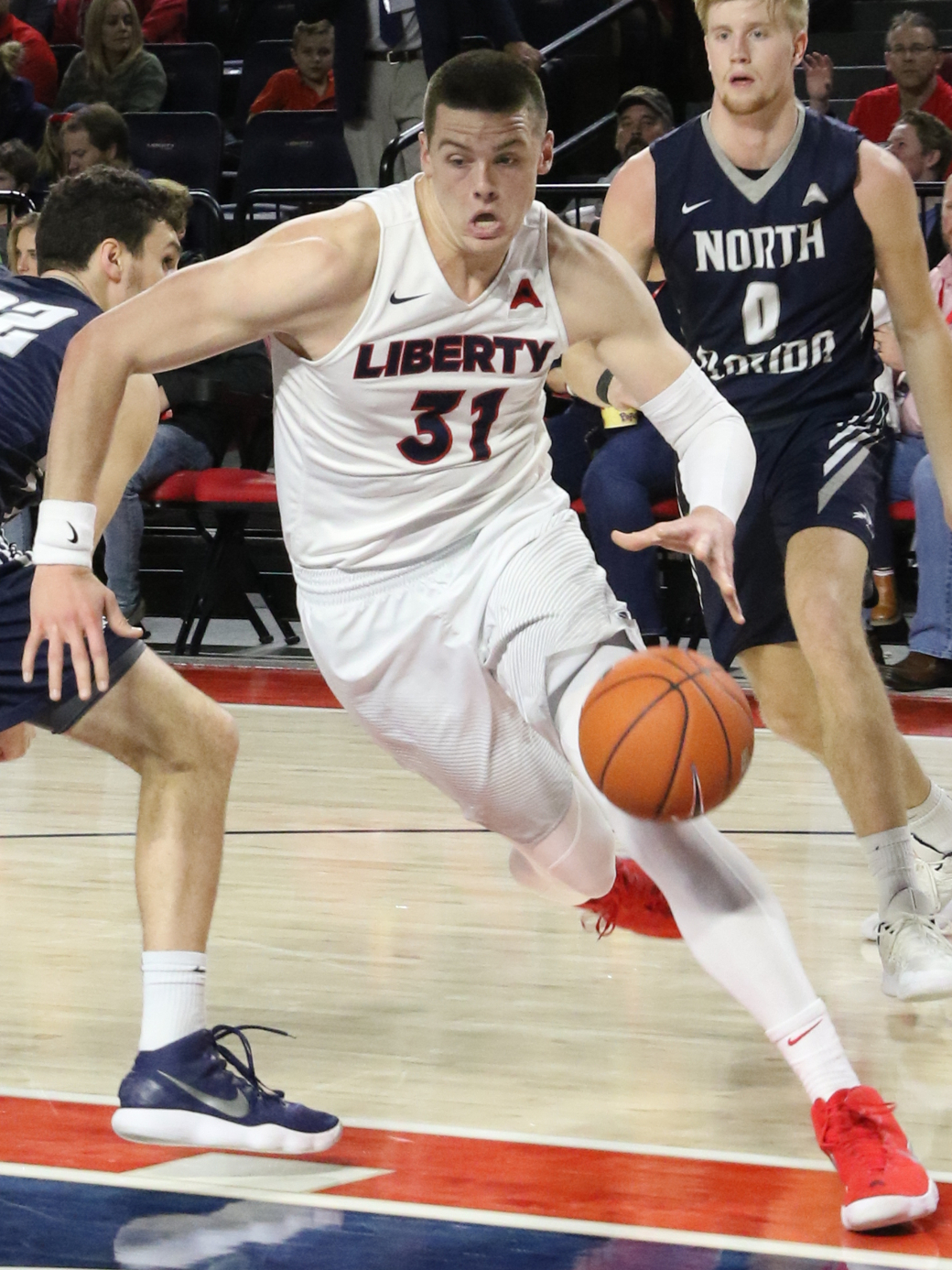
- James with Liberty in 2019

No. 31 – Goyang Sono Skygunners
- Position: Power forward
- League: KBL

Personal information
- Born: November 7, 1996 (age 30) Warsaw, Indiana, U.S.
- Listed height: 6 ft 8 in (2.03 m)
- Listed weight: 235 lb (107 kg)

Career information
- High school: Tarpon Springs (Tarpon Springs, Florida)
- College: Bradley (2015–2016); Liberty (2017–2020)
- NBA draft: 2020: undrafted
- Playing career: 2020–present

Career history
- 2020–2021: Gießen 46ers
- 2021–2022: Hapoel Haifa
- 2022–2026: Tianjin Pioneers
- 2024–2026: Gigantes de Carolina
- 2025: Hong Kong Bulls
- 2026–present: Goyang Sono Skygunners

Career highlights
- CBA rebounding leader (2025); 2× CBA All-International Team (2024, 2025); 2× First-team All-Atlantic Sun (2019, 2020); Atlantic Sun tournament MVP (2019); Second-team All-Big South (2018)

David Scott James Jr. (born November 7, 1996) is an American professional basketball player for the Goyang Sono Skygunners of the Korean Basketball League (KBL). He played college basketball for the Bradley Braves and Liberty Flames.

== High school career ==
James grew up in Indiana but moved to Tarpon Springs, Florida. He attended Tarpon Springs High School and had his number retired after setting 14 school records. As a senior, he averaged 19.5 points, 14 rebounds, 2.8 blocks, 2.8 assists, and 1.5 steals per game. James finished his high school career with over 1,500 points and collected more than 1,000 rebounds. He committed to Bradley over offers from Wofford and Florida Gulf Coast.

== College career ==
As a freshman at Bradley, James averaged 3.2 points and 2.6 rebounds per game. Following the season, he opted to transfer to Liberty. On February 3, 2018, he scored a career-high 26 points and grabbed nine rebounds in a 67–55 win against Longwood. James finished his redshirt sophomore season as a second-team All-Big South selection after shooting 61.6 percent from the floor and averaging 13.5 points and 8.9 rebounds per game. He was named the 2019 Atlantic Sun tournament MVP after scoring 17 points and pulling down eight rebounds in Liberty's 74–68 victory over Lipscomb in the title game. James averaged a team-leading 12.6 points and 8.6 rebounds per game as a junior, shooting 66.5 percent from the field. He was named to the First Team All-Atlantic Sun. As a senior, James averaged 10.8 points and 7.4 rebounds per game and finished first in the conference in field goal percentage (60.5 percent). At the conclusion of the regular season, James was named to the First Team All-Atlantic Sun. He finished No. 17 on the Liberty all-time scoring list with 1,323 points and fourth on the all-time rebounding list with 891.

== Professional career ==
On August 8, 2020, James signed his first professional contract with the Gießen 46ers in Germany.

On June 18, 2021, he signed with Riesen Ludwigsburg of the Basketball Bundesliga.

On September 3, James signed with Hapoel Haifa of the Israeli Basketball Premier League.

=== The Basketball Tournament ===
James joined War Tampa in The Basketball Tournament 2020. He finished with 7 points and 5 rebounds in the 76–53 opening-round loss to House of ‘Paign.

== Personal life ==
James in the son of Christy and David Scott James and has two siblings. His father played college basketball for Grace College. He led the Lancers to the 1992 NAIA Division II national championship and earned first-team All-America by the NAIA in 1993. James's mother serves as an assistant director in the Center for Academic Development at Liberty. Coach Ritchie McKay officiated James's wedding in 2019.
