= 2016–17 ASUN Conference men's basketball season =

- League: NCAA Division I
- Sport: Basketball
- Teams: 8

Regular season
- Champions: Florida Gulf Coast
- Season MVP: Dallas Moore, North Florida

Tournament
- Champions: Florida Gulf Coast
- Runners-up: North Florida

ASUN men's basketball seasons
- 2015–16 2017–18

2016–17 ASUN men's basketball standings
	Conf.				Overall
Team	W		L	PCT	W		L	PCT
Florida Gulf Coast †	12	–	2	.857	26	–	8	.765
Lipscomb	11	–	3	.786	20	–	13	.606
North Florida	8	–	6	.571	15	–	19	.441
USC Upstate	7	–	7	.500	17	–	16	.515
Kennesaw State	7	–	7	.500	14	–	18	.438
Jacksonville	5	–	9	.357	17	–	16	.515
NJIT	3	–	11	.214	11	–	20	.355
Stetson	3	–	11	.214	11	–	21	.344
† 2017 ASUN Tournament winner

The 2016–17 ASUN Conference men's basketball season began with practices in October 2016, followed by the start of the 2016–17 NCAA Division I men's basketball season in November. Conference play began on January 24, 2017 and concluded on February 23, 2017. The season marked the 39th season of ASUN Conference basketball, and also the first under the conference's current branding with the ASUN name.

Florida Gulf Coast won the regular season championship by one game over Lipscomb. The ASUN tournament was held from February 27 through March 5 at campus sites as top seeds hosted each round. Florida Gulf Coast defeated North Florida in the championship game to win the tournament championship. As a result, Florida Gulf Coast received the conference's automatic bid to the NCAA tournament.

North Florida's Dallas Moore was named conference player of the year. Florida Gulf Coast’s head coach Joe Dooley was named conference coach of the year.

In addition to Florida Gulf Coast's invitation to the NCAA Tournament, USC Upstate and Jacksonville were invited to the CollegeInsider.com Postseason Tournament.

== Conference matrix ==
	Florida Gulf Coast	Jacksonville	Kennesaw State	Lipscomb	NJIT	North Florida	Stetson	USC Upstate
vs. Florida Gulf Coast	—	0–2	0–2	1–1	0–2	0–2	0–2	1–1
vs. Jacksonville	2–0	—	1–1	2–0	0–1	2–0	0–2	2–0
vs. Kennesaw State	2–0	1–1	—	2–0	0–2	1–1	0–2	1–1
vs. Lipscomb	1–1	0–2	0–2	—	0–2	2–0	0–2	0–1
vs. NJIT	2–0	2–0	2–0	2–0	—	1–1	1–1	1–1
vs. North Florida	2–0	1–1	1–1	0–2	1–1	—	1–1	1–1
vs. Stetson	2–0	2–0	2–0	2–0	1–1	1–1	—	1–1
vs. USC Upstate	1–1	0–2	1–1	2–0	1–1	1–1	1–1	—
Total	12–2	5–9	7–7	11–3	3–11	8–6	3–11	7–7

== Points scored ==
=== Conference regular season ===
Team	For	Against	Difference
Florida Gulf Coast	1092	990	102
Jacksonville	1043	1109	-66
Kennesaw State	1077	1050	27
Lipscomb	1191	1079	112
NJIT	983	1069	-86
North Florida	1114	1082	32
Stetson	1098	1203	-105
USC Upstate	1089	1089	0

Through February 23, 2017

== All-ASUN Awards ==
Honor	Recipient
Player of the Year	Dallas Moore, North Florida
Coach of the Year	Joe Dooley, Florida Gulf Coast
Rookie of the Year	Wajid Aminu, North Florida
All-ASUN First Team	Dallas Moore, North Florida
All-ASUN First Team	Brandon Goodwin, Florida Gulf Coast
All-ASUN First Team	Garrison Mathews, Lipscomb
All-ASUN First Team	Kendrick Ray, Kennesaw State
All-ASUN First Team	Michael Buchanan, South Carolina Upstate
All-ASUN Second Team	J.R. Holder, Jacksonville
All-ASUN Second Team	Aubrey Williams, Kennesaw State
All-ASUN Second Team	Rob Marberry, Lipscomb
All-ASUN Second Team	Damon Lynn, New Jersey Institute of Technology
All-ASUN Second Team	Derick Newton, Stetson
All-ASUN Freshmen Team	Wajid Aminu, North Florida
All-ASUN Freshmen Team	Tanner Rubio, Jacksonville
All-ASUN Freshmen Team	James Scott, Kennesaw State
All-ASUN Freshmen Team	Anthony Tarke, NJIT
All-ASUN Freshmen Team	Garrett Sams, North Florida

== Postseason ==
Time	Matchup	Score	Television	Attendance
Quarterfinals – Monday, February 27
7:00 p.m.	No. 8 Stetson at No. 1 Florida Gulf Coast	57–87	ESPN3	3,744
7:00 p.m.	No. 5 Kennesaw State at No. 4 USC Upstate	80–78	ESPN3	735
7:00 p.m.	No. 6 Jacksonville at No. 3 North Florida	74–77	ESPN3	2,938
8:00 p.m.	No. 7 NJIT at No. 2 Lipscomb	66–97	ESPN3	2,456
Semifinals – Thursday, March 2
7:00 p.m.	No. 5 Kennesaw State at No. 1 Florida Gulf Coast	62–74	ESPN3	4,333
8:00 p.m.	No. 3 North Florida at No. 2 Lipscomb	91–85	ESPN3	3,011
Final – Sunday, March 5
3:00 p.m.	No. 3 North Florida at No. 1 Florida Gulf Coast	61–77	ESPN	4,711
*Game times in ET. No.-Rankings denote tournament seeding.
