= North Florida Ospreys men's basketball statistical leaders =

The North Florida Ospreys men's basketball statistical leaders are individual statistical leaders of the North Florida Ospreys men's basketball program in various categories, including points, assists, blocks, rebounds, and steals. Within those areas, the lists identify single-game, single-season, and career leaders. The Ospreys represent the University of North Florida in the NCAA's ASUN Conference.

North Florida began competing in intercollegiate basketball in 1991. These lists are updated through the end of the 2023–24 season.

== Scoring ==
Career
Rk	Player	Points	Seasons
1	Dallas Moore	2437	2013–14 2014–15 2015–16 2016–17
2	Carter Hendricksen	1651	2018–19 2019–20 2020–21 2021–22 2022–23
3	Beau Beech	1557	2012–13 2013–14 2014–15 2015–16
4	Garrett Sams	1538	2016–17 2017–18 2018–19 2019–20
5	Koran Godwin	1513	1999–00 2000–01 2001–02
6	Donny Lotz	1412	2001–02 2002–03 2003–04 2004–05
7	Parker Smith	1394	2010–11 2011–12 2012–13
8	Chris Davenport	1353	2013–14 2014–15 2015–16 2016–17
9	Wajid Aminu	1337	2016–17 2017–18 2018–19 2019–20
10	Ivan Gandia-Rosa	1259	2017–18 2018–19 2019–20

Season
Rk	Player	Points	Season
1	Dallas Moore	812	2016–17
2	Dallas Moore	672	2015–16
3	Kamrin Oriol	670	2025–26
4	Chaz Lanier	629	2023–24
5	Brian Sitter	601	1993–94
6	Koran Godwin	563	2000–01
7	Dallas Moore	554	2014–15
8	Antoine Stokes	543	1998–99
9	Beau Beech	522	2015–16
10	Parker Smith	520	2012–13

Single game
Rk	Player	Points	Season	Opponent
1	Parker Smith	46	2011–12	Mercer
2	Ian Foster	42	1996–97	Florida Tech
3	Brian Sitter	40	1993–94	Florida Southern
4	Dallas Moore	39	2016–17	Lipscomb
	Darrin Jackson	39	1994–95	Edward Waters
6	Dallas Moore	37	2016–17	Jacksonville
	Dallas Moore	37	2016–17	Edward Waters
8	Dallas Moore	36	2016–17	Lipscomb
	Dallas Moore	36	2014–15	Lipscomb
10	Kamrin Oriol	35	2025–26	Lipscomb
	Kent Jackson	35	2025–26	North Alabama
	Chaz Lanier	35	2023–24	North Alabama
	Carter Hendricksen	35	2022–23	Queens University
	Jose Placer	35	2021–22	Austin Peay

== Rebounds ==
Career
Rk	Player	Rebounds	Seasons
1	Chris Sneed	892	1992–93 1993–94 1994–95 1995–96
2	Wajid Aminu	837	2016–17 2017–18 2018–19 2019–20
3	Chris Davenport	825	2013–14 2014–15 2015–16 2016–17
4	Carter Hendricksen	742	2018–19 2019–20 2020–21 2021–22 2022–23
5	Beau Beech	672	2012–13 2013–14 2014–15 2015–16
6	Donny Lotz	660	2001–02 2002–03 2003–04 2004–05
7	Dorian James	646	2018–19 2019–20 2020–21 2021–22 2022–23 2023–24
8	James Grimball	581	2003–04 2004–05 2006–07 2007–08
9	Jamaal Williams	577	1994–95 1995–96 1996–97 1997–98
	Andy Diaz	577	2009–10 2010–11 2011–12 2012–13

Season
Rk	Player	Rebounds	Season
1	Noah Horchler	285	2017–18
2	Chris Sneed	264	1993–94
3	Noah Horchler	261	2018–19
4	Chris Davenport	245	2015–16
5	Travis Wallace	235	2013–14
6	Carter Hendricksen	233	2019–20
7	Chris Sneed	232	1995–96
8	Alex Novitchkov	223	2000–01
9	Chris Davenport	221	2014–15
10	Wajid Aminu	220	2016–17

Single game
Rk	Player	Rebounds	Season	Opponent
1	Travis Wallace	19	2013–14	Jacksonville
2	Chris Davenport	17	2014–15	Tennessee Tech
	Carter Hendricksen	17	2019–20	Georgia Southern
4	Chris Davenport	16	2015–16	Stetson
	James Grimball	16	2006–07	Jacksonville
	Noah Horchler	16	2017–18	Stetson
	Noah Horchler	16	2018–19	Southern Miss
	Alain Laroche	16	2005–06	Campbell
9	James Grimball	15	2007–08	Florida Gulf Coast
	James Grimball	15	2007–08	Savannah State
	Noah Horchler	15	2018–19	Florida National
	Noah Horchler	15	2017–18	Lipscomb

== Assists ==
Career
Rk	Player	Assists	Seasons
1	Ivan Gandia-Rosa	608	2017–18 2018–19 2019–20
2	Dallas Moore	551	2013–14 2014–15 2015–16 2016–17
3	Joe Gaetano Jr.	449	1999–00 2000–01 2001–02 2002–03
4	Chris Timberlake	396	2004–05 2005–06 2006–07 2007–08
5	Will Wilson	379	2009–10 2010–11 2011–12 2012–13
6	Chris Davenport	335	2013–14 2014–15 2015–16 2016–17
7	Jaylen Smith	259	2023–24 2024–25
8	Brad Haugabrook	245	2009–10 2010–11
9	Bobby Patton	232	1993–1994 1994–95
	Jose Placer	232	2020–21 2021–22 2022–23

Season
Rk	Player	Assists	Season
1	Ivan Gandia-Rosa	211	2019–20
2	Dallas Moore	205	2015–16
	Ivan Gandia-Rosa	205	2017–18
4	Will Wilson	195	2012–13
5	Ivan Gandia-Rosa	192	2018–19
6	Jaylen Smith	181	2024–25
7	Pershin Williams	161	2003–04
8	Joe Gaetano Jr.	147	2002–03
9	Kamrin Oriol	136	2025–26
10	Dallas Moore	135	2016–17

Single game
Rk	Player	Assists	Season	Opponent
1	Ivan Gandia-Rosa	18	2017–18	USC Upstate
2	Kamrin Oriol	15	2025–26	Bellarmine
3	Chris Davenport	13	2016–17	NJIT
	Ivan Gandia-Rosa	13	2017–18	USC Upstate
5	Ivan Gandia-Rosa	12	2019–20	Lipscomb
	Ivan Gandia-Rosa	12	2019–20	Stetson
	Jaylen Smith	12	2024–25	Central Arkansas
	Will Wilson	12	2012–13	Stetson
	Will Wilson	12	2012–13	Edward Waters
10	Ivan Gandia-Rosa	11	2017–18	Kennesaw State
	Brad Haugabrook	11	2009–10	Kennesaw State
	Dallas Moore	11	2016–17	Stetson
	Dallas Moore	11	2015–16	NJIT
	Dallas Moore	11	2016–17	Thomas University
	Chris Timberlake	11	2006–07	Jacksonville
	Will Wilson	11	2012–13	Kennesaw State
	Will Wilson	11	2012–13	Jacksonville
	Will Wilson	11	2012–13	Lipscomb

== Steals ==
Career
Rk	Player	Steals	Seasons
1	Beau Beech	147	2012–13 2013–14 2014–15 2015–16
2	Chris Timberlake	135	2004–05 2005–06 2006–07 2007–08
3	George Mccleod	125	1995–96 1996–97 1997–98 1998–99
4	Dallas Moore	123	2013–14 2014–15 2015–16 2016–17
5	Jamaal Williams	121	1994–95 1995–96 1996–97 1997–98
	Garrett Sams	121	2016–17 2017–18 2018–19 2019–20
7	Germaine Sparkes	112	2006–07 2007–08 2008–09 2009–10
8	Donny Lotz	105	2001–02 2002–03 2003–04 2004–05
9	Andy Diaz	102	2009–10 2010–11 2011–12 2012–13
10	Will Wilson	97	2009–10 2010–11 2011–12 2012–13

Season
Rk	Player	Steals	Season
1	Pershin Williams	69	2003–04
2	Brian Sitter	62	1993–94
3	Jalen Nesbitt	58	2014–15
4	George Mccleod	55	1997–98
5	Kyle Hesting	52	1995–96
	Antoine Stokes	52	1998–99
7	Jamaal Williams	50	1997–98
8	Ian Gibson	46	2006–07
	Michael Drayton	46	2002–03
10	Will Wilson	45	2012–13
	Dorian Lee	45	1992–93

Single game
Rk	Player	Steals	Season	Opponent
1	Osborn Blount	6	2017–18	FGCU
	Ian Gibson	6	2006–07	Skidmore
	Garrett Sams	6	2018–19	Florida National
4	Beau Beech	5	2014–15	Jacksonville
	Chaz Lanier	5	2023–24	Georgia Southern
	Cortez Riley	5	2008–09	ETSU
	Garrett Sams	5	2018–19	Lipscomb
	Jaylen Smith	5	2024–25	UNC Greensboro
	Chris Timberlake	5	2005–06	Florida Atlantic
	Will Wilson	5	2012–13	Florida Gulf Coast
	Will Wilson	5	2012–13	Jacksonville
	Will Wilson	5	2009–10	Notre Dame

== Blocks ==
Career
Rk	Player	Blocks	Seasons
1	Wajid Aminu	203	2016–17 2017–18 2018–19 2019–20
2	Demarcus Daniels	179	2012–13 2013–14 2014–15 2015–16
3	Chris Davenport	151	2013–14 2014–15 2015–16 2016–17
4	Matt Sauey	145	2008–09 2009–10 2010–11 2011–12
5	Dorian James	116	2018–19 2019–20 2020–21 2021–22 2022–23 2023–24
6	Jadyn Parker	114	2020–21 2021–22 2022–23
7	Noah Horchler	102	2017–18 2018–19
8	James Grimball	99	2003–04 2004–05 2006–07 2007–08
9	Andy Diaz	98	2009–10 2010–11 2011–12 2012–13
10	Romelo Banks	92	2013–14 2014–15 2015–16 2016–17

Season
Rk	Player	Blocks	Season
1	Demarcus Daniels	73	2015–16
2	Wajid Aminu	70	2019–20
3	Wajid Aminu	68	2018–19
4	Chris Davenport	65	2015–16
5	Demarcus Daniels	55	2014–15
6	Noah Horchler	54	2017–18
7	Jadyn Parker	53	2022–23
8	Jadyn Parker	49	2021–22
9	Noah Horchler	48	2018–19
	Matt Sauey	48	2009–10

Single game
Rk	Player	Blocks	Season	Opponent
1	Jadyn Parker	9	2021–22	Stetson
2	Wajid Aminu	7	2018–19	Minnesota
	James Grimball	7	2007–08	Savannah State
	Dorian James	7	2023–24	Kennesaw State
	Jadyn Parker	7	2021–22	Trinity Baptist
6	Wajid Aminu	6	2016–17	Palm Beach Atlantic
	Wajid Aminu	6	2018–19	North Alabama
	Wajid Aminu	6	2018–19	North Alabama
	Romelo Banks	6	2016–17	Edward Waters
	Demarcus Daniels	6	2014–15	Elon
	Chris Davenport	6	2015–16	USC Upstate
