= 2016–17 Jacksonville Dolphins men's basketball team =

American college basketball season

2016–17 Jacksonville Dolphins men's basketball
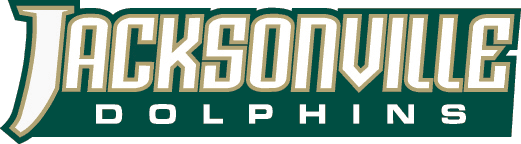

CIT, First Round
- Conference: Atlantic Sun Conference
- Record: 17–16 (5–9 ASUN)
- Head coach: Tony Jasick (3rd season)
- Assistant coach: Dan Bere'; Scott Wagers; Azeez Ali
- Home arena: Swisher Gymnasium

2016–17 ASUN men's basketball standings
	Conf.				Overall
Team	W		L	PCT	W		L	PCT
Florida Gulf Coast †	12	–	2	.857	26	–	8	.765
Lipscomb	11	–	3	.786	20	–	13	.606
North Florida	8	–	6	.571	15	–	19	.441
USC Upstate	7	–	7	.500	17	–	16	.515
Kennesaw State	7	–	7	.500	14	–	18	.438
Jacksonville	5	–	9	.357	17	–	16	.515
NJIT	3	–	11	.214	11	–	20	.355
Stetson	3	–	11	.214	11	–	21	.344
† 2017 ASUN Tournament winner

The 2016–17 Jacksonville Dolphins men's basketball team represented Jacksonville University during the 2016–17 NCAA Division I men's basketball season. The Dolphins, led by third-year head coach Tony Jasick played their home games at Swisher Gymnasium on the university's Jacksonville, Florida campus as members of the Atlantic Sun Conference. They finished the season 17–16, 5–9 in ASUN play to finish in sixth place. They lost in the quarterfinals of the ASUN tournament to North Florida. They were invited to the CollegeInsider.com Tournament where they lost in the first round to Saint Francis (PA).

== Previous season ==
The Dolphins finished the 2015–16 season 16–16, 8–6 in ASUN play to finish in a three way tie for second place. They lost in the quarterfinals of the ASUN tournament to Lipscomb.

== Roster ==
2016–17 Jacksonville Dolphins men's basketball team
Players
Coaches

Pos.	#	Name	Height	Weight	Year	Previous school	Hometown
G	0	Tanner Rubio	6 ft 0 in (1.83 m)	170 lb (77 kg)	Fr	The Master's Academy	Maitland, FL
G	2	Lee Richmond	6 ft 1 in (1.85 m)	160 lb (73 kg)	Fr	Christian Brothers College High School	St. Louis, MO
G	3	Devin Harris	6 ft 4 in (1.93 m)	200 lb (91 kg)	RS Jr	Jesuit HS; East Tennessee St.	Tampa, FL
F	5	Darius Dawkins	6 ft 7 in (2.01 m)	200 lb (91 kg)	RS Sr	Eastern Guilford HS; Coastal Bend College	McLeansville, NC
G	10	Darien Fernandez	5 ft 8 in (1.73 m)	185 lb (84 kg)	Sr	Wareham HS; Laramie County CC	Onset, MA
F	11	Omar El Manasterly	6 ft 6 in (1.98 m)	220 lb (100 kg)	Sr	Dulles High School	Alexandria, Egypt
F	13	Marcel White	6 ft 6 in (1.98 m)	220 lb (100 kg)	Sr	Vermont Academy	Lake Wales, FL
F	15	J.R. Holder	6 ft 7 in (2.01 m)	180 lb (82 kg)	Sr	Mount Zion HS	Atlanta, GA
G	20	Jordan Martin	6 ft 2 in (1.88 m)	150 lb (68 kg)	Fr	West Boca Raton Community HS	Boca Raton, FL
G	21	Tyrone Sam	6 ft 4 in (1.93 m)	195 lb (88 kg)	Jr	Roswell HS	Roswell, GA
G	22	Andris Misters	6 ft 5 in (1.96 m)	200 lb (91 kg)	Sr	St. Benedict's Prep; Western Texas College	Jelgava, Latvia
F	25	Antwon Clayton	6 ft 6 in (1.98 m)	200 lb (91 kg)	Jr	Eustis HS	Eustis, FL
F	33	Cody Helgeland	6 ft 8 in (2.03 m)	185 lb (84 kg)	RS Jr	Stephens County HS; South Georgia St.	Toccoa, GA
F	34	Demontrez Austin	6 ft 7 in (2.01 m)	210 lb (95 kg)	Sr	Effingham County HS; South Georgia St.	Guyton, GA
F	55	Damien Sears	6 ft 7 in (2.01 m)	230 lb (104 kg)	Fr	Haughton HS	Haughton, LA
F		Jace Hogan (I) (redshirt)	6 ft 6 in (1.98 m)	225 lb (102 kg)	Jr	Holy Trinity Episcopal Academy; Navy	Melbourne, FL

Head coach

- Tony Jasick (Mars Hill College)

Assistant coach(es)

- Dan Bere' (Indiana)
- Scott Wagers (Tennessee Wesleyan)
- Azeez Ali (Maryland Eastern Shore)

Legend

- (C) Team captain
- (S) Suspended
- (I) Ineligible
- (W) Walk-on
- Injured
- Current redshirt

Roster

== Schedule and results ==
Date time, TV	Rank^{#}	Opponent^{#}	Result	Record	Site (attendance) city, state
Non-conference regular season
11/12/2016*; 9:00 pm		at Denver	W 92–84	1–0	Magness Arena (2,030); Denver, CO
11/14/2016*; 9:00 pm		at Air Force	L 68–86	1–1	Clune Arena (870); Colorado Springs, CO
11/18/2016*; 5:30 pm		vs. Youngstown State; Red Diamond Roundball Classic	W 79–54	2–1	Mitchell Center (2,225); Mobile, AL
11/19/2016*; 2:30 pm		vs. FIU; Red Diamond Roundball Classic	W 78–75 ^{OT}	3–1	Mitchell Center (1,948); Mobile, AL
11/20/2016*; 3:30 pm		at South Alabama; Red Diamond Roundball Classic	L 58–71	3–2	Mitchell Center (1,823); Mobile, AL
11/23/2016*; 7:00 pm, ESPN3		Trinity Baptist	W 97–52	4–2	Swisher Gymnasium (631); Jacksonville, FL
11/26/2016*; 4:00 pm		at North Carolina A&T	W 66–49	5–2	Corbett Sports Center (481); Greensboro, NC
11/30/2016*; 7:00 pm		at Milwaukee	L 67–72	5–3	UW–Milwaukee Panther Arena (1,473); Milwaukee, WI
12/05/2016*; 8:00 pm		at Bethune–Cookman	W 76–66	6–3	ICI Center (717); Daytona Beach, FL
12/07/2016*; 7:00 pm, ESPN3		Eastern Kentucky	L 76–80	6–4	Swisher Gymnasium (1,152); Jacksonville, FL
12/10/2016*; 1:00 pm		at Marist	W 85–64	7–4	McCann Field House (1,085); Poughkeepsie, NY
12/17/2016*; 4:00 pm		at Florida A&M	W 75–72	8–4	Teaching Gym (678); Tallahassee, FL
12/19/2016*; 7:00 pm, ESPN3		Florida Memorial	W 81–63	9–4	Swisher Gymnasium (650); Jacksonville, FL
12/21/2016*; 7:00 pm		at Davidson	L 60–75	9–5	John M. Belk Arena (3,678); Davidson, NC
12/28/2016*; 7:00 pm, ESPN3		Thomas	W 93–64	10–5	Swisher Gymnasium (374); Jacksonville, FL
12/31/2016*; 7:00 pm, ESPN3		South Carolina State	W 89–85	11–5	Swisher Gymnasium (450); Jacksonville, FL
01/03/2017*; 7:00 pm, ESPN3		Middle Georgia State	W 124–85	12–5	Swisher Gymnasium (657); Jacksonville, FL
Atlantic Sun Conference regular season
01/07/2017; 7:00 pm, ESPN3		North Florida	L 64–80	12–6 (0–1)	Swisher Gymnasium (1,360); Jacksonville, FL
01/12/2017; 7:00 pm, ESPN3		at NJIT	W 82–81	13–6 (1–1)	Fleisher Center (387); Newark, NJ
01/14/2017; 2:00 pm, ESPN3		at USC Upstate	L 66–73	13–7 (1–2)	G. B. Hodge Center (479); Spartanburg, SC
01/19/2017; 7:00 pm, ESPN3		Lipscomb	L 95–112	13–8 (1–3)	Swisher Gymnasium (506); Jacksonville, FL
01/21/2017; 7:00 pm, ESPN3		Kennesaw State	L 71–81	13–9 (1–4)	Swisher Gymnasium (1,006); Jacksonville, FL
01/25/2017; 7:00 pm, ESPN3		Stetson	W 103–92	14–9 (2–4)	Swisher Gymnasium (859); Jacksonville, FL
01/28/2017; 7:00 pm, ESPN3		at Florida Gulf Coast	L 56–78	14–10 (2–5)	Alico Arena (4,402); Fort Myers, FL
01/30/2017; 7:00 pm, ESPN3		at Stetson	W 89–86	15–10 (3–5)	Edmunds Center (799); DeLand, FL
02/04/2017; 7:00 pm, ESPN3		Florida Gulf Coast	L 57–67	15–11 (3–6)	Swisher Gymnasium (1,050); Jacksonville, FL
02/09/2017; 7:00 pm, ESPN3		USC Upstate	L 67–70	15–12 (3–7)	Swisher Gymnasium (950); Jacksonville, FL
02/11/2017; 7:00 pm, ESPN3		NJIT	W 76–73	16–12 (4–7)	Swisher Gymnasium (1,176); Jacksonville, FL
02/16/2017; 7:00 pm, ESPN3		at Kennesaw State	W 79–78	17–12 (5–7)	KSU Convocation Center (453); Kennesaw, GA
02/18/2017; 4:00 pm, ESPN3		at Lipscomb	L 69–81	17–13 (5–8)	Allen Arena (2,316); Nashville, TN
02/23/2017; 7:00 pm, ESPN3		at North Florida; River City Rumble	L 69–73	17–14 (5–9)	UNF Arena (3,149); Jacksonville, FL
Atlantic Sun tournament
02/27/2017; 7:00 pm, ESPN3	(6)	at (3) North Florida; Quarterfinals	L 74–77	17–15	UNF Arena (2,938); Jacksonville, FL
CIT
03/14/2017*; 7:00 pm, Facebook Live		Saint Francis (PA); First Round; Hugh Durham Classic	L 76–78	17–16	Swisher Gymnasium (734); Jacksonville, FL
*Non-conference game. ^{#}Rankings from AP Poll. (#) Tournament seedings in parentheses. All times are in Eastern Time Source.
