= 2016–17 Kennesaw State Owls men's basketball team =

American college basketball season

2016–17 Kennesaw State Owls men's basketball
- Conference: Atlantic Sun Conference
- Record: 14–18 (7–7 ASUN)
- Head coach: Al Skinner (2nd season)
- Assistant coach: Michael Cotton; Carlton Owens; Stephen Cox
- Home arena: KSU Convocation Center

2016–17 ASUN men's basketball standings
	Conf.				Overall
Team	W		L	PCT	W		L	PCT
Florida Gulf Coast †	12	–	2	.857	26	–	8	.765
Lipscomb	11	–	3	.786	20	–	13	.606
North Florida	8	–	6	.571	15	–	19	.441
USC Upstate	7	–	7	.500	17	–	16	.515
Kennesaw State	7	–	7	.500	14	–	18	.438
Jacksonville	5	–	9	.357	17	–	16	.515
NJIT	3	–	11	.214	11	–	20	.355
Stetson	3	–	11	.214	11	–	21	.344
† 2017 ASUN Tournament winner

The 2016–17 Kennesaw State Owls men's basketball team represented Kennesaw State University during the 2016–17 NCAA Division I men's basketball season. The Owls were led by second-year head coach Al Skinner and played their home games at the KSU Convocation Center on the university's campus in Kennesaw, Georgia as members of the Atlantic Sun Conference (ASUN). They finished the season 14–18, 7–7 in ASUN play to finish in a tie for fourth place. As the No. 5 seed in the ASUN tournament, they defeated USC Upstate before losing to Florida Gulf Coast in the semifinals.

== Previous season ==
The Owls finished the 2015–16 season 11–20, 7–7 in A-Sun play to finish in a tie for fifth place. They lost in the quarterfinals of the A-Sun tournament to Florida Gulf Coast.

== Roster ==
2016–17 Kennesaw State Owls men's basketball team
Players
Coaches

Pos.	#	Name	Height	Weight	Year	Previous school	Hometown
G	0	Kendrick Ray	6 ft 2 in (1.88 m)	188 lb (85 kg)	RS Sr	Middletown HS; Quinnipiac	Middletown, NY
F	2	Jordan Jones	6 ft 8 in (2.03 m)	205 lb (93 kg)	RS Jr	St. Francis School	Alpharetta, GA
G	4	Tyler Hooker	6 ft 0 in (1.83 m)	150 lb (68 kg)	RS Fr	Moravian Prep	Simpsonville, SC
F	5	Isaac Mbuyamba	6 ft 6 in (1.98 m)	220 lb (100 kg)	Fr	Parkrose HS	Portland, OR
F	10	Johannes Nielsen	6 ft 10 in (2.08 m)	210 lb (95 kg)	Fr	Virum Skole - Skolebakken 9	Virum, Denmark
G	11	Kyle Clarke	6 ft 5 in (1.96 m)	188 lb (85 kg)	So	Oldsmar Christian School	Daytona Beach, FL
G	12	James Scott	6 ft 5 in (1.96 m)	188 lb (85 kg)	Fr	St. Benedict’s Prep	Union, NJ
F	13	Anthony Wilson	6 ft 5 in (1.96 m)	210 lb (95 kg)	Fr	Miami Central HS	Miami, FL
F	14	Aubrey Williams	6 ft 7 in (2.01 m)	230 lb (104 kg)	RS Sr	St. Vincent Pallotti HS; Toledo	Bowie, MD
G	15	Cameron Neysmith	6 ft 4 in (1.93 m)	207 lb (94 kg)	Sr	Parkview HS; Massanutten Military Academy	Norcross, GA
G	21	Nick Masterson	6 ft 6 in (1.98 m)	202 lb (92 kg)	Jr	River Ridge HS	Woodstock, GA
F	22	Shazier Lawson	6 ft 6 in (1.98 m)	220 lb (100 kg)	So	Veterans HS; Arizona State	Perry, GA
G	24	Josh Burnett	6 ft 5 in (1.96 m)	182 lb (83 kg)	So	Maryknoll School	Honolulu, HI
F	33	Kosta Jankovic	6 ft 7 in (2.01 m)	200 lb (91 kg)	So	Renaissance Academy (Los Angeles)	Belgrade, Serbia
F	35	Zach Cameron	6 ft 10 in (2.08 m)	215 lb (98 kg)	Fr	Brewster Academy	Sacramento, CA

Head coach

- Al Skinner (UMass)

Assistant coach(es)

- Michael Cotton (Boston College)
- Carlton Owens (Rhode Island)
- Stephen Cox (Clayton St.)

Legend

- (C) Team captain
- (S) Suspended
- (I) Ineligible
- (W) Walk-on
- Injured
- Current redshirt

Roster

== Schedule and results ==
Date time, TV	Rank^{#}	Opponent^{#}	Result	Record	Site (attendance) city, state
Exhibition
11/04/2016*; 7:00 pm		Georgia Southwestern	W 60–58		KSU Convocation Center (553); Kennesaw, GA
Non-conference regular season
11/11/2016*; 9:30 pm, BTN		at Iowa	L 74–91	0–1	Carver–Hawkeye Arena (13,007); Iowa City, IA
11/14/2016*; 7:00 pm, ESPN3		Brewton–Parker	W 80–74	1–1	KSU Convocation Center (1,402); Kennesaw, GA
11/16/2016*; 7:30 pm		at Bethune–Cookman	L 72–75	1–2	Ocean Center (678); Daytona Beach, FL
11/19/2016*; 3:00 pm		at UMBC	L 85–93	1–3	Retriever Activities Center (719); Catonsville, MD
11/22/2016*; 2:00 pm, ESPN3		Alabama State	W 79–72	2–3	KSU Convocation Center (937); Kennesaw, GA
11/26/2016*; 2:30 pm, ESPN3		Chattanooga	L 71–88	2–4	KSU Convocation Center (1,031); Kennesaw, GA
11/28/2016*; 7:00 pm		at South Florida	L 69–71	2–5	USF Sun Dome (2,196); Tampa, FL
11/30/2016*; 7:00 pm		at Florida A&M	W 76–74	3–5	Teaching Gym (579); Tallahassee, FL
12/03/2016*; 1:00 pm		at Michigan	L 55–82	3–6	Crisler Center (10,687); Ann Arbor, MI
12/14/2016*; 7:00 pm		at Rider; Gotham Classic	L 79–81	3–7	Alumni Gymnasium (1,612); Lawrenceville, NJ
12/17/2016*; 1:00 pm		at Massachusetts; Gotham Classic	L 77–95	3–8	Mullins Center (1,758); Amherst, MA
12/20/2016*; 10:00 pm		at Pacific; Gotham Classic	L 56–69	3–9	Stockton Arena (1,355); Stockton, CA
12/22/2016*; 2:00 pm, ESPN3		North Carolina A&T; Gotham Classic	W 68–60	4–9	KSU Convocation Center (1,074); Kennesaw, GA
12/28/2016*; 7:00 pm, ESPN3		Mercer	L 76–80	4–10	KSU Convocation Center (1,506); Kennesaw, GA
12/31/2016*; 7:00 pm, ESPN3		North Georgia	W 89–76	5–10	KSU Convocation Center (653); Kennesaw, GA
01/02/2017*; 7:00 pm		at Tennessee State	W 76–73	6–10	Gentry Complex (483); Nashville, TN
Atlantic Sun Conference regular season
01/07/2017; 5:00 pm, ESPN3		at Lipscomb	L 79–82	6–11 (0–1)	Allen Arena (1,025); Nashville, TN
01/12/2017; 7:00 pm, ESPN3		Florida Gulf Coast	L 75–78	6–12 (0–2)	KSU Convocation Center (1,851); Kennesaw, GA
01/14/2017; 4:30 pm, ESPN3		Stetson	W 84–65	7–12 (1–2)	KSU Convocation Center (751); Kennesaw, GA
01/19/2017; 7:00 pm, ESPN3		at North Florida	L 84–86	7–13 (1–3)	UNF Arena (1,605); Jacksonville, FL
01/21/2017; 7:00 pm, ESPN3		at Jacksonville	W 81–71	8–13 (2–3)	Swisher Gymnasium (1,006); Jacksonville, FL
01/25/2017; 7:00 pm, ESPN3		NJIT	W 71–65	9–13 (3–3)	KSU Convocation Center (771); Kennesaw, GA
01/28/2017; 2:00 pm, ESPN3		at USC Upstate	L 73–79	9–14 (3–4)	G. B. Hodge Center (723); Spartanburg, SC
01/30/2017; 7:00 pm, ESPN3		at NJIT	W 54–53	10–14 (4–4)	Fleisher Center (657); Newark, NJ
02/04/2017; 4:30 pm, ESPN3		USC Upstate	W 84–79	11–14 (5–4)	KSU Convocation Center (1,645); Kennesaw, GA
02/09/2017; 7:00 pm, ESPN3		at Stetson	W 92–85	12–14 (6–4)	Edmunds Center (694); DeLand, FL
02/11/2017; 7:00 pm, ESPN3		at Florida Gulf Coast	L 63–75	12–15 (6–5)	Alico Arena (4,670); Fort Myers, FL
02/16/2017; 7:00 pm, ESPN3		Jacksonville	L 78–79	12–16 (6–6)	KSU Convocation Center (453); Kennesaw, GA
02/18/2017; 4:30 pm, ESPN3		North Florida	W 85–68	13–16 (7–6)	KSU Convocation Center (1,362); Kennesaw, GA
02/23/2017; 7:00 pm, ESPN3		Lipscomb	L 74–85	13–17 (7–7)	KSU Convocation Center (1,355); Kennesaw, GA
Atlantic Sun tournament
02/27/2017; 7:00 pm, ESPN3	(5)	at (4) USC Upstate; Quarterfinals	W 80–78	14–17	G. B. Hodge Center (735); Spartanburg, SC
03/02/2017; 7:00 pm, ESPN3	(5)	at (1) Florida Gulf Coast; Semifinals	L 62–74	14–18	Alico Arena (4,333); Fort Myers, FL
*Non-conference game. ^{#}Rankings from AP Poll. (#) Tournament seedings in parentheses. All times are in Eastern Time Source.
