= 2016–17 NJIT Highlanders men's basketball team =

American college basketball season

2016–17 NJIT Highlanders men's basketball
- Conference: Atlantic Sun Conference
- Record: 11–20 (3–11 ASUN)
- Head coach: Brian Kennedy (1st season)
- Assistant coach: Jeff Rafferty; Kevin Driscoll; Kim Waiters
- Home arena: Fleisher Center (cap. 1600)

2016–17 ASUN men's basketball standings
	Conf.				Overall
Team	W		L	PCT	W		L	PCT
Florida Gulf Coast †	12	–	2	.857	26	–	8	.765
Lipscomb	11	–	3	.786	20	–	13	.606
North Florida	8	–	6	.571	15	–	19	.441
USC Upstate	7	–	7	.500	17	–	16	.515
Kennesaw State	7	–	7	.500	14	–	18	.438
Jacksonville	5	–	9	.357	17	–	16	.515
NJIT	3	–	11	.214	11	–	20	.355
Stetson	3	–	11	.214	11	–	21	.344
† 2017 ASUN Tournament winner

The 2016–17 NJIT Highlanders men's basketball team represented the New Jersey Institute of Technology during the 2016–17 NCAA Division I men's basketball season. The Highlanders, led by first-year head coach Brian Kennedy, played their home games at the Fleisher Center in Newark, New Jersey as members of the Atlantic Sun Conference (ASUN). They finished the season 11–20, 3–11 in ASUN play to finish in a tie for seventh place. They lost in the quarterfinals of the ASUN tournament to Lipscomb.

This season was the Highlanders' final season playing at Fleisher Center. The school opened the new Wellness and Events Center for the 2017–18 season.

== Previous season ==
The Highlanders finished the 2015–16 season 20–15, 8–6 in A-Sun play to finish in to finish in a three-way tie for second place. They lost in the quarterfinals of the A-Sun tournament to Stetson. They were invited to the CollegeInsider.com Tournament where they defeated Army, Boston University, and Texas–Arlington to advance to the semifinals where they lost to Columbia.

On April 1, 2016 head coach Jim Engles resigned to become the head coach at Columbia. He finished at NJIT with an eight-year record of 111–139. On April 13, the school hired assistant Brian Kennedy as head coach.

== Roster ==
2016–17 NJIT Highlanders men's basketball team
Players
Coaches

Pos.	#	Name	Height	Weight	Year	Hometown
F	0	Abdul Lewis	6 ft 10 in (2.08 m)	225 lb (102 kg)	RS So	Newark, NJ
F	1	Taj Price	6 ft 7 in (2.01 m)	210 lb (95 kg)	Fr	Newark, NJ
G	2	Tim Coleman	6 ft 5 in (1.96 m)	210 lb (95 kg)	RS Sr	Union, NJ
G/F	3	Chris Jenkins	6 ft 4 in (1.93 m)	215 lb (98 kg)	RS Jr	Hillside, NJ
G	5	Damon Lynn (injured)	5 ft 11 in (1.8 m)	165 lb (75 kg)	Sr	Hillside, NJ
G	11	Shyquan Gibbs	6 ft 1 in (1.85 m)	150 lb (68 kg)	Fr	Hillside, NJ
G/F	12	Anthony Tarke	6 ft 6 in (1.98 m)	205 lb (93 kg)	Fr	Gaithersburg, MD
G	14	Reilly Walsh	6 ft 3 in (1.91 m)	180 lb (82 kg)	So	Staten Island, NY
G	15	James McMillon	6 ft 1 in (1.85 m)	185 lb (84 kg)	Jr	Newark, NJ
G/F	21	Ron Alston	6 ft 6 in (1.98 m)	195 lb (88 kg)	Fr	Alexandria, VA
G	23	Osa Izevbuwa	6 ft 3 in (1.91 m)	230 lb (104 kg)	Sr	Staten Island, NY
G	25	Rob Ukawuba	6 ft 4 in (1.93 m)	210 lb (95 kg)	Sr	East Brunswick, NJ
G	32	Donovan Greer	6 ft 3 in (1.91 m)	165 lb (75 kg)	So	Houston, TX
F	34	Mohamed Bendary	6 ft 9 in (2.06 m)	235 lb (107 kg)	So	Jersey City, NJ

Head coach

- Brian Kennedy (Monmouth)

Assistant coach(es)

- Jeff Rafferty (Springfield)
- Kevin Driscoll (Misericordia)
- Kim Waiters (Robert Morris)

Legend

- (C) Team captain
- (S) Suspended
- (I) Ineligible
- (W) Walk-on
- Injured
- Current redshirt

Roster
Last update: Feb 11, 2017

== Schedule and results ==
Date time, TV	Rank^{#}	Opponent^{#}	Result	Record	Site (attendance) city, state
Non-conference regular season
11/11/2016*; 7:45 pm, ESPN3		Sarah Lawrence	W 100–38	1–0	Fleisher Center (800); Newark, NJ
11/14/2016*; 9:00 pm		at Utah State; Cancún Challenge	L 84–93	1–1	Smith Spectrum (8,584); Logan, UT
11/17/2016*; 7:00 pm		at Lafayette	L 83–84 ^{OT}	1–2	Kirby Sports Center (1,539); Easton, PA
11/19/2016*; 4:00 pm, ESPN3		Colgate	W 74–68	2–2	Fleisher Center (802); Newark, NJ
11/22/2016*; 12:30 pm, YouTube		vs. Georgia State; Cancun Challenge	L 53–74	2–3	Hard Rock Hotel Riviera Maya (1,610); Cancun, Mexico
11/23/2016*; 12:30 pm, YouTube		vs. Idaho State; Cancun Challenge	W 71–67	3–3	Hard Rock Hotel Riviera Maya (1,610); Cancun, Mexico
11/26/2016*; 3:30 pm, ESPN3		at No. 17 Purdue; Cancun Challenge	L 68–79	3–4	Mackey Arena (10,479); West Lafayette, IN
11/30/2016*; 7:00 pm, ESPN3		Saint Francis (PA)	W 83–70	4–4	Fleisher Center (752); Newark, NJ
12/03/2016*; 2:00 pm		at UMass Lowell	W 75–74	5–4	Tsongas Center (1,267); Lowell, MA
12/06/2016*; 8:00 pm, BTN		at Minnesota	L 68–74	5–5	Williams Arena (8,189); Minneapolis, MN
12/10/2016*; 7:00 pm		at Kent State	L 71–87	5–6	MAC Center (2,388); Kent, OH
12/14/2016*; 7:00 pm		at Iona	L 80–94	5–7	Hynes Athletic Center (1,107); New Rochelle, NY
12/17/2016*; 2:00 pm		at Temple	L 63–68	5–8	Liacouras Center (4,934); Philadelphia, PA
12/22/2016*; 4:00 pm		Dean	W 92–50	6–8	Fleisher Center (400); Newark, NJ
12/28/2016*; 7:00 pm		at Stony Brook	W 64–61	7–8	Island Federal Credit Union Arena (3,130); Stony Brook, NY
01/04/2017*; 7:00 pm, ESPN3		Brown	W 75–73	8–8	Fleisher Center (475); Newark, NJ
Atlantic Sun Conference regular season
01/07/2017; 2:00 pm, ESPN3		at USC Upstate	L 65–75	8–9 (0–1)	G. B. Hodge Center (354); Spartanburg, SC
01/12/2017; 7:00 pm, ESPN3		Jacksonville	L 81–82	8–10 (0–2)	Fleisher Center (387); Newark, NJ
01/14/2017; 4:00 pm, ESPN3		North Florida	W 84–78	9–10 (1–2)	Fleisher Center (812); Newark, NJ
01/19/2017; 7:00 pm, ESPN3		at Stetson	L 76–82	9–11 (1–3)	Edmunds Center (985); DeLand, FL
01/21/2017; 7:00 pm, ESPN3		at Florida Gulf Coast	L 71–84	9–12 (1–4)	Alico Arena (4,545); Fort Myers, FL
01/25/2017; 7:00 pm, ESPN3		at Kennesaw State	L 65–71	9–13 (1–5)	KSU Convocation Center (771); Kennesaw, GA
01/28/2017; 4:00 pm, ESPN3		Lipscomb	L 62–66	9–14 (1–6)	Fleisher Center (599); Newark, NJ
01/30/2017; 7:00 pm, ESPN3		Kennesaw State	L 53–54	9–15 (1–7)	Fleisher Center (657); Newark, NJ
02/04/2017; 5:00 pm, ESPN3		at Lipscomb	L 63–87	9–16 (1–8)	Allen Arena (1,737); Nashville, TN
02/09/2017; 7:00 pm, ESPN3		at North Florida	L 69–91	9–17 (1–9)	UNF Arena (2,011); Jacksonville, FL
02/11/2017; 7:00 pm, ESPN3		at Jacksonville	L 73–76	9–18 (1–10)	Swisher Gymnasium (1,176); Jacksonville, FL
02/16/2017; 7:00 pm, ESPN3		Florida Gulf Coast	L 73–80	9–19 (1–11)	Fleisher Center (577); Newark, NJ
02/18/2017; 4:00 pm, ESPN3		Stetson	W 60–56	10–19 (2–11)	Fleisher Center (755); Newark, NJ
02/23/2017; 7:00 pm, ESPN3		USC Upstate	W 88–87	11–19 (3–11)	Fleisher Center (677); Newark, NJ
Atlantic Sun Tournament
02/27/2017; 8:00 pm, ESPN3	(7)	at (2) Lipscomb; Quarterfinals	L 66–97	11–20	Allen Arena (2,456); Nashville, TN
*Non-conference game. ^{#}Rankings from AP Poll. (#) Tournament seedings in parentheses. All times are in Eastern Time Source.
