= 2016–17 Florida Gulf Coast Eagles men's basketball team =

American college basketball season

2016–17 Florida Gulf Coast Eagles men's basketball
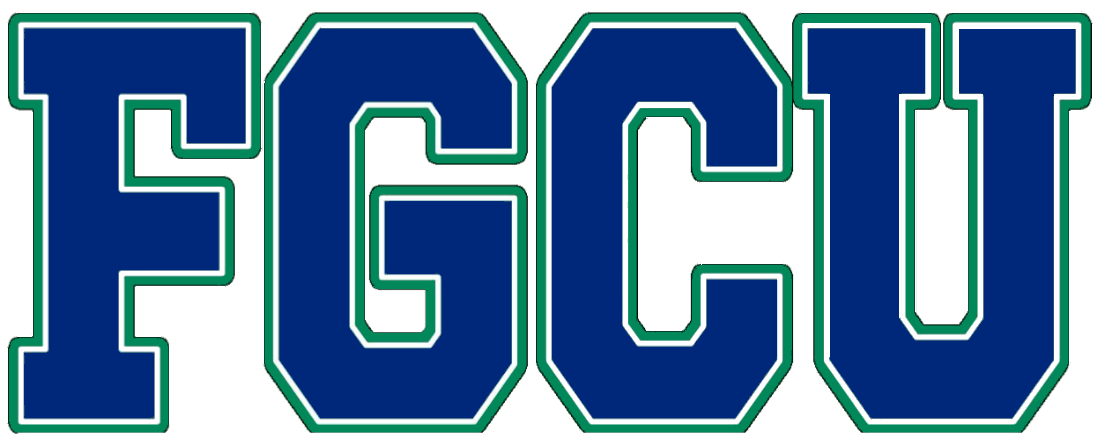

Atlantic Sun regular season and tournament champions

NCAA tournament, First Round
- Conference: Atlantic Sun Conference
- Record: 26–8 (12–2 A-Sun)
- Head coach: Joe Dooley (4th season)
- Assistant coaches: Michael Fly (6th season); Tom Abatemarco (2nd season); Aaron Miles (1st season)
- Home arena: Alico Arena

2016–17 ASUN men's basketball standings
	Conf.				Overall
Team	W		L	PCT	W		L	PCT
Florida Gulf Coast †	12	–	2	.857	26	–	8	.765
Lipscomb	11	–	3	.786	20	–	13	.606
North Florida	8	–	6	.571	15	–	19	.441
USC Upstate	7	–	7	.500	17	–	16	.515
Kennesaw State	7	–	7	.500	14	–	18	.438
Jacksonville	5	–	9	.357	17	–	16	.515
NJIT	3	–	11	.214	11	–	20	.355
Stetson	3	–	11	.214	11	–	21	.344
† 2017 ASUN Tournament winner

The 2016–17 Florida Gulf Coast Eagles men's basketball team represented Florida Gulf Coast University (FGCU) in the 2016–17 NCAA Division I men's basketball season. FGCU played their home games at Alico Arena in Fort Myers, Florida and were led by fourth-year head coach Joe Dooley as members of the Atlantic Sun Conference. They finished the regular season 26–8, 12–2 in ASUN play to win the regular season championship. As the No. 1 seed in the ASUN tournament, they defeated Stetson, Kennesaw State, and North Florida to win the tournament championship. As a result, they received the conference's automatic bid to the NCAA tournament where they lost in the first round to Florida State.

== Previous season ==
The Eagles finished the 2015–16 season 21–14, 8–6 in A-Sun play to finish in a three-way tie for second place. They defeated Kennesaw State, North Florida, and Stetson to win the A-Sun tournament. As a result, they received the conference's automatic bid to the NCAA tournament as a No. 16 seed where they defeated fellow No. 16 seed Fairleigh Dickinson in the First Four. The Eagles advanced to the first round where they lost to No. 1 seed North Carolina.

== Preseason ==
Departures

Name	Number	Pos.	Height	Weight	Year	Notes
Julian DeBose	3	G	6'4"	197	RS Senior	Graduated
Brian Green Jr.	14	G	6'3"	210	RS Junior	Transferred to Chicago State
Filip Cvjetivanin	15	F	6'9"	218	RS Senior	Graduated
Alvin Cunningham	22	G	6'4"	195	Junior	walk-on; Transferred
Patson Siame	41	F	6'11"	236	RS Junior	Transferred
Senque Carey						Hired by Long Beach State

Arrivals

Player	Previous Institution
Ricky Doyle	Michigan
C.J. Williamson	Texas Tech

Class of 2016 Signees

College recruiting information
Name	Hometown	School	Height	Weight	Commit date
RaySean Scott Jr. SF	Compton, CA	Compton High School	6 ft 7 in (2.01 m)	210 lb (95 kg)	Sep 2, 2015
RaySean Scott Jr. SF	Recruit ratings: Scout: (67)				
Christian Carlyle; SG	Jacksonville, FL	Bishop Kenny High School	6 ft 5 in (1.96 m)	210 lb (95 kg)	Aug 30, 2015
Christian Carlyle; SG	Recruit ratings: No ratings found				
Overall recruit ranking:
Note: In many cases, Scout, Rivals, 247Sports, On3, and ESPN may conflict in their listings of height and weight.; In these cases, the average was taken. ESPN grades are on a 100-point scale.; Sources: "2016 Florida Gulf Coast Signees". ESPN.; "2016 Team Ranking". Rivals.

== Roster ==
2016–17 Florida Gulf Coast Eagles men's basketball team
Players
Coaches

Pos.	#	Name	Height	Weight	Year	Previous school	Hometown
G	0	Brandon Goodwin	6 ft 2 in (1.88 m)	180 lb (82 kg)	RS Jr	Norcross/UCF	Norcross, GA
G	1	Reggie Reid	5 ft 11 in (1.8 m)	162 lb (73 kg)	So	Harlem High School	Harlem, GA
G	2	Joshua Ko (W)	6 ft 1 in (1.85 m)	167 lb (76 kg)	RS Jr	Kalaheo/Pittsburg	Kailua, HI
G	3	Rayjon Tucker	6 ft 5 in (1.96 m)	205 lb (93 kg)	So	Northside Christian Academy	Charlotte, NC
G	4	Maxx Bleecher (W)	6 ft 2 in (1.88 m)	180 lb (82 kg)	So	West Boca Raton	Boca Raton, FL
G	5	Zach Johnson	6 ft 2 in (1.88 m)	195 lb (88 kg)	RS So	Miami Norland	Miami, FL
F	10	Kevin Mickle	6 ft 7 in (2.01 m)	220 lb (100 kg)	RS Jr	Saint Benedict's Prep/Broward College	Brooklyn, NY
G	11	Christian Terrell	6 ft 5 in (1.96 m)	187 lb (85 kg)	Jr	Providence School	Jacksonville, FL
G	12	C.J. Williamson (SI) (redshirt)	6 ft 6 in (1.98 m)	200 lb (91 kg)	So	Evans/Texas Tech	Orlando, FL
F	13	RaySean Scott Jr.	6 ft 7 in (2.01 m)	213 lb (97 kg)	Fr	Compton	Compton, CA
F	15	Ricky Doyle (I) (redshirt)	6 ft 10 in (2.08 m)	253 lb (115 kg)	So	Bishop Verot/Michigan	Cape Coral, FL
F	21	Demetris Morant	6 ft 9 in (2.06 m)	209 lb (95 kg)	RS Sr	Bishop Gorman/UNLV	Las Vegas, NV
G	23	Christian Carlyle	6 ft 5 in (1.96 m)	210 lb (95 kg)	Fr	Bishop Kenny	Jacksonville, FL
F	25	Marc-Eddy Norelia	6 ft 8 in (2.03 m)	218 lb (99 kg)	RS Sr	Olympia High School/Tulane	Orlando, FL
F	32	Antravious Simmons	6 ft 9 in (2.06 m)	250 lb (113 kg)	RS Jr	South Miami High School/VCU	Miami, FL
G	33	Dolan Mahoney (W)	6 ft 2 in (1.88 m)	185 lb (84 kg)	So	IMG Academy	Bradenton, FL

Head coach

- Joe Dooley (George Washington)

Assistant coach(es)

- Michael Fly (Kentucky)
- Tom Abatemarco (Dowling)
- Aaron Miles (Kansas)

Legend

- (C) Team captain
- (S) Suspended
- (I) Ineligible
- (W) Walk-on
- Injured
- Current redshirt

Roster
Last update: Feb 18, 2017

== Schedule and results ==
Date time, TV	Rank^{#}	Opponent^{#}	Result	Record	High points	High rebounds	High assists	Site (attendance) city, state
Non-conference regular season
Nov 11, 2016*; 7:30 pm, SCEN+		at Florida	L 59–80	0–1	14 – Goodwin	9 – Morant	2 – Tied	Jacksonville Veterans Memorial Arena (5,212); Jacksonville, FL
Nov 16, 2016*; 7:00 pm		UT Arlington	W 85–72	1–1	24 – Tied	8 – Morant	3 – Johnson	Alico Arena (4,415); Fort Myers, FL
Nov 18, 2016*; 8:00 pm, FSN		at Baylor; Battle 4 Atlantis	L 72–81	1–2	22 – Goodwin	6 – Mickle	4 – Johnson	Ferrell Center (5,906); Waco, TX
Nov 20, 2016*; 7:00 pm, BTN		at No. 13 Michigan State; Battle 4 Atlantis	L 77–78	1–3	18 – Tied	12 – Simmons	7 – Terrell	Breslin Center (14,797); East Lansing, MI
Nov 23, 2016*; 7:00 pm		Binghamton; Battle 4 Atlantis	W 69–53	2–3	12 – Terrell	6 – Morant	5 – Tied	Alico Arena (3,684); Fort Myers, FL
Nov 25, 2016*; 8:00 pm		Long Beach State; Battle 4 Atlantis	W 68–67 ^{OT}	3–3	21 – Johnson	9 – Morant	7 – Terrell	Alico Arena (3,291); Fort Myers, FL
Nov 29, 2016*; 7:00 pm		Ave Maria	W 120–60	4–3	19 – Goodwin	5 – Tied	7 – Reid	Alico Arena (3,004); Fort Myers, FL
Dec 4, 2016*; 3:00 pm		at Georgia Southern	W 85–82	5–3	17 – Terrell	12 – Simmons	10 – Goodwin	Hanner Fieldhouse (1,519); Statesboro, GA
Dec 9, 2016*; 8:00 pm		Siena	W 73–69	6–3	16 – Morant	8 – Norelia	3 – Tied	Alico Arena (4,213); Fort Myers, FL
Dec 11, 2016*; 8:15 pm		FIU	W 82–63	7–3	18 – Goodwin	8 – Morant	5 – Reid	Alico Arena (3,112); Fort Myers, FL
Dec 13, 2016*; 7:00 pm		Georgia Southern	L 59–72	7–4	13 – Tied	17 – Morant	3 – Goodwin	Alico Arena (3,057); Fort Myers, FL
Dec 17, 2016*; 2:00 pm		at La Salle	L 80–84	7–5	26 – Goodwin	7 – Tied	4 – Goodwin	Tom Gola Arena (1,220); Philadelphia, PA
Dec 20, 2016*; 7:30 pm		at Louisiana Tech	W 79–78	8–5	26 – Goodwin	12 – Morant	5 – Goodwin	Thomas Assembly Center (2,277); Ruston, LA
Dec 22, 2016*; 7:00 pm		Florida National	W 107–50	9–5	18 – Simmons	11 – Morant	9 – Reid	Alico Arena (3,412); Fort Myers, FL
Dec 28, 2016*; 7:00 pm		at Florida Atlantic	W 75–62	10–5	20 – Terrell	9 – Morant	4 – Goodwin	FAU Arena (1,394); Boca Raton, FL
Dec 31, 2016*; 1:00 pm		Florida Tech	W 101–49	11–5	20 – Morant	9 – Morant	6 – Tied	Alico Arena (3,204); Fort Myers, FL
Atlantic Sun Conference regular season
Jan 7, 2017; 4:00 pm		at Stetson	W 89–88	12–5 (1–0)	20 – Goodwin	7 – Tied	7 – Goodwin	Edmunds Center (1,207); DeLand, FL
Jan 12, 2017; 7:00 pm		at Kennesaw State	W 78–75	13–5 (2–0)	21 – Norelia	12 – Morant	4 – Terrell	KSU Convocation Center (1,851); Kennesaw, GA
Jan 14, 2017; 5:00 pm		at Lipscomb	W 84–80	14–5 (3–0)	23 – Johnson	9 – Morant	5 – Goodwin	Allen Arena (1,471); Nashville, TN
Jan 19, 2017; 7:00 pm		USC Upstate	L 60–62	14–6 (3–1)	12 – Goodwin	9 – Morant	2 – Tied	Alico Arena (4,582); Fort Myers, FL
Jan 21, 2017; 7:00 pm		NJIT	W 84–71	15–6 (4–1)	21 – Goodwin	6 – Goodwin	6 – Johnson	Alico Arena (4,545); Fort Myers, FL
Jan 25, 2017; 7:00 pm		at North Florida	W 86–82	16–6 (5–1)	17 – Terrell	8 – Norelia	4 – Goodwin	UNF Arena (2,649); Jacksonville, FL
Jan 28, 2017; 7:00 pm		Jacksonville	W 78–56	17–6 (6–1)	25 – Morant	17 – Morant	7 – Goodwin	Alico Arena (4,402); Fort Myers, FL
Jan 30, 2017; 7:00 pm		North Florida	W 74–59	18–6 (7–1)	29 – Goodwin	13 – Morant	4 – Tied	Alico Arena (4,107); Fort Myers, FL
Feb 4, 2017; 7:00 pm		at Jacksonville	W 67–57	19–6 (8–1)	24 – Goodwin	10 – Goodwin	4 – Goodwin	Swisher Gymnasium (1,050); Jacksonville, FL
Feb 9, 2017; 7:00 pm		Lipscomb	L 60–65	19–7 (8–2)	17 – Norelia	11 – Norelia	3 – Reid	Alico Arena (4,412); Fort Myers, FL
Feb 11, 2017; 7:00 pm		Kennesaw State	W 75–63	20–7 (9–2)	24 – Goodwin	7 – Morant	3 – Tied	Alico Arena (4,670); Fort Myers, FL
Feb 16, 2017; 7:00 pm		at NJIT	W 80–73	21–7 (10–2)	24 – Goodwin	9 – Morant	6 – Terrell	Fleisher Center (577); Newark, NJ
Feb 18, 2017; 2:00 pm		at USC Upstate	W 97–89 ^{OT}	22–7 (11–2)	29 – Goodwin	9 – Simmons	4 – Johnson	G. B. Hodge Center (837); Spartanburg, SC
Feb 23, 2017; 7:00 pm		Stetson	W 80–70	23–7 (12–2)	24 – Johnson	10 – Morant	4 – Terrell	Alico Arena (4,700); Fort Myers, FL
Atlantic Sun tournament
Feb 27, 2017; 7:00 pm, ESPN3	(1)	(8) Stetson; Quarterfinals	W 87–57	24–7	19 – Johnson	15 – Norelia	8 – Goodwin	Alico Arena (4,633); Fort Myers, FL
Mar 2, 2017; 7:00 pm, ESPN3	(1)	(5) Kennesaw State; Semifinals	W 74–62	25–7	28 – Goodwin	10 – Norelia	3 – Tied	Alico Arena (4,333); Fort Myers, FL
Mar 5, 2017; 3:00 pm, ESPN	(1)	(3) North Florida; Championship	W 77–61	26–7	19 – Goodwin	8 – Norelia	7 – Goodwin	Alico Arena (4,711); Fort Myers, FL
NCAA tournament
Mar 16, 2017*; 9:20 pm, TNT	(14 W)	vs. (3 W) No. 16 Florida State; First Round	L 80–86	26–8	28 – Goodwin	6 – Norelia	7 – Goodwin	Amway Center (15,869); Orlando, FL
*Non-conference game. ^{#}Rankings from AP Poll. (#) Tournament seedings in parentheses. W=West Region. All times are in Eastern Time.
