= 2016–17 USC Upstate Spartans men's basketball team =

American college basketball season

2016–17 USC Upstate Spartans men's basketball

CIT, First Round
- Conference: Atlantic Sun Conference
- Record: 17–16 (7–7 ASUN)
- Head coach: Eddie Payne (15th season)
- Assistant coach: Kyle Perry; Kente Hart; Josh Chavis
- Home arena: G. B. Hodge Center

2016–17 ASUN men's basketball standings
	Conf.				Overall
Team	W		L	PCT	W		L	PCT
Florida Gulf Coast †	12	–	2	.857	26	–	8	.765
Lipscomb	11	–	3	.786	20	–	13	.606
North Florida	8	–	6	.571	15	–	19	.441
USC Upstate	7	–	7	.500	17	–	16	.515
Kennesaw State	7	–	7	.500	14	–	18	.438
Jacksonville	5	–	9	.357	17	–	16	.515
NJIT	3	–	11	.214	11	–	20	.355
Stetson	3	–	11	.214	11	–	21	.344
† 2017 ASUN Tournament winner

The 2016–17 USC Upstate Spartans men's basketball team represented the University of South Carolina Upstate during the 2016–17 NCAA Division I men's basketball season. The Spartans, led by 15th-year head coach Eddie Payne, played their home games at the G. B. Hodge Center in Spartanburg, South Carolina as members of the Atlantic Sun Conference. They finished the season 17–16, 7–7 in ASUN play to finish in a tie for fourth place. They lost in the quarterfinals of the ASUN tournament to Kennesaw State. They were invited to the CollegeInsider.com Tournament where they lost in the first round to Furman.

This would be Eddie Payne's final season as head coach at USC Upstate, as he announced his retirement On October 3, 2017.

== Previous season ==
The Spartans finished the 2015–16 season 10–22, 4–10 in A-Sun play to finish in a tie for seventh place. They lost in the quarterfinals of the A-Sun tournament to North Florida.

== Roster ==
2016–17 USC Upstate Spartans men's basketball team
Players
Coaches

Pos.	#	Name	Height	Weight	Year	Previous school	Hometown
G	1	Mike Cunningham	6 ft 1 in (1.85 m)	190 lb (86 kg)	RS So	DuVal HS	Washington, D.C.
G	3	Jure Span	6 ft 4 in (1.93 m)	165 lb (75 kg)	So	Combine Academy	Litija, Slovenia
F	4	Ramel Thompkins	6 ft 6 in (1.98 m)	195 lb (88 kg)	Jr	Vidalia Comprehensive HS	Vidalia, GA
G	5	Tim Hart	6 ft 3 in (1.91 m)	175 lb (79 kg)	Fr	Hebron HS	Plano, TX
F	10	Josh Cuthbertson	6 ft 5 in (1.96 m)	185 lb (84 kg)	Sr	West Craven HS	New Bern, NC
G	11	Deion Holmes	6 ft 3 in (1.91 m)	180 lb (82 kg)	Jr	Chesnee HS	Chesnee, SC
F	13	Carson Smith	6 ft 6 in (1.98 m)	200 lb (91 kg)	Jr	Brunswick CC	Fort Mill, SC
F	15	Philip Whittington	6 ft 9 in (2.06 m)	215 lb (98 kg)	So	Northside HS	Columbus, GA
G	21	Blake Edwards	6 ft 0 in (1.83 m)	180 lb (82 kg)	So	Chapin HS	Chapin, SC
G	23	Thomas Booker	6 ft 3 in (1.91 m)	175 lb (79 kg)	Fr	Bowling Green HS	Bowling Green, KY
F	24	Malik Moore	6 ft 6 in (1.98 m)	190 lb (86 kg)	So	Clyde A. Erwin HS	Asheville, NC
F	25	Nick Kornieck	6 ft 7 in (2.01 m)	205 lb (93 kg)	Fr	Coronado HS	Henderson, NV
F	33	Jacob Schulte	6 ft 7 in (2.01 m)	230 lb (104 kg)	Jr	Newport Central Catholic HS	Newport, KY
C	44	Michael Buchanan	7 ft 0 in (2.13 m)	285 lb (129 kg)	Sr	Palo Verde HS	Las Vegas, NV

Head coach

- Eddie Payne (Wake Forest)

Assistant coach(es)

- Kyle Perry (Georgia Tech)
- Kente' Hart (Carson–Newman)
- Josh Chavis (USC Upstate)

Legend

- (C) Team captain
- (S) Suspended
- (I) Ineligible
- (W) Walk-on
- Injured
- Current redshirt

Roster

== Schedule and results ==
Date time, TV	Rank^{#}	Opponent^{#}	Result	Record	Site (attendance) city, state
Non-conference regular season
11/12/2016*; 12:00 noon, FS2		at Georgetown	L 60–105	0–1	Verizon Center (8,076); Washington, D.C.
11/14/2016*; 7:00 pm		Mars Hill	W 91–66	1–1	Hodge Center (743); Spartanburg, SC
11/17/2016*; 7:00 pm, ESPN3		UNC Asheville	L 57–73	1–2	Hodge Center (537); Spartanburg, SC
11/19/2016*; 5:30 pm		at Charleston Southern	W 79–77	2–2	CSU Field House (616); Charleston, SC
11/22/2016*; 7:00 pm		at Charlotte	W 108–103 ^{OT}	3–2	Dale F. Halton Arena (3,570); Charlotte, NC
11/27/2016*; 4:00 pm		at College of Charleston	L 60–72	3–3	TD Arena (2,892); Charleston, SC
11/29/2016*; 8:00 pm		at Auburn	L 83–90	3–4	Auburn Arena (6,504); Auburn, AL
12/02/2016*; 7:00 pm		vs. Campbell; Holy City Hoops Classic	W 80–73 ^{OT}	4–4	McAlister Field House (270); Charleston, SC
12/03/2016*; 12:00 pm		at The Citadel; Holy City Hoops Classic	L 92–97	4–5	McAlister Field House (909); Charleston, SC
12/04/2016*; 1:00 pm		vs. Colgate; Holy City Hoops Classic	W 71–65	5–5	McAlister Field House (212); Charleston, SC
12/10/2016*; 2:00 pm		UVA Wise; Holy City Hoops Classic	W 99–67	6–5	Hodge Center (337); Spartanburg, SC
12/13/2016*; 7:00 pm, ESPN3		Presbyterian	W 76–48	7–5	Hodge Center (572); Spartanburg, SC
12/15/2016*; 8:00 pm		at Alabama	L 61–78	7–6	Coleman Coliseum (9,773); Tuscaloosa, AL
12/18/2016*; 3:00 pm, ESPN3		Jacksonville State	L 66–67	7–7	Hodge Center (512); Spartanburg, SC
12/20/2016*; 7:00 pm		Florida College	W 91–59	8–7	Hodge Center (402); Spartanburg, SC
12/30/2016*; 2:00 pm		Allen	W 93–67	9–7	Hodge Center (837); Spartanburg, SC
01/02/2017*; 7:30 pm		at UMKC	W 84–75	10–7	Municipal Auditorium (1,170); Kansas City, MO
Atlantic Sun Conference regular season
01/07/2017; 2:00 pm, ESPN3		NJIT	W 75–65	11–7 (1–0)	Hodge Center (354); Spartanburg, SC
01/12/2017; 7:00 pm, ESPN3		North Florida	L 65–73	11–8 (1–1)	Hodge Center (646); Spartanburg, SC
01/14/2017; 2:00 pm, ESPN3		Jacksonville	W 73–66	12–8 (2–1)	Hodge Center (479); Spartanburg, SC
01/19/2017; 7:00 pm, ESPN3		at Florida Gulf Coast	W 62–60	13–8 (3–1)	Alico Arena (4,582); Fort Myers, FL
01/21/2017; 4:00 pm, ESPN3		at Stetson	W 97–86	14–8 (4–1)	Edmunds Center (960); DeLand, FL
01/25/2017; 7:00 pm, ESPN3		at Lipscomb	L 77–84	14–9 (4–2)	Allen Arena (1,046); Nashville, TN
01/28/2017; 2:00 pm, ESPN3		Kennesaw State	W 79–73	15–9 (5–2)	Hodge Center (723); Spartanburg, SC
01/30/2017; 7:00 pm, ESPN3		Lipscomb	L 80–92	15–10 (5–3)	Hodge Center (683); Spartanburg, SC
02/04/2017; 4:30 pm, ESPN3		at Kennesaw State	L 79–84	15–11 (5–4)	KSU Convocation Center (1,645); Kennesaw, GA
02/09/2017; 7:00 pm, ESPN3		at Jacksonville	W 70–67	16–11 (6–4)	Swisher Gymnasium (950); Jacksonville, FL
02/11/2017; 7:00 pm, ESPN3		at North Florida	W 84–71	17–11 (7–4)	UNF Arena (3,181); Jacksonville, FL
02/16/2017; 7:00 pm, ESPN3		Stetson	L 72–83	17–12 (7–5)	Hodge Center (517); Spartanburg, SC
02/18/2017; 2:00 pm, ESPN3		Florida Gulf Coast	L 89–97 ^{OT}	17–13 (7–6)	Hodge Center (837); Spartanburg, SC
02/23/2017; 7:00 pm, ESPN3		at NJIT	L 87–88	17–14 (7–7)	Fleisher Center (677); Newark, NJ
Atlantic Sun tournament
02/27/2017; 7:00 pm, ESPN3	(4)	(5) Kennesaw State; Quarterfinals	L 78–80	17–15	Hodge Center (735); Spartanburg, SC
CIT
03/16/2017*; 7:00 pm, Facebook Live		Furman; First Round	L 57–79	17–16	Hodge Center (662); Spartanburg, SC
*Non-conference game. ^{#}Rankings from AP poll. (#) Tournament seedings in parentheses. All times are in Eastern Time Source.
