= 2017 ASUN men's basketball tournament =

Collegiate basketball tournament in the United States

- Classification: Division I
- Season: 2016–17
- Teams: 8
- Site: campus sites
- Champions: Florida Gulf Coast (3rd title)
- Winning coach: Joe Dooley (2nd title)
- MVP: Brandon Goodwin (Florida Gulf Coast)
- Television: ESPN

2016–17 ASUN men's basketball standings
	Conf.				Overall
Team	W		L	PCT	W		L	PCT
Florida Gulf Coast †	12	–	2	.857	26	–	8	.765
Lipscomb	11	–	3	.786	20	–	13	.606
North Florida	8	–	6	.571	15	–	19	.441
USC Upstate	7	–	7	.500	17	–	16	.515
Kennesaw State	7	–	7	.500	14	–	18	.438
Jacksonville	5	–	9	.357	17	–	16	.515
NJIT	3	–	11	.214	11	–	20	.355
Stetson	3	–	11	.214	11	–	21	.344
† 2017 ASUN Tournament winner

The 2017 ASUN men's basketball tournament was the conference postseason tournament for the ASUN Conference. The tournament marked the 38th year the league conducted a postseason tournament. The tournament was held February 27, March 2 and 5, 2017 at campus sites as top seeds host each round. Florida Gulf Coast defeated North Florida, 77–61, in the championship game to receive the conference's automatic trip to the NCAA tournament.

== Seeds ==
Teams were seeded by record within the conference, with a tiebreaker system to seed teams with identical conference records.

Seed	School	Conference	Tiebreaker
1	Florida Gulf Coast	12–2	
2	Lipscomb	11–3	
3	North Florida	8–6	
4	USC Upstate	7–7	1–1 vs. KSU, 1–1 vs. FGCU
5	Kennesaw State	7–7	1–1 vs. USC Upstate, 0–2 vs. FGCU
6	Jacksonville	5–9	
7	NJIT	3–11	1–1 vs. Stetson, identical records against all other teams, higher non-conference RPI
8	Stetson	3–11	1–1 vs. NJIT, identical records against all other teams, lower non-conference RPI

== Schedule ==
Time	Matchup	Score	Television	Attendance
Quarterfinals – Monday, February 27
7:00 p.m.	No. 8 Stetson at No. 1 Florida Gulf Coast	57–87	ESPN3	3,744
7:00 p.m.	No. 5 Kennesaw State at No. 4 USC Upstate	80–78	ESPN3	735
7:00 p.m.	No. 6 Jacksonville at No. 3 North Florida	74–77	ESPN3	2,938
8:00 p.m.	No. 7 NJIT at No. 2 Lipscomb	66–97	ESPN3	2,456
Semifinals – Thursday, March 2
7:00 p.m.	No. 5 Kennesaw State at No. 1 Florida Gulf Coast	62–74	ESPN3	4,333
8:00 p.m.	No. 3 North Florida at No. 2 Lipscomb	91–85	ESPN3	3,011
Final – Sunday, March 5
3:00 p.m.	No. 3 North Florida at No. 1 Florida Gulf Coast	61–77	ESPN	4,711
*Game times in ET. #-Rankings denote tournament seeding.

== Bracket ==
Quarterfinals; February 27; ESPN3
1	Florida Gulf Coast	87
8	Stetson	57
4	USC Upstate	78
5	Kennesaw State	80
2	Lipscomb	97
7	NJIT	66
3	North Florida	77
6	Jacksonville	74

Semifinals; March 2 ESPN3
1	Florida Gulf Coast	74
5	Kennesaw State	62
2	Lipscomb	85
3	North Florida	91

Championship; March 5 ESPN
1	Florida Gulf Coast	77
3	North Florida	61

== See also ==
- 2016–17 NCAA Division I men's basketball season
- ASUN men's basketball tournament
- 2017 ASUN women's basketball tournament
