= 2016–17 Lipscomb Bisons men's basketball team =

American college basketball season

2016–17 Lipscomb Bisons men's basketball
- Conference: Atlantic Sun Conference
- Record: 20–13 (11–3 ASUN)
- Head coach: Casey Alexander (4th season)
- Assistant coach: Roger Idstrom; Steve Drabyn; Sean Rutigliano
- Home arena: Allen Arena

2016–17 ASUN men's basketball standings
	Conf.				Overall
Team	W		L	PCT	W		L	PCT
Florida Gulf Coast †	12	–	2	.857	26	–	8	.765
Lipscomb	11	–	3	.786	20	–	13	.606
North Florida	8	–	6	.571	15	–	19	.441
USC Upstate	7	–	7	.500	17	–	16	.515
Kennesaw State	7	–	7	.500	14	–	18	.438
Jacksonville	5	–	9	.357	17	–	16	.515
NJIT	3	–	11	.214	11	–	20	.355
Stetson	3	–	11	.214	11	–	21	.344
† 2017 ASUN Tournament winner

The 2016–17 Lipscomb Bisons men's basketball team represented Lipscomb University during the 2016–17 NCAA Division I men's basketball season. The Bisons, led by fourth-year head coach Casey Alexander, played their home games at Allen Arena in Nashville, Tennessee as members of the Atlantic Sun Conference. They finished the season 20–13, 11–3 in ASUN play to finish in second place. As the No. 2 seed in the ASUN tournament, they defeated NJIT in the quarterfinals to advance to the semifinals where they lost to North Florida. Despite having 20 wins, they did not participate in a postseason tournament.

== Previous season ==
The Bisons finished the 2015–16 season 12–21, 7–7 in A-Sun play to finish in a tie for fifth place. They defeated Jacksonville in the quarterfinals of the A-Sun tournament to advance to the semifinals where they lost to Stetson.

== Roster ==
2016–17 Lipscomb Bisons men's basketball team
Players
Coaches

Pos.	#	Name	Height	Weight	Year	Previous school	Hometown
C	0	Rob Marberry	6 ft 7 in (2.01 m)	215 lb (98 kg)	So	Franklin Road Academy; Western Kentucky	Nashville, TN
G	2	Josh Williams	6 ft 5 in (1.96 m)	210 lb (95 kg)	Sr	Jackson Prep	Jackson, MS
G	3	Michael Buckland	6 ft 5 in (1.96 m)	190 lb (86 kg)	Fr	Wesleyan Christian Academy	High Point, NC
G	4	Cam Miller	6 ft 2 in (1.88 m)	175 lb (79 kg)	Sr	Independence HS	Franklin, TN
G	5	Nathan Moran	5 ft 10 in (1.78 m)	160 lb (73 kg)	Jr	Battle Ground Academy	Franklin, TN
G	11	Asa Duvall	6 ft 2 in (1.88 m)	195 lb (88 kg)	Jr	Hargrave Military Academy	Brentwood, TN
F	12	Matt Rose	6 ft 7 in (2.01 m)	200 lb (91 kg)	So	Lexington Christian Academy; Samford	Lexington, KY
G	20	John Matt Merritt	6 ft 0 in (1.83 m)	155 lb (70 kg)	Fr	Lipscomb Academy	Nashville, TN
G	21	Kenny Cooper	6 ft 0 in (1.83 m)	180 lb (82 kg)	Fr	Franklin Road Academy	Nashville, TN
F	22	Eli Pepper	6 ft 9 in (2.06 m)	205 lb (93 kg)	So	Caldwell County High School	Princeton, KY
G	23	Aaron Korn	6 ft 4 in (1.93 m)	210 lb (95 kg)	Jr	Frankton Junior-Senior HS	Frankton, IN
G	24	Garrison Mathews	6 ft 5 in (1.96 m)	210 lb (95 kg)	So	Franklin HS	Franklin, TN
F	25	Kenny Bunton	6 ft 6 in (1.98 m)	200 lb (91 kg)	Fr	Walker Valley HS	Cleveland, TN
F	32	Brett Wishon	6 ft 11 in (2.11 m)	240 lb (109 kg)	Sr	Fork Union Military Academy	Concord, NC
C	55	George Brammeier	6 ft 10 in (2.08 m)	235 lb (107 kg)	Jr	Bloomingdale HS	Brandon, FL

Head coach

- Casey Alexander (Belmont)

Assistant coach(es)

- Roger Idstrom (Mars Hill College)
- Steve Drabyn (Belmont)
- Sean Rutigliano (Cortland State)

Legend

- (C) Team captain
- (S) Suspended
- (I) Ineligible
- (W) Walk-on
- Injured
- Current redshirt

Roster

== Schedule and results ==
Date time, TV	Rank^{#}	Opponent^{#}	Result	Record	Site (attendance) city, state
Non-conference regular season
11/11/2016*; 12:00 pm, ESPN3		Sewanee	W 96–53	1–0	Allen Arena (1,446); Nashville, TN
11/13/2016*; 3:00 pm		at Morehead State	L 75–89	1–1	Ellis Johnson Arena (1,783); Morehead, KY
11/15/2016*; 6:30 pm, ESPN3		Piedmont	W 99–70	2–1	Allen Arena (1,067); Nashville, TN
11/18/2016*; 7:30 pm		vs. Saint Peter's; Fordham Showcase	L 77–90	2–2	Rose Hill Gymnasium (1,533); Bronx, NY
11/19/2016*; 4:30 pm		vs. Fairleigh Dickinson; Fordham Showcase	L 72–90	2–3	Rose Hill Gymnasium (1,473); Bronx, NY
11/20/2016*; 2:30 pm		at Fordham; Fordham Showcase	L 69–85	2–4	Rose Hill Gymnasium (1,003); Bronx, NY
11/26/2016*; 1:30 pm, ESPN3		at Cincinnati	L 68–91	2–5	Fifth Third Arena (13,176); Cincinnati, OH
11/29/2016*; 7:00 pm		at Belmont	L 62–64	2–6	Curb Event Center (2,863); Nashville, TN
12/01/2016*; 6:30 pm, ESPN3		Tennessee Tech	W 104–85	3–6	Allen Arena (982); Nashville, TN
12/03/2016*; 4:00 pm, ESPN3		Tennessee State	L 71–72	3–7	Allen Arena (1,634); Nashville, TN
12/06/2016*; 6:30 pm, ESPN3		Belmont	L 76–78 ^{OT}	3–8	Allen Arena (2,908); Nashville, TN
12/10/2016*; 4:00 pm, ESPN3		Morehead State	W 98–84	4–8	Allen Arena (1,302); Nashville, TN
12/15/2016*; 6:00 pm, SECN		at Tennessee	L 77–92	4–9	Thompson–Boling Arena (11,893); Knoxville, TN
12/17/2016*; 6:00 pm		at Tennessee Tech	W 81–79	5–9	Eblen Center (961); Cookeville, TN
12/20/2016*; 7:00 pm		at Austin Peay	W 99–85	6–9	Eblen Center (1,467); Cookeville, TN
12/29/2016*; 7:00 pm, SECN		at Missouri	W 81–76	7–9	Mizzou Arena (10,121); Columbia, MO
01/05/2017*; 6:30 pm, ESPN3		Fisk	W 126–43	8–9	Allen Arena (647); Nashville, TN
Atlantic Sun Conference regular season
01/07/2017; 4:00 pm, ESPN3		Kennesaw State	W 82–79	9–9 (1–0)	Allen Arena (1,025); Nashville, TN
01/12/2017; 6:30 pm, ESPN3		Stetson	W 94–68	10–9 (2–0)	Allen Arena (1,114); Nashville, TN
01/14/2017; 4:00 pm, ESPN3		Florida Gulf Coast	L 80–84	10–10 (2–1)	Allen Arena (1,471); Nashville, TN
01/19/2017; 6:00 pm, ESPN3		at Jacksonville	W 112–95	11–10 (3–1)	Swisher Gymnasium (506); Jacksonville, FL
01/21/2017; 6:00 pm, ESPN3		at North Florida	L 84–90	11–11 (3–2)	UNF Arena (2,107); Jacksonville, FL
01/25/2017; 6:30 pm, ESPN3		USC Upstate	W 84–77	12–11 (4–2)	Allen Arena (1,046); Nashville, TN
01/28/2017; 3:00 pm, ESPN3		at NJIT	W 66–62	13–11 (5–2)	Fleisher Center (599); Newark, NJ
01/30/2017; 6:00 pm, ESPN3		at USC Upstate	W 92–80	14–11 (6–2)	G. B. Hodge Center (683); Spartanburg, SC
02/04/2017; 4:00 pm, ESPN3		NJIT	W 87–63	15–11 (7–2)	Allen Arena (1,737); Nashville, TN
02/09/2017; 6:00 pm, ESPN3		at Florida Gulf Coast	W 65–60	16–11 (8–2)	Alico Arena (4,412); Fort Myers, FL
02/11/2017; 3:00 pm, ESPN3		at Stetson	W 97–85	17–11 (9–2)	Edmunds Center (1,151); DeLand, FL
02/16/2017; 6:30 pm, ESPN3		North Florida	L 82–93	17–12 (9–3)	Allen Arena (1,951); Nashville, TN
02/18/2017; 4:00 pm, ESPN3		Jacksonville	W 81–69	18–12 (10–3)	Allen Arena (2,316); Nashville, TN
02/23/2017; 6:00 pm, ESPN3		at Kennesaw State	W 85–74	19–12 (11–3)	KSU Convocation Center (1,355); Kennesaw, GA
Atlantic Sun tournament
02/27/2017; 7:00 pm, ESPN3	(2)	(7) NJIT; Quarterfinals	W 97–66	20–12	Allen Arena (2,456); Nashville, TN
03/02/2017; 7:00 pm, ESPN3	(2)	(3) North Florida; Semifinals	L 85–91	20–13	Allen Arena (3,011); Nashville, TN
*Non-conference game. ^{#}Rankings from AP poll. (#) Tournament seedings in parentheses. All times are in Central Time Source.
