= 2016–17 North Florida Ospreys men's basketball team =

American college basketball season

2016–17 North Florida Ospreys men's basketball
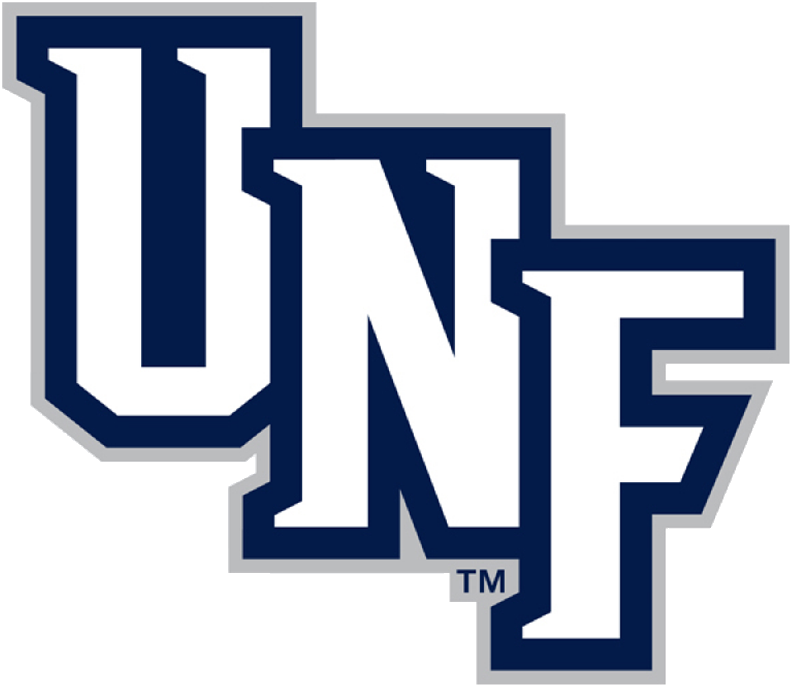
- Conference: Atlantic Sun Conference
- Record: 15–19 (8–6 ASUN)
- Head coach: Matthew Driscoll (8th season)
- Assistant coaches: Bobby Kennen; Byron Taylor; Stephen Perkins
- Home arena: UNF Arena

2016–17 ASUN men's basketball standings
	Conf.				Overall
Team	W		L	PCT	W		L	PCT
Florida Gulf Coast †	12	–	2	.857	26	–	8	.765
Lipscomb	11	–	3	.786	20	–	13	.606
North Florida	8	–	6	.571	15	–	19	.441
USC Upstate	7	–	7	.500	17	–	16	.515
Kennesaw State	7	–	7	.500	14	–	18	.438
Jacksonville	5	–	9	.357	17	–	16	.515
NJIT	3	–	11	.214	11	–	20	.355
Stetson	3	–	11	.214	11	–	21	.344
† 2017 ASUN Tournament winner

The 2016–17 North Florida Ospreys men's basketball team represented the University of North Florida during the 2016–17 NCAA Division I men's basketball season. They were led by eighth–year head coach Matthew Driscoll and played their home games at UNF Arena on the university's campus in Jacksonville, Florida as members of the Atlantic Sun Conference (ASUN). They finished the season 15–19, 8–6 in ASUN play to finish in third place. As the No. 3 seed in the ASUN tournament, they defeated Jacksonville and Lipscomb before losing to Florida Gulf Coast in the championship game.

== Previous season ==
The Ospreys finished the 2015–16 season 22–12, 10–4 in ASUN play to win the regular season championship. In the ASUB tournament they defeated USC Upstate before losing to Florida Gulf Coast in the semifinals. As a regular season conference champion who failed to win their conference tournament, the Ospreys received an automatic bid to the National Invitation Tournament where they lost to Florida in the first round.

== Roster ==
2016–17 North Florida Ospreys men's basketball team
Players
Coaches

Pos.	#	Name	Height	Weight	Year	Hometown
F	1	Karlos Odum	6 ft 7 in (2.01 m)	215 lb (98 kg)	RS So	Lakeland, Florida
F	2	Wajid Aminu	6 ft 7 in (2.01 m)	195 lb (88 kg)	Fr	Stone Mountain, Georgia
G	3	J.T. Escobar	6 ft 2 in (1.88 m)	180 lb (82 kg)	So	Tallahassee, Florida
G	5	C. J. Fisher (redshirt)	6 ft 2 in (1.88 m)	182 lb (83 kg)	Fr	Miami, Florida
G	10	Osborn Blount	5 ft 10 in (1.78 m)	170 lb (77 kg)	RS So	Jacksonville, Florida
G	11	Garrett Sams	6 ft 6 in (1.98 m)	180 lb (82 kg)	Fr	Martin, Tennessee
G	12	Aaron Bodager	6 ft 5 in (1.96 m)	200 lb (91 kg)	RS Sr	Oviedo, Florida
G	14	Dallas Moore	6 ft 1 in (1.85 m)	175 lb (79 kg)	Sr	St. Petersburg, Florida
G	23	Nick Malonga	6 ft 5 in (1.96 m)	192 lb (87 kg)	RS Jr	Bolingbrook, Illinois
G/F	24	Aaron Horne	6 ft 5 in (1.96 m)	180 lb (82 kg)	Jr	Lake Worth, Florida
C	33	Romelo Banks	6 ft 11 in (2.11 m)	252 lb (114 kg)	RS Jr	Kissimmee, Florida
F	35	Chris Davenport	6 ft 8 in (2.03 m)	215 lb (98 kg)	Sr	Atlanta, Georgia
G	50	Benedikt Haid	6 ft 5 in (1.96 m)	190 lb (86 kg)	Fr	Innsbruck, Austria
G	55	Chase Driscoll	5 ft 8 in (1.73 m)	200 lb (91 kg)	Jr	Jacksonville, Florida

Head coach

- Matthew Driscoll (8th year)

Assistant coach(es)

- Bobby Kennen (8th year)
- Bruce Evans (1st year)
- Stephen Perkins (4th year)

Legend

- (C) Team captain
- (S) Suspended
- (I) Ineligible
- (W) Walk-on
- Injured
- Current redshirt

Roster
Last update: November 9, 2016

== Schedule and results ==
Date time, TV	Rank^{#}	Opponent^{#}	Result	Record	High points	High rebounds	High assists	Site (attendance) city, state
Non-conference regular season
November 11*; 9:30 pm, SECN+		at Auburn	L 66–83	0–1	16 – Banks	10 – Banks	3 – Moore	Auburn Arena (8,093); Auburn, AL
November 14*; 7:00 pm, ESPN3		Edward Waters	W 109–73	1–1	37 – Moore	9 – Banks	5 – Tied	UNF Arena (1,787); Jacksonville, FL
November 16*; 7:00 pm, ESPN3		Miami (FL)	L 56–94	1–2	12 – Moore	6 – Aminu	3 – Horne	UNF Arena (3,148); Jacksonville, FL
November 18*; 8:00 pm, SECN+		at LSU	L 70–78	1–3	16 – Davenport	9 – Banks	6 – Davenport	Pete Maravich Assembly Center (6,953); Baton Rouge, LA
November 22*; 7:00 pm, ESPN3		Florida National; Wright State Invitational	W 112–66	2–3	18 – Tied	10 – Aminu	8 – Davenport	UNF Arena (1,384); Jacksonville, FL
November 25*; 4:30 pm		vs. North Dakota; Wright State Invitational	W 76–75	3–3	20 – Moore	8 – Davenport	4 – Davenport	Nutter Center (3,123); Dayton, OH
November 26*; 4:30 pm		at Cal State Bakersfield; Wright State Invitational	L 54–77	3–4	19 – Moore	5 – Banks	3 – Moore	Nutter Center (3,024); Dayton, OH
November 27*; 4:30 pm		vs. Wright State; Wright State Invitational	L 67–75	3–5	29 – Moore	7 – Tied	3 – Tied	Nutter Center (2,975); Dayton, OH
December 1*; 7:00 pm, ESPN3		No. 24 Florida	L 60–91	3–6	31 – Moore	4 – Blount	1 – Tied	UNF Arena (4,113); Jacksonville, FL
December 3*; 4:00 pm, ACCN Extra		at No. 22 Syracuse	L 71–77	3–7	30 – Moore	10 – Tied	5 – Moore	Carrier Dome (22,372); Syracuse, NY
December 10*; 5:30 pm, SECN		at Arkansas	L 76–91	3–8	34 – Moore	5 – Tied	3 – Moore	Bud Walton Arena (13,700); Fayetteville, AR
December 12*; 8:00 pm, YouTube		at Texas–Rio Grande Valley	L 84–98	3–9	24 – Moore	9 – Odum	3 – Tied	UTRGV Fieldhouse (724); Edinburg, TX
December 15*; 7:00 pm, ESPN3		Thomas	W 110–80	4–9	30 – Moore	11 – Tied	11 – Moore	UNF Arena (1,259); Jacksonville, FL
December 18*; 1:00 pm, SNY		at UConn	L 59–80	4–10	18 – Moore	8 – Sams	5 – Moore	Harry A. Gampel Pavilion (7,110); Storrs, CT
December 21*; 7:00 pm		at FIU	L 54–78	4–11	14 – Bodager	4 – Tied	4 – Moore	FIU Arena (635); Miami, FL
December 29*; 7:00 pm, ESPN3		Ball State	L 68–73	4–12	29 – Moore	7 – Tied	4 – Moore	UNF Arena (1,464); Jacksonville, FL
January 2*; 7:00 pm, ESPN3		Palm Beach Atlantic	W 102–67	5–12	23 – Moore	13 – Aminu	6 – Bodager	UNF Arena (1,228); Jacksonville, FL
Atlantic Sun Conference regular season
January 7; 7:00 pm, ESPN3		at Jacksonville; River City Rumble	W 80–64	6–12 (1–0)	24 – Moore	9 – Aminu	4 – Davenport	Swisher Gymnasium (1,360); Jacksonville, FL
January 12; 7:00 pm, ESPN3		at USC Upstate	W 73–65	7–12 (2–0)	19 – Moore	12 – Sams	5 – Moore	G. B. Hodge Center (646); Spartanburg, SC
January 14; 4:00 pm, ESPN3		at NJIT	L 78–84	7–13 (2–1)	30 – Moore	8 – Davenport	3 – Moore	Fleisher Center (812); Newark, NJ
January 19; 7:00 pm, ESPN3		Kennesaw State	W 86–84	8–13 (3–1)	29 – Moore	9 – Aminu	4 – Tied	UNF Arena (1,605); Jacksonville, FL
January 21; 7:00 pm, ESPN3		Lipscomb	W 90–84	9–13 (4–1)	36 – Moore	12 – Banks	4 – Tied	UNF Arena (2,107); Jacksonville, FL
January 25; 7:00 pm, ESPN3		Florida Gulf Coast	L 82–86	9–14 (4–2)	32 – Moore	11 – Aminu	3 – Sams	UNF Arena (2,649); Jacksonville, FL
January 28; 4:00 pm, ESPN3		at Stetson	L 74–88	9–15 (4–3)	26 – Davenport	12 – Davenport	4 – Moore	Edmunds Center (1,131); DeLand, FL
January 30; 7:00 pm, ESPN3		at Florida Gulf Coast	L 59–74	9–16 (4–4)	20 – Davenport	8 – Tied	3 – Davenport	Alico Arena (4,107); Fort Myers, FL
February 4; 7:00 pm, ESPN3		Stetson	W 96–64	10–16 (5–4)	22 – Moore	9 – Sams	11 – Moore	UNF Arena (1,848); Jacksonville, FL
February 9; 7:00 pm, ESPN3		NJIT	W 91–69	11–16 (6–4)	28 – Moore	8 – Aminu	13 – Davenport	UNF Arena (2,011); Jacksonville, FL
February 11; 7:00 pm, ESPN3		USC Upstate	L 71–84	11–17 (6–5)	26 – Moore	8 – Davenport	4 – Tied	UNF Arena (3,181); Jacksonville, FL
February 16; 7:30 pm, ESPN3		at Lipscomb	W 93–82	12–17 (7–5)	39 – Moore	8 – Davenport	6 – Davenport	Allen Arena (1,951); Nashville, TN
February 18; 4:30 pm, ESPN3		at Kennesaw State	L 68–85	12–18 (7–6)	28 – Davenport	9 – Davenport	4 – Moore	KSU Convocation Center (1,362); Kennesaw, GA
February 23; 7:00 pm, ESPN3		Jacksonville; River City Rumble	W 73–69	13–18 (8–6)	25 – Moore	10 – Davenport	6 – Moore	UNF Arena (3,149); Jacksonville, FL
Atlantic Sun tournament
February 27; 7:00 pm, ESPN3	(3)	(6) Jacksonville; Quarterfinals	W 77–74	14–18	37 – Moore	7 – 3 tied	4 – Davenport	UNF Arena (2,938); Jacksonville, FL
March 2; 7:00 pm, ESPN3	(3)	at (2) Lipscomb; Semifinals	W 91–85	15–18	18 – Moore	9 – Banks	7 – Tied	Allen Arena (3,011); Nashville, TN
March 5; 3:00 pm, ESPN	(3)	at (1) Florida Gulf Coast; Championship game	L 61–77	15–19	19 – Moore	12 – Aminu	4 – Moore	Alico Arena (4,711); Fort Myers, FL
*Non-conference game. ^{#}Rankings from AP Poll. (#) Tournament seedings in parentheses. All times are in Eastern Time.
