= 2016–17 Stetson Hatters men's basketball team =

American college basketball season

2016–17 Stetson Hatters men's basketball
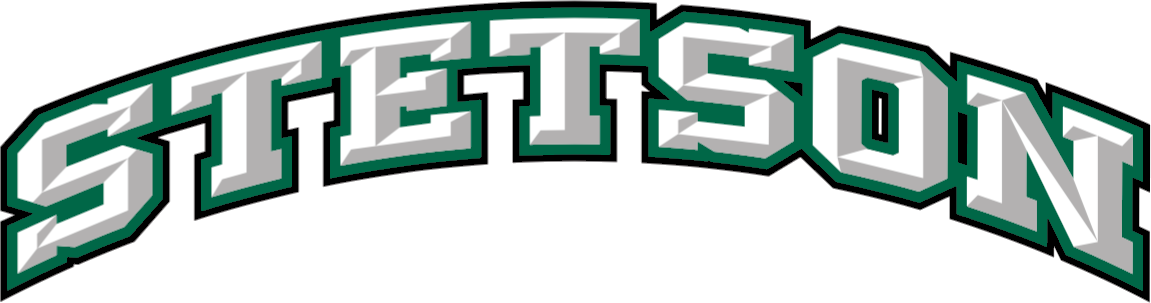
- Conference: Atlantic Sun Conference
- Record: 11–21 (3–11 ASUN)
- Head coach: Corey Williams (4th season)
- Assistant coaches: Bert Capel; Kevin Dux; Nikita Johnson
- Home arena: Edmunds Center

2016–17 ASUN men's basketball standings
	Conf.				Overall
Team	W		L	PCT	W		L	PCT
Florida Gulf Coast †	12	–	2	.857	26	–	8	.765
Lipscomb	11	–	3	.786	20	–	13	.606
North Florida	8	–	6	.571	15	–	19	.441
USC Upstate	7	–	7	.500	17	–	16	.515
Kennesaw State	7	–	7	.500	14	–	18	.438
Jacksonville	5	–	9	.357	17	–	16	.515
NJIT	3	–	11	.214	11	–	20	.355
Stetson	3	–	11	.214	11	–	21	.344
† 2017 ASUN Tournament winner

The 2016–17 Stetson Hatters men's basketball team represented Stetson University during the 2016–17 NCAA Division I men's basketball season. The Hatters, led by fourth-year head coach Corey Williams, played their home games at the Edmunds Center in DeLand, Florida as members of the Atlantic Sun Conference. They finished the season 11–21, 3–11 in ASUN play to finish in a tie for seventh place. They lost in the quarterfinals of the ASUN tournament to Florida Gulf Coast.

== Previous season ==
The Hatters finished the 2015–16 season 12–22, 4–10 A-Sun play to finish in a tie for last place. Due to APR violations, Stetson was ineligible for the NCAA tournament, but was eligible for the Atlantic Sun tournament where they defeated NJIT and Lipscomb before losing in the championship game to Florida Gulf Coast. If Stetson had won, North Florida would have received the conference's automatic NCAA Tournament bid as the regular season champion.

== Roster ==
2016–17 Stetson Hatters men's basketball team
Players
Coaches

Pos.	#	Name	Height	Weight	Year	Previous school	Hometown
G	2	Grant Lozoya	6 ft 2 in (1.88 m)	190 lb (86 kg)	Jr	Lawrenceville School	Westlake Village, CA
G	3	B.J. Glasford	6 ft 4 in (1.93 m)	195 lb (88 kg)	RS Jr	Coral Reef Senior HS	Miami, FL
G	4	Divine Myles	5 ft 11 in (1.8 m)	185 lb (84 kg)	Jr	Mattie T. Blount HS	Mobile, AL
G	5	Angel Rivera	5 ft 8 in (1.73 m)	165 lb (75 kg)	Jr	IMG Academy	Bayamón, Puerto Rico
G	13	Matthew Cioce	6 ft 2 in (1.88 m)	190 lb (86 kg)	Jr	Christ School	Asheville, NC
F/C	14	Larry Dennis	6 ft 9 in (2.06 m)	220 lb (100 kg)	Jr	Sunrise Christian Academy; Hutchinson Community College	Wichita, KS
F	15	Clay Verk	6 ft 8 in (2.03 m)	260 lb (118 kg)	Fr	ThunderRidge High School	Highlands Ranch, CO
G	20	Brady Moses	6 ft 3 in (1.91 m)	175 lb (79 kg)	Jr	Lodi HS; Maranatha Baptist University	Lodi, WI
F/C	21	Will Hollmann	6 ft 8 in (2.03 m)	245 lb (111 kg)	So	DeLand HS	DeLand, FL
F	22	Derick Newton	6 ft 6 in (1.98 m)	220 lb (100 kg)	So	Wilbraham & Monson Academy	Beverly Hills, CA
F/C	23	Kevin Ndahiro	6 ft 9 in (2.06 m)	225 lb (102 kg)	So	Thomas Nelson High School	Ottawa, Ontario, Canada
G	33	Luke Doyle	6 ft 5 in (1.96 m)	205 lb (93 kg)	Jr	Paul J. Hagerty HS; Nicholls State	Oviedo, FL
G/F	35	Leo Goodman	6 ft 5 in (1.96 m)	210 lb (95 kg)	So	Theodore Roosevelt HS	Saginaw, MI
F	41	Brian Pegg	6 ft 7 in (2.01 m)	235 lb (107 kg)	GS	Faith Baptist School	Clearwater, FL

Head coach

- Corey Williams (Oklahoma State)

Assistant coach(es)

- Bert Capel (Evangel University)
- Kevin Dux (Florida State)
- Nikita Johnson (West Georgia)

Legend

- (C) Team captain
- (S) Suspended
- (I) Ineligible
- (W) Walk-on
- Injured
- Current redshirt

Roster

== Schedule and results ==
Date time, TV	Rank^{#}	Opponent^{#}	Result	Record	Site (attendance) city, state
Regular season
11/11/2016*; 8:00 pm		Webber International	W 78–62	1–0	Edmunds Center (820); DeLand, FL
11/14/2016*; 7:00 pm, ESPN3		FIU	W 82–67	2–0	Edmunds Center (682); DeLand, FL
11/18/2016*; 7:00 pm		The Citadel	L 112–116	2–1	Edmunds Center (822); DeLand, FL
11/20/2016*; 1:00 pm		at East Carolina; Savannah Invitational	L 50–73	2–2	Williams Arena at Minges Coliseum (3,387); Greeeville, NC
11/22/2016*; 9:00 pm		at Air Force; Savannah Invitational	L 72–85	2–3	Clune Arena (1,523); Colorado Springs, CO
11/25/2016*; 12:00 pm		vs. Radford; Savannah Invitational	L 66–80 ^{OT}	2–4	Savannah Civic Center (491); Savannah, GA
11/26/2016*; 12:00 pm		vs. Florida A&M; Savannah Invitational	W 98–90	3–4	Savannah Civic Center; Savannah, GA
11/30/2016*; 7:00 pm		at UCF	L 45–81	3–5	CFE Arena (5,284); Orlando, FL
12/03/2016*; 1:00 pm		Florida College	W 101–69	4–5	Edmunds Center (565); DeLand, FL
12/05/2016*; 8:00 pm, ESPNU		at Iowa	L 68–95	4–6	Carver–Hawkeye Arena (9,839); Iowa City, IA
12/07/2016*; 9:00 pm		at SIU Edwardsville	W 80–72	5–6	Vadalabene Center (1,007); Edwardsville, IL
12/10/2016*; 7:00 pm		South Alabama	W 87–78	6–6	Edmunds Center (866); DeLand, FL
12/18/2016*; 1:00 pm		IPFW	L 74–93	6–7	Edmunds Center (793); DeLand, FL
12/22/2016*; 2:00 pm		at Campbell	L 72–81	6–8	Gore Arena (1,034); Buies Creek, NC
12/29/2016*; 7:00 p.m.		at Alabama	L 60–83	6–9	Coleman Coliseum (11,128); Tuscaloosa, AL
01/02/2017*; 7:00 pm		Ave Maria	W 95–72	7–9	Edmunds Center (652); DeLand, FL
01/07/2017; 4:00 pm, ESPN3		Florida Gulf Coast	L 88–89	7–10 (0–1)	Edmunds Center (1,207); DeLand, FL
01/12/2017; 7:30 pm, ESPN3		at Lipscomb	L 68–94	7–11 (0–2)	Allen Arena (1,114); Nashville, TN
01/14/2017; 4:30 pm, ESPN3		at Kennesaw State	L 65–84	7–12 (0–3)	KSU Convocation Center (751); Kennesaw, GA
01/19/2017; 7:00 pm, ESPN3		NJIT	W 82–76	8–12 (1–3)	Edmunds Center (985); DeLand, FL
01/21/2017; 4:00 pm, ESPN3		USC Upstate	L 86–97	8–13 (1–4)	Edmunds Center (960); DeLand, FL
01/25/2017; 7:00 pm, ESPN3		at Jacksonville	L 92–103	8–14 (1–5)	Swisher Gymnasium (859); Jacksonville, FL
01/28/2017; 4:00 pm, ESPN3		North Florida	W 88–74	9–14 (2–5)	Edmunds Center (1,131); DeLand, FL
01/30/2017; 7:00 pm, ESPN3		Jacksonville	L 86–89	9–15 (2–6)	Edmunds Center (799); DeLand, FL
02/01/2017*; 7:00 pm		at Bethune–Cookman	W 76–67	10–15	Moore Gymnasium (612); Daytona Beach, FL
02/04/2017; 7:00 pm, ESPN3		at North Florida	L 64–96	10–16 (2–7)	UNF Arena (1,848); Jacksonville, FL
02/09/2017; 7:00 pm, ESPN3		Kennesaw State	L 85–92	10–17 (2–8)	Edmunds Center (694); DeLand, FL
02/11/2017; 4:00 pm, ESPN3		Lipscomb	L 85–97	10–18 (2–9)	Edmunds Center (1,151); DeLand, FL
02/16/2017; 7:00 pm, ESPN3		at USC Upstate	W 83–72	11–18 (3–9)	Hodge Center (517); Spartanburg, SC
02/18/2017; 4:00 pm, ESPN3		at NJIT	L 56–60	11–19 (3–10)	Fleisher Center (755); Newark, NJ
02/23/2017; 7:00 pm, ESPN3		at Florida Gulf Coast	L 70–80	11–20 (3–11)	Alico Arena (4,700); Fort Myers, FL
Atlantic Sun tournament
02/27/2017; 7:00 pm, ESPN3	(8)	at (1) Florida Gulf Coast; Quarterfinals	L 57–87	11–21	Alico Arena (4,633); Fort Myers, FL
*Non-conference game. ^{#}Rankings from AP Poll. (#) Tournament seedings in parentheses. All times are in Eastern Time.
