= Joe Dooley (basketball) =

American basketball coach (born 1965)

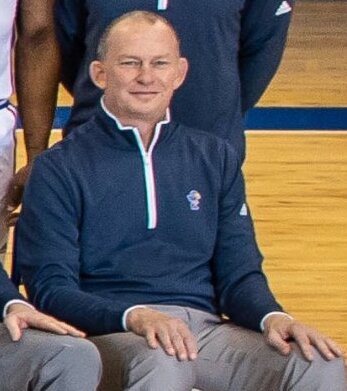
- Dooley in 2022

Current position
- Title: Assistant coach
- Team: Kansas
- Conference: Big 12

Biographical details
- Born: January 29, 1965 (age 61); West Orange, New Jersey, U.S.

Playing career
- 1984–1988: George Washington

Coaching career (HC unless noted)
- 1988–1991: South Carolina (assistant)
- 1991–1995: East Carolina (assistant)
- 1995–1999: East Carolina
- 1999–2002: New Mexico (assistant)
- 2002–2003: Wyoming (assistant)
- 2003–2013: Kansas (assistant)
- 2013–2018: Florida Gulf Coast
- 2018–2022: East Carolina
- 2024–present: Kansas (assistant)

Head coaching record
- Overall: 215–177 (.548)
- Tournaments: 1–2 (NCAA Division I); 0–2 (NIT); 0–1 (CIT)

Accomplishments and honors

Championships
- 3 A-Sun regular season (2014, 2017, 2018); 2 A-Sun tournament (2016, 2017)

Awards
- 2× ASUN Coach of the Year (2017, 2018)

Joseph Gerard Dooley III (born January 29, 1965) is the former head men's basketball coach of the East Carolina University Pirates, having previously served as head coach from 1995 to 1999 and 2018-2022. Dooley was an assistant on the Kansas Jayhawks 2007–08 NCAA national championship team and previously served as head coach at Florida Gulf Coast University.

Dooley is a 1988 graduate of George Washington University in Washington, D.C., where he completed his bachelor's degree in speech communications. A four-year letter winner in basketball at George Washington, he started his last two seasons and was elected a team captain as a senior. A native of West Orange, New Jersey, Dooley was a prep player at St. Benedict's Preparatory School in Newark, New Jersey, where he scored 1,140 career points. He is married to Tanya and has a son named Max.

== College coaching history ==
=== Early coaching jobs ===
In 1988, Dooley joined George Felton's staff at the University of South Carolina. While on staff there, the Gamecocks earned a berth in the 1989 NCAA Division I men's basketball tournament and the 1991 National Invitation Tournament. In 1991, he followed fellow South Carolina assistant Eddie Payne to East Carolina. His role involved coaching the backcourt, scheduling, and recruiting. He helped the team earn a championship in the 1993 CAA men's basketball tournament and a berth in the NCAA tournament; the program's first in 21 years.

=== East Carolina ===
After the 1994–1995 season, Eddie Payne departed the Pirate program for Oregon State. Dooley was promoted to head coach of East Carolina. At age 29, he was the youngest head coach in the nation. In his first three years, his teams posted 45 wins (the most of any head coach of the program in the same time period). Despite still being the only head coach for the Pirates' program to have an overall winning record at 57–52, he was fired from the job after the 1999 season.

=== As an assistant ===
After leaving ECU, Dooley spent stints as an assistant at New Mexico, Wyoming, and Kansas. While on Bill Self's staff at Kansas Dooley was known as a great recruiter, bringing in players such as Cole Aldrich, Mario Chalmers, Tyrel Reed, Russell Robinson, Tyshawn Taylor, and Sasha Kaun. After 10 years on the Jayhawks' staff, Dooley accepted the head coaching job at Florida Gulf Coast.

=== Florida Gulf Coast ===
Dooley won twenty or more games in all five years of his tenure with the Eagles. In 2017, he became FGCU's first coach to be named Atlantic Sun coach of the year, he earned his second honor in 2018. He earned two NCAA tournaments and two NITs at the school.

=== Return to East Carolina ===
Following the 2017–2018 season, Dooley was hired as head coach at East Carolina, where he had previously been the head coach.

On March 11, 2022, Dooley was fired a second time by East Carolina, compiling a 101-119 record in his two-stints.

== Head coaching record ==
Record table
Season	Team	Overall	Conference	Standing	Postseason
East Carolina Pirates (Colonial Athletic Association) (1995–1999)
1995–96	East Carolina	17–11	9–9	T–4th	
1996–97	East Carolina	17–10	9–7	T–3rd	
1997–98	East Carolina	10–17	5–11	T–7th	
1998–99	East Carolina	13–14	7–9	7th	
Florida Gulf Coast Eagles (ASUN Conference) (2013–2018)
2013–14	Florida Gulf Coast	22–13	14–4	T–1st	NIT First Round
2014–15	Florida Gulf Coast	22–11	11–3	2nd	CIT First Round
2015–16	Florida Gulf Coast	21–14	8–6	T–2nd	NCAA Division I Round of 64
2016–17	Florida Gulf Coast	26–8	12–2	1st	NCAA Division I Round of 64
2017–18	Florida Gulf Coast	23–12	12–2	1st	NIT First Round
Florida Gulf Coast:		114–58 (.663)	57–17 (.770)		
East Carolina Pirates (American Athletic Conference) (2018–2022)
2018–19	East Carolina	10–21	3–15	11th	
2019–20	East Carolina	11–20	5–13	11th	
2020–21	East Carolina	8–11	2–8	11th	
2021–22	East Carolina	15–15	6–11	9th	
East Carolina:		101–119 (.459)	46–83 (.357)		
Total:		215–177 (.548)			
National champion Postseason invitational champion Conference regular season champion Conference regular season and conference tournament champion Division regular season champion Division regular season and conference tournament champion Conference tournament champion
