= Brandon Goodwin (basketball) =

American basketball player (born 1995)

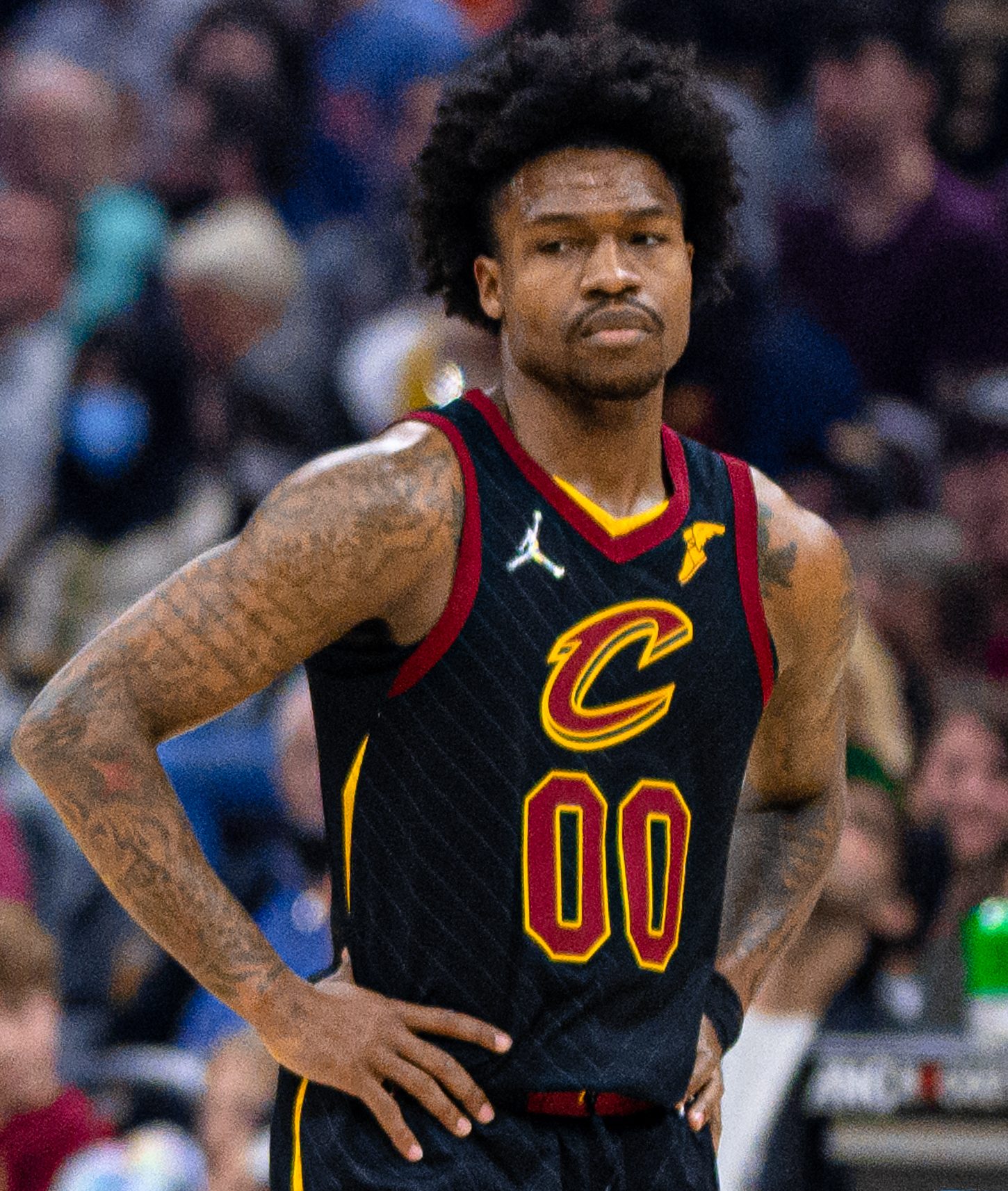
- Goodwin with the Cleveland Cavaliers in 2022

No. 0 – Shanghai Sharks
- Position: Point guard
- League: CBA

Personal information
- Born: October 2, 1995 (age 31) Norcross, Georgia, U.S.
- Listed height: 6 ft 0 in (1.83 m)
- Listed weight: 180 lb (82 kg)

Career information
- High school: Norcross (Norcross, Georgia)
- College: UCF (2013–2015); Florida Gulf Coast (2016–2018)
- NBA draft: 2018: undrafted
- Playing career: 2018–present

Career history
- 2018: Memphis Hustle
- 2018–2019: Denver Nuggets
- 2019: →Iowa Wolves
- 2019–2021: Atlanta Hawks
- 2019–2020: →College Park Skyhawks
- 2021: Westchester Knicks
- 2021–2022: Cleveland Cavaliers
- 2022: →Cleveland Charge
- 2023–2024: Westchester Knicks
- 2024: Cangrejeros de Santurce
- 2024: Gigantes de Carolina
- 2024–2025: Shanxi Loongs
- 2025–present: Shanghai Sharks

Career highlights
- CBA champion (2026); CBA Finals MVP (2026); CBA assists leaders (2026); CBA Club Cup champion (2026); NBA G League Showcase Cup champion (2023); NBA G League Showcase Cup MVP (2023); Atlantic Sun Player of the Year (2018); 2× First-team All-Atlantic Sun (2017, 2018); Atlantic Sun Newcomer of the Year (2017); Atlantic Sun tournament MVP (2017)
- Stats at NBA.com
- Stats at Basketball Reference

Brandon Datrelle Goodwin (born October 2, 1995) is an American-born naturalized Qatari professional basketball player for the Shanghai Sharks of the Chinese Basketball Association (CBA). He played college basketball for the UCF Knights and the Florida Gulf Coast Eagles, being named the 2018 ASUN Conference Player of the Year with the latter.

== College career ==
Goodwin, a 6'0" point guard, committed to UCF from Norcross High School. He played for the Knights in the 2013–14 and 2014–15 seasons. He left UCF after being caught taking (though later returning) a bike on campus the summer after his freshman year.

Goodwin landed at Florida Gulf Coast (FGCU) after leaving UCF. After sitting out a season as a transfer, he averaged 18.5 points, 4.5 rebounds and 4.1 assists per game and was named ASUN Conference Newcomer of the Year. He then led the Eagles to an NCAA Tournament berth after earning Atlantic Sun tournament MVP honors.

Following his junior season, Goodwin declared for the 2017 NBA draft without signing with an agent, ultimately deciding to return to FGCU for his senior year.

In his senior year, Goodwin led the Eagles to a regular season Atlantic Sun championship and was named first-team All-Atlantic Sun and the Atlantic Sun Player of the Year. He averaged 18.6 points, 5.5 rebounds, 4.8 assists and 1.4 steals per game as a senior.

== Professional career ==
=== Memphis Hustle (2018) ===
After going undrafted in the 2018 NBA draft, Goodwin signed with the Memphis Grizzlies for the 2018 NBA Summer League. On September 4, he joined the Grizzlies for training camp. He was waived on October 13, as one of the final roster cuts before opening night. Goodwin was subsequently added to the roster of the Grizzlies' NBA G League affiliate, the Memphis Hustle. In nine appearances with the Hustle, Goodwin averaged 23.4 points, 5.3 rebounds and 4 assists per game.

=== Denver Nuggets (2018–2019) ===
On November 29, 2018, Goodwin was signed by the Denver Nuggets. The Nuggets were granted an injury hardship relief exception from the NBA, allowing them to add Goodwin to their otherwise full roster. He was waived on December 10, without appearing in any games.

On December 13, 2018, the Memphis Hustle announced that Goodwin had returned to their team. Three days later the Nuggets re-signed Goodwin to a two-way contract.

=== Atlanta Hawks (2019–2021) ===
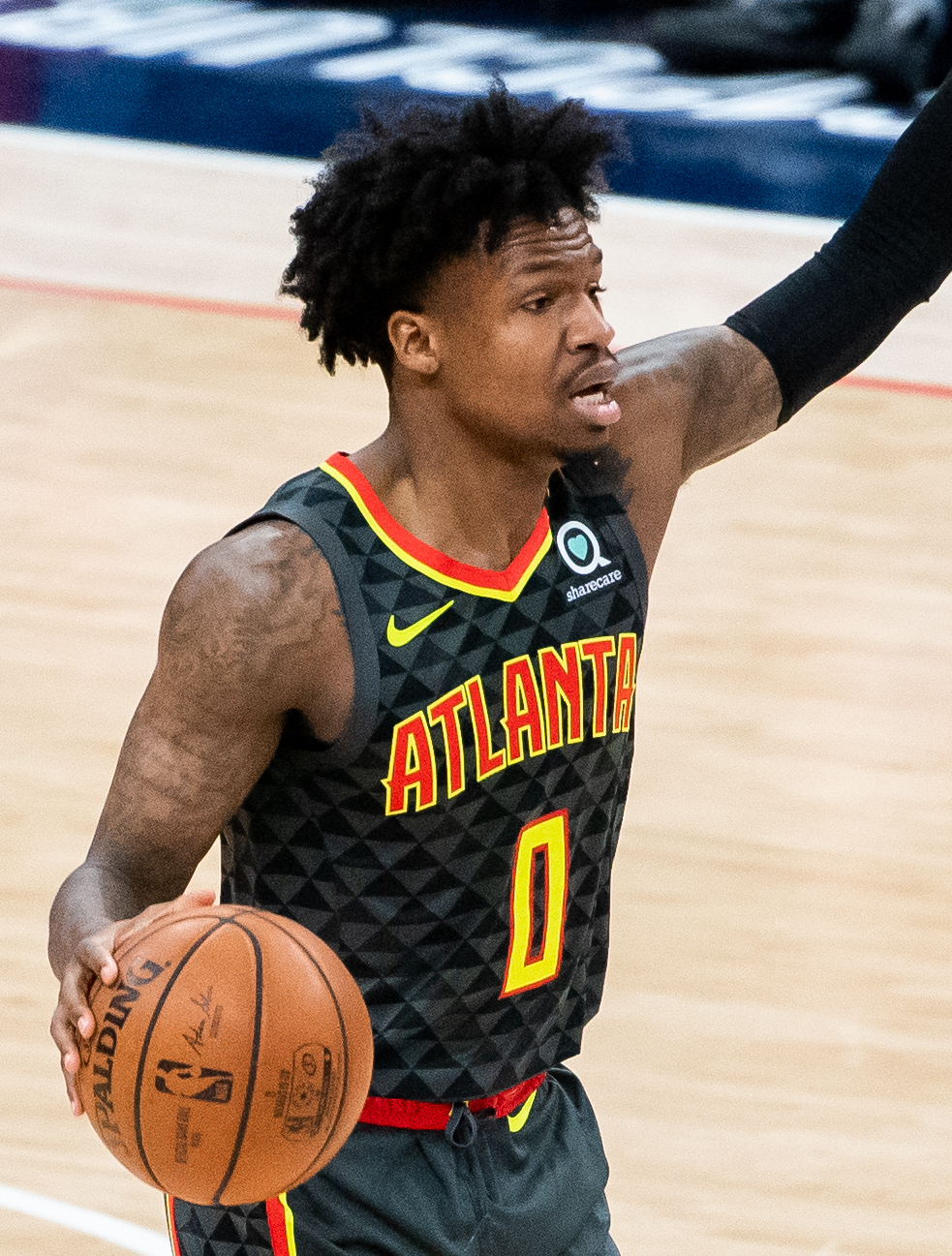
Goodwin with the Hawks in 2020

On August 6, 2019, Goodwin signed a two-way contract with the Atlanta Hawks. On February 12, 2020, the Atlanta Hawks announced that they had re-signed Goodwin to a multi-year contract. Goodwin missed the 2021 NBA playoffs due to a respiratory condition. On October 3, 2021, with his season having ended early, Goodwin reported severe fatigue coupled with extreme back pain, and a formal diagnosis of blood clots followed. Goodwin initially blamed a COVID vaccination for his condition but later indicated he wasn't sure.

=== Westchester Knicks (2021) ===
On October 14, Goodwin was signed by the New York Knicks, who waived him the next day. In October 2021, he joined the Westchester Knicks as an affiliate player. He averaged 15.3 points, 5.1 rebounds, 7.0 assists and 1.9 steals per game.

=== Cleveland Cavaliers (2021–2022) ===
On December 31, 2021, Goodwin signed a 10-day contract with the Cleveland Cavaliers via the hardship exemption. On January 9, 2022, his deal was converted to a two-way contract.

=== Return to Westchester (2023–2024) ===
On October 19, 2023, Goodwin signed with the New York Knicks, but was waived two days later. On November 9, 2023, Goodwin was named to the opening night roster for the Westchester Knicks. On March 27, 2024, he reached a buyout with Westchester.

=== Cangrejeros de Santurce (2024) ===
On March 5, 2024, Goodwin signed with the Cangrejeros de Santurce of the Baloncesto Superior Nacional.

=== Gigantes de Carolina (2024) ===
On April 19, 2024, Goodwin was acquired by the Gigantes de Carolina of the Baloncesto Superior Nacional after being let go by Santurce.

=== Shanxi Loongs (2024–2025) ===
In August 2024, Goodwin joined the Shanxi Loongs of the Chinese Basketball Association (CBA). During the 2024–25 season, he averaged 24.9 points, 5.9 rebounds and 7.7 assists per game in 50 appearances. Goodwin helped Shanxi reach the CBA semifinals before the team was eliminated from the playoffs.

=== Shanghai Sharks (2025–present) ===
Goodwin joined the Shanghai Sharks for the 2025–26 season. He helped Shanghai win the 2026 CBA championship, the club's first league title in 24 years. Goodwin was named Finals MVP after averaging 29.2 points and 9.0 assists per game including a game-winning buzzer-beater in game two during the five-game finals series against the Zhejiang Guangsha Lions. He also helped the Sharks win the CBA Club Cup during the 2025–26 season.

In October 2026, Shanghai announced that Goodwin would return for the 2026–27 season.

== NBA career statistics ==
Legend
GP	Games played	GS	Games started	MPG	Minutes per game
FG%	Field goal percentage	3P%	3-point field goal percentage	FT%	Free throw percentage
RPG	Rebounds per game	APG	Assists per game	SPG	Steals per game
BPG	Blocks per game	PPG	Points per game	**Bold**	Career high

=== Regular season ===
Year	Team	GP	GS	MPG	FG%	3P%	FT%	RPG	APG	SPG	BPG	PPG
2018–19	Denver	16	0	3.6	.261	.333	.818	.2	.9	.0	.0	1.4
2019–20	Atlanta	34	1	12.6	.400	.299	**.933**	**2.1**	1.5	.4	**.1**	**6.1**
2020–21	Atlanta	**47**	**5**	13.2	.377	.311	.651	1.5	2.0	.4	.0	4.9
2021–22	Cleveland	36	**5**	**13.9**	**.416**	**.345**	.632	1.9	**2.5**	**.7**	.0	4.8
Career		133	11	12.1	.390	.315	.730	1.6	1.9	.4	.0	4.7

=== College ===
Year	Team	GP	GS	MPG	FG%	3P%	FT%	RPG	APG	SPG	BPG	PPG
2013–14	UCF	28	9	14.7	.397	.222	.592	1.9	1.8	.5	.0	3.0
2014–15	UCF	30	30	**33.8**	.437	.262	.607	3.9	4.2	1.2	**.1**	10.2
2015–16	Florida Gulf Coast	(redshirt) Did not play (transfer)										
2016–17	Florida Gulf Coast	**34**	**34**	31.6	**.512**	**.353**	**.791**	4.5	4.1	1.2	**.1**	18.5
2017–18	Florida Gulf Coast	**34**	33	33.4	.470	.275	.750	**5.5**	**4.8**	**1.4**	**.1**	**18.6**
Career		126	106	28.8	.474	.301	.716	4.1	3.8	1.1	.1	13.1
