= Dallas Moore =

American basketball player (born 1994)

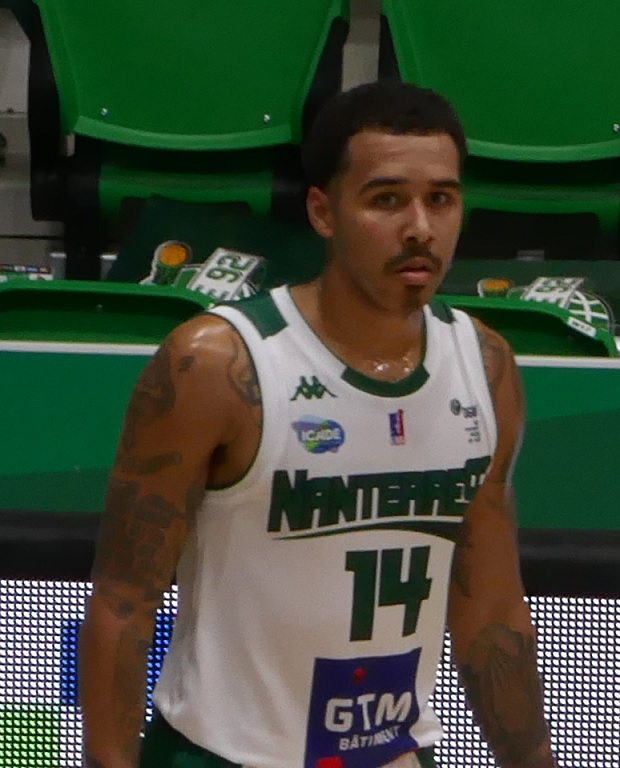

No. 14 – Safiport Erokspor
- Position: Point guard
- League: BSL

Personal information
- Born: October 27, 1994 (age 32) Largo, Florida, U.S.
- Listed height: 6 ft 1 in (1.85 m)
- Listed weight: 180 lb (82 kg)

Career information
- High school: Boca Ciega (Gulfport, Florida)
- College: North Florida (2013–2017)
- NBA draft: 2017: undrafted
- Playing career: 2017–present

Career history
- 2017–2018: Victoria Libertas Pesaro
- 2018: Hapoel Tel Aviv
- 2018–2019: Auxilium Torino
- 2019–2020: Nanterre 92
- 2020–2021: Guangzhou Loong Lions
- 2021–2022: Partizan
- 2022–2023: CSKA Moscow
- 2023–2024: Guangzhou Loong Lions
- 2024–2025: Shandong Hi-Speed Kirin
- 2025–2026: Jilin Northeast Tigers
- 2026–present: Esenler Erokspor

Career highlights
- 2× AP Honorable Mention All-American (2016, 2017); 2× Atlantic Sun Player of the Year (2016, 2017); 3× First-team All-Atlantic Sun (2015–2017); Atlantic Sun Freshman of the Year (2014)

Dallas Joseph Moore (born October 27, 1994) is an American-born naturalized Albanian professional basketball player for Esenler Erokspor of the Basketbol Süper Ligi (BSL). He played college basketball for University of North Florida (UNF), where he was named the ASUN Conference Player of the Year after both his junior and senior seasons in 2016 and 2017.

== College career ==
Moore, a 6'1 point guard from St. Petersburg, Florida, immediately entered the starting lineup upon arriving at UNF. As a freshman during the 2013–14 season, he averaged 12.5 points and 2.6 assists per game – both team highs – and was named the ASUN Conference Freshman of the Year. As a sophomore, Moore led the team to its first NCAA tournament berth and was named first-team All-Atlantic Sun. In his junior season, Moore averaged 19.8 points and 6.0 assists per game and was named the Atlantic Sun Player of the Year.

Following his junior year, Moore declared his eligibility for the 2016 NBA draft, before ultimately choosing to return to the Ospreys for his senior season.

In his senior year at North Florida, he averaged 23.8 points, 3.1 rebounds, 3.9 assists and 1.1 steals per game. Moore finished his college career with 2,437 points, which is the most in UNF history and 2nd most in ASUN Conference history. On February 26, 2017, Moore was named Atlantic Sun Player of the Year, becoming the third student-athlete in ASUN history to secure back-to-back ASUN Player of the Year recognition.

== Professional career ==
=== Pesaro (2017–2018) ===
After going undrafted in the 2017 NBA draft, Moore joined the Denver Nuggets for the 2017 NBA Summer League, where he averaged 9.3 points and 1.6 rebounds per game.

On July 15, 2017, Moore started his professional career with the Italian team Consultinvest Pesaro, signing a one-year deal. On October 8, 2017, Moore recorded a season-high 29 points, shooting 9-of-13 from the field, along with four rebounds and three assists in a 102–95 win over Reggio Emilia. He was subsequently named LBA Round 2 MVP.

In 22 games played for Pesaro, Moore finished the season as the LBA second-leading scorer with 18.7 points, to go with 3.7 rebounds, 2.1 assists and 1.2 steals per game.

=== Hapoel Tel Aviv (2018) ===
On August 16, 2018, Moore signed with the Israeli team Hapoel Tel Aviv for the 2018–19 season. On October 6, 2018, Moore recorded 24 points in his first Israeli League game, he shot 9-of-13 from the field, along with three rebounds and four assists in a 100–81 win over Hapoel Eilat. On November 10, 2018, Moore parted ways with Hapoel after appearing in six games.

=== Auxilium Torino (2018–2019) ===
On November 20, 2018, Moore signed a deal with Italian team Auxilium Torino. On January 13, 2019, Moore recorded a career-high 30 points, shooting 12-19 from the field, along with six rebounds in a 102–98 loss to Pesaro. In 23 LBA games played for Torino, he averaged 15.9 points, 2.3 rebounds and 3.1 assists per game, while shooting 40 percent from three-point range.

=== Nanterre 92 (2019–2020) ===
On July 23, 2019, Moore signed a one-year deal with Nanterre 92 of the French LNB Pro A. He averaged 14.2 points and 2.4 assists per game. Moore signed a one-year extension with the team on June 16, 2020.

=== Guangzhou Loong Lions (2020–2021) ===
On October 17, 2020, Moore signed with Guangzhou Loong Lions.

=== KK Partizan (2021–2022) ===
On July 23, Moore signed with KK Partizan of the ABA League and EuroCup.

=== Esenler Erokspor (2026–present) ===
On July 7, 2026, he signed with Esenler Erokspor of the Basketbol Süper Ligi (BSL).

== Albania national team ==
On May 24, 2018, Moore received an Albanian passport, making him eligible for the Albania national basketball team.

On July 1, 2018, Moore made his first appearance for the Albanian team in the EuroBasket 2021 qualification game against Denmark.
