= Kings–Lakers rivalry =

National Basketball Association rivalry

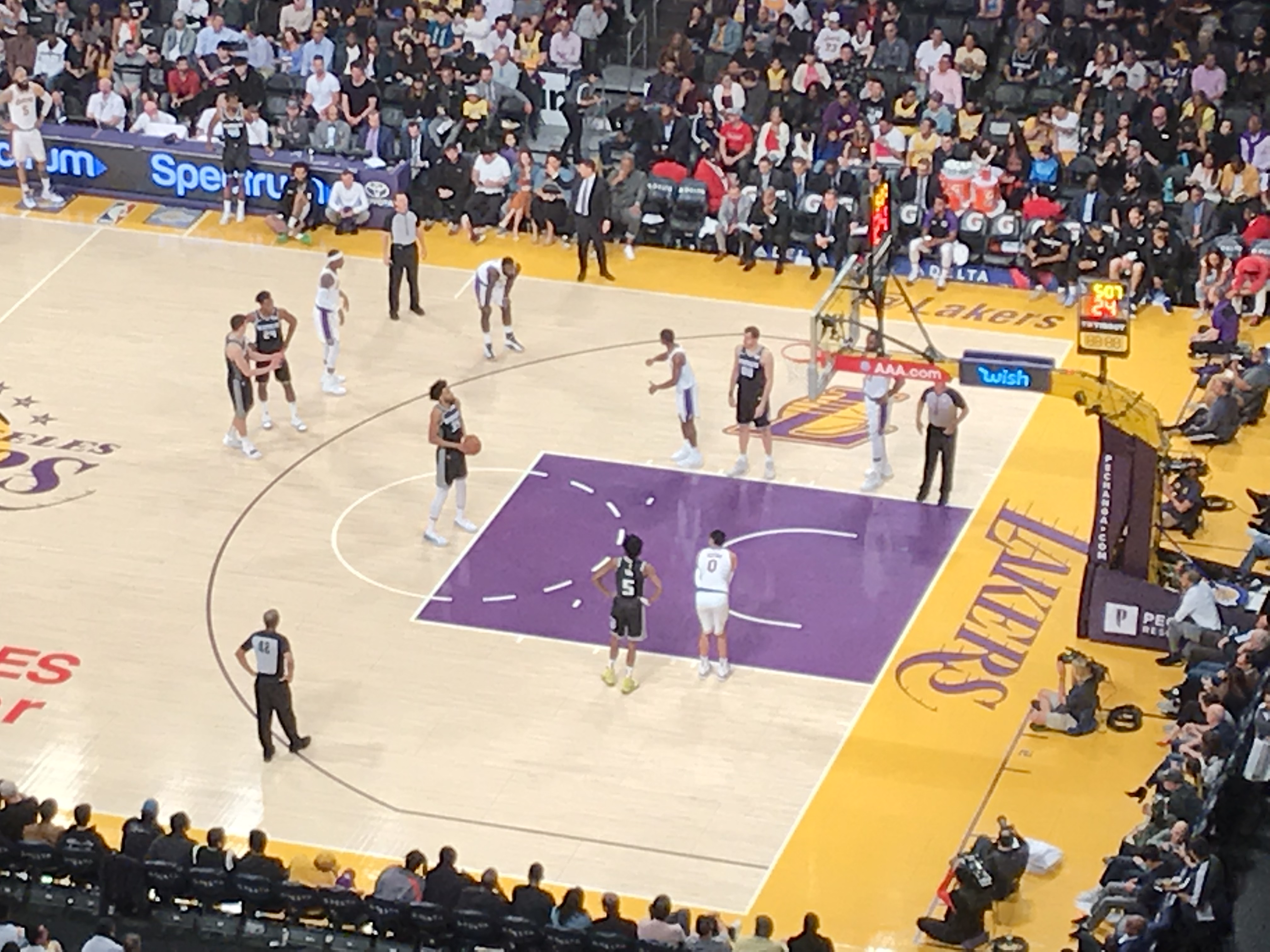
- Kings' Marvin Bagley III attempting a free throw against the Lakers at the Staples Center during a regular season game in March 2019.

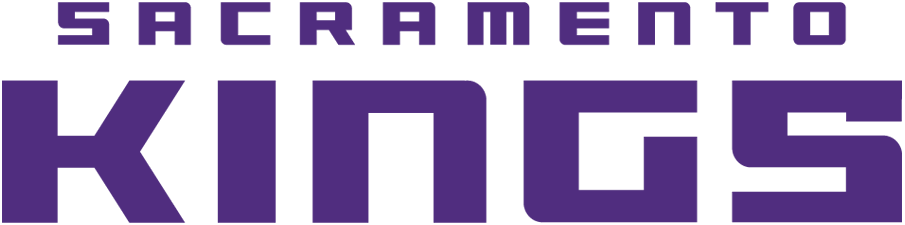
- Sacramento Kings Los Angeles Lakers
- First meeting: November 14, 1948; Royals 92, Lakers 75
- Latest meeting: November 4, 2026; Lakers 116, Kings 103
- Next meeting: November 4, 2026

Statistics
- Total meetings: 494
- All-time series: 314–180 (LAL)
- Regular season series: 288–169 (LAL)
- Postseason results: 26–11 (LAL)
- Longest win streak: LAL W24 (1983–1988)
- Current win streak: LAL W1

Postseason history
- 1949 Western Division Finals: Lakers won, 2–0; 1951 Western Division Finals: Royals won, 3–1; 1952 Western Division Finals: Lakers won, 3–1; 1954 Western Division Finals: Lakers won, 2–1; 1955 Western Division Semifinals: Lakers won, 2–1; 1984 Western Conference First Round: Lakers won, 3–0; 2000 Western Conference First Round: Lakers won, 3–2; 2001 Western Conference Semifinals: Lakers won, 4–0; 2002 Western Conference Finals: Lakers won, 4–3

Locations of the Sacramento Kings and Los Angeles Lakers.

The Kings–Lakers rivalry is a National Basketball Association (NBA) rivalry between the Sacramento Kings and the Los Angeles Lakers. Historically, the rivalry has been seen as a very intense one, with constant playoff series match-ups occurring in the early days in the NBA (including the 1947–48 NBL season and 1948–49 BAA season in the two predecessor leagues they both played in before they merged to become the NBA) and some bitterly contested playoff series match-ups occurring within the early 2000s. They have shared a home state of California since the Kings relocated to Sacramento in 1985.

== Background ==
The Sacramento Kings would be born as an independent franchise in 1923 by first operating as the Rochester Seagrams. However, after primarily operating as an independent franchise for most of their existence up until the World War II years, with Prohibition's long-term effects resulting in the team's final seasons as an independent franchise leading to them first play as the Rochester Eber Seagrams and then as the Rochester Pros, they would finally enter the National Basketball League in 1945 after World War II ended alongside the Youngstown Bears and the Indianapolis Kautskys as the Rochester Royals after the Rochester franchise previously declined entry back when that league originally was known as the Midwest Basketball Conference in the mid-1930s. Rochester's first season would see immediate success, as while they wouldn't get the best record in the NBL that season, they would win the NBL championship by first winning 3–1 over the Fort Wayne Zollner Pistons in the Eastern Division Playoff and then sweeping the Sheboygan Red Skins 3–0 in the championship round. By contrast, the Lakers would see anything but immediate success upon their entry into the NBL as the Detroit Gems the following season, as they would see themselves with the worst record that season through a 4–40 record while the Royals entered the championship round yet again (though failed to repeat that season). Following that massive failure of a season for the Gems, the franchise would move operations to Minneapolis to become the Minneapolis Lakers. From there, the Royals and Lakers would become the two best teams in their respective divisions in the 1947–48 NBL season, with them eventually seeing each other in the NBL championship that season, with the Lakers winning their first ever playoff series match-up 3–1 due to their newest center pick-up, George Mikan from the former NBL champion Chicago American Gears.

Both teams joined the BAA in 1948 (alongside the since-rebranded Fort Wayne Pistons (now Detroit Pistons) and Indianapolis Jets, the latter of which would fold operations a year later), which would become the NBA the following year due to the merger of the younger BAA and the older NBL. During their only season of play within the BAA, the Lakers and Royals would meet up once again in a playoff setting, this time being held in the BAA's Western Division Finals, which ended with Minneapolis sweeping Rochester 2–0 and later winning the final BAA championship ever held before its merger into the modern-day NBA. The Lakers won five of these series and went on to win five NBA Championships in Minneapolis, while the Royals won the 1951 series and went on to win the 1951 NBA Finals, their sole NBA Championship.

The Royals would then go through various periods of futility and success, with a relocation to Cincinnati in 1957, a period of playoff appearances between 1962 and 1967 led by MVP point guard Oscar Robertson, another location to Kansas City, Missouri in 1972 (with a part-time residency in Omaha, Nebraska until 1975) with minimal playoff success (while renaming to the Kings to avoid confusion with the Kansas City Royals), and then finally relocating to Sacramento, California in 1985, where they remain today. Meanwhile, the Lakers would relocate to their present-day home of Los Angeles in 1960, winning six more championships between 1972 and 1988, largely with the Showtime team led by MVPs Magic Johnson, Kareem Abdul-Jabbar, coach Pat Riley, owner Jerry Buss, and general manager Jerry West. The Kings and Lakers had one playoff series against each other during this period in 1984 (while the Kings were still in Kansas City), with the Lakers sweeping the Kings 3–0.

In 1996, the Lakers signed future MVP Shaquille O'Neal in free agency, and traded for future MVP Kobe Bryant in the 1996 NBA draft. In 2000, Phil Jackson from the Chicago Bulls dynasty was hired as head coach. Meanwhile, the Kings qualified for the playoffs in 1996, and would be a perennial playoff team between 1998 and 2006, becoming known as The Greatest Show On Court. The Kings were coached by Rick Adelman and led by Chris Webber, Vlade Divac, Peja Stojaković, Jason Williams, Bobby Jackson, among others. During this time, a bitter rivalry between the teams would be renewed, facing each other in consecutive playoff series between 2000 and 2002. The Lakers would defeat the Kings in 5 games in the 2000 Western Conference First Round, while they would sweep the Kings the following year in the 2001 Semifinals en route to back-to-back championships.

=== 2002 Western Conference Finals ===
==== Lead up ====
During the 2001 offseason, the Kings traded Williams to the Memphis Grizzlies for Mike Bibby, who would create more stability at point guard. That season, they would finish with the best record in the NBA at 61–21. Meanwhile, the Lakers, despite an arthritic toe from O'Neal, would finish 58-24 and claimed the third seed in the Western Conference. In the playoffs, the Kings defeated the Utah Jazz and Dallas Mavericks in the playoffs to advance to the Western Conference Finals, while the Lakers would defeat the Portland Trail Blazers and San Antonio Spurs to face off with the Kings.

==== Game 1 and 2 ====
The Lakers and Kings split the first two games in Sacramento. Los Angeles raced out to a 36-point first quarter in Game 1 behind 67% shooting and never trailed, paced by Kobe Bryant's 30 point effort and 26 points from Shaquille O'Neal. Chris Webber had 28 points and 14 rebounds, but the other Kings combined shot under 40 percent. Sacramento rebounded to win Game 2, paced behind Webber (21 points, 13 rebounds) and Mike Bibby (20 points). O'Neal had 35 points and 13 rebounds, but struggled with foul trouble; Bryant shot 9-for-21 from the field and was suffering from food poisoning which he contracted from a meal at the team hotel, and some felt it was done deliberately by the hotel staff. The loss snapped the NBA record 12-game playoff road winning streak for the Lakers.

==== Game 3 ====
The Kings went to Staples Center and dominated Game 3 to regain home-court advantage, leading by as many as 27 and never trailing. They were again paced by Webber and Bibby, who combined for 50 points, and got solid contributions from Doug Christie (17 points, 12 rebounds, 6 assists, 3 steals) and Vlade Divac (11 points, 9 rebounds and 3 blocks). Other than a brief 3-point barrage in the 4th quarter by the Lakers to cut the lead to 12, there was not much help provided for O'Neal, who had 20 points and 19 rebounds.

==== Game 4 ====
Horry for the win... YES!"

— NBC play-by-play announcer Marv Albert calling Robert Horry's Game 4 game-winning three pointer.

In Game 4, Sacramento again got out to a fast start with a 40-point first quarter and built a 24-point first half lead. However, the Lakers cut the lead to 14 at halftime with a Samaki Walker 3-pointer at the buzzer that should not have counted (replay was not used at the time), and to 7 after three quarters. They whittled it down to 2 on the final possession with a chance to tie or win it, but Bryant missed a running layup and Shaq missed a put-back attempt. Divac knocked the ball away from the hoop in an attempt to run out the clock, but instead it wound up going to a wide open Robert Horry behind the 3 point line, who hit the 3 over Webber at the buzzer to give the Lakers an improbable victory, which tied the series going back to Sacramento. Horry scored 11 of his 18 points in the 4th quarter, including two more crucial 3-pointers. O'Neal finished with 27 points and 18 rebounds, Bryant had 25. Divac, Webber and Bibby all finished with 20+ points for the Kings.

==== Game 5 ====
As the series shifted back to Sacramento for Game 5, the Kings trailed almost the entire fourth quarter, but a jump shot by Bibby off a screen with 8.2 seconds left gave them the lead and was the game-winner in a 92–91 win. Bibby scored 23 in all, and Webber had 29 points and 13 rebounds in support. Bryant led Los Angeles with 30 points, but missed a potential game winner at the buzzer. O'Neal had 28 points, but did not take a shot in the 4th quarter and fouled out.

==== Game 6 ====
Game 6 is considered to be one of the most controversial games in not just NBA history, but arguably all of North American professional sports history, as numerous questionable calls went against the Kings in the fourth quarter. The Lakers, led by O'Neal's 41 points and 17 rebounds, won 106–102, setting the stage for Game 7 in Sacramento. There are allegations that the game was affected by the referees in relationship to the Tim Donaghy scandal. The Lakers shot 40 free throws overall, 27 in the fourth quarter alone, and the Kings' big men were plagued with foul trouble (Divac, Webber, Scot Pollard, and Lawrence Funderburke were called for 20 fouls, with Divac and Scot Pollard both fouling out). Webber nearly had a triple double (26 points, 13 rebounds and 8 assists), Bibby scored 23, and Divac had 12 points and 12 rebounds. The Washington Post sports columnist Michael Wilbon responded to the calls in Game 6: "I wrote down in my notebook six calls that were stunningly incorrect, all against Sacramento, all in the fourth quarter when the Lakers made five baskets and 21 foul shots to hold on to their championship." For example, Wilbon pointed out that Kobe Bryant did not get a foul called on him after elbowing Mike Bibby in front of an official.

==== Game 7 ====
Game 7 was tense, featuring 16 ties and 19 lead changes. In the final ten seconds with Los Angeles up 99–98, Peja Stojaković air-balled a wide open 3, and O'Neal was fouled on the rebound. After O'Neal hit 1 of 2 free throws, Bibby was fouled by Bryant and made both free throws to force overtime. The Kings' offense stalled in the extra period, and the Lakers prevailed 112–106. Sacramento was undone by poor free throw shooting (16–30 from the line), a horrid 2–20 from behind the arc, and a seeming unwillingness for anyone other than Bibby to take crucial shots down the stretch. O'Neal scored 35 and Bryant added 30 in the victory, as all five Lakers starters finished in double figures. Bibby finished with 29 points, and Webber finished with 20 points, 11 rebounds, and 8 assists. Divac added 15 points and 10 rebounds. To date, this is the latest postseason meeting between the two teams.

==== Series Overview ====
The 2002 Western Conference Finals was widely regarded as one of the best series in NBA playoff history, with the last four games coming down to the final seconds. Two games were decided on game winning shots and Game 7 was decided in overtime. However, the series was marred by controversy and allegations of corruption. On June 10, 2008, convicted NBA referee Tim Donaghy's attorney filed a court document alleging that Game 6 was fixed by two referees. The letter states that Donaghy "learned from Referee A that Referees A and F wanted to extend the series to seven games. Tim knew Referees A and F to be 'company men', always acting in the interest of the NBA, and that night, it was in the NBA's interest to add another game to the series." The Lakers won Game 6 106–102, attempting 18 more free throws than the Kings in the fourth quarter, and went on to win the series, and eventually the NBA championship. The document claimed that Donaghy told federal agents that in order to increase television ratings and ticket sales, "top executives of the NBA sought to manipulate games using referees". It also said that NBA officials would tell referees to not call technical fouls on certain players, and states that a referee was privately reprimanded by the league for ejecting a star player in the first quarter of a January 2000 game. Stern denied the accusations, calling Donaghy a "singing, cooperating witness".

The Lakers would go on to win the 2002 NBA Finals, sweeping the New Jersey Nets and completing their three-peat.

=== Aftermath ===
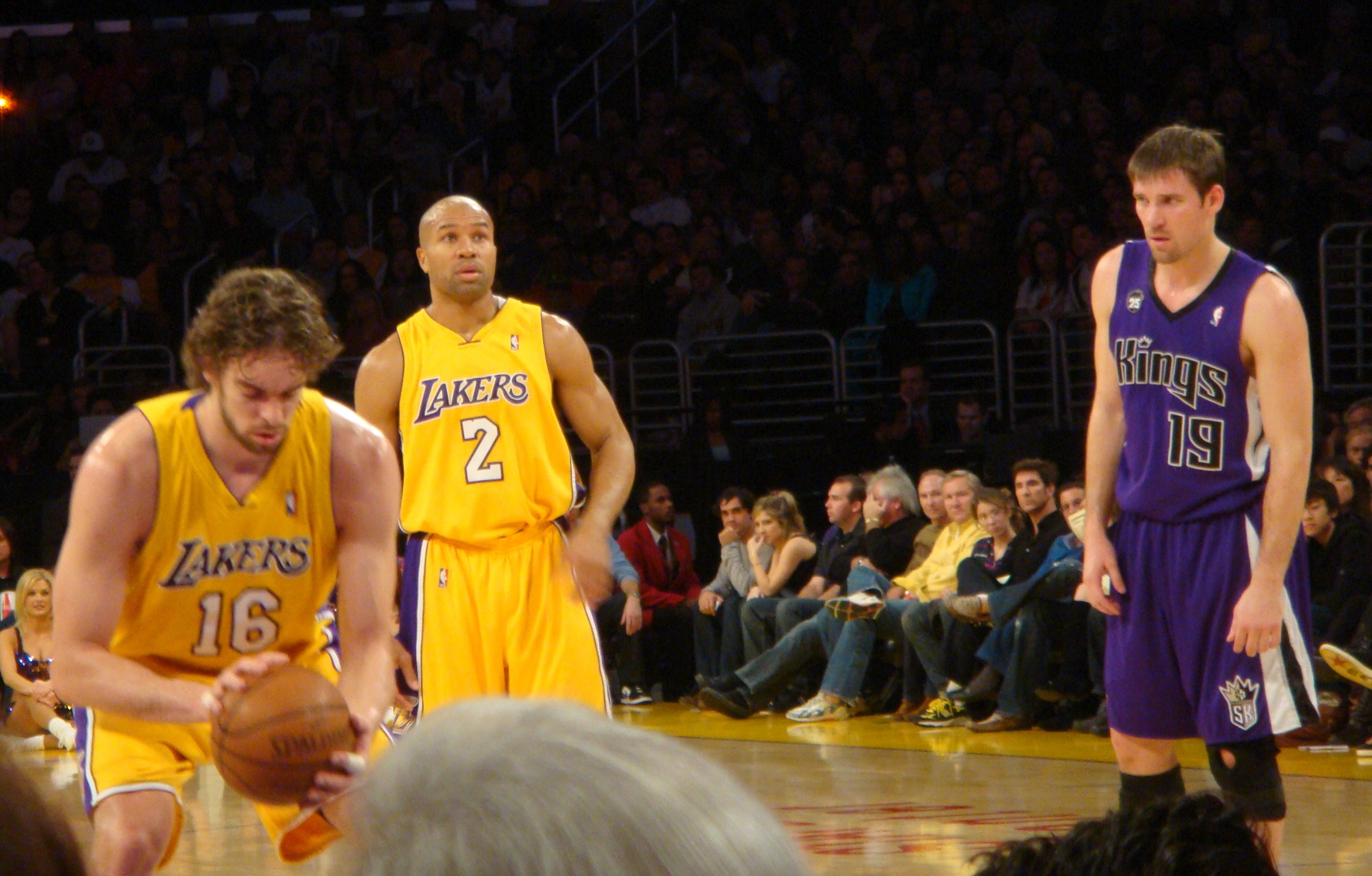
Pau Gasol (left) attempting a free throw against the Sacramento Kings, with teammate Derek Fisher (center) and Beno Udrih (right) looking on, during a regular season game on January 2, 2010.

Doug Christie punched Rick Fox in the pre-season game in October. Both players would be ejected and had another fight in the back near the locker room area before being separated. In 2003, the King would lose the Western Conference Semifinals to the Dallas Mavericks after Webber tore his ACL. The Lakers would also lose in the Semifinals to the Spurs, who went on to win the 2003 NBA Finals. In the 2004 NBA Playoffs, the Kings would lose in the Semifinals to the Minnesota Timberwolves in seven games, while the Lakers would lose the 2004 NBA Finals to the Detroit Pistons. After playoff appearances in 2005 and 2006, the Kings would fail to qualify for the playoffs again until 2023. In 2008, Scot Pollard who played for the Kings would get some revenge on the Lakers as he was a member of the Celtics team that beat the Lakers in the 2008 NBA Finals. Additionally, the Kings would be threatened with relocation between 2006 and 2013 before building Golden 1 Center, moving there in 2016. Meanwhile, the Lakers have since won three more championships in 2009, 2010, and 2020 being led by players like Bryant, Pau Gasol, LeBron James, and Anthony Davis, bringing their championship count to 17.

Despite not meeting in the postseason since the 2002 Western Conference Finals to date, bitterness between the teams remain due to the series. In 2023, the two qualified for the same postseason for the first time since 2006. However, the Sacramento Kings lost to the Golden State Warriors in seven games while the Los Angeles Lakers defeated the Memphis Grizzlies in six games, preventing a playoff series between the two.

During the 2023–2024 season, both teams advanced to the quarterfinals of the 2023 NBA In-Season Tournament, but a Kings loss to the New Orleans Pelicans prevented a semifinal matchup in Las Vegas against the Lakers, who would go on to win the inaugural tournament. Both teams were in the 2024 NBA Play-In Tournament, with the Lakers and Kings finishing the regular season as the 8th and 9th seed, respectively. While the Kings defeated the 10th seed Golden State Warriors, the Lakers defeated the 7th seed New Orleans Pelicans, who would defeat the Kings to advance in the tournament, preventing a postseason matchup.

Both teams are also slated to face each other in West Group C of the 2026 NBA Cup.

== Season-by-season results ==
Rochester/Cincinnati Royals/Kansas City-Omaha/Kansas City/Sacramento Kings vs. Minneapolis/Los Angeles Lakers Season-by-Season Results
1940s (Lakers, 9–5)

Season	Season series		at Rochester Royals	at Minneapolis Lakers	Overall series	Notes
1948–49	Lakers	4–2	Lakers, 2–1	Lakers, 2–1	Lakers; 4–2	The National Basketball League (NBL) merged with the Basketball Association of America (BAA), with the Lakers and Royals placed in the Western Division, becoming divisional rivals. Royals win their first Western Division. Royals finish with the best record in the league (45–15).
1949 Western Division Finals	Lakers	2–0	Lakers, 1–0	Lakers, 1–0	Lakers; 6–2	First postseason series. Lakers go on to win 1949 BAA Finals.
1949–50	Tie	3–3	Royals, 3–0	Lakers, 3–0	Lakers; 9–5	The Basketball Association of America merged with the National Basketball Association (NBA). Lakers and Royals temporarily move to the Central Division. Lakers win the inaugural 1950 NBA Finals.

1950s (Lakers, 72–54)

Season	Season series		at Rochester Royals/Cincinnati Royals	at Minneapolis Lakers	at Neutral Site	Overall series	Notes
1950–51	Tie	4–4	Royals, 3–1	Lakers, 3–1		Lakers; 13–9	Royals and Lakers move back to the Western Division. Lakers win their first Western Division. Lakers finish with the best record in the league (44–24).
1951 Western Division Finals	Royals	3–1	Royals, 2–0	Tie, 1–1		Lakers; 14–12	Royals/Kings' first and as of November 16, 2026 only postseason series win against the Lakers. Royals go on to win 1951 NBA Finals.
1951–52	Lakers	7–2	Tie, 2–2	Lakers, 5–0		Lakers; 21–14	Royals win the Western Division. Royals finish with the best record in the league (41–25).
1952 Western Division Finals	Lakers	3–1	Tie, 1–1	Lakers, 2–0		Lakers; 25–15	Lakers go on to win 1952 NBA Finals.
1952–53	Royals	6–4	Royals, 5–0	Lakers, 4–0	Royals, 1–0	Lakers; 28–21	Neutral site game was played at Milwaukee Arena, Milwaukee, Wisconsin. Lakers win the Western Division. Royals record their first season series win against the Lakers. Lakers finish with the best record in the league (48–22). Lakers win 1953 NBA Finals.
1953–54	Lakers	6–5	Tie, 2–2	Lakers, 3–0	Royals, 3–1	Lakers; 34–26	Neutral site games were played at: War Memorial Coliseum, Fort Wayne, Indiana; Chicago Stadium, Chicago, Illinois; Hibbing Memorial Building, Hibbing, Minnesota; Indiana State Fair Coliseum, Indianapolis, Indiana; Lakers win the Western Division. Lakers finish with the best record in the league (46–26)
1954 Western Division Round-Robin	Lakers	1–0		Lakers, 1–0		Lakers; 35–26	Only season in NBA history to use round-robin playoff format. Lakers (3–0) and Royals (2–1) finish above the Fort Wayne Pistons (0–4) as the 1st and 2nd seeds respectively, setting up a Western Division Finals postseason series.
1954 Western Division Finals	Lakers	2–1	Royals, 1–0	Lakers, 2–0		Lakers; 37–27	Lakers go on to win 1954 NBA Finals.
1954–55	Lakers	8–4	Lakers, 4–1	Lakers, 3–1	Royals, 2–1	Lakers; 45–31	Neutral site games were played at: Buffalo Memorial Auditorium, Buffalo, New York; Spencer Fieldhouse, Spencer, Iowa; War Memorial Coliseum; Lakers win 18 home games in a row against the Royals.
1955 Western Division Semifinals	Lakers	2–1	Royals, 1–0	Lakers, 2–0		Lakers; 47–32	Royals play their final home game at Edgerton Park Arena. Last playoff matchup the Lakers faced the Royals as a Rochester, New York-based team and under the name "Royals"
1955–56	Lakers	7–5	Royals, 3–2	Lakers, 3–2	Lakers, 2–0	Lakers; 54–37	Both neutral site games were played at Kiel Auditorium, St. Louis, Missouri. Royals open Rochester Community War Memorial (now known as Blue Cross Arena).
1956–57	Lakers	9–3	Royals, 2–1	Lakers, 4–0	Lakers, 4–1	Lakers; 63–40	Neutral site games were played at: Cambria County War Memorial Arena, Johnstown, Pennsylvania; Madison Square Garden (III), New York City, New York; Washington Avenue Armory, Albany, New York; Kentucky State Fairgrounds, Louisville, Kentucky; Boston Garden, Boston, Massachusetts; Final season Royals played as a Rochester–based team.
1957–58	Royals	8–4	Royals, 4–1	Lakers, 3–2	Royals, 2–0	Lakers; 67–48	Neutral site games were played at: Detroit Olympia, Detroit, Michigan; Kiel Auditorium; Royals relocate to Cincinnati and play at Cincinnati Gardens.
1958–59	Tie	6–6	Royals, 3–1	Lakers, 2–0	Tie, 3–3	Lakers; 73–54	Neutral site games were played at: Kiel Auditorium; Charleston Civic Center, Charleston, West Virginia; Sam Houston Coliseum, Houston, Texas; Cow Palace, Daly City, California; Oregon Centennial Exposition Pavilion, Portland, Oregon; Detroit Olympia; Royals and Lakers play 5 neutral site games in a row and 3 back–to–back. Lakers lose 1959 NBA Finals.
1959–60	Lakers	8–5	Tie, 3–3	Tie, 2–2	Lakers, 3–0	Lakers; 81–59	Neutral site games were played at: Detroit Olympia; Rhode Island Auditorium, Providence, Rhode Island; Philadelphia Arena, Philadelphia, Pennsylvania; Lakers temporarily play at Minneapolis Armory. Last season the Lakers played as a Minneapolis-based team.

1960s (Lakers, 52–38)

Season	Season series		at Cincinnati Royals	at Los Angeles Lakers	at Neutral Site	Overall series	Notes
1960–61	Royals	8–5	Royals, 5–0	Tie, 2–2	Lakers, 3–1	Lakers; 86–67	Neutral site games were played at: Madison Square Garden (III); Kiel Auditorium; Cole Field House, College Park, Maryland; University of Dayton Fieldhouse, Dayton, Ohio; Lakers relocate to Los Angeles and play at Los Angeles Memorial Sports Arena.
1961–62	Lakers	7–5	Royals, 3–1	Lakers, 4–1	Lakers, 2–1	Lakers; 93–72	Neutral site games were played at: Madison Square Garden (III); Mountaineer Field House at West Virginia University, Morgantown, West Virginia; University of Dayton Fieldhouse; Final season until the 1988 season the Kings and Lakers played in the same division. Lakers win the Western Division. Lakers lose 1962 NBA Finals.
1962–63	Lakers	6–3	Tie, 2–2	Lakers, 3–1	Lakers, 1–0	Lakers; 99–75	Neutral site game was played at Madison Square Garden (III). Royals were moved to the Eastern Division. Lakers lose 1963 NBA Finals.
1963–64	Tie	4–4	Tie, 2–2	Tie, 2–2		Lakers; 103–79	Lakers record their 100th win over the Royals/Kings.
1964–65	Royals	6–4	Royals, 5–0	Lakers, 4–1		Lakers; 107–85	Lakers lose 1965 NBA Finals.
1965–66	Lakers	6–4	Royals, 3–1	Lakers, 4–1	Lakers, 1–0	Lakers; 113–89	Neutral site game was played at Indiana State Fair Coliseum. Lakers lose 1966 NBA Finals.
1966–67	Lakers	6–3	Lakers, 2–1	Lakers, 3–1	Tie, 1–1	Lakers; 119–92	Neutral site games were played at: University of Dayton Fieldhouse; Cleveland Arena, Cleveland, Ohio; Lakers finish with a road winning record against the Kings since the 1954 season.
1967–68	Lakers	6–1	Tie, 1–1	Lakers, 4–0	Lakers, 1–0	Lakers; 125–93	Neutral site game was played at Cleveland Arena. Lakers move to The Forum on December 31, 1967. (now known as Kia Forumn). On February 6, 1968, Lakers beat the Royals 146–102, their largest victory against the Royals/Kings with a 44–point differential and their most points scored in a game against the Royals/Kings. Lakers lose 1968 NBA Finals.
1968–69	Lakers	4–2	Royals, 2–0	Lakers, 3–0	Lakers, 1–0	Lakers; 129–95	Neutral site game was played at Cleveland Arena. Lakers lose 1969 NBA Finals.
1969–70	Lakers	4–2	Lakers, 2–0	Royals, 2–1	Lakers, 1–0	Lakers; 133–97	Neutral site game was played at Cleveland Arena. Royals finish with a road-winning record against the Lakers for the first time. Lakers lose 1970 NBA Finals.

1970s (Lakers, 33–16)

Season	Season series		at Cincinnati Royals/Kansas City-Omaha Kings/Kansas City Kings	at Los Angeles Lakers	at Neutral Site	Overall series	Notes
1970–71	Lakers	4–1	Lakers, 1–0	Lakers, 2–0	Tie, 1–1	Lakers; 137–98	Neutral site games were played at: Omaha Civic Auditorium, Omaha, Nebraska; Maple Leaf Gardens, Toronto, Ontario, Canada; Final season where the two teams play on a neutral site. Royals are placed in the Eastern Conference and the Central Division. Lakers are placed in the Western Conference and the Pacific Division. On January 5, 1971, Royals beat the Lakers 146–112, their largest victory against the Lakers with a 34–point differential and their most points scored in a game against the Lakers.
1971–72	Lakers	4–1	Tie, 1–1	Lakers, 3–0		Lakers; 141–99	Final season Royals play as a Cincinnati–based team and under the name "Royals". Lakers finish with the best record in the league (69–13). Lakers win 1972 NBA Finals.
1972–73	Lakers	5–1	Lakers, 3–0	Lakers, 2–1		Lakers; 146–100	Royals relocated to Kansas City and Omaha, playing at Municipal Auditorium and Omaha Civic Auditorium respectively, and changed their name to the Kansas City–Omaha Kings. Kings are placed in the Western Conference and the Midwest Division. Kings record their 100th win over the Lakers. Lakers lose 1973 NBA Finals.
1973–74	Lakers	5–1	Lakers, 2–1	Lakers, 3–0		Lakers; 151–101	
1974–75	Kings	3–1	Kings, 2–0	Tie, 1–1		Lakers; 152–104	Kings open Kemper Arena (now known as Hy-Vee Arena). Last season until the 1992 season the Kings would win a game at Los Angeles. Kings win the season series against the Lakers for the first time since the 1964 season.
1975–76	Lakers	3–2	Kings, 2–0	Lakers, 3–0		Lakers; 155–106	Kings shorten their name to the Kansas City Kings.
1976–77	Lakers	3–1	Tie, 1–1	Lakers, 2–0		Lakers; 158–107	Lakers finish with the best record in the league (53–29).
1977–78	Tie	2–2	Kings, 2–0	Lakers, 2–0		Lakers; 160–109	The season series is split for the first time since the 1963 season.
1978–79	Tie	2–2	Kings, 2–0	Lakers, 2–0		Lakers; 162–111	Kings fully play their home games in Kansas City.
1979–80	Lakers	4–2	Kings, 2–1	Lakers, 3–0		Lakers; 166–113	Due to a June 1979 storm that caused the collapse of Kemper Arena's roof, the Kings played a majority of their home games at Municipal Auditorium. Lakers win 1980 NBA Finals.

1980s (Lakers, 50–4)

Season	Season series		at Kansas City Kings/Sacramento Kings	at Los Angeles Lakers	Overall series	Notes
1980–81	Lakers	5–0	Lakers, 2–0	Lakers, 3–0	Lakers; 171–113	
1981–82	Lakers	4–1	Lakers, 2–1	Lakers, 2–0	Lakers; 175–114	Lakers win 1982 NBA Finals.
1982–83	Lakers	4–1	Tie, 1–1	Lakers, 3–0	Lakers; 179–115	Lakers lose 1983 NBA Finals.
1983–84	Lakers	5–0	Lakers, 3–0	Lakers, 2–0	Lakers; 184–115	
1984 Western Conference First Round	Lakers	3–0	Lakers, 1–0	Lakers, 2–0	Lakers; 187–115	Only playoff matchup the Lakers faced the Kings as a Kansas City–based team. Lakers go on to lose 1984 NBA Finals.
1984–85	Lakers	5–0	Lakers, 2–0	Lakers, 3–0	Lakers; 192–115	Final season Kings played as a Kansas City–based team. Lakers win 1985 NBA Finals.
1985–86	Lakers	5–0	Lakers, 3–0	Lakers, 2–0	Lakers; 197–115	Kings relocate to Sacramento, becoming an in-state rival for the Lakers, and open ARCO Arena I.
1986–87	Lakers	5–0	Lakers, 2–0	Lakers, 3–0	Lakers; 202–115	Lakers record their 200th win over the Kings. Lakers finish with the best record in the league (65–17). Lakers win 1987 NBA Finals.
1987–88	Lakers	4–1	Lakers, 2–1	Lakers, 2–0	Lakers; 206–116	Lakers win 27 games in a row against the Kings and 12 road games in a row against the Kings. Lakers finish with the best record in the league (62–20). Lakers win 1988 NBA Finals.
1988–89	Lakers	5–1	Lakers, 2–1	Lakers, 3–0	Lakers; 211–117	Kings are moved to the Pacific Division, once again becoming divisional rivals with the Lakers. Kings open ARCO Arena. Lakers win the Pacific Division. Lakers lose 1989 NBA Finals.
1989–90	Lakers	5–0	Lakers, 2–0	Lakers, 3–0	Lakers; 216–117	One Lakers' home game was played on Martin Luther King Jr. Day. Lakers win the Pacific Division. Lakers finish with the best record in the league (63–19). Lakers finish the decade without losing a single home game to the Kings.

1990s (Lakers, 30–13)

Season	Season series		at Sacramento Kings	at Los Angeles Lakers	Overall series	Notes
1990–91	Lakers	4–0	Lakers, 2–0	Lakers, 2–0	Lakers; 220–117	Lakers lose 1991 NBA Finals.
1991–92	Lakers	4–1	Lakers, 2–1	Lakers, 2–0	Lakers; 224–118	Lakers win 17 games in a row against the Kings.
1992–93	Lakers	3–2	Tie, 1–1	Lakers, 2–1	Lakers; 227–120	Lakers win 45 home games in a row against the Kings, an NBA record. Kings record their first win at Los Angeles since the 1974 season.
1993–94	Kings	4–1	Kings, 3–0	Tie, 1–1	Lakers; 228–124	Following their win against the Kings on April 6, 1994, Lakers go on a 10-game losing streak. Kings finish with a winning record at home for the first time since the 1979 season and win the season series against the Lakers for the first time since the 1974 season.
1994–95	Lakers	3–2	Kings, 2–0	Lakers, 3–0	Lakers; 231–126	
1995–96	Lakers	3–1	Lakers, 2–0	Tie, 1–1	Lakers; 234–127	
1996–97	Lakers	4–0	Lakers, 2–0	Lakers, 2–0	Lakers; 238–127	
1997–98	Lakers	4–0	Lakers, 2–0	Lakers, 2–0	Lakers; 242–127	Lakers win 10 games in a row against the Kings.
1998–99	Kings	2–1	Tie, 1–1	Kings, 1–0	Lakers; 243–129	Kings finish with a winning record at Los Angeles for the first time since the 1969 season. Last season Lakers played at Great Western Forum.
1999–2000	Lakers	3–1	Tie, 1–1	Lakers, 2–0	Lakers; 246–130	Lakers open up Staples Center (now known as Crypto.com Arena). Lakers win the Pacific Division. Lakers finish with the best record in the league (67–15).

2000s (Lakers, 36–20)

Season	Season series		at Sacramento Kings	at Los Angeles Lakers	Overall series	Notes
2000 Western Conference First Round	Lakers	3–2	Kings, 2–0	Lakers, 3–0	Lakers; 249–132	First playoff series Lakers faced the Kings as a Sacramento–based team. Lakers go on to win 2000 NBA Finals.
2000–01	Lakers	3–1	Lakers, 2–0	Tie, 1–1	Lakers; 252–133	Lakers win the Pacific Division.
2001 Western Conference Semifinals	Lakers	4–0	Lakers, 2–0	Lakers, 2–0	Lakers; 256–133	Lakers win 14 home playoff games in a row against the Kings. Lakers go on to win 2001 NBA Finals.
2001–02	Lakers	3–1	Tie, 1–1	Lakers, 2–0	Lakers; 259–134	Kings win their first Pacific Division and their first division title since the 1978 season. Kings finish with the best record in the league (61–21).
2002 Western Conference Finals	Lakers	4–3	Tie, 2–2	Lakers, 2–1	Lakers; 263–137	Kings record their first playoff win at Los Angeles and their first road win against the Lakers since the 1951 Western Division Finals. Lakers go on to win 2002 NBA Finals.
2002–03	Tie	2–2	Tie, 1–1	Tie, 1–1	Lakers; 265–139	One Lakers' home game was played on Christmas. Kings win the Pacific Division. The season series is split for the first time since the 1978 season.
2003–04	Kings	3–1	Kings, 2–0	Tie, 1–1	Lakers; 266–142	Lakers win the Pacific Division. Lakers lose 2004 NBA Finals.
2004–05	Kings	3–1	Tie, 1–1	Kings, 2–0	Lakers; 267–145	Kings finish with a winning record at Los Angeles in two games or more for the first time since the 1969 season.
2005–06	Tie	2–2	Kings, 2–0	Lakers, 2–0	Lakers; 269–147	
2006–07	Lakers	3–1	Lakers, 2–0	Tie, 1–1	Lakers; 272–148	
2007–08	Lakers	3–1	Lakers, 2–0	Tie, 1–1	Lakers; 275–149	Lakers win the Pacific Division. Lakers lose 2008 NBA Finals.
2008–09	Lakers	3–1	Tie, 1–1	Lakers, 2–0	Lakers; 278–150	Lakers win the Pacific Division. Lakers win 2009 NBA Finals.
2009–10	Lakers	4–0	Lakers, 2–0	Lakers, 2–0	Lakers; 282–150	Lakers win the Pacific Division. Lakers win 2010 NBA Finals.

2010s (Lakers, 20–18)

Season	Season series		at Sacramento Kings	at Los Angeles Lakers	Overall series	Notes
2010–11	Lakers	3–1	Lakers, 2–0	Tie, 1–1	Lakers; 285–151	Lakers win the Pacific Division.
2011–12	Kings	2–1	Kings, 2–0	Lakers, 1–0	Lakers; 286–153	Lakers win the Pacific Division.
2012–13	Lakers	3–1	Tie, 1–1	Lakers, 2–0	Lakers; 289–154	
2013–14	Lakers	3–1	Tie, 1–1	Lakers, 2–0	Lakers; 292–155	
2014–15	Kings	3–1	Kings, 2–0	Tie, 1–1	Lakers; 293–158	
2015–16	Kings	4–0	Kings, 2–0	Kings, 2–0	Lakers; 293–162	Last season Kings played at Sleep Train Arena (now known as ARCO Arena). Kings record their first season series sweep against the Lakers.
2016–17	Tie	2–2	Tie, 1–1	Tie, 1–1	Lakers; 295–164	Kings open Golden 1 Center.
2017–18	Tie	2–2	Tie, 1–1	Tie, 1–1	Lakers; 297–166	
2018–19	Lakers	3–1	Tie, 1–1	Lakers, 2–0	Lakers; 300–167	First season for LeBron James as a Laker. Lakers record their 300th win over the Kings.
2019–20	Lakers	2–1	Lakers, 1–0	Tie, 1–1	Lakers; 302–168	Due to the COVID-19 pandemic suspending the season, their remaining game at Sacramento was canceled, while their remaining game at Los Angeles was played in the 2020 NBA Bubble. Lakers win the Pacific Division. Lakers win 2020 NBA Finals.

2020s (Kings, 12–11)

Season	Season series		at Sacramento Kings	at Los Angeles Lakers	Overall series	Notes
2020–21	Kings	2–1	Tie, 1–1	Kings, 1–0	Lakers; 303–170	
2021–22	Tie	2–2	Tie, 1–1	Tie, 1–1	Lakers; 305–172	
2022–23	Kings	3–1	Tie, 1–1	Kings, 2–0	Lakers; 306–175	Kings win their first Chuck Cooper Trophy and their first divisional title since 2002 season.
2023–24	Kings	4–0	Kings, 2–0	Kings, 2–0	Lakers; 306–179	Lakers win the inaugural 2023 NBA Cup.
2024–25	Lakers	4–0	Lakers, 2–0	Lakers, 2–0	Lakers; 310–179	First season for Luka Doncic as a Laker. Lakers win the Pacific Division.
2025–26	Lakers	3–1	Tie, 1–1	Lakers, 2–0	Lakers; 313–180	Final season for LeBron James as a Laker. Lakers win the Pacific Division.
2026–27	Tie	0-0	November 4th, 2026 and January 19th, 2027	November 20th, 2026 and January 22nd, 2027	Lakers; 313–180	The game on November 20, 2026, at Los Angeles is a 2026 NBA Cup group stage game.

Summary of Results

Season	Season series		at Rochester/Cincinnati Royals Kansas City-Omaha/Kansas City/Sacramento Kings	at Minneapolis/Los Angeles Lakers	at Neutral Site	Notes
Regular season games	Lakers	287–169	Kings, 107–99	Lakers, 163–46	Lakers, 26–16	
Postseason games	Lakers	25–11	Kings, 9–7	Lakers, 18–2		Includes the 1954 Western Division Round Robin in which the Lakers won their sole game against the Royals/Kings, accounted as a Lakers' home game.
Postseason series	Lakers	8–1	Lakers, 3–0	Lakers, 5–1		Western Division Semifinals: 1955; Western Division Finals: 1949, 1951, 1952, 1954; Western Conference First Round: 1984, 2000; Western Conference Semifinals: 2001; Western Conference Finals: 2002
Regular and postseason	Lakers	313–180	Kings, 116–106	Lakers, 181–48	Lakers, 26–16	There were 42 total neutral site games played.: 5 games at Kiel Auditorium; 4 games at Madison Square Garden (III) and Cleveland Arena; 3 games at Detroit Olympia and University of Dayton Fieldhouse; 2 games at War Memorial Coliseum and Indiana State Fair Coliseum; 1 game at Milwaukee Arena, Chicago Stadium, Hibbing Memorial Building, Buffalo Memorial Auditorium, Spencer Fieldhouse, Cambria County War Memorial Arena, Washington Avenue Armory, Kentucky State Fairgrounds, Boston Garden, Charleston Civic Center, Sam Houston Coliseum, Cow Palace, Oregon Centennial Exposition Pavilion, Rhode Island Auditorium, Philadelphia Arena, Cole Field House, Mountaineer Field House at West Virginia University, Omaha Civic Auditorium, and Maple Leaf Gardens.
