= 2002 NBA playoffs =

Basketball competition

Tournament details
- Dates: April 20–June 12, 2002
- Season: 2001–02
- Teams: 16

Final positions
- Champions: Los Angeles Lakers (14th title)
- Runners-up: New Jersey Nets
- Semifinalists: Boston Celtics; Sacramento Kings

Tournament statistics
- Scoring leader(s): Shaquille O'Neal (Lakers) (28.5 PPG)

Awards
- MVP: Shaquille O'Neal (Lakers)

The 2002 NBA playoffs were the postseason tournament of the National Basketball Association's 2001–02 season. This was the final postseason that held a best-of-5 first-round series; the 2003 NBA playoffs saw those series expand to a best-of-7 format. The tournament concluded with the Western Conference champion Los Angeles Lakers defeating the Eastern Conference champion New Jersey Nets 4 games to 0 in the 2002 NBA Finals. Shaquille O'Neal was named NBA Finals MVP for the third straight year.

The 2002 playoffs are best remembered for that year's Western Conference Finals between the two-time defending champion Los Angeles Lakers and the Sacramento Kings. The matchup between the Lakers and Kings is regarded as one of the most controversial playoff series in NBA history. At the time, there was widespread criticism of the officiating as favoring the Lakers, especially in Game 6. Several years later, disgraced referee Tim Donaghy accused the Game 6 officiating crew of fixing the game, at the behest of the NBA's front office.

== Overview ==
The 2002 NBA Playoffs marked the return of the Boston Celtics, who had last made the playoffs in 1995. In addition, the New Jersey Nets returned to the playoffs for the first time since 1998.

This also marked the last appearance of the Charlotte Hornets in the playoffs until 2010. The Hornets moved the next year to New Orleans, while an expansion team, formerly the Bobcats, was formed in 2004. The Hornets were renamed the Pelicans in 2013, after which the Bobcats reclaimed the Hornets name in 2014. The Hornets also reclaimed the history and records of the 1988–2002 Charlotte teams. This was also the most recent season in which the Hornets won a playoff series; since returning in 2004, the Hornets/Bobcats franchise only won a combined three playoff games, all in 2016, and failed to win a single game under the Bobcats branding.

The New York Knicks missed the playoffs for the first time since 1987, while the Miami Heat missed the playoffs for the first time since 1995. With that, Pat Riley missed the playoffs for the first time in his coaching career. Also the Phoenix Suns missed the playoffs for the first time since 1988.

With their first round series win over the Philadelphia 76ers, the Boston Celtics won their first playoff series since 1992.

With their first round series win over the Toronto Raptors, the Detroit Pistons won their first playoff series since 1991.

With their first round series win over the Indiana Pacers, the New Jersey Nets won a playoff series for the first time since 1984.

With similar sweeps on April 28, the Minnesota Timberwolves and Portland Trail Blazers were the final teams to lose in three-game sweep; they fell to the Dallas Mavericks and Los Angeles Lakers respectively.

Game 4 of the Nets–Hornets series was the final playoff game ever played at Charlotte Coliseum.

Game 5 of the Lakers–Spurs series was the last NBA playoff game aired on TBS. Additionally, this was the last NBA playoff game to take place in what is known as a multipurpose stadium and the last game at the Alamodome.

With their conference semifinals victory over the Charlotte Hornets, the New Jersey Nets made the Eastern Conference Finals for the first time in franchise history. It also marked the first time the Nets won a best of seven playoff series in franchise history.

With their conference semifinals victory over the Detroit Pistons, the Boston Celtics made their first Eastern Conference Finals appearance since 1988.

In Game 3 of the Eastern Conference Finals, the Boston Celtics created the biggest 4th quarter playoff comeback in Game 3, winning 94–90 after trailing by as much as 21 prior to the fourth quarter. (This record was later broken by the Los Angeles Clippers, who came back from 24 in the fourth quarter against the Memphis Grizzlies in 2012).

With their Game 6 win over the Boston Celtics, the New Jersey Nets made the NBA Finals for the first time in franchise history, preventing a Celtics–Lakers NBA Finals.

The Lakers’ Game 7 win over the Sacramento Kings marked the first time since 1982 that a road team won a Game 7 in the conference finals.

The 2002 NBA Finals marked the first time since 1995 that a team swept an NBA Finals series.

Game 4 of the NBA Finals was the last game telecast on NBC until the 2025–26 season. TBS and NBC were replaced with ESPN and ABC the following season, since both channels are owned by the Walt Disney Company. TBS has aired some NBA basketball in the ensuing years due to conflicts on sister network TNT. The total number of playoff games was 70, including the NBA Finals.

== Bracket ==
First Round	Conference Semifinals
E1	New Jersey*	3
E8	Indiana	2
E1	New Jersey*	4
E4	Charlotte	1
E4	Charlotte	3
E5	Orlando	1
Eastern Conference
E3	Boston	3
E6	Philadelphia	2
E3	Boston	4
E2	Detroit*	1
E2	Detroit*	3
E7	Toronto	2
W1	Sacramento*	3
W8	Utah	1
W1	Sacramento*	4
W4	Dallas	1
W4	Dallas	3
W5	Minnesota	0
Western Conference
W3	LA Lakers	3
W6	Portland	0
W3	LA Lakers	4
W2	San Antonio*	1
W2	San Antonio*	3
W7	Seattle	2

Conference Finals
E1	New Jersey*	4
E3	Boston	2
W1	Sacramento*	3
W3	LA Lakers	4

NBA Finals
E1	New Jersey*	0
W3	LA Lakers	4

- * Division winner
- Bold Series winner
- Italic Team with home-court advantage

== Playoff qualifying ==
=== Western Conference ===
==== Best record in NBA ====
The Sacramento Kings clinched the best record in the NBA and earned home-court advantage throughout the entire playoffs.

==== Clinched a playoff berth ====
The following teams clinched a playoff berth in the West:

1. Sacramento Kings (61–21, clinched Pacific division)
2. San Antonio Spurs (58–24, clinched Midwest division, 3–1 head-to-head vs. LAL)
3. Los Angeles Lakers (58–24, 1–3 head-to-head vs. SAS)
4. Dallas Mavericks (57–25)
5. Minnesota Timberwolves (50–32)
6. Portland Trail Blazers (49–33)
7. Seattle SuperSonics (45–37)
8. Utah Jazz (44–38)

=== Eastern Conference ===
==== Best record in conference ====
The New Jersey Nets clinched the best record in the Eastern Conference and earned home-court advantage throughout the Eastern Conference playoffs.

==== Clinched a playoff berth ====
The following teams clinched a playoff berth in the East:

1. New Jersey Nets (52–30, clinched Atlantic division)
2. Detroit Pistons (50–32, clinched Central division)
3. Boston Celtics (49–33)
4. Charlotte Hornets (44–38, 3–1 head-to-head vs. ORL)
5. Orlando Magic (44–38, 1–3 head-to-head vs. CHA)
6. Philadelphia 76ers (43–39)
7. Toronto Raptors (42–40, 3–1 head-to-head vs. IND)
8. Indiana Pacers (42–40, 1–3 head-to-head vs. TOR)

== First round ==
=== Eastern Conference first round ===
==== (1) New Jersey Nets vs. (8) Indiana Pacers ====
Although the Nets won the series in 5, it would be most remarkable for more playoff heroics by Reggie Miller; Miller banked in a 40-footer at the buzzer to force OT, and then fly in for a dunk over 3 Net defenders with 3.1 seconds left in the extra session to force the 2nd overtime.

NBC

April 20
12:30 PM

Boxscore

Indiana Pacers 89, New Jersey Nets 83
Scoring by quarter: 28–22, 24–20, 11–19, 26–22
Pts: Jermaine O'Neal 30; Rebs: Brad Miller 12; Asts: Jamaal Tinsley 7	Pts: Jason Kidd 26; Rebs: Kenyon Martin 13; Asts: Jason Kidd 9
Indiana leads series, 1–0

Continental Airlines Arena, East Rutherford, New Jersey
Attendance: 18,555
Referees: Dan Crawford, Joe Forte, Leroy Richardson

TNT

April 22
7:00 PM

Boxscore

Indiana Pacers 79, New Jersey Nets 95
Scoring by quarter: 19–18, 19–31, 22–23, 19–23
Pts: Reggie Miller 26; Rebs: Artest, O'Neal 6 each Asts: Jamaal Tinsley 5	Pts: Jason Kidd 20; Rebs: Jason Kidd 10; Asts: Jason Kidd 9
Series tied, 1–1

Continental Airlines Arena, East Rutherford, New Jersey
Attendance: 20,049
Referees: Joe DeRosa, Eddie F. Rush, Mark Wunderlich

TNT

April 26
8:30 PM

Boxscore

New Jersey Nets 85, Indiana Pacers 84
Scoring by quarter: 23–21, 21–16, 20–29, 21–18
Pts: Jason Kidd 24; Rebs: Keith Van Horn 12; Asts: Jason Kidd 11	Pts: Reggie Miller 30; Rebs: Jeff Foster 12; Asts: Jamaal Tinsley 9
New Jersey leads series, 2–1

Conseco Fieldhouse, Indianapolis, Indiana
Attendance: 18,345
Referees: Sean Corbin, Bennett Salvatore, Bill Spooner

TBS

April 30
9:30 PM

Boxscore

New Jersey Nets 74, Indiana Pacers 97
Scoring by quarter: 19–22, 14–16, 20–30, 21–29
Pts: Kenyon Martin 13; Rebs: Kenyon Martin 6 Asts: Jason Kidd 6	Pts: Artest, Croshere 18 each Rebs: Artest, B. Miller 8 each Asts: Kevin Ollie 9
Series tied, 2–2

Conseco Fieldhouse, Indianapolis, Indiana
Attendance: 18,345
Referees: Tim Donaghy, Steve Javie, Tom Washington

TNT

May 2
7:00 PM

Boxscore

Indiana Pacers 109, New Jersey Nets 120 (2OT)
Scoring by quarter: 24–27, 27–24, 28–28, 17–17, Overtime: 11–11, 2–13
Pts: Reggie Miller 31; Rebs: Brad Miller 17; Asts: Kevin Ollie 8	Pts: Jason Kidd 31; Rebs: Kidd, Martin 8 each Asts: Jason Kidd 7
New Jersey wins series, 3–2

Continental Airlines Arena, East Rutherford, New Jersey
Attendance: 20,049
Referees: Joe Crawford, Bob Delaney, Derrick Stafford

Regular-season series
New Jersey won 3–1 in the regular-season series

October 30, 2001

Recap

Indiana Pacers 97, New Jersey Nets 103

Continental Airlines Arena, East Rutherford, New Jersey

November 13, 2001

Recap

New Jersey Nets 91, Indiana Pacers 82

Conseco Fieldhouse, Indianapolis

December 21, 2001

Recap

New Jersey Nets 94, Indiana Pacers 100

Conseco Fieldhouse, Indianapolis

December 29, 2001

Recap

Indiana Pacers 93, New Jersey Nets 98 (OT)

Continental Airlines Arena, East Rutherford, New Jersey

This was the first NBA playoff meeting between the Pacers and the Nets. As members of the ABA, both teams met in the 1972 ABA Finals, where the Pacers won 4–2.

==== (2) Detroit Pistons vs. (7) Toronto Raptors ====
This series involved two teams that had exceeded expectations during the season. It was also the first time that professional sports teams from Detroit and Toronto met in a postseason series since the Detroit Red Wings and the Toronto Maple Leafs met in the 1993 Norris Division Semifinals, but no two teams from the two cities have met in a postseason series since. The Detroit Pistons were coming off a year where they had lost 50 games. The Raptors had lost their star forward, Vince Carter, for the remainder of the season. As a result, the Raptors lost 13 straight games without him. Although they looked down and out of playoff contention, the Raptors went on a surge, winning 12 of their last 14 games, locking up the 7th seed. The home team won each game of the series, with the Pistons winning the decisive Game 5 by 3 points. Raptors' Guard, Chris Childs, attempted to draw a foul on a three-point shot, instead of passing it to an open Dell Curry. In the post game interview, Childs stated that he thought the team was down by four points, not three. Detroit advanced to face the Boston Celtics in the second round. Meanwhile, Toronto, with a 39 year old Hakeem Olajuwon playing his final game, was on the couch.

TNT

April 21
8:30 PM

Boxscore

Toronto Raptors 63, Detroit Pistons 85
Scoring by quarter: 9–16, 25–26, 11–23, 18–20
Pts: Antonio Davis 15; Rebs: Antonio Davis 14; Asts: Alvin Williams 6	Pts: Jerry Stackhouse 20; Rebs: Ben Wallace 20; Asts: Jerry Stackhouse 4
Detroit leads series, 1–0

The Palace of Auburn Hills, Auburn Hills, Michigan
Attendance: 22,076
Referees: Scott Foster, Bennett Salvatore, Don Vaden

TNT

April 24
7:00 PM

Boxscore

Toronto Raptors 91, Detroit Pistons 96
Scoring by quarter: 30–27, 19–19, 18–26, 24–24
Pts: Chris Childs 22; Rebs: Antonio Davis 14; Asts: Chris Childs 14	Pts: Jerry Stackhouse 31; Rebs: Ben Wallace 15; Asts: three players 4 each
Detroit leads series, 2–0

The Palace of Auburn Hills, Auburn Hills, Michigan
Attendance: 22,076
Referees: Joe Crawford, Ken Mauer, Derrick Stafford

TNT

April 27
8:30 PM

Boxscore

Detroit Pistons 84, Toronto Raptors 94
Scoring by quarter: 17–26, 23–25, 27–28, 17–15
Pts: Chucky Atkins 21; Rebs: Ben Wallace 11; Asts: Jerry Stackhouse 4	Pts: Antonio Davis 30; Rebs: Antonio Davis 8 Asts: Chris Childs 10
Detroit leads series, 2–1

Air Canada Centre, Toronto, Ontario
Attendance: 20,138
Referees: Tony Brothers, Jim Clark, Jack Nies

TNT

April 29
7:30 PM

Boxscore

Detroit Pistons 83, Toronto Raptors 89
Scoring by quarter: 21–21, 15–25, 25–20, 22–23
Pts: Chucky Atkins 20; Rebs: Ben Wallace 12; Asts: Clifford Robinson 6	Pts: Morris Peterson 20; Rebs: Keon Clark 16; Asts: Alvin Williams 9
Series tied, 2–2

Air Canada Centre, Toronto, Ontario
Attendance: 20,112
Referees: Bernie Fryer, Ron Garretson, Mark Wunderlich

TBS

May 2
8:30 PM

Boxscore

Toronto Raptors 82, Detroit Pistons 85
Scoring by quarter: 26–21, 22–25, 11–17, 23–22
Pts: Dell Curry 17; Rebs: Antonio Davis 12; Asts: Childs, Williams 6 each	Pts: Corliss Williamson 23; Rebs: Ben Wallace 17; Asts: Jerry Stackhouse 7
Detroit wins series, 3–2

The Palace of Auburn Hills, Auburn Hills, Michigan
Attendance: 22,076
Referees: Joe DeRosa, Steve Javie, Eddie F. Rush

Game 5 is Hakeem Olajuwon's final NBA game.

Regular-season series
Detroit won 3–1 in the regular-season series

November 20, 2001

Recap

Detroit Pistons 88, Toronto Raptors 84

Air Canada Centre, Toronto, Ontario

January 15, 2002

Recap

Toronto Raptors 92, Detroit Pistons 90

The Palace of Auburn Hills, Auburn Hills, Michigan

February 18, 2002

Recap

Toronto Raptors 76, Detroit Pistons 89

The Palace of Auburn Hills, Auburn Hills, Michigan

February 22, 2002

Recap

Detroit Pistons 80, Toronto Raptors 72

Air Canada Centre, Toronto, Ontario

This was the first playoff meeting between the Pistons and the Raptors.

==== (3) Boston Celtics vs. (6) Philadelphia 76ers ====
This series marked the return of the Celtics to the playoffs for the first time in seven years, and they faced the reigning Eastern Conference champion in the first round. The first two games were played in Boston, where the Celtics won both games resoundingly. The 76ers fought back, however, and with Allen Iverson scoring 42 points the 76ers won Game 3 and stayed alive. In Game 4, Iverson was slowed down, scoring 26 points on just 9-of-26 shooting, and Antoine Walker stepped up for the Celtics, scoring 25. But Iverson's play at the end making a layup, scoring off an Eric Snow steal, and hitting some free throws after Walker drilled a three sealed the victory for the 76ers. This set the stage for a Game 5 in Boston to decide the series. The Celtics had control on this game throughout, but the 76ers kept within striking distance into the 4th quarter. But Boston went on an amazing streak of three-pointers, hitting an NBA playoff record nine of them in the 4th quarter and 19 in the game. Paul Pierce led the way with 46, on 8-10 shooting from downtown, and Boston won in a huge blowout, sending them to the conference semifinals to face second-seed Detroit.

NBC

April 21
12:30 PM

Boxscore

Philadelphia 76ers 82, Boston Celtics 92
Scoring by quarter: 28–31, 20–23, 11–19, 23–19
Pts: Allen Iverson 20; Rebs: Dikembe Mutombo 11; Asts: Eric Snow 5	Pts: Paul Pierce 31; Rebs: Paul Pierce 11; Asts: Kenny Anderson 5
Boston leads series, 1–0

FleetCenter, Boston, Massachusetts
Attendance: 18,624
Referees: Sean Corbin, Steve Javie, Tom Washington

TNT

April 25
8:00 PM

Boxscore

Philadelphia 76ers 85, Boston Celtics 93
Scoring by quarter: 21–26, 19–22, 21–21, 24–24
Pts: Allen Iverson 29; Rebs: Derrick Coleman 13; Asts: Allen Iverson 7	Pts: Paul Pierce 25; Rebs: Pierce, Walker 10 each Asts: three players 4 each
Boston leads series, 2–0

FleetCenter, Boston, Massachusetts
Attendance: 18,624
Referees: Bob Delaney, Jack Nies, Ron Olesiak

NBC

April 28
12:30 PM

Boxscore

Boston Celtics 103, Philadelphia 76ers 108
Scoring by quarter: 21–30, 31–28, 29–25, 22–25
Pts: Paul Pierce 29; Rebs: Rodney Rogers 11; Asts: Paul Pierce 7	Pts: Allen Iverson 42; Rebs: Dikembe Mutombo 11; Asts: Eric Snow 5
Boston leads series, 2–1

First Union Center, Philadelphia, Pennsylvania
Attendance: 20,689
Referees: Joe Crawford, Hue Hollins, Ken Mauer

TNT

May 1
8:00 PM

Boxscore

Boston Celtics 81, Philadelphia 76ers 83
Scoring by quarter: 20–16, 16–22, 25–18, 20–27
Pts: Antoine Walker 25; Rebs: Paul Pierce 8 Asts: Kenny Anderson 8	Pts: Allen Iverson 28; Rebs: Dikembe Mutombo 14; Asts: Eric Snow 11
Series tied, 2–2

First Union Center, Philadelphia, Pennsylvania
Attendance: 20,904
Referees: Dick Bavetta, Mike Callahan, Ron Garretson

TNT

May 3
7:00 PM

Boxscore

Philadelphia 76ers 87, Boston Celtics 120
Scoring by quarter: 22–27, 25–32, 20–18, 20–43
Pts: Allen Iverson 31; Rebs: Matt Harpring 8 Asts: Iverson, McKie 4 each	Pts: Paul Pierce 46; Rebs: Antoine Walker 9 Asts: Pierce, Walker 6 each
Boston wins series, 3–2

FleetCenter, Boston, Massachusetts
Attendance: 18,624
Referees: Ted Bernhardt, Dan Crawford, Greg Willard

Regular-season series
Philadelphia won 3–1 in the regular-season series

December 17, 2001

Recap

Boston Celtics 83, Philadelphia 76ers 99

First Union Center, Philadelphia

January 25, 2002

Recap

Philadelphia 76ers 106, Boston Celtics 90

FleetCenter, Boston

March 4, 2002

Recap

Boston Celtics 100, Philadelphia 76ers 94

First Union Center, Philadelphia

March 22, 2002

Recap

Philadelphia 76ers 96, Boston Celtics 91

FleetCenter, Boston

This was the 19th playoff meeting between these two teams, with the Celtics winning 10 of the first 18 meetings.

Previous playoff series
Boston leads 10–8 in all-time playoff series

1953

Boston Celtics 2, Syracuse Nationals 0

1953 Eastern Division Semifinals

1954

Boston Celtics 0, Syracuse Nationals 2

1954 Eastern Division Round Robin Semifinals

1954

Boston Celtics 0, Syracuse Nationals 2

1954 Eastern Division Finals

1955

Boston Celtics 1, Syracuse Nationals 3

1955 Eastern Division Finals

1956

Boston Celtics 1, Syracuse Nationals 2

1956 Eastern Division Semifinals

1957

Boston Celtics 3, Syracuse Nationals 0

1957 Eastern Division Finals

1959

Boston Celtics 4, Syracuse Nationals 3

1959 Eastern Division Finals

1961

Boston Celtics 4, Syracuse Nationals 1

1961 Eastern Division Finals

1965

Boston Celtics 4, Philadelphia 76ers 3

1965 Eastern Division Finals

1966

Boston Celtics 4, Philadelphia 76ers 1

1966 Eastern Division Finals

1967

Boston Celtics 1, Philadelphia 76ers 4

1967 Eastern Division Finals

1968

Boston Celtics 4, Philadelphia 76ers 3

1968 Eastern Division Finals

1969

Boston Celtics 4, Philadelphia 76ers 1

1969 Eastern Division Semifinals

1977

Boston Celtics 3, Philadelphia 76ers 4

1977 Eastern Conference Semifinals

1980

Boston Celtics 1, Philadelphia 76ers 4

1980 Eastern Conference Finals

1981

Boston Celtics 4, Philadelphia 76ers 3

1981 Eastern Conference Finals

1982

Boston Celtics 3, Philadelphia 76ers 4

1982 Eastern Conference Finals

1985

Boston Celtics 4, Philadelphia 76ers 1

1985 Eastern Conference Finals

==== (4) Charlotte Hornets vs. (5) Orlando Magic ====
TNT

April 20
8:30 PM

Boxscore

Orlando Magic 79, Charlotte Hornets 80
Scoring by quarter: 28–20, 16–19, 24–18, 11–23
Pts: Tracy McGrady 20; Rebs: Horace Grant 10; Asts: Tracy McGrady 6	Pts: Baron Davis 28; Rebs: P. J. Brown 15; Asts: Baron Davis 7
Charlotte leads series, 1–0

Charlotte Coliseum, Charlotte, North Carolina
Attendance: 9,505
Referees: Joe DeRosa, Eddie F. Rush, Mark Wunderlich

TBS

April 23
8:00 PM

Boxscore

Orlando Magic 111, Charlotte Hornets 103 (OT)
Scoring by quarter: 27–26, 35–21, 15–28, 22–24, Overtime: 12–4
Pts: Tracy McGrady 31; Rebs: Tracy McGrady 11; Asts: Tracy McGrady 7	Pts: Elden Campbell 27; Rebs: Elden Campbell 13; Asts: Baron Davis 10
Series tied, 1–1

Charlotte Coliseum, Charlotte, North Carolina
Attendance: 10,323
Referees: Nolan Fine, Joe Forte, Steve Javie

NBC

April 27
12:30 PM

Boxscore

Charlotte Hornets 110, Orlando Magic 100 (OT)
Scoring by quarter: 27–27, 23–18, 16–24, 26–23, Overtime: 18–8
Pts: Baron Davis 33; Rebs: Baron Davis 14; Asts: Baron Davis 10	Pts: Tracy McGrady 37; Rebs: Garrity, Grant 10 each Asts: Darrell Armstrong 8
Charlotte leads series, 2–1

TD Waterhouse Centre, Orlando, Florida
Attendance: 16,754
Referees: Bernie Fryer, Luis Grillo, Derrick Stafford

TBS

April 30
7:00 PM

Boxscore

Charlotte Hornets 102, Orlando Magic 85
Scoring by quarter: 25–24, 26–17, 24–28, 27–16
Pts: Baron Davis 28; Rebs: Baron Davis 11; Asts: Baron Davis 10	Pts: Tracy McGrady 35; Rebs: Patrick Ewing 10; Asts: Tracy McGrady 6
Charlotte wins series, 3–1

TD Waterhouse Centre, Orlando, Florida
Attendance: 16,254
Referees: Joe Crawford, Bob Delaney, Hue Hollins

Game 4 is Patrick Ewing's final NBA game.

Regular-season series
Charlotte won 3–1 in the regular-season series

November 23, 2001

Recap

Orlando Magic 109, Charlotte Hornets 99

Charlotte Coliseum, Charlotte, North Carolina

November 24, 2001

Recap

Charlotte Hornets 103, Orlando Magic 101

TD Waterhouse Centre, Orlando, Florida

March 22, 2002

Recap

Charlotte Hornets 106, Orlando Magic 92

TD Waterhouse Centre, Orlando, Florida

March 27, 2002

Recap

Orlando Magic 104, Charlotte Hornets 111

Charlotte Coliseum, Charlotte, North Carolina

This was the first playoff meeting between the Magic and the Charlotte Hornets/Bobcats franchise.

=== Western Conference first round ===
==== (1) Sacramento Kings vs. (8) Utah Jazz ====
NBC

April 20
3:00 PM

Boxscore

Utah Jazz 86, Sacramento Kings 89
Scoring by quarter: 20–25, 27–21, 17–25, 22–18
Pts: Karl Malone 25; Rebs: Donyell Marshall 10; Asts: John Stockton 12	Pts: Chris Webber 24; Rebs: Chris Webber 12; Asts: Chris Webber 7
Sacramento leads series, 1–0

ARCO Arena, Sacramento, California
Attendance: 17,317
Referees: Bernie Fryer, Ron Garretson, Blane Reichelt

TBS

April 23
10:30 PM

Boxscore

Utah Jazz 93, Sacramento Kings 86
Scoring by quarter: 15–14, 29–15, 20–23, 29–34
Pts: Donyell Marshall 19; Rebs: Karl Malone 12; Asts: John Stockton 12	Pts: Vlade Divac 21; Rebs: Chris Webber 9 Asts: Doug Christie 5
Series tied, 1–1

ARCO Arena, Sacramento, California
Attendance: 17,317
Referees: Dick Bavetta, Mike Callahan, Monty McCutchen

NBC

April 27
3:00 PM

Boxscore

Sacramento Kings 90, Utah Jazz 87
Scoring by quarter: 32–21, 14–24, 23–21, 21–21
Pts: Mike Bibby 26; Rebs: Chris Webber 13; Asts: Mike Bibby 5	Pts: Karl Malone 23; Rebs: Malone, Russell 6 each Asts: Malone, Stockton 7 each
Sacramento leads series, 2–1

Delta Center, Salt Lake City, Utah
Attendance: 19,911
Referees: David Jones, Eddie F. Rush, Greg Willard

TNT

April 29
10:00 PM

Boxscore

Sacramento Kings 91, Utah Jazz 86
Scoring by quarter: 28–20, 18–20, 21–22, 24–24
Pts: Peja Stojaković 30; Rebs: Chris Webber 9 Asts: Doug Christie 9	Pts: Karl Malone 14; Rebs: Greg Ostertag 15; Asts: John Stockton 9
Sacramento wins series, 3–1

Delta Center, Salt Lake City, Utah
Attendance: 19,911
Referees: Ted Bernhardt, Dan Crawford, Don Vaden

Regular-season series
Sacramento won 4–0 in the regular-season series

January 24, 2002

Recap

Utah Jazz 80, Sacramento Kings 113

ARCO Arena, Sacramento, California

January 26, 2002

Recap

Sacramento Kings 114, Utah Jazz 90

Delta Center, Salt Lake City

February 26, 2002

Recap

Utah Jazz 81, Sacramento Kings 107

ARCO Arena, Sacramento, California

April 5, 2002

Recap

Sacramento Kings 117, Utah Jazz 109

Delta Center, Salt Lake City

This was the second playoff meeting between these two teams, with the Jazz winning the first meeting.

Previous playoff series
Utah leads 1–0 in all-time playoff series

1999

Sacramento Kings 2, Utah Jazz 3

1999 Western Conference First Round

==== (2) San Antonio Spurs vs. (7) Seattle SuperSonics ====
NBC

April 20
5:30 PM

Boxscore

Seattle SuperSonics 89, San Antonio Spurs 110
Scoring by quarter: 29–24, 23–28, 13–38, 24–20
Pts: Vin Baker 22; Rebs: Vin Baker 7 Asts: four players 2 each	Pts: Duncan, Parker 21 each Rebs: Tim Duncan 10; Asts: Tim Duncan 11
San Antonio leads series, 1–0

Alamodome, San Antonio, Texas
Attendance: 23,634
Referees: Jim Clark, Bob Delaney, Jack Nies

TNT

April 22
9:30 PM

Boxscore

Seattle SuperSonics 98, San Antonio Spurs 90
Scoring by quarter: 22–36, 30–18, 21–17, 25–19
Pts: Gary Payton 21; Rebs: Gary Payton 11; Asts: Gary Payton 5	Pts: Tim Duncan 32; Rebs: Tim Duncan 12; Asts: Tim Duncan 3
Series tied, 1–1

Alamodome, San Antonio, Texas
Attendance: 23,059
Referees: Bernie Fryer, Ron Garretson, Luis Grillo

NBC

April 27
5:30 PM

Boxscore

San Antonio Spurs 102, Seattle SuperSonics 75
Scoring by quarter: 23–21, 34–18, 22–15, 23–21
Pts: Tim Duncan 27; Rebs: Tim Duncan 13; Asts: Tim Duncan 5	Pts: Gary Payton 20; Rebs: Brent Barry 8 Asts: Gary Payton 6
San Antonio leads series, 2–1

KeyArena, Seattle, Washington
Attendance: 17,072
Referees: Ted Bernhardt, James Capers, Dan Crawford

TNT

May 1
10:30 PM

Boxscore

San Antonio Spurs 79, Seattle SuperSonics 91
Scoring by quarter: 13–24, 18–33, 28–19, 20–15
Pts: Malik Rose 28; Rebs: Malik Rose 13; Asts: Porter, Rose 3 each	Pts: Gary Payton 28; Rebs: Gary Payton 12; Asts: Gary Payton 11
Series tied, 2–2

KeyArena, Seattle, Washington
Attendance: 17,072
Referees: Bennett Salvatore, Bill Spooner, Don Vaden

TNT

May 3
9:30 PM

Boxscore

Seattle SuperSonics 78, San Antonio Spurs 101
Scoring by quarter: 10–27, 16–28, 32–26, 20–20
Pts: Gary Payton 23; Rebs: Gary Payton 9 Asts: Gary Payton 5	Pts: Tim Duncan 23; Rebs: Malik Rose 13; Asts: Steve Smith 6
San Antonio wins series, 3–2

Alamodome, San Antonio, Texas
Attendance: 23,369
Referees: Dick Bavetta, Mike Callahan, Tom Washington

Regular-season series
Tied 2–2 in the regular-season series

November 1, 2001

Recap

San Antonio Spurs 108, Seattle SuperSonics 114

KeyArena, Seattle

November 21, 2001

Recap

Seattle SuperSonics 93, San Antonio Spurs 110

Alamodome, San Antonio

March 29, 2002

Recap

San Antonio Spurs 76, Seattle SuperSonics 79

KeyArena, Seattle

April 3, 2002

Recap

Seattle SuperSonics 88, San Antonio Spurs 90

Alamodome, San Antonio

This was the second playoff meeting between these two teams, with the Spurs winning the first meeting.

Previous playoff series
San Antonio leads 1–0 in all-time playoff series

1982

San Antonio Spurs 4, Seattle SuperSonics 1

1982 Western Conference Semifinals

==== (3) Los Angeles Lakers vs. (6) Portland Trail Blazers ====
NBC

April 21
5:30 PM

Boxscore

Portland Trail Blazers 87, Los Angeles Lakers 95
Scoring by quarter: 23–19, 21–27, 18–22, 25–27
Pts: Rasheed Wallace 25; Rebs: Rasheed Wallace 14; Asts: Bonzi Wells 6	Pts: Kobe Bryant 34; Rebs: Shaquille O'Neal 9 Asts: Rick Fox 6
LA Lakers lead series, 1–0

Staples Center, Los Angeles, California
Attendance: 18,997
Referees: Dick Bavetta, Mike Callahan, Monty McCutchen

TNT

April 25
10:30 PM

Boxscore

Portland Trail Blazers 96, Los Angeles Lakers 103
Scoring by quarter: 18–27, 19–24, 26–26, 33–26
Pts: Rasheed Wallace 31; Rebs: Rasheed Wallace 11; Asts: Damon Stoudamire 5	Pts: Shaquille O'Neal 31; Rebs: Shaquille O'Neal 14; Asts: Kobe Bryant 5
LA Lakers lead series, 2–0

Staples Center, Los Angeles, California
Attendance: 18,997
Referees: James Capers, Dan Crawford, Greg Willard

NBC

April 28
5:30 PM

Boxscore

Los Angeles Lakers 92, Portland Trail Blazers 91
Scoring by quarter: 19–19, 31–22, 17–26, 25–24
Pts: Kobe Bryant 25; Rebs: Shaquille O'Neal 11; Asts: Bryant, O'Neal 7 each	Pts: Rasheed Wallace 20; Rebs: Rasheed Wallace 12; Asts: Scottie Pippen 8
LA Lakers win series, 3–0

Rose Garden Arena, Portland, Oregon
Attendance: 20,580
Referees: Tim Donaghy, Steve Javie, Tom Washington

The Lakers sweep the Blazers thanks to a series-winning 3 by Robert Horry with 2.1 seconds left in Game 3.

Regular-season series
Tied 2–2 in the regular-season series

October 30, 2001

Recap

Portland Trail Blazers 87, Los Angeles Lakers 98

Staples Center, Los Angeles

February 17, 2002

Recap

Los Angeles Lakers 105, Portland Trail Blazers 111

Rose Garden Arena, Portland, Oregon

March 29, 2002

Recap

Portland Trail Blazers 79, Los Angeles Lakers 91

Staples Center, Los Angeles

April 14, 2002

Recap

Los Angeles Lakers 120, Portland Trail Blazers 128 (2OT)

Rose Garden Arena, Portland, Oregon

This was the 11th playoff meeting between these two teams, with the Lakers winning eight of the first ten meetings.

Previous playoff series
Los Angeles leads 8–2 in all-time playoff series

1977

Los Angeles Lakers 0, Portland Trail Blazers 4

1977 Western Conference Finals

1983

Los Angeles Lakers 4, Portland Trail Blazers 1

1983 Western Conference Semifinals

1985

Los Angeles Lakers 4, Portland Trail Blazers 1

1985 Western Conference Semifinals

1989

Los Angeles Lakers 3, Portland Trail Blazers 0

1989 Western Conference First Round

1991

Los Angeles Lakers 4, Portland Trail Blazers 2

1991 Western Conference Finals

1992

Los Angeles Lakers 1, Portland Trail Blazers 3

1992 Western Conference First Round

1997

Los Angeles Lakers 3, Portland Trail Blazers 1

1997 Western Conference First Round

1998

Los Angeles Lakers 3, Portland Trail Blazers 1

1998 Western Conference First Round

2000

Los Angeles Lakers 4, Portland Trail Blazers 3

2000 Western Conference Finals

2001

Los Angeles Lakers 3, Portland Trail Blazers 0

2001 Western Conference First Round

- This is the most recent playoff series between the Lakers & Trail Blazers until 2020.

==== (4) Dallas Mavericks vs. (5) Minnesota Timberwolves ====
Dirk Nowitzki was virtually unstoppable in this series, averaging 33 points and 16 rebounds per game.

NBC

April 21
3:00 PM

Boxscore

Minnesota Timberwolves 94, Dallas Mavericks 101
Scoring by quarter: 31–22, 16–28, 26–23, 21–28
Pts: Chauncey Billups 25; Rebs: Kevin Garnett 21; Asts: Chauncey Billups 9	Pts: Dirk Nowitzki 30; Rebs: Dirk Nowitzki 15; Asts: Nick Van Exel 7
Dallas leads series, 1–0

American Airlines Center, Dallas, Texas
Attendance: 20,010
Referees: Ted Bernhardt, Joe Crawford, Hue Hollins

TNT

April 24
9:30 PM

Boxscore

Minnesota Timberwolves 110, Dallas Mavericks 122
Scoring by quarter: 28–33, 31–30, 28–34, 23–25
Pts: Kevin Garnett 31; Rebs: Kevin Garnett 18; Asts: Billups, Garnett 4 each	Pts: Dirk Nowitzki 31; Rebs: Dirk Nowitzki 15; Asts: Steve Nash 10
Dallas leads series, 2–0

American Airlines Center, Dallas, Texas
Attendance: 20,084
Referees: Scott Foster, Bennett Salvatore, Don Vaden

NBC

April 28
3:00 PM

Boxscore

Dallas Mavericks 115, Minnesota Timberwolves 102
Scoring by quarter: 40–28, 27–29, 30–22, 18–23
Pts: Dirk Nowitzki 39; Rebs: Dirk Nowitzki 17; Asts: Steve Nash 11	Pts: Kevin Garnett 22; Rebs: Kevin Garnett 17; Asts: Kevin Garnett 5
Dallas wins series, 3–0

Target Center, Minneapolis, Minnesota
Attendance: 18,795
Referees: Dick Bavetta, Jess Kersey, Bill Spooner

Regular-season series
Tied 2–2 in the regular-season series

December 15, 2001

Recap

Minnesota Timberwolves 117, Dallas Mavericks 125

American Airlines Center, Dallas

December 18, 2001

Recap

Dallas Mavericks 107, Minnesota Timberwolves 103

Target Center, Minneapolis

February 19, 2002

Recap

Minnesota Timberwolves 117, Dallas Mavericks 100

American Airlines Center, Dallas

March 28, 2002

Recap

Dallas Mavericks 111, Minnesota Timberwolves 113

Target Center, Minneapolis

This was the first playoff meeting between the Mavericks and the Timberwolves.

== Conference semifinals ==
=== Eastern Conference semifinals ===
==== (1) New Jersey Nets vs. (4) Charlotte Hornets ====
NBC

May 5
12:30 PM

Boxscore

Charlotte Hornets 93, New Jersey Nets 99
Scoring by quarter: 22–26, 29–19, 22–32, 20–22
Pts: Baron Davis 23; Rebs: P. J. Brown 9 Asts: David Wesley 8	Pts: Jason Kidd 21; Rebs: Jason Kidd 7 Asts: Jason Kidd 7
New Jersey leads series, 1–0

Continental Airlines Arena, East Rutherford, New Jersey
Attendance: 19,071
Referees: Joe DeRosa, Eddie F. Rush, Greg Willard

TBS

May 7
8:00 PM

Boxscore

Charlotte Hornets 88, New Jersey Nets 102
Scoring by quarter: 19–24, 31–29, 22–27, 16–22
Pts: Baron Davis 21; Rebs: George Lynch 11; Asts: Baron Davis 7	Pts: Lucious Harris 24; Rebs: Keith Van Horn 11; Asts: Jason Kidd 6
New Jersey leads series, 2–0

Continental Airlines Arena, East Rutherford, New Jersey
Attendance: 20,049
Referees: Monty McCutchen, Bennett Salvatore, Don Vaden

TNT

May 9
7:00 PM

Boxscore

New Jersey Nets 97, Charlotte Hornets 115
Scoring by quarter: 18–28, 27–23, 24–33, 28–31
Pts: Richard Jefferson 16; Rebs: Collins, Kidd 7 each Asts: Jason Kidd 6	Pts: Baron Davis 26; Rebs: George Lynch 12; Asts: Baron Davis 8
New Jersey leads series, 2–1

Charlotte Coliseum, Charlotte, North Carolina
Attendance: 11,363
Referees: Dick Bavetta, Mike Callahan, Tom Washington

NBC

May 12
12:30 PM

Boxscore

New Jersey Nets 89, Charlotte Hornets 79
Scoring by quarter: 25–24, 14–20, 25–20, 25–15
Pts: Jason Kidd 24; Rebs: Kidd, Van Horn 11 each Asts: Jason Kidd 8	Pts: Baron Davis 20; Rebs: P. J. Brown 16; Asts: Baron Davis 6
New Jersey leads series, 3–1

Charlotte Coliseum, Charlotte, North Carolina
Attendance: 13,864
Referees: Joe Crawford, Bob Delaney, Bill Spooner

NBC

May 15
8:00 PM

Boxscore

Charlotte Hornets 95, New Jersey Nets 103
Scoring by quarter: 24–25, 26–23, 22–27, 23–28
Pts: Magloire, Nailon 14 each Rebs: George Lynch 13; Asts: Baron Davis 8	Pts: Jason Kidd 23; Rebs: Kenyon Martin 8 Asts: Jason Kidd 13
New Jersey wins series, 4–1

Continental Airlines Arena, East Rutherford, New Jersey
Attendance: 20,049
Referees: Bernie Fryer, Hue Hollins, Mark Wunderlich

- Game 4 would not only be the last game played at Charlotte Coliseum until 2004 when the Charlotte Bobcats were an expansion team (the Bobcats would make the first of their two only playoff appearances in 2010), but the last playoff game ever played at the arena. Game 5 would also be the Hornets' last playoff game before moving to New Orleans and then being renewed in 2014. They would make the playoffs again in 2016.

Regular-season series
New Jersey won 3–1 in the regular-season series

November 3, 2001

Recap

Charlotte Hornets 85, New Jersey Nets 95

Continental Airlines Arena, East Rutherford, New Jersey

January 5, 2002

Recap

New Jersey Nets 89, Charlotte Hornets 80

Charlotte Coliseum, Charlotte, North Carolina

February 24, 2002

Recap

Charlotte Hornets 93, New Jersey Nets 95

Continental Airlines Arena, East Rutherford, New Jersey

February 27, 2002

Recap

New Jersey Nets 85, Charlotte Hornets 104

Charlotte Coliseum, Charlotte, North Carolina

This was the first playoff meeting between the Nets and the Hornets.

==== (2) Detroit Pistons vs. (3) Boston Celtics ====
NBC

May 5
3:00 PM

Boxscore

Boston Celtics 84, Detroit Pistons 96
Scoring by quarter: 22–22, 21–28, 19–28, 22–18
Pts: Antoine Walker 20; Rebs: Paul Pierce 10; Asts: Paul Pierce 5	Pts: Clifford Robinson 30; Rebs: Ben Wallace 12; Asts: Atkins, Stackhouse 8 each
Detroit leads series, 1–0

The Palace of Auburn Hills, Auburn Hills, Michigan
Attendance: 20,252
Referees: Jim Clark, Joe Crawford, Joe Forte

TNT

May 8
8:00 PM

Boxscore

Boston Celtics 85, Detroit Pistons 77
Scoring by quarter: 28–20, 22–16, 17–23, 18–18
Pts: Paul Pierce 22; Rebs: Tony Battie 11; Asts: Kenny Anderson 5	Pts: Jerry Stackhouse 25; Rebs: Ben Wallace 16; Asts: Chucky Atkins 4
Series tied, 1–1

The Palace of Auburn Hills, Auburn Hills, Michigan
Attendance: 22,076
Referees: Bernie Fryer, Jack Nies, Mark Wunderlich

TNT

May 10
7:00 PM

Boxscore

Detroit Pistons 64, Boston Celtics 66
Scoring by quarter: 17–17, 16–20, 15–11, 16–18
Pts: Jerry Stackhouse 19; Rebs: Ben Wallace 21; Asts: Clifford Robinson 5	Pts: Paul Pierce 19; Rebs: Tony Battie 10; Asts: Paul Pierce 5
Boston leads series, 2–1

FleetCenter, Boston, Massachusetts
Attendance: 18,624
Referees: Dan Crawford, Joe DeRosa, Scott Foster

NBC

May 12
3:00 PM

Boxscore

Detroit Pistons 79, Boston Celtics 90
Scoring by quarter: 17–21, 22–20, 19–25, 21–24
Pts: Clifford Robinson 24; Rebs: Ben Wallace 21; Asts: Damon Jones 9	Pts: Antoine Walker 30; Rebs: Paul Pierce 17; Asts: Paul Pierce 6
Boston leads series, 3–1

FleetCenter, Boston, Massachusetts
Attendance: 18,624
Referees: Luis Grillo, Steve Javie, Tom Washington

TBS

May 14
8:00 PM

Boxscore

Boston Celtics 90, Detroit Pistons 81
Scoring by quarter: 24–21, 20–24, 20–10, 26–26
Pts: Paul Pierce 18; Rebs: Antoine Walker 13; Asts: Kenny Anderson 6	Pts: Chucky Atkins 22; Rebs: Ben Wallace 16; Asts: Robinson, Stackhouse 5 each
Boston wins series, 4–1

The Palace of Auburn Hills, Auburn Hills, Michigan
Attendance: 22,076
Referees: Bennett Salvatore, Bill Spooner, Don Vaden

Regular-season series
Tied 2–2 in the regular-season series

January 11, 2002

Recap

Detroit Pistons 90, Boston Celtics 104

FleetCenter, Boston

January 19, 2002

Recap

Boston Celtics 91, Detroit Pistons 94

The Palace of Auburn Hills, Auburn Hills, Michigan

March 8, 2002

Recap

Detroit Pistons 92, Boston Celtics 117

FleetCenter, Boston

March 24, 2002

Recap

Boston Celtics 101, Detroit Pistons 109

The Palace of Auburn Hills, Auburn Hills, Michigan

This was the seventh playoff meeting in the history of the Pistons-Celtics rivalry, with each team winning three series apiece.

Previous playoff series
Tied 3–3 in all-time playoff series

1968

Boston Celtics 4, Detroit Pistons 2

1968 Eastern Division Semifinals

1985

Boston Celtics 4, Detroit Pistons 2

1985 Eastern Conference Semifinals

1987

Boston Celtics 4, Detroit Pistons 3

1987 Eastern Conference Finals

1988

Boston Celtics 2, Detroit Pistons 4

1988 Eastern Conference Finals

1989

Boston Celtics 0, Detroit Pistons 3

1989 Eastern Conference First Round

1991

Boston Celtics 2, Detroit Pistons 4

1991 Eastern Conference Semifinals

=== Western Conference semifinals ===
==== (1) Sacramento Kings vs. (4) Dallas Mavericks ====
NBC

May 4
6:30 PM

Boxscore

Dallas Mavericks 91, Sacramento Kings 108
Scoring by quarter: 24–27, 26–28, 24–27, 17–26
Pts: Dirk Nowitzki 23; Rebs: Dirk Nowitzki 14; Asts: Steve Nash 5	Pts: Peja Stojaković 26; Rebs: Vlade Divac 16; Asts: Bibby, Christie 8 each
Sacramento leads series, 1–0

ARCO Arena, Sacramento, California
Attendance: 17,317
Referees: Scott Foster, Ken Mauer, Bennett Salvatore

TNT

May 6
9:00 PM

Boxscore

Dallas Mavericks 110, Sacramento Kings 102
Scoring by quarter: 23–36, 36–24, 22–20, 29–22
Pts: Steve Nash 30; Rebs: Dirk Nowitzki 15; Asts: Steve Nash 8	Pts: Bibby, Webber 22 each Rebs: Stojaković, Webber 12 each Asts: Mike Bibby 7
Series tied, 1–1

ARCO Arena, Sacramento, California
Attendance: 17,317
Referees: Ron Garretson, Hue Hollins, Steve Javie

TNT

May 9
9:30 PM

Boxscore

Sacramento Kings 125, Dallas Mavericks 119
Scoring by quarter: 38–25, 28–41, 25–25, 34–28
Pts: Chris Webber 31; Rebs: Chris Webber 15; Asts: Mike Bibby 9	Pts: Michael Finley 37; Rebs: Raef LaFrentz 13; Asts: Steve Nash 15
Sacramento leads series, 2–1

American Airlines Center, Dallas, Texas
Attendance: 20,265
Referees: Joe Crawford, Bob Delaney, Derrick Stafford

NBC

May 11
3:30 PM

Boxscore

Sacramento Kings 115, Dallas Mavericks 113 (OT)
Scoring by quarter: 25–27, 26–27, 31–35, 27–20, Overtime: 6–4
Pts: Chris Webber 30; Rebs: Vlade Divac 14; Asts: Bobby Jackson 5	Pts: Dirk Nowitzki 31; Rebs: Dirk Nowitzki 12; Asts: Dirk Nowitzki 7
Sacramento leads series, 3–1

American Airlines Center, Dallas, Texas
Attendance: 20,274
Referees: Jim Clark, Bernie Fryer, Greg Willard

TNT

May 13
9:00 PM

Boxscore

Dallas Mavericks 101, Sacramento Kings 114
Scoring by quarter: 26–32, 27–27, 20–27, 28–28
Pts: Dirk Nowitzki 32; Rebs: Dirk Nowitzki 12; Asts: Steve Nash 9	Pts: Bibby, Webber 23 each Rebs: Hedo Türkoğlu 13; Asts: Doug Christie 7
Sacramento wins series, 4–1

ARCO Arena, Sacramento, California
Attendance: 17,317
Referees: Ted Bernhardt, Dan Crawford, Joe Forte

Regular-season series
Dallas won 3–1 in the regular-season series

November 29, 2001

Recap

Sacramento Kings 110, Dallas Mavericks 98

American Airlines Center, Dallas

December 2, 2001

Recap

Dallas Mavericks 120, Sacramento Kings 114 (OT)

ARCO Arena, Sacramento, California

February 23, 2002

Recap

Sacramento Kings 97, Dallas Mavericks 111

American Airlines Center, Dallas

April 14, 2002

Recap

Dallas Mavericks 113, Sacramento Kings 100

ARCO Arena, Sacramento, California

This was the first playoff meeting between the Mavericks and the Kings.

==== (2) San Antonio Spurs vs. (3) Los Angeles Lakers ====
The Spurs led going into the fourth quarter of four out of the five games, yet were able to win only one. Bryant would pace Los Angeles to 2 crucial victories in the Alamodome with 31 points in Game 3 and a game-winning bucket in Game 4, and would offset the steady production of Tim Duncan (who had a double double in every game including 34 points and 25 rebounds in Game 5) with his fourth quarter heroics. It would be San Antonio's final 2 home games in the Alamodome, as they would move into the SBC Center (now the Frost Bank Center) the following year. Coincidentally, the roles were reversed in 1999 when the Spurs defeated the Lakers In Game 4 in what was the last game at the Great Western Forum.

NBC

May 5
5:30 PM

Boxscore

San Antonio Spurs 80, Los Angeles Lakers 86
Scoring by quarter: 17–13, 21–19, 23–25, 19–29
Pts: Tim Duncan 26; Rebs: Tim Duncan 21; Asts: Tim Duncan 5	Pts: Shaquille O'Neal 23; Rebs: Shaquille O'Neal 17; Asts: three players 4 each
LA Lakers lead series, 1–0

Staples Center, Los Angeles, California
Attendance: 18,997
Referees: Bernie Fryer, Luis Grillo, Jack Nies

TBS

May 7
10:30 PM

Boxscore

San Antonio Spurs 88, Los Angeles Lakers 85
Scoring by quarter: 31–26, 25–14, 17–25, 15–20
Pts: Tim Duncan 27; Rebs: Tim Duncan 17; Asts: Tony Parker 9	Pts: Kobe Bryant 26; Rebs: Robert Horry 11; Asts: Kobe Bryant 6
Series tied, 1–1

Staples Center, Los Angeles, California
Attendance: 18,997
Referees: Ted Bernhardt, Dan Crawford, Bill Spooner

TNT

May 10
9:30 PM

Boxscore

Los Angeles Lakers 99, San Antonio Spurs 89
Scoring by quarter: 24–28, 29–24, 21–19, 25–18
Pts: Kobe Bryant 31; Rebs: Shaquille O'Neal 15; Asts: Kobe Bryant 6	Pts: Tim Duncan 28; Rebs: Tim Duncan 12; Asts: Tony Parker 5
LA Lakers lead series, 2–1

Alamodome, San Antonio, Texas
Attendance: 35,520
Referees: Ken Mauer, Eddie F. Rush, Bennett Salvatore

NBC

May 12
5:30 PM

Boxscore

Los Angeles Lakers 87, San Antonio Spurs 85
Scoring by quarter: 25–25, 17–21, 25–29, 20–10
Pts: Kobe Bryant 28; Rebs: Shaquille O'Neal 11; Asts: Shaquille O'Neal 5	Pts: Tim Duncan 30; Rebs: Duncan, Robinson 11 each Asts: Tim Duncan 6
LA Lakers lead series, 3–1

Alamodome, San Antonio, Texas
Attendance: 32,342
Referees: Dick Bavetta, Mike Callahan, Monty McCutchen

TBS

May 14
10:30 PM

Boxscore

San Antonio Spurs 87, Los Angeles Lakers 93
Scoring by quarter: 22–15, 23–24, 16–23, 26–31
Pts: Tim Duncan 34; Rebs: Tim Duncan 25; Asts: Tony Parker 6	Pts: Kobe Bryant 26; Rebs: Shaquille O'Neal 11; Asts: Rick Fox 7
LA Lakers win series, 4–1

Staples Center, Los Angeles, California
Attendance: 18,997
Referees: Ron Garretson, Steve Javie, Derrick Stafford

Regular-season series
Los Angeles won 3–1 in the regular-season series

January 19, 2002

Recap

Los Angeles Lakers 98, San Antonio Spurs 81

Alamodome, San Antonio

January 25, 2002

Recap

San Antonio Spurs 91, Los Angeles Lakers 94

Staples Center, Los Angeles

March 20, 2002

Recap

Los Angeles Lakers 90, San Antonio Spurs 108

Alamodome, San Antonio

March 31, 2002

Recap

San Antonio Spurs 95, Los Angeles Lakers 96

Staples Center, Los Angeles

This was the eighth playoff meeting in the history of the Lakers-Spurs rivalry, with the Lakers winning five of the first seven meetings.

Previous playoff series
Los Angeles leads 5–2 in all-time playoff series

1982

Los Angeles Lakers 4, San Antonio Spurs 0

1982 Western Conference Finals

1983

Los Angeles Lakers 4, San Antonio Spurs 2

1983 Western Conference Finals

1986

Los Angeles Lakers 3, San Antonio Spurs 0

1986 Western Conference First Round

1988

Los Angeles Lakers 3, San Antonio Spurs 0

1988 Western Conference First Round

1995

Los Angeles Lakers 2, San Antonio Spurs 4

1995 Western Conference Semifinals

1999

Los Angeles Lakers 0, San Antonio Spurs 4

1999 Western Conference Semifinals

2001

Los Angeles Lakers 4, San Antonio Spurs 0

2001 Western Conference Finals

== Conference finals ==
=== Eastern Conference finals ===
==== (1) New Jersey Nets vs. (3) Boston Celtics ====
The Nets won game one, but Boston came back to steal game two in New Jersey to send the series back to Boston tied 1-1. In Game 3, the Celtics were down by as much as 26 points (21 coming into the 4th quarter), but they accomplished the biggest comeback in NBA Playoff history as the Celtics outscored the Nets 41–16 in the fourth quarter. The Celtics almost completed another comeback in game four, but the Nets held on for the victory to tie the series at two games apiece. The Nets won games five and six to advance to the team's first of two consecutive NBA Finals.

NBC

May 19
5:30 PM

Boxscore

Boston Celtics 97, New Jersey Nets 104
Scoring by quarter: 27–31, 22–26, 19–24, 29–23
Pts: Pierce, Walker 27 each Rebs: Tony Battie 11; Asts: Kenny Anderson 6	Pts: Jason Kidd 18; Rebs: Jason Kidd 13; Asts: Jason Kidd 11
New Jersey leads series, 1–0

Continental Airlines Arena, East Rutherford, New Jersey
Attendance: 20,049
Referees: Ron Garretson, Steve Javie, Jack Nies

TNT

May 21
8:30 PM

Boxscore

Boston Celtics 93, New Jersey Nets 86
Scoring by quarter: 27–17, 21–25, 27–19, 18–25
Pts: Antoine Walker 26; Rebs: Paul Pierce 14; Asts: Kenny Anderson 7	Pts: Jason Kidd 23; Rebs: Jason Kidd 16; Asts: Jason Kidd 10
Series tied, 1–1

Continental Airlines Arena, East Rutherford, New Jersey
Attendance: 19,850
Referees: Ted Bernhardt, Dan Crawford, Derrick Stafford

NBC

May 25
5:30 PM

Boxscore

New Jersey Nets 90, Boston Celtics 94
Scoring by quarter: 28–13, 26–21, 20–19, 16–41
Pts: Kerry Kittles 19; Rebs: Todd MacCulloch 11; Asts: Jason Kidd 11	Pts: Paul Pierce 28; Rebs: Antoine Walker 12; Asts: Pierce, Walker 4 each
Boston leads series, 2–1

FleetCenter, Boston, Massachusetts
Attendance: 18,624
Referees: Joe Crawford, Bob Delaney, Bill Spooner

NBC

May 27
5:30 PM

Boxscore

New Jersey Nets 94, Boston Celtics 92
Scoring by quarter: 31–18, 17–24, 25–27, 21–23
Pts: Kerry Kittles 22; Rebs: Keith Van Horn 10; Asts: Jason Kidd 9	Pts: Paul Pierce 31; Rebs: three players 9 each Asts: four players 4 each
Series tied, 2–2

FleetCenter, Boston, Massachusetts
Attendance: 18,624
Referees: Dick Bavetta, Mike Callahan, Tom Washington

NBC

May 29
9:00 PM

Boxscore

Boston Celtics 92, New Jersey Nets 103
Scoring by quarter: 16–31, 22–24, 31–17, 23–31
Pts: Paul Pierce 24; Rebs: Antoine Walker 13; Asts: Kenny Anderson 6	Pts: Kerry Kittles 21; Rebs: Jason Kidd 12; Asts: Jason Kidd 7
New Jersey leads series, 3–2

Continental Airlines Arena, East Rutherford, New Jersey
Attendance: 19,850
Referees: Joe DeRosa, Bernie Fryer, Eddie F. Rush

NBC

May 31
7:00 PM

Boxscore

New Jersey Nets 96, Boston Celtics 88
Scoring by quarter: 21–28, 23–26, 26–15, 26–19
Pts: Kenyon Martin 16; Rebs: Jason Kidd 13; Asts: Jason Kidd 13	Pts: Kenny Anderson 18; Rebs: Antoine Walker 9 Asts: Kenny Anderson 7
New Jersey wins series, 4–2

FleetCenter, Boston, Massachusetts
Attendance: 18,624
Referees: Steve Javie, Bennett Salvatore, Don Vaden

Regular-season series
Boston won 3–1 in the regular-season series

October 31, 2001

Recap

New Jersey Nets 95, Boston Celtics 92

FleetCenter, Boston

December 1, 2001

Recap

Boston Celtics 105, New Jersey Nets 98 (OT)

Continental Airlines Arena, East Rutherford, New Jersey

March 13, 2002

Recap

New Jersey Nets 89, Boston Celtics 97

FleetCenter, Boston

April 7, 2002

Recap

Boston Celtics 102, New Jersey Nets 90

Continental Airlines Arena, East Rutherford, New Jersey

This was the first playoff meeting between the Celtics and the Nets.

=== Western Conference finals ===
==== (1) Sacramento Kings vs. (3) Los Angeles Lakers ====
The 2002 Western Conference finals is widely regarded as one of the best series in NBA playoff history, with the last four games coming down to the final seconds. Two games were decided on game winning shots and Game 7 was decided in overtime. However, the series was marred by controversy and allegations of corruption. On June 10, 2008, convicted NBA referee Tim Donaghy's attorney filed a court document alleging that Game 6 was fixed by two referees. The letter states that Donaghy "learned from Referee A that Referees A and F wanted to extend the series to seven games. Tim knew Referees A and F to be 'company men', always acting in the interest of the NBA, and that night, it was in the NBA's interest to add another game to the series." The Lakers won Game 6 106–102, attempting 18 more free throws than the Kings in the fourth quarter, and went on to win the series, and eventually the NBA championship. The document claimed that Donaghy told federal agents that in order to increase television ratings and ticket sales, "top executives of the NBA sought to manipulate games using referees". It also said that NBA officials would tell referees to not call technical fouls on certain players, and states that a referee was privately reprimanded by the league for ejecting a star player in the first quarter of a January 2000 game. Stern denied the accusations, calling Donaghy a "singing, cooperating witness".

The Lakers and Kings split the first two games in Sacramento. Los Angeles raced out to a 36-point first quarter in Game 1 behind 67% shooting and never trailed, paced by Kobe Bryant's 30 point effort and 26 points from Shaquille O'Neal. Chris Webber had 28 points and 14 rebounds, but the other Kings combined shot under 40 percent. Sacramento rebounded to win Game 2, paced behind Webber (21 points, 13 rebounds) and Mike Bibby (20 points). O'Neal had 35 points and 13 rebounds, but struggled with foul trouble; Bryant added 22 points but shot 9-for-21 from the field and was suffering from food poisoning which he contracted from a meal at the team hotel, and some felt it was done deliberately by the hotel staff. The loss snapped the NBA record 12-game playoff road winning streak for the Lakers.

The Kings went to Staples Center and dominated Game 3 to regain home-court advantage, leading by as many as 27 and never trailing. They were again paced by Webber and Bibby, who combined for 50 points, and got solid contributions from Doug Christie (17 points, 12 rebounds, 6 assists, 3 steals) and Vlade Divac (11 points, 9 rebounds and 3 blocks). Other than a brief 3-point barrage in the 4th quarter by the Lakers to cut the lead to 12, there was not much help provided for O'Neal, who had 20 points and 19 rebounds.

In Game 4, Sacramento again got out to a fast start with a 40-point first quarter and built a 24-point first half lead. However, the Lakers cut the lead to 14 at halftime with a Samaki Walker 3-pointer at the buzzer that should not have counted (replay was not used at the time), and to 7 after three quarters. They whittled it down to 2 on the final possession with a chance to tie or win it, but Bryant missed a running layup and Shaq missed a put-back attempt. Divac knocked the ball away from the hoop in an attempt to run out the clock, but instead it wound up going to a wide open Robert Horry behind the 3 point line, who hit the 3 over Webber at the buzzer to give the Lakers an improbable victory, which tied the series going back to Sacramento. Horry scored 11 of his 18 points in the 4th quarter, including two more crucial 3-pointers. O'Neal finished with 27 points and 18 rebounds, Bryant had 25. Divac, Webber and Bibby all finished with 20+ points for the Kings.

As the series shifted back to Sacramento for Game 5, the Kings trailed almost the entire fourth quarter, but a jump shot by Bibby off a screen with 8.2 seconds left gave them the lead and was the game-winner in a 92–91 win. Bibby scored 23 in all, and Webber had 29 points and 13 rebounds in support. Bryant led Los Angeles with 30 points, but missed a potential game winner at the buzzer. O'Neal had 28 points, but did not take a shot in the 4th quarter and fouled out.

Game 6 is considered to be one of the most controversial games in not just NBA history, but arguably all of North American professional sports history, as numerous questionable calls went against the Kings in the fourth quarter. The Lakers, led by O'Neal's 41 points and 17 rebounds, won 106–102, setting the stage for Game 7 in Sacramento. There are allegations that the game was affected by the referees in relationship to the Tim Donaghy scandal. The Lakers shot 40 free throws overall, 27 in the fourth quarter alone, and the Kings' big men were plagued with foul trouble (Divac, Webber, Scot Pollard, and Lawrence Funderburke were called for 20 fouls, with Divac and Pollard both fouling out). Webber nearly had a triple double (26 points, 13 rebounds and 8 assists), Bibby scored 23, and Divac had 12 points and 12 rebounds. ESPN's Pardon the Interruption co-host and The Washington Post sports columnist Michael Wilbon responded to the calls in Game 6: "I wrote down in my notebook six calls that were stunningly incorrect, all against Sacramento, all in the fourth quarter when the Lakers made five baskets and 21 foul shots to hold on to their championship." For example, Wilbon pointed out that Kobe Bryant did not get a foul called on him after elbowing Mike Bibby in front of an official.

Game 7 was tense, featuring 16 ties and 19 lead changes. In the final ten seconds with Los Angeles up 99–98, Peja Stojaković air-balled a wide open 3, and O'Neal was fouled on the rebound. After O'Neal hit 1 of 2 free throws, Bibby was fouled by Bryant and made both free throws to force overtime. The Kings' offense stalled in the extra period, and the Lakers prevailed 112–106. Sacramento was undone by poor free throw shooting (16–30 from the line), a horrid 2–20 from behind the arc, and a seeming unwillingness for anyone other than Bibby to take crucial shots down the stretch. O'Neal scored 35 and Bryant added 30 in the victory, as all five Lakers starters finished in double figures. Bibby finished with 29 points, and Webber finished with 20 points, 11 rebounds, and 8 assists. Divac added 15 points and 10 rebounds.

This would be the last Western Conference finals to be decided in seven games until 2016, and remains the last time that a conference championship was decided in overtime of Game 7 as of 2026.

Announcers: for NBC, Mike Breen announced Game 1, Marv Albert Games 3–7; Bill Walton & Steve Jones joined them as the analysts. TNT had Kevin Harlan, Danny Ainge, & John Thompson on hand for Game 2.

NBC

May 18
6:30 PM

Boxscore

Los Angeles Lakers 106, Sacramento Kings 99
Scoring by quarter: 36–22, 22–23, 24–24, 24–30
Pts: Kobe Bryant 30; Rebs: Shaquille O'Neal 9 Asts: three players 5 each	Pts: Chris Webber 28; Rebs: Chris Webber 14; Asts: Chris Webber 6
LA Lakers lead series, 1–0

ARCO Arena, Sacramento, California
Attendance: 17,317
Referees: Dick Bavetta, Mike Callahan, Tom Washington

TNT

May 20
9:30 PM

Boxscore

Los Angeles Lakers 90, Sacramento Kings 96
Scoring by quarter: 26–25, 24–27, 17–24, 23–20
Pts: Shaquille O'Neal 35; Rebs: Robert Horry 20; Asts: Fisher, Horry 4 each	Pts: Chris Webber 21; Rebs: Vlade Divac 14; Asts: Mike Bibby 8
Series tied, 1–1

ARCO Arena, Sacramento, California
Attendance: 17,317
Referees: Joe DeRosa, Bernie Fryer, Eddie F. Rush

NBC

May 24
9:00 PM

Boxscore

Sacramento Kings 103, Los Angeles Lakers 90
Scoring by quarter: 32–15, 20–25, 23–12, 28–38
Pts: Chris Webber 26; Rebs: Chris Webber 12; Asts: Christie, Webber 6 each	Pts: Kobe Bryant 22; Rebs: Shaquille O'Neal 19; Asts: Brian Shaw 7
Sacramento leads series, 2–1

Staples Center, Los Angeles, California
Attendance: 18,997
Referees: Steve Javie, Bennett Salvatore, Don Vaden

NBC

May 26
5:30 PM

Boxscore

Sacramento Kings 99, Los Angeles Lakers 100
Scoring by quarter: 40–20, 25–31, 15–22, 19–27
Pts: Vlade Divac 23; Rebs: Hedo Türkoğlu 12; Asts: Christie, Webber 5 each	Pts: Shaquille O'Neal 27; Rebs: Shaquille O'Neal 18; Asts: Robert Horry 5
Series tied, 2–2

Staples Center, Los Angeles, California
Attendance: 18,997
Referees: Dan Crawford, Ron Garretson, Ken Mauer

NBC

May 28
9:00 PM

Boxscore

Los Angeles Lakers 91, Sacramento Kings 92
Scoring by quarter: 33–27, 13–24, 28–22, 17–19
Pts: Kobe Bryant 30; Rebs: Robert Horry 11; Asts: three players 3 each	Pts: Chris Webber 29; Rebs: Chris Webber 13; Asts: three players 3 each
Sacramento leads series, 3–2

ARCO Arena, Sacramento, California
Attendance: 17,317
Referees: Joe Crawford, Jack Nies, Bill Spooner

NBC

May 31
9:30 PM

Boxscore

Sacramento Kings 102, Los Angeles Lakers 106
Scoring by quarter: 26–28, 30–23, 19–24, 27–31
Pts: Chris Webber 26; Rebs: Chris Webber 13; Asts: Chris Webber 8	Pts: Shaquille O'Neal 41; Rebs: Shaquille O'Neal 17; Asts: Bryant, Horry 5 each
Series tied, 3–3

Staples Center, Los Angeles, California
Attendance: 18,997
Referees: Dick Bavetta, Ted Bernhardt, Bob Delaney

NBC

June 2
7:30 PM

Boxscore

Los Angeles Lakers 112, Sacramento Kings 106 (OT)
Scoring by quarter: 22–21, 30–33, 21–20, 27–26, Overtime: 12–6
Pts: Shaquille O'Neal 35; Rebs: Rick Fox 14; Asts: Bryant, Fox 7 each	Pts: Mike Bibby 29; Rebs: Vlade Divac 10; Asts: Chris Webber 11
LA Lakers win series, 4–3

ARCO Arena, Sacramento, California
Attendance: 17,317
Referees: Dan Crawford, Bernie Fryer, Eddie F. Rush

Regular-season series
Los Angeles won 3–1 in the regular-season series

November 18, 2001

Recap

Sacramento Kings 85, Los Angeles Lakers 93

Staples Center, Los Angeles

December 7, 2001

Recap

Los Angeles Lakers 91, Sacramento Kings 97

ARCO Arena, Sacramento, California

March 24, 2002

Recap

Los Angeles Lakers 97, Sacramento Kings 96

ARCO Arena, Sacramento, California

April 17, 2002

Recap

Sacramento Kings 95, Los Angeles Lakers 109

Staples Center, Los Angeles

This was the tenth playoff meeting in the history of the Kings-Lakers rivalry, with the Lakers winning eight of the first nine meetings.

Previous playoff series
Los Angeles leads 8–1 in all-time playoff series

1949

Minneapolis Lakers 2, Rochester Royals 0

1949 Western Division Finals

1951

Minneapolis Lakers 1, Rochester Royals 3

1951 Western Division Finals

1952

Minneapolis Lakers 3, Rochester Royals 1

1952 Western Division Finals

1954

Minneapolis Lakers 1, Rochester Royals 0

1954 Western Division Round Robin Semifinals

1954

Minneapolis Lakers 2, Rochester Royals 1

1954 Western Division Finals

1955

Minneapolis Lakers 2, Rochester Royals 1

1955 Western Division Semifinals

1984

Los Angeles Lakers 3, Kansas City Kings 0

1984 Western Conference First Round

2000

Los Angeles Lakers 3, Sacramento Kings 2

2000 Western Conference First Round

2001

Los Angeles Lakers 4, Sacramento Kings 0

2001 Western Conference Semifinals

== NBA Finals (W3) Los Angeles Lakers vs. (E1) New Jersey Nets ==
NBC

June 5
9:00 pm

Recap

New Jersey Nets 94, Los Angeles Lakers 99
Scoring by quarter: 14–29, 22–19, 27–24, 31–27
Pts: Jason Kidd 23; Rebs: Jason Kidd 10; Asts: Jason Kidd 10	Pts: Shaquille O'Neal 36; Rebs: Shaquille O'Neal 16; Asts: Kobe Bryant 6
LA Lakers lead series, 1–0

Staples Center, Los Angeles
Attendance: 18,997
Referees: Joe Crawford, Ron Garretson, Jack Nies

NBC

June 7
9:00 pm

Recap

New Jersey Nets 83, Los Angeles Lakers 106
Scoring by quarter: 21–27, 22–22, 18–28, 22–29
Pts: Kerry Kittles 23; Rebs: Jason Kidd 9 Asts: Jason Kidd 7	Pts: Shaquille O'Neal 40; Rebs: Shaquille O'Neal 12; Asts: Shaquille O'Neal 8
LA Lakers lead series, 2–0

Staples Center, Los Angeles
Attendance: 18,997
Referees: Don Vaden, Bennett Salvatore, Steve Javie

NBC

June 9
8:30 pm

Recap

Los Angeles Lakers 106, New Jersey Nets 103
Scoring by quarter: 31–23, 21–23, 26–32, 28–25
Pts: Kobe Bryant 36; Rebs: Shaquille O'Neal 11; Asts: Derek Fisher 6	Pts: Jason Kidd 30; Rebs: Van Horn, Kidd 5 each Asts: Jason Kidd 10
LA Lakers lead series, 3–0

Continental Airlines Arena, East Rutherford
Attendance: 19,215
Referees: Bob Delaney, Dan Crawford, Dick Bavetta

NBC

June 12
9:00 pm

Recap

Los Angeles Lakers 113, New Jersey Nets 107
Scoring by quarter: 27–34, 31–23, 26–23, 29–27
Pts: Shaquille O'Neal 34; Rebs: Shaquille O'Neal 10; Asts: Kobe Bryant 8	Pts: Kenyon Martin 35; Rebs: Kenyon Martin 11; Asts: Jason Kidd 12
LA Lakers win series, 4–0

Continental Airlines Arena, East Rutherford
Attendance: 19,296
Referees: Ted Bernhardt, Eddie Rush, Bernie Fryer

In Game 1, the Nets stayed within striking distance, but Shaquille O'Neal's 36 points and 16 rebounds led the Lakers to victory. In Game 2, the Nets were blown out by 23, with O'Neal leading the way again, putting up 40 points and 12 rebounds and coming within 2 assists of a triple double. This brought the series to New Jersey with the Lakers up 2–0. Game 3 was a close matchup with Jason Kidd, Kenyon Martin, O'Neal, and Kobe Bryant all scoring 26 or more points. Bryant and O'Neal's combined 71 points was too much for the Nets to handle though, and the Lakers took a 3–0 series lead. In Game 4, O'Neal put up 34 points and the Lakers won the game and the championship, accomplishing the NBA's second three-peat in seven years. Game 4 is Mitch Richmond's final NBA game. Game 4 was also the last NBA game to be televised on NBC until the 2025–26 season.

Regular-season series
Tied 1–1 in the regular-season series

March 5, 2002

Recap

New Jersey Nets 92, Los Angeles Lakers 101

Staples Center, Los Angeles

April 2, 2002

Recap

Los Angeles Lakers 92, New Jersey Nets 94

Continental Airlines Arena, East Rutherford, New Jersey

This was the first playoff meeting between the Lakers and the Nets.

== Statistical leaders ==
Category	Game high			Average			
Category	Player	Team	High	Player	Team	Avg.	GP
Points	Paul Pierce	Boston Celtics	46	Tracy McGrady	Orlando Magic	30.8	4
Rebounds	Tim Duncan	San Antonio Spurs	25	Kevin Garnett	Minnesota Timberwolves	18.7	3
Assists	Steve Nash	Dallas Mavericks	15	John Stockton	Utah Jazz	10.0	4
Steals	Baron Davis	Charlotte Hornets	7	Baron Davis	Charlotte Hornets	3.6	9
Blocks	Tim Duncan	San Antonio Spurs	7	Tim Duncan	San Antonio Spurs	4.3	9
