= Mike Bibby =

American basketball player & coach (born 1978)

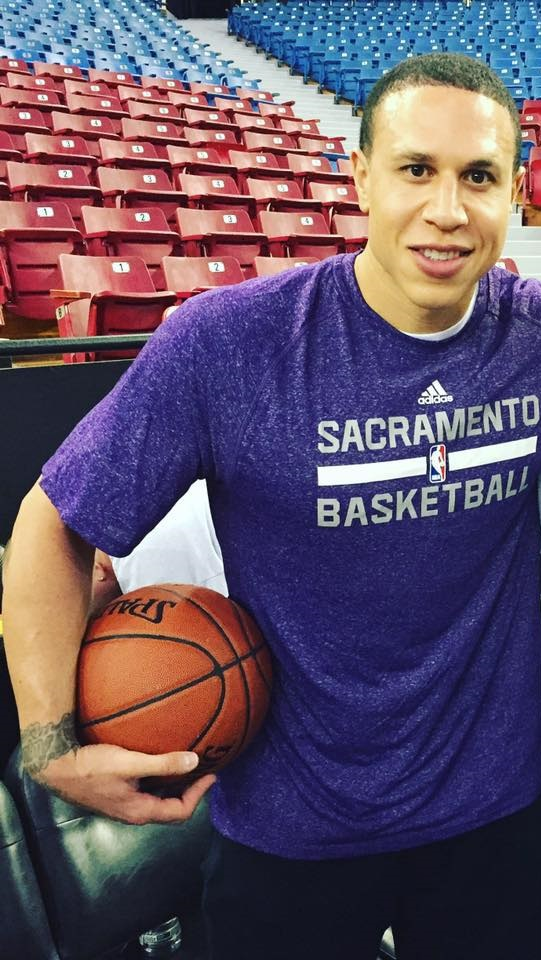
- Bibby in 2015

Sacramento State Hornets
- Title: Head coach
- League: Big West Conference

Personal information
- Born: May 13, 1978 (age 48) Cherry Hill, New Jersey, U.S.
- Listed height: 6 ft 2 in (1.88 m)
- Listed weight: 195 lb (88 kg)

Career information
- High school: Shadow Mountain (Phoenix, Arizona)
- College: Arizona (1996–1998)
- NBA draft: 1998: 1st round, 2nd overall pick
- Drafted by: Vancouver Grizzlies
- Playing career: 1998–2012
- Position: Point guard
- Number: 10, 00, 0, 20
- Coaching career: 2013–present

Career history

Playing
- 1998–2001: Vancouver Grizzlies
- 2001–2008: Sacramento Kings
- 2008–2011: Atlanta Hawks
- 2011: Washington Wizards
- 2011: Miami Heat
- 2011–2012: New York Knicks

Coaching
- 2013–2014: Shadow Mountain HS (assistant)
- 2014–2019: Shadow Mountain HS
- 2019: Hillcrest Prep HS
- 2025−present: Sacramento State

Career highlights
- As player: NBA All-Rookie First Team (1999); NCAA champion (1997); Consensus first-team All-American (1998); Pac-10 Player of the Year (1998); First-team All-Pac-10 (1998); Pac-10 Freshman of the Year (1997); No. 10 retired by Arizona Wildcats; Mr. Basketball USA (1996); First-team Parade All-American (1996); McDonald's All-American (1996)

Career NBA statistics
- Points: 14,698 (14.7 ppg)
- Rebounds: 3,103 (3.1 rpg)
- Assists: 5,517 (5.5 apg)
- Stats at NBA.com
- Stats at Basketball Reference
Medals
Men's basketball
Representing United States
FIBA Americas Championship
Gold medal – first place	2003 San Juan	National team

Michael Bibby (born May 13, 1978) is an American college basketball coach and former player who is the head coach for the Sacramento State Hornets of the Big West Conference (BWC). He played for 14 seasons in the National Basketball Association (NBA) as a point guard.

Bibby played college basketball for the Arizona Wildcats, with whom he won the 1997 NCAA Championship during his freshman season. He was named Pac-10 Player of the Year and was a first-team All-American selection during his sophomore year, en route to being drafted second overall by the Vancouver Grizzlies in the 1998 NBA draft.

After spending three seasons with the Grizzlies, Bibby was traded to the Sacramento Kings in 2001, where he helped the team reach the Western Conference Finals in 2002 as their starting point guard. After seven seasons in Sacramento, he was dealt to the Atlanta Hawks in 2008 and spent parts of four seasons with the team. After a short stint with the Washington Wizards, Bibby signed with the Miami Heat in 2011, with whom he reached the 2011 NBA Finals as a starter. He finished his career with the New York Knicks during the 2011–12 season.

== Early life ==
Bibby attended Shadow Mountain High School in Phoenix, and won an Arizona state championship as a point guard under coach Jerry Conner. He is the son of professional basketball player Henry Bibby and the nephew of Major League Baseball pitcher Jim Bibby.

== College career ==
Although his father, former UCLA basketball star Henry Bibby, was named the head coach at USC when Bibby was a senior in high school, Bibby committed to Arizona. As a freshman playing under coach Lute Olson, Bibby helped lead the Wildcats to the NCAA championship in 1997, scoring 19 points in the overtime, 84–79 NCAA Championship Game win versus the University of Kentucky and finished third in the voting for the 1998 Wooden Award. He was selected to the ’97 All-Final Four Team, after also being named Pac-10 Freshman of the Year after posting averages of 13.5 ppg, 5.2 apg and 3.2 rpg. Bibby and his father are one of four father-son duos to each win an NCAA basketball championship. (Note: The others are Marques and Kris Johnson, Scott and Sean May, and Derek and Nolan Smith.)

His sophomore year was just as impressive, as he was named Pac-10 Player of the Year (1997–98), after averaging 17.2 ppg, 5.7 apg, and 3.0 rpg (.464 FG%, .387 3FG%, .755 FT%). He started all 69 games during his Wildcat career and earned First-Team All-America honors after his sophomore campaign.

Following his sophomore season, Bibby entered the 1998 NBA Draft and was seen as the favorite to be selected by the Los Angeles Clippers with the first overall pick, but was instead selected by the Vancouver Grizzlies with the second overall pick.

== Professional career ==
=== Vancouver Grizzlies (1998–2001) ===
In his rookie season, Bibby averaged 13.2 points, 6.5 assists and 2.7 rebounds per game, earning NBA All-Rookie honors during the season which was abbreviated by a labor dispute. He improved those numbers in his next two seasons with the team, averaging 14.5 points per game during the 1999–2000 season and 15.9 points per game as well as what would be a career-best 8.4 assists per game during the 2000–01 season, but the Grizzlies continued to struggle. On January 16, 2000, and April 2, 2000, Bibby twice tied Vancouver's franchise record for steals in a single game with seven. On June 27, 2001, Bibby and Brent Price were traded to the Sacramento Kings for Jason Williams and Nick Anderson.

=== Sacramento Kings (2001–2008) ===
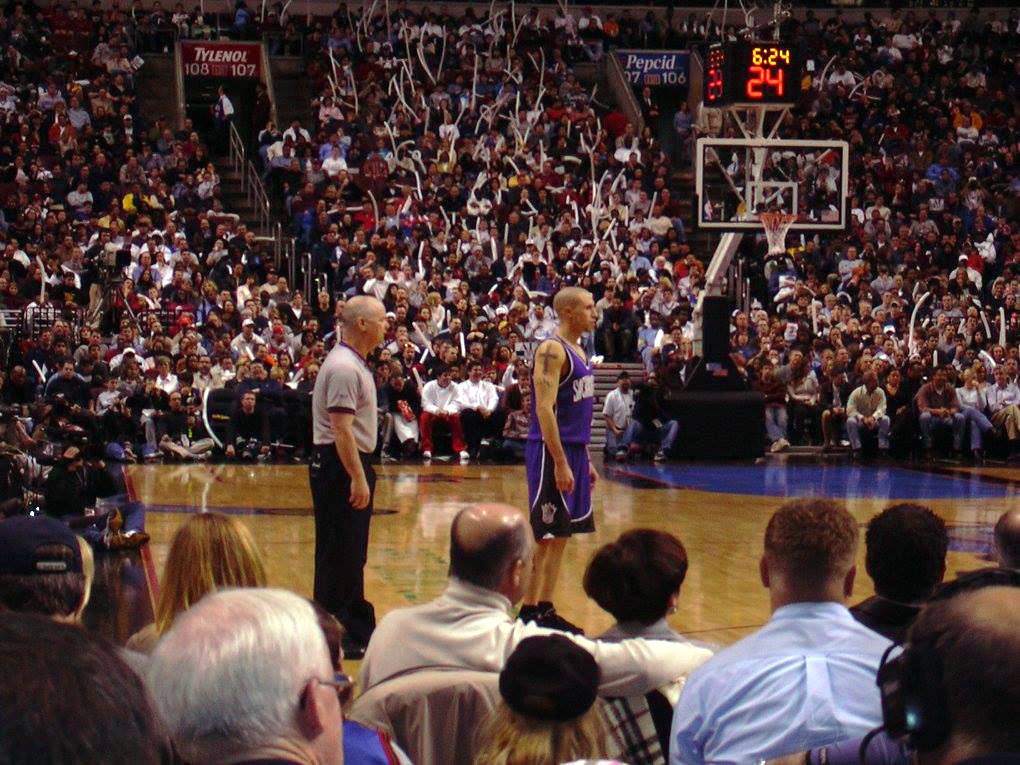
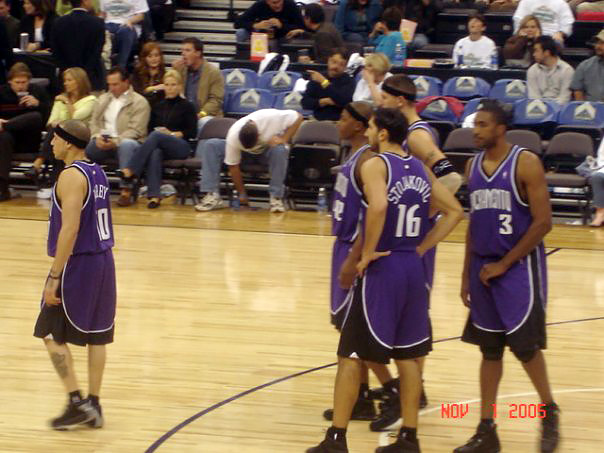
Bibby played with the Kings for seven seasons.

In his first season with Sacramento, Bibby formed best duos alongside Chris Webber. The two of them guided the Kings to an NBA best-record at 61–21 and a Pacific division title over their archrivals the Los Angeles Lakers, who at the time were the two-time defending NBA Champions. In the first two rounds of the playoffs, they easily defeated the Utah Jazz and Dallas Mavericks, setting up a Western Conference Finals match-up against the Lakers. The 2002 Western Conference Finals between the Sacramento Kings and Los Angeles Lakers was one of the most memorable in league history. Bibby's performance during the series, perhaps most memorably his Game 5 game-winner, earned him a reputation as a clutch performer, and as a reward, he was granted a 7-year, $80.5 million contract.

During the 2002–03 season, Bibby was hampered by injuries, playing in only 55 games, but still averaged a respectable 15.9 points per game with the Kings going 59–23 and securing second seed in the West, as well as a second-consecutive division title. They faced the Utah Jazz and Dallas Mavericks in the first two rounds respectively for the second consecutive playoffs, but after defeating the Jazz, 4–1, lost to the Mavericks in seven games. The Kings had lost Chris Webber to season-ending injury in game 2 against Dallas, but still forced the series to seven games.

For the 2003–04 season, Bibby posted some of the best numbers of his career, scoring 1,506 points (18.4 per game) and helping the Kings reach the playoffs. Bibby helped to lift the Kings over the Dallas Mavericks in the first round, scoring a career playoff-best 36 points in the clinching Game 5. They would go on to lose in the second round for the second consecutive year, this time to the Minnesota Timberwolves 4–3.

The next two seasons would see Sacramento taking yet another step backwards, losing in the opening round of the playoffs in both years. During the 2005–06 season, Bibby started all 82 games, and averaged a career-high 21.1 points per game. They would lose in the first round of the playoffs to the defending-champion Spurs 4–2.

Bibby was made a guest of honor by the Sacramento Kings, as he sat court side to watch the game against the Chicago Bulls on November 20, 2014. Along with former teammate Chris Webber, the pair were introduced to the crowd along with video clips as part of the team honoring its legends.

=== Atlanta Hawks (2008–2011) ===
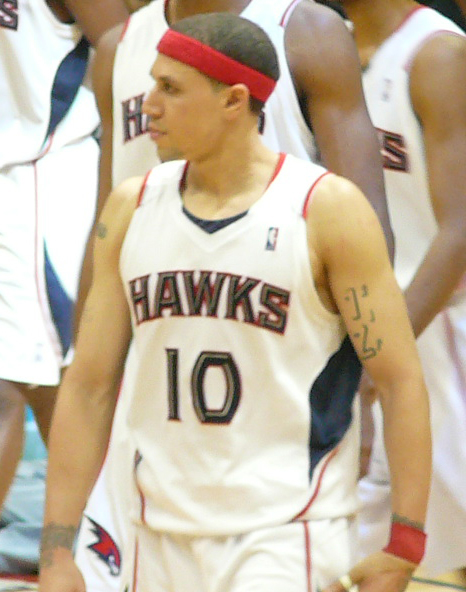
Bibby with the Hawks

On February 16, 2008, the Atlanta Hawks acquired Bibby in exchange for Shelden Williams, Anthony Johnson, Tyronn Lue, Lorenzen Wright and a 2008 second-round draft pick (which was used to select Sean Singletary).

Battling injuries and joining a Hawks team that was 22–28, Bibby put up 14.1 points and 6.6 assists per game while working in an unfamiliar offense to lead the Hawks to their first playoff berth in eight years. Despite being the eighth seed and expected to be swept out of the first round, Bibby helped the Hawks force an improbable seven-game series against the Boston Celtics, who went on to win the NBA Championship.

The next season, Bibby averaged 15 points, 5 assists and 1.2 steals per game to help the Hawks win their first playoff series since 1999, against the Miami Heat. The Hawks lost in the conference semifinals against the Cleveland Cavaliers. Bibby was also selected as a participant for the Three Point Shooting Competition.

On July 7, 2009, Bibby and the Hawks agreed to a three-year deal worth about $18 million. In the same offseason, the Hawks traded for Jamal Crawford and drafted Jeff Teague. Though Bibby would remain the Hawks starting point guard, he was not relied on to be a top scorer, as he had in years past. Bibby was credited for his leadership and unselfishness that helped Atlanta to consecutive playoff appearances.

=== Washington Wizards (2011) ===
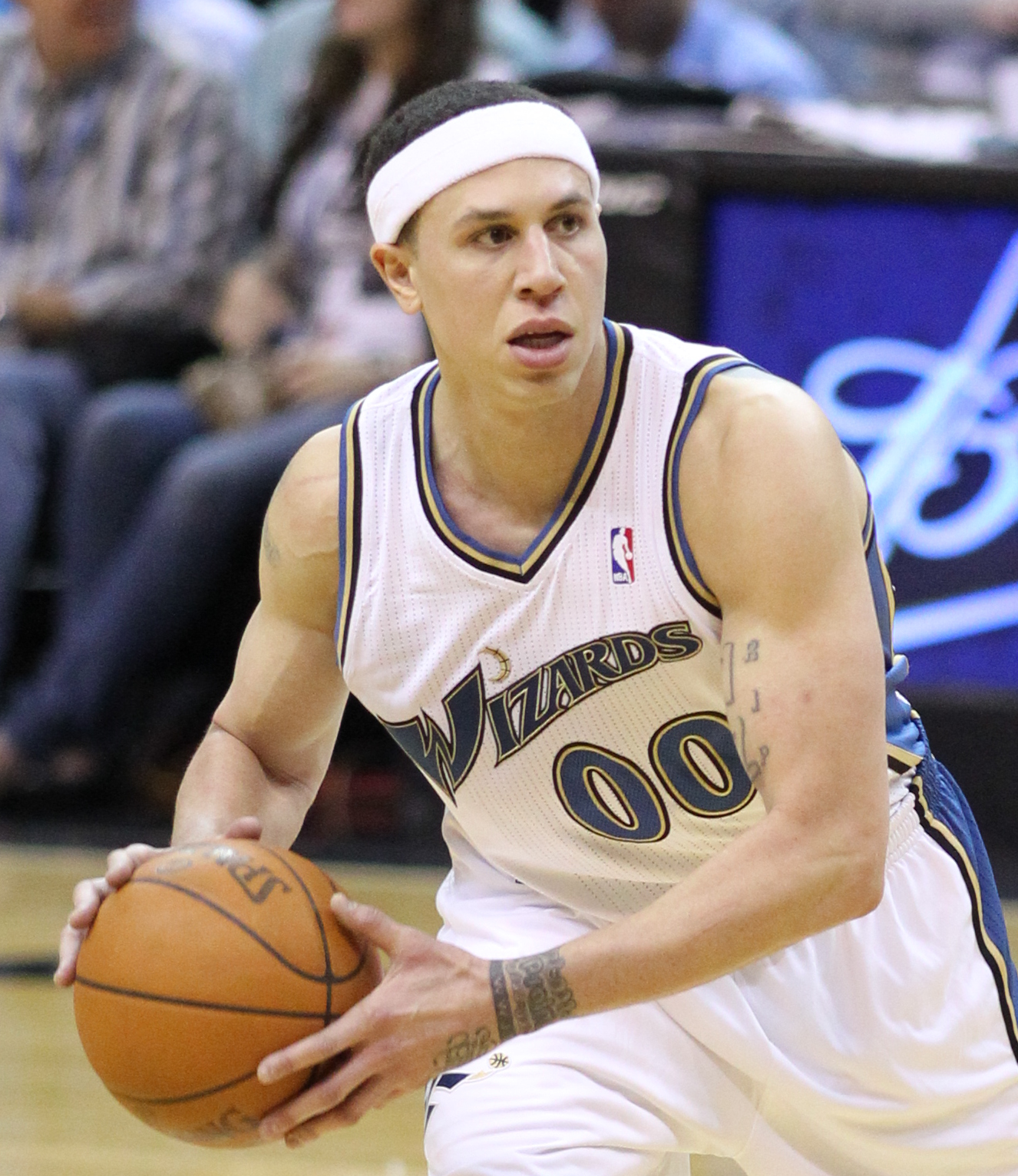
Bibby with the Wizards

On February 23, 2011, Atlanta traded Bibby to the Washington Wizards, along with Jordan Crawford, Maurice Evans and a first-round pick in the 2011 draft, in exchange for Kirk Hinrich and Hilton Armstrong. On February 28, 2011, after playing two games for Washington, Bibby agreed to a contract buyout. He gave up his following year's entire $6.2 million salary in hopes of joining a contending team, such as the Los Angeles Lakers, Boston Celtics, San Antonio Spurs or Miami Heat, all of whom expressed interest in Bibby.

=== Miami Heat (2011) ===
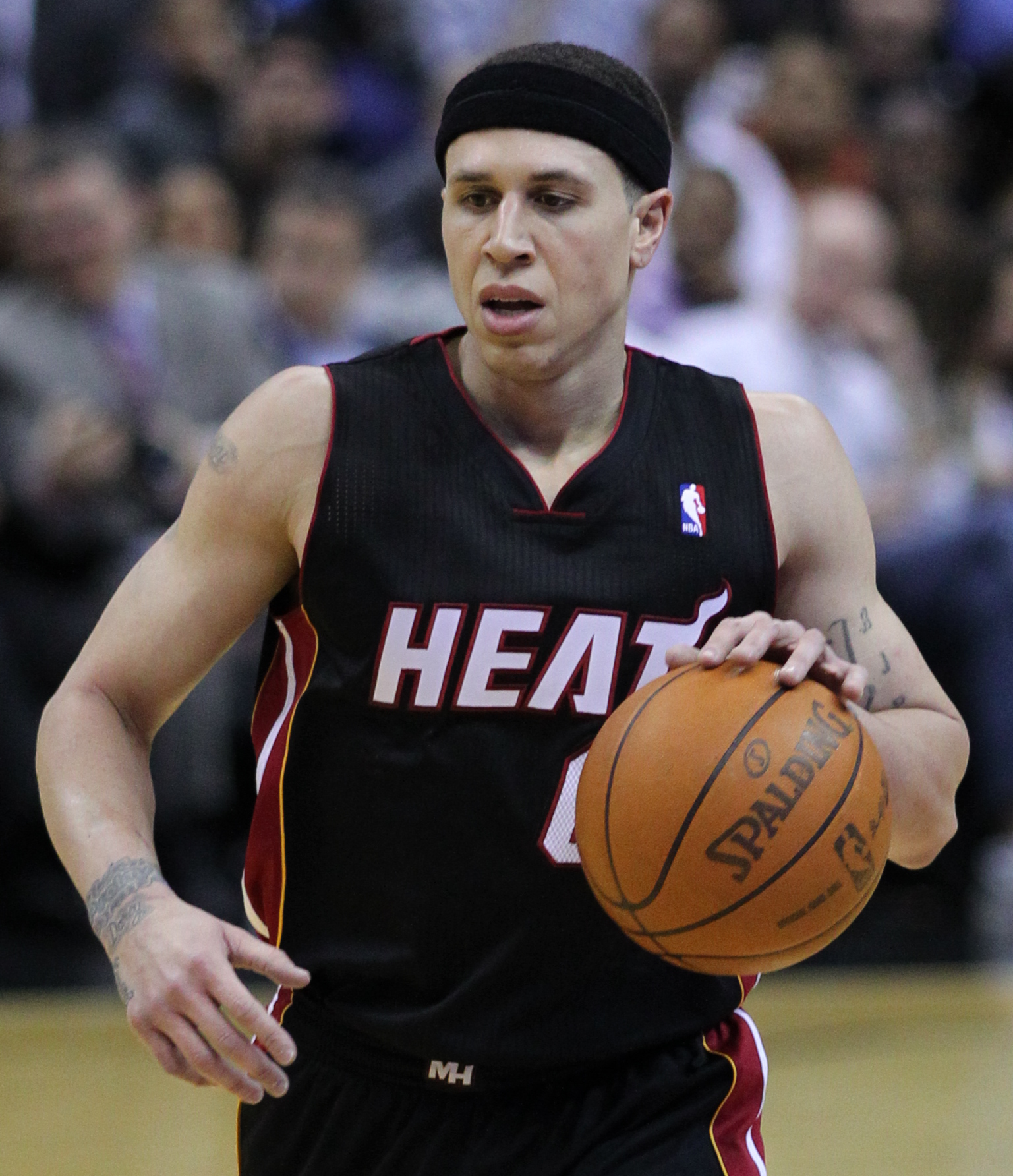
Bibby with the Heat

On March 2, 2011, the Miami Heat signed Bibby after he cleared waivers. He became the Heat's starting point guard and started all 20 playoff games he appeared in, en route to the first NBA Finals of his career. Playing against the Dallas Mavericks, the Heat were defeated 4 games to 2. Following the season, Miami elected to re-sign the younger Mario Chalmers and draft Norris Cole over re-signing Bibby.

=== New York Knicks (2011–2012) ===
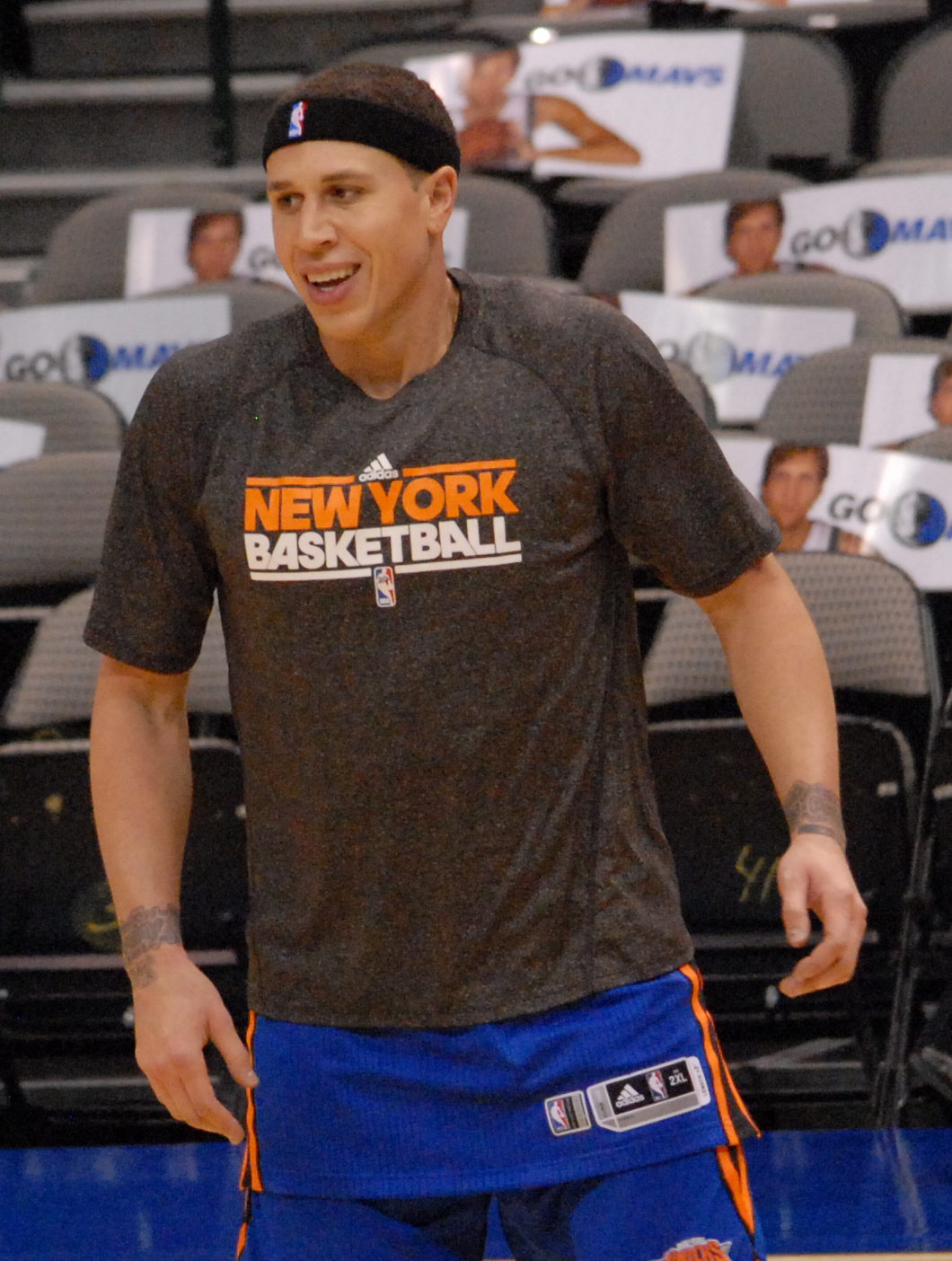
Bibby with the Knicks

After the NBA lockout, Bibby signed a one-year contract with the New York Knicks, bringing his career full circle to the team that drafted his father, Henry. Backing up Jeremy Lin during the "Linsanity" phenomenon, Bibby saw limited playing time prior to Lin's season-ending injury. He and Baron Davis split starting point guard duties through the rest of the season and in New York's first round playoff series against Bibby's former team and eventual champion Miami.

== Coaching career ==
=== Early career ===
Bibby coached his son Michael Jr. on the Amateur Athletic Union (AAU) club Team Bibby. In 2013, he returned to his alma mater, Shadow Mountain High School, as an assistant basketball coach. He working alongside his former high school coach Jerry Connor, who had also returned that year. Michael Jr. was the starting point guard for the Matadors varsity team, which also included two other teammates from Bibby's AAU team. Conner held the head coach title, but Bibby was the de facto leader of the team. After Shadow Mountain won the state championship that year, Conner left to coach another school, leaving Bibby to run the team as an assistant coach. At the time, Bibby did not hold the certifications for the head coach title.

In February 2019, the Paradise Valley Unified School District confirmed that Bibby was under investigation by Phoenix police for allegedly sexually abusing a teacher at Shadow Mountain High, where Bibby had since become head coach. The teacher alleged that in February 2017 Bibby made sexually explicit statements to her, groped her, and rubbed his genitals against her. As a result of the allegations, he was removed as head coach of the Shadow Mountain High basketball team. In April 2019, the police said that they did not find probable cause for filing charges against Bibby.

=== Hillcrest Prep HS ===
Bibby was hired by Hillcrest Prep in Phoenix in October 2019, coaching them for 10 games before both sides mutually parted ways.

=== Sacramento State ===
On March 24, 2025, Bibby was hired to serve as the head basketball coach at California State University, Sacramento. Shortly thereafter, Shaquille O'Neal was named general manager of the team. O'Neal's son, Shaqir O'Neal, has committed to play for California State University, Sacramento.

== Personal life ==
Bibby is the son of Henry Bibby, a former NBA and UCLA player and former USC basketball coach. Mike's mother, Virginia, is a native of Trinidad and Tobago. Mike is the nephew of the late former Major League Baseball player Jim Bibby (1944–2010), and the brother-in-law of former Miami Heat teammate Eddie House, who was also his Sacramento Kings teammate during the 2004–05 season. Mike also has two cousins who became professional athletes, US national team soccer player Robbie Findley and former NFL wide receiver Shaun McDonald. Bibby and his wife, Darcy, have four children. His son, Michael Jr. played college ball for South Florida before transferring to Appalachian State in 2017.

Two decades after leaving college for the NBA, Bibby graduated from the University of Nevada, Las Vegas, with a Bachelor of Arts in multidisciplinary studies in 2017.

== Career statistics ==
Legend
GP	Games played	GS	Games started	MPG	Minutes per game
FG%	Field goal percentage	3P%	3-point field goal percentage	FT%	Free throw percentage
RPG	Rebounds per game	APG	Assists per game	SPG	Steals per game
BPG	Blocks per game	PPG	Points per game	**Bold**	Career high
*	Led the league

=== NBA ===
==== Regular season ====
Year	Team	GP	GS	MPG	FG%	3P%	FT%	RPG	APG	SPG	BPG	PPG
1998–99	Vancouver	50*	50*	35.2	.430	.203	.751	2.7	6.5	**1.6**	.1	13.2
1999–00	Vancouver	**82**	**82***	38.5	.445	.363	.780	3.7	8.1	**1.6**	.2	14.5
2000–01	Vancouver	**82**	**82***	**38.9**	.454	.379	.761	3.7	**8.4**	1.3	.1	15.9
2001–02	Sacramento	80	80	33.2	.453	.370	.803	2.8	5.0	1.1	.2	13.7
2002–03	Sacramento	55	55	33.4	**.470**	.409	**.861**	2.7	5.2	1.3	.1	15.9
2003–04	Sacramento	**82**	**82**	36.3	.450	.392	.815	3.4	5.4	1.4	.2	18.4
2004–05	Sacramento	80	80	38.6	.443	.360	.775	**4.2**	6.8	**1.6**	**.4**	19.6
2005–06	Sacramento	**82***	**82***	38.6	.432	.386	.849	2.9	5.4	1.0	.1	**21.1**
2006–07	Sacramento	**82***	**82***	34.0	.404	.360	.830	3.2	4.7	1.1	.1	17.1
2007–08	Sacramento	15	12	31.5	.406	.393	.742	3.7	5.0	1.3	.1	13.5
2007–08	Atlanta	33	32	33.3	.414	.369	.797	3.2	6.5	1.1	.1	14.1
2008–09	Atlanta	79	79	34.7	.435	.390	.789	3.5	5.0	1.2	.1	14.9
2009–10	Atlanta	80	80	27.4	.416	.389	.861	2.3	3.9	.8	.0	9.1
2010–11	Atlanta	56	56	29.9	.435	.441	.630	2.6	3.6	.7	.1	9.4
2010–11	Washington	2	0	14.5	.111	.000	.000	1.5	4.0	.5	.0	1.0
2010–11	Miami	22	12	26.5	.437	**.455**	.625	2.2	2.5	.5	.1	7.3
2011–12	New York	39	4	14.3	.282	.318	.750	1.5	2.1	.5	.1	2.6
Career		1,001	950	33.9	.436	.379	.802	3.1	5.5	1.2	.1	14.7

==== Playoffs ====
Year	Team	GP	GS	MPG	FG%	3P%	FT%	RPG	APG	SPG	BPG	PPG
2002	Sacramento	16	16	41.3	.444	.424	.826	3.8	5.0	1.4	.2	**20.3**
2003	Sacramento	12	12	33.7	.422	.282	.794	2.6	5.0	1.2	**.4**	12.7
2004	Sacramento	12	12	41.4	.429	.436	.873	4.2	**7.0**	**1.9**	**.4**	20.0
2005	Sacramento	5	5	40.0	.391	.217	.778	**4.4**	6.6	1.4	**.4**	19.6
2006	Sacramento	6	6	**42.5**	.348	.346	.900	3.8	5.2	1.5	.0	16.7
2008	Atlanta	7	7	36.0	.338	.292	.656	3.1	3.1	.6	.3	10.3
2009	Atlanta	11	11	35.5	**.462**	**.542**	**.955**	3.4	4.2	.9	.2	13.2
2010	Atlanta	11	11	26.5	.450	.412	.700	2.5	2.5	.8	.0	8.5
2011	Miami	**20**	**20**	20.8	.281	.258	.500	1.8	1.1	.6	.3	3.6
2012	New York	5	1	23.6	.391	.412	.667	4.2	2.6	.2	.0	5.4
Career		105	101	33.2	.408	.371	.815	3.1	4.0	1.1	.2	12.6

=== College ===
Year	Team	GP	GS	MPG	FG%	3P%	FT%	RPG	APG	SPG	BPG	PPG
1996–97	Arizona	34	34	**32.6**	.445	**.394**	.701	**3.2**	5.2	2.2	**.2**	13.5
1997–98	Arizona	**35**	**35**	32.0	**.464**	.387	**.755**	3.0	**5.7**	**2.4**	**.2**	**17.2**
Career		69	69	32.3	.456	.390	.730	3.1	5.5	2.3	.2	15.4

== Head coaching record ==
Record table
Season	Team	Overall	Conference	Standing	Postseason
Sacramento State Hornets (Big Sky Conference) (2025–2026)
2025–26	Sacramento State	10–21	6–12	8th	
Sacramento State Hornets (Big West Conference) (2026–present)
2026–27	Sacramento State	1–0	0–0	TBD	
Sacramento State:		11–21 (.344)	6–12 (.333)		
Total:		11–21 (.344)			

== See also ==
- List of second-generation NBA players
