= 2002–03 New Jersey Nets season =

NBA professional basketball team season

- Conference champions
- Division champions
- Head coach: Byron Scott
- Arena: Continental Airlines Arena

Results
- Record: 49–33 (.598)
- Place: Division: 1st (Atlantic); Conference: 2nd (Eastern)
- Playoff finish: NBA Finals (lost to Spurs 2–4)
- Stats at Basketball Reference

Local media
- Television: YES Network, WLNY
- Radio: WFAN

The 2002–03 New Jersey Nets season was the 36th season for the New Jersey Nets in the National Basketball Association, and their 27th season in East Rutherford, New Jersey. The Nets entered the regular season as runners-up in the 2002 NBA Finals, where they were swept by the two-time defending NBA champion Los Angeles Lakers in a four-game sweep.

== Season summary ==
=== Off-season ===
During the off-season, the Nets acquired All-Star center Dikembe Mutombo from the Philadelphia 76ers, and signed free agent Rodney Rogers. However, Mutombo only played just 24 games due to a wrist injury.

=== Regular season ===
With the addition of Mutombo and Rogers, the Nets won their first four games of the regular season, posted a 10-game winning streak between December and January, which led to a 26–9 record, and later on held a 34–15 record at the All-Star break. However, the team played below .500 in winning percentage for the remainder of the season, losing four of their final five games, but managed to finish in first place in the Atlantic Division with a 49–33 record, and earned the second seed in the Eastern Conference.

Jason Kidd averaged 18.7 points, 6.3 rebounds, 8.9 assists and 2.2 steals per game, led the Nets with 126 three-point field goals, and was named to the All-NBA Second Team, and to the NBA All-Defensive Second Team. In addition, Kenyon Martin averaged 16.7 points and 8.3 rebounds per game, while second-year forward Richard Jefferson showed improvement, averaging 15.5 points and 6.4 rebounds per game, and Kerry Kittles provided the team with 13.0 points and 1.6 steals per game. Off the bench, sixth man Lucious Harris contributed 10.3 points per game, while Rogers provided with 7.0 points and 3.9 rebounds per game, and Aaron Williams averaged 6.2 points and 4.1 rebounds per game. Meanwhile, Mutombo averaged 5.8 points, 6.4 rebounds and 1.5 blocks per game, and second-year center Jason Collins provided with 5.7 points and 4.5 rebounds per game.

During the NBA All-Star Weekend at the Philips Arena in Atlanta, Kidd was selected for the 2003 NBA All-Star Game, as a member of the Eastern Conference All-Star team. Meanwhile, Jefferson was selected for the NBA Rookie Challenge Game, as a member of the Sophomores team, and also participated in the NBA Slam Dunk Contest. Kidd also finished in ninth place in Most Valuable Player voting, while Martin finished in twelfth place in Defensive Player of the Year voting, and Jefferson finished in eighth place in Most Improved Player voting; Harris finished tied in eleventh place in Sixth Man of the Year voting, and head coach Byron Scott finished in 13th place in Coach of the Year voting.

The Nets finished 23rd in the NBA in home-game attendance, with an attendance of 622,574 at the Continental Airlines Arena during the regular season.

=== NBA playoffs ===
In the Eastern Conference first round of the 2003 NBA playoffs, the Nets faced off against the seventh-seeded Milwaukee Bucks, a team that featured All-Star guard Gary Payton, Sam Cassell and Michael Redd. The Nets took a 2–1 series lead, before losing game 4 to the Bucks on the road in overtime, 119–114 at the Bradley Center. The Nets won the next two games, which included a game 6 win over the Bucks at the Bradley Center, 113–101 to win the series in six games.

In the Eastern Conference semifinals, and for the second consecutive year, the team faced off against the sixth-seeded Boston Celtics, a team that featured All-Star guard Paul Pierce, All-Star forward Antoine Walker, and Tony Delk. The Nets won the first two games over the Celtics at home at the Continental Airlines Arena, and then won the next two games on the road, including a game 4 win over the Celtics at the FleetCenter in double-overtime, 110–101 to win the series in a four-game sweep.

In the Eastern Conference finals, the Nets then faced off against the top-seeded, and Central Division champion Detroit Pistons, who were led by the trio of Richard Hamilton, Chauncey Billups, and All-Star center, and Defensive Player of the Year, Ben Wallace. The Nets won the first two games over the Pistons on the road at The Palace of Auburn Hills, before winning the next two games at home, including a game 4 win over the Pistons at the Continental Airlines Arena, 102–82 to win the series in another four-game sweep, and advance to the NBA Finals for the second consecutive year.

In the 2003 NBA Finals, the Nets faced off against the top-seeded San Antonio Spurs, who were led by the trio of All-Star forward, and Most Valuable Player of the Year, Tim Duncan, second-year star Tony Parker, and David Robinson. The Spurs took a 2–1 series lead, but the Nets managed to win game 4 at home, 77–76 at the Continental Airlines Arena, to tie the series at two games a piece. However, the Nets lost the next two games, including a game 6 road loss to the Spurs, 88–77 at the SBC Center, thus losing the series in six games, as the Spurs won their second NBA championship in franchise history.

=== Aftermath ===
Following the season, Mutombo was released to free agency, and signed as a free agent with the New York Knicks.

== Off-season ==
On August 1, the Nets re-signed Chris Childs as a free agent; Childs previously played for the Nets from 1994 to 1996. Five days later, the organization traded Todd MacCulloch and Keith Van Horn to the Philadelphia 76ers for Dikembe Mutombo. On August 14, the Nets signed Rodney Rogers as a free agent. On October 25, they signed Anthony Johnson as a free agent. Their final off-season transaction would come three days later, when they waived Donny Marshall.

== Draft picks ==
Round	Pick	Player	Position	Nationality	College
1	24	Nenad Krstić	C	Serbia and Montenegro	
2	54	Tamar Slay	SG	United States	Marshall

== Roster ==
2002–03 New Jersey Nets roster
Players

Pos.	No.	Player	Height	Weight	DOB	From
SG	1	Brandon Armstrong	6 ft 5 in (1.96 m)	188 lb (85 kg)	1980-06-16	Pepperdine
C	35	Jason Collins	7 ft 0 in (2.13 m)	255 lb (116 kg)	1978-12-02	Stanford
SG	12	Lucious Harris	6 ft 5 in (1.96 m)	190 lb (86 kg)	1970-12-18	Long Beach State
SF	24	Richard Jefferson	6 ft 7 in (2.01 m)	222 lb (101 kg)	1980-06-21	Arizona
PG	2	Anthony Johnson	6 ft 3 in (1.91 m)	190 lb (86 kg)	1974-10-02	College of Charleston
PG	5	Jason Kidd	6 ft 4 in (1.93 m)	204 lb (93 kg)	1973-03-23	California
SG	30	Kerry Kittles	6 ft 5 in (1.96 m)	179 lb (81 kg)	1974-06-12	Villanova
SF	13	Donny Marshall (injured)	6 ft 7 in (2.01 m)	230 lb (104 kg)	1972-07-17	Connecticut
PF	6	Kenyon Martin	6 ft 9 in (2.06 m)	234 lb (106 kg)	1977-12-30	Cincinnati
C	55	Dikembe Mutombo	7 ft 2 in (2.18 m)	245 lb (111 kg)	1966-06-25	Georgetown
PF	54	Rodney Rogers	6 ft 7 in (2.01 m)	235 lb (107 kg)	1971-06-20	Wake Forest
PF	21	Brian Scalabrine	6 ft 9 in (2.06 m)	241 lb (109 kg)	1978-03-18	USC
SG	8	Tamar Slay	6 ft 8 in (2.03 m)	215 lb (98 kg)	1980-04-02	Marshall
PF/C	34	Aaron Williams	6 ft 9 in (2.06 m)	220 lb (100 kg)	1971-10-02	Xavier

Coaches
Head coach
- Byron Scott
Assistant(s)
- Lawrence Frank
- Eddie Jordan
- Mike O'Koren

Legend
- (DP) Unsigned draft pick
- (FA) Free agent
- (S) Suspended
- Injured

== Regular season ==
=== Season standings ===
Atlantic Division	W	L	PCT	GB	Home	Road	Div
y-New Jersey Nets	49	33	.598	–	33–8	16–25	16–8
x-Philadelphia 76ers	48	34	.585	1	25–16	23–18	17–7
x-Boston Celtics	44	38	.537	5	25–16	19–22	13–12
x-Orlando Magic	42	40	.512	7	26–15	16–25	14–11
e-Washington Wizards	37	45	.451	12	23–18	14–27	11–13
e-New York Knicks	37	45	.451	12	24–17	13–28	9–15
e-Miami Heat	25	57	.305	24	16–25	9–32	5–19

#	Eastern Conference				
#	Team	W	L	PCT	GB
1	c-Detroit Pistons	50	32	.610	–
2	y-New Jersey Nets	49	33	.598	1
3	x-Indiana Pacers	48	34	.585	2
4	x-Philadelphia 76ers	48	34	.585	2
5	x-New Orleans Hornets	47	35	.573	3
6	x-Boston Celtics	44	38	.537	6
7	x-Milwaukee Bucks	42	40	.512	8
8	x-Orlando Magic	42	40	.512	8
9	e-New York Knicks	37	45	.451	13
10	e-Washington Wizards	37	45	.451	13
11	e-Atlanta Hawks	35	47	.427	15
12	e-Chicago Bulls	30	52	.366	20
13	e-Miami Heat	25	57	.305	25
14	e-Toronto Raptors	24	58	.293	26
15	e-Cleveland Cavaliers	17	65	.207	33

=== Game log ===
2002–03 game log
Total: 49–33 (home: 33–8; road: 16–25)
October: 1–0 (home: 1–0; road: 0–0)

Game	Date	Team	Score	High points	High rebounds	High assists	Location Attendance	Record
1	October 30	Atlanta	W 105–94	Jason Kidd (16)	Kenyon Martin (11)	Jason Kidd (12)	Continental Airlines Arena; 16,324	1–0

November : 10–6 (home: 6–1; road: 4–5)

Game	Date	Team	Score	High points	High rebounds	High assists	Location Attendance	Record
2	November 1	Indiana	W 102–91	Richard Jefferson (19)	Kidd, Rogers (8)	Jason Kidd (8)	Continental Airlines Arena; 11,156	2–0
3	November 2	@ Washington	W 87–79	Jason Kidd (18)	Jason Kidd (10)	Jason Kidd (9)	MCI Center; 20,173	3–0
4	November 4	Minnesota	W 106–82	Richard Jefferson (22)	Jason Collins (8)	Jason Kidd (12)	Continental Airlines Arena; 14,076	4–0
5	November 6	@ Milwaukee	L 93–99	Jason Kidd (24)	Martin, Mutombo (8)	Jason Kidd (5)	Bradley Center; 14,539	4–1
6	November 8	L.A. Clippers	W 106–92	Jason Kidd (35)	Kenyon Martin (9)	Jason Kidd (9)	Continental Airlines Arena; 14,334	5–1
7	November 9	@ Chicago	L 93–100	Kenyon Martin (29)	Jason Kidd (11)	Jason Kidd (12)	United Center; 22,126	5–2
8	November 13	San Antonio	W 91–82	Richard Jefferson (27)	Lucious Harris (9)	Jason Kidd (8)	Continental Airlines Arena; 11,534	6–2
9	November 15	@ Miami	W 93–84	Jason Kidd (33)	Dikembe Mutombo (10)	Jason Kidd (6)	American Airlines Arena; 15,722	7–2
10	November 16	Dallas	L 88–96	Jason Kidd (22)	Jason Kidd (9)	Jason Kidd (13)	Continental Airlines Arena; 16,634	7–3
11	November 18	Denver	W 99–79	Jason Kidd (24)	Richard Jefferson (8)	Kerry Kittles (6)	Continental Airlines Arena; 10,302	8–3
12	November 20	@ Boston	L 79–96	Jason Kidd (19)	Dikembe Mutombo (13)	Jason Kidd (6)	FleetCenter; 16,777	8–4
13	November 22	Cleveland	W 120–79	Kenyon Martin (21)	Kenyon Martin (10)	Jason Kidd (6)	Continental Airlines Arena; 12,014	9–4
14	November 23	@ Minnesota	W 96–82	Jason Kidd (18)	Aaron Williams (8)	Jason Kidd (12)	Target Center; 15,474	10–4
15	November 27	@ Phoenix	L 75–82	Jason Kidd (17)	Kenyon Martin (12)	Kerry Kittles (6)	America West Arena; 16,615	10–5
16	November 28	@ L.A. Clippers	L 118–126 (OT)	Jason Kidd (35)	Richard Jefferson (11)	Jason Kidd (8)	Staples Center; 16,277	10–6
17	November 30	@ Portland	W 93–86	Jason Kidd (28)	Richard Jefferson (10)	Jason Kidd (8)	Rose Garden Arena; 18,614	11–6

December : 12–3 (home: 11–0; road: 1–3)

Game	Date	Team	Score	High points	High rebounds	High assists	Location Attendance	Record
18	December 1	@ Seattle	L 95–96	Jason Kidd (27)	Kenyon Martin (9)	Jason Kidd (8)	KeyArena; 12,895	11–7
19	December 3	Atlanta	W 87–72	Richard Jefferson (22)	Richard Jefferson (14)	Jason Kidd (6)	Continental Airlines Arena; 10,109	12–7
20	December 7	Orlando	W 121–88	Richard Jefferson (19)	Jefferson, Kidd (8)	Jason Kidd (13)	Continental Airlines Arena; 14,623	13–7
21	December 9	Phoenix	W 106–93	Jason Kidd (20)	Kenyon Martin (7)	Jason Kidd (7)	Continental Airlines Arena; 10,248	14–7
22	December 11	Portland	W 105–104	Jason Kidd (27)	Richard Jefferson (15)	Jason Kidd (12)	Continental Airlines Arena; 11,053	15–7
23	December 13	Washington	W 79–65	Richard Jefferson (21)	Jason Kidd (10)	Jason Kidd (10)	Continental Airlines Arena; 17,208	16–7
24	December 15	@ Detroit	L 91–101	Lucious Harris (18)	Kenyon Martin (11)	Jason Kidd (8)	The Palace of Auburn Hills; 17,416	16–8
25	December 17	@ New York	L 99–101	Jason Kidd (39)	Jefferson, Martin (11)	Jason Kidd (11)	Madison Square Garden; 19,763	16–9
26	December 19	L.A. Lakers	W 98–71	Jason Kidd (27)	Jason Kidd (11)	Jason Kidd (8)	Continental Airlines Arena; 20,049	17–9
27	December 21	Detroit	W 100–92	Jason Kidd (27)	Jefferson, Collins (5)	Jason Kidd (12)	Continental Airlines Arena; 13,064	18–9
28	December 23	Chicago	W 99–83	Lucious Harris (20)	Richard Jefferson (10)	Richard Jefferson (5)	Continental Airlines Arena; 13,231	19–9
29	December 25	Boston	W 117–81	Richard Jefferson (22)	Kenyon Martin (13)	Jason Kidd (11)	Continental Airlines Arena; 20,049	20–9
30	December 27	Milwaukee	W 110–90	Lucious Harris (25)	Martin, Harris (8)	Jason Kidd (9)	Continental Airlines Arena; 13,817	21–9
31	December 28	@ Milwaukee	W 104–96	Kenyon Martin (24)	Kenyon Martin (12)	Kidd, Harris (7)	Bradley Center; 15,716	22–9
32	December 30	Cleveland	W 102–88	Kenyon Martin (28)	Harris, Martin (10)	Jason Kidd (10)	Continental Airlines Arena; 14,491	23–9

January : 9–5 (home: 3–1; road: 6–4)

Game	Date	Team	Score	High points	High rebounds	High assists	Location Attendance	Record
33	January 3	@ Miami	W 100–80	Richard Jefferson (26)	Kenyon Martin (10)	Jason Kidd (13)	American Airlines Arena; 14,624	24–9
34	January 4	@ Orlando	W 88–83	Kenyon Martin (19)	Kenyon Martin (12)	Jason Kidd (12)	TD Waterhouse Centre; 15,595	25–9
35	January 6	@ Atlanta	W 101–94	Kidd, Harris (21)	Kenyon Martin (12)	Jason Kidd (4)	Philips Arena; 6,547	26–9
36	January 9	Sacramento	L 82–118	Three players (11)	Kenyon Martin (13)	Jason Kidd (5)	Continental Airlines Arena; 20,049	26–10
37	January 10	@ Toronto	W 94–79	Jason Kidd (25)	Kenyon Martin (10)	Jason Kidd (8)	Air Canada Centre; 19,314	27–10
38	January 15	@ Philadelphia	L 107–108	Kenyon Martin (24)	Kenyon Martin (16)	Jason Kidd (16)	First Union Center; 19,564	27–11
39	January 17	Toronto	W 88–77	Jason Kidd (18)	Jefferson, Martin (8)	Jason Kidd (5)	Continental Airlines Arena; 17,107	28–11
40	January 20	@ Utah	L 103–106 (OT)	Jason Kidd (33)	Jason Kidd (13)	Jason Kidd (5)	Delta Center; 19,353	28–12
41	January 21	@ Sacramento	L 102–109	Jason Kidd (27)	Kenyon Martin (13)	Jason Kidd (5)	ARCO Arena; 17,317	28–13
42	January 23	@ Golden State	L 97–105	Jason Kidd (41)	Brian Scalabrine (10)	Jason Kidd (7)	The Arena in Oakland; 15,379	28–14
43	January 24	@ L.A. Lakers	W 89–83	Kenyon Martin (18)	Kidd, Martin (9)	Jason Kidd (7)	Staples Center; 18,997	29–14
44	January 27	@ Denver	W 92–66	Richard Jefferson (23)	Kenyon Martin (9)	Jason Kidd (5)	Pepsi Center; 13,826	30–14
45	January 29	Washington	W 86–78	Richard Jefferson (24)	Kenyon Martin (21)	Kenyon Martin (8)	Continental Airlines Arena; 20,049	31–14
46	January 31	New Orleans	W 89–72	Kenyon Martin (23)	Kenyon Martin (13)	Kerry Kittles (7)	Continental Airlines Arena; 15,311	32–14

February : 6–7 (home: 5–2; road: 1–5)

Game	Date	Team	Score	High points	High rebounds	High assists	Location Attendance	Record
47	February 1	@ Detroit	L 84–106	Kenyon Martin (29)	Kenyon Martin (15)	Martin, Johnson (4)	The Palace of Auburn Hills; 22,076	32–15
48	February 3	Seattle	W 109–108 (OT)	Kenyon Martin (35)	Martin, Collins (12)	Jason Kidd (12)	Continental Airlines Arena; 12,850	33–15
49	February 5	@ Philadelphia	W 111–85	Kerry Kittles (35)	Brian Scalabrine (8)	Jason Collins (7)	First Union Center; 20,119	34–15
All-Star Break
50	February 11	@ Orlando	L 83–92	Jason Kidd (19)	Kidd, Kittles (8)	Jason Kidd (8)	TD Waterhouse Centre; 14,549	34–16
51	February 12	@ Memphis	L 90–97	Jason Kidd (28)	Jason Collins (9)	Jason Kidd (6)	Pyramid Arena; 12,486	34–17
52	February 14	Chicago	W 90–72	Kerry Kittles (21)	Rodney Rogers (11)	Jason Kidd (12)	Continental Airlines Arena; 14,221	35–17
53	February 16	Philadelphia	L 83–90	Jason Kidd (21)	Aaron Williams (7)	Kidd, Martin (5)	Continental Airlines Arena; 20,049	35–18
54	February 18	Miami	W 84–79	Kenyon Martin (28)	Kenyon Martin (10)	Jason Kidd (10)	Continental Airlines Arena; 11,656	36–18
55	February 20	Indiana	W 98–91	Jason Kidd (31)	Richard Jefferson (12)	Jason Kidd (12)	Continental Airlines Arena; 15,051	37–18
56	February 21	@ Washington	L 86–89	Richard Jefferson (25)	Kenyon Martin (12)	Kittles, Kidd (7)	MCI Center; 20,173	37–19
57	February 23	Orlando	L 105–113	Kenyon Martin (27)	Kidd, Williams (11)	Jason Kidd (15)	Continental Airlines Arena; 20,049	37–20
58	February 25	@ Cleveland	L 90–93	Jason Kidd (31)	Jefferson, Williams (9)	Jason Kidd (9)	Gund Arena; 10,761	37–21
59	February 26	New York	W 105–76	Jason Kidd (21)	Richard Jefferson (10)	Kidd, Kittles (5)	Continental Airlines Arena; 15,380	38–21

March : 8–7 (home: 5–3; road: 3–4)

Game	Date	Team	Score	High points	High rebounds	High assists	Location Attendance	Record
60	March 2	Utah	L 90–91	Kenyon Martin (24)	Richard Jefferson (10)	Jason Kidd (15)	Continental Airlines Arena; 16,456	38–22
61	March 4	@ Dallas	L 79–88	Kenyon Martin (18)	Jason Collins (10)	Jason Kidd (4)	American Airlines Center; 19,920	38–23
62	March 6	@ San Antonio	L 78–92	Kenyon Martin (19)	Kidd, Martin (8)	Jason Kidd (13)	SBC Center; 18,797	38–24
63	March 8	@ Houston	L 71–83	Kenyon Martin (16)	Richard Jefferson (13)	Jason Kidd (4)	Compaq Center; 16,285	38–25
64	March 9	@ New Orleans	W 102–92	Kerry Kittles (20)	Jason Kidd (9)	Jason Kidd (10)	New Orleans Arena; 17,678	39–25
65	March 13	Boston	W 90–75	Lucious Harris (24)	Kidd, Jefferson (8)	Jason Kidd (12)	Continental Airlines Arena; 17,201	40–25
66	March 16	Philadelphia	L 87–92	Jason Kidd (23)	Kenyon Martin (9)	Jason Kidd (9)	Continental Airlines Arena; 20,049	40–26
67	March 18	@ Boston	W 87–74	Richard Jefferson (27)	Jason Kidd (13)	Jason Kidd (7)	FleetCenter; 18,624	41–26
68	March 19	Milwaukee	L 85–104	Kenyon Martin (28)	Kenyon Martin (14)	Jason Kidd (9)	Continental Airlines Arena; 13,131	41–27
69	March 22	Memphis	W 107–99	Kerry Kittles (25)	Kerry Kittles (11)	Jason Kidd (18)	Continental Airlines Arena; 15,340	42–27
70	March 23	@ Cleveland	L 88–93	Jason Kidd (21)	Kenyon Martin (8)	Jason Kidd (8)	Gund Arena; 11,292	42–28
71	March 26	New York	W 101–95	Kenyon Martin (24)	Kenyon Martin (10)	Jason Kidd (8)	Continental Airlines Arena; 13,734	43–28
72	March 28	@ New York	W 122–101	Richard Jefferson (39)	Jason Kidd (7)	Jason Kidd (16)	Madison Square Garden; 19,763	44–28
73	March 29	Golden State	W 109–97	Kidd, Jefferson (22)	Kidd, Martin (7)	Jason Kidd (13)	Continental Airlines Arena; 16,345	45–28
74	March 31	Houston	W 110–86	Jefferson, Kidd (30)	Jason Kidd (12)	Richard Jefferson (11)	Continental Airlines Arena; 20,049	46–28

April : 3–5 (home: 2–1; road: 1–4)

Game	Date	Team	Score	High points	High rebounds	High assists	Location Attendance	Record
75	April 2	@ New Orleans	L 97–106	Richard Jefferson (24)	Rodney Rogers (8)	Jason Kidd (13)	New Orleans Arena; 14,311	46–29
76	April 4	Miami	W 99–83	Jason Kidd (30)	Rodney Rogers (7)	Jason Kidd (8)	Continental Airlines Arena; 16,152	47–29
77	April 6	@ Toronto	W 96–87	Kenyon Martin (24)	Kenyon Martin (10)	Jason Kidd (13)	Air Canada Centre; 19,319	48–29
78	April 9	@ Atlanta	L 92–97	Jason Kidd (23)	Jason Kidd (11)	Jason Kidd (12)	Philips Arena; 17,119	48–30
79	April 11	@ Chicago	L 86–95	Kenyon Martin (29)	Kenyon Martin (8)	Jason Kidd (12)	United Center; 22,087	48–31
80	April 12	Toronto	W 94–86	Richard Jefferson (21)	Dikembe Mutombo (11)	Jason Kidd (8)	Continental Airlines Arena; 15,306	49–31
81	April 14	New Orleans	L 74–87	Kenyon Martin (23)	Kenyon Martin (15)	Jason Kidd (6)	Continental Airlines Arena; 12,723	49–32
82	April 16	@ Indiana	L 83–90	Anthony Johnson (16)	Aaron Williams (9)	Jason Kidd (8)	Conseco Fieldhouse; 17,248	49–33

2002–03 schedule

== Playoffs ==
2003 playoff game log
First round: 4–2 (home: 2–1; road: 2–1)

Game	Date	Team	Score	High points	High rebounds	High assists	Location Attendance	Series
1	April 19	Milwaukee	W 109–96	Kenyon Martin (21)	Kenyon Martin (15)	Jason Kidd (14)	Continental Airlines Arena; 16,102	1–0
2	April 22	Milwaukee	L 85–88	Kenyon Martin (22)	Kenyon Martin (12)	Jason Kidd (8)	Continental Airlines Arena; 17,633	1–1
3	April 24	@ Milwaukee	W 103–101	Jason Kidd (26)	Collins, Martin (8)	Jason Kidd (7)	Bradley Center; 17,539	2–1
4	April 26	@ Milwaukee	L 114–119 (OT)	Kenyon Martin (30)	Jason Collins (8)	Jason Kidd (10)	Bradley Center; 18,391	2–2
5	April 29	Milwaukee	W 89–82	Jason Kidd (19)	Richard Jefferson (16)	Kidd, Martin (5)	Continental Airlines Arena; 16,601	3–2
6	May 1	@ Milwaukee	W 113–101	Kenyon Martin (29)	Jason Kidd (11)	Jason Kidd (11)	Bradley Center; 18,717	4–2

Conference semifinals: 4–0 (home: 2–0; road: 2–0)

Game	Date	Team	Score	High points	High rebounds	High assists	Location Attendance	Series
1	May 5	Boston	W 97–93	Kenyon Martin (21)	Jefferson, Williams (9)	Jason Kidd (9)	Continental Airlines Arena; 17,343	1–0
2	May 7	Boston	W 104–95	Richard Jefferson (25)	Jason Kidd (11)	Jason Kidd (8)	Continental Airlines Arena; 19,934	2–0
3	May 9	@ Boston	W 94–76	Kenyon Martin (25)	Jason Kidd (9)	Jason Kidd (11)	FleetCenter; 18,624	3–0
4	May 12	@ Boston	W 110–101 (2OT)	Jason Kidd (29)	Kidd, Martin (10)	Jason Kidd (8)	FleetCenter; 18,624	4–0

Conference finals: 4–0 (home: 2–0; road: 2–0)

Game	Date	Team	Score	High points	High rebounds	High assists	Location Attendance	Series
1	May 18	@ Detroit	W 76–74	Kenyon Martin (16)	Jason Collins (10)	Jason Kidd (7)	The Palace of Auburn Hills; 22,076	1–0
2	May 20	@ Detroit	W 88–86	Kenyon Martin (25)	Jason Collins (14)	Jason Kidd (5)	The Palace of Auburn Hills; 22,076	2–0
3	May 22	Detroit	W 97–85	Jason Kidd (34)	Jason Kidd (12)	Jason Kidd (6)	Continental Airlines Arena; 19,923	3–0
4	May 24	Detroit	W 102–82	Jason Kidd (26)	Jason Kidd (12)	Jason Kidd (7)	Continental Airlines Arena; 19,923	4–0

NBA Finals: 2–4 (home: 1–2; road: 1–2)

Game	Date	Team	Score	High points	High rebounds	High assists	Location Attendance	Series
1	June 4	@ San Antonio	L 89–101	Kenyon Martin (21)	Kenyon Martin (12)	Jason Kidd (10)	SBC Center; 18,797	0–1
2	June 6	@ San Antonio	W 87–85	Jason Kidd (30)	Jason Kidd (7)	Kenyon Martin (4)	SBC Center; 18,797	1–1
3	June 8	San Antonio	L 79–84	Kenyon Martin (23)	Kenyon Martin (11)	Jason Kidd (11)	Continental Airlines Arena; 19,280	1–2
4	June 11	San Antonio	W 77–76	Kenyon Martin (20)	Kenyon Martin (13)	Jason Kidd (9)	Continental Airlines Arena; 19,280	2–2
5	June 13	San Antonio	L 83–93	Jason Kidd (29)	Kenyon Martin (9)	Jason Kidd (7)	Continental Airlines Arena; 19,280	2–3
6	June 15	@ San Antonio	L 77–88	Jason Kidd (21)	Kenyon Martin (10)	Jason Kidd (7)	SBC Center; 18,797	2–4

2003 schedule

== Player statistics ==
Legend
GP	Games played	GS	Games started	MPG	Minutes per game
FG%	Field-goal percentage	3P%	3-point field-goal percentage	FT%	Free-throw percentage
RPG	Rebounds per game	APG	Assists per game	SPG	Steals per game
BPG	Blocks per game	PPG	Points per game

=== Regular season ===
New Jersey Nets statistics
Player	GP	GS	MPG	FG%	3P%	FT%	RPG	APG	SPG	BPG	PPG
Jason Kidd	80	80	37.4	.414	.341	.841	6.3	8.9	2.2	0.3	18.7
Kenyon Martin	77	77	34.1	.470	.209	.653	8.3	2.4	1.3	0.9	16.7
Richard Jefferson	80	80	36.0	.501	.250	.743	6.4	2.5	1.0	0.6	15.5
Kerry Kittles	65	57	30.0	.467	.356	.785	3.9	2.6	1.6	0.5	13.0
Lucious Harris	77	25	25.6	.413	.346	.804	3.0	2.0	0.7	0.1	10.3
Rodney Rogers	68	0	19.2	.402	.333	.756	3.9	1.6	0.7	0.5	7.0
Aaron Williams	81	0	19.7	.453	.000	.785	4.1	1.1	0.3	0.7	6.2
Dikembe Mutombo	24	16	21.4	.374		.727	6.4	0.8	0.2	1.5	5.8
Jason Collins	81	66	23.5	.414	.000	.763	4.5	1.1	0.6	0.5	5.7
Anthony Johnson	66	2	12.8	.446	.371	.689	1.2	1.3	0.6	0.1	4.1
Brian Scalabrine	59	7	12.3	.402	.359	.833	2.4	0.8	0.3	0.3	3.1
Tamar Slay	36	0	7.6	.379	.280	.700	0.9	0.4	0.4	0.1	2.6
Brandon Armstrong	17	0	4.1	.333	.167	.833	0.2	0.1	0.2	0.1	1.4
Chris Childs	12	0	8.8	.300	.167	.667	0.4	1.3	0.7	0.1	1.3
Donny Marshall	3	0	2.0	.000	.000		1.0	0.0	0.0	0.0	0.0

=== Playoffs ===
New Jersey Nets statistics
Player	GP	GS	MPG	FG%	3P%	FT%	RPG	APG	SPG	BPG	PPG
Jason Kidd	20	20	42.6	.402	.327	.825	7.7	8.2	1.8	0.2	20.1
Kenyon Martin	20	20	38.9	.453	.091	.693	9.4	2.9	1.5	1.6	18.9
Richard Jefferson	20	20	35.6	.476	.000	.718	6.4	2.4	0.8	0.2	14.1
Kerry Kittles	20	20	30.7	.395	.413	.762	3.5	2.0	1.5	0.3	10.8
Lucious Harris	20	0	21.8	.391	.333	.783	2.6	1.6	0.5	0.0	7.8
Rodney Rogers	20	0	17.5	.372	.405	.711	2.8	1.4	0.3	0.2	6.7
Aaron Williams	19	0	17.9	.472		.742	4.6	0.9	0.3	0.9	6.5
Jason Collins	20	20	26.5	.363	.000	.836	6.3	0.9	0.7	0.6	5.9
Anthony Johnson	17	0	7.2	.548	.500	.833	0.7	1.1	0.1	0.0	2.5
Dikembe Mutombo	10	0	11.5	.467		1.000	2.7	0.6	0.3	0.9	1.8
Brian Scalabrine	7	0	2.9	.500	.000		0.6	0.0	0.0	0.0	0.6
Tamar Slay	6	0	1.8	.250	1.000		0.0	0.0	0.0	0.0	0.5

Player statistics citation:

== Awards and records ==
- Jason Kidd, All-NBA Second Team
- Jason Kidd, NBA All-Defensive Second Team
- Jason Kidd, NBA All-Star

== Transactions ==
=== Overview ===
Players Added

Via draft

- Tamar Slay

Via trade

- Dikembe Mutombo

Via free agency

- Chris Childs
- Anthony Johnson
- Rodney Rogers
Players Lost

Via trade

- Todd MacCulloch
- Keith Van Horn

Via free agency

=== Trades ===
August 6, 2002	To Philadelphia 76ers Todd MacCulloch; Keith Van Horn	To New Jersey Nets Dikembe Mutombo

=== Free agents ===
Additions
Player	Date signed	Former team
Chris Childs	August 1	Toronto Raptors
Rodney Rogers	August 14	Boston Celtics
Anthony Johnson	October 25	New Jersey Nets
Donny Marshall	March 11	New Jersey Nets

Subtractions
Player	Date signed	New Team
Donny Marshall	October 28	New Jersey Nets
Chris Childs	March 7	none (retired)

Player Transactions Citation:
