= 2002–03 Toronto Raptors season =

NBA professional basketball team season

- Head coach: Lenny Wilkens
- General manager: Glen Grunwald
- Owners: Maple Leaf Sports & Entertainment
- Arena: Air Canada Centre

Results
- Record: 24–58 (.293)
- Place: Division: 7th (Central); Conference: 14th (Eastern)
- Playoff finish: Did not qualify
- Stats at Basketball Reference

Local media
- Television: Rogers Sportsnet; Raptors NBA TV; TSN; The Score
- Radio: CJCL

The 2002–03 Toronto Raptors season was the eighth season for the Toronto Raptors in the National Basketball Association.

== Season summary ==
=== Off-season ===
During the off-season, the Raptors acquired Lamond Murray from the Cleveland Cavaliers, acquired Lindsey Hunter from the Los Angeles Lakers on draft day, and signed free agents Voshon Lenard and Jelani McCoy. However, Murray suffered a preseason right foot injury, and would miss the entire regular season.

=== Regular season ===
Early into the regular season, Vince Carter re-injured his left knee from the previous season, and only played just 43 games this season. The Raptors played around .500 in winning percentage with a 4–4 start to the season, but then posted a six-game losing streak afterwards, and then suffered a 12-game losing streak between December and January. In January, the Raptors signed free agent Rafer Alston, as the team later on held a 14–34 record at the All-Star break. The Raptors lost their final eight games of the season, finishing in seventh place in the Central Division with a disappointing 24–58 record.

Carter averaged 20.6 points per game, while Lenard averaged 14.3 points per game, and Morris Peterson provided the team with 14.1 points per game, and also led them with 116 three-point field goals. In addition, Antonio Davis provided with 13.9 points and 8.2 rebounds per game, while Alvin Williams contributed 13.2 points, 5.3 assists and 1.4 steals per game, and Jerome Williams averaged 9.7 points, 9.2 rebounds and 1.6 steals per game. Meanwhile, Hunter contributed 9.7 points per game, but only played just 29 games due to injury, Alston provided with 7.8 points and 4.1 assists per game, McCoy averaged 6.8 points and 5.3 rebounds per game, and second-year forward Michael Bradley averaged 5.0 points and 6.1 rebounds per game.

During the NBA All-Star weekend at the Philips Arena in Atlanta, Georgia, Carter was selected for the 2003 NBA All-Star Game, as a member of the Eastern Conference All-Star team. Carter was voted as the starting shooting guard for the Eastern Conference, but later on gave his starting spot to All-Star guard Michael Jordan of the Washington Wizards. The Raptors finished tenth in the NBA in home-game attendance, with an attendance of 777,507 at the Air Canada Centre during the regular season.

=== Aftermath ===
Following the season, Lenard re-signed as a free agent with his former team, the Denver Nuggets, while Hunter was traded back to his former team, the Detroit Pistons, and head coach Lenny Wilkens resigned after three seasons with the Raptors.

== NBA draft ==
Round	Pick	Player	Position	Nationality	College
1	20	Kareem Rush (traded to Los Angeles)	Shooting Guard	United States	Missouri

== Roster ==
Toronto Raptors roster
Players

Pos.	No.	Player	Height	Weight	DOB	From
PG	12	Rafer Alston	6 ft 2 in (1.88 m)	171 lb (78 kg)	1976-07-24	Fresno State
PF	14	Maceo Baston	6 ft 9 in (2.06 m)	215 lb (98 kg)	1975-05-29	Michigan
PF	5	Michael Bradley	6 ft 10 in (2.08 m)	245 lb (111 kg)	1979-04-18	Villanova
SG	15	Vince Carter	6 ft 6 in (1.98 m)	220 lb (100 kg)	1977-01-26	North Carolina
C	33	Antonio Davis	6 ft 9 in (2.06 m)	215 lb (98 kg)	1968-10-31	UTEP
PG	11	Lindsey Hunter	6 ft 2 in (1.88 m)	170 lb (77 kg)	1970-12-03	Jackson State
SF	1	Chris Jefferies	6 ft 8 in (2.03 m)	225 lb (102 kg)	1980-02-13	Fresno State
SG	2	Voshon Lenard	6 ft 4 in (1.93 m)	205 lb (93 kg)	1973-05-14	Minnesota
C	4	Jelani McCoy	6 ft 10 in (2.08 m)	245 lb (111 kg)	1977-12-06	UCLA
C	00	Eric Montross	7 ft 0 in (2.13 m)	270 lb (122 kg)	1971-09-23	North Carolina
SF	21	Lamond Murray	6 ft 7 in (2.01 m)	236 lb (107 kg)	1973-04-20	California
C	32	Mamadou N'Diaye	7 ft 0 in (2.13 m)	255 lb (116 kg)	1975-06-16	Auburn
SF	24	Morris Peterson	6 ft 7 in (2.01 m)	220 lb (100 kg)	1977-08-26	Michigan State
PG	20	Alvin Williams	6 ft 5 in (1.96 m)	185 lb (84 kg)	1974-08-06	Villanova
PF	13	Jerome Williams	6 ft 9 in (2.06 m)	206 lb (93 kg)	1973-05-10	Georgetown

Coaches
Head coach
- Lenny Wilkens
Assistant(s)
- Dick Helm
- Craig Neal
- Walker Russell
- Jay Triano

Legend
- (DP) Unsigned draft pick
- (FA) Free agent
- (S) Suspended
- Injured

Roster
Updated: February 10, 2003

=== Roster notes ===
- Center Eric Montross was on the injured reserve list due to a stress reaction in his left foot, and missed the entire regular season.
- Small forward Lamond Murray was on the injured reserve list due to a preseason right foot injury, and missed the entire regular season.

== Regular season ==
=== Lows ===
Central Division	W	L	PCT	GB	Home	Road	Div
y-Detroit Pistons	50	32	.610	–	30–11	20–21	19–9
x-Indiana Pacers	48	34	.585	2	32–9	16–25	19–9
x-New Orleans Hornets	47	35	.573	3	29–12	18–23	17–11
x-Milwaukee Bucks	42	40	.512	8	25–16	17–24	16–12
e-Atlanta Hawks	35	47	.427	15	26–15	9–32	14–14
e-Chicago Bulls	30	52	.366	20	27–14	3–38	12–16
e-Toronto Raptors	24	58	.293	26	15–26	9–32	10–18
e-Cleveland Cavaliers	17	65	.207	33	14–27	3–38	5–23

#	Eastern Conference				
#	Team	W	L	PCT	GB
1	c-Detroit Pistons	50	32	.610	–
2	y-New Jersey Nets	49	33	.598	1
3	x-Indiana Pacers	48	34	.585	2
4	x-Philadelphia 76ers	48	34	.585	2
5	x-New Orleans Hornets	47	35	.573	3
6	x-Boston Celtics	44	38	.537	6
7	x-Milwaukee Bucks	42	40	.512	8
8	x-Orlando Magic	42	40	.512	8
9	e-New York Knicks	37	45	.451	13
10	e-Washington Wizards	37	45	.451	13
11	e-Atlanta Hawks	35	47	.427	15
12	e-Chicago Bulls	30	52	.366	20
13	e-Miami Heat	25	57	.305	25
14	e-Toronto Raptors	24	58	.293	26
15	e-Cleveland Cavaliers	17	65	.207	33

=== Game log ===
2002–03 game log
October: 1–0 (home: 1–0; road: 0–0)

Game	Date	Team	Score	High points	High rebounds	High assists	Location Attendance	Record
1	October 30	Washington	W 74–68	Morris Peterson (20)	Antonio Davis (16)	Alvin Williams (6)	Air Canada Centre; 20,165	1–0

November: 4–10 (home: 2–5; road: 2–5)

Game	Date	Team	Score	High points	High rebounds	High assists	Location Attendance	Record
2	November 1	@ San Antonio	L 72–91	Vince Carter (18)	Jelani McCoy (15)	Lindsey Hunter (3)	SBC Center; 18,787	1–1
3	November 2	@ Houston	L 76–88	Lindsey Hunter (17)	Michael Bradley, Morris Peterson (7)	Alvin Williams (3)	Compaq Center; 16,285	1–2
4	November 4	Chicago	W 109–105 (OT)	Alvin Williams (25)	Jerome Williams (12)	Alvin Williams (8)	Air Canada Centre; 17,441	2–2
5	November 6	Dallas	L 92–106	Voshon Lenard (20)	Jerome Williams (9)	Lindsey Hunter (6)	Air Canada Centre; 19,800	2–3
6	November 9	@ Indiana	L 84–108	Voshon Lenard (22)	Michael Bradley (10)	Alvin Williams (7)	Conseco Fieldhouse; 15,365	2–4
7	November 12	@ Orlando	W 115–109	Alvin Williams (32)	Morris Peterson (12)	Voshon Lenard, Jerome Williams (4)	TD Waterhouse Centre; 13,402	3–4
8	November 15	Denver	W 84–79	Voshon Lenard (19)	Jerome Williams (9)	Voshon Lenard (6)	Air Canada Centre; 18,985	4–4
9	November 17	Utah	L 78–82	Alvin Williams (20)	Antonio Davis, Jelani McCoy (8)	Alvin Williams (6)	Air Canada Centre; 19,800	4–5
10	November 18	@ Atlanta	L 92–117	Voshon Lenard, Morris Peterson, Alvin Williams (17)	Voshon Lenard, Morris Peterson (6)	Alvin Williams (5)	Philips Arena; 6,374	4–6
11	November 20	Indiana	L 95–97	Voshon Lenard (22)	Antonio Davis (10)	Alvin Williams (6)	Air Canada Centre; 19,206	4–7
12	November 22	@ Philadelphia	L 80–90	Antonio Davis (27)	Antonio Davis (12)	Alvin Williams (6)	First Union Center; 19,410	4–8
13	November 24	Philadelphia	L 84–94	Alvin Williams (25)	Antonio Davis, Jerome Williams (8)	Voshon Lenard, Alvin Williams (5)	Air Canada Centre; 19,800	4–9
14	November 27	New York	L 81–87	Antonio Davis (20)	Greg Foster (9)	Alvin Williams (7)	Air Canada Centre; 19,800	4–10
15	November 29	@ Boston	W 98–95	Morris Peterson (31)	Greg Foster (9)	Alvin Williams (11)	FleetCenter; 18,624	5–10

December: 3–13 (home: 1–5; road: 2–8)

Game	Date	Team	Score	High points	High rebounds	High assists	Location Attendance	Record
16	December 1	@ Memphis	W 92–87	Vince Carter (27)	Antonio Davis (12)	Alvin Williams (8)	Pyramid Arena; 13,213	6–10
17	December 2	@ Dallas	L 102–113	Alvin Williams (27)	Antonio Davis (9)	Alvin Williams (7)	American Airlines Center; 19,696	6–11
18	December 4	@ New Orleans	L 74–89	Vince Carter (26)	Antonio Davis (11)	Jermaine Jackson (5)	New Orleans Arena; 13,342	6–12
19	December 6	Chicago	W 103–89	Voshon Lenard (23)	Vince Carter (10)	Vince Carter, Alvin Williams (5)	Air Canada Centre; 18,862	7–12
20	December 8	Portland	L 91–104	Vince Carter (25)	Michael Bradley, Jerome Williams (10)	Alvin Williams (7)	Air Canada Centre; 18,645	7–13
21	December 11	@ Cleveland	L 83–96	Voshon Lenard (24)	Jerome Williams (8)	Lindsey Hunter, Jermaine Jackson, Voshon Lenard (4)	Gund Arena; 9,090	7–14
22	December 13	Seattle	L 79–91	Lindsey Hunter (21)	Jelani McCoy, Morris Peterson (7)	Jermaine Jackson, Morris Peterson (4)	Air Canada Centre; 18,111	7–15
23	December 15	Washington	L 82–95	Lindsey Hunter (22)	Jelani McCoy (10)	Voshon Lenard, Alvin Williams (5)	Air Canada Centre; 19,800	7–16
24	December 17	@ Milwaukee	W 122–117 (OT)	Voshon Lenard (23)	Nate Huffman, Jelani McCoy (9)	Alvin Williams (7)	Bradley Center; 15,926	8–16
25	December 18	@ Chicago	L 83–96	Morris Peterson (22)	Jelani McCoy, Jerome Williams (11)	Lindsey Hunter, Alvin Williams (4)	United Center; 16,111	8–17
26	December 20	Miami	L 77–97	Voshon Lenard (19)	Jerome Williams (9)	Jermaine Jackson (3)	Air Canada Centre; 19,235	8–18
27	December 22	L.A. Lakers	L 107–109 (OT)	Morris Peterson (27)	Jerome Williams (12)	Alvin Williams (6)	Air Canada Centre; 19,800	8–19
28	December 26	@ Seattle	L 88–97	Voshon Lenard (27)	Jerome Williams (11)	Alvin Williams (6)	KeyArena; 16,139	8–20
29	December 27	@ Golden State	L 96–101	Voshon Lenard, Alvin Williams (17)	Michael Bradley (15)	Voshon Lenard (4)	The Arena in Oakland; 16,487	8–21
30	December 29	@ L.A. Lakers	L 88–104	Morris Peterson (18)	Jelani McCoy, Morris Peterson (5)	Alvin Williams (6)	Staples Center; 18,997	8–22
31	December 30	@ Utah	L 85–107	Voshon Lenard, Morris Peterson (18)	Jelani McCoy, Morris Peterson (6)	Voshon Lenard, Alvin Williams (5)	Delta Center; 19,911	8–23

January: 4–11 (home: 3–5; road: 1–6)

Game	Date	Team	Score	High points	High rebounds	High assists	Location Attendance	Record
32	January 1	@ New York	L 75–95	Alvin Williams (15)	Jelani McCoy (15)	Alvin Williams (5)	Madison Square Garden; 18,540	8–24
33	January 3	Cleveland	L 80–81	Alvin Williams (25)	Jerome Williams (18)	Lindsey Hunter (7)	Air Canada Centre; 17,667	8–25
34	January 5	New Orleans	L 84–99	Morris Peterson (17)	Jelani McCoy (8)	Alvin Williams (7)	Air Canada Centre; 18,568	8–26
35	January 6	@ Detroit	L 74–82	Antonio Davis (21)	Jerome Williams (15)	Morris Peterson (5)	The Palace of Auburn Hills; 16,239	8–27
36	January 10	New Jersey	L 79–94	Rafer Alston (17)	Jerome Williams (10)	Morris Peterson, Alvin Williams (4)	Air Canada Centre; 19,314	8–28
37	January 12	Minnesota	W 105–91	Morris Peterson (20)	Jerome Williams (14)	Rafer Alston, Alvin Williams (8)	Air Canada Centre; 19,800	9–28
38	January 14	@ Washington	W 84–75	Morris Peterson (21)	Jerome Williams (20)	Rafer Alston (11)	MCI Center; 20,173	10–28
39	January 15	Milwaukee	L 87–99	Morris Peterson (22)	Jerome Williams (17)	Rafer Alston, Antonio Davis (5)	Air Canada Centre; 18,357	10–29
40	January 17	@ New Jersey	L 77–88	Morris Peterson (20)	Jerome Williams (15)	Rafer Alston (8)	Continental Airlines Arena; 17,107	10–30
41	January 19	Orlando	L 93–101	Morris Peterson (25)	Jerome Williams (10)	Alvin Williams (9)	Air Canada Centre; 19,800	10–31
42	January 20	@ Minnesota	L 81–89	Voshon Lenard (22)	Jerome Williams (13)	Rafer Alston, Alvin Williams (5)	Target Center; 14,773	10–32
43	January 22	@ Indiana	L 98–101	Voshon Lenard (19)	Jerome Williams (14)	Alvin Williams (9)	Conseco Fieldhouse; 15,488	10–33
44	January 26	Sacramento	W 101–97	Vince Carter (22)	Jerome Williams (14)	Rafer Alston (7)	Air Canada Centre; 19,800	11–33
45	January 29	@ New Orleans	L 83–104	Voshon Lenard (16)	Antonio Davis (7)	Morris Peterson (6)	New Orleans Arena; 13,014	11–34
46	January 31	Indiana	W 102–90	Antonio Davis (20)	Antonio Davis, Jerome Williams (10)	Alvin Williams (7)	Air Canada Centre; 18,977	12–34

February: 5–4 (home: 4–2; road: 1–2)

Game	Date	Team	Score	High points	High rebounds	High assists	Location Attendance	Record
47	February 2	L.A. Clippers	W 100–86	Voshon Lenard (30)	Michael Bradley (11)	Alvin Williams (9)	Air Canada Centre; 17,862	13–34
48	February 4	@ Milwaukee	W 98–95	Vince Carter (25)	Antonio Davis (16)	Vince Carter (4)	Bradley Center; 13,765	14–34
49	February 12	Atlanta	W 97–96	Antonio Davis (22)	Jerome Williams (14)	Alvin Williams (7)	Air Canada Centre; 17,372	15–34
50	February 14	Golden State	L 114–118 (OT)	Voshon Lenard (26)	Antonio Davis (14)	Alvin Williams (10)	Air Canada Centre; 19,346	15–35
51	February 16	Orlando	W 99–97	Alvin Williams (22)	Antonio Davis (11)	Vince Carter, Voshon Lenard (5)	Air Canada Centre; 19,800	16–35
52	February 19	Detroit	L 84–89	Morris Peterson (20)	Jerome Williams (17)	Alvin Williams (9)	Air Canada Centre; 19,140	16–36
53	February 21	Phoenix	W 92–89	Antonio Davis (22)	Jerome Williams (13)	Alvin Williams (7)	Air Canada Centre; 18,695	17–36
54	February 26	@ Chicago	L 95–103	Voshon Lenard (20)	Jerome Williams (11)	Alvin Williams (9)	United Center; 18,178	17–37
55	February 28	@ Boston	L 85–90	Vince Carter (18)	Antonio Davis (14)	Rafer Alston (7)	FleetCenter; 18,624	17–38

March: 6–11 (home: 4–4; road: 2–7)

Game	Date	Team	Score	High points	High rebounds	High assists	Location Attendance	Record
56	March 2	Boston	W 104–92	Antonio Davis (19)	Michael Bradley (13)	Alvin Williams (6)	Air Canada Centre; 19,800	18–38
57	March 4	@ Washington	W 89–86	Vince Carter (24)	Michael Bradley, Jerome Williams (7)	Antonio Davis (5)	MCI Center; 20,173	19–38
58	March 5	Houston	L 95–97	Vince Carter (21)	Jerome Williams (10)	Antonio Davis (6)	Air Canada Centre; 20,171	19–39
59	March 8	@ Atlanta	W 107–98	Vince Carter (43)	Jerome Williams (15)	Antonio Davis (8)	Philips Arena; 19,445	20–39
60	March 9	Memphis	L 106–119	Vince Carter (26)	Antonio Davis (8)	Alvin Williams (9)	Air Canada Centre; 19,138	20–40
61	March 11	@ Denver	L 87–95	Vince Carter (21)	Michael Bradley (12)	Alvin Williams (6)	Pepsi Center; 13,409	20–41
62	March 12	@ Portland	L 103–125	Vince Carter (21)	Michael Bradley (10)	Rafer Alston (6)	Rose Garden; 19,991	20–42
63	March 14	@ Sacramento	L 84–119	Vince Carter, Morris Peterson (16)	Mamadou N'Diaye (10)	Rafer Alston (7)	ARCO Arena; 17,317	20–43
64	March 16	@ L.A. Clippers	L 110–111	Vince Carter (28)	Antonio Davis, Jerome Williams (8)	Alvin Williams (5)	Staples Center; 18,268	20–44
65	March 17	@ Phoenix	L 91–95 (OT)	Morris Peterson (17)	Antonio Davis (15)	Alvin Williams (7)	America West Arena; 15,326	20–45
66	March 19	Atlanta	W 87–86	Vince Carter (27)	Jerome Williams (10)	Alvin Williams (6)	Air Canada Centre; 17,885	21–45
67	March 21	@ Miami	L 98–107	Vince Carter (30)	Jerome Williams (9)	Alvin Williams (7)	American Airlines Arena; 14,492	21–46
68	March 23	Philadelphia	L 95–112	Vince Carter (22)	Antonio Davis (9)	Vince Carter (9)	Air Canada Centre; 19,800	21–47
69	March 24	@ New York	L 90–100	Antonio Davis (23)	Antonio Davis (12)	Alvin Williams (8)	Madison Square Garden; 18,824	21–48
70	March 26	Cleveland	W 89–83	Morris Peterson (21)	Jelani McCoy (8)	Rafer Alston (6)	Air Canada Centre; 16,832	22–48
71	March 28	New Orleans	L 92–101	Vince Carter (21)	Michael Bradley (11)	Alvin Williams (5)	Air Canada Centre; 18,773	22–49
72	March 30	New York	W 95–86	Vince Carter (28)	Michael Bradley (11)	Vince Carter (6)	Air Canada Centre; 19,800	23–49

April: 1–9 (home: 0–5; road: 1–4)

Game	Date	Team	Score	High points	High rebounds	High assists	Location Attendance	Record
73	April 1	Detroit	L 85–92	Voshon Lenard (21)	Michael Bradley, Jelani McCoy (14)	Alvin Williams (6)	Air Canada Centre; 18,237	23–50
74	April 2	@ Detroit	W 89–78	Vince Carter (18)	Jerome Williams (16)	Alvin Williams (6)	The Palace of Auburn Hills; 22,076	24–50
75	April 4	San Antonio	L 98–124	Vince Carter (17)	Michael Bradley (8)	Rafer Alston, Vince Carter, Morris Peterson (3)	Air Canada Centre; 18,376	24–51
76	April 6	New Jersey	L 87–96	Vince Carter (28)	Jelani McCoy (9)	Alvin Williams (8)	Air Canada Centre; 19,319	24–52
77	April 8	@ Miami	L 83–89	Alvin Williams (16)	Michael Bradley (8)	Morris Peterson (5)	American Airlines Arena; 14,365	24–53
78	April 9	@ Orlando	L 82–88	Alvin Williams (15)	Jerome Williams (10)	Rafer Alston (7)	TD Waterhouse Centre; 14,581	24–54
79	April 11	Milwaukee	L 103–105	Rafer Alston, Jerome Williams (20)	Jerome Williams (13)	Rafer Alston (8)	Air Canada Centre; 17,762	24–55
80	April 12	@ New Jersey	L 86–94	Morris Peterson (22)	Mamadou N'Diaye, Morris Peterson (8)	Rafer Alston (7)	Continental Airlines Arena; 5,306	24–56
81	April 15	Miami	L 99–103	Morris Peterson (33)	Jerome Williams (17)	Rafer Alston (8)	Air Canada Centre; 17,666	24–57
82	April 16	@ Cleveland	L 86–96	Rafer Alston (23)	Michael Bradley (10)	Rafer Alston (8)	Gund Arena; 20,251	24–58

2002–03 season schedule

== Player statistics ==
=== Ragular season ===
Player	POS	GP	GS	MP	REB	AST	STL	BLK	PTS	MPG	RPG	APG	SPG	BPG	PPG
Morris Peterson	SF	82	80	2,949	363	188	88	32	1,153	36.0	4.4	2.3	1.1	.4	14.1
Alvin Williams	PG	78	78	2,638	245	416	111	21	1,027	33.8	3.1	5.3	1.4	.3	13.2
Jerome Williams	PF	71	63	2,346	650	95	116	26	691	33.0	9.2	1.3	1.6	.4	9.7
Jelani McCoy	C	67	25	1,367	355	43	28	60	457	20.4	5.3	.6	.4	.9	6.8
Michael Bradley	PF	67	11	1,314	409	67	16	32	338	19.6	6.1	1.0	.2	.5	5.0
Voshon Lenard	SG	63	24	1,929	212	144	59	21	898	30.6	3.4	2.3	.9	.3	14.3
Antonio Davis	C	53	52	1,894	437	131	23	62	738	35.7	8.2	2.5	.4	1.2	13.9
Chris Jefferies	SF	51	10	666	59	22	19	16	197	13.1	1.2	.4	.4	.3	3.9
Rafer Alston	PG	47	4	980	107	192	38	15	366	20.9	2.3	4.1	.8	.3	7.8
Vince Carter	SG	43	42	1,471	188	143	48	41	884	34.2	4.4	3.3	1.1	1.0	20.6
Greg Foster	C	29	9	539	102	13	1	9	121	18.6	3.5	.4	.0	.3	4.2
Lindsey Hunter	PG	29	0	673	59	71	35	5	280	23.2	2.0	2.4	1.2	.2	9.7
Jermaine Jackson^{†}	SG	24	1	286	25	39	9	3	66	11.9	1.0	1.6	.4	.1	2.8
Mamadou N'Diaye	C	22	8	364	82	7	8	32	120	16.5	3.7	.3	.4	1.5	5.5
Maceo Baston	PF	16	0	106	23	0	4	11	40	6.6	1.4	.0	.3	.7	2.5
Art Long^{†}	PF	7	0	80	20	4	3	3	20	11.4	2.9	.6	.4	.4	2.9
Nate Huffman	C	7	0	76	23	5	1	3	23	10.9	3.3	.7	.1	.4	3.3
Damone Brown	PF	5	3	115	15	3	1	0	28	23.0	3.0	.6	.2	.0	5.6
Zendon Hamilton	C	3	0	12	4	0	1	0	6	4.0	1.3	.0	.3	.0	2.0

- ^{†} Denotes player spent time with another team in the season. Stats reflect time with the Raptors only.

== Award winners ==
- Vince Carter, NBA All-Star Game Appearance, Voted to start (Relinquished spot to a retiring Michael Jordan)
