= 2002–03 Atlanta Hawks season =

NBA professional basketball team season

- Head coach: Lon Kruger; Terry Stotts
- Arena: Philips Arena

Results
- Record: 35–47 (.427)
- Place: Division: 5th (Central); Conference: 11th (Eastern)
- Playoff finish: Did not qualify
- Stats at Basketball Reference

Local media
- Television: WUPA; Fox Sports Net South; Turner South
- Radio: WCNN

The 2002–03 Atlanta Hawks season was the 54th season for the Atlanta Hawks in the National Basketball Association, and their 35th season in Atlanta, Georgia. The city of Atlanta hosted the NBA All-Star weekend at the Philips Arena this season, which featured the 2003 NBA All-Star Game.

== Season summary ==
=== Off-season ===
During the off-season, the Hawks acquired All-Star forward Glenn Robinson from the Milwaukee Bucks, acquired rookie point guard Dan Dickau out of Gonzaga University from the Sacramento Kings, and signed free agent Darvin Ham. However, DerMarr Johnson suffered a broken neck from an off-season car accident in September. Johnson and two other passengers were in Johnson's car, when it crossed the center line, hit a tree and caught on fire; it was not known who was driving the car. Johnson would miss the entire regular season.

For the season, the Hawks slightly updated their white home uniforms and red road uniforms, replacing the jersey numbers on the left leg of their shorts with the team's primary logo; these uniforms would remain in use until 2007.

=== Regular season ===
With the addition of Robinson, and with Theo Ratliff playing in his first full season with the team after dealing with injuries, the Hawks got off to a 6–4 start to the regular season, which included a road win over the 3-time defending NBA champion Los Angeles Lakers, 95–83 at the Staples Center on November 12, 2002. However, after a 10–10 start to the season, the team struggled and fell below .500 in winning percentage, losing 12 of their next 14 games, as head coach Lon Kruger was fired after the team held an 11–16 record in late December, and was replaced with assistant coach Terry Stotts. Under Stotts, the Hawks lost 12 of their next 15 games, including two six-game losing streaks in December and January, and held a 19–30 record at the All-Star break. Despite winning six of their final eight games in April, the team finished in fifth place in the Central Division with a 35–47 record.

Robinson averaged 20.8 points, 6.6 rebounds and 1.3 steals per game, while Shareef Abdur-Rahim averaged 19.9 points and 8.4 rebounds per game, and Jason Terry provided the team with 17.2 points, 7.4 assists and 1.6 steals per game, and also led them with 160 three-point field goals. In addition, Dion Glover contributed 9.7 points per game, while Ratliff provided with 8.7 points, 7.5 rebounds and 3.2 blocks per game, and Ira Newble contributed 7.7 points per game. Off the bench, Alan Henderson averaged 4.8 points and 4.9 rebounds per game, and Nazr Mohammed provided with 4.6 points and 3.7 rebounds per game, but only played just 35 games due to injury.

Ratliff finished in ninth place in Defensive Player of the Year voting, while Glover finished tied in 26th place in Most Improved Player voting. The Hawks finished 28th in the NBA in home-game attendance, with an attendance of 528,655 at the Philips Arena during the regular season, which was the second-lowest in the league.

=== Aftermath ===
Following the season, Robinson was traded to the Philadelphia 76ers in a four-team trade, and after only one season with the Hawks, while Newble signed as a free agent with the Cleveland Cavaliers. Meanwhile, Ham signed with the Detroit Pistons, and Johnson and Emanual Davis were both released to free agency.

== Offseason ==
=== Draft picks ===
Round	Pick	Player	Position	Nationality	College
2	36	David Andersen	PF	Australia	

== Roster ==
2002–03 Atlanta Hawks roster
Players

Pos.	No.	Player	Height	Weight	DOB	From
F	3	Shareef Abdur-Rahim	6 ft 9 in (2.06 m)	225 lb (102 kg)		California
G	25	Corey Benjamin	6 ft 6 in (1.98 m)	200 lb (91 kg)		Oregon State
F	4	Chris Crawford (injured)	6 ft 9 in (2.06 m)	235 lb (107 kg)		Marquette
G	15	Emanual Davis (injured)	6 ft 4 in (1.93 m)	195 lb (88 kg)		Delaware State
G	12	Dan Dickau	6 ft 0 in (1.83 m)	190 lb (86 kg)		Gonzaga
G	5	Dion Glover	6 ft 5 in (1.96 m)	228 lb (103 kg)		Georgia Tech
F	8	Darvin Ham	6 ft 7 in (2.01 m)	220 lb (100 kg)		Texas Tech
F	44	Alan Henderson	6 ft 9 in (2.06 m)	235 lb (107 kg)		Indiana
G	6	Jermaine Jackson	6 ft 4 in (1.93 m)	204 lb (93 kg)		Detroit Mercy
G/F	1	DeMarr Johnson (injured) (IN)	6 ft 9 in (2.06 m)	201 lb (91 kg)		Cincinnati
C	2	Nazr Mohammed	6 ft 10 in (2.08 m)	221 lb (100 kg)		Kentucky
C	38	Mikki Moore	6 ft 11 in (2.11 m)	225 lb (102 kg)		Nebraska
G/F	14	Ira Newble	6 ft 7 in (2.01 m)	220 lb (100 kg)		Miami (OH)
F/C	42	Theo Ratliff	6 ft 10 in (2.08 m)	225 lb (102 kg)		Wyoming
F	13	Glenn Robinson	6 ft 7 in (2.01 m)	225 lb (102 kg)		Purdue
G	31	Jason Terry	6 ft 2 in (1.88 m)	185 lb (84 kg)		Arizona

Coaches
Head coach
- Terry Stotts
Assistant(s)
- Alex English
- Gar Heard
- Steve Henson

Legend
- (DP) Unsigned draft pick
- (FA) Free agent
- (S) Suspended
- (IN) Inactive
- Injured

Roster

=== Roster Notes ===
- Guard/forward DerMarr Johnson was on the injured reserve list due to a broken neck sustained from an off-season car accident, and missed the entire regular season.

== Regular season ==
=== Season standings ===
Central Division	W	L	PCT	GB	Home	Road	Div
y-Detroit Pistons	50	32	.610	–	30–11	20–21	19–9
x-Indiana Pacers	48	34	.585	2	32–9	16–25	19–9
x-New Orleans Hornets	47	35	.573	3	29–12	18–23	17–11
x-Milwaukee Bucks	42	40	.512	8	25–16	17–24	16–12
e-Atlanta Hawks	35	47	.427	15	26–15	9–32	14–14
e-Chicago Bulls	30	52	.366	20	27–14	3–38	12–16
e-Toronto Raptors	24	58	.293	26	15–26	9–32	10–18
e-Cleveland Cavaliers	17	65	.207	33	14–27	3–38	5–23

#	Eastern Conference				
#	Team	W	L	PCT	GB
1	c-Detroit Pistons	50	32	.610	–
2	y-New Jersey Nets	49	33	.598	1
3	x-Indiana Pacers	48	34	.585	2
4	x-Philadelphia 76ers	48	34	.585	2
5	x-New Orleans Hornets	47	35	.573	3
6	x-Boston Celtics	44	38	.537	6
7	x-Milwaukee Bucks	42	40	.512	8
8	x-Orlando Magic	42	40	.512	8
9	e-New York Knicks	37	45	.451	13
10	e-Washington Wizards	37	45	.451	13
11	e-Atlanta Hawks	35	47	.427	15
12	e-Chicago Bulls	30	52	.366	20
13	e-Miami Heat	25	57	.305	25
14	e-Toronto Raptors	24	58	.293	26
15	e-Cleveland Cavaliers	17	65	.207	33

z - clinched division title
y - clinched division title
x - clinched playoff spot

== Player statistics ==
Legend
GP	Games played	GS	Games started	MPG	Minutes per game
FG%	Field-goal percentage	3P%	3-point field-goal percentage	FT%	Free-throw percentage
RPG	Rebounds per game	APG	Assists per game	SPG	Steals per game
BPG	Blocks per game	PPG	Points per game

=== Season ===
Player	GP	GS	MPG	FG%	3P%	FT%	RPG	APG	SPG	BPG	PPG
Glenn Robinson	69	68	37.6	.432	.342	.876	6.6	3.0	1.3	0.4	20.8
Shareef Abdur-Rahim	81	81	38.1	.478	.350	.841	8.4	3.0	1.1	0.5	19.9
Jason Terry	81	81	38.0	.428	.371	.887	3.4	7.4	1.6	0.2	17.2
Dion Glover	76	42	24.9	.427	.354	.784	3.7	1.9	0.9	0.2	9.7
Theo Ratliff	81	81	31.1	.464	.000	.720	7.5	0.9	0.7	3.2	8.7
Ira Newble	73	45	26.5	.495	.381	.778	3.7	1.4	0.7	0.4	7.7
Mike Wilks	15	7	24.3	.358	.353	.724	2.7	2.8	1.1	0.1	5.7
Chris Crawford	5	0	7.6	.615	.333	.875	1.4	0.2	0.4	0.6	4.8
Alan Henderson	82	3	18.2	.468	.000	.638	4.9	0.5	0.4	0.4	4.8
Nazr Mohammed	35	0	12.7	.421	.000	.634	3.7	0.2	0.5	0.6	4.6
Corey Benjamin	9	0	16.9	.302	.154	.750	3.4	1.1	0.1	0.2	4.4
Emanual Davis	24	1	14.2	.364	.241	.773	1.8	1.5	0.5	0.0	3.7
Dan Dickau	50	0	10.3	.412	.361	.808	0.9	1.7	0.3	0.0	3.7
Mikki Moore	5	0	6.2	.417	.000	.800	1.4	0.6	0.0	0.4	3.6
Darvin Ham	75	1	12.3	.447	.000	.481	2.0	0.5	0.2	0.3	2.4
Jermaine Jackson	29	0	9.4	.452	.000	.607	1.1	1.2	0.3	0.1	1.9
Matt Maloney	14	0	7.4	.320	.333	.600	0.5	1.2	0.3	0.0	1.7
Antonio Harvey	4	0	8.0	.400	.000	.000	1.5	0.0	0.3	1.0	1.0
Amal McCaskill	11	0	6.4	.235	.000	.750	2.0	0.5	0.3	0.1	1.0
Brandon Williams	6	0	3.2	.143	.000	.000	0.3	0.0	0.3	0.0	0.3
Paul Shirley	2	0	2.5	.000	.000	.000	0.5	0.0	0.0	0.0	0.0

Player statistics citation:

== See also ==
- 2002-03 NBA season
