= Erick Strickland =

American basketball player (born 1973)

Personal information
- Born: November 25, 1973 (age 52) Opelika, Alabama, U.S.
- Listed height: 6 ft 3 in (1.91 m)
- Listed weight: 218 lb (99 kg)

Career information
- High school: Bellevue West (Bellevue, Nebraska)
- College: Nebraska (1992–1996)
- NBA draft: 1996: undrafted
- Playing career: 1996–2005
- Position: Point guard / shooting guard
- Number: 20, 21, 25

Career history
- 1996–2000: Dallas Mavericks
- 2000–2001: New York Knicks
- 2001: Vancouver Grizzlies
- 2001–2002: Boston Celtics
- 2002–2003: Indiana Pacers
- 2003–2005: Milwaukee Bucks

Career highlights
- Big Eight Freshman of the Year (1993); NIT Most Valuable Player (1996)

Career NBA statistics
- Points: 3,780 (7.5 ppg)
- Rebounds: 1,317 (2.6 rpg)
- Assists: 1,203 (2.4 apg)
- Stats at NBA.com
- Stats at Basketball Reference

Demerick Montae "Erick" Strickland (born November 25, 1973) is an American former professional basketball player who played in the National Basketball Association (NBA).

== Early life & college career ==
Born in Opelika, Alabama, Strickland attended Bellevue West High School in Bellevue, Nebraska, then played his college basketball career at the University of Nebraska–Lincoln. He was the 2nd all time scorer for Class A Nebraska basketball.

== Professional career ==
Strickland was undrafted in the 1996 NBA draft, but caught on as a free agent with the Dallas Mavericks, where he spent four seasons and averaged a career-high 12.8 points per game in 1999–2000. He later played for the New York Knicks, Vancouver Grizzlies, Boston Celtics, Indiana Pacers and Milwaukee Bucks, averaging 7.5 points per game throughout his nine-year NBA career.

Strickland also played two seasons of minor league baseball. He played in the Gulf Coast League with the Gulf Coast Marlins in 1992 and in the New York–Penn League with the Elmira Pioneers in 1993. Despite being a full two years younger than the average batter in his league in 1993, he led the Pioneers in triples and finished second in stolen bases and bases on balls.

== Career statistics ==
Legend
GP	Games played	GS	Games started	MPG	Minutes per game
FG%	Field goal percentage	3P%	3-point field goal percentage	FT%	Free throw percentage
RPG	Rebounds per game	APG	Assists per game	SPG	Steals per game
BPG	Blocks per game	PPG	Points per game	**Bold**	Career high

=== NBA ===
==== Regular season ====
Year	Team	GP	GS	MPG	FG%	3P%	FT%	RPG	APG	SPG	BPG	PPG
1996–97	Dallas	28	15	27.1	.398	.304	.813	3.2	2.4	1.0	**0.2**	10.6
1997–98	Dallas	67	19	22.5	.357	.294	.774	2.4	2.5	0.8	0.1	7.6
1998–99	Dallas	33	2	17.2	.403	.305	.815	2.5	1.9	1.2	0.1	7.5
1999–00	Dallas	68	**67**	**29.8**	**.433**	.392	.831	**4.8**	**3.1**	**1.5**	**0.2**	**12.8**
2000–01	New York	28	0	15.0	.305	.340	.857	1.9	1.0	0.8	0.0	4.3
2000–01	Vancouver	22	0	18.6	.301	.292	**.863**	3.5	3.0	1.0	0.0	6.4
2001–02	Boston	**79**	4	20.8	.389	.385	.845	2.7	2.3	0.7	0.0	7.7
2002–03	Indiana	71	10	18.0	.429	.388	.805	2.0	2.9	0.5	0.1	6.5
2003–04	Milwaukee	43	0	13.3	.403	**.439**	**.863**	1.7	2.1	0.6	0.0	5.4
2004–05	Milwaukee	62	5	16.4	.375	.253	.813	1.7	1.9	0.5	0.0	4.9
Career		501	122	20.3	.392	.351	.826	2.6	2.4	0.8	0.1	7.5

==== Playoffs ====
Year	Team	GP	GS	MPG	FG%	3P%	FT%	RPG	APG	SPG	BPG	PPG
2001–02	Boston	**12**	0	9.8	.282	**.200**	**1.000**	1.1	1.4	0.4	**0.1**	2.9
2002–03	Indiana	5	0	8.4	**.429**	**.200**	.800	1.4	1.6	0.2	0.0	4.2
2003–04	Milwaukee	3	0	**13.7**	.417	.000	**1.000**	**1.7**	**3.0**	**0.7**	0.0	**4.7**
Career		20	0	10.1	.338	.167	.913	1.3	1.7	0.4	0.1	3.5

=== College ===
Year	Team	GP	GS	MPG	FG%	3P%	FT%	RPG	APG	SPG	BPG	PPG
1992–93	Nebraska	31	6	17.2	**.454**	**.364**	.729	2.0	2.1	1.5	0.1	7.8
1993–94	Nebraska	30	13	22.4	.423	.350	.811	3.4	3.2	2.0	**0.4**	10.7
1994–95	Nebraska	31	31	30.4	.444	.338	.727	**5.4**	**4.3**	**2.9**	0.2	**16.3**
1995–96	Nebraska	**35**	**34**	**31.1**	.436	.351	**.823**	4.9	3.4	1.7	0.3	14.7
Career		127	84	25.5	.439	.349	.776	4.0	3.3	2.0	0.3	12.5
