= 2002–03 Indiana Pacers season =

NBA professional basketball team season

- Head coach: Isiah Thomas
- General manager: Donnie Walsh
- Arena: Conseco Fieldhouse

Results
- Record: 48–34 (.585)
- Place: Division: 2nd (Central); Conference: 3rd (Eastern)
- Playoff finish: First Round (lost to Celtics 2–4)
- Stats at Basketball Reference

Local media
- Television: Fox Sports Net Midwest, WTTV

The 2002–03 Indiana Pacers season was the 27th season for the Indiana Pacers in the National Basketball Association, and their 36th season as a franchise.

== Season summary ==
=== Off-season ===
The Pacers had the 14th overall pick in the 2002 NBA draft, and selected shooting guard Fred Jones from the University of Oregon. During the off-season, the team signed free agent Erick Strickland.

=== Regular season ===
Despite a few early-season injuries, the Pacers got off to a fast start by winning 14 of their first 16 games of the regular season, which included a nine-game winning streak in November, as the team held a 34–15 record at the All-Star break. However, the Pacers struggled and played below .500 in winning percentage for the remainder of the season, losing 12 of 13 games between February 16 and March 12, 2003, while posting two six-game losing streaks. In March, the team signed free agent, and former All-Star guard Tim Hardaway, who played in ten games for the Pacers. The Pacers finished in second place in the Central Division with a 48–34 record, and earned the third seed in the Eastern Conference; the team qualified for the NBA playoffs for the sixth consecutive year.

Jermaine O'Neal averaged 20.8 points, 10.3 rebounds and 2.3 blocks per game, and was named to the All-NBA Third Team, while Ron Artest averaged 15.5 points, 5.2 rebounds and 2.3 steals per game, and was named to the NBA All-Defensive Second Team, and Brad Miller provided the team with 13.1 points and 8.3 rebounds per game. In addition, Reggie Miller contributed 12.6 points per game, and led the Pacers with 113 three-point field goals, while sixth man Al Harrington provided with 12.2 points and 6.2 rebounds per game off the bench, and second-year guard Jamaal Tinsley averaged 7.8 points, 7.5 assists and 1.7 steals per game. Off the bench, Ron Mercer contributed 7.7 points per game, while Jonathan Bender averaged 6.6 points per game, Strickland provided with 6.5 points and 2.9 assists per game, and Austin Croshere contributed 5.1 points and 3.2 rebounds per game.

During the NBA All-Star weekend at the Philips Arena in Atlanta, Georgia, O'Neal and Brad Miller were both selected for the 2003 NBA All-Star Game, as members of the Eastern Conference All-Star team, while head coach Isiah Thomas was selected to coach the Eastern Conference; it was Miller's first ever All-Star appearance. The All-Star Game was also known as a storybook ending for retiring All-Star guard Michael Jordan of the Washington Wizards, but O'Neal ruined the moment, fouling Western Conference All-Star guard Kobe Bryant of the Los Angeles Lakers, who attempted a three-point shot; Bryant hit 2 of 3 free throws to send the game into overtime, as the Western Conference defeated the Eastern Conference, 155–145 in double-overtime. Meanwhile, Tinsley was selected for the NBA Rookie Challenge Game, as a member of the Sophomores team.

Artest finished in second place in Defensive Player of the Year voting, behind Ben Wallace of the Detroit Pistons, while Harrington finished in eighth place in Sixth Man of the Year voting; Artest also finished in 13th place in Most Improved Player voting, while O'Neal finished tied in 14 place, and Brad Miller finished tied in 18th place, and Thomas finished tied in 15th place in Coach of the Year voting. The Pacers finished 15th in the NBA in home-game attendance, with an attendance of 670,461 at the Conseco Fieldhouse during the regular season.

=== NBA playoffs ===
In the Eastern Conference First Round of the 2003 NBA playoffs, the Pacers faced off against the 6th–seeded Boston Celtics, a team that featured All-Star guard Paul Pierce, All-Star forward Antoine Walker, and Tony Delk. Despite having home-court advantage in the series, the Pacers struggled as the Celtics took a 3–1 series lead, after the Pacers lost Game 4 on the road, 102–92 at the FleetCenter. The Pacers managed to win Game 5 at home in overtime, 93–88 at the Conseco Fieldhouse, but then lost Game 6 to the Celtics at the FleetCenter, 110–90, thus losing the series in six games.

=== Notable highlights ===
One notable highlight of the regular season was the Pacers defeating the Chicago Bulls, 140–89 at the Conseco Fieldhouse on March 28, 2003.

=== Aftermath ===
Following the season, Thomas was fired after three seasons with the Pacers; he would later return to coach the New York Knicks in 2006. In a three-team trade, Brad Miller was traded to the Sacramento Kings, while Mercer was traded to the San Antonio Spurs. Meanwhile, Strickland signed as a free agent with the Milwaukee Bucks, and Hardaway retired after thirteen seasons in the NBA.

== Offseason ==
=== Draft picks ===
Round	Pick	Player	Position	Nationality	College
1	14	Fred Jones	SG	United States	Oregon

== Roster ==
2002–03 Indiana Pacers roster
Players

Pos.	No.	Player	Height	Weight	DOB	From
F	23	Ron Artest	6 ft 7 in (2.01 m)	244 lb (111 kg)	1979–11–13	St. John's
F	24	Jonathan Bender	6 ft 11 in (2.11 m)	202 lb (92 kg)	1981–01–30	Picayune Memorial HS (MS)
G	2	Jamison Brewer	6 ft 4 in (1.93 m)	184 lb (83 kg)	1980–11–19	Auburn
C	27	Primož Brezec	7 ft 2 in (2.18 m)	252 lb (114 kg)	1979–10–02	Slovenia
F	44	Austin Croshere	6 ft 9 in (2.06 m)	235 lb (107 kg)	1975–05–01	Providence
C	10	Jeff Foster	6 ft 11 in (2.11 m)	250 lb (113 kg)	1977–01–16	Texas State
G	14	Tim Hardaway	6 ft 0 in (1.83 m)	175 lb (79 kg)	1966–09–01	UTEP
F	3	Al Harrington	6 ft 9 in (2.06 m)	230 lb (104 kg)	1980–02–17	St. Patrick HS (NJ)
G	20	Fred Jones	6 ft 4 in (1.93 m)	210 lb (95 kg)	1979–03–11	Oregon
G/F	5	Ron Mercer	6 ft 7 in (2.01 m)	210 lb (95 kg)	1976–05–18	Kentucky
C	52	Brad Miller	6 ft 11 in (2.11 m)	244 lb (111 kg)	1976–04–12	Purdue
G/F	31	Reggie Miller	6 ft 7 in (2.01 m)	185 lb (84 kg)	1965–08–24	UCLA
F/C	7	Jermaine O'Neal	6 ft 11 in (2.11 m)	260 lb (118 kg)	1978–10–13	Eau Claire HS (SC)
G	21	Erick Strickland	6 ft 3 in (1.91 m)	210 lb (95 kg)	1973–11–25	Nebraska
G	11	Jamaal Tinsley	6 ft 3 in (1.91 m)	195 lb (88 kg)	1978–02–28	Iowa State

Coaches
Head coach
- Isiah Thomas
Assistant(s)
- Mark Aguirre
- Dan Burke
- Vern Fleming
- Brendan Malone
- Jim Staak

Legend
- (DP) Unsigned draft pick
- (FA) Free agent
- (S) Suspended
- Injured

Roster
Updated: 2012–10–10

== Regular season ==
=== Season standings ===
Central Division	W	L	PCT	GB	Home	Road	Div
y-Detroit Pistons	50	32	.610	–	30–11	20–21	19–9
x-Indiana Pacers	48	34	.585	2	32–9	16–25	19–9
x-New Orleans Hornets	47	35	.573	3	29–12	18–23	17–11
x-Milwaukee Bucks	42	40	.512	8	25–16	17–24	16–12
e-Atlanta Hawks	35	47	.427	15	26–15	9–32	14–14
e-Chicago Bulls	30	52	.366	20	27–14	3–38	12–16
e-Toronto Raptors	24	58	.293	26	15–26	9–32	10–18
e-Cleveland Cavaliers	17	65	.207	33	14–27	3–38	5–23

#	Eastern Conference				
#	Team	W	L	PCT	GB
1	c-Detroit Pistons	50	32	.610	–
2	y-New Jersey Nets	49	33	.598	1
3	x-Indiana Pacers	48	34	.585	2
4	x-Philadelphia 76ers	48	34	.585	2
5	x-New Orleans Hornets	47	35	.573	3
6	x-Boston Celtics	44	38	.537	6
7	x-Milwaukee Bucks	42	40	.512	8
8	x-Orlando Magic	42	40	.512	8
9	e-New York Knicks	37	45	.451	13
10	e-Washington Wizards	37	45	.451	13
11	e-Atlanta Hawks	35	47	.427	15
12	e-Chicago Bulls	30	52	.366	20
13	e-Miami Heat	25	57	.305	25
14	e-Toronto Raptors	24	58	.293	26
15	e-Cleveland Cavaliers	17	65	.207	33

z – clinched division title
y – clinched division title
x – clinched playoff spot

== Playoffs ==
2003 playoff game log
First round: 2–4 (home: 2–1; road: 0–3)

Game	Date	Team	Score	High points	High rebounds	High assists	Location Attendance	Series
1	April 19	Boston	L 100–103	Ron Artest (26)	Jermaine O'Neal (9)	Jamaal Tinsley (9)	Conseco Fieldhouse; 16,380	0–1
2	April 21	Boston	W 89–77	Jermaine O'Neal (23)	Jermaine O'Neal (20)	Jamaal Tinsley (7)	Conseco Fieldhouse; 15,881	1–1
3	April 24	@ Boston	L 83–101	Jermaine O'Neal (21)	Jermaine O'Neal (16)	Jamaal Tinsley (8)	FleetCenter; 18,624	1–2
4	April 27	@ Boston	L 92–102	Jermaine O'Neal (25)	Jermaine O'Neal (19)	Jamaal Tinsley (13)	FleetCenter; 18,624	1–3
5	April 29	Boston	W 93–88 (OT)	Ron Artest (26)	Jermaine O'Neal (22)	Tim Hardaway (6)	Conseco Fieldhouse; 15,326	2–3
6	May 1	@ Boston	L 90–110	Jermaine O'Neal (25)	Jermaine O'Neal (19)	Erick Strickland (5)	FleetCenter; 18,624	2–4

2003 schedule

== Player statistics ==
=== Regular season ===
Player	POS	GP	GS	MP	REB	AST	STL	BLK	PTS	MPG	RPG	APG	SPG	BPG	PPG
Al Harrington	SF	82	37	2,467	511	125	71	33	1,002	30.1	6.2	1.5	.9	.4	12.2
Jermaine O'Neal	PF	77	76	2,864	796	155	66	178	1,600	37.2	10.3	2.0	.9	2.3	20.8
Jeff Foster	C	77	2	802	279	51	28	21	162	10.4	3.6	.7	.4	.3	2.1
Brad Miller	C	73	72	2,270	603	193	65	43	955	31.1	8.3	2.6	.9	.6	13.1
Jamaal Tinsley	PG	73	69	2,237	260	548	125	18	566	30.6	3.6	7.5	1.7	.2	7.8
Ron Mercer	SG	72	3	1,671	154	112	49	14	556	23.2	2.1	1.6	.7	.2	7.7
Erick Strickland	SG	71	10	1,275	145	209	38	7	458	18.0	2.0	2.9	.5	.1	6.5
Reggie Miller	SG	70	70	2,117	172	170	62	4	882	30.2	2.5	2.4	.9	.1	12.6
Ron Artest	SF	69	67	2,317	362	198	159	50	1,068	33.6	5.2	2.9	2.3	.7	15.5
Austin Croshere	PF	49	0	633	155	56	6	13	252	12.9	3.2	1.1	.1	.3	5.1
Jonathan Bender	SF	46	2	819	133	42	8	56	303	17.8	2.9	.9	.2	1.2	6.6
Primož Brezec	C	22	1	111	23	4	2	4	42	5.0	1.0	.2	.1	.2	1.9
Fred Jones	SG	19	1	115	9	5	6	1	23	6.1	.5	.3	.3	.1	1.2
Tim Hardaway	PG	10	0	127	15	24	9	0	49	12.7	1.5	2.4	.9	.0	4.9
Jamison Brewer	PG	10	0	80	9	18	2	1	22	8.0	.9	1.8	.2	.1	2.2

=== Playoffs ===
Player	POS	GP	GS	MP	REB	AST	STL	BLK	PTS	MPG	RPG	APG	SPG	BPG	PPG
Jermaine O'Neal	PF	6	6	272	105	4	3	18	137	45.3	17.5	.7	.5	3.0	22.8
Ron Artest	SF	6	6	252	35	13	15	6	114	42.0	5.8	2.2	2.5	1.0	19.0
Jamaal Tinsley	PG	6	6	185	18	39	4	0	51	30.8	3.0	6.5	.7	.0	8.5
Reggie Miller	SG	6	6	176	14	14	1	1	55	29.3	2.3	2.3	.2	.2	9.2
Brad Miller	C	6	6	135	33	15	5	0	52	22.5	5.5	2.5	.8	.0	8.7
Ron Mercer	SG	6	0	135	13	7	6	1	39	22.5	2.2	1.2	1.0	.2	6.5
Al Harrington	SF	6	0	103	22	5	6	3	18	17.2	3.7	.8	1.0	.5	3.0
Jeff Foster	C	6	0	38	8	2	0	3	14	6.3	1.3	.3	.0	.5	2.3
Erick Strickland	SG	5	0	42	7	8	1	0	21	8.4	1.4	1.6	.2	.0	4.2
Tim Hardaway	PG	4	0	47	2	9	1	0	13	11.8	.5	2.3	.3	.0	3.3
Austin Croshere	PF	4	0	46	17	3	0	1	16	11.5	4.3	.8	.0	.3	4.0
Jonathan Bender	SF	3	0	34	7	0	0	2	17	11.3	2.3	.0	.0	.7	5.7

== Awards and records ==
- Isiah Thomas, List of NBA All-Star Game head coaches
- Jermaine O'Neal, NBA All-Star Game
- Brad Miller, NBA All-Star Game
- Jermaine O'Neal, All-NBA Third Team
- Ron Artest, NBA All-Defensive Second Team

== See also ==
- 2002–03 NBA season
