= Tamar Slay =

American basketball player and coach (born 1980)

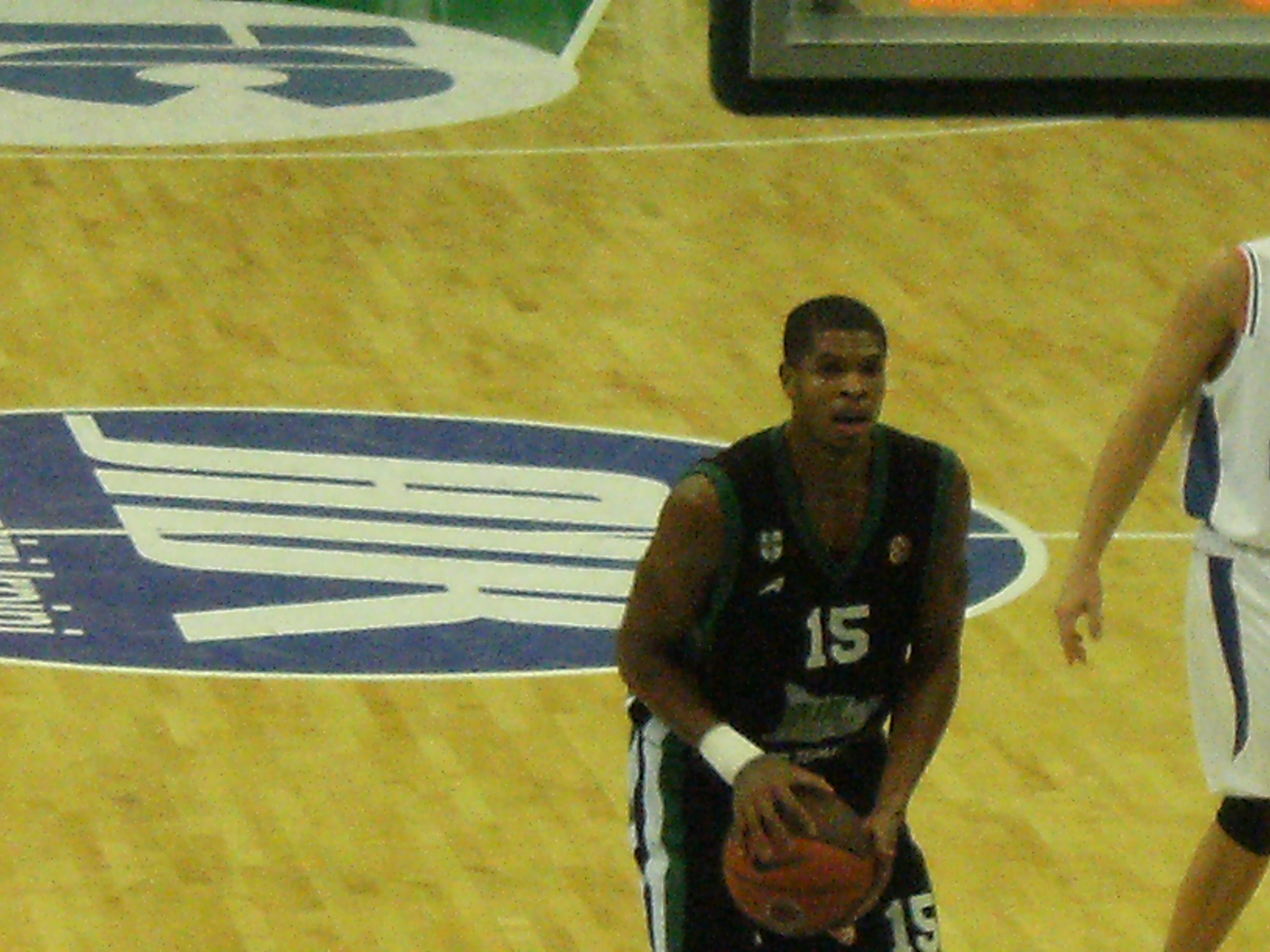
- Slay while playing in Italy

Personal information
- Born: April 2, 1980 (age 46) Beckley, West Virginia, U.S.
- Listed height: 6 ft 9 in (2.06 m)
- Listed weight: 220 lb (100 kg)

Career information
- High school: Woodrow Wilson (Beckley, West Virginia)
- College: Marshall (1998–2002)
- NBA draft: 2002: 2nd round, 54th overall pick
- Drafted by: New Jersey Nets
- Playing career: 2002–2014
- Position: Shooting guard
- Number: 15, 8, 32, 9
- Coaching career: 2022–present

Career history

Playing
- 2002–2004: New Jersey Nets
- 2004: Charlotte Bobcats
- 2005–2006: Hapoel Jerusalem
- 2007: Bakersfield Jam
- 2007–2008: Orlandina Basket
- 2008–2009: Air Avellino
- 2009–2010: Carmatic Pistoia
- 2010–2012: Umana Venezia
- 2012–2013: Sutor Montegranaro
- 2013–2014: Basket Brescia Leonessa

Career highlights
- Bill Evans Award (1998); First-team All-MAC (2000)
- Stats at NBA.com
- Stats at Basketball Reference

Tamar Ulysses Slay (born April 2, 1980) is an American former basketball player. A 6 ft 9 in (2.03 m) shooting guard, he was formerly with the National Basketball Association's New Jersey Nets and Charlotte Bobcats. He played college basketball for the Marshall Thundering Herd.

== High school and college ==
He graduated from Woodrow Wilson High School in Beckley, WV. He helped lead the school to state AAA basketball championships in 1997 and 1998, two of the five basketball state championships won by Woodrow Wilson High School in the 1990s. Afterwards, he attended Marshall University (Huntington, West Virginia). He was one of the team's most prominent players, averaging 15.7 points per game over his four-year college career.

== Professional career ==
=== NBA ===
Slay was the 54th overall pick in the 2002 NBA draft, selected by the New Jersey Nets. He spent two seasons with the Nets. He then played for the Charlotte Bobcats during the 2004–2005 season.

Slay's final NBA game was played on December 10, 2004, in a 106 - 115 loss to the Phoenix Suns where he recorded 8 points, 2 assists and 2 rebounds.

=== International ===
In 2005 Slay joined Israeli leading team Hapoel Jerusalem, but after an unstable season he was released in late December 2006. On January 4, 2007, he signed with the Bakersfield Jam of the NBA Development League. For the 2007–08 season, he returned overseas with Pierrel Capo d'Orlando. In July 2008, he signed with Air Avellino. In July 2009, he signed with Carmatic Pistoia. In August 2010 he signed with his third team in Italy, Umana Venezia. He joined Sutor Basket Montegranaro in August 2012. In August 2013, he signed a one-year deal with Basket Brescia Leonessa.

== Coaching career ==
In April 2022, Slay was hired by head coach Dan D'Antoni as an assistant coach at Marshall. He resigned from the position in May 2022, citing personal reasons.

== NBA career statistics ==
Legend
GP	Games played	GS	Games started	MPG	Minutes per game
FG%	Field goal percentage	3P%	3-point field goal percentage	FT%	Free throw percentage
RPG	Rebounds per game	APG	Assists per game	SPG	Steals per game
BPG	Blocks per game	PPG	Points per game	**Bold**	Career high

=== Regular season ===
Year	Team	GP	GS	MPG	FG%	3P%	FT%	RPG	APG	SPG	BPG	PPG
2002–03	New Jersey	**36**	0	7.6	**.379**	.280	**.700**	.9	.4	.4	**.1**	2.6
2003–04	New Jersey	22	0	7.5	.350	**.333**	.500	1.1	**.6**	.3	.0	2.4
2004–05	Charlotte	8	0	**9.8**	.333	.167	.000	**1.8**	.4	**.6**	.0	**3.5**
Career		66	0	7.8	.361	.265	.538	1.1	.5	.4	.1	2.6

=== Playoffs ===
Year	Team	GP	GS	MPG	FG%	3P%	FT%	RPG	APG	SPG	BPG	PPG
2003	New Jersey	**6**	0	1.8	**.250**	**1.000**	–	.0	.0	.0	.0	.5
2004	New Jersey	**6**	0	**2.0**	.200	.000	**1.000**	**.3**	.0	**.2**	.0	**.7**
Career		12	0	1.9	.222	.500	1.000	.2	.0	.1	.0	.6
