= 2002–03 Miami Heat season =

NBA professional basketball team season

- Head coach: Pat Riley
- President: Pat Riley
- General manager: Randy Pfund
- Owner: Micky Arison
- Arena: American Airlines Arena

Results
- Record: 25–57 (.305)
- Place: Division: 7th (Atlantic); Conference: 13th (Eastern)
- Playoff finish: Did not qualify
- Stats at Basketball Reference

Local media
- Television: Sunshine Network; WBFS; WFOR
- Radio: WIOD

The 2002–03 Miami Heat season was the 15th season for the Miami Heat in the National Basketball Association.

== Season summary ==
=== Off-season ===
The Heat received the tenth overall pick in the 2002 NBA draft, and selected small forward Caron Butler from the University of Connecticut. During the off-season, the team signed free agent Travis Best. However, due to the continuing effects of his kidney ailment, All-Star center Alonzo Mourning underwent a kidney transplant, and would miss the entire regular season.

=== Regular season ===
Without Mourning, and despite the addition of Caron Butler and Best, the Heat struggled losing 10 of their first 12 games of the regular season. After a 6–18 start to the season, the team won six of their next seven games, but then posted a six-game losing streak afterwards, and held a 17–32 record at the All-Star break. The Heat lost 18 of their final 23 games of the season, and finished in last place in the Atlantic Division with a 25–57 record, their worst since the 1990–91 season.

Eddie Jones averaged 18.5 points and 1.4 steals per game, but only played just 47 games due to a season-ending groin injury, while Caron Butler averaged 15.4 points, 5.1 rebounds and 1.8 steals per game, and was named to the NBA All-Rookie First Team, and Brian Grant provided the team with 10.3 points and 10.2 rebounds per game. In addition, second-year forward Malik Allen provided with 9.6 points and 5.3 rebounds per game, while Best contributed 8.4 points and 3.5 assists per game, and second-year guard Mike James contributed 7.8 points and 3.2 assists per game. Meanwhile, rookie small forward, and second-round draft pick Rasual Butler averaged 7.5 points per game, Eddie House contributed 7.5 points per game, Vladimir Stepania averaged 5.6 points and 7.0 rebounds per game, LaPhonso Ellis provided with 5.0 points and 2.9 rebounds per game, and Anthony Carter contributed 4.1 points and 4.1 assists per game.

During the NBA All-Star weekend at the Philips Arena in Atlanta, Georgia, Caron Butler was selected for the NBA Rookie Challenge Game, as a member of the Rookies team. Butler scored 23 points along with 7 assists, despite the Rookies losing to the Sophomores team, 132–112. Butler also finished in third place in Rookie of the Year voting. The Heat finished 22nd in the NBA in home-game attendance, with an attendance of 628,242 at the American Airlines Arena during the regular season.

=== Aftermath ===
Following the season, Mourning signed as a free agent with the New Jersey Nets after eight seasons with the Heat. Meanwhile, Best signed with the Dallas Mavericks, Ellis retired, and head coach Pat Riley resigned, although he would later on return to coach the Heat midway through the 2005–06 season.

== Offseason ==
=== Draft picks ===
Round	Pick	Player	Position	Nationality	School/Club team
1	10	Caron Butler	SF	United States	Connecticut
2	52	Rasual Butler	SG/SF	United States	La Salle

== Roster ==
2002–03 Miami Heat roster
Players

Pos.	No.	Player	Height	Weight	DOB	From
F	35	Malik Allen	6 ft 10 in (2.08 m)	255 lb (116 kg)	1978-06-27	Villanova
G	1	Travis Best	5 ft 11 in (1.80 m)	182 lb (83 kg)	1972-07-12	Georgia Tech
G/F	4	Caron Butler	6 ft 7 in (2.01 m)	217 lb (98 kg)	1980-03-13	Connecticut
G/F	45	Rasual Butler	6 ft 7 in (2.01 m)	205 lb (93 kg)	1979-06-23	La Salle
G	25	Anthony Carter	6 ft 1 in (1.85 m)	190 lb (86 kg)	1975-06-16	Hawaiʻi
F	3	LaPhonso Ellis	6 ft 8 in (2.03 m)	240 lb (109 kg)	1970-05-05	Notre Dame
F/C	44	Brian Grant	6 ft 9 in (2.06 m)	254 lb (115 kg)	1972-03-05	Xavier
G	5	Eddie House	6 ft 1 in (1.85 m)	180 lb (82 kg)	1978-05-14	Arizona State
G	7	Mike James	6 ft 2 in (1.88 m)	188 lb (85 kg)	1975-06-23	Duquesne
C	54	Ken Johnson	6 ft 11 in (2.11 m)	240 lb (109 kg)	1978-02-01	Ohio State
G/F	6	Eddie Jones	6 ft 6 in (1.98 m)	190 lb (86 kg)	1971-10-20	Temple
F	21	Sean Lampley	6 ft 7 in (2.01 m)	227 lb (103 kg)	1979-09-03	California
F/C	22	Sean Marks	6 ft 10 in (2.08 m)	250 lb (113 kg)	1975-08-23	California
C	33	Alonzo Mourning (injured) (IN)	6 ft 10 in (2.08 m)	240 lb (109 kg)	1970-02-08	Georgetown
C	50	Vladimir Stepania	7 ft 0 in (2.13 m)	236 lb (107 kg)	1976-05-08	Republic of Georgia

Coaches
Head coach
- Pat Riley
Assistant(s)
- Keith Askins
- Bill Foran
- Bob McAdoo
- Erik Spoelstra
- Stan Van Gundy

Legend
- (DP) Unsigned draft pick
- (FA) Free agent
- (S) Suspended
- Injured

Roster
Updated: September 5, 2002

=== Roster Notes ===
- Center Alonzo Mourning was on the injured reserve list due to a kidney transplant, and missed the entire regular season.

== Regular season ==
Atlantic Division	W	L	PCT	GB	Home	Road	Div
y-New Jersey Nets	49	33	.598	–	33–8	16–25	16–8
x-Philadelphia 76ers	48	34	.585	1	25–16	23–18	17–7
x-Boston Celtics	44	38	.537	5	25–16	19–22	13–12
x-Orlando Magic	42	40	.512	7	26–15	16–25	14–11
e-Washington Wizards	37	45	.451	12	23–18	14–27	11–13
e-New York Knicks	37	45	.451	12	24–17	13–28	9–15
e-Miami Heat	25	57	.305	24	16–25	9–32	5–19

#	Eastern Conference				
#	Team	W	L	PCT	GB
1	c-Detroit Pistons	50	32	.610	–
2	y-New Jersey Nets	49	33	.598	1
3	x-Indiana Pacers	48	34	.585	2
4	x-Philadelphia 76ers	48	34	.585	2
5	x-New Orleans Hornets	47	35	.573	3
6	x-Boston Celtics	44	38	.537	6
7	x-Milwaukee Bucks	42	40	.512	8
8	x-Orlando Magic	42	40	.512	8
9	e-New York Knicks	37	45	.451	13
10	e-Washington Wizards	37	45	.451	13
11	e-Atlanta Hawks	35	47	.427	15
12	e-Chicago Bulls	30	52	.366	20
13	e-Miami Heat	25	57	.305	25
14	e-Toronto Raptors	24	58	.293	26
15	e-Cleveland Cavaliers	17	65	.207	33

== Player statistics ==
=== Ragular season ===
Player	POS	GP	GS	MP	REB	AST	STL	BLK	PTS	MPG	RPG	APG	SPG	BPG	PPG
Brian Grant	C	82	82	2,641	837	104	63	47	846	32.2	10.2	1.3	.8	.6	10.3
Malik Allen	PF	80	73	2,318	425	54	37	78	767	29.0	5.3	.7	.5	1.0	9.6
Vladimir Stepania	C	79	6	1,594	554	24	45	40	441	20.2	7.0	.3	.6	.5	5.6
Caron Butler	SF	78	78	2,858	397	213	137	31	1,201	36.6	5.1	2.7	1.8	.4	15.4
Mike James	PG	78	8	1,722	149	246	64	5	607	22.1	1.9	3.2	.8	.1	7.8
Travis Best	PG	72	52	1,807	147	255	44	7	603	25.1	2.0	3.5	.6	.1	8.4
Rasual Butler	SG	72	28	1,514	186	93	21	43	540	21.0	2.6	1.3	.3	.6	7.5
Eddie House	SG	55	7	1,025	101	87	44	1	411	18.6	1.8	1.6	.8	.0	7.5
LaPhonso Ellis	PF	55	3	784	157	15	15	15	277	14.3	2.9	.3	.3	.3	5.0
Anthony Carter	PG	49	26	912	83	203	45	5	199	18.6	1.7	4.1	.9	.1	4.1
Eddie Jones	SG	47	47	1,789	226	173	64	31	869	38.1	4.8	3.7	1.4	.7	18.5
Sean Lampley	SF	35	0	487	83	31	7	3	169	13.9	2.4	.9	.2	.1	4.8
Sean Marks	PF	23	0	223	35	3	5	6	54	9.7	1.5	.1	.2	.3	2.3
Ken Johnson	C	16	0	156	32	0	1	12	32	9.8	2.0	.0	.1	.8	2.0

== Awards and records ==
Caron Butler, NBA All-Rookie Team 1st Team
