= 2002–03 Cleveland Cavaliers season =

NBA professional basketball team season

- Head coach: John Lucas (8–34); Keith Smart (9–31)
- Arena: Gund Arena

Results
- Record: 17–65 (.207)
- Place: Division: 8th (Central); Conference: 15th (Eastern)
- Playoff finish: Did not qualify
- Stats at Basketball Reference

Local media
- Television: Fox Sports Net Ohio · WUAB
- Radio: WTAM

The 2002–03 Cleveland Cavaliers season was the 33rd season for the Cleveland Cavaliers in the National Basketball Association.

== Season summary ==
=== Off-season ===
The Cavaliers received the sixth overall pick in the 2002 NBA draft, and selected shooting guard Dajuan Wagner from the University of Memphis; the team also selected power forward Carlos Boozer out of Duke University with the 34th overall pick. During the off-season, the team acquired Darius Miles from the Los Angeles Clippers, acquired Milt Palacio from the Phoenix Suns, and signed free agent, and undrafted rookie point guard Smush Parker.

=== Regular season ===
With the addition of Wagner, Boozer and Miles, the Cavaliers got off to a 2–2 start to the regular season, but then suffered a dreadful 15-game losing streak between November and December afterwards. Head coach John Lucas was fired after an 8–34 start to the season, and was replaced with assistant coach Keith Smart, as the team later on held a 10–40 record at the All-Star break. At mid-season, Tyrone Hill was released to free agency, and re-signed as a free agent with his former team, the Philadelphia 76ers, while Bimbo Coles was also released and signed with the Boston Celtics. The Cavaliers posted a seven-game losing streak between February and March, and finished in last place in the Central Division with a 17–65 record, which was tied for the worst record in the league along with the Denver Nuggets; it was also the team's worst record since the 1981–82 season. The Cavaliers also missed the NBA playoffs for the fifth consecutive year.

Ricky Davis showed improvement averaging 20.6 points, 5.5 assists and 1.6 steals per game, while Zydrunas Ilgauskas averaged 17.2 points, 7.5 rebounds and 1.9 blocks per game, and Wagner provided the team with 13.4 points per game, but only played just 47 games due to a knee injury. In addition, Boozer provided with 10.0 points and 7.5 rebounds per game, and was named to the NBA All-Rookie Second Team, while Jumaine Jones contributed 9.8 points and 5.1 rebounds per game, and led the Cavaliers with 111 three-point field goals, and Miles averaged 9.2 points and 5.4 rebounds per game. Meanwhile, Parker contributed 6.2 points and 2.5 assists per game, Chris Mihm averaged 5.9 points and 4.4 rebounds per game, and Palacio provided with 5.0 points and 3.2 assists per game.

During the NBA All-Star weekend at the Philips Arena in Atlanta, Georgia, Ilgauskas was selected for the 2003 NBA All-Star Game, as a member of the Eastern Conference All-Star team; it was his first ever All-Star appearance. Meanwhile, Wagner and Boozer were both selected for the NBA Rookie Challenge Game, as members of the Rookies team. Davis finished in fourth place in Most Improved Player voting, while Ilgauskas finished tied in 21st place, and Boozer finished in seventh place in Rookie of the Year voting.

The Cavaliers finished last in the NBA in home-game attendance, with an attendance of 471,374 at the Gund Arena during the regular season, which was 29th in the league.

=== Aftermath ===
Following the season, Jones was traded to the Boston Celtics, while Palacio signed as a free agent with the Toronto Raptors, and Smart was fired as head coach.

== Draft picks ==
Round	Pick	Player	Position	Nationality	College / Club Team
1	6	Dajuan Wagner	Guard	United States	Memphis
2	34	Carlos Boozer	Forward	United States	Duke

== Roster ==
Cleveland Cavaliers roster
Players

Pos.	No.	Player	Height	Weight	DOB	From
F	1	Carlos Boozer	6 ft 9 in (2.06 m)	258 lb (117 kg)		Duke
G	3	Tierre Brown	6 ft 2 in (1.88 m)	190 lb (86 kg)		McNeese State
G/F	31	Ricky Davis	6 ft 7 in (2.01 m)	195 lb (88 kg)		Iowa
C	52	DeSagana Diop	7 ft 0 in (2.13 m)	280 lb (127 kg)		Oak Hill Academy (VA)
C	11	**Žydrūnas** **Ilgauskas**	7 ft 3 in (2.21 m)	238 lb (108 kg)		Lithuania
F	33	Jumaine Jones	6 ft 8 in (2.03 m)	230 lb (104 kg)		Georgia
C	4	Chris Mihm	7 ft 0 in (2.13 m)	265 lb (120 kg)		Texas
F	21	Darius Miles	6 ft 9 in (2.06 m)	235 lb (107 kg)		East St. Louis HS (IL)
PG	10	Milt Palacio	6 ft 4 in (1.93 m)	210 lb (95 kg)		Colorado State
G	17	Smush Parker	6 ft 4 in (1.93 m)	190 lb (86 kg)		Fordham
F/C	13	Michael Stewart	6 ft 10 in (2.08 m)	230 lb (104 kg)		California
G	2	Dajuan Wagner	6 ft 2 in (1.88 m)	200 lb (91 kg)		Memphis

Coaches
**Head coach**
- John Lucas (Maryland)
**Assistant(s)**
- Mike Bratz (Stanford)
- Jerry Eaves (Louisville)
- Ron Ekker (Winona State)
- Clifford Ray (Oklahoma)
- Keith Smart (Indiana)

**Legend**
- **(DP)** Unsigned draft pick
- **(FA)** Free agent
- **(S)** Suspended
- Injured

Roster

=== Note ===
Bold = All-Star selection

== Regular season ==
=== Season standings ===
Central Division	W	L	PCT	GB	Home	Road	Div
y-Detroit Pistons	50	32	.610	–	30–11	20–21	19–9
x-Indiana Pacers	48	34	.585	2	32–9	16–25	19–9
x-New Orleans Hornets	47	35	.573	3	29–12	18–23	17–11
x-Milwaukee Bucks	42	40	.512	8	25–16	17–24	16–12
e-Atlanta Hawks	35	47	.427	15	26–15	9–32	14–14
e-Chicago Bulls	30	52	.366	20	27–14	3–38	12–16
e-Toronto Raptors	24	58	.293	26	15–26	9–32	10–18
e-Cleveland Cavaliers	17	65	.207	33	14–27	3–38	5–23

#	Eastern Conference				
#	Team	W	L	PCT	GB
1	c-Detroit Pistons	50	32	.610	–
2	y-New Jersey Nets	49	33	.598	1
3	x-Indiana Pacers	48	34	.585	2
4	x-Philadelphia 76ers	48	34	.585	2
5	x-New Orleans Hornets	47	35	.573	3
6	x-Boston Celtics	44	38	.537	6
7	x-Milwaukee Bucks	42	40	.512	8
8	x-Orlando Magic	42	40	.512	8
9	e-New York Knicks	37	45	.451	13
10	e-Washington Wizards	37	45	.451	13
11	e-Atlanta Hawks	35	47	.427	15
12	e-Chicago Bulls	30	52	.366	20
13	e-Miami Heat	25	57	.305	25
14	e-Toronto Raptors	24	58	.293	26
15	e-Cleveland Cavaliers	17	65	.207	33

=== Game log ===
==== October ====
Record: 1–1; Home: 0–0; Road: 1–1

#	Date	Visitor	Score	Home	OT	Leading scorer	Attendance	Record
1	29 October 2002	Cavaliers	67–94	Kings	NA	Ricky Davis (17)		0–1
2	30 October 2002	Cavaliers	98–96	Clippers	NA	Ricky Davis (25)		1–1

==== November ====
Record: 1–15; Home: 1–6; Road: 0–9

#	Date	Visitor	Score	Home	OT	Leading scorer	Attendance	Record
3	1 November 2002	Cavaliers	74–78	Suns	NA	Ricky Davis (21)		1–2
4	5 November 2002	Lakers	70–89	Cavaliers	NA	Ricky Davis (24)		2–2
5	6 November 2002	Cavaliers	100–107	Wizards	NA	Ricky Davis (27)		2–3
6	8 November 2002	Cavaliers	84–108	Sixers	NA	Ricky Davis (31)		2–4
7	9 November 2002	Wizards	93–79	Cavaliers	NA	Two-way tie (19)		2–5
8	12 November 2002	Cavaliers	75–95	Pacers	NA	Darius Miles (19)		2–6
9	13 November 2002	Mavericks	103–99	Cavaliers	NA	Zydrunas Ilgauskas (34)		2–7
10	16 November 2002	Spurs	90–77	Cavaliers	NA	Ricky Davis (22)		2–8
11	18 November 2002	Cavaliers	78–104	Spurs	NA	Zydrunas Ilgauskas (25)		2–9
12	19 November 2002	Cavaliers	80–97	Rockets	NA	Zydrunas Ilgauskas (24)		2–10
13	22 November 2002	Cavaliers	79–120	Nets	NA	Smush Parker (18)		2–11
14	23 November 2002	Hornets	97–84	Cavaliers	NA	Ricky Davis (24)		2–12
15	26 November 2002	Kings	91–85	Cavaliers	NA	Ricky Davis (22)		2–13
16	27 November 2002	Cavaliers	80–112	Bucks	NA	Ricky Davis (23)		2–14
17	29 November 2002	Sixers	106–99	Cavaliers	NA	Dajuan Wagner (29)		2–15
18	30 November 2002	Cavaliers	79–85	Heat	NA	Dajuan Wagner (28)		2–16

==== December ====
Record: 4–11; Home: 4–6; Road: 0–5

#	Date	Visitor	Score	Home	OT	Leading scorer	Attendance	Record
19	2 December 2002	Cavaliers	93–125	Knicks	NA	Dajuan Wagner (25)		2–17
20	4 December 2002	Bulls	101–111	Cavaliers	NA	Dajuan Wagner (29)		3–17
21	7 December 2002	Cavaliers	104–112	Bulls	NA	Zydrunas Ilgauskas (28)		3–18
22	9 December 2002	Bucks	140–133	Cavaliers	2	Ricky Davis (45)		3–19
23	11 December 2002	Raptors	83–96	Cavaliers	NA	Dajuan Wagner (33)		4–19
24	13 December 2002	Cavaliers	100–115	Celtics	NA	Ricky Davis (42)		4–20
25	14 December 2002	Nuggets	104–111	Cavaliers	NA	Two-way tie (29)		5–20
26	16 December 2002	SuperSonics	111–98	Cavaliers	NA	Ricky Davis (20)		5–21
27	18 December 2002	Pistons	111–106	Cavaliers	1	Zydrunas Ilgauskas (29)		5–22
28	20 December 2002	Cavaliers	107–109	Pistons	1	Ricky Davis (42)		5–23
29	21 December 2002	Celtics	89–82	Cavaliers	NA	Dajuan Wagner (25)		5–24
30	23 December 2002	Heat	72–74	Cavaliers	NA	Ricky Davis (33)		6–24
31	27 December 2002	Pacers	113–89	Cavaliers	NA	Zydrunas Ilgauskas (21)		6–25
32	29 December 2002	Suns	103–84	Cavaliers	NA	Ricky Davis (15)		6–26
33	30 December 2002	Cavaliers	88–102	Nets	NA	Ricky Davis (24)		6–27

==== January ====
Record: 3–11; Home: 1–3; Road: 2–8

#	Date	Visitor	Score	Home	OT	Leading scorer	Attendance	Record
34	3 January 2003	Cavaliers	81–80	Raptors	NA	Ricky Davis (29)		7–27
35	4 January 2003	Cavaliers	79–85	Bulls	NA	Zydrunas Ilgauskas (27)		7–28
36	6 January 2003	Bucks	106–94	Cavaliers	NA	Ricky Davis (22)		7–29
37	10 January 2003	Cavaliers	99–115	Lakers	NA	Ricky Davis (27)		7–30
38	12 January 2003	Cavaliers	87–79	SuperSonics	NA	Ricky Davis (22)		8–30
39	13 January 2003	Cavaliers	94–118	Trail Blazers	NA	Ricky Davis (17)		8–31
40	15 January 2003	Cavaliers	80–108	Warriors	NA	Ricky Davis (21)		8–32
41	17 January 2003	Cavaliers	80–97	Nuggets	NA	Zydrunas Ilgauskas (26)		8–33
42	18 January 2003	Cavaliers	78–95	Jazz	NA	Ricky Davis (25)		8–34
43	21 January 2003	Magic	103–94	Cavaliers	NA	Zydrunas Ilgauskas (35)		8–35
44	25 January 2003	Hawks	102–101	Cavaliers	1	Zydrunas Ilgauskas (19)		8–36
45	27 January 2003	Clippers	100–104	Cavaliers	NA	Ricky Davis (32)		9–36
46	29 January 2003	Cavaliers	108–113	Magic	NA	Zydrunas Ilgauskas (22)		9–37
47	31 January 2003	Cavaliers	91–96	Hawks	NA	Zydrunas Ilgauskas (21)		9–38

==== February ====
Record: 2–9; Home: 2–5; Road: 0–4

#	Date	Visitor	Score	Home	OT	Leading scorer	Attendance	Record
48	2 February 2003	Trail Blazers	114–95	Cavaliers	NA	Zydrunas Ilgauskas (20)		9–39
49	4 February 2003	Cavaliers	84–93	Wizards	NA	Dajuan Wagner (19)		9–40
50	5 February 2003	Rockets	102–105	Cavaliers	NA	Ricky Davis (21)		10–40
51	11 February 2003	Cavaliers	96–107	Pacers	NA	Jumaine Jones (25)		10–41
52	12 February 2003	Timberwolves	102–91	Cavaliers	NA	Ricky Davis (26)		10–42
53	16 February 2003	Pistons	90–75	Cavaliers	NA	Ricky Davis (19)		10–43
54	18 February 2003	Bulls	107–101	Cavaliers	NA	Carlos Boozer (23)		10–44
55	21 February 2003	Sixers	119–99	Cavaliers	NA	Zydrunas Ilgauskas (19)		10–45
56	23 February 2003	Cavaliers	103–116	Sixers	NA	Dajuan Wagner (23)		10–46
57	25 February 2003	Nets	90–93	Cavaliers	NA	Zydrunas Ilgauskas (29)		11–46
58	28 February 2003	Cavaliers	95–118	Timberwolves	NA	Two-way tie (16)		11–47

==== March ====
Record: 3–12; Home: 3–5; Road: 0–7

#	Date	Visitor	Score	Home	OT	Leading scorer	Attendance	Record
59	2 March 2003	Magic	102–76	Cavaliers	NA	Two-way tie (14)		11–48
60	4 March 2003	Cavaliers	80–89	Knicks	NA	Ricky Davis (24)		11–49
61	5 March 2003	Hawks	111–105	Cavaliers	NA	Zydrunas Ilgauskas (27)		11–50
62	7 March 2003	Cavaliers	76–102	Hornets	NA	Carlos Boozer (16)		11–51
63	8 March 2003	Grizzlies	115–89	Cavaliers	NA	Ricky Davis (18)		11–52
64	11 March 2003	Heat	77–75	Cavaliers	NA	Ricky Davis (19)		11–53
65	16 March 2003	Jazz	95–122	Cavaliers	NA	Ricky Davis (28)		12–53
66	18 March 2003	Cavaliers	93–114	Mavericks	NA	Zydrunas Ilgauskas (30)		12–54
67	19 March 2003	Cavaliers	101–128	Grizzlies	NA	Carlos Boozer (27)		12–55
68	21 March 2003	Cavaliers	85–109	Magic	NA	Milt Palacio (15)		12–56
69	23 March 2003	Nets	88–93	Cavaliers	NA	Zydrunas Ilgauskas (29)		13–56
70	25 March 2003	Warriors	103–124	Cavaliers	NA	Ricky Davis (28)		14–56
71	26 March 2003	Cavaliers	83–89	Raptors	NA	Zydrunas Ilgauskas (25)		14–57
72	28 March 2003	Cavaliers	95–104	Celtics	NA	Ricky Davis (31)		14–58
73	29 March 2003	Celtics	110–106	Cavaliers	NA	Ricky Davis (38)		14–59

==== April ====
Record: 3–6; Home: 3–2; Road: 0–4

#	Date	Visitor	Score	Home	OT	Leading scorer	Attendance	Record
74	2 April 2003	Pacers	103–82	Cavaliers	NA	Ricky Davis (27)		14–60
75	4 April 2003	Cavaliers	93–95	Bucks	NA	Ricky Davis (26)		14–61
76	5 April 2003	Hornets	76–79	Cavaliers	NA	Ricky Davis (17)		15–61
77	8 April 2003	Wizards	100–91	Cavaliers	NA	Zydrunas Ilgauskas (23)		15–62
78	9 April 2003	Cavaliers	81–100	Hornets	NA	Jumaine Jones (21)		15–63
79	11 April 2003	Cavaliers	89–109	Hawks	NA	Tierre Brown (15)		15–64
80	12 April 2003	Knicks	99–104	Cavaliers	1	Ricky Davis (37)		16–64
81	14 April 2003	Cavaliers	88–89	Pistons	NA	Ricky Davis (25)		16–65
82	16 April 2003	Raptors	86–96	Cavaliers	NA	Smush Parker (17)		17–65

- Green background indicates win.
- Red background indicates loss.

== Player stats ==
Legend
GP	Games played	GS	Games started	MPG	Minutes per game
FG%	Field-goal percentage	3P%	3-point field-goal percentage	FT%	Free-throw percentage
RPG	Rebounds per game	APG	Assists per game	SPG	Steals per game
BPG	Blocks per game	PPG	Points per game

=== Regular season ===
Player	GP	GS	MPG	FG%	3P%	FT%	RPG	APG	SPG	BPG	PPG
Carlos Boozer	81	54	25.3	.536	.000	.771	7.5	1.3	.73	.62	10.0
Tierre Brown	15	0	11.2	.458	.000	.786	2.0	2.6	.87	.00	4.3
Ricky Davis	79	76	39.6	.410	.363	.748	4.9	5.5	1.58	.46	20.6
DeSagana Diop	80	1	11.8	.351	.000	.367	2.7	.5	.41	1.01	1.5
Žydrūnas Ilgauskas	81	81	30.0	.441	.000	.781	7.5	1.6	.69	1.88	17.2
Jumaine Jones	80	12	27.6	.434	.354	.687	5.1	1.4	.84	.28	9.8
Chris Mihm	52	0	15.6	.404	.000	.724	4.4	.5	.35	.73	5.9
Darius Miles	67	62	30.0	.410	.000	.594	5.4	2.6	1.00	1.03	9.2
Milt Palacio	80	46	24.7	.418	.216	.747	2.9	3.2	.85	.20	5.0
Smush Parker	66	18	16.7	.402	.322	.831	1.8	2.5	.73	.18	6.2
Michael Stewart	47	0	5.3	.378	.000	.667	1.2	.1	.04	.32	.8
Dajuan Wagner	47	24	29.5	.369	.316	.800	1.7	2.8	.81	.15	13.4

Player statistics citation:
