= 2002–03 New York Knicks season =

Season of National Basketball Association team the New York Knicks

- Head coach: Don Chaney
- General manager: Scott Layden
- Owners: Cablevision
- Arena: Madison Square Garden

Results
- Record: 37–45 (.451)
- Place: Division: 6th (Atlantic); Conference: 10th (Eastern)
- Playoff finish: Did not qualify
- Stats at Basketball Reference

Local media
- Television: MSG Network
- Radio: WFAN

The 2002–03 New York Knicks season was the 57th season for the New York Knicks in the National Basketball Association.

== Season summary ==
=== Off-season ===
After missing the NBA playoffs for the first time in 15 years, the Knicks received the seventh overall pick in the 2002 NBA draft, and selected Brazilian power forward Nenê Hilario; however, the team soon traded Hilario to the Denver Nuggets in exchange for All-Star forward Antonio McDyess on draft day. However, prior to the regular season, McDyess underwent knee surgery and was lost for the entire season. Meanwhile, Latrell Sprewell showed up to training camp with a broken hand, and was fined $250,000. During the off-season, the team signed free agent Michael Doleac.

=== Regular season ===
In Don Chaney's first full season as their head coach, the Knicks lost ten of their first twelve games, but then won 10 of their next 17 games afterwards, and later on held a 21–27 record at the All-Star break. The team won five of their final eight games of the season in April, and finished in sixth place in the Atlantic Division with a 37–45 record, which was a seven-game improvement over their previous season; however, the Knicks missed the NBA playoffs for the second consecutive year.

Allan Houston led the Knicks with 22.5 points per game and 178 three-point field goals, while Sprewell averaged 16.4 points, 4.5 assists and 1.4 steals per game, and also contributed 134 three-point field goals, and Kurt Thomas provided the team with 14.0 points and 7.9 rebounds per game. In addition, Howard Eisley contributed 9.1 points and 5.4 assists per game, along with 131 three-point field goals, while Shandon Anderson provided with 8.4 points per game, and Othella Harrington averaged 7.7 points and 6.4 rebounds per game. Meanwhile, Charlie Ward contributed 7.2 points, 4.6 assists and 1.2 steals per game, along with 101 three-point field goals, Clarence Weatherspoon averaged 6.6 points and 7.6 rebounds per game, and Doleac provided the Knicks with 4.4 points and 2.9 rebounds per game.

The Knicks finished eighth in the NBA in home-game attendance, with an attendance of 779,479 at Madison Square Garden during the regular season.

=== Notable highlights ===
One notable highlight of the regular season occurred on February 4, 2003, in a home game against the Los Angeles Clippers at Madison Square Garden. Sprewell scored 38 points, and made each of his nine three-point field-goal attempts, as the Knicks defeated the Clippers, 105–92; his performance set an NBA single-game record for the most three-pointers made without missing a three-point attempt.

=== Aftermath ===
Following the season, Sprewell was traded to the Minnesota Timberwolves in a four-team trade after five seasons with the Knicks.

== NBA draft ==
Round	Pick	Player	Position	Nationality	School/Club team
1	7	Nenê Hilario	PF	Brazil	Vasco da Gama {Brazil)
2	36	Miloš Vujanić	G	FR Yugoslavia	Partizan Belgrade

== Roster ==
2002–03 New York Knicks roster
Players

Pos.	No.	Player	Height	Weight	DOB	From
G/F	49	Shandon Anderson	6 ft 6 in (1.98 m)	208 lb (94 kg)	1973–12–31	Georgia
C	51	Michael Doleac	6 ft 11 in (2.11 m)	262 lb (119 kg)	1977–06–15	Utah
G	4	Howard Eisley	6 ft 2 in (1.88 m)	177 lb (80 kg)	1972–12–04	Boston College
F/C	32	Othella Harrington (injured)	6 ft 9 in (2.06 m)	235 lb (107 kg)	1974–01–31	Georgetown
G	20	Allan Houston	6 ft 6 in (1.98 m)	200 lb (91 kg)	1971–04–20	Tennessee
C	44	Travis Knight	7 ft 0 in (2.13 m)	235 lb (107 kg)	1974–09–13	Connecticut
F	34	Antonio McDyess (injured) (IN)	6 ft 9 in (2.06 m)	220 lb (100 kg)	1974–09–07	Alabama
F	54	Lee Nailon	6 ft 9 in (2.06 m)	238 lb (108 kg)	1975–02–22	TCU
G	7	Lavor Postell	6 ft 5 in (1.96 m)	215 lb (98 kg)	1978–02–26	St. John's
G/F	8	Latrell Sprewell	6 ft 5 in (1.96 m)	190 lb (86 kg)	1970–09–08	Alabama
F/C	40	Kurt Thomas	6 ft 9 in (2.06 m)	230 lb (104 kg)	1972–10–04	TCU
G	21	Charlie Ward	6 ft 2 in (1.88 m)	190 lb (86 kg)	1970–10–12	Florida State
F	35	Clarence Weatherspoon	6 ft 6 in (1.98 m)	240 lb (109 kg)	1970–09–08	Southern Miss
G	30	Frank Williams	6 ft 3 in (1.91 m)	212 lb (96 kg)	1980–02–25	Illinois

Coaches
Head coach
- Don Chaney
Assistant(s)
- Greg Brittenham
- Steve Clifford
- Andy Greer
- Tom Thibodeau
- Herb Williams

Legend
- (DP) Unsigned draft pick
- (FA) Free agent
- (S) Suspended
- (IN) Inactive
- Injured

Roster
Updated: October 30, 2002

=== Roster notes ===
- Power forward Antonio McDyess was on the injured reserve list due to a knee injury, and missed the entire regular season.

== Regular season ==
Atlantic Division	W	L	PCT	GB	Home	Road	Div
y-New Jersey Nets	49	33	.598	–	33–8	16–25	16–8
x-Philadelphia 76ers	48	34	.585	1	25–16	23–18	17–7
x-Boston Celtics	44	38	.537	5	25–16	19–22	13–12
x-Orlando Magic	42	40	.512	7	26–15	16–25	14–11
e-Washington Wizards	37	45	.451	12	23–18	14–27	11–13
e-New York Knicks	37	45	.451	12	24–17	13–28	9–15
e-Miami Heat	25	57	.305	24	16–25	9–32	5–19

#	Eastern Conference				
#	Team	W	L	PCT	GB
1	c-Detroit Pistons	50	32	.610	–
2	y-New Jersey Nets	49	33	.598	1
3	x-Indiana Pacers	48	34	.585	2
4	x-Philadelphia 76ers	48	34	.585	2
5	x-New Orleans Hornets	47	35	.573	3
6	x-Boston Celtics	44	38	.537	6
7	x-Milwaukee Bucks	42	40	.512	8
8	x-Orlando Magic	42	40	.512	8
9	e-New York Knicks	37	45	.451	13
10	e-Washington Wizards	37	45	.451	13
11	e-Atlanta Hawks	35	47	.427	15
12	e-Chicago Bulls	30	52	.366	20
13	e-Miami Heat	25	57	.305	25
14	e-Toronto Raptors	24	58	.293	26
15	e-Cleveland Cavaliers	17	65	.207	33

== Player statistics ==
Legend
GP	Games played	GS	Games started	MPG	Minutes per game
FG%	Field-goal percentage	3P%	3-point field-goal percentage	FT%	Free-throw percentage
RPG	Rebounds per game	APG	Assists per game	SPG	Steals per game
BPG	Blocks per game	PPG	Points per game

=== Regular season ===
Player	GP	GS	MPG	FG%	3P%	FT%	RPG	APG	SPG	BPG	PPG
Shandon Anderson	82	9	21.1	.462	.371	.732	3.1	1.1	.9	.2	8.4
Michael Doleac	75	0	13.9	.426		.783	2.9	.6	.2	.2	4.4
Howard Eisley	82	76	27.4	.417	.389	.848	2.3	5.4	.9	.1	9.1
Othella Harrington	74	64	25.0	.508		.820	6.4	.8	.2	.3	7.7
Allan Houston	82	82	37.9	.445	.396	.919	2.8	2.7	.7	.1	22.5
Travis Knight	32	0	9.0	.385	.000	.769	1.9	.4	.3	.3	1.9
Lee Nailon	38	0	10.7	.442	.000	.824	1.8	.7	.2	.1	5.5
Lavor Postell	12	0	8.2	.368	.286	.867	.3	.3	.2	.0	3.6
Latrell Sprewell	74	73	38.6	.403	.372	.794	3.9	4.5	1.4	.3	16.4
Kurt Thomas	81	81	31.8	.483	.667	.750	7.9	2.0	1.0	1.2	14.0
Charlie Ward	66	6	22.2	.399	.378	.774	2.7	4.6	1.2	.2	7.2
Clarence Weatherspoon	79	19	25.6	.449		.768	7.6	.9	.9	.5	6.6
Frank Williams	21	0	8.0	.273	.375	.667	.9	1.6	.3	.1	1.3

Player statistics citation:

== Transactions ==
=== Trades ===
August 2, 2002

To New York Knicks—
- Antonio McDyess
- Frank Williams
- 2003 2nd round pick (Maciej Lampe)
To Denver Nuggets—
- Marcus Camby
- Nenê
- Mark Jackson

=== Free agents ===
Additions
Player	Date signed	Former team
Michael Doleac	August 7	Cleveland Cavaliers
Mark Pope	September 30	Milwaukee Bucks
Lee Nailon	October 30	Charlotte Hornets
