= 2002–03 Chicago Bulls season =

NBA professional basketball team season

- Head coach: Bill Cartwright
- General manager: Jerry Krause
- Owners: Jerry Reinsdorf
- Arena: United Center

Results
- Record: 30–52 (.366)
- Place: Division: 6th (Central); Conference: 12th (Eastern)
- Playoff finish: Did not qualify
- Stats at Basketball Reference

Local media
- Television: Fox Sports Net Chicago, WGN, WCIU
- Radio: WMVP

The 2002–03 Chicago Bulls season was the 37th season for the Chicago Bulls in the National Basketball Association.

== Season summary ==
=== Off-season ===
The Bulls received the second overall pick in the 2002 NBA draft, and selected point guard Jay Williams out of Duke University. During the off-season, the team signed free agents Donyell Marshall, and former Bulls forward Corie Blount.

=== Regular season ===
With the addition of Williams and Marshall, the Bulls got off to a 4–6 start to the regular season, but then posted a nine-game losing streak between November and December. However, the team won six of their next eight games, and later on held a 17–32 record at the All-Star break. The Bulls posted an 8-game losing streak between January and February, but won four of their final six games of the season, finishing in sixth place in the Central Division with a 30–52 record, and missing the NBA playoffs for the fifth consecutive year. The team posted a 27–14 home record at the United Center, but struggled posting a franchise worst road record at 3–38 during the regular season.

Jalen Rose averaged 22.1 points and 4.8 assists per game, and led the Bulls with 133 three-point field goals, while Marshall averaged 13.4 points and 9.0 rebounds per game, and Marcus Fizer provided the team with 11.7 points and 5.7 rebounds per game. In addition, Jamal Crawford contributed 10.7 points and 4.2 assists per game, while second-year center Eddy Curry provided with 10.5 points and 4.4 rebounds per game, and Williams contributed 9.5 points and 4.7 assists per game, and was named to the NBA All-Rookie Second Team. Meanwhile, second-year center Tyson Chandler averaged 9.2 points, 6.9 rebounds and 1.4 blocks per game, Eddie Robinson contributed 5.7 points per game, rookie power forward, and second-round draft pick Lonny Baxter provided with 4.8 points and 3.0 rebounds per game, second-year guard Trenton Hassell contributed 4.2 points per game, and Blount averaged 3.0 points and 4.1 rebounds per game.

During the NBA All-Star weekend at the Philips Arena in Atlanta, Georgia, Williams and Chandler were both selected for the NBA Rookie Challenge Game, as Williams was a member of the Rookies team, while Chandler was a member of the Sophomores team. The Bulls finished fifth in the NBA in home-game attendance, with an attendance of 804,309 at the United Center during the regular season.

=== Aftermath ===
Following the season, Williams suffered a career-ending motorcycle accident after only one season with the Bulls, while Hassell and Fred Hoiberg both signed as free agents with the Minnesota Timberwolves. (See 2002–03 Chicago Bulls season#Regular season)

== NBA draft ==
Round	Pick	Player	Position	Nationality	College / Club Team
1	2	Jay Williams	PG	United States	Duke
2	31	Roger Mason, Jr.	SG	United States	Virginia
2	44	Lonny Baxter	PF	United States	Maryland

== Roster ==
2002–03 Chicago Bulls roster
Players

Pos.	No.	Player	Height	Weight	DOB	From
C	11	Dalibor Bagaric	7 ft 1 in (2.16 m)	255 lb (116 kg)	1980-02-07	Croatia
F/C	35	Lonny Baxter	6 ft 8 in (2.03 m)	260 lb (118 kg)	1979-01-27	Maryland
F/C	43	Corie Blount	6 ft 9 in (2.06 m)	240 lb (109 kg)	1969-01-04	Cincinnati
G	9	Rick Brunson	6 ft 4 in (1.93 m)	190 lb (86 kg)	1972-06-14	Temple
F/C	3	Tyson Chandler (injured)	7 ft 1 in (2.16 m)	235 lb (107 kg)	1982-10-02	Dominguez HS (CA)
G	1	Jamal Crawford	6 ft 6 in (1.98 m)	185 lb (84 kg)	1980-03-20	Michigan
C	2	Eddy Curry	6 ft 11 in (2.11 m)	285 lb (129 kg)	1982-12-05	Thornwood HS (IL)
F	21	Marcus Fizer (injured)	6 ft 9 in (2.06 m)	262 lb (119 kg)	1978-08-10	Iowa State
G	44	Trenton Hassell	6 ft 5 in (1.96 m)	200 lb (91 kg)	1979-03-04	Austin Peay
G	20	Fred Hoiberg	6 ft 4 in (1.93 m)	203 lb (92 kg)	1972-10-15	Iowa State
F	42	Donyell Marshall (injured)	6 ft 9 in (2.06 m)	218 lb (99 kg)	1973-05-18	Connecticut
G/F	31	Roger Mason	6 ft 5 in (1.96 m)	200 lb (91 kg)	1980-09-10	Virginia
F	32	Eddie Robinson	6 ft 8 in (2.03 m)	210 lb (95 kg)	1976-04-19	Central Oklahoma
G/F	5	Jalen Rose	6 ft 8 in (2.03 m)	210 lb (95 kg)	1973-01-30	Michigan
G	22	Jay Williams	6 ft 2 in (1.88 m)	195 lb (88 kg)	1981-09-10	Duke

Coaches
Head coach
- Bill Cartwright
Assistant(s)
- Bill Berry
- Pete Myers
- Bob Thornton
- Mike Wilhelm
- Fred Tedeschi (trainer)

Legend
- (DP) Unsigned draft pick
- (FA) Free agent
- (S) Suspended
- Injured

Roster
Updated: September 18, 2002

== Regular season ==
The Bulls entered the 2002-03 NBA season with an eager sense of anticipation on what the prior year's moves would become.

Jalen Rose was expected to have a big year in his first full season with the club. Jay Williams, selected by the Bulls with the second overall pick in 2002 NBA draft, was expected to provide the team with an extra scoring punch. The team's two young big men, Tyson Chandler and Eddy Curry, each had a year of pro experience.

General Manager Jerry Krause in addition to Williams also added Roger Mason, Jr. and Lonny Baxter via the draft. Veteran forward Donyell Marshall—signed with the team's mid-level exception.

In the end, though, having Rose, Marshall and an abundance of talented youth did not equate to winning games. After starting the season 2–0 for the first time since the 1996–97 campaign, Chicago garnered a franchise-worst 3–38 road record. The Bulls held a 19–game road losing streak from 11/02/02–01/18/03 and the team's 30–52 record qualified it for a fifth–consecutive NBA Draft Lottery appearance.

The franchise was ready to head in a new direction and the beginning of that movement started with the resignation of long–time executive Jerry Krause on April 7. Krause, then 64, played a major role in building Bulls World Championship teams and was a two–time NBA Executive of the Year.

"Jerry Krause is one of a kind," Bulls Chairman Jerry Reinsdorf stated. "He brought with him a vision of how to build a champion and he proceeded to create one of the most dominant champions of all time. No basketball fan in America can begin to imagine the World Champion Chicago Bulls without his imprint."

One week later, the Bulls named John Paxson EVP of Basketball Operations. Paxson had spent the previous seven seasons as a color analyst on both the Bulls Radio and TV networks, providing expert analysis to the broadcasts. He spent one season (1995–96) as Assistant Coach, helping the Bulls to a then NBA-record 72–10 record and the 1996 NBA Finals.

"I am really excited to accept this challenge and look forward to working with the basketball operations staff," said Paxson. "The Bulls organization has meant a lot to me over the years, and getting the chance to help lead the team back to the upper echelon of the NBA is a true honor."

Other Notes: Jay Williams authored his first career triple–double, recording season highs of 26 points, 14 rebounds and 13 assists in 45 minutes versus New Jersey (11/9) ... Marcus Fizer suffered a torn ACL at Portland on 01/31/03 and was forced to miss the final 36 games of the season ... Chicago appeared in a franchise-record nine overtime games (1–8).

Honors: Tyson Chandler (sophomore team) participated in the Schick Rookie Challenge at All-Star Weekend ... Jay Williams was named the NBA's "got milk?" Rookie of the Month for December ... Williams (freshman team) also participated in the Schick Rookie Challenge at All-Star Weekend and was named to the got milk? NBA All–Rookie Second Team ... Eddy Curry led the league in field goal percentage with .585 shooting from the floor ... the Bulls drew an average of 19,617 fans through 41 home games (fifth in the NBA in attendance) and had 20 home crowds of 20,000+ (14–6 record), including 12 sellouts.

=== Season standings ===
Central Division	W	L	PCT	GB	Home	Road	Div
y-Detroit Pistons	50	32	.610	–	30–11	20–21	19–9
x-Indiana Pacers	48	34	.585	2	32–9	16–25	19–9
x-New Orleans Hornets	47	35	.573	3	29–12	18–23	17–11
x-Milwaukee Bucks	42	40	.512	8	25–16	17–24	16–12
e-Atlanta Hawks	35	47	.427	15	26–15	9–32	14–14
e-Chicago Bulls	30	52	.366	20	27–14	3–38	12–16
e-Toronto Raptors	24	58	.293	26	15–26	9–32	10–18
e-Cleveland Cavaliers	17	65	.207	33	14–27	3–38	5–23

#	Eastern Conference				
#	Team	W	L	PCT	GB
1	c-Detroit Pistons	50	32	.610	–
2	y-New Jersey Nets	49	33	.598	1
3	x-Indiana Pacers	48	34	.585	2
4	x-Philadelphia 76ers	48	34	.585	2
5	x-New Orleans Hornets	47	35	.573	3
6	x-Boston Celtics	44	38	.537	6
7	x-Milwaukee Bucks	42	40	.512	8
8	x-Orlando Magic	42	40	.512	8
9	e-New York Knicks	37	45	.451	13
10	e-Washington Wizards	37	45	.451	13
11	e-Atlanta Hawks	35	47	.427	15
12	e-Chicago Bulls	30	52	.366	20
13	e-Miami Heat	25	57	.305	25
14	e-Toronto Raptors	24	58	.293	26
15	e-Cleveland Cavaliers	17	65	.207	33

== Player statistics ==
Legend
GP	Games played	GS	Games started	MPG	Minutes per game
FG%	Field-goal percentage	3P%	3-point field-goal percentage	FT%	Free-throw percentage
RPG	Rebounds per game	APG	Assists per game	SPG	Steals per game
BPG	Blocks per game	PPG	Points per game

=== Regular season ===
Player	GP	GS	MPG	FG%	3P%	FT%	RPG	APG	SPG	BPG	PPG
Dalibor Bagarić	10	0	7.6	.308		.750	2.0	.4	.3	.3	1.9
Lonny Baxter	55	0	12.4	.466	.000	.680	3.0	.3	.2	.4	4.8
Corie Blount	50	3	16.7	.485		.571	4.1	1.0	.7	.4	3.0
Rick Brunson	17	0	11.5	.460	.667	.833	1.1	2.1	.6	.2	3.5
Tyson Chandler	75	68	24.4	.531		.608	6.9	1.0	.5	1.4	9.2
Jamal Crawford	80	31	24.9	.413	.355	.806	2.3	4.2	1.0	.3	10.7
Eddy Curry	81	48	19.4	.585		.624	4.4	.5	.2	.8	10.5
Marcus Fizer	38	0	21.3	.465	.167	.657	5.7	1.3	.4	.4	11.7
Trenton Hassell	82	53	24.4	.367	.325	.745	3.1	1.8	.5	.7	4.2
Fred Hoiberg	63	0	12.4	.389	.238	.820	2.2	1.1	.6	.1	2.3
Donyell Marshall	78	53	30.5	.459	.379	.756	9.0	1.8	1.2	1.1	13.4
Roger Mason Jr.	17	0	6.6	.355	.333	1.000	.7	.7	.2	.0	1.8
Eddie Robinson	64	18	21.2	.492	.214	.810	3.1	1.0	1.0	.2	5.7
Jalen Rose	82	82	40.9	.406	.370	.854	4.3	4.8	.9	.3	22.1
Jay Williams	75	54	26.1	.399	.322	.640	2.6	4.7	1.1	.2	9.5

Player statistics citation:

== Awards and records ==
- Jay Williams, NBA All-Rookie Team 2nd Team

== See also ==
- 2002–03 NBA season
