= Lucious Harris =

American basketball player (born 1970)

Personal information
- Born: December 18, 1970 (age 55) Los Angeles, California, U.S.
- Listed height: 6 ft 5 in (1.96 m)
- Listed weight: 205 lb (93 kg)

Career information
- High school: Cleveland (Los Angeles, California)
- College: Long Beach State (1989–1993)
- NBA draft: 1993: 2nd round, 28th overall pick
- Drafted by: Dallas Mavericks
- Playing career: 1993–2005
- Position: Shooting guard
- Number: 30, 12

Career history
- 1993–1996: Dallas Mavericks
- 1996–1997: Philadelphia 76ers
- 1997–2004: New Jersey Nets
- 2004–2005: Cleveland Cavaliers

Career highlights
- 2× First-team All-Big West (1992, 1993); No. 30 retired by Long Beach State 49ers

Career NBA statistics
- Points: 5,784 (7.2 ppg)
- Rebounds: 1,864 (2.3 rpg)
- Assists: 1,130 (1.4 apg)
- Stats at NBA.com
- Stats at Basketball Reference

Lucious H. Harris (born December 18, 1970) is an American former professional basketball player who was selected by the Dallas Mavericks in the second round (28th pick overall) of the 1993 NBA draft. Harris has played for the Mavericks, Philadelphia 76ers, New Jersey Nets, and Cleveland Cavaliers in 12 NBA seasons. He played in the 2002 and 2003 NBA Finals as a member of the Nets.

Harris has played in 800 games and has scored a total of 5,784 points in his NBA career. He was selected as Eastern Conference Player of the Week for the week of December 23–29, 2002. He played seven seasons for the New Jersey Nets before being released during the off-season of 2004 due to the team's salary-cap problems. He went on to play for the Cleveland Cavaliers during the 2004–05 season; however, Harris shot 40% from the field and 32% from the 3-point zone while averaging a career-low 4.3 points per game. Following that season, he was released by the Cavaliers in an attempt to get under the salary cap.

On February 3, 2007, Harris's #30 jersey was retired by Long Beach State during halftime of the 49ers' game against the University of the Pacific. Harris was the school's all-time leading scorer, scoring 2,312 points throughout his career. In addition, Harris was the school's single-season leading scorer, scoring 739 points in the 1992–1993 season. Lucious was also known for his defense.
