= Voshon Lenard =

American basketball player (born 1973)

Personal information
- Born: May 14, 1973 (age 53) Detroit, Michigan, U.S.
- Listed height: 6 ft 4 in (1.93 m)
- Listed weight: 215 lb (98 kg)

Career information
- High school: Southwestern (Detroit, Michigan)
- College: Minnesota (1991–1995)
- NBA draft: 1994: 2nd round, 46th overall pick
- Drafted by: Milwaukee Bucks
- Playing career: 1995–2006
- Position: Shooting guard
- Number: 22, 21, 5, 2, 1, 0

Career history
- 1995–1996: Oklahoma City Cavalry
- 1995–2000: Miami Heat
- 2000–2002: Denver Nuggets
- 2002–2003: Toronto Raptors
- 2003–2006: Denver Nuggets
- 2006: Portland Trail Blazers

Career highlights
- NBA Three-Point Contest champion (2004); Second-team Parade All-American (1991)

Career NBA statistics
- Points: 6,745 (11.9 ppg)
- 3PFG: 936
- 3P%: .384
- Stats at NBA.com
- Stats at Basketball Reference

Voshon Kelan Lenard (born May 14, 1973) is an American former professional basketball player who played 11 seasons in the National Basketball Association (NBA). He was listed as 6 ft 4 in (1.93 m) and 215 lbs, and was born in Detroit, Michigan.

== College career ==
Lenard played college basketball at the University of Minnesota. After his junior season, he decided to test the waters of the NBA, and declared himself eligible for the draft. The Milwaukee Bucks selected Lenard in the second round of the 1994 NBA draft. Lenard subsequently opted instead to return to Minnesota to play out his senior season. He finished his career with the Golden Gophers as the school's all-time leading scorer with 2,103 points.

== Professional career ==
After graduating, Lenard went on to play in the minor-league Continental Basketball Association (CBA). He averaged 30.1 points per game in 18 games for the Oklahoma City Cavalry during the 1995–96 season. He left in mid-season when he signed a contract with the Miami Heat of the NBA.

=== Miami Heat (1995–2000) ===
Lenard played in 30 games for Miami to finish the 1996 season, averaging 5.9 points a game off the bench. The franchise had recently been rebuilt led by head coach Pat Riley and featured all-stars Alonzo Mourning, Tim Hardaway and another shooting guard who would split minutes with Lenard, Dan Majerle.

Lenard increased his scoring to 12.3 points a game in the 1996–1997 season, as he started in 47 of 73 games for a Heat team that posted its then best season in franchise history with 61 regular-season wins, and a playoff run that included a first ever trip to the Eastern Conference Finals. Lenard was particularly effective at shooting from beyond the three-point line, placing 7th in the league in three-point shots made and 10th in the league in three-point shooting percentage. The season also featured a memorable moment for Lenard and the Heat, when on December 11 in a road game against the Cleveland Cavaliers he scrambled for a loose ball rebound with 3 seconds left and the game tied, managing to launch and make a double-pump leaning shot to give Miami the big road win and one of the most memorable game winners in Miami Heat history. In the playoffs Lenard started in all 17 games for the Heat, averaging 11.4 points a game including a 24-point playoff debut against the Orlando Magic in the first round and 19 points in the series clinching 5th game. Miami would face the New York Knicks in the semifinals, a series that would go to 7 games in which Lenard scored 22 points in game 3 and 21 in game 5. Miami would go on to lose in 5 games to the defending champion Chicago Bulls in the East Finals.

The now proven and popular Lenard would then start in 81 games in the 1997–1998 season, averaging 12.6 points a game while continuing to shoot 40 percent from three-point range. The Heat would make the playoffs but would lose in the first round to New York in 5 games in the first round, with Lenard averaging 14.4 points during the series. An injury would force Lenard to play in just 12 games in the lockout shortened 1998–1999 season, in which Miami again fell to the Knicks in the first round.

In the 1999–2000 season Lenard played mostly off the bench, but averaged double-figure scoring with 11.9 points a game while shooting 39 percent from three-point range. Injuries would keep him out of the tail end of the season as well as the playoffs in which the Heat defeated the Detroit Pistons before once again falling to New York in a seven-game series. Following the season the Heat traded Lenard and Mark Strickland to the Denver Nuggets for Chris Gatling.

=== Denver Nuggets (2000–2002) ===
In his first season with the Nuggets, Lenard started in 58 of 80 regular-season games and averaged 12.2 points for a team that failed to make the playoffs, but he placed 10th in the league in total three-point field goals made. The following year featured lineup and rotation changes and he started in 19 of the 71 games he appeared in, but still averaged over 11 points a game. Following the season he signed with the Toronto Raptors.

=== Toronto Raptors (2002–2003) ===
The Raptors had made the playoffs for three straight seasons and featured superstar Vince Carter, all-star Antonio Davis and coach Lenny Wilkens. Lenard started in 24 games of the 63 in which he appeared, but averaged 30 minutes a game, his most on the floor since the 1998 season. As a result, he averaged a career-high 14.3 points a game and was second on the team in three-point field goals. Despite this, Carter's injuries and other problems with the team led them to miss the playoffs, and Lenard returned to Denver in the off-season.

=== Return to Denver and the playoffs (2003–2006) ===
The Nuggets had continued their playoff drought, but had managed to secure the 3rd pick in the 2003 NBA draft and selected college star and NCAA Champion Carmelo Anthony. The 2003–2004 season would then prove to be a personal best for Lenard, as he started in 70 games and averaged 14.2 points a game as the Nuggets, led by the play of Anthony, Andre Miller and Marcus Camby, returned to the postseason. Lenard was also the winner of the 2004 NBA All-Star Weekend Three-point Shootout which took place in Los Angeles, and would see his first postseason action since 1999, averaging a personal best 17 points a game in a five-game series loss against the top-seeded Minnesota Timberwolves.

The Nuggets looked forward to the 2004–2005 season with optimism following the off-season acquisition of all-star forward Kenyon Martin, but in the season opener against the Los Angeles Lakers Lenard suffered an Achilles tendon injury that forced him out of nearly the entire season, only managing to play in two other games. Despite his limited mobility Lenard was able to participate in the 2005 three-point shootout during All-Star weekend, which was won by Quentin Richardson. Despite returning to action in the 2005–2006 season, Lenard suffered more injuries and was packaged to the Portland Trail Blazers in a four-team trade at the time of season trade deadline in February.

=== Portland Trail Blazers (2006) ===
Lenard would only play in 14 games to finish the season in Portland, and retired at the conclusion of 2006 season.
