= 2002–03 Sacramento Kings season =

NBA professional basketball team season

- Division champions
- Head coach: Rick Adelman
- President: Geoff Petrie
- General manager: Geoff Petrie
- Owners: Maloof family
- Arena: ARCO Arena

Results
- Record: 59–23 (.720)
- Place: Division: 1st (Pacific); Conference: 2nd (Western)
- Playoff finish: Conference semifinals (lost to Mavericks 3–4)
- Stats at Basketball Reference

Local media
- Television: KXTV; Fox Sports Net Bay Area
- Radio: KHTK

The 2002–03 Sacramento Kings season was the 54th season for the Sacramento Kings in the National Basketball Association, and their 18th season in Sacramento, California. The Kings were coming off their controversial Western Conference Finals defeat to the Los Angeles Lakers, who won the series in seven games.

== Season summary ==
=== Off-season ===
During the off-season, the Kings signed free agents Keon Clark and Damon Jones, and later on in December signed Jim Jackson.

For the season, the Kings redesigned their home and road uniforms, adding a V-shaped collar, side panels to their jerseys and shorts, and their alternate logo of a silver and black crown with a basketball, above the letters "S" and "K" on purple and silver backgrounds respectively. The white home uniforms featured the team name "Kings" with a crown above the letter "I" on the front of their jerseys, along with a purple and silver trim and purple side panels with silver outlines. The road uniforms were changed from black to purple, and featured the city name "Sacramento", a black and white trim, and black side panels with white outlines.

The team's new uniforms would remain in use until 2008.

=== Regular season ===
After a 6–4 start to the regular season, the Kings won 12 of their next 13 games, while posting two six-game winning streaks in November and December, and later on held a 34–17 record at the All-Star break. The team posted another six-game winning streak in March, and won 13 of their final 15 games of the season. The Kings finished in first place in the Pacific Division with a 59–23 record, and earned the second seed in the Western Conference; the team qualified for the NBA playoffs for the fifth consecutive year.

Chris Webber averaged 23.0 points, 10.5 rebounds, 5.4 assists, 1.6 steals and 1.3 blocks per game, and was named to the All-NBA Second Team, while Peja Stojaković averaged 19.2 points and 5.5 rebounds per game, and led the Kings with 155 three-point field goals, and Mike Bibby provided the team with 15.9 points, 5.2 assists and 1.3 steals per game, but only played 55 games due to a foot injury. In addition, Bobby Jackson contributed 15.2 points per game in 59 games, starting in 26 of them, and was named the NBA Sixth Man of the Year, while Vlade Divac provided with 9.9 points, 7.2 rebounds and 1.3 blocks per game, and Doug Christie contributed 9.4 points, 4.7 assists and 2.3 steals per game, and was named to the NBA All-Defensive First Team. Off the bench, Jim Jackson averaged 7.7 points and 4.2 rebounds per game, while Clark provided with 6.7 points, 5.6 rebounds and 1.2 blocks per game, and Hedo Türkoğlu contributed 6.7 points per game.

During the NBA All-Star weekend at the Philips Arena in Atlanta, Georgia, Webber and Stojaković were both selected for the 2003 NBA All-Star Game, as members of the Western Conference All-Star team, while head coach Rick Adelman was selected to coach the Western Conference. However, Webber did not participate due to a sprained ankle, as Stojaković was selected as his replacement. Webber also finished in tenth place in Most Valuable Player voting, while Bobby Jackson finished in eleventh place in Most Improved Player voting; Christie finished in fifth place in Defensive Player of the Year voting, while Clark finished tied in eleventh place in Sixth Man of the Year voting, and Adelman finished in fifth place in Coach of the Year voting.

The Kings finished twelfth in the NBA in home-game attendance, with an attendance of 709,997 at the ARCO Arena II during the regular season.

=== NBA playoffs ===
In the Western Conference First Round of the 2003 NBA playoffs, and for the second consecutive year, the Kings faced off against the 7th–seeded Utah Jazz, a team that featured All-Star forward Karl Malone, Matt Harpring and John Stockton. The Kings won the first two games over the Jazz at home at the ARCO Arena II, before losing Game 3 on the road, 107–104 at the Delta Center. The Kings won the next two games, which included a Game 5 win over the Jazz at the ARCO Arena II, 111–91 to win the series in five games.

In the Western Conference Semi-finals, and also for the second consecutive year, the team faced off against the 3rd–seeded Dallas Mavericks, who were led by the trio of All-Star forward Dirk Nowitzki, All-Star guard Steve Nash, and Michael Finley. The Kings won Game 1 over the Mavericks on the road, 124–113 at the American Airlines Center. However, in Game 2, Webber suffered a knee injury and was out for the remainder of the playoffs, as the Kings lost to the Mavericks, 132–110; Webber's knee required microfracture surgery following the season. Without Webber, the Kings lost Game 3 to the Mavericks at home in double-overtime, 141–137 at the ARCO Arena II. The Mavericks later on took a 3–2 series lead, but the Kings managed to win Game 6 at the ARCO Arena II, 115–109 to even the series. However, the Kings lost Game 7 to the Mavericks at the American Airlines Center, 112–99, thus losing in a hard-fought seven-game series.

=== Aftermath ===
Following the season, Türkoğlu was traded to the San Antonio Spurs, while Scot Pollard was traded to the Indiana Pacers in a three-team trade, Clark was dealt to the Utah Jazz, Jim Jackson signed as a free agent with the Houston Rockets, and Jones was released to free agency. This would be the final season in which the Kings won the Pacific Division title until the 2022–23 season.

== Offseason ==
=== Draft picks ===
Round	Pick	Player	Position	Nationality	College
1	28	Dan Dickau	PG	United States	Gonzaga
2	57	Corsley Edwards	F/C	United States	Central Connecticut State

== Roster ==
2002–03 Sacramento Kings roster
Players

Pos.	No.	Player	Height	Weight	DOB	From
G	10	Mike Bibby	6 ft 1 in (1.85 m)	190 lb (86 kg)	1978–05–13	Arizona
G	13	Doug Christie	6 ft 6 in (1.98 m)	200 lb (91 kg)	1970–05–09	Pepperdine
C	7	Keon Clark	6 ft 11 in (2.11 m)	220 lb (100 kg)	1975–04–16	UNLV
G	8	Mateen Cleaves	6 ft 2 in (1.88 m)	205 lb (93 kg)	1977–09–07	Michigan State
C	21	Vlade Divac	7 ft 1 in (2.16 m)	243 lb (110 kg)	1968–02–03	Serbia
F	51	Lawrence Funderburke	6 ft 9 in (2.06 m)	230 lb (104 kg)	1970–12–15	Ohio State
G	24	Bobby Jackson	6 ft 1 in (1.85 m)	185 lb (84 kg)	1973–03–13	Minnesota
F	22	Jim Jackson	6 ft 6 in (1.98 m)	220 lb (100 kg)	1970–10–14	Ohio State
G	9	Damon Jones	6 ft 3 in (1.91 m)	185 lb (84 kg)	1976–08–25	Houston
C	31	Scot Pollard	6 ft 11 in (2.11 m)	265 lb (120 kg)	1975–02–12	Kansas
G	25	Brent Price	6 ft 1 in (1.85 m)	165 lb (75 kg)	1968–12–09	Oklahoma
F	16	Peja Stojaković	6 ft 10 in (2.08 m)	220 lb (100 kg)	1977–06–09	Serbia
F	5	Hedo Türkoğlu	6 ft 10 in (2.08 m)	220 lb (100 kg)	1979–03–19	Turkey
F	3	Gerald Wallace	6 ft 7 in (2.01 m)	215 lb (98 kg)	1982–07–23	Alabama
F	4	Chris Webber	6 ft 9 in (2.06 m)	245 lb (111 kg)	1973–03–01	Michigan

Coaches
Head coach
- Rick Adelman
Assistant(s)
- Pete Carril
- Terry Porter
- Elston Turner
- John Wetzel

Legend
- (DP) Unsigned draft pick
- (FA) Free agent
- (S) Suspended
- (IN) Inactive
- Injured

Roster
Updated: November 30, 2002

=== Roster notes ===
- Point guard Brent Price was on the injured reserve list due to a back injury, and missed the entire regular season.

== Regular season ==
=== Season standings ===
Pacific Division	W	L	PCT	GB	Home	Road	Div
y-Sacramento Kings	59	23	.720	–	35–6	24–17	17–7
x-Los Angeles Lakers	50	32	.610	9	31–10	19–22	15–9
x-Portland Trail Blazers	50	32	.610	9	27–14	23–18	15–9
x-Phoenix Suns	44	38	.537	15	30–11	14–27	12–12
e-Seattle SuperSonics	40	42	.488	19	25–16	15–26	11–13
e-Golden State Warriors	38	44	.463	21	24–17	14–27	8–16
e-Los Angeles Clippers	27	55	.329	32	16–25	11–30	6–18

#	Western Conference				
#	Team	W	L	PCT	GB
1	z-San Antonio Spurs	60	22	.732	–
2	y-Sacramento Kings	59	23	.720	1
3	x-Dallas Mavericks	60	22	.732	–
4	x-Minnesota Timberwolves	51	31	.622	9
5	x-Los Angeles Lakers	50	32	.610	10
6	x-Portland Trail Blazers	50	32	.610	10
7	x-Utah Jazz	47	35	.573	13
8	x-Phoenix Suns	44	38	.537	16
9	e-Houston Rockets	43	39	.524	17
10	e-Seattle SuperSonics	40	42	.488	20
11	e-Golden State Warriors	38	44	.463	22
12	e-Memphis Grizzlies	28	54	.341	32
13	e-Los Angeles Clippers	27	55	.329	33
14	e-Denver Nuggets	17	65	.207	43

z – clinched division title
y – clinched division title
x – clinched playoff spot

=== Game log ===
2002–03 game log
Total: 59–23 (home: 35–6; road: 24–17)
October: 2–0 (home: 2–0; road: 0–0)

Game	Date	Team	Score	High points	High rebounds	High assists	Location Attendance	Record
1	October 29	Cleveland	W 94–67	Damon Jones (18)	Chris Webber (14)	Bobby Jackson (5)	ARCO Arena; 17,317	1–0
2	October 31	Portland	W 100–72	Peja Stojaković (26)	B. Jackson, Wallace (10)	Vlade Divac (6)	ARCO Arena; 17,317	2–0

November: 11–5 (home: 6–0; road: 5–5)

Game	Date	Team	Score	High points	High rebounds	High assists	Location Attendance	Record
3	November 2	@ Memphis	W 116–99	Vlade Divac (24)	Keon Clark (10)	Vlade Divac (9)	Pyramid Arena; 17,112	3–0
4	November 3	@ Miami	L 78–88	Keon Clark (19)	Vlade Divac (10)	Christie, Clark, B. Jackson, Jones (3)	American Airlines Arena; 15,468	3–1
5	November 5	@ Orlando	L 121–125	Bobby Jackson (26)	Lawrence Funderburke (12)	Chris Webber (9)	TD Waterhouse Centre; 14,292	3–2
6	November 6	@ New York	L 88–95	Chris Webber (22)	Chris Webber (11)	Vlade Divac (7)	Madison Square Garden; 19,763	3–3
7	November 8	Memphis	W 99–91	Peja Stojaković (22)	Chris Webber (17)	Chris Webber (8)	ARCO Arena; 17,317	4–3
8	November 10	Atlanta	W 105–97	Chris Webber (27)	Vlade Divac (10)	Doug Christie (7)	ARCO Arena; 17,317	5–3
9	November 13	@ Golden State	W 104–93	Chris Webber (33)	Bobby Jackson (9)	Bobby Jackson (11)	The Arena in Oakland; 18,369	6–3
10	November 15	@ Seattle	L 97–111	Chris Webber (24)	Keon Clark (9)	Chris Webber (6)	KeyArena; 17,072	6–4
11	November 17	Orlando	W 101–99	Chris Webber (24)	Webber, Divac (10)	Webber, Türkoğlu (4)	ARCO Arena; 17,317	7–4
12	November 19	Chicago	W 111–98	Christie, B. Jackson (22)	Vlade Divac (10)	Divac, Webber (6)	ARCO Arena; 17,317	8–4
13	November 20	@ L.A. Clippers	W 93–89	Webber, B. Jackson (19)	Vlade Divac (10)	Doug Christie (9)	Staples Center; 18,087	9–4
14	November 22	Phoenix	W 118–101	Bobby Jackson (24)	Chris Webber (13)	Chris Webber (6)	ARCO Arena; 17,317	10–4
15	November 23	@ Portland	W 95–94	Chris Webber (24)	Chris Webber (10)	Vlade Divac (6)	Rose Garden; 18,782	11–4
16	November 26	@ Cleveland	W 91–85	Chris Webber (28)	Chris Webber (11)	Doug Christie (5)	Gund Arena; 11,595	12–4
17	November 27	@ Minnesota	L 74–90	Chris Webber (19)	Chris Webber (11)	Doug Christie (5)	Target Center; 17,821	12–5
18	November 29	L.A. Clippers	W 107–94	Bobby Jackson (31)	Gerald Wallace (10)	Christie, Divac (6)	ARCO Arena; 17,317	13–5

December: 10–4 (home: 6–2; road: 4–2)

Game	Date	Team	Score	High points	High rebounds	High assists	Location Attendance	Record
19	December 1	Houston	W 103–84	Gerald Wallace (21)	Gerald Wallace (8)	B. Jackson, Divac (5)	ARCO Arena; 17,317	14–5
20	December 3	Minnesota	W 98–86	Bobby Jackson (24)	Chris Webber (11)	Chris Webber (7)	ARCO Arena; 17,317	15–5
21	December 4	@ Denver	W 92–90	Chris Webber (31)	Vlade Divac (14)	Chris Webber (8)	Pepsi Center; 13,002	16–5
22	December 6	Denver	W 98–77	Doug Christie (23)	Chris Webber (11)	Doug Christie (6)	ARCO Arena; 17,317	17–5
23	December 8	@ San Antonio	W 104–80	Chris Webber (23)	Chris Webber (13)	Doug Christie (9)	SBC Center; 16,873	18–5
24	December 10	@ Houston	L 96–103	Chris Webber (30)	Chris Webber (11)	Bobby Jackson (6)	Compaq Center; 13,158	18–6
25	December 14	@ Utah	W 98–96	Chris Webber (27)	Chris Webber (13)	Webber, Christie (5)	Delta Center; 19,911	19–6
26	December 15	New Orleans	W 107–92	Chris Webber (28)	Chris Webber (8)	Chris Webber (7)	ARCO Arena; 17,317	20–6
27	December 17	Phoenix	W 95–86	Chris Webber (27)	Webber, Divac (12)	Vlade Divac (7)	ARCO Arena; 17,317	21–6
28	December 19	San Antonio	L 81–83	Chris Webber (23)	Chris Webber (12)	Chris Webber (6)	ARCO Arena; 17,317	21–7
29	December 21	@ Phoenix	L 101–110	Chris Webber (29)	Chris Webber (15)	Chris Webber (11)	America West Arena; 18,133	21–8
30	December 22	Golden State	W 103–88	Webber, Stojaković (20)	Chris Webber (12)	Chris Webber (6)	ARCO Arena; 17,317	22–8
31	December 25	@ L.A. Lakers	W 105–99	Chris Webber (25)	Chris Webber (15)	Chris Webber (6)	Staples Center; 18,997	23–8
32	December 28	Portland	L 113–119 (OT)	Mike Bibby (22)	Chris Webber (10)	Mike Bibby (6)	ARCO Arena; 17,317	23–9

January: 10–6 (home: 4–2; road: 6–4)

Game	Date	Team	Score	High points	High rebounds	High assists	Location Attendance	Record
33	January 4	@ Denver	W 87–76	Mike Bibby (24)	Peja Stojaković (10)	Doug Christie (7)	Pepsi Center; 17,393	24–9
34	January 5	Miami	W 96–70	Mike Bibby (22)	Vlade Divac (12)	Christie, Divac (4)	ARCO Arena; 17,317	25–9
35	January 7	@ Milwaukee	W 101–76	Mike Bibby (20)	Chris Webber (13)	Chris Webber (6)	Bradley Center; 16,072	26–9
36	January 9	@ New Jersey	W 118–82	Peja Stojaković (23)	Chris Webber (11)	Doug Christie (9)	Continental Airlines Arena; 20,049	27–9
37	January 10	@ Minnesota	L 109–115 (OT)	Chris Webber (30)	Chris Webber (8)	Mike Bibby (16)	Target Center; 16,591	27–10
38	January 12	Memphis	W 106–98	Peja Stojaković (30)	Webber, Divac (10)	Doug Christie (9)	ARCO Arena; 17,317	28–10
39	January 15	Dallas	W 123–94	Chris Webber (29)	Chris Webber (15)	Chris Webber (11)	ARCO Arena; 17,317	29–10
40	January 18	@ L.A. Clippers	L 107–112	Peja Stojaković (37)	Vlade Divac (10)	Mike Bibby (10)	Staples Center; 20,037	29–11
41	January 20	@ Golden State	W 102–80	Webber, Stojaković, Divac (16)	Vlade Divac (11)	Mike Bibby (9)	The Arena in Oakland; 19,871	30–11
42	January 21	New Jersey	W 109–102	Chris Webber (36)	Chris Webber (15)	Mike Bibby (10)	ARCO Arena; 17,317	31–11
43	January 23	@ Memphis	W 104–98	Chris Webber (26)	Vlade Divac (11)	Mike Bibby (8)	Pyramid Arena; 13,228	32–11
44	January 24	@ Atlanta	L 104–115	Chris Webber (32)	Chris Webber (13)	Webber, Bibby (6)	Philips Arena; 15,697	32–12
45	January 26	@ Toronto	L 97–101	Mike Bibby (30)	Chris Webber (19)	Chris Webber (10)	Air Canada Centre; 19,800	32–13
46	January 28	Utah	L 92–102	Peja Stojaković (32)	Stojaković, Divac (6)	Doug Christie (6)	ARCO Arena; 17,317	32–14
47	January 30	@ Seattle	W 95–77	Hedo Türkoğlu (22)	Peja Stojaković (14)	Vlade Divac (8)	KeyArena; 16,286	33–14
48	January 31	L.A. Lakers	L 113–124	Peja Stojaković (36)	Hedo Türkoğlu (7)	Doug Christie (5)	ARCO Arena; 17,317	33–15

February: 8–3 (home: 6–1; road: 2–2)

Game	Date	Team	Score	High points	High rebounds	High assists	Location Attendance	Record
49	February 2	@ Houston	L 89–105	Peja Stojaković (31)	Stojaković, Divac, Bibby, Wallace (6)	Vlade Divac (6)	Compaq Center; 16,285	33–16
50	February 4	@ Dallas	W 110–109	Mike Bibby (27)	Peja Stojaković (14)	Doug Christie (6)	American Airlines Center; 20,102	34–16
51	February 5	@ New Orleans	L 84–108	Peja Stojaković (20)	Keon Clark (9)	Bibby, Jones (4)	New Orleans Arena; 17,217	34–17
52	February 11	Washington	W 99–80	Peja Stojaković (20)	Doug Christie (12)	Mike Bibby (8)	ARCO Arena; 17,317	35–17
53	February 14	Seattle	W 110–81	Peja Stojaković (24)	Keon Clark (14)	Doug Christie (13)	ARCO Arena; 17,317	36–17
54	February 16	San Antonio	L 101–104	Vlade Divac (22)	Keon Clark (13)	Mike Bibby (8)	ARCO Arena; 17,317	36–18
55	February 18	Milwaukee	W 102–93	Peja Stojaković (26)	Vlade Divac (19)	Doug Christie (9)	ARCO Arena; 17,317	37–18
56	February 20	Boston	W 105–83	Christie, Clark (18)	Clark, Stojaković (9)	Doug Christie (9)	ARCO Arena; 17,317	38–18
57	February 23	New York	W 99–92	Chris Webber (20)	Chris Webber (11)	Chris Webber (9)	ARCO Arena; 17,317	39–18
58	February 25	Detroit	W 81–75	Chris Webber (19)	Chris Webber (13)	Vlade Divac (5)	ARCO Arena; 17,317	40–18
59	February 27	@ Dallas	W 126–124 (OT)	Peja Stojaković (36)	Keon Clark (11)	Bibby, Christie, Webber, Divac (6)	American Airlines Center; 20,059	41–18

March: 11–4 (home: 8–1; road: 3–3)

Game	Date	Team	Score	High points	High rebounds	High assists	Location Attendance	Record
60	March 1	@ San Antonio	L 100–108	Chris Webber (36)	Chris Webber (9)	Mike Bibby (8)	SBC Center; 18,797	41–19
61	March 3	Philadelphia	W 107–99	Chris Webber (29)	Vlade Divac (13)	Chris Webber (8)	ARCO Arena; 17,317	42–19
62	March 5	Minnesota	W 96–95 (OT)	Chris Webber (25)	Webber, Stojaković (11)	Mike Bibby (5)	ARCO Arena; 17,317	43–19
63	March 7	@ Utah	W 108–105 (OT)	Webber, Bibby (24)	Chris Webber (15)	Chris Webber (8)	Delta Center; 19,911	44–19
64	March 9	Indiana	W 107–88	Mike Bibby (17)	Chris Webber (12)	Chris Webber (6)	ARCO Arena; 17,317	45–19
65	March 13	@ Phoenix	L 84–109	Chris Webber (22)	Chris Webber (11)	Chris Webber (9)	America West Arena; 18,184	45–20
66	March 14	Toronto	W 119–84	Chris Webber (26)	Chris Webber (10)	Doug Christie (10)	ARCO Arena; 17,317	46–20
67	March 16	Dallas	L 123–129 (OT)	Peja Stojaković (30)	Chris Webber (15)	Chris Webber (9)	ARCO Arena; 17,317	46–21
68	March 18	Golden State	W 117–91	Peja Stojaković (20)	Chris Webber (10)	Doug Christie (6)	ARCO Arena; 17,317	47–21
69	March 20	L.A. Lakers	W 107–99	Chris Webber (26)	Chris Webber (11)	Christie, B. Jackson (4)	ARCO Arena; 17,317	48–21
70	March 22	@ Portland	W 113–104	Peja Stojaković (30)	Chris Webber (15)	Mike Bibby (8)	Rose Garden; 20,580	49–21
71	March 23	Houston	W 109–108	Chris Webber (24)	Vlade Divac (12)	Chris Webber (6)	ARCO Arena; 17,317	50–21
72	March 27	L.A. Clippers	W 93–83	Chris Webber (23)	Vlade Divac (13)	Doug Christie (6)	ARCO Arena; 17,317	51–21
73	March 29	@ Chicago	W 107–92	Peja Stojaković (27)	Chris Webber (10)	Jim Jackson (7)	United Center; 22,638	52–21
74	March 30	@ Detroit	L 88–99	Chris Webber (22)	Chris Webber (8)	Christie, Divac (4)	The Palace of Auburn Hills; 22,076	52–22

April: 7–1 (home: 3–0; road: 4–1)

Game	Date	Team	Score	High points	High rebounds	High assists	Location Attendance	Record
75	April 1	@ Indiana	W 103–98	Peja Stojaković (26)	Chris Webber (14)	Doug Christie (7)	Conseco Fieldhouse; 17,088	53–22
76	April 2	@ Washington	W 105–99	Chris Webber (28)	Chris Webber (9)	Vlade Divac (7)	MCI Center; 20,173	54–22
77	April 4	@ Boston	W 93–92	Chris Webber (27)	Chris Webber (11)	Mike Bibby (10)	FleetCenter; 18,624	55–22
78	April 6	@ Philadelphia	W 97–81	Webber, Stojaković (21)	Chris Webber (11)	Chris Webber (8)	First Union Center; 20,702	56–22
79	April 8	Seattle	W 107–85	Chris Webber (20)	Keon Clark (8)	Chris Webber (7)	ARCO Arena; 17,317	57–22
80	April 10	@ L.A. Lakers	L 104–117	Webber, Stojaković (24)	Chris Webber (9)	Bibby, Christie (5)	Staples Center; 18,997	57–23
81	April 11	Denver	W 105–103	Chris Webber (22)	Chris Webber (14)	Jason Williams (8)	ARCO Arena; 17,317	58–23
82	April 16	Utah	W 95–84	Chris Webber (15)	Divac, B. Jackson (7)	Chris Webber (7)	ARCO Arena; 17,317	59–23

2002–03 schedule

== Playoffs ==
2003 playoff game log
First round: 4–1 (home: 3–0; road: 1–1)

Game	Date	Team	Score	High points	High rebounds	High assists	Location Attendance	Series
1	April 19	Utah	W 96–90	Chris Webber (27)	Chris Webber (11)	Bobby Jackson (6)	ARCO Arena; 17,317	1–0
2	April 21	Utah	W 108–95	Peja Stojaković (29)	Clark, Divac (7)	Bobby Jackson (6)	ARCO Arena; 17,317	2–0
3	April 26	@ Utah	L 104–107	Chris Webber (24)	Chris Webber (11)	Mike Bibby (7)	Delta Center; 19,911	2–1
4	April 28	@ Utah	W 99–82	Peja Stojaković (27)	Chris Webber (11)	Mike Bibby (9)	Delta Center; 19,911	3–1
5	April 30	Utah	W 111–91	Chris Webber (26)	Chris Webber (11)	Mike Bibby (7)	ARCO Arena; 17,317	4–1

Conference Semifinals: 3–4 (home: 2–1; road: 1–3)

Game	Date	Team	Score	High points	High rebounds	High assists	Location Attendance	Series
1	May 6	@ Dallas	W 124–113	Peja Stojaković (26)	Christie, Stojaković (9)	Chris Webber (9)	American Airlines Center; 20,525	1–0
2	May 8	@ Dallas	L 110–132	Chris Webber (31)	Bobby Jackson (8)	Doug Christie (9)	American Airlines Center; 20,491	1–1
3	May 10	Dallas	L 137–141 (2OT)	Peja Stojaković (39)	Bobby Jackson (11)	Doug Christie (7)	ARCO Arena; 17,317	1–2
4	May 11	Dallas	W 99–83	Hedo Türkoğlu (17)	Peja Stojaković (12)	Doug Christie (7)	ARCO Arena; 17,317	2–2
5	May 13	@ Dallas	L 93–112	Doug Christie (21)	Christie, Pollard (9)	Doug Christie (7)	American Airlines Center; 20,556	2–3
6	May 15	Dallas	W 115–109	Peja Stojaković (24)	Jim Jackson (12)	Doug Christie (6)	ARCO Arena; 17,317	3–3
7	May 17	@ Dallas	L 99–112	Mike Bibby (25)	Peja Stojaković (9)	Bibby, Jackson (5)	American Airlines Center; 20,595	3–4

2003 schedule

== Player statistics ==
Legend
GP	Games played	GS	Games started	MPG	Minutes per game
FG%	Field-goal percentage	3P%	3-point field-goal percentage	FT%	Free-throw percentage
RPG	Rebounds per game	APG	Assists per game	SPG	Steals per game
BPG	Blocks per game	PPG	Points per game

=== Season ===
Player	GP	GS	MPG	FG%	3P%	FT%	RPG	APG	SPG	BPG	PPG
Mike Bibby	55	55	33.4	.470	.409	.861	2.7	5.2	1.3	0.1	15.9
Doug Christie	80	80	33.9	.479	.395	.810	4.3	4.7	2.3	0.5	9.4
Keon Clark	80	11	22.3	.501	.000	.656	5.6	1.0	0.5	1.9	6.7
Mateen Cleaves	12	0	4.6	.261	1.000	.750	0.7	0.8	0.2	0.0	1.3
Vlade Divac	80	80	29.8	.466	.240	.713	7.2	3.4	1.0	1.3	9.9
Lawrence Funderburke	27	0	8.5	.444		.588	2.0	0.3	0.0	0.4	2.7
Bobby Jackson	59	26	28.4	.464	.379	.846	3.7	3.1	1.2	0.1	15.2
Jim Jackson	63	0	20.8	.442	.451	.855	4.2	1.9	0.5	0.1	7.7
Damon Jones	49	1	14.5	.381	.364	.741	1.4	1.6	0.4	0.1	4.6
Scot Pollard	23	0	14.1	.460		.606	4.6	0.3	0.6	0.7	4.5
Peja Stojaković	81	81	34.0	.481	.382	.875	5.5	2.0	1.0	0.1	19.2
Hedo Türkoğlu	67	11	17.5	.422	.372	.800	2.8	1.3	0.4	0.2	6.7
Gerald Wallace	47	7	12.1	.492	.250	.527	2.7	0.5	0.5	0.3	4.7
Chris Webber	67	67	39.1	.461	.238	.607	10.5	5.4	1.6	1.3	23.0

=== Playoffs ===
Player	GP	GS	MPG	FG%	3P%	FT%	RPG	APG	SPG	BPG	PPG
Mike Bibby	12	12	33.7	.422	.282	.794	2.6	5.0	1.2	0.4	12.7
Doug Christie	12	12	31.8	.374	.250	.935	6.2	4.6	1.0	0.3	9.1
Keon Clark	12	0	14.3	.488		.714	3.7	0.3	0.3	0.7	4.6
Vlade Divac	12	12	26.4	.560		.673	5.8	2.3	0.7	0.9	11.4
Lawrence Funderburke	6	0	2.5	.375		.750	1.3	0.0	0.0	0.0	1.5
Bobby Jackson	12	0	27.6	.457	.349	.886	4.5	3.3	1.0	0.1	14.3
Jim Jackson	12	0	24.7	.500	.464	.774	3.9	1.2	0.7	0.3	11.3
Scot Pollard	8	0	11.4	.292		.769	3.8	0.3	0.1	0.9	3.0
Peja Stojaković	12	12	40.5	.480	.457	.850	6.9	2.5	0.8	0.4	23.1
Hedo Türkoğlu	10	5	17.4	.360	.286	.722	2.9	1.4	1.2	0.5	5.3
Gerald Wallace	7	0	2.6	.400		1.000	0.7	0.0	0.0	0.1	0.9
Chris Webber	7	7	35.1	.496	.000	.653	8.3	3.6	1.4	1.1	23.7

Player statistics citation:

== Awards and records ==
- Doug Christie, NBA All-Defensive First Team
- Bobby Jackson, Sixth Man of the Year
- Peja Stojaković, 2003 NBA All-Star Game
- Peja Stojaković, Player of the Week (Mar. 23)
- Chris Webber, 2003 NBA All-Star Game
- Chris Webber, Player of the Week (Dec. 15)
- Chris Webber, Player of the Month (Dec. 2002)
- Chris Webber, All-NBA Second Team
- Rick Adelman Western Conference All-Stars Head Coach

== See also ==
- 2002–03 NBA season
