= 2002–03 Milwaukee Bucks season =

NBA professional basketball team season

- Head coach: George Karl
- General manager: Ernie Grunfeld
- Owner: Herb Kohl
- Arena: Bradley Center

Results
- Record: 42–40 (.512)
- Place: Division: 4th (Central); Conference: 7th (Eastern)
- Playoff finish: First round (lost to Nets 2–4)
- Stats at Basketball Reference

Local media
- Television: WCGV-TV; Fox Sports Net North (Jim Paschke, Jon McGlocklin)
- Radio: WTMJ

The 2002–03 Milwaukee Bucks season was the 35th season for the Milwaukee Bucks in the National Basketball Association. For the first time since the 1993–94 season, Glenn Robinson was not on the opening day roster.

== Season summary ==
=== Off-season ===
The Bucks received the 13th overall pick in the 2002 NBA draft, and selected power forward Marcus Haislip from the University of Tennessee. During the off-season, the team acquired Toni Kukoč from the Atlanta Hawks.

=== Regular season ===
With the addition of Kukoč, the Bucks played around .500 in winning percentage with an 8–8 start to the regular season, but then fell below .500 as the team lost seven of their next nine games. The Bucks soon recovered and won 10 of their 14 games in January, and held a 25–23 record at the All-Star break. At mid-season, just before the trading deadline, the Bucks traded All-Star guard Ray Allen to the Seattle SuperSonics in exchange for All-Star guard Gary Payton, and Desmond Mason. With the addition of Payton and Mason, the Bucks won eight of their final nine games of the season, finishing in fourth place in the Central Division with a 42–40 record, and earning the seventh seed in the Eastern Conference.

Sam Cassell averaged 19.7 points and 5.8 assists per game, while Payton averaged 19.6 points, 7.4 assists and 1.4 steals per game in 28 games after the trade, and Michael Redd provided the team with 15.1 points per game, and also led them with 182 three-point field goals. In addition, Desmond Mason contributed 14.8 points and 6.7 rebounds per game in 28 games, while Tim Thomas provided with 13.3 points and 4.9 rebounds per game, and Kukoč contributed 11.6 points, 3.7 assists and 1.3 steals per game. Meanwhile, Anthony Mason averaged 7.2 points and 6.4 rebounds per game, Jason Caffey provided with 5.8 points and 3.5 rebounds per game, Dutch rookie center Dan Gadzuric contributed 3.4 points and 4.0 rebounds per game, Ervin Johnson averaged 2.2 points and 4.3 rebounds per game, and Joel Pryzbilla provided with 1.5 points, 4.5 rebounds and 1.4 blocks per game, but only played just 32 games due to injury.

Despite a stellar season before the mid-season trade, Allen was not selected for the 2003 NBA All-Star Game in Atlanta, Georgia; Allen averaged 21.3 points per game, and contributed 123 three-point field goals in 47 games with the Bucks. Payton finished in eleventh place in Defensive Player of the Year voting, while Redd finished in second place in Sixth Man of the Year voting, behind Bobby Jackson of the Sacramento Kings, and with Kukoč finishing in tenth place; Redd also finished in twelfth place in Most Improved Player voting.

The Bucks finished 17th in the NBA in home-game attendance, with an attendance of 665,966 at the Bradley Center during the regular season.

=== NBA playoffs ===
In the Eastern Conference First Round of the 2003 NBA playoffs, the Bucks faced off against the 2nd–seeded, and Atlantic Division champion New Jersey Nets, who were led by the trio of All-Star guard Jason Kidd, Kenyon Martin, and second-year star Richard Jefferson. The Nets took a 2–1 series lead, but the Bucks managed to win Game 4 at home in overtime, 119–114 at the Bradley Center. However, after losing Game 5 on the road, 89–82 at the Continental Airlines Arena, the Bucks lost Game 6 to the Nets at the Bradley Center, 113–101, thus losing the series in six games.

The Nets would advance to the NBA Finals for the second consecutive year, but would lose to the San Antonio Spurs in six games in the 2003 NBA Finals.

=== Aftermath ===
Following the season, Payton signed as a free agent with the Los Angeles Lakers, while Cassell and Johnson were both traded to the Minnesota Timberwolves, head coach George Karl was fired, and Caffey and Anthony Mason both retired.

== Draft picks ==
Round	Pick	Player	Position	Nationality	College
1	13	Marcus Haislip	PF	United States	Tennessee
2	34	Dan Gadzuric	C	Netherlands	UCLA
2	41	Ronald Murray	SG	United States	Shaw
2	47	Chris Owens	PF	United States	Texas

== Roster ==
2002–03 Milwaukee Bucks roster
Players

Pos.	No.	Player	Height	Weight	DOB	From
F	35	Jason Caffey	6 ft 8 in (2.03 m)	256 lb (116 kg)	1973–06–12	Alabama
G	10	Sam Cassell	6 ft 3 in (1.91 m)	185 lb (84 kg)	1969–11–18	Florida State
C	50	Dan Gadzuric	6 ft 11 in (2.11 m)	245 lb (111 kg)	1978–02–02	UCLA
F/C	12	Marcus Haislip	6 ft 10 in (2.08 m)	230 lb (104 kg)	1980–12–22	Tennessee
C	40	Ervin Johnson	6 ft 11 in (2.11 m)	245 lb (111 kg)	1967–12–21	LSU New Orleans
F	7	Toni Kukoč	6 ft 10 in (2.08 m)	192 lb (87 kg)	1968–09–18	Croatia
F	17	Anthony Mason	6 ft 7 in (2.01 m)	250 lb (113 kg)	1966–12–14	Tennessee State
G/F	24	Desmond Mason	6 ft 5 in (1.96 m)	222 lb (101 kg)	1977–10–11	Oklahoma State
G	20	Gary Payton	6 ft 4 in (1.93 m)	180 lb (82 kg)	1968–07–23	Oregon State
C	6	Joel Przybilla	7 ft 1 in (2.16 m)	245 lb (111 kg)	1979–10–10	Minnesota
G/F	22	Michael Redd	6 ft 6 in (1.98 m)	215 lb (98 kg)	1979–08–24	Ohio State
F/C	31	Jamal Sampson	6 ft 11 in (2.11 m)	257 lb (117 kg)	1983–05–13	California
F	5	Tim Thomas	6 ft 10 in (2.08 m)	240 lb (109 kg)	1977–02–26	Villanova

Coaches
Head coach
- George Karl
Assistant(s)
- Ron Adams
- Mike McNeive
- Sam Mitchell
- Don Newman

Legend
- (DP) Unsigned draft pick
- (FA) Free agent
- (S) Suspended
- Injured

Roster

== Regular season ==
=== Season standings ===
Central Division	W	L	PCT	GB	Home	Road	Div
y-Detroit Pistons	50	32	.610	–	30–11	20–21	19–9
x-Indiana Pacers	48	34	.585	2	32–9	16–25	19–9
x-New Orleans Hornets	47	35	.573	3	29–12	18–23	17–11
x-Milwaukee Bucks	42	40	.512	8	25–16	17–24	16–12
e-Atlanta Hawks	35	47	.427	15	26–15	9–32	14–14
e-Chicago Bulls	30	52	.366	20	27–14	3–38	12–16
e-Toronto Raptors	24	58	.293	26	15–26	9–32	10–18
e-Cleveland Cavaliers	17	65	.207	33	14–27	3–38	5–23

#	Eastern Conference				
#	Team	W	L	PCT	GB
1	c-Detroit Pistons	50	32	.610	–
2	y-New Jersey Nets	49	33	.598	1
3	x-Indiana Pacers	48	34	.585	2
4	x-Philadelphia 76ers	48	34	.585	2
5	x-New Orleans Hornets	47	35	.573	3
6	x-Boston Celtics	44	38	.537	6
7	x-Milwaukee Bucks	42	40	.512	8
8	x-Orlando Magic	42	40	.512	8
9	e-New York Knicks	37	45	.451	13
10	e-Washington Wizards	37	45	.451	13
11	e-Atlanta Hawks	35	47	.427	15
12	e-Chicago Bulls	30	52	.366	20
13	e-Miami Heat	25	57	.305	25
14	e-Toronto Raptors	24	58	.293	26
15	e-Cleveland Cavaliers	17	65	.207	33

=== Game log ===
2002–03 game log
Total: 42–40 (home: 0–0; road: 0–0)
October: 0–1 (home: 0–0; road: 0–1)

Game	Date	Team	Score	High points	High rebounds	High assists	Location Attendance	Record
1	October 30, 2002	@ Philadelphia	L 93–95				First Union Center; 19,569	0–1

November: 6–6 (home: 4–2; road: 2–4)

Game	Date	Team	Score	High points	High rebounds	High assists	Location Attendance	Record
2	November 2, 2002	Orlando	L 90–100	Michael Redd (17)	Toni Kukoc (12)	Kevin Ollie (5)	Bradley Center; 16,713	0–2
3	November 4, 2002	@ New York	W 97–88		Dan Gadzuric (10)		Madison Square Garden; 18,100	1–2
4	November 6, 2002	New Jersey	W 99–93				Bradley Center; 14,539	2–2
5	November 7, 2002	@ Minnesota	L 110–114				Target Center; 14,776	2–3
6	November 9, 2002	Philadelphia	W 110–105				Bradley Center; 16,782	3–3
7	November 13, 2002	Chicago	W 108–101				Bradley Center; 14,036	4–3
8	November 15, 2002	@ Indiana	L 100–103				Conseco Fieldhouse; 16,010	4–4
9	November 16, 2002	Boston	W 104–85				Bradley Center; 18,717	5–4
10	November 19, 2002	Miami	L 93–97				Bradley Center; 13,632	5–5
11	November 22, 2002	@ Golden State	W 95–91				The Arena in Oakland; 12,170	6–5
12	November 24, 2002	@ L. A. Lakers	L 99–111				STAPLES Center; 18,997	6–6
13	November 25, 2002	@ Phoenix	L 81–86				America West Arena; 12,986	6–7

December: 0–0 (home: 0–0; road: 0–0)

Game	Date	Team	Score	High points	High rebounds	High assists	Location Attendance	Record

January: 0–0 (home: 0–0; road: 0–0)

Game	Date	Team	Score	High points	High rebounds	High assists	Location Attendance	Record

February: 0–0 (home: 0–0; road: 0–0)

Game	Date	Team	Score	High points	High rebounds	High assists	Location Attendance	Record

March: 0–0 (home: 0–0; road: 0–0)

Game	Date	Team	Score	High points	High rebounds	High assists	Location Attendance	Record

April: 0–0 (home: 0–0; road: 0–0)

Game	Date	Team	Score	High points	High rebounds	High assists	Location Attendance	Record

2002–03 schedule

== Playoffs ==
2003 playoff game log
First Round: 2–4 (home: 1–2; road: 1–2)

Game	Date	Team	Score	High points	High rebounds	High assists	Location Attendance	Series
1	April 19	@ New Jersey	L 96–109	Tim Thomas (25)	Desmond Mason (8)	Gary Payton (10)	Continental Airlines Arena; 16,102	0–1
2	April 22	@ New Jersey	W 88–85	Gary Payton (22)	Anthony Mason (8)	Gary Payton (7)	Continental Airlines Arena; 17,633	1–1
3	April 24	New Jersey	L 101–103	Sam Cassell (24)	Tim Thomas (11)	Gary Payton (8)	Bradley Center; 17,539	1–2
4	April 26	New Jersey	W 119–114 (OT)	Toni Kukoč (23)	Desmond Mason (8)	Gary Payton (14)	Bradley Center; 18,391	2–2
5	April 29	@ New Jersey	L 82–89	Toni Kukoč (18)	Desmond Mason (12)	Gary Payton (5)	Continental Airlines Arena; 16,601	2–3
6	May 1	New Jersey	L 101–113	Gary Payton (24)	Tim Thomas (6)	Gary Payton (8)	Bradley Center; 18,717	2–4

2003 schedule

== Player statistics ==
Legend
GP	Games played	GS	Games started	MPG	Minutes per game
FG%	Field-goal percentage	3P%	3-point field-goal percentage	FT%	Free-throw percentage
RPG	Rebounds per game	APG	Assists per game	SPG	Steals per game
BPG	Blocks per game	PPG	Points per game

=== Season ===
Player	GP	GS	MPG	FG%	3FG%	FT%	RPG	APG	SPG	BPG	PPG
Ray Allen	47	46	35.8	43.7	39.5	91.3	4.6	3.5	1.2	0.2	21.3
Sam Cassell	78	77	34.6	47.0	36.2	86.1	4.4	5.8	1.1	0.2	19.7
Gary Payton	28	28	38.8	46.6	29.4	74.6	3.1	7.4	1.4	0.3	19.6
Michael Redd	82	14	28.2	46.9	43.8	80.5	4.5	1.4	1.2	0.2	15.1
Desmond Mason	28	25	34.0	47.4	29.4	76.5	6.7	2.4	0.7	0.4	14.8
Tim Thomas	80	70	29.5	44.3	36.6	78.0	4.9	1.3	0.9	0.6	13.3
Toni Kukoč	63	0	27.0	43.2	36.1	70.6	4.2	3.7	1.3	0.5	11.6
Anthony Mason	65	58	32.6	48.6	0.0	71.8	6.4	3.2	0.5	0.2	7.2
Jason Caffey	51	16	17.5	45.6	0.0	65.1	3.5	0.7	0.4	0.3	5.8
Kevin Ollie	53	4	21.3	45.9	20.0	74.7	1.9	3.4	0.7	0.1	5.7
Marcus Haislip	39	8	11.3	43.1	25.0	68.4	1.4	0.2	0.2	0.5	4.1
Dan Gadzuric	49	30	15.5	48.3	0.0	51.8	4.0	0.2	0.4	1.1	3.4
Ervin Johnson	69	17	17.0	45.2	0.0	68.2	4.3	0.3	0.5	0.9	2.2
Ronald Murray	12	0	3.5	34.6	0.0	62.5	0.1	0.3	0.3	0.0	1.9
Joel Przybilla	32	17	17.1	39.1	0.0	50.0	4.5	0.4	0.3	1.4	1.5
Jamal Sampson	5	0	1.6	0.0	0.0	0.0	0.4	0.2	0.2	0.0	0.0

=== Playoffs ===
Player	GP	GS	MPG	FG%	3FG%	FT%	RPG	APG	SPG	BPG	PPG
Gary Payton	6	6	41.8	42.9	6.7	70.0	3.0	8.7	1.3	0.2	18.5
Tim Thomas	6	5	31.8	46.2	57.1	71.9	4.8	1.3	0.5	1.0	17.8
Sam Cassell	6	6	36.2	47.0	52.4	93.3	3.2	2.7	0.5	0.2	17.2
Toni Kukoč	6	0	30.7	49.2	37.9	70.0	4.2	3.7	2.2	0.2	14.8
Desmond Mason	6	6	34.0	50.9	0.0	71.0	7.0	0.8	1.0	0.7	13.0
Michael Redd	6	0	21.3	40.4	25.0	92.9	3.5	1.8	0.3	0.2	9.7
Marcus Haislip	2	1	12.0	66.7	0.0	50.0	2.0	1.0	1.0	0.5	5.0
Anthony Mason	6	0	26.2	41.2	0.0	69.2	3.3	0.2	0.5	0.2	3.8
Ervin Johnson	6	3	12.7	37.5	0.0	0.0	4.0	0.5	0.5	0.8	1.0
Joel Przybilla	4	3	8.3	100.0	0.0	0.0	2.5	0.3	0.0	0.5	0.5

Player statistics citation:

== Awards and records ==
- George Karl, Coach of the Month in January

== Transactions ==
=== Overview ===
Players Added

Via draft

- Dan Gadzuric
- Marcus Haislip
- Ronald Murray
- Jamal Sampson

Via trade

- Toni Kukoč
- Desmond Mason
- Gary Payton

Via free agency

- Kevin Ollie
Players Lost

Via trade

- Ray Allen
- Ronald Murray
- Kevin Ollie
- Glenn Robinson

Via free agency

- Rafer Alston
- Greg Anthony
- Greg Foster
- Darvin Ham
- Mark Pope

=== Trades ===
August 2, 2002

February 20, 2003
To Milwaukee Bucks----
- Toni Kukoč
- Leon Smith
- 2003 1st round pick (T. J. Ford)
To Milwaukee Bucks----
- Desmond Mason
- Gary Payton
To Atlanta Hawks----
- Glenn Robinson
To Seattle SuperSonics----
- Ray Allen
- Ronald Murray
- Kevin Ollie
- 2003 1st round pick (Luke Ridnour)

=== Free agents ===
Player	Signed	Former team
Kevin Ollie	September 6, 2002	Indiana Pacers
Cedric Henderson	September 25, 2002	Golden State Warriors

Player Transactions Citation:

== See also ==
- 2002–03 NBA season
