= Keon Clark =

American basketball player (born 1975)

Personal information
- Born: April 16, 1975 (age 51) Danville, Illinois, U.S.
- Listed height: 6 ft 11 in (2.11 m)
- Listed weight: 221 lb (100 kg)

Career information
- High school: Danville (Danville, Illinois)
- College: Irvine Valley (1994–1995); Dixie State (1995–1996); UNLV (1996–1998)
- NBA draft: 1998: 1st round, 13th overall pick
- Drafted by: Orlando Magic
- Playing career: 1998–2004
- Position: Center / power forward
- Number: 13, 15, 7

Career history
- 1998–2001: Denver Nuggets
- 2001–2002: Toronto Raptors
- 2002–2003: Sacramento Kings
- 2003–2004: Utah Jazz

Career highlights
- First-team All-WAC (1997)

Career NBA statistics
- Points: 2,882 (8.2 ppg)
- Rebounds: 2,096 (5.9 rpg)
- Blocks: 571 (1.6 bpg)
- Stats at NBA.com
- Stats at Basketball Reference

Arian Keon Clark (born April 16, 1975) is an American former basketball player in the National Basketball Association (NBA).

== Playing career ==
After a collegiate career at two different junior colleges and UNLV, Clark was selected 13th overall by the Orlando Magic in the 1998 NBA draft but was traded to the Denver Nuggets. He began his professional career with Denver where he enjoyed a stable first three years in the NBA, improving steadily. Clark would go on to play for the Toronto Raptors, Sacramento Kings, and Utah Jazz. With the Jazz, he only played two games before being traded to the Phoenix Suns for whom he never played a game.

He holds the Toronto Raptors franchise record for most blocks in one game with 12, set on 23 March 2001 in a game against the Atlanta Hawks.

In 2002, Clark posted averages of 11.3 points and 1.51 blocks per game, while also finishing ninth in the NBA in total personal fouls.

He holds career averages of 8.2 points, 5.9 rebounds and 1.62 blocks per game.

== Personal life ==
Clark has been plagued by personal problems since leaving the NBA. In 2006, he was due to stand trial in Illinois on marijuana and weapons charges, but never showed up for trial. U.S. Marshals found him boarding a bus in Houston, Texas and brought him back to Danville for trial. He was sentenced to two and a half years in prison, but the sentence was thrown out because he did not have a lawyer at the time of sentencing. At a hearing, Clark admitted that he was a recovering alcoholic who had been drinking for most of the time since high school. He added that he "never played a game sober" during his NBA career, and usually drank during halftime. By his estimate, he drank half a pint to a pint of gin daily during his professional career.

On December 5, 2013, Clark was sentenced to eight years in prison for weapons charges but only served four. He was released from prison in July 2017, and currently lives in his hometown of Danville, Illinois.

== Career statistics ==
Legend
GP	Games played	GS	Games started	MPG	Minutes per game
FG%	Field goal percentage	3P%	3-point field goal percentage	FT%	Free throw percentage
RPG	Rebounds per game	APG	Assists per game	SPG	Steals per game
BPG	Blocks per game	PPG	Points per game	**Bold**	Career high

=== NBA ===
==== Regular season ====
Year	Team	GP	GS	MPG	FG%	3P%	FT%	RPG	APG	SPG	BPG	PPG
1998–99	Denver	28	0	14.6	.450	.000	.568	3.4	.4	.4	1.1	3.3
1999–00	Denver	**81**	20	22.8	**.542**	**.125**	**.688**	6.2	.9	.6	1.4	8.6
2000–01	Denver	35	3	21.5	.412	–	.600	5.3	1.0	.5	1.3	6.5
2000–01	Toronto	46	0	21.0	.522	.000	.585	5.4	.8	.3	**2.4**	9.0
2001–02	Toronto	**81**	**31**	**27.0**	.490	.000	.674	**7.4**	**1.1**	**.7**	1.5	**11.3**
2002–03	Sacramento	80	11	22.3	.501	.000	.656	5.6	1.0	.5	1.9	6.7
2003–04	Utah	2	0	13.5	.333	–	–	3.5	.5	.5	.0	2.0
Career		353	65	22.6	.500	.053	.645	5.9	.9	.5	1.6	8.2

==== Playoffs ====
Year	Team	GP	GS	MPG	FG%	3P%	FT%	RPG	APG	SPG	BPG	PPG
2001	Toronto	11	0	9.4	.367	–	.650	2.1	.5	.2	.3	3.2
2002	Toronto	5	**5**	**34.8**	**.542**	–	**.938**	**8.0**	**1.6**	**.4**	**1.6**	**13.4**
2003	Sacramento	**12**	0	14.3	.488	–	.714	3.7	.3	.3	.7	4.6
Career		28	5	16.0	.479	–	.754	3.8	.6	.3	.7	5.6

== See also ==
- List of National Basketball Association players with 10 or more blocks in a game
