= 2002–03 Detroit Pistons season =

NBA team season

- Division champions
- Head coach: Rick Carlisle
- President: Joe Dumars
- General manager: Joe Dumars
- Owner: Bill Davidson
- Arena: The Palace of Auburn Hills

Results
- Record: 50–32 (.610)
- Place: Division: 1st (Central); Conference: 1st (Eastern)
- Playoff finish: Eastern Conference finals (lost to Nets 0–4)
- Stats at Basketball Reference

Local media
- Television: Fox Sports Net Detroit; WKBD
- Radio: WDFN

The 2002–03 Detroit Pistons season was the 62nd season for the Detroit Pistons as a franchise, their 55th season in the National Basketball Association, and their 46th season in Detroit, Michigan.

== Season summary ==
=== Off-season ===
The Pistons had the 23rd overall pick in the 2002 NBA draft, and selected small forward Tayshaun Prince from the University of Kentucky. During the off-season, the team acquired Richard Hamilton from the Washington Wizards, and signed free agent Chauncey Billups.

=== Regular season ===
With the addition of Hamilton and Billups, the Pistons got off to a fast start by winning 12 of their first 16 games of the regular season. The team posted two six-game winning streaks in December, and between January and February, and held a 32–15 record at the All-Star break. However, the Pistons suffered a seven-game losing streak between February and March, and lost six of their final nine games of the season, but managed to finish in first place in the Central Division with a 50–32 record, and earned the first seed in the Eastern Conference. The team's record tied the 1976–77 Philadelphia 76ers for the worst record by a number one-seeded team in NBA history; the Pistons were also the only team in the Eastern Conference with 50 or more wins this season, while the Western Conference had six teams with 50 or more wins during the regular season.

Hamilton led the Pistons in scoring averaging 19.7 points per game, while Billups averaged 16.2 points and 3.9 assists per game, and led the team with 149 three-point field goals, and Clifford Robinson provided the team with 12.2 points per game. In addition, and off the bench, sixth man Corliss Williamson provided with 12.0 points and 4.4 rebounds per game, while Chucky Atkins contributed 7.1 points and 2.7 assists per game, and starting center Ben Wallace averaged 6.9 points, 15.4 rebounds, 1.4 steals and 3.2 blocks per game, and was named the NBA Defensive Player of the Year for the second consecutive year, and was also named to the All-NBA Second Team, and to the NBA All-Defensive First Team. Meanwhile, three-point specialist Jon Barry contributed 6.9 points per game, Turkish rookie center Mehmet Okur averaged 6.9 points and 4.7 rebounds per game, and starting small forward Michael Curry provided with 3.0 points per game.

During the NBA All-Star weekend at the Philips Arena in Atlanta, Georgia, Wallace was selected for the 2003 NBA All-Star Game, as a member of the Eastern Conference All-Star team; it was his first ever All-Star appearance. Wallace also finished in eighth place in Most Valuable Player voting, while Billups finished in sixth place in Most Improved Player voting, Williamson finished in fifth place in Sixth Man of the Year voting, with Barry finishing in ninth place, and head coach Rick Carlisle finished in fourth place in Coach of the Year voting.

The Pistons led the NBA in home-game attendance, with an attendance of 839,278 at The Palace of Auburn Hills during the regular season.

=== NBA playoffs ===
In the Eastern Conference First Round of the 2003 NBA playoffs, the Pistons faced off against the 8th–seeded Orlando Magic, a team that featured All-Star guard Tracy McGrady, rookie power forward Drew Gooden, and Darrell Armstrong. Despite having home-court advantage in the series, the Pistons struggled and faced elimination as the Magic took a 3–1 series lead, after the Pistons lost Game 4 on the road, 100–92 at the TD Waterhouse Centre. However, the Pistons managed to win the next three games, which included a Game 7 home win over the Magic at The Palace of Auburn Hills, 108–93 to win in a hard-fought seven-game series.

In the Eastern Conference Semi-finals, the team faced off against the 4th–seeded Philadelphia 76ers, who were led by All-Star guard Allen Iverson, Keith Van Horn and Eric Snow. The Pistons took a 2–0 series lead over the 76ers, but then lost the next two games on the road, which included a Game 4 loss to the 76ers at the First Union Center, 95–82. The Pistons managed to win the next two games, including a Game 6 win over the 76ers at the First Union Center in overtime, 93–89 to win the series in six games, and advance to the Conference Finals for the first time since the 1990–91 season.

In the Eastern Conference Finals, the Pistons then faced off against the 2nd–seeded, and Atlantic Division champion New Jersey Nets, who were led by the trio of All-Star guard Jason Kidd, Kenyon Martin, and second-year star Richard Jefferson. The Pistons lost the first two games to the Nets at The Palace of Auburn Hills, before losing the next two games on the road, including a Game 4 loss to the Nets at the Continental Airlines Arena, 102–82, thus losing the series in a four-game sweep.

The Nets would advance to the NBA Finals for the second consecutive year, but would lose to the San Antonio Spurs in six games in the 2003 NBA Finals.

=== Aftermath ===
Following the season, Carlisle was fired after two seasons with the Pistons, and would take a coaching job with the Indiana Pacers. Meanwhile, Robinson was traded to the Golden State Warriors, Barry signed as a free agent with the Denver Nuggets, and Curry was traded to the Toronto Raptors.

== Draft picks ==
Round	Pick	Player	Position	Nationality	College
1	23	Tayshaun Prince	SF	United States	Kentucky

== Roster ==
2002–03 Detroit Pistons roster
Players

Pos.	No.	Player	Height	Weight	DOB	From
G	7	Chucky Atkins	5 ft 11 in (1.80 m)	160 lb (73 kg)	1974–08–14	South Florida
G	20	Jon Barry	6 ft 4 in (1.93 m)	195 lb (88 kg)	1969–07–25	Georgia Tech
G	1	Chauncey Billups	6 ft 3 in (1.91 m)	202 lb (92 kg)	1976–09–25	Colorado
G/F	12	Michael Curry	6 ft 5 in (1.96 m)	210 lb (95 kg)	1968–08–22	Georgia Southern
G	44	Hubert Davis	6 ft 5 in (1.96 m)	183 lb (83 kg)	1970–05–17	North Carolina
G	32	Richard Hamilton	6 ft 7 in (2.01 m)	193 lb (88 kg)	1978–02–14	Connecticut
F	5	Danny Manning	6 ft 10 in (2.08 m)	230 lb (104 kg)	1966–05–17	Kansas
F/C	13	Mehmet Okur	6 ft 11 in (2.11 m)	290 lb (132 kg)	1979–05–26	Turkey
F	22	Tayshaun Prince	6 ft 9 in (2.06 m)	215 lb (98 kg)	1980–02–28	Kentucky
C	39	Željko Rebrača	7 ft 0 in (2.13 m)	257 lb (117 kg)	1972–04–09	Serbia
F	52	Don Reid	6 ft 8 in (2.03 m)	250 lb (113 kg)	1973–12–30	Georgetown
F	30	Clifford Robinson	6 ft 10 in (2.08 m)	225 lb (102 kg)	1966–12–16	Connecticut
G	6	Pepe Sánchez	6 ft 4 in (1.93 m)	195 lb (88 kg)	1977–05–08	Temple
F/C	3	Ben Wallace	6 ft 9 in (2.06 m)	245 lb (111 kg)	1974–09–10	Virginia Union
F	34	Corliss Williamson	6 ft 7 in (2.01 m)	245 lb (111 kg)	1973–12–04	Arkansas

Coaches
Head coach
- Rick Carlisle
Assistant(s)
- Tony Brown
- Kevin O'Neill
- Bob Ociepka
- Chad Forcier
- Mike Abdenour (trainer)

Legend
- (DP) Unsigned draft pick
- (FA) Free agent
- (S) Suspended
- Injured

Roster
Updated: February 5, 2003

== Regular season ==
=== Season standings ===
Central Division	W	L	PCT	GB	Home	Road	Div
y-Detroit Pistons	50	32	.610	–	30–11	20–21	19–9
x-Indiana Pacers	48	34	.585	2	32–9	16–25	19–9
x-New Orleans Hornets	47	35	.573	3	29–12	18–23	17–11
x-Milwaukee Bucks	42	40	.512	8	25–16	17–24	16–12
e-Atlanta Hawks	35	47	.427	15	26–15	9–32	14–14
e-Chicago Bulls	30	52	.366	20	27–14	3–38	12–16
e-Toronto Raptors	24	58	.293	26	15–26	9–32	10–18
e-Cleveland Cavaliers	17	65	.207	33	14–27	3–38	5–23

#	Eastern Conference				
#	Team	W	L	PCT	GB
1	c-Detroit Pistons	50	32	.610	–
2	y-New Jersey Nets	49	33	.598	1
3	x-Indiana Pacers	48	34	.585	2
4	x-Philadelphia 76ers	48	34	.585	2
5	x-New Orleans Hornets	47	35	.573	3
6	x-Boston Celtics	44	38	.537	6
7	x-Milwaukee Bucks	42	40	.512	8
8	x-Orlando Magic	42	40	.512	8
9	e-New York Knicks	37	45	.451	13
10	e-Washington Wizards	37	45	.451	13
11	e-Atlanta Hawks	35	47	.427	15
12	e-Chicago Bulls	30	52	.366	20
13	e-Miami Heat	25	57	.305	25
14	e-Toronto Raptors	24	58	.293	26
15	e-Cleveland Cavaliers	17	65	.207	33

z – clinched division title
y – clinched division title
x – clinched playoff spot

=== Game log ===
2002–03 game log
Total: 50-32 (Home: 26–15; Road: 24–17)
October: 1–0 (home: 1–0; road: 0–0)

Game	Date	Team	Score	High points	High rebounds	High assists	Location Attendance	Record
1	October 30	New York	W 86–77	Richard Hamilton (22)	Ben Wallace (14)	Chucky Atkins (4)	The Palace of Auburn Hills; 22,076	1–0

November : 11–5 (home: 6–1; road: 5–4)

Game	Date	Team	Score	High points	High rebounds	High assists	Location Attendance	Record
2	November 1	Memphis	W 109–86	Richard Hamilton (23)	Ben Wallace (14)	Chucky Atkins (7)	The Palace of Auburn Hills; 18,113	2–0
3	November 3	@ L.A. Clippers	L 72–74	Richard Hamilton (25)	Ben Wallace (16)	Clifford Robinson (3)	STAPLES Center; 14,275	2–1
4	November 4	@ Phoenix	W 84–82	Richard Hamilton (22)	Ben Wallace (14)	Chucky Atkins (6)	America West Arena; 13,256	3–1
5	November 6	@ Utah	W 80–78	Richard Hamilton (28)	Ben Wallace (15)	Hamilton, Atkins (5)	Delta Center; 15,055	4–1
6	November 7	@ Denver	W 89–63	Chauncey Billups (21)	Ben Wallace (13)	Clifford Robinson (5)	Pepsi Center; 11,982	5–1
7	November 9	@ Dallas	L 75–114	Richard Hamilton (19)	Ben Wallace (11)	Chucky Atkins (4)	American Airlines Center; 19,644	5–2
8	November 12	New Orleans	W 93–87	Chucky Atkins (20)	Ben Wallace (8)	Chucky Atkins (7)	The Palace of Auburn Hills; 16,224	6–2
9	November 15	Utah	W 86–75	Richard Hamilton (25)	Ben Wallace (15)	Richard Hamilton (5)	The Palace of Auburn Hills; 22,076	7–2
10	November 16	Denver	W 74–53	Clifford Robinson (19)	Ben Wallace (13)	Chucky Atkins (3)	The Palace of Auburn Hills; 22,076	8–2
11	November 18	@ New York	L 91–94	Richard Hamilton (31)	Ben Wallace (21)	Chucky Atkins (8)	Madison Square Garden; 17,981	8–3
12	November 20	Miami	W 79–68	Chucky Atkins (21)	Ben Wallace (19)	Jon Barry (9)	The Palace of Auburn Hills; 16,867	9–3
13	November 22	@ Miami	W 75–72	Richard Hamilton (17)	Ben Wallace (22)	Barry, Atkins (4)	American Airlines Arena; 15,328	10–3
14	November 23	@ Indiana	W 106–91	Richard Hamilton (22)	Ben Wallace (11)	Chucky Atkins (8)	Conseco Fieldhouse; 17,219	11–3
15	November 27	Dallas	L 82–102	Richard Hamilton (19)	Ben Wallace (24)	Davis, Barry (6)	The Palace of Auburn Hills; 22,076	11–4
16	November 29	Milwaukee	W 96–91	Richard Hamilton (20)	Ben Wallace (21)	Chucky Atkins (12)	The Palace of Auburn Hills; 22,076	12–4
17	November 30	@ Milwaukee	L 86–109	Clifford Robinson (16)	Ben Wallace (9)	Chucky Atkins (4)	Bradley Center; 16,217	12–5

December : 8–5 (home: 5–2; road: 3–3)

Game	Date	Team	Score	High points	High rebounds	High assists	Location Attendance	Record
18	December 4	Washington	L 83–88	Chucky Atkins (17)	Ben Wallace (15)	Clifford Robinson (7)	The Palace of Auburn Hills; 20,887	12–6
19	December 7	@ Atlanta	L 92–94	Richard Hamilton (25)	Ben Wallace (14)	Wallace, Hamilton (4)	Philips Arena; 7,856	12–7
20	December 11	Atlanta	W 91–80	Richard Hamilton (32)	Ben Wallace (18)	Chauncey Billups (5)	The Palace of Auburn Hills; 16,199	13–7
21	December 12	@ Chicago	W 86–76	Chauncey Billups (21)	Ben Wallace (21)	Richard Hamilton (9)	United Center; 15,691	14–7
22	December 14	Seattle	W 91–78	Richard Hamilton (25)	Ben Wallace (11)	Clifford Robinson (6)	The Palace of Auburn Hills; 22,076	15–7
23	December 15	New Jersey	W 101–91	Željko Rebrača (21)	Ben Wallace (9)	Jon Barry (5)	The Palace of Auburn Hills; 17,416	16–7
24	December 18	@ Cleveland	W 111–106 (OT)	Chauncey Billups (23)	Ben Wallace (19)	Clifford Robinson (6)	Gund Arena; 7,925	17–7
25	December 20	Cleveland	W 109–107 (OT)	Richard Hamilton (27)	Ben Wallace (19)	4 players tied (4)	The Palace of Auburn Hills; 17,388	18–7
26	December 21	@ New Jersey	L 92–100	Clifford Robinson (19)	Ben Wallace (14)	Michael Curry (5)	Continental Airlines Arena; 13,064	18–8
27	December 25	@ Orlando	L 99–104	Richard Hamilton (22)	Ben Wallace (9)	Chauncey Billups (13)	TD Waterhouse Centre; 13,725	18–9
28	December 26	@ Washington	W 87–82	Richard Hamilton (22)	Ben Wallace (13)	Chauncey Billups (5)	MCI Center; 20,173	19–9
29	December 28	Minnesota	W 106–82	Richard Hamilton (24)	Ben Wallace (17)	3 players tied (4)	The Palace of Auburn Hills; 22,076	20–9
30	December 30	Portland	L 74–85	Richard Hamilton (22)	Ben Wallace (20)	Curry, Billups (4)	The Palace of Auburn Hills; 22,076	20–10

January : 10–5 (home: 4–2; road: 6–3)

Game	Date	Team	Score	High points	High rebounds	High assists	Location Attendance	Record
31	January 4	@ Atlanta	W 90–86	Chauncey Billups (23)	Ben Wallace (20)	Michael Curry (4)	Philips Arena; 10,286	21–10
32	January 6	Toronto	W 82–74	Clifford Robinson (25)	Ben Wallace (15)	Chauncey Billups (5)	The Palace of Auburn Hills; 16,239	22–10
33	January 8	@ Philadelphia	W 103–94 (OT)	Richard Hamilton (29)	Ben Wallace (12)	Chauncey Billups (4)	First Union Center; 18,738	23–10
34	January 10	@ New Orleans	W 101–99 (OT)	Chauncey Billups (32)	Mehmet Okur (8)	Clifford Robinson (6)	New Orleans Arena; 16,909	24–10
35	January 11	Milwaukee	L 87–89	Chauncey Billups (26)	Corliss Williamson (9)	Richard Hamilton (5)	The Palace of Auburn Hills; 22,076	24–11
36	January 13	@ Orlando	W 101–86	Richard Hamilton (27)	Ben Wallace (19)	Billups, Barry (5)	TD Waterhouse Centre; 13,611	25–11
37	January 14	@ Miami	L 85–88	Richard Hamilton (24)	Ben Wallace (12)	3 players tied (3)	American Airlines Arena; 14,783	25–12
38	January 17	New York	W 99–82	Clifford Robinson (22)	Ben Wallace (11)	Richard Hamilton (5)	The Palace of Auburn Hills; 22,076	26–12
39	January 18	@ Indiana	L 86–88	Chauncey Billups (21)	Ben Wallace (11)	Billups, Barry (5)	Conseco Fieldhouse; 18,345	26–13
40	January 20	Indiana	W 88–78	Richard Hamilton (18)	Ben Wallace (15)	Chauncey Billups (8)	The Palace of Auburn Hills; 22,076	27–13
41	January 22	Philadelphia	L 83–92	Corliss Williamson (20)	Robinson, Wallace (9)	Clifford Robinson (5)	The Palace of Auburn Hills; 19,347	27–14
42	January 24	@ Houston	W 98–74	Clifford Robinson (20)	Ben Wallace (18)	Jon Barry (5)	Compaq Center; 14,911	28–14
43	January 25	@ San Antonio	L 76–108	Richard Hamilton (17)	Mehmet Okur (6)	3 players tied (2)	SBC Center; 17,353	28–15
44	January 28	Boston	W 86–83	Chauncey Billups (16)	Ben Wallace (13)	Clifford Robinson (6)	The Palace of Auburn Hills; 17,371	29–15
45	January 31	@ Boston	W 118–66	Richard Hamilton (29)	Ben Wallace (11)	Chucky Atkins (5)	FleetCenter; 18,624	30–15

February : 7–6 (home: 4–1; road: 3–5)

Game	Date	Team	Score	High points	High rebounds	High assists	Location Attendance	Record
46	February 1	New Jersey	W 106–84	Chauncey Billups (27)	Corliss Williamson (10)	3 players tied (3)	The Palace of Auburn Hills; 22,076	31–15
47	February 5	L.A. Clippers	W 89–80	Mehmet Okur (19)	Mehmet Okur (11)	Clifford Robinson (6)	The Palace of Auburn Hills; 18,844	32–15
All-Star Break
48	February 11	@ Chicago	W 89–79	Chauncey Billups (20)	Ben Wallace (22)	Barry, Billups (4)	United Center; 18,303	33–15
49	February 13	Orlando	W 98–88	Richard Hamilton (29)	Ben Wallace (18)	Robinson, Billups (4)	The Palace of Auburn Hills; 20,333	34–15
50	February 14	@ Milwaukee	L 86–96	Richard Hamilton (28)	Mehmet Okur (11)	Clifford Robinson (8)	Bradley Center; 16,294	34–16
51	February 16	@ Cleveland	W 90–75	Richard Hamilton (23)	Ben Wallace (16)	Chucky Atkins (4)	Gund Arena; 9,178	35–16
52	February 17	Miami	W 93–62	Richard Hamilton (34)	Ben Wallace (19)	Chauncey Billups (6)	The Palace of Auburn Hills; 17,177	36–16
53	February 19	@ Toronto	W 89–84	Chauncey Billups (18)	Ben Wallace (11)	Wallace, Williamson (4)	Air Canada Centre; 19,140	37–16
54	February 21	@ Minnesota	L 96–103	Hamilton, Billups (23)	Ben Wallace (12)	Chauncey Billups (7)	Target Center; 14,881	37–17
55	February 22	Charlotte	L 91–93	Richard Hamilton (23)	Ben Wallace (14)	4 players tied (4)	The Palace of Auburn Hills; 22,076	37–18
56	February 24	@ Seattle	L 79–86	Richard Hamilton (22)	Ben Wallace (17)	Okur, Robinson (4)	KeyArena at Seattle Center; 15,718	37–19
57	February 25	@ Sacramento	L 75–81	Richard Hamilton (18)	Ben Wallace (19)	Clifford Robinson (5)	ARCO Arena; 17,317	37–20
58	February 27	@ L.A. Lakers	L 85–95	Corliss Williamson (19)	Ben Wallace (8)	Robinson, Billups (3)	STAPLES Center; 18,997	37–21

March : 9–5 (home: 8–2; road: 1–3)

Game	Date	Team	Score	High points	High rebounds	High assists	Location Attendance	Record

April : 4–6 (home: 2–3; road: 2–3)

Game	Date	Team	Score	High points	High rebounds	High assists	Location Attendance	Record

2002–03 schedule

== Playoffs ==
2003 playoff game log
First Round: 4–3 (home: 3–1; road: 1–2)

Game	Date	Team	Score	High points	High rebounds	High assists	Location Attendance	Series
1	April 20	Orlando	L 94–99	Richard Hamilton (28)	Ben Wallace (13)	Chauncey Billups (8)	The Palace of Auburn Hills; 21,261	0–1
2	April 23	Orlando	W 89–77	Richard Hamilton (30)	Ben Wallace (16)	Richard Hamilton (5)	The Palace of Auburn Hills; 22,076	1–1
3	April 25	@ Orlando	L 80–89	Richard Hamilton (22)	Ben Wallace (22)	Chauncey Billups (5)	TD Waterhouse Centre; 17,283	1–2
4	April 27	@ Orlando	L 92–100	Chauncey Billups (25)	Ben Wallace (24)	Barry, Billups (3)	TD Waterhouse Centre; 17,283	1–3
5	April 30	Orlando	W 98–67	Richard Hamilton (24)	Ben Wallace (21)	Billups, Robinson (4)	The Palace of Auburn Hills; 22,076	2–3
6	May 2	@ Orlando	W 103–88	Chauncey Billups (40)	Ben Wallace (17)	Chauncey Billups (4)	TD Waterhouse Centre; 16,909	3–3
7	May 4	Orlando	W 108–93	Chauncey Billups (37)	Ben Wallace (12)	Michael Curry (6)	The Palace of Auburn Hills; 22,076	4–3

Conference semifinals: 4–2 (home: 3–0; road: 1–2)

Game	Date	Team	Score	High points	High rebounds	High assists	Location Attendance	Series
1	May 6	Philadelphia	W 98–87	Richard Hamilton (25)	Ben Wallace (12)	Billups, Robinson (4)	The Palace of Auburn Hills; 22,076	1–0
2	May 8	Philadelphia	W 104–97 (OT)	Atkins, Hamilton (23)	Ben Wallace (15)	Richard Hamilton (6)	The Palace of Auburn Hills; 22,076	2–0
3	May 10	@ Philadelphia	L 83–93	Richard Hamilton (24)	Mehmet Okur (10)	Billups, Robinson (4)	First Union Center; 20,743	2–1
4	May 11	@ Philadelphia	L 82–95	Richard Hamilton (30)	Ben Wallace (15)	three players tied (3)	First Union Center; 20,549	2–2
5	May 14	Philadelphia	W 78–77	Richard Hamilton (20)	Ben Wallace (17)	Atkins, Hamilton (5)	The Palace of Auburn Hills; 22,076	3–2
6	May 16	@ Philadelphia	W 93–89 (OT)	Chauncey Billups (28)	Ben Wallace (18)	Chauncey Billups (5)	First Union Center; 20,888	4–2

Conference finals: 0–4 (home: 0–2; road: 0–2)

Game	Date	Team	Score	High points	High rebounds	High assists	Location Attendance	Series
1	May 18	New Jersey	L 74–76	Richard Hamilton (24)	Ben Wallace (22)	Chauncey Billups (6)	The Palace of Auburn Hills; 22,076	0–1
2	May 20	New Jersey	L 86–88	Richard Hamilton (24)	Ben Wallace (19)	Chauncey Billups (10)	The Palace of Auburn Hills; 22,076	0–2
3	May 22	@ New Jersey	L 85–97	Richard Hamilton (21)	Ben Wallace (15)	five players tied (3)	Continental Airlines Arena; 19,923	0–3
4	May 24	@ New Jersey	L 82–102	Clifford Robinson (21)	Ben Wallace (13)	Chauncey Billups (6)	Continental Airlines Arena; 19,923	0–4

2003 schedule

== Player statistics ==
Legend
GP	Games played	GS	Games started	MPG	Minutes per game
FG%	Field-goal percentage	3P%	3-point field-goal percentage	FT%	Free-throw percentage
RPG	Rebounds per game	APG	Assists per game	SPG	Steals per game
BPG	Blocks per game	PPG	Points per game

=== Season ===
Player	GP	GS	MPG	FG%	3P%	FT%	RPG	APG	SPG	BPG	PPG
Chucky Atkins	65	7	21.5	.361	.355	.816	1.5	2.7	0.4	0.1	7.1
Jon Barry	80	0	18.4	.450	.407	.860	2.3	2.6	0.8	0.2	6.9
Chauncey Billups	74	74	31.4	.421	.392	.878	3.7	3.9	0.9	0.2	16.2
Michael Curry	78	77	19.9	.402	.296	.800	1.6	1.3	0.6	0.1	3.0
Hubert Davis	43	1	7.6	.392	.333	.833	0.8	0.7	0.1	0.0	1.8
Richard Hamilton	82	82	32.2	.443	.269	.833	3.9	2.5	0.8	0.2	19.7
Danny Manning	13	0	6.8	.406	.375	.833	1.4	0.5	0.7	0.2	2.6
Mehmet Okur	72	9	19.0	.426	.339	.773	4.7	1.0	0.3	0.5	6.9
Tayshaun Prince	42	5	10.4	.449	.426	.647	1.1	0.6	0.2	0.3	3.3
Željko Rebrača	30	12	16.3	.552	----	.792	3.1	0.3	0.2	0.6	6.6
Don Reid	1	0	10.0	.000	---	.500	0.0	0.0	0.0	0.0	1.0
Clifford Robinson	81	69	34.9	.398	.336	.676	3.9	3.3	1.1	1.1	12.2
Pepe Sánchez	9	0	4.1	.000	---	----	0.7	0.9	0.6	0.0	0.0
Ben Wallace	73	73	39.4	.481	.167	.450	15.4	1.6	1.4	3.2	6.9
Corliss Williamson	82	1	25.1	.453	.182	.790	4.4	1.3	0.5	0.3	12.0

=== Playoffs ===
Player	GP	GS	MPG	FG%	3P%	FT%	RPG	APG	SPG	BPG	PPG
Chucky Atkins	17	3	18.4	.352	.367	.808	1.2	1.5	1.0	.0	6.1
Jon Barry	14	0	12.3	.426	.455	1.000	1.7	1.4	.6	.1	5.0
Chauncey Billups	14	14	34.6	.374	.310	.933	3.4	4.7	.6	.1	18.0
Michael Curry	15	14	18.3	.364	.333	.857	1.1	1.1	.5	.1	2.7
Richard Hamilton	17	17	38.8	.442	.333	.906	3.9	2.6	.8	.1	22.5
Danny Manning	4	0	3.5	.333	.000		.8	.0	.0	.3	.5
Mehmet Okur	17	0	19.0	.438	.538	.531	4.1	.8	.7	.7	5.5
Tayshaun Prince	15	3	25.5	.426	.292	.763	3.8	1.5	.5	.9	9.4
Željko Rebrača	4	0	7.3	.353		.714	1.3	.0	.0	.0	4.3
Clifford Robinson	17	17	30.9	.358	.373	.595	2.7	2.9	.9	.8	9.3
Ben Wallace	17	17	42.5	.486	.000	.446	16.3	1.6	2.5	3.1	8.9
Corliss Williamson	15	0	15.5	.411		.741	2.2	1.0	.3	.2	7.8

Player statistics citation:

== Awards and records ==
- Ben Wallace, NBA Defensive Player of the Year Award
- Joe Dumars, NBA Executive of the Year Award
- Ben Wallace, All-NBA Second Team
- Ben Wallace, NBA All-Defensive First Team

== Transactions ==
=== Trades ===
September 11, 2002	To Washington Wizards Brian Cardinal; Jerry Stackhouse; Ratko Varda	To Detroit Pistons Hubert Davis; Richard Hamilton; Bobby Simmons

October 1, 2002	To Denver Nuggets Rodney White	To Detroit Pistons Mengke Bateer; Don Reid; 2004 first-round pick

October 3, 2002	To San Antonio Spurs Mengke Bateer	To Detroit Pistons 2003 second-round pick

=== Free agents ===
Additions
Player	Date signed	Former team
Chauncey Billups	July 17	Minnesota Timberwolves
Pepe Sánchez	October 10	Panathinaikos
Danny Manning	February 5	Dallas Mavericks

Subtractions
Player	Date signed	New Team
Mikki Moore	August 5	Boston Celtics
Bobby Simmons	September 24	Washington Wizards

Player Transactions Citation:

== See also ==
- 2002–03 NBA season
