= Desmond Mason =

American basketball player (born 1977)

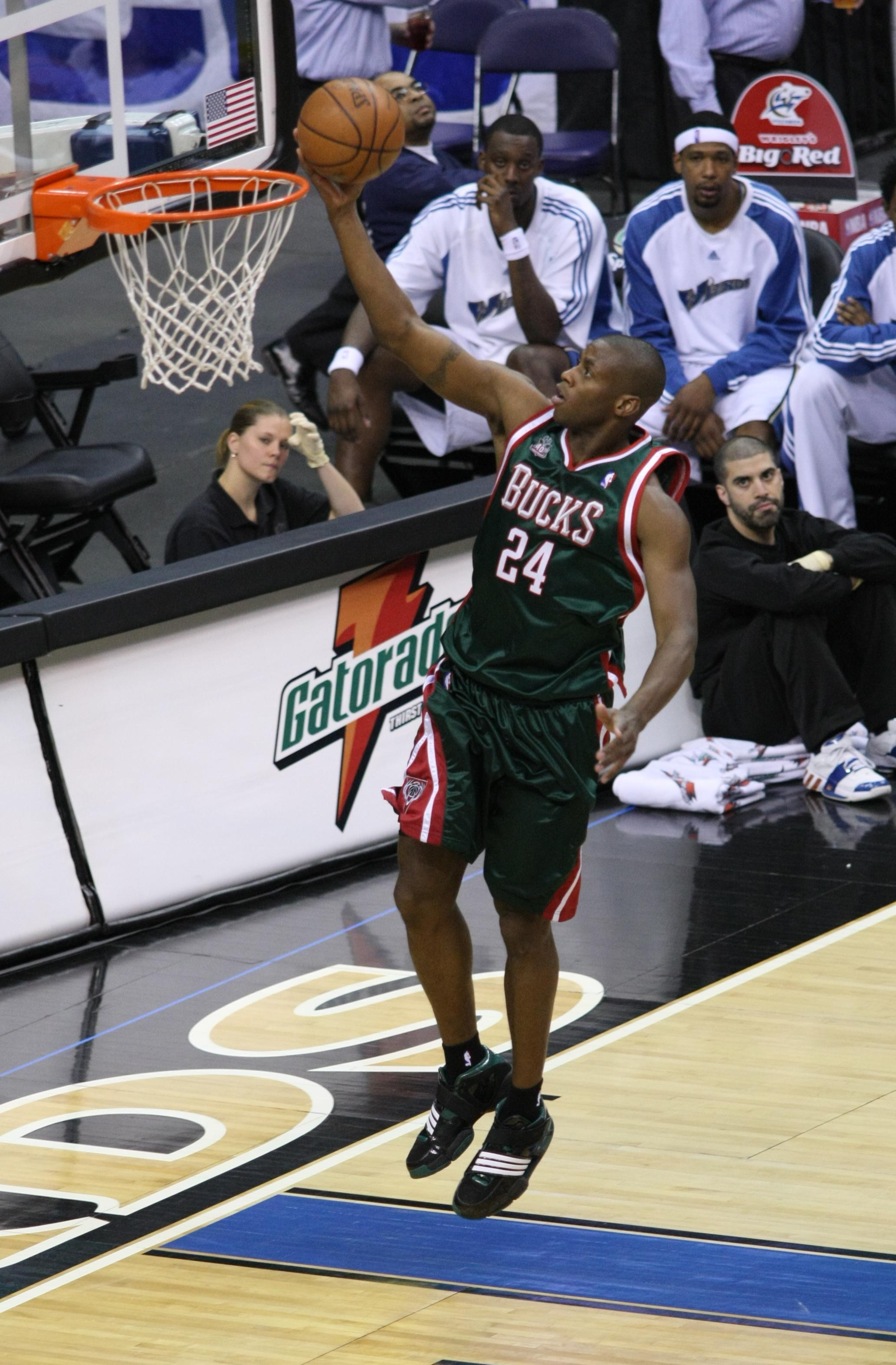
- Mason with the Milwaukee Bucks in 2008

Personal information
- Born: October 11, 1977 (age 49) Waxahachie, Texas, U.S.
- Listed height: 6 ft 5 in (1.96 m)
- Listed weight: 222 lb (101 kg)

Career information
- High school: Waxahachie (Waxahachie, Texas)
- College: Oklahoma State (1996–2000)
- NBA draft: 2000: 1st round, 17th overall pick
- Drafted by: Seattle SuperSonics
- Playing career: 2000–2009
- Position: Small forward / shooting guard
- Number: 24, 34

Career history
- 2000–2003: Seattle SuperSonics
- 2003–2005: Milwaukee Bucks
- 2005–2007: New Orleans Hornets
- 2007–2008: Milwaukee Bucks
- 2008–2009: Oklahoma City Thunder
- 2009: Sacramento Kings

Career highlights
- NBA Slam Dunk Contest champion (2001); NBA All-Rookie Second Team (2001)

Career NBA statistics
- Points: 7,767 (12.1 ppg)
- Rebounds: 2,863 (4.5 rpg)
- Assists: 1,049 (1.6 apg)
- Stats at NBA.com
- Stats at Basketball Reference

Desmond Tremaine Mason (born October 11, 1977) is an American painter and former professional basketball player. He played as a shooting guard and small forward. Mason has also found success as an artist, working in a variety of media. He has served as an NBA analyst and sports radio co-host for The Franchise, a sports talk station in Oklahoma City.

== Professional career ==
=== Seattle SuperSonics (2000–2003) ===
Desmond Mason was drafted out of Oklahoma State University by the Seattle SuperSonics with the 17th pick of the 2000 NBA draft. In 2001, he became the first SuperSonics' player in franchise history to win the NBA Slam Dunk Contest. He also finished in second place in the 2003 contest behind Jason Richardson.

=== Milwaukee Bucks (2003–2005) ===
In 2003, Mason and Gary Payton were traded to the Milwaukee Bucks in exchange for Ray Allen, Ronald Murray, and Kevin Ollie. The trade would be remembered as one of the worst trades in Milwaukee sports history, Payton left as a free agent the following offseason and while Mason showed improvement from his Seattle days, he was no replacement for all-star-level Allen. At least one life-long Milwaukee fan, the noteworthy JPC, has been quoted on Mason's tenure with the Bucks, "Yeah, but man could he fly!" On November 30, 2004, Mason led all scorers with 32 points in a 95–90 loss against the Los Angeles Lakers.

=== New Orleans Hornets (2005–2007) ===
On October 26, 2005, Mason was traded, along with a first-round draft pick in the 2006 NBA draft, to the New Orleans Hornets in exchange for Jamaal Magloire. On January 6, 2007, Mason scored 28 points in a Hornets loss against the Indiana Pacers.

=== Second stint with Milwaukee (2007–2008) ===
On July 23, 2007, Mason signed a contract with the Bucks after a two-season absence. Initially angry with Bucks general manager Larry Harris for trading him in 2005, Mason said he was happy to be back in Milwaukee.

=== Oklahoma City Thunder (2008–2009) ===
On August 13, 2008, Mason was traded to the Oklahoma City Thunder (the relocated Seattle SuperSonics franchise) in a three-team, six-player deal involving the Thunder, the Milwaukee Bucks and the Cleveland Cavaliers, that sent Milwaukee's Mo Williams to Cleveland, Mason and Cleveland's Joe Smith to Oklahoma City, and Cleveland's Damon Jones and Oklahoma City's Luke Ridnour and Adrian Griffin to Milwaukee.

=== Sacramento Kings (2009) ===
On September 17, 2009, Mason signed a contract with the Sacramento Kings at league minimum. After playing in just five games (starting four), he was waived by the Kings. Mason's final NBA game was played on November 4, 2009, in a 105–113 loss to the Atlanta Hawks. In that game, Mason played three-and-a-half minutes and recorded no stats other than a foul.

== Media appearances ==
In February 2007, Mason recorded a hip-hop video called We Dem Hornets in which he gave an inspirational roll-call of the entire 2006–07 Hornets team. He said: "Brandon (Bass) and I write a lot on the bus... I wrote a song about the team and let them listen to it. I rapped it to them on the bus and on the plane and a lot of the guys really liked it. I tweaked it, cleaned it up, and went over to (videographer intern and son of head coach Byron Scott) Thomas Scott's house and we put it down and then they wanted to put a video to it. It was just for fun." Commenting on the fact that the Hornets started to win after the video was shown, Mason commented: "I think it went over well. They showed it in the locker room and everybody liked it, all of the players liked it. It was done well and (the highlights) fit together really well."

In July 2018, Mason also appeared as a guest on a chartered yacht on season 3 of the show Below Deck Mediterranean, initially in an episode entitled "Panic at the Deck-O" on the Bravo network in the United States.

== NBA career statistics ==
Legend
GP	Games played	GS	Games started	MPG	Minutes per game
FG%	Field goal percentage	3P%	3-point field goal percentage	FT%	Free throw percentage
RPG	Rebounds per game	APG	Assists per game	SPG	Steals per game
BPG	Blocks per game	PPG	Points per game	**Bold**	Career high

=== Regular season ===
Year	Team	GP	GS	MPG	FG%	3P%	FT%	RPG	APG	SPG	BPG	PPG
2000–01	Seattle	78	14	19.5	.431	.269	.736	3.2	.8	.5	.3	5.9
2001–02	Seattle	75	20	32.3	.464	.271	**.848**	4.7	1.4	**.9**	.4	12.4
2002–03	Seattle	52	15	34.8	.436	.291	.740	6.4	1.8	**.9**	.4	14.1
2002–03	Milwaukee	28	25	34.0	.474	**.294**	.765	**6.7**	2.4	.7	.4	14.8
2003–04	Milwaukee	**82**	31	30.9	.472	.231	.769	4.4	1.9	.7	.3	14.4
2004–05	Milwaukee	80	71	**36.2**	.443	.125	.802	3.9	**2.7**	.7	.3	**17.2**
2005–06	New Orleans/Oklahoma City	70	55	30.0	.399	.167	.682	4.3	.9	.6	.2	10.8
2006–07	New Orleans/Oklahoma City	75	**75**	34.3	.452	.000	.663	4.6	1.5	.7	.3	13.7
2007–08	Milwaukee	59	56	28.8	**.482**	.000	.659	4.3	2.1	.7	.5	9.7
2008–09	Oklahoma City	39	19	27.3	.435	.000	.541	4.0	1.2	.4	**.8**	7.5
2009–10	Sacramento	5	4	13.2	.417	.000	.750	2.6	.4	.2	.2	2.6
Career		643	385	30.5	.449	.260	.740	4.5	1.6	.7	.4	12.1

=== Playoffs ===
Year	Team	GP	GS	MPG	FG%	3P%	FT%	RPG	APG	SPG	BPG	PPG
2002	Seattle	5	5	**41.0**	.421	**.333**	.588	6.2	1.8	.8	.4	11.8
2003	Milwaukee	**6**	**6**	34.0	**.509**	.000	.710	**7.0**	.8	**1.0**	**.7**	13.0
2004	Milwaukee	5	5	39.6	.338	.000	**.846**	4.8	**2.4**	.8	.4	**14.4**
Career		16	16	37.9	.414	.111	.730	6.1	1.6	.9	.5	13.1

== Artwork ==
Mason majored in studio art in college, and at one point considered becoming an art teacher. He works with a variety of media, such as oil paint, acrylic paint, watercolors, and ceramics. In 2004, he founded the Desmond Mason Art Show, which supports a variety of charitable organizations. His works have been on display at museums and galleries, such as the Gaylord-Pickens Oklahoma Heritage Museum.

Mason has been described as an abstract expressionist. "I paint by emotion so everything I create is a piece of me to some extent", he said in 2013.

Mason helped make a series of art murals in Milwaukee following the Bucks’ NBA championship win in 2021.

== Legal issues ==
On May 7, 2026, Mason was arrested in Oklahoma City on charges of committing felony theft in Texas. In a statement issued by the Melissa Police Department in Collin County, Texas, a couple filed a police report in January 2026 where they admitted to paying Mason $9822.86 in March 2025 to frame a piece of sports memorabilia. This memorabilia and its associated authentication documents, which Mason obtained and then repeatedly failed to deliver to the couple, were acknowledged to be valued at around $40,000. As of May 13, 2026, Mason remains in custody and is currently being held without bond.
