= 2002–03 Boston Celtics season =

Season of National Basketball Association team the Boston Celtics

- Head coach: Jim O'Brien
- General manager: Chris Wallace
- Owners: Boston Basketball Partners
- Arena: FleetCenter

Results
- Record: 44–38 (.537)
- Place: Division: 3rd (Atlantic); Conference: 6th (Eastern)
- Playoff finish: Conference semifinals (lost to Nets 0–4)
- Stats at Basketball Reference

Local media
- Television: Fox Sports Net New England
- Radio: WWZN

The 2002–03 Boston Celtics season was the 57th season for the Boston Celtics in the National Basketball Association.

== Season summary ==
=== Off-season ===
During the off-season, the Celtics acquired Vin Baker and Shammond Williams from the Seattle SuperSonics, and signed free agent, and undrafted rookie point guard J.R. Bremer. The franchise also gained new owners during this season when Paul Gaston sold the team to the Boston Basketball Partners, represented by Wyc Grousbeck, in the fall of 2002.

=== Regular season ===
After losing their first two games of the regular season, the Celtics posted a six-game winning streak afterwards, and got off to a solid 16–7 start to the season, as the team later on held a 27–22 record at the All-Star break. At mid-season, the team traded Shammond Williams to the Denver Nuggets in exchange for former Celtics center Mark Blount. The Celtics posted a six-game losing streak in March, and finished in third place in the Atlantic Division with a 44–38 record, earning the sixth seed in the Eastern Conference.

Paul Pierce averaged 25.9 points, 7.3 rebounds, 4.4 assists and 1.8 steals per game, and also contributed 118 three-point field goals, but struggled only shooting .302 in three-point field-goal percentage, and was named to the All-NBA Third Team; Antoine Walker averaged 20.1 points, 7.2 rebounds, 4.8 assists and 1.5 steals per game, and led the Celtics with 188 three-point field goals, despite only shooting .323 in three-point field-goal percentage. In addition, Tony Delk contributed 9.8 points per game and 120 three-point field goals, while Eric Williams provided the team with 9.1 points and 4.7 rebounds per game, Bremer contributed 8.3 points and 2.6 assists per game, along with 101 three-point field goals, and was named to the NBA All-Rookie Second Team, and Tony Battie provided with 7.3 points, 6.5 rebounds per and 1.2 blocks per game. Meanwhile, Walter McCarty contributed 6.1 points per game, Baker averaged 5.2 points and 3.8 rebounds per game, but only played 52 games due to injury, and Blount provided with 4.4 points and 4.6 rebounds per game in 27 games after the trade.

During the NBA All-Star weekend at the Philips Arena in Atlanta, Georgia, Pierce and Walker were both selected for the 2003 NBA All-Star Game, as members of the Eastern Conference All-Star team; it was the third and final All-Star appearance for Walker. In addition, Walker also participated in the NBA Three-Point Shootout. Pierce also finished tied in eleventh place in Most Valuable Player voting.

The Celtics finished 13th in the NBA in home-game attendance, with an attendance of 709,049 at the FleetCenter during the regular season.

=== NBA playoffs ===
In the Eastern Conference First Round of the 2003 NBA playoffs, the Celtics faced off against the 3rd–seeded Indiana Pacers, who were led by the trio of All-Star forward Jermaine O'Neal, All-Star center Brad Miller, and Ron Artest. Despite the Pacers having home-court advantage in the series, the Celtics took a 3–1 series lead after winning Game 4 over the Pacers at home, 102–92 at the FleetCenter. After losing Game 5 on the road in overtime, 93–88 at the Conseco Fieldhouse, the Celtics won Game 6 over the Pacers at the FleetCenter, 110–90 to win the series in six games.

In the Eastern Conference Semi-finals, and for the second consecutive year, the team faced off against the 2nd–seeded, and Atlantic Division champion New Jersey Nets, who were led by the trio of All-Star guard Jason Kidd, Kenyon Martin, and second-year star Richard Jefferson. The Celtics lost the first two games to the Nets on the road at the Continental Airlines Arena, and then lost the next two games at home, including a Game 4 loss to the Nets at the FleetCenter in double-overtime, 110–101, thus losing the series in a four-game sweep.

The Nets would advance to the NBA Finals for the second consecutive year, but would lose to the San Antonio Spurs in six games in the 2003 NBA Finals.

=== Aftermath ===
This was also Walker's final season with the Celtics, as he and Delk were both traded to the Dallas Mavericks the following off-season; Walker would return to the Celtics midway through the 2004–05 season. Meanwhile, Bremer was traded to the Cleveland Cavaliers.

== Draft picks ==
Round	Pick	Player	Position	Nationality	College
2	50	Darius Songaila (traded to Sacramento)	PF	Lithuania	Wake Forest

== Roster ==
2002–03 Boston Celtics roster
Players

Pos.	No.	Player	Height	Weight	DOB	From
F/C	42	Vin Baker	6 ft 11 in (2.11 m)	232 lb (105 kg)	1971–11–23	Hartford
C	4	Tony Battie	6 ft 11 in (2.11 m)	240 lb (109 kg)	1976–02–11	Texas Tech
C	30	Mark Blount	7 ft 0 in (2.13 m)	250 lb (113 kg)	1975–11–30	Pittsburgh
G	9	J. R. Bremer	6 ft 2 in (1.88 m)	185 lb (84 kg)	1980–09–19	St. Bonaventure
F	5	Kedrick Brown	6 ft 7 in (2.01 m)	222 lb (101 kg)	1981–03–18	Northwest Florida State
F	11	Mark Bryant	6 ft 9 in (2.06 m)	245 lb (111 kg)	1965–04–25	Seton Hall
G	12	Bimbo Coles	6 ft 1 in (1.85 m)	180 lb (82 kg)	1968–04–22	Virginia Tech
G	7	Tony Delk	6 ft 1 in (1.85 m)	189 lb (86 kg)	1974–01–28	Kentucky
F	43	Grant Long	6 ft 8 in (2.03 m)	225 lb (102 kg)	1966–03–12	Eastern Michigan
F	0	Walter McCarty	6 ft 10 in (2.08 m)	230 lb (104 kg)	1974–02–01	Kentucky
G/F	34	Paul Pierce	6 ft 7 in (2.01 m)	235 lb (107 kg)	1977–10–13	Kansas
C	41	Bruno Šundov	7 ft 2 in (2.18 m)	220 lb (100 kg)	1980–02–10	The Winchendon School (HS)
F	8	Antoine Walker	6 ft 8 in (2.03 m)	224 lb (102 kg)	1976–08–12	Kentucky
F	55	Eric Williams	6 ft 8 in (2.03 m)	220 lb (100 kg)	1972–07–17	Providence

Coaches
Head coach
- Jim O'Brien
Assistant(s)
- John Carroll
- Lester Conner
- Joe Gallagher
- Dick Harter
- Frank Vogel

Legend
- (DP) Unsigned draft pick
- (FA) Free agent
- (S) Suspended
- Injured

Roster
Updated: 2003–04–13

== Regular season ==
=== Standings ===
Atlantic Division	W	L	PCT	GB	Home	Road	Div
y-New Jersey Nets	49	33	.598	–	33–8	16–25	16–8
x-Philadelphia 76ers	48	34	.585	1	25–16	23–18	17–7
x-Boston Celtics	44	38	.537	5	25–16	19–22	13–12
x-Orlando Magic	42	40	.512	7	26–15	16–25	14–11
e-Washington Wizards	37	45	.451	12	23–18	14–27	11–13
e-New York Knicks	37	45	.451	12	24–17	13–28	9–15
e-Miami Heat	25	57	.305	24	16–25	9–32	5–19

#	Eastern Conference				
#	Team	W	L	PCT	GB
1	c-Detroit Pistons	50	32	.610	–
2	y-New Jersey Nets	49	33	.598	1
3	x-Indiana Pacers	48	34	.585	2
4	x-Philadelphia 76ers	48	34	.585	2
5	x-New Orleans Hornets	47	35	.573	3
6	x-Boston Celtics	44	38	.537	6
7	x-Milwaukee Bucks	42	40	.512	8
8	x-Orlando Magic	42	40	.512	8
9	e-New York Knicks	37	45	.451	13
10	e-Washington Wizards	37	45	.451	13
11	e-Atlanta Hawks	35	47	.427	15
12	e-Chicago Bulls	30	52	.366	20
13	e-Miami Heat	25	57	.305	25
14	e-Toronto Raptors	24	58	.293	26
15	e-Cleveland Cavaliers	17	65	.207	33

=== Game log ===
2002-03 game log
Total: 44–38 (home: 25–16; road: 19–22)
October (home: 0-1; road: 0-1)

Game	Date	Opponent	Score	Location	Record
1	October 30	Chicago Bulls	L 96-99	FleetCenter	0–1
2	October 31	@ Washington Wizards	L 69-114	MCI Center	0–2

November (home: 6-2; road: 4-1)

Game	Date	Opponent	Score	Location	Record
3	November 2	@ New York Knicks	W 117-107	Madison Square Garden	1–2
4	November 6	@ Chicago Bulls	W 91-69	United Center	2-2
5	November 7	Los Angeles Lakers	W 98-95 (OT)	FleetCenter	3–2
6	November 9	@ Minnesota Timberwolves	W 105-99	Target Center	4–2
7	November 11	Utah Jazz	W 112-95	FleetCenter	5-2
8	November 13	Philadelphia 76ers	W 91-81	FleetCenter	6–2
9	November 15	Dallas Mavericks	L 86-97	FleetCenter	6–3
10	November 16	@ Milwaukee Bucks	L 85-104	Bradley Center	6–4
11	November 20	New Jersey Nets	W 96-79	FleetCenter	7–4
12	November 22	Atlanta Hawks	W 105-98 (20T)	FleetCenter	8–4
13	November 23	@ Atlanta Hawks	W 109-99	Philips Arena	9–4
14	November 27	Chicago Bulls	W 92-82	FleetCenter	10–4
15	November 29	Toronto Raptors	L 95-98	FleetCenter	10–5

December (home: 6-2; road: 3-5)

Game	Date	Opponent	Score	Location	Record
16	December 1	New Orleans Hornets	W 95-86	FleetCenter	11–5
17	December 2	@ Orlando Magic	W 102-97	TD Waterhouse Centre	12–5
18	December 4	@ Philadelphia 76ers	L 93-99	First Union Center	12–6
19	December 6	New York Knicks	W 91-80	FleetCenter	13–6
20	December 9	Orlando Magic	W 114-109 (OT)	FleetCenter	14–6
21	December 11	Phoenix Suns	L 94-103	FleetCenter	14–7
22	December 13	Cleveland Cavaliers	W 115-100	FleetCenter	15–7
23	December 14	@ New York Knicks	W 113-90	Madison Square Garden	16–7
24	December 16	@ Chicago Bulls	L 92-98	United Center	16–8
25	December 18	Miami Heat	L 81-91	FleetCenter	16–9
26	December 20	Minnesota Timberwolves	W 108-99	FleetCenter	17–9
27	December 21	@ Cleveland Cavaliers	W 89-82	Gund Arena	18–9
28	December 25	@ New Jersey Nets	L 81-117	Continental Airlines Arena	18–10
29	December 27	@ Miami Heat	L 70-90	American Airlines Arena	18–11
30	December 28	@ Orlando Magic	L 95-101	TD Waterhouse Centre	18–12
31	December 31	Memphis Grizzlies	W 96-89	FleetCenter	19–12

January (home: 4-4; road: 3-4)

Game	Date	Opponent	Score	Location	Record
32	January 3	Portland Trail Blazers	L 103-108	FleetCenter	19–13
33	January 6	Washington Wizards	L 95-100	FleetCenter	19–14
34	January 8	@ New Orleans Hornets	W 93-83	New Orleans Arena	20–14
35	January 10	@ Dallas Mavericks	L 78-103	American Airlines Center	20–15
36	January 12	@ San Antonio Spurs	L 80-81	SBC Center	20–16
37	January 13	@ Houston Rockets	L 92-101	Compaq Center	20–17
38	January 15	Atlanta Hawks	W 86-66	FleetCenter	21–17
39	January 17	Indiana Pacers	W 98-93	FleetCenter	22–17
40	January 18	@ Milwaukee Bucks	W 97-95	Bradley Center	23–17
41	January 20	@ Philadelphia 76ers	W 100-99	First Union Center	24–17
42	January 22	Milwaukee Bucks	L 97-106	FleetCenter	24–18
43	January 24	Denver Nuggets	W 77-58	FleetCenter	25–18
44	January 26	Orlando Magic	W 91-83	FleetCenter	26–18
45	January 28	@ Detroit Pistons	L 83-86	The Palace of Auburn Hills	26–19
46	January 31	Detroit Pistons	L 66-118	FleetCenter	26–20

February (home: 3-1; road: 4-4)

Game	Date	Opponent	Score	Location	Record
47	February 1	@ Indiana Pacers	l 100-109	Conseco Fieldhouse	26–21
48	February 3	@ New Orleans Hornets	L 96-103	New Orleans Arena	26–22
49	February 5	Seattle SuperSonics	W 114-74	FleetCenter	27–22
50	February 11	@ Seattle SuperSonics	W 82-76	KeyArena at Seattle Center	28–22
51	February 13	@ Portland Trail Blazers	W 100-92	Rose Garden	29–22
52	February 15	@ Los Angeles Clippers	W 92-84	Staples Center	30–22
53	February 16	@ Phoenix Suns	L 92-102	America West Arena	30–23
54	February 18	@ Golden State Warriors	W 125-117	The Arena in Oakland	31–23
55	February 20	@ Sacramento Kings	L 83-105	ARCO Arena	31–24
56	February 24	Houston Rockets	L 95-101 (OT)	FleetCenter	31–25
57	February 26	Indiana Pacers	W 71-69	FleetCenter	32–25
58	February 28	Toronto Raptors	W 90-85	FleetCenter	33–25

March (home: 4-3; road: 3-6)

Game	Date	Opponent	Score	Location	Record
59	March 2	@ Toronto Raptors	L 92-104	Air Canada Centre	33–26
60	March 3	@ Memphis Grizzlies	W 111-110	The Pyramid	34–26
61	March 5	New York Knicks	W 97-95	FleetCenter	35–26
62	March 7	Los Angeles Clippers	W 83-72	FleetCenter	36–26
63	March 9	San Antonio Spurs	L 78-94	FleetCenter	36–27
64	March 12	New Orleans Hornets	W 93-65	FleetCenter	37–27
65	March 13	@ New Jersey Nets	L 75-90	Continental Airlines Arena	37–28
66	March 15	@ Detroit Pistons	W 81-71	The Palace of Auburn Hills	38–28
67	March 18	New Jersey Nets	L 74-87	FleetCenter	38–29
68	March 19	@ Indiana Pacers	L 72-102	Conseco Fieldhouse	38–30
69	March 21	@ Los Angeles Lakers	L 96-104	Staples Center	38–31
70	March 22	@ Denver Nuggets	L 80-90	Pepsi Center	38–32
71	March 24	@ Utah Jazz	L 91-96	Delta Center	38–33
72	March 26	Golden State Warriors	L 95-107	FleetCenter	38–34
73	March 28	Cleveland Cavaliers	W 104-95	FleetCenter	39–34
74	March 29	@ Cleveland Cavaliers	W 110-106	FleetCenter	40–34

April (home: 2-3; road: 2-1)

Game	Date	Opponent	Score	Location	Record
75	April 2	Miami Heat	W 90-62	FleetCenter	41–34
76	April 4	Sacramento Kings	L 92-93	FleetCenter	41–35
77	April 6	Washington Wizards	L 98-99 (OT)	FleetCenter	41–36
78	April 9	@ Washington Wizards	W 87-83	MCI Center	42–36
79	April 10	Philadelphia 76ers	L 78-99	FleetCenter	42–37
80	April 12	@ Orlando Magic	L 86-89	TD Waterhouse Centre	42–38
81	April 13	@ Miami Heat	W 94-86	American Airlines Arena	43–38
82	April 16	Detroit Pistons	W 99-92	FleetCenter	44–38

2002-03 Schedule

== Playoffs ==
2003 playoff game log
First Round: 4–2 (home: 3–0; road: 1–2)

Game	Date	Team	Score	High points	High rebounds	High assists	Location Attendance	Series
1	April 19	@ Indiana	W 103–100	Paul Pierce (40)	Paul Pierce (11)	Paul Pierce (6)	Conseco Fieldhouse; 16,380	1–0
2	April 21	@ Indiana	L 77–89	Antoine Walker (19)	Tony Battie (11)	Paul Pierce (6)	Conseco Fieldhouse; 15,881	1–1
3	April 24	Indiana	W 101–83	Paul Pierce (21)	Paul Pierce (12)	Walter McCarty (6)	FleetCenter; 18,624	2–1
4	April 27	Indiana	W 102–92	Paul Pierce (37)	Antoine Walker (11)	Paul Pierce (7)	FleetCenter; 18,624	3–1
5	April 29	@ Indiana	L 88–93 (OT)	Antoine Walker (21)	Eric Williams (8)	Paul Pierce (8)	Conseco Fieldhouse; 15,326	3–2
6	May 1	Indiana	W 110–90	Paul Pierce (27)	Pierce, Williams (8)	Antoine Walker (5)	FleetCenter; 18,624	4–2

Conference Semifinals: 0–4 (home: 0–2; road: 0–2)

Game	Date	Team	Score	High points	High rebounds	High assists	Location Attendance	Series
1	May 5	@ New Jersey	L 93–97	Paul Pierce (34)	Antoine Walker (8)	Paul Pierce (8)	Continental Airlines Arena; 17,343	0–1
2	May 7	@ New Jersey	L 95–104	Paul Pierce (32)	Paul Pierce (10)	Paul Pierce (11)	Continental Airlines Arena; 19,934	0–2
3	May 9	New Jersey	L 76–94	Paul Pierce (23)	Antoine Walker (15)	Tony Delk (6)	FleetCenter; 18,624	0–3
4	May 12	New Jersey	L 101–110 (2OT)	Paul Pierce (27)	Paul Pierce (10)	Pierce, Walker (7)	FleetCenter; 18,624	0–4

2003 schedule

== Player statistics ==
Legend
GP	Games played	GS	Games started	MPG	Minutes per game
FG%	Field-goal percentage	3P%	3-point field-goal percentage	FT%	Free-throw percentage
RPG	Rebounds per game	APG	Assists per game	SPG	Steals per game
BPG	Blocks per game	PPG	Points per game

=== Regular season ===
Boston Celtics statistics
Player	GP	GS	MPG	FG%	3P%	FT%	RPG	APG	SPG	BPG	PPG
Vin Baker	52	9	18.1	.478	.000	.673	3.8	.6	.4	.6	5.2
Tony Battie	67	62	25.1	.539	.200	.746	6.5	.7	.5	1.2	7.3
Mark Blount^{†}	27	7	19.2	.563		.750	4.6	.8	.7	.6	4.4
J. R. Bremer	64	41	23.5	.369	.353	.766	2.3	2.6	.6	.0	8.3
Kedrick Brown	51	5	13.1	.357	.077	.625	2.7	.4	.7	.3	2.8
Mark Bryant^{†}	2	0	4.5	.000			1.0	.5	.0	.0	.0
Bimbo Coles^{†}	14	0	12.5	.449	.000	1.000	.8	1.1	.4	.0	3.7
Tony Delk	67	39	28.0	.416	.395	.782	3.5	2.2	1.1	.1	9.8
Grant Long	41	1	11.9	.386	.000	.783	2.0	.6	.2	.0	1.8
Walter McCarty	82	8	23.8	.414	.367	.622	3.5	1.3	1.0	.3	6.1
Mikki Moore^{†}	3	0	4.0	.000			.3	.0	.0	.7	.0
Paul Pierce	79	79	39.2	.416	.302	.802	7.3	4.4	1.8	.8	25.9
Bruno Šundov	26	0	5.3	.250	.250	.000	1.1	.3	.2	.1	1.2
Antoine Walker	78	78	41.5	.388	.323	.615	7.2	4.8	1.5	.4	20.1
Eric Williams	82	79	28.7	.442	.336	.750	4.7	1.7	1.0	.2	9.1
Shammond Williams^{†}	51	2	22.9	.396	.352	.842	2.2	2.5	1.2	.1	7.3
Rubén Wolkowyski	7	0	3.4	.500	.000	.250	.1	.1	.0	.0	.7

=== Playoffs ===
Boston Celtics statistics
Player	GP	GS	MPG	FG%	3P%	FT%	RPG	APG	SPG	BPG	PPG
Tony Battie	10	10	21.3	.564	.000	.500	4.9	.5	.4	1.4	6.6
Mark Blount	10	0	14.4	.545		.700	3.6	.2	1.1	.8	3.1
J. R. Bremer	10	0	14.7	.286	.250	.875	1.5	1.2	.3	.0	4.7
Kedrick Brown	3	0	3.7	.250		.500	.7	.0	.3	.0	1.0
Mark Bryant	1	0	2.0				.0	.0	.0	.0	.0
Bimbo Coles	3	0	3.0	.000	.000		.3	.7	.0	.0	.0
Tony Delk	10	10	36.8	.474	.449	.875	4.7	3.6	1.2	.4	15.8
Grant Long	8	0	4.3	.250			.6	.1	.0	.0	.3
Walter McCarty	10	8	35.2	.480	.404	.857	4.3	2.2	.8	.5	9.9
Paul Pierce	10	10	44.5	.399	.356	.863	9.0	6.7	2.1	.8	27.1
Antoine Walker	10	10	44.0	.415	.356	.500	8.7	4.3	1.7	.4	17.3
Eric Williams	10	2	31.0	.375	.200	.794	3.2	1.7	.9	.0	9.6

- ^{†} Denotes player spent time with another team in the season. Stats reflect time with the Celtics only.

Player statistics citation:

== See also ==
- Reebok Pro Summer League, a summer league hosted by the Celtics
