= 2002–03 Orlando Magic season =

NBA professional basketball team season

- Head coach: Doc Rivers
- President: Bob Vander Weide
- General manager: John Gabriel
- Owner: Richard DeVos
- Arena: TD Waterhouse Centre

Results
- Record: 42–40 (.512)
- Place: Division: 4th (Atlantic); Conference: 8th (Eastern)
- Playoff finish: First round (lost to Pistons 3–4)
- Stats at Basketball Reference

Local media
- Television: Sunshine Network; WBRW

The 2002–03 Orlando Magic season was the 14th season for the Orlando Magic in the National Basketball Association.

== Season summary ==
=== Off-season ===
During the off-season, the Magic signed free agents, former All-Star forward Shawn Kemp and Jacque Vaughn.

=== Regular season ===
However, Grant Hill only played just 29 games due to his continuing ankle injuries, and Horace Grant only played just five games due to a sore left knee, and was released to free agency after feuding with head coach Doc Rivers. With the addition of Kemp and Vaughn, the Magic won five of their first six games of the regular season, but then lost six of their next eight games afterwards. The team fell below .500 in winning percentage, and held a 24–26 record at the All-Star break. At mid-season, the Magic traded Mike Miller to the Memphis Grizzlies in exchange for rookie power forward Drew Gooden, and rookie small forward Gordan Giriček. The Magic played above .500 for the remainder of the season, and finished in fourth place in the Atlantic Division with a 42–40 record, earning the eighth seed in the Eastern Conference.

Tracy McGrady won his first scoring title leading the league in scoring with 32.1 points, 6.5 rebounds, 5.5 assists and 1.7 steals per game per game, plus leading the Magic with 173 three-point field goals, as he was named to the All-NBA First Team. In addition, Hill averaged 14.5 points, 7.1 rebounds and 4.2 assists per game, while Giriček contributed 14.3 points per game in 27 games after the trade, and was named to the NBA All-Rookie Second Team, Gooden provided the team with 13.6 points and 8.4 rebounds per game in 19 games, and was named to the NBA All-Rookie First Team, and Pat Garrity contributed 10.7 points per game and 161 three-point field goals. Meanwhile, Darrell Armstrong provided with 9.4 points, 3.9 assists and 1.6 steals per game, while Kemp averaged 6.8 points and 5.7 rebounds per game, Vaughn contributed 5.9 points and 2.9 assists per game, and Andrew DeClercq provided with 4.7 points and 4.4 rebounds per game.

During the NBA All-Star weekend at the Philips Arena in Atlanta, Georgia, McGrady was selected for the 2003 NBA All-Star Game, as a member of the Eastern Conference All-Star team, while Garrity participated in the NBA Three-Point Shootout. McGrady finished in fourth place in Most Valuable Player voting with 4 first-place votes, and also finished tied in 18th place in Most Improved Player voting, while Gooden finished in fifth place in Rookie of the Year voting.

The Magic finished 26th in the NBA in home-game attendance, with an attendance of 605,901 at the TD Waterhouse Centre during the regular season, which was the fourth-lowest in the league.

=== NBA playoffs ===
In the Eastern Conference First Round of the 2003 NBA playoffs, the Magic faced off against the top–seeded, and Central Division champion Detroit Pistons, who were led by the trio of Richard Hamilton, Chauncey Billups, and All-Star center, and Defensive Player of the Year, Ben Wallace. Despite the Pistons having home-court advantage in the series, the Magic took a 3–1 series lead after winning Game 4 over the Pistons at home, 100–92 at the TD Waterhouse Centre. However, the Magic lost the next three games, which included a Game 7 loss to the Pistons on the road, 108–93 at The Palace of Auburn Hills, thus losing in a hard-fought seven-game series.

=== Aftermath ===
Following the season, Armstrong signed as a free agent with the New Orleans Hornets, while Grant re-signed with his former team, the Los Angeles Lakers, Vaughn re-signed with the Atlanta Hawks, and Kemp retired. After the playoff defeat, the Magic entered a state of rebuilding, and did not return to the NBA playoffs again until the 2006–07 season.

== Draft picks ==
Round	Pick	Player	Position	Nationality	College
1	18	Curtis Borchardt	C	United States	Stanford

== Roster ==
2002–03 Orlando Magic roster
Players

Pos.	No.	Player	Height	Weight	DOB	From
G	10	Darrell Armstrong	6 ft 0 in (1.83 m)	170 lb (77 kg)	1968–06–22	Fayetteville State
C	31	Pat Burke	6 ft 11 in (2.11 m)	250 lb (113 kg)	1973–12–14	Auburn
C	55	Andrew DeClercq	6 ft 10 in (2.08 m)	230 lb (104 kg)	1973–02–01	Florida
F	8	Pat Garrity	6 ft 9 in (2.06 m)	238 lb (108 kg)	1976–08–23	Notre Dame
F	7	Gordan Giriček	6 ft 6 in (1.98 m)	210 lb (95 kg)	1977–06–20	Croatia
F	9	Drew Gooden	6 ft 10 in (2.08 m)	250 lb (113 kg)	1981–09–24	Kansas
F/C	54	Horace Grant	6 ft 10 in (2.08 m)	215 lb (98 kg)	1965–07–04	Clemson
F	33	Grant Hill	6 ft 8 in (2.03 m)	225 lb (102 kg)	1972–10–05	Duke
C	34	Steven Hunter	7 ft 0 in (2.13 m)	220 lb (100 kg)	1981–10–31	DePaul
F/C	40	Shawn Kemp	6 ft 10 in (2.08 m)	230 lb (104 kg)	1969–11–26	Trinity Valley CC
G/F	1	Tracy McGrady	6 ft 8 in (2.03 m)	210 lb (95 kg)	1979–05–24	Mt. Zion HS (NC)
C	00	Olumide Oyedeji	6 ft 10 in (2.08 m)	240 lb (109 kg)	1981–05–11	Nigeria
G	5	Jeryl Sasser	6 ft 6 in (1.98 m)	200 lb (91 kg)	1979–02–13	SMU
G	11	Jacque Vaughn	6 ft 1 in (1.85 m)	190 lb (86 kg)	1975–02–11	Kansas
G	12	Chris Whitney	6 ft 0 in (1.83 m)	168 lb (76 kg)	1971–10–05	Clemson

Coaches
Head coach
- Doc Rivers
Assistant(s)
- Johnny Davis
- Mark Hughes
- Paul Pressey
- Dave Wohl

Legend
- (DP) Unsigned draft pick
- (FA) Free agent
- (S) Suspended
- Injured

Roster
Updated: February 28, 2003

=== Roster notes ===
- Small forward Grant Hill played 29 games (his last game being on January 16, 2003) but missed the rest of the season and the playoffs due to having left ankle problems. He was placed on the injured list on January 18, 2003, and underwent season-ending surgery in March 2003.

== Regular season ==
=== Season standings ===
Atlantic Division	W	L	PCT	GB	Home	Road	Div
y-New Jersey Nets	49	33	.598	–	33–8	16–25	16–8
x-Philadelphia 76ers	48	34	.585	1	25–16	23–18	17–7
x-Boston Celtics	44	38	.537	5	25–16	19–22	13–12
x-Orlando Magic	42	40	.512	7	26–15	16–25	14–11
e-Washington Wizards	37	45	.451	12	23–18	14–27	11–13
e-New York Knicks	37	45	.451	12	24–17	13–28	9–15
e-Miami Heat	25	57	.305	24	16–25	9–32	5–19

#	Eastern Conference				
#	Team	W	L	PCT	GB
1	c-Detroit Pistons	50	32	.610	–
2	y-New Jersey Nets	49	33	.598	1
3	x-Indiana Pacers	48	34	.585	2
4	x-Philadelphia 76ers	48	34	.585	2
5	x-New Orleans Hornets	47	35	.573	3
6	x-Boston Celtics	44	38	.537	6
7	x-Milwaukee Bucks	42	40	.512	8
8	x-Orlando Magic	42	40	.512	8
9	e-New York Knicks	37	45	.451	13
10	e-Washington Wizards	37	45	.451	13
11	e-Atlanta Hawks	35	47	.427	15
12	e-Chicago Bulls	30	52	.366	20
13	e-Miami Heat	25	57	.305	25
14	e-Toronto Raptors	24	58	.293	26
15	e-Cleveland Cavaliers	17	65	.207	33

z – clinched division title
y – clinched division title
x – clinched playoff spot

== Playoffs ==
2003 playoff game log
First Round: 3–4 (home: 2–1; road: 1–3)

Game	Date	Team	Score	High points	High rebounds	High assists	Location Attendance	Series
1	April 20	@ Detroit	W 99–94	Tracy McGrady (43)	Drew Gooden (15)	Jacque Vaughn (6)	The Palace of Auburn Hills; 21,261	1–0
2	April 23	@ Detroit	L 77–89	Tracy McGrady (46)	Drew Gooden (11)	Jacque Vaughn (6)	The Palace of Auburn Hills; 22,076	1–1
3	April 25	Detroit	W 89–80	Tracy McGrady (29)	Gooden, McGrady (7)	Darrell Armstrong (8)	TD Waterhouse Centre; 17,283	2–1
4	April 27	Detroit	W 100–92	Tracy McGrady (27)	Drew Gooden (13)	Tracy McGrady (9)	TD Waterhouse Centre; 17,283	3–1
5	April 30	@ Detroit	L 67–98	Tracy McGrady (19)	Drew Gooden (15)	Tracy McGrady (4)	The Palace of Auburn Hills; 22,076	3–2
6	May 2	Detroit	L 88–103	Tracy McGrady (37)	Drew Gooden (12)	Tracy McGrady (5)	TD Waterhouse Centre; 16,909	3–3
7	May 4	@ Detroit	L 93–108	Tracy McGrady (21)	Drew Gooden (17)	Tracy McGrady (6)	The Palace of Auburn Hills; 22,076	3–4

2003 schedule

== Player statistics ==
=== Regular season ===
Player	POS	GP	GS	MP	REB	AST	STL	BLK	PTS	MPG	RPG	APG	SPG	BPG	PPG
Darrell Armstrong	PG	82	23	2,350	295	323	135	13	769	28.7	3.6	3.9	1.6	.2	9.4
Pat Garrity	PF	81	53	2,584	306	121	62	20	868	31.9	3.8	1.5	.8	.2	10.7
Jacque Vaughn	PG	80	48	1,686	118	232	64	2	473	21.1	1.5	2.9	.8	.0	5.9
Shawn Kemp	C	79	55	1,633	451	55	66	33	537	20.7	5.7	.7	.8	.4	6.8
Andrew DeClercq	C	77	21	1,327	339	52	39	36	365	17.2	4.4	.7	.5	.5	4.7
Tracy McGrady	SG	75	74	2,954	488	411	124	59	2,407	39.4	6.5	5.5	1.7	.8	32.1
Jeryl Sasser	SG	75	4	1,025	184	65	45	12	194	13.7	2.5	.9	.6	.2	2.6
Pat Burke	C	62	8	783	146	23	19	25	267	12.6	2.4	.4	.3	.4	4.3
Mike Miller^{†}	SF	49	39	1,826	286	139	36	16	806	37.3	5.8	2.8	.7	.3	16.4
Ryan Humphrey^{†}	PF	35	1	322	69	7	4	16	64	9.2	2.0	.2	.1	.5	1.8
Steven Hunter	C	33	5	447	93	6	9	36	130	13.5	2.8	.2	.3	1.1	3.9
Grant Hill	SF	29	29	843	206	122	28	13	421	29.1	7.1	4.2	1.0	.4	14.5
Gordan Giriček^{†}	SF	27	27	961	130	67	30	2	387	35.6	4.8	2.5	1.1	.1	14.3
Olumide Oyedeji	C	27	3	145	50	5	5	3	27	5.4	1.9	.2	.2	.1	1.0
Chris Whitney^{†}	PG	22	1	290	21	21	12	1	78	13.2	1.0	1.0	.5	.0	3.5
Drew Gooden^{†}	PF	19	18	544	160	20	15	13	259	28.6	8.4	1.1	.8	.7	13.6
Horace Grant	PF	5	1	85	8	7	3	0	26	17.0	1.6	1.4	.6	.0	5.2

- ^{†} Denotes player spent time with another team in the season. Stats reflect time with the Magic only.

=== Playoffs ===
Player	POS	GP	GS	MP	REB	AST	STL	BLK	PTS	MPG	RPG	APG	SPG	BPG	PPG
Tracy McGrady	SG	7	7	308	47	33	14	6	222	44.0	6.7	4.7	2.0	.9	31.7
Drew Gooden	PF	7	7	234	89	4	3	6	98	33.4	12.7	.6	.4	.9	14.0
Gordan Giriček	SF	7	7	223	22	7	2	1	66	31.9	3.1	1.0	.3	.1	9.4
Jacque Vaughn	PG	7	6	131	6	25	4	1	34	18.7	.9	3.6	.6	.1	4.9
Andrew DeClercq	C	7	6	104	23	2	2	5	28	14.9	3.3	.3	.3	.7	4.0
Darrell Armstrong	PG	7	1	226	17	26	6	0	66	32.3	2.4	3.7	.9	.0	9.4
Pat Garrity	PF	7	1	163	18	5	2	3	28	23.3	2.6	.7	.3	.4	4.0
Chris Whitney	PG	7	0	111	11	7	2	2	22	15.9	1.6	1.0	.3	.3	3.1
Shawn Kemp	C	7	0	72	15	0	0	0	21	10.3	2.1	.0	.0	.0	3.0
Steven Hunter	C	7	0	40	3	1	0	3	6	5.7	.4	.1	.0	.4	.9
Pat Burke	C	6	0	43	11	1	1	0	17	7.2	1.8	.2	.2	.0	2.8
Jeryl Sasser	SG	6	0	25	5	1	1	1	5	4.2	.8	.2	.2	.2	.8

== Awards and honors ==
- Tracy McGrady – All-NBA 1st Team, Scoring Champion, All-Star
- Drew Gooden – All-Rookie 1st Team
- Gordan Giriček – All-Rookie 2nd Team

== Transactions ==
=== Overview ===
Players Added

Via draft

- Ryan Humphrey

Via trade

- Gordan Giricek
- Drew Gooden

Via free agency

- Shawn Kemp
- Olumide Oyedeji
- Jacque Vaughn
Players Lost

Via trade

- Ryan Humphrey
- Mike Miller
- Don Reid

Via free agency

- Troy Hudson
- Monty Williams

Player Transactions Citation:
