= Bobby Jackson =

American basketball player and coach (born 1973)

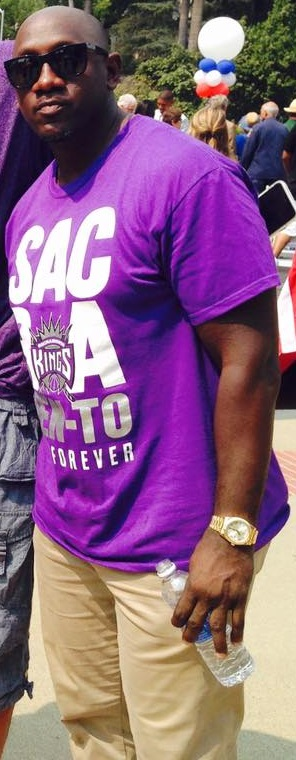
- Jackson in 2015

Sacramento Kings
- Title: Assistant coach
- League: NBA

Personal information
- Born: March 13, 1973 (age 53) East Spencer, North Carolina, U.S.
- Listed height: 6 ft 1 in (1.85 m)
- Listed weight: 185 lb (84 kg)

Career information
- High school: Salisbury (Salisbury, North Carolina)
- College: Western Nebraska CC (1993–1995); Minnesota (1995–1997)
- NBA draft: 1997: 1st round, 23rd overall pick
- Drafted by: Seattle SuperSonics
- Playing career: 1997–2009
- Position: Point guard / shooting guard
- Number: 13, 24, 8
- Coaching career: 2011–present

Career history

Playing
- 1997–1998: Denver Nuggets
- 1998–2000: Minnesota Timberwolves
- 2000–2005: Sacramento Kings
- 2005–2006: Memphis Grizzlies
- 2006–2008: New Orleans Hornets (Note: During the 2005–06 and 2006–07 seasons, the team was known as the New Orleans/Oklahoma City Hornets during their temporary relocation to Oklahoma City due to Hurricane Katrina.)
- 2008: Houston Rockets
- 2008–2009: Sacramento Kings

Coaching
- 2011–2013: Sacramento Kings (assistant)
- 2021–2023: Stockton Kings
- 2023–2025: Philadelphia 76ers (assistant)
- 2025–present: Sacramento Kings (assistant)

Career highlights
- NBA Sixth Man of the Year (2003); NBA All-Rookie Second Team (1998); Consensus second-team All-American (1997); Big Ten Player of the Year (1997)*; *Selection later vacated

Career NBA statistics
- Points: 7,344 (9.7 ppg)
- Rebounds: 2,347 (3.1 rpg)
- Assists: 1,945 (2.6 apg)
- Stats at NBA.com
- Stats at Basketball Reference

Bobby Jackson (born March 13, 1973) is an American professional basketball coach and former player, who is an assistant coach for the Sacramento Kings of the National Basketball Association (NBA). He played college basketball for Western Nebraska Community College and the University of Minnesota. In the NBA, he played for several teams over twelve seasons, from 1997 to 2009.

== Playing career ==
=== Collegiate ===
Jackson graduated from Salisbury High School in 1992. He attended Western Nebraska Community College and later the University of Minnesota. As a Golden Gopher, Bobby Jackson led Minnesota to the Final Four, where they lost to the Kentucky Wildcats. Jackson was a consensus All American and won Big Ten player of the year in 1997, until the award was vacated due to his participation in the University of Minnesota basketball scandal.

=== Professional ===
Jackson was selected by the Seattle SuperSonics with the 23rd pick in the 1997 NBA draft. He was traded to the Denver Nuggets prior to his rookie season where he played 68 games before moving on to a more familiar place in Minnesota where he donned a Timberwolves jersey for two seasons.

He is perhaps best known for his years in Sacramento when he played for the Kings from 2000 to 2005, where he was known as "Action Jackson" and was a crowd favorite. In the 2002 NBA Playoffs, after he and his team finished with a 61–21 regular season record, Jackson and the Kings came within one game of making the NBA Finals, eliminated controversially by the Los Angeles Lakers. During the 2002-03 NBA season, Jackson averaged a career-best 15.2 points per game on the way to being named the Sixth Man of the Year. Jackson suffered an abdominal strain early in the 2004–05 season that forced him to miss 51 games. The following season, he was traded to the Memphis Grizzlies for Bonzi Wells.

On July 29, 2008, it was reported that Jackson would be traded by the Rockets back to the Sacramento Kings along with Donté Greene, a 2009 first round draft pick and cash consideration in exchange for Ron Artest (now Metta World Peace). The trade was completed on August 14, due to Greene's rookie contract signing on July 14.

Jackson retired from the NBA on October 24, 2009.

== Coaching career ==
=== Sacramento Kings ===
Jackson became an assistant coach for the Sacramento Kings. On June 5, 2013, new Kings coach Michael Malone announced that the 2012–13 assistant coaches would not be retained for the 2013–14 season.

=== Minnesota Timberwolves ===
On September 9, 2013, Jackson was hired by the Minnesota Timberwolves as a player development coach.

=== Stockton Kings ===
In 2021, Jackson was named the head coach of the Stockton Kings in the NBA G League.

=== Philadelphia 76ers ===
On September 5, 2023, Jackson became an assistant coach for the Philadelphia 76ers.

=== Sacramento Kings (second stint) ===
On May 7, 2025, the Sacramento Kings hired Jackson as an assistant coach. On July 7, 2026, it was announced that Jackson would not return to the Kings for the 2026–27 season.

== NBA career statistics ==
Legend
GP	Games played	GS	Games started	MPG	Minutes per game
FG%	Field goal percentage	3P%	3-point field goal percentage	FT%	Free throw percentage
RPG	Rebounds per game	APG	Assists per game	SPG	Steals per game
BPG	Blocks per game	PPG	Points per game	**Bold**	Career high
*	Led the league

=== Regular season ===
Year	Team	GP	GS	MPG	FG%	3P%	FT%	RPG	APG	SPG	BPG	PPG
1997–98	Denver	68	**53**	**30.0**	.392	.259	.814	**4.4**	**4.7**	**1.5**	**.2**	11.6
1998–99	Minnesota	50*	12	18.8	.405	.370	.772	2.7	3.3	.8	.1	7.1
1999–00	Minnesota	73	10	14.2	.405	.283	.776	2.1	2.4	.7	.1	5.1
2000–01	Sacramento	79	7	20.9	.439	.375	.739	3.1	2.0	1.1	.1	7.2
2001–02	Sacramento	**81**	3	21.6	.443	.361	.810	3.1	2.0	.9	.1	11.1
2002–03	Sacramento	59	26	28.4	**.464**	.379	.846	3.7	3.1	1.2	.1	**15.2**
2003–04	Sacramento	50	0	23.7	.444	.370	.752	3.5	2.1	1.0	**.2**	13.8
2004–05	Sacramento	25	0	21.4	.427	.344	**.862**	3.4	2.4	.6	.1	12.0
2005–06	Memphis	71	15	25.0	.382	**.389**	.733	3.1	2.7	.9	.0	11.4
2006–07	NO/Oklahoma City	56	2	23.8	.394	.327	.774	3.2	2.5	.9	.1	10.6
2007–08	New Orleans	46	0	19.4	.392	.368	.816	2.4	1.7	.7	.1	7.1
2007–08	Houston	26	5	19.2	.419	.341	.750	2.7	2.4	.5	.1	8.8
2008–09	Sacramento	71	10	20.9	.398	.305	.851	2.8	2.0	.9	.1	7.5
Career		755	143	22.2	.417	.354	.793	3.1	2.6	.9	.0	9.7

=== Playoffs ===
Year	Team	GP	GS	MPG	FG%	3P%	FT%	RPG	APG	SPG	BPG	PPG
1999	Minnesota	4	0	6.8	.200	.000	.000	1.0	.5	.0	.0	1.0
2000	Minnesota	3	0	10.0	**.500**	.333	**1.000**	1.7	1.3	.7	**.3**	5.0
2001	Sacramento	8	0	22.8	.438	.286	.714	3.3	2.3	**1.0**	.0	7.0
2002	Sacramento	**16**	1	23.4	.445	.256	.791	3.3	2.0	.9	.2	10.9
2003	Sacramento	12	0	**27.6**	.457	.349	.886	**4.5**	**3.3**	**1.0**	.1	**14.3**
2005	Sacramento	5	0	15.8	.270	.167	**1.000**	1.2	1.8	.2	.2	5.2
2006	Memphis	4	0	25.0	.414	**.364**	.714	2.0	1.3	.3	.0	8.3
2008	Houston	6	**2**	23.0	.286	.208	.636	1.7	1.5	.8	.0	8.7
Career		58	3	21.7	.405	.270	.807	2.8	2.1	.7	.1	9.2
