= 2002–03 Philadelphia 76ers season =

NBA professional basketball team season

- Head coach: Larry Brown
- General manager: Billy King
- Owners: Comcast Spectacor
- Arena: First Union Center

Results
- Record: 48–34 (.585)
- Place: Division: 2nd (Atlantic); Conference: 4th (Eastern)
- Playoff finish: Conference semifinals (lost to Pistons 2–4)
- Stats at Basketball Reference

Local media
- Television: WPSG; Comcast SportsNet Philadelphia
- Radio: WIP

The 2002–03 Philadelphia 76ers season was the 54th season for the Philadelphia 76ers in the National Basketball Association, and their 40th season in Philadelphia, Pennsylvania.

== Season summary ==
=== Off-season ===
During the off-season, the 76ers acquired Keith Van Horn, and former 76ers center Todd MacCulloch from the New Jersey Nets; Van Horn was originally drafted by the team as the second overall pick in the 1997 NBA draft. The team also signed free agents Greg Buckner and Brian Skinner.

=== Regular season ===
With the addition of Van Horn and MacCulloch, the 76ers got off to a fast start by winning 15 of their first 19 games of the regular season, which included an eight-game winning streak November and December. In December, the team acquired Kenny Thomas from the Houston Rockets in a three-team trade. However, the 76ers struggled losing 14 of their next 18 games, which included a six-game losing streak in January, as the team held a 25–24 record at the All-Star break. The 76ers posted a nine-game winning streak between February and March, and finished in second place in the Atlantic Division with a 48–34 record, earning the fourth seed in the Eastern Conference; the team qualified for the NBA playoffs for the fifth consecutive year.

For the first time in his NBA career, Allen Iverson played a full 82-game season, averaging 27.6 points, 5.5 assists and 2.7 steals per game, as he was named to the All-NBA Second Team. In addition, Van Horn averaged 15.9 points and 7.1 rebounds per game, while Eric Snow provided the team with 12.9 points, 6.6 assists and 1.6 steals per game, and was named to the NBA All-Defensive Second Team, and Thomas contributed 10.2 points and 8.5 rebounds per game in 46 games after the trade. Meanwhile, Derrick Coleman provided with 9.4 points and 7.0 rebounds per game, Aaron McKie contributed 9.0 points, 3.5 assists and 1.6 steals per game, MacCulloch averaged 7.1 points and 4.7 rebounds per game, but only played just 42 games, Buckner contributed 6.0 points per game, and Skinner provided with 6.0 points and 4.8 rebounds per game.

During the NBA All-Star weekend at the Philips Arena in Atlanta, Georgia, Iverson was selected for the 2003 NBA All-Star Game, as a member of the Eastern Conference All-Star team. Iverson finished in sixth place in Most Valuable Player voting, and also finished in sixth place in Defensive Player of the Year voting, while Snow finished in tenth place; Snow also finished tied in 21st place in Most Improved Player voting, and head coach Larry Brown finished in ninth place in Coach of the Year voting.

The 76ers finished fourth in the NBA in home-game attendance, with an attendance of 807,097 at the First Union Center during the regular season.

=== NBA playoffs ===
In the Eastern Conference First Round of the 2003 NBA playoffs, the 76ers faced off against the 5th–seeded New Orleans Hornets, who were led by the trio of All-Star forward Jamal Mashburn, All-Star guard Baron Davis, and David Wesley. The 76ers took a 3–1 series lead over the Hornets, before losing Game 5 at home, 93–91 at the First Union Center. The 76ers won Game 6 over the Hornets on the road, 107–103 at the New Orleans Arena to win the series in six games.

In the Eastern Conference Semi-finals, the team faced off against the top–seeded, and Central Division champion Detroit Pistons, who were led by the trio of Richard Hamilton, Chauncey Billups, and All-Star center, and Defensive Player of the Year, Ben Wallace. The 76ers lost the first two games to the Pistons on the road at The Palace of Auburn Hills, but managed to win the next two games at home, which included a Game 4 win over the Pistons at the First Union Center, 95–82. However, the 76ers lost the next two games, including a Game 6 loss to the Pistons at the First Union Center in overtime, 93–89, thus losing the series in six games.

=== Aftermath ===
Following the season, Van Horn was traded to the New York Knicks in a four-team trade, and Brown resigned as head coach after six seasons with the 76ers, and would take a coaching job with the Detroit Pistons. The 76ers would not win another NBA playoff series until the 2011–12 season.

== Offseason ==
In the 2002 NBA draft, the 76ers drafted Czech swingman Jiří Welsch and forward-center Sam Clancy (Clancy would not play in any games in the NBA). The Sixers also made three trades on draft day. Their first trade was with the Golden State Warriors. They traded their first round pick, Jiří Welsch, for a 2004 2nd round draft pick and a 2005 1st round draft pick. In their second trade, they traded Speedy Claxton to the San Antonio Spurs for Mark Bryant, Randy Holcomb, and John Salmons. Their third and final trade of the night was with the Atlanta Hawks. They traded a 2004 2nd round draft pick and a 2006 2nd round draft pick to the Hawks for Efthimios Rentzias.

On July 25, the 76ers signed Greg Buckner and Monty Williams.

On August 6, the Sixers traded Dikembe Mutombo to the New Jersey Nets for Todd MacCulloch and Keith Van Horn. This trade marked the beginning of MacCulloch's second tenure with the franchise.

On August 27, the Sixers signed Brian Skinner.

On September 30, the Sixers signed Art Long and William Avery. Avery would not play any games with Philadelphia.

On October 11, the Sixers waived Alvin Jones. On the 23rd, they waived Damone Brown.

=== Draft picks ===
Round	Pick	Player	Position	Nationality	College
1	16	Jiří Welsch	SG/SF	Czech Republic	Union Olimpija (Slovenia and Adriatic League)
2	45	Sam Clancy	PF/C	United States	USC

== Roster ==
2002–03 Philadelphia 76ers roster
Players

Pos.	No.	Player	Height	Weight	DOB	From
SG	21	Greg Buckner	6 ft 4 in (1.93 m)	210 lb (95 kg)	1976–09–16	Clemson
PF	50	Sam Clancy Jr.	6 ft 7 in (2.01 m)	240 lb (109 kg)	1980–05–04	USC
C	44	Derrick Coleman	6 ft 10 in (2.08 m)	230 lb (104 kg)	1967–06–21	Syracuse
C	1	Samuel Dalembert	6 ft 11 in (2.11 m)	250 lb (113 kg)	1981–05–10	Seton Hall
PF	40	Tyrone Hill	6 ft 9 in (2.06 m)	240 lb (109 kg)	1968–03–19	Xavier
SG	3	Allen Iverson	6 ft 0 in (1.83 m)	163 lb (74 kg)	1975–06–07	Georgetown
C	11	Todd MacCulloch	7 ft 0 in (2.13 m)	280 lb (127 kg)	1976–01–27	Washington
SF	8	Aaron McKie	6 ft 5 in (1.96 m)	209 lb (95 kg)	1972–10–02	Temple
C	14	Efthimios Rentzias	6 ft 11 in (2.11 m)	250 lb (113 kg)	1976–01–11	Greece
PG	7	John Salmons	6 ft 6 in (1.98 m)	207 lb (94 kg)	1979–12–12	Miami (FL)
PF	54	Brian Skinner	6 ft 9 in (2.06 m)	255 lb (116 kg)	1976–05–19	Baylor
PG	20	Eric Snow	6 ft 3 in (1.91 m)	190 lb (86 kg)	1973–04–24	Michigan State
PF	9	Kenny Thomas	6 ft 7 in (2.01 m)	245 lb (111 kg)	1977–07–25	New Mexico
PF	4	Keith Van Horn	6 ft 10 in (2.08 m)	220 lb (100 kg)	1975–10–23	Utah
SF	5	Monty Williams	6 ft 8 in (2.03 m)	225 lb (102 kg)	1971–10–08	Notre Dame

Coaches
Head coach
- Larry Brown
Assistant(s)
- Randy Ayers
- Bob Bender
- Dave Hanners
- John Kuester
- Mike Woodson

Legend
- (DP) Unsigned draft pick
- (FA) Free agent
- (S) Suspended
- (IN) Inactive
- Injured

Roster
Updated: March 3, 2003

=== Roster Notes ===
- Center Samuel Dalembert was on the injured reserve list due to a knee injury, and missed the entire regular season.

== Regular season ==
=== Season standings ===
Atlantic Division	W	L	PCT	GB	Home	Road	Div
y-New Jersey Nets	49	33	.598	–	33–8	16–25	16–8
x-Philadelphia 76ers	48	34	.585	1	25–16	23–18	17–7
x-Boston Celtics	44	38	.537	5	25–16	19–22	13–12
x-Orlando Magic	42	40	.512	7	26–15	16–25	14–11
e-Washington Wizards	37	45	.451	12	23–18	14–27	11–13
e-New York Knicks	37	45	.451	12	24–17	13–28	9–15
e-Miami Heat	25	57	.305	24	16–25	9–32	5–19

#	Eastern Conference				
#	Team	W	L	PCT	GB
1	c-Detroit Pistons	50	32	.610	–
2	y-New Jersey Nets	49	33	.598	1
3	x-Indiana Pacers	48	34	.585	2
4	x-Philadelphia 76ers	48	34	.585	2
5	x-New Orleans Hornets	47	35	.573	3
6	x-Boston Celtics	44	38	.537	6
7	x-Milwaukee Bucks	42	40	.512	8
8	x-Orlando Magic	42	40	.512	8
9	e-New York Knicks	37	45	.451	13
10	e-Washington Wizards	37	45	.451	13
11	e-Atlanta Hawks	35	47	.427	15
12	e-Chicago Bulls	30	52	.366	20
13	e-Miami Heat	25	57	.305	25
14	e-Toronto Raptors	24	58	.293	26
15	e-Cleveland Cavaliers	17	65	.207	33

z – clinched division title
y – clinched division title
x – clinched playoff spot

== Playoffs ==
2003 playoff game log
First Round: 4–2 (home: 2–1; road: 2–1)

Game	Date	Team	Score	High points	High rebounds	High assists	Location Attendance	Series
1	April 20	New Orleans	W 98–90	Allen Iverson (55)	Keith Van Horn (10)	Eric Snow (10)	First Union Center; 19,711	1–0
2	April 23	New Orleans	W 90–85	Allen Iverson (29)	Kenny Thomas (16)	Derrick Coleman (6)	First Union Center; 20,229	2–0
3	April 26	@ New Orleans	L 85–99	Allen Iverson (28)	Keith Van Horn (9)	Allen Iverson (7)	New Orleans Arena; 17,320	2–1
4	April 28	@ New Orleans	W 96–87	Allen Iverson (22)	Kenny Thomas (8)	Eric Snow (12)	New Orleans Arena; 16,243	3–1
5	April 30	New Orleans	L 91–93	Allen Iverson (30)	Kenny Thomas (14)	Iverson, Snow (7)	First Union Center; 19,403	3–2
6	May 2	@ New Orleans	W 107–103	Allen Iverson (45)	Keith Van Horn (18)	Eric Snow (9)	New Orleans Arena; 18,570	4–2

Conference Semifinals: 2–4 (home: 2–1; road: 0–3)

Game	Date	Team	Score	High points	High rebounds	High assists	Location Attendance	Series
1	May 6	@ Detroit	L 87–98	Allen Iverson (27)	Derrick Coleman (8)	Allen Iverson (8)	The Palace of Auburn Hills; 22,076	0–1
2	May 8	@ Detroit	L 97–104 (OT)	Allen Iverson (31)	Kenny Thomas (19)	Allen Iverson (7)	The Palace of Auburn Hills; 22,076	0–2
3	May 10	Detroit	W 93–83	Allen Iverson (25)	Kenny Thomas (14)	Allen Iverson (11)	First Union Center; 20,743	1–2
4	May 11	Detroit	W 95–82	Allen Iverson (36)	Derrick Coleman (15)	Allen Iverson (11)	First Union Center; 20,549	2–2
5	May 14	@ Detroit	L 77–78	Derrick Coleman (23)	Derrick Coleman (11)	Allen Iverson (9)	The Palace of Auburn Hills; 22,076	2–3
6	May 16	Detroit	L 89–93 (OT)	Allen Iverson (38)	Kenny Thomas (14)	Allen Iverson (9)	First Union Center; 20,888	2–4

2003 schedule

== Player statistics ==
Legend
GP	Games played	GS	Games started	MPG	Minutes per game
FG%	Field-goal percentage	3P%	3-point field-goal percentage	FT%	Free-throw percentage
RPG	Rebounds per game	APG	Assists per game	SPG	Steals per game
BPG	Blocks per game	PPG	Points per game

=== Regular season ===
Player	GP	GS	MPG	FG%	3P%	FT%	RPG	APG	SPG	BPG	PPG
Mark Bryant^{†}	11	0	7.0	.294		1.000	1.5	.1	.1	.1	1.1
Greg Buckner	75	5	20.2	.465	.273	.802	2.9	1.3	1.0	.2	6.0
Derrick Coleman	64	35	27.2	.448	.328	.784	7.0	1.4	.8	1.1	9.4
Tyrone Hill^{†}	24	18	20.7	.404		.600	5.2	.4	.6	.3	4.5
Allen Iverson	82	82	42.5	.414	.277	.774	4.2	5.5	2.7	.2	27.6
Art Long^{†}	19	0	6.9	.380	1.000	.200	2.1	.1	.1	.4	2.1
Todd MacCulloch	42	35	19.3	.517		.671	4.7	.5	.5	.8	7.1
Aaron McKie	80	40	29.7	.429	.330	.836	4.4	3.5	1.6	.1	9.0
Efthimios Rentzias	35	0	4.1	.339	.500	.889	.7	.2	.2	.1	1.5
John Salmons	64	1	7.9	.414	.323	.743	.9	.7	.3	.1	2.1
Kenny Satterfield^{†}	17	0	4.8	.222		.500	.5	.9	.1	.0	.5
Brian Skinner	77	9	17.9	.550		.602	4.8	.2	.6	.7	6.0
Eric Snow	82	82	37.9	.452	.219	.858	3.7	6.6	1.6	.1	12.9
Kenny Thomas^{†}	46	28	30.3	.482		.750	8.5	1.6	1.0	.5	10.2
Keith Van Horn	74	73	31.6	.482	.369	.804	7.1	1.3	.9	.4	15.9
Monty Williams	21	2	13.1	.425	.000	.750	2.1	1.2	.6	.2	4.4

=== Playoffs ===
Player	GP	GS	MPG	FG%	3P%	FT%	RPG	APG	SPG	BPG	PPG
Greg Buckner	10	0	11.2	.323	.222	1.000	1.7	.3	.1	.2	2.6
Derrick Coleman	12	12	37.4	.500	.400	.872	8.0	2.0	.6	1.3	13.6
Tyrone Hill	10	0	14.1	.632		1.000	2.8	.2	.1	.1	2.8
Allen Iverson	12	12	46.4	.416	.345	.737	4.3	7.4	2.4	.1	31.7
Aaron McKie	12	0	26.3	.535	.556	.857	3.6	1.8	.8	.2	7.8
John Salmons	6	0	2.7	.000	.000	.000	.5	.0	.0	.0	.0
Brian Skinner	8	0	4.8	.167	.000	1.000	.8	.0	.0	.1	.8
Eric Snow	12	12	34.6	.422	.100	.879	3.3	5.6	1.5	.0	11.5
Kenny Thomas	12	12	32.4	.535		.655	9.3	.9	.7	.4	10.6
Keith Van Horn	12	12	33.5	.382	.438	.900	7.5	.8	.8	.2	10.4
Monty Williams	10	0	9.6	.348	.000	.750	1.5	.0	.2	.0	1.9

- ^{†} Denotes player spent time with another team in the season. Stats reflect time with the 76ers only.

Player statistics citation:

== Awards and records ==
- Allen Iverson, All-NBA Second Team
- Eric Snow, NBA All-Defensive Second Team

== See also ==
- 2002–03 NBA season
