= 2011–12 New York Knicks season =

Season of National Basketball Association team the New York Knicks

- Head coach: Mike D'Antoni (through March 14, 2012); Mike Woodson (after March 14, 2012)
- General manager: Glen Grunwald
- Owners: Madison Square Garden, Inc.
- Arena: Madison Square Garden

Results
- Record: 36–30 (.545)
- Place: Division: 2nd (Atlantic); Conference: 7th (Eastern)
- Playoff finish: First round (lost to Heat 1–4)
- Stats at Basketball Reference

Local media
- Television: MSG Network, MSG Plus, WWOR
- Radio: WEPN

The 2011–12 New York Knicks season was the 66th season of the franchise in the National Basketball Association (NBA). The Knicks finished the regular season with a 36–30 record and a seventh place in the Eastern Conference to reach the 2012 NBA Playoffs where they lost in the first round against the eventual NBA champion Miami Heat in five games. Notable events of the season included coach Mike D'Antoni's resignation, the surge in popularity of 23-year-old point guard Jeremy Lin during a seven-game winning streak ("Linsanity"), and the Knicks winning their first playoff game since 2001 against the Miami Heat, snapping an NBA-record 13-game playoff losing streak.

== Key dates ==
- June 23: The 2011 NBA draft took place at Prudential Center in Newark, New Jersey.
- July 1: The CBA expires and the 2011 NBA Lockout begins.
- December 8: The player and the owners ratified a new 10-year CBA ending the 161-day lockout.
- December 9: Free Agency and Training camps begin.
- December 25: The regular season begins with a match against the Boston Celtics in the Madison Square Garden.
- April 19: The Knicks clinched a spot in the 2012 NBA Playoffs.
- May 9: The Knicks' season ends with a game 5 loss to the Miami Heat.

== Draft picks ==
Round	Pick	Player	Position	Nationality	College
1	17	Iman Shumpert	Guard	United States	Georgia Tech

== Roster ==
2011–12 New York Knicks roster
Players

Pos.	No.	Player	Height	Weight	DOB	From
F	7	Carmelo Anthony	6 ft 8 in (2.03 m)	230 lb (104 kg)	1984–05–29	Syracuse
G	20	Mike Bibby	6 ft 2 in (1.88 m)	195 lb (88 kg)	1978–05–13	Arizona
C	6	Tyson Chandler	7 ft 1 in (2.16 m)	240 lb (109 kg)	1982–10–02	Dominguez HS (CA)
G	85	Baron Davis	6 ft 3 in (1.91 m)	212 lb (96 kg)	1979–04–13	UCLA
G	23	Toney Douglas	6 ft 2 in (1.88 m)	185 lb (84 kg)	1986–06–16	Florida State
G	2	Landry Fields	6 ft 7 in (2.01 m)	215 lb (98 kg)	1988–06–27	Stanford
C	50	Dan Gadzuric	6 ft 11 in (2.11 m)	245 lb (111 kg)	1978–02–22	UCLA
C	55	Josh Harrellson	6 ft 10 in (2.08 m)	275 lb (125 kg)	1989–02–12	Kentucky
F	9	Jared Jeffries	6 ft 11 in (2.11 m)	240 lb (109 kg)	1981–11–25	Indiana
C	44	Jerome Jordan	7 ft 0 in (2.13 m)	240 lb (109 kg)	1986–09–29	Tulsa
G	17	Jeremy Lin	6 ft 3 in (1.91 m)	200 lb (91 kg)	1988–08–23	Harvard
F	16	Steve Novak	6 ft 10 in (2.08 m)	240 lb (109 kg)	1983–06–13	Marquette
G	21	Iman Shumpert	6 ft 5 in (1.96 m)	220 lb (100 kg)	1990–06–26	Georgia Tech
G	8	J. R. Smith	6 ft 6 in (1.98 m)	220 lb (100 kg)	1985–09–09	St. Benedict's Prep (NJ)
F/C	1	Amar'e Stoudemire	6 ft 11 in (2.11 m)	260 lb (118 kg)	1982–11–16	Cypress Creek HS (FL)

Coaches
Head coach
- Mike Woodson
Assistant(s)
- Herb Williams
- Kenny Atkinson
- Darrell Walker
- Jim Todd

Legend
- (DP) Unsigned draft pick
- (FA) Free agent
- (S) Suspended
- Injured

== Pre-season ==
Due to the 2011 NBA lockout negotiations, the programmed pre-season schedule, along with the first two weeks of the regular season were scrapped, and a two-game pre-season was set for each team once the lockout concluded.

=== Game log ===
2011 pre-season game log
Pre-season: 2–0 (home: 1–0; road: 1–0)

Game	Date	Team	Score	High points	High rebounds	High assists	Location Attendance	Record
1	December 17	@ New Jersey	W 92–83	Renaldo Balkman (20)	Landry Fields (7)	Toney Douglas (5)	Prudential Center; 13,027	1–0
2	December 21	New Jersey	W 88–82	Carmelo Anthony (21)	Tyson Chandler (12)	Carmelo Anthony; Toney Douglas; Landry Fields; Iman Shumpert (3)	Madison Square Garden; 19,763	2–0

2011–12 season schedule

== Regular season ==
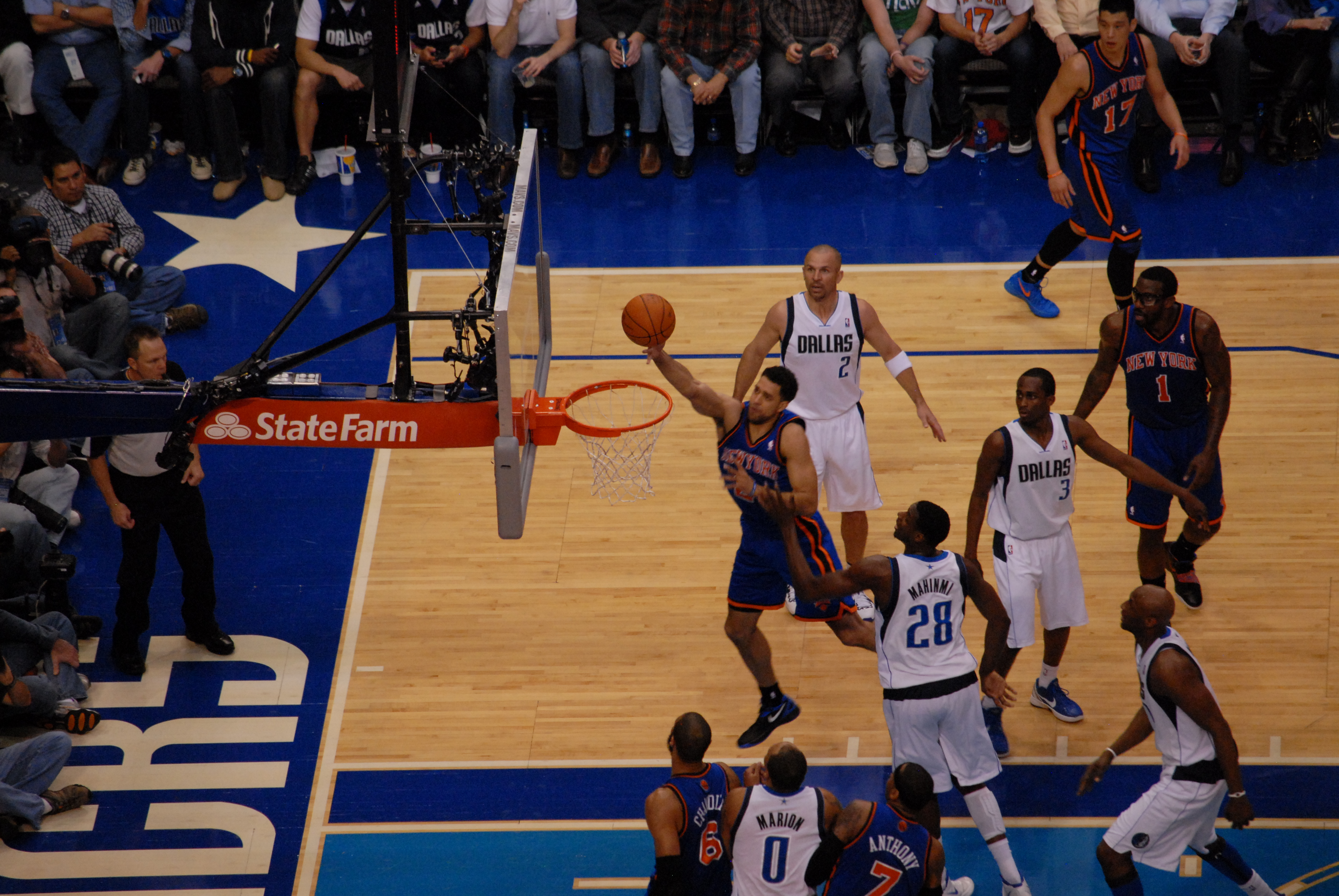
The Knicks playing against the Dallas Mavericks during the season

After a lack-luster start to the season where the Knicks had 8 wins and 13 losses in their first 21 games, Jeremy Lin burst on the scene. Injuries forced coach Mike D'Antoni to name Lin as the starting point guard, and Lin responded with averages of 27.3 points, 8.3 assists and 2.0 steals in his first four starts. Lin closed the February 14th game against Toronto with a game-winning three-pointer that left 0.5 seconds on the clock.

However, when Carmelo Anthony returned from injury in late February, the Knicks hot streak ended. After a 6-game losing streak to start the month of March, Mike D'Antoni resigned as coach, and was replaced by his assistant Mike Woodson. The Knicks ended the season strong 18-6 under Woodson.

However, the magic was gone as Lin suffered a knee injury against the Detroit Pistons. He underwent surgery days after and was placed on injured reserve, ending his season.

=== Game log ===
2011–12 game log
Total: 36–30 (home: 22–11; road: 14–19)
December: 2–2 (home: 1–0; road: 1–2)

Game	Date	Team	Score	High points	High rebounds	High assists	Location Attendance	Record
1	December 25	Boston	W 106–104	Carmelo Anthony (37)	Carmelo Anthony (8)	Toney Douglas (4)	Madison Square Garden; 19,763	1–0
2	December 28	@ Golden State	L 78–92	Amar'e Stoudemire (16)	Amar'e Stoudemire (10)	Mike Bibby (4)	Oracle Arena; 19,596	1–1
3	December 29	@ L. A. Lakers	L 82–99	Carmelo Anthony (27)	Tyson Chandler (11)	Carmelo Anthony (5)	Staples Center; 18,997	1–2
4	December 31	@ Sacramento	W 114–92	Carmelo Anthony (23)	Josh Harrellson (12)	Toney Douglas (8)	Power Balance Pavilion; 16,175	2–2

January : 6–11 (home: 3–6; road: 3–5)

Game	Date	Team	Score	High points	High rebounds	High assists	Location Attendance	Record
5	January 2	Toronto	L 85–90	Carmelo Anthony (35)	Carmelo Anthony (11)	Landry Fields (5)	Madison Square Garden; 19,763	2–3
6	January 4	Charlotte	L 110–118	Carmelo Anthony (32)	Amar'e Stoudemire (12)	Carmelo Anthony, Toney Douglas (5)	Madison Square Garden; 19,763	2–4
7	January 6	@ Washington	W 99–96	Carmelo Anthony (37)	Tyson Chandler (15)	Iman Shumpert (7)	Verizon Center; 16,998	3–4
8	January 7	@ Detroit	W 103–80	Amar'e Stoudemire (22)	Tyson Chandler (9)	Carmelo Anthony (7)	The Palace of Auburn Hills; 12,044	4–4
9	January 9	Charlotte	W 91–87	Amar'e Stoudemire (25)	Tyson Chandler (13)	Carmelo Anthony (6)	Madison Square Garden; 19,763	5–4
10	January 11	Philadelphia	W 85–79	Carmelo Anthony (27)	Tyson Chandler (13)	Carmelo Anthony (5)	Madison Square Garden; 19,763	6–4
11	January 12	@ Memphis	L 83–94	Carmelo Anthony, Bill Walker (14)	Tyson Chandler (11)	Toney Douglas (4)	FedExForum; 15,324	6–5
12	January 14	@ Oklahoma City	L 92–104	Amar'e Stoudemire (14)	Bill Walker (7)	Bill Walker (3)	Chesapeake Energy Arena; 18,203	6–6
13	January 16	Orlando	L 93–102	Carmelo Anthony (33)	Carmelo Anthony, Tyson Chandler (8)	Carmelo Anthony (5)	Madison Square Garden; 19,763	6–7
14	January 18	Phoenix	L 88–91	Amar'e Stoudemire (23)	Tyson Chandler (17)	Carmelo Anthony, Tyson Chandler, Landry Fields (4)	Madison Square Garden; 19,763	6–8
15	January 20	Milwaukee	L 86–100	Carmelo Anthony (35)	Tyson Chandler (12)	Iman Shumpert (5)	Madison Square Garden; 19,763	6–9
16	January 21	Denver	L 114–119	Carmelo Anthony (25)	Amar'e Stoudemire (11)	Landry Fields, Iman Shumpert (7)	Madison Square Garden; 19,763	6–10
17	January 24	@ Charlotte	W 111–78	Tyson Chandler (20)	Tyson Chandler (17)	Landry Fields (5)	Time Warner Cable Arena; 16,802	7–10
18	January 25	@ Cleveland	L 81–91	Amar'e Stoudemire (19)	Amar'e Stoudemire (14)	Carmelo Anthony (6)	Quicken Loans Arena; 16,760	7–11
19	January 27	@ Miami	L 89–99	Bill Walker (21)	Tyson Chandler (12)	Landry Fields, Toney Douglas (5)	American Airlines Arena; 19,707	7–12
20	January 28	@ Houston	L 84–97	Amar'e Stoudemire (23)	Tyson Chandler (11)	Jeremy Lin (6)	Toyota Center; 18,051	7–13
21	January 31	Detroit	W 113–86	Carmelo Anthony (25)	Tyson Chandler (8)	Carmelo Anthony, Iman Shumpert (6)	Madison Square Garden; 19,763	8–13

February: 10–5 (home: 7–3; road: 3–2)

Game	Date	Team	Score	High points	High rebounds	High assists	Location Attendance	Record
22	February 2	Chicago	L 102–105	Amar'e Stoudemire (34)	Amar'e Stoudemire (11)	Iman Shumpert (8)	Madison Square Garden; 19,763	8–14
23	February 3	@ Boston	L 89–91	Carmelo Anthony (26)	Amar'e Stoudemire, Tyson Chandler (11)	Carmelo Anthony (6)	TD Garden; 18,624	8–15
24	February 4	New Jersey	W 99–92	Jeremy Lin (25)	Jared Jeffries (10)	Jeremy Lin (7)	Madison Square Garden; 19,763	9–15
25	February 6	Utah	W 99–88	Jeremy Lin (28)	Jared Jeffries (8)	Jeremy Lin (8)	Madison Square Garden; 19,763	10–15
26	February 8	@ Washington	W 107–93	Tyson Chandler (25)	Tyson Chandler (11)	Jeremy Lin (10)	Verizon Center; 17,376	11–15
27	February 10	L. A. Lakers	W 92–85	Jeremy Lin (38)	Tyson Chandler (11)	Jeremy Lin (7)	Madison Square Garden; 19,763	12–15
28	February 11	@ Minnesota	W 100–98	Jeremy Lin; Iman Shumpert (20)	Jared Jeffries (8)	Jeremy Lin (8)	Target Center; 20,232	13–15
29	February 14	@ Toronto	W 90–87	Jeremy Lin (27)	Amar'e Stoudemire, Tyson Chandler (9)	Jeremy Lin (11)	Air Canada Centre; 20,092	14–15
30	February 15	Sacramento	W 100–85	Landry Fields (15)	Landry Fields (10)	Jeremy Lin (13)	Madison Square Garden; 19,763	15–15
31	February 17	New Orleans	L 85–89	Amar'e Stoudemire, Jeremy Lin (26)	Amar'e Stoudemire (12)	Jeremy Lin (5)	Madison Square Garden; 19,763	15–16
32	February 19	Dallas	W 104–97	Jeremy Lin (28)	Tyson Chandler (10)	Jeremy Lin (14)	Madison Square Garden; 19,763	16–16
33	February 20	New Jersey	L 92–100	Jeremy Lin (21)	Landry Fields (11)	Jeremy Lin (9)	Madison Square Garden; 19,763	16–17
34	February 22	Atlanta	W 99–82	Jeremy Lin, Steve Novak (17)	Amar'e Stoudemire (10)	Jeremy Lin (9)	Madison Square Garden; 19,763	17–17
35	February 23	@ Miami	L 88–102	Carmelo Anthony (19)	Tyson Chandler (9)	Jeremy Lin, J.R. Smith, Baron Davis (3)	American Airlines Arena; 20,197	17–18
36	February 29	Cleveland	W 120–103	Carmelo Anthony (22)	Tyson Chandler (15)	Jeremy Lin (7)	Madison Square Garden; 19,763	18–18

March: 9–8 (home: 7–1; road: 2–7)

Game	Date	Team	Score	High points	High rebounds	High assists	Location Attendance	Record
37	March 4	@ Boston	L 111–115	Carmelo Anthony (25)	Tyson Chandler (14)	Baron Davis (7)	TD Garden; 18,624	18–19
38	March 6	@ Dallas	L 85–95	Amar'e Stoudemire (26)	Landry Fields (10)	Jeremy Lin (7)	American Airlines Center; 20,605	18–20
39	March 7	@ San Antonio	L 105–118	Carmelo Anthony (27)	Amar'e Stoudemire (11)	Baron Davis (8)	AT&T Center; 18,581	18–21
40	March 9	@ Milwaukee	L 114–119	Amar'e Stoudemire (27)	Amar'e Stoudemire (11)	Jeremy Lin (13)	Bradley Center; 18,717	18–22
41	March 11	Philadelphia	L 94–106	Carmelo Anthony (22)	Tyson Chandler (12)	Jeremy Lin (7)	Madison Square Garden; 19,763	18–23
42	March 12	@ Chicago	L 99–104	Carmelo Anthony (21)	Tyson Chandler (10)	Jeremy Lin (8)	United Center; 22,863	18–24
43	March 14	Portland	W 121–79	J.R. Smith (25)	Amar'e Stoudemire (8)	Baron Davis (10)	Madison Square Garden; 19,763	19–24
44	March 16	Indiana	W 115–100	Tyson Chandler, J.R. Smith (16)	Carmelo Anthony, Tyson Chandler, Landry Fields (7)	Carmelo Anthony, Jeremy Lin (5)	Madison Square Garden; 19,763	20–24
45	March 17	@ Indiana	W 102–88	Jeremy Lin (19)	Tyson Chandler (9)	Jeremy Lin (7)	Bankers Life Fieldhouse; 18,165	21–24
46	March 20	Toronto	W 106–87	Amar'e Stoudemire (22)	Amar'e Stoudemire (12)	Jeremy Lin (10)	Madison Square Garden; 19,763	22–24
47	March 21	@ Philadelphia	W 82–79	Amar'e Stoudemire (21)	Amar'e Stoudemire (9)	Jeremy Lin (5)	Wells Fargo Center; 20,470	23–24
48	March 23	@ Toronto	L 79–96	Amar'e Stoudemire (17)	Tyson Chandler (11)	Baron Davis (8)	Air Canada Centre; 19,800	23–25
49	March 24	Detroit	W 101–79	Amar'e Stoudemire (17)	Tyson Chandler (17)	Landry Fields (4)	Madison Square Garden; 19,763	24–25
50	March 26	Milwaukee	W 89–80	Carmelo Anthony (28)	Carmelo Anthony (12)	Baron Davis (7)	Madison Square Garden; 19,763	25–25
51	March 28	Orlando	W 108–86	Carmelo Anthony (25); Iman Shumpert (25)	Tyson Chandler (9)	Carmelo Anthony (6); Baron Davis (6)	Madison Square Garden; 19,763	26–25
52	March 30	@ Atlanta	L 90–100	Carmelo Anthony (36)	Carmelo Anthony, Tyson Chandler (9)	Baron Davis (4)	Philips Arena; 18,389	26–26
53	March 31	Cleveland	W 91–75	J.R. Smith (20)	Tyson Chandler (12)	Baron Davis (5)	Madison Square Garden; 19,763	27–26

April : 9–4 (home: 4–1; road: 5–3)

Game	Date	Team	Score	High points	High rebounds	High assists	Location Attendance	Record
54	April 3	@ Indiana	L 104–112	Carmelo Anthony (39)	Tyson Chandler (14)	J.R. Smith (4)	Bankers Life Fieldhouse; 17,042	27–27
55	April 5	@ Orlando	W 96–80	Carmelo Anthony (19)	Tyson Chandler (12)	J.R. Smith (9)	Amway Center; 19,098	28–27
56	April 8	Chicago	W 100–99	Carmelo Anthony (43)	Tyson Chandler (16)	Iman Shumpert (6)	Madison Square Garden; 19,763	29–27
57	April 10	@ Chicago	L 86–98	Carmelo Anthony (29)	Tyson Chandler (15)	Baron Davis (6)	United Center; 22,131	29–28
58	April 11	@ Milwaukee	W 111–107	Carmelo Anthony (32)	Tyson Chandler (11)	Landry Fields (6)	Bradley Center; 15,534	30–28
59	April 13	Washington	W 103–65	J.R. Smith (23)	Tyson Chandler (15)	J.R. Smith (6)	Madison Square Garden; 19,763	31–28
60	April 15	Miami	L 85–93	Carmelo Anthony (42)	Carmelo Anthony (9)	Carmelo Anthony, Iman Shumpert (5)	Madison Square Garden; 19,763	31–29
61	April 17	Boston	W 118–110	Carmelo Anthony (35)	Carmelo Anthony (12)	Carmelo Anthony (10)	Madison Square Garden; 19,763	32–29
62	April 18	@ New Jersey	W 104–95	Carmelo Anthony (35)	Tyson Chandler (10)	Mike Bibby (8)	Prudential Center; 18,711	33–29
63	April 20	@ Cleveland	L 90–98	Steve Novak, Amar'e Stoudemire (15)	Toney Douglas (9)	Toney Douglas, J.R. Smith (6)	Quicken Loans Arena; 19,349	33–30
64	April 22	@ Atlanta	W 113–112	Carmelo Anthony (39)	Amar'e Stoudemire (12)	Baron Davis (10)	Philips Arena; 18,158	34–30
65	April 25	L. A. Clippers	W 99–93	J.R. Smith (21)	Iman Shumpert, Amar'e Stoudemire (7)	Mike Bibby, J.R. Smith (5)	Madison Square Garden; 19,763	35–30
66	April 26	@ Charlotte	W 104–84	J.R. Smith (22)	Josh Harrellson (9)	Mike Bibby (13)	Time Warner Cable Arena; 16,023	36–30

2011–12 season schedule

=== Standings ===
Atlantic Division	W	L	PCT	GB	Home	Road	Div	GP
y-Boston Celtics	39	27	.591	–	24–9	15–18	8–6	66
x-New York Knicks	36	30	.545	3	22–11	14–19	8–6	66
x-Philadelphia 76ers	35	31	.530	4	19–14	16–17	7–6	66
Toronto Raptors	23	43	.348	16	13–20	10–23	7–8	66
New Jersey Nets	22	44	.333	17	9–24	13–20	5–9	66

Eastern Conference
#	Team	W	L	PCT	GB	GP
1	z-Chicago Bulls	50	16	.758	–	66
2	y-Miami Heat *	46	20	.697	4.0	66
3	x-Indiana Pacers *	42	24	.636	8.0	66
4	y-Boston Celtics	39	27	.591	11.0	66
5	x-Atlanta Hawks	40	26	.606	10.0	66
6	x-Orlando Magic	37	29	.561	13.0	66
7	x-New York Knicks	36	30	.545	14.0	66
8	x-Philadelphia 76ers	35	31	.530	15.0	66
9	Milwaukee Bucks	31	35	.470	19.0	66
10	Detroit Pistons	25	41	.379	25.0	66
11	Toronto Raptors	23	43	.348	27.0	66
12	New Jersey Nets	22	44	.333	28.0	66
13	Cleveland Cavaliers	21	45	.318	29.0	66
14	Washington Wizards	20	46	.303	30.0	66
15	Charlotte Bobcats	7	59	.106	43.0	66

=== Player statistics ===
Legend
GP	Games played	GS	Games started	MPG	Minutes per game
FG%	Field-goal percentage	3P%	3-point field-goal percentage	FT%	Free-throw percentage
RPG	Rebounds per game	APG	Assists per game	SPG	Steals per game
BPG	Blocks per game	PPG	Points per game

Player	GP	GS	MPG	FG%	3P%	FT%	RPG	APG	SPG	BPG	PPG
Carmelo Anthony	55	55	34.1	.430	.335	.804	6.3	3.6	1.1	0.4	22.6
Renaldo Balkman	14	0	8.2	.500	.222	.727	1.9	0.4	0.3	0.2	3.0
Mike Bibby	39	4	14.3	.282	.318	.750	1.5	2.1	0.5	0.1	2.6
Tyson Chandler	62	62	33.2	.679	.000	.689	9.9	0.9	0.9	1.4	11.3
Baron Davis	29	14	20.5	.370	.306	.667	1.9	4.7	1.2	0.1	6.1
Toney Douglas	38	9	17.3	.324	.231	.846	1.9	2.0	0.8	0.0	6.2
Landry Fields	66	62	28.7	.460	.256	.562	4.2	2.6	1.2	0.3	8.8
Dan Gadzuric	2	0	6.5	.000	.000	.000	2.5	0.0	0.5	0.5	0.0
Josh Harrellson	37	4	14.6	.423	.339	.615	3.9	0.3	0.6	0.5	4.4
Jared Jeffries	39	4	18.7	.410	.188	.681	3.9	0.7	0.7	0.6	4.4
Jerome Jordan	21	0	5.1	.515	.000	.800	1.3	0.2	0.0	0.3	2.0
Jeremy Lin	35	25	26.9	.446	.320	.798	3.1	6.2	1.6	0.3	14.6
Steve Novak	54	0	18.9	.478	.472	.846	1.9	0.2	0.3	0.2	8.8
Iman Shumpert	59	35	28.9	.401	.306	.798	3.2	2.8	1.7	0.1	9.5
J.R. Smith	35	1	27.6	.407	.347	.709	3.9	2.4	1.5	0.2	12.5
Amar'e Stoudemire	47	47	32.8	.483	.238	.765	7.8	1.1	0.8	1.0	17.5
Bill Walker	32	8	19.4	.398	.319	.850	2.5	1.2	0.6	0.2	5.9

== Playoffs ==
The Knicks finished in seventh place on the year with a record of 36–30 after an up and down season. Knicks rookie guard, Iman Shumpert, tore his ACL and was estimated to be out for 7 months. Landry Fields took his position at Shooting guard in the starting lineup. On May 6, The Knicks snapped the 13 consecutive playoff losses streak, which was an NBA record. During the game, Baron Davis injured his right knee and missed the rest of the playoffs. The Knicks were eliminated in Game 5 of the first round to the Miami Heat.

=== Game log ===
2012 playoff game log
Total: 1–4 (home: 1–1; road: 0–3)
First Round: 1–4 (home: 1–1; road: 0–3)

Game	Date	Team	Score	High points	High rebounds	High assists	Location Attendance	Series
1	April 28	@ Miami	L 67–100	J.R. Smith (17)	Carmelo Anthony (10)	Carmelo Anthony (3)	American Airlines Arena; 19,621	0–1
2	April 30	@ Miami	L 94–104	Carmelo Anthony (30)	Carmelo Anthony (9)	Baron Davis (6)	American Airlines Arena; 19,621	0–2
3	May 3	Miami	L 70–87	Carmelo Anthony (22)	Tyson Chandler (15)	Baron Davis (3)	Madison Square Garden; 19,763	0–3
4	May 6	Miami	W 89–87	Carmelo Anthony (41)	Amar'e Stoudemire (10)	Carmelo Anthony, J.R. Smith (4)	Madison Square Garden; 19,763	1–3
5	May 9	@ Miami	L 94–106	Carmelo Anthony (35)	Tyson Chandler (11)	Mike Bibby (6)	American Airlines Arena; 19,754	1–4

2012 playoff schedule

== Awards, records, and milestones ==
=== Awards ===
- On February 2, Carmelo Anthony was named a 2012 NBA All-Star Game starter for the Eastern Conference.
- On February 13, Jeremy Lin was named Eastern Conference Player of the Week (February 6 though February 12).
- On April 27, Carmelo Anthony was named Eastern Conference Player of the Month for April.
- On May 2, Tyson Chandler was named Defensive Player of the Year for the 2011–2012 season.
- On May 24, Carmelo Anthony was named to the All-NBA Third Team for the 2011–2012 NBA season.
- On May 24, Tyson Chandler was named to the All-NBA Third Team for the 2011–2012 NBA season.
- On June 21, Jeremy Lin was awarded The Epic Award due to the performance he had against the Lakers in this year's first annual NBA Social Media Awards.
- On June 21, Jeremy Lin was awarded The Social Breakout Award due to the highest increase of fan across Facebook and Twitter in this year's first annual NBA Social Media Awards.
- On June 21, Landry Fields was awarded The Snap Shot Award with the photo he took of his couch where Jeremy Lin slept during the season in this year's first annual NBA Social Media Awards.

=== Records ===
- On May 3, the New York Knicks set an NBA worst 13 consecutive playoff losses in an 87–70 loss to the Miami Heat in Madison Square Garden.

=== Milestones ===
- On January 18, Carmelo Anthony scored his 15,000th career point in an 88–91 loss to the Phoenix Suns.
- On April 26, Steve Novak finished the season shooting a league-leading 47% from three-point range.
- On April 26, Tyson Chandler finished the season shooting a league-leading 68% from the field.

== Injuries, surgeries and disciplinary actions ==
- On January 21, Josh Harrellson broke his right wrist against the Denver Nuggets after falling on it in the first of 2 overtimes. He would have successful surgery 3 days later. He had to be sidelined for 6 weeks.
- On February 23, it was announced Iman Shumpert could not participate in the 2012 Slam Dunk Contest due to left patella tendonitis. He had sat out the 2 games following up the announcement and one game after the announcement. He returned the first game after the All-Star break.
- On March 4, Bill Walker underwent left elbow surgery to remove tissue. He missed the next 5 weeks after the surgery.
- On March 21, Jared Jeffries left a game against the Philadelphia 76ers. An MRI later showed that his surgically repaired right knee had been inflamed. Following the MRI, the Knicks announced that he would be out for 2 weeks.
- On April 1, Jeremy Lin underwent surgery to repair a torn meniscus and was out for the season.
- In Game 1 of the first round series against the Miami Heat, rookie Iman Shumpert tore his left ACL and his lateral meniscus, missing the remainder of the season.
- After a Game 2 loss in the same playoff series against Miami, Amar'e Stoudemire cut his hand as a result of punching the glass casing of a fire extinguisher in the locker room area. As a result, he missed the third game of the series after having surgery on his hand.
- In Game 4, Baron Davis tore his ACL, MCL and had a partial rupture in his patella tendon and was out for the season.
- J. R. Smith was fined US$25,000 by the league for posting an inappropriate picture on his Twitter account.

== Transactions ==
=== Overview ===
Players Added

Via draft

- Iman Shumpert

Via free agency

- Mike Bibby
- Jared Jeffries
- Jerome Jordan
- Baron Davis
- Dan Gadzuric
- Jeremy Lin
- Steve Novak
- J. R. Smith

Via trade

- Tyson Chandler
- Josh Harrellson
Players Lost

Via trade

- Andy Rautins
- Ronny Turiaf

Via free agency

- Derrick Brown
- Anthony Carter
- Roger Mason, Jr.
- Shawne Williams
- Shelden Williams

Waived

- Renaldo Balkman
- Chauncey Billups
- Bill Walker
- Chris Hunter

=== Trades ===
June 23, 2011	To New York Knicks Draft rights to Josh Harrelson	To New Orleans Hornets Cash considerations
December 10, 2011	To New York Knicks Tyson Chandler (sign and trade); Draft rights to Ahmad Nivins (from Dallas); Draft rights to Georgios Printezis (from Dallas)	To Dallas Mavericks Andy Rautins; Future second-round pick (from Washington) To Washington Wizards Ronny Turiaf; 2013 second-round pick (from New York); Cash considerations (from New York); 2012 second-round pick (from Dallas)

=== Free agents ===
Additions
Player	Date signed	Former team
Jared Jeffries	December 6	Re-sign
Mike Bibby	December 11	Miami Heat
Jerome Jordan	December 15	BC Krka
Baron Davis	December 19	Cleveland Cavaliers
Steve Novak	December 21	San Antonio Spurs
Jeremy Lin	December 27	Houston Rockets
J. R. Smith	February 17	Denver Nuggets
Dan Gadzuric	April 20	Texas Legends

Subtractions
Player	Date signed	New team
Derrick Brown	December 9	Charlotte Bobcats
Roger Mason, Jr.	December 9	Washington Wizards
Anthony Carter	December 12	Toronto Raptors
Shelden Williams	December 13	New Jersey Nets
Shawne Williams	December 15	New Jersey Nets

Many players signed with teams from other leagues due to the 2011 NBA lockout. FIBA allows players under NBA contracts to sign and play for teams from other leagues if the contracts have opt-out clauses that allow the players to return to the NBA if the lockout ends. The Chinese Basketball Association, however, only allows its clubs to sign foreign free agents who could play for at least the entire season.

Played in other leagues during lockout
Player	Date signed	New team	Opt-out clause
Ronny Turiaf	October 17	ASVEL Basket (France)	Yes

== See also ==
- 2011–12 NBA season
