= Landry Fields =

American basketball executive & player (born 1988)

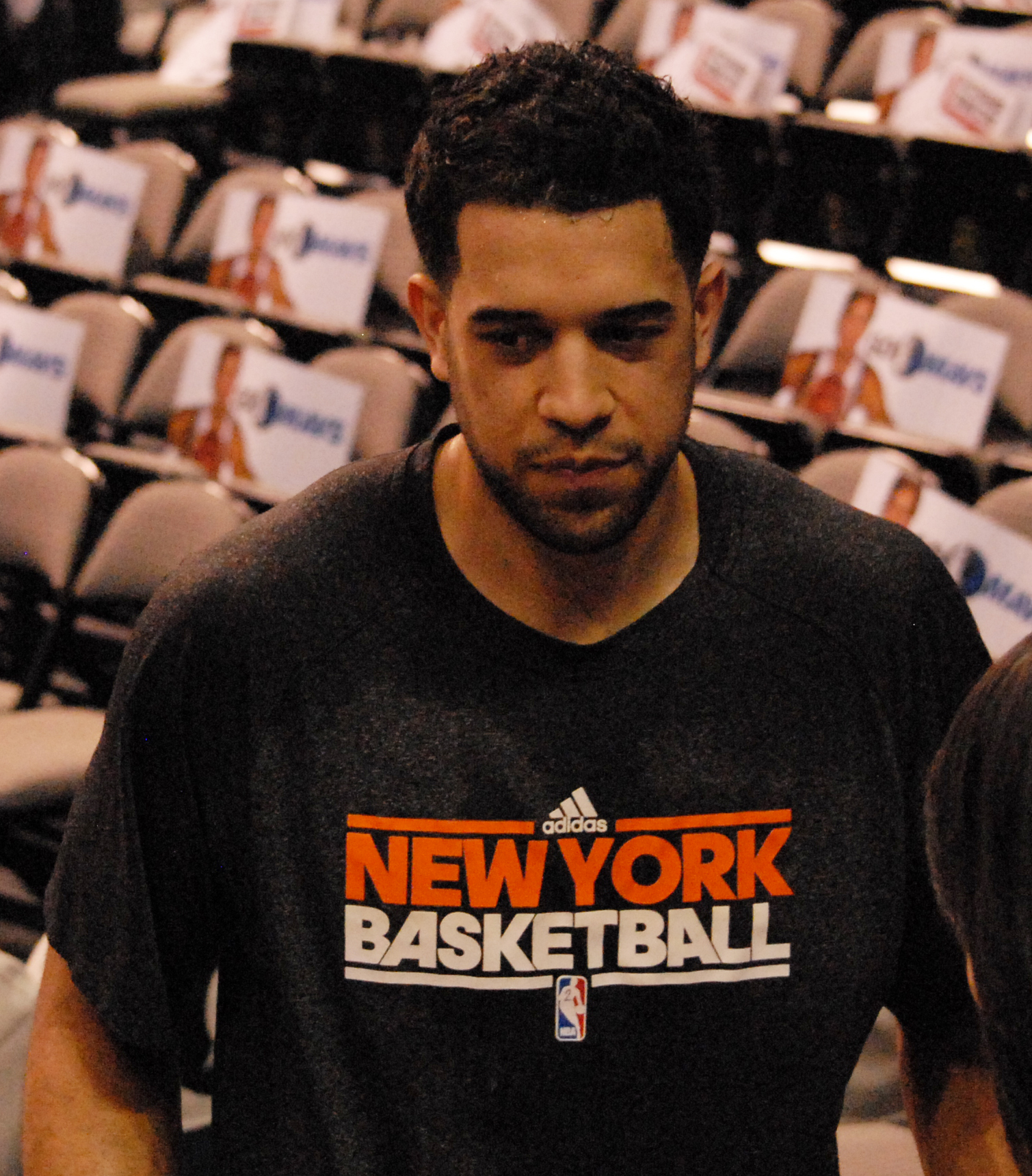
- Fields in March 2012

Personal information
- Born: June 27, 1988 (age 38) Long Beach, California, U.S.
- Listed height: 6 ft 7 in (2.01 m)
- Listed weight: 215 lb (98 kg)

Career information
- High school: Los Alamitos (Los Alamitos, California)
- College: Stanford (2006–2010)
- NBA draft: 2010: 2nd round, 39th overall pick
- Drafted by: New York Knicks
- Playing career: 2010–2015
- Position: Small forward / shooting guard
- Number: 6, 2

Career history
- 2010–2012: New York Knicks
- 2012–2015: Toronto Raptors

Career highlights
- NBA All-Rookie First Team (2011); First-team All-Pac-10 (2010)
- Stats at NBA.com
- Stats at Basketball Reference

Landry Addison Fields (born June 27, 1988) is an American professional basketball executive and former player. He is the former general manager of the Atlanta Hawks of the National Basketball Association (NBA). Fields played five seasons in the NBA for the New York Knicks and Toronto Raptors from 2010 through 2015.

== Early life ==
Fields was born in Long Beach, California, to Steve and Janice Fields. Landry was one of three children and attended Ellwood P. Cubberley Elementary School and later Los Alamitos High School in Los Alamitos, California. Fields was a three-year letter-winner on the varsity basketball squad, which he captained during his junior and senior seasons. Though he was heavily recruited by Arizona coach Lute Olson and by Gonzaga University, Fields ultimately chose to play for Trent Johnson and Stanford, joining twin brothers Robin and Brook Lopez to create one of the top recruiting classes in the nation.

== College career ==
As a freshman at Stanford in 2006–07, Fields appeared in 30 games all off the bench as he averaged 4.1 points and 2.0 rebounds per game. As a sophomore in 2007–08, he again had a very similar role and production to his freshman season as he averaged 4.1 points and 2.0 rebounds in 33 games off the bench.

As a junior in 2008–09, Fields started 33 of 34 games he appeared in as he averaged 12.6 points and a team-best 6.6 rebounds per game.

As a senior in 2009–10, Fields had a break-out season as he earned first-team All-Pac-10 honors after averaging a league-leading 22.0 points and 8.8 rebounds per game. He also earned USBWA All-District IX Team and first-team NABC Division I All-District 20 honors in addition to earning Pac-10 Scholar-Athlete of the Year accolades.

== Professional career ==
=== New York Knicks (2010–2012) ===
Fields was selected with the 39th overall pick in the 2010 NBA draft by the New York Knicks. In July 2010, he joined the Knicks for the 2010 NBA Summer League where he averaged a team-high 15.6 points in addition to 4.8 rebounds and 1.6 steals in five games. On August 26, 2010, he signed his rookie scale contract with the Knicks. He went on to earn Rookie of the Month honors in the Eastern Conference for the months of November and December 2010. On February 6, 2011, he scored a career high 25 points, in addition to 10 rebounds, in the 117–103 win over the Philadelphia 76ers. To cap off his strong rookie season, he was named to the NBA All-Rookie first team.

Landry and teammate Jeremy Lin were selected to play for Team Shaq in the 2012 NBA All-Star Weekend Rising Stars Challenge. Landry was also a member of the New York team that won the Shooting Stars Competition.

On June 26, 2012, the Knicks tendered a qualifying offer to make Landry a restricted free agent.

=== Toronto Raptors (2012–2015) ===
On July 11, 2012, Fields received a three-year, $20 million offer sheet from the Toronto Raptors. The Knicks declined to match the offer, and Fields signed with the Raptors on July 15, 2012.

After his impressive stint with the Knicks, the Raptors expected big things from Landry as he continued to develop. However, Fields struggled with Toronto, partially due to injuries as he played just 81 games over his first two seasons with the franchise. He had several surgeries repairing the ulnar nerve in his right arm, and with constant rehabilitation, he was forced to learn a new shooting form.

=== Injury and retirement ===
Fields became an unrestricted free agent in July 2015. In September 2015, he underwent surgery for a hip labral tear and was subsequently ruled out for five months. He ultimately sat out the entire 2015–16 season.

On September 16, 2016, Fields was named a college scout for the San Antonio Spurs, effectively ending his playing career.

== Career statistics ==
Legend
GP	Games played	GS	Games started	MPG	Minutes per game
FG%	Field goal percentage	3P%	3-point field goal percentage	FT%	Free throw percentage
RPG	Rebounds per game	APG	Assists per game	SPG	Steals per game
BPG	Blocks per game	PPG	Points per game	**Bold**	Career high
*	Led the league

=== NBA ===
==== Regular season ====
Year	Team	GP	GS	MPG	FG%	3P%	FT%	RPG	APG	SPG	BPG	PPG
2010–11	New York	**82**	**81**	**31.0**	**.497**	**.393**	**.769**	**6.4**	1.9	1.0	.2	**9.7**
2011–12	New York	66*	62	28.7	.460	.256	.562	4.2	**2.6**	**1.2**	**.3**	8.8
2012–13	Toronto	51	22	20.3	.457	.143	.642	4.1	1.2	.6	.2	4.7
2013–14	Toronto	30	2	10.7	.403	.000	.636	2.0	.7	.3	.1	2.3
2014–15	Toronto	26	9	8.3	.488	.500	.833	1.0	.6	.4	.0	1.8
Career		255	176	23.6	.473	.332	.666	4.3	1.6	.8	.2	6.8

=== Playoffs ===
Year	Team	GP	GS	MPG	FG%	3P%	FT%	RPG	APG	SPG	BPG	PPG
2011	New York	4	**4**	17.8	.200	.000	.167	1.3	1.3	.5	**.8**	1.8
2012	New York	**5**	**4**	**23.0**	**.484**	**.200**	**.714**	**3.0**	**1.4**	.6	.0	**7.2**
2014	Toronto	3	0	8.7	.000	.000	.000	2.3	.3	**1.3**	.3	.0
Career		12	8	17.7	.375	.111	.462	2.3	1.1	.8	.3	3.6

=== College ===
Year	Team	GP	GS	MPG	FG%	3P%	FT%	RPG	APG	SPG	BPG	PPG
2006–07	Stanford	30	0	14.0	.363	.303	.652	2.5	.7	.2	.1	4.2
2007–08	Stanford	33	0	12.6	.362	.355	.625	2.0	1.0	.3	.2	4.1
2008–09	Stanford	34	33	30.7	.498	.368	.650	6.6	1.9	1.2	.5	12.6
2009–10	Stanford	32	32	36.3	.490	.337	.696	8.8	2.8	1.6	.8	22.0

== Executive career ==
In September 2019, Fields was named general manager of the Austin Spurs of the NBA G League. On October 2, 2020, Fields was named as assistant general manager of the Atlanta Hawks. He was promoted to general manager of the Hawks on June 13, 2022. On April 21, 2025, Fields was fired as general manager.

On January 12, 2026, Fields was hired to serve as the president of league operations for Overtime Elite.

== Television and other media ==
On March 20, 2011, The Andy and Landry Show debuted. The show featured Fields and then-teammate Andy Rautins exploring different areas of New York City. The first episode focused on them visiting the Shubert Theater, with cast members from Tony Award-winning Broadway musical "Memphis." In another episode, they went on a speed-dating event. After Rautins was traded by the Knicks before the 2011–12 season, the show was discontinued.

In May 2014, Fields was a contestant on Sing Your Face Off, a show where celebrities impersonated and sang songs of an artist they were assigned. He sang as Lionel Richie, Pitbull, Enrique Iglesias, Nicki Minaj, MC Hammer, and Little Richard. On June 14, 2014, Fields was announced as the co-runner-up along with Lisa Rinna, while China Anne McClain was named the winner.

== Personal life ==
Fields' father, Steve Fields, played collegiate basketball at Miami of Ohio; he was drafted by the Portland Trail Blazers in 1975, but never played an NBA game. Fields' mother, Janice Fields, played forward at Highline (Washington) Community College. Fields has two aunts, an uncle, and a cousin (Cameron Jones) who also played college basketball.

Fields' father is African-American and his mother is Caucasian. He has a younger sister and an older half-brother.

Fields and his wife have three children.

Fields has publicly identified himself as a Christian. Fields is a close friend of former Knicks teammate Jeremy Lin.
