= 2010–11 New York Knicks season =

2010–11 NBA season by team

- Head coach: Mike D'Antoni
- President: Donnie Walsh
- General manager: Donnie Walsh
- Owner: Madison Square Garden Sports
- Arena: Madison Square Garden

Results
- Record: 42–40 (.512)
- Place: Division: 2nd (Atlantic); Conference: 6th (Eastern)
- Playoff finish: First round (lost to Celtics 0–4)
- Stats at Basketball Reference

Local media
- Television: MSG Network, MSG Plus, WWOR
- Radio: WEPN

The 2010–11 New York Knicks was the 65th season of the New York Knicks in the National Basketball Association (NBA).

With the respective offseason and midseason acquisitions of Amar'e Stoudemire and Carmelo Anthony, the Knicks returned to the playoffs for the first time since 2004 and achieved their first winning season since 2000–01. However, without fellow midseason acquisition Chauncey Billups for the rest of the season after suffering a knee injury, the Knicks would go on to be swept in four games by the Boston Celtics.

== Key dates ==
- June 24 – The 2010 NBA draft took place in New York City.
- July 1 – The free agency period started.

== Draft ==
Round	Pick	Player	Position(s)	Nationality	College / Club
2	38	Andy Rautins	SG	Canada	Syracuse
2	39	Landry Fields	SG/SF	United States	Stanford

The Knicks entered the draft with two second-round pick selections: their own 38th pick and the acquired 39th pick originally from the Los Angeles Clippers, whose selection was sent to New York via Denver Nuggets following a 2008 pick swap agreement. The Knicks had traded their first-round pick to the Phoenix Suns in 2004 to acquire Stephon Marbury; the pick was eventually used by the Utah Jazz to select Gordon Hayward 9th overall.

== Roster ==
2010–11 New York Knicks roster
Players

Pos.	No.	Player	Height	Weight	DOB	From
F	7	Carmelo Anthony	6 ft 8 in (2.03 m)	230 lb (104 kg)	1984-05-29	Syracuse
F	32	Renaldo Balkman	6 ft 8 in (2.03 m)	208 lb (94 kg)	1984-07-14	South Carolina
G	4	Chauncey Billups	6 ft 3 in (1.91 m)	202 lb (92 kg)	1976-09-25	Colorado
F	2	Derrick Brown	6 ft 8 in (2.03 m)	227 lb (103 kg)	1987-09-08	Xavier
G	25	Anthony Carter	6 ft 2 in (1.88 m)	195 lb (88 kg)	1975-06-16	Hawaiʻi
G	23	Toney Douglas	6 ft 2 in (1.88 m)	200 lb (91 kg)	1986-03-16	Florida State
G/F	6	Landry Fields	6 ft 7 in (2.01 m)	210 lb (95 kg)	1988-06-27	Stanford
F	20	Jared Jeffries	6 ft 11 in (2.11 m)	240 lb (109 kg)	1981-11-25	Indiana
G/F	18	Roger Mason Jr.	6 ft 5 in (1.96 m)	212 lb (96 kg)	1980-09-10	Virginia
G	11	Andy Rautins	6 ft 4 in (1.93 m)	190 lb (86 kg)	1986-11-02	Syracuse
F/C	1	Amar'e Stoudemire	6 ft 10 in (2.08 m)	249 lb (113 kg)	1982-11-16	CCHS (FL)
C	14	Ronny Turiaf	6 ft 10 in (2.08 m)	247 lb (112 kg)	1983-01-13	Gonzaga
G/F	5	Bill Walker	6 ft 6 in (1.98 m)	220 lb (100 kg)	1987-10-09	Kansas State
F	3	Shawne Williams	6 ft 9 in (2.06 m)	225 lb (102 kg)	1986-02-16	Memphis
F/C	13	Shelden Williams	6 ft 9 in (2.06 m)	250 lb (113 kg)	1983-10-21	Duke

Coaches
Head coach
- Mike D'Antoni
Assistant(s)
- Kenny Atkinson
- Greg Brittenham
- Dan D'Antoni
- Phil Weber
- Herb Williams

Legend
- (DP) Unsigned draft pick
- (FA) Free agent
- (S) Suspended
- Injured

Roster
Updated: March 1, 2011

== Pre-season ==
=== Game log ===
2010 preseason game log
Total: 3–5 (Home: 2–1; Road: 1–4)
Preseason: 3–5 (home: 2–1; road: 1–4)

Game	Date	Team	Score	High points	High rebounds	High assists	Location Attendance	Record
1	October 3	@ Olimpia Milano	W 125–113	Amar'e Stoudemire (32)	Danilo Gallinari (7)	Raymond Felton (8)	Mediolanum Forum; 10,672	1–0
2	October 6	@ Minnesota	L 100–106	Anthony Randolph (14)	Danilo Gallinari, Ronny Turiaf, Roger Mason (6)	Raymond Felton (4)	Palais Omnisports de Paris-Bercy; 15,532	1–1
3	October 13	Boston	L 101–104	Amar'e Stoudemire (30)	Danilo Gallinari, Anthony Randolph (6)	Raymond Felton (6)	Madison Square Garden; 19,763	1–2
4	October 16	@ Boston	L 84–97	Danilo Gallinari (20)	Landry Fields (7)	Raymond Felton, Toney Douglas (5)	XL Center; 15,318	1–3
5	October 17	Washington	W 92–90	Toney Douglas (23)	Ronny Turiaf (8)	Raymond Felton (8)	Madison Square Garden; 18,792	2–3
6	October 19	New Jersey	W 117–111	Amar'e Stoudemire (39)	Amar'e Stoudemire (11)	Raymond Felton (11)	Madison Square Garden; 18,895	3–3
7	October 20	@ Philadelphia	L 91–118	Raymond Felton (16)	Timofey Mozgov (7)	Toney Douglas (9)	Wells Fargo Center; 6,473	3–4
8	October 22	@ Toronto	L 103–108	Amar'e Stoudemire (24)	Anthony Randolph (6)	Raymond Felton (5)	Bell Centre; 22,114	3–5

2010–11 season schedule

== Regular season ==
=== Standings ===
Atlantic Division	W	L	PCT	GB	Home	Road	Div
y-Boston Celtics	56	26	.683	–	33–8	23–18	13–3
x-New York Knicks	42	40	.512	14	23–18	19–22	10–6
x-Philadelphia 76ers	41	41	.500	15	26–15	15–26	9–7
New Jersey Nets	24	58	.293	32	19–22	5–36	3–13
Toronto Raptors	22	60	.268	34	16–25	6–35	5–11

#	Eastern Conference				
#	Team	W	L	PCT	GB
1	z-Chicago Bulls	62	20	.756	–
2	y-Miami Heat	58	24	.707	4
3	y-Boston Celtics	56	26	.683	6
4	x-Orlando Magic	52	30	.634	10
5	x-Atlanta Hawks	44	38	.537	18
6	x-New York Knicks	42	40	.512	20
7	x-Philadelphia 76ers	41	41	.500	21
8	x-Indiana Pacers	37	45	.451	25
9	Milwaukee Bucks	35	47	.427	27
10	Charlotte Bobcats	34	48	.415	28
11	Detroit Pistons	30	52	.366	32
12	New Jersey Nets	24	58	.293	38
13	Washington Wizards	23	59	.280	39
14	Toronto Raptors	22	60	.268	40
15	Cleveland Cavaliers	19	63	.232	43

=== Game log ===
2010–11 game log
Total: 42–40 (Home: 23–18; Road: 19–22)
October: 1–2 (home: 0–1; road: 1–1)

Game	Date	Team	Score	High points	High rebounds	High assists	Location Attendance	Record
1	October 27	@ Toronto	W 98–93	Wilson Chandler (22)	Amar'e Stoudemire (10)	Raymond Felton (6)	Air Canada Centre; 18,722	1–0
2	October 29	@ Boston	L 101–105	Amar'e Stoudemire (27)	Landry Fields (10)	Raymond Felton (6)	TD Garden; 18,624	1–1
3	October 30	Portland	L 95–100	Wilson Chandler (22)	Wilson Chandler (16)	Raymond Felton (5)	Madison Square Garden; 19,763	1–2

November: 9–7 (home: 3–4; road: 6–3)

Game	Date	Team	Score	High points	High rebounds	High assists	Location Attendance	Record
4	November 4	@ Chicago	W 120–112	Toney Douglas (30)	Amar'e Stoudemire (8)	Raymond Felton (10)	United Center; 21,203	2–2
5	November 5	Washington	W 112–91	Toney Douglas (19)	Toney Douglas (10)	Raymond Felton (10)	Madison Square Garden; 19,763	3–2
6	November 7	Philadelphia	L 96–106	Amar'e Stoudemire (21)	Amar'e Stoudemire (15)	Raymond Felton (10)	Madison Square Garden; 18,735	3–3
7	November 9	@ Milwaukee	L 80–107	Amar'e Stoudemire (19)	Anthony Randolph (9)	Raymond Felton (8)	Bradley Center; 13,286	3–4
8	November 10	Golden State	L 117–122	Amar'e Stoudemire (33)	Amar'e Stoudemire (10)	Raymond Felton (6)	Madison Square Garden; 19,763	3–5
9	November 12	@ Minnesota	L 103–112	Danilo Gallinari (25)	Amar'e Stoudemire, Landry Fields (9)	Raymond Felton (8)	Target Center; 15,232	3–6
10	November 14	Houston	L 96–104	Amar'e Stoudemire (25)	Amar'e Stoudemire (8)	Raymond Felton (5)	Madison Square Garden; 19,763	3–7
11	November 16	@ Denver	L 118–120	Amar'e Stoudemire (24)	Landry Fields (17)	Raymond Felton (11)	Pepsi Center; 15,190	3–8
12	November 17	@ Sacramento	W 113–106	Amar'e Stoudemire, Danilo Gallinari (27)	Amar'e Stoudemire (10)	Ronny Turiaf (4)	ARCO Arena; 12,817	4–8
13	November 19	@ Golden State	W 125–119	Raymond Felton (35)	Amar'e Stoudemire (11)	Raymond Felton (11)	Oracle Arena; 19,808	5–8
14	November 20	@ L.A. Clippers	W 124–115	Amar'e Stoudemire (39)	Amar'e Stoudemire (11)	Raymond Felton (7)	Staples Center; 18,325	6–8
15	November 23	Charlotte	W 110–107	Toney Douglas (22)	Landry Fields, Amar'e Stoudemire (7)	Raymond Felton (9)	Madison Square Garden; 19,763	7–8
16	November 24	@ Charlotte	W 99–95	Raymond Felton (23)	Landry Fields (10)	Raymond Felton (13)	Time Warner Cable Arena; 15,588	8–8
17	November 27	Atlanta	L 90–99	Amar'e Stoudemire (24)	Landry Fields (11)	Raymond Felton (4)	Madison Square Garden; 19,763	8–9
18	November 28	@ Detroit	W 125–116 (2OT)	Amar'e Stoudemire (37)	Amar'e Stoudemire (15)	Raymond Felton (11)	The Palace of Auburn Hills; 16,015	9–9
19	November 30	New Jersey	W 111–100	Amar'e Stoudemire (35)	Wilson Chandler (11)	Raymond Felton (10)	Madison Square Garden; 19,763	10–9

December: 8–5 (home: 5–2; road: 3–3)

Game	Date	Team	Score	High points	High rebounds	High assists	Location Attendance	Record
20	December 3	@ New Orleans	W 100–92	Amar'e Stoudemire (34)	Amar'e Stoudemire (10)	Raymond Felton (13)	New Orleans Arena; 14,020	11–9
21	December 5	@ Toronto	W 116–99	Amar'e Stoudemire (31)	Amar'e Stoudemire (16)	Raymond Felton (8)	Air Canada Centre; 16,891	12–9
22	December 6	Minnesota	W 121–114	Amar'e Stoudemire (34)	Landry Fields (10)	Raymond Felton (11)	Madison Square Garden; 19,763	13–9
23	December 8	Toronto	W 113–110	Amar'e Stoudemire (34)	Amar'e Stoudemire (14)	Raymond Felton (11)	Madison Square Garden; 19,763	14–9
24	December 10	@ Washington	W 101–95	Amar'e Stoudemire (36)	Amar'e Stoudemire (10)	Toney Douglas (6)	Verizon Center; 18,542	15–9
25	December 12	Denver	W 129–125	Amar'e Stoudemire (30)	Landry Fields (9)	Raymond Felton (17)	Madison Square Garden; 19,387	16–9
26	December 15	Boston	L 116–118	Amar'e Stoudemire (39)	Wilson Chandler (12)	Raymond Felton (14)	Madison Square Garden; 19,763	16–10
27	December 17	Miami	L 91–113	Danilo Gallinari (25)	Amar'e Stoudemire (14)	Raymond Felton (10)	Madison Square Garden; 19,763	16–11
28	December 18	@ Cleveland	L 102–109 (OT)	Raymond Felton, Amar'e Stoudemire (23)	Amar'e Stoudemire (11)	Raymond Felton (11)	Quicken Loans Arena; 20,562	16–12
29	December 22	Oklahoma City	W 112–98	Amar'e Stoudemire (23)	Landry Fields (10)	Raymond Felton (10)	Madison Square Garden; 19,763	17–12
30	December 25	Chicago	W 103–95	Amar'e Stoudemire, Raymond Felton (20)	Landry Fields (11)	Raymond Felton (12)	Madison Square Garden; 19,763	18–12
31	December 28	@ Miami	L 98–106	Amar'e Stoudemire (30)	Landry Fields, Amar'e Stoudemire (7)	Raymond Felton (5)	American Airlines Arena; 20,288	18–13
32	December 30	@ Orlando	L 103–112	Amar'e Stoudemire (30)	Wilson Chandler (9)	Raymond Felton (6)	Amway Center; 19,090	18–14

January: 7–8 (home: 5–2; road: 2–6)

Game	Date	Team	Score	High points	High rebounds	High assists	Location Attendance	Record
33	January 2	Indiana	W 98–92	Amar'e Stoudemire (26)	Ronny Turiaf (10)	Toney Douglas (7)	Madison Square Garden; 19,763	19–14
34	January 4	San Antonio	W 128–115	Wilson Chandler (31)	Wilson Chandler, Amar'e Stoudemire (9)	Raymond Felton (7)	Madison Square Garden; 19,763	20–14
35	January 7	@ Phoenix	W 121–96	Amar'e Stoudemire, Raymond Felton (23)	Raymond Felton, Landry Fields (10)	Raymond Felton (11)	US Airways Center; 17,621	21–14
36	January 9	@ L.A. Lakers	L 87–109	Amar'e Stoudemire (23)	Amar'e Stoudemire (10)	Raymond Felton (7)	Staples Center; 18,997	21–15
37	January 11	@ Portland	W 100–86	Amar'e Stoudemire (23)	Ronny Turiaf (10)	Raymond Felton (14)	Rose Garden; 20,604	22–15
38	January 12	@ Utah	L 125–131	Shawne Williams (25)	Raymond Felton (7)	Raymond Felton (11)	EnergySolutions Arena; 19,911	22–16
39	January 14	Sacramento	L 83–93	Amar'e Stoudemire (25)	Amar'e Stoudemire (13)	Raymond Felton (6)	Madison Square Garden; 19,763	22–17
40	January 17	Phoenix	L 121–129	Amar'e Stoudemire (41)	Landry Fields (9)	Raymond Felton (13)	Madison Square Garden; 19,763	22–18
41	January 19	@ Houston	L 89–104	Amar'e Stoudemire (25)	Wilson Chandler (8)	Raymond Felton (5)	Toyota Center; 15,903	22–19
42	January 21	@ San Antonio	L 92–101	Raymond Felton (23)	Amar'e Stoudemire (15)	Raymond Felton (7)	AT&T Center; 18,581	22–20
43	January 22	@ Oklahoma City	L 98–101	Danilo Gallinari (23)	Amar'e Stoudemire (12)	Raymond Felton (7)	Oklahoma City Arena; 18,203	22–21
44	January 24	Washington	W 115–106	Amar'e Stoudemire (30)	Amar'e Stoudemire (9)	Raymond Felton (15)	Madison Square Garden; 19,763	23–21
45	January 27	Miami	W 93–88	Amar'e Stoudemire (24)	Landry Fields (13)	Raymond Felton (7)	Madison Square Garden; 19,763	24–21
46	January 28	@ Atlanta	L 102–111	Amar'e Stoudemire (27)	Shawne Williams (11)	Raymond Felton (13)	Philips Arena; 19,069	24–22
47	January 30	Detroit	W 124–106	Amar'e Stoudemire (33)	Timofey Mozgov (14)	Raymond Felton (5)	Madison Square Garden; 19,763	25–22

February: 5–5 (home: 3–3; road: 2–2)

Game	Date	Team	Score	High points	High rebounds	High assists	Location Attendance	Record
48	February 2	Dallas	L 97–113	Danilo Gallinari (27)	Landry Fields (9)	Raymond Felton (9)	Madison Square Garden; 19,763	25–23
49	February 4	@ Philadelphia	L 98–100	Raymond Felton (26)	Danilo Gallinari (13)	Raymond Felton (9)	Wells Fargo Center; 18,823	25–24
50	February 6	Philadelphia	W 117–103	Amar'e Stoudemire (41)	Landry Fields (10)	Raymond Felton (13)	Madison Square Garden; 19,763	26–24
51	February 9	L.A. Clippers	L 108–116	Amar'e Stoudemire (23)	Landry Fields, Timofey Mozgov (6)	Raymond Felton (12)	Madison Square Garden; 19,763	26–25
52	February 11	L.A. Lakers	L 96–113	Amar'e Stoudemire (24)	Timofey Mozgov (11)	Raymond Felton (7)	Madison Square Garden; 19,763	26–26
53	February 12	@ New Jersey	W 105–95	Wilson Chandler (21)	Wilson Chandler, Danilo Gallinari (8)	Raymond Felton (11)	Prudential Center; 18,711	27–26
54	February 16	Atlanta	W 102–90	Amar'e Stoudemire (23)	Landry Fields, Danilo Gallinari (9)	Raymond Felton (11)	Madison Square Garden; 19,763	28–26
All-Star Break
55	February 23	Milwaukee	W 114–108	Carmelo Anthony (27)	Carmelo Anthony (10)	Chauncey Billups (8)	Madison Square Garden; 19,763	29–26
56	February 25	@ Cleveland	L 109–115	Amar'e Stoudemire (31)	Amar'e Stoudemire (11)	Chauncey Billups (8)	Quicken Loans Arena; 20,562	29–27
57	February 27	@ Miami	W 91–86	Carmelo Anthony (29)	Amar'e Stoudemire (10)	Shawne Williams (4)	American Airlines Arena; 19,702	30–27

March: 7–11 (home: 5–5; road: 2–6)

Game	Date	Team	Score	High points	High rebounds	High assists	Location Attendance	Record
58	March 1	@ Orlando	L 110–116	Chauncey Billups, Amar'e Stoudemire (30)	Landry Fields (11)	Chauncey Billups (6)	Amway Center; 19,131	30–28
59	March 2	New Orleans	W 107–88	Toney Douglas, Amar'e Stoudemire (24)	Anthony Carter, Amar'e Stoudemire (7)	Toney Douglas (5)	Madison Square Garden; 19,763	31–28
60	March 4	Cleveland	L 115–119	Amar'e Stoudemire (41)	Amar'e Stoudemire (9)	Toney Douglas (5)	Madison Square Garden; 19,763	31–29
61	March 6	@ Atlanta	W 92–79	Amar'e Stoudemire (26)	Carmelo Anthony, Amar'e Stoudemire (7)	Carmelo Anthony, Toney Douglas (7)	Philips Arena; 19,560	32–29
62	March 7	Utah	W 131–109	Carmelo Anthony (34)	Jared Jeffries (6)	Toney Douglas, Shelden Williams (6)	Madison Square Garden; 19,763	33–29
63	March 9	@ Memphis	W 110–108	Carmelo Anthony (31)	Landry Fields, Amar'e Stoudemire (6)	Toney Douglas (10)	FedExForum; 17,512	34–29
64	March 10	@ Dallas	L 109–127	Amar'e Stoudemire (36)	Carmelo Anthony (10)	Toney Douglas (8)	American Airlines Center; 20,517	34–30
65	March 13	Indiana	L 93–106	Amar'e Stoudemire (28)	Chauncey Billups, Amar'e Stoudemire (6)	Chauncey Billups (4)	Madison Square Garden; 19,763	34–31
66	March 15	@ Indiana	L 117–119	Carmelo Anthony (29)	Amar'e Stoudemire (10)	Chauncey Billups, Landry Fields (5)	Conseco Fieldhouse; 14,164	34–32
67	March 17	Memphis	W 120–99	Toney Douglas (29)	Amar'e Stoudemire (9)	Chauncey Billups (8)	Madison Square Garden; 19,763	35–32
68	March 18	@ Detroit	L 95–99	Toney Douglas, Amar'e Stoudemire (20)	Amar'e Stoudemire (12)	Toney Douglas (11)	The Palace of Auburn Hills; 22,076	35–33
69	March 20	@ Milwaukee	L 95–100	Amar'e Stoudemire (25)	Amar'e Stoudemire (11)	Toney Douglas (9)	Bradley Center; 18,052	35–34
70	March 21	Boston	L 86–96	Carmelo Anthony (22)	Amar'e Stoudemire (11)	Toney Douglas (4)	Madison Square Garden; 19,763	35–35
71	March 23	Orlando	L 99–111	Carmelo Anthony (24)	Amar'e Stoudemire (7)	Carmelo Anthony (9)	Madison Square Garden; 19,763	35–36
72	March 25	Milwaukee	L 96–102	Amar'e Stoudemire (28)	Amar'e Stoudemire (9)	Chauncey Billups (4)	Madison Square Garden; 19,763	35–37
73	March 26	@ Charlotte	L 106–114	Carmelo Anthony (36)	Shelden Williams (9)	Chauncey Billups (10)	Time Warner Cable Arena; 19,356	35–38
74	March 28	Orlando	W 113–106 (OT)	Carmelo Anthony (39)	Carmelo Anthony (10)	Chauncey Billups (6)	Madison Square Garden; 19,763	36–38
75	March 30	New Jersey	W 120–116	Carmelo Anthony (39)	Carmelo Anthony (10)	Chauncey Billups (6)	Madison Square Garden; 19,763	37–38

April: 5–2 (home: 2–1; road: 3–1)

Game	Date	Team	Score	High points	High rebounds	High assists	Location Attendance	Record
76	April 3	Cleveland	W 123–107	Amar'e Stoudemire (28)	Amar'e Stoudemire (7)	Chauncey Billups (7)	Madison Square Garden; 19,763	38–38
77	April 5	Toronto	W 131–118	Toney Douglas (28)	Carmelo Anthony (9)	Chauncey Billups (9)	Madison Square Garden; 19,763	39–38
78	April 6	@ Philadelphia	W 97–92	Carmelo Anthony (31)	Carmelo Anthony (11)	Amar'e Stoudemire (7)	Wells Fargo Center; 18,375	40–38
79	April 8	@ New Jersey	W 116–93	Carmelo Anthony (25)	Carmelo Anthony (14)	Toney Douglas (9)	Prudential Center; 18,023	41–38
80	April 10	@ Indiana	W 110–109	Carmelo Anthony (34)	Landry Fields (7)	Chauncey Billups (7)	Conseco Fieldhouse; 13,542	42–38
81	April 12	Chicago	L 90–103	Carmelo Anthony (21)	Carmelo Anthony, Toney Douglas (5)	Chauncey Billups (8)	Madison Square Garden; 19,763	42–39
82	April 13	@ Boston	L 102–112	Landry Fields (16)	Landry Fields (7)	Anthony Carter (6)	TD Garden; 18,624	42–40

2010–11 season schedule

== Playoffs ==
=== Game log ===
2011 playoff game log
Total: 0–4 (Home: 0–2; Road: 0–2)
First round: 0–4 (home: 0–2; road: 0–2)

Game	Date	Team	Score	High points	High rebounds	High assists	Location Attendance	Series
1	April 17	@ Boston	L 85–87	Amar'e Stoudemire (28)	Amar'e Stoudemire (11)	Carmelo Anthony, Chauncey Billups (4)	TD Garden; 18,624	0–1
2	April 19	@ Boston	L 93–96	Carmelo Anthony (42)	Carmelo Anthony (17)	Carmelo Anthony (6)	TD Garden; 18,624	0–2
3	April 22	Boston	L 96–113	Shawne Williams (17)	Carmelo Anthony (11)	Carmelo Anthony (6)	Madison Square Garden; 19,763	0–3
4	April 24	Boston	L 89–101	Carmelo Anthony (32)	Amar'e Stoudemire (12)	Anthony Carter (4)	Madison Square Garden; 19,763	0–4

2011 playoff schedule

== Player statistics ==
Legend
GP	Games played	GS	Games started	MPG	Minutes per game
FG%	Field-goal percentage	3P%	3-point field-goal percentage	FT%	Free-throw percentage
RPG	Rebounds per game	APG	Assists per game	SPG	Steals per game
BPG	Blocks per game	PPG	Points per game

=== Regular season ===
New York Knicks statistics
Player	GP	GS	MPG	FG%	3P%	FT%	RPG	APG	SPG	BPG	PPG
Carmelo Anthony^{†}	27	27	36.2	.461	.424	.872	6.7	3.0	.9	.6	26.3
Renaldo Balkman^{†}	3	0	6.0	.250	.500	.000	1.0	0.0	.3	.0	1.0
Chauncey Billups^{†}	21	21	31.6	.403	.328	.902	3.1	5.5	.9	.1	17.5
Derrick Brown	7	0	9.4	.818	1.000	.538	1.1	.3	.1	.1	3.9
Anthony Carter^{†}	18	0	16.1	.444	.269	1.000	2.1	2.1	.9	.2	4.2
Wilson Chandler^{†}	51	30	34.5	.461	.351	.807	5.9	1.7	.7	1.4	16.4
Toney Douglas	80	8	24.3	.416	.375	.792	3.0	3.0	1.1	.1	10.6
Raymond Felton^{†}	54	54	38.4	.423	.328	.867	3.6	9.0	1.8	.2	17.1
Landry Fields	81	80	31.0	.497	.393	.771	6.3	1.9	1.0	.2	9.6
Danilo Gallinari^{†}	48	48	34.8	.415	.347	.893	4.8	1.7	.8	.4	15.9
Jared Jeffries	23	9	19.4	.378	.333	.412	3.4	1.1	1.0	.6	1.8
Roger Mason Jr.	25	0	11.5	.338	.385	.667	1.5	0.6	.2	.1	2.7
Timofey Mozgov^{†}	34	14	13.5	.464	.000	.705	3.1	0.4	.4	.7	4.0
Anthony Randolph^{†}	17	0	7.5	.311	.250	.500	2.4	0.4	.2	.5	2.1
Andy Rautins	5	0	4.8	.429	.250	.500	0.2	0.6	.2	.0	1.6
Amar'e Stoudemire	77	77	37.0	.503	.435	.793	8.2	2.6	.9	1.9	25.4
Ronny Turiaf	63	20	17.9	.627	.000	.622	3.2	1.4	.6	1.2	4.1
Bill Walker	61	1	12.9	.441	.386	.705	2.0	.6	.3	.1	4.9
Shawne Williams	63	11	26.0	.427	.405	.833	3.8	0.7	.6	.8	7.1
Shelden Williams^{†}	16	6	11.8	.543	.000	.815	3.1	0.8	.3	.3	3.8

=== Playoffs ===
New York Knicks statistics
Player	GP	GS	MPG	FG%	3P%	FT%	RPG	APG	SPG	BPG	PPG

- ^{†} Denotes player spent time with another team in the season. Stats reflect time with the Knicks only.

== Awards, records and milestones ==
=== Awards ===
- On November 22, Amar'e Stoudemire was named Eastern Conference Player of the Week (November 15–November 21).
- On December 1, Landry Fields was named Eastern Conference Rookie of the Month (October 26 though November)
- On December 6, Amar'e Stoudemire was named Eastern Conference Player of the Week (November 24-December 3).
- On January 3, Landry Fields was named Eastern Conference Rookie of the Month (Games played through December)

== Transactions ==
=== Trades ===
July 9, 2010

To Golden State Warriors

- (United States) David Lee (sign and trade)
To New York Knicks

- (United States) Kelenna Azubuike
- (United States) Anthony Randolph
- (France) Ronny Turiaf
- Cash considerations
July 9, 2010

To Phoenix Suns

- Protected future second-round pick
To New York Knicks

- (United States) Amar'e Stoudemire (sign and trade)
February 22, 2011

To Denver Nuggets

- (United States) Wilson Chandler
- (United States) Raymond Felton
- (Italy) Danilo Gallinari
- (Russia) Timofey Mozgov
- Future first-round pick
- Two future second-round picks
- Cash considerations
To New York Knicks

- (United States) Carmelo Anthony
- (Puerto Rico) Renaldo Balkman
- (United States) Chauncey Billups
- (United States) Anthony Carter
- (United States) Sheldon Williams
February 22, 2011

To Minnesota Timberwolves

- (United States) Eddy Curry
- (United States) Anthony Randolph
- Cash considerations
To New York Knicks

- (United States) Corey Brewer

=== Free agents ===
==== Additions ====
Player	Signed	Former Team
Amar'e Stoudemire	Signed 5-years contract for $100 Million	Phoenix Suns
Timofey Mozgov	Signed 3-years contract for $9.7 Million	(Russia) Khimki Moscow Region
Raymond Felton	Signed 2-years contract for $15.8 Million	Charlotte Bobcats
Roger Mason	Signed 1-year contract for $1.4 Million	San Antonio Spurs
Shawne Williams	Signed 1-year contract for $850,000	Dallas Mavericks
Jared Jeffries	Undisclosed	Houston Rockets
Derrick Brown	Undisclosed	Charlotte Bobcats

==== Subtractions ====
Player	Reason Left	New Team
Chris Duhon	Free agent	Orlando Magic
Sergio Rodríguez	Free agent	(Spain) Real Madrid
David Lee	Free agent	Golden State Warriors
Al Harrington	Free agent	Denver Nuggets
Tracy McGrady	Free agent	Detroit Pistons
Eddie House	Free agent	Miami Heat
J.R. Giddens	Free agent	Sacramento Kings
Kelenna Azubuike	Waived	Cleveland Cavaliers
Corey Brewer	Waived	Dallas Mavericks
