= 2002–03 Washington Wizards season =

NBA professional basketball team season

- Head coach: Doug Collins
- President: Wes Unseld
- General manager: Wes Unseld
- Owner: Abe Pollin
- Arena: MCI Center

Results
- Record: 37–45 (.451)
- Place: Division: 5th (Atlantic); Conference: 9th (Eastern)
- Playoff finish: Did not qualify
- Stats at Basketball Reference

Local media
- Television: Comcast SportsNet Mid-Atlantic
- Radio: WTEM

The 2002–03 Washington Wizards season was the 42nd season for the Washington Wizards in the National Basketball Association, and their 30th season in Washington, D.C.. This also marked the 15th and final season for All-Star guard, and NBA legend Michael Jordan, who retired for the third and final time at the age of 40.

== Season summary ==
=== Off-season ===
The Wizards received the eleventh overall pick in the 2002 NBA draft, and selected small forward Jared Jeffries out of Indiana University; the team also selected point guard Juan Dixon from the University of Maryland with the 17th overall pick. During the off-season, the team acquired All-Star guard Jerry Stackhouse from the Detroit Pistons, and signed free agents Larry Hughes, Bryon Russell, and Charles Oakley. Retired All-Star center Patrick Ewing was hired as the team's assistant coach.

=== Regular season ===
With the addition of Stackhouse and Hughes, the Wizards got off to a promising 6–4 start to the regular season, but then fell below .500 in winning percentage by posting a six-game losing streak afterwards. The team posted a five-game winning streak between December and January, and later on held a 24–25 record at the All-Star break. However, the Wizards lost 8 of their final 11 games of the season, and finished in fifth place in the Atlantic Division with a 37–45 record, which was the same record as the previous season; the team missed the NBA playoffs for the sixth consecutive year.

Stackhouse averaged 21.5 points and 4.5 assists per game, while Jordan finished second on the team in scoring averaging 20.0 points, 6.1 rebounds, 3.8 assists and 1.5 steals per game, and Hughes provided the team with 12.8 points and 1.3 steals per game. In addition, Tyronn Lue contributed 8.6 points and 3.5 assists per game, while Christian Laettner provided with 8.3 points and 6.6 rebounds per game, and second-year forward Kwame Brown averaged 7.4 points and 5.3 rebounds per game. Meanwhile, Dixon contributed 6.4 points per game, but only played just 42 games due to injury, second-year center Brendan Haywood averaged 6.2 points, 5.0 rebounds and 1.5 blocks per game, and Russell provided with 4.5 points per game.

Jordan played his final NBA game on April 16, 2003, in a 107–87 road loss to the Philadelphia 76ers at the First Union Center. During the NBA All-Star weekend at the Philips Arena in Atlanta, Georgia, Jordan was selected for the 2003 NBA All-Star Game, as a member of the Eastern Conference All-Star team; it was his 14th and final All-Star selection. Jordan scored 20 points despite only making 9 out of 27 field-goal attempts; however, the Eastern Conference lost to the Western Conference in double-overtime, 155–145.

The Wizards finished second in the NBA in home-game attendance behind the Detroit Pistons, with an attendance of 827,093 at the MCI Center during the regular season.

=== Aftermath ===
Following the season, Russell signed as a free agent with the Los Angeles Lakers, while Lue signed with the Orlando Magic, Oakley was released to free agency, and head coach Doug Collins was fired after two seasons with the Wizards. (See 2002–03 Washington Wizards season#Regular season)

== Offseason ==
=== NBA draft ===
Round	Pick	Player	Position	Nationality	College
1	11	Jared Jeffries	Forward	United States	Indiana
1	17	Juan Dixon	Guard	United States	Maryland
2	38	Rod Grizzard	Guard	United States	Alabama
2	39	Juan Carlos Navarro	Guard	Spain	FC Barcelona (Spain)

== Roster ==
2002–03 Washington Wizards roster
Players

Pos.	No.	Player	Height	Weight	DOB	From
C	5	Kwame Brown	6 ft 11 in (2.11 m)	270 lb (122 kg)	1982-03-10	Glynn Academy (GA)
PG	3	Juan Dixon	6 ft 3 in (1.91 m)	164 lb (74 kg)	1978-10-09	Maryland
C	00	Brendan Haywood	7 ft 0 in (2.13 m)	268 lb (122 kg)	1979-11-27	North Carolina
PG	20	Larry Hughes	6 ft 5 in (1.96 m)	184 lb (83 kg)	1979-01-23	Saint Louis
SF	1	Jared Jeffries	6 ft 11 in (2.11 m)	230 lb (104 kg)	1981-11-25	Indiana
SF	23	Michael Jordan	6 ft 6 in (1.98 m)	195 lb (88 kg)	1963-02-17	North Carolina
PF	44	Christian Laettner	6 ft 11 in (2.11 m)	235 lb (107 kg)	1969-08-17	Duke
PG	10	Tyronn Lue	6 ft 0 in (1.83 m)	175 lb (79 kg)	1977-05-03	Nebraska
C	34	Charles Oakley	6 ft 8 in (2.03 m)	225 lb (102 kg)	1963-12-18	Virginia Union
SF	2	Bryon Russell	6 ft 7 in (2.01 m)	225 lb (102 kg)	1970-12-31	Long Beach State
SG	21	Bobby Simmons	6 ft 7 in (2.01 m)	210 lb (95 kg)	1980-06-02	DePaul
SG	42	Jerry Stackhouse	6 ft 6 in (1.98 m)	218 lb (99 kg)	1974-11-05	North Carolina
PF	36	Etan Thomas	6 ft 9 in (2.06 m)	256 lb (116 kg)	1978-04-01	Syracuse
C	55	Jahidi White	6 ft 9 in (2.06 m)	290 lb (132 kg)	1976-02-19	Georgetown

Coaches
Head coach
- Doug Collins
Assistant(s)
- Johnny Bach
- Larry Drew
- Patrick Ewing
- Brian James

Legend
- (DP) Unsigned draft pick
- (FA) Free agent
- (S) Suspended
- Injured

== Regular season ==
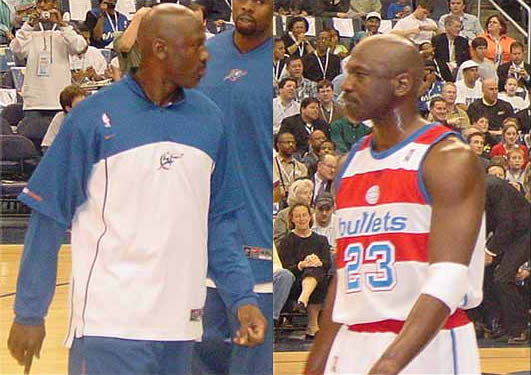
Jordan during warm-ups for the last Wizards home game, on April 14, 2003. The jersey is a throwback to the Washington Bullets uniforms.

After Jordan announced he would return for the 2002–03 season, he was determined to have reinforcements around him. He traded for All-Star Jerry Stackhouse and signed budding star Larry Hughes. Jordan even accepted a sixth-man role to prepare himself for the rigors of the 82-game grind. Still dealing with nagging knee issues, he came off from the bench in the first 15 games. However, a combination of injuries and uninspired play led to Jordan's return to the starting lineup, where he tried to put the team in playoff contention after a 6–9 start. The move led to mixed results, as several of Jordan's younger teammates complained about playing in his immense shadow and as well as what they perceived to be unfair expectations for them.

By the end of the season, the Wizards finished with a 37–45 record once again. At the age of 40, Jordan ended the season as the only Wizard to play in all 82 games. He averaged 20.0 points, 6.1 rebounds, 3.8 assists, and 1.5 steals in 37.0 minutes per game. He also became the only 40-year-old in NBA history to score over 40 points in a game, which he did several times during the season. In addition, Jordan became the oldest NBA player in NBA history to average at least 20 points at the age of 40. This was also the first season in which Jordan was not his team's high scorer, as Stackhouse averaged 21.5 per game. Jordan paced the team in steals (1.5 per game), while Christian Laettner led the team in rebounds (6.6), Stackhouse in assists (4.5) and Brendan Haywood in blocked shots (1.5).

After the season, Wizards' majority owner Abe Pollin fired Jordan as team president, much to the shock of teammates, associates and fans alike. Jordan felt he was betrayed, thinking that he would get his ownership back after his playing days ended, but Pollin justified Jordan's dismissal by noting that Jordan had detrimental effects on the team, such as benching Larry Hughes for Tyronn Lue, making poor trades, and squandering the teams' first round pick at the 2001 NBA draft on high schooler Kwame Brown who never panned out. Despite the signing of future All-Star point guard Gilbert Arenas the team stumbled to a 25–57 record in the 2003–04 season.

Jordan's stint with the Wizards was closely watched by both fans and the media. While the team failed to qualify for the playoffs in either of Jordan's two seasons as a player, despite the Wizards not being in the upper tiers of NBA standings, the team sold-out arenas around the league. The Wizards replaced Jordan's managerial role with general manager Ernie Grunfeld. Although the organization fielded a competitive team built around Arenas for several years, the team again stumbled into the lower echelon of the league in the years following Arenas' numerous off-the-court issues.

Atlantic Division	W	L	PCT	GB	Home	Road	Div
y-New Jersey Nets	49	33	.598	–	33–8	16–25	16–8
x-Philadelphia 76ers	48	34	.585	1	25–16	23–18	17–7
x-Boston Celtics	44	38	.537	5	25–16	19–22	13–12
x-Orlando Magic	42	40	.512	7	26–15	16–25	14–11
e-Washington Wizards	37	45	.451	12	23–18	14–27	11–13
e-New York Knicks	37	45	.451	12	24–17	13–28	9–15
e-Miami Heat	25	57	.305	24	16–25	9–32	5–19

#	Eastern Conference				
#	Team	W	L	PCT	GB
1	c-Detroit Pistons	50	32	.610	–
2	y-New Jersey Nets	49	33	.598	1
3	x-Indiana Pacers	48	34	.585	2
4	x-Philadelphia 76ers	48	34	.585	2
5	x-New Orleans Hornets	47	35	.573	3
6	x-Boston Celtics	44	38	.537	6
7	x-Milwaukee Bucks	42	40	.512	8
8	x-Orlando Magic	42	40	.512	8
9	e-New York Knicks	37	45	.451	13
10	e-Washington Wizards	37	45	.451	13
11	e-Atlanta Hawks	35	47	.427	15
12	e-Chicago Bulls	30	52	.366	20
13	e-Miami Heat	25	57	.305	25
14	e-Toronto Raptors	24	58	.293	26
15	e-Cleveland Cavaliers	17	65	.207	33

== Player statistics ==
Legend
GP	Games played	GS	Games started	MPG	Minutes per game
FG%	Field-goal percentage	3P%	3-point field-goal percentage	FT%	Free-throw percentage
RPG	Rebounds per game	APG	Assists per game	SPG	Steals per game
BPG	Blocks per game	PPG	Points per game

=== Regular season ===
Player	GP	GS	MPG	FG%	3P%	FT%	RPG	APG	SPG	BPG	PPG
Kwame Brown	80	20	22.2	.446	.000	.668	5.3	.7	.6	1.0	7.4
Brian Cardinal	5	0	3.0	.250	.000	1.000	1.0	.2	.0	.0	.8
Juan Dixon	42	3	15.4	.384	.298	.804	1.7	1.0	.6	.1	6.4
Anthony Goldwire^{†}	5	0	6.8	.571	1.000	.800	.6	.2	.0	.0	2.6
Brendan Haywood	81	69	23.8	.510		.633	5.0	.4	.4	1.5	6.2
Larry Hughes	67	56	31.9	.467	.367	.731	4.6	3.1	1.3	.4	12.8
Jared Jeffries	20	1	14.6	.476	.500	.552	2.9	.8	.4	.3	4.0
Michael Jordan	82	67	37.0	.445	.291	.821	6.1	3.8	1.5	.5	20.0
Christian Laettner	76	66	29.1	.494	.125	.833	6.6	3.1	1.1	.5	8.3
Tyronn Lue	75	24	26.5	.433	.341	.875	2.0	3.5	.6	.0	8.6
Charles Oakley	42	1	12.2	.418		.824	2.5	1.0	.3	.1	1.8
Bryon Russell	70	23	19.8	.353	.329	.768	3.0	1.0	1.0	.1	4.5
Bobby Simmons	36	2	10.5	.393	.000	.914	2.1	.6	.3	.1	3.3
Jerry Stackhouse	70	70	39.2	.409	.290	.878	3.7	4.5	.9	.4	21.5
Etan Thomas	38	0	13.5	.492		.638	4.3	.1	.2	.6	4.8
Jahidi White	16	8	14.4	.472		.680	4.6	.1	.1	.8	4.2

- ^{†} Denotes player spent time with another team in the season. Stats reflect time with the Wizards only.

Player statistics citation:

== Award winners ==
- All-Star: Michael Jordan (14th)
