= Jared Jeffries =

American basketball player (born 1981)

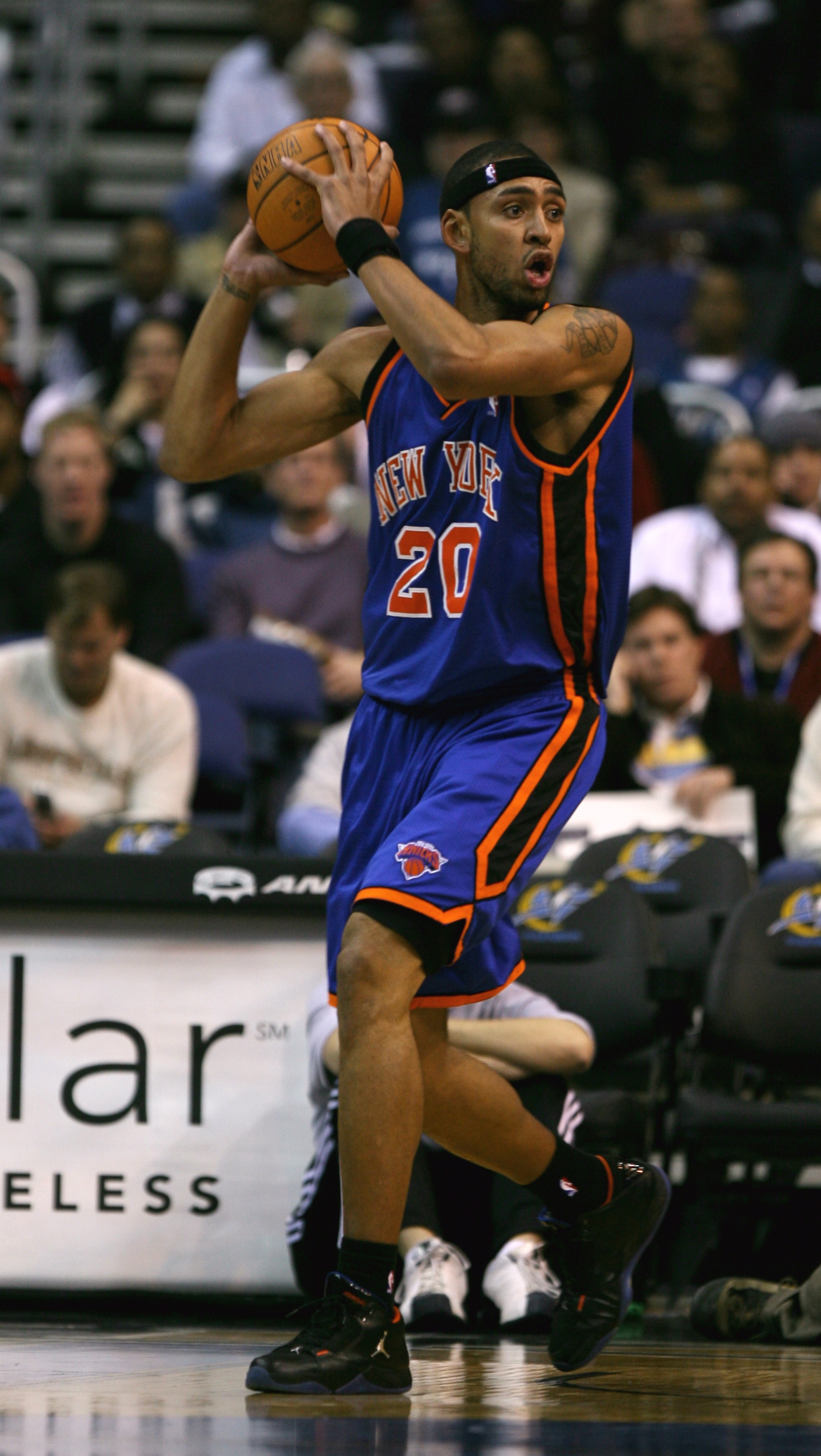
- Jeffries with the New York Knicks in 2007

Personal information
- Born: November 25, 1981 (age 44) Bloomington, Indiana, U.S.
- Listed height: 6 ft 11 in (2.11 m)
- Listed weight: 240 lb (109 kg)

Career information
- High school: Bloomington North (Bloomington, Indiana)
- College: Indiana (2000–2002)
- NBA draft: 2002: 1st round, 11th overall pick
- Drafted by: Washington Wizards
- Playing career: 2002–2013
- Position: Power forward / small forward
- Number: 1, 20, 9

Career history
- 2002–2006: Washington Wizards
- 2006–2010: New York Knicks
- 2010–2011: Houston Rockets
- 2011–2012: New York Knicks
- 2012–2013: Portland Trail Blazers

Career highlights
- Consensus second-team All-American (2002); Big Ten Player of the Year (2002); First-team All-Big Ten (2002); Big Ten Freshman of the Year (2001); Gatorade National Player of the Year (2000); First-team Parade All-American (2000); McDonald's All-American (2000); Indiana Mr. Basketball (2000)

Career NBA statistics
- Points: 3,003 (4.8 ppg)
- Assists: 798 (1.3 apg)
- Rebounds: 2,563 (4.1 rpg)
- Stats at NBA.com
- Stats at Basketball Reference

Jared Scott Carter Jeffries (born November 25, 1981) is an American former professional basketball player. Jeffries was drafted with the 11th overall pick of the 2002 NBA draft by the Washington Wizards. He also played for the New York Knicks, Houston Rockets, and Portland Trail Blazers before retiring in 2013. In college, Jeffries played for the Indiana Hoosiers; during his sophomore year, he was an integral part of the Hoosiers' Cinderella run to the 2002 NCAA Championship game, was named Big Ten Player of the Year, and was a consensus second-team All-American. At 6'11", he mainly played at both forward positions.

Jeffries served as the Director of Player Personnel for the Denver Nuggets from 2016 to 2017.

== High school ==
Before competing in the college ranks, Jeffries attended high school at Bloomington High School North, advancing to the Indiana High School Athletic Association (IHSAA) basketball finals in 2000 before losing to Marion High School, led by fellow future NBA player Zach Randolph. In his last two years in high school, one of his teammates was future North Carolina player Sean May. Jeffries was recognized as the 2000 Indiana Mr. Basketball.

== College ==
Jeffries played basketball for the Indiana University Hoosiers, where he played for two years before forgoing his junior and senior years to enter the NBA draft. Jeffries was recruited by Bob Knight, but Knight was fired shortly before his freshman season. Jeffries was a key cog in the Hoosiers' Cinderella run to the 2002 NCAA title game. Against #1 Duke in the East Regional semifinals, Jeffries had 24 points and 15 rebounds to lead IU to a 74–73 upset victory. Jeffries received the 2002 Silver Basketball from the Chicago Tribune as the Most Valuable Player of the Big Ten. It came to an end when they ran into Maryland in the Championship game.

== Professional career ==
=== Washington Wizards (2002–2006) ===
Jeffries was selected by the Washington Wizards with the 11th pick in the 2002 NBA draft. As a lottery-level pick, Jeffries received a guaranteed three-year contract with the Wizards. Jeffries appeared in 20 games alongside Michael Jordan during his rookie season, which was cut short when he tore his ACL during practice. However, he appeared in all 82 games during his sophomore season and was a regular starter during the 2004–05 season. On October 31, 2004, the Wizards exercised a contract option to keep Jeffries with the team through the 2005–06 season.

=== New York Knicks (2006–2010) ===
The New York Knicks signed Jeffries on August 8, 2006, after the Washington Wizards declined to match the Knicks' offer. Shortly before the 2006 season, Jeffries suffered a wrist injury and missed the first 23 games of the season.

On December 16, 2006, Jeffries was involved in the Knicks–Nuggets brawl. He was suspended for four games.

=== Houston Rockets (2010–2011) ===
On February 18, 2010, Jeffies was traded to the Houston Rockets along with Jordan Hill as part of a three team trade which sent Tracy McGrady to the New York Knicks. Jeffries agreed to a buyout with the Rockets on February 25, 2011.

=== Return to New York (2011–2012) ===
On March 1, 2011, Jeffries rejoined the Knicks.

=== Portland Trail Blazers (2012–2013) ===
On July 16, 2012, Jeffries, Dan Gadzuric, the rights to Greek forward Giorgos Printezis and the 48th pick in the 2012 NBA draft, Kostas Papanikolaou, and a 2016 second-round pick were traded to the Portland Trail Blazers for Kurt Thomas and Raymond Felton.

Jeffries' final NBA game was on March 10, 2013, in a 96 – 98 loss to the New Orleans Hornets where he played for 14 1/2 minutes and recorded no stats other than 2 fouls. On April 18, 2013, the Trail Blazers announced that they had waived Jeffries.

== Post-playing career ==
In September 2013, Jeffries retired from the NBA in conjunction with accepting a front office position with the Denver Nuggets as a pro personnel scout.

In April 2016, Jeffries was promoted to Director of Player Personnel for the Nuggets.

In July 2017, Jeffries was named President of Echo Fox, an eSports organization founded by former NBA player Rick Fox.

On October 18, 2022, Jeffries was a contestant on The Price Is Right, winning a pair of TAG Heuer watches, then a Toyota Corolla playing One Away. His show aired on January 9, 2023. Due to his 6'11" height, he was unable to drive the small car so he gave it to his daughter as a gift.

== Television career ==
In the summer of 2011, Jeffries starred in a dramatic production of Our Town by Thornton Wilder, alongside former Wizards teammates Gilbert Arenas and Etan Thomas, as well as former Boost Mobile spokesman Faizon Love.

During the summer of 2013, Jeffries began filming as the host of a fishing television series documenting his fishing adventures around the world. The show, Modern Fishing with Jared Jeffries, premiered December 30, 2013 on the Outdoor Channel and is now in its fourth season.

== Career statistics ==
Legend
GP	Games played	GS	Games started	MPG	Minutes per game
FG%	Field goal percentage	3P%	3-point field goal percentage	FT%	Free throw percentage
RPG	Rebounds per game	APG	Assists per game	SPG	Steals per game
BPG	Blocks per game	PPG	Points per game	**Bold**	Career high

=== NBA ===
==== Regular season ====
Year	Team	GP	GS	MPG	FG%	3P%	FT%	RPG	APG	SPG	BPG	PPG
2002–03	Washington	20	1	14.6	**.476**	**.500**	.552	2.9	.8	.4	.3	4.0
2003–04	Washington	**82**	38	23.3	.377	.167	.614	**5.2**	1.1	.6	.3	5.7
2004–05	Washington	77	71	26.1	.468	.314	.584	4.9	**2.0**	.9	.5	**6.8**
2005–06	Washington	77	**77**	25.3	.451	.320	.589	4.9	1.9	.8	.6	6.4
2006–07	New York	55	43	23.8	.461	.100	.456	4.3	1.2	.8	.5	4.1
2007–08	New York	73	19	18.2	.400	.160	.527	3.3	.9	.5	.3	3.7
2008–09	New York	56	36	23.4	.440	.083	.611	4.1	1.4	.8	.6	5.3
2009–10	New York	52	37	**28.1**	.443	.323	.645	4.3	1.6	**1.0**	**1.1**	5.5
2009–10	Houston	18	0	18.4	.429	.111	.556	3.6	1.0	.5	.7	4.9
2010–11	Houston	18	0	7.7	.306	.167	.400	1.9	.6	.4	.2	1.5
2010–11	New York	24	9	19.3	.380	.333	.421	3.4	1.0	**1.0**	.6	2.0
2011–12	New York	39	4	18.7	.410	.188	**.681**	3.9	.7	.7	.6	4.4
2012–13	Portland	38	0	9.2	.296	.000	.522	1.6	.4	.2	.2	1.2
Career		629	335	21.6	.426	.250	.583	4.1	1.3	.7	.5	4.8

==== Playoffs ====
Year	Team	GP	GS	MPG	FG%	3P%	FT%	RPG	APG	SPG	BPG	PPG
2005	Washington	**10**	**10**	24.7	**.490**	**.500**	**.765**	4.1	**1.8**	**.9**	.9	6.4
2006	Washington	6	6	**35.8**	.395	.143	**.765**	**6.2**	1.5	.2	1.2	**8.0**
2011	New York	4	0	21.3	.478	.000	.750	5.0	.3	.8	**1.8**	6.3
2012	New York	5	0	6.8	.167	.000	.000	2.4	.0	.2	.0	.4
Career		25	16	23.2	.438	.308	.763	4.4	1.1	.6	.9	5.6

=== College ===
Year	Team	GP	GS	MPG	FG%	3P%	FT%	RPG	APG	SPG	BPG	PPG
2000–01	Indiana	34	34	**32.6**	.442	.245	.620	6.9	**2.4**	.9	1.2	13.8
2001–02	Indiana	**36**	**36**	**32.6**	**.457**	**.380**	**.667**	**7.6**	2.1	**1.5**	**1.3**	**15.0**
Career		70	70	32.6	.450	.325	.643	7.2	2.2	1.2	1.3	14.4

Preceded by Jason Gardner	Indiana Mr. Basketball award 2000	Succeeded by Chris Thomas
