= Anthony Carter (basketball) =

American basketball coach (born 1975)

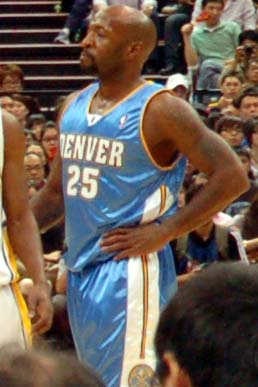
- Carter during his tenure with the Nuggets

Personal information
- Born: June 16, 1975 (age 51) Milwaukee, Wisconsin, U.S.
- Listed height: 6 ft 1 in (1.85 m)
- Listed weight: 190 lb (86 kg)

Career information
- High school: Alonzo A. Crim (Atlanta, Georgia)
- College: Saddleback (1994–1996); Hawaii (1996–1998)
- NBA draft: 1998: undrafted
- Playing career: 1998–2012
- Position: Point guard
- Number: 25, 7, 4
- Coaching career: 2013–present

Career history

Playing
- 1998–1999: Yakima Sun Kings
- 1999–2003: Miami Heat
- 2003: San Antonio Spurs
- 2004–2006: Minnesota Timberwolves
- 2007: Scafati Basket
- 2007–2011: Denver Nuggets
- 2011: New York Knicks
- 2011–2012: Toronto Raptors

Coaching
- 2013–2015: Austin Toros / Spurs (assistant)
- 2015–2016: Sacramento Kings (assistant)
- 2016–2018: Sioux Falls Skyforce (assistant)
- 2018–2023: Miami Heat (player development)
- 2023–2025: Memphis Grizzlies (assistant)

Career highlights
- WAC Player of the Year (1997); First-team All-WAC (1997); Hawaii Rainbow Warriors No. 23 retired
- Stats at NBA.com
- Stats at Basketball Reference

Anthony Bernard Carter (born June 16, 1975) is an American basketball coach and former player who is an assistant coach. He played college basketball for Saddleback College and the Hawaii Rainbow Warriors.

== Early life ==
Born in Milwaukee, WI, Carter played as a freshman on the varsity team of Alonzo A. Crim High School in Atlanta. However, after his freshman year, Carter quit high school. After leaving school, Carter spent his teenage years playing basketball for money in Atlanta. The Rocky Mountain News quoted Carter stating: "The dope man would put up the money, and we would play. We used to play for the drug dealers. That's how we were going to make our money. We didn't sell the drugs ... (I used the money) to buy shoes and food. That was the only way we could eat." During his teenage years, Carter's mother was on drugs, and all seven of his uncles were at one point in prison.

Realizing Carter's basketball skills could earn him an education, several members of Carter's community helped him get a GED and enroll in college.

== College career ==
Carter played collegiately at Saddleback Community College in Mission Viejo, California (1994–96), then went on to play at the University of Hawaiʻi at Mānoa. At UH, Carter became the Rainbow Warriors' career leader in assist average and one of only 10 players to reach 1,000 points.

== Professional career ==
After going undrafted in the 1998 NBA draft, he began his NBA career with the Miami Heat, after having spent one season with CBA's Yakima Sun Kings.

In 2003, Carter's agent failed to notify the Heat that Carter wished to exercise a $4.1 million player option on his contract by the June 30 deadline. The failure allowed the team to renounce their rights to Carter, opening up cap space that was later used to sign Lamar Odom.

Carter later signed with the San Antonio Spurs. However, after only five games, the Spurs waived him due to injury, and he remained inactive throughout 2003–04.

After two relatively uneventful seasons with the Minnesota Timberwolves (2004–06), on April 12, 2007, the Denver Nuggets signed Carter for the remainder of the season, after he started the year with Italy's Scafati Basket. He was waived by the team on August 29, and re-signed two days later.

On December 20, 2007, Carter hit a runner in the lane with 0.8 seconds left in double overtime against the Houston Rockets, which gave the Nuggets a 112–111 win. In that season, he recorded individual records in most statistical categories, averaging a career-high 8 ppg, while starting all but three of the games he appeared in.

On July 1, 2008, Carter became a free agent, but re-signed with Denver in October.

On August 14, 2009, the Nuggets again re-signed Carter to a one-year contract for $1.3 million.

On July 14, 2010, he re-signed with the Nuggets to a one-year contract worth $1.3 million.

On February 22, 2011, Carter was traded to the New York Knicks in a three-way deal which also involved the Minnesota Timberwolves that brought Carmelo Anthony to New York. Considered a throw-in in the trade, Carter forever cemented his place in Knicks lore when he nearly singlehandedly rallied New York to a playoff victory in an elimination game against the Boston Celtics on April 24, 2011. Carter substituted into the game with the Knicks trailing by 23 and brought life back to the Garden by suffocating Rajon Rondo on defense, scoring 11 points, and dishing four dimes. However, the Knicks' comeback bid ultimately fell short.

On December 12, 2011, Carter signed with the Toronto Raptors. He was waived by the Raptors on March 15, 2012. In October 2012, he re-joined the Nuggets for their training camp, but did not make the team's final roster.

== Coaching career ==
In September 2013, Carter was named an assistant coach with the Austin Spurs of the NBA Development League.

On July 31, 2015, Carter was hired by the Sacramento Kings to be an assistant coach.

On September 22, 2016, Carter was named assistant coach for the Sioux Falls Skyforce of the D-League.

On September 21, 2018, Carter was named to the staff of the Heat as player development coach.

== Personal life ==
Carter's son Devin Carter was drafted 13th in the 2024 NBA draft to the Sacramento Kings, and played college basketball at Providence.

While Carter was in fifth grade at Atlanta's Fred A. Toomer Elementary School, his class was adopted by the "I Have a Dream" foundation. In 2003, he was appointed as the first-ever spokesperson for the foundation.

Carter donated $100,000 to fund scholarships at the University of Hawaii.

Carter became the second Rainbow Warrior player to have his number retired, as the university retired his No. 23 jersey on February 21, 2026, during halftime of a home game against UC Santa Barbara.

== NBA career statistics ==
Legend
GP	Games played	GS	Games started	MPG	Minutes per game
FG%	Field goal percentage	3P%	3-point field goal percentage	FT%	Free throw percentage
RPG	Rebounds per game	APG	Assists per game	SPG	Steals per game
BPG	Blocks per game	PPG	Points per game	**Bold**	Career high

=== Regular season ===
Year	Team	GP	GS	MPG	FG%	3P%	FT%	RPG	APG	SPG	BPG	PPG
1999–00	Miami	**79**	30	23.5	.395	.130	.750	2.5	4.8	1.2	.1	6.3
2000–01	Miami	72	6	22.6	.406	.150	.631	2.5	3.7	1.0	.1	6.4
2001–02	Miami	46	18	22.8	.342	.053	.528	2.5	4.7	1.1	.1	4.3
2002–03	Miami	49	26	18.6	.356	.000	.660	1.7	4.1	.9	.1	4.1
2003–04	San Antonio	5	2	17.4	.297	.000	.000	2.2	2.4	.8	.0	4.4
2004–05	Minnesota	66	12	11.2	.407	.118	.686	1.0	2.4	.5	.3	2.7
2005–06	Minnesota	45	8	13.1	.387	.267	.727	1.4	2.2	.5	.2	3.3
2006–07	Denver	2	0	18.5	.375	.000	.000	1.5	**5.5**	.0	**.5**	3.0
2007–08	Denver	70	**67**	**28.0**	.458	**.349**	.753	**2.9**	**5.5**	**1.5**	.4	**7.8**
2008–09	Denver	78	5	22.9	.433	.239	.731	2.6	4.7	1.2	.2	5.3
2009–10	Denver	54	7	15.9	.420	.270	.846	1.6	3.0	.7	.2	3.3
2010–11	Denver	14	0	10.9	.333	.333	**1.000**	.9	1.9	.6	.1	1.9
2010–11	New York	19	0	16.3	**.461**	.286	**1.000**	2.1	2.3	.9	.3	4.4
2011–12	Toronto	24	0	8.7	.321	.294	.800	1.4	1.4	.3	.2	2.0
Career		623	181	19.6	.404	.250	.706	2.1	3.8	1.0	.2	4.8

=== Playoffs ===
Year	Team	GP	GS	MPG	FG%	3P%	FT%	RPG	APG	SPG	BPG	PPG
2000	Miami	10	**3**	**27.5**	.416	.167	.750	**4.0**	**5.6**	**1.2**	.2	7.7
2001	Miami	3	1	23.0	.474	.000	.000	2.0	3.7	.7	**.3**	6.0
2007	Denver	1	0	14.0	**1.000**	.000	.000	1.0	2.0	.0	.0	**8.0**
2008	Denver	4	1	15.3	.286	.000	.000	2.5	3.5	.3	**.3**	2.0
2009	Denver	**16**	0	14.3	.408	.167	.500	2.0	2.1	.9	.1	2.8
2010	Denver	1	0	7.0	.000	.000	.000	.0	3.0	.0	.0	.0
2011	New York	4	0	12.3	.533	**.333**	**1.000**	2.0	1.5	.5	**.3**	4.8
Career		39	5	18.0	.430	.148	.696	2.5	3.2	.8	.2	4.5
