= Roger Mason Jr. =

American basketball player (born 1980)

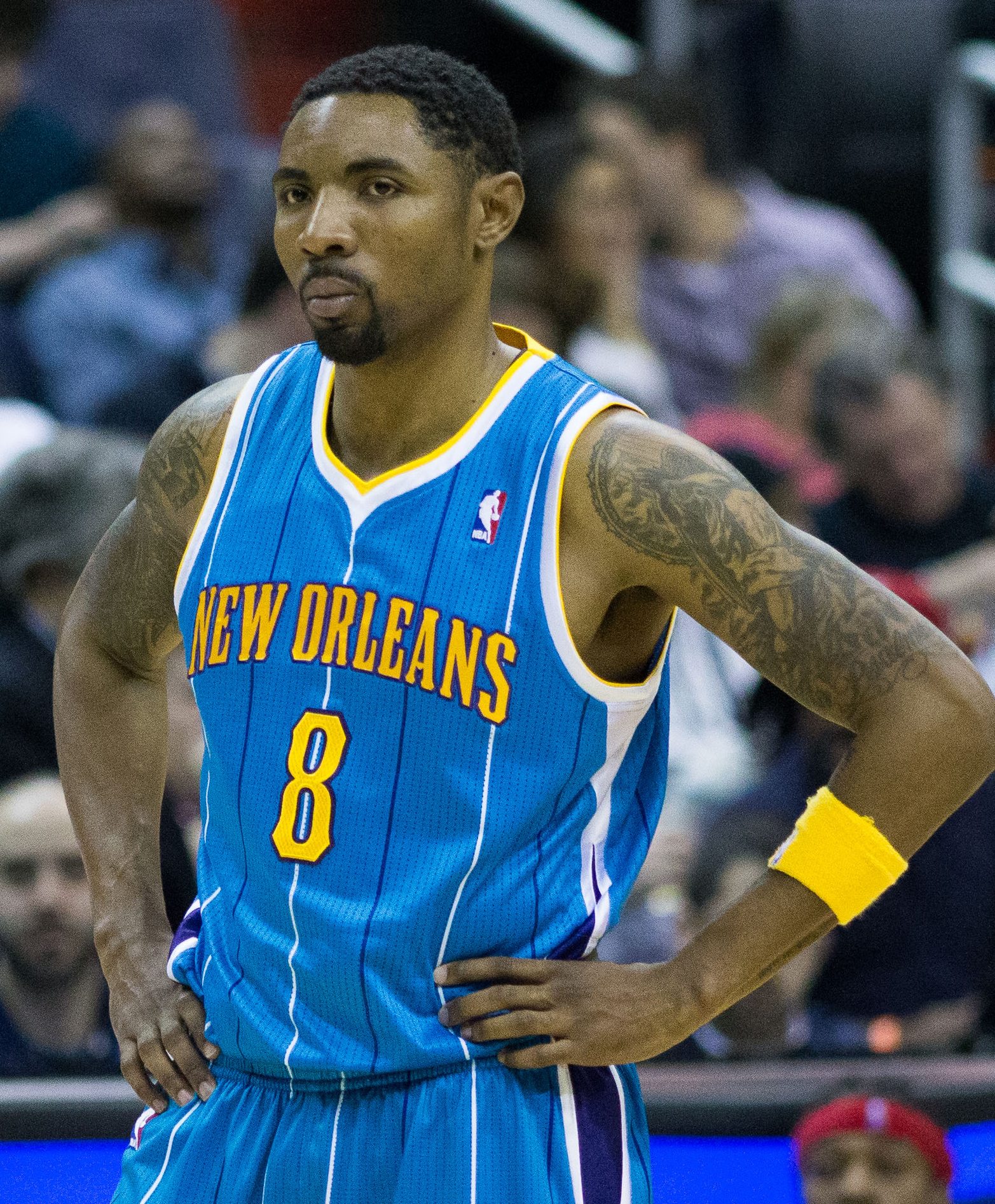
- Mason with the New Orleans Hornets in 2013

Personal information
- Born: September 10, 1980 (age 46) Washington, D.C., U.S.
- Listed height: 6 ft 5 in (1.96 m)
- Listed weight: 205 lb (93 kg)

Career information
- High school: Sidwell Friends School (Washington, D.C.); Good Counsel (Olney, Maryland)
- College: Virginia (1999–2002)
- NBA draft: 2002: 2nd round, 31st overall pick
- Drafted by: Chicago Bulls
- Playing career: 2002–2014
- Position: Shooting guard / small forward
- Number: 31, 8, 18, 21

Career history
- 2002–2003: Chicago Bulls
- 2003–2004: Toronto Raptors
- 2005: Olympiacos
- 2005–2006: Hapoel Jerusalem
- 2006–2008: Washington Wizards
- 2008–2010: San Antonio Spurs
- 2010–2011: New York Knicks
- 2011–2012: Washington Wizards
- 2012–2013: New Orleans Hornets
- 2013–2014: Miami Heat

Career highlights
- Second-team All-ACC (2002); Third-team All-ACC (2001)
- Stats at NBA.com
- Stats at Basketball Reference
Medals
Men's basketball
Representing United States
Summer Universiade
Bronze medal – third place	2001 Beijing	Team competition

Roger Philip Mason Jr. (born September 10, 1980) is an American former professional basketball player. He is the former deputy executive director of the NBA Players Association. He is the former president and commissioner of Big3.

== Early career ==
Mason lived in Silver Spring, Maryland where he attended primary school at Calvary Lutheran School. He first attended high school at Sidwell Friends School where he was named MVP at the school as a freshman. He then transferred to Our Lady of Good Counsel High School for his sophomore, junior, and senior years. Mason led Good Counsel to their best basketball year ever, with 29 wins and a number 19 final ranking on the USA Today Super 25 list. At Good Counsel he scored a total of 1,426 points. He was named 1999 All-Metropolitan first team by The Washington Post, All-Washington Catholic Athletic Conference (WCAC), and all-county by the Montgomery Journal newspaper. He was also named 1999 Powerade "Mr. Basketball", awarded to the best player in the Washington, D.C. area.

== College career ==
Mason played collegiately at the University of Virginia (UVA). In 2001, he was named to the All-Atlantic Coast Conference (ACC) third team. Mason set a free throw percentage record in UVA history with 86.89 percent made (since passed by Malcolm Brogdon) and is currently fourth on the ACC's all-time list for free throw percentage.

== Professional career ==
=== NBA ===
Mason was selected with the 31st overall pick by the Chicago Bulls in the 2002 NBA draft after his junior year. On August 12, 2002, he signed a multi-year deal with the Bulls.

On December 15, 2003, he was traded to the Toronto Raptors for Rick Brunson. On December 16, 2004, he was waived by the Raptors.

In September 2006, he signed a one-year deal with the Washington Wizards. In September 2007, he re-signed with the Wizards on a one-year deal. His role significantly expanded during the season when Gilbert Arenas and Antonio Daniels were injured. He responded by putting up the best numbers in his NBA career.

On July 11, 2008, Mason was signed to the San Antonio Spurs for a two-year $7.3 million contract. On Christmas Day 2008, he made a buzzer-beating three-point shot to beat the Phoenix Suns. Mason would finish the season with career highs in points, rebounds, and assists per game and it was also his only time to play all 82 games of a season.

On August 10, 2010, Mason signed a contract with the New York Knicks.

On December 9, 2011, Mason signed a one-year veteran minimum contract with the Washington Wizards. On April 16, 2012, Mason was waived by the Wizards to create a roster spot for Morris Almond.

On August 3, 2012, Mason signed a contract with the New Orleans Hornets.

On September 27, 2013, Mason signed with the Miami Heat.

On February 20, 2014, Mason was traded to the Sacramento Kings in exchange for a future conditional 2015 second-round pick. He was later waived the same day.

=== International ===
In January 2005, he signed with Olympiacos of Greece for the rest of the 2004–05 season. Later that year, he signed with Hapoel Jerusalem for the 2005–06 season, which got sponsored by billionaire Arkadi Gaydamak shortly before the season started. He quickly became a major player of the team and led it to the Uleb Cup semi-finals and to the Israeli League Finals.

=== Big Three Commissioner ===
Mason served as commissioner of the Big Three league in 2017 and was fired in March 2018, for "corrupt practices".

== NBA career statistics ==
Legend
GP	Games played	GS	Games started	MPG	Minutes per game
FG%	Field goal percentage	3P%	3-point field goal percentage	FT%	Free throw percentage
RPG	Rebounds per game	APG	Assists per game	SPG	Steals per game
BPG	Blocks per game	PPG	Points per game	**Bold**	Career high
*	Led the league

=== Regular season ===
Year	Team	GP	GS	MPG	FG%	3P%	FT%	RPG	APG	SPG	BPG	PPG
2002–03	Chicago	17	0	6.6	.355	.333	**1.000**	.7	.7	.2	.0	1.8
2003–04	Chicago	3	0	14.3	.091	.167	-	1.0	1.0	.3	.0	1.0
2003–04	Toronto	23	3	12.4	.356	.364	.864	1.2	1.0	.4	**.3**	4.0
2006–07	Washington	62	0	7.9	.330	.324	.875	.7	.6	.2	.1	2.7
2007–08	Washington	80	9	21.4	**.443**	.398	.873	1.6	1.7	**.5**	.2	9.1
2008–09	San Antonio	**82***	**71**	**30.4**	.425	**.421**	.890	**3.1**	**2.1**	**.5**	.1	**11.8**
2009–10	San Antonio	79	5	19.2	.389	.333	.794	2.1	1.7	.4	.2	6.3
2010–11	New York	26	0	12.3	.338	.364	.700	1.7	.8	.2	.1	2.9
2011–12	Washington	52	0	13.4	.399	.383	.778	1.3	.9	.3	.1	5.5
2012–13	New Orleans	69	13	17.7	.433	.415	.907	1.9	1.1	.4	.2	5.3
2013–14	Miami	25	2	10.4	.373	.354	**1.000**	.9	.8	.2	.0	3.0
Career		518	103	17.7	.408	.383	.866	1.7	1.3	.4	.1	6.3

=== Playoffs ===
Year	Team	GP	GS	MPG	FG%	3P%	FT%	RPG	APG	SPG	BPG	PPG
2007	Washington	4	0	14.0	**.438**	**.500**	**.833**	.5	.3	.3	.0	6.0
2008	Washington	**6**	0	21.5	.404	.235	.750	.8	1.0	**.5**	**.2**	**8.0**
2009	San Antonio	5	**3**	**21.6**	.375	.368	.667	**1.6**	**1.8**	.2	.0	6.6
2010	San Antonio	**6**	0	10.2	.083	.143	-	.7	.3	.2	.0	.5
2011	New York	3	0	18.3	.389	.385	-	1.3	1.0	.3	.0	6.3
Career		24	3	17.0	.368	.333	.765	1.0	.9	.3	.0	5.3
