= Shelden Williams =

American former professional basketball player

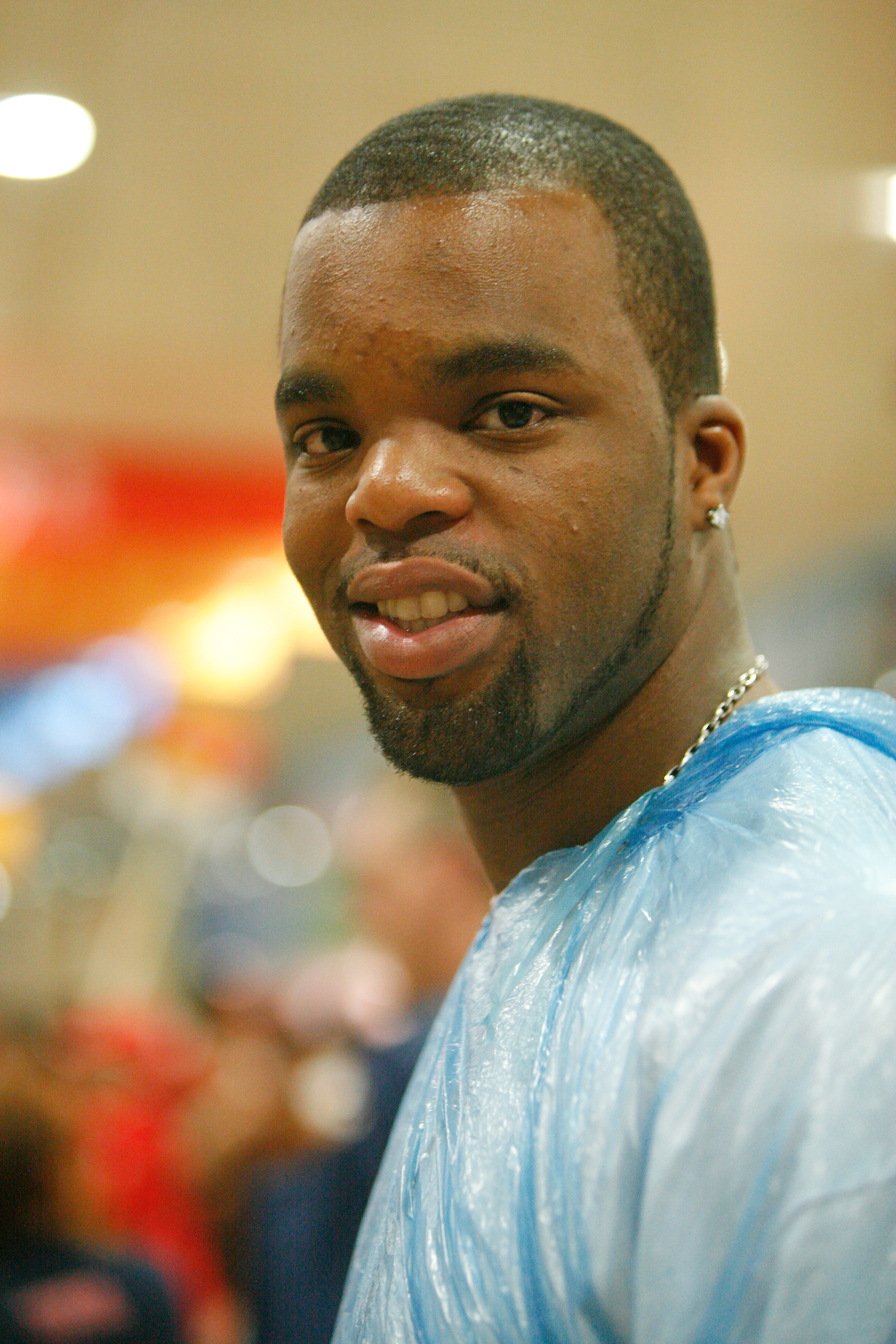
- Williams in 2008

Personal information
- Born: October 21, 1983 (age 43) Oklahoma City, Oklahoma, U.S.
- Listed height: 6 ft 9 in (2.06 m)
- Listed weight: 250 lb (113 kg)

Career information
- High school: Midwest City (Midwest City, Oklahoma)
- College: Duke (2002–2006)
- NBA draft: 2006: 1st round, 5th overall pick
- Drafted by: Atlanta Hawks
- Playing career: 2006–2015
- Position: Power forward / center
- Number: 33, 22, 23, 13
- Coaching career: 2018–present

Career history

Playing
- 2006–2008: Atlanta Hawks
- 2008–2009: Sacramento Kings
- 2009: Minnesota Timberwolves
- 2009–2010: Boston Celtics
- 2010–2011: Denver Nuggets
- 2011: New York Knicks
- 2011–2012: New Jersey Nets
- 2012–2013: Élan Chalon
- 2013–2015: Tianjin Ronggang

Coaching
- 2018–2020: Erie BayHawks / College Park Skyhawks (assistant)

Career highlights
- 2× NABC Defensive Player of the Year (2005, 2006); Consensus first-team All-American (2006); Third-team All-American – AP (2005); 2× First-team All-ACC (2005, 2006); Second-team All-ACC (2004); No. 23 retired by Duke Blue Devils; USA Basketball Male Athlete of the Year (2005); Fourth-team Parade All-American (2001)
- Stats at NBA.com
- Stats at Basketball Reference
Medals
Men's basketball
Representing United States
Summer Universiade
Gold medal – first place	2005 Izmir	Team competition

Shelden DeMar Williams (born October 21, 1983) is an American former professional basketball player. Nicknamed "the Landlord", he played college basketball for the Duke Blue Devils, and later played in the NBA for parts of seven seasons.

Williams earned the 2005 and 2006 NABC Defensive Player of the Year Awards while at Duke, becoming only the fifth player in history to earn the award two consecutive years. He holds Duke's career blocks record, single-season blocks record, and career rebounding record.

== High school career ==
During high school, Williams was a member of the National Honor Society and the Fellowship of Christian Athletes.

- 2002 EA Sports High School All-America selection
- Gatorade Oklahoma Player of the Year: 2001, 2002
- 2001 USA Today Oklahoma Player of the Year
- Oklahoma Player of the Year in 2001 by the Daily Oklahoman
- Oklahoma Defensive Player of the Year: 2000, 2001
- Ranked number 49 in the nation among all players by ESPN.com following his senior season (averaging 20 points, 12 rebounds, three blocked shots and three assists as a senior)
- Rated the nation's fifth-best prep player by Future Stars and BlueChipHoops.com and sixth by College Basketball News entering the 2001–02 season
- The Sporting News listed Williams as the nation's sixth-best prep player entering 2001–02
- Rated the nation's number one forward by Basketball News and Prepstar
- Three-time all-state, all-district and all-city selection (1999–2001)
- 2001 Parade All-America

== College career ==
Williams played for the Duke University men's basketball team from 2002 to 2006. He majored in sociology with a markets and management studies certificate.

Williams became only the third Duke basketball player to record a triple-double when Duke defeated Maryland on January 11, 2006, recording 19 points, 11 rebounds and 10 blocks.

On January 28, 2007, Duke retired Williams' No. 23 jersey.

Williams is the third player in ACC history to have 1,500 points, 1,000 rebounds, 350 blocks and 150 steals (joining Tim Duncan and Ralph Sampson). His 1,217 rebounds and 1,859 career points rank him seventh in ACC history and sixteenth in Duke history, respectively.

=== Records ===
As of graduating from Duke University, Williams held records for:

- Duke all-time leader in blocked shots (422)
- Duke all-time leader in rebounds
- Duke single season blocked shots

=== Awards ===
- National Association of Basketball Coaches Defensive Player of the Year: 2005, 2006
- Associated Press First Team All American: 2006
- John R. Wooden First Team All American: 2006
- Senior CLASS All-Senior All American Team: 2006
- John R. Wooden National Player of the Year Finalist: 2006
- NBA Rookie of the Month: April 2007

== Professional career ==
=== Atlanta Hawks (2006–2008) ===
Williams was selected by the Atlanta Hawks with the fifth overall pick in the 2006 NBA draft. On July 10, 2006, he signed his rookie scale contract with the Hawks. On November 1, Williams made his NBA debut, recording three rebounds and one block in a 75–88 loss to the Philadelphia 76ers. On April 16, 2007, he logged a season-high 17 rebounds, alongside 16 points, in a 96–102 loss to the Milwaukee Bucks. A day later, he scored a season-high 21 points, alongside ten rebounds, in a 118–102 win over the Indiana Pacers. Williams was named the NBA Eastern Conference Rookie of the Month for games played in April.

=== Sacramento Kings (2008–2009) ===
On February 16, 2008, Williams was traded, alongside Anthony Johnson, Tyronn Lue, Lorenzen Wright and a 2008 second-round pick, to the Sacramento Kings in exchange for Mike Bibby. On April 15, Williams logged a season-high 11 rebounds, alongside 12 points and three steals, in a 101–124 loss to the Los Angeles Lakers. He averaged 0.7 points per game.

=== Minnesota Timberwolves (2009) ===
On February 19, 2009, Williams was traded, alongside Bobby Brown, to the Minnesota Timberwolves in exchange for Rashad McCants and Calvin Booth.

=== Boston Celtics (2009–2010) ===
On August 7, 2009, Williams signed a one-year contract with the Boston Celtics.

=== Denver Nuggets (2010–2011) ===
On July 14, 2010, Williams signed a one-year contract with the Denver Nuggets.

=== New York Knicks (2011) ===
On February 22, 2011, Williams was traded to the New York Knicks in a three-way blockbuster deal also involving Minnesota Timberwolves that brought Carmelo Anthony to New York.

=== New Jersey Nets (2011–2012) ===
On December 13, 2011, Williams signed with the New Jersey Nets.

=== Élan Chalon (2012–2013) ===
On August 28, 2012, Williams signed a one-year contract with the French League champions Élan Chalon. Over 10 games in the 2012–13 Euroleague season, he averaged 11.3 points and 7.6 rebounds per game.

=== Tianjin Ronggang (2013–2015) ===
In October 2013, Williams signed with Tianjin Ronggang of China.

== Career statistics ==
Legend
GP	Games played	GS	Games started	MPG	Minutes per game
FG%	Field-goal percentage	3P%	3-point field-goal percentage	FT%	Free-throw percentage
RPG	Rebounds per game	APG	Assists per game	SPG	Steals per game
BPG	Blocks per game	PPG	Points per game	PIR	Performance index rating
**Bold**	Career high

=== NBA ===
==== Regular season ====
Year	Team	GP	GS	MPG	FG%	3P%	FT%	RPG	APG	SPG	BPG	PPG
2006–07	Atlanta	**81**	31	18.7	.455	**.500**	.764	5.4	.5	.6	.5	**5.5**
2007–08	Atlanta	36	0	11.5	.370	.000	.686	3.0	.3	.4	.4	3.0
2007–08	Sacramento	28	0	12.9	.491	.000	.667	3.5	.3	.3	.4	5.2
2008–09	Sacramento	30	0	10.2	.449	.000	.762	2.6	.3	.4	.3	.7
2008–09	Minnesota	15	0	13.8	.441	.000	.667	5.0	.3	.7	.5	4.9
2009–10	Boston	54	0	11.1	.521	.000	.765	2.7	.4	.2	.4	3.7
2010–11	Denver	42	32	17.0	.453	.000	.739	5.3	.5	.4	.5	4.7
2010–11	New York	17	6	11.6	**.538**	.000	**.828**	2.9	**.8**	.3	.2	3.9
2011–12	New Jersey	58	**35**	**22.0**	.478	.000	.731	**6.0**	.6	**.8**	**.7**	4.6
Career		361	104	15.5	.462	.222	.740	4.3	.5	.5	.5	4.5

==== Playoffs ====
Year	Team	GP	GS	MPG	FG%	3P%	FT%	RPG	APG	SPG	BPG	PPG
2010	Boston	8	0	7.1	.444	.000	.833	1.6	.0	.1	.0	1.6

=== Euroleague ===
Year	Team	GP	GS	MPG	FG%	3P%	FT%	RPG	APG	SPG	BPG	PPG	PIR
2012–13	Élan Chalon	10	10	23.0	.518	.000	.641	7.6	1.1	1.1	.7	11.3	14.8

== Personal life ==
On November 13, 2008, Williams married former University of Tennessee Lady Vols and Las Vegas Aces basketball star Candace Parker. They have a daughter named Lailaa. In November 2016, Williams filed for divorce claiming irreconcilable differences. They had been living separately for 3 months prior to the divorce. They share joint custody with neither paying child support to the other.

Shelden started the Shelden Williams Foundation in 2019. The Shelden Williams Foundation is dedicated to empowering student athletes and their families by delivering and supporting initiatives that promote emotional and physical health through sports, education, and community involvement.

== See also ==
- List of NCAA Division I men's basketball career blocks leaders
