= Andy Rautins =

American-born Canadian basketball player

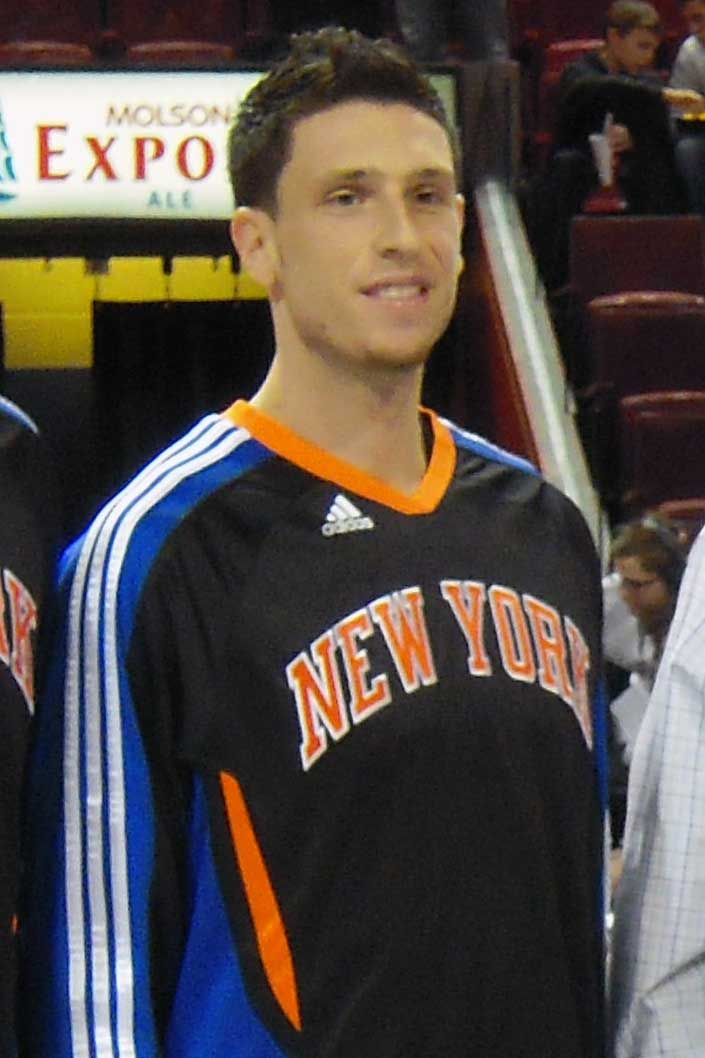
- Rautins with the New York Knicks in 2010

Ottawa Blackjacks
- Title: Assistant general manager
- League: CEBL

Personal information
- Born: November 2, 1986 (age 40) Syracuse, New York, U.S.
- Listed height: 6 ft 4 in (1.93 m)
- Listed weight: 190 lb (86 kg)

Career information
- High school: Jamesville-DeWitt (DeWitt, New York)
- College: Syracuse (2005–2010)
- NBA draft: 2010: 2nd round, 38th overall pick
- Drafted by: New York Knicks
- Playing career: 2010–2020, 2022
- Position: Shooting guard
- Number: 10, 11, 15, 8

Career history
- 2010–2011: New York Knicks
- 2011–2012: Lucentum Alicante
- 2012–2013: Tulsa 66ers
- 2013–2014: Skyliners Frankfurt
- 2014–2015: Varese
- 2015–2017: Gaziantep
- 2017–2018: Banvit
- 2018–2019: Bahçeşehir Koleji
- 2020: Panathinaikos
- 2022: AEK Athens

Career highlights
- Greek League champion (2020); NBA D-League Showcase Three-Point Shootout champion (2013)
- Stats at NBA.com
- Stats at Basketball Reference
Medals
Men's basketball
Representing Canada
FIBA U21 World Cup
Bronze medal – third place	2005 Mar del Plata	Under-21

Andrew Jay Rautins (born November 2, 1986) is an American-Canadian professional basketball executive and former player. He played college basketball for the Syracuse Orange and was drafted by the NBA's New York Knicks in 2010, with the eighth pick of the second round (38th overall).

He was born in Syracuse, New York, in the United States, but is also a Canadian citizen and has played for the Canadian national team. He is the son of Leo Rautins, who also played for Syracuse and professionally, and is the former coach of the Canadian national team.

== High school career ==
Rautins played on the 2004 Jamesville-Dewitt High School Class A state championship squad that went undefeated (29–0) after defeating St. Joseph's Collegiate Institute, 77–73 (OT) in the championship game. Rautins led the way with 19 points and seven rebounds. He was named first-team all-state and first-team All-CNY.

== College career ==
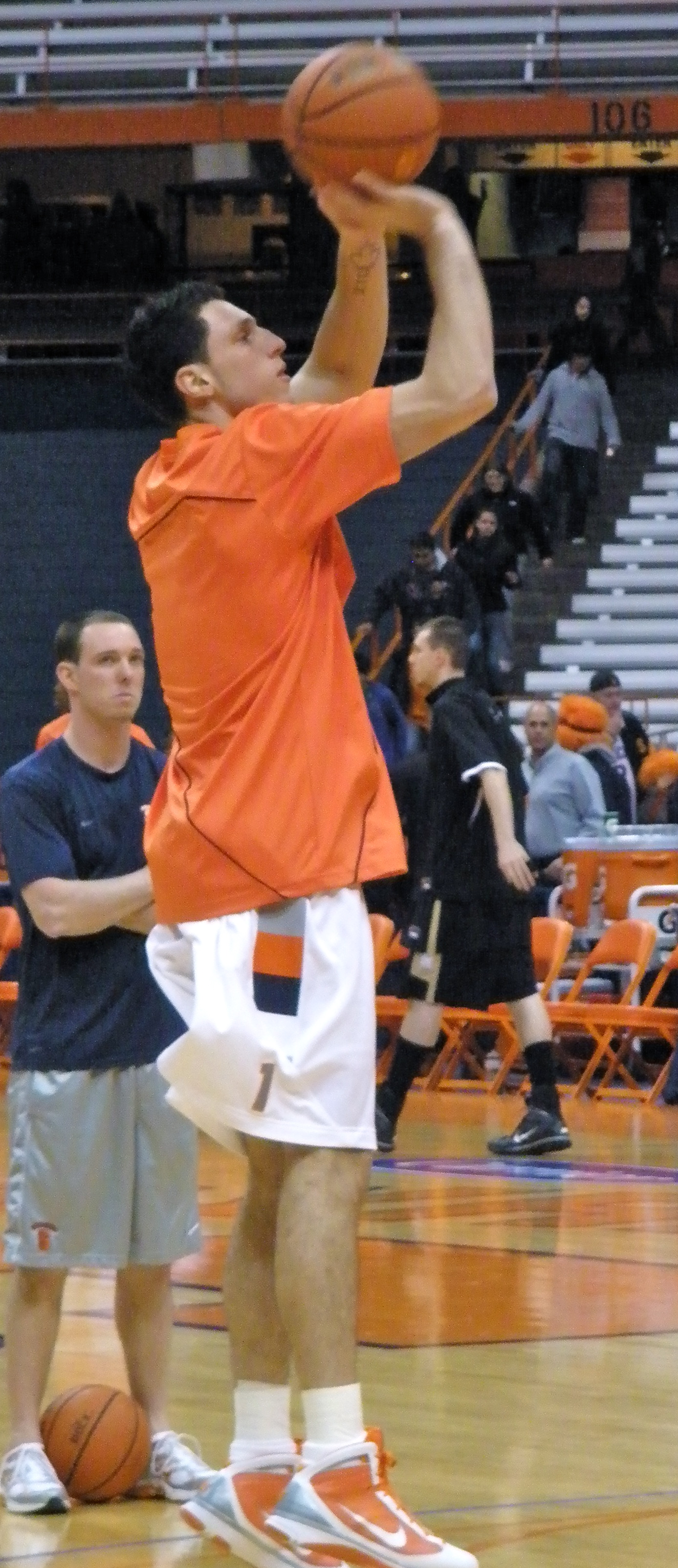
Rautins during warmups before a game at Syracuse University's Carrier Dome with Assistant Coach and former Syracuse Orange Basketball player Gerry McNamara watching.

Rautins had offers from Providence and St. Bonaventure before deciding on Syracuse. At Syracuse, he majored in communication and rhetorical studies.

=== 2005–06 ===
Rautins was used sparingly his freshman year, appearing in just 20 games. He averaged 2.9 points and 0.9 rebounds, but did set a then-career high of 10 points against South Florida on January 8, 2006, connecting on 3-of-5 3-point attempts.

=== 2006–07 ===
In his sophomore season, Rautins appeared in all 35 of Syracuse's games, including his first career start against Baylor on December 16, 2006. Rautins remained a fixture in the Syracuse starting lineup, and set a career high with 19 points against Providence on February 24, 2007. He finished the season averaging 7.2 points. Rautins established himself as one of the team's best perimeter shooters, converting 36 percent of his 3-point shots.

=== 2007–08 ===
Rautins missed the entire season because of a knee injury suffered during the Tournament of the Americas in Las Vegas over the 2007 summer. He was granted a medical redshirt.

=== 2008–09 ===
Rautins would return for his redshirt junior year after reconstructive surgery on his knee. His return paid immediate dividends for the Orange, as Rautins tied a school record with nine 3-pointers (Gerry McNamara had nine against BYU in the NCAA tournament in 2004) highlighting a career-high 29 points in an 82–71 victory over Coppin State on December 22, 2008.

Rautins would continue his tear against Seton Hall (26 points on 7–10 shooting from three point land), South Florida (14, 4–8) and DePaul (17, 5–10). In those four games, Rautins would hit a combined 25 3-pointers at a 57 percent clip. Other highlights included Rautins 20 points, and six 3-pointers in the epic six overtime game against Connecticut in the Big East tournament. Rautins played 50 minutes off the bench and made a crucial 3-pointer in the final seconds of the third overtime, forcing a fourth. Rautins also made the go-ahead 3-pointer in the sixth overtime, giving Syracuse their first lead since the end of regulation to help lead to the historic win.

=== 2009–10 ===
Rautins would become the full-time starter at shooting guard in his senior season. On November 20, 2009, Rautins would lead Syracuse to an 87–71 upset of then-No. 4 North Carolina with 11 points, seven rebounds, seven assists and seven steals. On December 10, 2009, Rautins played 39 minutes and scored 16 points and handed out five assists as Syracuse knocked off then-No. 10 Florida 85–73. On January 13, 2010, against Rutgers, Rautins scored 23 points and added 9 assists, 8 rebounds, and 5 steals in an 81–65 win.

Rautins finished the season averaging 12.1 points, 4.9 assists, 3.4 rebounds and 2.0 steals per game (leading the Big East), and was named to the All Big East Second Team and was also named an AP All American Honorable Mention.

== Professional career ==
Rautins was not seen as legitimate draft prospect not being featured on mock drafts and big boards. He was drafted as the 38th pick by the New York Knicks in the 2010 NBA draft, which was considered a surprising pick as Rautins was not projected even as top 90 prospect in the draft with the Knicks passing on New York native Lance Stephenson with plans to move up for Armon Johnson from Nevada. He signed a two-year non-guaranteed contract on August 12, 2010.

Rautins made his on-court NBA debut on November 9, 2010, in a game vs. the Milwaukee Bucks. He played 8 minutes, scoring 3 points and adding 1 assist during a 107–80 loss.

On December 10, 2011, Rautins was traded to the Dallas Mavericks as part of a three-way trade. He was waived by the Mavericks on December 15, 2011.

On December 21, 2011, Rautins signed a contract with CB Lucentum Alicante in Spain. On September 12, 2012, he joined the Oklahoma City Thunder. He was waived by the Thunder on October 27, 2012. He was then acquired by the Tulsa 66ers of the NBA D-League.

Rautins joined the Chicago Bulls for the 2013 NBA Summer League.

In September 2013, he signed with Skyliners Frankfurt of the Basketball Bundesliga for the 2013–14 season.

On August 23, 2014, Rautins signed a one-year deal with Pallacanestro Varese of the Italian Lega Basket Serie A.

On August 10, 2015, he signed with Gaziantep of the Turkish Basketball Super League (BSL) for the 2015–16 season.

On September 22, 2017, Rautins signed a training camp deal with the Toronto Raptors. He was waived by the Raptors on October 7.

After being waived from the Raptors, Rautins returned to Turkey and signed with Banvit on October 24, 2017. Rautins posted 9.9 points, 4.2 rebounds and 3.2 assists per game in the BCL. He joined Bahcesehir Basketbol on July 4, 2018.

On January 10, 2020, Rautins signed with Greek club Panathinaikos of the Greek Basket League and the EuroLeague.

On January 6, 2022, Rautins came out of retirement and signed with AEK Athens.

== National team career ==
Rautins made his international debut in the 2005 Jack Donohue International Classic averaging 18.3 minutes and 8.8 points. He started the gold medal game against Australia and scored a Canadian team tournament high 20 points including draining five three-pointers in the first half of the game. Rautins also played in the 2005 FIBA World U21 Championship in Argentina. He averaged 9.4 points in five games. In the bronze medal game, Rautins scored 11 points.

In 2006, Rautins played for the Canadian senior men's national team. The squad played a 10-game exhibition schedule in Europe during July and August. In a game against Venezuela at the International Alpos Cup, Rautins scored seven points and recorded three steals in 19 minutes. He also played in one game against Germany recording three points in eight minutes. Rautins played in all three games of the Diego Gianatti Tournament averaging 10.3 minutes and 2.3 points, including five points against Greece.

Rautins participated in the 2007 Pan American Games held in Rio de Janeiro, Brazil, averaging a squad-best 14.4 points and 2.4 assists. He scored 16 points in a preliminary loss to Brazil. During the same summer, he also played for Team Canada in the Tournament of Americas held in Las Vegas and tore his ACL during Canada's loss to Brazil.

Rautins was the second youngest player to be selected to the senior men's national team, and appeared in all three of the 2008 FIBA Olympic Qualifiers. He logged 13 minutes and three points in an 86–70 loss to Slovenia on July 15, six minutes in a 79–77 win over Korea on July 16, and eight minutes and four points in an 83–62 loss to Croatia on July 18. As a result of their 1–2 record, Canada did not qualify for the 2008 Olympics.

Rautins also played significant time in Team Canada's exhibition game against Team USA, the eventual gold-medal winner at the 2008 Beijing Olympics. Rautins spent all of his time exclusively at point guard during that game, logging 16 minutes.

Rautins was Team Canada's second leading scorer as the Canadians earned a fourth-place finish at the 2009 FIBA Americas Championship in Puerto Rico. Rautins averaged 9.5 points and 3.0 assists for the tournament, including a 23-point performance as Team Canada blew out Panama 97–65 in the quarterfinal on September 23. The team's finish was good enough to secure a spot in the 2010 FIBA World Championship in Turkey.

== NBA career statistics ==
Legend
GP	Games played	GS	Games started	MPG	Minutes per game
FG%	Field goal percentage	3P%	3-point field goal percentage	FT%	Free throw percentage
RPG	Rebounds per game	APG	Assists per game	SPG	Steals per game
BPG	Blocks per game	PPG	Points per game	**Bold**	Career high

=== Regular season ===
Year	Team	GP	GS	MPG	FG%	3P%	FT%	RPG	APG	SPG	BPG	PPG
2010–11	New York	5	0	4.8	.429	.250	.500	.2	.6	.2	.0	1.6
Career		5	0	4.8	.429	.250	.500	.2	.6	.2	.0	1.6

== See also ==
- 2010 NCAA Men's Basketball All-Americans
- List of second-generation National Basketball Association players
