= 2012 CBA Playoffs =

The 2012 CBA Playoffs is the postseason for the Chinese Basketball Association's 2011–12 season. The playoffs started on February 22, 2012, and ended on March 30, 2012. Beijing Ducks defeated Guangdong Southern Tigers to win their first CBA championship. It was broadcast on CCTV-5 and many local channels in China. Eight teams qualified for the playoffs, all seeded 1 to 8 in a tournament bracket, with first and second round in a best-of-five format, and a final in a best-of-seven format.

== Playoff qualifying ==
Seed	Team	Wins	Clinched Playoff berth	Fixed seed ranking
1	Guangdong Southern Tigers	27	January 19	February 5
2	Beijing Ducks	21	February 5	February 12
3	Shanxi Brave Dragons	20	February 10	February 15^{+}
4	Xinjiang Flying Tigers	19	February 12	February 15^{+}
5	Dongguan Leopards	19	February 8	February 15^{+}
6	Shanghai Sharks	18	February 10	February 15^{+}
7	Zhejiang Lions	18	February 10	February 15^{+}
8	Fujian Xunxing	17	February 10	February 15^{+}

- Note +: February 15 was the last matchday of regular season.

== Bracket ==
Teams in bold advanced to the next round. The numbers to the left of each team indicate the team's seeding in regular season, and the numbers to the right indicate the number of games the team won in that round. Home court advantage belongs to the team with the better regular season record; teams enjoying the home advantage are shown in italics.

Quarterfinals; Best of 5
1	**Guangdong Southern Tigers**	**3**
8	Fujian Xunxing	0
4	**Xinjiang Flying Tigers**	**3**
5	Dongguan Leopards	2
3	**Shanxi Brave Dragons**	**3**
6	Shanghai Sharks	1
2	**Beijing Ducks**	**3**
7	Zhejiang Lions	0

Semifinals; Best of 5
1	**Guangdong Southern Tigers**	**3**
4	Xinjiang Flying Tigers	0
3	Shanxi Brave Dragons	2
2	**Beijing Ducks**	**3**

Finals; Best of 7
1	Guangdong Southern Tigers	1
2	**Beijing Ducks**	**4**

== Match details ==
All times are in China standard time (UTC+8)

=== Quarterfinals ===
==== (1) Guangdong Southern Tigers vs. (8) Fujian Xunxing ====
FJTV

February 22
19:30

Report

Fujian Xunxing	97–**115**	**Guangdong Southern Tigers**
Scoring by quarter: 25-19, 13-35, 27-28, 32-33
Pts: Will McDonald 33; Rebs: Will McDonald 6 Asts: Zaid Abbas 9		Pts: Wang Shipeng 24; Rebs: James Singleton 12; Asts: Aaron Brooks 8

Zuchang Gymnasium, Jinjiang
Referees:
Ban Qi
Song Xiaojing
Hu Ji

GDTV

February 24
19:30

Report

**Guangdong Southern Tigers**	**116**–104	Fujian Xunxing
Scoring by quarter: 37-22, 22-26, 31-24, 26-32
Pts: Aaron Brooks 23; Rebs: James Singleton 9 Asts: 5 players 3		Pts: Will McDonald 24; Rebs: Will McDonald 17; Asts: Gong Songlin, Xie Yacai 3

Dongguan Arena, Dongguan
Referees:
Wu Minhua
Sun Weibing
He Luwei

GDTV

February 26
19:30

Report

**Guangdong Southern Tigers**	**137**–106	Fujian Xunxing
Scoring by quarter: 39-25, 26-42, 33-24, 39-15
Pts: Zhou Peng 31; Rebs: James Singleton 14; Asts: Aaron Brooks 7		Pts: Guo Lei 25; Rebs: Guo Lei, Will McDonald 8 Asts: Gong Songlin 7
**Guangdong win series, 3–0.**

Dongguan Arena, Dongguan
Referees:
Yu Bin
Yan Yudong
Yan Jun

Regular-season series

Teams were tied 1–1 in the regular-season series:

December 21, 2011

Report

**Fujian Xunxing**	**90**–85	Guangdong Southern Tigers

Zuchang Gymnasium, Jinjiang

February 8, 2012

Report

**Guangdong Southern Tigers**	**126**–116	Fujian Xunxing

Dongguan Arena, Dongguan

This was the first time Guangdong and Fujian had met in the CBA Playoffs.

==== (2) Beijing Ducks vs. (7) Zhejiang Lions ====
HZTV-5

February 22
19:30

Report

Zhejiang Lions	103–**106**	**Beijing Ducks**
Scoring by quarter: 25-29, 23-26, 22-31, 33-20
Pts: Peter John Ramos 26; Rebs: Peter John Ramos 20; Asts: Wang Zirui, Rodney White 4		Pts: Stephon Marbury 32; Rebs: Zhai Xiaochuan 10; Asts: Stephon Marbury 7

Hangzhou Gymnasium, Hangzhou
Referees:
Wang Mei
Yang Xiaoguang
Ning Rihui

BTV-6
CCTV-5

February 24
19:30

Report

**Beijing Ducks**	**104**–87	Zhejiang Lions
Scoring by quarter: 33-28, 27-15, 26-21, 18-23
Pts: Randolph Morris, Zhu Yanxi 20; Rebs: Zhai Xiaochuan 9 Asts: Stephon Marbury 7		Pts: Rodney White 23; Rebs: Rodney White, PJ Ramos 10; Asts: Lin Chih-chieh 4

Shougang Gymnasium, Beijing
Referees:
Xia Chun
He Jingzhou
Cui Zhexiong

BTV-6

February 26
19:30

Report

**Beijing Ducks**	**105**–91	Zhejiang Lions
Scoring by quarter: 24-13, 20-33, 36-20, 25-25
Pts: Randolph Morris 31; Rebs: Randolph Morris 11; Asts: 3 players 4		Pts: Rodney White 30; Rebs: Wang Bo 9 Asts: Lin Chih-chieh 4
**Beijing win series, 3–0.**

Shougang Gymnasium, Beijing
Referees:
Song Yanping
Wang Xiaochun
Jiang Tongbiao

Regular-season series

Zhejiang Lions won 2–0 in the regular-season series:

December 28, 2011

Report

Beijing Ducks	112–**118**	**Zhejiang Lions**

Shougang Gymnasium, Beijing

February 15, 2012

Report

**Zhejiang Lions**	**114**–94	Beijing Ducks

Hangzhou Gymnasium, Hangzhou

This was the first time Beijing and the Zhejiang Lions had met in the CBA Playoffs.

==== (3) Shanxi Brave Dragons vs. (6) Shanghai Sharks ====
G-Sports

February 22
20:00

Report

Shanghai Sharks	85–**90**	**Shanxi Brave Dragons**
Scoring by quarter: 27-25, 17-13, 12-31, 29-21
Pts: Mike Harris 22; Rebs: Mike Harris 14; Asts: Liu Wei 4		Pts: Marcus Williams 37; Rebs: Charles Gaines 19; Asts: Marcus Williams, Ren Junwei 3

Yuanshen Center, Shanghai
Referees:
Song Yanping
Liang Bin
Zhang Peng

SXTV

February 24
19:30

Report

**Shanxi Brave Dragons**	**99**–95	Shanghai Sharks
Scoring by quarter: 22-32, 30-17, 27-24, 20-22
Pts: Charles Gaines 31; Rebs: Charles Gaines 17; Asts: Lü Xiaoming 4		Pts: Marcus Landry 30; Rebs: Zhang Zhaoxu 13; Asts: Liu Wei 4

Binhe Stadium, Taiyuan
Referees:
Li Ping
Duan Zhu
Gao Xin

SXTV

February 26
19:30

Report

Shanxi Brave Dragons	99–**101**	**Shanghai Sharks**
Scoring by quarter: 25-28, 34-17, 24-32, 16-24
Pts: Duan Jiangpeng 36; Rebs: Charles Gaines 17; Asts: Lü Xiaoming 13		Pts: Marcus Landry 24; Rebs: Mike Harris 12; Asts: Tseng Wen-ting 4

Binhe Stadium, Taiyuan
Referees:
Liang Bin
Yang Hongfeng
Liu Jianhua

G-Sports
CCTV-5

February 29
19:30

Report

Shanghai Sharks	114–**121**	**Shanxi Brave Dragons**
Scoring by quarter: 28-27, 24-27, 33-31, 29-36
Pts: Liu Wei 23; Rebs: Zhang Zhaoxu 17; Asts: Liu Wei 4		Pts: Marcus Williams 35; Rebs: Charles Gaines 22; Asts: Marcus Williams 8
**Shanxi win series, 3–1.**

Yuanshen Center, Shanghai
Referees:
Song Yanping
Wang Mei
Song Xiaojing

Regular-season series

Teams were tied 1–1 in the regular-season series:

December 16, 2011

Report

**Shanghai Sharks**	**92**–90	Shanxi Brave Dragons

Yuanshen Center, Shanghai

February 3, 2012

Report

**Shanxi Brave Dragons**	**119**–108	Shanghai Sharks

Binhe Stadium, Taiyuan

This was the first time Shanxi and Shanghai had met in the CBA Playoffs.

==== (4) Xinjiang Flying Tigers vs. (5) Dongguan Leopards ====
EuroSoccer
CCTV-5

February 22
19:30

Report

**Dongguan Leopards**	**101**–95	Xinjiang Flying Tigers
Scoring by quarter: 29-21, 20-20, 27-24, 25-30
Pts: Ronald Randolph 30; Rebs: Ronald Randolph 14; Asts: Josh Akognon 9		Pts: Ike Diogu, Tim Pickett 19; Rebs: Mengke Bateer 11; Asts: Mengke Bateer 5

Dalang Arena, Dongguan
Referees:
Yang Maogong
Wen Keming
Ye Nan

XJTV

February 24
20:00

Report

**Xinjiang Flying Tigers**	**93**–82	Dongguan Leopards
Scoring by quarter: 23-13, 22-18, 25-25, 23-26
Pts: Ike Diogu 29; Rebs: Xiralijan Muhtar 13; Asts: Mengke Bateer 5		Pts: Josh Akognon 31; Rebs: Sun Tonglin 9 Asts: Zhang Kai 4

Hongshan Arena, Ürümqi
Referees:
Qiao Longsheng
Jiang Zhiyuan
Li Chengxin

XJTV

February 26
20:00

Report

**Xinjiang Flying Tigers**	**121**–115	Dongguan Leopards
Scoring by quarter: 30-26, 34-26, 20-26, 37-37
Pts: Ike Diogu 42; Rebs: Ike Diogu 12; Asts: Xiralijan Muhtar 5		Pts: Josh Akognon 42; Rebs: Ronald Randolph 12; Asts: Josh Akognon, Hung Chih-shan 4

Hongshan Arena, Ürümqi
Referees:
Yang Maogong
Wen Keming
Ye Nan

GDTV

February 29
19:30

Report

**Dongguan Leopards**	**111**–103	Xinjiang Flying Tigers
Scoring by quarter: 20-33, 22-19, 29-32, 40-19
Pts: Josh Akognon 39; Rebs: Zhang Kai, Li Muhao 7 Asts: Josh Akognon 7		Pts: Ike Diogu, Xiralijan Muhtar 29; Rebs: Mengke Bateer 9 Asts: Mengke Bateer 6

Dalang Arena, Dongguan
Referees:
Ban Qi
He Jingzhou
Jiang Zhiyuan

XJTV
CCTV-5

March 2
19:30

Report

**Xinjiang Flying Tigers**	**109**–88	Dongguan Leopards
Scoring by quarter: 24-17, 38-26, 23-27, 24-18
Pts: Tim Pickett 43; Rebs: Tim Pickett 15; Asts: Mengke Bateer 5		Pts: Josh Akognon 29; Rebs: Ronald Randolph 16; Asts: R. Randolph, He Zhongmian 2
**Xinjiang win series, 3–2.**

Hongshan Arena, Ürümqi
Referees:
Wu Minhua
Wen Keming
Wang Mei

Regular-season series

Teams were tied 1–1 in the regular-season series:

December 25, 2011

Report

**Dongguan Leopards**	**97**–90	Xinjiang Flying Tigers

Dalang Arena, Dongguan

February 12, 2012

Report

**Xinjiang Flying Tigers**	**97**–89	Dongguan Leopards

Hongshan Arena, Ürümqi

This was the first time Xinjiang and Dongguan had met in the CBA Playoffs.

=== Semifinals ===
==== (1) Guangdong Southern Tigers vs. (4) Xinjiang Flying Tigers ====
XJTV
CCTV-5

March 4
19:30

Report

Xinjiang Flying Tigers	92–**95**	**Guangdong Southern Tigers**
Scoring by quarter: 21-23, 24-29, 22-17, 25-26
Pts: Tim Pickett 24; Rebs: Tim Pickett, Mengke Bateer 10; Asts: Tim Pickett 6		Pts: Wang Shipeng 23; Rebs: James Singleton 16; Asts: Aaron Brooks, Wang Shipeng 4

Hongshan Arena, Ürümqi
Referees:
Foreign Referee
Wen Keming
Yang Hongfeng

GDTV

March 7
20:00

Report

**Guangdong Southern Tigers**	**97**–92	Xinjiang Flying Tigers
Scoring by quarter: 22-24, 22-18, 27-26, 26-24
Pts: Zhu Fangyu 25; Rebs: James Singleton 9 Asts: 3 players 4		Pts: Tim Pickett 17; Rebs: Ike Diogu 9 Asts: Tim Pickett 4

Dongguan Arena, Dongguan
Referees:
Foreign Referee
Foreign Referee
Song Xiaojing

GDTV
CCTV-5

March 9
19:30

Report

**Guangdong Southern Tigers**	**120**–102	Xinjiang Flying Tigers
Scoring by quarter: 26-15, 38-31, 24-25, 32-31
Pts: James Singleton 21; Rebs: James Singleton 16; Asts: Aaron Brooks 7		Pts: Xu Guochong 23; Rebs: Ike Diogu 10; Asts: Tim Pickett 3
**Guangdong win series, 3–0.**

Dongguan Arena, Dongguan
Referees:
Yu Bin
Foreign Referee
Zhang Peng

Regular-season series

Guangdong won 2–0 in the regular-season series:

December 23, 2011

Report

**Guangdong Southern Tigers**	**109**–92	Xinjiang Flying Tigers

Dongguan Arena, Dongguan

February 10, 2012

Report

Xinjiang Flying Tigers	106–**110** (OT)	**Guangdong Southern Tigers**

Hongshan Arena, Ürümqi

Last Playoffs meeting: 2011 CBA Finals (Guangdong won 4–2).

==== (2) Beijing Ducks vs. (3) Shanxi Brave Dragons ====
SXTV

March 4
19:30

Report

**Shanxi Brave Dragons**	**122**–119	Beijing Ducks
Scoring by quarter: 32-22, 23-31, 34-33, 33-33
Pts: Marcus Williams 40; Rebs: Charles Gaines 18; Asts: Marcus Williams, Lü Xiaoming 4		Pts: Stephon Marbury 42; Rebs: Randolph Morris 9 Asts: Lee Hsueh-lin 5

Binhe Stadium, Taiyuan
Referees:
Yang Maogong
Foreign Referee
Qiao Longsheng

BTV-6
CCTV-5

March 7
20:00

Report

**Beijing Ducks**	**132**–123	Shanxi Brave Dragons
Scoring by quarter: 40-30, 24-19, 43-35, 25-39
Pts: Stephon Marbury 52; Rebs: Randolph Morris 10; Asts: Stephon Marbury 10		Pts: Marcus Williams 45; Rebs: Charles Gaines 16; Asts: Lü Xiaoming 4

Shougang Gymnasium, Beijing
Referees:
Song Yanping
Foreign Referee
Jiang Zhiyuan

BTV-6

March 9
19:30

Report

**Beijing Ducks**	**128**–115	Shanxi Brave Dragons
Scoring by quarter: 35-20, 26-35, 29-33, 38-27
Pts: Stephon Marbury 53; Rebs: Lee Hsueh-lin 10; Asts: Lee Hsueh-lin 5		Pts: Charles Gaines 34; Rebs: Charles Gaines 23; Asts: Marcus Williams 3

Shougang Gymnasium, Beijing
Referees:
Foreign Referee
Ban Qi
Liang Bin

SXTV
CCTV-5

March 11
19:30

Report

**Shanxi Brave Dragons**	**102**–100	Beijing Ducks
Scoring by quarter: 28-26, 26-22, 30-32, 18-20
Pts: Marcus Williams 34; Rebs: Charles Gaines 16; Asts: Lü Xiaoming 9		Pts: Randolph Morris 36; Rebs: Randolph Morris 13; Asts: Randolph Morris 4

Binhe Stadium, Taiyuan
Referees:
Foreign Referee
Wu Minhua
Foreign Referee

BTV-6
CCTV-5

March 18
19:30

Report

**Beijing Ducks**	**110**–98	Shanxi Brave Dragons
Scoring by quarter: 29-13, 26-25, 29-27, 26-33
Pts: Stephon Marbury 30; Rebs: Ji Zhe, Randolph Morris 10; Asts: Stephon Marbury 8		Pts: Charles Gaines 30; Rebs: Charles Gaines 14; Asts: Marcus Williams 5
**Beijing win series, 3–2.**

Shougang Gymnasium, Beijing
Referees:
Foreign Referee
Foreign Referee
Qiao Longsheng

Regular-season series

Teams were tied 1–1 in the regular-season series:

December 4, 2011

Report

**Beijing Ducks**	**121**–97	Shanxi Brave Dragons

Shougang Gymnasium, Beijing

January 13, 2012

Report

**Shanxi Brave Dragons**	**114**–111	Beijing Ducks

Binhe Stadium, Taiyuan

This was the first time Beijing and Shanxi had met in the CBA Playoffs.

=== CBA Finals: (1) Guangdong Southern Tigers vs. (2) Beijing Ducks ===
BTV-6
CCTV-5

March 21
20:00

Report

**Beijing Ducks**	**108**–101	Guangdong Southern Tigers
Scoring by quarter: 37-22, 18-25, 33-24, 20-30
Pts: Stephon Marbury 36; Rebs: Lee Hsueh-lin, Ji Zhe 7 Asts: Stephon Marbury 5		Pts: Aaron Brooks 36; Rebs: James Singleton 16; Asts: 3 players 3

MasterCard Center, Beijing
Referees:
Foreign Referee
Wang Mei
Foreign Referee

GDTV
CCTV-5

March 23
19:45

Report

Guangdong Southern Tigers	106–**109**	**Beijing Ducks**
Scoring by quarter: 32-25, 24-25, 31-27, 19-32
Pts: Aaron Brooks 25; Rebs: James Singleton 15; Asts: Chen Jianghua 5		Pts: Randolph Morris 33; Rebs: Randolph Morris 12; Asts: Stephon Marbury 9

Dongguan Arena, Dongguan
Referees:
Foreign Referee
Xia Chun
Foreign Referee

GDTV
CCTV-5

March 25
19:45

Report

**Guangdong Southern Tigers**	**111**–93	Beijing Ducks
Scoring by quarter: 29-21, 20-25, 31-24, 31-23
Pts: Aaron Brooks 30; Rebs: James Singleton 19; Asts: Aaron Brooks 5		Pts: Stephon Marbury 39; Rebs: Randolph Morris 14; Asts: Stephon Marbury 3

Dongguan Arena, Dongguan
Referees:
Song Yanping
Foreign Referee
Foreign Referee

BTV-6
CCTV-5

March 28
19:45

Report

**Beijing Ducks**	**107**–98	Guangdong Southern Tigers
Scoring by quarter: 26-28, 22-16, 28-26, 31-28
Pts: Randolph Morris 32; Rebs: Randolph Morris 12; Asts: Stephon Marbury 7		Pts: Aaron Brooks 28; Rebs: James Singleton 11; Asts: Aaron Brooks 6

MasterCard Center, Beijing
Referees:
Foreign Referee
Wen Keming
Foreign Referee

BTV-6
CCTV-5

March 30
19:45

Report

**Beijing Ducks**	**124**–121	Guangdong Southern Tigers
Scoring by quarter: 25-36, 37-21, 32-36, 29-28
Pts: Stephon Marbury 41; Rebs: Randolph Morris, Ji Zhe 8 Asts: Stephon Marbury 7		Pts: Aaron Brooks 33; Rebs: Dong Hanlin 10; Asts: Aaron Brooks 5
**Beijing win CBA Finals, 4–1.**

MasterCard Center, Beijing
Referees:
Foreign Referee
Yang Maogong
Foreign Referee

Regular-season series

Teams were tied 1–1 in the regular-season series:

November 25, 2011

Report

Guangdong Southern Tigers	92–**104**	**Beijing Ducks**

Dongguan Arena, Dongguan

January 4, 2012

Report

Beijing Ducks	99–**112**	**Guangdong Southern Tigers**

Shougang Gymnasium, Beijing

Last Playoffs meeting: 2003 CBA Semifinals (Guangdong won 3–0).
