= Ji Zhe =

Chinese basketball player (1986–2019)

Ji Zhe 吉喆
Personal information
- Born: 14 October 1986; Shenyang, Liaoning, China
- Died: 5 December 2019 (aged 33); Beijing, China
- Listed height: 203 cm (6 ft 8 in)
- Listed weight: 100 kg (220 lb)

Career information
- College: Northeastern University
- Playing career: 2005–2018
- Position: Power forward
- Number: 51

Career history
- 2005–2007: Liaoning
- 2007–2018: Beijing Ducks

Career highlights and awards
- 3× CBA champion (2012, 2014, 2015); No.51 retired by the Beijing Ducks

Ji Zhe
- Chinese: 吉喆
Transcriptions
Standard Mandarin
- Hanyu Pinyin: Jí Zhé
- Wade–Giles: Chi Che
- IPA: [tɕǐ ʈʂɤ̌]

Ji Zhe (Chinese: 吉喆; 14 October 1986 – 5 December 2019) was a Chinese professional basketball player for the Beijing Ducks of the Chinese Basketball Association (CBA). Playing the position of power forward for the Ducks, he won three CBA championships and served as the team's captain. He died from lung cancer at the age of 33.

== Career ==
Ji Zhe was born 14 October 1986 in Shenyang, Liaoning, China. In 2005, he led the Northeastern University men's basketball team to win the 2nd Chinese University Basketball Super League championship. He was also a member of the Liaoning provincial team which finished 4th at the 2005 National Games of China.

In 2007, Liaoning loaned Ji to the Beijing Ducks of the Chinese Basketball Association (CBA). He permanently joined the Ducks in 2012. As a member of the Ducks, he won three CBA championships in 2012, 2014, and 2015. He played the position of power forward and served as the captain of the Ducks. He was listed at 2.03 metres (6 ft 8 in) tall and weighed 100 kilograms (220 lb).

Ji played his final game on 22 March 2018, the Ducks' last game of the 2017–2018 CBA season. During his CBA career he played 434 games, averaging 23.9 minutes, 7.3 points, and 4.7 rebounds per game. He was considered a good rim protector.

== Death ==
In August 2018, Ji was diagnosed with lung cancer, but did not publicly disclose the news and quietly sought treatment in the United States. Despite more than a year of treatment, his health deteriorated and he died on 5 December 2019 at the China-Japan Friendship Hospital in Beijing, aged 33. He had a son.

On 8 December 2019, the Ducks' played their first home game after Ji's death as a tribute to him, and all Ducks players wore his No. 51 jersey before the game. The team placed a T-shirt with the number 51 on each of the 18,000 seats inside the Wukesong Arena and retired the number. Many players and fans were in tears. The Ducks defeated the visiting Shenzhen Aviators by the score of 102 to 100, with Jeremy Lin scoring three free throws in the final seconds of the game. Lin called the comeback victory a "miracle".

== In popular culture ==
In the 2016 film My Other Home, a biopic of Ji's former Ducks teammate Stephon Marbury, the Taiwanese-Canadian actor Godfrey Gao portrayed the player based on Ji. By coincidence, Gao died suddenly at the age of 35, eight days before Ji's death.
