= Aaron Brooks (basketball) =

American basketball player (born 1985)

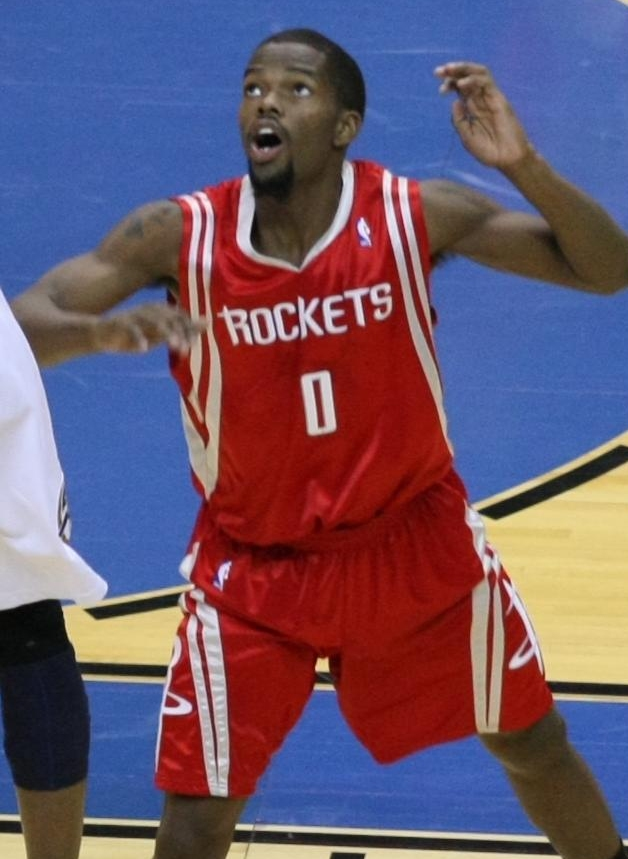
- Brooks with the Houston Rockets in 2008

Personal information
- Born: January 14, 1985 (age 41) Seattle, Washington, U.S.
- Listed height: 6 ft 0 in (1.83 m)
- Listed weight: 161 lb (73 kg)

Career information
- High school: Franklin (Seattle, Washington)
- College: Oregon (2003–2007)
- NBA draft: 2007: 1st round, 26th overall pick
- Drafted by: Houston Rockets
- Playing career: 2007–2019
- Position: Point guard
- Number: 0, 3, 00, 30
- Coaching career: 2020–present

Career history

Playing
- 2007–2011: Houston Rockets
- 2007: →Rio Grande Valley Vipers
- 2011: Phoenix Suns
- 2011–2012: Guangdong Southern Tigers
- 2012–2013: Sacramento Kings
- 2013–2014: Houston Rockets
- 2014: Denver Nuggets
- 2014–2016: Chicago Bulls
- 2016–2017: Indiana Pacers
- 2017–2018: Minnesota Timberwolves
- 2019: Illawarra Hawks

Coaching
- 2020–2023: New York Knicks (two-way liaison)
- 2021–2023: →Westchester Knicks (assistant)

Career highlights
- NBA Most Improved Player (2010); CBA All-Star (2012); Second-team All-American – SN (2007); Third-team All-American – AP (2007); First-team All-Pac-10 (2007); McDonald's All-American (2003); Third-team Parade All-American (2003); Washington Mr. Basketball (2003)

Career statistics
- Points: 6,259 (9.7 ppg)
- Rebounds: 1,079 (1.7 rpg)
- Assists: 1,925 (3.0 apg)
- Stats at NBA.com
- Stats at Basketball Reference
Medals
Men's basketball
Representing the United States
FIBA Americas U18 Championship
Bronze medal – third place	2002 Isla Margarita	National team

Aaron Jamal Brooks (born January 14, 1985) is an American professional basketball coach and former player. He was selected 26th overall in the 2007 NBA draft. Brooks won the NBA Most Improved Player Award for the 2009–10 season.

== High school career ==
Brooks, a high-profile recruit out of Franklin High School in Seattle, "earned just about every honor possible" while leading his team to the Washington 4A State Championship as a senior. As a high school senior he averaged 24.3 points, 7.0 assists, 3.3 rebounds and 2.3 steals per game. In that championship game, Brooks went head-to-head with future Gonzaga Bulldog and two-time NBA champion Adam Morrison. Brooks finished with 38 points in the 67–55 win. Morrison finished with 37 in the loss, but was still named Tournament MVP after matching the then four-game scoring title.

Considered a four-star recruit by 247Sports.com, Brooks was listed as the No. 4 point guard and the No. 30 player in the nation in 2003.

== College career ==
Brooks played his college career at the University of Oregon in 2007. He was a four-year starter for the Ducks, and finished his career with 13.1 points, 3.5 rebounds, and 4.1 assists per game. In his first year at Oregon, Brooks took over the starting point guard role previously occupied by guard Luke Ridnour, who went on to play in the NBA. Despite missing 10 games with a broken bone in his wrist, Brooks earned Pac-10 All-Freshman honors. Brooks was named honorable mention all-Pac-10 for his efforts as a sophomore, a season which included a 34-point effort against USC. After a disappointing junior year at Oregon culminating in a suspension during a game against Washington, Brooks rebounded to become one of the leading candidates for Pac-10 Player of the Year. He led the Ducks to a number of key victories, including game winners over then #1 ranked UCLA and then #10 Arizona in Tucson. Brooks scored a team high 31 points and grabbed 8 rebounds in an overtime road win against then top 25 ranked Washington State, helping to hand the Cougars their first home loss of the 2006–07 season. At the half-way mark of Pac-10 conference play, Brooks was averaging 19.1 points and 4.5 assists per game in leading Oregon to a top 10 ranking and a 19–2 overall record. The Ducks went on to finish and tie for third place in the Pac-10 conference, and won the Pac-10 Championship tournament following an impressive three-day run over Arizona, Cal and USC. Oregon advanced to the Midwest Regional Final where they lost to defending champion Florida. Brooks was announced as one of 22 finalists for the John R. Wooden Award, which is given to the top college basketball player in the nation. Brooks was one of 10 players named to the Wooden All-American Team, and he was also All-Pac-10 First Team. He won the men's three point shootout on March 29, 2007, to finish off his NCAA career, but lost the "battle of the sexes" to Katie Gearlds of Purdue University. He graduated from Oregon in 2007 with a degree in political science.

== Professional career ==
=== Houston Rockets (2007–2011) ===
On June 28, 2007, Brooks was taken 26th overall in the first round of the 2007 NBA draft by the Houston Rockets. During the 2007–08 season, he spent time with the Rio Grande Valley Vipers of the NBA Development League.

On February 19, 2009, Rafer Alston, the Rockets' starting point guard at the time, was traded to the Orlando Magic minutes before the trading deadline, making way for Brooks to become the starter. As a starter, he averaged around 14.0 points and 4.5 assists per game. On April 21, 2009, Brooks scored 11 points in 27 seconds in a first round 107–103 playoff loss to the Portland Trail Blazers, in which Brooks played a huge part in Houston's rally, scoring three 3-pointers and a fast break lay-up. While the Rockets lost that game, they were able to eliminate Portland in six games. Brooks scored a then career-high 34 points in Game 4 of the 2009 Western Conference semi-finals as the Rockets, without Yao Ming, defeated the Los Angeles Lakers to even the series at 2–2. However, the Lakers eventually won the series in 7 games as well as the championship.

On January 13, 2010, Brooks scored a new career high of 43 points in a triple overtime win against the Minnesota Timberwolves. On March 15, 2010, Brooks scored the game winning shot against the Denver Nuggets with 2.9 seconds left in the game. On March 17, 2010, Brooks shot 7–7 from behind the three arc against the Memphis Grizzlies, setting a new franchise record. On April 11, 2010, Brooks became only the sixth player in NBA history to make over 200 3-pointers and over 400 assists in a single season.

On April 23, 2010, he was named NBA Most Improved Player, averaging 19.6 points, 5.3 assists, and 2.6 rebounds per game.

On November 6, 2010, Brooks suffered a sprained ankle. He returned on December 19, 2010, in a 102–93 win over the Sacramento Kings, in which he came off the bench for 15 minutes and recorded 9 points (all 3-pointers). In his first start since return from his injury, on January 10, 2011, he tied his season-high 24 points, in a win over the Boston Celtics.

=== Phoenix Suns (2011) ===
On February 24, 2011, Brooks was traded to the Phoenix Suns for Goran Dragić and a first-round pick the team got from the Orlando Magic in an earlier trade.

=== Guangdong Southern Tigers (2011–2012) ===
During the 2011 NBA lockout, Brooks signed to play for the Guangdong Southern Tigers. On January 6, 2012, Brooks scored 40 points while playing 38 minutes off the bench as Guangdong defeated the Tianjin Ronggang 110–97. Brooks was 5 points shy of tying the Guangdong points scored record made by former player Du Feng. On February 16, 2012, Brooks was selected as the replacement starting point guard for the 2012 CBA All-Star game. The original starter, J.R. Smith, decided not to play for personal reasons. Brooks was also selected to participate for the CBA's Three-Point Shootout competition. In the three-point shootout, Brooks was one point shy from entering the final round of the competition. In the All-Star game, Brooks led all competitors with 9 assists, but his Northern All-Stars team lost to the Southern All-Stars, 122–112. On March 8, the NBA on TNT did a segment on Brooks' time in China with Guangdong. Brooks led the team in assists for each game leading up to the 2012 CBA Finals, where they lost to the Stephon Marbury-led Beijing Ducks.

=== Sacramento Kings (2012–2013) ===
After an absence from the NBA during the 2011–12 season, the Suns initially extended a qualifying offer to Brooks for the 2012–13 season, but would later withdraw the offer, thus making Brooks an unrestricted free agent. Three teams that expressed interest in him were the Dallas Mavericks, the Sacramento Kings, and Brooks' former team, the Houston Rockets. In July 2012, Brooks signed with the Sacramento Kings. He was waived by the Kings on March 1, 2013.

=== Return to Houston (2013–2014) ===
He later signed with the Rockets on March 5, 2013. On June 30, 2013, he was waived by the Rockets, but on July 19, 2013, he rejoined the team, reaching an agreement on a one-year minimum contract.

=== Denver Nuggets (2014) ===
On February 20, 2014, Brooks was traded to the Denver Nuggets in exchange for Jordan Hamilton.

=== Chicago Bulls (2014–2016) ===
On July 22, 2014, Brooks signed with the Chicago Bulls.

On July 14, 2015, Brooks re-signed with the Bulls.

=== Indiana Pacers (2016–2017) ===
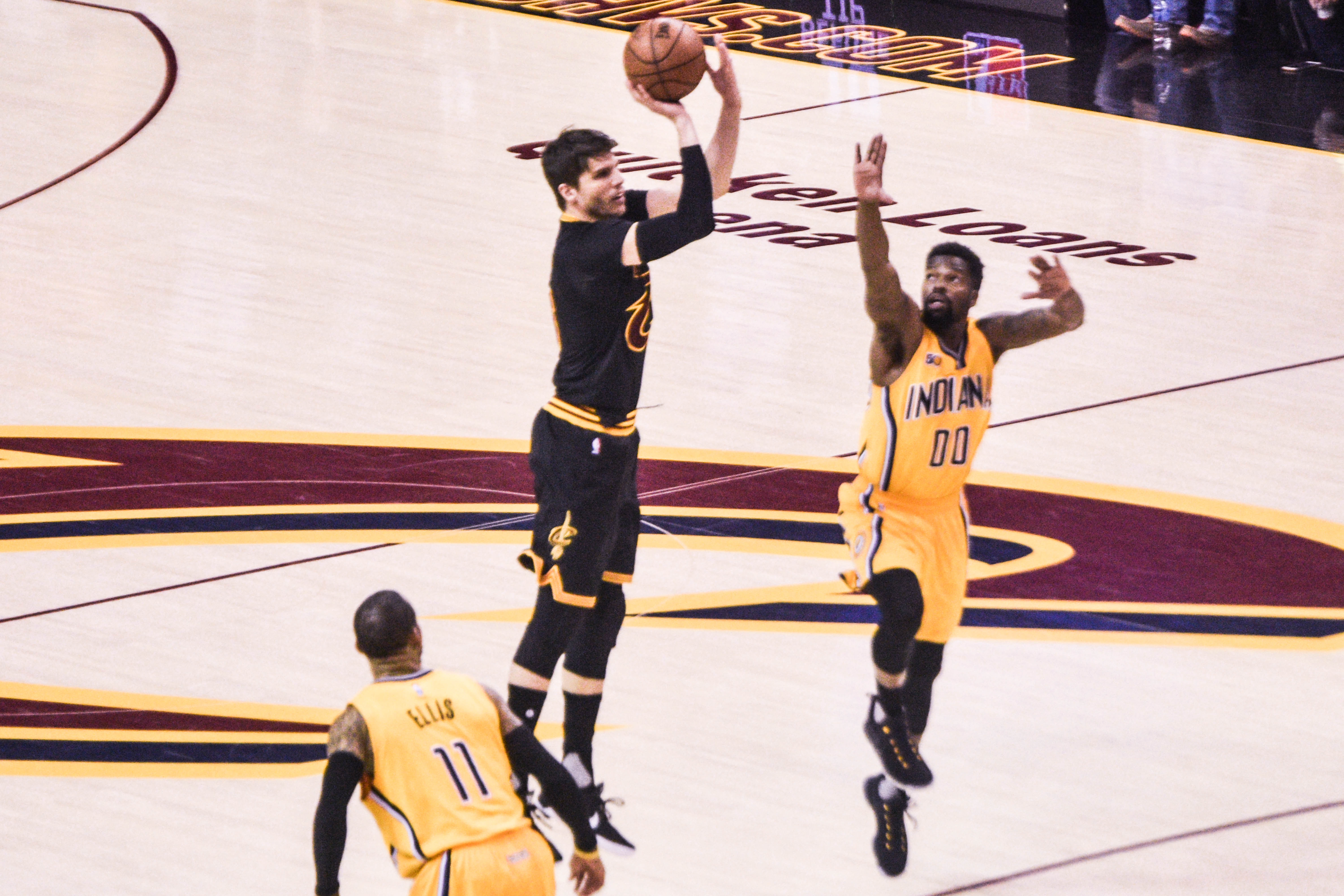
Brooks defends a shot by Kyle Korver during a 2017 game

On July 21, 2016, Brooks signed with the Indiana Pacers.

=== Minnesota Timberwolves (2017–2018) ===
On September 21, 2017, Brooks signed with the Minnesota Timberwolves.

=== Illawarra Hawks (2019) ===
On June 20, 2019, Brooks signed with the Illawarra Hawks in Australia for the 2019–20 NBL season. On October 28, 2019, he was ruled out for the rest of the season after tearing his left Achilles tendon in a game the previous day.

== Coaching career ==
On November 25, 2020, Brooks joined the New York Knicks as a two-way liaison. His primary role will be coaching Knicks players who are on two-way contracts. Brooks is serving under head coach Tom Thibodeau, whom he played for at stints in both Chicago and Minnesota.

== NBA career statistics ==
Legend
GP	Games played	GS	Games started	MPG	Minutes per game
FG%	Field goal percentage	3P%	3-point field goal percentage	FT%	Free throw percentage
RPG	Rebounds per game	APG	Assists per game	SPG	Steals per game
BPG	Blocks per game	PPG	Points per game	**Bold**	Career high
*	Led the league

=== Regular season ===
Year	Team	GP	GS	MPG	FG%	3P%	FT%	RPG	APG	SPG	BPG	PPG
2007–08	Houston	51	0	11.9	.413	.330	.857	1.1	1.7	.3	.1	5.2
2008–09	Houston	80	35	25.0	.404	.366	.866	2.0	3.0	.6	.1	11.2
2009–10	Houston	**82***	**82***	**35.6**	.432	.398	.822	2.6	**5.3**	.8	.2	**19.6**
2010–11	Houston	34	7	23.9	.346	.284	**.940**	1.5	3.8	.6	.1	11.6
2010–11	Phoenix	25	5	18.9	.430	.328	.807	1.1	4.2	.5	.0	9.6
2012–13	Sacramento	46	20	20.8	**.459**	.378	.769	1.7	2.3	.6	.2	8.0
2012–13	Houston	7	0	5.4	.308	.286	.000	.3	.9	.1	**.4**	1.4
2013–14	Houston	43	0	16.7	.395	**.409**	.841	1.4	1.9	.6	.1	7.0
2013–14	Denver	29	12	29.0	.406	.362	.902	**2.7**	5.2	**.9**	.2	11.9
2014–15	Chicago	**82**	21	23.0	.421	.387	.833	2.0	3.2	.7	.2	11.6
2015–16	Chicago	69	0	16.1	.401	.357	.766	1.5	2.6	.4	.1	7.1
2016–17	Indiana	65	0	13.8	.403	.375	.800	1.1	1.9	.4	.1	5.0
2017–18	Minnesota	32	1	5.9	.406	.355	.727	.5	.6	.2	.0	2.3
Career		645	183	20.8	.413	.370	.837	1.7	3.0	.6	.1	9.7

=== Playoffs ===
Year	Team	GP	GS	MPG	FG%	3P%	FT%	RPG	APG	SPG	BPG	PPG
2008	Houston	6	0	8.3	.320	.000	**.818**	1.0	.5	.0	.0	4.2
2009	Houston	**13**	**13**	**34.2**	.453	.422	.804	**2.6**	**3.4**	**.4**	**.2**	**16.8**
2013	Houston	6	0	11.2	.382	.111	.600	1.5	1.8	.2	**.2**	5.0
2015	Chicago	12	0	11.0	.344	.308	.571	1.5	.9	.3	.1	4.5
2017	Indiana	1	0	7.3	**.667**	**.500**	–	1.0	1.0	.0	.0	5.0
2018	Minnesota	2	0	1.5	**.667**	.000	.000	.0	.0	.0	.0	2.0
Career		40	13	17.6	.416	.330	.746	1.7	1.8	.2	.1	8.4

== Personal life ==
Brooks grew up in Seattle, Washington.
