= Randolph Morris =

American basketball player (born 1986)

Personal information
- Born: January 2, 1986 (age 40) Houston, Texas, U.S.
- Listed height: 6 ft 11 in (2.11 m)
- Listed weight: 275 lb (125 kg)

Career information
- High school: Landmark Christian (Fairburn, Georgia)
- College: Kentucky (2004–2007)
- NBA draft: 2005: undrafted
- Playing career: 2007–2019
- Position: Center / power forward
- Number: 5, 33

Career history
- 2007–2008: New York Knicks
- 2008–2010: Atlanta Hawks
- 2010–2018: Beijing Ducks
- 2019: Sporting Al Riyadi Beirut

Career highlights
- 3× CBA champion (2012, 2014, 2015); Lebanese Basketball League Champion (2019); CBA Finals MVP (2014); 2× CBA All-Star (2011, 2014); First-team All-SEC (2007); McDonald's All-American (2004); Third-team Parade All-American (2004)
- Stats at NBA.com
- Stats at Basketball Reference

Randolph Albert Morris (born January 2, 1986) is an American former professional basketball player.

== Early life ==
As a senior for Atlanta's Landmark Christian High School, Morris nearly averaged a triple-double at 23.0 ppg, 16.0 rpg and 8.0 bpg, which earned him McDonald's All-American Team status. Randolph Morris was the #2 rated center and #10 overall prospect by Rivals.com in a year when a record eight high schoolers went directly to the NBA draft. Morris strongly considered a jump straight to the NBA as well, but decided to spend at least a year in school. Kentucky won a late recruiting battle, after drawing Morris away from early favorite Georgia Tech. Morris, along with All-Americans Joe Crawford and Rajon Rondo, gave Kentucky the top-rated recruiting class in the nation. Also, in that same recruiting class was Kentucky teammate Ramel Bradley.

== College career ==
After a solid debut in his first year at Kentucky, Morris decided to declare for the 2005 NBA draft but did not hire an agent. He averaged 8.8 points per game and 4.2 rebounds. Despite playing well for Kentucky and starting every game but one, he did not prove himself NBA ready and often got in foul trouble. Morris went undrafted and decided to attempt a return to Kentucky. The NCAA agreed to reinstate him, but not before sitting out the first half of the 2005–2006 season. Morris returned to Kentucky in January 2006, but could not help the team get out of its season-long slump. Nevertheless, he improved in almost every statistical category from his freshman year and was very impressive at times. As a sophomore, he averaged 13.3 points and 6 rebounds per game. In his junior season, Morris made further progress, averaging 16.1 points, 7.8 rebounds and 2.1 blocks per game, earning first team All-SEC honors.

== Professional career ==
After his freshman year at Kentucky, Morris declared himself eligible for the 2005 NBA draft. He went undrafted, but since he did not hire an agent, Morris was allowed to return to the Wildcats to continue playing college basketball.

At the same time, because the NBA's collective bargaining agreement prohibited him from re-entering into a future draft, Morris was also legally a free agent who could be signed at any time. That meant he would be able to leave Kentucky in the middle of the college basketball season if signed by an NBA team.

Morris took advantage of his free agent status, and signed a two-year, $1.6 million contract with the New York Knicks on March 23, 2007, five days after Kentucky was eliminated from the NCAA tournament. Morris became the first player in history to go from the NCAA to the NBA in the same week, when he signed with the Knicks.

When UK's then head coach Tubby Smith resigned and took the same job with the Minnesota Golden Gophers, Kentucky's athletic director Mitch Barnhart asked Morris to defer making a decision about turning pro until after the administration found a new head coach to replace Smith, but he chose to sign with New York instead of waiting.

After spending parts of two seasons playing with the Knicks, Morris joined the NBA Summer League team of the Atlanta Hawks in 2008, and subsequently signed a two-year, $1.7 million contract with the Hawks on July 29. He would then spend the next two seasons as a member of Atlanta's roster.

Morris moved to the Beijing Ducks of the Chinese Basketball Association ahead of the 2010-11 season. In his second season in China, he and teammate Stephon Marbury led Beijing to its first-ever CBA title. In 2014, the Ducks won their second championship, and Morris was named the CBA Finals MVP. Beijing repeated as champions in 2015, giving the Ducks a run of three titles in four years.

== NBA career statistics ==
Legend
GP	Games played	GS	Games started	MPG	Minutes per game
FG%	Field goal percentage	3P%	3-point field goal percentage	FT%	Free throw percentage
RPG	Rebounds per game	APG	Assists per game	SPG	Steals per game
BPG	Blocks per game	PPG	Points per game	**Bold**	Career high

=== Regular season ===
Year	Team	GP	GS	MPG	FG%	3P%	FT%	RPG	APG	SPG	BPG	PPG
2006–07	New York	5	0	8.8	.167	.000	.333	1.8	**.2**	**.4**	**.2**	.8
2007–08	New York	18	**2**	**10.1**	.362	.000	.483	**2.1**	.1	.2	.1	**3.1**
2008–09	Atlanta	23	0	3.9	.412	.000	**1.000**	.9	.1	.1	.0	.8
2009–10	Atlanta	**28**	0	4.4	**.561**	.000	.593	1.4	.1	.2	.1	2.2
Career		74	2	5.9	.426	.000	.545	1.4	.1	.2	.1	1.9

=== Playoffs ===
Year	Team	GP	GS	MPG	FG%	3P%	FT%	RPG	APG	SPG	BPG	PPG
2009	Atlanta	**3**	0	2.7	.000	.000	.000	**.7**	.0	**.3**	.0	.0
2010	Atlanta	**3**	0	**3.3**	**.500**	.000	**1.000**	**.7**	.0	.0	.0	**1.0**
Career		6	0	3.0	.333	.000	1.000	.7	.0	.2	.0	.5
