= Emmanuel Mudiay =

American basketball player (born 1996)

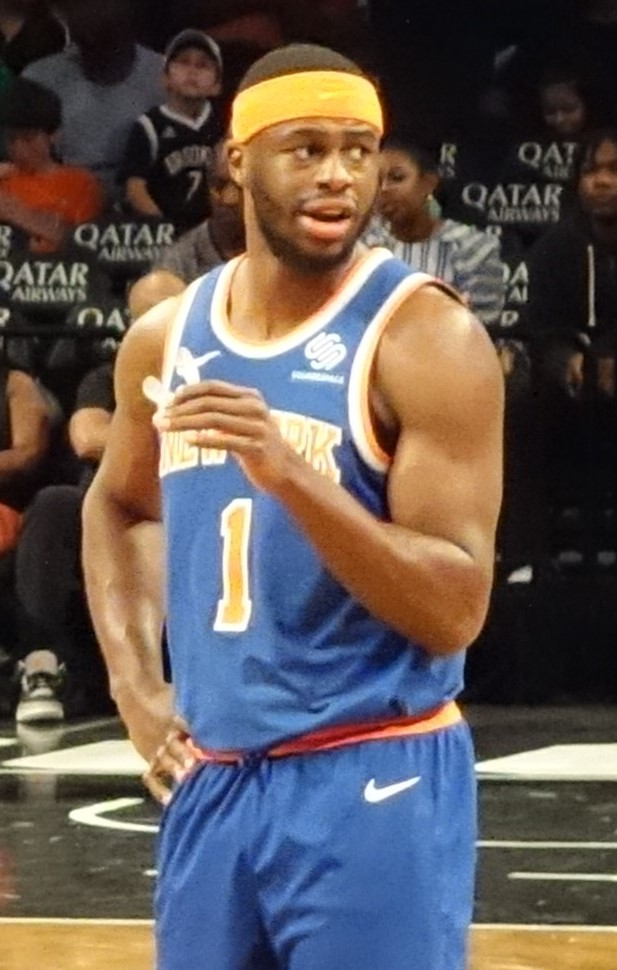
- Mudiay with the New York Knicks in 2018

No. 44 – Gigantes de Carolina
- Position: Point guard
- League: BSN

Personal information
- Born: March 5, 1996 (age 30) Kinshasa, Zaire (now DR Congo)
- Listed height: 6 ft 3 in (1.91 m)
- Listed weight: 200 lb (91 kg)

Career information
- High school: Grace Prep (Arlington, Texas); Prime Prep (Dallas, Texas)
- NBA draft: 2015: 1st round, 7th overall pick
- Drafted by: Denver Nuggets
- Playing career: 2014–present

Career history
- 2014–2015: Guangdong Southern Tigers
- 2015–2018: Denver Nuggets
- 2018–2019: New York Knicks
- 2019–2020: Utah Jazz
- 2021: Žalgiris Kaunas
- 2021–2022: Sacramento Kings
- 2022–2023: Iowa Wolves
- 2023: Cangrejeros de Santurce
- 2024–2026: Piratas de Quebradillas
- 2026-present: Gigantes de Carolina

Career highlights
- NBA All-Rookie Second Team (2016); BSN Most Valuable Player (2025); 2× BSN scoring champion (2024, 2025); McDonald's All-American (2014); First-team Parade All-American (2014)
- Stats at NBA.com
- Stats at Basketball Reference

Emmanuel Kabeya Mudiay (born March 5, 1996) is a Congolese-American professional basketball player for the Gigantes de Carolina of the Baloncesto Superior Nacional (BSN). He played high school basketball for Grace Preparatory Academy and Prime Prep Academy in Texas, where he received media attention. He committed to play for the SMU Mustangs men's basketball team on August 24, 2013, but later made the decision to forgo college and joined the Guangdong Southern Tigers in China. After an injury-riddled season in China, he was selected with the seventh overall pick in the 2015 NBA draft by the Denver Nuggets.

== Early life ==
Mudiay was born on March 5, 1996, in Kinshasa, Zaire (now the Democratic Republic of the Congo) to Jean-Paul Mudiay and Therese Kabeya. His father died when he was a toddler, and the family was tremendously troubled by the Second Congo War. He lived under the constant threat of the instability in the region, while his mother grew only enough coffee and vegetables to support their needs. In 2001, Kabeya and her sons sought asylum in the United States and eventually escaped. He primarily spoke French upon arriving in the United States, but his older brother said, "We felt like Americans."

== High school career ==
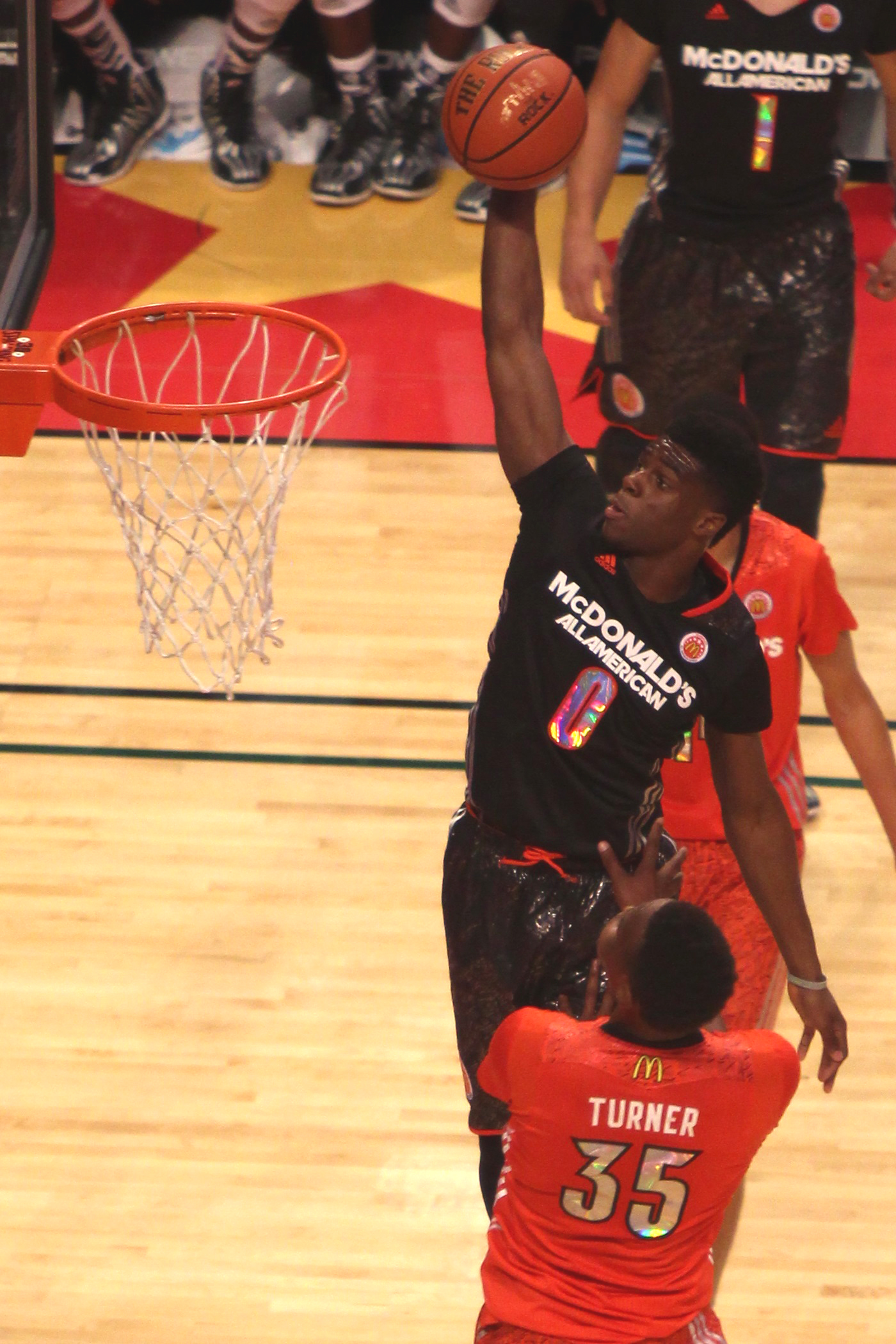
Mudiay at the 2014 McDonald's All-American Boys Game

In his freshman season, Mudiay attended Grace Preparatory Academy in Arlington, Texas, where he played alongside Isaiah Austin, who became an elite college center before being diagnosed with Marfan syndrome. Mudiay scored 16 points in the 2011 TAPPS Class 4A Final, helping the team defeat two-time champions Westbury Christian School with the score of 42–37.

Mudiay transferred to Prime Prep Academy in Dallas, Texas, with head coach Ray Forsett for his final seasons in high school. The program was put under scrutiny following the ineligibility of Karviar Sheperd and Jordan Mickey, two elite collegiate prospects. Upon excellent seasons with Prime Prep, however, Mudiay was rated the second-best recruit in his class by Rivals.com. He was also touted as a possible number one pick in the 2015 NBA draft.

He committed to play for the SMU Mustangs men's basketball team on August 24, 2013, because of the prospect of being coached by Larry Brown, who previously won an NBA title with the Detroit Pistons. Mudiay selected the school over other possibilities with the likes of Arizona, Baylor, Kansas, and Kentucky.

In the summer of 2014, Mudiay made the decision to forgo college and play overseas after considering playing in the Chinese Basketball Association. The move drew comparisons with Brandon Jennings, who made a similar choice.

== Professional career ==
=== Guangdong Southern Tigers (2014–2015) ===
On July 22, 2014, Mudiay signed a one-year, $1.2 million contract with the Guangdong Southern Tigers of the Chinese Basketball Association. On December 5, 2014, Will Bynum was signed by Guangdong as an injury replacement for Mudiay. Mudiay managed just 10 regular season games for Guangdong, only returning to action for the team on March 1, 2015, in Game 3 of their semi-final series against the Beijing Ducks. He played in Game 4 as well, but Guangdong lost the best-of-five series 3–1. In 12 total games (10 regular season and two playoff), Mudiay averaged 18.0 points, 6.3 rebounds, 5.9 assists, and 1.6 steals per game.

=== Denver Nuggets (2015–2018) ===
On June 25, 2015, Mudiay was selected by the Denver Nuggets with the seventh overall pick in the 2015 NBA draft. Mudiay played with the Nuggets in the 2015 NBA Summer League in Las Vegas, where he was named to the All-NBA Summer League second team. On July 31, he signed a 2-year, $6.3 million rookie scale contract with the Nuggets. He made his debut for the Nuggets in the team's season opener against the Houston Rockets on October 28, recording 17 points and nine assists in a 105–85 win. Mudiay started in all 23 games for the Nuggets to begin the season before a sprained right ankle suffered on December 11 ruled him out for 14 straight games. He returned to action on January 10 against the Charlotte Hornets, recording 11 points and six assists in a 95–92 win. On February 11, he was selected to replace injured defending champion Patrick Beverley in the NBA All-Star Weekend Skills Challenge. On March 10, he scored a career-high 30 points in a 116–98 win over the Phoenix Suns. On March 23, he recorded 27 points and 11 rebounds, and hit the game-winning 35-foot "rainbow" shot at the buzzer to give the Nuggets a 104–103 win over the Philadelphia 76ers. At the season's end, he earned NBA All-Rookie Second Team honors.

On November 6, 2016, Mudiay scored 24 of his career-high-tying 30 points in the first quarter of the Nuggets' 123–107 win over the Boston Celtics. On January 16, 2017, he had a career-high 13 assists in a 125–112 win over the Orlando Magic. Mudiay made 41 starts over the first half of the 2016–17 season before being moved to the bench in favor of Jameer Nelson.

=== New York Knicks (2018–2019) ===
On February 8, 2018, Mudiay was acquired by the New York Knicks in exchange for Devin Harris and a second-round pick, as part of a three-team trade with the Nuggets and the Dallas Mavericks. In his debut for the Knicks three days later, Mudiay had 14 points and 10 assists in a 121–113 loss to the Indiana Pacers.

Two days prior to the start of the 2018–19 season, Mudiay sprained his right ankle in practice; an injury which would sideline him for over two weeks. On December 14, he scored a career-high 34 points in a 126–124 overtime win over the Charlotte Hornets. On January 25, he was diagnosed with a left shoulder strain and was ruled out for at least two weeks. He returned from a 12-game absence on February 22 against the Minnesota Timberwolves. Mudiay missed the final two games of the season because of a sore left shoulder.

=== Utah Jazz (2019–2020) ===
On July 20, 2019, Mudiay signed with the Utah Jazz. In an interview shortly after signing with the Jazz, he was asked specifically why he chose to sign with the Jazz organization and he stated that he "can look at him [Mike Conley] like a big brother and he can mentor me" and "a lot of players that have come here have developed and gotten better and that's something that I wanted to do." He also stated he had never played in the playoffs and that's something that he wanted to do.

=== Žalgiris Kaunas (2021) ===
On August 23, 2021, Mudiay officially signed a one-year deal with Lithuanian club Žalgiris Kaunas of the EuroLeague.

On November 2, 2021, Mudiay and Žalgiris mutually parted ways. Mudiay averaged 7.4 points, 3.2 assists and 2.2 rebounds while shooting 32.5% from the field over 5 games with the club.

=== Sacramento Kings (2021–2022) ===
On December 22, 2021, Mudiay signed a 10-day contract with the Sacramento Kings.

=== Iowa Wolves (2022–2023) ===
On November 2, 2022, Mudiay was named to the opening night roster for the Iowa Wolves.

=== Cangrejeros de Santurce (2023) ===
On June 8, 2023, Mudiay signed with Cangrejeros de Santurce of the Puerto Rican league.

=== Piratas de Quebradillas (2024–2026) ===
On February 13, 2024, Mudiay signed with the Piratas de Quebradillas of the Baloncesto Superior Nacional.

On June 13, 2024, Mudiay was drafted by the Valley Suns in the 2024 NBA G League expansion draft.

On July 1, 2025, Mudiay was named the 2025 BSN Most Valuable Player.

=== Gigantes de Carolina (2026-present) ===
On September 23, 2026, Mudiay’s playing rights were traded from the Piratas de Quebradillas to the Gigantes de Carolina alongside a 2029 first-round draft pick in exchange for the rights to Scottie James. The move reunited Mudiay with his former head coach Juan Cardona and positioned him to play alongside Tremont Waters for the 2027 BSN season.

== National team career ==
During the 2016 off-season, Mudiay was part of the USA Men's Select Team, a team selected to train with the USA Basketball Men's National Team in preparation for the 2016 Rio Summer Olympics.

== Career statistics ==
Legend
GP	Games played	GS	Games started	MPG	Minutes per game
FG%	Field goal percentage	3P%	3-point field goal percentage	FT%	Free throw percentage
RPG	Rebounds per game	APG	Assists per game	SPG	Steals per game
BPG	Blocks per game	PPG	Points per game	**Bold**	Career high

=== NBA ===
==== Regular season ====
Year	Team	GP	GS	MPG	FG%	3P%	FT%	RPG	APG	SPG	BPG	PPG
2015–16	Denver	**68**	**66**	**30.4**	.364	.319	.670	**3.4**	**5.5**	**1.0**	**.5**	12.8
2016–17	Denver	55	41	25.6	.377	.316	.784	3.3	3.9	.7	.2	11.0
2017–18	Denver	42	0	17.9	.401	**.373**	**.808**	2.2	2.9	.5	.1	8.5
2017–18	New York	22	14	22.4	.368	.196	.686	2.6	3.9	.9	.3	8.8
2018–19	New York	59	42	27.2	.446	.329	.774	3.3	3.9	.7	.3	**15.0**
2019–20	Utah	54	2	15.7	**.462**	.345	.759	2.3	2.1	.4	.2	7.3
2021–22	Sacramento	2	0	5.5	.000	—	.750	.0	2.0	.5	.0	1.5
Career		302	165	23.8	.401	.323	.744	2.9	3.8	.7	.3	10.9

==== Playoffs ====
Year	Team	GP	GS	MPG	FG%	3P%	FT%	RPG	APG	SPG	BPG	PPG
2020	Utah	3	0	11.3	.357	.667	.500	2.0	.7	.0	.3	4.3
Career		3	0	11.3	.357	.667	.500	2.0	.7	.0	.3	4.3

=== EuroLeague ===
Year	Team	GP	GS	MPG	FG%	3P%	FT%	RPG	APG	SPG	BPG	PPG	PIR
2021–22	Žalgiris	5	4	19.1	.325	.231	.727	2.2	3.2	0.6	.0	7.4	5.6
Career		5	4	19.1	.325	.231	.727	2.2	3.2	0.6	.0	7.4	5.6

=== CBA ===
Year	Team	GP	GS	MPG	FG%	3P%	FT%	RPG	APG	SPG	BPG	PPG
2014–15	Guangdong	12	0	31.6	.478	.342	.574	6.3	5.9	1.6	.1	18.0
