= Market Information News =

Chinese newspaper

- Native name: 市场信息报
- Publisher: Market Information News Agency
- Founded: June 5, 1984
- Political alignment: Communism; Socialism with Chinese characteristics
- Language: Chinese
- Headquarters: Taiyuan, Shanxi
- OCLC number: 123259782
- Website: scxxb.com.cn

Market Information News (Chinese: 市场信息报), also known as Shichang Xinxibao or Market Information Paper, is a simplified Chinese newspaper published in the People's Republic of China. It is China's first newspaper dedicated to introducing economic information, and was called as "an information teller for promoting the development of socialist commodity production" (促进发展社会主义商品生产的信息员).

Market Information News was inaugurated in Taiyuan on 5 June 1984, co-sponsored and supervised by the Shanxi Finance and Trade Consulting and Research Centre (山西省财金贸易咨询研究中心) and the Shanxi Daily Agency (山西日报社). From March 1988 to May 2012, it was in charge of the Shanxi Federation of Supply and Marketing (山西省供销合作联合社). Currently, it is supervised by Shanxi Television.

== Controversies ==
Market Information News journalist Qian Chaofeng (钱超峰) falsified his academic credentials to receive a press card. This behavior was identified by the China's National Press and Publication Administration. In August 2019, the newspaper was administratively punished by the NPPA. In December, the paper was suspended from issuing press passes.
