= 2015 CBA Playoffs =

The 2015 CBA Playoffs was the postseason tournament of the Chinese Basketball Association's 2014-15 season.

== Bracket ==
Teams in bold advanced to the next round. The numbers to the left of each team indicate the team's seeding, and the numbers to the right indicate the number of games the team won in that round. Teams with home court advantage are shown in italics.

Quarterfinals; Best of 5
1	**Guangdong Southern Tigers**	**3**
8	Dongguan Leopards	1
4	**Beijing Ducks**	**3**
5	Jilin Northeast Tigers	0
2	**Liaoning Flying Leopards**	**3**
7	Zhejiang Lions	0
3	**Qingdao Eagles**	**3**
6	Shanxi Brave Dragons	0

Semifinals; Best of 5
1	Guangdong Southern Tigers	1
4	**Beijing Ducks**	**3**
2	**Liaoning Flying Leopards**	**3**
3	Qingdao Eagles	0

Finals; Best of 7
4	**Beijing Ducks**	**4**
2	Liaoning Flying Leopards	2

- **Bold** Series winner
- Italics Team with home-court advantage

== First round ==
All times are in China standard time (UTC+8)

=== (1) Guangdong Southern Tigers vs. (8) Dongguan Leopards ===
February 6
7:35 pm

Boxscore

Guangdong Southern Tigers 116, **Dongguan Leopards** **117**
Scoring by quarter: **32**-27, **32**-23, 30-**36**, 22-**31**
Pts: Will Bynum 30; Rebs: Jeff Adrien 18; Asts: Will Bynum 9	Pts: Ike Diogu 46; Rebs: Ike Diogu 13; Asts: Bobby Brown 9

Dalang Arena, Guangdong
Referees: Song Yanping, Jiang Zhiyuan, Cui Xiongzhe

February 8
7:35 pm

Boxscore

Dongguan Leopards 89, **Guangdong Southern Tigers** **112**
Scoring by quarter: 15-**28**, 23-**32**, **29**-27, 22-**25**
Pts: Bobby Brown 31; Rebs: Ike Diogu 9 Asts: Bobby Brown 2	Pts: Yi Jianlian 34; Rebs: Jeff Adrien, Yi Jianlian 11 each Asts: Will Bynum 11

Dongguan Basketball Center, Guangdong
Referees: Yan Yudong, Wang Xiaochun, Jiang Tongbiao

February 10
7:35 pm

Boxscore

Dongguan Leopards 97, **Guangdong Southern Tigers** **114**
Scoring by quarter: 24-**38**, **32**-21, 22-**23**, 19-**32**
Pts: Gu Quan 25; Rebs: Ike Diogu 7 Asts: Luo Hanchen 3	Pts: Yi Jianlian 28; Rebs: Yi Jianlian 12; Asts: Will Bynum 8

Dongguan Basketball Center, Guangdong

February 12
7:35 pm

Boxscore

**Guangdong Southern Tigers** **102**, Dongguan Leopards 89
Scoring by quarter: **29**-18, 24-**28**, **24**-21, **25**-22
Pts: Yi Jianlian 26; Rebs: Yi Jianlian 17; Asts: Will Bynum 5	Pts: Ike Diogu 28; Rebs: Ike Diogu 14; Asts: Bobby Brown 5
**Guangdong wins series 3–1**

Dalang Arena, Guangdong

=== (2) Liaoning Flying Leopards vs. (7) Zhejiang Lions ===
February 7
8:05 pm

Boxscore

**Liaoning Flying Leopards** **100**, Zhejiang Lions 92
Scoring by quarter: 23-23, 29-**35**, **26**-19, **22**-15
Pts: Deon Thompson 29; Rebs: Deon Thompson 14; Asts: Lester Hudson 7	Pts: Wang Zheng 18; Rebs: Eli Holman 16; Asts: Eli Holman 9

Hangzhou Gymnasium, Zhejiang
Referees: Xia Chun, Du Xiyuan, Yang Hongfeng

February 9
7:35 pm

Boxscore

Zhejiang Lions 105, **Liaoning Flying Leopards** **121**
Scoring by quarter: **28**-25, 17-**37**, **35**-32, 25-**27**
Pts: Eli Holman 29; Rebs: Eli Holman 15; Asts: Lin Chih-chieh, Zhao Dapeng 6 each	Pts: Han Dejun 36; Rebs: Han Dejun 8 Asts: Lester Hudson 10

Benxi Gymnasium, Liaoning
Referees: Wen Keming, Duan Zhu, He Jingzhou

February 11
7:30 pm

Boxscore

Zhejiang Lions 112, **Liaoning Flying Leopards** **120** (OT)
Scoring by quarter: 18-**26**, 22-**27**, **34**-30, **29**-20, Overtime: 9–**17**
Pts: Eli Holman 24; Rebs: Eli Holman 15; Asts: Zhao Dapeng 6	Pts: Lester Hudson 40; Rebs: Lester Hudson 15; Asts: Lester Hudson 13
**Liaoning wins series 3–0**

Benxi Gymnasium, Liaoning

=== (3) Qingdao Eagles vs. (6) Shanxi Brave Dragons ===
February 6
7:35 pm

Boxscore

**Qingdao Eagles** **115**, Shanxi Brave Dragons 113
Scoring by quarter: 23-**26**, 26-**46**, **30**-20, **36**-21
Pts: Mike Harris 42; Rebs: Hamed Haddadi 15; Asts: Hamed Haddadi 8	Pts: Von Wafer 37; Rebs: Jeremy Tyler 12; Asts: Von Wafer 7

Shanxi Sports Center, Shanxi
Referees: Qiao Longsheng, Wen Keming, Duan Zhu

February 9
7:35 pm

Boxscore

Shanxi Brave Dragons 101, **Qingdao Eagles** **118**
Scoring by quarter: 17-**25**, **38**-32, 22-**32**, 24-**29**
Pts: Von Wafer 38; Rebs: Jeremy Tyler 7 Asts: Zaid Abbas 2	Pts: Hamed Haddadi 39; Rebs: Hamed Haddadi 13; Asts: Justin Dentmon 5

Guoxin Gymnasium, Qingdao
Referees: Xia Chun, Du Xiyuan, Yang Xiaoguang

February 11
7:30 pm

Shanxi Brave Dragons 96, **Qingdao Eagles** **108**
Scoring by quarter: 25-**30**, 22-**37**, 20-**22**, **29**-19
Pts: Von Wafer 23; Rebs: Zaid Abbas 8 Asts: Von Wafer, Zaid Abbas, Luo Zhi 2 each	Pts: Mike Harris 22; Rebs: Mike Harris 17; Asts: Li Tao 5
**Qingdao wins series 3–0**

Guoxin Gymnasium, Qingdao

=== (4) Beijing Ducks vs. (5) Jilin Northeast Tigers ===
February 6
7:35 pm

Boxscore

**Beijing Ducks** **128**, Jilin Northeast Tigers 119
Scoring by quarter: 29-**33**, **40**-30, **27**-23, 32-**33**
Pts: Li Gen 28; Rebs: Randolph Morris 18; Asts: Stephon Marbury 13	Pts: Dominique Jones 40; Rebs: Zhong Cheng 14; Asts: Dominique Jones 15

Changchun Gymnasium, Jilin
Referees: Yang Maogong, Liang Bin, Song Xiaojing

February 8
7:35 pm

Boxscore

Jilin Northeast Tigers 92, **Beijing Ducks** **111**
Scoring by quarter: 24-**25**, 18-**34**, **30**-23, 20-**29**
Pts: Dominique Jones 32; Rebs: Zhong Cheng 10; Asts: Dominique Jones 10	Pts: Randolph Morris 31; Rebs: Randolph Morris, Zhu Yanxi 10 each Asts: Li Gen 6

MasterCard Center, Beijing
Referees: Ban Qi, Wang Mei, Yan Jun

February 10
7:35 pm

Boxscore

Jilin Northeast Tigers 95, **Beijing Ducks** **137**
Scoring by quarter: 28-**41**, 22-**31**, 21-**32**, 24-**33**
Pts: Dominique Jones, Denzel Bowles 22 each Rebs: Zhong Cheng 7 Asts: Dominique Jones 3	Pts: Li Gen 23; Rebs: Morris 14; Asts: Stephon Marbury 10
**Beijing wins series 3–0**

MasterCard Center, Beijing

== Semifinals ==
All times are in China standard time (UTC+8)

=== (1) Guangdong Southern Tigers vs. (4) Beijing Ducks ===
February 25
7:35 pm

Boxscore

Guangdong Southern Tigers 108, **Beijing Ducks** **114**
Scoring by quarter: 24-**34**, **35**-22, 23-**27**, 26-**31**
Pts: Yi Jianlian 36; Rebs: Yi Jianlian 16; Asts: Will Bynum 3	Pts: Li Gen 26; Rebs: Randolph Morris 9 Asts: Sun Yue 7
**Beijing leads series 1-0**

MasterCard Center, Beijing
Referees: Wang Junzhi, Wang Mei, Hu Ji

February 27
7:35 pm

Boxscore

**Beijing Ducks** **103**, Guangdong Southern Tigers 96
Scoring by quarter: **24**-18, **28**-25, 24-**29**, **27**-24
Pts: Li Gen 27; Rebs: Zhai Xiaochuan 10; Asts: Stephon Marbury 6	Pts: Will Bynum 32; Rebs: Yi Jianlian 17; Asts: Will Bynum, Zhu Fangyu 3 each
**Beijing leads series 2-0**

Dongguan Basketball Center, Guangdong

March 1
7:35 pm

Boxscore

Beijing Ducks 99, **Guangdong Southern Tigers** **110**
Scoring by quarter: 19-**26**, 19-**35**, **35**-28, **26**-21
Pts: Randolph Morris 27; Rebs: Randolph Morris 11; Asts: Stephon Marbury 9	Pts: Zhou Peng, Emmanuel Mudiay 24 each Rebs: Yi Jianlian 15; Asts: Will Bynum 9
**Beijing leads series 2-1**

Dongguan Basketball Center, Guangdong

March 3
7:35 pm

Boxscore

Guangdong Southern Tigers 105, **Beijing Ducks** **107** (OT)
Scoring by quarter: 22-**23**, 18-**28**, **26**-24, **30**-21, Overtime: 9-**11**
Pts: Yi Jianlian 31; Rebs: Yi Jianlian 24; Asts: Emmanuel Mudiay 8	Pts: Stephon Marbury 38; Rebs: Randolph Morris 15; Asts: Sun Yue, Stephon Marbury 3 each
**Beijing wins series, 3-1**

MasterCard Center, Beijing

Ducks center Zhu Yanxi tipped in Stephon Marbury's miss at the buzzer as the Beijing Ducks got the walk-off series victory. This series was considered a major upset and is often considered as one of the best in the CBA's history.

=== (2) Liaoning Flying Leopards vs. (3) Qingdao Eagles ===
February 26
7:35 pm

Boxscore

**Liaoning Flying Leopards** **106**, Qingdao Eagles 95
Scoring by quarter: 26-**32**, 23-**32**, **26**-17, **31**-14
Pts: Lester Hudson 39; Rebs: Han Dejun 10; Asts: Guo Ailun 7	Pts: Justin Dentmon 40; Rebs: Hamed Haddadi 9 Asts: Hamed Haddadi 5

Guoxin Gymnasium, Qingdao

February 28
7:35 pm

Boxscore

Qingdao Eagles 103, **Liaoning Flying Leopards** **112**
Scoring by quarter: 22-22, 25-**30**, 28-**30**, 28-**30**

Benxi Gymnasium, Liaoning

March 2
7:35 pm

Boxscore

Qingdao Eagles 110, **Liaoning Flying Leopards** **129**
Scoring by quarter: **29**-27, 27-**31**, 31-**37**, 23-**34**
**Liaoning wins series, 3-0**

Benxi Gymnasium, Liaoning

== Finals ==
All times are in China standard time (UTC+8)

=== (2) Liaoning Flying Leopards vs. (4) Beijing Ducks ===
March 10
7:35 pm

**Beijing Ducks** **103**, Liaoning Flying Leopards 84
Scoring by quarter: **24**-15, 19-**22**, **28**-22, **32**-25
Pts: Sun Yue 27; Rebs: Randolph Morris 14; Asts: Sun Yue 5	Pts: Lester Hudson 26; Rebs: Han Dejun 8 Asts: Guo Ailun 3

Benxi Gymnasium, Liaoning

March 12
7:35 pm

Beijing Ducks 94, **Liaoning Flying Leopards** **108**
Scoring by quarter: 19-**26**, **29**-28, **24**-16, 22-**38**
Pts: Randolph Morris 27; Rebs: Randolph Morris 10; Asts: Li Gen 3	Pts: Lester Hudson 41; Rebs: Deon Thompson 16; Asts: Lester Hudson 5

Benxi Gymnasium, Liaoning

March 15
7:35 pm

**Liaoning Flying Leopards** **109**, Beijing Ducks 108

MasterCard Center, Beijing

March 17
8:00 pm

Liaoning Flying Leopards 110, **Beijing Ducks** **111**

MasterCard Center, Beijing

March 19
7:35 pm

Liaoning Flying Leopards 93, **Beijing Ducks** **105**

MasterCard Center, Beijing

March 22
7:35 pm

**Beijing Ducks** **106**, Liaoning Flying Leopards 98
Scoring by quarter: 24-**25**, **29**-25, **26**-19, 27-**29**
Pts: Zhai Xiaochuan 27; Rebs: Zhu Yanxi 7 Asts: Stephon Marbury 7	Pts: Lester Hudson 27; Rebs: Han Dejun 12; Asts: Lester Hudson 7
**Beijing wins CBA Finals, 4-2**

Benxi Gymnasium, Liaoning
