= Dongguan Gymnasium =

Dongguan Gymnasium has been used to describe two different venues in Dongguan, Guangdong, China.

- Dongguan Arena (opened 1994)
- Dongfeng Nissan Cultural and Sports Centre also called Dongguan Basketball Center (opened 2014)
