= 2001 Summer Universiade =

Multi-sport event in Beijing, China

XXI Summer Universiade 第21届夏季大学生运动会
- Host city: Beijing, China
- Nations: 165
- Athletes: 6,657
- Events: 168 in 12 sports
- Opening: 22 August 2001
- Closing: 1 September 2001
- Opened by: Jiang Zemin
- Athlete's Oath: Wang Haibin (Fencing)
- Judge's Oath: Wen Fushen (Athletics)
- Torch lighter: Tian Liang
- Main venue: Workers' Stadium
- Website: universiade21.org.cn (archived)

The 2001 Summer Universiade, also known as the XXI Summer Universiade, was an international multi-sport event that took place in Beijing, China, between 22 August and 1 September. Beijing also hosted the 1990 Asian Games. A total of 6,757 athletes from 165 nations took part in 12 sports. The hosts, China, topped the medal table for the first time, with a total of 103 medals and 54 gold medals (more than twice the number of gold- medals won by the United States, in second place).

The event was also considered a rehearsal for the 2008 Beijing Olympics due to the announcement that Beijing would host the 2008 Olympic Games, which was made one month before the Opening Ceremony of the Universiade.

== Venues ==
=== Chaoyang District ===
- Beijing Workers' Stadium — ceremonies and football (men's finals)
- Olympic Sports Center Stadium — athletics
- Ying Tung Natatorium — swimming
- Olympic Sports Center Gymnasium - volleyball (finals)
- Sino-Japanese Youth Center pool - water polo
- Beijing Chaoyang Gymnasium - volleyball

=== Fengtai District ===
- Fengtai Sports Center - volleyball, football
- Guangcai Gymnasium - volleyball
- Beijing Tennis Center — tennis

=== Haidian District ===
- Haidian Stadium - football
- Peking University Haidian Gymnasium — table tennis
- Peking University Main Gymnasium - basketball
- Peking University May Fourth Stadium - football
- Peking University Swimming Pool- water polo
- Peking University Health Science Center Gymnasium- volleyball
- Tsinghua University Gymnasium - basketball
- Tsinghua University Stadium - football
- Tsinghua University Diving Pool - diving
- Beijing Sport University Gymnasium - basketball
- Beijing Sport University Stadium - football
- Capital Indoor Stadium — gymnastics (artistic and rhythmic)
- Beijing Jiaotong University Gymnasium - basketball
- Beijing Forestry University Gymnasium - basketball
- Minzu University of China Gymnasium - basketball
- Beihang University Gymnasium - volleyball
- Capital Normal University stadium - football

=== Xicheng District ===
- Beijing Yuetan Gymnasium - judo

=== Shijingshan District ===
- Shougang Gymnasium - fencing

=== Dongcheng District ===
- Xiannongtan Stadium- football

== Sports ==
Events in a total of twelve sports were contested at the Universiade.

- Note: Numbers in brackets denote the number of different events held in each sport.

=== Obligatory sports ===
Rhythmic gymnastics became an obligatory sport at this edition.

- Aquatics
  - Diving (12)
  - Swimming (40)
  - Water polo (1)
- Athletics (45)
- Basketball (2)
- Fencing (12)
- Football (2)
- Gymnastics (22)
  - Artistic gymnastics (14)
  - Rhythmic gymnastics (8)
- Tennis (5)
- Volleyball (2)

=== Optional ===
- Judo (18) ()
- Table tennis (7) ()

== Medal table ==
* Host nation (China)

Rank	Nation	Gold	Silver	Bronze	Total
1	China (CHN)*	54	25	24	103
2	United States (USA)	21	13	13	47
3	Japan (JPN)	14	14	25	53
4	Ukraine (UKR)	13	14	7	34
5	Russia (RUS)	12	18	22	52
6	Italy (ITA)	8	8	6	22
7	Cuba (CUB)	6	4	2	12
8	France (FRA)	5	2	15	22
9	Great Britain (GBR)	4	2	4	10
10	South Korea (KOR)	3	10	14	27
11	Poland (POL)	3	4	1	8
12	Romania (ROM)	3	4	0	7
13	Australia (AUS)	3	1	2	6
14	Brazil (BRA)	2	3	2	7
15	Spain (ESP)	2	3	1	6
16	North Korea (PRK)	2	1	8	11
17	Czech Republic (CZE)	1	4	8	13
18	Germany (GER)	1	4	2	7
19	Mexico (MEX)	1	3	0	4
20	Netherlands (NED)	1	2	3	6
21	Uzbekistan (UZB)	1	2	2	5
22	Israel (ISR)	1	1	0	2
22	Latvia (LAT)	1	1	0	2
24	Estonia (EST)	1	0	2	3
25	FR Yugoslavia (YUG)	1	0	1	2
25	Slovenia (SLO)	1	0	1	2
25	South Africa (RSA)	1	0	1	2
28	Kenya (KEN)	1	0	0	1
28	Morocco (MAR)	1	0	0	1
28	Turkey (TUR)	1	0	0	1
31	Belarus (BLR)	0	6	11	17
32	Chinese Taipei (TPE)	0	3	5	8
33	Kazakhstan (KAZ)	0	3	0	3
34	Belgium (BEL)	0	2	0	2
34	Canada (CAN)	0	2	0	2
34	Portugal (POR)	0	2	0	2
37	Switzerland (SUI)	0	1	6	7
38	Austria (AUT)	0	1	0	1
38	Azerbaijan (AZE)	0	1	0	1
38	Georgia (GEO)	0	1	0	1
38	Ireland (IRL)	0	1	0	1
38	Namibia (NAM)	0	1	0	1
43	Hungary (HUN)	0	0	6	6
44	Botswana (BOT)	0	0	2	2
45	Croatia (CRO)	0	0	1	1
45	Cyprus (CYP)	0	0	1	1
45	Egypt (EGY)	0	0	1	1
45	Slovakia (SVK)	0	0	1	1
45	Sweden (SWE)	0	0	1	1
45	Thailand (THA)	0	0	1	1
Totals (50 entries)		169	167	202	538
