= Starbury =

Basketball shoe brand

Starbury, Inc.
- Type: Private
- Industry: Clothing line
- Founded: 2006
- Headquarters: United States
- Key people: Stephon Marbury
- Products: Sneakers, apparel
- Website: https://www.starbury.com/ (dead)

"Starbury" is the nickname for former NBA all-star Stephon Marbury and the name of his clothing brand. The brand advertises itself as providing affordable athletic footwear. Marbury's influence extended to China, where he played in the Chinese Basketball Association. He also established the "Starbury Foundation" for charitable activities, emphasizing education and helping underprivileged children.

== Background ==
Marbury grew up in Brooklyn, New York City and was unable to afford the latest shoes. Having been inspired by a professor at Georgia Tech, Marbury wanted to offer high-quality, inexpensive shoes to future generations of kids and basketball players, so that they would not have his same dilemma. He took this idea to Steve & Barry's, popular for on-campus university and college focused retailing. Using earnings from the Knicks, they agreed to manufacture the shoes in China, and to market them, with a third party involved to prevent sweatshop conditions.

== Products ==
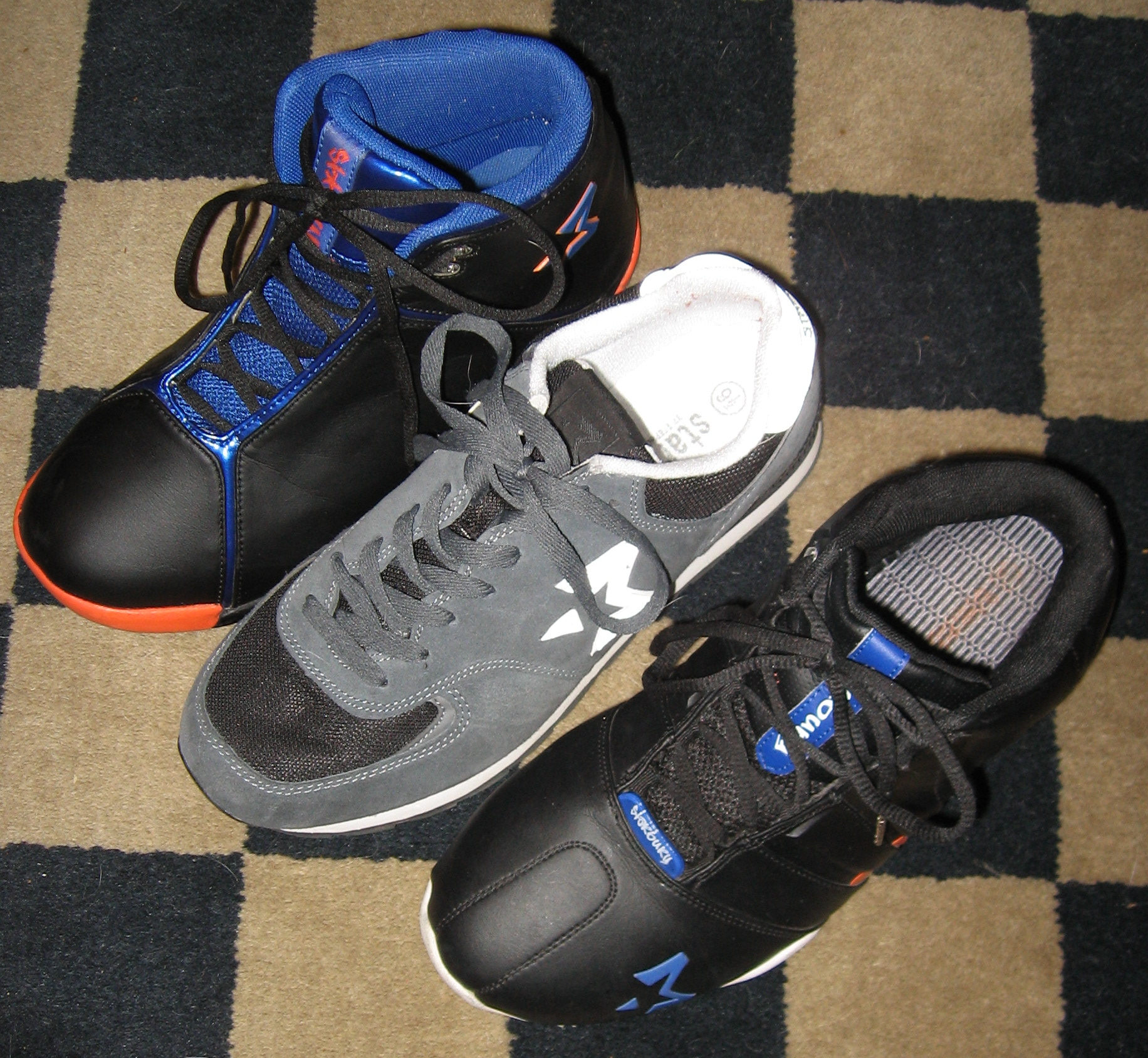
Three different styles of Starbury shoes.

During the clothing line's inception, Marbury went across the United States appearing at malls to do promotion. In addition, he was interviewed by Oprah Winfrey, Good Morning America, Good Day New York, Live with Regis and Kelly, Rachael Ray and many other national media outlets.

Marbury is the designer of an initial shoe lineup entitled "Starbury" includes "The Starbury One," a basketball shoe which Stephon wore all season on the New York Knicks, "Starbury Crossovers," a classic "Air Force One"-style shoe which is listed at US$9.98, "Starbury Cyclones," shoes with similar styling to "New Balance" shoes, also retailed at $9.98 USD, and finally the "Starbury SXM," another basketball shoe listed at $9.98. Not only does the "Starbury" brand feature shoes but it also sells low priced clothes. The initial lineup includes varsity jackets, hoodies, t-shirts, jerseys, track jackets and pants, dazzle pants, jeans, jean jackets, and warm-up outfits, all under $10.

In a March 2007 New York Times interview, Andy Todd, president of Steve & Barry's, revealed that the Starbury line would be expanding from 50 products to over 200 sometime that spring. The line would include the "Starbury Two" sneaker, polo shirts, skateboard shoes, and other lifestyle products; all under $15.

On April 1, 2007, Stephon Marbury released his second low-price NBA quality sneaker, the "Starbury Two". This shoe was also endorsed by former Detroit Pistons player Ben Wallace. Wallace now also has his own shoe, the "Big Ben", which came out on October 29, 2007, according to the Steve & Barry's website. The "Big Ben" also appeared in the music video The Rebirth by Christian hip hop artists Carriers Of the Cross. Other sneaker models which debuted on April 1 include a low-top version of the Starbury II, the "Starbury Team" (a high-top sneaker), the "Crossover LE" (the next incarnation of the low-top "Crossover") and has a "shiny" patent leather texture to it similar to Bape's "Bape-sta" sneaker, the "SXM Trainer"; the design is radically changed from the first "SXM" model, now a low-top cross-trainer made of nubuck material, the "Cyclone II" (sequel to the "Cyclone"), a nubuck jogging shoe, the "Bowery" (a low profile casual shoe), the "Surfside" (a nubuck skate shoe), and the "Tornado" (a running shoe).

New shoes include the SSE (Signature Special Edition), Danger, Marquis, Mirage, Downtown, Crib, Rush, Troy, and Trex.

== Initial reception ==
Despite Marbury putting up subpar numbers, in 2006–07, the shoes still sold well and even then-teammate Steve Francis had shown his support by wearing the sneakers in games. Some pairs have managed to sell for almost double the price on eBay auction listings. BusinessWeek named the line one of its best products of 2006. In November 2006, Stephon Marbury and Steve & Barry's announced Luis Da Silva, also known as Trikz, a streetball legend and "the world's best ball handler", would join Team Starbury as it hit the road on the Starbury SLAM tour. This tour would allow for Trikz to promote the Starbury movement by making appearances in Steve & Barry's locations and schools across 120 cities in 60 days to perform his unique style of hip-hop themed basketball wizardry in front of Starbury fans. While Trikz never played for an NBA team, Stephon Marbury entrusted him to weave the message of the importance of working hard and acting responsibly into his performances. Marbury believed Trikz embodies the values of the Starbury Movement, which Andy Todd, president of Steve & Barry's, said: "The Starbury Movement is more than then just about promoting a product line. It's about helping change the world for the better. Trikz is not only a phenomenal performer; he's also a phenomenal guy who kids will enjoy seeing and hearing." The Starbury Collection was the result of Marbury's vision to eliminate the incredible pressure kids and parents feel to spend top dollar on the latest kicks and threads.

== Findings on shoe quality ==
On March 23, 2007, Starbury was featured in a segment on the ABC show 20/20 (edition entitled "Enough!"), hosted by John Stossel. The segment dealt with the high price of sneakers and the role of Starbury and Marbury as an alternative. During the show, Marbury stated, "If you take my shoe and you take a $150 shoe, cut it down in half, and it is the same exact thing". Stossel put Marbury's statement to the test and a pair of Starbury Ones were brought to Professor Howard Davis, shoe design department professor at Parsons The New School for Design. Davis proceeded to cut apart the Starbury Ones and a pair of "$100 plus Air Jordans" and stated, "They're constructed the same way". Stossel then mentioned that "others in the business" came to the same conclusion.

Consumer Reports has tested the quality of the Starbury One and Starbury II. The Starbury One "earned decent marks in our earlier tests", according to Consumer Reports. As for the Starbury II, six of nine "men's summer basketball league" players hired by Consumer Reports to test the shoe stated "they would not buy the Starbury II for basketball--they said it provided less comfort, stability, or impact absorption than their favorite shoe". Consumer Reports concluded "our measurements showed that its heel cushioning is very good, its forefoot cushioning is good, and that it's very breathable and fairly flexible" and "The Starbury II would be a fine casual, everyday shoe."

== Discontinuation and reintroduction ==
Outlet Steve & Barry's closed in 2009 and the line was discontinued. In September 2015, Marbury announced via Instagram that the line would be reintroduced.
