= Zhang Yunsong =

Chinese basketball player (born 1977)

Zhang Yunsong 张云松
Personal information
- Born: 20 March 1977 (age 48); Beijing, China

Career information
- Playing career: 1995–2010

Career history
- 1995–2010: Beijing Ducks

Zhang Yunsong (born 20 March 1977) is a Chinese basketball player who competed in the 2004 Summer Olympics.
