= My Other Home =

- Poster
- Traditional Chinese: 我是馬布里
- Simplified Chinese: 我是马布里
- Literal meaning: I Am Marbury
- Directed by: Larry Yang
- Written by: Larry Yang
- Produced by: Huang Jianxin; Jeffrey Sharp
- Starring: Stephon Marbury; He Bing; Wu Chun; Godfrey Gao; Sunny Wang; Vivian Dawson; Jessica Jung
- Cinematography: Danny Chen
- Edited by: Super Zhang; Larry Yang
- Music by: Nicolas Errèra
- Production companies: Beijing Hairun Pictures; Beijing Forbidden City Pictures
- Release dates: 18 June 2017 (Shanghai International Film Festival); 4 August 2017 (China)
- Running time: 107 minutes
- Countries: China; United States
- Languages: Mandarin; English
- Box office: CN¥8.9 million

My Other Home, also known as Another Shot, is a 2017 Chinese-American sports biographical film directed by Larry Yang and produced by Huang Jianxin, starring American basketball player Stephon Marbury as himself, focusing on his days in China playing in the Chinese Basketball Association (CBA). The film is mainly based on Marbury's 2011–12 CBA championship run, when he and the Beijing Ducks bested seven-time champion Guangdong Southern Tigers and brought the city of Beijing its first ever CBA title.

Filming began on April 26, 2016 in Beijing's LeSports Center. The film was released in China on 4 August 2017.

Marbury won Best New Actor at the 14th China Movie Channel Media Awards. The film is generally well-received by viewers but flopped at the Chinese box office, with a domestic gross total of only ¥8.9 million.

== Plot ==
Stephon Marbury, after his fall from grace in the National Basketball Association and subsequent depression, rediscovers himself in the Chinese Basketball Association. He also tries to rebuild the Beijing Ducks' dynasty.

== Cast ==
- Stephon Marbury as himself
- Allen Iverson as Marbury's friend who was also drafted in the 1996 NBA draft, and also grew up in a poor neighborhood.
- Baron Davis as Corban Smith, import for the Guangdong team.
- Jessica Jung as Yang Chen, Marbury's manager/agent
- Wu Chun as Li Nan, Chinese scout that offered Marbury the Chinese contract and translated for both him and Yang Chen, as her Chinese is basic. He has to give up playing sports due to heart problems.
- Godfrey Gao as Yang Xiya (based on Ji Zhe), new power forward to the Beijing Team via free agency, but he has no interest in playing with the team.
- Sunny Wang as Wang Lielin, Captain of Guangdong team and also the translator for the coach.
- Gao Yunxiang as bar owner, he can talk about basketball, but can't play
- Vivian Dawson as Zhang Yi, Captain of Beijing Ducks
- He Bing as Zheng Alei, Head Coach of Beijing Ducks
- Frankie Faison as Marbury's father
- Loretta Devine as Marbury's mother
- Wang Qingxiang as Zheng Zhishang, father of Zheng Alei, and former championship-winning head coach of Beijing Team.
- Antwann Cosey as Richardson, another import for Beijing Ducks
- Andrew Manning as high school Marbury

== See also ==
- List of basketball films
