= Shougang Gymnasium =

Sports venue in Beijing, China

Coordinates: 39.9244°N 116.1933°E

- Shougang Basketball Center
- Interactive map of Shougang Gymnasium
- Full name: Shougang Gymnasium
- Location: Beijing, China
- Capacity: 6,000

Construction
- Opened: 2002

Tenant
- Beijing Ducks (CBA)

Shougang Gymnasium (Chinese: 首钢体育中心) is an indoor sporting arena located in Beijing, China. The capacity of the arena is 6,000 spectators and opened in 2002. It hosts indoor sporting events such as basketball and volleyball. It hosts the Beijing Ducks of the Chinese Basketball Association.
