= Ike Diogu =

Nigerian-American basketball player

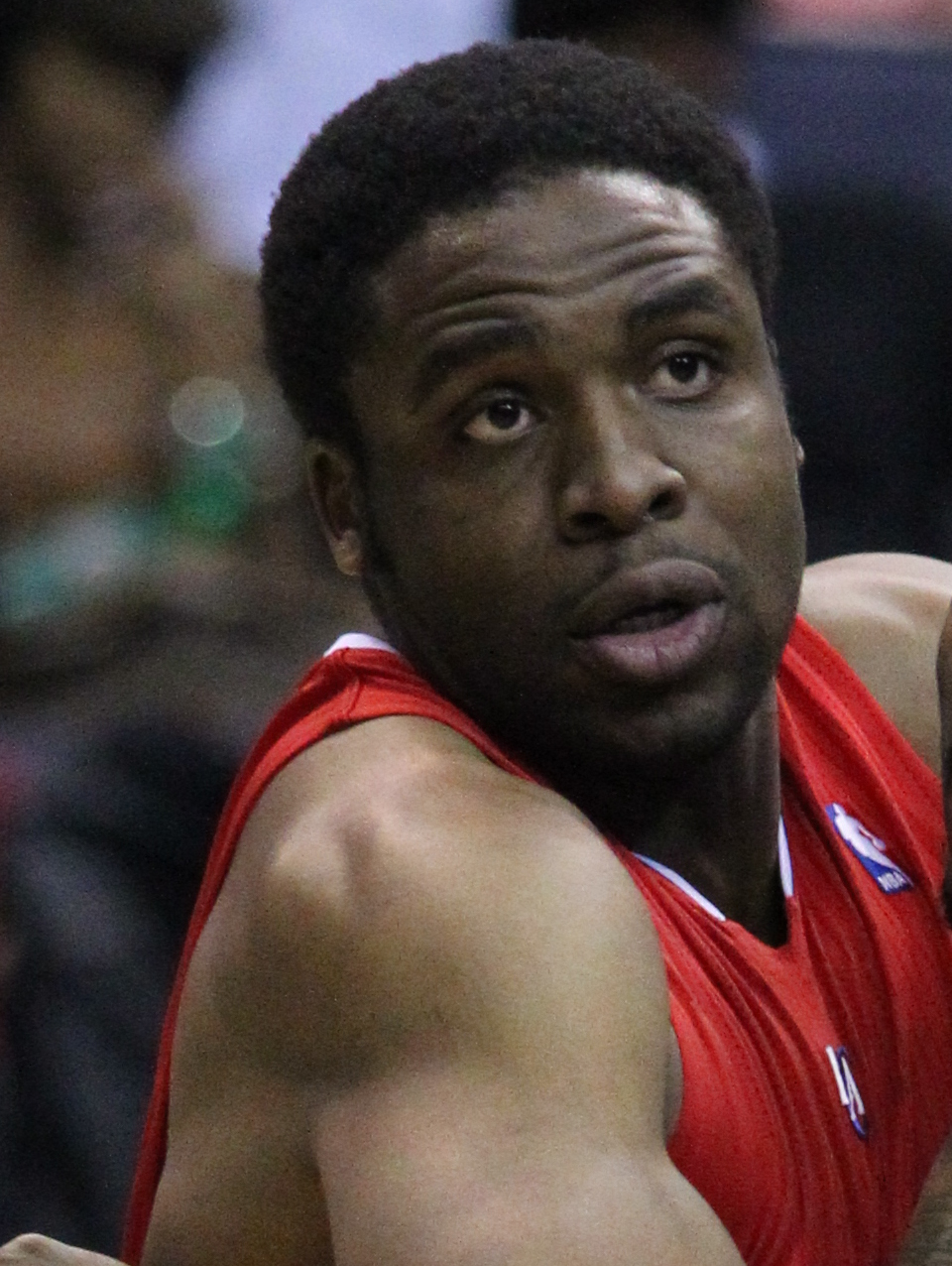
- Diogu with the Los Angeles Clippers in 2011

Personal information
- Born: September 11, 1983 (age 43) Buffalo, New York, U.S.
- Listed height: 6 ft 9 in (2.06 m)
- Listed weight: 250 lb (113 kg)

Career information
- High school: Garland (Garland, Texas)
- College: Arizona State (2002–2005)
- NBA draft: 2005: 1st round, 9th overall pick
- Drafted by: Golden State Warriors
- Playing career: 2005–2023
- Position: Power forward / center
- Number: 9, 3, 50, 1

Career history
- 2005–2007: Golden State Warriors
- 2007–2008: Indiana Pacers
- 2008–2009: Portland Trail Blazers
- 2009: Sacramento Kings
- 2010–2011: Los Angeles Clippers
- 2012: San Antonio Spurs
- 2012: Xinjiang Flying Tigers
- 2012: Capitanes de Arecibo
- 2012–2013: Guangdong Southern Tigers
- 2013: Leones de Ponce
- 2013–2014: Bakersfield Jam
- 2014: Leones de Ponce
- 2014–2015: Dongguan Leopards
- 2015–2016: Guangdong Southern Tigers
- 2016–2017: Jiangsu Monkey King
- 2018: Sichuan Blue Whales
- 2019: Shimane Susanoo Magic
- 2021: Chemidor
- 2021: Astros de Jalisco
- 2022–2023: Zamalek
- 2023: Piratas de La Guaira

Career highlights
- BSN champion (2014); BSN Center of the Year (2013); BSN First Team (2013); BSN All-Imports First Team (2013); NBA D-League Impact Player of the Year (2014); NBA D-League All-Star (2014); Consensus second-team All-American (2005); Pac-10 Player of the Year (2005); 3× First-team All-Pac-10 (2003–2005); No. 5 jersey retired by Arizona State Sun Devils; FIBA Africa Championship MVP (2017)
- Stats at NBA.com
- Stats at Basketball Reference
Medals
Men's basketball
Representing Nigeria
AfroBasket
Gold medal – first place	2015 Tunisia
Silver medal – second place	2017 Tunisia/Senegal

Ikechukwu Somtochukwu Diogu // (born September 11, 1983) is a Nigerian-American former professional basketball player who played six seasons in the National Basketball Association (NBA) and in multiple other leagues in his 18-year career. He was an All-American college player for the Arizona State Sun Devils.

== Family and early life ==
Diogu's parents, natives of Nigeria, moved to the U.S. in 1980 to pursue further education. They later moved from Buffalo, New York, where he was born in Garland, Texas. Ike attended Austin Academy, then enrolled at Garland High School. Diogu is a member of the Igbo ethnic group.

== College career ==
Diogu stands at 6 feet 9 inches (2.06 m) tall, which is considered slightly undersized for an NBA power forward, but he makes up for his lack of height with his muscle, girth and 7 feet 4 inches (2.24 m) wingspan.

Diogu attended Arizona State University, where he excelled on the team under head coach Rob Evans. He garnered several honors, both in the Pac-10 Conference and nationally. He won Pac-10 Freshman of the Year, and then Pac-10 Player of the Year in his final season with ASU, as a junior. Many speculated that Diogu would enter the draft after playing his third season with Arizona State. On June 21, 2005, he made the decision to enter the NBA draft.

On January 15, 2022, Diogu's number 5 jersey was retired by the Sun Devils. He was the first consensus All-American in program history.

== Professional career ==
Diogu was selected 9th overall in the first round of the 2005 NBA draft by the Golden State Warriors. On December 23, 2005, he recorded a professional career-best 27 points on 13–15 shooting, surpassing his previous best by 12 points. On January 17, 2007, Diogu, whom Larry Bird called the "gem" of the deal, was traded to the Indiana Pacers along with teammates Mike Dunleavy Jr., Troy Murphy, and Keith McLeod in exchange for Stephen Jackson, Al Harrington, Šarūnas Jasikevičius, and Josh Powell.

Following his time in Indiana, Diogu became an NBA journeyman. On June 26, 2008, he was traded to the Portland Trail Blazers on draft night. He was subsequently moved to the Sacramento Kings in February 2009 for Michael Ruffin. After brief stints signing with the New Orleans Hornets and Detroit Pistons, never appearing in a regular-season game for either, he signed with the Los Angeles Clippers as a free agent in December 2010. While with the Clippers, he scored a season-high 18 points against the Orlando Magic. He later had a one-week stint with the San Antonio Spurs in January 2012.

Diogu established a significant international career following his NBA tenure. He joined the Xinjiang Flying Tigers for the 2012 CBA Playoffs as a replacement for Gani Lawal, before signing with Capitanes de Arecibo in Puerto Rico. Although he attempted NBA comebacks with the Phoenix Suns and New York Knicks in 2012 and 2013 respectively, he found success in the NBA D-League with the Bakersfield Jam. His performance earned him a spot on the 2014 D-League All-Star roster and the Impact Player of the Year award. He returned to Puerto Rico in April 2014 to help Leones de Ponce win the league championship.

For several years, Diogu was a fixture in the Chinese Basketball Association. Between 2014 and 2018, he played for the Dongguan Leopards, returned to the Guangdong Southern Tigers, and replaced injured players for both the Jiangsu Monkey King and Sichuan Blue Whales. In the latter stages of his career, Diogu played globally, joining the Shimane Susanoo Magic in Japan (2019), Chemidor B.C. in Iran (2021), and Astros de Jalisco in Mexico (2021). In January 2022, he signed with Zamalek of the Egyptian Basketball Super League, making his debut in the 2022 FIBA Intercontinental Cup semifinal.

== National team career ==
Diogu has played with the senior men's Nigeria national basketball team. He has competed at two Summer Olympiads: the 2012 and 2016. He was named MVP of the 2017 FIBA Afrobasket tournament after averaging 22 points, 8.7 rebounds.

== NBA career statistics ==
Legend
GP	Games played	GS	Games started	MPG	Minutes per game
FG%	Field goal percentage	3P%	3-point field goal percentage	FT%	Free throw percentage
RPG	Rebounds per game	APG	Assists per game	SPG	Steals per game
BPG	Blocks per game	PPG	Points per game	**Bold**	Career high

=== Regular season ===
Year	Team	GP	GS	MPG	FG%	3P%	FT%	RPG	APG	SPG	BPG	PPG
2005–06	Golden State	**69**	**14**	**14.9**	.524	.000	.810	3.3	.4	**.2**	.4	7.0
2006–07	Golden State	17	0	13.1	.530	.000	.795	3.7	.3	**.2**	**.6**	7.2
2006–07	Indiana	42	2	12.8	.454	.000	.802	3.3	**.5**	.1	.4	5.8
2007–08	Indiana	30	1	10.2	.478	.000	.851	2.8	.3	**.2**	.1	5.6
2008–09	Portland	19	0	3.8	.316	.000	.750	.9	.0	.1	.1	1.4
2008–09	Sacramento	10	1	14.2	**.600**	**.500**	.758	**3.9**	.3	**.2**	.1	**9.2**
2010–11	L.A. Clippers	36	0	13.1	.561	.000	.661	3.2	.1	.1	.1	5.8
2011–12	San Antonio	2	0	7.0	.000	.000	**1.000**	.5	.0	.0	.0	1.0
Career		225	18	12.4	.509	.500	.786	3.1	.3	.2	.3	6.0

== See also ==
- History of Nigerian Americans in Dallas–Fort Worth
