= Zhai Xiaochuan =

Chinese basketball player

Zhai Xiaochuan 翟晓川
No. 20 – Beijing Ducks
- Position: Small forward
- League: Chinese Basketball Association

Personal information
- Born: March 24, 1993 (age 33) Tangshan, Hebei, China
- Listed height: 6 ft 8.5 in (2.04 m)

Career information
- Playing career: 2011–present

Career history
- 2011–present: Beijing Ducks
Medals
Men's basketball
Representing China
FIBA Asia Championship
Gold medal – first place	2015 Changsha
FIBA Asia Under-18 Championship
Gold medal – first place	2010 Yemen
FIBA Under-16 Asia Cup
Gold medal – first place	2009 Johor Bahru

Zhai Xiaochuan (Chinese: 翟晓川; born March 24, 1993) is a Chinese professional basketball player. He currently plays for the Beijing Ducks of the Chinese Basketball Association.

He represented China's national basketball team at the 2015 FIBA Asia Championship in Changsha, China. There, he recorded his team's best two point field goal percentage.
