= Shanxi Television =

Chinese television network

Shanxi Television (SXTV)
- Type: Broadcast
- Country: People's Republic of China
- Official website: http://www.sxrtv.com/

Shanxi Television (SXTV, simplified Chinese: 山西广播电视台; traditional Chinese: 山西廣播電視台; pinyin: Shānxī Guǎngbò Diànshì Tái) is a television network in the Taiyuan and Shanxi province. It was founded and started to broadcast in May 1960. SXTV currently broadcasts in Putonghua.
