= Dongguan Arena =

Sports venue in Dongguan, China

Coordinates: 23.0244°N 113.7481°E

- Interactive map of Dongguan Arena
- Full name: Dongguan Arena
- Location: Dongguan, Guangdong, China
- Capacity: 14,730

Construction
- Opened: 1994

Tenant
- Guangdong Southern Tigers (CBA)

Dongguan Arena is an indoor sporting arena located in Dongguan, Guangdong, China. The capacity of the arena, which opened in 1994, is 4,000 spectators. It hosts indoor sporting events such as basketball and volleyball and is home to the Guangdong Southern Tigers who play in the Chinese Basketball Association. The arena also hosted the weightlifting events during the 2010 Asian Games.

== See also ==
- 2010 Asian Games
- Chinese Basketball Association
- Dalang Arena
- Guangdong Southern Tigers
