= Beijing Ducks =

Professional basketball team in China

- League: CBA
- Founded: 1956; 70 years ago
- History: Beijing Basketball Team (1956–1988); Beijing Ducks (1988–present)
- Arena: Capital Indoor Stadium
- Capacity: 17,345
- Location: Beijing, China
- Team colors: Steel blue, Black, White
- Main sponsor: Shougang Steel (1988–2003); Wanfeng Aote (2003–2004); Jinyu Group (2004–2014); Shougang Steel (2011–present); BAIC Group (2023–2026)
- Head coach: Li Nan
- Championships: 3 (2012, 2014, 2015)
- Retired numbers: 3 (15, 51, 3)
Home	Away	Third

Beijing Ducks
- Chinese: 北京首钢鸭
Transcriptions
Standard Mandarin
- Hanyu Pinyin: Běijīng Shǒugāng Yā
- Wade–Giles: Pei^{3} ching^{1} Shou^{3}kang^{1} ya^{1}

The Beijing Shougang Ducks (simplified Chinese: 北京首钢霹雳鸭俱乐部篮球队), also known as Beijing Shougang or Beijing Ducks, officially named Beijing BAIC Basketball Club, are a professional basketball team based in Beijing, China, which plays in the North Division of the Chinese Basketball Association. The Shougang Corporation is the club's corporate sponsor while its mascot is a duck.

The team was formerly known as the Beijing Jinyu Ducks or Beijing Jinyu (北京金隅, běijīng jīnyü). The name change was due to a change in corporate sponsorship. This organization should not be confused with the Beijing Olympians, a different club, which was founded in 1955.

For at least part of the 2003–04 CBA season, the Ducks were known as Beijing Wanfeng Aote (北京万丰奥特). Their naming rights were then assumed by the "Beijing Jinyu Group Co., Ltd.", a prominent construction materials conglomerate in China.

== History ==
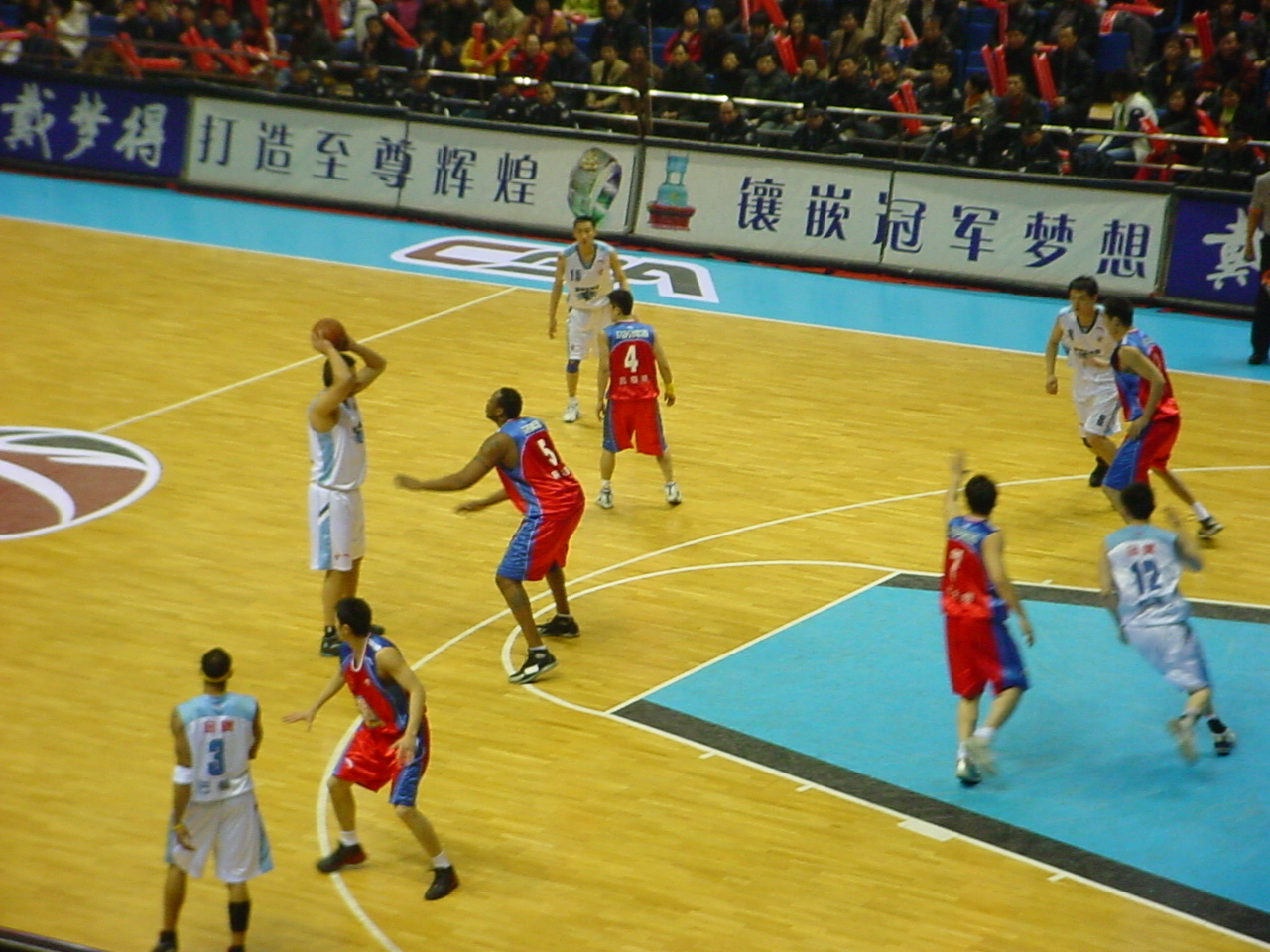
Beijing Ducks playing against Xinjiang Flying Tigers in the Shougang Basketball Centre, Shijingshan District, Beijing

The Beijing Ducks were initially formed as the Beijing Men's Basketball Team in 1956. In October of that same year, the National Basketball League's season was held in Chongqing. Beijing's club, with only 7 players registered on its roster, won the championship of that NBL edition. The team managed a third-place finish in the same competition when the tournament was held in Hangzhou in 1961.

In 1988, the club was first sponsored by the Shougang Corporation, and was renamed Beijing Shougang. When the duck was confirmed as the team's mascot in 1995, the club participated in the inaugural season of the Chinese Basketball Association as the Beijing Shougang Ducks Basketball Team. In October 1997, the Shougang Corporation moved to once again rebrand the club as the Beijing Shougang Basketball Team, in an ultimately fruitless attempt to give the corporate name greater popular precedence than the mascot.

The club had a formidable frontcourt duo in the early days of CBA competition with Mengke Bateer, who debuted for Beijing at the age of 18, and Shan Tao, who was considered to be one of the top Chinese centers at that time. The two helped the Ducks to a third-place finish in the team's CBA debut season.

During the 2004–05 CBA season, the Ducks finished in second place in the North Division, but lost in the Quarter-Finals of the CBA Playoffs to the South Division's Bayi Rockets. In 2008, the team visited the United States, training at Marquette University and the Milwaukee School of Engineering in Wisconsin, as well as visiting Philadelphia, Madison, Wisconsin, and Eugene, Oregon.

Beijing started the 2011–12 season with a 13-game winning streak, and eventually finished second in the regular season. The club then advanced to its first CBA Finals match-up, thanks largely to the play of former NBA All-Star Stephon Marbury. They won their first CBA title by defeating the Guangdong Southern Tigers 4 games to 1. The Ducks are the first-ever CBA team to earn the title without any previous trips to the CBA Finals, as well as the league's fourth different club to win a championship.

After being eliminated in the Semi-Finals of the 2013 CBA Playoffs, Beijing returned to the Finals at the end of the 2013–14 campaign and won their second trophy. The Ducks then repeated as champions in 2014–15, making it three titles in four years.

== Trophies ==
- Chinese Basketball Association

Champions (3): 2011–12, 2013–14, 2014–15

== Roster ==
Note: Flags indicate national team eligibility at FIBA-sanctioned events. Players may hold other non-FIBA nationalities not displayed.

Beijing Ducks roster
Players
Coaches

Pos.	No.	Nat.	Name	Ht.	Wt.	Age
PG	1	(Chinese Taipei)	Chen Ying-chun	1.82 m (6 ft 0 in)	86 kg (190 lb)	33 – 9 June 1993
G	4	(China)	Wang Kai	1.82 m (6 ft 0 in)	82 kg (181 lb)	19 – 4 July 2007
G	5	(United States)	Barry Brown Jr.	1.91 m (6 ft 3 in)	88 kg (194 lb)	29 – 21 December 1996
PF	7	(China)	Zeng Fanbo	2.07 m (6 ft 9 in)	93 kg (205 lb)	23 – 11 January 2003
G/F	9	(China)	Lei Meng	1.95 m (6 ft 5 in)	95 kg (209 lb)	31 – 4 August 1995
G	10	(China)	Zhao Rui	1.95 m (6 ft 5 in)	93 kg (205 lb)	30 – 14 January 1996
G	11	(China)	Sun Yahui	1.80 m (5 ft 11 in)	78 kg (172 lb)	22 – 7 January 2004
F	12	(China)	Fan Yiming	2.04 m (6 ft 8 in)	90 kg (198 lb)	25 – 20 October 2001
G/F	16	(China)	Zhang Cairen	1.96 m (6 ft 5 in)	98 kg (216 lb)	31 – 1 January 1995
F/C	17	(China)	Fan Ziming	2.11 m (6 ft 11 in)	116 kg (256 lb)	28 – 29 April 1998
PF	18	(China)	Lü Tianfu	2.06 m (6 ft 9 in)	101 kg (223 lb)	21 – 11 February 2005
C	19	(China)	Taruike Jianiyou	2.07 m (6 ft 9 in)	103 kg (227 lb)	28 – 17 March 1998
SF	20	(China)	Zhai Xiaochuan	2.04 m (6 ft 8 in)	110 kg (243 lb)	33 – 24 March 1993
F	22	(China)	Li Yonghan	2.04 m (6 ft 8 in)	100 kg (220 lb)	21 – 29 December 2004
PF	23	(Bahrain)	JaKarr Sampson	2.06 m (6 ft 9 in)	97 kg (214 lb)	33 – 20 March 1993
F	26	(China)	Zhang Zhixiao	2.07 m (6 ft 9 in)	87 kg (192 lb)	24 – 2 April 2002
C	27	(China)	Zhou Qi	2.16 m (7 ft 1 in)	113 kg (249 lb)	30 – 16 January 1996
F	28	(China)	Zhang Penghui	2.01 m (6 ft 7 in)	90 kg (198 lb)	21 – 17 March 2005
SG	43	(United States)	Lindy Waters III	1.96 m (6 ft 5 in)	95 kg (209 lb)	29 – 28 July 1997

Head coach

- (China) Li Nan

Assistant coach(es)

- (Latvia) Igors Miglinieks
- (China) Liu Peng
- (Turkey) Mert Özmutlu

Legend

- (C) Team captain
- Injured

- Roster

== Notable players ==
- Set a club record or won an individual award as a professional player.
- Played at least one official international match for his senior national team at any time.

- (China) Mengke Bateer (1997–2002, 2005–2006)
- (China) Zhang Yunsong (1998–2010)
- (United States) Chris Herren (2002–2003)
- (Nigeria) Olumide Oyedeji (2004)
- (China) Ji Zhe (2007–2018)
- (United States) David Harrison (2008–2009)
- (United States) Dontae' Jones (2008–2009)
- (China) Fang Shuo (2008–2026)
- (United States) Cedric Bozeman (2009–2010)
- (China) Sun Mingming (2009–2014)
- (United States) Ernest Brown (2010)
- (United States) Steve Francis (2010)
- (United States) Joe Crawford (2010–2011)
- (Chinese Taipei) Lee Hsueh-lin (2010–2014)
- (United States) Randolph Morris (2010–2018)
- (United States) Stephon Marbury (2011–2017)
- (China) Sun Yue (2013–2017)
- (China) Zhai Xiaochuan (2011–present)
- (China) Li Gen (2012–2015)
- (United States) Damien Wilkins (2013–2014)
- (China) Zhang Qingpeng (2014–2017)
- (United States) Grant Jerrett (2016–2017)
- (United States) Aaron Jackson (2017–2019)
- (Croatia) (United States) Justin Hamilton (2017–2021)
- (United States) Marcus Thornton (2018)
- (United States) Jeremy Lin (2019–2020, 2021-2022)
- (Nigeria) (United States) Ekpe Udoh (2019–2020)
- (United States) Jordan McRae (2020–2021)
- (United States) Jonathan Gibson (2020–2023)
- (United States) Nick Johnson (2022–2023)
- (South Sudan) (United States) Nuni Omot(2024–2025)

== Head coaches ==
- (Greece) Yannis Christopoulos: (2017–2020, 2021–2022)
- (Greece) Charis Markopoulos: (assistant, 2017–2022)

== See also ==
- My Other Home, a 2017 film starring Stephon Marbury, based on Beijing Ducks' 2011–12 CBA championship run
