= Stephon Marbury =

American basketball player (born 1977)

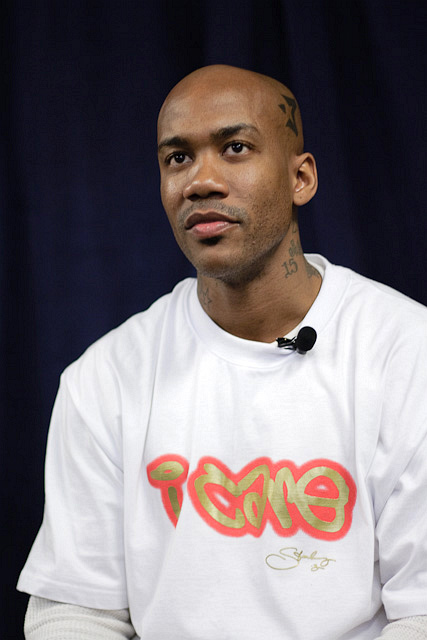
- Marbury in 2009

Personal information
- Born: February 20, 1977 (age 49) Brooklyn, New York, U.S.
- Listed height: 6 ft 2 in (1.88 m)
- Listed weight: 180 lb (82 kg)

Career information
- High school: Abraham Lincoln (Brooklyn, New York)
- College: Georgia Tech (1995–1996)
- NBA draft: 1996: 1st round, 4th overall pick
- Drafted by: Milwaukee Bucks
- Playing career: 1996–2018
- Position: Point guard
- Number: 3, 33, 8
- Coaching career: 2019–2023

Career history

Playing
- 1996–1999: Minnesota Timberwolves
- 1999–2001: New Jersey Nets
- 2001–2004: Phoenix Suns
- 2004–2009: New York Knicks
- 2009: Boston Celtics
- 2010: Shanxi Zhongyu Brave Dragons
- 2010–2011: Foshan Dralions
- 2011–2017: Beijing Ducks
- 2017–2018: Beijing Fly Dragons

Coaching
- 2019–2023: Beijing Royal Fighters

Career highlights
- As player: 2× NBA All-Star (2001, 2003); 2× All-NBA Third Team (2000, 2003); NBA All-Rookie First Team (1997); 3× CBA champion (2012, 2014, 2015); CBA Finals MVP (2015); CBA International MVP (2013); 7× CBA All-Star (2010, 2011, 2012, 2013, 2014 (Did not participate due to injury), 2015, 2017); CBA All-Star MVP (2010); Third-team All-American – AP, NABC (1996); First-team All-ACC (1996); ACC Rookie of the Year (1996); 2× First-team Parade All-American (1994, 1995); McDonald's All-American (1995); Gatorade National Player of the Year (1995); Mr. New York Basketball (1995); As head coach: 3× CBA All-Star Rookies (2012, 2013, 2020)

Career NBA statistics
- Points: 16,297 (19.3 ppg)
- Assists: 6,471 (7.6 apg)
- Steals: 1,022 (1.2 spg)
- Stats at NBA.com
- Stats at Basketball Reference
Medals
Men's basketball
Representing United States
Summer Olympics
Bronze medal – third place	2004 Athens	Team competition
FIBA Americas U18 Championship
Gold medal – first place	1994 Santa Rosa	Team competition

Stephon Xavier Marbury (born February 20, 1977) is an American former professional basketball player and coach. A point guard, Marbury played college basketball for the Georgia Tech Yellow Jackets for one season. He was selected as the fourth overall pick in the 1996 NBA draft by the Milwaukee Bucks; shortly thereafter, he was traded to the Minnesota Timberwolves. A two-time NBA All-Star and two-time member of the All-NBA Team, Marbury played for five teams in a 13-year NBA career that ended in 2009. He then played in the Chinese Basketball Association (CBA) until his retirement in 2018. During his time in the CBA, Marbury won three CBA championships, was named Finals MVP in 2015, and made three CBA All-Star Games. He also served as head coach of the Beijing Royal Fighters from 2019 to 2023.

== Early years ==
Marbury has often gone by the nickname "Starbury", a name created during his youth. Marbury, the sixth of seven children, was born and raised in the Coney Island neighborhood of Brooklyn, New York City. He attended elementary school, PS 329. During his teenage years, he starred at NYC powerhouse Abraham Lincoln High School, After his senior year Marbury was named New York State Mr. Basketball, after averaging 27.4 points, 8.3 assists and 3 steals per game. He was often heralded as the next great NYC point guard, expected to follow the success of NBA stand-outs Mark Jackson and Kenny Anderson.

While still attending Abraham Lincoln High School he was one of the subjects of Darcy Frey's book The Last Shot, which followed three seniors and Marbury, a freshman, through the early months of his first season with the school's team. In high school, he played for the AAU team the New York Gauchos.

== College ==
=== Recruitment ===
He was named a 1995 McDonald's All-American along with future NBA All-Stars Kevin Garnett, Paul Pierce, Shareef Abdur-Rahim, and Antawn Jamison. Marbury was listed as one of the top five recruits in the country that year and was pursued by Georgia Tech Yellow Jackets coach Bobby Cremins, with whom he eventually committed.

=== Georgia Tech ===
At Georgia Tech, Marbury took over the starting point guard role left vacant with Travis Best's departure. Teaming with future NBA players Matt Harpring and Drew Barry, Marbury led Georgia Tech to a 24–12 record en route to the Regional Semi-final game of the NCAA tournament, where the Yellow Jackets lost to Cincinnati 87–70. For the season, Marbury averaged 18.9 ppg and 4.5 assists and was named a Third Team All American by the Associated Press, along with several conference honors. Following the season he declared himself eligible for the 1996 NBA draft.

== Professional career ==
=== Minnesota Timberwolves (1996–1999) ===
He was selected fourth overall by the Milwaukee Bucks in the 1996 NBA draft, then traded to the Minnesota Timberwolves for the draft rights to Ray Allen (who was drafted immediately after him) and a future first-round pick. In his first season in the league, Marbury averaged 15.8 points and 7.8 assists per game and was named to the 1997 All-Rookie Team. He and second-year player Kevin Garnett led the Timberwolves to the NBA playoffs in 1997 and 1998. During the 1997 NBA Playoffs, Marbury led Minnesota in scoring with 28 points during a first round Game 1 loss to the Houston Rockets.

During the lockout-shortened 1999 season, Marbury's agent, David Falk, demanded a trade. Marbury said he wanted to be closer to his family and friends. Other reports said he wanted to go to a market that would provide more endorsement opportunities, while others suggested that Marbury genuinely disliked Minnesota and was jealous of Kevin Garnett's new contract. Marbury was ultimately traded to the New Jersey Nets, alongside Bill Curley and Chris Carr of the Timberwolves and Elliot Perry of the Milwaukee Bucks in a three-way trade where the Timberwolves acquired Terrell Brandon, Brian Evans and draft considerations and the Bucks acquired Sam Cassell and Chris Gatling.

=== New Jersey Nets (1999–2001) ===
While in New Jersey, Marbury blossomed into an All-Star. Marbury made the All-NBA 3rd Team in 2000 and was selected as a reserve for the 2001 All-Star Game, where he hit 2 clutch threes to win the game. Marbury also scored a career-high 50 points on February 13, 2001, in an overtime loss against the Los Angeles Lakers. Despite his individual accolades, the Nets never made the playoffs during Marbury's time with the team.

=== Phoenix Suns (2001–2004) ===
Marbury was traded to the Phoenix Suns along with Johnny Newman and Soumaila Samake in the 2001 offseason for Jason Kidd and Chris Dudley. On November 30, 2002, Marbury scored a season-high 43 points, including 26 in the 4th quarter, to lead the Suns to a 94–87 win over the San Antonio Spurs. As a Sun, Marbury made his second All-Star team and the All-NBA 3rd team in 2003. Teamed with Rookie of the Year Amar'e Stoudemire and All-Star Shawn Marion, the trio took the team to the 2003 NBA playoffs, but the Suns were ousted by the Spurs in the first round.

=== New York Knicks (2004–2009) ===
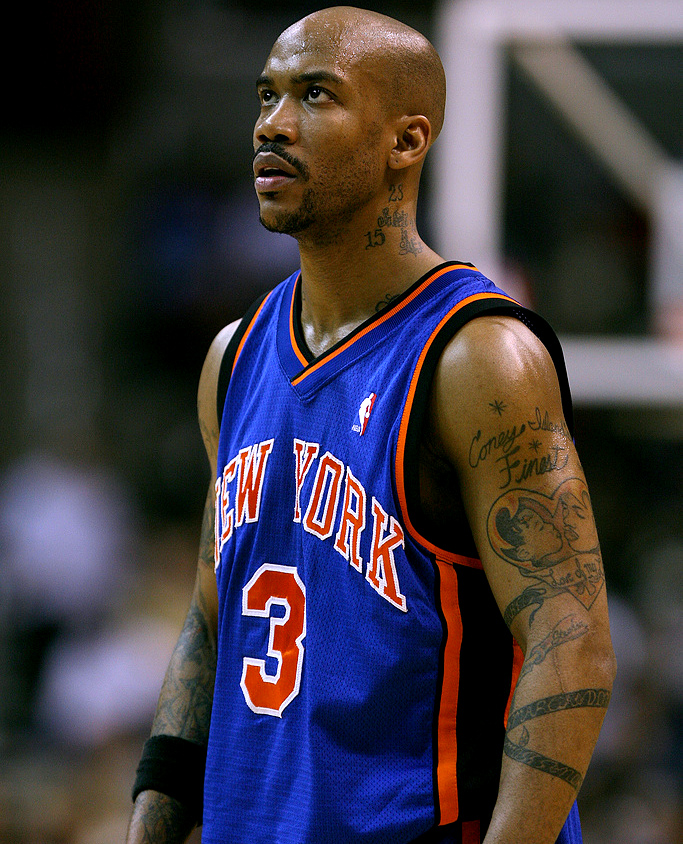
Marbury with the Knicks

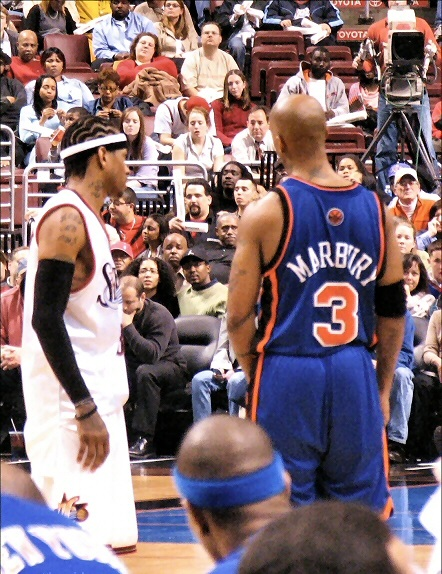
Marbury speaks with Allen Iverson, the two guards frequently were in the same conversation for All Star and All NBA nods

Marbury, Penny Hardaway and Cezary Trybański were traded to the New York Knicks on January 5, 2004, for Howard Eisley, Charlie Ward, Antonio McDyess, Maciej Lampe, draft rights to Miloš Vujanić, a first-round 2004 draft choice, and an additional future first-round draft choice. This brought Marbury full circle, as he grew up in New York and was a lifelong Knicks fan.

Marbury played for the U.S. in the 2004 Summer Olympics, the first of the U.S. teams composed of NBA players to fail to win the gold medal at the Olympics. He and his teammates returned with bronze. Despite the disappointment, Marbury scored a U.S. team Olympic record 31 points in a game against Spain (since eclipsed by Carmelo Anthony in 2012).

During the 2005–06 season Marbury feuded with head coach Larry Brown. Towards the end of the 2005–2006 season, the Knicks' poor performance combined with Marbury's public spats with his coach led to a severe decline in Marbury's popularity, with Frank Isola and Michael O'Keefe of the New York Daily News stating that Marbury is "the most reviled athlete in New York."

The public feud between Marbury and Brown was one of the reasons Larry Brown was fired at the end of the 2005–06 season. Isiah Thomas took over the coaching role and the Knicks were slightly more successful during the 2006–2007 season, surpassing the previous year's 23 wins, 54 games into their 82-game season, before falling off and finishing with only 33.

In September 2007, Marbury testified at the trial of a sexual harassment lawsuit that had been filed against the Knicks and Isiah Thomas. At the trial, Marbury testified that he and a Knicks intern had "got[ten] together" in his car outside a strip club in 2005.

The start of the 2007–08 season found the Knicks again floundering and Marbury again involved in a public feud, this time with Thomas. The pivotal incident involved Marbury leaving the team after learning that Thomas planned to remove him from the starting lineup. There were reports that Marbury and Thomas actually came to blows on the team plane, and that Marbury threatened to blackmail Thomas for taking him out of the starting lineup—both in the presence of Knick teammates. Following the incident and Marbury's return to the team in mid-November after one missed game, Knick fans consistently chanted "fire Isiah" at home games and constantly booed virtually all of the Knicks, especially Marbury. The dysfunction and drama were accompanied by 8 straight Knicks losses, and several newspapers reported that Isiah's job was in jeopardy. There were also rumors that the Knicks wanted to trade Marbury to another team. However, this proved difficult for the Knicks to accomplish, in view of the two years and approximately $42 million remaining under his contract with the Knicks. Following a season-ending ankle surgery in February 2008, which was reportedly deemed unnecessary by the team, but which Marbury elected to undergo regardless, Isiah Thomas hinted that Marbury could have played his final game in a Knicks uniform. However, in April 2008, it was Thomas who was removed from his position; first as president, being replaced by Donnie Walsh, and then as coach, being replaced by Mike D'Antoni.

After D'Antoni took over, the Knicks signed Chris Duhon, leading to speculations over Marbury's future in New York. Marbury arrived to training camp, and competed with Duhon for the starting point guard job, which Duhon won. When D'Antoni told Marbury that he had an opportunity to play approximately 35 minutes in a game if he wanted to, Marbury, apparently feeling he and the Knicks had gone their own ways, allegedly refused. Following that, on December 1, Marbury was banned from attending any Knicks' practices or games.

=== Boston Celtics (2009) ===
On February 24, 2009, the Knicks and Marbury agreed to a buyout after much speculation. He cleared waivers two days later, making him a free agent. Marbury had been speculated to join the Boston Celtics by many NBA analysts since late 2008, and on February 27, 2009, Marbury signed with the Celtics. In his debut, he played against the Indiana Pacers, adding 8 points on 4 of 6 shooting, and 2 assists in 13 minutes. Marbury wore the jersey number 8, as No. 3 had been retired in honor of Dennis Johnson.

Marbury was offered a one-year contract by the Celtics for the 2009–10 season for the veteran's minimum. However, he did not agree to the contract. He later announced that he would take a year off from basketball to attend to his business interests.

=== Shanxi Zhongyu Brave Dragons (2010) ===
In January 2010, it was announced that Marbury had signed with the Shanxi Zhongyu Brave Dragons of the Chinese Basketball Association. In his first game, Marbury, suffering from jet lag, contributed 15 points, 4 rebounds, 8 assists, and 4 steals in 28 minutes of action. He averaged 22.9 points, 9.5 assists and 2.6 steals in 15 games, but Shanxi eventually failed to advance to the playoffs. Marbury later participated in the CBA All-Star match between the North and the South teams, contributing 30 points and 10 assists for the North team. He won the MVP title for the All-Star game. In July 2010, Marbury agreed to a three-year deal to remain with the Brave Dragons. However, he left the team in December 2010.

=== Foshan Dralions (2010–2011) ===
In December 2010 Marbury joined the Foshan Dralions. Like the previous season, Marbury played in the starting five of the 2011 CBA All-Star match, but his team failed to make the playoffs.

=== Beijing Ducks (2011–2017) ===
During the 2011–2012 season, the Beijing Ducks, led by Stephon Marbury, started out the season with a 13–0 record. Like the previous two seasons, Marbury played in the starting five for the 2012 CBA All-Star match, but unlike the previous two years, his team made the playoffs. Averaging 45 points per game during the Shanxi series, Marbury led Beijing to their first ever CBA Finals match-up against the 7-time champion Guangdong Southern Tigers. Marbury then led his Beijing Ducks Team to the 2011–2012 season CBA championship. Following the team's championship, in May 2012, a statue of Marbury was unveiled on the lawn of the MasterCard Center, the 2008 Olympic basketball arena, in Beijing. Dennis Rodman spoke at the ceremony.

In the second game of the 2012–13 CBA season, Marbury tallied 13 assists in a victory over the Jilin Northeast Tigers. This was the highest number of assists Marbury had produced in a single game since his tenure with the Ducks began. He then scored 32 points in an away game against Liaoning. Beijing won that game by 4 points. He was named the CBA Foreign MVP for the season.

On March 30, 2014, Marbury won a second CBA championship with the Beijing Ducks. On March 22, 2015, he won his third CBA championship with his team, as well as his first official CBA Finals MVP award.

On February 25, 2017, Marbury announced he would retire at the end of the 2017-18 CBA season.

On April 24, 2017, the Ducks officially parted ways with Marbury.

=== Beijing Fly Dragons (2017–2018) ===
On July 19, 2017, Marbury announced that for his last season, he would play for the Beijing Fly Dragons. He later posted that after his season with the Fly Dragons concluded, he'd look to try and finish his career with an NBA team. However, on February 11, 2018, Marbury played his final game in the CBA, scoring 20 points in a 104–92 win over the Jiangsu Dragons, and announced his retirement from basketball.

== Coaching career ==
On June 24, 2019, Marbury was named head coach of the Beijing Royal Fighters of the Chinese Basketball Association (CBA). He helped turn around the team's performance.

On March 8, 2020, Marbury warned NBA Commissioner Adam Silver to stop the 2019–2020 season, saying, "the game won't be fun if people die." He specifically asked Silver to "be the one to make the hard, easy decision." This request was made three days before the first NBA player tested positive for the coronavirus and Silver suspended the season.

== Personal life ==
=== Family ===
Stephon's father Don died on December 2, 2007, during a game between the Knicks and the Phoenix Suns.

Stephon's brother Zach has played professional basketball in Venezuela. Marbury is a cousin of former professional basketball player Sebastian Telfair. He is also a cousin of former Providence College star and former NBA journeyman Jamel Thomas. Marbury is also a cousin of Dodgers outfielder Josue De Paula. In a book, Thomas claimed Marbury's selfish actions in Minnesota prevented Thomas from signing a contract with the Timberwolves.

Stephon and his wife Latasha married on September 14, 2002. They divorced in 2023. He has three children: Xaviera, Stephon II, and Stephanie.

On April 7, 2025, he married Chinese singer and former "The Voice of China" contestant Wang Yuling (aka Catina Mezereon) in Philadelphia.

=== Legal issues and controversies ===
Marbury was jailed 10 days for DUI after being stopped and arrested for driving 25 miles per hour above the speed limit. At the time of his arrest, he registered more than twice Arizona's legal limit of blood alcohol level.

In 2007, Marbury admitted in federal court to having affairs with an intern after a group outing to a strip club in 2005.

=== Philanthropy ===
In 2001, Marbury donated $250,000 of the money derived from Pepsi sponsorships to help victims of the September 11 attacks.

In 2005, Marbury donated between $500,000 and $1,000,000 to help victims of Hurricane Katrina.

In 2007, Marbury donated $4,000,000 to New York City, $1,000,000 each to the NYPD, FDNY, EMT, and New York City Teacher's Fund.

In 2014, Marbury was named one of the Top 10 Model Citizens for Beijing due to his commitment to the Beijing community and the charity work he provided for it. He became the first international citizen to earn such an honor since its inception by the Beijing government.

In 2020, during the COVID-19 pandemic, Marbury worked with a China supplier to sell millions of masks at cost to assist first responders and hospital workers in New York City.

=== Fashion ===
In 2006, Marbury partnered with Steve & Barry's to promote a line of shoes and clothing bearing his nickname, "Starbury". The line of shoes he endorsed sold for $14.98, far less than many other shoe lines. The reason for doing so, he stated at the time, was to provide kids a way to get fashionable basketball shoes for a reasonable price, and avoid the problem of having expensive shoes that are the target of theft. Marbury was not paid to endorse the shoes, but was compensated based on sales of the shoes. Since then, but not due to business with Marbury, Steve & Barry's filed for bankruptcy and closed all stores. Shortly after Steve & Barry's closed, Marbury opened Starbury.com to sell his shoes and an expanded product line through a partnership with Amazon.com. Starbury has also announced plans to open dozens of stores and a distributorship in China. In May 2017, Marbury expressed interest in helping Big Baller Brand partner with a Chinese sports apparel company.

=== In popular culture ===
Marbury is on the cover of the Midway video game NBA Ballers. He has been named to The Sporting News list of "Good Guys in Sports" three times.

In the Spike Lee movie He Got Game, fictional Brooklyn high school star Jesus Shuttlesworth (played by Ray Allen) mentions Stephon Marbury as one of the great New York City legends to make it out of Coney Island to the NBA. The high school in the movie, Abraham Lincoln, is where Marbury attended high school.

In 1999, Marbury, alongside fellow former Georgia Tech point guard Kenny Anderson, appeared in the video for Big Pun's single "Whatcha Gonna Do" which was produced by Juju of The Beatnuts. In the video, Marbury and Anderson play a 2 on 2 game versus Terror Squad members Fat Joe and Cuban Link.

In 2007, Marbury co-authored his first children's book with writer Marshall Dean entitled The Adventures of Young Starbury: Practice Makes Perfect. The book was illustrated by Ryan Nakai.

In March 2008, wrestler Montel Vontavious Porter said in an interview that he based his wrestling persona on Marbury. M.V.P. said he had an encounter with Marbury when he was a doorman at a club.

In July 2009, Marbury engaged in a 24-hour live-streaming broadcast in which he answered questions from fans, openly wept, and ate Vaseline to soothe a sore throat. He would later admit that he was depressed and suicidal at the time.

Marbury appeared in the 2014 musical I Am Marbury, which is allegorically based on his life.

Marbury starred in his own documentary Stephon Marbury: Remade in China. Released in 2016, the short documentary details Marbury's rocky relationship with the New York Knicks and how he found his love of basketball again after overcoming depression thanks to being in China. Cameo appearances include Ahmad Rashad, Adam Silver, and Gary Payton.

In 2017, Marbury starred in his own autobiographical movie titled My Other Home, alongside Jessica Jung.

A documentary about Marbury, A Kid from Coney Island, was released in 2019.

=== Residency ===
In 2015, Marbury applied for and received a Chinese "green card", or Permanent Resident ID Card (外国人永久居留身份证). He is the fifth American basketball player to receive a green card in China. He also earned the nickname Commissar Ma (simplified Chinese: 马政委; traditional Chinese: 馬政委) for his role as a mentor to the teammates and younger players while playing in China.

On November 15, 2023, Marbury obtained Hong Kong residency under the Category A of Top Talent Pass Scheme.

=== Sports team owner ===
On October 20, 2017, it was announced that Marbury had reached an agreement to become the owner of the Beijing Lions of the China Arena Football League.

== Career statistics ==
Legend
GP	Games played	GS	Games started	MPG	Minutes per game
FG%	Field goal percentage	3P%	3-point field goal percentage	FT%	Free throw percentage
RPG	Rebounds per game	APG	Assists per game	SPG	Steals per game
BPG	Blocks per game	PPG	Points per game	**Bold**	Career high
*	Led the league

=== NBA ===
==== Regular season ====
Year	Team	GP	GS	MPG	FG%	3P%	FT%	RPG	APG	SPG	BPG	PPG
1996–97	Minnesota	67	64	34.7	.408	.354	.727	2.7	7.8	1.0	**.3**	15.8
1997–98	Minnesota	**82***	81	38.0	.415	.313	.731	2.8	8.6	1.3	.1	17.7
1998–99	Minnesota	18	18	36.7	.408	.205	.724	**3.4**	**9.3**	1.6	**.3**	17.7
1998–99	New Jersey	31	31	39.8	.439	.367	.832	2.6	8.7	1.0	.1	23.4
1999–00	New Jersey	74	74	38.9	.432	.283	.813	3.2	8.4	1.5	.2	22.2
2000–01	New Jersey	67	67	38.2	.441	.328	.790	3.1	7.6	1.2	.1	**23.9**
2001–02	Phoenix	**82**	80	38.9	.442	.286	.781	3.2	8.1	.9	.2	20.4
2002–03	Phoenix	81	81	40.0	.439	.301	.803	3.2	8.1	1.3	.2	22.3
2003–04	Phoenix	34	34	**41.6**	.432	.314	.795	**3.4**	8.3	**1.9**	.1	20.8
2003–04	New York	47	47	39.1	.431	.321	.833	3.1	**9.3**	1.4	.1	19.8
2004–05	New York	**82**	**82***	40.0	**.462**	.354	**.834**	3.0	8.1	1.5	.1	21.7
2005–06	New York	60	60	36.6	.451	.317	.755	2.9	6.4	1.1	.1	16.3
2006–07	New York	74	74	37.1	.415	.357	.769	2.9	5.4	1.0	.1	16.4
2007–08	New York	24	19	33.5	.419	**.378**	.716	2.5	4.7	.9	.1	13.9
2008–09	Boston	23	4	18.0	.342	.240	.462	1.2	3.3	.4	.1	3.8
Career		846	816	37.7	.433	.325	.784	3.0	7.6	1.2	.1	19.3
All-Star		2	0	16.5	.500	.400	.500	.5	5.0	.0	.0	8.0

==== Playoffs ====
Year	Team	GP	GS	MPG	FG%	3P%	FT%	RPG	APG	SPG	BPG	PPG
1997	Minnesota	3	3	39.0	**.400**	**.300**	.600	4.0	**7.7**	.7	.0	21.3
1998	Minnesota	5	5	41.8	.306	.280	.783	3.2	7.6	**2.4**	.0	13.8
2003	Phoenix	6	**6**	**45.3**	.375	.227	.758	4.0	5.7	1.2	.0	**22.0**
2004	New York	4	4	43.5	.373	**.300**	.680	**4.3**	6.5	1.8	.0	21.3
2009	Boston	**14**	0	11.9	.303	.250	**1.000**	.9	1.8	.1	.0	3.7
Career		32	18	29.3	.355	.273	.750	2.6	4.6	.9	.0	16.4

=== CBA ===
==== Regular season ====
Year	Team	GP	GS	MPG	FG%	3P%	FT%	RPG	APG	SPG	BPG	PPG
2009–10	Shanxi	15	15	34.1	.487	.366	.806	**5.9**	**9.5**	**2.6**	**.1**	22.9
2010–11	Foshan	32	32	**36.4**	.545	**.508**	**.816**	4.5	5.7	1.6	.0	25.2
2011–12	Beijing Ducks	31	31	35.3	.470	.283	.701	5.5	6.5	2.2	.0	25.0
2012–13	Beijing Ducks	30	30	35.0	.539	.386	.766	4.6	5.3	2.2	**.1**	**29.5**
2013–14	Beijing Ducks	12	12	29.4	.519	.477	.780	4.7	5.3	1.0	.0	16.9
2014–15	Beijing Ducks	**38**	**36**	31.8	**.555**	.406	.764	3.2	5.7	1.2	**.1**	16.3
2015–16	Beijing Ducks	36	**36**	31.9	.483	.366	.788	3.8	5.7	2.0	.0	18.4
2016–17	Beijing Ducks	36	**36**	34.4	.487	.341	.748	3.2	5.5	1.7	.1	21.4
2017–18	Beijing Fly Dragons	36	**36**	34.1	.464	.281	.663	3.0	4.7	1.6	.2	14.9

==== Playoffs ====
Year	Team	GP	GS	MPG	FG%	3P%	FT%	RPG	APG	SPG	BPG	PPG
2011–12	Beijing Ducks	14	13	33.6	.571	**.432**	.822	4.3	5.6	**3.4**	.1	**33.8**
2012–13	Beijing Ducks	6	6	35.8	.393	.265	**.848**	3.2	**8.2**	2.3	**.2**	22.0
2013–14	Beijing Ducks	**15**	**15**	37.2	.451	.283	.745	**4.8**	4.1	2.5	.0	25.7
2014–15	Beijing Ducks	13	13	**38.8**	**.575**	.375	.750	4.2	6.6	2.1	.1	24.6
2015–16	Beijing Ducks	4	4	37.8	.484	.481	.815	**4.8**	4.3	1.3	.0	31.8

=== College ===
Year	Team	GP	GS	MPG	FG%	3P%	FT%	RPG	APG	SPG	BPG	PPG
1995–96	Georgia Tech	36	35	37.4	.457	.370	.738	3.1	4.5	1.8	.1	18.9

== Filmography ==
- 1997: Big Bad Mamma Music Video by Foxy Brown (rapper) – Fairy Godfather
- 2000: ‘’The Jersey’’ – Himself (Episode: “Elliot and Goliath”)
- 2000: Between the Lions – Himself (3 episodes)
- 2004: NBA Ballers – Himself
- 2016: Stephon Marbury: Remade in China - Himself
- 2017: My Other Home — Best New Actor at 14th China Movie Channel Media Awards
- 2019: A Kid From Coney Island Documentary – Himself

== See also ==
- List of National Basketball Association career assists leaders
- List of All-Atlantic Coast Conference men's basketball teams
