= 2002–03 San Antonio Spurs season =

- NBA champions
- Conference champions
- Division champions
- Head coach: Gregg Popovich
- President: Gregg Popovich
- General manager: R. C. Buford
- Owner: Peter Holt
- Arena: SBC Center

Results
- Record: 60–22 (.732)
- Place: Division: 1st (Midwest); Conference: 1st (Western)
- Playoff finish: NBA champions (Defeated Nets 4–2)
- Stats at Basketball Reference

Local media
- Television: Fox Sports Net Southwest, KENS, KRRT
- Radio: KLEY

The 2002–03 San Antonio Spurs season was the 36th season for the San Antonio Spurs as a franchise, their 30th season in San Antonio, Texas, and their 27th season in the National Basketball Association. This was also the 14th and final season for former All-Star center, and long-time Spurs star David Robinson.

== Season summary ==
=== Off-season ===
For the season, the Spurs moved into their new arena known as the SBC Center. During the off-season, the team signed free agents Kevin Willis, acquired second-year guard Speedy Claxton from the Philadelphia 76ers on draft day, and re-acquired former Spurs guard, and three-point specialist Steve Kerr from the Portland Trail Blazers. Argentinian rookie shooting guard Manu Ginóbili, who was drafted by the team as the 57th overall pick in the 1999 NBA draft, made his debut for his first NBA season.

For the season, the Spurs redesigned their primary logo, replacing the colors turquoise, fuchsia and orange with their original color scheme of black, silver and white. The team's primary logo featured the city name "San Antonio" in white letters on a black background, above the team name "Spurs" in black letters with a white outline, and on a silver background with a white outline; the entire logo is surrounded by a silver outline. The letter "U" in "Spurs" is depicted as a silver spur with black shadows. The team also slightly updated their white home uniforms and black road uniforms. The silver outline around the black jersey numbers on the home jerseys were changed to silver and white outlines, and changed to silver and black outlines on the road jerseys. Both legs of the home and road shorts featured the team's new primary logo of a silver spur with black shadows.

The team's new primary logo would remain in use until 2017, while the slightly updated uniforms would last until 2010.

=== Regular season ===
With the addition of Ginóbili, the Spurs got off to a 19–13 start to the regular season, but later on posted a nine-game winning streak between January and February, and held a 33–16 record at the All-Star break. The Spurs posted an 11-game winning streak between March and April, and won 60 games for the second time in franchise history, finishing in first place in the Midwest Division with a league-best 60–22 record, and earning the first seed in the Western Conference; the team qualified for the NBA playoffs for the sixth consecutive year. Head coach Gregg Popovich was named the NBA Coach of the Year, despite the team only posting a two-game improvement over the previous season.

Tim Duncan averaged 23.3 points, 12.9 rebounds and 2.9 blocks per game, and was named the NBA Most Valuable Player of the Year for the second consecutive year; he was also named to the All-NBA First Team, and to the NBA All-Defensive First Team. In addition, second-year guard Tony Parker showed improvement, averaging 15.5 points and 5.3 assists per game, while Stephen Jackson provided the team with 11.8 points and 1.6 steals per game, sixth man Malik Rose contributed 10.4 points and 6.4 rebounds per game off the bench, and Robinson averaged 8.5 points, 7.9 rebounds and 1.7 blocks per game, which were career-lows. Meanwhile, Ginóbili contributed 7.6 points and 1.4 steals per game off the bench, and was named to the NBA All-Rookie Second Team, Bruce Bowen provided with 7.1 points per game and 101 three-point field goals, but struggled only shooting .404 in free-throw percentage, and was named to the NBA All-Defensive Second Team, and Steve Smith contributed 6.8 points per game.

During the NBA All-Star weekend at the Philips Arena in Atlanta, Georgia, Duncan was selected for the 2003 NBA All-Star Game, as a member of the Western Conference All-Star team. Meanwhile, Parker and Ginóbili were both selected for the NBA Rookie Challenge Game, as Parker was a member of the Sophomores team, while Ginóbili was a member of the Rookies team. Duncan also finished in fourth place in Defensive Player of the Year voting, with Bowen finishing in seventh place, while Parker finished in fourth place in Most Improved Player voting, with Jackson finishing tied in 18th place, Rose finished in sixth place in Sixth Man of the Year voting, and Ginóbili finished in fourth place in Rookie of the Year voting. This season marked the official beginning of the Big Three era, and the end of the Twin Towers era; the trio of Duncan, Parker, and Ginóbili would lead the Spurs to win 3 more championships in 2005, 2007, and 2014.

The Spurs finished eleventh in the NBA in home-game attendance, with an attendance of 735,990 at the SBC Center during the regular season.

=== NBA playoffs ===
In the Western Conference First Round of the 2003 NBA playoffs, the Spurs faced off against the 8th–seeded Phoenix Suns, a team that featured All-Star guard Stephon Marbury, All-Star forward Shawn Marion, and Rookie of the Year, Amar'e Stoudemire. The Spurs lost Game 1 to the Suns at home in overtime, 96–95 at the SBC Center, but then won the next two games, before losing Game 4 on the road, 86–84 at the America West Arena. The Spurs won the next two games, which included a Game 6 win over the Suns at the America West Arena, 87–85 to win the series in six games.

In the Western Conference Semi-finals, and for the third consecutive year, the team faced off against the 5th–seeded, and 3-time defending NBA champion Los Angeles Lakers, who were led by All-Star guard Kobe Bryant, All-Star center Shaquille O'Neal, and Derek Fisher. The Spurs won the first two games over the Lakers at the SBC Center, but then lost the next two games on the road, losing Game 4 to the Lakers at the Staples Center, 99–95. The Spurs managed to win the next two games, including a Game 6 road win over the Lakers at the Staples Center, 110–82 to win the series in six games.

In the Western Conference Finals, the Spurs then faced off against the 3rd–seeded Dallas Mavericks, who were led by the trio of All-Star forward Dirk Nowitzki, All-Star guard Steve Nash, and Michael Finley. The Spurs lost Game 1 to the Mavericks at home, 113–110 at the SBC Center, but managed to win the next three games, including a Game 4 road win over the Mavericks, 102–95 at the American Airlines Center. After losing Game 5 at the SBC Center, 103–91, the Spurs won Game 6 over the Mavericks at the American Airlines Center, 90–78 to win the series in six games, and advance to the NBA Finals.

In the 2003 NBA Finals, the Spurs faced off against the 2nd–seeded New Jersey Nets, who were led by the trio of All-Star guard Jason Kidd, Kenyon Martin, and second-year star Richard Jefferson. The Spurs took a 2–1 series lead before losing Game 4 to the Nets on the road, 77–76 at the Continental Airlines Arena. The Spurs managed to win the next two games, including a Game 6 home win over the Nets at the SBC Center, 88–77 to win the series in six games, winning their second NBA championship in franchise history, and their first title since 1999; Duncan was named the NBA Finals Most Valuable Player for the second time.

=== Aftermath ===
Following the season, Jackson signed as a free agent with the Atlanta Hawks, while Smith signed with the New Orleans Hornets, and Robinson, Kerr and Danny Ferry all retired.

== NBA draft ==
Round	Pick	Player	Position	Nationality	College
1	26	John Salmons	SG/SF	United States	Miami
2	55	Luis Scola	F	Argentina	TAU Cerámica (Spain)
2	56	Randy Holcomb	F	United States	San Diego State

== Roster ==
2002–03 San Antonio Spurs roster
Players

Pos.	No.	Player	Height	Weight	DOB	From
C	34	Mengke Bateer	6 ft 11 in (2.11 m)	290 lb (132 kg)	1975–11–20	China
SF	12	Bruce Bowen	6 ft 7 in (2.01 m)	200 lb (91 kg)	1971–06–14	Cal State Fullerton
PG	10	Speedy Claxton	5 ft 11 in (1.80 m)	166 lb (75 kg)	1978–05–08	Hofstra
PF	21	Tim Duncan	6 ft 11 in (2.11 m)	255 lb (116 kg)	1976–04–25	Wake Forest
SF	35	Danny Ferry	6 ft 10 in (2.08 m)	235 lb (107 kg)	1966–10–17	Duke
SG	20	Manu Ginóbili	6 ft 6 in (1.98 m)	200 lb (91 kg)	1977–07–28	Argentina
SG	3	Stephen Jackson	6 ft 8 in (2.03 m)	220 lb (100 kg)	1978–04–05	Butler CC
PG	25	Steve Kerr	6 ft 3 in (1.91 m)	175 lb (79 kg)	1965–09–27	Arizona
PG	9	Tony Parker	6 ft 2 in (1.88 m)	185 lb (84 kg)	1982–05–17	France
C	50	David Robinson	7 ft 1 in (2.16 m)	235 lb (107 kg)	1965–08–06	Navy
PF	31	Malik Rose	6 ft 7 in (2.01 m)	250 lb (113 kg)	1974–11–23	Drexel
SG	8	Steve Smith	6 ft 7 in (2.01 m)	200 lb (91 kg)	1969–03–31	Michigan State
C	42	Kevin Willis	7 ft 0 in (2.13 m)	245 lb (111 kg)	1962–09–06	Michigan State

Coaches
Head coach
- Gregg Popovich
Assistant(s)
- Mike Brown
- Mike Budenholzer
- P. J. Carlesimo
- Joe Prunty
- Will Sevening (trainer)

Legend
- (DP) Unsigned draft pick
- (FA) Free agent
- (S) Suspended
- Injured

Roster

== Regular season ==
=== Standings ===
Midwest Division	W	L	PCT	GB	Home	Road	Div
y-San Antonio Spurs	60	22	.732	–	33–8	27–14	17–7
x-Dallas Mavericks	60	22	.732	–	33–8	27–14	18–6
x-Minnesota Timberwolves	51	31	.622	9	33–8	18–23	15–9
x-Utah Jazz	47	35	.573	13	29–12	18–23	15–9
e-Houston Rockets	43	39	.524	17	28–13	15–26	11–13
e-Memphis Grizzlies	28	54	.341	32	20–21	8–33	5–17
e-Denver Nuggets	17	65	.207	43	13–28	4–37	3–21

#	Western Conference				
#	Team	W	L	PCT	GB
1	z-San Antonio Spurs	60	22	.732	–
2	y-Sacramento Kings	59	23	.720	1
3	x-Dallas Mavericks	60	22	.732	–
4	x-Minnesota Timberwolves	51	31	.622	9
5	x-Los Angeles Lakers	50	32	.610	10
6	x-Portland Trail Blazers	50	32	.610	10
7	x-Utah Jazz	47	35	.573	13
8	x-Phoenix Suns	44	38	.537	16
9	e-Houston Rockets	43	39	.524	17
10	e-Seattle SuperSonics	40	42	.488	20
11	e-Golden State Warriors	38	44	.463	22
12	e-Memphis Grizzlies	28	54	.341	32
13	e-Los Angeles Clippers	27	55	.329	33
14	e-Denver Nuggets	17	65	.207	43

=== Game log ===
2002–03 game log
Total: 60–22 (home: 33–8; road: 27–14)
October: 1–1 (home: 0–0; road: 1–1)

Game	Date	Team	Score	High points	High rebounds	High assists	Location Attendance	Record
1	October 29	@ L.A. Lakers	W 87–82	Malik Rose (16)	Malik Rose (11)	Speedy Claxton (4)	Staples Center; 18,997	1–0
2	October 30	@ Golden State	L 98–106	Tim Duncan (24)	David Robinson (15)	Tony Parker (8)	The Arena in Oakland; 13,261	1–1

November : 10–6 (home: 8–2; road: 2–4)

Game	Date	Team	Score	High points	High rebounds	High assists	Location Attendance	Record
3	November 1	Toronto	W 91–72	Tim Duncan (22)	Tim Duncan (15)	Tony Parker (4)	SBC Center; 18,787	2–1
4	November 4	@ Memphis	W 103–101 (OT)	Tim Duncan (29)	Tim Duncan (14)	Tony Parker (6)	Pyramid Arena; 12,226	3–1
5	November 5	Golden State	W 93–73	Tony Parker (21)	David Robinson (13)	Tim Duncan (6)	SBC Center; 14,474	4–1
6	November 9	Portland	L 76–95	Tim Duncan (16)	Malik Rose (11)	Stephen Jackson (4)	SBC Center; 18,781	4–2
7	November 11	Minnesota	W 91–75	Tim Duncan (20)	David Robinson (19)	Tony Parker (12)	SBC Center; 15,594	5–2
8	November 13	@ New Jersey	L 82–91	Tim Duncan (21)	David Robinson (14)	Bruce Bowen (4)	Continental Airlines Arena; 11,534	5–3
9	November 14	@ Philadelphia	L 94–99	Tim Duncan (29)	Duncan, Jackson (9)	Duncan, Parker (5)	First Union Center; 18,139	5–4
10	November 16	@ Cleveland	W 90–77	Bruce Bowen (14)	Malik Rose (13)	Tony Parker (9)	Gund Arena; 10,031	6–4
11	November 18	Cleveland	W 104–78	Tim Duncan (25)	Tim Duncan (9)	Steve Smith (8)	SBC Center; 14,767	7–4
12	November 20	L.A. Lakers	W 95–88	Stephen Jackson (28)	Tim Duncan (18)	Tim Duncan (5)	SBC Center; 18,797	8–4
13	November 22	Memphis	W 95–86	Tim Duncan (28)	Tim Duncan (15)	Tony Parker (6)	SBC Center; 16,636	9–4
14	November 24	Seattle	L 90–91	Tim Duncan (22)	David Robinson (17)	Tony Parker (5)	SBC Center; 16,211	9–5
15	November 26	@ Denver	L 81–85	Tim Duncan (18)	Tim Duncan (18)	Tony Parker (8)	Pepsi Center; 11,851	9–6
16	November 27	Denver	W 99–68	Stephen Jackson (22)	Tim Duncan (14)	Duncan, Parker (5)	SBC Center; 16,935	10–6
17	November 29	@ Phoenix	L 87–94	Tim Duncan (31)	Tim Duncan (15)	Duncan, Parker (5)	America West Arena; 17,252	10–7
18	November 30	Utah	W 107–85	Stephen Jackson (17)	David Robinson (10)	Tony Parker (4)	SBC Center; 18,797	11–7

December : 8–6 (home: 5–1; road: 3–5)

Game	Date	Team	Score	High points	High rebounds	High assists	Location Attendance	Record
19	December 3	@ Houston	L 75–89	Tim Duncan (25)	Tim Duncan (12)	Tony Parker (5)	Compaq Center; 11,120	11–8
20	December 6	Philadelphia	W 98–93	Tim Duncan (29)	David Robinson (12)	Duncan, Parker (6)	SBC Center; 17,985	12–8
21	December 8	Sacramento	L 80–104	Tim Duncan (16)	Tim Duncan (13)	Tony Parker (4)	SBC Center; 16,873	12–9
22	December 11	Dallas	W 111–104	Tony Parker (32)	Tim Duncan (13)	Tony Parker (6)	SBC Center; 17,632	13–9
23	December 13	L.A. Clippers	W 97–84	Tim Duncan (25)	Tim Duncan (18)	Tony Parker (9)	SBC Center; 16,696	14–9
24	December 16	@ L.A. Clippers	L 79–91	Tim Duncan (32)	Tim Duncan (11)	Tony Parker (5)	Staples Center; 16,575	14–10
25	December 18	@ Seattle	W 91–88	Tony Parker (22)	Tim Duncan (15)	Tim Duncan (8)	KeyArena; 15,831	15–10
26	December 19	@ Sacramento	W 83–81	Tim Duncan (23)	Tim Duncan (14)	Tim Duncan (5)	ARCO Arena; 17,317	16–10
27	December 21	Washington	W 92–81	Tony Parker (21)	Tim Duncan (11)	Tony Parker (6)	SBC Center; 18,797	17–10
28	December 23	New Orleans	W 99–94 (OT)	Tim Duncan (29)	Tim Duncan (23)	Duncan, Parker (4)	SBC Center; 18,797	18–10
29	December 27	@ Atlanta	L 79–81	Tim Duncan (27)	Tim Duncan (15)	Tim Duncan (5)	Philips Arena; 13,453	18–11
30	December 28	@ Chicago	W 109–95	Tony Parker (32)	Tim Duncan (15)	Tony Parker (10)	United Center; 18,172	19–11
31	December 30	@ New York	L 95–96	Tim Duncan (31)	Tim Duncan (17)	Tony Parker (5)	Madison Square Garden; 19,763	19–12
32	December 31	@ Washington	L 103–105	Tim Duncan (35)	Tim Duncan (13)	Tim Duncan (5)	MCI Center; 20,173	19–13

January : 11–3 (home: 6–1; road: 5–2)

Game	Date	Team	Score	High points	High rebounds	High assists	Location Attendance	Record
33	January 3	Golden State	W 98–95	Tim Duncan (37)	Tim Duncan (9)	Tony Parker (6)	SBC Center; 18,797	20–13
34	January 5	@ L.A. Clippers	W 94–86	Tony Parker (26)	Tim Duncan (14)	Duncan, Parker (6)	Staples Center; 17,158	21–13
35	January 8	@ Seattle	W 106–95	Tim Duncan (23)	Tim Duncan (9)	Tim Duncan (6)	KeyArena; 15,132	22–13
36	January 9	@ Portland	L 87–90	Stephen Jackson (18)	Tim Duncan (12)	Duncan, Ginóbili (5)	Rose Garden Arena; 19,021	22–14
37	January 12	Boston	W 81–80	Tim Duncan (21)	Tim Duncan (9)	three players tied (3)	SBC Center; 17,302	23–14
38	January 14	Phoenix	W 108–100 (OT)	Tim Duncan (38)	Tim Duncan (16)	Tim Duncan (9)	SBC Center; 17,101	24–14
39	January 17	Atlanta	W 106–93	Tim Duncan (27)	Tim Duncan (9)	Tony Parker (4)	SBC Center; 18,007	25–14
40	January 20	Houston	W 87–82	Tim Duncan (32)	Tim Duncan (9)	Tony Parker (8)	SBC Center; 17,537	26–14
41	January 22	Memphis	L 93–98	Tim Duncan (30)	Tim Duncan (21)	Tony Parker (8)	SBC Center; 17,126	26–15
42	January 24	@ Utah	W 91–90	Tim Duncan (29)	Tim Duncan (17)	Tim Duncan (6)	Delta Center; 19,911	27–15
43	January 25	Detroit	W 108–76	Tim Duncan (22)	Tim Duncan (11)	Tony Parker (9)	SBC Center; 17,353	28–15
44	January 27	@ Minnesota	L 95–106	Tony Parker (19)	Malik Rose (11)	Stephen Jackson (6)	Target Center; 14,306	28–16
45	January 29	@ Indiana	W 106–97	Tony Parker (28)	three players tied (9)	Tony Parker (7)	Conseco Fieldhouse; 15,110	29–16
46	January 31	@ Orlando	W 109–108	Tim Duncan (23)	Tim Duncan (17)	Tony Parker (13)	TD Waterhouse Centre; 15,654	30–16

February : 9–1 (home: 3–0; road: 6–1)

Game	Date	Team	Score	High points	High rebounds	High assists	Location Attendance	Record
47	February 1	@ Miami	W 67–65	Tony Parker (18)	Tim Duncan (25)	Tim Duncan (4)	American Airlines Arena; 15,729	31–16
48	February 5	@ Golden State	W 103–99	Tim Duncan (30)	Tim Duncan (12)	Tony Parker (10)	The Arena in Oakland; 13,553	32–16
49	February 6	@ Denver	W 83–74	Tim Duncan (25)	Malik Rose (10)	Tony Parker (8)	Pepsi Center; 15,206	33–16
All-Star Break
50	February 11	@ Portland	W 116–111 (OT)	Tim Duncan (36)	Rose, Duncan (15)	Tony Parker (8)	Rose Garden Arena; 19,631	34–16
51	February 14	@ L.A. Lakers	W 103–95	Tim Duncan (28)	Tim Duncan (20)	Tony Parker (6)	Staples Center; 18,997	35–16
52	February 16	@ Sacramento	W 104–101	Tim Duncan (34)	Tim Duncan (12)	Tony Parker (7)	ARCO Arena; 17,317	36–16
53	February 18	Denver	W 101–76	Bruce Bowen (18)	Tim Duncan (12)	Tony Parker (8)	SBC Center; 17,274	37–16
54	February 20	@ Dallas	L 87–95	Malik Rose (25)	Malik Rose (14)	Manu Ginóbili (4)	American Airlines Center; 20,036	37–17
55	February 22	Indiana	W 105–96	Tim Duncan (21)	Tim Duncan (10)	Duncan, Jackson (4)	SBC Center; 18,797	38–17
56	February 25	Miami	W 84–69	Tim Duncan (17)	Tim Duncan (10)	Tony Parker (7)	SBC Center; 17,322	39–17

March : 14–3 (home: 8–3; road: 6–0)

Game	Date	Team	Score	High points	High rebounds	High assists	Location Attendance	Record
57	March 1	Sacramento	W 108–100	Tony Parker (32)	Tim Duncan (15)	Parker, Ginóbili (5)	SBC Center; 18,797	40–17
58	March 2	@ Houston	W 97–88	Manu Ginóbili (20)	David Robinson (10)	Stephen Jackson (7)	Compaq Center; 16,285	41–17
59	March 4	Phoenix	L 97–104	Tim Duncan (35)	Tim Duncan (21)	Tony Parker (9)	SBC Center; 18,797	41–18
60	March 6	New Jersey	W 92–78	Duncan, Parker (21)	Tim Duncan (21)	Manu Ginóbili (7)	SBC Center; 18,797	42–18
61	March 9	@ Boston	W 94–78	Tim Duncan (18)	Rose, Duncan (8)	Tony Parker (7)	FleetCenter; 18,624	43–18
62	March 11	@ Milwaukee	W 105–102	Malik Rose (34)	Tim Duncan (15)	Tim Duncan (6)	Bradley Center; 17,401	44–18
63	March 12	@ Minnesota	W 111–99	Stephen Jackson (22)	Tim Duncan (14)	Rose, Parker (6)	Target Center; 15,309	45–18
64	March 14	L.A. Clippers	W 107–96	Tim Duncan (24)	Tim Duncan (15)	Tim Duncan (10)	SBC Center; 18,797	46–18
65	March 16	Chicago	W 108–97	Tony Parker (25)	Tim Duncan (12)	Tony Parker (8)	SBC Center; 18,797	47–18
66	March 18	New York	L 97–105	Tim Duncan (27)	Malik Rose (12)	Stephen Jackson (6)	SBC Center; 18,797	47–19
67	March 20	@ Dallas	W 112–110 (OT)	Tim Duncan (25)	Tim Duncan (18)	Bruce Bowen (7)	American Airlines Center; 20,110	48–19
68	March 21	Minnesota	L 94–101 (OT)	Tim Duncan (29)	Tim Duncan (12)	Tony Parker (7)	SBC Center; 18,797	48–20
69	March 23	L.A. Lakers	W 98–89	Tim Duncan (27)	Tim Duncan (17)	Stephen Jackson (4)	SBC Center; 18,797	49–20
70	March 25	Milwaukee	W 107–94	Tim Duncan (31)	Tim Duncan (10)	Speedy Claxton (11)	SBC Center; 18,797	50–20
71	March 27	Houston	W 98–85	Stephen Jackson (27)	Tim Duncan (14)	Tim Duncan (8)	SBC Center; 18,797	51–20
72	March 29	Utah	W 101–81	Tim Duncan (30)	Tim Duncan (8)	Tony Parker (7)	SBC Center; 18,797	52–20
73	March 30	@ New Orleans	W 92–90	Tim Duncan (33)	Tim Duncan (12)	Tony Parker (7)	New Orleans Arena; 17,357	53–20

April : 7–2 (home: 3–1; road: 4–1)

Game	Date	Team	Score	High points	High rebounds	High assists	Location Attendance	Record
74	April 1	Orlando	W 118–105	Tim Duncan (20)	Tim Duncan (7)	Bruce Bowen (7)	SBC Center; 18,797	54–20
75	April 2	@ Memphis	W 105–87	Tim Duncan (33)	Tim Duncan (19)	Tony Parker (6)	Pyramid Arena; 12,116	55–20
76	April 4	@ Toronto	W 124–98	Malik Rose (23)	Malik Rose (9)	Parker, Claxton (5)	Air Canada Centre; 18,376	56–20
77	April 6	@ Detroit	W 89–83	Tim Duncan (25)	Tim Duncan (21)	Tony Parker (6)	The Palace of Auburn Hills; 22,076	57–20
78	April 9	Portland	W 84–79	Manu Ginóbili (17)	Duncan, Jackson (11)	Tim Duncan (4)	SBC Center; 18,797	58–20
79	April 11	Seattle	W 94–86	Malik Rose (20)	Tim Duncan (15)	Tony Parker (5)	SBC Center; 19,217	59–20
80	April 13	@ Phoenix	L 85–92	Malik Rose (18)	Duncan, Robinson (7)	Duncan, Jackson (6)	America West Arena; 19,023	59–21
81	April 14	@ Utah	W 91–83	Tony Parker (25)	Tim Duncan (15)	Tim Duncan (9)	Delta Center; 19,821	60–21
82	April 16	Dallas	L 72–93	Steve Smith (11)	Robinson, Ferry (9)	Speedy Claxton (4)	SBC Center; 19,217	60–22

2002–03 schedule

== Playoffs ==
2003 playoff game log
First Round: 4–2 (home: 2–1; road: 2–1)

Game	Date	Team	Score	High points	High rebounds	High assists	Location Attendance	Series
1	April 19	Phoenix	L 95–96 (OT)	Stephen Jackson (23)	Tim Duncan (13)	Tony Parker (7)	SBC Center; 19,217	0–1
2	April 21	Phoenix	W 84–76	Stephen Jackson (23)	Tim Duncan (12)	Speedy Claxton (7)	SBC Center; 19,217	1–1
3	April 25	@ Phoenix	W 99–86	Tony Parker (29)	Tim Duncan (23)	Tim Duncan (6)	America West Arena; 19,023	2–1
4	April 27	@ Phoenix	L 84–86	Tim Duncan (24)	Tim Duncan (11)	Manu Ginóbili (5)	America West Arena; 18,756	2–2
5	April 29	Phoenix	W 94–82	Malik Rose (27)	Tim Duncan (17)	Tim Duncan (6)	SBC Center; 19,217	3–2
6	May 1	@ Phoenix	W 87–85	Stephen Jackson (21)	Tim Duncan (20)	Tim Duncan (10)	America West Arena; 18,913	4–2

Conference Semifinals: 4–2 (home: 3–0; road: 1–2)

Game	Date	Team	Score	High points	High rebounds	High assists	Location Attendance	Series
1	May 5	L.A. Lakers	W 87–82	Tim Duncan (28)	David Robinson (11)	Tim Duncan (7)	SBC Center; 18,797	1–0
2	May 7	L.A. Lakers	W 114–95	Bruce Bowen (27)	Tim Duncan (13)	Tim Duncan (7)	SBC Center; 18,797	2–0
3	May 9	@ L.A. Lakers	L 95–110	Tim Duncan (28)	Tim Duncan (11)	Jackson, Parker (4)	Staples Center; 18,997	2–1
4	May 11	@ L.A. Lakers	L 95–99	Tim Duncan (36)	Stephen Jackson (10)	Tim Duncan (5)	Staples Center; 18,997	2–2
5	May 13	L.A. Lakers	W 96–94	Tim Duncan (27)	Tim Duncan (14)	Tim Duncan (5)	SBC Center; 18,797	3–2
6	May 15	@ L.A. Lakers	W 110–82	Tim Duncan (37)	Tim Duncan (16)	Tony Parker (5)	Staples Center; 18,997	4–2

Conference Finals: 4–2 (home: 1–2; road: 3–0)

Game	Date	Team	Score	High points	High rebounds	High assists	Location Attendance	Series
1	May 19	Dallas	L 110–113	Tim Duncan (40)	Tim Duncan (15)	Tim Duncan (7)	SBC Center; 18,797	0–1
2	May 21	Dallas	W 119–106	Tim Duncan (32)	Tim Duncan (15)	Duncan, Jackson (5)	SBC Center; 18,797	1–1
3	May 23	@ Dallas	W 96–83	Tim Duncan (34)	Tim Duncan (24)	Tim Duncan (6)	American Airlines Center; 20,695	2–1
4	May 25	@ Dallas	W 102–95	Tony Parker (25)	Tim Duncan (20)	Tim Duncan (7)	American Airlines Center; 20,561	3–1
5	May 27	Dallas	L 91–103	Tim Duncan (23)	Tim Duncan (15)	three players tied (6)	SBC Center; 18,797	3–2
6	May 29	@ Dallas	W 90–78	Stephen Jackson (24)	Duncan, Rose (11)	three players tied (4)	American Airlines Center; 20,812	4–2

NBA Finals: 4–2 (home: 2–1; road: 2–1)

Game	Date	Team	Score	High points	High rebounds	High assists	Location Attendance	Series
1	June 4	New Jersey	W 101–89	Tim Duncan (32)	Tim Duncan (20)	Tim Duncan (6)	SBC Center; 18,797	1–0
2	June 6	New Jersey	L 85–87	Tony Parker (21)	Tim Duncan (12)	Tony Parker (5)	SBC Center; 18,797	1–1
3	June 8	@ New Jersey	W 84–79	Tony Parker (26)	Tim Duncan (16)	Tim Duncan (7)	Continental Airlines Arena; 19,280	2–1
4	June 11	@ New Jersey	L 76–77	Tim Duncan (23)	Tim Duncan (16)	Parker, Jackson (3)	Continental Airlines Arena; 19,280	2–2
5	June 13	@ New Jersey	W 93–83	Tim Duncan (29)	Tim Duncan (17)	Duncan, Parker (4)	Continental Airlines Arena; 19,280	3–2
6	June 15	New Jersey	W 88–77	Tim Duncan (21)	Tim Duncan (20)	Tim Duncan (10)	SBC Center; 18,797	4–2

2003 schedule

== Player statistics ==
=== Regular season ===
Player	POS	GP	GS	MP	REB	AST	STL	BLK	PTS	MPG	RPG	APG	SPG	BPG	PPG
Tony Parker	PG	82	82	2,774	216	432	71	4	1,269	33.8	2.6	5.3	.9	.0	15.5
Bruce Bowen	SF	82	82	2,566	239	113	66	42	583	31.3	2.9	1.4	.8	.5	7.1
Tim Duncan	PF	81	81	3,181	1,043	316	55	237	1,884	39.3	12.9	3.9	.7	2.9	23.3
Stephen Jackson	SG	80	58	2,254	286	183	125	30	946	28.2	3.6	2.3	1.6	.4	11.8
Malik Rose	PF	79	13	1,933	506	124	57	40	822	24.5	6.4	1.6	.7	.5	10.4
Steve Kerr	PG	75	0	952	60	70	27	3	299	12.7	.8	.9	.4	.0	4.0
Kevin Willis	C	71	6	840	226	24	20	20	297	11.8	3.2	.3	.3	.3	4.2
Manu Ginóbili	SG	69	5	1,431	161	138	96	17	525	20.7	2.3	2.0	1.4	.2	7.6
David Robinson	C	64	64	1,676	508	61	52	111	546	26.2	7.9	1.0	.8	1.7	8.5
Danny Ferry	SF	64	1	601	75	21	7	9	119	9.4	1.2	.3	.1	.1	1.9
Steve Smith	SG	53	18	1,032	99	70	28	9	360	19.5	1.9	1.3	.5	.2	6.8
Speedy Claxton	PG	30	0	471	56	75	22	7	173	15.7	1.9	2.5	.7	.2	5.8
Mengke Bateer	C	12	0	46	10	4	0	0	9	3.8	.8	.3	.0	.0	.8
Anthony Goldwire^{†}	PG	10	0	51	3	3	3	0	12	5.1	.3	.3	.3	.0	1.2
Devin Brown^{†}	SG	7	0	22	7	2	0	0	12	3.1	1.0	.3	.0	.0	1.7

- ^{†} Denotes player spent time with another team in the season. Stats reflect time with the Spurs only.

=== Playoffs ===
Player	POS	GP	GS	MP	REB	AST	STL	BLK	PTS	MPG	RPG	APG	SPG	BPG	PPG
Tim Duncan	PF	24	24	1,021	369	127	15	79	593	42.5	15.4	5.3	.6	3.3	24.7
Tony Parker	PG	24	24	814	66	85	22	3	352	33.9	2.8	3.5	.9	.1	14.7
Stephen Jackson	SG	24	24	811	98	65	33	9	307	33.8	4.1	2.7	1.4	.4	12.8
Bruce Bowen	SF	24	24	750	69	39	20	17	166	31.3	2.9	1.6	.8	.7	6.9
Manu Ginóbili	SG	24	0	660	92	70	41	9	226	27.5	3.8	2.9	1.7	.4	9.4
Malik Rose	PF	24	0	560	138	24	16	11	222	23.3	5.8	1.0	.7	.5	9.3
Speedy Claxton	PG	24	0	326	45	45	16	5	125	13.6	1.9	1.9	.7	.2	5.2
David Robinson	C	23	23	539	152	21	18	31	180	23.4	6.6	.9	.8	1.3	7.8
Kevin Willis	C	18	0	91	31	2	1	1	46	5.1	1.7	.1	.1	.1	2.6
Danny Ferry	SF	16	1	101	23	7	2	0	20	6.3	1.4	.4	.1	.0	1.3
Steve Kerr	PG	10	0	46	3	6	1	0	22	4.6	.3	.6	.1	.0	2.2
Steve Smith	SG	9	0	66	7	6	1	0	16	7.3	.8	.7	.1	.0	1.8

== NBA Finals ==
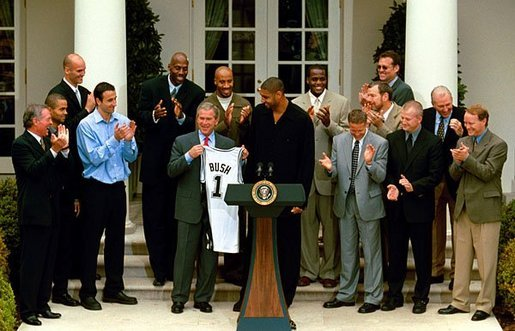
The Spurs visit the White House after their championship in 2003.

=== Summary ===
The following scoring summary is written in a line score format, except that the quarter numbers are replaced by game numbers.

Team	Game 1	Game 2	Game 3	Game 4	Game 5	Game 6	Wins
San Antonio (West)	90	65	84	66	84	80	4
New Jersey (East)	89	87	79	77	83	77	2

=== Schedule ===
- Game 1 – June 4: Wednesday 8:00pm EST @San Antonio San Antonio 90, New Jersey 89: San Antonio leads series 1–0
- Game 2 – June 6: Friday 8:00pm EST @San Antonio New Jersey 87, San Antonio 65: Series tied 1–1
- Game 3 – June 8: Sunday 8:00pm EST @New Jersey San Antonio 84, New Jersey 79: San Antonio leads series 2–1
- Game 4 – June 11: Wednesday 8:00pm EST @New Jersey New Jersey 77, San Antonio 66: Series tied 2–2
- Game 5 – June 13: Friday 8:00pm EST @New Jersey San Antonio 84, New Jersey 83: San Antonio leads series 3–2
- Game 6 – June 15 Sunday 8:00pm EST @San Antonio San Antonio 80, New Jersey 77: San Antonio wins series 4–2

== Award winners ==
- Tim Duncan, NBA Most Valuable Player Award
- Tim Duncan, NBA Finals Most Valuable Player Award
- Gregg Popovich, NBA Coach of the Year Award
- Tim Duncan, All-NBA First Team
- Tim Duncan, NBA All-Defensive First Team
- Bruce Bowen, NBA All-Defensive Second Team
- Manu Ginóbili, NBA All-Rookie Second Team

== Transactions ==
=== Overview ===
Players Added

Via draft

Via trade

- Speedy Claxton
- Steve Kerr

Via free agency

- Mengke Bateer
- Kevin Willis
Players Lost

Via trade

- Mark Bryant
- Antonio Daniels
- Amal McCaskill

Via free agency

- Cherokee Parks

Player Transactions Citation:
