= Brad Miller (basketball) =

American basketball player (born 1976)

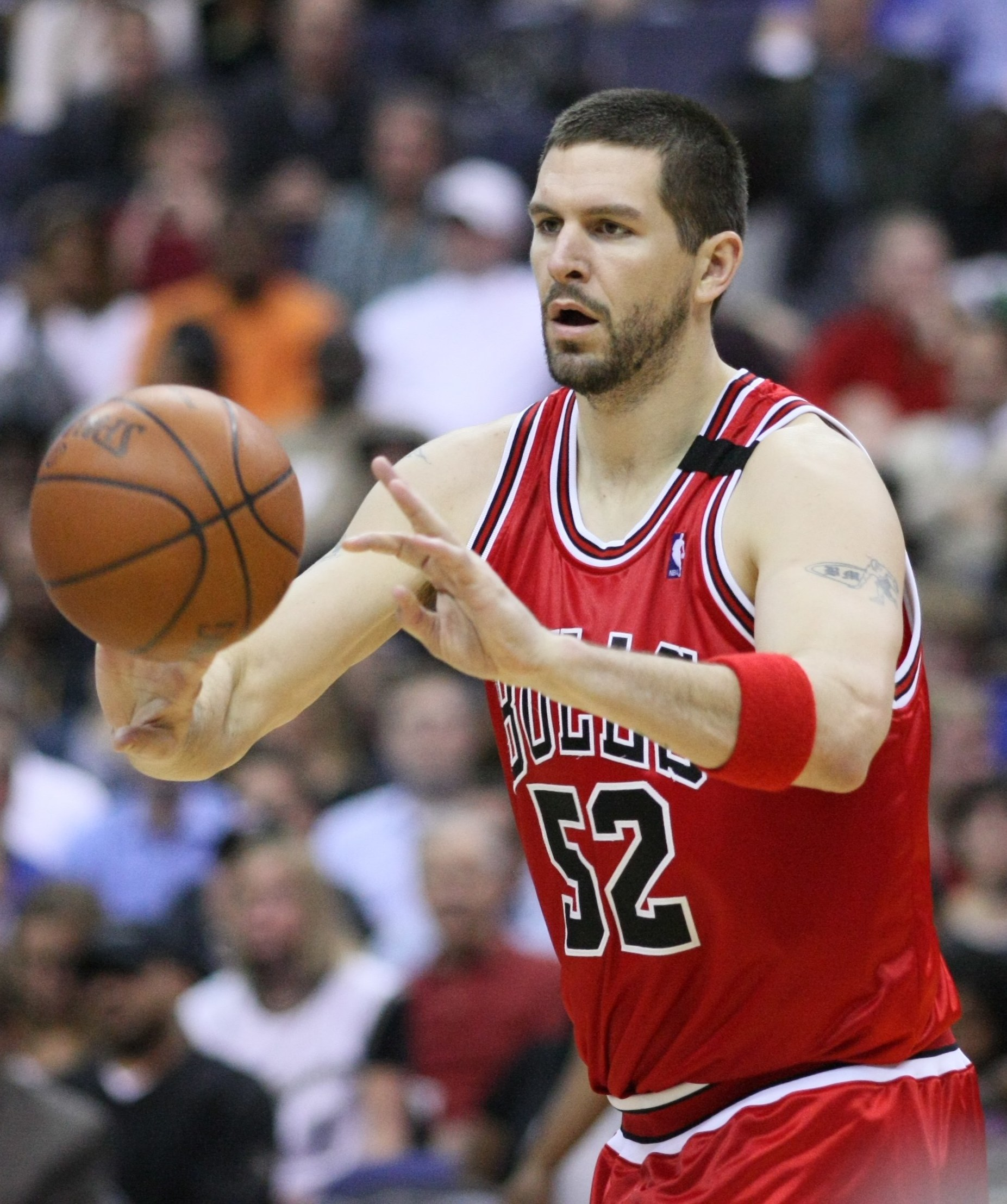
- Miller with the Chicago Bulls in 2009

Personal information
- Born: April 12, 1976 (age 50) Kendallville, Indiana, U.S.
- Listed height: 7 ft 0 in (2.13 m)
- Listed weight: 261 lb (118 kg)

Career information
- High school: East Noble (Kendallville, Indiana); Maine Central Institute (Pittsfield, Maine)
- College: Purdue (1994–1998)
- NBA draft: 1998: undrafted
- Playing career: 1998–2012
- Position: Center
- Number: 40, 52

Career history
- 1998: Bini Viaggi Livorno
- 1999–2000: Charlotte Hornets
- 2000–2002: Chicago Bulls
- 2002–2003: Indiana Pacers
- 2003–2009: Sacramento Kings
- 2009–2010: Chicago Bulls
- 2010–2011: Houston Rockets
- 2011–2012: Minnesota Timberwolves

Career highlights
- 2× NBA All-Star (2003, 2004)

Career statistics
- Points: 9,724 (11.2 ppg)
- Rebounds: 6,199 (7.1 rpg)
- Assists: 2,137 (2.8 apg)
- Stats at NBA.com
- Stats at Basketball Reference
Medals
Representing United States
World Championships
Bronze medal – third place	1998 Athens	USA
Bronze medal – third place	2006 Japan	USA

Bradley Alan Miller (born April 12, 1976) is an American former professional basketball player. The two-time NBA All-Star played for six National Basketball Association (NBA) teams. Miller played college basketball for the Purdue Boilermakers but went undrafted.

== College career ==
After playing prep school basketball for a season at Maine Central Institute (MCI), Miller returned to his home state to attend Purdue University, located in West Lafayette, Indiana, where he played under head coach Gene Keady and assistant coaches Bruce Weber and Frank Kendrick. During his freshman season, along with senior Cuonzo Martin, he led the Boilermakers to a 25–7 record. Along the way, he was part of a Big Ten Conference Title and an NCAA Second Round appearance. He averaged 6.5 points and 5.4 rebounds a game.

During his sophomore season, Miller helped lead Purdue, along with fellow sophomore Chad Austin, to a three-peat conference title and a consecutive NCAA Second Round appearance. The Boilers finished the season with a 26–6 overall record. Miller averaged 9.6 points and 5.5 rebounds on the season.

Miller's junior season showed more progress than the prior season, averaging 14.3 points and 8.3 rebounds a game. Finishing second in the conference, Miller, along with teammate and former NBA player Brian Cardinal, helped the Boilers to a third straight NCAA Second Round finish. They beat Rhode Island in overtime, where Brad scored 31 points, grabbed eight rebounds and set a school tournament record with made/attempted free throws, going 15–21 from the line. He finished his junior season with an 18–12 record. Throughout his junior year, Miller became the only center in Purdue history to lead the team in assists.

Miller had his best college season during his senior year, helping with a 28–8 record. Averaging 17.2 points and 8.8 rebounds in his last season at Purdue, he led the Boilermakers to a Sweet Sixteen appearance and a 2nd overall seed in the NCAA Tournament. Miller set a school tournament record with 6 steals in a win against Delaware. His last collegiate game was a loss to Stanford. Miller's biggest game of his senior season came against Michigan State, where he scored 30 points and pulled down 12 rebounds to force Michigan State to share their Big Ten crown.

During his career at Purdue, Miller became one of only six players (Joe Barry Carroll, Terry Dischinger, Walter Jordan, Robbie Hummel, and Zach Edey) to record 800 rebounds and the first player in school history to have 1,500 points, 800 rebounds, and 250 assists.

== Professional career ==
=== Livorno (1998) ===
After college, because of the NBA lockout, Miller started his career in the Italian Serie A with Bini Viaggi Livorno for three months.

=== Charlotte Hornets (1999–2000) ===
Miller was then signed by the Charlotte Hornets as an undrafted free agent in 1999. He played for the Hornets for two seasons. On March 24, 1999, he had 25 points, going 9–9 shooting and 7–7 from the line. On May 5, 1999, scored a season high 32 points to go along with 13 rebounds in a win against the Boston Celtics. The Hornets made it to the playoffs the following season where they lost 1–3 to the Philadelphia 76ers. In his first playoff series, Miller averaged 7.5 points on 52 percent shooting.

=== Chicago Bulls (2000–2002) ===
After two seasons with the Hornets, Miller signed with the Chicago Bulls as a free agent. In January 2002, he was involved in an on-court altercation with center Shaquille O'Neal of the Los Angeles Lakers. After he and Charles Oakley gave a hard foul on O'Neal, Miller walked away as O'Neal swung at the back of his head; O'Neal would be suspended three games. Nearly doubling his playing time with the Bulls, he averaged 12.7 points a game, shooting 46 percent during the 2001–02 season.

=== Indiana Pacers (2002–2003) ===
In February 2002, Miller was traded by the Bulls with Ron Mercer, Ron Artest (now Metta Sandiford-Artest) and Kevin Ollie to the Indiana Pacers for Jalen Rose, Travis Best, Norman Richardson, and a second-round draft pick. He wrapped up the 2001–02 season with a 15.1 points and 8.2 rebounds per game average. During his first and only complete season with the Pacers, he made his first NBA All-Star Team becoming one of the first undrafted players to be named an All-Star along with the Detroit Pistons' Ben Wallace the same year. The Pacers clinched a playoff berth for the 6th season in a row, where they lost to the Celtics, 4–2.

=== Sacramento Kings (2003–2009) ===
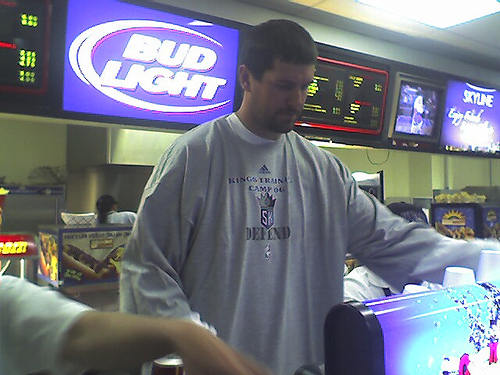
Brad Miller in 2006

During the 2003 offseason, Miller was involved in a sign-and-trade with the Sacramento Kings. He was signed to a multi-year deal by Indiana and then traded to the Kings in exchange for Scot Pollard. In the same trade, the Kings sent Hedo Türkoğlu to San Antonio Spurs, San Antonio traded Danny Ferry to Indiana and Indiana traded Ron Mercer to San Antonio. While signing with the Kings, Miller stated, "I wanted to stay with Indiana but my agent said that the money I could make with Sacramento was just too good to pass up and I would never get this kind of contract again." On November 21, 2003, Miller recorded his first career triple-double with 22 points, 14 rebounds, and 10 assists in a win over the Orlando Magic. Less than a month later, Miller recorded another triple-double with 18 points, 15 rebounds and 10 assists. Averaging 14.1 points and 10.3 rebounds in his first season with the Kings, he was voted to back-to-back NBA All-Star Game appearances. In the playoffs, Sacramento lost the Western Conference Semifinals 4–3 to the Minnesota Timberwolves.

Miller appeared in only 56 games during his second season in Sacramento, yet averaging his career high of 15.6 points a game. On February 2, 2005, Miller scored a career-high 38 points to go along with 17 rebounds in a win over the Golden State Warriors. Two days later scored his first back-to-back 30 points game with 35 against the New York Knicks. In the playoffs, Miller averaged a career-high 11.2 points but the Kings lost 4–1 to the Seattle SuperSonics in the first round. In middle of the 2005–06 season, he became the first center since Sam Lacey in 1981 to record back-to-back double-doubles in both points and assists. After a career best 1,182 points scored during the season, the following 2006–07 season brought lower averages and totals of the previous five years. On April 10, 2007, Miller recorded his third career triple-double with 17 points, 10 rebounds and a career-high 11 assist.

On January 14, 2009, Miller recorded his first 30/20 game with 30 points and a career-high 22 rebounds in a win over the Golden State Warriors. He finished his five and a half seasons with the Kings averaging just over 13 points, 8 rebounds, and 4 assists a game.

=== Return to Chicago (2009–2010) ===
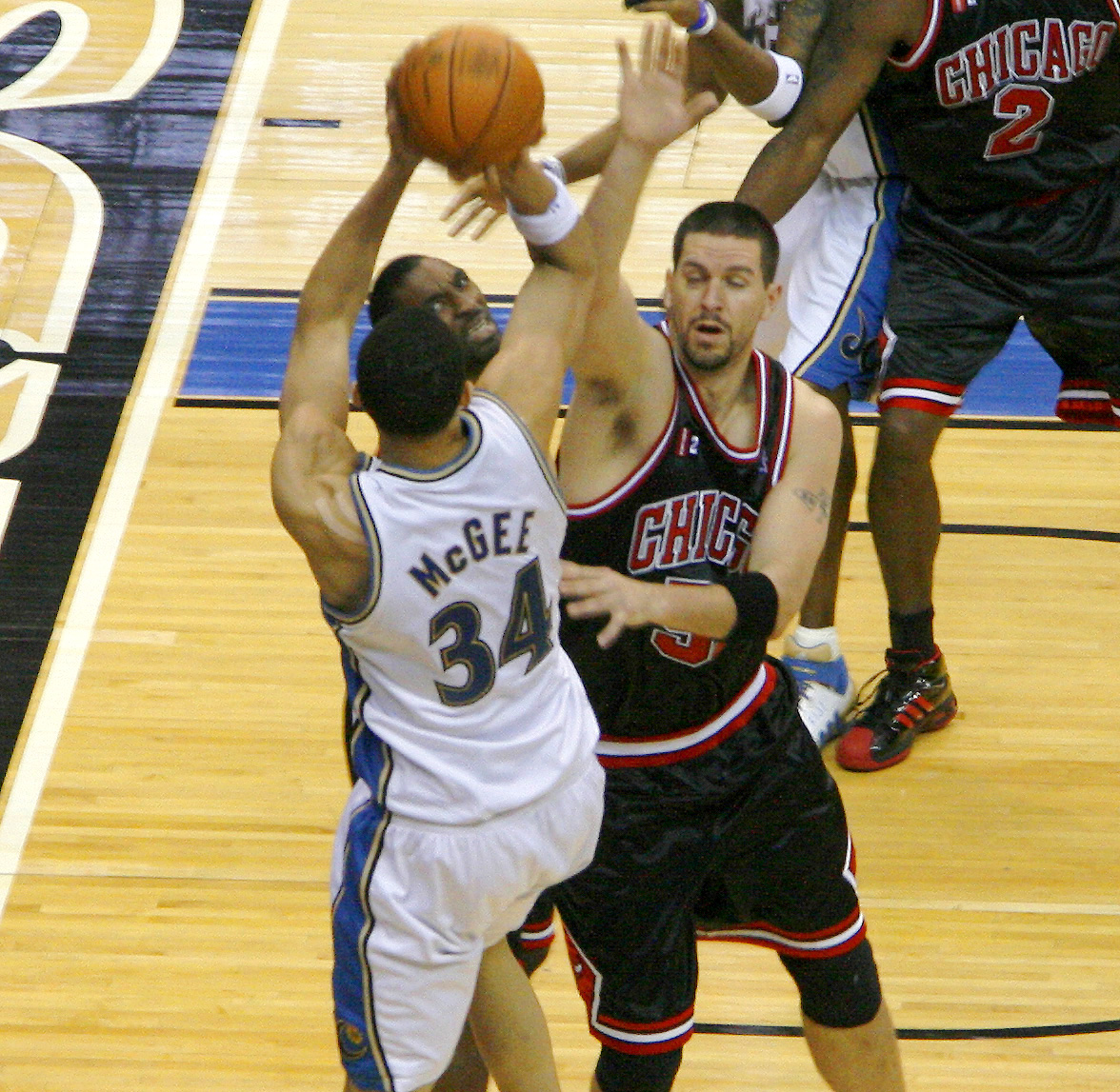
Miller with the Bulls in 2009

On February 18, 2009, the Kings reached a tentative agreement to trade Miller and John Salmons to the Chicago Bulls for Drew Gooden, Andrés Nocioni, Michael Ruffin (later traded to Portland Trail Blazers for Ike Diogu) and Cedric Simmons. As a veteran presence on a young team, Miller added depth in the paint with forward/center Joakim Noah to compete in the 2009 NBA Playoffs after a two-year absence of postseason play while with the Kings. On April 28, Miller received a busted lip by Boston Celtics guard Rajon Rondo, and missed game-decisive free-throws at the end of game 5 of the Eastern Conference First Round. During game six of the 7-overtime series and after receiving 7 stitches for his lip, he posted a double-double with 23 points and 10 rebounds, shooting 8 for 9 from the floor. Miller averaged 10.3 points, 7.9 rebounds, and 1.3 assists during the seven-game series in the 2009 Playoffs. He made 5 of 7 three point field goals (71.4%) and shot 79.2 percent from the free throw line.

=== Houston Rockets (2010–2011) ===
On July 17, 2010, Miller signed a three-year contract with the Houston Rockets, worth $15 million. He was expected to back up Yao Ming and provide the Rockets a valuable insurance policy. On November 12, 2010, in Miller's first start after coming to the Rockets, he scored 23 points, grabbed 8 rebounds, and gave out 5 assists. On December 3, 2010, Miller tied his season-high 23 points, going a perfect 7-7 from the field, including 3-3 from downtown, and 6-7 from the foul line.

=== Minnesota Timberwolves (2011–2012) ===
During the 2011 NBA draft, Miller was traded to the Minnesota Timberwolves, along with the rights of Nikola Mirotić, in a deal that sent the rights of Donatas Motiejunas and Jonny Flynn to Houston. Due to microfracture knee surgery on his left knee while a member of the Rockets in May 2011, he was doubtful to begin playing for the Wolves at the projected start of the 2011–12 season (which was delayed due to the owners' lockout) - or indeed at all.

On January 12, 2012, Miller practiced with the team for the first time, strictly in half-court situations to protect his knee. He made his debut with the team on January 29. In an interview with Yahoo! Sports, he announced that the 2011–2012 season would be his final season. After the season, however, Miller's agent said that Miller was undecided about retiring.

On July 13, 2012, Miller was traded to the New Orleans Hornets, then traded to the Phoenix Suns as part of a three-team deal on July 27. He was waived by the Suns on August 15, when the team signed Jermaine O'Neal. Miller later reaffirmed his decision to retire.

== Coaching career ==
On September 22, 2025, it was announced that Millers would join California State University, Sacramento as an advisor for head coach Mike Bibby.

== National team career ==
Shortly after finishing his college career, Brad joined the US national team in the 1998 FIBA World Championship. During the time of the NBA lockout, there were no players from the league on the team. With fellow former Purdue standout Jimmy Oliver, Miller led the USA team to the bronze medal. He played under NBA coach Rudy Tomjanovich.

Miller was selected as a member of the U.S. squad that competed in the 2006 FIBA World Championship, where he played along with fellow NBA players, such as LeBron James, Carmelo Anthony and Dwight Howard. After much hype over the improvement of the team, the tournament ended in disappointment with a loss to Greece in the semifinal game. The team finished with the bronze medal by defeating Argentina. Despite pre-tournament assertions that the U.S. needed a good-shooting big man like Miller, he rarely played in the tournament and did not log any playing time in the decisive semifinal loss. The team was coached by Duke's head coach Mike Krzyzewski.

== Career notes ==
Despite his size, Miller did not fit the mold of a traditional center. He only averaged double-digit rebounds once in his career and never averaged more than 1.2 blocks per season.

In 2005–2006, Miller averaged 4.7 assists per game, good for 29th in the league but far above what other centers averaged (Ben Wallace was second among centers with 1.9 APG). The Princeton offense run by the Kings both allowed and demanded Miller to be a good passer, and he was typically recognized as one of the best-passing big men in the league. Miller also added a three-point shot to his game.

== NBA career statistics ==
Legend
GP	Games played	GS	Games started	MPG	Minutes per game
FG%	Field goal percentage	3P%	3-point field goal percentage	FT%	Free throw percentage
RPG	Rebounds per game	APG	Assists per game	SPG	Steals per game
BPG	Blocks per game	PPG	Points per game	**Bold**	Career high
*	Led the league

=== Regular season ===
Year	Team	GP	GS	MPG	FG%	3P%	FT%	RPG	APG	SPG	BPG	PPG
1998–99	Charlotte	38	0	12.3	**.565**	**.500**	.794	3.1	.6	.2	.5	6.3
1999–00	Charlotte	55	4	17.5	.461	.000	.785	5.3	.8	.4	.6	7.7
2000–01	Chicago	57	45	25.2	.435	.200	.743	7.4	1.9	.6	.7	8.9
2001–02	Chicago	48	47	29.0	.460	**.500**	.751	8.4	2.1	1.1	.6	12.7
2001–02	Indiana	28	28	31.1	.562	.333	.823	7.9	1.8	.9	.4	15.1
2002–03	Indiana	73	72	31.1	.493	.313	.818	8.3	2.6	.9	.6	13.1
2003–04	Sacramento	72	53	36.4	.510	.316	.778	**10.3**	4.3	.9	**1.2**	14.1
2004–05	Sacramento	56	56	**37.3**	.524	.263	.812	9.3	3.9	**1.2**	**1.2**	**15.6**
2005–06	Sacramento	79	**79**	37.0	.495	.386	.828	7.8	**4.7**	.8	.8	15.0
2006–07	Sacramento	63	56	28.3	.453	.152	.772	6.4	3.6	.6	.6	9.0
2007–08	Sacramento	72	72	34.9	.463	.311	.848	9.5	3.7	1.0	1.0	13.4
2008–09	Sacramento	43	43	31.5	.474	.465	.801	8.0	3.4	.7	.6	11.9
2008–09	Chicago	27	0	27.6	.478	.231	**.853**	7.4	3.2	.8	.4	11.8
2009–10	Chicago	**82***	37	23.8	.430	.280	.827	4.9	1.9	.5	.4	8.8
2010–11	Houston	60	5	16.9	.446	.374	.830	3.7	2.4	.5	.4	6.4
2011–12	Minnesota	15	1	9.7	.333	.467	.833	1.3	1.6	.3	.1	2.3
Career		868	598	28.3	.480	.330	.804	7.1	2.8	.7	.7	11.2
All-Star		2	0	13.5	.667	.000	.500	4.5	1.5	.0	.0	6.5

=== Playoffs ===
Year	Team	GP	GS	MPG	FG%	3P%	FT%	RPG	APG	SPG	BPG	PPG
2000	Charlotte	4	0	15.5	.529	.000	.800	3.3	.8	.0	.8	7.5
2002	Indiana	5	5	**36.0**	.455	.000	.800	**9.8**	1.4	.8	.4	**11.2**
2003	Indiana	6	**6**	22.5	.450	.000	.727	5.5	2.5	.8	.0	8.7
2004	Sacramento	**12**	0	30.5	.527	.143	.604	8.7	**3.2**	.8	**.9**	10.5
2005	Sacramento	5	4	27.8	**.575**	.000	.714	3.8	**3.2**	.2	.6	**11.2**
2006	Sacramento	6	**6**	27.7	.404	.143	.923	3.0	2.5	**1.2**	.8	9.2
2009	Chicago	7	0	26.6	.471	**.714**	.792	7.9	1.3	.3	**.9**	10.3
2010	Chicago	5	0	18.6	.370	.000	**1.000**	3.6	.8	.0	.2	5.4
Career		50	21	26.6	.478	.259	.742	6.2	2.1	.6	.6	9.5
