= 2002–03 Dallas Mavericks season =

Mavericks' 23rd NBA season

- Head coach: Don Nelson
- President: Donnie Nelson
- General manager: Don Nelson
- Owner: Mark Cuban
- Arena: American Airlines Center

Results
- Record: 60–22 (.732)
- Place: Division: 2nd (Midwest); Conference: 3rd (Western)
- Playoff finish: Western Conference finals (lost to Spurs 2–4)
- Stats at Basketball Reference

Local media
- Television: Fox Sports Net Southwest; KTXA; KTVT
- Radio: KESN

The 2002–03 Dallas Mavericks season was the 23rd season for the Dallas Mavericks in the National Basketball Association.

== Season summary ==
=== Off-season ===
During the off-season, the Mavericks signed free agents Walt Williams, and Raja Bell.

=== Regular season ===
The Mavericks got off to a fast start by winning their first fourteen games of the regular season; the team defeated the Detroit Pistons on the road, 102–82 at The Palace of Auburn Hills on November 27, 2002, to extend their winning streak to fourteen games, which was one win short of tying the NBA record set by the 1948–49 Washington Capitols, and the 1993–94 Houston Rockets, who both won their first fifteen games of the regular season. However, the team's winning streak ended after losing to the Indiana Pacers on the road, 110–98 at the Conseco Fieldhouse on November 28. The Mavericks later on held a 38–10 record at the All-Star break, finished in second place in the Midwest Division with a 60–22 record, and earned the third seed in the Western Conference; the Mavericks lost the tie-breaker with the San Antonio Spurs for the Midwest Division title.

Dirk Nowitzki averaged 25.1 points, 9.9 rebounds and 1.4 steals per game, led the Mavericks with 148 three-point field goals, and was named to the All-NBA Second Team, while Michael Finley averaged 19.3 points and 5.8 rebounds per game, along with 119 three-point field goals, and Steve Nash provided the team with 17.7 points and 7.3 assists per game, contributed 111 three-point field goals, and was named to the All-NBA Third Team. In addition, sixth man Nick Van Exel contributed 12.5 points and 4.3 assists per game, along with 118 three-point field goals off the bench, while Raef LaFrentz provided with 9.3 points, 4.8 rebounds and 1.3 blocks per game, and Shawn Bradley averaged 6.7 points, 5.9 rebounds and 2.1 blocks per game. Meanwhile, Eduardo Nájera averaged 6.7 points and 4.6 rebounds per game, but only played just 48 games, Williams contributed 5.5 points per game, Adrian Griffin provided with 4.4 points per game, and Bell contributed 3.1 points per game.

During the NBA All-Star weekend at the Philips Arena in Atlanta, Georgia, Nowitzki and Nash were both selected for the 2003 NBA All-Star Game, as members of the Western Conference All-Star team. Nowitzki finished in seventh place in Most Valuable Player voting, while Nash finished tied in eleventh place; Nowitzki also finished tied in 14th place in Most Improved Player voting, while Nash finished tied in 26th place, Van Exel finished in fourth place in Sixth Man of the Year voting, and head coach Don Nelson finished in eighth place in Coach of the Year voting.

The Mavericks finished third in the NBA in home-game attendance, with an attendance of 816,429 at the American Airlines Center during the regular season.

=== NBA playoffs ===
In the Western Conference First Round of the 2003 NBA playoffs, the Mavericks faced off against the 6th–seeded Portland Trail Blazers, a team that featured Rasheed Wallace, Bonzi Wells and Derek Anderson. The Mavericks won the first two games over the Trail Blazers at home at the American Airlines Center, before winning Game 3 on the road, 115–103 at the Rose Garden Arena to take a 3–0 series lead. However, the Mavericks lost the next three games, which included a Game 6 loss to the Trail Blazers at the Rose Garden Arena, 125–103. With the series tied at 3–3, the Mavericks won Game 7 over the Trail Blazers at the American Airlines Center, 107–95 to win in a hard-fought seven-game series.

In the Western Conference Semi-finals, and for the second consecutive year, the team faced off against the 2nd–seeded, and Pacific Division champion Sacramento Kings, who were led by the trio of All-Star forward Chris Webber, All-Star forward Peja Stojaković, and Mike Bibby. The Mavericks lost Game 1 to the Kings at the American Airlines Center, 124–113, but managed to win Game 2 at home, 132–110, in which the Kings lost Webber to a season-ending knee injury. The Mavericks won Game 3 over the Kings on the road in double-overtime, 141–137 at the ARCO Arena II, as Van Exel scored 40 points off the bench to help the Mavericks take a 2–1 series lead. After holding a 3–2 series lead, the Mavericks lost Game 6 at the ARCO Arena II, 115–109 as the Kings evened the series. The Mavericks won Game 7 over the Kings at the American Airlines Center, 112–99 to win in another hard-fought seven-game series, and advance to the Conference Finals for the first time since the 1987–88 season.

In the Western Conference Finals, the Mavericks then faced off against the top–seeded, and Midwest Division champion Spurs, who were led by the trio of All-Star forward, and Most Valuable Player of the Year, Tim Duncan, second-year star Tony Parker, and David Robinson. The Mavericks won Game 1 over the Spurs, 113–110 at the SBC Center, but then lost Game 2 on the road, 119–106. In Game 3 at the American Airlines Center, Nowitzki suffered a season-ending knee injury, as the Mavericks lost to the Spurs, 96–83, and then lost Game 4 at home, 102–95. The Mavericks managed to win Game 5 at the SBC Center, 103–91, but then lost Game 6 to the Spurs at the American Airlines Center, 90–78, thus losing the series in six games.

The Spurs would go on to defeat the New Jersey Nets in six games in the 2003 NBA Finals, winning their second NBA championship in franchise history.

=== Aftermath ===
Following the season, Van Exel and Avery Johnson were both traded to the Golden State Warriors, while LaFrentz was traded to the Boston Celtics. Meanwhile, Griffin signed as a free agent with the Houston Rockets, Bell signed with the Utah Jazz, and Williams retired.

== Offseason ==
=== Draft picks ===
Round	Pick	Player	Position	Nationality	College
2	54	Mladen Šekularac	SF	Montenegro	

== Roster ==
2002–03 Dallas Mavericks roster
Players

Pos.	No.	Player	Height	Weight	DOB	From
G	9	Tariq Abdul-Wahad	6 ft 6 in (1.98 m)	223 lb (101 kg)	1973–11–03	San José State
G	11	Raja Bell	6 ft 5 in (1.96 m)	204 lb (93 kg)	1976–09–19	FIU
C	44	Shawn Bradley	7 ft 6 in (2.29 m)	235 lb (107 kg)	1972–03–22	BYU
C	42	Evan Eschmeyer	6 ft 11 in (2.11 m)	255 lb (116 kg)	1975–05–30	Northwestern
F	4	Michael Finley	6 ft 7 in (2.01 m)	225 lb (102 kg)	1973–03–06	Wisconsin
G	7	Adrian Griffin	6 ft 5 in (1.96 m)	217 lb (98 kg)	1974–07–04	Seton Hall
G	6	Avery Johnson	5 ft 10 in (1.78 m)	175 lb (79 kg)	1965–03–25	Southern
F	54	Popeye Jones	6 ft 8 in (2.03 m)	250 lb (113 kg)	1970–06–17	Murray State
C	45	Raef LaFrentz	7 ft 0 in (2.13 m)	240 lb (109 kg)	1976–05–29	Kansas
F	14	Eduardo Nájera	6 ft 8 in (2.03 m)	235 lb (107 kg)	1976–07–11	Oklahoma
G	13	Steve Nash	6 ft 3 in (1.91 m)	180 lb (82 kg)	1974–02–07	Santa Clara
F	41	Dirk Nowitzki	7 ft 0 in (2.13 m)	245 lb (111 kg)	1978–06–19	Germany
G	17	Antoine Rigaudeau	6 ft 7 in (2.01 m)	210 lb (95 kg)	1971–12–17	France
G	31	Nick Van Exel	6 ft 1 in (1.85 m)	170 lb (77 kg)	1971–11–27	Cincinnati
F	43	Walt Williams	6 ft 8 in (2.03 m)	219 lb (99 kg)	1970–04–16	Maryland

Coaches
Head coach
- Don Nelson
Assistant(s)
- Rolando Blackman
- Brad Davis (player development)
- Del Harris
- Sidney Moncrief
- Donnie Nelson
- Charlie Parker
- Larry Riley

Legend
- (DP) Unsigned draft pick
- (FA) Free agent
- (S) Suspended
- Injured

Roster
Updated: January 17, 2003

=== Roster Notes ===
- Center Shawn Bradley also holds American citizenship, but he played for the German national team and was born in Germany.

== Regular season ==
=== Season standings ===
Midwest Division	W	L	PCT	GB	Home	Road	Div
y-San Antonio Spurs	60	22	.732	–	33–8	27–14	17–7
x-Dallas Mavericks	60	22	.732	–	33–8	27–14	18–6
x-Minnesota Timberwolves	51	31	.622	9	33–8	18–23	15–9
x-Utah Jazz	47	35	.573	13	29–12	18–23	15–9
e-Houston Rockets	43	39	.524	17	28–13	15–26	11–13
e-Memphis Grizzlies	28	54	.341	32	20–21	8–33	5–17
e-Denver Nuggets	17	65	.207	43	13–28	4–37	3–21

#	Western Conference				
#	Team	W	L	PCT	GB
1	z-San Antonio Spurs	60	22	.732	–
2	y-Sacramento Kings	59	23	.720	1
3	x-Dallas Mavericks	60	22	.732	–
4	x-Minnesota Timberwolves	51	31	.622	9
5	x-Los Angeles Lakers	50	32	.610	10
6	x-Portland Trail Blazers	50	32	.610	10
7	x-Utah Jazz	47	35	.573	13
8	x-Phoenix Suns	44	38	.537	16
9	e-Houston Rockets	43	39	.524	17
10	e-Seattle SuperSonics	40	42	.488	20
11	e-Golden State Warriors	38	44	.463	22
12	e-Memphis Grizzlies	28	54	.341	32
13	e-Los Angeles Clippers	27	55	.329	33
14	e-Denver Nuggets	17	65	.207	43

z – clinched division title
y – clinched division title
x – clinched playoff spot

=== Game log ===
2002–03 game log
Total: 60–22 (home: 33–8; road: 27–14)
October: 1–0 (home: 0–0; road: 1–0)

Game	Date	Team	Score	High points	High rebounds	High assists	Location Attendance	Record
1	October 30	@ Memphis	W 119–108	Steve Nash (24)	Dirk Nowitzki (11)	Steve Nash (13)	Pyramid Arena; 16,638	1–0

November : 14–1 (home: 8–0; road: 6–1)

Game	Date	Team	Score	High points	High rebounds	High assists	Location Attendance	Record
2	November 2	Phoenix	W 97–83	Dirk Nowitzki (22)	Shawn Bradley (8)	Steve Nash (8)	American Airlines Center; 19,783	2–0
3	November 4	Golden State	W 107–100	Steve Nash (30)	Dirk Nowitzki (13)	Steve Nash (5)	American Airlines Center; 19,368	3–0
4	November 6	@ Toronto	W 106–92	Dirk Nowitzki (28)	Nowitzki, Bradley (13)	Steve Nash (6)	Air Canada Centre; 19,800	4–0
5	November 8	@ Chicago	W 114–87	Dirk Nowitzki (24)	Bradley, Williams (11)	Steve Nash (6)	United Center; 21,028	5–0
6	November 9	Detroit	W 114–75	Michael Finley (25)	Dirk Nowitzki (8)	Steve Nash (10)	American Airlines Center; 19,644	6–0
7	November 11	Portland	W 82–73	Dirk Nowitzki (26)	Shawn Bradley (18)	Steve Nash (7)	American Airlines Center; 19,548	7–0
8	November 13	@ Cleveland	W 103–99	Michael Finley (26)	Dirk Nowitzki (12)	Steve Nash (7)	Gund Arena; 12,764	8–0
9	November 15	@ Boston	W 97–86	Dirk Nowitzki (32)	Dirk Nowitzki (9)	Steve Nash (9)	FleetCenter; 18,624	9–0
10	November 16	@ New Jersey	W 96–88	Steve Nash (30)	Michael Finley (13)	Steve Nash (9)	Continental Airlines Arena; 16,634	10–0
12	November 19	L.A. Lakers	W 98–72	Steve Nash (21)	Dirk Nowitzki (17)	Steve Nash (6)	American Airlines Center; 20,096	11–0
12	November 21	Houston	W 103–90	Michael Finley (28)	Eduardo Nájera (11)	Steve Nash (8)	American Airlines Center; 19,853	12–0
13	November 23	Seattle	W 115–105	Finley, Nowitzki (29)	Michael Finley (11)	Steve Nash (8)	American Airlines Center; 20,011	13–0
14	November 27	@ Detroit	W 102–82	Michael Finley (42)	Dirk Nowitzki (15)	Steve Nash (7)	The Palace of Auburn Hills; 22,076	14–0
15	November 28	@ Indiana	L 98–110	Steve Nash (29)	Dirk Nowitzki (8)	Steve Nash (9)	Conseco Fieldhouse; 17,948	14–1
16	November 30	Chicago	W 103–90	Steve Nash (18)	Dirk Nowitzki (11)	Nash, Van Exel (7)	American Airlines Center; 19,940	15–1

December : 10–4 (home: 6–2; road: 4–2)

Game	Date	Team	Score	High points	High rebounds	High assists	Location Attendance	Record
17	December 2	Toronto	W 113–102	Steve Nash (25)	Shawn Bradley (8)	Steve Nash (7)	American Airlines Center; 19,696	16–1
18	December 4	@ Portland	W 103–88	Dirk Nowitzki (26)	Dirk Nowitzki (15)	Nick Van Exel (7)	Rose Garden Arena; 18,452	17–1
19	December 6	@ L.A. Lakers	L 103–105	Nick Van Exel (25)	Dirk Nowitzki (12)	Steve Nash (7)	Staples Center; 18,997	17–2
20	December 7	@ Golden State	W 121–116	Dirk Nowitzki (35)	Shawn Bradley (11)	Nick Van Exel (5)	The Arena in Oakland; 16,355	18–2
21	December 10	L.A. Clippers	W 122–95	Finley, Van Exel (24)	Shawn Bradley (11)	Steve Nash (7)	American Airlines Center; 19,715	19–2
22	December 11	@ San Antonio	L 104–111	Michael Finley (36)	Finley, Williams (8)	Steve Nash (10)	SBC Center; 17,632	19–3
23	December 14	Memphis	W 104–87	Steve Nash (26)	Shawn Bradley (18)	Nash, Van Exel (7)	American Airlines Center; 19,732	20–3
24	December 17	Indiana	W 118–97	Michael Finley (33)	Michael Finley (13)	Nick Van Exel (10)	American Airlines Center; 19,954	21–3
25	December 18	@ Denver	W 80–75	Michael Finley (31)	Shawn Bradley (12)	Nick Van Exel (6)	Pepsi Center; 13,183	22–3
26	December 20	Utah	L 81–93	Dirk Nowitzki (28)	Dirk Nowitzki (17)	Steve Nash (5)	American Airlines Center; 19,826	22–4
27	December 23	Washington	W 92–86	Dirk Nowitzki (30)	Dirk Nowitzki (17)	Steve Nash (5)	American Airlines Center; 20,119	23–4
28	December 26	@ New Orleans	W 83–81	Dirk Nowitzki (23)	Nick Van Exel (11)	Steve Nash (7)	New Orleans Arena; 18,015	24–4
29	December 28	New York	W 107–82	Nowitzki, Nash (19)	Nowitzki, Bradley (9)	Dirk Nowitzki (7)	American Airlines Center; 20,060	25–4
30	December 30	Milwaukee	L 107–110	Dirk Nowitzki (40)	Dirk Nowitzki (14)	Nowitzki, Van Exel (5)	American Airlines Center; 19,939	25–5

January : 11–4 (home: 6–1; road: 5–3)

Game	Date	Team	Score	High points	High rebounds	High assists	Location Attendance	Record
31	January 2	L.A. Clippers	W 102–92	Steve Nash (24)	Dirk Nowitzki (10)	Steve Nash (7)	American Airlines Center; 19,884	26–5
32	January 4	Philadelphia	W 102–83	Dirk Nowitzki (29)	Shawn Bradley (11)	Steve Nash (8)	American Airlines Center; 20,124	27–5
33	January 6	Denver	W 86–71	Michael Finley (19)	Raef LaFrentz (11)	Finley, Van Exel (5)	American Airlines Center; 19,773	28–5
34	January 8	@ Atlanta	W 117–99	Dirk Nowitzki (30)	Dirk Nowitzki (14)	Steve Nash (8)	Philips Arena; 10,997	29–5
35	January 10	Boston	W 103–78	Dirk Nowitzki (28)	Adrian Griffin (12)	Michael Finley (7)	American Airlines Center; 20,032	30–5
36	January 12	@ L.A. Clippers	W 96–90	Steve Nash (24)	Nash, Bradley (9)	Steve Nash (6)	Staples Center; 18,087	31–5
37	January 15	@ Sacramento	L 94–123	Nick Van Exel (20)	Dirk Nowitzki (9)	Steve Nash (7)	ARCO Arena; 17,317	31–6
38	January 17	@ Phoenix	L 106–111	Steve Nash (32)	Dirk Nowitzki (14)	Nowitzki, Van Exel (4)	America West Arena; 19,023	31–7
39	January 19	@ Seattle	L 81–85	Michael Finley (16)	Dirk Nowitzki (14)	Dirk Nowitzki (6)	KeyArena; 16,359	31–8
40	January 21	Houston	W 107–86	Dirk Nowitzki (26)	Dirk Nowitzki (8)	Steve Nash (8)	American Airlines Center; 20,104	32–8
41	January 23	@ Philadelphia	W 107–94	Dirk Nowitzki (30)	Dirk Nowitzki (14)	Steve Nash (13)	First Union Center; 20,027	33–8
42	January 24	@ New York	W 101–90	Dirk Nowitzki (30)	Dirk Nowitzki (9)	Michael Finley (9)	Madison Square Garden; 19,763	34–8
43	January 26	Portland	L 93–100	Michael Finley (27)	Nowitzki, LaFrentz (7)	Steve Nash (9)	American Airlines Center; 19,765	34–9
44	January 29	@ Houston	W 104–81	Dirk Nowitzki (34)	Shawn Bradley (9)	Nowitzki, Nash (5)	Compaq Center; 16,285	35–9
45	January 30	Minnesota	W 112–109	Dirk Nowitzki (32)	Raef LaFrentz (15)	Steve Nash (8)	American Airlines Center; 19,874	36–9

February : 8–5 (home: 4–2; road: 4–3)

Game	Date	Team	Score	High points	High rebounds	High assists	Location Attendance	Record
46	February 1	Denver	W 122–100	Nick Van Exel (30)	Shawn Bradley (9)	Nick Van Exel (7)	American Airlines Center; 19,889	37–9
47	February 3	@ Utah	W 92–90	Dirk Nowitzki (25)	Raef LaFrentz (6)	Steve Nash (6)	Delta Center; 19,130	38–9
48	February 4	Sacramento	L 109–110	Nowitzki, Finley (28)	Dirk Nowitzki (16)	Steve Nash (14)	American Airlines Center; 20,102	38–10
All-Star Break
49	February 11	@ Minnesota	L 98–100	Dirk Nowitzki (34)	Dirk Nowitzki (7)	Steve Nash (8)	Target Center; 15,145	38–11
50	February 12	@ Milwaukee	L 114–120	Dirk Nowitzki (27)	Dirk Nowitzki (12)	Steve Nash (10)	Bradley Center; 15,886	38–12
51	February 14	@ Memphis	W 110–103	Dirk Nowitzki (31)	Raef LaFrentz (14)	Steve Nash (13)	Pyramid Arena; 15,924	39–12
52	February 15	Miami	W 98–92	Dirk Nowitzki (25)	Dirk Nowitzki (12)	Dirk Nowitzki (8)	American Airlines Center; 20,003	40–12
53	February 18	Atlanta	W 105–79	Michael Finley (26)	Nowitzki, Eschmeyer (6)	Shawn Bradley (4)	American Airlines Center; 19,783	41–12
54	February 20	San Antonio	W 95–87	Steve Nash (29)	Finley, Bradley (8)	Steve Nash (10)	American Airlines Center; 20,036	42–12
55	February 21	@ Houston	W 100–85	Dirk Nowitzki (34)	Dirk Nowitzki (11)	Nick Van Exel (7)	Compaq Center; 16,285	43–12
56	February 23	@ Washington	W 106–101 (OT)	Dirk Nowitzki (29)	Dirk Nowitzki (10)	Steve Nash (10)	MCI Center; 20,173	44–12
57	February 25	@ Orlando	L 93–98	Dirk Nowitzki (26)	Dirk Nowitzki (7)	Steve Nash (5)	TD Waterhouse Centre; 16,009	44–13
58	February 27	Sacramento	L 124–126 (OT)	Dirk Nowitzki (36)	Dirk Nowitzki (13)	Steve Nash (10)	American Airlines Center; 20,059	44–14

March : 11–4 (home: 5–2; road: 6–2)

Game	Date	Team	Score	High points	High rebounds	High assists	Location Attendance	Record
59	March 1	Memphis	W 114–87	Dirk Nowitzki (28)	Finley, Nájera (10)	Steve Nash (7)	American Airlines Center; 19,828	45–14
60	March 4	New Jersey	W 88–79	Nowitzki, Nash (24)	Dirk Nowitzki (13)	Steve Nash (8)	American Airlines Center; 19,920	46–14
61	March 7	@ Miami	W 91–89	Steve Nash (22)	Michael Finley (11)	Steve Nash (5)	American Airlines Arena; 16,500	47–14
62	March 8	Utah	W 101–77	Dirk Nowitzki (21)	three players tied (6)	Steve Nash (4)	American Airlines Center; 20,123	48–14
63	March 10	Minnesota	L 83–92	Dirk Nowitzki (37)	Nowitzki, Finley (13)	Steve Nash (9)	American Airlines Center; 20,049	48–15
64	March 13	@ Seattle	L 100–107	Dirk Nowitzki (27)	Dirk Nowitzki (12)	Nowitzki, Finley (4)	KeyArena; 14,621	48–16
65	March 14	@ Golden State	W 116–114	Michael Finley (21)	Shawn Bradley (11)	Steve Nash (12)	The Arena in Oakland; 19,787	49–16
66	March 16	@ Sacramento	W 129–123 (OT)	Dirk Nowitzki (34)	Dirk Nowitzki (18)	Steve Nash (10)	ARCO Arena; 17,317	50–16
67	March 18	Cleveland	W 114–93	Dirk Nowitzki (28)	Dirk Nowitzki (8)	Steve Nash (6)	American Airlines Center; 19,952	51–16
68	March 20	San Antonio	L 110–112 (OT)	Dirk Nowitzki (34)	Dirk Nowitzki (12)	Steve Nash (7)	American Airlines Center; 20,110	51–17
69	March 22	Phoenix	W 102–95	Nowitzki, Nash (27)	Dirk Nowitzki (11)	Steve Nash (13)	American Airlines Center; 20,087	52–17
70	March 24	@ Denver	W 108–96	Dirk Nowitzki (25)	Dirk Nowitzki (8)	Steve Nash (5)	Pepsi Center; 14,714	53–17
71	March 26	@ L.A. Clippers	W 114–107	Dirk Nowitzki (27)	Dirk Nowitzki (11)	Steve Nash (12)	Staples Center; 19,595	54–17
72	March 28	@ Portland	L 95–112	Dirk Nowitzki (20)	Abdul-Wahad (8)	Nowitzki, Bell (4)	Rose Garden Arena; 20,580	54–18
73	March 30	@ Minnesota	W 119–95	Dirk Nowitzki (33)	Dirk Nowitzki (7)	Steve Nash (15)	Target Center; 19,304	55–18

April : 5–4 (home: 4–1; road: 1–3)

Game	Date	Team	Score	High points	High rebounds	High assists	Location Attendance	Record
74	April 1	New Orleans	W 95–86	Dirk Nowitzki (30)	Dirk Nowitzki (11)	Steve Nash (6)	American Airlines Center; 19,859	56–18
75	April 3	L.A. Lakers	L 89–100	Steve Nash (26)	Dirk Nowitzki (22)	Steve Nash (5)	American Airlines Center; 20,129	56–19
76	April 5	Orlando	W 108–90	Dirk Nowitzki (29)	Eduardo Nájera (7)	Steve Nash (11)	American Airlines Center; 19,800	57–19
77	April 8	@ L.A. Lakers	L 99–108	Nowitzki, LaFrentz (26)	Dirk Nowitzki (9)	Steve Nash (10)	Staples Center; 18,997	57–20
78	April 9	@ Phoenix	L 89–112	Dirk Nowitzki (26)	Dirk Nowitzki (8)	Steve Nash (5)	America West Arena; 17,136	57–21
79	April 11	@ Utah	L 92–95	Dirk Nowitzki (34)	Dirk Nowitzki (8)	Steve Nash (10)	Delta Center; 19,896	57–22
80	April 12	Golden State	W 117–108	Dirk Nowitzki (37)	Dirk Nowitzki (12)	Steve Nash (10)	American Airlines Center; 19,980	58–22
81	April 14	Seattle	W 109–106	Dirk Nowitzki (39)	Dirk Nowitzki (10)	Nowitzki, Van Exel (7)	American Airlines Center; 19,880	59–22
82	April 16	@ San Antonio	W 93–72	Dirk Nowitzki (25)	Dirk Nowitzki (10)	Steve Nash (10)	SBC Center; 19,217	60–22

2002–03 schedule

== Playoffs ==
2003 playoff game log
First round: 4–3 (home: 3–1; road: 1–2)

Game	Date	Team	Score	High points	High rebounds	High assists	Location Attendance	Series
1	April 19	Portland	W 96–86	Dirk Nowitzki (46)	Dirk Nowitzki (10)	Steve Nash (9)	American Airlines Center; 20,336	1–0
2	April 23	Portland	W 103–99	Steve Nash (28)	Dirk Nowitzki (9)	Steve Nash (8)	American Airlines Center; 20,356	2–0
3	April 25	@ Portland	W 115–103	Dirk Nowitzki (42)	Dirk Nowitzki (10)	Steve Nash (10)	Rose Garden Arena; 19,980	3–0
4	April 27	@ Portland	L 79–98	Dirk Nowitzki (26)	Dirk Nowitzki (11)	Nick Van Exel (7)	Rose Garden Arena; 19,980	3–1
5	April 30	Portland	L 99–103	Dirk Nowitzki (35)	Dirk Nowitzki (11)	Steve Nash (11)	American Airlines Center; 20,438	3–2
6	May 2	@ Portland	L 103–125	Steve Nash (21)	Adrian Griffin (8)	Steve Nash (6)	Rose Garden Arena; 20,602	3–3
7	May 4	Portland	W 107–95	Dirk Nowitzki (31)	Dirk Nowitzki (11)	Steve Nash (7)	American Airlines Center; 20,281	4–3

Conference Semi-finals: 4–3 (home: 3–1; road: 1–2)

Game	Date	Team	Score	High points	High rebounds	High assists	Location Attendance	Series
1	May 6	Sacramento	L 113–124	three players tied (20)	Dirk Nowitzki (11)	Steve Nash (7)	American Airlines Center; 20,525	0–1
2	May 8	Sacramento	W 132–110	Nick Van Exel (36)	Dirk Nowitzki (12)	Steve Nash (7)	American Airlines Center; 20,491	1–1
3	May 10	@ Sacramento	W 141–137 (2OT)	Nick Van Exel (40)	Dirk Nowitzki (20)	Steve Nash (11)	ARCO Arena; 17,317	2–1
4	May 11	@ Sacramento	L 83–99	Bell, Finley (16)	Dirk Nowitzki (11)	Steve Nash (6)	ARCO Arena; 17,317	2–2
5	May 13	Sacramento	W 112–93	Steve Nash (25)	Dirk Nowitzki (15)	Dirk Nowitzki (9)	American Airlines Center; 20,556	3–2
6	May 15	@ Sacramento	L 109–115	Nick Van Exel (35)	Dirk Nowitzki (12)	Finley, Nash (4)	ARCO Arena; 17,317	3–3
7	May 17	Sacramento	W 112–99	Dirk Nowitzki (30)	Dirk Nowitzki (19)	Steve Nash (13)	American Airlines Center; 20,595	4–3

Conference finals: 2–4 (home: 0–3; road: 2–1)

Game	Date	Team	Score	High points	High rebounds	High assists	Location Attendance	Series
1	May 19	@ San Antonio	W 113–110	Dirk Nowitzki (38)	Dirk Nowitzki (15)	Steve Nash (3)	SBC Center; 18,797	1–0
2	May 21	@ San Antonio	L 106–119	Michael Finley (29)	Finley, Nowitzki (10)	Steve Nash (8)	SBC Center; 18,797	1–1
3	May 23	San Antonio	L 83–96	Nick Van Exel (16)	Dirk Nowitzki (9)	Steve Nash (9)	American Airlines Center; 20,695	1–2
4	May 25	San Antonio	L 95–102	Finley, Nash (25)	Van Exel, Williams (8)	Van Exel, Williams (3)	American Airlines Center; 20,561	1–3
5	May 27	@ San Antonio	W 103–91	Michael Finley (31)	three players tied (8)	Steve Nash (6)	SBC Center; 18,797	2–3
6	May 29	San Antonio	L 78–90	Nick Van Exel (19)	Raef LaFrentz (12)	Steve Nash (11)	American Airlines Center; 20,812	2–4

2003 schedule

== Player statistics ==
=== Regular season ===
Player	POS	GP	GS	MP	REB	AST	STL	BLK	PTS	MPG	RPG	APG	SPG	BPG	PPG
Steve Nash	PG	82	82	2,711	234	598	85	6	1,455	33.1	2.9	7.3	1.0	.1	17.7
Shawn Bradley	C	81	39	1,731	476	54	65	170	543	21.4	5.9	.7	.8	2.1	6.7
Dirk Nowitzki	PF	80	80	3,117	791	239	111	82	2,011	39.0	9.9	3.0	1.4	1.0	25.1
Raja Bell	SG	75	32	1,173	145	57	52	8	230	15.6	1.9	.8	.7	.1	3.1
Adrian Griffin	SG	74	48	1,373	264	105	77	6	325	18.6	3.6	1.4	1.0	.1	4.4
Nick Van Exel	SG	73	1	2,026	208	312	42	4	912	27.8	2.8	4.3	.6	.1	12.5
Michael Finley	SF	69	69	2,642	402	205	76	21	1,331	38.3	5.8	3.0	1.1	.3	19.3
Raef LaFrentz	C	69	43	1,611	330	54	35	91	639	23.3	4.8	.8	.5	1.3	9.3
Walt Williams	SF	66	1	1,161	207	59	42	26	363	17.6	3.1	.9	.6	.4	5.5
Eduardo Nájera	SF	48	12	1,103	223	47	40	22	320	23.0	4.6	1.0	.8	.5	6.7
Avery Johnson	PG	48	0	430	31	64	15	1	156	9.0	.6	1.3	.3	.0	3.3
Popeye Jones	PF	26	0	222	59	8	5	1	53	8.5	2.3	.3	.2	.0	2.0
Evan Eschmeyer	C	17	3	135	29	6	10	7	17	7.9	1.7	.4	.6	.4	1.0
Tariq Abdul-Wahad	SG	14	0	204	40	21	6	3	57	14.6	2.9	1.5	.4	.2	4.1
Adam Harrington^{†}	SG	13	0	37	2	2	1	1	11	2.8	.2	.2	.1	.1	.8
Antoine Rigaudeau	SG	11	0	91	8	6	3	0	17	8.3	.7	.5	.3	.0	1.5
Mark Strickland	SF	4	0	13	7	0	0	0	4	3.3	1.8	.0	.0	.0	1.0

- ^{†} Denotes player spent time with another team in the season. Stats reflect time with the Mavericks only.

=== Playoffs ===
Player	POS	GP	GS	MP	REB	AST	STL	BLK	PTS	MPG	RPG	APG	SPG	BPG	PPG
Michael Finley	SF	20	20	822	115	60	26	12	366	41.1	5.8	3.0	1.3	.6	18.3
Steve Nash	PG	20	20	729	70	145	17	1	322	36.5	3.5	7.3	.9	.1	16.1
Raef LaFrentz	C	20	16	491	88	5	11	43	160	24.6	4.4	.3	.6	2.2	8.0
Nick Van Exel	SG	20	3	672	68	82	12	0	389	33.6	3.4	4.1	.6	.0	19.5
Eduardo Nájera	SF	19	5	394	74	15	14	4	116	20.7	3.9	.8	.7	.2	6.1
Dirk Nowitzki	PF	17	17	722	196	37	21	16	430	42.5	11.5	2.2	1.2	.9	25.3
Raja Bell	SG	17	7	305	51	27	5	0	97	17.9	3.0	1.6	.3	.0	5.7
Shawn Bradley	C	17	7	246	65	5	3	14	49	14.5	3.8	.3	.2	.8	2.9
Walt Williams	SF	15	3	227	43	15	5	12	85	15.1	2.9	1.0	.3	.8	5.7
Adrian Griffin	SG	15	2	131	44	8	4	0	37	8.7	2.9	.5	.3	.0	2.5
Tariq Abdul-Wahad	SG	8	0	79	22	7	0	0	25	9.9	2.8	.9	.0	.0	3.1
Evan Eschmeyer	C	5	0	32	5	2	3	1	6	6.4	1.0	.4	.6	.2	1.2

== Awards and records ==
- Dirk Nowitzki, All-NBA Second Team
- Steve Nash, All-NBA Third Team
- Dirk Nowitzki, NBA All-Star Game
- Steve Nash, NBA All-Star Game

== Transactions ==
=== Overview ===
Players Added

Via draft

Via trade

Via free agency

- Raja Bell
- Adam Harrington
- Popeye Jones
- Mark Strickland
- Walt Williams
Players Lost

Via trade

Via free agency

- Greg Buckner
- Danny Manning
- Johnny Newman
- Wang Zhizhi

Date	From	To	Transaction
9/20/02	WAS	DAL	The Dallas Mavericks signed Popeye Jones as a free agent.
10/1/02	PHI	DAL	The Dallas Mavericks signed Raja Bell as a free agent.
10/10/02	N/A	DAL	The Dallas Mavericks signed Adam Harrington as a free agent.
10/18/02	HOU	DAL	The Dallas Mavericks signed Walt Williams as a free agent.
11/17/02	ATL	DAL	The Dallas Mavericks signed Mark Strickland as a free agent.
1/17/03	N/A	DAL	The Dallas Mavericks signed Antoine Rigaudeau as a free agent.

Player Transactions Citation:

== See also ==
- 2002–03 NBA season
