= 2002–03 NBA season =

57th NBA season

- League: National Basketball Association
- Sport: Basketball
- Duration: October 29, 2002 – April 16, 2003; April 19 – May 29, 2003 (Playoffs); June 4 – 15, 2003 (Finals)
- Teams: 29
- TV partner(s): ABC, TNT, ESPN, NBA TV

Draft
- Top draft pick: Yao Ming
- Picked by: Houston Rockets

Regular season
- Top seed: San Antonio Spurs
- Season MVP: Tim Duncan (San Antonio)
- Top scorer: Tracy McGrady (Orlando)

Playoffs
- Eastern champions: New Jersey Nets
- Eastern runners-up: Detroit Pistons
- Western champions: San Antonio Spurs
- Western runners-up: Dallas Mavericks

Finals
- Champions: San Antonio Spurs
- Runners-up: New Jersey Nets
- Finals MVP: Tim Duncan (San Antonio)

NBA seasons
- ← 2001–02 2003–04 →

The 2002–03 NBA season was the 57th season of the National Basketball Association (NBA). The season ended with the San Antonio Spurs beating the New Jersey Nets 4–2 in the 2003 NBA Finals.

== Notable occurrences ==
Coaching changes
Offseason
Team	2001–02 coach	2002–03 coach
Denver Nuggets	Mike Evans	Jeff Bzdelik
Golden State Warriors	Brian Winters	Eric Musselman
In-season
Team	Outgoing coach	Incoming coach
Atlanta Hawks	Lon Kruger	Terry Stotts
Cleveland Cavaliers	John Lucas	Keith Smart
Los Angeles Clippers	Alvin Gentry	Dennis Johnson
Memphis Grizzlies	Sidney Lowe	Hubie Brown

- The Hornets relocate from Charlotte, North Carolina to New Orleans, Louisiana. At the time, the New Orleans Hornets were a continuation of the Charlotte Hornets franchise, but this was changed in 2014 after the second incarnation of the Hornets (originally the Charlotte Bobcats starting in 2004) purchased the records and history of the Hornets franchise from 1988 to 2002. As such, this was the first of two seasons in which the Charlotte NBA franchise "suspended operations" while the New Orleans NBA franchise was retconned as an expansion team.
- At halftime of the Hornets' first game in New Orleans, the team retired Pete Maravich's jersey number against their former tenants, the Utah Jazz. Though Maravich never played for the Hornets, he had been a star player with LSU Tigers and New Orleans Jazz.
- The San Antonio Spurs played their first game at the SBC Center, (now the Frost Bank Center).
- The Houston Rockets played their final season at the Compaq Center (formerly as The Summit, now the Lakewood Church Central Campus).
- The 2003 NBA All-Star Game was held at the Philips Arena in Atlanta. The West won 155–145 in double-overtime, the longest All-Star game in NBA history. Minnesota's Kevin Garnett took the game's MVP honors.
- Michael Jordan announces his third and final retirement, after 15 total seasons. He plays his last game on April 16, 2003, in Philadelphia.
- The NBA on ABC begins (replacing NBA on NBC) again after a 29-year hiatus when the NBA signs new television deals with TNT and the consortium of ABC and ESPN. This agreement significantly decreased the number of games on network television, including the playoffs, in which very few games are shown on ABC, with the exception of the NBA Finals, which are shown entirely on ABC. Also, both conference finals are shown live on cable for the first time.
- For the first time in NBA history, two former ABA teams contest each other in the NBA Finals, the New Jersey Nets versus the San Antonio Spurs.
- The NBA changes the first-round format from a best-of-five-game series to a best-of-seven-game series for the 2003 NBA playoffs.
- A new low in television ratings for the NBA Finals is reached, replacing the 1981 series as the least-watched Finals (later surpassed by the 2007 Finals).
- On January 7, Kobe Bryant of the Los Angeles Lakers scored 45 points against the Seattle SuperSonics. Kobe made nine consecutive three-pointers and finished with 12 overall, a new NBA record for most threes in a game, later tied by Donyell Marshall and broken by Stephen Curry (with 13 threes) and Zach LaVine and later fellow Splash Brother, Klay Thompson (with 14 threes).
- The Los Angeles Lakers debuted their white and gold alternate home jerseys in a loss against the Sacramento Kings on Christmas Day, December 25, 2002, at Staples Center. The jerseys were designed as a tribute to long-time announcer Chick Hearn, who died on August 5 from a head injury caused by a fall. The Lakers also sport a black patch in his honor.
- Lenny Wilkens becomes the all-time leader in losses, surpassing the late Bill Fitch.
- Reebok became the official outfitter for the NBA. They would provide uniforms for all but ten teams; the Boston Celtics, Chicago Bulls, Dallas Mavericks, Detroit Pistons, Los Angeles Lakers, Miami Heat, Portland Trail Blazers, San Antonio Spurs, Toronto Raptors and Washington Wizards remain under Nike until the following season, when Reebok took over. Reebok remained the league's uniform provider until its merger with Adidas in 2006.
- David Robinson announced his retirement. He would eventually go on to win the championship with the Spurs.
- The elimination of Utah Jazz in the first round of the playoffs marks the end of the 18-year Karl Malone–John Stockton tandem. Stockton would go on to retire, while Malone would play with the Lakers next season before retiring in 2004.
- The NBA has mandated installation of LED light strips on both the backboard and the scorer's table that illuminate when time expires, to assist with any potential review.
- The Dallas Mavericks started the season 14–0 one shy to tied the best start of the season set by the 1948–49 Washington Capitols and the 1993–94 Houston Rockets they started the season 15–0. The record was broken by the 2015–16 Golden State Warriors they started the season 24–0 during the 28–game winning–streak that they started when they won the last four games in the 2014–15 season.
- The Spurs and the Mavericks tied for the best record at 60–22. The Spurs won a tie–breaker for the best record due to better Conference records.
- The NBA introduces the Hardwood Classic nights for team and player milestones, team anniversary, and championship team anniversary which included the (Philadelphia 76ers, New Jersey Nets, Seattle SuperSonics, Washington Wizards, and other teams). In Game 5 of the 2003 Finals series, the Nets wore a throwback jersey from the 1976 team that marked the only time in NBA Finals history wear a throwback jersey.

== 2002–03 NBA changes ==
- Golden State Warriors – slightly changed their uniforms added orange on the side panels to their jerseys and shorts.
- Los Angeles Clippers – added new blue road alternate uniforms with white side panels to their jerseys and shorts.
- Los Angeles Lakers – added new white home alternate uniforms with gold side panels to their jerseys and shorts played on Sunday nights and Christmas Day games only.
- Portland Trail Blazers – added new logo and new uniforms, slightly changed their uniforms and also added new red road alternate uniforms.
- New Orleans Hornets – relocation from Charlotte, North Carolina to New Orleans, Louisiana, added new logo and new uniforms, adding yellow to their color scheme of teal, purple, and dark navy blue.
- New York Knicks – slightly changed their uniforms, added "NYK" subway token on the alternate logo on the back of their jersey.
- Sacramento Kings – changed their uniforms added side panels to their jerseys and shorts while the road jersey changed from black to purple with black side panels and "Sacramento" script wordmark on their jersey and white home jerseys with purple side panels and "Kings" script wordmark on their jersey.
- San Antonio Spurs – added new logo and new uniforms, replacing the fiesta colors of turquoise, fuchsia and orange with black, and silver to their color scheme, slightly changed their uniforms, and moved into their new arena the SBC Center, (now as Frost Bank Center).

== Standings ==
=== By division ===
Eastern Conference

Atlantic Division	W	L	PCT	GB	Home	Road	Div
y-New Jersey Nets	49	33	.598	–	33–8	16–25	16–8
x-Philadelphia 76ers	48	34	.585	1	25–16	23–18	17–7
x-Boston Celtics	44	38	.537	5	25–16	19–22	13–12
x-Orlando Magic	42	40	.512	7	26–15	16–25	14–11
e-Washington Wizards	37	45	.451	12	23–18	14–27	11–13
e-New York Knicks	37	45	.451	12	24–17	13–28	9–15
e-Miami Heat	25	57	.305	24	16–25	9–32	5–19

Central Division	W	L	PCT	GB	Home	Road	Div
y-Detroit Pistons	50	32	.610	–	30–11	20–21	19–9
x-Indiana Pacers	48	34	.585	2	32–9	16–25	19–9
x-New Orleans Hornets	47	35	.573	3	29–12	18–23	17–11
x-Milwaukee Bucks	42	40	.512	8	25–16	17–24	16–12
e-Atlanta Hawks	35	47	.427	15	26–15	9–32	14–14
e-Chicago Bulls	30	52	.366	20	27–14	3–38	12–16
e-Toronto Raptors	24	58	.293	26	15–26	9–32	10–18
e-Cleveland Cavaliers	17	65	.207	33	14–27	3–38	5–23

Western Conference

Midwest Division	W	L	PCT	GB	Home	Road	Div
y-San Antonio Spurs	60	22	.732	–	33–8	27–14	17–7
x-Dallas Mavericks	60	22	.732	–	33–8	27–14	18–6
x-Minnesota Timberwolves	51	31	.622	9	33–8	18–23	15–9
x-Utah Jazz	47	35	.573	13	29–12	18–23	15–9
e-Houston Rockets	43	39	.524	17	28–13	15–26	11–13
e-Memphis Grizzlies	28	54	.341	32	20–21	8–33	5–17
e-Denver Nuggets	17	65	.207	43	13–28	4–37	3–21

Pacific Division	W	L	PCT	GB	Home	Road	Div
y-Sacramento Kings	59	23	.720	–	35–6	24–17	17–7
x-Los Angeles Lakers	50	32	.610	9	31–10	19–22	15–9
x-Portland Trail Blazers	50	32	.610	9	27–14	23–18	15–9
x-Phoenix Suns	44	38	.537	15	30–11	14–27	12–12
e-Seattle SuperSonics	40	42	.488	19	25–16	15–26	11–13
e-Golden State Warriors	38	44	.463	21	24–17	14–27	8–16
e-Los Angeles Clippers	27	55	.329	32	16–25	11–30	6–18

=== By conference ===
#	Eastern Conference				
#	Team	W	L	PCT	GB
1	c-Detroit Pistons	50	32	.610	–
2	y-New Jersey Nets	49	33	.598	1
3	x-Indiana Pacers	48	34	.585	2
4	x-Philadelphia 76ers	48	34	.585	2
5	x-New Orleans Hornets	47	35	.573	3
6	x-Boston Celtics	44	38	.537	6
7	x-Milwaukee Bucks	42	40	.512	8
8	x-Orlando Magic	42	40	.512	8
9	e-New York Knicks	37	45	.451	13
10	e-Washington Wizards	37	45	.451	13
11	e-Atlanta Hawks	35	47	.427	15
12	e-Chicago Bulls	30	52	.366	20
13	e-Miami Heat	25	57	.305	25
14	e-Toronto Raptors	24	58	.293	26
15	e-Cleveland Cavaliers	17	65	.207	33

#	Western Conference				
#	Team	W	L	PCT	GB
1	z-San Antonio Spurs	60	22	.732	–
2	y-Sacramento Kings	59	23	.720	1
3	x-Dallas Mavericks	60	22	.732	–
4	x-Minnesota Timberwolves	51	31	.622	9
5	x-Los Angeles Lakers	50	32	.610	10
6	x-Portland Trail Blazers	50	32	.610	10
7	x-Utah Jazz	47	35	.573	13
8	x-Phoenix Suns	44	38	.537	16
9	e-Houston Rockets	43	39	.524	17
10	e-Seattle SuperSonics	40	42	.488	20
11	e-Golden State Warriors	38	44	.463	22
12	e-Memphis Grizzlies	28	54	.341	32
13	e-Los Angeles Clippers	27	55	.329	33
14	e-Denver Nuggets	17	65	.207	43

Notes

- z – Clinched home court advantage for the entire playoffs
- c – Clinched home court advantage for the conference playoffs
- y – Clinched division title
- x – Clinched playoff spot
- e – Eliminated from playoff contention

== Playoffs ==
Teams in bold advanced to the next round. The numbers to the left of each team indicate the team's seeding in its conference, and the numbers to the right indicate the number of games the team won in that round. The division champions are marked by an asterisk. Home-court advantage does not necessarily belong to the higher-seeded team, but instead the team with the better regular-season record; teams enjoying the home advantage are shown in italics.

First Round	Conference Semifinals
**E1**	**Detroit***	**4**
E8	Orlando	3
**E1**	**Detroit***	**4**
E4	Philadelphia	2
**E4**	**Philadelphia**	**4**
E5	New Orleans	2
**Eastern Conference**
E3	Indiana	2
**E6**	**Boston**	**4**
E6	Boston	0
**E2**	**New Jersey***	**4**
**E2**	**New Jersey***	**4**
E7	Milwaukee	2
**W1**	**San Antonio***	**4**
W8	Phoenix	2
**W1**	**San Antonio***	**4**
W5	LA Lakers	2
W4	Minnesota	2
**W5**	**LA Lakers**	**4**
**Western Conference**
**W3**	**Dallas**	**4**
W6	Portland	3
**W3**	**Dallas**	**4**
W2	Sacramento*	3
**W2**	**Sacramento***	**4**
W7	Utah	1

Conference Finals
E1	Detroit*	0
**E2**	**New Jersey***	**4**
**W1**	**San Antonio***	**4**
W3	Dallas	2

NBA Finals
E2	New Jersey*	2
**W1**	**San Antonio***	**4**

- * Division winner
- **Bold** Series winner
- Italic Team with home-court advantage

== Statistics leaders ==
Category	Player	Team	Stat
Points per game	Tracy McGrady	Orlando Magic	32.1
Rebounds per game	Ben Wallace	Detroit Pistons	15.5
Assists per game	Jason Kidd	New Jersey Nets	9.0
Steals per game	Allen Iverson	Philadelphia 76ers	2.74
Blocks per game	Theo Ratliff	Atlanta Hawks	3.23
FG%	Eddy Curry	Chicago Bulls	.585
FT%	Allan Houston	New York Knicks	.919
3FG%	Bruce Bowen	San Antonio Spurs	.441

== Awards ==
=== Yearly awards ===
- Most Valuable Player: Tim Duncan, San Antonio Spurs
- Rookie of the Year: Amar'e Stoudemire, Phoenix Suns
- Defensive Player of the Year: Ben Wallace, Detroit Pistons
- Sixth Man of the Year: Bobby Jackson, Sacramento Kings
- Most Improved Player: Gilbert Arenas, Golden State Warriors
- Coach of the Year: Gregg Popovich, San Antonio Spurs
- Executive of the Year: Joe Dumars, Detroit Pistons
- Sportsmanship Award: Ray Allen, Seattle SuperSonics

- All-NBA First Team:
  - F – Kevin Garnett, Minnesota Timberwolves
  - F – Tim Duncan, San Antonio Spurs
  - C – Shaquille O'Neal, Los Angeles Lakers
  - G – Kobe Bryant, Los Angeles Lakers
  - G – Tracy McGrady, Orlando Magic
- All-NBA Second Team:
  - F – Dirk Nowitzki, Dallas Mavericks
  - F – Chris Webber, Sacramento Kings
  - C – Ben Wallace, Detroit Pistons
  - G – Jason Kidd, New Jersey Nets
  - G – Allen Iverson, Philadelphia 76ers
- All-NBA Third Team:
  - F – Paul Pierce, Boston Celtics
  - F – Jamal Mashburn, New Orleans Hornets
  - C – Jermaine O'Neal, Indiana Pacers
  - G – Stephon Marbury, Phoenix Suns
  - G – Steve Nash, Dallas Mavericks

- NBA All-Defensive First Team
  - F – Tim Duncan, San Antonio Spurs
  - F – Kevin Garnett, Minnesota Timberwolves
  - C – Ben Wallace, Detroit Pistons
  - G – Doug Christie, Sacramento Kings
  - G – Kobe Bryant, Los Angeles Lakers
- All-Defensive Second Team:
  - F – Ron Artest, Indiana Pacers
  - F – Bruce Bowen, San Antonio Spurs
  - C – Shaquille O'Neal, Los Angeles Lakers
  - G – Jason Kidd, New Jersey Nets
  - G – Eric Snow, Philadelphia 76ers

- NBA All-Rookie First Team:
  - Yao Ming, Houston Rockets
  - Amar'e Stoudemire, Phoenix Suns
  - Caron Butler, Miami Heat
  - Drew Gooden, Orlando Magic
  - Nenê Hilario, (Note: Entered the NBA as Nenê Hilário before changing his name in 2003.) Denver Nuggets
- All-Rookie Second Team:
  - G – Manu Ginóbili, San Antonio Spurs
  - G – Gordan Giricek, Orlando Magic
  - F – Carlos Boozer, Cleveland Cavaliers
  - G – Jay Williams, Chicago Bulls
  - G – J. R. Bremer, Boston Celtics

=== Players of the month ===
The following players were named the Eastern and Western Conference Players of the Month.

Month	Eastern Conference	Western Conference
October – November	Tracy McGrady (Orlando Magic) (1/2)	Michael Finley (Dallas Mavericks) (1/1); Steve Nash (Dallas Mavericks) (1/1); Dirk Nowitzki (Dallas Mavericks) (1/1)
December	Jason Kidd (New Jersey Nets) (1/1)	Chris Webber (Sacramento Kings) (1/1)
January	Jermaine O'Neal (Indiana Pacers) (1/1)	Kobe Bryant (Los Angeles Lakers) (1/1)
February	Jamal Mashburn (New Orleans Hornets) (1/1)	Kevin Garnett (Minnesota Timberwolves) (1/2)
March	Tracy McGrady (Orlando Magic) (2/2)	Shaquille O'Neal (Los Angeles Lakers) (1/1)
April	Jamaal Magloire (New Orleans Hornets) (1/1)	Kevin Garnett (Minnesota Timberwolves) (2/2)

=== Rookies of the month ===
The following players were named the Eastern and Western Conference Rookies of the Month.

Month	Eastern Conference	Western Conference
October – November	Caron Butler (Miami Heat) (1/4)	Drew Gooden (Memphis Grizzlies) (1/1)
December	Jay Williams (Chicago Bulls) (1/1)	Yao Ming (Houston Rockets) (1/2)
January	Caron Butler (Miami Heat) (2/4)	Amar'e Stoudemire (Phoenix Suns) (1/2)
February	Caron Butler (Miami Heat) (3/4)	Yao Ming (Houston Rockets) (2/2)
March	Caron Butler (Miami Heat) (4/4)	Manu Ginóbili (San Antonio Spurs) (1/1)
April	Carlos Boozer (Cleveland Cavaliers) (1/1)	Amar'e Stoudemire (Phoenix Suns) (2/2)

=== Coaches of the month ===
The following coaches were named the Eastern and Western Conference Coaches of the Month.

Month	Eastern Conference	Western Conference
October – November	Isiah Thomas (Indiana Pacers) (1/1)	Don Nelson (Dallas Mavericks) (1/1)
December	Byron Scott (New Jersey Nets) (1/1)	Frank Johnson (Phoenix Suns) (1/1)
January	George Karl (Milwaukee Bucks) (1/1)	Gregg Popovich (San Antonio Spurs) (1/2)
February	Larry Brown (Philadelphia 76ers) (1/2)	Flip Saunders (Minnesota Timberwolves) (1/1)
March	Larry Brown (Philadelphia 76ers) (2/2)	Gregg Popovich (San Antonio Spurs) (2/2)
April	Paul Silas (New Orleans Hornets) (1/1)	Phil Jackson (Los Angeles Lakers) (1/1)

== See also ==
- List of NBA regular season records
