= Michael Finley =

American basketball player (born 1973)

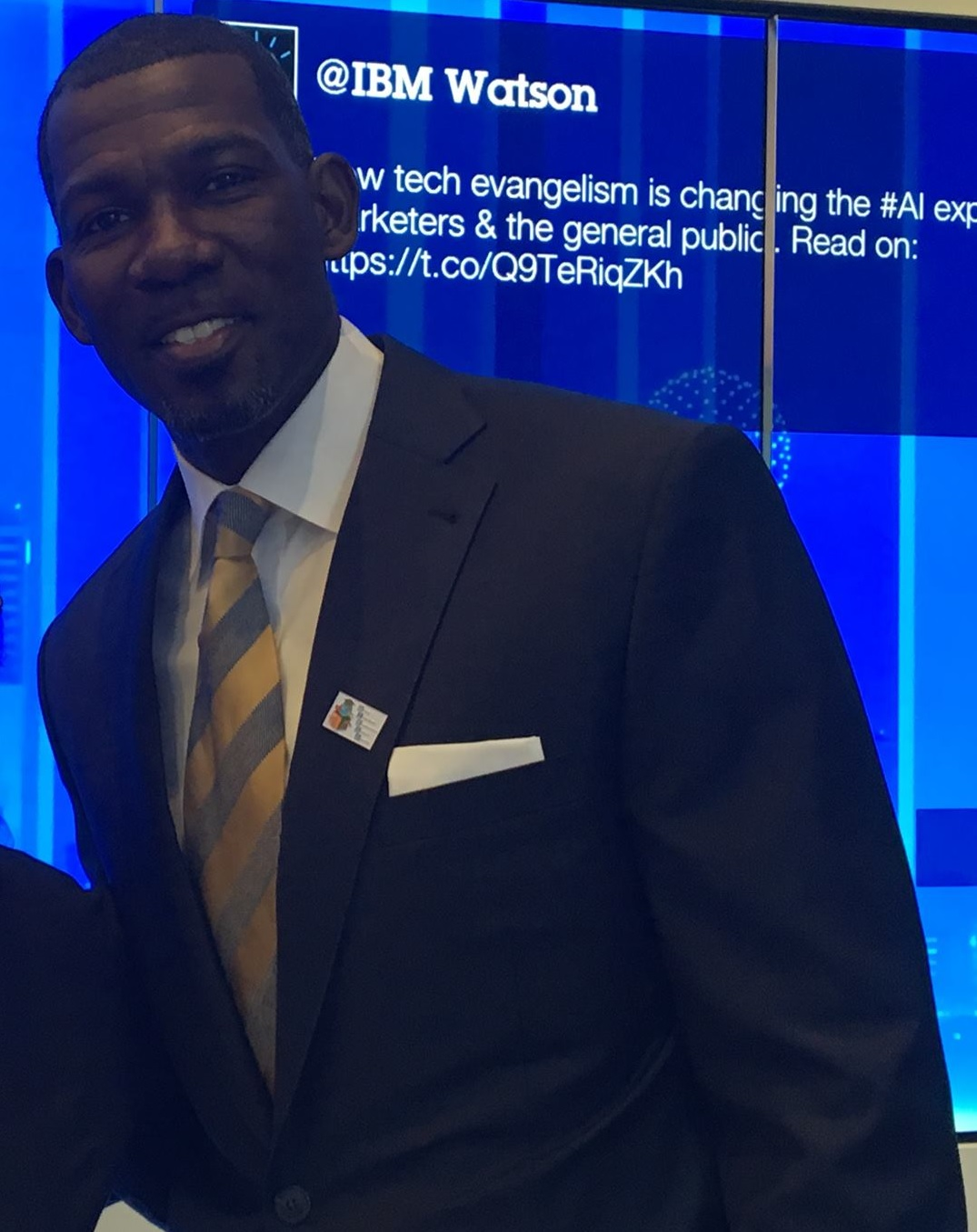
- Finley in 2016

Dallas Mavericks
- Title: Interim general manager Vice president of player personnel
- League: NBA

Personal information
- Born: March 6, 1973 (age 53) Melrose Park, Illinois, U.S.
- Listed height: 6 ft 7 in (2.01 m)
- Listed weight: 225 lb (102 kg)

Career information
- High school: Proviso East (Maywood, Illinois)
- College: Wisconsin (1991–1995)
- NBA draft: 1995: 1st round, 21st overall pick
- Drafted by: Phoenix Suns
- Playing career: 1995–2010
- Position: Small forward / shooting guard
- Number: 4, 40

Career history
- 1995–1996: Phoenix Suns
- 1996–2005: Dallas Mavericks
- 2005–2010: San Antonio Spurs
- 2010: Boston Celtics

Career highlights
- NBA champion (2007); 2× NBA All-Star (2000, 2001); NBA All-Rookie First Team (1996); 2× First-team All-Big Ten (1993, 1995); USA Basketball Male Athlete of the Year (1993); No. 24 jersey retired by Wisconsin Badgers

Career statistics
- Points: 17,306 (15.8 ppg)
- Rebounds: 4,804 (4.4 rpg)
- Assists: 3,245 (2.9 apg)
- Stats at NBA.com
- Stats at Basketball Reference
Medals
Men's basketball
Representing United States
Goodwill Games
Bronze medal – third place	1994 St. Petersburg	National team
Summer Universiade
Gold medal – first place	1993 Buffalo	National team

Michael Howard Finley (born March 6, 1973) is an American former professional basketball player who is an interim general manager and vice president of player personnel for the Dallas Mavericks of the National Basketball Association (NBA). He played 15 seasons in the NBA, predominantly with the Mavericks, but also for the Phoenix Suns (who drafted him in 1995), the San Antonio Spurs, and the Boston Celtics. He was a two-time NBA All-Star and won an NBA championship with the Spurs in 2007.

== Early life ==
Finley attended Proviso East High School in Maywood, Illinois, graduating in 1991. In Finley's senior season, Proviso East won the 1991 IHSA class AA boys basketball tournament, and Finley was named to the all-tournament team. Finley's teammates, known collectively as the "Three Amigos", included future NBA draftees Sherell Ford and Donnie Boyce. In response to winning the state championship, Finley was invited to travel to Deerfield, Illinois, where he played against Michael Jordan in a game of H-O-R-S-E and a 1-on-1 game to three points. Jordan H-O-R-S-E and won the game of 1-on-1 three to one. Both games were recorded and broadcast on a sporting chance segment for WBBM CBS Chicago.

In 2007, Finley was voted one of the "100 Legends of the IHSA Boys Basketball Tournament".

== College career ==
The 6' 7" shooting guard/small forward was originally drafted out of University of Wisconsin–Madison by the Phoenix Suns as the 21st overall pick of the 1995 NBA draft. Finley held the all-time scoring record at Wisconsin for eleven years before being passed by Alando Tucker on March 10, 2007.

The 2024–25 Big Ten Conference men's basketball season, which followed the expansion of the Big Ten with 4 Pac-12 Conference teams (Oregon, UCLA, USC, and Washington), On February 13, 1993 Finley's 10-steal performance set a Big Ten record that has been tied by Mike Kelley (WIS vs. Texas 12/7/1999), but not been surpassed by a Big Ten player. However, following the expansion, the Big Ten record book recognized Tyus Edney's 11-steal game December 22, 1994 game for UCLA against George Mason as the conference record.

== NBA career ==
=== Phoenix Suns (1995–1996) ===
Finley was named to the 1995–96 NBA All-Rookie First Team and finished third in Rookie of the Year voting after averaging fifteen points, 4.6 rebounds and 3.5 assists per game. He became only the third rookie in Suns history to score over 1,000 points in a season. Despite playing all 82 games in his rookie season, Finley was injured on the final day of regular season and did not play in the playoffs. He was traded by the Suns on December 26, 1996 to the Dallas Mavericks along with Sam Cassell, A.C. Green and a second-round draft pick for Jason Kidd, Tony Dumas and Loren Meyer.

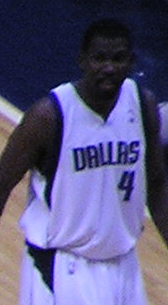
Finley with the Mavericks in 2005

=== Dallas Mavericks (1996–2005) ===
Finley flourished in Dallas. In his first season with the Mavericks, Finley led the team in scoring, assists and steals. Along with point guard Steve Nash and forward Dirk Nowitzki, he became an integral part of the Mavericks' late '90s "run and gun" offense.

In 2000, he was selected to represent the Western Conference in the 2000 All-Star Game, in which he scored eleven points. On January 23, 2001, Finley tied an NBA record by recording eight steals in one half of a game. In 2001, he was again selected to represent the Western Conference on All-Star weekend. He played for the US national team in the 2002 FIBA World Championship, which lost a record-three games and failed to win a championship for the first time in a major competition since FIBA opened international competitions to NBA players.

While Finley began to play more of a supporting role (small forward) as he aged and teammate Dirk Nowitzki blossomed, he remained a clutch player for the Mavericks. In 2005, he was waived by Dallas to avoid luxury taxes (as part of the league's new labor agreement). Finley became an unrestricted free agent and after being pursued by Detroit, Miami, Minnesota, and Phoenix, he elected to remain in Texas with the San Antonio Spurs.

=== San Antonio Spurs (2005–2010) ===
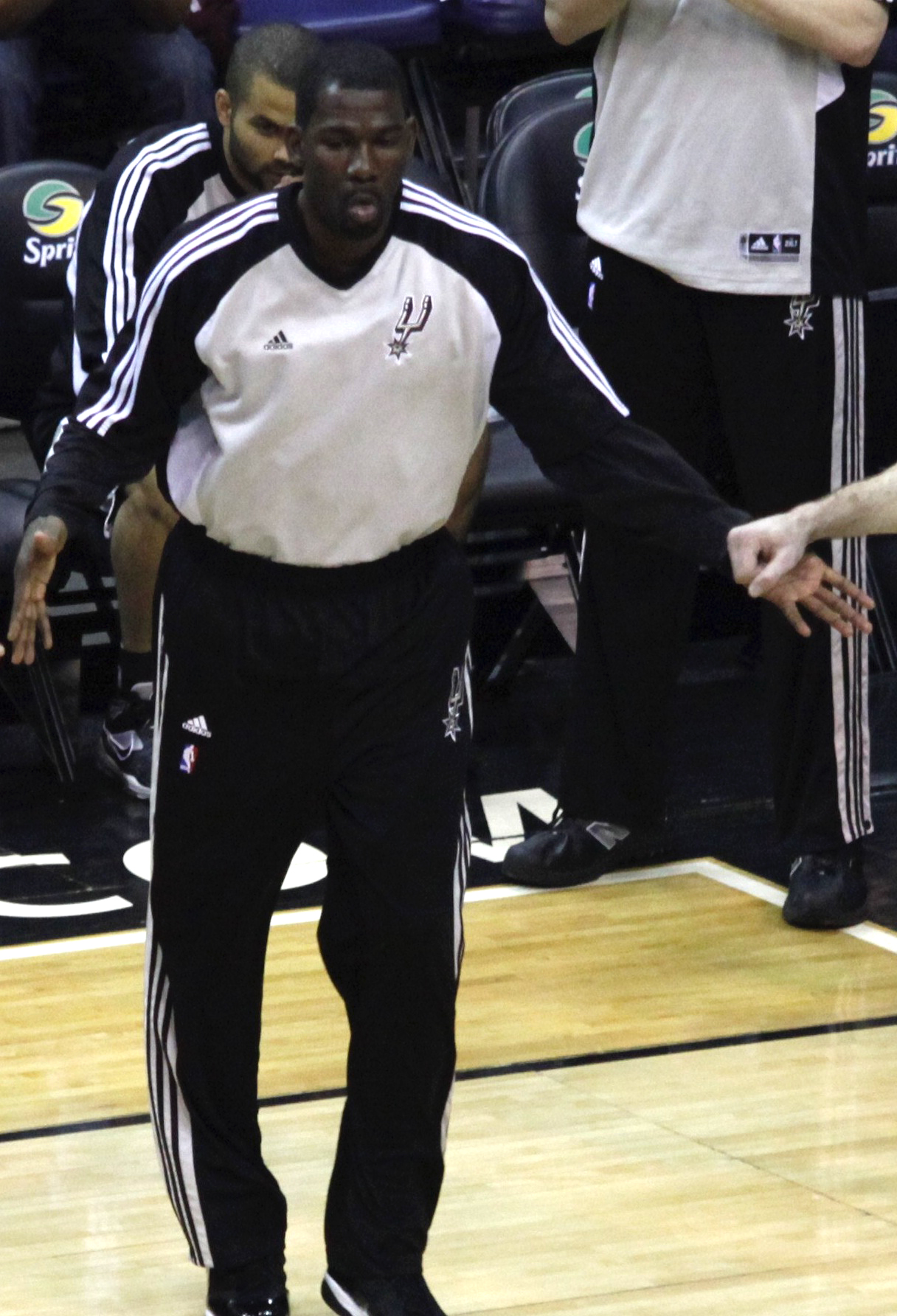
Finley with the Spurs in 2009

In San Antonio, Finley adapted well to a secondary role as Manu Ginóbili's backup, developing and emphasizing his outside shooting. The Spurs would face Finley's former team the Mavericks in the second round of the 2006 NBA playoffs. In Game 5 of the series, Finley was punched by former teammate Jason Terry, earning Terry a suspension for the next game of the series and irritating Mavericks owner Mark Cuban. The Spurs would force a seventh game after facing a 3–1 deficit, but ultimately fell to the Mavericks in overtime.

In the fifth and final game of San Antonio's first-round series against Denver in 2007, Finley set the Spurs' record for three-point field goals in a playoff game, making eight of nine attempts. He eclipsed the previous record of seven set by teammate Bruce Bowen in 2003. Finley won his only NBA championship in 2007 with the San Antonio Spurs in his 12th NBA season.

At Finley's request, the Spurs bought out the final year of his contract and waived him on March 1, 2010, freeing him to sign with another team.

=== Boston Celtics (2010) ===
On March 4, 2010, Finley reached a verbal agreement with the Boston Celtics to join the team for the remainder of the 2009–10 season. He signed with the Celtics on March 6, 2010. The Celtics reached the 2010 NBA Finals, but lost to the defending champion Los Angeles Lakers in seven games. At the end of the season, Finley announced he would retire.

== Personal life ==
Finley began playing basketball in elementary school. His favorite player was Michael Jordan and he would occasionally go to Chicago Bulls games. He majored in business management at Wisconsin. Although he did not graduate at the time due to the NBA draft, he completed his bachelor's degree in 2014 in agricultural and applied economics at Wisconsin. Finley attended the same high school as Milwaukee Bucks head coach Doc Rivers.

== Other work ==
=== Basketball ===
He works in the front office as the Vice President of Basketball Operations for the Dallas Mavericks.

=== Film ===
Finley was one of the producers of the films Lee Daniels' The Butler and The Birth of a Nation.

== Career statistics ==
=== NBA ===
Legend
GP	Games played	GS	Games started	MPG	Minutes per game
FG%	Field goal percentage	3P%	3-point field goal percentage	FT%	Free throw percentage
RPG	Rebounds per game	APG	Assists per game	SPG	Steals per game
BPG	Blocks per game	PPG	Points per game	**Bold**	Career high
†	Won an NBA championship	*	Led the league

==== Regular season ====
Year	Team	GP	GS	MPG	FG%	3P%	FT%	RPG	APG	SPG	BPG	PPG
1995–96	Phoenix	82	72	39.2	.476	.328	.749	4.6	3.5	1.0	.4	15.0
1996–97	Phoenix	**27***	18	29.5	.475	.255	.812	4.4	2.5	.7	.1	13.0
1996–97	Dallas	**56***	36	35.6	.432	.387	.807	4.5	2.8	.9	.4	16.0
1997–98	Dallas	82*	**82***	41.4*	.449	.357	.784	5.3	4.9	**1.6**	.4	21.5
1998–99	Dallas	50*	50*	41.0	.444	.331	.823	5.3	4.4	1.3	.3	20.2
1999–2000	Dallas	82	**82***	**42.2**	.457	.401	.820	**6.3**	**5.3**	1.3	.4	**22.6**
2000–01	Dallas	82	**82***	42.0*	.458	.346	.775	5.2	4.4	1.4	.4	21.5
2001–02	Dallas	69	69	39.9*	.463	.339	.837	5.2	3.3	.9	.4	20.6
2002–03	Dallas	69	69	38.3	.425	.370	.861	5.8	3.0	1.1	.3	19.3
2003–04	Dallas	72	72	38.6	.443	.405	.850	4.5	2.9	1.2	**.5**	18.6
2004–05	Dallas	64	64	36.8	.427	.407	.831	4.1	2.6	.8	.3	15.7
2005–06	San Antonio	77	18	26.5	.412	.394	.852	3.2	1.5	.5	.1	10.1
2006–07†	San Antonio	82*	16	22.2	.412	.364	**.918**	2.7	1.3	.4	.2	9.0
2007–08	San Antonio	82*	61	26.9	.414	.370	.800	3.1	1.4	.4	.1	10.1
2008–09	San Antonio	81	77	28.8	.437	.411	.823	3.3	1.4	.5	.2	9.7
2009–10	San Antonio	25	6	15.8	.381	.317	.667	1.5	0.8	.2	.2	3.7
2009–10	Boston	21	1	15.0	**.506**	**.463**	.333	1.6	1.1	.2	.1	5.2
Career		1103	875	34.5	.440	.390	.813	4.1	2.9	.9	.3	15.7
All-Star		2	0	14.5	.476	.250	1,000	2.0	2.5	.0	.0	11.5

==== Playoffs ====
Year	Team	GP	GS	MPG	FG%	3P%	FT%	RPG	APG	SPG	BPG	PPG
2001	Dallas	10	10	43.4	.360	.362	.818	5.3	**4.4**	1.2	.2	19.7
2002	Dallas	8	8	**46.6**	.466	.378	.900	**6.3**	2.3	**1.5**	.5	**24.6**
2003	Dallas	**20**	**20**	41.1	.435	.412	.864	5.8	3.0	1.3	**.6**	18.3
2004	Dallas	5	5	39.9	.382	.269	.600	3.2	2.6	.8	**.6**	13.0
2005	Dallas	13	13	37.8	.425	.393	.889	4.3	2.2	1.3	.0	13.1
2006	San Antonio	13	4	31.6	**.476**	.383	.900	3.8	1.4	.6	.2	10.5
2007†	San Antonio	**20**	**20**	26.9	.410	.419	.897	2.9	1.1	.6	.2	11.3
2008	San Antonio	17	11	23.0	.402	.365	**1.000**	1.9	1.0	.3	.2	6.7
2009	San Antonio	5	5	28.6	.441	**.467**	.750	3.0	1.0	.2	.2	8.0
2010	Boston	18	0	6.0	.250	.273	**1.000**	.6	.2	.2	.0	.8
Career		129	96	30.3	.418	.388	.866	3.5	1.8	.8	.2	11.8

===== Finals =====
Year	Team	GP	GS	MPG	FG%	3P%	FT%	RPG	APG	SPG	BPG	PPG
2007†	San Antonio	**4**	**4**	**18.5**	**.261**	**.083**	**.667**	**2.0**	**.8**	**1.3**	**.0**	**3.8**
2010	Boston	2	0	2.5	.000	.000	.000	.0	.0	.0	**.0**	.0
Career		6	4	13.2	.250	.077	.667	1.3	.5	.7	.0	2.5

=== College ===
Year	Team	GP	GS	MPG	FG%	3P%	FT%	RPG	APG	SPG	BPG	PPG
1991–92	Wisconsin	**31**	28	29.7	.453	.361	.742	4.9	2.7	.9	**.8**	12.3
1992–93	Wisconsin	28	28	35.0	**.467**	**.364**	.771	5.8	3.1	1.8	.6	**22.1**
1993–94	Wisconsin	29	**29**	36.1	.466	.363	**.786**	**6.7**	3.2	1.4	.7	20.4
1994–95	Wisconsin	27	27	**37.0**	.379	.284	.773	5.2	**4.0**	**1.9**	.6	20.5
Career		115	112	34.3	.440	.338	.769	5.6	3.2	1.5	.7	18.7

== See also ==
- List of National Basketball Association career 3-point scoring leaders
- List of National Basketball Association career playoff 3-point scoring leaders
- List of National Basketball Association single-game steals leaders
- List of National Basketball Association annual minutes leaders
- List of National Basketball Association career minutes played leaders
