= 2003 NBA All-Star Game =

Exhibition basketball game

	1	2	3	4	OT	2OT	Total
West	18	37	31	34	18	17	155
East	23	29	41	27	18	7	145
- Date: February 9, 2003
- Arena: Philips Arena
- City: Atlanta
- MVP: Kevin Garnett
- National anthem: Gloria Reuben (CAN); Martina McBride (USA)
- Halftime show: Mariah Carey (celebrating the career of Michael Jordan)
- Attendance: 20,325
- Network: TNT; ESPN Radio
- Announcers: Marv Albert, Mike Fratello, and Jeff Van Gundy; Kevin Harlan, Danny Ainge, Charles Barkley, Kenny Smith and Magic Johnson (All-Star Saturday Night); Jim Durham and Jack Ramsay

NBA All-Star Game
< 2002	2004 >

The 2003 NBA All-Star Game was an exhibition basketball game which was played on February 9, 2003, at the Philips Arena in Atlanta, home of the Atlanta Hawks. This game was the 52nd edition of the North American National Basketball Association (NBA) All-Star Game and was played during the 2002–03 NBA season.

The West defeated the East 155–145 in double overtime, with Kevin Garnett of the Minnesota Timberwolves winning the Most Valuable Player. Garnett scored 37 points, grabbed 9 rebounds, and had 5 steals. Allen Iverson led the East with 35 points.

This was the first All-Star Game to be transmitted on cable television, through TNT. This was also the 14th and final All-Star Game that Michael Jordan participated in, as a result of his final retirement after the 2002–03 season. It was the most recent NBA All-Star Game to be decided in overtime, as well as the first (and so far, only) to be decided in double-overtime. This was the second time that Atlanta hosted the All-Star Game; the previous time was in 1978. This was also the fifth time that the Hawks hosted the All-Star Game, as they had also hosted it in St. Louis in 1958, 1962, and 1965.

== All-Star Game ==
=== Coaches ===
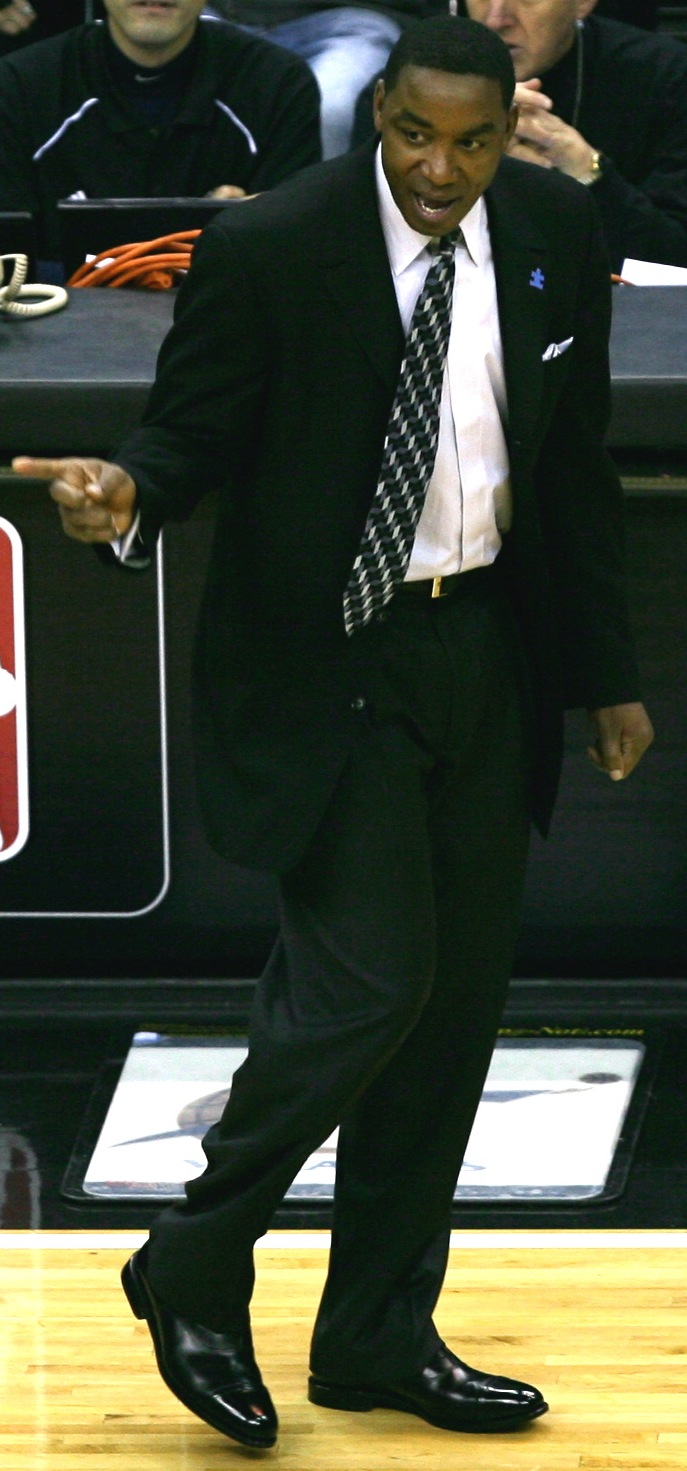
Isiah Thomas was chosen as the East head coach for the first time in his career.

The coach for the Western Conference team was Sacramento Kings head coach Rick Adelman. Although the Dallas Mavericks have the best record in the West, their head coach, Don Nelson, was ineligible to coach in the All-Star Game because he had coached in the 2002 game and league rules prohibit a coach from coaching in consecutive All-Star Games. The coach for the Eastern Conference team was Isiah Thomas, head coach of the Eastern Conference leader Indiana Pacers.

=== Players ===
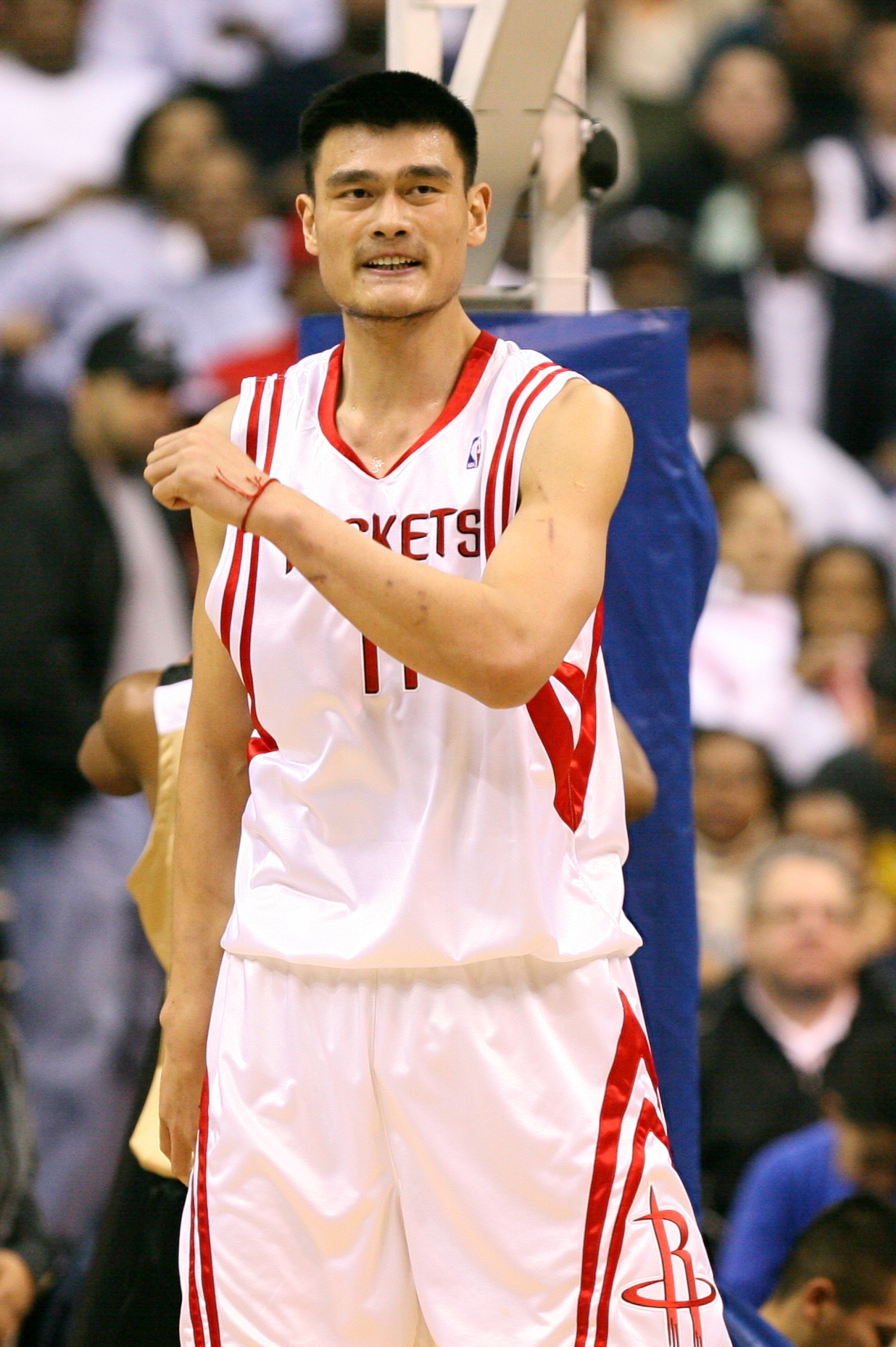
Yao Ming, from China, became the first rookie in eight years to be selected by fans as an All-Star starter.

The rosters for the All-Star Game were chosen in two ways. The starters were chosen via a fan ballot. Two guards, two forwards and one center who received the highest vote were named the All-Star starters. This was also the first time that the league offered All-Star ballots in three languages — English, Spanish and Chinese — for fan voting of the starters. The reserves were chosen by votes among the NBA head coaches in their respective conferences. The coaches were not permitted to vote for their own players. The reserves consist of two guards, two forwards, one center and two players regardless of position. If a player is unable to participate due to injury, the commissioner will select a replacement.

Kobe Bryant of the Los Angeles Lakers led the ballots with 1,474,386 votes, which earned him a starting position as a guard in the Western Conference team for the fifth year in a row. Yao Ming, of the Houston Rockets, was the second player with the most votes for the West, becoming the first rookie starter in the All-Star Game since Grant Hill in 1995. Yao was voted to start over Shaquille O'Neal, who was coming off three consecutive NBA Finals MVP Awards, receiving nearly a quarter million more votes than the Lakers center. Steve Francis, Kevin Garnett, and Tim Duncan completed the Western Conference starting positions. Bryant, Garnett, Francis, and Duncan were all starters for the previous year's Western Conference team. The Western Conference reserves included one first-time selection, Shawn Marion, of the Phoenix Suns. The squad was rounded out by Gary Payton, Steve Nash, Dirk Nowitzki, Chris Webber, Peja Stojaković, Stephon Marbury, and Shaquille O'Neal. Five teams, Los Angeles Lakers, Dallas Mavericks, Houston Rockets, Sacramento Kings, and Phoenix Suns, had two representations at the All-Star Game with Bryant/O'Neal, Nash/Nowitzki, Francis/Yao, Webber/Stojaković and Marion/Marbury.

The Eastern Conference's leading vote-getter was Tracy McGrady, who earned his third consecutive All-Star Game selection with 1,316,297 votes. Allen Iverson, Vince Carter, Jermaine O'Neal, and Ben Wallace completed the Eastern Conference starting position. This was Wallace's first All-Star selection, as he led the league in rebounding. This was also the fourth consecutive All-Star appearance by Iverson and Carter, and O'Neal's second appearance as an All-Star. The Eastern Conference reserves included three first-time selections, Brad Miller, Jamal Mashburn, and Žydrūnas Ilgauskas. Michael Jordan, Jason Kidd, Paul Pierce, and Antoine Walker rounded out the team. However, Carter relinquished his starting spot to Jordan, so he could start his final All-Star Game. Two teams, Indiana Pacers and Boston Celtics, had two representations at the All-Star Game with O'Neal/Miller, and Walker/Pierce.

=== Roster ===
Eastern Conference All-Stars
Pos	Player	Team	No. of selections	Votes
Starters
G	Allen Iverson	Philadelphia 76ers	4th	1,155,897
G	Tracy McGrady	Orlando Magic	3rd	1,316,297
F	Vince Carter^{1}	Toronto Raptors	4th	1,300,895
F	Jermaine O'Neal	Indiana Pacers	2nd	940,958
C	Ben Wallace	Detroit Pistons	1st	1,123,090
Reserves
G	Michael Jordan^{1}	Washington Wizards	14th	1,082,909
G	Jason Kidd	New Jersey Nets	6th	962,325
F	Paul Pierce	Boston Celtics	2nd	313,652
F	Jamal Mashburn	New Orleans Hornets	1st	235,417
F	Antoine Walker	Boston Celtics	3rd	528,613
C	Žydrūnas Ilgauskas	Cleveland Cavaliers	1st	297,895
C	Brad Miller	Indiana Pacers	1st	238,755

Western Conference All-Stars
Pos	Player	Team	No. of selections	Votes
Starters
G	Steve Francis	Houston Rockets	2nd	966,669
G	Kobe Bryant	Los Angeles Lakers	5th	1,474,386
F	Kevin Garnett	Minnesota Timberwolves	6th	1,086,780
F	Tim Duncan	San Antonio Spurs	5th	1,179,955
C	Yao Ming	Houston Rockets	1st	1,286,324
Reserves
G	Stephon Marbury	Phoenix Suns	2nd	—
G	Steve Nash	Dallas Mavericks	2nd	786,923
G	Gary Payton	Seattle SuperSonics	9th	511,056
F	Shawn Marion	Phoenix Suns	1st	—
F	Dirk Nowitzki	Dallas Mavericks	2nd	1,079,425
F	Peja Stojaković^{REP}	Sacramento Kings	2nd	308,524
F	Chris Webber^{INJ}	Sacramento Kings	5th	906,836
C	Shaquille O'Neal	Los Angeles Lakers	10th	1,049,081

^INJ Chris Webber was unable to participate due to injury.
^REP Peja Stojaković was named as Webber's replacement.
^1 Vince Carter relinquished his starting spot to Michael Jordan.

=== Game ===
TNT

February 9, 2003

Kevin Garnett MVP

Western Conference 155, Eastern Conference 145 (2OT)
Scoring by quarter: 18–23, 37–29, 31–41, 34–27, Overtime: 18–18, 17–7
Pts: Kevin Garnett 37; Rebs: Tim Duncan 15; Asts: Steve Francis 9	Pts: Allen Iverson 35; Rebs: Jermaine O'Neal 10; Asts: Jason Kidd 10

Philips Arena, Atlanta
Attendance: 20,325
Referees: Jim Clark, Luis Grillo, Ted Bernhardt

The Western All-Stars won the game 155–145 in double overtime. It seemed the East were on way to a victory when Jordan hit a jump shot to give the East a 138–136 lead with 4.8 seconds remaining in overtime. However, Jermaine O'Neal fouled Kobe Bryant while shooting a three-point field goal with one second remaining. Bryant hit two of the three shots to tie the game, resulting in the first double-overtime in All-Star history. In the second overtime, Kevin Garnett hit three jumpers in the post over a smaller Vince Carter to lead the West to victory. Garnett won the MVP award after scoring a game-high 37 points. It was Jordan's final All-Star game. After declining Allen Iverson and Tracy McGrady's offers to give him their starting spot, he accepted Vince Carter's last minute offer.

The halftime show featured Mariah Carey wearing a dress in the style of Jordan's Wizards jersey who sang the song Hero, alongside a video montage celebrating Jordan's career. Afterwards, Carey introduced Jordan to a standing ovation from both the West and East all-stars and the crowd. Jordan thanked his former teammates, adversaries, family, and the fans for everything he had achieved in his career, ending with him saying that he can go home and be at peace with the game of basketball.

== All-Star Weekend ==
=== Slam Dunk Contest ===
Contestants
Pos.	Player	Team	Height	Weight	First round	Final round
G/F	Jason Richardson	Golden State Warriors	6–6	225	100	96
G/F	Desmond Mason	Seattle SuperSonics	6–5	222	90	93
F	Amare Stoudemire	Phoenix Suns	6-11	245	79	—
F	Richard Jefferson	New Jersey Nets	6–7	230	74	—

=== Three-Point Contest ===
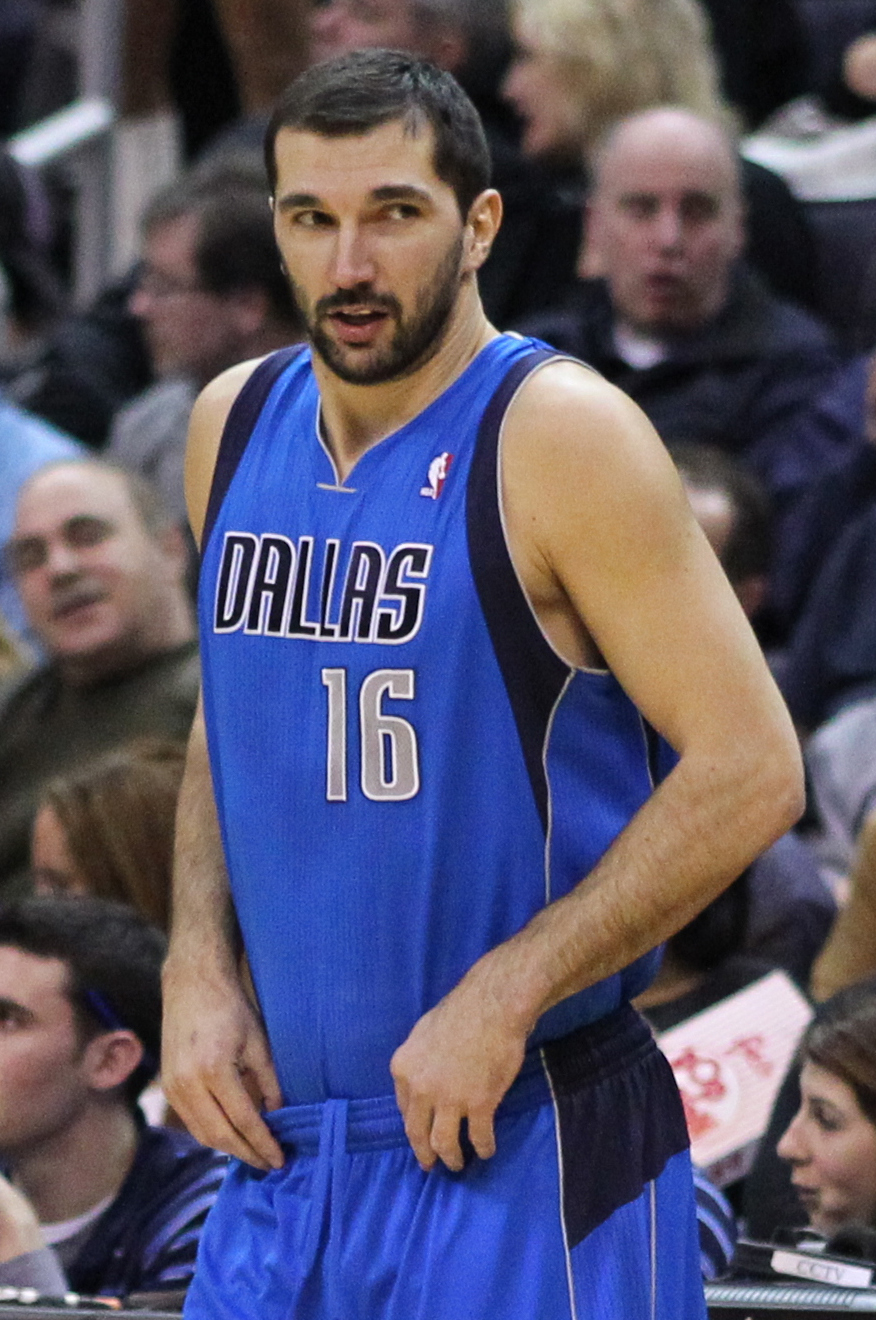
Peja Stojaković, of the Sacramento Kings, won his second 3-point title in a row.

Contestants
Pos.	Player	Team	Height	Weight	First round	Final round	Tiebreaker
F	Peja Stojaković	Sacramento Kings	6–10	229	19	20	22
G	Wesley Person	Memphis Grizzlies	6-6	195	14	20	16
G	Brent Barry	Seattle SuperSonics	6–7	210	19	17	—
F	Pat Garrity	Orlando Magic	6–9	238	13	—	—
G/F	David Wesley	New Orleans Hornets	6–1	203	12	—	—
F	Antoine Walker	Boston Celtics	6–9	265	7	—	—
