= 2002–03 Memphis Grizzlies season =

- Head coach: Sidney Lowe; Hubie Brown
- President: Jerry West
- General manager: Dick Versace
- Owner: Michael Heisley
- Arena: Pyramid Arena

Results
- Record: 28–54 (.341)
- Place: Division: 6th (Midwest); Conference: 12th (Western)
- Playoff finish: Did not qualify
- Stats at Basketball Reference

The 2002–03 Memphis Grizzlies season was the eighth season for the Memphis Grizzlies in the National Basketball Association, and their second season in Memphis, Tennessee.

== Season summary ==
=== Off-season ===
The Grizzlies received the fourth overall pick in the 2002 NBA draft, and selected power forward Drew Gooden from the University of Kansas. During the off-season, the team acquired rookie small forward Gordan Giriček from the San Antonio Spurs, acquired Wesley Person from the Cleveland Cavaliers on draft day, and signed free agents Earl Watson, and undrafted rookie power forward Mike Batiste.

For the season, the Grizzlies slightly updated their white home uniforms and black road uniforms, replacing their alternate logo of a brown grizzly bear with black shadows scratching a turquoise letter "G", with their primary logo of a grizzly bear holding a red basketball on the right leg of their shorts. These uniforms would remain in use until 2004.

=== Regular season ===
In their second season in Memphis, and despite the addition of Gooden, Giriček and Person, the Grizzlies continued to struggle losing their first eight games of the regular season. Head coach Sidney Lowe resigned after eight games, and was replaced with 69-year old Hubie Brown, who last coached the New York Knicks midway through the 1986–87 season. Under Brown, the Grizzlies lost their next five games, which led to a 13-game losing streak to start the season, before defeating the Washington Wizards at home, 85–74 at the Pyramid Arena on November 23, 2002. After a dreadful 2–18 start to the season, the Grizzlies won 9 of their next 13 games, but later on posted a seven-game losing streak between January and February, and held a 13–35 record at the All-Star break.

At mid-season, the team traded both Gooden, and Giriček to the Orlando Magic in exchange for Mike Miller, and rookie power forward Ryan Humphrey. After the All-Star break, the Grizzlies won 11 of their next 17 games, which included a six-game winning streak in March, but soon posted another seven-game losing streak between March and April, while losing 13 of their final 17 games of the season. The Grizzlies finished in sixth place in the Midwest Division with a 28–54 record, which was a five-game improvement over the previous season; however, for the eighth consecutive year, the franchise failed to reach 30 wins, or qualify for the NBA playoffs.

Second-year star Pau Gasol averaged 19.0 points, 8.8 rebounds and 1.8 blocks per game, while Miller averaged 12.8 points per game in 16 games after the trade, and Jason Williams provided the team with 12.1 points and 8.3 assists per game, and also led them with 143 three-point field goals. In addition, Lorenzen Wright provided with 11.4 points and 7.5 rebounds per game, while Person contributed 11.0 points per game and 100 three-point field goals, and second-year forward Shane Battier averaged 9.7 points and 1.3 steals per game. Meanwhile, Stromile Swift averaged 9.7 points, 5.7 rebounds and 1.6 blocks per game, Batiste provided with 6.4 points and 3.4 rebounds per game, Watson contributed 5.5 points and 2.8 assists per game, and Brevin Knight contributed 3.9 points, 4.2 assists and 1.3 steals per game.

During the NBA All-Star weekend at the Philips Arena in Atlanta, Georgia, and before the mid-season trade, Gasol, Gooden and Giriček were all selected for the NBA Rookie Challenge Game, as Gasol was a member of the Sophomores team, while Gooden and Giriček were both members of the Rookies team. Meanwhile, Person participated in the NBA Three-Point Shootout. Williams finished in seventh place in Most Improved Player voting, while Swift finished tied in 26th place, and Brown finished in seventh place in Coach of the Year voting.

The Grizzlies finished 24th in the NBA in home-game attendance, with an attendance of 611,322 at the Pyramid Arena during the regular season.

=== Aftermath ===
Following the season, Knight was traded to the Phoenix Suns, and Michael Dickerson retired after only five seasons in the NBA due to continuing injuries.

== Draft picks ==
Round	Pick	Player	Position	Nationality	College
1	4	Drew Gooden	PF/C	United States	Kansas
2	31	Robert Archibald	PF/C	United Kingdom	Illinois
2	45	Matt Barnes	SF	United States	UCLA

The franchise participated in the draft for the first time since relocating to Memphis. They entered the draft with one first-round pick and two second-round picks, one of which was acquired via trade with the Orlando Magic.

== Roster ==
2002–03 Memphis Grizzlies roster
Players

Pos.	No.	Player	Height	Weight	DOB	From
C	21	Robert Archibald	6 ft 11 in (2.11 m)	250 lb (113 kg)	1980–03–29	Illinois
F	24	Mike Batiste	6 ft 8 in (2.03 m)	225 lb (102 kg)	1977–11–21	Arizona State
G/F	31	Shane Battier	6 ft 8 in (2.03 m)	220 lb (100 kg)	1978–09–09	Duke
G	8	Michael Dickerson (injured)	6 ft 5 in (1.96 m)	190 lb (86 kg)	1975–06–25	Arizona
F/C	16	Pau Gasol	7 ft 0 in (2.13 m)	250 lb (113 kg)	1980–07–06	Spain
PF	40	Ryan Humphrey	6 ft 8 in (2.03 m)	235 lb (107 kg)	1979–07–24	Notre Dame
G	22	Brevin Knight	5 ft 10 in (1.78 m)	173 lb (78 kg)	1975–11–08	Stanford
G/F	33	Mike Miller (injured)	6 ft 8 in (2.03 m)	218 lb (99 kg)	1980–02–19	Florida
F	20	Chris Owens	6 ft 7 in (2.01 m)	245 lb (111 kg)	1979–03–01	Texas
G	1	Wesley Person	6 ft 6 in (1.98 m)	195 lb (88 kg)	1971–03–28	Auburn
F	4	Stromile Swift	6 ft 9 in (2.06 m)	225 lb (102 kg)	1979–11–21	LSU
C	15	Cezary Trybański	7 ft 2 in (2.18 m)	240 lb (109 kg)	1979–09–22	Poland
PG	25	Earl Watson	6 ft 1 in (1.85 m)	195 lb (88 kg)	1979–06–12	UCLA
PG	2	Jason Williams	6 ft 1 in (1.85 m)	180 lb (82 kg)	1975–11–18	Florida
C	42	Lorenzen Wright (injured)	6 ft 11 in (2.11 m)	255 lb (116 kg)	1975–11–04	Memphis

Coaches
Head coach
- Hubie Brown
Assistant(s)
- Mitchell Anderson
- Tony Barone
- Brendan Brown
- Lionel Hollins
- Scott Roth
- Hal Wissel

Legend
- (DP) Unsigned draft pick
- (FA) Free agent
- (S) Suspended
- Injured

Roster

== Regular season ==
=== Season standings ===
Midwest Division	W	L	PCT	GB	Home	Road	Div
y-San Antonio Spurs	60	22	.732	–	33–8	27–14	17–7
x-Dallas Mavericks	60	22	.732	–	33–8	27–14	18–6
x-Minnesota Timberwolves	51	31	.622	9	33–8	18–23	15–9
x-Utah Jazz	47	35	.573	13	29–12	18–23	15–9
e-Houston Rockets	43	39	.524	17	28–13	15–26	11–13
e-Memphis Grizzlies	28	54	.341	32	20–21	8–33	5–17
e-Denver Nuggets	17	65	.207	43	13–28	4–37	3–21

#	Western Conference				
#	Team	W	L	PCT	GB
1	z-San Antonio Spurs	60	22	.732	–
2	y-Sacramento Kings	59	23	.720	1
3	x-Dallas Mavericks	60	22	.732	–
4	x-Minnesota Timberwolves	51	31	.622	9
5	x-Los Angeles Lakers	50	32	.610	10
6	x-Portland Trail Blazers	50	32	.610	10
7	x-Utah Jazz	47	35	.573	13
8	x-Phoenix Suns	44	38	.537	16
9	e-Houston Rockets	43	39	.524	17
10	e-Seattle SuperSonics	40	42	.488	20
11	e-Golden State Warriors	38	44	.463	22
12	e-Memphis Grizzlies	28	54	.341	32
13	e-Los Angeles Clippers	27	55	.329	33
14	e-Denver Nuggets	17	65	.207	43

z - clinched division title
y - clinched division title
x - clinched playoff spot

== Player statistics ==
=== Regular season ===
Player	POS	GP	GS	MP	REB	AST	STL	BLK	PTS	MPG	RPG	APG	SPG	BPG	PPG
Pau Gasol	PF	82	82	2,948	720	229	34	148	1,555	36.0	8.8	2.8	.4	1.8	19.0
Earl Watson	PG	79	2	1,366	164	225	89	14	433	17.3	2.1	2.8	1.1	.2	5.5
Shane Battier	SF	78	47	2,383	345	105	102	88	756	30.6	4.4	1.3	1.3	1.1	9.7
Jason Williams	PG	76	76	2,407	212	631	91	10	919	31.7	2.8	8.3	1.2	.1	12.1
Michael Batiste	PF	75	2	1,248	257	52	42	16	481	16.6	3.4	.7	.6	.2	6.4
Lorenzen Wright	C	70	49	1,982	528	80	51	54	797	28.3	7.5	1.1	.7	.8	11.4
Stromile Swift	PF	67	26	1,478	384	45	55	104	647	22.1	5.7	.7	.8	1.6	9.7
Wesley Person	SG	66	44	1,941	192	112	42	19	727	29.4	2.9	1.7	.6	.3	11.0
Brevin Knight	PG	55	4	928	81	233	69	2	216	16.9	1.5	4.2	1.3	.0	3.9
Drew Gooden^{†}	SF	51	29	1,329	295	63	38	22	616	26.1	5.8	1.2	.7	.4	12.1
Gordan Giriček^{†}	SG	49	35	1,187	108	70	22	6	548	24.2	2.2	1.4	.4	.1	11.2
Mike Miller^{†}	SF	16	13	360	55	31	6	5	205	22.5	3.4	1.9	.4	.3	12.8
Cezary Trybański	C	15	0	86	14	1	0	6	14	5.7	.9	.1	.0	.4	.9
Ryan Humphrey^{†}	PF	13	0	122	30	4	5	2	29	9.4	2.3	.3	.4	.2	2.2
Robert Archibald	PF	12	0	72	17	3	0	3	19	6.0	1.4	.3	.0	.3	1.6
Michael Dickerson	SG	6	1	87	6	8	5	1	29	14.5	1.0	1.3	.8	.2	4.8
Chris Owens	SF	1	0	6	1	0	0	0	4	6.0	1.0	.0	.0	.0	4.0

- ^{†} Denotes player spent time with another team in the season. Stats reflect time with the Grizzlies only.

== Awards and records ==
- Gordan Giricek, NBA All-Rookie Team 2nd Team

== See also ==
- 2002-03 NBA season
