= 2002–03 Portland Trail Blazers season =

NBA professional basketball team season

- Head coach: Maurice Cheeks
- General manager: Bob Whitsitt
- Owner: Paul Allen
- Arena: Rose Garden Arena

Results
- Record: 50–32 (.610)
- Place: Division: 3rd (Pacific); Conference: 6th (Western)
- Playoff finish: First round (lost to Mavericks 3–4)
- Stats at Basketball Reference

Local media
- Television: KGW; Fox Sports Net Northwest
- Radio: KXL

The 2002–03 Portland Trail Blazers season was the 33rd season for the Portland Trail Blazers in the National Basketball Association.

== Season summary ==
=== Off-season ===
During the off-season, the Trail Blazers acquired Antonio Daniels from the San Antonio Spurs, and signed free agent Jeff McInnis. Former Trail Blazers center Arvydas Sabonis came out of his retirement, and returned to play for the team after a one-year absence.

For the season, the Trail Blazers redesigned their primary logo, adding silver to their color scheme of black, red and white. The team's primary logo featured five white lines, and five red lines curling into each other with black outlines. Underneath the logo featured the team nickname "Blazers" in thin black letters with red shadows. The team also slightly redesigned their white home uniforms and black road uniforms. The uniforms featured a red and silver trim, a silver outline underneath the stripes across their jerseys, and on the left leg of their shorts next to the side panels; the right leg features the team's new primary logo of the curling lines. The home uniforms featured the team nickname "Blazers" in black letters with red shadows and a silver outline, while the road uniforms featured the team nickname in white letters with black shadows and a red outline.

The team's new primary logo only lasted for just one season; meanwhile, the new home uniforms would remain in use until 2017, and the new road uniforms would last until 2005, where they would replace the team nickname "Blazers" with the city name "Portland".

=== Regular season ===
The Trail Blazers got off to a slow start by losing six of their first nine games of the regular season. However, after a 10–11 start to the season, the team posted an eight-game winning streak in December, and later on held a 32–16 record at the All-Star break. The Trail Blazers played around .500 in winning percentage by posting an 18–16 record for the remainder of the season, finishing in third place in the Pacific Division with a solid 50–32 record, and earning the sixth seed in the Western Conference; the team qualified for the NBA playoffs for the 21st consecutive year, and also for the 26th time in the last 27 seasons.

Rasheed Wallace averaged 18.1 points and 7.4 rebounds per game, and contributed 110 three-point field goals, while Bonzi Wells averaged 15.2 points, 5.3 rebounds and 1.6 steals per game, and Derek Anderson provided the team with 13.9 points and 4.3 assists per game, and also led them with 116 three-point field goals. In addition, Scottie Pippen contributed 10.8 points, 4.5 assists and 1.6 steals per game, while second-year forward Zach Randolph provided with 8.4 points and 4.5 rebounds per game, and Ruben Patterson contributed 8.3 points per game. Meanwhile, Dale Davis averaged 7.4 points and 7.2 rebounds per game, Damon Stoudamire played half of the season off the bench, averaging 6.9 points and 3.5 assists per game, Sabonis provided with 6.1 points and 4.3 rebounds per game, and McInnis contributed 5.8 points per game.

Head coach Maurice Cheeks finished in tenth place in Coach of the Year voting. The Trail Blazers finished sixth in the NBA in home-game attendance, with an attendance of 796,258 at the Rose Garden Arena during the regular season.

=== NBA playoffs ===
In the Western Conference First Round of the 2003 NBA playoffs, the Trail Blazers faced off against the 3rd–seeded Dallas Mavericks, who were led by the trio of All-Star forward Dirk Nowitzki, All-Star guard Steve Nash, and Michael Finley. The Trail Blazers faced elimination after losing the first three games to the Mavericks; the team lost the first two games on the road at the American Airlines Center, before losing Game 3 at home at the Rose Garden Arena, 115–103 as the Mavericks took a 3–0 series lead. Despite the threat of elimination, the Trail Blazers managed to win the next three games, which included a Game 6 win over the Mavericks at the Rose Garden Arena, 125–103 to even the series. However, the Trail Blazers lost Game 7 to the Mavericks at the American Airlines Center, 107–95, thus losing in a hard-fought seven-game series.

As of 2026, the Trail Blazers remained the last team to force a Game 7 after trailing 3–0 in a best-of-seven series, until the 2022–23 Boston Celtics in the Eastern Conference Finals against the Miami Heat, and after the 1950–51 New York Knicks in the NBA Finals, and the 1993–94 Denver Nuggets in the Western Conference Semi-finals; although no team has ever come back to win an NBA playoff series after trailing 3–0. This season would also be the last time that the Trail Blazers qualified for the NBA playoffs until the 2008–09 season, as the team's historic postseason streak would end in the following season with a mediocre 41–41 record.

=== Aftermath ===
Following the season, Pippen re-signed as a free agent with his former team, the Chicago Bulls, after four seasons with the Trail Blazers, while Daniels signed with the Seattle SuperSonics, and Sabonis retired for the second time.

== Draft picks ==
Round	Pick	Player	Position	Nationality	School/Club team
1	21	Qyntel Woods	F	United States	NE Mississippi CC
2	43	Jason Jennings	C	United States	Arkansas State
2	51	Federico Kammerichs	F	Argentina	Ourense (Spain)

== Roster ==
2002–03 Portland Trail Blazers roster
Players

Pos.	No.	Player	Height	Weight	DOB	From
G/F	1	Derek Anderson	6 ft 5 in (1.96 m)	194 lb (88 kg)	1974–07–18	Kentucky
C	44	Ruben Boumtje-Boumtje (injured)	7 ft 0 in (2.13 m)	257 lb (117 kg)	1978–05–20	Georgetown
G	10	Antonio Daniels	6 ft 4 in (1.93 m)	195 lb (88 kg)	1975–03–19	Bowling Green
F/C	34	Dale Davis	6 ft 11 in (2.11 m)	230 lb (104 kg)	1969–03–25	Clemson
C	14	Chris Dudley	6 ft 11 in (2.11 m)	235 lb (107 kg)	1965–02–22	Yale
G	5	Jeff McInnis	6 ft 4 in (1.93 m)	190 lb (86 kg)	1974–10–22	North Carolina
G/F	21	Ruben Patterson	6 ft 5 in (1.96 m)	224 lb (102 kg)	1975–07–31	Cincinnati
F	33	Scottie Pippen	6 ft 8 in (2.03 m)	210 lb (95 kg)	1965–09–25	Central Arkansas
F/C	50	Zach Randolph	6 ft 9 in (2.06 m)	260 lb (118 kg)	1981–07–16	Michigan State
C	11	Arvydas Sabonis	7 ft 3 in (2.21 m)	279 lb (127 kg)	1964–12–19	Lithuania
G	7	Charles Smith (injured)	6 ft 4 in (1.93 m)	194 lb (88 kg)	1975–08–22	New Mexico
G	3	Damon Stoudamire	5 ft 10 in (1.78 m)	171 lb (78 kg)	1973–09–03	Arizona
F/C	30	Rasheed Wallace	6 ft 10 in (2.08 m)	225 lb (102 kg)	1974–09–17	North Carolina
G/F	6	Bonzi Wells	6 ft 5 in (1.96 m)	210 lb (95 kg)	1976–09–28	Ball State
F	24	Qyntel Woods	6 ft 8 in (2.03 m)	221 lb (100 kg)	1981–02–16	Northeast Mississippi CC

Coaches
Head coach
- Maurice Cheeks
Assistant(s)
- Herb Brown
- Caldwell Jones
- Jim Lynam
- Dan Panaggio

Legend
- (DP) Unsigned draft pick
- (FA) Free agent
- (S) Suspended
- Injured

Roster

== Regular season ==
=== Season standings ===
Pacific Division	W	L	PCT	GB	Home	Road	Div
y-Sacramento Kings	59	23	.720	–	35–6	24–17	17–7
x-Los Angeles Lakers	50	32	.610	9	31–10	19–22	15–9
x-Portland Trail Blazers	50	32	.610	9	27–14	23–18	15–9
x-Phoenix Suns	44	38	.537	15	30–11	14–27	12–12
e-Seattle SuperSonics	40	42	.488	19	25–16	15–26	11–13
e-Golden State Warriors	38	44	.463	21	24–17	14–27	8–16
e-Los Angeles Clippers	27	55	.329	32	16–25	11–30	6–18

#	Western Conference				
#	Team	W	L	PCT	GB
1	z-San Antonio Spurs	60	22	.732	–
2	y-Sacramento Kings	59	23	.720	1
3	x-Dallas Mavericks	60	22	.732	–
4	x-Minnesota Timberwolves	51	31	.622	9
5	x-Los Angeles Lakers	50	32	.610	10
6	x-Portland Trail Blazers	50	32	.610	10
7	x-Utah Jazz	47	35	.573	13
8	x-Phoenix Suns	44	38	.537	16
9	e-Houston Rockets	43	39	.524	17
10	e-Seattle SuperSonics	40	42	.488	20
11	e-Golden State Warriors	38	44	.463	22
12	e-Memphis Grizzlies	28	54	.341	32
13	e-Los Angeles Clippers	27	55	.329	33
14	e-Denver Nuggets	17	65	.207	43

z - clinched division title
y - clinched division title
x - clinched playoff spot

== Playoffs ==
2003 playoff game log
First round: 3–4 (home: 2–1; road: 1–3)

Game	Date	Team	Score	High points	High rebounds	High assists	Location Attendance	Series
1	April 19	@ Dallas	L 86–96	Rasheed Wallace (26)	Davis, Wells (10)	Scottie Pippen (5)	American Airlines Center; 20,336	0–1
2	April 23	@ Dallas	L 99–103	Bonzi Wells (45)	Dale Davis (15)	Damon Stoudamire (5)	American Airlines Center; 20,356	0–2
3	April 25	Dallas	L 103–115	Ruben Patterson (19)	Zach Randolph (10)	Bonzi Wells (6)	Rose Garden; 19,980	0–3
4	April 27	Dallas	W 98–79	Zach Randolph (25)	Zach Randolph (15)	Damon Stoudamire (11)	Rose Garden; 19,980	1–3
5	April 30	@ Dallas	W 103–99	Zach Randolph (22)	Zach Randolph (9)	Bonzi Wells (7)	American Airlines Center; 20,438	2–3
6	May 2	Dallas	W 125–103	Zach Randolph (21)	Zach Randolph (10)	McInnis, Wallace (6)	Rose Garden; 20,602	3–3
7	May 4	@ Dallas	L 95–107	Stoudamire, Wallace (17)	Zach Randolph (10)	Damon Stoudamire (9)	American Airlines Center; 20,281	3–4

2003 schedule

== Player statistics ==
Legend
GP	Games played	GS	Games started	MPG	Minutes per game
FG%	Field-goal percentage	3P%	3-point field-goal percentage	FT%	Free-throw percentage
RPG	Rebounds per game	APG	Assists per game	SPG	Steals per game
BPG	Blocks per game	PPG	Points per game

=== Regular season ===
Player	GP	GS	MPG	FG%	3P%	FT%	RPG	APG	SPG	BPG	PPG
Dale Davis	78	78	29.3	.541		.633	7.2	1.2	.7	.9	7.4
Ruben Patterson	78	17	21.2	.492	.150	.627	3.4	1.3	.9	.4	8.3
Arvydas Sabonis	78	1	15.5	.476	.500	.787	4.3	1.8	.8	.6	6.1
Zach Randolph	77	11	16.9	.513	.000	.758	4.5	.5	.5	.2	8.4
Derek Anderson	76	76	33.6	.427	.350	.859	3.5	4.3	1.2	.2	13.9
Bonzi Wells	75	65	31.9	.441	.292	.722	5.3	3.3	1.6	.2	15.2
Jeff McInnis	75	1	17.5	.444	.171	.746	1.3	2.3	.3	.0	5.8
Rasheed Wallace	74	74	36.3	.471	.358	.735	7.4	2.1	.9	1.0	18.1
Antonio Daniels	67	2	13.0	.452	.305	.855	1.1	1.3	.5	.1	3.7
Scottie Pippen	64	58	29.9	.444	.286	.818	4.3	4.5	1.6	.4	10.8
Damon Stoudamire	59	27	22.3	.376	.386	.791	2.6	3.5	.7	.1	6.9
Qyntel Woods	53	0	6.3	.500	.333	.350	1.0	.2	.3	.0	2.4
Charles Smith	3	0	4.3	.250	.000	.750	.0	.3	.3	.0	1.7
Chris Dudley	3	0	3.7	.000			.7	.0	.0	.0	.0
Ruben Boumtje-Boumtje	2	0	2.5	.000			.5	.5	.5	.0	.0

=== Playoffs ===
Player	GP	GS	MPG	FG%	3P%	FT%	RPG	APG	SPG	BPG	PPG
Bonzi Wells	7	7	38.3	.395	.300	.667	6.9	3.7	2.1	.4	19.0
Rasheed Wallace	7	7	37.1	.454	.400	.714	5.1	2.6	.6	.7	17.4
Damon Stoudamire	7	6	33.1	.456	.484	.952	5.1	5.6	.9	.3	15.3
Zach Randolph	7	4	29.3	.525		.892	8.7	1.6	.4	.3	13.9
Ruben Patterson	7	0	22.1	.481	.000	.690	3.7	1.6	.6	.1	10.0
Jeff McInnis	7	0	14.1	.346	.000	.750	1.7	2.7	.3	.1	3.0
Dale Davis	6	6	27.0	.583		.654	8.0	1.5	.8	.3	7.5
Antonio Daniels	6	1	16.3	.474	.600	.500	1.3	2.0	.2	.2	3.7
Arvydas Sabonis	6	1	14.3	.667		.800	4.0	.8	.7	.7	10.0
Scottie Pippen	4	1	18.8	.409	.333	1.000	2.8	3.3	.0	.0	5.8
Qyntel Woods	4	0	4.5	.333	.000	.500	.5	.0	.0	.0	1.8
Derek Anderson	2	2	11.0	.250	.000	.000	.5	.0	.0	.0	1.0

- ^{†} Denotes player spent time with another team in the season. Stats reflect time with the Trail Blazers only.

Player statistics citation:

== Transactions ==
=== Overview ===
Players Added

Via draft

- Qyntel Woods

Via trade

- Antonio Daniels

Via free agency

- Jeff McInnis
Players Lost

Via trade

- Steve Kerr

Via free agency

Player Transactions Citation:
