= 2002–03 Minnesota Timberwolves season =

NBA professional basketball team season

- Head coach: Flip Saunders
- General manager: Kevin McHale
- Owner: Glen Taylor
- Arena: Target Center

Results
- Record: 51–31 (.622)
- Place: Division: 3rd (Midwest); Conference: 4th (Western)
- Playoff finish: First round (lost to Lakers 2–4)
- Stats at Basketball Reference

Local media
- Television: KMSP-TV; WFTC; Fox Sports Net North
- Radio: WFAN

The 2002–03 Minnesota Timberwolves season was the 14th season for the Minnesota Timberwolves in the National Basketball Association.

== Season summary ==
=== Off-season ===
During the off-season, the Timberwolves signed free agents Troy Hudson, Kendall Gill and Rod Strickland. However, prior to the start of the regular season, the team lost both Terrell Brandon, and Felipe López for the entire season due to knee injuries.

=== Regular season ===
With the addition of Hudson, Gill and Strickland, and despite the loss of Brandon and López, the Timberwolves played around .500 in winning percentage with a 9–8 record in November. The team posted two six-game winning streaks in January and February, while posting a 12–1 record in February, and holding a 29–20 record at the All-Star break. The Timberwolves posted a seven-game winning streak between February and March, and finished in third place in the Midwest Division with a 51–31 record, earning the fourth seed in the Western Conference; the team qualified for the NBA playoffs for the seventh consecutive year.

Kevin Garnett averaged 23.0 points, 13.4 rebounds, 6.0 assists, 1.4 steals and 1.6 blocks per game, and was named to the All-NBA First Team, and to the NBA All-Defensive First Team. In addition, Wally Szczerbiak averaged 17.6 points per game, but only played 52 games due to injury, while Hudson provided the team with 14.2 points and 5.7 assists per game, Rasho Nesterovic provided with 11.2 points, 6.5 rebounds and 1.5 blocks per game, and Gill contributed 8.7 points per game. Meanwhile, Anthony Peeler contributed 7.7 points per game, Joe Smith averaged 7.5 points and 5.0 rebounds per game, Strickland provided with 6.8 points and 4.6 assists per game, and Gary Trent contributed 6.0 points and 3.6 rebounds per game.

During the NBA All-Star weekend at the Philips Arena in Atlanta, Georgia, Garnett was selected for the 2003 NBA All-Star Game, as a member of the Western Conference All-Star team. Garnett scored 37 points along with 9 rebounds and 5 steals, and was named the NBA All-Star Game Most Valuable Player, as the Western Conference defeated the Eastern Conference in double-overtime, 155–145. Garnett finished in second place in Most Valuable Player voting, behind Tim Duncan of the San Antonio Spurs with 43 first-place votes, and also finished in third place in Defensive Player of the Year voting; Hudson finished in ninth place in Most Improved Player voting, while Garnett finished tied in 21st place, and Nesterovic finished tied in 26th place, and head coach Flip Saunders finished in fifth place in Coach of the Year voting.

The Timberwolves finished 18th in the NBA in home-game attendance, with an attendance of 643,684 at the Target Center during the regular season.

=== NBA playoffs ===
In the Western Conference First Round of the 2003 NBA playoffs, the Timberwolves faced off against the 5th–seeded, and 3-time defending NBA champion Los Angeles Lakers, who were led by All-Star guard Kobe Bryant, All-Star center Shaquille O'Neal, and Derek Fisher. The Timberwolves lost Game 1 to the Lakers at home, 117–98 at the Target Center, but managed to win the next two games, which included a Game 3 road win over the Lakers at the Staples Center in overtime, 114–110 to take a 2–1 series lead. However, the Timberwolves lost the next three games, including a Game 6 loss to the Lakers at the Staples Center, 101–85, thus losing the series in six games; it was the seventh consecutive year that the Timberwolves lost in the opening round of the NBA playoffs.

=== Aftermath ===
Following the season, Smith was traded to the Milwaukee Bucks, while Peeler signed as a free agent with the Sacramento Kings, and Gill signed with the Chicago Bulls. Meanwhile, Brandon was traded to the Atlanta Hawks in a four-team trade, and Strickland was released to free agency.

== Draft picks ==
| Round | Pick | Player | Position | Nationality | College |
|---|---|---|---|---|---|
| 1 | 29 | Forfeited pick | | | |
| 2 | 52 | Marcus Taylor | PG | United States | Michigan State |

== Roster ==
2002–03 Minnesota Timberwolves roster
Players

| Pos. | No. | Player | Height | Weight | DOB | From |
|---|---|---|---|---|---|---|
| G | 7 | Terrell Brandon (IN) | 5 ft 11 in (1.80 m) | 180 lb (82 kg) | 1970–05–20 | Oregon |
| F | 21 | Kevin Garnett | 6 ft 11 in (2.11 m) | 220 lb (100 kg) | 1976–05–19 | Farragut Academy (IL) |
| G | 9 | Kendall Gill | 6 ft 5 in (1.96 m) | 195 lb (88 kg) | 1968–05–25 | Illinois |
| G | 16 | Troy Hudson | 6 ft 1 in (1.85 m) | 170 lb (77 kg) | 1976–03–13 | Southern Illinois |
| C | 25 | Marc Jackson | 6 ft 10 in (2.08 m) | 270 lb (122 kg) | 1975–01–16 | Temple |
| G | 13 | Felipe López (IN) | 6 ft 5 in (1.96 m) | 180 lb (82 kg) | 1974–12–19 | St. John's |
| C | 8 | Rasho Nesterović | 7 ft 0 in (2.13 m) | 255 lb (116 kg) | 1976–05–30 | Slovenia |
| G | 44 | Anthony Peeler | 6 ft 4 in (1.93 m) | 208 lb (94 kg) | 1969–11–25 | Missouri |
| G | 36 | Igor Rakocevic | 6 ft 3 in (1.91 m) | 183 lb (83 kg) | 1978–03–29 | Serbia |
| F | 32 | Joe Smith | 6 ft 10 in (2.08 m) | 225 lb (102 kg) | 1975–07–26 | Maryland |
| G | 1 | Rod Strickland | 6 ft 3 in (1.91 m) | 175 lb (79 kg) | 1966–07–11 | DePaul |
| F | 10 | Wally Szczerbiak | 6 ft 7 in (2.01 m) | 244 lb (111 kg) | 1977–03–05 | Miami (OH) |
| F | 20 | Gary Trent | 6 ft 8 in (2.03 m) | 250 lb (113 kg) | 1974–09–22 | Ohio |
| G | 29 | Mike Wilks | 5 ft 10 in (1.78 m) | 180 lb (82 kg) | 1979–05–07 | Rice |
| C | 3 | Loren Woods | 7 ft 2 in (2.18 m) | 260 lb (118 kg) | 1978–06–21 | Arizona |

Coaches
Head coach
- Flip Saunders
Assistant(s)
- Greg Ballard
- Jerry Sichting
- Randy Wittman
- Don Zierden
- Gregg Farnam (trainer)

Legend
- (DP) Unsigned draft pick
- (FA) Free agent
- (S) Suspended
- (IN) Inactive
- Injured

Roster
Updated: February 12, 2003

=== Roster notes ===
- Point guard Terrell Brandon was on the injured reserve list due to a knee injury, and missed the entire regular season.
- Shooting guard Felipe Lopez was on the injured reserve list due to a torn ACL, and MCL in his left knee, and missed the entire regular season.

== Regular season ==
=== Season standings ===
| Midwest Division | W | L | PCT | GB | Home | Road | Div |
|---|---|---|---|---|---|---|---|
| y-San Antonio Spurs | 60 | 22 | .732 | – | 33–8 | 27–14 | 17–7 |
| x-Dallas Mavericks | 60 | 22 | .732 | – | 33–8 | 27–14 | 18–6 |
| x-Minnesota Timberwolves | 51 | 31 | .622 | 9 | 33–8 | 18–23 | 15–9 |
| x-Utah Jazz | 47 | 35 | .573 | 13 | 29–12 | 18–23 | 15–9 |
| e-Houston Rockets | 43 | 39 | .524 | 17 | 28–13 | 15–26 | 11–13 |
| e-Memphis Grizzlies | 28 | 54 | .341 | 32 | 20–21 | 8–33 | 5–17 |
| e-Denver Nuggets | 17 | 65 | .207 | 43 | 13–28 | 4–37 | 3–21 |

| # | Western Conference | | | | |
| # | Team | W | L | PCT | GB |
|---|---|---|---|---|---|
| 1 | z-San Antonio Spurs | 60 | 22 | .732 | – |
| 2 | y-Sacramento Kings | 59 | 23 | .720 | 1 |
| 3 | x-Dallas Mavericks | 60 | 22 | .732 | – |
| 4 | x-Minnesota Timberwolves | 51 | 31 | .622 | 9 |
| 5 | x-Los Angeles Lakers | 50 | 32 | .610 | 10 |
| 6 | x-Portland Trail Blazers | 50 | 32 | .610 | 10 |
| 7 | x-Utah Jazz | 47 | 35 | .573 | 13 |
| 8 | x-Phoenix Suns | 44 | 38 | .537 | 16 |
| 9 | e-Houston Rockets | 43 | 39 | .524 | 17 |
| 10 | e-Seattle SuperSonics | 40 | 42 | .488 | 20 |
| 11 | e-Golden State Warriors | 38 | 44 | .463 | 22 |
| 12 | e-Memphis Grizzlies | 28 | 54 | .341 | 32 |
| 13 | e-Los Angeles Clippers | 27 | 55 | .329 | 33 |
| 14 | e-Denver Nuggets | 17 | 65 | .207 | 43 |

z - clinched division title
y - clinched division title
x - clinched playoff spot

== Playoffs ==
2003 playoff game log
First round: 2–4 (home: 1–2; road: 1–2)

| Game | Date | Team | Score | High points | High rebounds | High assists | Location Attendance | Series |
|---|---|---|---|---|---|---|---|---|
| 1 | April 20 | L.A. Lakers | L 98–117 | Kevin Garnett (23) | Kevin Garnett (14) | Kevin Garnett (7) | Target Center; 17,097 | 0–1 |
| 2 | April 22 | L.A. Lakers | W 119–91 | Troy Hudson (37) | Kevin Garnett (20) | Troy Hudson (10) | Target Center; 17,132 | 1–1 |
| 3 | April 24 | @ L.A. Lakers | W 114–110 (OT) | Kevin Garnett (33) | Kevin Garnett (14) | Rod Strickland (7) | Staples Center; 18,997 | 2–1 |
| 4 | April 27 | @ L.A. Lakers | L 97–102 | Garnett, Hudson (28) | Kevin Garnett (18) | Kevin Garnett (5) | Staples Center; 18,997 | 2–2 |
| 5 | April 29 | L.A. Lakers | L 90–120 | Kevin Garnett (25) | Kevin Garnett (16) | Troy Hudson (7) | Target Center; 20,098 | 2–3 |
| 6 | May 1 | @ L.A. Lakers | L 85–101 | Garnett, Hudson (18) | Kevin Garnett (12) | Garnett, Szczerbiak (5) | Staples Center; 18,997 | 2–4 |

2003 schedule

== Player statistics ==
=== Regular season ===
| Player | POS | GP | GS | MP | REB | AST | STL | BLK | PTS | MPG | RPG | APG | SPG | BPG | PPG |
|---|---|---|---|---|---|---|---|---|---|---|---|---|---|---|---|
| Kevin Garnett | PF | 82 | 82 | 3,321 | 1,102 | 495 | 113 | 129 | 1,883 | 40.5 | 13.4 | 6.0 | 1.4 | 1.6 | 23.0 |
| Anthony Peeler | SG | 82 | 39 | 2,245 | 241 | 244 | 72 | 13 | 630 | 27.4 | 2.9 | 3.0 | .9 | .2 | 7.7 |
| Kendall Gill | SG | 82 | 34 | 2,068 | 248 | 156 | 78 | 15 | 714 | 25.2 | 3.0 | 1.9 | 1.0 | .2 | 8.7 |
| Gary Trent | SF | 80 | 22 | 1,222 | 291 | 77 | 32 | 23 | 476 | 15.3 | 3.6 | 1.0 | .4 | .3 | 6.0 |
| Troy Hudson | PG | 79 | 74 | 2,600 | 183 | 452 | 60 | 7 | 1,123 | 32.9 | 2.3 | 5.7 | .8 | .1 | 14.2 |
| Rasho Nesterović | C | 77 | 77 | 2,337 | 504 | 114 | 39 | 116 | 861 | 30.4 | 6.5 | 1.5 | .5 | 1.5 | 11.2 |
| Marc Jackson | C | 77 | 0 | 1,041 | 225 | 37 | 24 | 30 | 421 | 13.5 | 2.9 | .5 | .3 | .4 | 5.5 |
| Joe Smith | SF | 54 | 21 | 1,117 | 270 | 38 | 14 | 55 | 404 | 20.7 | 5.0 | .7 | .3 | 1.0 | 7.5 |
| Wally Szczerbiak | SF | 52 | 42 | 1,836 | 241 | 136 | 44 | 22 | 913 | 35.3 | 4.6 | 2.6 | .8 | .4 | 17.6 |
| Rod Strickland | PG | 47 | 8 | 956 | 95 | 215 | 46 | 6 | 320 | 20.3 | 2.0 | 4.6 | 1.0 | .1 | 6.8 |
| Igor Rakočević | PG | 42 | 0 | 244 | 17 | 33 | 4 | 0 | 78 | 5.8 | .4 | .8 | .1 | .0 | 1.9 |
| Loren Woods | C | 38 | 11 | 353 | 95 | 19 | 10 | 13 | 80 | 9.3 | 2.5 | .5 | .3 | .3 | 2.1 |
| Mike Wilks^{†} | PG | 31 | 0 | 324 | 30 | 50 | 11 | 3 | 62 | 10.5 | 1.0 | 1.6 | .4 | .1 | 2.0 |
| Reggie Slater | PF | 26 | 0 | 141 | 31 | 4 | 6 | 1 | 81 | 5.4 | 1.2 | .2 | .2 | .0 | 3.1 |

- ^{†} Denotes player spent time with another team in the season. Stats reflect time with the Timberwolves only.

=== Playoffs ===
| Player | POS | GP | GS | MP | REB | AST | STL | BLK | PTS | MPG | RPG | APG | SPG | BPG | PPG |
|---|---|---|---|---|---|---|---|---|---|---|---|---|---|---|---|
| Kevin Garnett | PF | 6 | 6 | 265 | 94 | 31 | 10 | 10 | 162 | 44.2 | 15.7 | 5.2 | 1.7 | 1.7 | 27.0 |
| Wally Szczerbiak | SF | 6 | 6 | 252 | 30 | 13 | 6 | 1 | 87 | 42.0 | 5.0 | 2.2 | 1.0 | .2 | 14.5 |
| Troy Hudson | PG | 6 | 6 | 221 | 12 | 33 | 8 | 0 | 141 | 36.8 | 2.0 | 5.5 | 1.3 | .0 | 23.5 |
| Rasho Nesterović | C | 6 | 6 | 169 | 30 | 4 | 1 | 4 | 42 | 28.2 | 5.0 | .7 | .2 | .7 | 7.0 |
| Anthony Peeler | SG | 6 | 5 | 166 | 21 | 18 | 4 | 1 | 29 | 27.7 | 3.5 | 3.0 | .7 | .2 | 4.8 |
| Kendall Gill | SG | 6 | 0 | 118 | 13 | 7 | 4 | 1 | 31 | 19.7 | 2.2 | 1.2 | .7 | .2 | 5.2 |
| Marc Jackson | C | 6 | 0 | 110 | 33 | 8 | 2 | 1 | 50 | 18.3 | 5.5 | 1.3 | .3 | .2 | 8.3 |
| Rod Strickland | PG | 6 | 0 | 73 | 6 | 17 | 4 | 2 | 28 | 12.2 | 1.0 | 2.8 | .7 | .3 | 4.7 |
| Gary Trent | SF | 6 | 0 | 42 | 7 | 1 | 1 | 0 | 14 | 7.0 | 1.2 | .2 | .2 | .0 | 2.3 |
| Joe Smith | SF | 5 | 1 | 40 | 6 | 0 | 1 | 1 | 14 | 8.0 | 1.2 | .0 | .2 | .2 | 2.8 |
| Mike Wilks | PG | 4 | 0 | 7 | 0 | 0 | 0 | 0 | 3 | 1.8 | .0 | .0 | .0 | .0 | .8 |
| Loren Woods | C | 2 | 0 | 2 | 1 | 0 | 0 | 0 | 2 | 1.0 | .5 | .0 | .0 | .0 | 1.0 |

== Awards and records ==
- Kevin Garnett, All-NBA First Team
- Kevin Garnett, NBA All-Defensive First Team
- Kevin Garnett, NBA All-Star Game Most Valuable Player Award

== See also ==
- 2002-03 NBA season
