= 2002–03 Denver Nuggets season =

NBA professional basketball team season

- Head coach: Jeff Bzdelik
- General manager: Kiki VanDeWeghe
- Owner: Stan Kroenke
- Arena: Pepsi Center

Results
- Record: 17–65 (.207)
- Place: Division: 7th (Midwest); Conference: 14th (Western)
- Playoff finish: Did not qualify
- Stats at Basketball Reference

Local media
- Television: KTVD; Fox Sports Net Rocky Mountain
- Radio: KKFN

The 2002–03 Denver Nuggets season was the 27th season for the Denver Nuggets in the National Basketball Association, and their 36th season as a franchise.

== Season summary ==
=== Off-season ===
The Nuggets received the fifth overall pick in the 2002 NBA draft, and selected power forward Nikoloz Tskitishvili from the Republic of Georgia. During the off-season, the team acquired Marcus Camby, and Brazilian rookie power forward, and first-round draft pick Nenê Hilario from the New York Knicks on draft day, acquired second-year guard Rodney White from the Detroit Pistons, signed free agents Mark Blount, and undrafted rookie point guard Junior Harrington, and acquired Chris Whitney from the Washington Wizards. The team also hired Jeff Bzdelik as their new head coach.

=== Regular season ===
Under Bzdelik and with the addition of Nenê, Camby and White, the Nuggets struggled losing nine of their first eleven games of the regular season. The team won three straight games afterwards, but then lost 15 of their next 16 games, which included a 10-game losing streak in December. Also in December, the team traded James Posey to the Houston Rockets in a three-team trade. The Nuggets posted a seven-game losing streak between January and February, and held a 12–37 record at the All-Star break. At mid-season, the team traded Blount back to his former team, the Boston Celtics, in exchange for Shammond Williams in February, while Whitney was released to free agency, and signed with the Orlando Magic for the remainder of the season. The Nuggets suffered a 14-game losing streak between February and March, and lost their final eight games of the season, finishing in last place in the Midwest Division with a league-worst 17–65 record, which was tied with the Cleveland Cavaliers, who finished with the same record this season. It was also the franchise's worst record since the 1997–98 season, as the team missed the NBA playoffs for the eighth consecutive year.

Juwan Howard averaged 18.4 points and 7.6 rebounds per game, while Nenê averaged 10.5 points and 6.1 rebounds per game, and was named to the NBA All-Rookie First Team, and Williams provided the team with 9.4 points and 5.1 assists per game in 27 games after the trade. In addition, White contributed 9.0 points per game, while Donnell Harvey provided with 7.9 points and 5.3 rebounds per game, and Camby averaged 7.6 points, 7.2 rebounds and 1.4 blocks per game, but only played just 29 games due to injury. Meanwhile, rookie small forward, and second-round draft pick Vincent Yarbrough contributed 6.9 points per game, second-year center Chris Andersen averaged 5.2 points and 4.6 rebounds per game, Harrington contributed 5.1 points and 3.4 assists per game, Tskitishvili contributed 3.9 points per game, but struggled only shooting .293 in field-goal percentage, and Ryan Bowen provided with 3.9 points per game.

During the NBA All-Star weekend at the Philips Arena in Atlanta, Georgia, Nenê was selected for the NBA Rookie Challenge Game, as a member of the Rookies team. He also finished in sixth place in Rookie of the Year voting. The Nuggets finished 25th in the NBA in home-game attendance, with an attendance of 607,813 at the Pepsi Center during the regular season, which was the fifth-lowest in the league.

=== Aftermath ===
Following the season, Howard signed as a free agent with the Orlando Magic, and Williams, Harvey and Harrington were all released to free agency.

== Draft picks ==
Round	Pick	Player	Position	Nationality	School/Club team
1	5	Nikoloz Tskitishvili	F/C	Georgia	
1	25	Frank Williams	PG	United States	Illinois
2	33	Vincent Yarbrough	SF	United States	Tennessee

== Roster ==
2002–03 Denver Nuggets roster
Players

Pos.	No.	Player	Height	Weight	DOB	From
F/C	15	Chris Andersen	6 ft 10 in (2.08 m)	230 lb (104 kg)		Blinn
G/F	32	Ryan Bowen (injured)	6 ft 7 in (2.01 m)	215 lb (98 kg)		Iowa
F/C	23	Marcus Camby	6 ft 11 in (2.11 m)	220 lb (100 kg)		UMass
G	21	Adam Harrington	6 ft 5 in (1.96 m)	200 lb (91 kg)		Auburn
G	6	Junior Harrington	6 ft 4 in (1.93 m)	180 lb (82 kg)		Wingate
F	1	Donnell Harvey	6 ft 8 in (2.03 m)	220 lb (100 kg)		Florida
F/C	5	Juwan Howard	6 ft 9 in (2.06 m)	240 lb (109 kg)		Michigan
F/C	31	Nenê	6 ft 11 in (2.11 m)	260 lb (118 kg)		Brazil
G	4	Predrag Savović (injured)	6 ft 6 in (1.98 m)	225 lb (102 kg)		Hawaiʻi
G	20	Jeff Trepagnier	6 ft 4 in (1.93 m)	200 lb (91 kg)		USC
F	22	Nikoloz Tskitishvili	7 ft 0 in (2.13 m)	225 lb (102 kg)		Republic of Georgia
G/F	7	Rodney White	6 ft 9 in (2.06 m)	238 lb (108 kg)		Charlotte
G	11	Shammond Williams	6 ft 1 in (1.85 m)	201 lb (91 kg)		North Carolina
G	3	Vincent Yarbrough	6 ft 7 in (2.01 m)	210 lb (95 kg)		Tennessee

Coaches
Head coach
- Jeff Bzdelik (UIC)
Assistant(s)
- Jarinn Akana (Hawaiʻi)
- Bill Branch (Lenoir–Rhyne) (assistant coach/scout)
- T. R. Dunn (Alabama)
- John MacLeod (Bellarmine)
- Mark Randall (Kansas) (player development)

Legend
- (DP) Unsigned draft pick
- (FA) Free agent
- (S) Suspended
- Injured

Roster

=== Roster notes ===
- Point guard Shammond Williams holds American and Georgian dual citizenship. He played for the Georgian national team although he was born in the United States.

== Regular season ==
=== Season standings ===
Midwest Division	W	L	PCT	GB	Home	Road	Div
y-San Antonio Spurs	60	22	.732	–	33–8	27–14	17–7
x-Dallas Mavericks	60	22	.732	–	33–8	27–14	18–6
x-Minnesota Timberwolves	51	31	.622	9	33–8	18–23	15–9
x-Utah Jazz	47	35	.573	13	29–12	18–23	15–9
e-Houston Rockets	43	39	.524	17	28–13	15–26	11–13
e-Memphis Grizzlies	28	54	.341	32	20–21	8–33	5–17
e-Denver Nuggets	17	65	.207	43	13–28	4–37	3–21

#	Western Conference				
#	Team	W	L	PCT	GB
1	z-San Antonio Spurs	60	22	.732	–
2	y-Sacramento Kings	59	23	.720	1
3	x-Dallas Mavericks	60	22	.732	–
4	x-Minnesota Timberwolves	51	31	.622	9
5	x-Los Angeles Lakers	50	32	.610	10
6	x-Portland Trail Blazers	50	32	.610	10
7	x-Utah Jazz	47	35	.573	13
8	x-Phoenix Suns	44	38	.537	16
9	e-Houston Rockets	43	39	.524	17
10	e-Seattle SuperSonics	40	42	.488	20
11	e-Golden State Warriors	38	44	.463	22
12	e-Memphis Grizzlies	28	54	.341	32
13	e-Los Angeles Clippers	27	55	.329	33
14	e-Denver Nuggets	17	65	.207	43

z - clinched division title
y - clinched division title
x - clinched playoff spot

== Player statistics ==
Legend
GP	Games played	GS	Games started	MPG	Minutes per game
FG%	Field-goal percentage	3P%	3-point field-goal percentage	FT%	Free-throw percentage
RPG	Rebounds per game	APG	Assists per game	SPG	Steals per game
BPG	Blocks per game	PPG	Points per game

=== Regular season ===
Player	GP	GS	MPG	FG%	3FG%	FT%	RPG	APG	SPG	BPG	PPG
Juwan Howard	77	77	35.5	.450	.500	.803	7.6	3.0	1.0	0.4	18.4
James Posey	25	24	34.9	.373	.273	.843	5.8	3.1	1.2	0.2	14.1
Nenê	80	53	28.2	.519	.000	.578	6.1	1.9	1.6	0.8	10.5
Chris Whitney	29	20	26.3	.360	.336	.807	1.6	4.3	0.6	0.0	9.6
Shammond Williams	27	9	26.4	.390	.363	.667	2.3	5.1	0.6	0.1	9.4
Rodney White	72	19	21.7	.408	.239	.784	3.0	1.7	0.6	0.4	9.0
Donnell Harvey	77	27	20.9	.446	.143	.670	5.3	1.3	0.6	0.4	7.9
Marcus Camby	29	9	21.2	.410	.400	.660	7.2	1.6	0.7	1.4	7.6
Vincent Yarbrough	59	39	23.4	.393	.269	.790	2.7	2.2	1.0	0.6	6.9
Devin Brown	3	2	23.7	.280	.000	.667	3.7	1.7	1.3	0.3	6.0
Kenny Satterfield	22	6	19.1	.309	.179	.696	1.6	2.4	0.8	0.1	5.6
Jeff Trepagnier	8	0	12.1	.425	.500	1.000	2.0	0.8	1.0	0.0	5.6
Mark Blount	54	24	16.4	.393		.717	3.4	0.6	0.4	0.9	5.2
Chris Andersen	59	3	15.4	.400	.000	.550	4.6	0.5	0.5	1.0	5.2
Junior Harrington	82	51	24.4	.362	.250	.652	3.0	3.4	1.0	0.2	5.1
Nikoloz Tskitishvili	81	16	16.3	.293	.243	.738	2.2	1.1	0.4	0.4	3.9
Ryan Bowen	62	31	16.1	.492	.286	.659	2.5	0.9	1.0	0.5	3.6
John Crotty	12	0	15.0	.341	.308	.600	1.3	2.4	0.3	0.0	3.4
Adam Harrington	6	0	12.3	.350	.364	.500	1.0	1.7	0.2	0.0	3.2
Predrag Savović	27	0	9.5	.312	.154	.724	0.9	0.8	0.5	0.0	3.1
Mark Bryant	3	0	4.7	.000		.500	0.7	0.7	0.0	0.0	0.3

Player statistics citation:

== Awards and records ==
- Nenê, NBA All-Rookie Team 1st Team

== See also ==
- 2002-03 NBA season
