= 2002–03 Phoenix Suns season =

NBA team season

- Head coach: Frank Johnson
- General manager: Bryan Colangelo
- Owner: Jerry Colangelo
- Arena: America West Arena

Results
- Record: 44–38 (.537)
- Place: Division: 4th (Pacific); Conference: 8th (Western)
- Playoff finish: First round (lost to Spurs 2–4)
- Stats at Basketball Reference

Local media
- Television: KUTP; Fox Sports Net Arizona; Cox 9
- Radio: KTAR

The 2002–03 Phoenix Suns season was the 35th season for the Phoenix Suns in the National Basketball Association.

== Season summary ==
=== Off-season ===
After missing the NBA playoffs the previous season, the Suns received the ninth overall pick in the 2002 NBA draft, and selected power forward, and high school basketball star Amar'e Stoudemire. During the off-season, the team signed free agent Scott Williams, who won three NBA championships with the Chicago Bulls in the early 1990s.

=== Regular season ===
In their first full season under head coach Frank Johnson, and with the addition of Stoudemire, the Suns played around .500 in winning percentage with a 10–10 start to the regular season. However, the team won 11 of their next 13 games, and later on held a 29–21 record at the All-Star break. The Suns played slightly below .500 for the remainder of the season, finishing in fourth place in the Pacific Division with a 44–38 record, which was an eight-game improvement over the previous season, and earning the eighth seed in the Western Conference. After a one-year absence, the Suns returned to the NBA playoffs after snapping a streak of thirteen consecutive seasons the year before, which was a franchise record; the team also posted a successful 30–11 home record at the America West Arena, but struggled posting a 14–27 road record during the regular season.

Stephon Marbury averaged 22.3 points, 8.1 assists and 1.3 steals per game, and was named to the All-NBA Third Team, while Shawn Marion averaged 21.2 points, 9.5 rebounds and 2.3 steals per game, and led the Suns with 141 three-point field goals, and Stoudemire provided the team with 13.5 points and 8.8 rebounds per game, and was named the NBA Rookie of the Year, and was also named to the NBA All-Rookie First Team. In addition, Anfernee Hardaway provided with 10.6 points and 4.1 assists per game, but only played 58 games due to injury, while second-year guard Joe Johnson contributed 9.8 points per game, and rookie shooting guard, and first-round draft pick Casey Jacobsen contributed 5.1 points per game. Meanwhile, Jake Tsakalidis averaged 4.9 points and 3.7 rebounds per game, but only played just 33 games, Tom Gugliotta provided with 4.8 points and 3.7 rebounds per game, but only appeared in just 27 games, Bo Outlaw averaged 4.7 points and 4.6 rebounds per game, and Williams contributed 4.0 points and 2.8 rebounds per game.

During the NBA All-Star weekend at the Philips Arena in Atlanta, Georgia, Marbury and Marion were both selected for the 2003 NBA All-Star Game, as members of the Western Conference All-Star team; it was Marion's first ever All-Star appearance, and the second and final All-Star appearance for Marbury. Meanwhile, Stoudemire was selected for the NBA Rookie Challenge Game, as a member of the Rookies team, and also participated in the NBA Slam Dunk Contest. Marbury finished tied in 14th place in Most Improved Player voting, while Hardaway finished tied in 26th place; Marion finished tied in 13th place in Defensive Player of the Year voting, while Joe Johnson finished tied in eleventh place in Sixth Man of the Year voting, and Frank Johnson finished in eleventh place in Coach of the Year voting.

The Suns finished 16th in the NBA in home-game attendance, with an attendance of 666,559 at the America West Arena during the regular season.

=== NBA playoffs ===
In the Western Conference First Round of the 2003 NBA playoffs, the Suns faced off against the top–seeded, and Midwest Division champion San Antonio Spurs, who were led by the trio of All-Star forward, and Most Valuable Player of the Year, Tim Duncan, second-year star Tony Parker, and David Robinson. The Suns won Game 1 over the Spurs on the road in overtime, 96–95 at the SBC Center, but then lost the next two games to the Spurs, before winning Game 4 at home, 86–84 at the America West Arena to even the series. However, the Suns lost the next two games, which included a Game 6 loss to the Spurs at the America West Arena, 87–85, thus losing the series in six games.

The Spurs would go on to defeat the New Jersey Nets in six games in the 2003 NBA Finals, winning their second NBA championship in franchise history.

=== Aftermath ===
Following the season, Tsakalidis and Outlaw were both traded to the Memphis Grizzlies, while Williams was released to free agency, and would later on sign as a free agent with the Dallas Mavericks midway through the following season, and Randy Brown retired.

== Offseason ==
=== NBA draft ===
| Round | Pick | Player | Position | Nationality | College / Club Team |
|---|---|---|---|---|---|
| 1 | 9 | Amar'e Stoudemire | Forward | United States | |
| 1 | 22 | Casey Jacobsen | Guard | United States | Stanford |

== Roster ==
2002–03 Phoenix Suns roster
Players

| Pos. | No. | Player | Height | Weight | DOB | From |
|---|---|---|---|---|---|---|
| G | 0 | Randy Brown | 6 ft 2 in (1.88 m) | 190 lb (86 kg) | 1968–05–22 | New Mexico State |
| F | 4 | Alton Ford | 6 ft 9 in (2.06 m) | 275 lb (125 kg) | 1981–05–29 | Houston |
| F | 24 | Tom Gugliotta | 6 ft 10 in (2.08 m) | 240 lb (109 kg) | 1969–12–19 | NC State |
| G | 1 | Penny Hardaway | 6 ft 7 in (2.01 m) | 195 lb (88 kg) | 1971–07–18 | Memphis |
| F | 23 | Casey Jacobsen | 6 ft 6 in (1.98 m) | 215 lb (98 kg) | 1981–03–19 | Stanford |
| G | 2 | Joe Johnson | 6 ft 7 in (2.01 m) | 225 lb (102 kg) | 1981–06–29 | Arkansas |
| F | 14 | Dan Langhi | 6 ft 11 in (2.11 m) | 220 lb (100 kg) | 1977–11–28 | Vanderbilt |
| G | 3 | Stephon Marbury | 6 ft 2 in (1.88 m) | 180 lb (82 kg) | 1977–02–20 | Georgia Tech |
| F | 31 | Shawn Marion | 6 ft 7 in (2.01 m) | 220 lb (100 kg) | 1978–05–07 | UNLV |
| C | 45 | Bo Outlaw | 6 ft 8 in (2.03 m) | 210 lb (95 kg) | 1971–04–13 | Houston |
| F | 32 | Amar'e Stoudemire | 6 ft 10 in (2.08 m) | 245 lb (111 kg) | 1982–11–16 | Cypress Creek HS (FL) |
| C | 25 | Jake Tsakalidis | 7 ft 2 in (2.18 m) | 285 lb (129 kg) | 1979–06–10 | Georgia |
| C | 43 | Jake Voskuhl | 6 ft 11 in (2.11 m) | 245 lb (111 kg) | 1977–11–01 | Connecticut |
| C | 47 | Scott Williams | 6 ft 10 in (2.08 m) | 230 lb (104 kg) | 1968–03–21 | North Carolina |

Coaches
Head coach
- Frank Johnson
Assistant(s)
- Mike D'Antoni
- Tim Grgurich
- Marc Iavaroni
- Phil Weber

Legend
- (DP) Unsigned draft pick
- (FA) Free agent
- (S) Suspended
- Injured

Roster
Updated: October 23, 2002

== Regular season ==
=== Standings ===
| Pacific Division | W | L | PCT | GB | Home | Road | Div |
|---|---|---|---|---|---|---|---|
| y-Sacramento Kings | 59 | 23 | .720 | – | 35–6 | 24–17 | 17–7 |
| x-Los Angeles Lakers | 50 | 32 | .610 | 9 | 31–10 | 19–22 | 15–9 |
| x-Portland Trail Blazers | 50 | 32 | .610 | 9 | 27–14 | 23–18 | 15–9 |
| x-Phoenix Suns | 44 | 38 | .537 | 15 | 30–11 | 14–27 | 12–12 |
| e-Seattle SuperSonics | 40 | 42 | .488 | 19 | 25–16 | 15–26 | 11–13 |
| e-Golden State Warriors | 38 | 44 | .463 | 21 | 24–17 | 14–27 | 8–16 |
| e-Los Angeles Clippers | 27 | 55 | .329 | 32 | 16–25 | 11–30 | 6–18 |

| # | Western Conference | | | | |
| # | Team | W | L | PCT | GB |
|---|---|---|---|---|---|
| 1 | z-San Antonio Spurs | 60 | 22 | .732 | – |
| 2 | y-Sacramento Kings | 59 | 23 | .720 | 1 |
| 3 | x-Dallas Mavericks | 60 | 22 | .732 | – |
| 4 | x-Minnesota Timberwolves | 51 | 31 | .622 | 9 |
| 5 | x-Los Angeles Lakers | 50 | 32 | .610 | 10 |
| 6 | x-Portland Trail Blazers | 50 | 32 | .610 | 10 |
| 7 | x-Utah Jazz | 47 | 35 | .573 | 13 |
| 8 | x-Phoenix Suns | 44 | 38 | .537 | 16 |
| 9 | e-Houston Rockets | 43 | 39 | .524 | 17 |
| 10 | e-Seattle SuperSonics | 40 | 42 | .488 | 20 |
| 11 | e-Golden State Warriors | 38 | 44 | .463 | 22 |
| 12 | e-Memphis Grizzlies | 28 | 54 | .341 | 32 |
| 13 | e-Los Angeles Clippers | 27 | 55 | .329 | 33 |
| 14 | e-Denver Nuggets | 17 | 65 | .207 | 43 |

== Playoffs ==
=== Game log ===
2003 playoff game log
First Round: 2–4 (home: 1–2; road: 1–2)

| Game | Date | Team | Score | High points | High rebounds | High assists | Location Attendance | Series |
|---|---|---|---|---|---|---|---|---|
| 1 | April 19 | @ San Antonio | W 96–95 (OT) | Stephon Marbury (26) | Shawn Marion (12) | Stephon Marbury (6) | SBC Center; 19,217 | 1–0 |
| 2 | April 21 | @ San Antonio | L 76–84 | Stephon Marbury (32) | Shawn Marion (12) | Stephon Marbury (5) | SBC Center; 19,217 | 1–1 |
| 3 | April 25 | San Antonio | L 86–99 | Stephon Marbury (25) | Joe Johnson (9) | Stephon Marbury (7) | America West Arena; 19,023 | 1–2 |
| 4 | April 27 | San Antonio | W 86–84 | Stephon Marbury (18) | Shawn Marion (14) | Hardaway, Marbury (7) | America West Arena; 18,756 | 2–2 |
| 5 | April 29 | @ San Antonio | L 82–94 | Shawn Marion (22) | Amar'e Stoudemire (14) | Stephon Marbury (7) | SBC Center; 19,217 | 2–3 |
| 6 | May 1 | San Antonio | L 85–87 | Shawn Marion (24) | Shawn Marion (15) | Penny Hardaway (5) | America West Arena; 18,913 | 2–4 |

2003 schedule

== Awards and honors ==
=== Week/Month ===
- Amar'e Stoudemire was named Western Conference Rookie of the Month for January.
- Amar'e Stoudemire was named Western Conference Rookie of the Month for April.
- Frank Johnson was named Western Conference Coach of the Month for December.
- Stephon Marbury was named Western Conference Player of the Week for games played November 24 through November 30.
- Stephon Marbury was named Western Conference Player of the Week for games played January 5 through January 11.
- Shawn Marion was named Western Conference Player of the Week for games played April 7 through April 13.

=== All-Star ===
- Shawn Marion was selected as a reserve for the Western Conference in the All-Star Game. It was his first All-Star selection.
- Stephon Marbury was selected as a reserve for the Western Conference in the All-Star Game. It was his second All-Star selection.
- Amar'e Stoudemire was selected to play for the Rookie team in the Rookie Challenge.
- Stephon Marbury was selected to compete in the Skills Challenge. Marbury lost the competition to the player he was traded to Phoenix for, Jason Kidd.
- Amar'e Stoudemire was selected to compete in the Slam Dunk Contest. Stoudemire finished third, behind Desmond Mason and champion Jason Richardson.

=== Season ===
- Amar'e Stoudemire received the Rookie of the Year Award.
- Stephon Marbury was named to the All-NBA Third Team.
- Amar'e Stoudemire was named to the NBA All-Rookie First Team.
- Shawn Marion finished 13th in Defensive Player of the Year voting.
- Joe Johnson finished 11th in Sixth Man of the Year voting.
- Stephon Marbury finished 14th in Most Improved Player voting.
- Penny Hardaway finished 26th in Most Improved Player voting.

== Player statistics ==
Legend
| GP | Games played | GS | Games started | MPG | Minutes per game |
| FG% | Field-goal percentage | 3P% | 3-point field-goal percentage | FT% | Free-throw percentage |
| RPG | Rebounds per game | APG | Assists per game | SPG | Steals per game |
| BPG | Blocks per game | PPG | Points per game |

=== Season ===
| Player | GP | GS | MPG | FG% | 3P% | FT% | RPG | APG | SPG | BPG | PPG |
|---|---|---|---|---|---|---|---|---|---|---|---|
| Randy Brown | 32 | 0 | 8.2 | .372 | . | .750 | 0.8 | 1.1 | .5 | .1 | 1.3 |
| Alton Ford | 11 | 0 | 2.8 | .333 | . | .333 | 0.5 | 0.1 | .0 | .0 | 0.6 |
| Tom Gugliotta | 27 | 11 | 16.6 | .455 | .000 | 1.000^ | 3.7 | 1.1 | .5 | .2 | 4.8 |
| Penny Hardaway | 58 | 51 | 30.6 | .447 | .356 | .794 | 4.4 | 4.1 | 1.1 | .4 | 10.6 |
| Casey Jacobsen | 72 | 0 | 15.9 | .373 | .315 | .686 | 1.2 | 1.0 | .5 | .1 | 5.1 |
| Joe Johnson | 82 | 34 | 27.5 | .397 | .366 | .774 | 3.2 | 2.6 | .8 | .2 | 9.8 |
| Dan Langhi | 60 | 0 | 9.0 | .401 | .290 | .600 | 1.5 | 0.4 | .3 | .1 | 3.1 |
| Stephon Marbury | 81 | 81 | 40.0 | .439 | .301 | .803 | 3.2 | 8.1 | 1.3 | .2 | 22.3 |
| Shawn Marion | 81 | 81 | 41.6 | .452 | .387 | .851^ | 9.5 | 2.4 | 2.3 | 1.2 | 21.2 |
| Bo Outlaw | 80 | 20 | 22.5 | .550† | .000 | .621 | 4.6 | 1.4 | .6 | .9 | 4.7 |
| Amar'e Stoudemire | 82 | 71 | 31.3 | .472† | .200 | .661 | 8.8 | 1.0 | .8 | 1.1 | 13.5 |
| Jake Tsakalidis | 33 | 27 | 16.5 | .452 | . | .672 | 3.7 | 0.4 | .2 | .5 | 4.9 |
| Jake Voskuhl | 65 | 1 | 14.6 | .564† | . | .667 | 3.5 | 0.6 | .3 | .4 | 3.8 |
| Scott Williams | 69 | 33 | 12.6 | .411 | .000 | .786 | 2.8 | 0.3 | .4 | .3 | 4.0 |

† – Minimum 300 field goals made.
^ – Minimum 125 free throws made.

=== Playoffs ===
| Player | GP | GS | MPG | FG% | 3P% | FT% | RPG | APG | SPG | BPG | PPG |
|---|---|---|---|---|---|---|---|---|---|---|---|
| Tom Gugliotta | 2 | 0 | 5.0 | .500 | . | .500 | 1.0 | 0.0 | .0 | .0 | 2.5 |
| Penny Hardaway | 6 | 6 | 40.7 | .386 | .360^ | .722 | 6.0 | 4.3 | 2.2 | .8 | 12.7 |
| Casey Jacobsen | 6 | 0 | 6.5 | .200 | .400^ | .000 | 0.5 | 0.3 | .5 | .0 | 1.0 |
| Joe Johnson | 6 | 0 | 27.3 | .275 | .154 | .400 | 4.3 | 1.3 | .7 | .3 | 5.3 |
| Stephon Marbury | 6 | 6 | 45.2 | .375 | .227 | .758 | 4.0 | 5.7 | 1.2 | .0 | 22.0 |
| Shawn Marion | 6 | 6 | 47.2 | .374 | .321 | .846 | 11.7 | 2.0 | 1.8 | 1.8 | 18.5 |
| Bo Outlaw | 6 | 0 | 11.7 | .100 | . | .500 | 2.2 | 0.8 | .2 | .2 | 0.7 |
| Amar'e Stoudemire | 6 | 6 | 33.8 | .523† | 1.000^ | .571 | 7.8 | 1.2 | 1.7 | 1.5 | 14.2 |
| Jake Voskuhl | 6 | 0 | 16.3 | .706† | . | .923# | 3.7 | 0.3 | .7 | .7 | 6.0 |
| Scott Williams | 6 | 6 | 13.8 | .344 | . | 1.000# | 2.5 | 0.2 | .7 | .5 | 4.0 |

† – Minimum 20 field goals made.
^ – Minimum 5 three-pointers made.
# – Minimum 10 free throws made.

Player statistics citation:
