= 2002–03 Los Angeles Clippers season =

NBA professional basketball team season

- Head coach: Alvin Gentry Dennis Johnson
- Owners: Donald Sterling
- Arena: Staples Center

Results
- Record: 27–55 (.329)
- Place: Division: 7th (Pacific); Conference: 13th (Western)
- Playoff finish: Did not qualify
- Stats at Basketball Reference

Local media
- Television: KTLA; Fox Sports Net West 2
- Radio: KXTA

The 2002–03 Los Angeles Clippers season was the 33rd season for the Los Angeles Clippers in the National Basketball Association, and their 19th season in Los Angeles, California.

== Season summary ==
=== Off-season ===
The Clippers received the eighth overall pick in the 2002 NBA draft from the Atlanta Hawks via trade, and selected power forward Chris Wilcox from the University of Maryland; the team also selected center Melvin Ely out of Fresno State University with the twelfth overall pick. During the off-season, the Clippers acquired Andre Miller from the Cleveland Cavaliers, and signed free agents, former Clippers forward Cherokee Parks and Wang Zhizhi. Rookie shooting guard Marko Jaric, who was drafted by the Clippers as the 30th overall pick in the 2000 NBA draft, made his debut in the NBA this season.

For the season, the Clippers revealed new blue alternate road uniforms, which featured a V-shaped collar, and the city name "Los Angeles" in red letters with a white outline on the front of their jerseys. The uniforms also featured a white trim, white side panels on their jerseys and shorts, and the team's primary logo on the leg left on their shorts. The team's new alternate uniforms would remain in use until 2010.

=== Regular season ===
With the addition of Miller and Jaric, the Clippers got off to a 12–16 start to the regular season, but then posted a six-game losing streak between December and January afterwards, and later on held a 17–32 record at the All-Star break. Head coach Alvin Gentry was fired after a 19–39 start to the season, and was replaced with assistant coach, and retired All-Star guard Dennis Johnson as an interim coach. The Clippers posted an eight-game losing streak between February and March, but won their final three games of the season, finishing in last place in the Pacific Division with a 27–55 record, and missing the NBA playoffs for the sixth consecutive year.

Elton Brand averaged 18.5 points, 11.3 rebounds and 2.5 blocks per game, while Corey Maggette averaged 16.8 points and 5.0 rebounds per game, and Lamar Odom provided the team with 14.6 points, 6.7 rebounds and 3.6 assists per game, but only played just 49 games due to injury. In addition, Miller contributed 13.6 points and 6.7 assists per game, while Michael Olowokandi provided with 12.3 points, 9.1 rebounds and 2.2 blocks per game, but only appeared in just 36 games also due to injury, and Eric Piatkowski contributed 9.7 points per game. Meanwhile, Quentin Richardson averaged 9.4 points and 4.8 rebounds per game, Jaric provided with 7.4 points and 2.9 assists per game, Keyon Dooling contributed 6.4 points per game, Parks averaged 6.3 points and 4.4 rebounds per game, but only appeared in just 30 games, Ely provided with 4.5 points and 3.3 rebounds per game, and Sean Rooks contributed 4.2 points and 3.1 rebounds per game.

During the NBA All-Star weekend at the Philips Arena in Atlanta, Georgia, Jaric was selected for the NBA Rookie Challenge Game, as a member of the Rookies team. Maggette finished in tenth place in Most Improved Player voting. The Clippers finished 14th in the NBA in home-game attendance, with an attendance of 706,471 at the Staples Center during the regular season.

=== Aftermath ===
Following the season, Odom signed as a free agent with the Miami Heat after four seasons with the Clippers, while Miller signed with the Denver Nuggets after only one season with the team. Meanwhile, Olowokandi signed with the Minnesota Timberwolves, Piatkowski signed with the Houston Rockets, and Johnson was fired as head coach.

== Draft picks ==
Round	Pick	Player	Position	Nationality	College / Club Team
1	8	Chris Wilcox	F	United States	Maryland
1	12	Melvin Ely	C	United States	Fresno State
2	41	Mario Kasun	C	Croatia	Opel Skyliners (Germany)

== Roster ==
Los Angeles Clippers roster
Players

Pos.	No.	Player	Height	Weight	DOB	From
F	42	Elton Brand	6 ft 8 in (2.03 m)	272 lb (123 kg)		Duke
G	1	Keyon Dooling	6 ft 3 in (1.91 m)	190 lb (86 kg)		Missouri
C	2	Melvin Ely	6 ft 10 in (2.08 m)	261 lb (118 kg)		Fresno State
F	32	Tremaine Fowlkes	6 ft 8 in (2.03 m)	220 lb (100 kg)		Fresno State
G	20	Marko Jaric	6 ft 7 in (2.01 m)	217 lb (98 kg)		Serbia & Montenegro
F	50	Corey Maggette	6 ft 6 in (1.98 m)	225 lb (102 kg)		Duke
G	24	Andre Miller	6 ft 2 in (1.88 m)	200 lb (91 kg)		Utah
F	7	Lamar Odom	6 ft 10 in (2.08 m)	221 lb (100 kg)		Rhode Island
C	34	Michael Olowokandi	7 ft 0 in (2.13 m)	270 lb (122 kg)		Pacific
F/C	44	Cherokee Parks	6 ft 11 in (2.11 m)	240 lb (109 kg)		Duke
G/F	52	Eric Piatkowski	6 ft 7 in (2.01 m)	215 lb (98 kg)		Nebraska
G	3	Quentin Richardson	6 ft 5 in (1.96 m)	238 lb (108 kg)		DePaul
C	45	Sean Rooks	6 ft 10 in (2.08 m)	260 lb (118 kg)		Arizona
F/C	16	Zhizhi Wang	7 ft 1 in (2.16 m)	284 lb (129 kg)		China
F	54	Chris Wilcox	6 ft 10 in (2.08 m)	235 lb (107 kg)		Maryland

Coaches
Head coach
- Dennis Johnson
Assistant(s)
- Rex Kalamian
- Morris McHone
- Jerry DeGregorio

Legend
- (DP) Unsigned draft pick
- (FA) Free agent
- (S) Suspended
- Injured

Roster
Updated: 2009-10-04

=== Roster notes ===
- This is Cherokee Parks' second tour of duty with the franchise. He previously played for the team in 2000–2001.

== Regular season ==
=== Season standings ===
Pacific Division	W	L	PCT	GB	Home	Road	Div
y-Sacramento Kings	59	23	.720	–	35–6	24–17	17–7
x-Los Angeles Lakers	50	32	.610	9	31–10	19–22	15–9
x-Portland Trail Blazers	50	32	.610	9	27–14	23–18	15–9
x-Phoenix Suns	44	38	.537	15	30–11	14–27	12–12
e-Seattle SuperSonics	40	42	.488	19	25–16	15–26	11–13
e-Golden State Warriors	38	44	.463	21	24–17	14–27	8–16
e-Los Angeles Clippers	27	55	.329	32	16–25	11–30	6–18

#	Western Conference				
#	Team	W	L	PCT	GB
1	z-San Antonio Spurs	60	22	.732	–
2	y-Sacramento Kings	59	23	.720	1
3	x-Dallas Mavericks	60	22	.732	–
4	x-Minnesota Timberwolves	51	31	.622	9
5	x-Los Angeles Lakers	50	32	.610	10
6	x-Portland Trail Blazers	50	32	.610	10
7	x-Utah Jazz	47	35	.573	13
8	x-Phoenix Suns	44	38	.537	16
9	e-Houston Rockets	43	39	.524	17
10	e-Seattle SuperSonics	40	42	.488	20
11	e-Golden State Warriors	38	44	.463	22
12	e-Memphis Grizzlies	28	54	.341	32
13	e-Los Angeles Clippers	27	55	.329	33
14	e-Denver Nuggets	17	65	.207	43

== Player statistics ==
Legend
GP	Games played	GS	Games started	MPG	Minutes per game
FG%	Field-goal percentage	3P%	3-point field-goal percentage	FT%	Free-throw percentage
RPG	Rebounds per game	APG	Assists per game	SPG	Steals per game
BPG	Blocks per game	PPG	Points per game

Player	GP	GS	MPG	FG%	3P%	FT%	RPG	APG	SPG	BPG	PPG
Elton Brand	62	61	39.6	50.2	0.0	68.5	11.3	2.5	1.1	2.5	18.5
Corey Maggette	64	57	31.3	44.4	35.0	80.2	5.0	1.9	0.9	0.3	16.8
Lamar Odom	49	47	34.3	43.9	32.6	77.7	6.7	3.6	0.9	0.8	14.6
Andre Miller	80	80	36.4	40.6	21.3	79.5	4.0	6.7	1.2	0.1	13.6
Michael Olowokandi	36	36	38.0	42.7	0.0	65.7	9.1	1.3	0.5	2.2	12.3
Eric Piatkowski	62	26	21.9	47.1	39.8	82.8	2.5	1.1	0.5	0.1	9.7
Quentin Richardson	59	13	23.2	37.2	30.8	68.5	4.8	0.9	0.6	0.2	9.4
Marko Jaric	66	12	20.9	40.1	31.9	75.2	2.4	2.9	1.5	0.2	7.4
Keyon Dooling	55	1	17.6	38.9	36.0	77.2	1.3	1.6	0.4	0.1	6.4
Cherokee Parks	30	18	21.6	50.3	50.0	60.5	4.4	0.7	0.5	0.7	6.3
Melvin Ely	52	7	15.4	49.5	0.0	70.3	3.3	0.3	0.2	0.6	4.5
Tremaine Fowlkes	37	10	15.5	43.8	22.2	84.7	2.8	0.6	0.7	0.1	4.4
Wang Zhizhi	41	1	10.0	38.3	34.0	72.4	1.9	0.2	0.2	0.2	4.4
Sean Rooks	70	38	19.2	42.1	0.0	81.0	3.1	1.0	0.5	0.6	4.2
Chris Wilcox	46	3	10.4	52.1	0.0	50.0	2.3	0.5	0.2	0.3	3.7

Player statistics citation:

== Transactions ==
The Clippers have been involved in the following transactions during the 2002–03 season.

=== Trades ===
June 26, 2002
July 30, 2002
To Los Angeles Clippers

- A future consideration
To Los Angeles Clippers

- Andre Miller & Bryant Stith
To Orlando Magic

- Draft rights to Mario Kasun
To Cleveland Cavaliers

- Harold Jamison & Darius Miles

=== Free agents ===
==== Additions ====
Player	Signed	Former team
Cherokee Parks	September 27	San Antonio Spurs
Wang Zhizhi	October 1	Dallas Mavericks

==== Subtractions ====
Player	Left	New team
Earl Boykins	waived, June 28	Golden State Warriors
Obinna Ekezie	waived, July 19	Orlando Magic
Jeff McInnis	free agency, August 12	Portland Trail Blazers
Doug Overton	free agency, September 18	Chicago Bulls
Bryant Stith	waived, October 28	Brunswick Bulldogs (head coach)

Player Transactions Citation:

== See also ==
- 2002-03 NBA season
