= Tito Maddox =

American basketball player (born 1981)

Personal information
- Born: June 7, 1981 (age 45) Compton, California, U.S.
- Listed height: 6 ft 4 in (1.93 m)
- Listed weight: 190 lb (86 kg)

Career information
- High school: Compton (Compton, California)
- College: Fresno State (2000–2001)
- NBA draft: 2002: 2nd round, 38th overall pick
- Drafted by: Houston Rockets
- Playing career: 2002–2003
- Position: Shooting guard
- Number: 6

Career history
- 2002–2003: Houston Rockets

Career highlights
- First-team All-WAC (2001); Western Athletic Conference Rookie of the Year (2001)
- Stats at NBA.com
- Stats at Basketball Reference

Theodore D. "Tito" Maddox (born June 7, 1981) is an American former professional basketball player who briefly played in the National Basketball Association (NBA).

Maddox was the center of a major illegal benefits scandal while a student-athlete at Fresno State, creating NCAA rules violations.

He was drafted in the second round of the NBA draft but played only one season in the NBA.

== Early years ==
Born in Compton, California, Maddox was raised by his mother, Gloria, in a single-parent Compton home along with his three younger siblings. He was a star basketball player at Compton High School.

== College career ==
At 6'4", 190 lbs. Maddox made his mark his sole year at Fresno State, being named the 2001 Western Athletic Conference (WAC) Freshman of the Year after averaging 13.5 points, 5.8 rebounds, 8.0 assists and 1.6 steals. He started his collegiate career by guiding Fresno State to 11 consecutive wins.

As guard, Maddox knew how to share the ball, leading the WAC and ranking fourth nationally with 8.0 assists per game and ending the season with 130 assists in WAC play which stands as a school record and the second-highest total in conference history. That record was partly due to compiling double figures in assists five times and registering one stretch with three consecutive double-digit assist performances, including a school-record-tying and career-high 17 assists vs. Texas Christian on Jan. 10, 2001.

Maddox was named WAC Player of the Week on Dec. 26, 2000 after averaging 18.7 points, 10.3 assists and 2.3 steals in wins over Toledo, Louisiana-Lafayette and Georgia; And his performance vs. Toledo and Louisiana-Lafayette also earned him MVP honors in the 2000 Trend Homes Classic. He received WAC Player of the Week recognition once again after logging 16 points, eight rebounds, nine assists and a career-high five steals vs. Texas-El Paso on Jan. 25, 2000.

Maddox also earned selection to the All-WAC Second Team, the WAC All-Newcomer Team and the NABC District 13 First Team.

=== Scandal and departure ===
Maddox was the center of a major illegal benefits scandal while a student-athlete at Fresno State, creating NCAA rules violations. In the summer of 1998, before his final year of high school, Maddox had befriended an events promoter who ended up working on behalf of sports agents. By the time he was playing for Fresno State, Maddox was flown to meet with agents in Las Vegas, Nevada and they came to a covert agreement. He and his mother began receiving cash payments as well as cars: a late-model Nissan Altima for his mother and a 1997 Ford Explorer for him. Maddox estimated he received $1,500 every month for about a year and a half, totaling almost $30,000. In explaining his actions, he claimed that his unfamiliarity with NCAA rules let him to ask the agents what they could do to help his family; noting that "They let me know they could help me, they put it out there on the table: 'If you come with us, we can help your mom, brothers and sister with whatever they need.' That's all I cared about. I didn't know the rules then, and of course they didn't explain it."

Maddox was suspended for the first eight games of the 2000 season after he admitted that he and then-USC forward Jeff Trepagnier were supplied with airline tickets to meet with the agents Ron and Ken Delpit of Franchise Sports. Things took a turn for the worse when he boarded another illegally paid-for flight to visit his girlfriend in El Paso in 2001. Upon finding out, Fresno State ruled him ineligible for the 2001–02 season and Maddox opted to declare for the 2002 NBA draft. He chose different agents as he found no one knew of those that he had previously been dealing with.

In December 2002, Maddox revealed to the Fresno Bee that he had accepted illegal benefits, Fresno State ended up with a self-imposed two-year probation and a loss of three scholarships.

== Professional career ==
An early entry candidate for the 2002 NBA draft, Maddox was selected in the second round (38th overall) by the Houston Rockets. He averaged 1.2 points with 0.8 rebounds and 0.6 assists in nine games during his rookie season, playing at most 11 minutes on Feb. 22 vs. Memphis. He spent three stints on the injured list that year and at the end of the season he ended his career where it started. He was cut the next year by the Cleveland Cavaliers, giving him a total of only one season in the NBA.

Maddox' final game in the NBA was played on April 6, 2003, in a 114 - 93 win over the Orlando Magic where he recorded 1 assist, 1 block and 1 steal.

== Personal ==
As of 2008, Maddox was living with his wife and two children in Carson, California.

In July 2007, Maddox underwent surgery to remove a cancerous brain tumor. The surgery was successful.

== Career statistics ==
Legend
GP	Games played	GS	Games started	MPG	Minutes per game
FG%	Field goal percentage	3P%	3-point field goal percentage	FT%	Free throw percentage
RPG	Rebounds per game	APG	Assists per game	SPG	Steals per game
BPG	Blocks per game	PPG	Points per game	**Bold**	Career high

=== College ===
Year	Team	GP	GS	MPG	FG%	3P%	FT%	RPG	APG	SPG	BPG	PPG
2000–01	Fresno State	25	24	32.3	.391	.286	.703	5.8	8.0	1.6	.2	13.5

=== NBA ===
Year	Team	GP	GS	MPG	FG%	3P%	FT%	RPG	APG	SPG	BPG	PPG
2002–03	Houston	9	0	3.9	.250	.000	.625	.8	.6	.3	.1	1.2
