= 2002–03 Golden State Warriors season =

NBA professional basketball team season

- Head coach: Eric Musselman
- Owners: Chris Cohan
- Arena: The Arena in Oakland

Results
- Record: 38–44 (.463)
- Place: Division: 6th (Pacific); Conference: 11th (Western)
- Playoff finish: Did not qualify
- Stats at Basketball Reference

The 2002–03 Golden State Warriors season was the 57th season for the Golden State Warriors in the National Basketball Association, and their 41st season in the San Francisco Bay Area.

== Season summary ==
=== Off-season ===
The Warriors received the third overall pick in the 2002 NBA draft, and selected small forward Mike Dunleavy Jr. out of Duke University. During the off-season, the team hired Eric Musselman as their new head coach, and later on signed free agent Earl Boykins in November.

For the season, the Warriors redesigned their white home uniforms and dark navy blue road uniforms, which featured a dark navy blue, orange and golden yellow trim, and orange side panels with dark navy blue and golden yellow outlines; the left leg of their shorts featured their alternate logo of a golden yellow letter "W" with a lightning bolt in front of an orange basketball with dark navy blue seams. The home uniforms featured dark navy blue side panels on the bottom on the back of their shorts, while the road uniforms featured golden yellow side panels. The team's new uniforms would remain in use until 2010.

=== Regular season ===
Under Musselman, the Warriors got off to a slow start by losing six of their first seven games of the regular season, and held a 4–11 record at the end of November. However, the team later on posted an 8–7 record in January, then won 8 of their 13 games in February, and held a 21–27 record at the All-Star break. The Warriors posted a six-game winning streak between February and March, and reached .500 in winning percentage with a 30–30 record as of March 4, 2003. However, the team fell below .500 by losing 14 of their final 22 games of the season, finishing in sixth place in the Pacific Division with a 38–44 record, which was a 17-game improvement over the previous season; however, the team missed the NBA playoffs for the ninth consecutive year.

Antawn Jamison averaged 22.2 points and 7.0 rebounds per game, while second-year star Gilbert Arenas averaged 18.3 points, 4.7 rebounds, 6.3 assists and 1.5 steals per game, contributed 109 three-point field goals, and was named the NBA Most Improved Player of the Year, and second-year star Jason Richardson provided the team with 15.6 points per game, and also led them with 123 three-point field goals. In addition, second-year forward Troy Murphy provided with 11.7 points and 10.2 rebounds per game, while Boykins contributed 8.8 points and 3.3 assists per game, and Erick Dampier averaged 8.2 points, 6.6 rebounds and 1.9 blocks per game. Meanwhile, Bob Sura provided with 7.3 points and 3.2 assists, Dunleavy contributed 5.7 points per game, and Adonal Foyle averaged 5.4 points, 6.0 rebounds and 2.5 blocks per game.

During the NBA All-Star weekend at the Philips Arena in Atlanta, Georgia, Arenas, Richardson and Murphy were all selected for the NBA Rookie Challenge Game, as members of the Sophomores team. Arenas scored 30 points and made 6 out of 12 three-point field-goal attempts, and was named the Rookie Challenge Game's Most Valuable Player, as the Sophomores defeated the Rookies team, 132–112. In addition, Richardson participated in the NBA Slam Dunk Contest, in which he won for the second consecutive year. Murphy finished in third place in Most Improved Player voting, while Boykins finished in 25th place, and Jamison finished tied in 26th place; Boykins also finished in seventh place in Sixth Man of the Year voting, while Foyle finished tied in 13th place in Defensive Player of the Year voting, and Musselman finished in second place in Coach of the Year voting, behind Gregg Popovich of the San Antonio Spurs.

The Warriors finished 21st in the NBA in home-game attendance, with an attendance of 634,935 at The Arena in Oakland during the regular season.

=== Aftermath ===
Following the season, Arenas signed as a free agent with the Washington Wizards after two seasons with the Warriors, while Jamison and Danny Fortson were both traded to the Dallas Mavericks, after Jamison spent five seasons with the Warriors. Meanwhile, Sura was traded to the Detroit Pistons, Boykins signed as a free agent with the Denver Nuggets, and Chris Mills retired.

== Draft ==
Round	Pick	Player	Position	Nationality	College
1	3	Mike Dunleavy Jr.	SG	United States	Duke
2	30	Steve Logan	PG	United States	Cincinnati

== Roster ==
2002–03 Golden State Warriors roster
Players

Pos.	No.	Player	Height	Weight	DOB	From
G	0	Gilbert Arenas	6 ft 3 in (1.91 m)	191 lb (87 kg)		Arizona
G	11	Earl Boykins	5 ft 5 in (1.65 m)	135 lb (61 kg)		Eastern Michigan
C	25	Erick Dampier	6 ft 11 in (2.11 m)	265 lb (120 kg)		Mississippi State
G/F	10	Mike Dunleavy Jr.	6 ft 9 in (2.06 m)	220 lb (100 kg)		Duke
F/C	21	Danny Fortson	6 ft 7 in (2.01 m)	260 lb (118 kg)		Cincinnati
C	31	Adonal Foyle	6 ft 10 in (2.08 m)	270 lb (122 kg)		Colgate
F	33	Antawn Jamison	6 ft 8 in (2.03 m)	223 lb (101 kg)		North Carolina
F	34	Chris Mills	6 ft 6 in (1.98 m)	215 lb (98 kg)		Arizona
F	1	Troy Murphy	6 ft 11 in (2.11 m)	245 lb (111 kg)		Notre Dame
G/F	23	Jason Richardson	6 ft 6 in (1.98 m)	220 lb (100 kg)		Michigan State
G	3	Bob Sura	6 ft 5 in (1.96 m)	200 lb (91 kg)		Florida State
G/F	4	Jiří Welsch	6 ft 7 in (2.01 m)	208 lb (94 kg)		Czech Republic

Coaches
Head coach
- Eric Musselman
Assistant(s)
- Hank Egan
- Phil Hubbard
- Mark Osowski
- Tom Sterner

Legend
- (DP) Unsigned draft pick
- (FA) Free agent
- (S) Suspended
- Injured

Roster

== Regular season ==
=== Season standings ===
Pacific Division	W	L	PCT	GB	Home	Road	Div
y-Sacramento Kings	59	23	.720	–	35–6	24–17	17–7
x-Los Angeles Lakers	50	32	.610	9	31–10	19–22	15–9
x-Portland Trail Blazers	50	32	.610	9	27–14	23–18	15–9
x-Phoenix Suns	44	38	.537	15	30–11	14–27	12–12
e-Seattle SuperSonics	40	42	.488	19	25–16	15–26	11–13
e-Golden State Warriors	38	44	.463	21	24–17	14–27	8–16
e-Los Angeles Clippers	27	55	.329	32	16–25	11–30	6–18

#	Western Conference				
#	Team	W	L	PCT	GB
1	z-San Antonio Spurs	60	22	.732	–
2	y-Sacramento Kings	59	23	.720	1
3	x-Dallas Mavericks	60	22	.732	–
4	x-Minnesota Timberwolves	51	31	.622	9
5	x-Los Angeles Lakers	50	32	.610	10
6	x-Portland Trail Blazers	50	32	.610	10
7	x-Utah Jazz	47	35	.573	13
8	x-Phoenix Suns	44	38	.537	16
9	e-Houston Rockets	43	39	.524	17
10	e-Seattle SuperSonics	40	42	.488	20
11	e-Golden State Warriors	38	44	.463	22
12	e-Memphis Grizzlies	28	54	.341	32
13	e-Los Angeles Clippers	27	55	.329	33
14	e-Denver Nuggets	17	65	.207	43

z - clinched division title
y - clinched division title
x - clinched playoff spot

== Player statistics ==
Legend
GP	Games played	GS	Games started	MPG	Minutes per game
FG%	Field-goal percentage	3P%	3-point field-goal percentage	FT%	Free-throw percentage
RPG	Rebounds per game	APG	Assists per game	SPG	Steals per game
BPG	Blocks per game	PPG	Points per game

=== Regular season ===
Player	GP	GS	MPG	FG%	3P%	FT%	RPG	APG	SPG	BPG	PPG
Antawn Jamison	82	82	39.3	.470	.311	.789	7.0	1.9	.9	.5	22.2
Gilbert Arenas	82	82	35.0	.431	.348	.791	4.7	6.3	1.5	.2	18.3
Jason Richardson	82	82	32.9	.410	.368	.764	4.6	3.0	1.1	.3	15.6
Erick Dampier	82	82	24.1	.496	.000	.698	6.6	.7	.3	1.9	8.2
Mike Dunleavy Jr.	82	3	15.9	.403	.347	.780	2.6	1.3	.6	.2	5.7
Adonal Foyle	82	0	21.8	.536	.000	.673	6.0	.5	.5	2.5	5.4
Troy Murphy	79	79	31.8	.451	.214	.841	10.2	1.3	.8	.4	11.7
Earl Boykins	68	0	19.4	.429	.377	.865	1.3	3.3	.6	.1	8.8
Bob Sura	55	0	20.5	.412	.329	.696	3.0	3.2	.8	.0	7.3
Jiří Welsch	37	0	6.3	.253	.250	.759	.8	.7	.2	.1	1.6
Chris Mills	21	0	12.5	.368	.280	.889	2.4	1.0	.3	.1	4.8
Danny Fortson	17	0	13.1	.370	.000	.655	4.3	.7	.5	.0	3.5
Óscar Torres	17	0	6.4	.444	.538	.700	.7	.2	.2	.1	3.1
Dean Oliver	15	0	6.2	.241	.167	.875	1.1	1.5	.5	.0	1.5
Guy Rucker	3	0	1.3				.3	.3	.0	.0	.0
A. J. Guyton	2	0	4.5	.000	.000		.0	1.0	.5	.0	.0

- ^{†} Denotes player spent time with another team in the season. Stats reflect time with the Warriors only.

Player statistics citation:

== See also ==
- 2002-03 NBA season
