= 2002–03 Los Angeles Lakers season =

NBA professional basketball team season

- Head coach: Phil Jackson
- General manager: Mitch Kupchak
- Owner: Jerry Buss
- Arena: Staples Center

Results
- Record: 50–32 (.610)
- Place: Division: 2nd (Pacific); Conference: 5th (Western)
- Playoff finish: Conference semifinals (lost to Spurs 2–4)
- Stats at Basketball Reference

Local media
- Television: FSN West; KCAL
- Radio: AM 570 KLAC

The 2002–03 Los Angeles Lakers season was the 55th season for the Los Angeles Lakers in the National Basketball Association, and their 43rd season in Los Angeles, California. The Lakers entered the regular season as the 3-time defending NBA champions, having defeated the New Jersey Nets in a four-game sweep in the 2002 NBA Finals, winning their 14th NBA championship.

== Season summary ==
=== Off-season ===
The Lakers' off-season was overshadowed by the death of their long-time broadcaster Chick Hearn, who died at the age of 85 after a fall during the summer of 2002. To pay tribute, the Lakers revealed new alternate white home uniforms, which featured the team name "Lakers" on the front of their jerseys, a purple trim, and golden yellow side panels with purple inlines; both legs of their shorts featured their alternate logo of a purple letter "L" in front of a golden yellow basketball. These uniforms were only worn on Christmas and Sunday home games. The uniforms made their debut in a home loss against the Sacramento Kings on Christmas Day; they were designed by late owner Jerry Buss' daughter, who is now the controlling owner and president of the Lakers, Jeanie.

=== Regular season ===
With All-Star center Shaquille O'Neal sidelined early into the regular season after an off-season right foot and toe surgery, the Lakers struggled losing nine of their first twelve games. O'Neal eventually returned, but the team still struggled with an 11–19 record 30 games into the season, which was their worst start since the 1993–94 season. However, the Lakers soon recovered from their slow start, playing above .500 in winning percentage for the remainder of the season, and holding a 24–23 record at the All-Star break, which was ninth place in the Western Conference at the time, and out of playoff position. The Lakers won 11 of their final 13 games of the season, and finished in second place in the Pacific Division with a solid 50–32 record, earning the fifth seed in the Western Conference; the team qualified for the NBA playoffs for the ninth consecutive year.

This season saw All-Star guard, and co-captain Kobe Bryant play all 82 games for the first time in his NBA career, as he averaged 30.0 points, 6.9 rebounds, 5.9 assists and 2.2 steals per game, and also led the Lakers with 124 three-point field goals, while O'Neal averaged 27.5 points, 11.1 rebounds and 2.4 blocks per game. In addition, Derek Fisher provided the team with 10.5 points and 3.6 assists per game, while Rick Fox contributed 9.0 points per game and 105 three-point field goals, and Robert Horry provided with 6.5 points and 6.4 rebounds per game. Meanwhile, Samaki Walker averaged 4.4 points and 5.5 rebounds per game, while Brian Shaw contributed 3.5 points per game, and Mark Madsen provided with 3.2 points and 2.9 rebounds per game.

During the NBA All-Star weekend at the Philips Arena in Atlanta, Georgia, Bryant and O'Neal were both selected for the 2003 NBA All-Star Game, as members of the Western Conference All-Star team. Bryant and O'Neal were both named to the All-NBA First Team, while Bryant was named to the NBA All-Defensive First Team, and O'Neal was named to the NBA All-Defensive Second Team. Bryant finished in third place in Most Valuable Player voting with 8 first-place votes, while O'Neal finished in fifth place with 3 first-place votes; Bryant also finished in eighth place in Defensive Player of the Year voting, while O'Neal finished tied in 13th place, and head coach Phil Jackson finished in 14th place in Coach of the Year voting.

The Lakers finished ninth in the NBA in home-game attendance, with an attendance of 777,888 at the Staples Center during the regular season.

=== NBA playoffs ===
In the Western Conference First Round of the 2003 NBA playoffs, the Lakers faced off against the 4th–seeded Minnesota Timberwolves, who were led by All-Star forward Kevin Garnett, All-Star forward Wally Szczerbiak, and Troy Hudson. Starting the first round of the NBA playoffs without home-court advantage for the first time since the 1994–95 season, the Lakers won Game 1 over the Timberwolves on the road, 117–98 at the Target Center, but then lost the next two games, which included a Game 3 home loss at the Staples Center in overtime, 114–110 as the Timberwolves took a 2–1 series lead. However, the Lakers managed to win the next three games, including a Game 6 win over the Timberwolves at the Staples Center, 101–85 to win the series in six games.

In the Western Conference Semi-finals, and for the second consecutive year, the team faced off against the top–seeded, and Midwest Division champion San Antonio Spurs, who were led by the trio of All-Star forward, and Most Valuable Player of the Year, Tim Duncan, second-year star Tony Parker, and David Robinson. The Lakers lost the first two games to the Spurs on the road at the SBC Center, but managed to win the next two games at home, which included a Game 4 win over the Spurs at the Staples Center, 99–95 to even the series. However, the Lakers lost the next two games, including a Game 6 loss to the Spurs at the Staples Center, 110–82, thus losing the series in six games.

The Spurs would go on to defeat the New Jersey Nets in six games in the 2003 NBA Finals, winning their second NBA championship in franchise history.

=== Aftermath ===
Following the season, Horry signed as a free agent with the San Antonio Spurs, while Madsen signed with the Minnesota Timberwolves, Walker signed with the Miami Heat, and Shaw retired.

== Draft picks ==
Round	Pick	Player	Position	Nationality	College
1	27	Chris Jefferies	SF	United States	Fresno State

== Roster ==
2002–03 Los Angeles Lakers roster
Players

Pos.	No.	Player	Height	Weight	DOB	From
G	8	Kobe Bryant	6 ft 6 in (1.98 m)	205 lb (93 kg)	1978–08–23	Lower Merion HS
G	2	Derek Fisher	6 ft 1 in (1.85 m)	210 lb (95 kg)	1974–08–09	Little Rock
F	17	Rick Fox	6 ft 7 in (2.01 m)	230 lb (104 kg)	1969–07–24	North Carolina
F	3	Devean George	6 ft 8 in (2.03 m)	235 lb (107 kg)	1977–08–29	Augsburg
F	5	Robert Horry	6 ft 10 in (2.08 m)	240 lb (109 kg)	1970–08–25	Alabama
F	35	Mark Madsen	6 ft 9 in (2.06 m)	240 lb (109 kg)	1976–01–28	Stanford
F	14	Slava Medvedenko	6 ft 10 in (2.08 m)	253 lb (115 kg)	1979–04–04	Ukraine
F	30	Tracy Murray	6 ft 7 in (2.01 m)	225 lb (102 kg)	1971–07–25	UCLA
C	34	Shaquille O'Neal	7 ft 1 in (2.16 m)	325 lb (147 kg)	1972–03–06	LSU
G	12	Jannero Pargo	6 ft 1 in (1.85 m)	175 lb (79 kg)	1979–10–22	Arkansas
G	21	Kareem Rush	6 ft 5 in (1.96 m)	200 lb (91 kg)	1980–10–30	Missouri
G	20	Brian Shaw	6 ft 6 in (1.98 m)	190 lb (86 kg)	1966–03–22	UC Santa Barbara
F/C	52	Samaki Walker	6 ft 9 in (2.06 m)	250 lb (113 kg)	1976–02–25	Louisville

Coaches
Head coach
- Phil Jackson
Assistant(s)
- Jim Cleamons
- Frank Hamblen
- Kurt Rambis
- Tex Winter

Legend
- (DP) Unsigned draft pick
- (FA) Free agent
- (S) Suspended
- Injured

Roster
Updated: December 6, 2002

== Regular season ==
=== Season standings ===
Pacific Division	W	L	PCT	GB	Home	Road	Div
y-Sacramento Kings	59	23	.720	–	35–6	24–17	17–7
x-Los Angeles Lakers	50	32	.610	9	31–10	19–22	15–9
x-Portland Trail Blazers	50	32	.610	9	27–14	23–18	15–9
x-Phoenix Suns	44	38	.537	15	30–11	14–27	12–12
e-Seattle SuperSonics	40	42	.488	19	25–16	15–26	11–13
e-Golden State Warriors	38	44	.463	21	24–17	14–27	8–16
e-Los Angeles Clippers	27	55	.329	32	16–25	11–30	6–18

#	Western Conference				
#	Team	W	L	PCT	GB
1	z-San Antonio Spurs	60	22	.732	–
2	y-Sacramento Kings	59	23	.720	1
3	x-Dallas Mavericks	60	22	.732	–
4	x-Minnesota Timberwolves	51	31	.622	9
5	x-Los Angeles Lakers	50	32	.610	10
6	x-Portland Trail Blazers	50	32	.610	10
7	x-Utah Jazz	47	35	.573	13
8	x-Phoenix Suns	44	38	.537	16
9	e-Houston Rockets	43	39	.524	17
10	e-Seattle SuperSonics	40	42	.488	20
11	e-Golden State Warriors	38	44	.463	22
12	e-Memphis Grizzlies	28	54	.341	32
13	e-Los Angeles Clippers	27	55	.329	33
14	e-Denver Nuggets	17	65	.207	43

z - clinched division title
y - clinched division title
x - clinched playoff spot

== Game log ==
=== Pre-season ===
2002 preseason game log
Total: 3–5
Preseason

Game	Date	Team	Score	High points	High rebounds	High assists	Location Attendance	Record
1	October 8	L.A. Clippers	L 99-101	3 players tied (13)	Bryant & Samake (6)	Kobe Bryant (4)	Centennial Garden (Bakersfield, CA); 10,097	0–1
2	October 11	Memphis	W 95-87	Kobe Bryant (18)	Soumaila Samake (13)	Jannero Pargo (7)	Alltel Arena (Little Rock, AR); 14,672	1-1
3	October 12	Denver	L 81–103	Kobe Bryant (20)	Soumaila Samake (8)		Ford Center (Oklahoma City, OK); 13,952	1–2
4	October 17	Golden State	W 91–89	Kobe Bryant (22)	Samaki Walker (13)		Arrowhead Pond (Anaheim, CA); 17,027	2-2
5	October 19	Phoenix	L 84–90	Kobe Bryant (23)	Samaki Walker (15)		Thomas & Mack Center (Las Vegas, NV); 16,172	2–3
6	October 22	Cleveland	L 101-102	Derek Fisher (18)	Slava Medvedenko (8)	Rick Fox (6)	San Diego Sports Arena (San Diego, CA); 13,644	2–4
7	October 24	Milwaukee	W 98-93	Tracy Murray (21)	Soumaila Samake (9)	Slava Medvedenko (5)	Staples Center; 15,127	3–4
8	October 25	Sacramento	L 88-93	Kobe Bryant (23)	Devean George (9)	Kobe Bryant (12)	Staples Center; 18,997	3–5

2002–03 season schedule

=== Regular season ===
2002–03 game log
Total: 50–32 (home: 31–10; road: 19–22)
October: 0–2 (home: 0–1; road: 0–1)

Game	Date	Team	Score	High points	High rebounds	High assists	Location Attendance	Record
1	October 29	San Antonio	L 91-93	Kobe Bryant (25)	Robert Horry (10)	Kobe Bryant (5)	Staples Center; 18,997	0–1
2	October 30	@ Portland	L 99–105	Kobe Bryant (33)	Samaki Walker (9)	Kobe Bryant (7)	Rose Garden; 20,225	0–2

November: 6–9 (home: 4–2; road: 2–7)

Game	Date	Team	Score	High points	High rebounds	High assists	Location Attendance	Record
3	November 1	@ L.A. Clippers	W 101-94	Kobe Bryant (30)	Robert Horry (11)	Derek Fisher (8)	Staples Center; 20,474	1–2
4	November 3	Portland	W 98-95 (OT)	Kobe Bryant (33)	Kobe Bryant (14)	Kobe Bryant (12)	Staples Center; 18,997	2-2
5	November 5	@ Cleveland	L 70-89	Kobe Bryant (15)	Kobe Bryant (13)	Kobe Bryant (9)	Gund Arena; 19,833	2–3
6	November 7	@ Boston	L 95-98 (OT)	Kobe Bryant (41)	Samaki Walker (12)	Robert Horry (5)	Fleet Center; 18,624	2–4
7	November 8	@ Washington	L 99–100	Kobe Bryant (27)	Rick Fox (8)	Robert Horry (5)	MCI Center; 20,173	2–5
8	November 12	Atlanta	L 83–95	Kobe Bryant (21)	Samaki Walker (10)	Kobe Bryant (8)	Staples Center; 18,997	2–6
9	November 15	Golden State	W 96-89 (OT)	Kobe Bryant (45)	Fox & Walker (14)	Brian Shaw (8)	Staples Center; 18,997	3–6
10	November 17	Houston	L 89–93	Kobe Bryant (46)	Horry & Walker (9)	Kobe Bryant (4)	Staples Center; 18,997	3–7
11	November 19	@ Dallas	L 72-98	Kobe Bryant (16)	Fox & Walker (9)	Kobe Bryant (5)	American Airlines Center; 20,096	3–8
12	November 20	@ San Antonio	L 88-95	Kobe Bryant (24)	Samaki Walker (10)	Kobe Bryant (7)	SBC Center; 18,797	3–9
13	November 22	Chicago	W 86–73	Kobe Bryant (21)	Kobe Bryant (10)	Kobe Bryant (7)	Staples Center; 18,997	4–9
14	November 24	Milwaukee	W 111–99	Shaquille O'Neal (24)	Bryant & O'Neal (11)	Kobe Bryant (11)	Staples Center; 18,997	5–9
15	November 26	@ Miami	L 85-97	Kobe Bryant (21)	Robert Horry (9)	Kobe Bryant (4)	American Airlines Arena; 16,500	5–10
16	November 27	@ Orlando	L 102–112	Kobe Bryant (38)	Bryant & Fox (10)	Fox & Horry (6)	TD Waterhouse Centre; 17,283	5–11
17	November 29	@ Memphis	W 112-106 (OT)	Kobe Bryant (45)	Shaquille O'Neal (13)	Rick Fox (6)	Pyramid Arena; 19,351	6–11

December: 7–8 (home: 5–3; road: 2–5)

Game	Date	Team	Score	High points	High rebounds	High assists	Location Attendance	Record
18	December 1	Minnesota	L 107-110	Shaquille O'Neal (31)	Shaquille O'Neal (13)	Kobe Bryant (11)	Staples Center; 18,997	6–12
19	December 3	Memphis	W 101-91	Shaquille O'Neal (28)	Kobe Bryant (10)	Kobe Bryant (11)	Staples Center; 18,512	7–12
20	December 4	@ Utah	L 85-93	Shaquille O'Neal (23)	Shaquille O'Neal (15)	Kobe Bryant (5)	Delta Center; 19,657	7–13
21	December 6	Dallas	W 105-103	Kobe Bryant (27)	Shaquille O'Neal (11)	Kobe Bryant (7)	Staples Center; 18,997	8–13
22	December 8	Utah	W 110-101	Shaquille O'Neal (32)	Shaquille O'Neal (11)	Kobe Bryant (14)	Staples Center; 18,997	9–13
23	December 10	@ Golden State	L 102-106	Shaquille O'Neal (36)	Robert Horry (12)	Kobe Bryant (14)	The Arena in Oakland; 19,596	9–14
24	December 13	New Orleans	L 82-98	Shaquille O'Neal (28)	Shaquille O'Neal (10)	Derek Fisher (6)	Staples Center; 18,997	9–15
25	December 15	Orlando	W 107-84	Shaquille O'Neal (30)	Shaquille O'Neal (14)	Kobe Bryant (8)	Staples Center; 18,997	10–15
26	December 17	@ Minnesota	L 80-96	Shaquille O'Neal (17)	Shaquille O'Neal (9)	Kobe Bryant (6)	Target Center; 16,447	10–16
27	December 19	@ New Jersey	L 71-98	Kobe Bryant (21)	Robert Horry (11)	Kobe Bryant (5)	Continental Airlines Arena; 20,049	10–17
28	December 20	@ Philadelphia	L 104-107 (OT)	Kobe Bryant (44)	Shaquille O'Neal (14)	Kobe Bryant (10)	First Union Center; 21,127	10–18
29	December 22	@ Toronto	W 109-107 (OT)	Bryant & O'Neal (31)	Shaquille O'Neal (15)	Derek Fisher (7)	Air Canada Centre; 19,800	11–18
30	December 25	Sacramento	L 99-105	Bryant & O'Neal (27)	Shaquille O'Neal (17)	Kobe Bryant (6)	Staples Center; 18,997	11–19
31	December 28	@ Denver	W 112-93	Kobe Bryant (39)	Shaquille O'Neal (13)	Derek Fisher (9)	Pepsi Center; 19,099	12–19
32	December 29	Toronto	W 104-88	Shaquille O'Neal (35)	Shaquille O'Neal (10)	Kobe Bryant (12)	Staples Center; 18,997	13–19

January: 8–4 (home: 5–2; road: 3–2)

Game	Date	Team	Score	High points	High rebounds	High assists	Location Attendance	Record
33	January 4	@ Phoenix	L 93-107	Kobe Bryant (37)	Shaquille O'Neal (9)	Kobe Bryant (7)	American West Arena; 19,023	13–20
34	January 5	Phoenix	W 109-97	Shaquille O'Neal (36)	Shaquille O'Neal (16)	Rick Fox (8)	Staples Center; 18,642	14–20
35	January 7	Seattle	W 119-98	Kobe Bryant (45)	Robert Horry (8)	Shaquille O'Neal (7)	Staples Center; 18,997	15–20
36	January 10	Cleveland	W 115-99	Shaquille O'Neal (26)	Kobe Bryant (10)	Kobe Bryant (11)	Staples Center; 18,997	16–20
37	January 12	Miami	W 106-81	Kobe Bryant (36)	Samaki Walker (16)	Shaquille O'Neal (5)	Staples Center; 18,997	17–20
38	January 15	@ New Orleans	W 90-82	Kobe Bryant (36)	Bryant & O'Neal (11)	Kobe Bryant (4)	New Orleans Arena; 18,509	18–20
39	January 17	@ Houston	L 104-108 (OT)	Shaquille O'Neal (31)	Shaquille O'Neal (13)	Kobe Bryant (9)	Compaq Center; 16,285	18–21
40	January 20	L.A. Clippers	W 96-92	Shaquille O'Neal (32)	O'Neal & Walker (15)	Kobe Bryant (11)	Staples Center; 18,997	19–21
41	January 22	Golden State	L 110-114	Shaquille O'Neal (28)	Shaquille O'Neal (9)	Kobe Bryant (7)	Staples Center; 18,997	19–22
42	January 24	New Jersey	L 83-89	Shaquille O'Neal (27)	Shaquille O'Neal (13)	Bryant & Fisher (5)	Staples Center; 18,997	19–23
43	January 29	@ Phoenix	W 99-90	Kobe Bryant (40)	Shaquille O'Neal (12)	Shaquille O'Neal (6)	American West Arena; 18,437	20–23
44	January 31	@ Sacramento	W 124-113	Kobe Bryant (38)	Shaquille O'Neal (10)	Shaquille O'Neal (6)	ARCO Arena; 17,317	21–23

February: 11–3 (home: 7–2; road: 4–1)

Game	Date	Team	Score	High points	High rebounds	High assists	Location Attendance	Record
45	February 1	Utah	W 99-87	Kobe Bryant (42)	Shaquille O'Neal (13)	Robert Horry (6)	Staples Center; 18,997	22–23
46	February 4	@ Indiana	W 97-94	Kobe Bryant (35)	Shaquille O'Neal (12)	Fisher & Fox (5)	Conseco Fieldhouse; 18,345	23-23
47	February 6	@ New York	W 114-109	Kobe Bryant (46)	Robert Horry (12)	Shaquille O'Neal (7)	Madison Square Garden; 19,763	24–23
All-Star Break
48	February 11	Denver	W 121-93	Kobe Bryant (42)	Kareem Rush (9)	4 players tied (5)	Staples Center; 18,848	25–23
49	February 12	@ Denver	W 113-102	Kobe Bryant (51)	Samaki Walker (14)	Bryant & Fox (4)	Pepsi Center; 17,757	26–23
50	February 14	San Antonio	L 95-103	Kobe Bryant (44)	Robert Horry (15)	Robert Horry (6)	Staples Center; 18,997	26–24
51	February 16	New York	L 110-117	Kobe Bryant (40)	Robert Horry (11)	Derek Fisher (8)	Staples Center; 18,997	26–25
52	February 18	Houston	W 106-99 (2OT)	Kobe Bryant (52)	Robert Horry (11)	Kobe Bryant (7)	Staples Center; 18,997	27–25
53	February 19	@ Utah	W 93-87	Kobe Bryant (40)	Bryant & George (6)	Derek Fisher (4)	Delta Center; 19,911	28–25
54	February 21	Portland	W 92-84	Kobe Bryant (40)	Shaquille O'Neal (12)	Robert Horry (5)	Staples Center; 18,997	29–25
55	February 23	Seattle	W 106-101	Kobe Bryant (41)	Shaquille O'Neal (17)	Kareem Rush (7)	Staples Center; 18,997	30–25
56	February 25	L.A. Clippers	W 109-98	Shaquille O'Neal (33)	Robert Horry (10)	Rick Fox (8)	Staples Center; 18,997	31–25
57	February 27	Detroit	W 95-85	Shaquille O'Neal (35)	Shaquille O'Neal (14)	Rick Fox (6)	Staples Center; 18,997	32–25
58	February 28	@ Seattle	L 90-107	Kobe Bryant (34)	Shaquille O'Neal (11)	Kobe Bryant (9)	KeyArena; 17,072	32–26

March: 11–5 (home: 6–0; road: 5–5)

Game	Date	Team	Score	High points	High rebounds	High assists	Location Attendance	Record
59	March 5	Indiana	W 97-95	Shaquille O'Neal (26)	Shaquille O'Neal (11)	Robert Horry (6)	Staples Center; 18,997	33–26
60	March 7	Minnesota	W 106-96	Shaquille O'Neal (40)	Shaquille O'Neal (14)	Kobe Bryant (7)	Staples Center; 18,997	34–26
61	March 9	Philadelphia	W 106-92	Shaquille O'Neal (39)	Shaquille O'Neal (10)	Kobe Bryant (9)	Staples Center; 18,997	35–26
62	March 11	@ Chicago	L 99-116	Kobe Bryant (36)	Shaquille O'Neal (10)	Bryant & Fisher (5)	United Center; 23,122	35–27
63	March 12	@ Detroit	L 88-111	Shaquille O'Neal (24)	Shaquille O'Neal (13)	Derek Fisher (5)	The Palace of Auburn Hills; 22,076	35–28
64	March 14	@ Minnesota	W 106-99	Kobe Bryant (30)	Shaquille O'Neal (15)	Shaquille O'Neal (6)	Target Center; 20,199	36–28
65	March 15	@ Milwaukee	W 98-94	Shaquille O'Neal (24)	Shaquille O'Neal (11)	3 players tied (5)	Bradley Center; 18,717	37–28
66	March 17	@ L.A. Clippers	W 102-85	Shaquille O'Neal (42)	Bryant & O'Neal (7)	Kobe Bryant (6)	Staples Center; 20,101	38–28
67	March 20	@ Sacramento	L 99-107	Kobe Bryant (34)	Bryant & O'Neal (13)	Robert Horry (5)	ARCO Arena; 17,317	38–29
68	March 21	Boston	W 104-96	Shaquille O'Neal (48)	Shaquille O'Neal (20)	Kobe Bryant (7)	Staples Center; 18,997	39–29
69	March 23	@ San Antonio	L 89-98	Shaquille O'Neal (32)	Shaquille O'Neal (12)	Derek Fisher (3)	SBC Center; 18,797	39–30
70	March 25	@ Atlanta	W 108-91	Shaquille O'Neal (31)	Kobe Bryant (10)	Bryant & Fisher (6)	Philips Arena; 19,870	40–30
71	March 26	@ Houston	W 96-93	Shaquille O'Neal (39)	Kobe Bryant (9)	Kobe Bryant (5)	Compaq Center; 16,285	41–30
72	March 28	Washington	W 108-94	Kobe Bryant (55)	Shaquille O'Neal (13)	Derek Fisher (7)	Staples Center; 18,997	42–30
73	March 30	@ Seattle	L 98-119	Shaquille O'Neal (34)	Robert Horry (8)	Rick Fox (6)	KeyArena; 17,072	42–31
74	March 31	Memphis	W 110-94	Shaquille O'Neal (34)	Shaquille O'Neal (11)	Kobe Bryant (8)	Staples Center; 18,997	43–31

April: 7–1 (home: 4–0; road: 3–1)

Game	Date	Team	Score	High points	High rebounds	High assists	Location Attendance	Record
75	April 3	@ Dallas	W 100-89	Shaquille O'Neal (31)	Shaquille O'Neal (17)	Kobe Bryant (6)	American Airlines Center; 20,129	44–31
76	April 4	@ Memphis	W 102-101	Shaquille O'Neal (33)	Shaquille O'Neal (19)	Kobe Bryant (6)	Pyramid Arena; 19,351	45–31
77	April 6	Phoenix	W 115-113 (OT)	Kobe Bryant (26)	Shaquille O'Neal (13)	Bryant & O'Neal (7)	Staples Center; 18,997	46–31
78	April 8	Dallas	W 108-99	Devean George (21)	Horry & O'Neal (10)	Derek Fisher (8)	Staples Center; 18,997	47–31
79	April 10	Sacramento	W 117-104	Kobe Bryant (34)	Shaquille O'Neal (16)	Derek Fisher (8)	Staples Center; 18,997	48–31
80	April 13	@ Portland	L 99-101	Bryant & O'Neal (36)	Shaquille O'Neal (11)	Kobe Bryant (7)	Rose Garden; 20,580	48–32
81	April 15	Denver	W 126-104	Kobe Bryant (32)	Kobe Bryant (8)	Jannero Pargo (5)	Staples Center; 18,997	49–32
82	April 16	@ Golden State	W 117-111	Kobe Bryant (44)	Shaquille O'Neal (12)	Robert Horry (6)	The Arena in Oakland; 20,234	50–32

2002–03 schedule

=== Playoffs ===
2003 playoff game log
Total: 6–6 (home: 4–2; road: 2–4)
First round: 4–2 (home: 2–1; road: 2–1)

Game	Date	Team	Score	High points	High rebounds	High assists	Location Attendance	Series
1	April 20	@ Minnesota	W 117–98	Kobe Bryant (39)	Shaquille O'Neal (10)	Bryant & Horry (8)	Target Center; 17,097	1–0
2	April 22	@ Minnesota	L 91–119	Bryant & O'Neal (27)	Shaquille O'Neal (14)	Kobe Bryant (8)	Target Center; 17,132	1–1
3	April 24	Minnesota	L 110–114 (OT)	Kobe Bryant (30)	Shaquille O'Neal (17)	Kobe Bryant (6)	Staples Center; 18,997	1–2
4	April 27	Minnesota	W 102–97	Shaquille O'Neal (34)	Shaquille O'Neal (23)	Shaquille O'Neal (6)	Staples Center; 18,997	2–2
5	April 29	@ Minnesota	W 120–90	Kobe Bryant (32)	Shaquille O'Neal (11)	Devean George (6)	Target Center; 20,098	3–2
6	May 1	Minnesota	W 101–85	Kobe Bryant (31)	Shaquille O'Neal (17)	Shaquille O'Neal (9)	Staples Center; 18,997	4–2

Conference Semi-finals: 2–4 (home: 2–1; road: 0–3)

Game	Date	Team	Score	High points	High rebounds	High assists	Location Attendance	Series
1	May 5	@ San Antonio	L 82–87	Kobe Bryant (37)	Shaquille O'Neal (21)	Shaquille O'Neal (3)	SBC Center; 18,797	0–1
2	May 7	@ San Antonio	L 95–114	Bryant & O'Neal (27)	Shaquille O'Neal (10)	Jannero Pargo (3)	SBC Center; 18,797	0–2
3	May 9	San Antonio	W 110–95	Kobe Bryant (39)	Shaquille O'Neal (16)	Shaquille O'Neal (8)	Staples Center; 18,997	1–2
4	May 11	San Antonio	W 99–95	Kobe Bryant (35)	Shaquille O'Neal (17)	Shaquille O'Neal (5)	Staples Center; 18,997	2–2
5	May 13	@ San Antonio	L 94–96	Kobe Bryant (36)	Shaquille O'Neal (12)	Kobe Bryant (6)	SBC Center; 18,797	2–3
6	May 15	San Antonio	L 82–110	Shaquille O'Neal (31)	Shaquille O'Neal (10)	Kobe Bryant (6)	Staples Center; 18,997	2–4

2003 schedule

== Player statistics ==
Legend
GP	Games played	GS	Games started	MPG	Minutes per game
FG%	Field-goal percentage	3P%	3-point field-goal percentage	FT%	Free-throw percentage
RPG	Rebounds per game	APG	Assists per game	SPG	Steals per game
BPG	Blocks per game	PPG	Points per game

=== Regular season ===
Player	GP	GS	MPG	FG%	3P%	FT%	RPG	APG	SPG	BPG	PPG
Kobe Bryant	82	82	41.5	.451	.383	.843	6.9	5.9	2.2	.8	30.0
Derek Fisher	82	82	34.5	.437	.401	.800	2.9	3.6	1.1	.2	10.5
Rick Fox	76	75	28.7	.422	.375	.754	4.3	3.3	.9	.2	9.0
Devean George	71	7	22.7	.390	.371	.790	4.0	1.3	.8	.5	6.9
Robert Horry	80	26	29.3	.387	.288	.769	6.4	2.9	1.2	.8	6.5
Mark Madsen	54	22	14.5	.423	.	.590	2.9	.7	.3	.4	3.2
Stanislav Medvedenko	58	10	10.7	.434	.000	.721	2.4	.3	.2	.1	4.4
Tracy Murray	31	0	6.2	.324	.211	.778	.7	.4	.2	.1	2.0
Shaquille O'Neal	67	66	37.8	.574	.	.622	11.1	3.1	.6	2.4	27.5
Jannero Pargo	34	0	10.1	.398	.292	1.000	1.1	1.1	.4	.1	2.5
Kareem Rush	76	0	11.5	.393	.279	.696	1.2	.9	.1	.1	3.0
Soumaila Samake	13	1	5.9	.417	.	1.000	1.8	.3	.0	.4	1.7
Brian Shaw	72	0	12.5	.387	.349	.667	1.7	1.4	.4	.2	3.5
Samaki Walker	67	39	18.6	.420	.000	.653	5.5	1.0	.3	.8	4.4

=== Playoffs ===
Player	GP	GS	MPG	FG%	3P%	FT%	RPG	APG	SPG	BPG	PPG
Kobe Bryant	12	12	44.3	.432	.403	.827	5.1	5.2	1.2	.1	32.1
Derek Fisher	12	12	35.3	.520	.617	.818	3.0	1.8	1.5	.1	12.8
Rick Fox	4	4	19.8	.444	.500	.750	1.5	1.8	.3	.3	6.0
Devean George	11	7	28.9	.449	.333	.889	4.5	2.2	1.0	.4	8.0
Robert Horry	12	10	31.1	.319	.053	.556	6.7	3.1	1.3	1.0	5.6
Mark Madsen	12	2	14.1	.419	.000	.438	2.3	1.0	.3	.2	2.8
Stanislav Medvedenko	9	0	8.1	.556	.	.667	2.0	.1	.1	.1	3.8
Shaquille O'Neal	12	12	40.1	.535	.	.621	14.8	3.7	.6	2.8	27.0
Jannero Pargo	11	0	11.7	.333	.267	.750	.8	1.3	.7	.1	2.1
Kareem Rush	9	0	7.1	.379	.364	1.000	.3	.2	.1	.0	3.3
Brian Shaw	12	1	17.9	.306	.391	.667	3.2	2.0	.3	.4	3.2
Samaki Walker	9	0	5.4	.400	.	.	1.4	.2	.1	.2	.4

Player statistics citation:

== Awards and records ==
- Shaquille O'Neal, All-NBA First Team
- Kobe Bryant, All-NBA First Team
- Kobe Bryant, NBA All-Defensive First Team
- Shaquille O'Neal, NBA All-Defensive Second Team
