= 2002–03 Houston Rockets season =

- Head coach: Rudy Tomjanovich
- General manager: Carroll Dawson
- Owner: Leslie Alexander
- Arena: Compaq Center

Results
- Record: 43–39 (.524)
- Place: Division: 5th (Midwest); Conference: 9th
- Playoff finish: Did not qualify
- Stats at Basketball Reference

Local media
- Television: KNWS-TV; KHWB; Fox Sports Net Southwest
- Radio: KILT

The 2002–03 Houston Rockets season was the 36th season for the Houston Rockets in the National Basketball Association, and their 32nd season in Houston, Texas.

== Season summary ==
=== Off-season ===
After finishing with a 28–54 record the previous season, the Rockets won the NBA draft lottery, and selected 7'6" center, and Chinese basketball star Yao Ming with the first overall pick in the 2002 NBA draft.

=== Regular season ===
In December, the Rockets traded Kenny Thomas to the Philadelphia 76ers, and acquired James Posey from the Denver Nuggets in a three-team trade. With the addition of Yao, the Rockets got off to a 9–6 start to the regular season, and played .500 in winning percentage for the remainder of the season, holding a 26–22 record at the All-Star break. The team posted a five-game winning streak in March, and won five of their final seven games of the season. The Rockets finished in fifth place in the Midwest Division with a 43–39 record, which was a 15-game improvement over the previous season; however, the team missed the NBA playoffs by finishing just one game behind the 8th–seeded Phoenix Suns.

Yao averaged 13.5 points, 8.2 rebounds and 1.8 blocks per game, and was named to the NBA All-Rookie First Team, while Francis averaged 21.0 points, 6.2 rebounds, 6.2 assists and 1.7 steals per game, and Cuttino Mobley provided the team with 17.5 points per and 1.3 steals game, and also led them with 118 three-point field goals. In addition, Posey provided with 9.3 points, 4.8 rebounds and 1.3 steals per game in 58 games after the trade, while Glen Rice contributed 9.0 points per game and 101 three-point field goals, and second-year forward Eddie Griffin provided with 8.6 points, 6.0 rebounds and 1.4 blocks per game. Meanwhile, Maurice Taylor averaged 8.4 points and 3.6 rebounds per game, Kelvin Cato provided with 5.9 points, 4.5 rebounds and 1.2 blocks per game, and Moochie Norris contributed 4.4 points and 2.4 assists per game.

During the NBA All-Star weekend at the Philips Arena in Atlanta, Georgia, Francis and Yao were both selected for the 2003 NBA All-Star Game, as members of the Western Conference All-Star team; it was Yao's first ever All-Star appearance. Yao also finished in second place in Rookie of the Year voting, behind Amar'e Stoudemire of the Suns, while head coach Rudy Tomjanovich finished tied in 15th place in Coach of the Year voting.

The Rockets finished 27th in the NBA in home-game attendance, with an attendance of 565,166 at the Compaq Center during the regular season, which was the third-lowest in the league.

=== Notable highlights ===
One notable highlight of the regular season occurred on January 17, 2003, in a home game against the 3-time defending NBA champion Los Angeles Lakers at the Compaq Center. Francis posted a double-double of 44 points and 11 assists, and also made 6 out of 8 three-point field-goal attempts, as the Rockets defeated the Lakers in overtime, 108–104.

=== Aftermath ===
This was also the Rockets' final season in which they played their home games at the Compaq Center. Following the season, Tomjanovich resigned as head coach due to health issues, although he would return to coach the Los Angeles Lakers in 2004. Meanwhile, Posey signed as a free agent with the Memphis Grizzlies, while Griffin was released to free agency, and Rice was traded to the Utah Jazz, but was released and signed with the Los Angeles Clippers.

== Draft picks ==
Round	Pick	Player	Position	Nationality	College
1	1	Yao Ming	C	China	Shanghai Sharks (China)
1	15	Boštjan Nachbar (from Toronto)	SF	Slovenia	Benetton Treviso (Italy)
2	37	Tito Maddox	PG	United States	Fresno State So.

== Roster ==
2002–03 Houston Rockets roster
Players

Pos.	No.	Player	Height	Weight	DOB	From
F/C	13	Kelvin Cato	6 ft 11 in (2.11 m)	255 lb (116 kg)		Iowa State
C	52	Jason Collier	7 ft 0 in (2.13 m)	260 lb (118 kg)		Georgia Tech
G	3	Steve Francis	6 ft 3 in (1.91 m)	195 lb (88 kg)		Maryland
F/C	33	Eddie Griffin	6 ft 10 in (2.08 m)	220 lb (100 kg)		Seton Hall
G	1	Juaquin Hawkins	6 ft 7 in (2.01 m)	220 lb (100 kg)		Long Beach State
G	6	Tito Maddox	6 ft 4 in (1.93 m)	190 lb (86 kg)		Fresno State
G/F	5	Cuttino Mobley	6 ft 4 in (1.93 m)	190 lb (86 kg)		Rhode Island
F	44	Terence Morris	6 ft 9 in (2.06 m)	221 lb (100 kg)		Maryland
F	9	Boštjan Nachbar	6 ft 9 in (2.06 m)	221 lb (100 kg)		Slovenia
G	12	Moochie Norris	6 ft 1 in (1.85 m)	175 lb (79 kg)		West Florida
G/F	55	James Posey	6 ft 8 in (2.03 m)	215 lb (98 kg)		Xavier
F	41	Glen Rice	6 ft 7 in (2.01 m)	215 lb (98 kg)		Michigan
F/C	2	Maurice Taylor	6 ft 9 in (2.06 m)	260 lb (118 kg)		Michigan
C	11	Yao Ming	7 ft 6 in (2.29 m)	310 lb (141 kg)		China

Coaches
**Head coach**
- Rudy Tomjanovich
**Assistant(s)**
- Jim Boylen
- Dean Cooper
- Melvin Hunt
- Larry Smith
- Mike Wells

**Legend**
- **(DP)** Unsigned draft pick
- **(FA)** Free agent
- **(S)** Suspended
- Injured

Roster

=== Note ===
Bold = All-Star selection

== Regular season ==
=== Season standings ===
Midwest Division	W	L	PCT	GB	Home	Road	Div
y-San Antonio Spurs	60	22	.732	–	33–8	27–14	17–7
x-Dallas Mavericks	60	22	.732	–	33–8	27–14	18–6
x-Minnesota Timberwolves	51	31	.622	9	33–8	18–23	15–9
x-Utah Jazz	47	35	.573	13	29–12	18–23	15–9
e-Houston Rockets	43	39	.524	17	28–13	15–26	11–13
e-Memphis Grizzlies	28	54	.341	32	20–21	8–33	5–17
e-Denver Nuggets	17	65	.207	43	13–28	4–37	3–21

#	Western Conference				
#	Team	W	L	PCT	GB
1	z-San Antonio Spurs	60	22	.732	–
2	y-Sacramento Kings	59	23	.720	1
3	x-Dallas Mavericks	60	22	.732	–
4	x-Minnesota Timberwolves	51	31	.622	9
5	x-Los Angeles Lakers	50	32	.610	10
6	x-Portland Trail Blazers	50	32	.610	10
7	x-Utah Jazz	47	35	.573	13
8	x-Phoenix Suns	44	38	.537	16
9	e-Houston Rockets	43	39	.524	17
10	e-Seattle SuperSonics	40	42	.488	20
11	e-Golden State Warriors	38	44	.463	22
12	e-Memphis Grizzlies	28	54	.341	32
13	e-Los Angeles Clippers	27	55	.329	33
14	e-Denver Nuggets	17	65	.207	43

=== Game log ===
Game	Date	Opponent	Result	Rockets score	Opponents	Record	Streak	OT
1	October 30	@ Indiana	Loss	82	91	0-1	Lost 1	
2	November 1	@ Denver	Win	83	74	1-1	Won 1	
3	November 2	Toronto	Win	88	76	2-1	Won 2	
4	November 5	Seattle	Loss	97	104	2-2	Lost 1	
5	November 9	Golden State	Win	111	104	3-2	Won 1	
6	November 12	Portland	Win	86	83	4-2	Won 2	
7	November 15	@ Phoenix	Loss	87	88	4-3	Lost 1	
8	November 17	@ LA Lakers	Win	93	89	5-3	Won 1	
9	November 19	Cleveland	Win	97	80	6-3	Won 2	
10	November 21	@ Dallas	Loss	90	103	6-4	Lost 1	
11	November 22	Washington	Win	93	86	7-4	Won 1	
12	November 24	@ LA Clippers	Loss	89	90	7-5	Lost 1	
13	November 26	@ Portland	Loss	71	77	7-6	Lost 2	
14	November 27	@ Golden State	Win	91	84	8-6	Won 1	
15	November 29	@ Seattle	Win	83	72	9-6	Won 2	
16	December 1	@ Sacramento	Loss	84	103	9-7	Lost 1	
17	December 3	San Antonio	Win	89	75	10-7	Won 1	
18	December 6	@ New Orleans	Loss	96	98	10-8	Lost 1	OT
19	December 7	Philadelphia	Win	97	72	11-8	Won 1	
20	December 10	Sacramento	Win	103	96	12-8	Won 2	
21	December 13	@ Memphis	Loss	109	114	12-9	Lost 1	OT
22	December 14	LA Clippers	Loss	83	94	12-10	Lost 2	
23	December 16	@ Miami	Win	105	100	13-10	Won 1	OT
24	December 18	Indiana	Win	95	83	14-10	Won 2	
25	December 20	Atlanta	Win	101	82	15-10	Won 3	
26	December 21	@ Minnesota	Loss	86	98	15-11	Lost 1	
27	December 23	Utah	Loss	91	96	15-12	Lost 2	
28	December 27	New York	Loss	83	99	15-13	Lost 3	
29	December 29	New Orleans	Win	97	85	16-13	Won 1	
30	December 31	Milwaukee	Win	103	80	17-13	Won 2	
31	January 4	Golden State	Loss	84	86	17-14	Lost 1	
32	January 7	Minnesota	Win	94	86	18-14	Won 1	
33	January 8	@ Orlando	Win	91	81	19-14	Won 2	
34	January 10	@ Atlanta	Loss	75	84	19-15	Lost 1	
35	January 11	Denver	Win	87	85	20-15	Won 1	
36	January 13	Boston	Win	101	92	21-15	Won 2	
37	January 15	Phoenix	Win	102	96	22-15	Won 3	
38	January 17	LA Lakers	Win	108	104	23-15	Won 4	OT
39	January 20	@ San Antonio	Loss	82	87	23-16	Lost 1	
40	January 21	@ Dallas	Loss	86	107	23-17	Lost 2	
41	January 24	Detroit	Loss	74	98	23-18	Lost 3	
42	January 26	@ Chicago	Loss	98	100	23-19	Lost 4	
43	January 27	@ Memphis	Win	100	95	24-19	Won 1	
44	January 29	Dallas	Loss	81	104	24-20	Lost 1	
45	January 31	Minnesota	Win	121	101	25-20	Won 1	
46	February 2	Sacramento	Win	105	89	26-20	Won 2	
47	February 4	@ Minnesota	Loss	89	103	26-21	Lost 1	
48	February 5	@ Cleveland	Loss	102	105	26-22	Lost 2	
49	February 11	Utah	Loss	101	103	26-23	Lost 3	OT
50	February 12	@ Utah	Win	106	76	27-23	Won 1	
51	February 14	Miami	Loss	82	94	27-24	Lost 1	
52	February 18	@ LA Lakers	Loss	99	106	27-25	Lost 2	2OT
53	February 19	@ Phoenix	Win	107	89	28-25	Won 1	
54	February 21	Dallas	Loss	85	100	28-26	Lost 1	
55	February 22	Memphis	Win	93	82	29-26	Won 1	
56	February 24	@ Boston	Win	101	95	30-26	Won 2	OT
57	February 25	@ New York	Loss	95	102	30-27	Lost 1	
58	February 27	@ Washington	Loss	98	100	30-28	Lost 2	OT
59	March 2	San Antonio	Loss	88	97	30-29	Lost 3	
60	March 4	@ Detroit	Loss	83	96	30-30	Lost 4	
61	March 5	@ Toronto	Win	97	95	31-30	Won 1	
62	March 8	New Jersey	Win	83	71	32-30	Won 2	
63	March 12	LA Clippers	Win	118	114	33-30	Won 3	OT
64	March 14	Chicago	Win	121	91	34-30	Won 4	
65	March 16	Phoenix	Win	85	75	35-30	Won 5	
66	March 18	@ Seattle	Loss	94	100	35-31	Lost 1	
67	March 19	@ Portland	Loss	83	94	35-32	Lost 2	
68	March 21	@ Golden State	Win	117	107	36-32	Won 1	
69	March 23	@ Sacramento	Loss	108	109	36-33	Lost 1	
70	March 24	@ LA Clippers	Win	108	90	37-33	Won 1	
71	March 26	LA Lakers	Loss	93	96	37-34	Lost 1	
72	March 27	@ San Antonio	Loss	85	98	37-35	Lost 2	
73	March 29	Denver	Win	102	89	38-35	Won 1	
74	March 31	@ New Jersey	Loss	86	110	38-36	Lost 1	
75	April 2	@ Milwaukee	Loss	99	106	38-37	Lost 2	
76	April 4	@ Philadelphia	Win	88	79	39-37	Won 1	
77	April 6	Orlando	Win	114	93	40-37	Won 2	
78	April 8	Portland	Loss	66	81	40-38	Lost 1	
79	April 9	@ Utah	Loss	73	94	40-39	Lost 2	
80	April 12	Seattle	Win	101	86	41-39	Won 1	
81	April 15	Memphis	Win	97	86	42-39	Won 2	
82	April 16	@ Denver	Win	89	84	43-39	Won 3	

== Player statistics ==
Legend
GP	Games played	GS	Games started	MPG	Minutes per game
FG%	Field-goal percentage	3P%	3-point field-goal percentage	FT%	Free-throw percentage
RPG	Rebounds per game	APG	Assists per game	SPG	Steals per game
BPG	Blocks per game	PPG	Points per game

=== Regular season ===
Player	GP	GS	MPG	FG%	3FG%	FT%	RPG	APG	SPG	BPG	PPG
Kelvin Cato	73	5	17.1	.520	.000	.532	5.9	.3	.5	1.2	4.5
Jason Collier	13	3	8.0	.472		1.000	2.2	.1	.2	.1	2.8
Steve Francis	81	81	41.0	.435	.354	.800	6.2	6.2	1.7	.5	21.0
Eddie Griffin	77	66	24.5	.400	.333	.617	6.0	1.1	.7	1.4	8.6
Juaquin Hawkins	58	10	11.8	.385	.417	.500	1.3	.8	.5	.1	2.3
Tito Maddox	9	0	3.9	.250	.000	.625	.8	.6	.3	.1	1.2
Yao Ming	82	72	29.0	.498	.500	.811	8.2	1.7	.4	1.8	13.5
Cuttino Mobley	73	73	41.7	.434	.352	.858	4.2	2.8	1.3	.5	17.5
Terence Morris	49	0	12.9	.466	.219	.786	2.6	.5	.2	.3	3.7
Boštjan Nachbar	14	1	5.5	.355	.200	.500	.8	.2	.1	.1	2.1
Moochie Norris	82	3	16.8	.406	.244	.684	1.9	2.4	.7	.0	4.4
James Posey^{†}	58	47	28.4	.439	.326	.826	4.8	1.8	1.3	.2	9.3
Glen Rice	62	26	24.7	.429	.398	.759	2.5	1.0	.4	.1	9.0
Maurice Taylor	67	9	20.6	.432	.000	.725	3.6	1.0	.3	.3	8.4
Kenny Thomas^{†}	20	14	29.3	.432		.733	6.9	2.0	.8	.3	9.9

Player statistics citation:

== Awards and records ==
=== Awards ===
- Yao Ming, NBA All-Rookie Team 1st Team

== Transactions ==
=== Free agents ===
==== Additions ====
Player	Signed	Former team

==== Subtractions ====
Player	Left	New team

== See also ==
- 2002–03 NBA season
