= 2002–03 Seattle SuperSonics season =

NBA professional basketball team season

- Head coach: Nate McMillan
- General manager: Rick Sund
- Owners: Howard Schultz
- Arena: KeyArena

Results
- Record: 40–42 (.488)
- Place: Division: 5th (Pacific); Conference: 10th (Western)
- Playoff finish: Did not qualify
- Stats at Basketball Reference

Local media
- Television: KING-TV; KONG; Fox Sports Net Northwest
- Radio: KJR

The 2002–03 Seattle SuperSonics season was the 36th season for the Seattle SuperSonics in the National Basketball Association.

== Season summary ==
=== Off-season ===
During the off-season, the SuperSonics acquired Kenny Anderson and Vitaly Potapenko from the Boston Celtics, and signed free agent and rookie power forward Reggie Evans.

=== Regular season ===
The SuperSonics got off to a solid start by winning eight of their first ten games of the regular season, but then lost six of their next seven games, then posted two six-game losing streaks in January and February, holding a 21–27 record at the All-Star break. At mid-season, before the trading deadline, the team traded All-Star guard Gary Payton, and Desmond Mason to the Milwaukee Bucks in exchange for All-Star guard Ray Allen, and Kevin Ollie; before the trade, Payton averaged 20.8 points, 8.8 assists and 1.8 steals per game in 52 games. The team also traded Anderson to the New Orleans Hornets in exchange for Elden Campbell. Despite the addition of Allen, the SuperSonics finished in fifth place in the Pacific Division with a 40–42 record, and failed to qualify for the NBA playoffs.

Allen averaged 24.5 points, 5.6 rebounds, 5.9 assists and 1.6 steals per game in 29 games after the trade, while Rashard Lewis averaged 18.1 points, 6.5 rebounds and 1.3 steals per game, and Brent Barry provided the team with 10.3 points, 5.1 assists and 1.5 steals per game, and also led them with 118 three-point field goals. In addition, second-year forward Vladimir Radmanović contributed 10.1 points and 4.5 rebounds per game, and contributed 104 three-point field goals, while second-year center Predrag Drobnjak provided with 9.4 points and 3.9 rebounds per game, and Ollie contributed 8.0 points and 3.8 assists per game in 29 games. Meanwhile, Jerome James averaged 5.2 points, 4.5 rebounds and 1.6 blocks per game, Potapenko contributed 4.0 points and 3.4 rebounds per game, but only played just 26 games due to injury, and Evans provided with 3.2 points and 6.6 rebounds per game.

During the NBA All-Star weekend at the Philips Arena in Atlanta, Georgia, and before the mid-season trade, Payton was selected for the 2003 NBA All-Star Game, as a member of the Western Conference All-Star team; it was his final All-Star appearance. Meanwhile, Mason participated in the NBA Slam Dunk Contest for the third consecutive year, and Barry participated in the NBA Three-Point Shootout, and also finished tied in 21st place in Most Improved Player voting.

The SuperSonics finished 20th in the NBA in home-game attendance, with an attendance of 637,194 at the KeyArena at Seattle Center during the regular season.

=== Aftermath ===
Following the season, Drobnjak signed as a free agent with the Los Angeles Clippers, while Ollie signed with the Cleveland Cavaliers, and Campbell signed with the Detroit Pistons.

== Offseason ==
=== Draft picks ===
Round	Pick	Player	Position	Nationality	College/club team
2	48	Peter Fehse	PF	Germany	SV Halle

== Roster ==
2002–03 Seattle SuperSonics roster
Players

Pos.	No.	Player	Height	Weight	DOB	From
G	34	Ray Allen	6 ft 5 in (1.96 m)	205 lb (93 kg)		Connecticut
G/F	31	Brent Barry	6 ft 6 in (1.98 m)	185 lb (84 kg)		Oregon State
F/C	52	Calvin Booth	6 ft 11 in (2.11 m)	230 lb (104 kg)		Penn State
F/C	41	Elden Campbell (injured)	6 ft 11 in (2.11 m)	215 lb (98 kg)		Clemson
F/C	14	Predrag Drobnjak	6 ft 11 in (2.11 m)	270 lb (122 kg)		FR Yugoslavia
F	30	Reggie Evans	6 ft 8 in (2.03 m)	245 lb (111 kg)		Iowa
G	40	Joseph Forte	6 ft 4 in (1.93 m)	194 lb (88 kg)		North Carolina
C	33	Jerome James	7 ft 0 in (2.13 m)	300 lb (136 kg)		Florida A&M
F	7	Rashard Lewis	6 ft 10 in (2.08 m)	235 lb (107 kg)		Alief Elsik HS (TX)
G	22	Ronald Murray	6 ft 3 in (1.91 m)	200 lb (91 kg)		Shaw
G	8	Kevin Ollie	6 ft 4 in (1.93 m)	195 lb (88 kg)		Connecticut
C	9	Vitaly Potapenko	6 ft 10 in (2.08 m)	280 lb (127 kg)		Wright State
F	77	Vladimir Radmanović	6 ft 10 in (2.08 m)	227 lb (103 kg)		FR Yugoslavia
F	45	Ansu Sesay (injured)	6 ft 9 in (2.06 m)	225 lb (102 kg)		Mississippi

Coaches
Head coach
- Nate McMillan
Assistant(s)
- Dwane Casey
- Dwight Daub
- Dean Demopoulos
- Bob Weiss

Legend
- (DP) Unsigned draft pick
- (FA) Free agent
- (S) Suspended
- Injured

Roster

== Regular season ==
=== Season standings ===
Pacific Division	W	L	PCT	GB	Home	Road	Div
y-Sacramento Kings	59	23	.720	–	35–6	24–17	17–7
x-Los Angeles Lakers	50	32	.610	9	31–10	19–22	15–9
x-Portland Trail Blazers	50	32	.610	9	27–14	23–18	15–9
x-Phoenix Suns	44	38	.537	15	30–11	14–27	12–12
e-Seattle SuperSonics	40	42	.488	19	25–16	15–26	11–13
e-Golden State Warriors	38	44	.463	21	24–17	14–27	8–16
e-Los Angeles Clippers	27	55	.329	32	16–25	11–30	6–18

#	Western Conference				
#	Team	W	L	PCT	GB
1	z-San Antonio Spurs	60	22	.732	–
2	y-Sacramento Kings	59	23	.720	1
3	x-Dallas Mavericks	60	22	.732	–
4	x-Minnesota Timberwolves	51	31	.622	9
5	x-Los Angeles Lakers	50	32	.610	10
6	x-Portland Trail Blazers	50	32	.610	10
7	x-Utah Jazz	47	35	.573	13
8	x-Phoenix Suns	44	38	.537	16
9	e-Houston Rockets	43	39	.524	17
10	e-Seattle SuperSonics	40	42	.488	20
11	e-Golden State Warriors	38	44	.463	22
12	e-Memphis Grizzlies	28	54	.341	32
13	e-Los Angeles Clippers	27	55	.329	33
14	e-Denver Nuggets	17	65	.207	43

z - clinched division title
y - clinched division title
x - clinched playoff spot

== Player statistics ==
Legend
GP	Games played	GS	Games started	MPG	Minutes per game
FG%	Field-goal percentage	3P%	3-point field-goal percentage	FT%	Free-throw percentage
RPG	Rebounds per game	APG	Assists per game	SPG	Steals per game
BPG	Blocks per game	PPG	Points per game

Player	GP	GS	MPG	FG%	3P%	FT%	RPG	APG	SPG	BPG	PPG
Ray Allen	29	29	41.3	.441	.351	.920	5.6	5.9	1.6	0.1	24.5
Gary Payton	52	52	40.8	.448	.298	.692	4.8	8.8	1.8	0.2	20.8
Rashard Lewis	77	77	39.5	.452	.346	.820	6.5	1.7	1.3	0.5	18.1
Desmond Mason	52	15	34.8	.436	.291	.740	6.4	1.8	0.9	0.4	14.1
Brent Barry	75	68	33.1	.458	.403	.795	4.0	5.1	1.5	0.2	10.3
Kevin Ollie	29	1	26.6	.441	1.000	.759	2.9	3.8	1.1	0.0	8.0
Vladimir Radmanović	72	16	26.5	.410	.355	.706	4.5	1.3	0.9	0.3	10.1
Predrag Drobnjak	82	69	24.2	.412	.353	.791	3.9	1.0	0.6	0.5	9.4
Reggie Evans	67	60	20.4	.471		.519	6.6	0.5	0.6	0.2	3.2
Kenny Anderson	38	1	18.1	.440	.000	.829	2.3	3.2	1.1	0.0	6.1
Vitaly Potapenko	26	2	15.5	.441		.759	3.4	0.2	0.3	0.3	4.0
Jerome James	51	16	15.0	.478		.587	4.2	0.5	0.2	1.6	5.4
Elden Campbell	15	0	12.3	.333		.762	2.6	0.6	0.6	0.5	3.2
Calvin Booth	47	0	12.2	.437	.000	.723	2.3	0.3	0.2	0.7	2.9
Ronald Murray	2	0	10.0	.400	.000		1.5	1.0	0.0	0.0	2.0
Ansu Sesay	45	4	10.0	.383		.571	1.6	0.5	0.3	0.1	2.1
Joseph Forte	17	0	5.1	.286	.000	.667	0.6	0.6	0.2	0.0	1.4

Player statistics citation:

== Awards and records ==
- Ray Allen, Player of the Week (Mar. 2)
- Ray Allen, Three-Point Field Goal Leader
- Rashard Lewis, Player of the Week (Nov. 17)

== See also ==
- 2002-03 NBA season
