= Greg Ostertag =

American basketball player (born 1973)

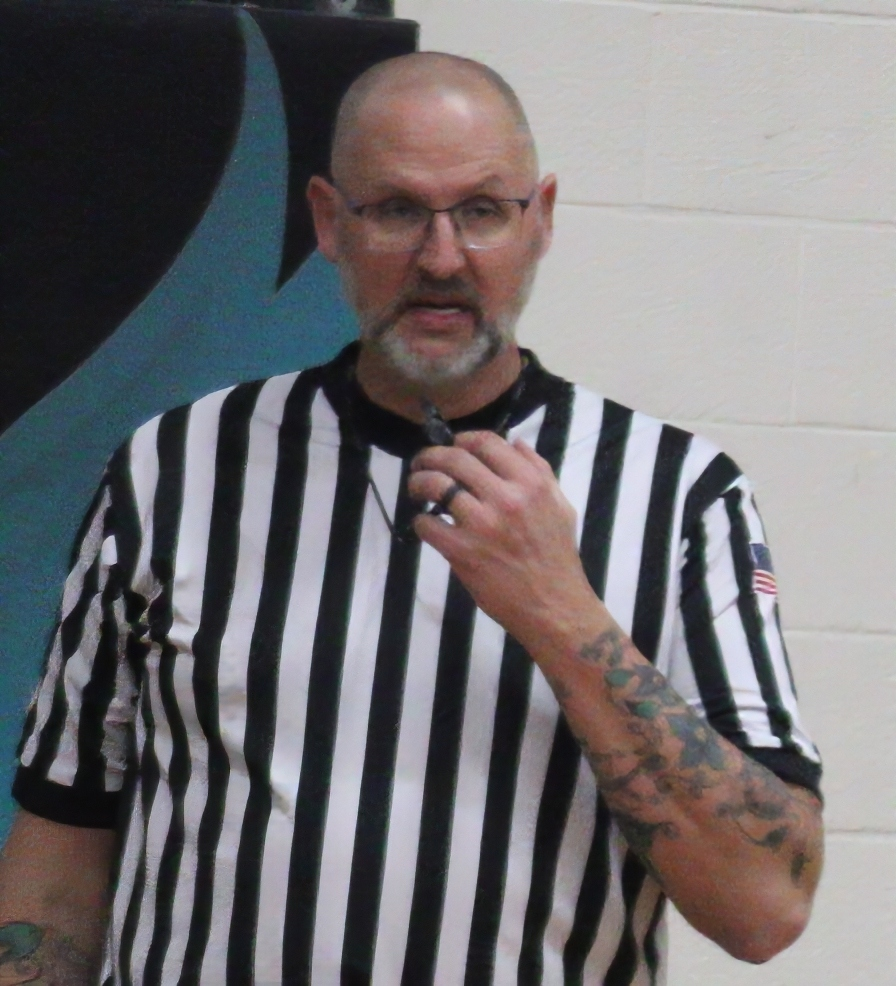
- Ostertag in 2022

Personal information
- Born: March 6, 1973 (age 53) Dallas, Texas, U.S.
- Listed height: 7 ft 2 in (2.18 m)
- Listed weight: 280 lb (127 kg)

Career information
- High school: Duncanville (Duncanville, Texas)
- College: Kansas (1991–1995)
- NBA draft: 1995: 1st round, 28th overall pick
- Drafted by: Utah Jazz
- Playing career: 1995–2006, 2011–2012
- Position: Center
- Number: 00, 39

Career history
- 1995–2004: Utah Jazz
- 2004–2005: Sacramento Kings
- 2005–2006: Utah Jazz
- 2011–2012: Texas Legends

Career statistics
- Points: 3,512 (4.6 ppg)
- Rebounds: 4,145 (5.5 rpg)
- Blocks: 1,293 (1.7 bpg)
- Stats at NBA.com
- Stats at Basketball Reference

Gregory Donovan Ostertag (born March 6, 1973) is an American politician and former professional basketball player. A center, he spent most of his career with the Utah Jazz of the National Basketball Association (NBA). He played college basketball for the Kansas Jayhawks.

In 2026, Ostertag was elected as mayor of Mount Vernon, Texas.

== High school career ==
Ostertag starred at Duncanville High School in Duncanville, Texas, a suburb of Dallas. He averaged 22.5 points and 13 rebounds per game during his senior season, and capped the year by leading the Panthers to the 1991 state championship, the first-ever for the school's boys basketball team.

== College career ==
After his high school career, Ostertag joined the basketball team at the University of Kansas. Standing 7 ft 2 in (2.18 m) and weighing 280 lb (130 kg), he helped the Jayhawks reach the NCAA Final Four in 1993. Statistically, his best season was his junior year (1993–94), when he averaged 10.3 points and 8.8 rebounds per game. He set a school record by blocking 97 shots that year. He graduated in 1995 with career totals of 968 points and 770 rebounds, along with 258 blocked shots — the highest total in the history of Kansas and the Big 8 Conference at that time (since surpassed by Jeff Withey).

== Professional career ==
The Utah Jazz selected Ostertag with the 28th pick in the first round of the 1995 NBA draft. Ostertag saw limited action in his rookie year, but emerged as Utah's starting center during his second season. The Jazz made back-to-back appearances in the NBA Finals in 1997 and 1998, with Ostertag providing strong defense in the playoffs against the likes of Hakeem Olajuwon, David Robinson, Tim Duncan, and Shaquille O'Neal.

The Jazz signed Ostertag to a long-term contract extension worth $39 million over six years. He led the NBA in blocked shot percentage twice (in 2000 and 2002) and was particularly good at gaining possession of the ball after blocking a shot. Ostertag's contract expired in 2004, making him a free agent in the league. After nine seasons in Utah, he joined the Sacramento Kings.

Ostertag played one year in Sacramento, before being traded twice in the same off-season, first to the Memphis Grizzlies, and later back to Utah in a "mega-trade" that involved five teams and 13 players — then the largest trade in NBA history. Ostertag played one final season (2005–06) with the Jazz. He played his final game on April 19, 2006, a home contest against the Golden State Warriors. Having previously announced his retirement, and that game being the last of the season, Ostertag received a standing ovation from Jazz fans. He played 3:36 in the game, all in the first quarter. He blocked a shot and grabbed a rebound, and missed two free throws. The Jazz won the game, giving the team a final record of 41–41 for the year, ensuring that Ostertag retired having never played for a losing team for his entire NBA career.

In December 2011, Ostertag returned to professional basketball. He signed with the Texas Legends of the NBA Development League. After playing 10 games with the Legends, however, he ended his comeback due to knee injury.

== Personal life ==
In 2002, Ostertag donated a kidney to save the life of his sister Amy (Hall) Ostertag, who was dying of complications from type 1 diabetes; upon his return he became the first player in NBA history to play after donating an organ. Ostertag is the co-founder of The Ostertag Group, an umbrella company that owns and operates Tag's Hometown Bar & Grill and Ostertag Construction. Ostertag is also a licensed realtor with Century 21 Harvey Properties. He also owns a sports bar in Mount Vernon, Texas. Ostertag also occasionally is a substitute teacher.

== Political career ==
In May 2026, Ostertag was elected as mayor of Mount Vernon, Texas. He ran on a nonpartisan platform and has aimed to revitalize the town especially downtown. It is a volunteer position. He is likely one of the tallest elected officials in the World.

== Career statistics ==
Legend
GP	Games played	GS	Games started	MPG	Minutes per game
FG%	Field goal percentage	3P%	3-point field goal percentage	FT%	Free throw percentage
RPG	Rebounds per game	APG	Assists per game	SPG	Steals per game
BPG	Blocks per game	PPG	Points per game	**Bold**	Career high
*	Led the league

=== NBA ===
==== Regular season ====
Year	Team	GP	GS	MPG	FG%	3P%	FT%	RPG	APG	SPG	BPG	PPG
1995–96	Utah	57	10	11.6	.473	–	.667	3.1	.1	.1	1.1	3.6
1996–97	Utah	77	70	23.6	.515	.000	.**678**	7.3	.4	.3	2.0	**7.3**
1997–98	Utah	63	23	20.4	.481	–	.479	5.9	.4	**.4**	2.1	4.7
1998–99	Utah	48	48	**27.9**	.476	–	.620	7.3	.5	.2	**2.7**	5.7
1999–00	Utah	**81**	3	19.8	.464	.000	.636	6.0	.2	.2	2.1	4.5
2000–01	Utah	**81**	3	18.4	.495	**.500**	.556	5.1	.3	.3	1.8	4.5
2001–02	Utah	74	14	15.0	.453	–	.485	4.2	.7	.2	1.5	3.3
2002–03	Utah	**81**	**74**	23.8	**.518**	–	.510	6.2	.7	.2	1.8	5.4
2003–04	Utah	78	51	27.6	.476	.000	.579	**7.4**	**1.6**	**.4**	1.8	6.8
2004–05	Sacramento	56	3	9.9	.440	.000	.342	3.0	.7	.1	.7	1.6
2005–06	Utah	60	22	13.5	.492	–	.500	3.8	1.0	.1	1.1	2.4
Career		756	321	19.5	.486	.100	.569	5.5	.6	.3	1.7	4.6

==== Playoffs ====
Year	Team	GP	GS	MPG	FG%	3P%	FT%	RPG	APG	SPG	BPG	PPG
1996	Utah	15	0	14.1	.444	–	.619	3.3	.1	.1	1.4	3.5
1997	Utah	**20***	**20***	20.3	.410	–	**.743**	6.9	.3	.5	**2.4**	4.7
1998	Utah	19	1	17.7	.565	–	.480	4.3	.3	.4	1.9	3.4
1999	Utah	11	11	23.7	.371	–	.643	5.9	.5	.2	2.2	4.0
2000	Utah	8	0	21.5	.526	–	.455	5.6	.3	.3	2.1	3.8
2001	Utah	5	0	12.8	.364	–	.000	3.6	.2	.0	.4	1.6
2002	Utah	4	0	21.8	.619	–	.100	8.5	.5	.5	1.8	6.8
2003	Utah	5	5	**30.2**	.444	–	.737	**8.6**	**1.6**	**.6**	1.8	**9.2**
2005	Sacramento	2	0	13.0	**1.000**	–	–	4.5	.0	.5	1.0	3.0
Career		89	37	19.9	.465	–	.573	5.4	.3	.3	1.9	4.2

=== NBA D-League ===
==== Regular season ====
Year	Team	GP	GS	MPG	FG%	3P%	FT%	RPG	APG	SPG	BPG	PPG
2011–12	Texas	10	1	13.4	.545	–	.500	5.0	.6	.1	.5	4.3

=== College ===
*	Led Big 8 Conference

Year	Team	GP	GS	MPG	FG%	3P%	FT%	RPG	APG	SPG	BPG	PPG
1991–92	Kansas	32	1	9.7	.545	.000	**.653**	3.5	.2	.2	1.1	4.8
1992–93	Kansas	29		13.4	.517	–	.600	4.1	**.4**	.3	1.2	5.3
1993–94	Kansas	**35***	**34**	**21.1**	.533	.000	.631	**8.8**	.3	**.4**	2.8*	**10.3**
1994–95	Kansas	31	28	19.5	**.596**	–	.553	7.5	**.4**	**.4**	**2.9***	9.6
Career		127	64	16.1	.550	.000	.604	6.1	.3	.3	2.0	7.6

== Electoral history ==
2026 Mount Vernon, Texas mayoral election
Candidate	Votes	%
Greg Ostertag	245	53.85%
Brad Hyman (incumbent)	210	46.15%
Total votes	455	100.00%
Majority	35	7.69%

== See also ==
- List of National Basketball Association career playoff blocks leaders
- List of National Basketball Association players with 10 or more blocks in a game
