= Se Va Conmigo =

2010 single by Carlos Arroyo

Single by Carlos Arroyo featuring Yomo and or Ivy Queen

from the album Carlos Arroyo
- Released: July 31, 2010
- Recorded: 2010–2011 in South Florida
- Genre: Reggaetón
- Length: 3:27
- Label: Arroyo Hit Music
- Songwriter(s): Carlos Arroyo, Christopher Cabrera, Martha Pesante, Jose Torres
- Producer(s): Luny Tunes

Carlos Arroyo singles chronology
"Oculto Secreto" (2009)	"Se Va Conmigo" (2010)	"Bailemos En La Luna" (2011)

"Se Va Conmigo" is a song performed by Puerto Rican profession basketball player and recording artist Carlos Arroyo. The song features guest vocals from reggaetón singer Yomo. The official remix features Ivy Queen. The song is Arroyo's second single release for his independent record label Arroyo Hit Music.

The song officially impacted Latin rhythmic radio on August 28, 2010, debuting at number forty-five on the Billboard Latin Digital Songs chart, number twenty-six on the Billboard Latin Rhythm Songs chart and number thirteen on the Billboard Latin Rhythm Digital Songs chart.

== Background ==
Prior to launching a musical career, Arroyo played in the National Basketball Association with the Toronto Raptors, Denver Nuggets, Utah Jazz, Detroit Pistons, Orlando Magic, Miami Heat, and Boston Celtics. In the 2008–2009 season, he played for Maccabi Tel Aviv in the Israeli Basketball Super League, winning the league's championship and being named the Final's Most Valuable Player. He has also played professionally in Puerto Rico and Spain. Arroyo was a member of the Puerto Rican national basketball team that defeated the United States at the 2004 Olympic Basketball Tournament. He also represented Puerto Rico at the 2006 FIBA World Championship in Japan.

Interested with the genre of reggaetón, Arroyo launched his own studio and independent record label, entitled Arroyo Hit Music in 2009. The first single release for the label was entitled "Oculto Secreto".

== Reception ==
Dan Devine for Yahoo! Sports described the song as not being his "brand of vodka", however expressed that "he [Arroyo] definitely sounds less heinous 'neath auto-tons of AutoTune than DeJuan Blair. Matt Flores agreed that there was an overuse of AutoTune within the song, claiming "if Arroyo can abuse opposing teams like he abused auto-tune in this song, the Heat are destined for big things." Paul Torres, for the Miami New Times, however had a different output on the song. Torres described the song as "very respectable" and "radio-friendly". He continued by stating that Arroyo was "laying catchy, auto-tune laden vocals over a fusion of classic reggaeton rhythms with club-ready electronic melodies".

== Charts ==
Chart (2010)	Peak
US Latin Digital Songs (Billboard)	45
US Latin Rhythm Songs (Billboard)	26
US Latin Rhythm Digital Songs (Billboard)	13
