= 1999 NBA playoffs =

Postseason tournament

Tournament details
- Dates: May 8–June 25, 1999
- Season: 1998–99
- Teams: 16

Final positions
- Champions: San Antonio Spurs (1st title)
- Runners-up: New York Knicks
- Semifinalists: Indiana Pacers; Portland Trail Blazers

Tournament statistics
- Scoring leader(s): Latrell Sprewell (Knicks) (20.4 PPG)

Awards
- MVP: Tim Duncan (Spurs)

The 1999 NBA playoffs was the postseason tournament of the National Basketball Association’s 1998-99 season. The tournament concluded with the Western Conference champion San Antonio Spurs defeating the Eastern Conference champion New York Knicks 4 games to 1. Tim Duncan was named NBA Finals MVP.

The 1999 Playoffs are memorable in part because a #8 seed (the Knicks) made it to the Finals for the first time in history, following a lockout–shortened 50–game season. It was one of only two NBA Finals to include a #8 seed, the other occurring in 2023.

== Overview ==
The Philadelphia 76ers and Milwaukee Bucks returned to the playoffs for the first time since 1991 (coincidentally they faced each other in the opening round that year), and it was also the 76ers’ first appearance since drafting Allen Iverson with the #1 overall pick in 1996. Iverson later led the Sixers to the 2001 NBA Finals.

After spending their first thirteen seasons in Sacramento in mediocrity, with no winning record and two playoff appearances in 1986 and 1996, the Kings franchise made the first of eight consecutive playoff appearances, which included a trip to the Western Conference Finals in 2002. This was their first winning record since 1982–83, which they were based in Kansas City.

The Bulls, despite being defending champions, missed the playoffs for the first time since 1984 (mostly due to the second retirement of Michael Jordan and the departures of Scottie Pippen and Dennis Rodman). They also became the first defending champion since the 1969–70 Boston Celtics to miss the playoffs.

With their first round sweep of the Phoenix Suns, the Portland Trail Blazers won a playoff series for the first time since 1992, when they last made the NBA Finals.

Game 4 of the Lakers–Rockets series was the final postseason appearance of Charles Barkley’s Hall of Fame career. It was also the final playoff game ever held at the Compaq Center.

Game 5 of the Hawks–Pistons series is the last NBA playoff game played in a college basketball-specific arena (Georgia Tech's then-named Alexander Memorial Coliseum), and among the final NBA games played in a college basketball-specific arena. Many teams formerly played playoff games on college campuses, especially in the NBA's early days, but the increasing professionalization and ownership of arena times made the practice obsolete.

Game 5 of the Heat–Knicks series was extremely notable for two reasons

- Allan Houston's series winning shot to win the game and the series. By doing so, the Knicks became only the second eighth seeded team (after the 1994 Denver Nuggets) to knock off a top seed in the playoffs. The Knicks were eventually joined by the 2007 Golden State Warriors, the 2011 Memphis Grizzlies, the 2012 Philadelphia 76ers, and the 2023 Miami Heat as one of only six eighth seeded teams to eliminate a top seeded team in the playoffs.
- In addition, Game 5 was the last playoff game ever played at Miami Arena. The Heat continued to host regular season games there for part of the 1999–2000 season before moving to the American Airlines Arena in January 2000.

Game 4 of the Spurs–Lakers series was the last regulation NBA game ever played in the Great Western Forum. The Lakers played a handful of preseason games leading up to the 1999–2000 season before Staples Center became the new home of the team for that season.

With their conference semifinals sweep of the Atlanta Hawks, the New York Knicks made the conference finals for the first time since 1994. The 1999 Knicks and the 2023 Miami Heat are the only eighth seeded teams (as of 2023) to advance past the conference semifinals. After losing to the Knicks, the Hawks did not return to the playoffs until 2008.

This was the last NBA postseason to feature back–to–backs in the conference semifinals until 2012.

Game 2 of the Spurs–Trail Blazers series was notable for the San Antonio Spurs overcoming an eighteen-point deficit to win the game. The final shot, taken by Sean Elliott, completed what is called the “Memorial Day Miracle.”

With their Western Conference Finals sweep of the Portland Trail Blazers, the San Antonio Spurs made the NBA Finals for the first time in franchise history.

Game 5 of the Knicks–Pacers series was the last meaningful NBA game ever played at Market Square Arena.

With their Game 6 win over the Indiana Pacers, the New York Knicks became the first eighth seeded team to make it to the NBA Finals.

With their Game 2 win over the New York Knicks, the San Antonio Spurs won their 12th straight playoff game. The streak included back to back sweeps of the Lakers and Trail Blazers (who would meet in next year's Western Conference Finals). This playoff winning streak has since been beaten by the Cleveland Cavaliers and the Golden State Warriors in 2017, although the Cavs started their streak by winning the final three games of the 2016 NBA playoffs.

With their Game 5 win against the New York Knicks at Madison Square Garden, the San Antonio Spurs became the first former ABA team to win an NBA Championship. The Spurs finished with a 15–2 postseason record, which tied that of the 1991 Chicago Bulls, for the best postseason record at the time. Subsequently, it has been bettered by the 15–1 playoff record of the 2001 Los Angeles Lakers, and the 16–1 playoff record by the 2017 Golden State Warriors. Interestingly, both of the Spurs losses came against #8 seeded teams. Also, although the Spurs had home-court advantage throughout the playoffs, they played more road games (nine) than home games (eight).

For the first time since 1991, no series went to seven games. As of 2026, this remains the most recent NBA postseason not to feature a Game 7.

This is the last time an 8 seed went to the Eastern Conference finals and was the only time one made it to the NBA Finals until 2023, when the Miami Heat made the NBA Finals after beating the Boston Celtics in 7 games in the Eastern Conference finals, the New York Knicks in 6 games in the Eastern Conference semifinals, and the Milwaukee Bucks in 5 games in the first round.

== Bracket ==
First Round | Conference Semifinals
E1 | Miami* | 2
E8 | New York | 3
E8 | New York | 4
E4 | Atlanta | 0
E4 | Atlanta | 3
E5 | Detroit | 2
Eastern Conference
E3 | Orlando | 1
E6 | Philadelphia | 3
E6 | Philadelphia | 0
E2 | Indiana* | 4
E2 | Indiana* | 3
E7 | Milwaukee | 0
W1 | San Antonio* | 3
W8 | Minnesota | 1
W1 | San Antonio* | 4
W4 | LA Lakers | 0
W4 | LA Lakers | 3
W5 | Houston | 1
Western Conference
W3 | Utah | 3
W6 | Sacramento | 2
W3 | Utah | 2
W2 | Portland* | 4
W2 | Portland* | 3
W7 | Phoenix | 0

Conference Finals
E8 | New York | 4
E2 | Indiana* | 2
W1 | San Antonio* | 4
W2 | Portland* | 0

NBA Finals
E8 | New York | 1
W1 | San Antonio* | 4

- * Division winner
- Bold Series winner
- Italic Team with home-court advantage

== First round ==
All times are in Eastern Daylight Time. (UTC−04:00) If the venue is located in a different time zone, the local time is also given.

=== Eastern Conference first round ===
==== (1) Miami Heat vs. (8) New York Knicks ====
NBC

May 8
12:30 PM

Boxscore

New York Knicks 95, Miami Heat 75
Scoring by quarter: 28–18, 20–13, 22–23, 25–21
| Pts: Houston, Sprewell 22 each Rebs: Patrick Ewing 15; Asts: Charlie Ward 6 | Pts: Alonzo Mourning 27; Rebs: Dan Majerle 10; Asts: Tim Hardaway 3 |
New York leads series, 1–0

Miami Arena, Miami, Florida
Attendance: 15,036
Referees: Joe DeRosa, Ron Garretson, Steve Javie

TBS

May 10
7:00 PM

Boxscore

New York Knicks 73, Miami Heat 83
Scoring by quarter: 15–23, 20–23, 20–17, 18–20
| Pts: Patrick Ewing 16; Rebs: Patrick Ewing 15; Asts: Charlie Ward 5 | Pts: Alonzo Mourning 26; Rebs: Majerle, Mourning 8 each Asts: Tim Hardaway 11 |
Series tied, 1–1

Miami Arena, Miami, Florida
Attendance: 15,200
Referees: Dan Crawford, Nolan Fine, Bernie Fryer

TNT

May 12
8:00 PM

Boxscore

Miami Heat 73, New York Knicks 97
Scoring by quarter: 25–20, 12–25, 11–28, 25–24
| Pts: Alonzo Mourning 18; Rebs: P. J. Brown 8 Asts: Tim Hardaway 5 | Pts: Latrell Sprewell 20; Rebs: Marcus Camby 9 Asts: Charlie Ward 4 |
New York leads series, 2–1

Madison Square Garden, New York City, New York
Attendance: 19,763
Referees: Joe Forte, David Jones, Mike Mathis

TNT

May 14
8:00 PM

Boxscore

Miami Heat 87, New York Knicks 72
Scoring by quarter: 25–24, 15–20, 18–18, 29–10
| Pts: Mourning, Porter 16 each Rebs: Alonzo Mourning 13; Asts: Terry Porter 7 | Pts: Houston, Ward 12 each Rebs: Larry Johnson 12; Asts: Charlie Ward 4 |
Series tied, 2–2

Madison Square Garden, New York City, New York
Attendance: 19,763
Referees: Joe Crawford, Bob Delaney, Tom Washington

NBC

May 16
12:30 PM

Boxscore

New York Knicks 78, Miami Heat 77
Scoring by quarter: 23–23, 14–18, 23–19, 18–17
| Pts: Patrick Ewing 22; Rebs: Patrick Ewing 11; Asts: three players 3 each | Pts: Alonzo Mourning 21; Rebs: P. J. Brown 12; Asts: Tim Hardaway 8 |
New York wins series, 3–2

Miami Arena, Miami, Florida
Attendance: 14,985
Referees: Jim Clark, Hugh Evans, Eddie F. Rush

- Allan Houston hit the series-winning shot with 0.8 seconds left to complete the Knicks first-round upset against the Heat. By winning the decisive Game 5, the Knicks became the first team in NBA history to defeat a top 2 seed in the First Round in consecutive seasons (coincidentally, both times were against the Heat). Conversely, the Heat became the first team in NBA history not to get past the First Round as a top 2 seed in consecutive seasons while also becoming the second #1 seed to lose a playoff series against a #8 seed in the First Round.
- Game 5 was the final playoff game played at Miami Arena.

Regular-season series
Tied 2–2 in the regular-season series

February 7, 1999

Recap

Miami Heat 83, New York Knicks 79

Madison Square Garden, New York City

March 2, 1999

Recap

New York Knicks 84, Miami Heat 85 (OT)

Miami Arena, Miami

April 25, 1999

Recap

New York Knicks 82, Miami Heat 80

Miami Arena, Miami

May 5, 1999

Recap

Miami Heat 88, New York Knicks 101

Madison Square Garden, New York City

This was the third playoff meeting between these two teams, with each team winning one series apiece.

Previous playoff series
Tied 1–1 in all-time playoff series

1997

Miami Heat 4, New York Knicks 3

1997 Eastern Conference Semifinals

1998

Miami Heat 2, New York Knicks 3

1998 Eastern Conference First Round

==== (2) Indiana Pacers vs. (7) Milwaukee Bucks ====
TBS

May 9
8:30 PM

Boxscore

Milwaukee Bucks 88, Indiana Pacers 110
Scoring by quarter: 24–27, 22–33, 26–21, 16–29
| Pts: Ray Allen 22; Rebs: Glenn Robinson 7 Asts: three players 3 each | Pts: Jalen Rose 24; Rebs: Dale Davis 15; Asts: Mark Jackson 12 |
Indiana leads series, 1–0

Market Square Arena, Indianapolis, Indiana
Attendance: 16,560
Referees: Eddie F. Rush, Bennett Salvatore, Don Vaden

TBS

May 11
9:30 PM

Boxscore

Milwaukee Bucks 107, Indiana Pacers 108 (OT)
Scoring by quarter: 28–23, 12–28, 32–17, 29–33, Overtime: 6–7
| Pts: Ray Allen 25; Rebs: Glenn Robinson 12; Asts: Sam Cassell 11 | Pts: Reggie Miller 30; Rebs: Antonio Davis 8 Asts: Jalen Rose 9 |
Indiana leads series, 2–0

Market Square Arena, Indianapolis, Indiana
Attendance: 16,608
Referees: Hue Hollins, Jack Nies, Greg Willard

TBS

May 13
9:00 PM
(8:00 PM CDT)

Boxscore

Indiana Pacers 99, Milwaukee Bucks 91
Scoring by quarter: 30–27, 23–25, 25–23, 21–16
| Pts: Reggie Miller 33; Rebs: Dale Davis 7 Asts: Mark Jackson 10 | Pts: Glenn Robinson 23; Rebs: Ray Allen 11; Asts: Sam Cassell 12 |
Indiana wins series, 3–0

Bradley Center, Milwaukee, Wisconsin
Attendance: 18,717
Referees: Dick Bavetta, Terry Durham, Tommy Nunez Sr.

Regular-season series
Indiana won 3–0 in the regular-season series

February 20, 1999

Recap

Indiana Pacers 82, Milwaukee Bucks 80

Bradley Center, Milwaukee

March 12, 1999

Recap

Milwaukee Bucks 104, Indiana Pacers 109

Market Square Arena, Indianapolis

April 21, 1999

Recap

Milwaukee Bucks 100, Indiana Pacers 108 (OT)

Market Square Arena, Indianapolis

This was the first playoff meeting between the Pacers and the Bucks.

==== (3) Orlando Magic vs. (6) Philadelphia 76ers ====
NBC

May 9
12:30 PM

Boxscore

Philadelphia 76ers 104, Orlando Magic 90
Scoring by quarter: 31–22, 19–25, 20–22, 34–21
| Pts: Allen Iverson 30; Rebs: George Lynch 12; Asts: Allen Iverson 7 | Pts: Penny Hardaway 19; Rebs: Horace Grant 10; Asts: Armstrong, Hardaway 6 each |
Philadelphia leads series, 1–0

Orlando Arena, Orlando, Florida
Attendance: 15,267
Referees: Joe Forte, Mike Mathis, Greg Willard

TBS

May 11
7:00 PM

Boxscore

Philadelphia 76ers 68, Orlando Magic 79
Scoring by quarter: 11–16, 16–20, 21–23, 20–20
| Pts: Allen Iverson 13; Rebs: Theo Ratliff 8 Asts: George Lynch 6 | Pts: Penny Hardaway 22; Rebs: Nick Anderson 8 Asts: three players 4 each |
Series tied, 1–1

Orlando Arena, Orlando, Florida
Attendance: 16,345
Referees: Terry Durham, Jess Kersey, Tommy Nunez Sr.

TBS

May 13
6:30 PM

Boxscore

Orlando Magic 85, Philadelphia 76ers 97
Scoring by quarter: 15–23, 16–23, 24–29, 30–22
| Pts: Nick Anderson 23; Rebs: Matt Harpring 10; Asts: Darrell Armstrong 7 | Pts: Allen Iverson 33; Rebs: Tyrone Hill 9 Asts: Eric Snow 8 |
Philadelphia leads series, 2–1

First Union Center, Philadelphia, Pennsylvania
Attendance: 20,874
Referees: Joe DeRosa, Hue Hollins, Ken Mauer

NBC

May 15
12:30 PM

Boxscore

Orlando Magic 91, Philadelphia 76ers 101
Scoring by quarter: 18–23, 18–24, 35–30, 20–24
| Pts: Nick Anderson 29; Rebs: Austin, Grant 8 each Asts: Darrell Armstrong 8 | Pts: Allen Iverson 37; Rebs: George Lynch 10; Asts: Allen Iverson 9 |
Philadelphia wins series, 3–1

First Union Center, Philadelphia, Pennsylvania
Attendance: 20,550
Referees: Ted Bernhardt, Ronnie Nunn, Bennett Salvatore

Regular-season series
Philadelphia won 2–1 in the regular-season series

February 6, 1999

Recap

Orlando Magic 75, Philadelphia 76ers 95

First Union Center, Philadelphia

March 15, 1999

Recap

Philadelphia 76ers 73, Orlando Magic 74

Orlando Arena, Orlando, Florida

April 25, 1999

Recap

Orlando Magic 86, Philadelphia 76ers 103

First Union Center, Philadelphia

This was the first playoff meeting between the 76ers and the Magic.

==== (4) Atlanta Hawks vs. (5) Detroit Pistons ====
TNT

May 8
8:30 PM

Boxscore

Detroit Pistons 70, Atlanta Hawks 90
Scoring by quarter: 19–28, 24–21, 11–24, 16–17
| Pts: Grant Hill 26; Rebs: Bison Dele 9 Asts: Grant Hill 8 | Pts: Steve Smith 19; Rebs: Dikembe Mutombo 19; Asts: Mookie Blaylock 7 |
Atlanta leads series, 1–0

Georgia Dome, Atlanta, Georgia
Attendance: 20,884
Referees: Mike Callahan, Bernie Fryer, Jess Kersey

TNT

May 10
8:00 PM

Boxscore

Detroit Pistons 69, Atlanta Hawks 89
Scoring by quarter: 20–18, 24–25, 9–26, 16–20
| Pts: Grant Hill 15; Rebs: Grant Hill 10; Asts: Joe Dumars 5 | Pts: Dikembe Mutombo 28; Rebs: Dikembe Mutombo 13; Asts: Mookie Blaylock 6 |
Atlanta leads series, 2–0

Georgia Dome, Atlanta, Georgia
Attendance: 16,377
Referees: Joe DeRosa, Ron Garretson, Steve Javie

TBS

May 12
7:00 PM

Boxscore

Atlanta Hawks 63, Detroit Pistons 79
Scoring by quarter: 13–22, 14–22, 21–18, 15–17
| Pts: Tyrone Corbin 16; Rebs: Dikembe Mutombo 10; Asts: Mookie Blaylock 5 | Pts: Christian Laettner 15; Rebs: Jerome Williams 10; Asts: Grant Hill 5 |
Atlanta leads series, 2–1

The Palace of Auburn Hills, Auburn Hills, Michigan
Attendance: 14,812
Referees: Hugh Evans, Nolan Fine, Luis Grillo

TBS

May 14
7:00 PM

Boxscore

Atlanta Hawks 82, Detroit Pistons 103
Scoring by quarter: 19–27, 20–27, 21–26, 22–23
| Pts: Steve Smith 21; Rebs: Dikembe Mutombo 8 Asts: Corbin, Johnson 4 each | Pts: Grant Hill 23; Rebs: Jerome Williams 8 Asts: Grant Hill 9 |
Series tied, 2–2

The Palace of Auburn Hills, Auburn Hills, Michigan
Attendance: 16,216
Referees: Jim Clark, Hue Hollins, Tommy Nunez Sr.

TNT

May 16
8:00 PM

Boxscore

Detroit Pistons 75, Atlanta Hawks 87
Scoring by quarter: 20–24, 20–19, 24–25, 11–19
| Pts: Grant Hill 21; Rebs: Dele, Hill 7 each Asts: Grant Hill 11 | Pts: Grant Long 26; Rebs: Dikembe Mutombo 18; Asts: Blaylock, Smith 6 each |
Atlanta wins series, 3–2

Alexander Memorial Coliseum, Atlanta, Georgia
Attendance: 8,460
Referees: Joe Crawford, Joe Forte, Derrick Stafford

Regular-season series
Detroit won 2–1 in the regular-season series

March 14, 1999

Recap

Atlanta Hawks 85, Detroit Pistons 72

The Palace of Auburn Hills, Auburn Hills, Michigan

March 30, 1999

Recap

Detroit Pistons 93, Atlanta Hawks 77

Georgia Dome, Atlanta

April 7, 1999

Recap

Atlanta Hawks 82, Detroit Pistons 89

The Palace of Auburn Hills, Auburn Hills, Michigan

This was the eighth playoff meeting between these two teams, with the Hawks winning four of the first seven meetings. This playoff series marked the last game of long time Piston and NBA Hall-of-Famer Joe Dumars, who retired at the end of the season.

Previous playoff series
Atlanta leads 4–3 in all-time playoff series

1956

Fort Wayne Pistons 3, St. Louis Hawks 2

1956 Western Division Finals

1958

Detroit Pistons 1, St. Louis Hawks 4

1958 Western Division Finals

1963

Detroit Pistons 1, St. Louis Hawks 3

1963 Western Division Semifinals

1986

Atlanta Hawks 3, Detroit Pistons 1

1986 Eastern Conference First Round

1987

Atlanta Hawks 1, Detroit Pistons 4

1987 Eastern Conference Semifinals

1991

Atlanta Hawks 2, Detroit Pistons 3

1991 Eastern Conference First Round

1997

Atlanta Hawks 3, Detroit Pistons 2

1997 Eastern Conference First Round

=== Western Conference first round ===
==== (1) San Antonio Spurs vs. (8) Minnesota Timberwolves ====
NBC

May 9
3:00 PM
(2:00 PM CDT)

Boxscore

Minnesota Timberwolves 86, San Antonio Spurs 99
Scoring by quarter: 26–26, 23–24, 17–23, 20–26
| Pts: Kevin Garnett 21; Rebs: Brandon, Garnett 8 each Asts: Terrell Brandon 11 | Pts: Tim Duncan 26; Rebs: Tim Duncan 12; Asts: Avery Johnson 10 |
San Antonio leads series, 1–0

Alamodome, San Antonio, Texas
Attendance: 22,356
Referees: Luis Grillo, Hue Hollins, David Jones

TNT

May 11
8:00 PM
(7:00 PM CDT)

Boxscore

Minnesota Timberwolves 80, San Antonio Spurs 71
Scoring by quarter: 19–21, 18–10, 23–20, 20–20
| Pts: Kevin Garnett 23; Rebs: Kevin Garnett 12; Asts: Terrell Brandon 9 | Pts: Tim Duncan 18; Rebs: Tim Duncan 16; Asts: Mario Elie 4 |
Series tied, 1–1

Alamodome, San Antonio, Texas
Attendance: 22,494
Referees: Ted Bernhardt, Ken Mauer, Bennett Salvatore

TNT

May 13
7:00 PM
(6:00 PM CDT)

Boxscore

San Antonio Spurs 85, Minnesota Timberwolves 71
Scoring by quarter: 17–16, 27–12, 19–20, 22–23
| Pts: Avery Johnson 24; Rebs: David Robinson 18; Asts: Duncan, Robinson 7 each | Pts: Kevin Garnett 23; Rebs: Kevin Garnett 12; Asts: three players 2 each |
San Antonio leads series, 2–1

Target Center, Minneapolis, Minnesota
Attendance: 17,444
Referees: Jess Kersey, Jack Nies, Bill Spooner

NBC

May 15
3:00 PM
(2:00 PM CDT)

Boxscore

San Antonio Spurs 92, Minnesota Timberwolves 85
Scoring by quarter: 21–26, 23–16, 20–21, 28–22
| Pts: David Robinson 19; Rebs: David Robinson 11; Asts: Avery Johnson 6 | Pts: Terrell Brandon 27; Rebs: Kevin Garnett 16; Asts: Brandon, Garnett 6 each |
San Antonio wins series, 3–1

Target Center, Minneapolis, Minnesota
Attendance: 15,898
Referees: Dick Bavetta, Terry Durham, Don Vaden

Regular-season series
Tied 2–2 in the regular-season series

February 6, 1999

Recap

Minnesota Timberwolves 82, San Antonio Spurs 96

Alamodome, San Antonio

February 9, 1999

Recap

San Antonio Spurs 70, Minnesota Timberwolves 74

Target Center, Minneapolis

February 22, 1999

Recap

San Antonio Spurs 89, Minnesota Timberwolves 95

Target Center, Minneapolis

April 14, 1999

Recap

Minnesota Timberwolves 79, San Antonio Spurs 95

Alamodome, San Antonio

This was the first playoff meeting between the Spurs and the Timberwolves.

==== (2) Portland Trail Blazers vs. (7) Phoenix Suns ====
NBC

May 8
3:00 PM
(12:00 PM PDT)

Boxscore

Phoenix Suns 85, Portland Trail Blazers 95
Scoring by quarter: 18–22, 23–18, 20–26, 24–29
| Pts: Jason Kidd 17; Rebs: Tom Gugliotta 9 Asts: Jason Kidd 7 | Pts: Isaiah Rider 25; Rebs: Brian Grant 10; Asts: Arvydas Sabonis 8 |
Portland leads series, 1–0

Rose Garden, Portland, Oregon
Attendance: 20,040
Referees: Dick Bavetta, Ted Bernhardt, Derrick Stafford

TNT

May 10
10:30 PM
(7:30 PM PDT)

Boxscore

Phoenix Suns 99, Portland Trail Blazers 110
Scoring by quarter: 17–33, 30–19, 20–23, 32–35
| Pts: Garrity, McCloud 15 each Rebs: Tom Gugliotta 9 Asts: Jason Kidd 12 | Pts: Grant, Stoudamire 22 each Rebs: Arvydas Sabonis 9 Asts: Damon Stoudamire 13 |
Portland leads series, 2–0

Rose Garden, Portland, Oregon
Attendance: 20,588
Referees: Jim Clark, Hugh Evans, Mark Wunderlich

TBS

May 12
9:30 PM
(6:30 PM MST)

Boxscore

Portland Trail Blazers 103, Phoenix Suns 93
Scoring by quarter: 36–23, 19–21, 14–28, 34–21
| Pts: Brian Grant 20; Rebs: Arvydas Sabonis 11; Asts: Damon Stoudamire 7 | Pts: Clifford Robinson 24; Rebs: Gugliotta, Robinson 7 each Asts: Jason Kidd 12 |
Portland wins series, 3–0

America West Arena, Phoenix, Arizona
Attendance: 17,306
Referees: Dan Crawford, Ronnie Nunn, Tom Washington

Regular-season series
Portland won 3–0 in the regular-season series

March 25, 1999

Recap

Phoenix Suns 84, Portland Trail Blazers 97

Rose Garden Arena, Portland, Oregon

March 28, 1999

Recap

Portland Trail Blazers 88, Phoenix Suns 86

America West Arena, Phoenix, Arizona

April 3, 1999

Recap

Phoenix Suns 93, Portland Trail Blazers 98

Rose Garden Arena, Portland, Oregon

This was the sixth playoff meeting between these two teams, with the Suns winning three of the first five meetings.

Previous playoff series
Phoenix leads 3–2 in all-time playoff series

1979

Phoenix Suns 2, Portland Trail Blazers 1

1979 Western Conference First Round

1984

Phoenix Suns 3, Portland Trail Blazers 2

1984 Western Conference First Round

1990

Phoenix Suns 2, Portland Trail Blazers 4

1990 Western Conference Finals

1992

Phoenix Suns 1, Portland Trail Blazers 4

1992 Western Conference Semifinals

1995

Phoenix Suns 3, Portland Trail Blazers 0

1995 Western Conference First Round

==== (3) Utah Jazz vs. (6) Sacramento Kings ====
NBC

May 8
5:30 PM
(3:30 PM MDT)

Boxscore

Sacramento Kings 87, Utah Jazz 117
Scoring by quarter: 20–37, 24–26, 23–25, 20–29
| Pts: Chris Webber 14; Rebs: Chris Webber 9 Asts: Chris Webber 3 | Pts: Karl Malone 21; Rebs: Greg Ostertag 9 Asts: Karl Malone 9 |
Utah leads series, 1–0

Delta Center, Salt Lake City, Utah
Attendance: 19,911
Referees: Jim Clark, Hue Hollins, Mark Wunderlich

TBS

May 10
9:30 PM
(7:30 PM MDT)

Boxscore

Sacramento Kings 101, Utah Jazz 90
Scoring by quarter: 31–24, 18–27, 29–25, 23–14
| Pts: Chris Webber 20; Rebs: Vlade Divac 7 Asts: Vlade Divac 8 | Pts: Karl Malone 33; Rebs: Karl Malone 10; Asts: Eisley, Stockton 6 each |
Series tied, 1–1

Delta Center, Salt Lake City, Utah
Attendance: 19,911
Referees: Joe Crawford, Bob Delaney, Tom Washington

TNT

May 12
10:30 PM
(7:30 PM PDT)

Boxscore

Utah Jazz 81, Sacramento Kings 84 (OT)
Scoring by quarter: 17–28, 20–13, 19–19, 21–17, Overtime: 4–7
| Pts: Karl Malone 22; Rebs: Karl Malone 13; Asts: Malone, Stockton 5 each | Pts: Vlade Divac 22; Rebs: Vlade Divac 14; Asts: Jason Williams 6 |
Sacramento leads series, 2–1

ARCO Arena, Sacramento, California
Attendance: 17,317
Referees: Mike Callahan, Steve Javie, Eddie F. Rush

TNT

May 14
10:30 PM
(7:30 PM PDT)

Boxscore

Utah Jazz 90, Sacramento Kings 89
Scoring by quarter: 23–26, 20–18, 21–21, 26–24
| Pts: Karl Malone 23; Rebs: Karl Malone 16; Asts: John Stockton 8 | Pts: Chris Webber 18; Rebs: Vlade Divac 14; Asts: Jason Williams 6 |
Series tied, 2–2

ARCO Arena, Sacramento, California
Attendance: 17,317
Referees: Dan Crawford, Ron Garretson, Greg Willard

NBC

May 16
5:30 PM
(3:30 PM MDT)

Boxscore

Sacramento Kings 92, Utah Jazz 99 (OT)
Scoring by quarter: 21–28, 21–24, 25–20, 21–16, Overtime: 4–11
| Pts: Vernon Maxwell 22; Rebs: Chris Webber 14; Asts: Vlade Divac 5 | Pts: Karl Malone 20; Rebs: Karl Malone 12; Asts: John Stockton 14 |
Utah wins series, 3–2

Delta Center, Salt Lake City, Utah
Attendance: 19,911
Referees: Dick Bavetta, Hue Hollins, Jack Nies

Regular-season series
Utah won 2–1 in the regular-season series

February 15, 1999

Recap

Sacramento Kings 112, Utah Jazz 120 (OT)

Delta Center, Salt Lake City

March 30, 1999

Recap

Utah Jazz 101, Sacramento Kings 104 (OT)

ARCO Arena, Sacramento, California

April 13, 1999

Recap

Utah Jazz 105, Sacramento Kings 100 (OT)

ARCO Arena, Sacramento, California

This was the first playoff meeting between the Kings and the Jazz.

==== (4) Los Angeles Lakers vs. (5) Houston Rockets ====
NBC

May 9
5:30 PM
(2:30 PM PDT)

Boxscore

Houston Rockets 100, Los Angeles Lakers 101
Scoring by quarter: 22–15, 19–37, 29–25, 30–24
| Pts: Charles Barkley 25; Rebs: Barkley, Pippen 10 each Asts: Scottie Pippen 8 | Pts: Glen Rice 29; Rebs: Shaquille O'Neal 11; Asts: Derek Fisher 6 |
LA Lakers lead series, 1–0

Great Western Forum, Inglewood, California
Attendance: 17,505
Referees: Dick Bavetta, Ted Bernhardt, Derrick Stafford

TNT

May 11
10:30 PM
(7:30 PM PDT)

Boxscore

Houston Rockets 98, Los Angeles Lakers 110
Scoring by quarter: 12–31, 28–24, 28–32, 30–23
| Pts: Sam Mack 20; Rebs: Charles Barkley 13; Asts: Scottie Pippen 5 | Pts: Shaquille O'Neal 28; Rebs: Robert Horry 10; Asts: Shaquille O'Neal 7 |
LA Lakers lead series, 2–0

Great Western Forum, Inglewood, California
Attendance: 17,505
Referees: Joe Crawford, Bob Delaney, Bill Spooner

TNT

May 13
9:30 PM
(8:30 PM CDT)

Boxscore

Los Angeles Lakers 88, Houston Rockets 102
Scoring by quarter: 27–20, 17–34, 25–22, 19–26
| Pts: Shaquille O'Neal 26; Rebs: Shaquille O'Neal 10; Asts: Derek Fisher 6 | Pts: Scottie Pippen 37; Rebs: Charles Barkley 23; Asts: Brent Price 7 |
LA Lakers lead series, 2–1

Compaq Center, Houston, Texas
Attendance: 16,285
Referees: Ronnie Nunn, Bennett Salvatore, Don Vaden

NBC

May 15
5:30 PM
(4:30 PM CDT)

Boxscore

Los Angeles Lakers 98, Houston Rockets 88
Scoring by quarter: 25–21, 24–17, 22–26, 27–24
| Pts: Shaquille O'Neal 37; Rebs: Shaquille O'Neal 11; Asts: Kobe Bryant 8 | Pts: Charles Barkley 20; Rebs: Scottie Pippen 17; Asts: Charles Barkley 6 |
LA Lakers win series, 3–1

Compaq Center, Houston, Texas
Attendance: 16,285
Referees: Bernie Fryer, Jess Kersey, Ken Mauer

Regular-season series
Los Angeles won 2–1 in the regular-season series

February 5, 1999

Recap

Houston Rockets 91, Los Angeles Lakers 99

Great Western Forum, Inglewood, California

February 28, 1999

Recap

Houston Rockets 90, Los Angeles Lakers 106

Great Western Forum, Inglewood, California

April 26, 1999

Recap

Los Angeles Lakers 80, Houston Rockets 102

Compaq Center, Houston, Texas

This was the sixth playoff meeting between these two teams, with the Rockets winning three of the first five meetings.

Previous playoff series
Houston leads 3–2 in all-time playoff series

1981

Houston Rockets 2, Los Angeles Lakers 1

1981 Western Conference First Round

1986

Houston Rockets 4, Los Angeles Lakers 1

1986 Western Conference Finals

1990

Houston Rockets 1, Los Angeles Lakers 3

1990 Western Conference First Round

1991

Houston Rockets 0, Los Angeles Lakers 3

1991 Western Conference First Round

1996

Houston Rockets 3, Los Angeles Lakers 1

1996 Western Conference First Round

== Conference semifinals ==
=== Eastern Conference semifinals ===
==== (2) Indiana Pacers vs. (6) Philadelphia 76ers ====
TBS

May 17
7:00 PM

Boxscore

Philadelphia 76ers 90, Indiana Pacers 94
Scoring by quarter: 20–19, 26–31, 20–24, 24–20
| Pts: Allen Iverson 35; Rebs: Matt Geiger 11; Asts: Eric Snow 10 | Pts: Jalen Rose 27; Rebs: Antonio Davis 10; Asts: Mark Jackson 6 |
Indiana leads series, 1–0

Market Square Arena, Indianapolis, Indiana
Attendance: 16,723
Referees: Dan Crawford, Bob Delaney, Luis Grillo

TNT

May 19
7:00 PM

Boxscore

Philadelphia 76ers 82, Indiana Pacers 85
Scoring by quarter: 16–26, 16–19, 21–16, 29–24
| Pts: Allen Iverson 23; Rebs: Theo Ratliff 12; Asts: Eric Snow 6 | Pts: Rik Smits 25; Rebs: Dale Davis 14; Asts: Mark Jackson 14 |
Indiana leads series, 2–0

Market Square Arena, Indianapolis, Indiana
Attendance: 16,795
Referees: Steve Javie, Jack Nies, Don Vaden

TNT

May 21
8:00 PM

Boxscore

Indiana Pacers 97, Philadelphia 76ers 86
Scoring by quarter: 28–22, 21–19, 26–25, 22–20
| Pts: Reggie Miller 29; Rebs: Dale Davis 11; Asts: Mark Jackson 10 | Pts: Allen Iverson 32; Rebs: Tyrone Hill 12; Asts: Eric Snow 9 |
Indiana leads series, 3–0

First Union Center, Philadelphia, Pennsylvania
Attendance: 20,930
Referees: Joe Crawford, Bernie Fryer, Derrick Stafford

NBC

May 23
12:30 PM

Boxscore

Indiana Pacers 89, Philadelphia 76ers 86
Scoring by quarter: 31–17, 19–24, 23–21, 16–24
| Pts: Reggie Miller 23; Rebs: Dale Davis 13; Asts: Mark Jackson 13 | Pts: Allen Iverson 25; Rebs: Matt Geiger 13; Asts: Eric Snow 7 |
Indiana wins series, 4–0

First Union Center, Philadelphia, Pennsylvania
Attendance: 20,844
Referees: Hugh Evans, Mike Mathis, Eddie F. Rush

Regular-season series
Philadelphia won 2–1 in the regular-season series

February 18, 1999

Recap

Philadelphia 76ers 95, Indiana Pacers 99

Market Square Arena, Indianapolis

March 17, 1999

Recap

Indiana Pacers 110, Philadelphia 76ers 114

First Union Center, Philadelphia

April 16, 1999

Recap

Indiana Pacers 83, Philadelphia 76ers 93

First Union Center, Philadelphia

This was the second playoff meeting between these two teams, with the 76ers winning the first meeting.

Previous playoff series
Philadelphia leads 1–0 in all-time playoff series

1981

Indiana Pacers 0, Philadelphia 76ers 2

1981 Eastern Conference First Round

==== (4) Atlanta Hawks vs. (8) New York Knicks ====
TNT

May 18
8:00 PM

Boxscore

New York Knicks 100, Atlanta Hawks 92
Scoring by quarter: 27–21, 21–29, 32–23, 20–19
| Pts: Allan Houston 34; Rebs: Chris Dudley 9 Asts: Charlie Ward 7 | Pts: Chris Crawford 26; Rebs: Dikembe Mutombo 13; Asts: Mookie Blaylock 4 |
New York leads series, 1–0

Georgia Dome, Atlanta, Georgia
Attendance: 18,513
Referees: Ted Bernhardt, Jess Kersey, Bennett Salvatore

TNT

May 20
8:00 PM

Boxscore

New York Knicks 77, Atlanta Hawks 70
Scoring by quarter: 17–20, 21–16, 16–16, 23–18
| Pts: Latrell Sprewell 31; Rebs: Marcus Camby 13; Asts: Chris Childs 5 | Pts: Mookie Blaylock 17; Rebs: Dikembe Mutombo 17; Asts: Steve Smith 2 |
New York leads series, 2–0

Georgia Dome, Atlanta, Georgia
Attendance: 22,558
Referees: Dick Bavetta, Tommy Nunez Sr., Ronnie Nunn

NBC

May 23
3:00 PM

Boxscore

Atlanta Hawks 78, New York Knicks 90
Scoring by quarter: 22–25, 24–27, 11–14, 21–24
| Pts: Long, Smith 17 each Rebs: Dikembe Mutombo 16; Asts: Mookie Blaylock 3 | Pts: Houston, Sprewell 17 each Rebs: Chris Dudley 12; Asts: Chris Childs 6 |
New York leads series, 3–0

Madison Square Garden, New York City, New York
Attendance: 19,763
Referees: Joe DeRosa, Ron Garretson, Steve Javie

TBS

May 24
8:00 PM

Boxscore

Atlanta Hawks 66, New York Knicks 79
Scoring by quarter: 18–25, 19–23, 14–18, 15–13
| Pts: Steve Smith 14; Rebs: Long, Mutombo 11 each Asts: three players 3 each | Pts: Allan Houston 19; Rebs: Patrick Ewing 9 Asts: Charlie Ward 6 |
New York wins series, 4–0

Madison Square Garden, New York City, New York
Attendance: 19,763
Referees: Dan Crawford, Ken Mauer, Derrick Stafford

Regular-season series
Atlanta won 2–1 in the regular-season series

March 22, 1999

Recap

Atlanta Hawks 80, New York Knicks 71

Madison Square Garden, New York City

April 9, 1999

Recap

New York Knicks 86, Atlanta Hawks 78

Georgia Dome, Atlanta

April 28, 1999

Recap

New York Knicks 73, Atlanta Hawks 76

Georgia Dome, Atlanta

This was the second playoff meeting between these two teams, with the Knicks winning the first meeting.

Previous playoff series
New York leads 1–0 in all-time playoff series

1971

Atlanta Hawks 1, New York Knicks 4

1971 Eastern Conference Semifinals

=== Western Conference semifinals ===
==== (1) San Antonio Spurs vs. (4) Los Angeles Lakers ====
TBS

May 17
9:30 PM
(8:30 PM CDT)

Boxscore

Los Angeles Lakers 81, San Antonio Spurs 87
Scoring by quarter: 24–20, 17–27, 17–20, 23–20
| Pts: three players 21 each Rebs: Shaquille O'Neal 15; Asts: Kobe Bryant 6 | Pts: Tim Duncan 25; Rebs: Will Perdue 9 Asts: Avery Johnson 8 |
San Antonio leads series, 1–0

Alamodome, San Antonio, Texas
Attendance: 25,297
Referees: Joe DeRosa, Ron Garretson, Steve Javie

TNT

May 19
9:30 PM
(8:30 PM CDT)

Boxscore

Los Angeles Lakers 76, San Antonio Spurs 79
Scoring by quarter: 16–26, 25–18, 18–17, 17–18
| Pts: Kobe Bryant 28; Rebs: three players 8 each Asts: Kobe Bryant 4 | Pts: Tim Duncan 21; Rebs: Tim Duncan 8 Asts: Avery Johnson 10 |
San Antonio leads series, 2–0

Alamodome, San Antonio, Texas
Attendance: 33,293
Referees: Jim Clark, Joe Forte, Hue Hollins

NBC

May 22
5:30 PM
(2:30 PM PDT)

Boxscore

San Antonio Spurs 103, Los Angeles Lakers 91
Scoring by quarter: 22–20, 21–19, 24–27, 36–25
| Pts: Tim Duncan 37; Rebs: Tim Duncan 14; Asts: Avery Johnson 7 | Pts: Glen Rice 24; Rebs: Shaquille O'Neal 15; Asts: Derek Fisher 9 |
San Antonio leads series, 3–0

Great Western Forum, Inglewood, California
Attendance: 17,505
Referees: Ted Bernhardt, Jess Kersey, Bennett Salvatore

NBC

May 23
5:30 PM
(2:30 PM PDT)

Boxscore

San Antonio Spurs 118, Los Angeles Lakers 107
Scoring by quarter: 35–29, 30–22, 21–33, 32–23
| Pts: Tim Duncan 33; Rebs: Tim Duncan 14; Asts: Avery Johnson 10 | Pts: Shaquille O'Neal 36; Rebs: Shaquille O'Neal 14; Asts: Fisher, Lue 6 each |
San Antonio wins series, 4–0

Great Western Forum, Inglewood, California
Attendance: 17,505
Referees: Dick Bavetta, Terry Durham, Jack Nies

In Game 2, Tim Duncan hit a game-winning hook shot with 8.4 seconds remaining.

Regular-season series
Los Angeles won 2–1 in the regular-season series

February 8, 1999

Recap

Los Angeles Lakers 80, San Antonio Spurs 75

Alamodome, San Antonio

February 19, 1999

Recap

San Antonio Spurs 94, Los Angeles Lakers 106

Great Western Forum, Inglewood, California

April 24, 1999

Recap

Los Angeles Lakers 81, San Antonio Spurs 108

Alamodome, San Antonio

This was the sixth playoff meeting between these two teams, with the Lakers winning four of the first five meetings.

Previous playoff series
Los Angeles leads 4–1 in all-time playoff series

1982

Los Angeles Lakers 4, San Antonio Spurs 0

1982 Western Conference Finals

1983

Los Angeles Lakers 4, San Antonio Spurs 2

1983 Western Conference Finals

1986

Los Angeles Lakers 3, San Antonio Spurs 0

1986 Western Conference First Round

1988

Los Angeles Lakers 3, San Antonio Spurs 0

1988 Western Conference First Round

1995

Los Angeles Lakers 2, San Antonio Spurs 4

1995 Western Conference Semifinals

==== (2) Portland Trail Blazers vs. (3) Utah Jazz ====
TNT

May 18
10:30 PM
(8:30 PM MDT)

Boxscore

Portland Trail Blazers 83, Utah Jazz 93
Scoring by quarter: 22–19, 28–29, 28–26, 5–19
| Pts: Brian Grant 19; Rebs: Arvydas Sabonis 11; Asts: Damon Stoudamire 5 | Pts: Karl Malone 25; Rebs: Karl Malone 12; Asts: John Stockton 7 |
Utah leads series, 1–0

Delta Center, Salt Lake City, Utah
Attendance: 19,911
Referees: Joe Crawford, Bernie Fryer, Eddie F. Rush

TNT

May 20
10:30 PM
(8:30 PM MDT)

Boxscore

Portland Trail Blazers 84, Utah Jazz 81
Scoring by quarter: 14–11, 18–20, 23–21, 29–29
| Pts: Isaiah Rider 27; Rebs: Arvydas Sabonis 14; Asts: Damon Stoudamire 6 | Pts: Karl Malone 23; Rebs: Karl Malone 17; Asts: John Stockton 9 |
Series tied, 1–1

Delta Center, Salt Lake City, Utah
Attendance: 19,911
Referees: Bob Delaney, Hugh Evans, Ken Mauer

NBC

May 22
3:00 PM
(12:00 PM PDT)

Boxscore

Utah Jazz 87, Portland Trail Blazers 97
Scoring by quarter: 16–22, 14–25, 25–25, 32–25
| Pts: Karl Malone 25; Rebs: Karl Malone 14; Asts: John Stockton 5 | Pts: Rasheed Wallace 20; Rebs: Brian Grant 15; Asts: Isaiah Rider 8 |
Portland leads series, 2–1

Rose Garden, Portland, Oregon
Attendance: 20,720
Referees: Dan Crawford, Joe Forte, Luis Grillo

TNT

May 23
8:30 PM
(5:30 PM PDT)

Boxscore

Utah Jazz 75, Portland Trail Blazers 81
Scoring by quarter: 11–20, 24–18, 23–18, 17–25
| Pts: Malone, Russell 17 each Rebs: Karl Malone 11; Asts: John Stockton 10 | Pts: Isaiah Rider 24; Rebs: Arvydas Sabonis 15; Asts: Greg Anthony 3 |
Portland leads series, 3–1

Rose Garden, Portland, Oregon
Attendance: 20,720
Referees: Jim Clark, Hue Hollins, Ronnie Nunn

TNT

May 25
8:00 PM
(6:00 PM MDT)

Boxscore

Portland Trail Blazers 71, Utah Jazz 88
Scoring by quarter: 20–30, 22–19, 16–20, 13–19
| Pts: Isaiah Rider 16; Rebs: Brian Grant 10; Asts: Damon Stoudamire 6 | Pts: Karl Malone 23; Rebs: Ostertag, Russell 9 each Asts: John Stockton 14 |
Portland leads series, 3–2

Delta Center, Salt Lake City, Utah
Attendance: 19,911
Referees: Dick Bavetta, Terry Durham, Ron Garretson

TNT

May 27
9:00 PM
(6:00 PM PDT)

Boxscore

Utah Jazz 80, Portland Trail Blazers 92
Scoring by quarter: 18–21, 24–21, 19–22, 19–28
| Pts: Jeff Hornacek 21; Rebs: Karl Malone 7 Asts: John Stockton 10 | Pts: Isaiah Rider 24; Rebs: Brian Grant 12; Asts: Jim Jackson 6 |
Portland wins series, 4–2

Rose Garden, Portland, Oregon
Attendance: 20,727
Referees: Steve Javie, Mike Mathis, Don Vaden

Regular-season series
Utah won 2–1 in the regular-season series

March 2, 1999

Recap

Utah Jazz 100, Portland Trail Blazers 102 (2OT)

Rose Garden Arena, Portland, Oregon

March 12, 1999

Recap

Utah Jazz 91, Portland Trail Blazers 77

Rose Garden Arena, Portland, Oregon

April 23, 1999

Recap

Portland Trail Blazers 85, Utah Jazz 96

Delta Center, Salt Lake City

This was the fifth playoff meeting between these two teams, with each team winning two series apiece.

Previous playoff series
Tied 2–2 in all-time playoff series

1988

Portland Trail Blazers 1, Utah Jazz 3

1988 Western Conference First Round

1991

Portland Trail Blazers 4, Utah Jazz 1

1991 Western Conference Semifinals

1992

Portland Trail Blazers 4, Utah Jazz 2

1992 Western Conference Finals

1996

Portland Trail Blazers 2, Utah Jazz 3

1996 Western Conference First Round

== Conference finals ==
=== Eastern Conference finals ===
==== (2) Indiana Pacers vs. (8) New York Knicks ====
NBC

May 30
5:30 PM

Boxscore

New York Knicks 93, Indiana Pacers 90
Scoring by quarter: 25–21, 19–19, 26–23, 23–27
| Pts: Allan Houston 19; Rebs: Patrick Ewing 10; Asts: Childs, Ward 5 each | Pts: Reggie Miller 19; Rebs: A. Davis, Jackson 7 each Asts: Mark Jackson 11 |
New York leads series, 1–0

Market Square Arena, Indianapolis, Indiana
Attendance: 16,575
Referees: Hugh Evans, Bernie Fryer, Bennett Salvatore

TNT

June 1
8:30 PM

Boxscore

New York Knicks 86, Indiana Pacers 88
Scoring by quarter: 22–28, 24–29, 22–14, 18–17
| Pts: Larry Johnson 22; Rebs: Marcus Camby 13; Asts: three players 3 each | Pts: Mark Jackson 17; Rebs: Dale Davis 12; Asts: Mark Jackson 8 |
Series tied, 1–1

Market Square Arena, Indianapolis, Indiana
Attendance: 16,586
Referees: Dick Bavetta, Joe Forte, Hue Hollins

NBC

June 5
6:30 PM

Boxscore

Indiana Pacers 91, New York Knicks 92
Scoring by quarter: 17–17, 30–25, 22–27, 22–23
| Pts: Rik Smits 25; Rebs: Antonio Davis 8 Asts: Mark Jackson 9 | Pts: Larry Johnson 26; Rebs: Marcus Camby 11; Asts: Chris Childs 10 |
New York leads series, 2–1

Madison Square Garden, New York City, New York
Attendance: 19,763
Referees: Terry Durham, Steve Javie, Jess Kersey

NBC

June 7
9:00 PM

Boxscore

Indiana Pacers 90, New York Knicks 78
Scoring by quarter: 22–20, 23–12, 21–25, 24–21
| Pts: Jalen Rose 19; Rebs: Dale Davis 12; Asts: Mark Jackson 4 | Pts: Marcus Camby 18; Rebs: Marcus Camby 14; Asts: Chris Childs 8 |
Series tied, 2–2

Madison Square Garden, New York City, New York
Attendance: 19,763
Referees: Joe Crawford, Ron Garretson, Eddie F. Rush

NBC

June 9
9:00 PM

Boxscore

New York Knicks 101, Indiana Pacers 94
Scoring by quarter: 14–28, 28–14, 23–27, 36–25
| Pts: Latrell Sprewell 29; Rebs: Marcus Camby 13; Asts: Chris Childs 7 | Pts: Reggie Miller 30; Rebs: Dale Davis 18; Asts: Mark Jackson 4 |
New York leads series, 3–2

Market Square Arena, Indianapolis, Indiana
Attendance: 16,541
Referees: Dan Crawford, Bob Delaney, Ronnie Nunn

NBC

June 11
9:00 PM

Boxscore

Indiana Pacers 82, New York Knicks 90
Scoring by quarter: 17–14, 18–27, 24–18, 23–31
| Pts: Rik Smits 20; Rebs: Dale Davis 12; Asts: Jackson, Miller 4 each | Pts: Allan Houston 32; Rebs: Marcus Camby 9 Asts: Chris Childs 4 |
New York wins series, 4–2

Madison Square Garden, New York City, New York
Attendance: 19,763
Referees: Dick Bavetta, Hue Hollins, Mike Mathis

In Game 2 Reggie Miller hit the game winning free throws with 2 seconds remaining.

In Game 3 Larry Johnson makes a game-winning 4-point play with 5.7 seconds left.

Until 2025, Game 6 was the last time the Knicks won a playoff series at home.

Regular-season series
Indiana won 2–1 in the regular-season series

March 30, 1999

Recap

Indiana Pacers 93, New York Knicks 94

Madison Square Garden, New York City

April 4, 1999

Recap

New York Knicks 95, Indiana Pacers 108

Market Square Arena, Indianapolis

May 2, 1999

Recap

New York Knicks 71, Indiana Pacers 94

Market Square Arena, Indianapolis

This was the fifth playoff meeting between these two teams, with each team winning two series apiece.

Previous playoff series
Tied 2–2 in all-time playoff series

1993

Indiana Pacers 1, New York Knicks 3

1993 Eastern Conference First Round

1994

Indiana Pacers 3, New York Knicks 4

1994 Eastern Conference Finals

1995

Indiana Pacers 4, New York Knicks 3

1995 Eastern Conference Semifinals

1998

Indiana Pacers 4, New York Knicks 1

1998 Eastern Conference Semifinals

=== Western Conference finals ===
==== (1) San Antonio Spurs vs. (2) Portland Trail Blazers ====
NBC

May 29
5:30 PM
(4:30 PM CDT)

Boxscore

Portland Trail Blazers 76, San Antonio Spurs 80
Scoring by quarter: 19–22, 19–17, 18–20, 20–21
| Pts: Rasheed Wallace 28; Rebs: Rasheed Wallace 8 Asts: Damon Stoudamire 8 | Pts: Duncan, Robinson 21 each Rebs: Tim Duncan 13; Asts: Avery Johnson 9 |
San Antonio leads series, 1–0

Alamodome, San Antonio, Texas
Attendance: 35,165
Referees: Joe Crawford, Jess Kersey, Eddie F. Rush

NBC

May 31
5:30 PM
(4:30 PM CDT)

Boxscore

Portland Trail Blazers 85, San Antonio Spurs 86
Scoring by quarter: 31–20, 17–14, 19–26, 18–26
| Pts: Arvydas Sabonis 17; Rebs: Grant, Sabonis 7 each Asts: Damon Stoudamire 7 | Pts: Tim Duncan 23; Rebs: Tim Duncan 10; Asts: Avery Johnson 7 |
San Antonio leads series, 2–0

Alamodome, San Antonio, Texas
Attendance: 35,260
Referees: Dan Crawford, Bob Delaney, Ron Garretson

NBC

June 4
9:00 PM
(6:00 PM PDT)

Boxscore

San Antonio Spurs 85, Portland Trail Blazers 63
Scoring by quarter: 22–26, 18–12, 24–8, 21–17
| Pts: Jaren Jackson 19; Rebs: David Robinson 9 Asts: Avery Johnson 8 | Pts: Rasheed Wallace 22; Rebs: Brian Grant 13; Asts: Stoudamire, Williams 3 each |
San Antonio leads series, 3–0

Rose Garden, Portland, Oregon
Attendance: 20,732
Referees: Bernie Fryer, Mike Mathis, Ronnie Nunn

NBC

June 6
6:30 PM
(3:30 PM PDT)

Boxscore

San Antonio Spurs 94, Portland Trail Blazers 80
Scoring by quarter: 23–18, 20–16, 19–25, 32–21
| Pts: David Robinson 20; Rebs: David Robinson 10; Asts: Avery Johnson 6 | Pts: Damon Stoudamire 21; Rebs: Arvydas Sabonis 7 Asts: three players 4 each |
San Antonio wins series, 4–0

Rose Garden, Portland, Oregon
Attendance: 20,735
Referees: Hugh Evans, Jack Nies, Bennett Salvatore

Regular-season series
San Antonio won 3–1 in the regular-season series

March 19, 1999

Recap

San Antonio Spurs 85, Portland Trail Blazers 90

Rose Garden Arena, Portland, Oregon

April 16, 1999

Recap

Portland Trail Blazers 80, San Antonio Spurs 81

Alamodome, San Antonio

May 1, 1999

Recap

Portland Trail Blazers 90, San Antonio Spurs 98 (OT)

Alamodome, San Antonio

May 4, 1999

Recap

San Antonio Spurs 87, Portland Trail Blazers 81

Rose Garden Arena, Portland, Oregon

In Game 2, Sean Elliott hit a game-winning three-pointer with 9 seconds remaining.

This was the third playoff meeting between these two teams, with each team winning one series apiece.

Previous playoff series
Tied 1–1 in all-time playoff series

1990

Portland Trail Blazers 4, San Antonio Spurs 3

1990 Western Conference Semifinals

1993

Portland Trail Blazers 1, San Antonio Spurs 3

1993 Western Conference First Round

== NBA Finals: (W1) San Antonio Spurs vs. (E8) New York Knicks ==
NBC

June 16
9:00 PM
(8:00 PM CDT)

Boxscore

New York Knicks 77, San Antonio Spurs 89
Scoring by quarter: 27–21, 10–24, 26–26, 14–18
| Pts: Houston, Sprewell 19 each Rebs: Kurt Thomas 16; Asts: three players 3 each | Pts: Tim Duncan 33; Rebs: Tim Duncan 16; Asts: Avery Johnson 8 |
San Antonio leads series, 1–0

Alamodome, San Antonio, Texas
Attendance: 39,514
Referees: Hugh Evans, Steve Javie, Bennett Salvatore

NBC

June 18
9:00 PM
(8:00 PM CDT)

Boxscore

New York Knicks 67, San Antonio Spurs 80
Scoring by quarter: 15–20, 19–19, 15–17, 18–24
| Pts: Latrell Sprewell 26; Rebs: Marcus Camby 11; Asts: Charlie Ward 3 | Pts: Tim Duncan 25; Rebs: Tim Duncan 15; Asts: Avery Johnson 5 |
San Antonio leads series, 2–0

Alamodome, San Antonio, Texas
Attendance: 39,554
Referees: Dan Crawford, Joe Crawford, Jess Kersey

NBC

June 21
9:00 PM

Boxscore

San Antonio Spurs 81, New York Knicks 89
Scoring by quarter: 21–32, 25–17, 16–16, 19–24
| Pts: David Robinson 25; Rebs: Tim Duncan 12; Asts: Avery Johnson 4 | Pts: Allan Houston 34; Rebs: Kurt Thomas 10; Asts: Latrell Sprewell 5 |
San Antonio leads series, 2–1

Madison Square Garden, New York City, New York
Attendance: 19,763
Referees: Dick Bavetta, Hue Hollins, Ronnie Nunn

NBC

June 23
9:00 PM

Boxscore

San Antonio Spurs 96, New York Knicks 89
Scoring by quarter: 27–29, 23–17, 22–17, 24–26
| Pts: Tim Duncan 28; Rebs: Tim Duncan 18; Asts: Avery Johnson 10 | Pts: Latrell Sprewell 26; Rebs: Marcus Camby 13; Asts: Charlie Ward 8 |
San Antonio leads series, 3–1

Madison Square Garden, New York City, New York
Attendance: 19,763
Referees: Hugh Evans, Ron Garretson, Mike Mathis

NBC

June 25
9:00 PM

Boxscore

San Antonio Spurs 78, New York Knicks 77
Scoring by quarter: 20–23, 20–15, 19–20, 19–19
| Pts: Tim Duncan 31; Rebs: David Robinson 12; Asts: Avery Johnson 9 | Pts: Latrell Sprewell 35; Rebs: Latrell Sprewell 10; Asts: Allan Houston 5 |
San Antonio wins series, 4–1

Madison Square Garden, New York City, New York
Attendance: 19,763
Referees: Joe Crawford, Steve Javie, Bennett Salvatore

The teams did not meet in the regular season.

This was the first playoff meeting between the Spurs and the Knicks.

== Statistical leaders ==
| Category | Game high | | | Average | | | |
| Category | Player | Team | High | Player | Team | Avg. | GP |
|---|---|---|---|---|---|---|---|
| Points | Tim Duncan; Shaquille O'Neal; Allen Iverson; Scottie Pippen | San Antonio Spurs; Los Angeles Lakers; Philadelphia 76ers Houston Rockets | 37 | Allen Iverson | Philadelphia 76ers | 28.5 | 8 |
| Rebounds | Charles Barkley | Houston Rockets | 23 | Dikembe Mutombo | Atlanta Hawks | 13.9 | 9 |
| Assists | Mark Jackson; John Stockton | Indiana Pacers; Utah Jazz | 14 | Jason Kidd | Phoenix Suns | 10.3 | 3 |
| Steals | Allen Iverson | Philadelphia 76ers | 10 | Allen Iverson | Philadelphia 76ers | 2.5 | 8 |
| Blocks | David Robinson | San Antonio Spurs | 7 | Shaquille O'Neal | Los Angeles Lakers | 2.9 | 8 |
