= Carlos Arroyo =

Puerto Rican basketball player (born 1979)

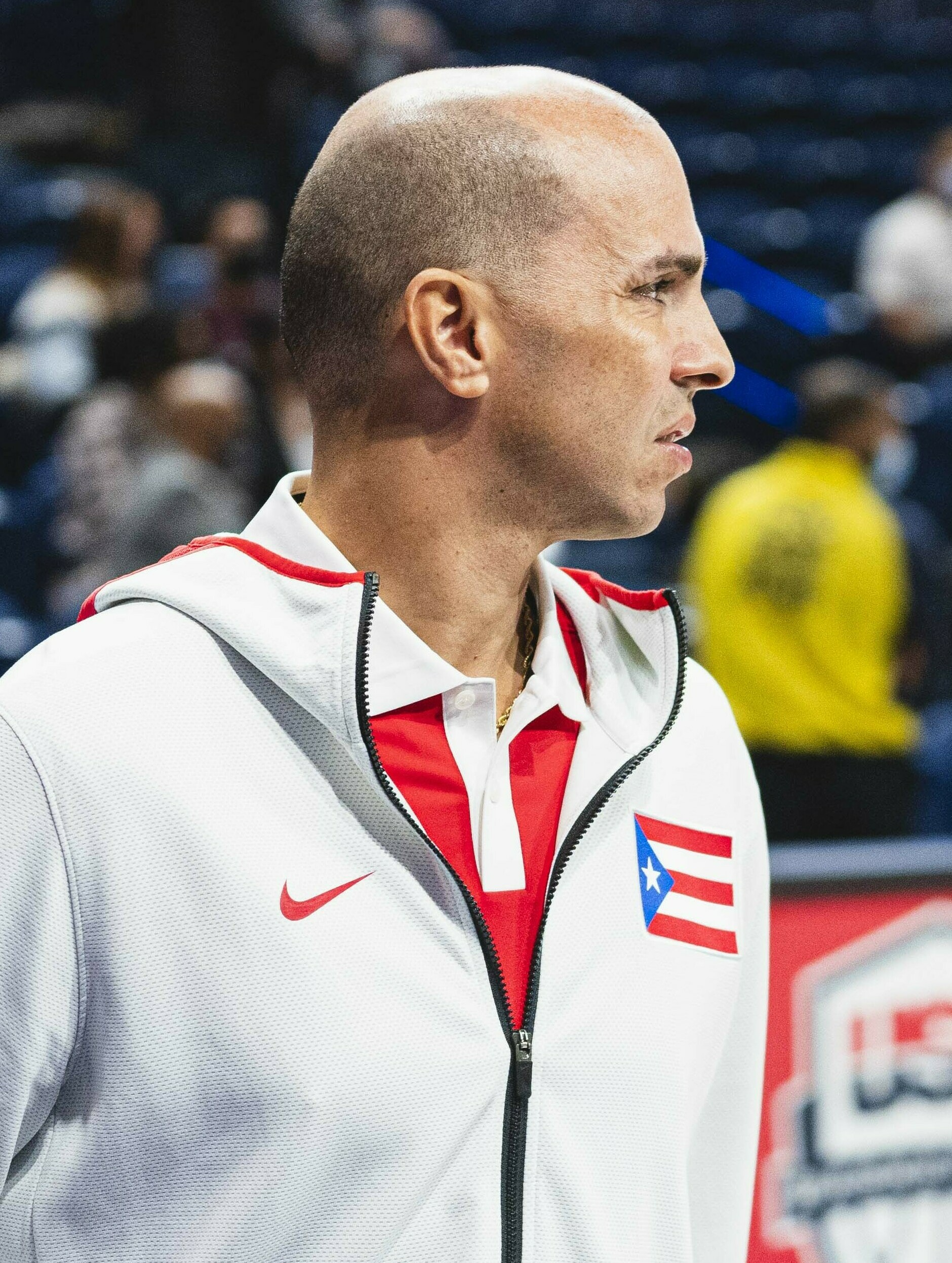
- Arroyo in 2022

Personal information
- Born: July 30, 1979 (age 47) Fajardo, Puerto Rico
- Listed height: 6 ft 2 in (1.88 m)
- Listed weight: 200 lb (91 kg)

Career information
- High school: Colegio Apostol de Fajardo
- College: FIU (1997–2001)
- NBA draft: 2001: undrafted
- Playing career: 2001–2019
- Position: Point guard
- Number: 21, 7, 8, 30, 45

Career history
- 1996-1997: Cariduros de Fajardo
- 1998–2003: Cangrejeros de Santurce
- 2001–2002: Toronto Raptors
- 2002: Denver Nuggets
- 2002: TAU Cerámica
- 2002–2005: Utah Jazz
- 2005–2006: Detroit Pistons
- 2006–2008: Orlando Magic
- 2008–2009: Maccabi Tel Aviv
- 2009–2011: Miami Heat
- 2011: Boston Celtics
- 2011–2012: Beşiktaş
- 2013–2015: Galatasaray
- 2015: Cangrejeros de Santurce
- 2015–2016: FC Barcelona
- 2016–2017: Leones de Ponce
- 2017–2019: Cariduros de Fajardo

Career highlights
- FIBA Americas League Ideal Quintet (2017); Israeli League Finals MVP (2009); Israeli League champion (2009); Israeli League Assists Leader (2009); Turkish Cup winner (2012); Turkish Super League Finals MVP (2012); EuroChallenge champion (2012); 2× Turkish Super League champion (2012, 2013); BSL All-Star MVP (2015); Spanish Supercup winner (2015); Centrobasket MVP (2010); 5× BSN champion (1998–2001, 2003); BSN Finals MVP (2003); BSN All-Star MVP (2017); BSN Rookie of the Year (1996); No. 7 retired by Cangrejeros de Santurce; No. 7 retired by Puerto Rico National Team; 2× All-Sun Belt (2000, 2001); No. 30 retired by FIU Panthers
- Stats at NBA.com
- Stats at Basketball Reference
Medals
Men's basketball
Representing Puerto Rico
FIBA AmeriCup
Silver medal – second place	2009 Puerto Rico
Silver medal – second place	2013 Venezuela
Bronze medal – third place	2003 Puerto Rico
Bronze medal – third place	2007 Las Vegas
Pan American Games
Gold medal – first place	2011 Mexico
Bronze medal – third place	2003 Dominican Republic
Centrobasket
Gold medal – first place	2003 Mexico
Gold medal – first place	2008 Mexico
Gold medal – first place	2010 Dominican Republic
Bronze medal – third place	2006 Panama
Central American and Caribbean Games
Gold medal – first place	2010 Puerto Rico
FIBA CBC Championship
Gold medal – first place	2007 Puerto Rico

Carlos Alberto Arroyo Bermúdez (born July 30, 1979) is a Puerto Rican former professional basketball player. He played in the National Basketball Association with the Toronto Raptors, Denver Nuggets, Utah Jazz, Detroit Pistons, Orlando Magic, Miami Heat, and Boston Celtics.

In the 2008–09 season, he played for Maccabi Tel Aviv in the Israeli Basketball Premier League, winning the league's championship, and being named the Final's Most Valuable Player. In 2009 he also was the Israeli Premier League Assists Leader. He has also played professionally in Puerto Rico, Spain, and Turkey.

Arroyo was a member of the senior Puerto Rican national basketball team that defeated the United States at the 2004 Summer Olympic Games. He also represented Puerto Rico at the 2006 FIBA World Championship in Japan. In May 2019, Arroyo was picked by Trilogy to play in the Big3, a 3-on-3 basketball league founded by rapper Ice Cube. He played in that league for one season, and then turned his focus to music, releasing the international hit song, "Baila Reggaeton".

== Early years and education ==
Carlos Arroyo was born and raised in Fajardo, Puerto Rico. He is an identical twin, born along his brother Alberto. Arroyo is a cousin of actor Benicio del Toro.

Arroyo graduated from Colegio Santiago Apostol in Fajardo. Arroyo attended Brookwood School in Thomasville, Georgia, for his junior year in high school, where he averaged nearly 30 points and 10 assists per game.

== College career ==
Arroyo studied in Florida International University (FIU) from 1998 to 2001, where he played for the campus' team, the Golden Panthers. He was a four-year letterman at the university having completed his B.A while playing with the team for four years and establishing several team records. Among these records are the all-time lead in assists, as well as the single-season assist record, having 459 in one season.

Arroyo is also the only player in Florida International University to have scored more than six hundred points in a single season. He is also the second all-time leading scorer for FIU, having scored 1,600 points during his university career, with an average of 16.0 points per game and 4.6 assists per game over his 100 games. On December 30, 2000 at North Texas, Arroyo set FIU's single-game scoring record, dropping 39 points in an overtime loss to the Mean Green. His 15 field goals made and 29 attempts were also both single-game records for the Panthers.

Arroyo was also selected as a member of the Sun Belt Conference's All-Conference team on two separate occasions. On January 5, 2007, Florida International University held a ceremony where Arroyo's university number (30) was retired to recognize his play over his time there.

== Professional career ==
=== Early years ===
Arroyo began his professional career in the Baloncesto Superior Nacional of Puerto Rico when he was 17 years old. He debuted with the Cariduros de Fajardo in 1996. During his first season, he averaged 10.9 points per game while shooting 52%. The next year, he improved his numbers to 17 points and 5.5 assists per game. That season, he also shot 42% from the 3-point line.

The next year, he played for the Cangrejeros de Santurce, where he was a teammate of then starting center of the Puerto Rican national basketball team, José Ortiz. In 2000, Arroyo averaged 17.1 points and 3.9 assists per game. During his tenure with the team, the Cangrejeros won four consecutive national titles in 1998, 1999, 2000, 2001 and 2003, winning five league championships in six years.

=== First stint in the NBA (2001–2008) ===
After graduating from FIU, Arroyo was signed by the National Basketball Association's Toronto Raptors for the 2001–02 NBA season, but was released in January 2002. He then played briefly in the Spanish ACB League with TAU Cerámica before being signed by the Denver Nuggets in March of the same year. He saw limited action with those two teams, playing seventeen games with the Raptors and twenty with the Nuggets before his initial NBA season was over. He only played an average of 9.7 minutes per game during those thirty-seven games in which he saw action.

==== Utah Jazz ====
Arroyo joined the Utah Jazz for the 2002-03 NBA season. He did not play much during his first year in Utah; he was the team's third string point guard behind John Stockton and Mark Jackson. However, Arroyo watched and learned from Stockton and Jackson, and his time to play soon arrived.

Stockton retired shortly after the season ended, and Jackson joined the Houston Rockets during the offseason, leaving Arroyo as the starter for the 2003–04 season. With the retirement of Stockton and the subsequent departure of Karl Malone to the Los Angeles Lakers, it was expected that the Jazz would suffer through a miserable season and sink to the bottom of the league. However, to the surprise of many, the remaining Jazz players pulled together and kept the team competitive, even in the tough Midwest Division. With Arroyo leading the way, Utah finished with an impressive 42–40 record, narrowly missing a berth in the playoffs. Arroyo set career highs by averaging 12.6 points and 5.0 assists per game. He scored a career-high 30 points against the Minnesota Timberwolves on November 14, the 2nd highest single-game total ever for a Puerto Rican player in the NBA.

==== Detroit Pistons ====
During the 2004-05 NBA season with the Jazz, Arroyo had several disputes with head coach Jerry Sloan. He eventually found himself back on the bench. In January 2005, Arroyo was traded to the Detroit Pistons for veteran center Elden Campbell (who would quickly be waived and later be reclaimed by the Pistons) and a future first-round pick.

With the Pistons, Arroyo came within one game of becoming the third Puerto Rican to win an NBA championship after Butch Lee and JJ Barea In what was dubbed by some Hispanic newspapers as The Hispanic NBA Finals (because Arroyo played for the Pistons and Argentine Manu Ginóbili starred for the San Antonio Spurs), the Spurs won the series in seven games, with a final game score of 81–74. Arroyo's playing time was reduced significantly due to Larry Brown's tight defensive style.

Initially, with Pistons coach Flip Saunders' style of coaching, Arroyo received more minutes of playing time, and demonstrated value off the bench. He led the team in assists several times despite playing fewer minutes than other players. However, again, his minutes declined as the season progressed.

On January 11, 2006, Arroyo was suspended for one game after he made contact with an official during the Pistons' 96–86 victory over the New Orleans/Oklahoma City Hornets on January 10.

==== Orlando Magic ====
On February 15, 2006, Arroyo was dealt (along with Darko Miličić) from Detroit to the Orlando Magic, in exchange for Kelvin Cato and a future first-round draft choice.

The addition of Arroyo and Miličić, plus the return of point guard Jameer Nelson from the injured list, sparked a resurgence of the Magic in the last quarter of the 2005–2006 season, as they finished with a 12–3 run, nearly reaching the playoffs. During this run, the team had an eight-game winning streak, beating top teams such as the Dallas Mavericks, San Antonio Spurs, Miami Heat and the Detroit Pistons. During the stretch run, Arroyo averaged 22.1 MPG, 10.8 PPG, 2.8 APG, and 2.2 RPG off the bench, which earned him the back-up point guard position behind Nelson. These averages were significant improvements from the statistics he accumulated with the Pistons, when he averaged only 12 minutes per game. He scored a season-high 21 points against the Phoenix Suns on March 3, 2006. On April 9, 2006, Arroyo injured his left hamstring and was sidelined for four games, returning on April 17 and scoring 17 points in the last game of the season.

Arroyo started the 2006–07 season as the team's backup point guard but was demoted by the team's coach Brian Hill following an offensive slump, but regained his back-up position later in the season.

The Orlando Magic started the 2007–08 season with new coach Stan Van Gundy, and Arroyo was again assigned backup point-guard responsibilities. On November 28, 2007, he had a career-high 14 assists in a game against the Seattle SuperSonics. On December 29, 2007, Arroyo was promoted to the starting position after Nelson experienced an extended offensive slump. With Nelson in the starting lineup prior to this change, the team had been committing an average of seventeen turnovers per game, and Nelson had been unable to score in double digits on 10 out of 17 games. This led to Van Gundy making several references to the team's performance and leading to Arroyo's inclusion in the starting lineup. During Arroyo's first three games in the starting position the number of turnovers produced by the team was lowered to eleven per game. Arroyo's averaged double digits in these games as well as seventeen assists over that period. Arroyo closed January starting, the team finishing the month winning five out of six games.

However, after playing 5 minutes on February 6, 2008, and being replaced by Nelson, Arroyo saw his playing time limited again. Arroyo did not play from February 11, when he played for less than 10 minutes and scored 7 points, until March 1. In an interview with Puerto Rican newspaper El Nuevo Día, coach Van Gundy said that he preferred Keyon Dooling at back-up point guard. Due to injuries to both Nelson and Dooling, Arroyo was re-inserted into the starting lineup that day and ended up with 13 points and 8 assists in 41 minutes. Following the conclusion of the 2007–2008 NBA season Arroyo became a free agent. When interviewed, Arroyo noted that he was interested in returning to Orlando, but that he was also open to hearing offers from the New York Knicks and Miami Heat.

=== Maccabi (2008–2009) ===
In the summer of 2008, Arroyo signed a three-year contract with the Israeli League powerhouse Maccabi Tel Aviv after having spent the previous 6 years in the NBA. The contract was worth $7.5 million net income, with his team paying all of his taxes and that included opt-out options after each of the first two seasons In the end of the 2008–09 season with Maccabi, he won the Israeli League, being named the Most Valuable Player of the league's finals. In Israel, he averaged 15.3 points (51.6% 2FGP) in 31 mins per game.

=== Return to the NBA (2009–2011) ===
==== Miami Heat ====
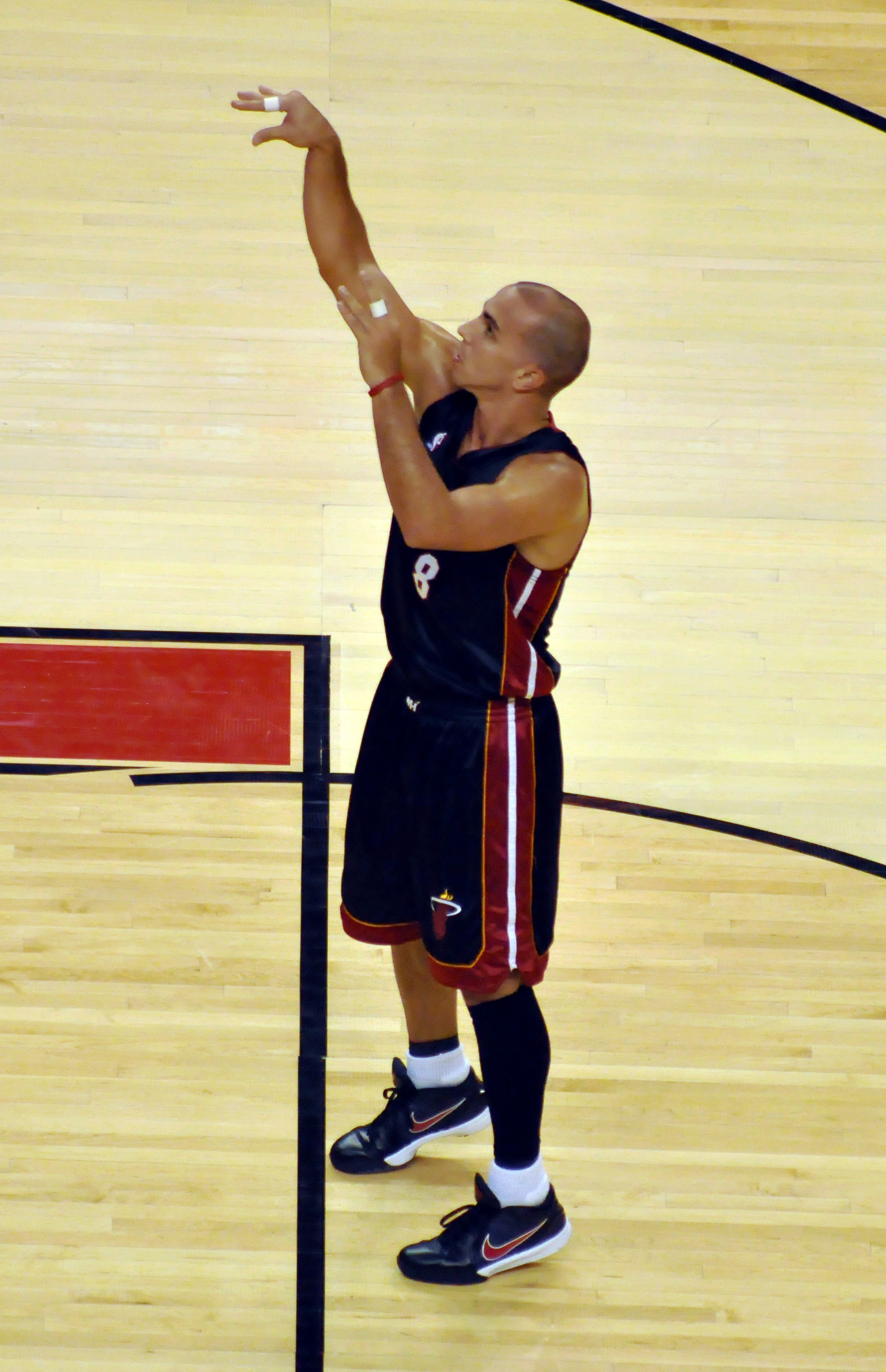
Arroyo with the Miami Heat in 2010

On October 11, 2009, Arroyo signed a non-guaranteed, one-year contract with the Miami Heat. He had an established residence in Pinecrest, Florida, and had participated in a workout with the team before signing. His contract was guaranteed for the full year later in the season.

Upon starting the season, Arroyo shared point guard responsibilities with Mario Chalmers. On January 7, 2010, the Heat signed veteran free agent Rafer Alston, sending Arroyo to the bench. However, Alston was suspended after starting 25 games and in early March, Arroyo was moved back to the starting lineup. Over the last two months of the season, Arroyo averaged 9 points and 4.5 assists per game. He finished the season with a 4.27-to-1 assist-to-turnover ratio, second only to Chris Paul's for the season. Arroyo averaged 6.8 points and 2.2 assists per game during the playoffs first round against the Boston Celtics where the Heat were eliminated in 5 games.

After the season ended, Arroyo became a free agent. However, on July 21, 2010, it was announced that he and the Heat had reached an agreement for the 2010–11 season. He began the season as the team's starting point guard. LeBron James's arrival meant a decrease in Arroyo's ball-handling responsibilities and so coach Erik Spoelstra encouraged Arroyo to be more proactive with his shots. On December 6, 2010, Arroyo had a perfect game shooting from the field (6–6 FG, 2–2 FT, 2–2 3PT), finishing with 18 points, 2 rebounds, and only 1 turnover. His 18 points were the most he had scored in 2 years.

On January 22, 2011, coach Spoelstra replaced Arroyo as the Miami Heat starting point guard with Mario Chalmers. According to Spoelstra, "It's not an indictment on Carlos... It's just something I think will be beneficial for the team right now." Although Arroyo and Chalmers shared similar statistics, the latter edged Arroyo in the significant +/- statistic. On March 1, 2011, the Heat released Arroyo in an effort to clear a roster spot for the expected addition of free-agent guard Mike Bibby. During the season, Arroyo started 42 games for the Heat, averaging 5.6 points and 2 assists per game. He also improved his 3-point shooting to a career-best 43.8%, leading the team in that statistic.

==== Boston Celtics ====
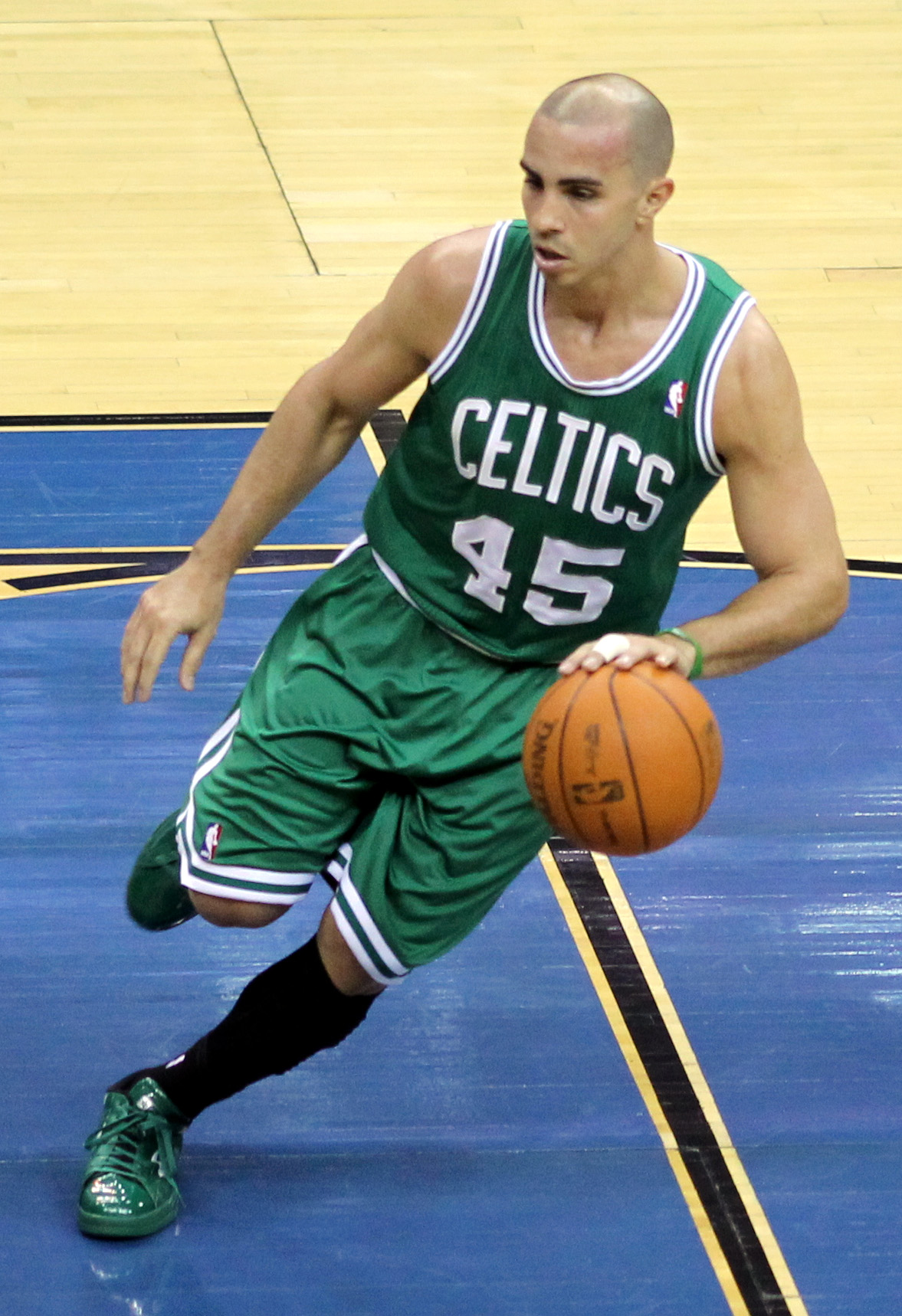
Arroyo with the Boston Celtics in 2011

On March 6, 2011, Arroyo agreed to a contract with the Boston Celtics for the remainder of the season. The contract was for the veteran minimum of $1.2 million. After the news surfaced, Arroyo tweeted on his Twitter account "Embracing this new opportunity in my life... Excited to meet my new teammates!!".

Arroyo debuted with the Celtics on March 9, 2011, in a home game against the Los Angeles Clippers. He contributed with 4 points (2–3 FG), 3 rebounds, 2 assists, and 1 steal in 15 minutes of play. After the game, coach Doc Rivers praised Arroyo's performance, calling it "phenomenal". Rivers was particularly impressed when Arroyo called a play from memory that he hadn't yet run with the team in practice. Celtics veterans Kevin Garnett and Paul Pierce also welcomed Arroyo's contribution to the team. However, after the return of Delonte West from the injured list, Arroyo saw his playing time diminish.

During the first-round playoff series against the New York Knicks, Arroyo remained inactive as Rivers decided to keep Troy Murphy on the active roster because of his size. He was activated for their second-round series against his former team, the Miami Heat. Doc Rivers said "He knows this team... So I thought he may be able to help us in some way." However, Arroyo didn't play in the series and the Celtics were eliminated in five games.

Arroyo's final NBA game was on April 13, 2011, in a 112–102 win over the New York Knicks where he recorded 6 points, 4 assists and 3 rebounds as the Celtics' starting point guard.

=== Return to Europe (2011–2015) ===
==== Beşiktaş Milangaz ====
On December 22, 2011, Arroyo signed a deal with the Turkish club Beşiktaş Milangaz until the end of the 2011–12 season. His first game with the team was on December 31, 2011, against Anadolu Efes S.K. Arroyo scored nine points, with 5 rebounds and three assists in 22 minutes of play, and his team ended up winning 83–76. With only four weeks in Turkey, Arroyo was invited to play in the league All-Star game to be held in January 2012. During the game, he contributed with 13 points, 2 rebounds, and 13 assists. He also scored a last second three-point basket, to lead his team to a 140–139 win.

When the season resumed, Arroyo led his team to win the Turkish Basketball Cup title. He ended up averaging 28.4 minutes, 14 points, and 4.5 assists per game, and a three-point field goal percentage of 47%. After that, he helped his team win the EuroChallenge, while averaging 10.7 points and 3.6 assists per game. In June 2012, Arroyo led his team to win the championship of the Turkish Super League by defeating the Anadolu Efes team in the Turkish League Finals. Arroyo finished the 6th and last game of the Turkish League Finals with 18 points, 5 rebounds, and 8 assists. He was named the Turkish Super League Finals MVP.

==== Galatasaray ====
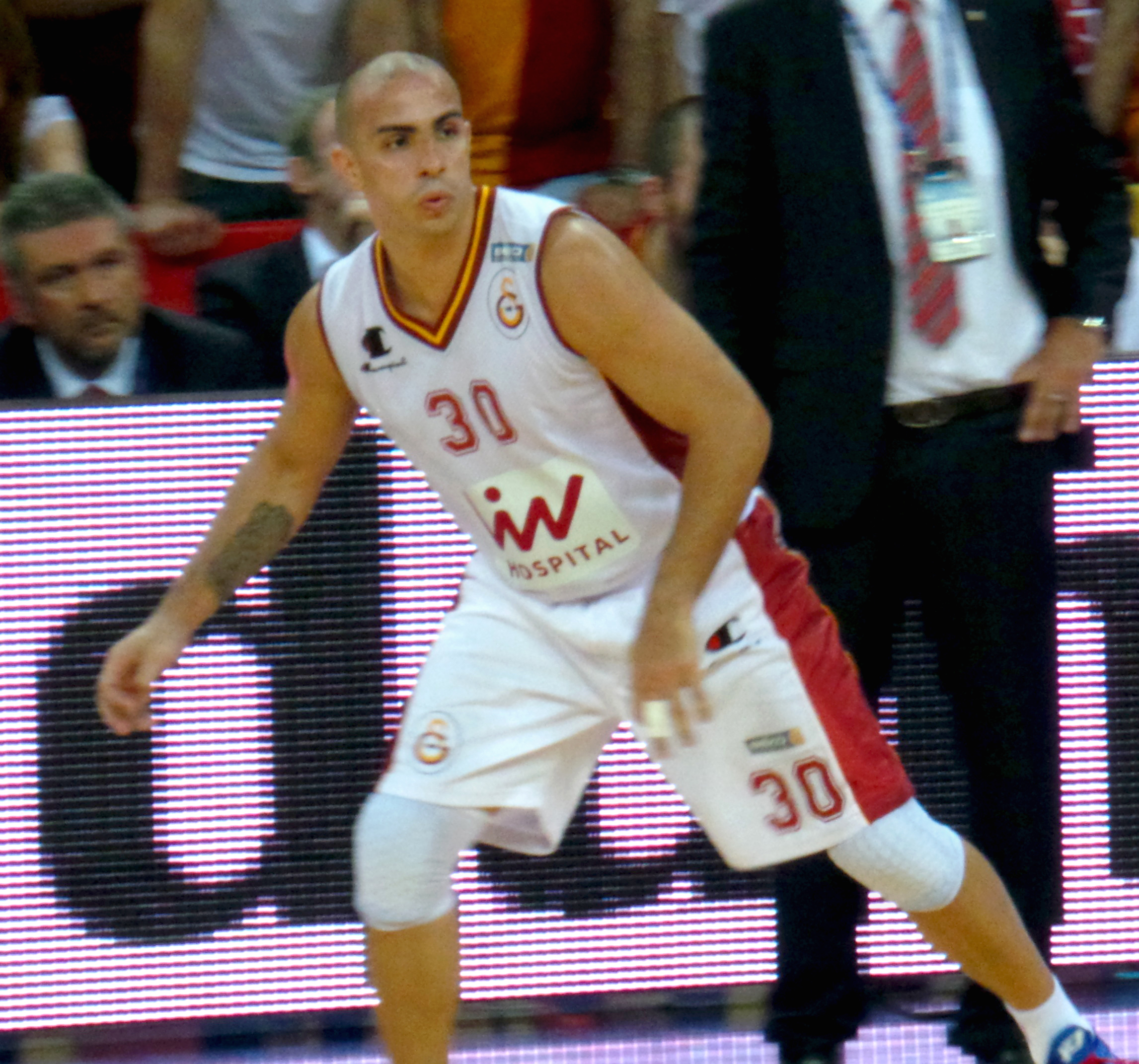
Arroyo with Galatarasaray in 2013

In January 2013, Arroyo signed with Galatasaray Medical Park of the Turkish Basketball Super League (BSL). On February 25, Arroyo scored 15 points and 7 assists on a win against Olin Edirne. On March 16, 2013, he scored 19 points, 3 rebounds, and 6 assists on a win against Mersin BB. On March 26, 2013, Arroyo faced his former team, Beşiktaş, and led Galatasaray to a 76–72 victory. Arroyo was the lead scorer for his team with 17 points, 5 rebounds, and 3 assists.

On June 15, 2013, Arroyo and Galatasaray won the BSL championship after defeating Banvit B.K. 76–58 in the final series. Arroyo scored 15 points and had 8 assists in the game. This was Arroyo's second championship in the BSL, after winning it in 2012 with Beşiktaş. Galatasaray had only lost one game since Arroyo joined the team in January. The next month, Arroyo re-signed with Galatasaray on a one-year deal with the option of a second. In June 2014, Arroyo guided the team to another BSL final, this time against Fenerbahçe Ülker. The series was taken to a seventh and decisive game. He was also selected as team captain for Galatasaray, replacing Ender Arslan.

On August 14, 2014, Galatasaray took up the option on Arroyo's contract, re-signing him for the 2014–15 season. After averaging 15.7 points and 5.1 assists per game during the first half of the season, Arroyo was selected to participate in the All-Star Game of the Turkish Basketball Super League for the European Team. The game was held in January 2015, and Arroyo finished the game with 14 points, 11 rebounds, and 22 assists, leading his team to defeat Team Asia 138–130. At the end of the game, Arroyo was selected Most Valuable Player of the game.

On March 2, 2015, Arroyo parted ways with Galatasaray, due to the unpaid salaries.

=== Return to Puerto Rico (2015) ===
On March 16, he came back to Puerto Rico, to play with the Cangrejeros de Santurce. He averaged 17.4 points in 39 games during the season.

=== Return to Europe (2015–2016) ===
==== FC Barcelona Lassa ====
On July 24, 2015, Arroyo signed a one-year deal with the Spanish club FC Barcelona Lassa.

=== Big 3 ===
On February 11, 2019, it was announced that Carlos Arroyo had joined season 3 of the BIG3.

== National team career ==
Arroyo was considered one of the premier international point guards. During the 2004 Summer Olympics in Athens, Arroyo was the flag-bearer of the delegation and also led the Puerto Rican national team throughout the competition with 18 points per game overall, and led them to a 92–73 victory over the United States, with 25 points, 7 assists, and 4 steals. Arroyo was selected with All-Olympic Team honors.

During the 2006 FIBA World Championship, Arroyo averaged 21.2 points, 4.6 rebounds, and 5.2 assists per game, in five games, for the Puerto Rican team. Arroyo finished tied for fourth in PPG during the 2006 FIBA World Championship with fellow Puerto Rican teammate Larry Ayuso. Arroyo played at the 2008 Olympic Qualifying Tournament, but wasn't able to compete in the semifinals and finals due to a leg injury. At the 2010 CentroBasket, Arroyo was reassigned to the regular shooting guard position, while Barea replaced him as the starting point guard. Puerto Rico won its group, defeating Panama in semifinals, and the Dominican Republic in the final, to win the gold medal. Arroyo had averages of 6.3 assists per game, and led the tournament in points per game with 19.3, earning him inclusion in the tournament's All-Star Team. He was selected the event's Most Valuable Player. Arroyo chose to not play for the team for the 2015 FIBA Americas Championship.

On July 9, 2016, Arroyo announced his retirement as a player from the Puerto Rican national team, after fifteen years of playing with them.

In June 2021 Arroyo was named general manager of the Puerto Rican national team. On July 7, 2024, Puerto Rico qualified for the 2024 Summer Olympics after defeating both Italy in the semifinals and Lithuania in the final of one of four 2024 FIBA Men's Olympic Qualifying Tournaments.

== Career statistics ==
Legend
GP	Games played	GS	Games started	MPG	Minutes per game
FG%	Field-goal percentage	3P%	3-point field-goal percentage	FT%	Free-throw percentage
RPG	Rebounds per game	APG	Assists per game	SPG	Steals per game
BPG	Blocks per game	PPG	Points per game	PIR	Performance index rating
**Bold**	Career high

Correct as of March 2, 2015

=== NBA ===
==== Regular season ====
Year	Team	GP	GS	MPG	FG%	3P%	FT%	RPG	APG	SPG	BPG	PPG
2001–02	Toronto	17	0	5.6	.448	.000	.667	.7	1.2	.4	.0	1.8
2001–02	Denver	20	1	13.8	.439	.000	.750	1.4	2.5	.3	**.1**	4.1
2002–03	Utah	44	0	6.5	.459	.429	.818	.6	1.2	.3	.0	2.8
2003–04	Utah	71	**71**	**28.3**	.441	.325	.804	**2.6**	5.0	**.9**	**.1**	**12.6**
2004–05	Utah	30	16	24.7	.401	.389	.841	1.5	**5.1**	.7	**.1**	8.2
2004–05	Detroit	40	0	17.7	.376	.083	.767	1.5	3.2	.6	.0	5.4
2005–06	Detroit	50	0	12.0	.363	.333	.724	1.4	3.1	.4	**.1**	3.2
2005–06	Orlando	27	0	22.0	**.502**	.357	.810	2.2	2.9	.7	.0	10.8
2006–07	Orlando	**72**	5	18.1	.425	.275	.795	1.9	2.8	.5	.0	7.7
2007–08	Orlando	62	20	20.5	.451	.345	.853	1.8	3.5	.4	.0	6.9
2009–10	Miami	**72**	35	22.0	.475	.280	.844	1.8	3.1	.5	.1	6.1
2010–11	Miami	49	42	20.2	.458	.438	.800	1.6	2.0	.3	.0	5.6
2010–11	Boston	15	1	12.7	.314	**.600**	**.917**	1.5	1.7	.5	.0	2.4
Career		569	191	18.7	.438	.338	.806	1.7	3.1	.5	.0	6.6

==== Playoffs ====
Year	Team	GP	GS	MPG	FG%	3P%	FT%	RPG	APG	SPG	BPG	PPG
2003	Utah	3	0	9.0	.333	.000	.750	.7	1.7	.0	.0	3.0
2005	Detroit	**19**	0	7.9	.356	.000	.667	.5	2.1	.2	**.1**	2.1
2007	Orlando	3	0	13.3	.357	.000	**1.000**	1.7	2.0	.3	.0	4.0
2008	Orlando	4	0	7.5	**.500**	.000	**1.000**	.5	1.0	.0	.0	1.5
2010	Miami	5	**5**	**23.0**	.462	.000	**1.000**	**1.8**	**2.2**	**.6**	.0	**5.2**
Career		34	5	10.6	.388	.000	.773	.8	1.9	.2	.1	2.7

=== EuroLeague ===
Year	Team	GP	GS	MPG	FG%	3P%	FT%	RPG	APG	SPG	BPG	PPG	PIR
2001–02	Tau Ceramica	3	0	15.1	**.550**	.200	**1.000**	1.0	2.3	.3	.0	9.7	8.7
2008–09	Maccabi	15	15	**33.6**	.393	.293	.867	**2.7**	4.1	**1.3**	**.1**	**14.6**	13.0
2013–14	Galatasaray	**25**	**25**	31.7	.418	.346	.855	2.0	**5.5**	.4	.0	13.7	**13.5**
2014–15	Galatasaray	15	15	29.5	.384	.346	.824	1.7	4.3	.5	.0	12.5	9.7
2015–16	Barcelona	22	2	15.8	.373	**.413**	.826	1.6	2.4	.5	.0	6.0	4.4
Career		80	57	26.6	.401	.347	.854	2.0	4.0	.7	.0	11.4	10.0

=== Domestic leagues ===
Season	Team	League	GP	MPG	FG%	3P%	FT%	RPG	APG	SPG	BPG	PPG
1996	Cariduros de Fajardo	BSN	34	?	.520	.270	.710	1.9	3.3	?	?	10.9
1997	Cariduros de Fajardo	BSN	32	?	.500	.420	.690	3.3	5.5	?	?	17.0
1998	Cangrejeros de Santurce	BSN	29	?	.590	.290	.520	2.2	3.4	?	?	8.4
1999	Cangrejeros de Santurce	BSN	30	?	.520	.340	.740	3.1	5.6	?	?	15.2
2000	Cangrejeros de Santurce	BSN	28	?	.550	.380	.660	3.8	3.9	?	?	17.1
2001	Cangrejeros de Santurce	BSN	8	?	.570	.320	.700	2.9	6.0	?	?	20.5
2001–02	TAU Cerámica	ACB	4	8.0	.333	.333	.909	.5	1.0	1.0	.0	4.3
2002	Cangrejeros de Santurce	BSN	10	?	.640	.430	.780	4.1	8.4	?	?	20.0
2002–03	played in NBA											
2003–04	played in NBA											
2004–05	played in NBA											
2005–06	played in NBA											
2006–07	played in NBA											
2007–08	played in NBA											
2008–09	Maccabi Tel Aviv B.C.	ISBL	28	31.1	.516	.453	.818	3.7	5.8	1.3	.1	15.3
2009–10	played in NBA											
2010–11	played in NBA											
2011–12	Beşiktaş Milangaz	BSL	27	31.2	.395	.437	.854	2.5	4.4	.7	.0	14.4
2012–13	Galatasaray	BSL	27	28.4	.464	.427	.775	2.9	4.3	.7	.0	13.3
2013–14	Galatasaray	BSL	38	28.8	.429	.355	.853	2.0	4.8	.7	.0	12.2
2014–15	Galatasaray	BSL	17	30.1	.443	.417	.944	1.8	5.0	.5	.0	15.5
2015	Cangrejeros de Santurce	BSN	39	32.0	.474	.377	.771	3.1	6.5	.7	.1	17.4

== Musical career ==
Interested in reggaeton, Carlos Arroyo established his own studio and independent record label called Arroyo Hit Music and launched a mini-musical career in 2009. He has released two singles so far, "Oculto Secreto" in 2009 and "Se Va Conmigo" in 2010. The latter features fellow Puerto Rican artist Yomo. Later after releasing his hit single with Reggaeton singer Yomo, he decided to work on the remix which features the "Queen of Reggaeton" Ivy Queen. The original version with Yomo peaked at #45 on the Billboard Latin Digital Songs chart, #26 on the Billboard Latin Rhythm Airplay chart, and #13 on the Billboard Latin Rhythm Digital Songs chart.

Carlos Arroyo also had his own theme music accompaniment at American Airlines Arena, namely El Gran Combo's "Fiesta de Pilito". Arroyo collaborated with Probably Pablo on the song "Imaginarme".

In March 2020, Arroyo released the single "Baila Reggaeton", featuring the popular duo Zion & Lennox; the song became an international hit, and Arroyo quickly became "one of the biggest reggaeton stars in the world".

== Personal life ==
After finishing his studies in Florida International University (FIU), Arroyo established his residence in Florida, since it is the closest location to Puerto Rico within the United States, where he works. It was there that he met his wife, Xiomara Escobar, with whom he has three children, Gabriella (b. 2005), Daniela (b. 2010), and Carlos Adrián (b. 2012). On November 2, 2007, Arroyo was forced to miss two games with the Orlando Magic when he had to make an emergency visit to Puerto Rico because his daughter was suffering from pneumonia. Arroyo's grandmother was a cancer patient which motivated him to participate in activities directed towards children suffering from the condition. His eldest daughter Gabriella committed to the University of Dayton volleyball team in the NCAA Division I in 2022.

== Discography ==
=== Singles ===
- 2009: "Oculto Secreto"
- 2010: "Se Va Conmigo" (feat. Yomo)
- 2010: "Se Va Conmigo" (Remix) (Feat. Ivy Queen)
- 2011: "Bailemos En La Luna"
- 2011: "Imaginarme" (Probably Pablo feat. Carlos Arroyo)
- 2011: "Estamos Ready" (Ali feat. Carlos Arroyo)
- 2020: "Bailamos Reggaetón" (feat. (Zion & Lennox)
- 2020: "Aruba" (feat. (Farruko)
- 2020: "Heroe" (feat. (Rauw Alejandro)

== See also ==
- List of Puerto Ricans
- Puerto Rico at the 2004 Summer Olympics
- Puerto Rico national basketball team
