= 2002–03 Utah Jazz season =

NBA professional basketball team season

- Head coach: Jerry Sloan
- General manager: Kevin O'Connor
- Owner: Larry H. Miller
- Arena: Delta Center

Results
- Record: 47–35 (.573)
- Place: Division: 4th (Midwest); Conference: 7th (Western)
- Playoff finish: First round (lost to Kings 1–4)
- Stats at Basketball Reference

Local media
- Television: KJZZ-TV; Fox Sports Net Utah
- Radio: KFNZ / KBEE

The 2002–03 Utah Jazz season was the 29th season for the Utah Jazz in the National Basketball Association, and their 24th season in Salt Lake City, Utah.

== Season summary ==
=== Off-season ===
During the off-season, the Jazz signed free agents Matt Harpring, Calbert Cheaney, Mark Jackson and Tony Massenburg.

=== Regular season ===
With the addition of Harpring, Cheaney and Jackson, the Jazz struggled losing seven of their first ten games of the regular season, but then posted a six-game winning streak afterwards, and later on held a 29–20 record at the All-Star break. The team posted another six-game winning streak in March, but lost five of their final seven games of the season. The Jazz finished in third place in the Midwest Division with a 47–35 record, and earned the seventh seed in the Western Conference; the team qualified for the NBA playoffs for the 20th consecutive year.

Karl Malone averaged 20.6 points, 7.8 rebounds, 4.7 assists and 1.7 steals per game, while Harpring averaged 17.6 points and 6.6 rebounds per game, second-year forward Andrei Kirilenko provided the team with 12.0 points, 5.3 rebounds, 1.5 steals and 2.2 blocks per game off the bench, and John Stockton provided with 10.8 points, 7.7 assists and 1.7 steals per game. In addition, Cheaney contributed 8.6 points per game, while Scott Padgett averaged 5.7 points and 3.3 rebounds per game, and second-year center Jarron Collins contributed 5.5 points per game, but only played just 22 games due to injury. Meanwhile, Greg Ostertag provided with 5.4 points, 6.2 rebounds and 1.8 blocks per game, Jackson contributed 4.7 points and 4.6 assists per game, and Massenburg averaged 4.7 points per game.

During the NBA All-Star weekend at the Philips Arena in Atlanta, Georgia, Kirilenko was selected for the NBA Rookie Challenge Game, as a member of the Sophomores team. Harpring finished in second place in Most Improved Player voting, behind Gilbert Arenas of the Golden State Warriors, while Kirilenko finished tied in 14th place; Kirilenko also finished in third place in Sixth Man of the Year voting, and head coach Jerry Sloan finished in third place in Coach of the Year voting.

The Jazz finished seventh in the NBA in home-game attendance, with an attendance of 786,034 at the Delta Center during the regular season.

=== NBA playoffs ===
In the Western Conference First Round of the 2003 NBA playoffs, and for the second consecutive year, the Jazz faced off against the 2nd–seeded, and Pacific Division champion Sacramento Kings, who were led by the trio of All-Star forward Chris Webber, All-Star forward Peja Stojaković, and Mike Bibby. The Jazz lost the first two games to the Kings on the road at the ARCO Arena II, but managed to win Game 3 at home, 107–104 at the Delta Center. However, the Jazz lost the next two games, which included a Game 5 loss to the Kings at the ARCO Arena II, 111–91, thus losing the series in five games.

=== Aftermath ===
This season also marked the end of the Stockton and Malone era; Stockton and Malone were both given a long standing ovation after Game 4 of the first-round series against the Kings at the Delta Center, and another one after Game 5 at the ARCO Arena II, as Stockton retired ending his nineteen-year NBA career with the Jazz. Following the season, Malone signed as a free agent with the Los Angeles Lakers after eighteen seasons with the Jazz, while Cheaney signed with the Golden State Warriors, and Jackson and Massenburg were both released to free agency.

The Jazz would not return to the NBA playoffs again until the 2006–07 season, as the team's postseason streak would come to an end in the following season with a 42–40 record, which was above .500 in winning percentage, but the team failed to qualify for the playoffs.

== Draft picks ==
| Round | Pick | Player | Position | Nationality | College |
|---|---|---|---|---|---|
| 1 | 19 | Ryan Humphrey | PF | United States | Notre Dame |
| 2 | 46 | Jamal Sampson | C | United States | California |

== Roster ==
2002–03 Utah Jazz roster
Players

| Pos. | No. | Player | Height | Weight | DOB | From |
|---|---|---|---|---|---|---|
| F/C | 26 | John Amaechi | 6 ft 10 in (2.08 m) | 270 lb (122 kg) | 1970–11–26 | Penn State |
| G | 30 | Carlos Arroyo | 6 ft 2 in (1.88 m) | 200 lb (91 kg) | 1979–07–30 | FIU |
| C | 22 | Curtis Borchardt (injured) (IN) | 7 ft 0 in (2.13 m) | 240 lb (109 kg) | 1980–09–13 | Stanford |
| G/F | 40 | Calbert Cheaney | 6 ft 7 in (2.01 m) | 209 lb (95 kg) | 1971–07–17 | Indiana |
| C | 31 | Jarron Collins (injured) | 6 ft 11 in (2.11 m) | 230 lb (104 kg) | 1978–12–02 | Stanford |
| G/F | 15 | Matt Harpring | 6 ft 7 in (2.01 m) | 230 lb (104 kg) | 1976–05–31 | Georgia Tech |
| G | 13 | Mark Jackson | 6 ft 1 in (1.85 m) | 180 lb (82 kg) | 1965–04–01 | St. John's |
| F | 47 | Andrei Kirilenko | 6 ft 9 in (2.06 m) | 220 lb (100 kg) | 1981–02–18 | Russia |
| PG | 24 | Raül López (injured) (IN) | 6 ft 0 in (1.83 m) | 185 lb (84 kg) | 1980–04–15 | Spain |
| F | 32 | Karl Malone | 6 ft 9 in (2.06 m) | 256 lb (116 kg) | 1963–07–24 | Louisiana Tech |
| F/C | 44 | Tony Massenburg | 6 ft 9 in (2.06 m) | 220 lb (100 kg) | 1967–07–31 | Maryland |
| C | 00 | Greg Ostertag | 7 ft 2 in (2.18 m) | 280 lb (127 kg) | 1973–03–06 | Kansas |
| F | 34 | Scott Padgett | 6 ft 9 in (2.06 m) | 240 lb (109 kg) | 1976–04–19 | Kentucky |
| G/F | 2 | DeShawn Stevenson | 6 ft 5 in (1.96 m) | 218 lb (99 kg) | 1981–04–03 | Washington Union HS (CA) |
| G | 12 | John Stockton | 6 ft 1 in (1.85 m) | 175 lb (79 kg) | 1962–03–26 | Gonzaga |

Coaches
Head coach
- Jerry Sloan
Assistant(s)
- Gordon Chiesa
- David Fredman
- Phil Johnson
- Kenny Natt
- Mark McKown (player development)

Legend
- (DP) Unsigned draft pick
- (FA) Free agent
- (S) Suspended
- Injured

Roster

== Preseason ==
=== Game log ===
2002 pre-season game log
Pre-season: 4–4 (home: 1–1; road: 3–3)

| Game | Date | Team | Score | High points | High rebounds | High assists | Location Attendance | Record |
|---|---|---|---|---|---|---|---|---|
| 1 | October 6 | @ Seattle | 89 – 82 | | | | KeyArena; 9,264 | 1–0 |
| 2 | October 8 | @ Portland | 93 – 80 | | | | Rose Garden Arena; 13,672 | 1–1 |
| 3 | October 10 | @ Sacramento | 102 – 92 | | | | ARCO Arena; 11,280 | 1–2 |
| 4 | October 15 | NY Knicks | 89 – 83 | | | | Delta Center; 14,921 | 1–3 |
| 5 | October 18 | @ Cleveland | 95 – 91 | | | | Gund Arena; 5,114 | 1–4 |
| 6 | October 19 | @ Philadelphia | 107 – 99 | | | | First Union Center; 17,178 | 2–4 |
| 7 | October 22 | @ NY Knicks | 94 – 89 | | | | Madison Square Garden; 14,000 | 3–4 |
| 8 | October 24 | Toronto | 89 – 82 | | | | Delta Center; 14,133 | 4–4 |

2002–03 season schedule

== Regular season ==
=== Season standings ===
| Midwest Division | W | L | PCT | GB | Home | Road | Div |
|---|---|---|---|---|---|---|---|
| y-San Antonio Spurs | 60 | 22 | .732 | – | 33–8 | 27–14 | 17–7 |
| x-Dallas Mavericks | 60 | 22 | .732 | – | 33–8 | 27–14 | 18–6 |
| x-Minnesota Timberwolves | 51 | 31 | .622 | 9 | 33–8 | 18–23 | 15–9 |
| x-Utah Jazz | 47 | 35 | .573 | 13 | 29–12 | 18–23 | 15–9 |
| e-Houston Rockets | 43 | 39 | .524 | 17 | 28–13 | 15–26 | 11–13 |
| e-Memphis Grizzlies | 28 | 54 | .341 | 32 | 20–21 | 8–33 | 5–17 |
| e-Denver Nuggets | 17 | 65 | .207 | 43 | 13–28 | 4–37 | 3–21 |

| # | Western Conference | | | | |
| # | Team | W | L | PCT | GB |
|---|---|---|---|---|---|
| 1 | z-San Antonio Spurs | 60 | 22 | .732 | – |
| 2 | y-Sacramento Kings | 59 | 23 | .720 | 1 |
| 3 | x-Dallas Mavericks | 60 | 22 | .732 | – |
| 4 | x-Minnesota Timberwolves | 51 | 31 | .622 | 9 |
| 5 | x-Los Angeles Lakers | 50 | 32 | .610 | 10 |
| 6 | x-Portland Trail Blazers | 50 | 32 | .610 | 10 |
| 7 | x-Utah Jazz | 47 | 35 | .573 | 13 |
| 8 | x-Phoenix Suns | 44 | 38 | .537 | 16 |
| 9 | e-Houston Rockets | 43 | 39 | .524 | 17 |
| 10 | e-Seattle SuperSonics | 40 | 42 | .488 | 20 |
| 11 | e-Golden State Warriors | 38 | 44 | .463 | 22 |
| 12 | e-Memphis Grizzlies | 28 | 54 | .341 | 32 |
| 13 | e-Los Angeles Clippers | 27 | 55 | .329 | 33 |
| 14 | e-Denver Nuggets | 17 | 65 | .207 | 43 |

== Playoffs ==
2003 playoff game log
First round: 1–4 (home: 1–1; road: 0–3)

| Game | Date | Team | Score | High points | High rebounds | High assists | Location Attendance | Series |
|---|---|---|---|---|---|---|---|---|
| 1 | April 19 | @ Sacramento | L 90–96 | Karl Malone (25) | Greg Ostertag (11) | Karl Malone (8) | ARCO Arena; 17,317 | 0–1 |
| 2 | April 21 | @ Sacramento | L 95–108 | Andrei Kirilenko (17) | Matt Harpring (8) | Mark Jackson (4) | ARCO Arena; 17,317 | 0–2 |
| 3 | April 26 | Sacramento | W 107–104 | Greg Ostertag (22) | Greg Ostertag (12) | John Stockton (7) | Delta Center; 19,911 | 1–2 |
| 4 | April 28 | Sacramento | L 82–99 | Karl Malone (24) | Greg Ostertag (14) | John Stockton (7) | Delta Center; 19,911 | 1–3 |
| 5 | April 30 | @ Sacramento | L 91–111 | Harpring, Padgett (16) | Scott Padgett (6) | John Stockton (7) | ARCO Arena; 17,317 | 1–4 |

2003 schedule

== Player statistics ==
Legend
| GP | Games played | GS | Games started | MPG | Minutes per game |
| FG% | Field-goal percentage | 3P% | 3-point field-goal percentage | FT% | Free-throw percentage |
| RPG | Rebounds per game | APG | Assists per game | SPG | Steals per game |
| BPG | Blocks per game | PPG | Points per game |

=== Season ===
| Player | GP | GS | MPG | FG% | 3FG% | FT% | RPG | APG | SPG | BPG | PPG |
|---|---|---|---|---|---|---|---|---|---|---|---|
| John Amaechi | 50 | 1 | 9.5 | .314 | | .481 | 1.5 | .4 | .3 | .1 | 2.0 |
| Carlos Arroyo | 44 | 0 | 6.5 | .459 | .429 | .818 | .6 | 1.2 | .3 | .0 | 2.8 |
| Calbert Cheaney | 81 | 74 | 29.0 | .499 | .400 | .580 | 3.5 | 2.0 | .8 | .2 | 8.6 |
| Jarron Collins | 22 | 7 | 19.1 | .442 | .000 | .710 | 2.7 | .6 | .2 | .3 | 5.5 |
| Matt Harpring | 78 | 69 | 32.8 | .511 | .413 | .792 | 6.6 | 1.7 | .9 | .2 | 17.6 |
| Mark Jackson | 82 | 0 | 17.9 | .398 | .284 | .763 | 2.1 | 4.6 | .6 | .0 | 4.7 |
| Andrei Kirilenko | 80 | 11 | 27.7 | .491 | .325 | .800 | 5.3 | 1.7 | 1.5 | 2.2 | 12.0 |
| Karl Malone | 81 | 81 | 36.2 | .462 | .214 | .763 | 7.8 | 4.7 | 1.7 | .4 | 20.6 |
| Tony Massenburg | 58 | 1 | 13.7 | .448 | | .774 | 2.7 | .3 | .3 | .3 | 4.7 |
| Greg Ostertag | 81 | 74 | 23.8 | .518 | | .510 | 6.2 | .7 | .2 | 1.8 | 5.4 |
| Scott Padgett | 82 | 2 | 16.1 | .402 | .338 | .757 | 3.3 | 1.0 | .5 | .3 | 5.7 |
| DeShawn Stevenson | 61 | 8 | 12.5 | .401 | .333 | .691 | 1.4 | .7 | .4 | .1 | 4.6 |
| John Stockton | 82 | 82 | 27.7 | .483 | .363 | .826 | 2.5 | 7.7 | 1.7 | .2 | 10.8 |

=== Playoffs ===
| Player | GP | GS | MPG | FG% | 3FG% | FT% | RPG | APG | SPG | BPG | PPG |
|---|---|---|---|---|---|---|---|---|---|---|---|
| John Amaechi | 2 | 0 | 8.0 | .250 | | .500 | .5 | .0 | .0 | .0 | 2.0 |
| Carlos Arroyo | 3 | 0 | 9.0 | .333 | | .750 | .7 | 1.7 | .0 | .0 | 3.0 |
| Calbert Cheaney | 5 | 5 | 24.4 | .370 | | .500 | 1.4 | 1.6 | .4 | .2 | 4.4 |
| Matt Harpring | 5 | 5 | 31.2 | .484 | .143 | .813 | 5.4 | 1.0 | 1.0 | .2 | 14.8 |
| Mark Jackson | 5 | 0 | 16.6 | .500 | .556 | 1.000 | 1.0 | 3.2 | .6 | .0 | 7.2 |
| Andrei Kirilenko | 5 | 0 | 29.0 | .419 | .143 | .875 | 4.8 | 1.4 | .6 | 2.0 | 11.6 |
| Karl Malone | 5 | 5 | 38.2 | .405 | .000 | .732 | 6.8 | 4.0 | 1.6 | .4 | 19.6 |
| Tony Massenburg | 5 | 0 | 14.0 | .476 | | .556 | 4.2 | .4 | .0 | .8 | 5.0 |
| Greg Ostertag | 5 | 5 | 30.2 | .444 | | .737 | 8.6 | 1.6 | .6 | 1.8 | 9.2 |
| Scott Padgett | 4 | 0 | 13.3 | .421 | .286 | .500 | 2.3 | 1.0 | .8 | .0 | 4.8 |
| DeShawn Stevenson | 4 | 0 | 9.3 | .400 | .000 | 1.000 | 1.8 | 1.0 | .3 | .0 | 4.5 |
| John Stockton | 5 | 5 | 29.8 | .462 | .000 | 1.000 | 3.2 | 5.2 | 1.6 | .2 | 11.2 |

Player statistics citation:

== Transactions ==
=== Overview ===
Players Added

Via draft

Via trade

Via free agency

- Calbert Cheaney
- Matt Harpring
- Mark Jackson
- Tony Massenburg
Players Lost

Via trade

Via free agency

- John Crotty
- Rusty LaRue
- Bryon Russell

Player Transactions Citation:
