= Memorial Day Miracle =

Sean Elliot's 1999 game-winning shot in Game 2 of the 1999 Western Conference Finals

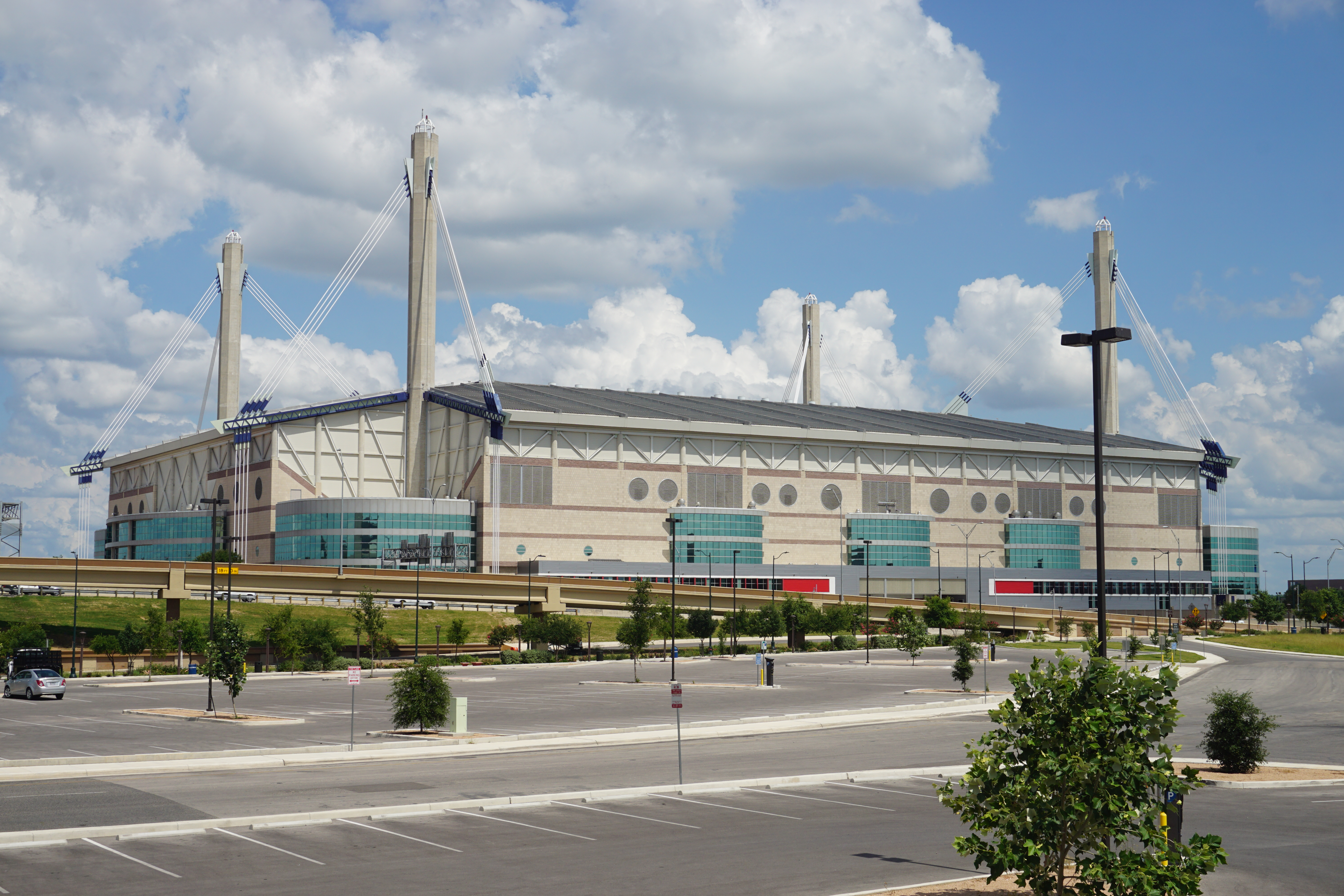
- Exterior of the Alamodome in May 2018.
Portland Trail Blazers	San Antonio Spurs
85	86
Head coach: Mike Dunleavy	Head coach: Gregg Popovich
	1	2	3	4	Total
Portland Trail Blazers	31	17	19	18	85
San Antonio Spurs	20	14	26	26	86
- Date: May 31, 1999
- Venue: Alamodome, San Antonio, Texas
- Referees: Dan Crawford; Bob Delaney; Ron Garretson
- Attendance: 35,260

The Memorial Day Miracle was a game-winning three-point field goal by Sean Elliott in Game 2 of the 1999 Western Conference Finals between the Portland Trail Blazers and the San Antonio Spurs at the Alamodome in San Antonio, Texas, on May 31, 1999, Memorial Day. The shot helped the Spurs move on to their first NBA Finals appearance, while this was the first of two consecutive heartbreaking Conference Finals appearances for the Trail Blazers.

== The play ==
Damon Stoudamire of the Trail Blazers was fouled with 12 seconds left in the fourth quarter. He hit one of two free throws to make the Trail Blazers' lead a score of 85–83. The Spurs called a timeout to advance the ball to half-court. After the timeout, Spurs guard Mario Elie inbounded the ball past a diving Stacey Augmon to forward Sean Elliott.

Elliott caught the inbounds pass near the sideline. He stayed on his toes while turning to shoot a three-pointer, careful not to set his heels down out of bounds which would have caused a turnover. With Rasheed Wallace running at him trying to block the shot, Elliott arched the ball over Wallace's outstretched hand and into the basket with nine seconds left to give the Spurs an 86–85 lead. Portland failed to score in the remaining time, and the Spurs, who had trailed for the entire game prior to Elliott's basket, celebrated on the court.

The game was broadcast on NBC as part of its NBA on NBC branding. The call was announced by Bob Costas:

"Elie will throw it in... into Sean Elliott. He fires the three... and hits it!"

== Significance ==
The "Miracle" designation relates to the combination of circumstances involved:

1. As revealed after the Spurs' championship run, Elliott had been playing with focal segmental glomerulosclerosis, which would require a kidney transplant, and he would likely have not been involved in the game had he gone through with the transplant procedure sooner.
2. The Spurs trailed by 18 (52–34) early in the third quarter and had not led prior to Elliott's shot.
3. The Spurs' last play succeeded despite a near steal by Stacey Augmon, near block by Wallace, and near turnover by Elliott, who managed to have his feet avoid touching the out-of-bounds line.
4. Portland still had nine seconds to make a shot that would have given them the lead but Walt Williams could not get his fadeaway shot to land in before San Antonio recovered the ball.

== Aftermath ==
The Spurs won the next two games in Portland for a four-game sweep to win their first-ever conference title, after having lost four conference championship series since joining the NBA. In the 1999 NBA Finals, they beat the New York Knicks in five games to win their first NBA title. The Spurs would compete in the Western Conference Finals in nine out of the next 18 years and make it to the NBA Finals five more times, winning all but once to spark a dynasty. Portland would appear in the Western Conference Finals the following year, but would run into another team keen on building a legacy in the Los Angeles Lakers. The Lakers would beat them in seven games, and Portland did not win another playoff series again until 2014 and did not make another appearance in the Conference Finals until 2019.
