= Matt Harpring =

American basketball player (born 1976)

Personal information
- Born: May 31, 1976 (age 50) Cincinnati, Ohio, U.S.
- Listed height: 6 ft 7 in (2.01 m)
- Listed weight: 230 lb (104 kg)

Career information
- High school: Marist School (Atlanta, Georgia)
- College: Georgia Tech (1994–1998)
- NBA draft: 1998: 1st round, 15th overall pick
- Drafted by: Orlando Magic
- Playing career: 1998–2009
- Position: Small forward / shooting guard
- Number: 15, 21

Career history
- 1998–2000: Orlando Magic
- 2000–2001: Cleveland Cavaliers
- 2001–2002: Philadelphia 76ers
- 2002–2009: Utah Jazz

Career highlights
- NBA All-Rookie First Team (1999); Second-team All-American – USBWA, NABC (1998); Third-team All-American – AP (1998); 3× First-team All-ACC (1996–1998); No. 15 retired by Georgia Tech Yellow Jackets; Mr. Georgia Basketball (1993)

Career NBA statistics
- Points: 7,645 (11.5 ppg)
- Rebounds: 3,366 (5.1 rpg)
- Assists: 907 (1.4 apg)
- Stats at NBA.com
- Stats at Basketball Reference

Matthew Joseph Harpring (born May 31, 1976) is an American former professional basketball player who played 11 seasons in the National Basketball Association (NBA) and was formerly paired with play-by-play broadcaster Craig Bolerjack as the color analyst in broadcasting games for the Utah Jazz.

== College career ==
After attending Marist School near Atlanta, Harpring played college basketball at Georgia Tech, where he was a four-year starter. He was named First Team All-ACC three times (the only other Yellow Jacket player to accomplish this feat was Mark Price from 1984 to 1986). In his senior season (1997–98), Harpring set career-highs by averaging 21.6 points and 9.4 rebounds per game, ranking second in the ACC in both categories. For his efforts, he was named Third Team All-American.

He finished his collegiate career as Georgia Tech's second all-time leader in points (2,225) and rebounds (997). He is the institute's all-time leader in free throws attempted (675) and made (508). Prior to his final regular season home game, Georgia Tech retired Harpring's jersey number 15. In 2002, Harpring was selected to the ACC 50th Anniversary men's basketball team as one of the fifty greatest players in Atlantic Coast Conference history.

While he excelled on the court, he was equally impressive in the classroom. Harpring earned a bachelor's degree in business management from Georgia Tech, and was named GTE Academic All-District III three times. As a senior, he was an Academic All-American.

== Professional career ==
=== Early NBA years ===
The Orlando Magic selected Harpring with the 15th pick in the first round of the 1998 NBA draft. In his rookie season, he averaged 8.2 points and 4.3 rebounds per game. He started 22 of 50 games, averaging 10.5 points and 5.5 rebounds as a starter. He was named to the 1998–99 NBA All-Rookie First Team.

In his second year with the Magic, Harpring played in just four games. An injury to his left ankle sidelined him for most of the season. In August 2000, he was traded to the Cleveland Cavaliers for center Andrew DeClercq. He played just one season with the Cavs, averaging 11.1 points and 4.3 rebounds in 56 games. He scored a career-high 28 points against Charlotte on March 16, 2001.

In August 2001, the Cavs traded Harpring to the Philadelphia 76ers along with Cedric Henderson and Robert Traylor in exchange for Tyrone Hill and Jumaine Jones. Harpring played in 81 games for the Sixers during the 2001–02 season. He set career highs in points, rebounds, assists, steals, and blocks. For the year, he averaged 11.8 points and 7.1 rebounds per game. He scored 20 or more points in five different games.

=== Utah Jazz ===
Harpring signed a free agent contract with the Utah Jazz in August 2002. Known as a smart, hard-working player, he fit well in Utah's offensive system, playing alongside superstars Karl Malone and John Stockton. Harpring played the best basketball of his career, averaging 17.6 points per game while shooting 51.1 percent from the floor and 41.3 percent on three-pointers. He set a new career high with 30 points against the Los Angeles Clippers on November 26, 2002. Three nights later, he set another career high with 33 points against the Minnesota Timberwolves (on November 29, 2002). He finished second in voting for the NBA's Most Improved Player in 2002–03 (behind Golden State's Gilbert Arenas).

Prior to the 2003–04 season, Stockton announced his retirement and Malone left Utah to play for the Los Angeles Lakers. Harpring was named team captain by coach Jerry Sloan. Harpring provided leadership for the young team, which played surprisingly well despite the departures of Malone and Stockton. Harpring's season ended suddenly with a knee injury that required surgery to repair. In 31 games, he averaged 16.2 points and 8.0 rebounds per game. At the time of his injury, he was Utah's leading scorer.

Harpring returned from his injury the following season, but saw his role on the team reduced as Andrei Kirilenko emerged as an All-Star at small forward, and the Jazz added power forwards Carlos Boozer and Mehmet Okur to the roster.

In 2009, after suffering various injuries and a post-surgery infection in his ankle, Harpring announced that he would probably not be able to continue playing in the NBA, though he did not formally retire.

=== End of playing career ===
On December 22, 2009, Harpring's contract was included in a trade between the Jazz and the Oklahoma City Thunder. Harpring and point guard Eric Maynor were traded to the Thunder in exchange for the rights to 2002 draft pick Peter Fehse. Harpring did not report to Oklahoma City, who waived him on February 22, 2010.

== Broadcasting career ==
Harpring became a color commentary voice for basketball games broadcast on AT&T SportsNet Rocky Mountain, adding a dry sense of humor which he admits he suppressed while playing.

== Awards and honors ==
- NBA All-Rookie First Team: 1999

Harpring was inducted into the Georgia Sports Hall of Fame, in Macon, Georgia, as a member of the 2017 class.

== NBA career statistics ==
Legend
GP	Games played	GS	Games started	MPG	Minutes per game
FG%	Field goal percentage	3P%	3-point field goal percentage	FT%	Free throw percentage
RPG	Rebounds per game	APG	Assists per game	SPG	Steals per game
BPG	Blocks per game	PPG	Points per game	**Bold**	Career high
*	Led the league

=== Regular season ===
Year	Team	GP	GS	MPG	FG%	3P%	FT%	RPG	APG	SPG	BPG	PPG
1998–99	Orlando	50*	22	22.3	.463	.400	.713	4.3	.9	.6	.1	8.2
1999–00	Orlando	4	0	15.8	.235	**1.000**	**.857**	3.0	**2.0**	**1.3**	**.3**	4.0
2000–01	Cleveland	56	55	28.8	.454	.250	.812	4.3	1.8	.8	**.3**	11.1
2001–02	Philadelphia	**81**	**81**	31.4	.461	.304	.743	7.1	1.3	.9	.1	11.8
2002–03	Utah	78	69	32.8	**.511**	.413	.792	6.6	1.7	.9	.2	**17.6**
2003–04	Utah	31	31	**36.6**	.471	.242	.688	**8.0**	**2.0**	.7	.1	16.2
2004–05	Utah	78	55	33.1	.489	.209	.778	6.2	1.8	.9	.2	14.0
2005–06	Utah	71	32	27.4	.475	.359	.725	5.2	1.4	.8	.2	12.5
2006–07	Utah	77	2	25.5	.491	.333	.767	4.6	1.3	.7	.1	11.6
2007–08	Utah	76	0	18.1	.500	.200	.712	3.2	1.1	.6	.2	8.2
2008–09	Utah	63	2	11.0	.461	.000	.764	2.0	.4	.5	.1	4.4
Career		665	349	26.4	.481	.333	.753	5.1	1.4	.7	.2	11.5

=== Playoffs ===
Year	Team	GP	GS	MPG	FG%	3P%	FT%	RPG	APG	SPG	BPG	PPG
1999	Orlando	4	0	20.5	.462	.200	.727	5.0	**1.8**	.3	.0	8.3
2002	Philadelphia	5	**5**	23.8	**.500**	.000	.778	5.2	1.4	**1.0**	.0	10.2
2003	Utah	5	**5**	**31.2**	.484	.143	.813	**5.4**	1.0	**1.0**	.2	**14.8**
2007	Utah	**17**	0	25.5	.456	.000	.723	4.8	1.4	.4	.2	9.3
2008	Utah	12	0	17.4	.397	**.333**	.800	2.8	.7	.6	**.3**	6.6
2009	Utah	5	0	9.8	**.500**	.000	**1.000**	1.8	.8	.4	.2	4.8
Career		48	10	21.8	.459	.150	.767	4.1	1.1	.6	.2	8.7

== Career highs ==
- Points – 33 vs. Minnesota Timberwolves, November 29, 2002
- Rebounds – 19 vs. Orlando Magic, November 17, 2003
- Assists – 7 vs. Charlotte Hornets, March 16, 2001
- Steals – 4 on 6 occasions
- Blocks – 3 on 2 occasions
- Minutes – 49 vs. Sacramento Kings, November 1, 2000

== Personal life ==
Harpring and his wife Amanda, a physician, have five children. His eldest son, Luke, plays football at Florida after transferring from Harpring's alma mater, Georgia Tech. His daughter Kate Harpring plays basketball for the University of North Carolina as of the 2026-2027 season.
