= 2003–04 snooker season =

Details
- Duration: 21 August 2003 – 20 May 2004
- Tournaments: 17 (8 ranking events)

Triple Crown winners
- UK Championship: (Wales) Matthew Stevens
- Masters: (England) Paul Hunter
- World Championship: (England) Ronnie O'Sullivan

The 2003–04 snooker season was a series of snooker tournaments played between 21 August 2003 and 20 May 2004. The following table outlines the results for ranking events and the invitational events.

LG Corporation signed a sponsorship agreement with World Snooker, and the seven world ranking events before the World Championship were branded as the "LG Electronics Tour". These tournaments carried conventional ranking points but also had a separate points system, with a £50,000 prize for the player who accumulated the most points during the LG Electronics Tour. Ronnie O'Sullivan was the eventual winner of the cash prize, but both the sponsorship and format would only last for one season.

== Calendar ==
=== World Snooker Tour ===
| Start | Finish | Country | Tournament name | Venue | City | Winner | Runner-up | Score | Ref. |
|---|---|---|---|---|---|---|---|---|---|
| 4 Oct | 12 Oct | ENG | LG Cup | Guild Hall | Preston | (Wales) Mark Williams | (Scotland) John Higgins | 9–5 | |
| 8 Nov | 16 Nov | ENG | British Open | The Brighton Centre | Brighton | (Scotland) Stephen Hendry | (England) Ronnie O'Sullivan | 9–6 | |
| 18 Nov | 30 Nov | ENG | UK Championship | Barbican Centre | York | (Wales) Matthew Stevens | (Scotland) Stephen Hendry | 10–8 | |
| 15 Dec | 21 Dec | WAL | Masters Qualifying Event | Pontin's | Prestatyn | (Australia) Neil Robertson | (Wales) Dominic Dale | 6–5 | |
| 19 Jan | 25 Jan | WAL | Welsh Open | Newport Centre | Newport | (England) Ronnie O'Sullivan | (England) Steve Davis | 9–8 | |
| 1 Feb | 8 Feb | ENG | Masters | Wembley Conference Centre | London | (England) Paul Hunter | (England) Ronnie O'Sullivan | 10–9 | |
| 1 Mar | 6 Mar | MLT | European Open | Hilton Conference Center | Portomaso | (Scotland) Stephen Maguire | (England) Jimmy White | 9–3 | |
| 10 Jan | 14 Mar | WAL | Premier League | Colwyn Bay Leisure Centre | Colwyn Bay | (Scotland) Stephen Hendry | (Scotland) John Higgins | 9–6 | |
| 23 Mar | 28 Mar | IRL | Irish Masters | Citywest Hotel | Dublin | (England) Peter Ebdon | (England) Mark King | 10–7 | |
| 3 Apr | 11 Apr | SCO | Players Championship | S.E.C.C. | Glasgow | (England) Jimmy White | (England) Paul Hunter | 9–7 | |
| 17 Apr | 3 May | ENG | World Snooker Championship | Crucible Theatre | Sheffield | (England) Ronnie O'Sullivan | (Scotland) Graeme Dott | 18–8 | |

Ranking event
Non-ranking event

=== Challenge Tour ===
| Start | Finish | Country | Tournament name | Venue | City | Winner | Runner-up | Score | Ref. |
|---|---|---|---|---|---|---|---|---|---|
| 13 Sep | 19 Sep | WAL | Challenge Tour 1 | Pontin's | Prestatyn | (Netherlands) Stefan Mazrocis | (England) Paul Davison | 6–2 | |
| 2 Dec | 8 Dec | WAL | Challenge Tour 2 | Pontin's | Prestatyn | (Scotland) Hugh Abernethy | (England) Gary Wilson | 6–0 | |
| 21 Feb | 29 Feb | WAL | Challenge Tour 3 | Pontin's | Prestatyn | (England) Brian Salmon | (England) Steve James | 6–1 | |
| 12 May | 20 May | WAL | Challenge Tour 4 | Pontin's | Prestatyn | (England) Gary Wilson | (China) Jin Long | 6–4 | |

=== Other events ===
| Start | Finish | Country | Tournament name | Venue | City | Winner | Runner-up | Score | Ref. |
|---|---|---|---|---|---|---|---|---|---|
| 21 Aug | 24 Aug | HKG | Euro-Asia Masters Challenge – Event 1 | HKCEC | Wan Chai | (Thailand) James Wattana | (Republic of Ireland) Ken Doherty | 6–4 | |
| 28 Aug | 31 Aug | THA | Euro-Asia Masters Challenge – Event 2 | Merchant Court Hotel | Bangkok | (Republic of Ireland) Ken Doherty | (Hong Kong) Marco Fu | 5–2 | |

=== Ladies event ===
| Start | Finish | Country | Tournament name | Venue | City | Winner | Runner-up | Score | Ref. |
|---|---|---|---|---|---|---|---|---|---|
| 1 May | 1 May | ENG | Connie Gough National | Rileys Snooker Centre | Luton | (England) Reanne Evans | (England) Emma Bonney | 4–2 | |

== Official rankings ==
The top 16 of the world rankings, these players automatically played in the final rounds of the world ranking events and were invited for the Masters.

| No. | Ch. | Player | Points 2001/02 | Points 2002/03 | Total |
|---|---|---|---|---|---|
| 1 | ▲ | (Wales) Mark Williams | 25050 | 27550 | 52600 |
| 2 | ▲ | (Scotland) Stephen Hendry | 24650 | 20150 | 44800 |
| 3 | ▼ | (England) Ronnie O'Sullivan | 24625 | 20125 | 44750 |
| 4 | Steady | (Scotland) John Higgins | 22300 | 20275 | 42575 |
| 5 | ▲ | (England) Stephen Lee | 25725 | 16675 | 42400 |
| 6 | ▼ | (Republic of Ireland) Ken Doherty | 21400 | 18975 | 40375 |
| 7 | ▼ | (England) Peter Ebdon | 23875 | 16025 | 39900 |
| 8 | ▲ | (England) Paul Hunter | 15500 | 21450 | 36950 |
| 9 | ▼ | (Wales) Matthew Stevens | 18000 | 14875 | 32875 |
| 10 | ▲ | (Scotland) Alan McManus | 13550 | 16425 | 29975 |
| 11 | ▲ | (England) Steve Davis | 12900 | 15875 | 28775 |
| 12 | ▲ | (England) David Gray | 13712 | 14300 | 28012 |
| 13 | ▼ | (Scotland) Graeme Dott | 15762 | 11500 | 27262 |
| 14 | Steady | (Australia) Quinten Hann | 14837 | 12312 | 27149 |
| 15 | ▼ | (England) Jimmy White | 16925 | 9962 | 26887 |
| 16 | ▼ | (England) Joe Perry | 17700 | 8937 | 26637 |

== Points distribution ==
2003/2004 Points distribution for world ranking events, all new players received double points:

| Tournament | Round → | L128 | L96 | L80 | L64 | L48 | L32 | L16 | QF | SF | F | W |
|---|---|---|---|---|---|---|---|---|---|---|---|---|
| LG Cup | Unseeded loser | 200 | 400 | 650 | 900 | 1150 | 1450 | 1750 | 2050 | 2500 | 3000 | 4000 |
| LG Cup | Seeded loser | – | – | 325 | 450 | 575 | 725 | – | – | – | – | – |
| British Open | Unseeded loser | 200 | 400 | 650 | 900 | 1150 | 1450 | 1750 | 2050 | 2500 | 3000 | 4000 |
| British Open | Seeded loser | – | – | 325 | 450 | 575 | 725 | – | – | – | – | – |
| UK Championship | Unseeded loser | 300 | 600 | 975 | 1350 | 1725 | 2175 | 2625 | 3075 | 3750 | 4500 | 6000 |
| UK Championship | Seeded loser | – | – | 487 | 675 | 862 | 1087 | – | – | – | – | – |
| Welsh Open | Unseeded loser | 200 | 400 | 650 | 900 | 1150 | 1450 | 1750 | 2050 | 2500 | 3000 | 4000 |
| Welsh Open | Seeded loser | – | – | 325 | 450 | 575 | 725 | – | – | – | – | – |
| European Open | Unseeded loser | 200 | 400 | 650 | 900 | 1150 | 1450 | 1750 | 2050 | 2500 | 3000 | 4000 |
| European Open | Seeded loser | – | – | 325 | 450 | 575 | 725 | – | – | – | – | – |
| Irish Masters | Unseeded loser | 200 | 400 | 650 | 900 | 1150 | 1450 | 1750 | 2050 | 2500 | 3000 | 4000 |
| Irish Masters | Seeded loser | – | – | 325 | 450 | 575 | 725 | – | – | – | – | – |
| Players Championship | Unseeded loser | 200 | 400 | 650 | 900 | 1150 | 1450 | 1750 | 2050 | 2500 | 3000 | 4000 |
| Players Championship | Seeded loser | – | – | 325 | 450 | 575 | 725 | – | – | – | – | – |
| World Championship | Unseeded loser | 400 | 800 | 1300 | 1800 | 2300 | 2900 | 3500 | 4100 | 5000 | 6000 | 8000 |
| World Championship | Seeded loser | – | – | 650 | 900 | 1150 | 1450 | – | – | – | – | – |
