= 2022 Hong Kong Masters =

Hong Kong Masters
Tournament information
- Dates: 6–9 October 2022
- Venue: Hong Kong Coliseum
- City: Hong Kong
- Organisation: World Snooker Tour; HKBSCC
- Format: Non-ranking event
- Total prize fund: £314,000
- Winner's share: £100,000
- Highest break: Marco Fu (HKG) (147)

Final
- Champion: Ronnie O'Sullivan (ENG)
- Runner-up: Marco Fu (HKG)
- Score: 6–4

The 2022 Hong Kong Masters was an invitational professional snooker tournament that took place from 6 to 9 October 2022 at the Hong Kong Coliseum in Hong Kong. Organised by the Hong Kong Billiard Sports Control Council and the World Snooker Tour as part of the 2022–23 snooker season, the tournament was staged for the first time since the 2017 edition. It was the first professional snooker tournament held outside Europe, as well as the first major sporting event held in Hong Kong, since the beginning of the COVID-19 pandemic. The winner received £100,000 from a total prize purse of £314,000.

Two native Hong Kong players and the top six players in the snooker world rankings as they stood after the 2022 World Snooker Championship were invited to take part. Overseas players were granted a limited exemption from Hong Kong's COVID-19 regulations, enabling them to travel between the venue and their hotel without quarantining. Zhao Xintong was forced to withdraw after he tested positive for COVID-19, and was replaced in the draw by Mark Williams.

Neil Robertson was the defending champion, having defeated Ronnie O'Sullivan 6–3 in the final of the 2017 edition, but he lost 4–6 to O'Sullivan in the semi-finals. Hong Kong native Marco Fu had taken time away from the sport after undergoing eye surgery in 2017, and then did not compete professionally for over two years following the 2020 Welsh Open, due to COVID-19 travel restrictions. However, he defeated Mark Selby 5–2 in the quarter-finals and made the fifth maximum break of his career in the deciding frame of his semi-final against John Higgins. The highest of the 18 century breaks made during the event, Fu's 147 marked the seventh time in snooker history that a player won a deciding frame with a maximum. O'Sullivan defeated Fu 6–4 in the final to win the tournament for the first time. Around 9,000 spectators attended the final, setting a new record for the largest live audience at a snooker match.

== Format ==
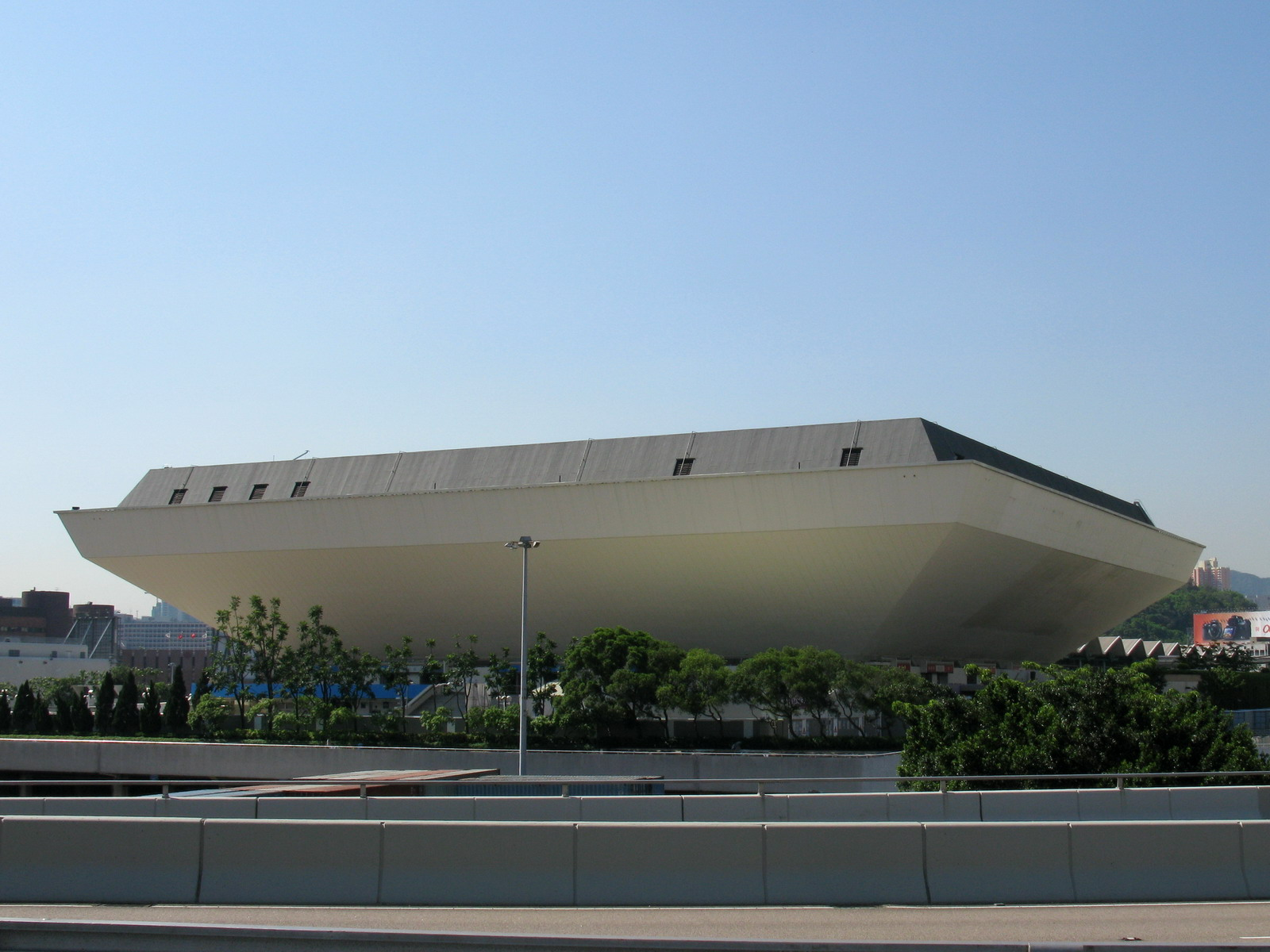
The event took place at the Hong Kong Coliseum in Hong Kong.

The Hong Kong Masters is a professional snooker competition that was first held in 1983; the inaugural champion was Doug Mountjoy. Held from 6 to 9 October 2022 at the Hong Kong Coliseum in Hung Hom in Hong Kong, the 2022 event was the first staging of the Hong Kong Masters since 2017. It was also the first professional snooker tournament played outside Europe, as well as the first major sporting event held in Hong Kong, since the beginning of the COVID-19 pandemic. The event was organised by the Hong Kong Billiard Sports Control Council and the World Snooker Tour as part of the 2022–23 snooker season.

Eight players were chosen to compete at the event. The six highest ranked players following the 2022 World Snooker Championship and two players from Hong Kong, Marco Fu and Ng On-yee were invited. Overseas players were granted a limited exemption from Hong Kong's COVID-19 regulations, enabling them to travel between the venue and their hotel without quarantining. Zhao Xintong was forced to withdraw after he tested positive for COVID-19 and was replaced in the draw by Mark Williams, the next eligible player according to the invitation criteria.

Matches were played as the best of nine frames in the quarter-finals, and as the best of 11 frames for the semi-finals and final. The event was broadcast domestically on Now TV; on Eurosport in the United Kingdom and India; on Liaoning TV, Superstar online, Kuaishou, Migu, Youku and Huya.com in China; on Sportscast in Indonesia; on TAP in the Philippines; on True Sport in Thailand; on Sports Cast in Taiwan; on Astro SuperSport in Australia; on DAZN in Canada and by Matchroom Sport in all other territories.

=== Prize fund ===
A breakdown of the prize money awarded is shown below:

- Winner: £100,000
- Runner-up: £50,000
- Semi-final: £32,000
- Quarter-final: £22,500
- Highest break: £10,000
- Total: £314,000

== Tournament summary ==
=== Quarter-finals ===
The quarter-finals were played on 6 and 7 October as the best of nine frames. Marco Fu had taken time away from the sport after undergoing eye surgery in 2017, and then did not compete professionally for over two years after the 2020 Welsh Open due to COVID-19 pandemic travel restrictions. However, he won three of the first four frames against Mark Selby and went on to win the match 5–2. Fu admitted that he had considered retirement during his prolonged absences from the professional tour, but said he was "delighted to be back playing to a decent standard".

John Higgins defeated Judd Trump for the first time in four years, following seven consecutive losses to Trump that included the finals of the 2019 World Championship and the 2021 Champion of Champions. Higgins won the first frame, but Trump tied the scores with a 136 break in the second. Higgins won the next two frames with breaks of 102 and 68 to lead 3–1 at the mid-session interval, but Trump then won three consecutive frames, making a 120 break in the fifth, to lead 4–3. However, Higgins took the match to a deciding frame with a 70 break and produced a break of 58 in the decider that helped him clinch a 5–4 win.

Following Zhao's withdrawal, his replacement Williams made a last-minute trip to Hong Kong to face defending champion Neil Robertson. After a 13-hour flight from London and multiple COVID tests, Williams arrived at his hotel an hour before he had to depart for the venue, stating that he had slept for two hours in the preceding two days. He made a 133 break in the opening frame, but Robertson responded with a 105 in the second. Williams won the third frame on the black, but Robertson again drew level, tying the scores at 2–2. After the mid-session interval, Robertson made a 140 break in the fifth frame and also won the sixth for a 4–2 lead. Williams won the seventh with an 80 break, and had a chance in the eighth to force a decider, but Robertson clinched a 5–3 win after Williams went in-off. Williams stated afterwards that he knew he could not win the match under such conditions, but had travelled to the tournament because of the prize money on offer. He earned £22,500 as a losing quarter-finalist.

Playing before an audience of over 5,000 spectators, the reigning world champion and world number one Ronnie O'Sullivan made breaks of 72, 100, 59, 81, and 95 as he whitewashed three-time World Women's Snooker champion Ng On-yee 5–0 in a match that lasted just 52 minutes. O'Sullivan praised the atmosphere at the tournament, saying "it was nice to play in front of an enthusiastic crowd".

=== Semi-finals ===
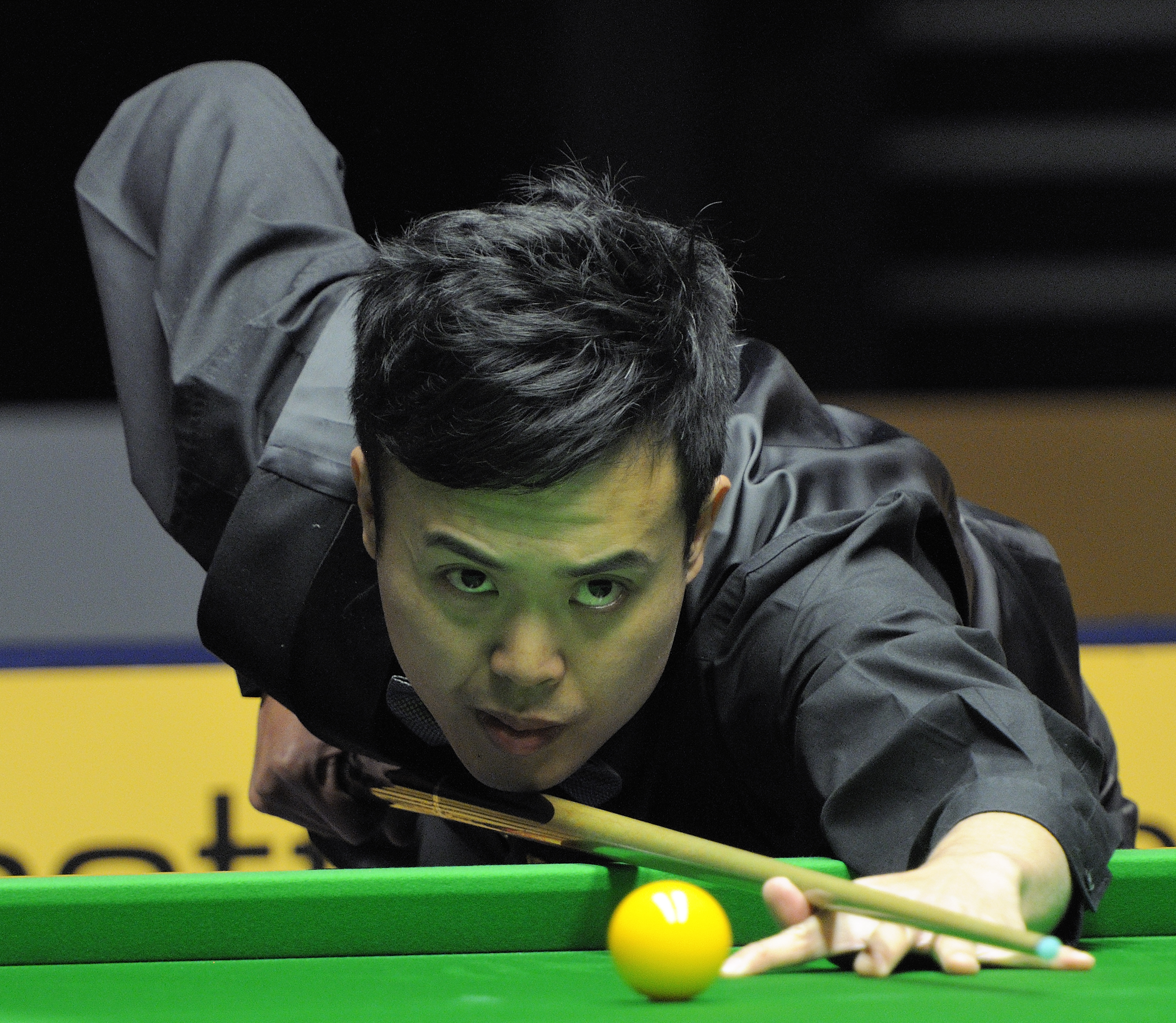
Marco Fu (pictured) made the fifth maximum break of his career in the deciding frame of his semi-final win over John Higgins.

The semi-finals were played on 8 October as the best of 11 frames. In the first semi-final, again played before an audience of more than 5,000 spectators, Fu faced Higgins, who won the opening frame with a 105 break. Fu tied the scores with a 75 break in the second after Higgins missed a red, but Higgins won the next two frames with breaks of 68 and 83 to lead 3–1 at the mid-session interval. Fu won the fifth frame with a 61 break, but Higgins moved into a 4–2 lead with a 91 break in the sixth. In the seventh frame, Higgins failed to pot a red ball while on a break of 41 and Fu took the frame with a 70 break; he also won the eighth frame to tie the scores at 4–4. Higgins made his second 105 break of the match in the ninth frame to take a 5–4 lead, but Fu responded with a 72 break in the tenth to force a decider. Fu made the fifth maximum break of his career to defeat Higgins 6–5, marking the seventh time in snooker history that a maximum break had occurred in the deciding frame of a match. Fu called his 147 before his home crowd "my best moment so far as a professional".

In the second semi-final, played before an audience of around 7,500, O'Sullivan faced Robertson. O'Sullivan won the first frame, but Robertson took the second on the black to tie the scores at 1–1. Robertson then made three consecutive centuries of 105, 100, and 135 to take a 4–1 lead. Robertson scored a total of 443 points without reply before he missed a black ball off the spot in the sixth frame, which gave O'Sullivan the opportunity to win the frame with a 93 break. O'Sullivan won a tactical seventh frame to move within a frame of Robertson at 3–4, and then made back-to-back centuries of 105 and 104 to lead 5–4. Robertson took the lead in the tenth frame, but O'Sullivan potted a double and made a 52 clearance to win his fifth consecutive frame and clinch the match 6–4. "I was getting outplayed, but I hung in there", O'Sullivan said of his comeback from 1–4 behind. "I don’t beat myself up as much as I used to, so I always give myself a chance".

=== Final ===
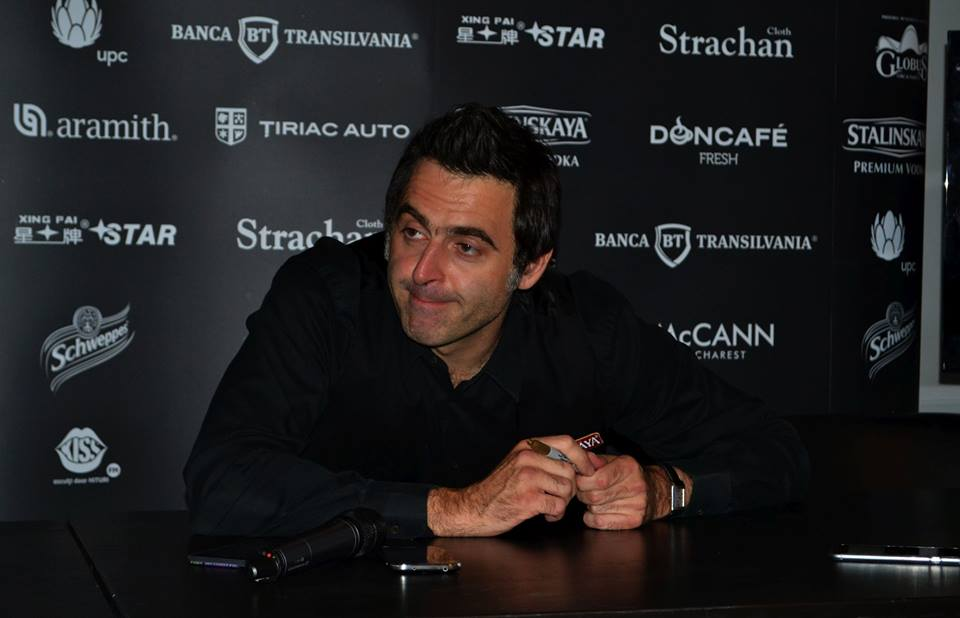
Ronnie O'Sullivan won the event for the first time.

The final was played on 9 October as a best-of-11-frame match between O'Sullivan and Fu. Around 9,000 spectators attended the sold-out final, setting a new record for the largest live audience at a snooker match. The previous record of 3,000 spectators had been set at the 2017 edition of the event. O'Sullivan won the first frame, but Fu took the second with a 55 break. O'Sullivan then won the third and fourth with breaks of 71 and 59 to lead 3–1 at the mid-session interval. O'Sullivan also won the fifth frame for a 4–1 lead. Although Fu won the sixth with a 98 break, O'Sullivan responded with a 105 century in the seventh to move within one frame of victory. In the eighth frame, O'Sullivan seemed to be on the verge of winning, but missed a shot on the pink into the yellow pocket, allowing Fu to make a frame-winning clearance, helped by a cross-double on the final blue. Fu also won the ninth with a 56 break to trail by one frame at 4–5. However, O’Sullivan produced a 114 total clearance in the tenth frame, defeating Fu 6–4 to win the tournament. After his win, O'Sullivan commented that "to play in front of 9,000 fans is just incredible" and called the tournament "the best event I’ve ever played in my life”.

== Main draw ==
The results from the event are shown below. Players in bold denote match winners.

**Quarter-finals**; Best of 9 frames
**Ronnie O'Sullivan (ENG) (1)**	**5**
Ng On-yee (HKG)	0
**Neil Robertson (AUS) (4)**	**5**
Mark Williams (WAL)	3
Mark Selby (ENG) (3)	2
**Marco Fu (HKG)**	**5**
Judd Trump (ENG) (2)	4
**John Higgins (SCO)**	**5**

**Semi-finals**; Best of 11 frames
**(England) Ronnie O'Sullivan (1)**	**6**
(Australia) Neil Robertson (4)	4
**(Hong Kong) Marco Fu**	**6**
(Scotland) John Higgins	5

**Final**; Best of 11 frames
**(England) Ronnie O'Sullivan (1)**	**6**
(Hong Kong) Marco Fu	4

=== Final ===
Final: Best of 11 frames. Referee: Jerry Chan; Hong Kong Coliseum, Hung Hom, Hong Kong, 9 October 2022.
**Ronnie O'Sullivan (1)**; England	**6**–4	Marco Fu; Hong Kong
Frame scores: **122 (52)**–0, 0–**99 (55)**, **71 (71)**–13, **102 (59)**–1, **72**–28, 0–**98 (98)**, **105 (105)**–0, 52 (51)–**61**, 15–**77 (56)**, **114 (114)**–0
**114**	Highest break	98
**2**	Century breaks	0
**6**	50+ breaks	3

== Century breaks ==
There were 18 century breaks made during the event. The highest was a maximum break of 147 made by Fu in the deciding frame of his semi-final match with Higgins.

- 147 – Marco Fu
- 140, 135, 105, 105, 100 – Neil Robertson
- 136, 120 – Judd Trump
- 133 – Mark Williams
- 114, 105, 105, 104, 100 – Ronnie O'Sullivan
- 112 – Mark Selby
- 105, 105, 102 – John Higgins
