= Euro-Asia Masters Challenge =

Tournament information
- Venue: Various
- Established: 2003
- Organisation(s): 110 Sports Management Group
- Format: Non-ranking event
- Final year: 2007
- Final champion: (Scotland) John Higgins

The Euro-Asia Masters Challenge was an invitational professional non-ranking snooker tournament which ran for three editions.

== History ==
In August 2003, the tournament was first held as a two-legged event. Featuring eight players across the two legs, the first leg was played in Wan Chai, Hong Kong, with James Wattana defeating Ken Doherty in the final to win the £30,000 prize. Wattana defeated Stephen Hendry in 5–1 in the semi-final, with Doherty defeating Mark Williams by the same scoreline in the second semi-final.

In the second leg played in Bangkok, Thailand, Doherty was victorious defeating Marco Fu in the final. Doherty defeated Ding Junhui 5–4 in his semi-final, while Fu had defeated Jimmy White 5–3 in the other semi.

The tournament was revived in 2007, with the addition of a team tournament. In the singles event John Higgins defeating James Wattana in the final in Hong Kong to take the £25,000 prize.

== Winners ==
Year	Winner	Runner-up	Final score	Venue	Season
2003 – Event 1	(Thailand) James Wattana	(Republic of Ireland) Ken Doherty	6–4	(Hong Kong) Wan Chai	2003/04
2003 – Event 2	(Republic of Ireland) Ken Doherty	(Hong Kong) Marco Fu	5–2	(Thailand) Bangkok	2003/04
2007	(Scotland) John Higgins	(Thailand) James Wattana	5–4	(Hong Kong) Wan Chai	2007/08
