= 2003 Premier League Snooker =

Hasseröder Premier League
Tournament information
- Dates: 11 January – 11 May 2003
- Country: United Kingdom
- Organisation: Matchroom Sport
- Format: Non-ranking event
- Total prize fund: £180,000
- Winner's share: £45,000
- Highest break: Marco Fu (HKG) (139)

Final
- Champion: (Hong Kong) Marco Fu
- Runner-up: (Wales) Mark Williams
- Score: 9–5

The 2003 Hasseröder Premier League was a professional non-ranking snooker tournament that was played from 11 January to 11 May 2003.

Marco Fu won in the final 9–5 against Mark Williams.

== Prize fund ==
The breakdown of prize money for this year is shown below:

- Winner: £45,000
- Runner-up: £20,000
- Semi-final: £12,500
- Frame-win: £500 (only in league phase)
- Highest break: £6,000
- Total: £180,000

== League phase ==
Ranking		(England) OSU	(Wales) WIL	(England) EBD	(Hong Kong) FU	(England) WHI	(Scotland) HIG	(England) DAV	Frame W-L	Match W-D-L	Pld-Pts
1	Ronnie O'Sullivan	x	5	5	5	6	5	5	31–17	6–0–0	6–12
2	Mark Williams	3	x	6	1	6	5	6	27–21	4–0–2	6–8
3	Peter Ebdon	3	2	x	4	4	6	5	24–24	2–2–2	6–6
4	Marco Fu	3	7	4	x	2	4	4	24–24	1–3–2	6–5
5	Jimmy White	2	2	4	6	x	5	2	21–27	2–1–3	6–5
6	John Higgins	3	3	2	4	3	x	6	21–27	1–1–4	6–3
7	Steve Davis	3	2	3	4	6	2	x	20–28	1–1–4	6–3

Top four qualified for the play-offs. If points were level then most frames won determined their positions. If two players had an identical record then the result in their match determined their positions. If that ended 4–4 then the player who got to four first was higher. (Breaks above 50 shown between (parentheses); century breaks are indicated with bold.)

- 11 January – Borough Hall, Hartlepool, England
  - John Higgins 6–2 Steve Davis → (50) 83–30, 35–85, (97)-31, 62–68, (59) 63–39, (66) 94–36, 67–47, (122)-18
  - Mark Williams 1–7 Marco Fu → 0–74, 73–34, 4–94 (68), 46–59, 0-(139), 0–134 (84), 51–53, 0–85 (79)
  - Ronnie O'Sullivan 6–2 Jimmy White → 44–63, (54) 68–42, (51) 86–11, 64–16, (67) 112–14, (78)-21, (100)-1, 41–67
- 12 January – Borough Hall, Hartlepool, England
  - John Higgins 3–5 Jimmy White → 24–63, 42–55(49), 15-(72), (55) 69–57, 4-(81), 69–14, 0-(131), 77–9
  - Ronnie O'Sullivan 5–3 Steve Davis → (105) 110–11, (62) 72–48, 59–64, 54–53, (92)-6, 5–92 (88), 0-(95), (70) 71–5
  - Mark Williams 6–2 Peter Ebdon → (102) 106–7, (125) 137–0, 1–86 (52), 60–31, (71) 75–33, (78) 82–0, 73–31, 21–114 (108)
- 18 January – Floral Hall, Southport, England
  - Peter Ebdon 6–2 John Higgins → 70–26, 75-(67), 0-(90), 0–136 (104), 57–49, 65–45, (67)-12, 69–5
  - Steve Davis 6–2 Jimmy White → 68–27, 0–72, 65–41, (53) 65–12, 53–42, 64–25, (54)-66, (91) 92–8
- 19 January – Floral Hall, Southport, England
  - Ronnie O'Sullivan 5–3 Marco Fu → 0-(100), (101) 105–0, 0–97 (89), 50–65, 65–40, (55) 72–9, (80)-4, (51) 82–31
  - Peter Ebdon 4–4 Jimmy White → 8-(58), 56–27, 51–67, 24–57, (53) 54–63 (57), 69–46, (85) 90–7, 61–33
  - Mark Williams 5–3 John Higgins → (123) 124–0, (50) 71–31, (56) 83–32, 0–72, 0-(132), 0-(73), (69) 70–0, 81–31
- 15 February – Flint Pavilion, Flint, Wales
  - Steve Davis 4–4 Marco Fu → (61) 73–25, 18–59, 26-(88), 56–21, 1–107 (102), 14-(111), (50) 68–66, 60–29
  - Ronnie O'Sullivan 5–3 Mark Williams → 0–67 (53), 28–65, 9–66, (114) 118–0, (77)-0, (58) 73–55, 67–34, (93) 101–0
- 16 February – Flint Pavilion, Flint, Wales
  - Peter Ebdon 5–3 Steve Davis → (62) 97–24, (134) 138–1, 0-(104), 22–114 (110), (53) 82–0, 39–72 (55), (53) 65–53, (52) 75–6
  - John Higgins 4–4 Marco Fu → 38–84, (83) 97–18, 76–0, 1–79 (52), (88)-4, 63–29, 44- 62, 43–58
  - Mark Williams 6–2 Jimmy White → 67–16, 64–63, 8–76 (53), 78–11, 70–14, (52) 58–50, (56) 60–37, 29–60 (51)
- 22 March – Colwyn Bay Leisure Centre, Colwyn Bay, Wales
  - Peter Ebdon 4–4 Marco Fu → 0–84, 42–73, (69)-16, 17–67, 60–12, 1–81 (57), 70–54, 57–56
  - Ronnie O'Sullivan 5–3 John Higgins → 65–64 (56), (91)-0, 50–63, (61) 69–1, 73–14, 42–83 (73), 62–25, 5–88 (79)
- 23 March – Colwyn Bay Leisure Centre, Colwyn Bay, Wales
  - Mark Williams 6–2 Steve Davis → 1–62 (61), 70–45, 53–20, 17–63, (62) 89–26, 65–58 (50), 78–41, 75–24
  - Jimmy White 6–2 Marco Fu → 65–52, (71) 72–16, 73–29, 57–43, (75) 81–24, 11–72 (59), 14–75 (68), (50) 74–1
  - Ronnie O'Sullivan 5–3 Peter Ebdon → 0–134 (125), 75–41, (52) 89–6, (93) 101–27, (72) 85–39, 56–83, (90) 121–1, 0-(106)

== Play-offs ==
10–11 May – Crowtree Leisure Centre, Sunderland, England

Semi-finals; Best of 11 frames
1	(England) Ronnie O'Sullivan	4
4	(Hong Kong) Marco Fu*	6
2	(Wales) Mark Williams**	6
3	(England) Peter Ebdon	2

Final; Best of 17 frames
4	(Hong Kong) Marco Fu***	9
2	(Wales) Mark Williams	5

*58–69, 83–25, 24–66, (63) 75–8, 9-(67), 0–98 (57), 72–60 (53), 39–80 (55), (67)-(60), 42–61
**(58) 73–26, (80)-(52), (100) 104–32, 23–82 (57), (54) 74–57, 49–57, (56) 71–48, 59–32
***(59) 83–22, 44–82, 68-(57), 50–65, 0-(138'), 69–52, 0–113 (99), 0–66 (65), (103)-0, (57) 58–33, (71) 85–49, 80–30, (51) 52–11, (66) 78–0

== Century breaks ==
- 139, 111, 103, 102, 100 – Marco Fu
- 138, 125, 123, 102, 100 – Mark Williams
- 134, 125, 108, 106 – Peter Ebdon
- 132, 122, 104 – John Higgins
- 131 – Jimmy White
- 114, 105, 101, 100 – Ronnie O'Sullivan
- 110, 104 – Steve Davis
