= Marco Fu =

Hong Kongese snooker player

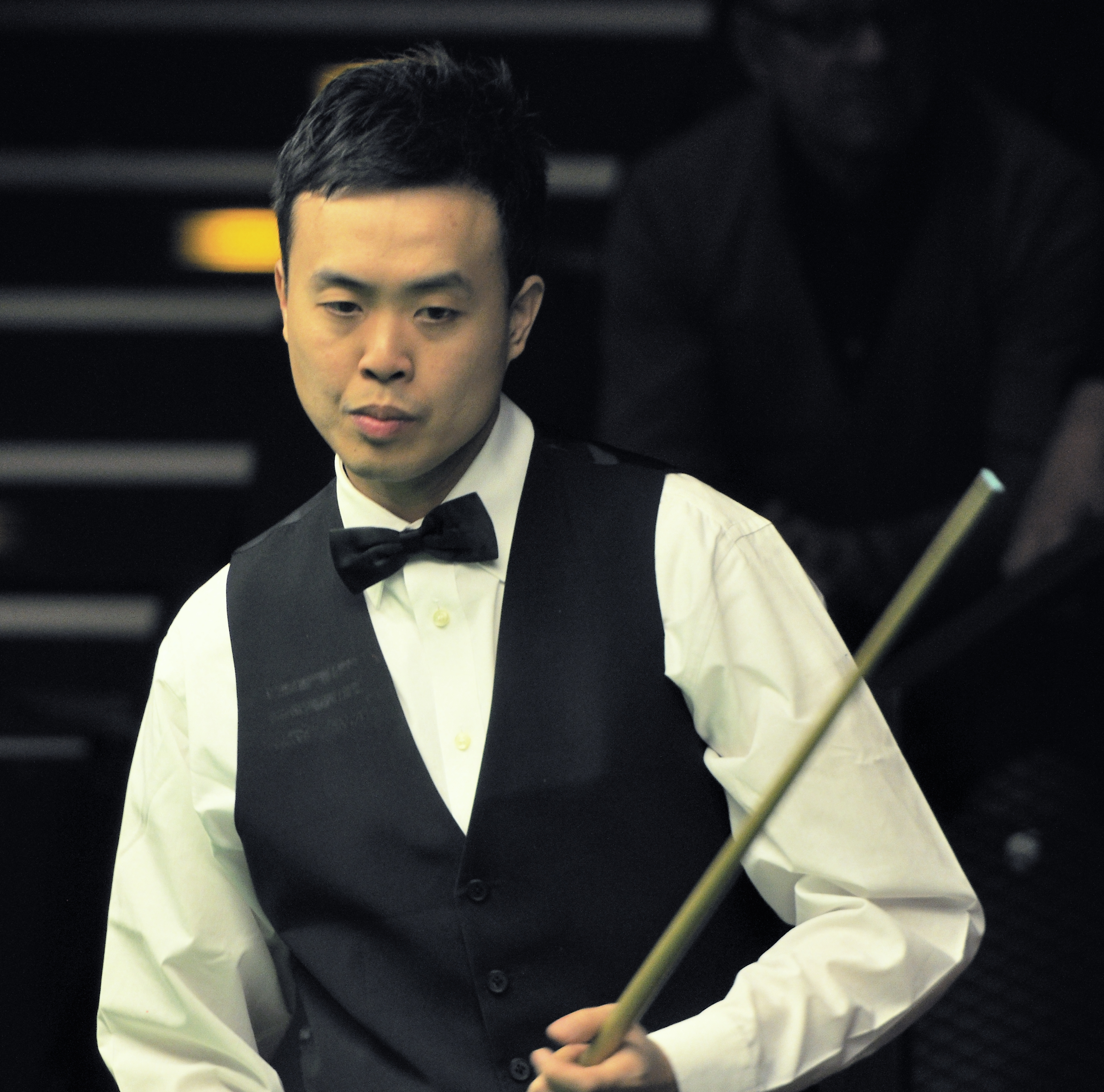
- Fu at the 2014 German Masters

Personal information
- Born: 8 January 1978 (age 48) British Hong Kong

Sport
- Country: Hong Kong
- Sport: Snooker
- Professional: 1998–present
- Highest ranking: 5 (June 2017)
- Current ranking: 65 (as of 7 November 2026)
- Maximum breaks: 5
- Century breaks: 575 (as of 19 November 2026)

Tournament wins
- Ranking: 3
- Minor-ranking: 1
Medal record
Men's snooker
Representing Hong Kong
Asian Games
Gold medal – first place	1998 Bangkok	Team
Silver medal – second place	2002 Busan	Doubles
Gold medal – first place	2002 Busan	Team
Silver medal – second place	2006 Doha	Doubles
Silver medal – second place	2006 Doha	Team
Gold medal – first place	2010 Guangzhou	Singles
East Asian Games
Gold medal – first place	2009 Hong Kong	Team

Marco Fu
- Traditional Chinese: 傅家俊
- Simplified Chinese: 傅家俊
- Cantonese Yale: Fuh Gā Jeun
Transcriptions
Standard Mandarin
- Hanyu Pinyin: Fù Jiājùn
Yue: Cantonese
- Yale Romanization: Fuh Gā Jeun
- Jyutping: Fu⁶ Gaa¹ Zeon³

Marco Fu Ka-chun (Chinese: 傅家俊; born 8 January 1978) is a Hong Kong professional snooker player. He is a three-time ranking event winner, having won the 2007 Grand Prix, the 2013 Australian Goldfields Open and the 2016 Scottish Open. He has been a runner-up at two Triple Crown events, at the 2008 UK Championship and the 2011 Masters. In addition, Fu has reached the semi-finals of the World Championship twice—in 2006 and in 2016.

Fu reached a career-high ranking of fifth in the world in 2017. He turned professional in 1998 and has remained on the World Snooker Tour to-date. Despite not competing in events during the COVID-19 pandemic, Fu was given an invitational place to remain on the tour during the 2021–22 snooker season. As a prolific break-builder, Fu has compiled over 500 century breaks in professional competition, including five maximum breaks. A cultural icon in Hong Kong, Fu presented a 10-episode chat show called Marco Fu and Friends on ViuTV.

== Career ==
=== Early career ===
Marco Fu was born on 8 January 1978 in British Hong Kong. He began playing snooker at age nine, but did not do so regularly until he was 15. Fu migrated to Vancouver, British Columbia, Canada with his parents at age 12. After his high school graduation at age 18, Hong Kong Billiard Sports Control Council Co. Ltd. President Joseph Lo invited him to return to Hong Kong to begin his career as a professional snooker player. Before turning professional, Fu won the IBSF World Snooker Championship and the IBSF World Under-21 Snooker Championship, both in 1997.

After winning these tournaments, Fu turned professional for the 1998–99 snooker season. In his first season as a professional, he was ranked 377th in the world. He reached the final of the Grand Prix, beating Ronnie O'Sullivan 5–2 and then Peter Ebdon 5–3. Stephen Lee defeated him 2–9 in the final. During the rest of the 1998–99 season, Fu qualified for four more ranking tournaments, including the 1999 World Snooker Championship, winning four qualifying matches before losing to James Wattana 8–10 in the first round of the main draw. He was voted World Professional Billiards and Snooker Association (WPBSA) Newcomer of the Year and WSA Young Player of the Year in 1999.

=== World Championship quarter-finalist (1999–2003) ===
In the 1999–00 season, with Fu now ranked 35th in the world, he received automatic entry into the main draw of most of the ranking tournaments. Although he failed to repeat the success of reaching the final of the Grand Prix, he made a run to the quarter-finals before losing to Ali Carter. Other achievements of note include reaching the semi-finals of the 2000 Malta Grand Prix and the Scottish Open. Following a dramatic rise, in the 2000–01 season Fu was ranked 15th in the world, his first appearance in the top 16. However, a succession of defeats and a first-round loss at the 2001 World Snooker Championship to Chris Small, saw him fall out of the top 16 for the next season. In the 2001–02 season Fu's best result was a last 16 appearance at the LG Cup. He failed to qualify for three ranking events, including the 2002 World Snooker Championship, and, as a result, his ranking fell to 27 for the following season.

Prior to the 2003 Welsh Open, his best result of the 2002–03 season was reaching the third round of the 2002 UK Championship in December 2002. However, at the Welsh Open in February, Fu defeated Stephen Lee 5–0 in the second round and beat Ronnie O'Sullivan 5–3 in the quarter-finals before losing his semi-final 4–6 to Stephen Hendry, who went on to win the title. Going into the 2003 World Snooker Championship three months later, after first round losses at the European and Scottish Opens, he drew world number one Ronnie O'Sullivan in the first round.

Snooker Scene later described the match between O'Sullivan and Fu as "one of the greatest upsets in the history of the game". Fu held a 6–3 overnight lead and, despite O'Sullivan making a maximum break, Fu won 10–6. Fu subsequently eliminated Alan McManus 13–7 in the second round, before losing 7–13 to Stephen Lee in his quarter-final match. Later that year, Fu won his biggest title at the time winning the invitational Premier League, beating Mark Williams 9–5 in the final.

=== First ranking tournament title (2004–2008) ===
As a result of his run to the quarter-finals of the World Championship the previous season, Fu climbed to number 19 in the world rankings for the 2003–04 season. He qualified for all the ranking tournaments except the World Championship. His best result included a third round loss to Michael Holt in the LG Cup and reaching the semi-finals of the Welsh Open, beating Liu Song, Matthew Stevens, Ken Doherty and Stephen Hendry before succumbing to Steve Davis. Fu finished the season ranked 16th in the world.

His best result the following season was a quarter-final loss to Ding Junhui at the China Open. He finished the season ranked 25, falling nine places. A series of first round defeats during the 2005–06 season saw him provisionally drop out of the top 32. However, he had a good run at the 2006 World Championship, beating three seeded players—Alan McManus 10–3, Stephen Maguire 13–4, and Ken Doherty 13–10. He reached the semi-finals where he lost to the 2002 world champion Peter Ebdon 16–17. In that match, Fu was 9–15 down with only one session left to play, but won seven out of the next eight frames to send the match into the deciding frame, which Ebdon eventually won. This run enabled him to stay in the world top 32 for next season, ranked 22.

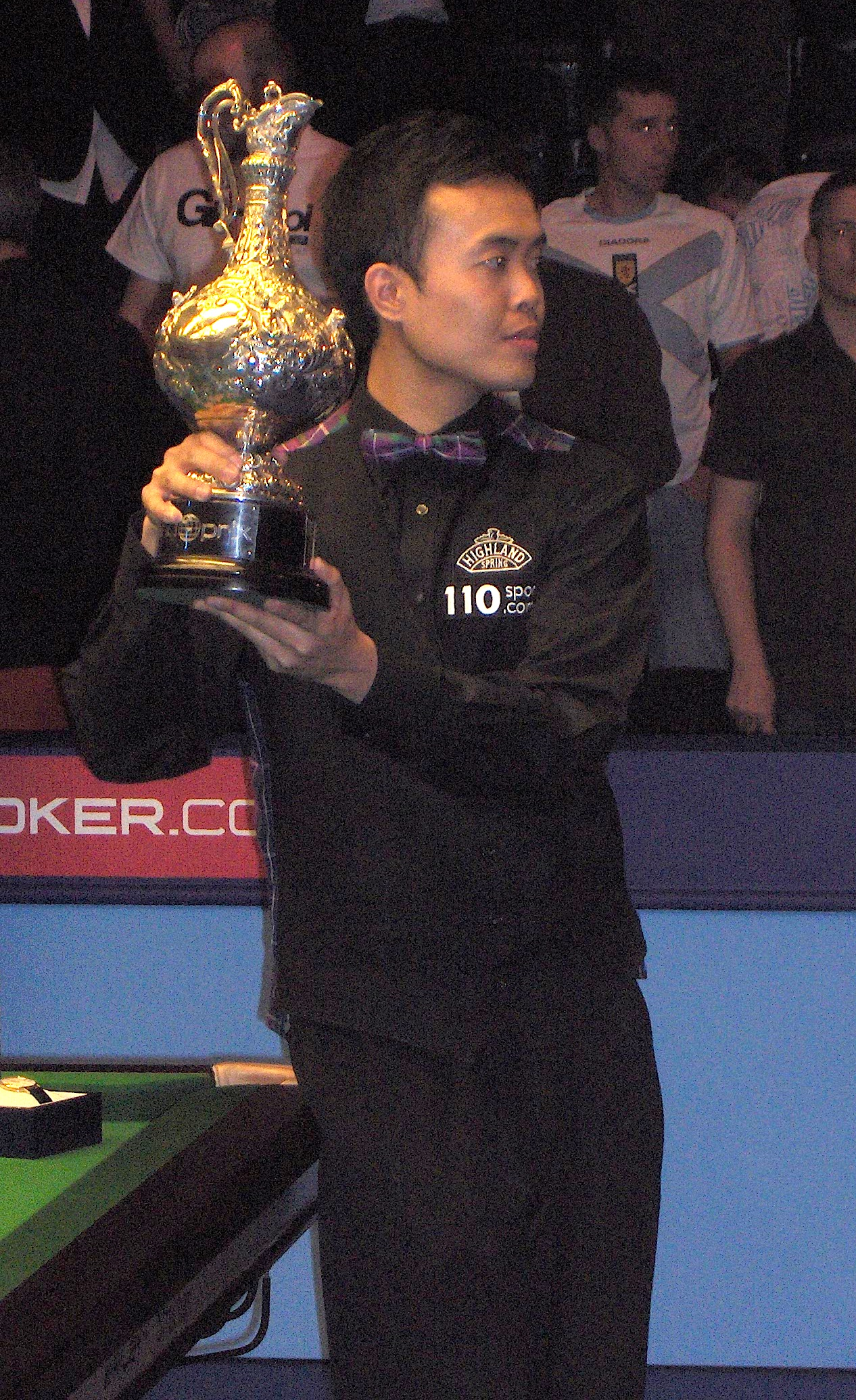
Marco Fu after winning the 2007 Grand Prix

In the 2006–07 season he did not compete in the 2006 UK Championship so he could attend the 2006 Asian Games, where he won two silver medals. At the 2007 World Snooker Championship, Fu lost 3–10 to Anthony Hamilton in the first round. His best result during the season was a quarter-final run in the China Open, where he lost to Ronnie O'Sullivan. Following a first round loss at the Shanghai Masters, and nine years after his first appearance in a ranking final at the 1998 Grand Prix, Fu won the 2007 Grand Prix —his first victory in a ranking event. After defeating the reigning world champion John Higgins in the first knock-out round 5–4, Liu Song 5–0 in the quarter-finals. and Gerard Greene 6–5 in the semi-finals, he faced Ronnie O'Sullivan in the final. After falling 3–4 behind after the first session, he won 9–6, with a break of 76 in the final frame. He later reached the quarter-finals of the 2007 UK Championship, losing to Mark Selby and the semi-finals of the 2008 Masters, losing to Stephen Lee.

He qualified for the 2008 World Snooker Championship, with a 10–3 win over Alan McManus. He played Ding in the first round where he lost 9–10. He capped a successful season by finishing in career high 14th in the rankings, a climb of thirteen places from the previous season.

=== UK Championship finalist (2008–2010) ===
The 2008–09 season started with a last 32 loss to Barry Hawkins in the Northern Ireland Trophy and losing in the quarter-finals of the Shanghai Masters to Mark Selby. At the Grand Prix, he lost in the second round to Ronnie O'Sullivan, a rematch of last season's final. At the 2008 UK Championship, he beat Barry Hawkins in the first round, followed by Matthew Stevens and Joe Perry. In the semi-finals, Fu defeated Ali Carter: after trailing 2–5, he levelled to 6–6 and won 8–6. In the final, Shaun Murphy defeated Fu 9–10. He suffered a first round defeat to John Higgins at the Masters. At the 2009 World Snooker Championship, he advanced to the second round by beating Joe Swail 10–4 before losing 3–13 to Murphy.

In December 2009, Fu participated in the East Asian Games, held in Hong Kong. In the singles competition Yu Delu beat him by 4–1 in the quarter-finals, but he later won a gold medal in the team competition. Fu lost his next three first-round matches. He lost against Peter Lines 3–9 at the 2009 UK Championship, Peter Ebdon 2–6 at the Masters and Andrew Higginson 2–5 at the Welsh Open.

However, Fu won the 2010 Championship League by beating Mark Allen 3–2 in the final. Fu also reached the quarter-finals of the 2010 China Open, where he lost 1–5 against Mark Williams. At the last ranking event of the season, the World Championship, Fu faced Martin Gould in the first round and led 5–4 after the first session. Ultimately Fu lost the match 9–10.

=== Masters finalist (2010–15) ===
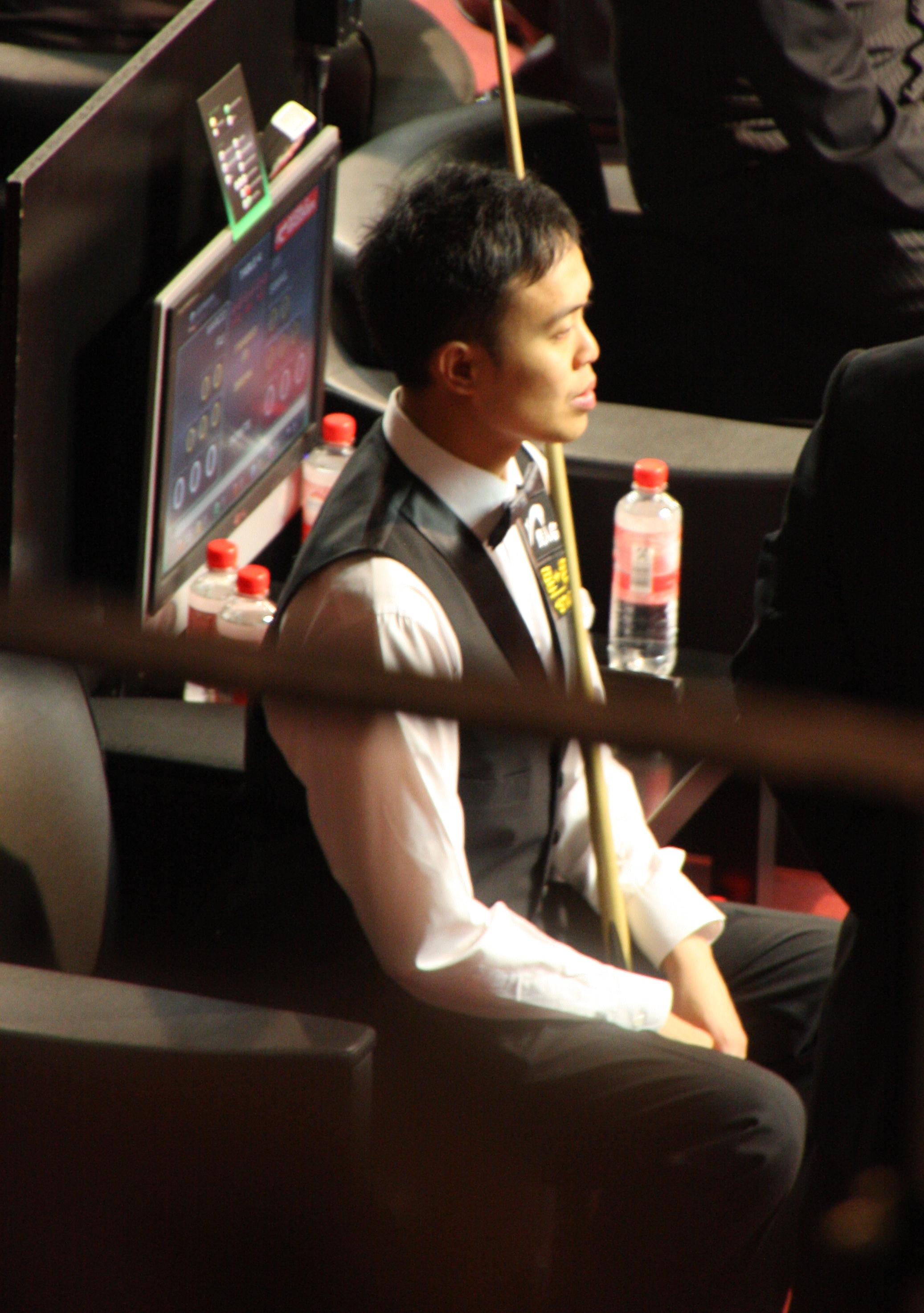
Marco Fu at the 2011 German Masters

In November 2010, Fu participated in the Asian Games, held in Guangzhou. He won the singles competition by defeating Ding Junhui 4–2 in the final. Fu also reached the semi-finals of the Premier League where he lost 2–5 against Shaun Murphy. He lost in the second round of the 2010 UK Championship 2–9 against Stuart Bingham. Fu participated at the Players Tour Championship, where his best results came at the first and second events in Sheffield, where he reached the semi-finals, losing 1–4 against Stephen Maguire and 2–4 against Mark Selby, respectively. He later finished 16th on the Players Tour Championship Order of Merit.

He reached the final of the 2011 Masters, where he lost 4–10 against Ding Junhui. Fu reached the semi-finals of the 2011 German Masters, where he lost 3–6 against Mark Williams. At the 2011 Welsh Open, he was whitewashed by Mark Williams in the last 32, after winning his qualifying match 4–1 against Joe Swail. Fu lost his first round matches at the China Open and World Championship, 3–5 against Judd Trump and 8–10 against Martin Gould, respectively. He finished the season ranked world number 23, the first time he had been outside of the elite top 16 since 2007.

Fu qualified for four of the eight ranking tournaments of the 2011–12 season. At the Welsh Open he lost in the first round 1–4 to Ronnie O'Sullivan and lost in the first round of the World Open following a 3–5 defeat to John Higgins. Fu had earlier made the second maximum break of his career during the final qualifying round for the World Open in a match against Matthew Selt. Fu's best performance of the season came at the 2011 UK Championship. He qualified by beating Anthony Hamilton 6–5 and then saw off Stuart Bingham 6–4 in the first round to set up a last 16 clash with world number one, Mark Selby who he defeated 6–3 and then played Mark Allen in the quarter-finals. Fu led 5–4 in the match, but lost the last two frames to lose 5–6. Fu qualified for the 2012 World Snooker Championship with a 10–4 win over Shailesh Jogia, but lost in the first round of the event 3–10 to Matthew Stevens. As a result, he finished the season ranked world number 28, his lowest position since 2000.

In Australia, Fu saw a return to form as he beat Joe Perry, Jamie Burnett and Stephen Lee all by 5–1 scorelines to reach the semi-finals of the Australian Goldfields Open. There he lost 2–6 to Peter Ebdon and said after the match that his goal for the season was to reclaim a top 16 place. At the International Championship he secured wins over Martin Gould and Mark Davis to reach the quarter-finals. Fu let a 3–1 lead against Shaun Murphy slip to lose 4–6. Before he played Mark Allen in the first round of the 2012 UK Championship, Allen reiterated his views that Fu had cheated in a prior match. Fu himself denied the claims and went on to defeat Allen 6–3. Allen received a three-month suspended ban for his comments. In the second round Fu lost 4–6 to Matthew Stevens. He reached his first ranking event final since 2008 at the German Masters by beating Ricky Walden, Peter Lines and Matthew Stevens all 5–3. His semi-final against Barry Hawkins included a near hour-long battle of safety play, with Fu edging the match 6–4 just after midnight. Fu led Ali Carter 5–3 after the opening session of the final, but on the resumption of play did not pot a ball for 86 minutes and lost 6–9. Following this, Fu lost in the second round of the World Open to Ding Junhui and in the first rounds of the Welsh Open and the China Open to Allen and Graeme Dott respectively.

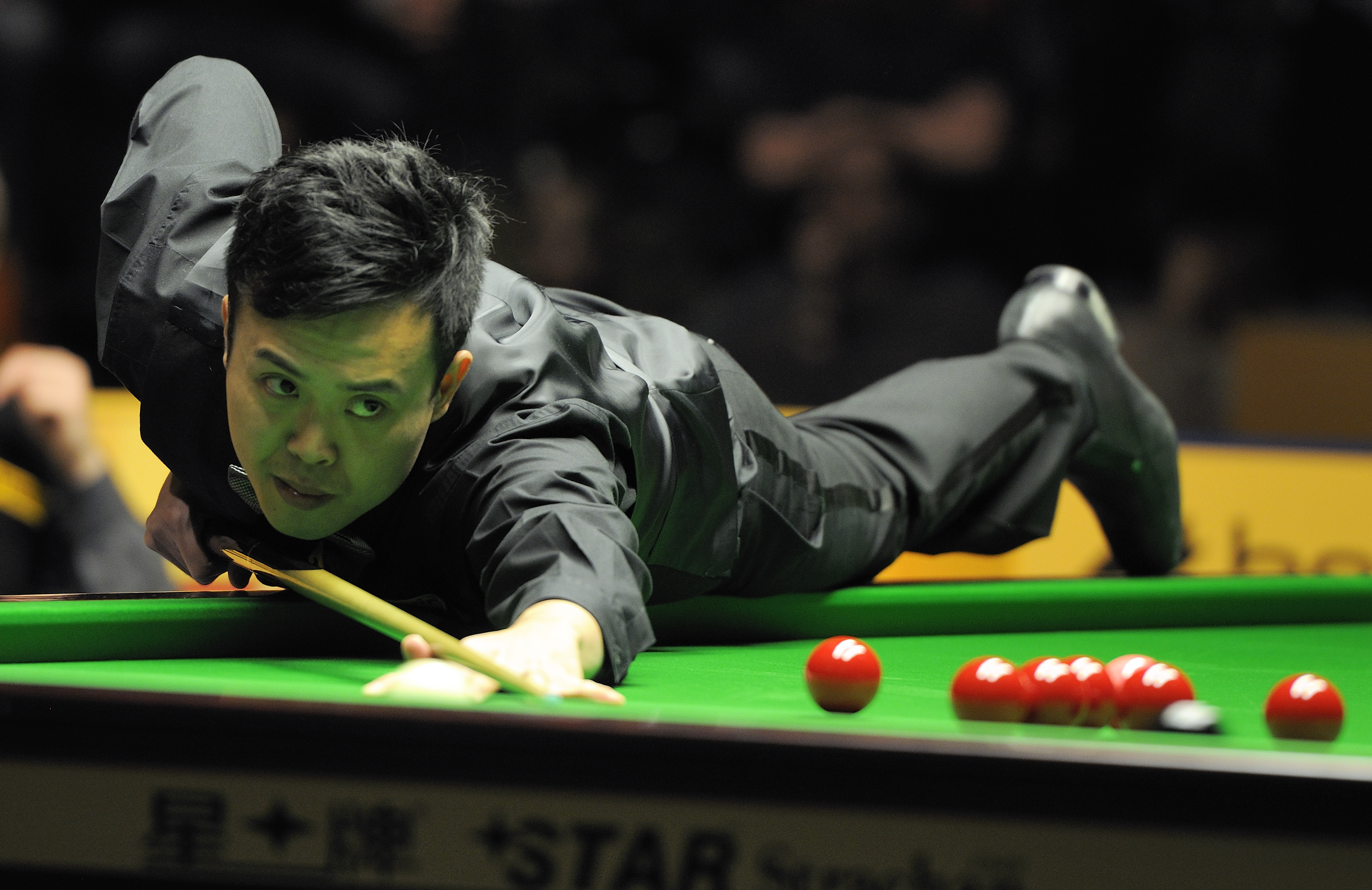
Fu at the 2013 German Masters

Fu played in seven minor-ranking Players Tour Championship events and reached the final of the Third Event by defeating veteran players Stephen Maguire, Mark Williams, Ali Carter and Shaun Murphy. He lost to world number 65 Rod Lawler 2–4 in the final. He also reached the quarter-finals of the European Tour Event 3, which helped him finish 21st on the Order of Merit to qualify for the Finals. In the Finals Fu beat Mark Joyce and Carter, before losing 1–4 to Tom Ford in the quarter-finals. Fu won Group 7 of the Championship League courtesy of a 3–0 victory over Maguire and in the Winners Group lost in the semi-finals 0–3 to Carter. In the first round of the World Championship, Fu beat Matthew Stevens 10–7 to face Judd Trump in the last 16. He fell 2–6 behind after the first session, but fought back to trail only 7–8 before losing five consecutive frames to end his season with a 7–13 defeat. Fu finished just short of his early season goal to get back into the top 16 as he finished world number 17, but this did mean he had climbed 11 spots during the year.

The Wuxi Classic was Fu's first ranking event of the 2013–14 season; he lost 4–5 to Mark King in the second round. He then played in the Australian Goldfields Open where he defeated Ken Doherty 5–2, Shaun Murphy 5–2 and Dominic Dale 5–1. In the semi-finals he built a 4–1 lead over Robert Milkins and later won 6–4. Fu faced world number one Neil Robertson in the final, defeating him 9–6 to take the second ranking event title of his career and regain his place in the top 16 of the world rankings. Another final followed at the minor-ranking Bluebell Wood Open, with Fu fighting back from 1–3 down against Ricky Walden to square the match at 3–3 before Walden fluked a pot in the deciding frame to win. Fu then lost in the second round of both the Shanghai Masters 5–3 to Kyren Wilson and the Indian Open 4–3 to Gary Wilson. He advanced to the quarter-finals of the International Championship where he played Mark Selby. Fu came back from 5–3 down to take the match 6–5 with consecutive breaks of 84 and 112 in the final frame before defeating Joe Perry 9–8 in the semi-final. In the final, Fu won an hour long frame to hold a 9–8 advantage over his opponent Ding Junhui, but lost the match 9–10.

Fu then suffered defeats in the first round of the 2013 UK Championship and German Masters to Mitchell Travis and Paul Davison respectively. However, he reached the quarter-finals of the Welsh Open where Barry Hawkins whitewashed him 5–0. Fu beat world number one Neil Robertson in the last 16 of the World Open 5–4 on a re-spotted black and eliminated Mark Joyce 5–3 in the next round. In the semi-finals he won three successive frames from 5–1 down against Mark Selby but lost the next frame to be beaten 6–4. Another semi-final followed at the PTC Finals with a 4–1 victory against John Higgins in the quarters, however, he suffered a 4–2 defeat against Gerard Greene. Fu lost 13–8 to Shaun Murphy in the second round of the World Championship.

In the 2014–15 season, Fu reached seven quarter-finals. His first came in the opening ranking event, the Wuxi Classic, where he lost 5–4 to Barry Hawkins. He was knocked out in the first round of the Shanghai Masters. He saw off Liam Highfield, David Gilbert and Rod Lawler at the International Championship, before a ranking event quarter-final went the distance for the second time this season as Fu lost 6–5 to Robert Milkins. Ronnie O'Sullivan whitewashed him 6–0 in the last eight of the non-ranking Champion of Champions. Another quarter-final followed at the 2014 UK Championship after Fu came back from 5–3 down to eliminate Shaun Murphy 6–5, with both players criticising the condition of the table after the match. Stephen Maguire knocked him out 6–4.

At the Masters, Fu made his third competitive maximum break in his first-round match against Stuart Bingham beating him 6–3 to advance to the sixth quarter-final of his season, where he lost to O'Sullivan him 6–1. His final quarter-final exit of the season came in the Welsh Open 5–1 at the hands of Mark Williams. For the ninth successive season, Fu could not progress past the second round of the World Championship as Judd Trump defeated him 13–8.

=== Later career (2015–2019) ===
After exiting the first two ranking events of the 2015–16 season at the first round stage, Fu met David Gilbert in the quarter-finals of the International Championship but lost 5–6 after leading 4–2. He won the non-ranking General Cup by beating Mark Williams 7–3. Fu eliminated Shaun Murphy in the fourth round of the 2015 UK Championship for the second year in a row. Liang Wenbo opened their quarter-final match with three successive centuries, but Fu fought back to send the tie to a deciding frame which he lost. En route to the final of the Gibraltar Open, Fu made a maximum break in the second round against Sam Baird. Fu won his first title carrying ranking points since the 2013 Australian Open by eliminating Michael White 4–1 in the final. In the 2016 World Championship, Fu saw off Peter Ebdon, Anthony McGill and Barry Hawkins to reach the semi-final for the second time but eventually lost to Selby 17–15.

After enduring a difficult start to the 2016–17 season where he failed to get beyond the second round of the first eight ranking events, Fu came back from 5–2 down to defeat Jamie Jones in the quarter-finals of the UK Championship. Leading 5–4 against Ronnie O'Sullivan in the semi-finals, he lost the final two frames to lose 5–6. Before the end of 2016, Fu reached the final of the Scottish Open, with his closest game being a 4–3 victory over Neil Robertson in the fourth round; Fu did not lose more than a frame in his other five matches. In the final against John Higgins, trailing 1–4, he won eight frames in a row to win the match 9–4. Throughout the tournament, Fu made 11 centuries and 21 more breaks over 50 in seven matches.

At the 2017 Masters, he played Judd Trump in the opening round and won 6–5. He beat Mark Allen in the quarter-finals 6–2 and then lost 6–4 to O'Sullivan in the semi-finals. Fu also played in the semi-finals of the World Grand Prix and was 4–3 up on Ryan Day, who needed four snookers in the eighth frame. He got them to square the match and then overcame Fu 4–6. At the Players Championship, Fu defeated Anthony McGill 5–1 and Mark Selby 5–2, before coming back from 5–3 down against Ding Junhui to win 6–5 and reach the final. From 5–2 up on Trump, Fu lost six frames in a row and would be beaten 8–10. Fu had a poor start to his first round match at the World Championship as he was 7–1 down to Luca Brecel, though he made a century to be 7–2 behind overnight. He won the first two frames upon the resumption of play and eventually levelled at 8–8, later winning 10–9. The second round saw Fu play Neil Robertson, They tied at 4–4, 8–8, and 10–10. Fu lost frame 21 but won the next three to win 13–11. Fu was then defeated 13–3 by defending and eventual champion Selby, losing with a session to spare. However, he was ranked sixth after the event, the highest Fu has ever finished a season in his career.

The 2017–18 season saw Marco Fu getting off to another difficult start, as he could not reach the quarter final of any ranking event before the turn of the year. Two weeks after suffering a 0–6 defeat against Ronnie O'Sullivan in the first round of the Masters, Fu revealed that he had undergone laser eye surgery in December to treat retinal degeneration and floaters in his dominant left eye. Fu indicated he regretted taking part in the Masters while still recovering from the surgery. He also announced that he would not enter any more tournaments before making a full recovery and regaining his old level in training. He made his return at the 2018 World Snooker Championship where he lost to Lyu Haotian 5–10.

Following the eye surgery, Fu only reached the quarter-finals of the 2018 World Open, where he lost to David Gilbert, and the 2020 European Masters, losing to Gary Wilson.

=== COVID-19 pandemic, career revival, 16-red total clearance (2020-present) ===
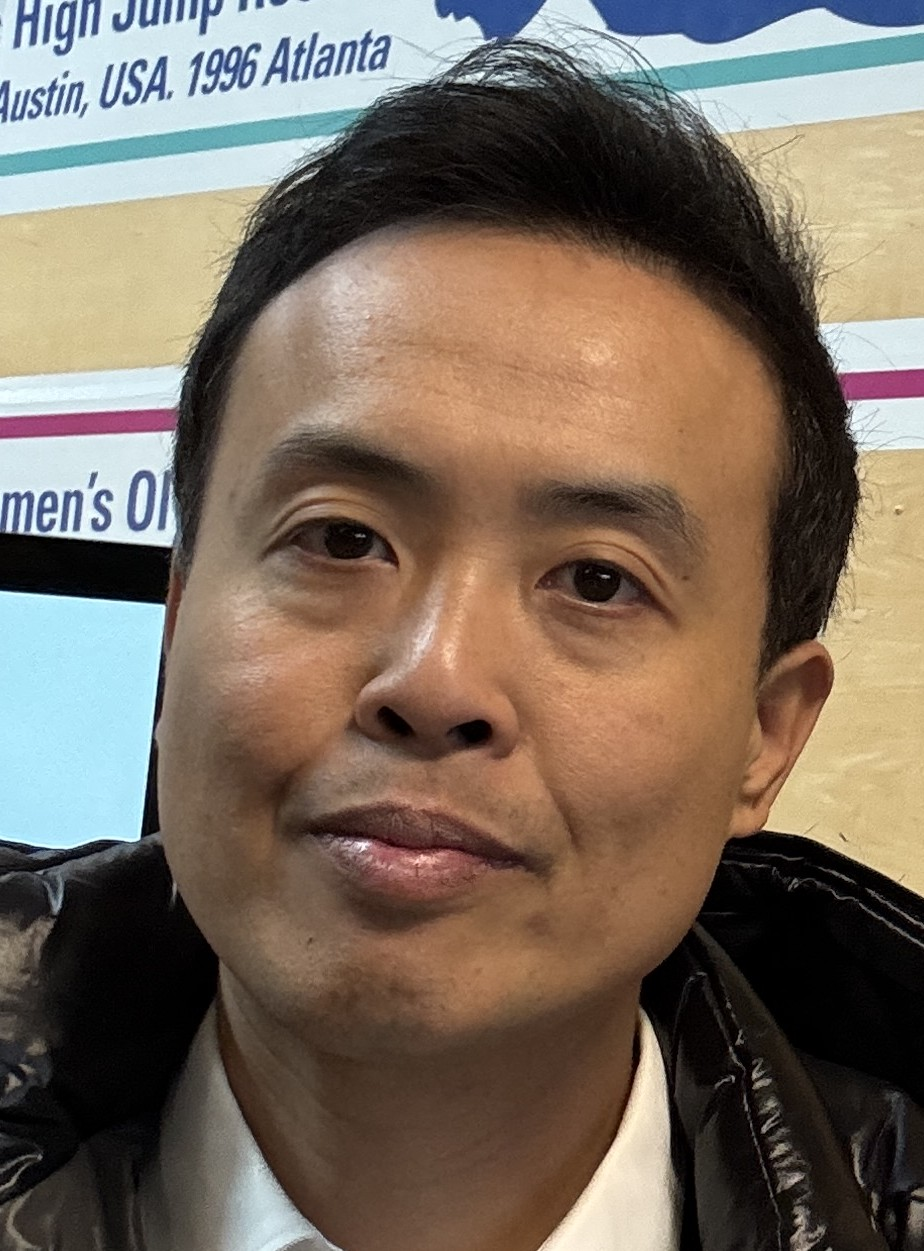
Marco Fu at the 2026 World Snooker Championship qualifying competition

In February 2020, Fu returned to Hong Kong because of the COVID-19 pandemic, with his last appearance being at the 2020 Welsh Open where he lost to Ding in the opening round. As a consequence of not entering any events during the rest of the season, his ranking steadily dropped out of the Top 64, but an offer of an invitational tour card meant he would not need to qualify to rejoin the tour as a result.

Fu returned to compete in professional snooker tournaments at the 2022 World Snooker Championship, marking the first event since the 2020 Welsh Open in which he played in an event on the main tour. He lost in the first round of qualifying, being defeated in a deciding frame by Ian Burns. As travel restrictions eased in Hong Kong, Fu proceeded to compete in the subsequent 2022-23 season where he did not top his group in the opening event, the 2022 Championship League. He had managed to qualify for the 2022 European Masters and reached the third round, consequently as a result of a bye due to his opponent in the second round not getting a visa, where he lost 5-3 to Farakh Ajaib. He did not qualify for the subsequent 2022 British Open or the 2022 Northern Ireland Open, but was invited to compete as a local wildcard in the 2022 Hong Kong Masters, where he reached the final. In his semi-final match against John Higgins, he compiled his fifth maximum break in the deciding frame.

At the end of the 2022-23 season, Fu was awarded a new two-year invitational tour card. During his 2025 World Championship second round qualifying match against Ben Mertens he became only the seventh player, and second in a world championship contest, to make a 16-red total clearance, compiling 139 after being awarded a free ball following a foul by his opponent in frame four. Having finished the 2024-25 season ranked outside the world's top-64 at number 70, Fu faced losing his place on the tour but was awarded a further two-year invitational card.

== Status and records ==
Fu is a prolific break-builder, having made his 500th century break at the 2019 Scottish Open. He achieved a maximum break on five occasions, at the 2000 Scottish Masters, the qualifying stages for the 2012 World Open, the 2015 Masters, the 2015 Gibraltar Open and the 2022 Hong Kong Masters . Fu has also made a break of 148 after receiving a free ball in an exhibition match in 2020.

He once held the record for the longest frame in the history of televised snooker. The record of 77 minutes, held with Mark Selby, was played out in the decisive final frame during the quarter-final match at the 2007 UK Championship held in Telford, England. Fu eventually lost the match 7–9. However, the record was then broken by Shaun Murphy and Dave Harold in a match at the China Open later in the same season, with a frame of 93 minutes. As of 2022, the record, held by Fergal O'Brien and David Gilbert, stands at 123 minutes and 41 seconds.

Fu won the Medal of Honour in 2000.

== Personal life ==
Fu was educated in Vancouver, British Columbia, Canada and has lived for a time in England, Wales and Scotland. He married in 2011 and has two daughters, born in 2012 and 2015. His wife and daughters returned to Hong Kong in 2016 to facilitate their education. On June 30, 2017, Fu was appointed by the Chief Executive of the Hong Kong Special Administrative Region as a Justice of the Peace.

Fu is a Buddhist due to influence from his mother, and has become a vegetarian since 2003. Fu hosted a ten-episode series on Hong Kong's ViuTV entitled Marco Fu and Friends, with the format of an informal chat show with Hong Kong celebrities and playing a frame of snooker with them.

== Performance and rankings timeline ==
Tournament	1997/ 98	1998/ 99	1999/ 00	2000/ 01	2001/ 02	2002/ 03	2003/ 04		2004/ 05	2005/ 06	2006/ 07	2007/ 08	2008/ 09	2009/ 10	2010/ 11	2011/ 12	2012/ 13	2013/ 14	2014/ 15	2015/ 16	2016/ 17	2017/ 18	2018/ 19	2019/ 20	2020/ 21	2021/ 22	2022/ 23	2023/ 24	2024/ 25	2025/ 26	2026/ 27
Ranking (Note: It shows the ranking at the beginning of the season)	(Note: He was an amateur)	(Note: New players don't have a ranking)	35	15	17	27	19		16	25	22	27	14	8	14	23	28	17	8	11	12	5	18	55	50	(Note: Players issued an invitational tour card began the season without ranking points)	94		68		69
Ranking tournaments
Championship League	Tournament Not Held											Non-Ranking Event													A	A	RR	WD	RR	A	2R
China Open (Note: The event was called the China International (1997/1998–1998/1999))	NR	LQ	1R	2R	2R	Not Held			QF	LQ	QF	2R	1R	QF	1R	LQ	1R	2R	2R	3R	LQ	A	1R	Tournament Not Held							LQ
Wuhan Open	Tournament Not Held																											1R	2R	2R	LQ
British Open	A	1R	1R	2R	2R	2R	2R		2R	Tournament Not Held																A	LQ	LQ	2R	1R	LQ
English Open	Tournament Not Held																				2R	1R	2R	2R	A	A	2R	LQ	LQ	1R	LQ
Shenzhen Open (Note: The event was called the Xi'an Grand Prix (2024/2025–2025/2026))	Tournament Not Held																												A	WD	LQ
Northern Ireland Open	Tournament Not Held																				2R	A	1R	2R	A	A	LQ	1R	WD	WD	LQ
International Championship	Tournament Not held																QF	F	QF	QF	2R	LQ	2R	A	Not Held			2R	LQ	LQ	QF
UK Championship	A	2R	2R	3R	2R	3R	1R		2R	2R	WD	QF	F	1R	2R	QF	2R	1R	QF	QF	SF	3R	3R	3R	A	A	LQ	LQ	LQ	WD	
Shoot Out	Tournament Not Held														Non-Ranking Event						A	A	A	A	A	A	WD	A	A	WD	
Scottish Open (Note: The event was called the Players Championship (2003/2004))	A	LQ	SF	2R	1R	1R	2R		Tournament Not held								MR	Not Held			W	4R	2R	3R	A	A	A	WD	A	WD	LQ
German Masters (Note: The event was called the German Open (1997/1998))	A	NR	Tournament Not Held												SF	LQ	F	1R	LQ	1R	1R	A	LQ	LQ	A	A	LQ	WD	LQ	LQ	
Welsh Open	A	2R	3R	2R	LQ	SF	SF		3R	1R	1R	2R	QF	1R	1R	1R	1R	QF	QF	4R	2R	A	2R	1R	A	A	LQ	3R	1R	LQ	
World Grand Prix	Tournament Not Held																		NR	1R	SF	DNQ	2R	DNQ	DNQ	DNQ	DNQ	DNQ	DNQ	DNQ	
Players Championship (Note: The event was called the Players Tour Championship Grand Final (2010/2011–2015/2016))	Tournament Not Held														1R	DNQ	QF	SF	1R	2R	F	DNQ	DNQ	DNQ	DNQ	DNQ	DNQ	DNQ	DNQ	DNQ	
World Open (Note: The event was called the Grand Prix (1997/1998–2000/2001 and 2004/2005–2009/2010) and the LG Cup (2001/2002–2003/2004))	A	F	QF	2R	3R	1R	3R		3R	1R	RR	W	2R	1R	1R	1R	2R	SF	Not Held		1R	2R	QF	1R	Not Held			LQ	LQ	3R	
Tour Championship	Tournament Not Held																						DNQ	DNQ	DNQ	DNQ	DNQ	DNQ	DNQ	DNQ	
World Championship	LQ	1R	1R	1R	LQ	QF	LQ		1R	SF	1R	1R	2R	1R	1R	1R	2R	2R	2R	SF	QF	1R	LQ	A	A	LQ	LQ	LQ	LQ	LQ	
Non-ranking tournaments
Champion of Champions	Tournament Not Held																	1R	QF	A	WD	1R	A	A	A	A	A	A	A	A	
The Masters	A	A	WR	WR	A	A	A		WR	LQ	LQ	SF	1R	1R	F	A	A	QF	QF	1R	SF	1R	A	A	A	A	A	A	A	A	
Championship League	Tournament Not Held											A	A	W	RR	A	SF	RR	RR	RR	A	A	A	A	A	A	A	A	A	A	
Former ranking tournaments
Malta Grand Prix	Non-Ranking		SF	NR	Tournament Not Held																										
Thailand Masters	1R	LQ	LQ	1R	1R	NR	Tournament Not Held				NR	Tournament Not Held																			
Irish Masters	Non-Ranking Event					LQ	2R		1R	NH	NR	Tournament Not Held																			
Northern Ireland Trophy	Tournament Not Held									NR	1R	1R	2R	Tournament Not Held																	
Bahrain Championship	Tournament Not Held												1R	Tournament Not Held																	
Wuxi Classic (Note: The event was called the Jiangsu Classic (2008/2009–2009/2010))	Tournament Not Held												Non-Ranking Event				LQ	2R	QF	Tournament Not Held											
Australian Goldfields Open	Tournament Not Held															A	SF	W	A	1R	Tournament Not Held										
Shanghai Masters	Tournament Not Held											1R	QF	2R	1R	LQ	WR	2R	1R	1R	1R	3R	Non-Ranking		Not Held			Non-Ranking Event			
Riga Masters (Note: The event was called the Riga Open (2014/2015–2015/2016))	Tournament Not Held																		Minor-Rank		1R	A	2R	A	Tournament Not Held						
China Championship	Tournament Not Held																				NR	2R	1R	1R	Tournament Not Held						
WST Classic	Tournament Not Held																										1R	Tournament Not Held			
European Masters (Note: The event was called the Irish Open (1998/1999), European Open (2001/2002–2003/2004) and the Malta Cup (2004/2005–2007/2008))	NH	LQ	Not Held		LQ	1R	1R		LQ	1R	2R	NR	Tournament Not Held								1R	A	1R	QF	A	A	2R	LQ	Not Held		
Saudi Arabia Masters	Tournament Not Held																												3R	1R	NH
Former non-ranking tournaments
Super Challenge	NH	RR	Tournament Not Held																												
Millennium Cup	Not Held		QF	Tournament Not Held																											
Champions Cup (Note: The event was called the Charity Challenge (1997/1998–1998/1999))	A	QF	A	A	A	Tournament Not Held																									
Scottish Masters	A	A	LQ	1R	SF	A	Tournament Not Held																								
World Champions v Asia Stars	Tournament Not Held								W	Tournament Not Held																					
Thailand Masters	Ranking Event					A	Not Held				W	Tournament Not Held																			
Euro-Asia Masters Challenge	Tournament Not Held						RR	F	Not Held			SF	Tournament Not Held																		
Malta Cup	Tournament Not Held				Ranking Event							RR	Tournament Not Held								Ranking Event										
Huangshan Cup	Tournament Not Held											F	Tournament Not Held																		
Beijing International Challenge	Tournament Not Held													RR	RR	Tournament Not Held															
Wuxi Classic	Tournament Not Held												A	SF	QF	A	Ranking Event			Tournament Not Held											
Premier League	A	A	RR	SF	A	W	SF		SF	A	A	A	A	RR	SF	A	A	Tournament Not Held													
World Grand Prix	Tournament Not Held																		1R	Ranking Event											
General Cup (Note: The event was called the General Cup International (2004/2005–2011/2012))	Tournament Not Held								A	Tournament Not Held				RR	NH	RR	A	SF	RR	W	Tournament Not Held										
Shoot Out	Tournament Not Held														1R	1R	A	A	A	1R	Ranking Event										
China Championship	Tournament Not Held																				QF	Ranking Event			Tournament Not Held						
Macau Masters	Tournament Not Held																						RR	Tournament Not Held							
Hong Kong Masters	Tournament Not Held																					SF	Tournament Not Held				F	Tournament Not Held			
Six-red World Championship (Note: The event was called the Six-red Snooker International (2008/2009) and the Six-red World Grand Prix (2009/2010))	Tournament Not Held												A	A	A	NH	2R	A	A	QF	A	SF	2R	A	Not Held		LQ	Tournament Not Held			

Performance Table Legend
LQ	lost in the qualifying draw	#R	lost in the early rounds of the tournament (WR = Wildcard round, RR = Round robin)	QF	lost in the quarter-finals
SF	lost in the semi-finals	F	lost in the final	W	won the tournament
DNQ	did not qualify for the tournament	A	did not participate in the tournament	WD	withdrew from the tournament

NH / Not Held	means an event was not held.
NR / Non-Ranking Event	means an event is/was no longer a ranking event.
R / Ranking Event	means an event is/was a ranking event.
MR / Minor-Ranking Event	means an event is/was a minor-ranking event.
PA / Pro-am Event	means an event is/was a pro-am event.

== Career finals ==
Below is a list of finals contested by Fu.

=== Ranking finals: 8 (3 titles) ===
Legend
UK Championship (0–1)
Other (3–4)

Outcome	No.	Year	Championship	Opponent in the final	Score
Runner-up	1.	1998	Grand Prix	(England) Stephen Lee	2–9
Winner	1.	2007	Grand Prix	(England) Ronnie O'Sullivan	9–6
Runner-up	2.	2008	UK Championship	(England) Shaun Murphy	9–10
Runner-up	3.	2013	German Masters	(England) Ali Carter	6–9
Winner	2.	2013	Australian Goldfields Open	(Australia) Neil Robertson	9–6
Runner-up	4.	2013	International Championship	(China) Ding Junhui	9–10
Winner	3.	2016	Scottish Open	(Scotland) John Higgins	9–4
Runner-up	5.	2017	Players Championship	(England) Judd Trump	8–10

=== Minor-ranking finals: 3 (1 title) ===
Outcome	No.	Year	Championship	Opponent in the final	Score
Runner-up	1.	2012	UK PTC Event 3	(England) Rod Lawler	2–4
Runner-up	2.	2013	Bluebell Wood Open	(England) Ricky Walden	3–4
Winner	1.	2015	Gibraltar Open	(Wales) Michael White	4–1

=== Non-ranking finals: 10 (6 titles) ===
Legend
The Masters (0–1)
Other (6–3)

Outcome	No.	Year	Championship	Opponent in the final	Score
Winner	1.	1998	Guangzhou Masters	(Malaysia) Sam Chong	6–5
Winner	2.	2003	Premier League	(Wales) Mark Williams	9–5
Runner-up	1.	2003	Euro-Asia Masters Challenge – Event 2	(Republic of Ireland) Ken Doherty	2–5
Winner	3.	2004	World Champions v Asia Stars Challenge	(Scotland) John Higgins	5–1
Winner	4.	2006	Thailand Masters	(Thailand) Issara Kachaiwong	5–3
Runner-up	2.	2008	Huangshan Cup	(England) Ali Carter	3–5
Winner	5.	2010	Championship League	(Northern Ireland) Mark Allen	3–2
Runner-up	3.	2011	The Masters	(China) Ding Junhui	4–10
Winner	6.	2015	General Cup	(Wales) Mark Williams	7–3
Runner-up	4.	2022	Hong Kong Masters	(England) Ronnie O'Sullivan	4–6

=== Pro–am finals: 1 (1 title) ===
Outcome	No.	Year	Championship	Opponent in the final	Score
Winner	1.	2010	Asian Games	(China) Ding Junhui	4–2

=== Team finals: 1 ===
Outcome	No.	Year	Championship	Team/partner	Opponent(s) in the final	Score
Runner-up	1.	2018	Macau Masters	(England) Joe Perry (China) Zhang Anda (Wales) Mark Williams	(England) Barry Hawkins (Wales) Ryan Day (China) Zhao Xintong (China) Zhou Yuelong	1–5

=== Amateur finals: 2 (2 titles) ===
Outcome	No.	Year	Championship	Opponent in the final	Score	Ref
Winner	1.	1997	IBSF World Under-21 Championship	(Belgium) Bjorn Haneveer	11–7	
Winner	2.	1997	IBSF World Amateur Championship	(England) Stuart Bingham	11–10	
