= Marco Fu and Friends =

- 約咗傅家俊
- Genre: Talk
- Created by: HK Television Entertainment Company Limited
- Starring: Marco Fu
- Country of origin: Hong Kong
- Original language: Cantonese
- No. of episodes: 10

Production
- Executive producer: Yeung Yam Ho
- Editor: Lo Sai Hung
- Running time: 30 minutes (including ads)
- Production company: ViuTV

Original release
- Network: ViuTV
- Release: 3 July – 4 September 2017

Marco Fu And Friends (Chinese: 約咗傅家俊; literally "Have an appointment with Marco Fu") is a chat and interview show produced by HK Television Entertainment Company Limited, aired from July 3, 2017, to September 4, 2017, every Monday from 22:30 to 23:00 on ViuTV Channel 99, hosted by Marco Fu, sponsored by Okamoto Industries.

Each episode, Fu invites different guests to interview them, and to play a round of snooker with them (on episode 5 he played pool), and seeing if the guests are able to beat the professional snooker player.

The show starts with a minigame to determine the guests' snooker ability, then from the performance of the minigame Fu decides the number of points the guests get for handicap. After that he chats to the guest and at the end of the episode he discusses ways to improve the guests' snooker ability.

== Episode overview ==
Episode	Air date	Theme	Guest	Handicap	Winner	Final Score	Source
1	July 3	Idols	Alan Tam	80	Alan Tam	79-103	
2	July 10	Interpersonal Relationships	Edmond Leung	75	Marco Fu	115-86	
3	July 17	Playfullness	Julian Cheung	60	Marco Fu	108-71	
4	July 24	Childhood	Andy Hui	50	Marco Fu	97-75	
5	July 31	Art Life	Mark Lui	－	Marco Fu	Both rounds won by Marco Fu	
6	August 7	Sporting days	Alex Fong	60	Marco Fu	75-71	
7	August 14	Way of life	Lam Suet	85	Marco Fu	110-85	
8	August 21	Entrepreneurship	Edmond So	80	Marco Fu	94-89	
9	August 28	Living life	Wong Yuk-man	80	Marco Fu	97-92	
10	September 4	Self-cultivation	Ronald Cheng	100	Ronald Cheng	95-121	
