= 2015 General Cup =

General Cup
Tournament information
- Dates: 16–21 November 2015
- Venue: General Snooker Club
- Country: Hong Kong
- Format: Non-ranking event
- Winner's share: $120,000
- Highest break: (Hong Kong) Marco Fu (136) (England) Martin Gould (136)

Final
- Champion: (Hong Kong) Marco Fu
- Runner-up: (Wales) Mark Williams
- Score: 7–3

The 2015 General Cup was a professional non-ranking snooker tournament that took place between 16 and 21 November 2015 at the General Snooker Club in Hong Kong.

Ali Carter was the defending champion but he withdrew from the tournament. Kyren Wilson withdrew as well and they were replaced by Michael Holt and Mark Davis.

Zhang Anda won the General Cup Qualifying Event. Anda beat Cao Yupeng 5–4 in the final. This was an invitational event with the winner receiving the final place in the General Cup.

Marco Fu beat Mark Williams 7–3 in the final, making 3 centuries while doing so.

== Prize fund ==
The breakdown of prize money for this year is shown below:

- Winner: $120,000
- Runner-up: $60,000
- Semi-final: $40,000
- Third in group: $25,000
- Fourth in group: $20,000
- Per century break: $2,000
- Highest break: $20,000

== Round robin stage ==
The top two players from both groups qualified for the knock-out stage. All group matches being held between 16 and 19 November 2015 and is the best of 7 frames.

=== Group A ===
| Pos. | Player | MP | MW | ML | FW | FL | FD | Pts |
|---|---|---|---|---|---|---|---|---|
| 1 | (Wales) Michael White | 3 | 2 | 1 | 10 | 6 | +4 | 2 |
| 2 | (China) Zhang Anda | 3 | 2 | 1 | 11 | 8 | +3 | 2 |
| 3 | (England) Joe Perry | 3 | 1 | 2 | 8 | 9 | –1 | 1 |
| 4 | (England) Martin Gould | 3 | 1 | 2 | 5 | 11 | –6 | 1 |

- Martin Gould 4–3 Zhang Anda
- Joe Perry 2–4 Zhang Anda
- Michael White 4–0 Martin Gould
- Joe Perry 4–1 Martin Gould
- Michael White 2–4 Zhang Anda
- Joe Perry 2–4 Michael White

=== Group B ===
| Pos. | Player | MP | MW | ML | FW | FL | FD | Pts |
|---|---|---|---|---|---|---|---|---|
| 1 | (Hong Kong) Marco Fu | 3 | 2 | 1 | 9 | 6 | +3 | 2 |
| 2 | (Wales) Mark Williams | 3 | 2 | 1 | 8 | 5 | +3 | 2 |
| 3 | (England) Michael Holt | 3 | 1 | 2 | 6 | 9 | –3 | 1 |
| 4 | (England) Mark Davis | 3 | 1 | 2 | 6 | 9 | –3 | 1 |

- Marco Fu 4–0 Mark Williams
- Marco Fu 1–4 Mark Davis
- Mark Williams 4–0 Michael Holt
- Mark Davis 1–4 Michael Holt
- Mark Williams 4–1 Mark Davis
- Marco Fu 4–2 Michael Holt

== Knock-out stage ==
Semi-finals (Best of 11 frames); 20 November
(Wales) Michael White | 1
(Wales) Mark Williams | 6
(Hong Kong) Marco Fu | 6
(China) Zhang Anda | 3

Final (Best of 13 frames); 21 November
(Wales) Mark Williams | 3
(Hong Kong) Marco Fu | 7

Final: Best of 13 frames. Referee: Stanley Cheung. General Snooker Club, Hong Kong, 21 November 2015.
| Mark Williams; Wales | 3–7 | Marco Fu; Hong Kong |
3–60, 55–74, 102–17 (72), 0–140 (136), 8–119 (119), 23–77, 86–0 (62), 62–63, 88–25 (82), 0–124 (124)
| 82 | Highest break | 136 |
| 0 | Century breaks | 3 |
| 3 | 50+ breaks | 3 |

== Century breaks ==
- 136, 128, 124, 119, 111, 101 – Marco Fu
- 136, 135 – Martin Gould
- 109, 107, 104 – Mark Davis
- 108 – Michael White
