= European Tour 2013/2014 – Event 3 =

European Tour 2013/2014 Event 3

Tournament information
- Dates: 14–17 August 2013
- Venue: Doncaster Dome
- City: Doncaster
- Country: England
- Organisation: World Snooker
- Format: Minor-ranking event
- Total prize fund: £100,400
- Winner's share: £20,000
- Highest break: Ding Junhui (CHN) (146)

Final
- Champion: Ricky Walden (ENG)
- Runner-up: Marco Fu (HKG)
- Score: 4–3

The European Tour 2013/2014 – Event 3 (also known as the 2013 Bluebell Wood Open) was a professional minor-ranking snooker tournament that took place between 14 and 17 August 2013 at the Doncaster Dome in Doncaster, England.

Ricky Walden won his fourth professional title by defeating Marco Fu 4–3 in the final.

Ronnie O'Sullivan made the 700th century of his career in first round match against Lyu Haotian. Lyu led 3–1 but O'Sullivan came back to win 4–3, making his 700th century in the deciding frame.

== Prize fund and ranking points ==
The breakdown of prize money and ranking points of the event is shown below:

	Prize fund	Ranking points^{1}
Winner	£20,000	2,000
Runner-up	£10,000	1,600
Semi-finalist	£5,000	1,280
Quarter-finalist	£2,500	1,000
Last 16	£1,700	760
Last 32	£1,100	560
Last 64	£600	360
Total	£100,400	–

- ^{1} Only professional players can earn ranking points.

== Main draw ==
=== Preliminary rounds ===
==== Round 1 ====
Best of 7 frames

(Scotland) Rhys Clark	4–1	(Republic of Ireland) Josh Boileau
(England) Ryan Causton	4–0	(England) Wayne Townsend
(England) Michael Wild	3–4	(Wales) Jimmy Carney
(England) Michael Georgiou	w/o–n/s	(China) Chen Wen
(Wales) Khishan Hirani	4–3	(Australia) Jamie Brown
(Pakistan) Shokat Ali	2–4	(Malta) Aaron Busuttil
(England) Brandon Sargeant	4–2	(Scotland) Ross Higgins

(England) Arun Mehta	1–4	(England) Adam Bobat
(England) Stephen Groves	0–4	(England) Sam Harvey
(Republic of Ireland) Douglas Hogan	4–3	(England) Sean Hopkin
(England) Matthew Glasby	4–3	(England) Zafran Ali
(England) Terry Challenger	0–4	(England) Sydney Wilson
(England) Sanderson Lam	3–4	(Wales) Alex Taubman

==== Round 2 ====
Best of 7 frames

(England) Luke Garland	2–4	(Scotland) Rhys Clark
(Scotland) Mark Owens	w/o–w/d	(England) Charon Parker
(England) Andrew Milliard	4–3	(England) Henry Roper
(Scotland) Marc Davis	4–1	(Belgium) Hans Blanckaert
(England) Joe Steele	4–1	(Wales) Hannah Jones
(England) Dean Sheridan	4–3	(England) Charlie Walters
(England) Ashley Carty	0–4	(England) Daniel Ward
(England) Peter Devlin	0–4	(England) Ryan Causton
(England) Kurtis Weaver	4–1	(England) Mark Vincent
(England) Steven Hallworth	2–4	(England) Jeff Cundy
(England) Eric Pei	0–4	(England) Mitchell Travis
(Malta) Brian Cini	4–2	(Iceland) Sigurdur Kristjansson
(England) Shaun Wilkes	4–0	(Northern Ireland) Billy Brown
(England) Christopher Keogan	3–4	(Wales) Jimmy Carney
(England) George Marter	1–4	(England) Michael Georgiou
(England) Zak Surety	4–2	(Germany) Phil Barnes
(England) Robert Marshall	3–4	(England) Oliver Brown
(England) Adam Edge	0–4	(Wales) Kishan Hirani
(England) Martin Ball	4–1	(Northern Ireland) Jamie McArdle
(England) Andy Marriott	0–4	(England) Ian Glover
(England) Ben Harrison	4–3	(Belgium) Jurian Heusdens
(Scotland) Joseph McLaren	w/d–w/o	(England) James Silverwood
(Wales) Ben Jones	2–4	(England) Joe O'Connor
(England) Mitchell Mann	4–0	(Scotland) Barry Campbell

(Republic of Ireland) Leo Fernandez	4–0	(Malta) Joseph Casha
(England) Nico Elton	4–3	(Wales) Jack Bradford
(Wales) Jamie Clarke	1–4	(Wales) Gareth Allen
(England) Lee Brookes	0–4	(England) Michael Tomlinson
(England) Bash Maqsood	1–4	(India) David Singh
(Scotland) Christopher Giffney	2–4	(Wales) Thomas Davie
(Republic of Ireland) John Sutton	3–4	(Malta) Aaron Busuttil
(England) Lewis Frampton	4–2	(England) Luke Stilwell
(England) Darren Cook	4–2	(England) Richard Haney
(England) Adam Longley	0–4	(England) Brandon Sargeant
(Australia) Ryan Thomerson	4–0	(England) Adam Bobat
(England) Thomas Whealthy	1–4	(England) Matthew Day
(England) Joe Roberts	4–2	(England) Sam Harvey
(England) Jamie Bodle	4–2	(England) Saqib Nasir
(Italy) Michele Bataglia	0–4	(Scotland) Dylan Craig
(England) Tommy Doherty	0–4	(England) Reanne Evans
(England) Jamie Barrett	w/d–w/o	(England) Damian Wilks
(England) Oliver Lines	4–0	(Republic of Ireland) Douglas Hogan
(Wales) Andrew Rogers	1–4	(England) Zack Richardson
(England) Shane Castle	4–0	(England) Imran Nisar
(England) John Patrick Tyndall	4–1	(England) Michael Williams
(England) Ashley Hugill	3–4	(England) Matthew Glasby
(Scotland) Eden Sharav	4–2	(England) Sydney Wilson
(England) Williams Lemons	0–4	(Wales) Alex Taubman

==== Round 3 ====
Best of 7 frames

(Scotland) Rhys Clark	4–2	(Scotland) Mark Owens
(England) Andrew Milliard	3–4	(Scotland) Marc Davis
(England) Joe Steele	1–4	(England) Dean Sheridan
(England) Daniel Ward	4–0	(England) Ryan Causton
(England) Kurtis Weaver	2–4	(England) Jeff Cundy
(England) Mitchell Travis	4–2	(Malta) Brian Cini
(England) Shaun Wilkes	4–1	(Wales) Jimmy Carney
(England) Michael Georgiou	4–1	(England) Zak Surety
(England) Oliver Brown	4–2	(Wales) Kishan Hirani
(England) Martin Ball	1–4	(England) Ian Glover
(England) Ben Harrison	3–4	(England) James Silverwood
(England) Joe O'Connor	4–3	(England) Mitchell Mann

(Republic of Ireland) Leo Fernandez	4–0	(England) Nico Elton
(Wales) Gareth Allen	3–4	(England) Michael Tomlinson
(India) David Singh	4–3	(Wales) Thomas Davie
(Malta) Aaron Busuttil	4–2	(England) Lewis Frampton
(England) Darren Cook	4–1	(England) Brandon Sargeant
(Australia) Ryan Thomerson	1–4	(England) Matthew Day
(England) Joe Roberts	1–4	(England) Jamie Bodle
(Scotland) Dylan Craig	4–3	(England) Reanne Evans
(England) Damian Wilks	0–4	(England) Oliver Lines
(England) Zack Richardson	1–4	(England) Shane Castle
(England) John Patrick Tyndall	4–3	(England) Matthew Glasby
(Scotland) Eden Sharav	4–1	(Wales) Alex Taubman

==== Round 4 ====
Best of 7 frames

(Scotland) Rhys Clark	3–4	(Scotland) Marc Davis
(England) Dean Sheridan	4–1	(England) Daniel Ward
(England) Jeff Cundy	4–3	(England) Mitchell Travis
(England) Shaun Wilkes	0–4	(England) Michael Georgiou
(England) Oliver Brown	4–3	(England) Ian Glover
(England) James Silverwood	1–4	(England) Joe O'Connor

(Republic of Ireland) Leo Fernandez	4–3	(England) Michael Tomlinson
(India) David Singh	4–2	(Malta) Aaron Busuttil
(England) Darren Cook	4–3	(England) Matthew Day
(England) Jamie Bodle	4–0	(Scotland) Dylan Craig
(England) Oliver Lines	4–3	(England) Shane Castle
(England) John Patrick Tyndall	1–4	(Scotland) Eden Sharav

==== Round 5 ====
Best of 7 frames

(Scotland) Marc Davis	1–4	(England) Dean Sheridan
(England) Jeff Cundy	2–4	(England) Michael Georgiou
(England) Oliver Brown	2–4	(England) Joe O'Connor

(Republic of Ireland) Leo Fernandez	4–0	(India) David Singh
(England) Darren Cook	1–4	(England) Jamie Bodle
(England) Oliver Lines	4–1	(Scotland) Eden Sharav

=== Main rounds ===
==== Top half ====
===== Section 1 =====
Last 128; Best of 7 frames
(Wales) Mark Williams	4
(England) Craig Steadman	2
(England) Matthew Selt	2
(China) Yu Delu	4
(England) Robert Milkins	2
(China) Tian Pengfei	4
(England) Sam Baird	4
(Thailand) Ratchayothin Yotharuck	1
(India) Pankaj Advani	4
(England) Peter Ebdon	3
(England) Ian Burns	4
(England) Dean Sheridan	1
(England) Barry Hawkins	0
(England) Rory McLeod	4
(Scotland) Scott Donaldson	4
(Wales) Andrew Pagett	2

Last 64; Best of 7 frames
(Wales) Mark Williams	4
(China) Yu Delu	3
(China) Tian Pengfei	2
(England) Sam Baird	4
(India) Pankaj Advani	4
(England) Ian Burns	0
(England) Rory McLeod	4
(Scotland) Scott Donaldson	2

Last 32; Best of 7 frames
(Wales) Mark Williams	4
(England) Sam Baird	2
(India) Pankaj Advani	4
(England) Rory McLeod	0

Last 16; Best of 7 frames
(Wales) Mark Williams	4
(India) Pankaj Advani	0

===== Section 2 =====
Last 128; Best of 7 frames
(England) Kyren Wilson	4
(Wales) Michael White	2
(Germany) Patrick Einsle	1
(England) Steve Davis	4
(England) Robbie Williams	4
(England) Alex Davies	0
(Wales) Jamie Jones	4
(England) Michael Georgiou	1
(England) Gary Wilson	4
(Switzerland) Alexander Ursenbacher	0
(Scotland) Graeme Dott	3
(Hong Kong) Marco Fu	4
(England) Michael Holt	4
(Thailand) Thanawat Thirapongpaiboon	2
(England) Mark Davis	4
(Malta) Alex Borg	1

Last 64; Best of 7 frames
(England) Kyren Wilson	1
(England) Steve Davis	4
(England) Robbie Williams	0
(Wales) Jamie Jones	4
(England) Gary Wilson	2
(Hong Kong) Marco Fu	4
(England) Michael Holt	2
(England) Mark Davis	4

Last 32; Best of 7 frames
(England) Steve Davis	4
(Wales) Jamie Jones	3
(Hong Kong) Marco Fu	4
(England) Mark Davis	0

Last 16; Best of 7 frames
(England) Steve Davis	3
(Hong Kong) Marco Fu	4

===== Section 3 =====
Last 128; Best of 7 frames
(England) Joel Walker	0
(China) Li Hang	4
(England) Sean O'Sullivan	0
(Northern Ireland) Gerard Greene	4
(Scotland) Marcus Campbell	4
(England) Joe O'Connor	0
(England) Anthony Hamilton	4
(England) Simon Bedford	2
(England) Ben Woollaston	4
(Scotland) Fraser Patrick	1
(England) Judd Trump	3
(China) Ding Junhui	4
(Belgium) Luca Brecel	4
(England) Ryan Clark	1
(England) Hammad Miah	4
(China) Cao Yupeng	3

Last 64; Best of 7 frames
(China) Li Hang	4
(Northern Ireland) Gerard Greene	1
(Scotland) Marcus Campbell	1
(England) Anthony Hamilton	4
(England) Ben Woollaston	2
(China) Ding Junhui	4
(Belgium) Luca Brecel	4
(England) Hammad Miah	1

Last 32; Best of 7 frames
(China) Li Hang	3
(England) Anthony Hamilton	4
(China) Ding Junhui	4
(Belgium) Luca Brecel	1

Last 16; Best of 7 frames
(England) Anthony Hamilton	2
(China) Ding Junhui	4

===== Section 4 =====
Last 128; Best of 7 frames
(Norway) Kurt Maflin	4
(England) Mark King	1
(England) Michael Wasley	4
(Republic of Ireland) Leo Fernandez	1
(England) Stuart Bingham	4
(England) Jamie Bodle	2
(England) Jimmy Robertson	4
(China) Zhang Anda	3
(England) Alfie Burden	2
(England) Mark Joyce	4
(Scotland) Michael Leslie	3
(Republic of Ireland) David Morris	4
(England) Mark Selby	2
(Australia) Vinnie Calabrese	4
(England) Jamie O'Neill	2
(Thailand) Dechawat Poomjaeng	4

Last 64; Best of 7 frames
(Norway) Kurt Maflin	4
(England) Michael Wasley	1
(England) Stuart Bingham	3
(England) Jimmy Robertson	4
(England) Mark Joyce	2
(Republic of Ireland) David Morris	4
(Australia) Vinnie Calabrese	4
(Thailand) Dechawat Poomjaeng	2

Last 32; Best of 7 frames
(Norway) Kurt Maflin	1
(England) Jimmy Robertson	4
(Republic of Ireland) David Morris	1
(Australia) Vinnie Calabrese	4

Last 16; Best of 7 frames
(England) Jimmy Robertson	4
(Australia) Vinnie Calabrese	3

==== Bottom half ====
===== Section 5 =====
Last 128; Best of 7 frames
(Australia) Neil Robertson	3
(China) Liang Wenbo	4
(England) Mike Dunn	4
(Qatar) Ahmed Saif	1
(Scotland) Stephen Maguire	4
(England) Allan Taylor	2
(England) Jamie Cope	2
(China) Xiao Guodong	4
(England) David Grace	4
(Thailand) Noppon Saengkham	2
(Republic of Ireland) Ken Doherty	0
(England) Peter Lines	4
(Republic of Ireland) Fergal O'Brien	4
(China) Liu Chuang	1
(England) Ronnie O'Sullivan	4
(China) Lyu Haotian	3

Last 64; Best of 7 frames
(China) Liang Wenbo	4
(England) Mike Dunn	2
(Scotland) Stephen Maguire	4
(China) Xiao Guodong	1
(England) David Grace	2
(England) Peter Lines	4
(Republic of Ireland) Fergal O'Brien	1
(England) Ronnie O'Sullivan	4

Last 32; Best of 7 frames
(China) Liang Wenbo	2
(Scotland) Stephen Maguire	4
(England) Peter Lines	4
(England) Ronnie O'Sullivan	1

Last 16; Best of 7 frames
(Scotland) Stephen Maguire	4
(England) Peter Lines	1

===== Section 6 =====
Last 128; Best of 7 frames
(England) Chris Wakelin	2
(Scotland) Ross Muir	4
(England) Jack Lisowski	2
(Thailand) James Wattana	4
(England) Martin O'Donnell	2
(England) Jimmy White	4
(England) Shaun Murphy	4
(Wales) Jak Jones	2
(England) Tom Ford	4
(England) Andrew Higginson	1
(Wales) Daniel Wells	3
(China) Chen Zhe	4
(England) Andrew Norman	4
(England) Elliot Slessor	3
(Wales) Dominic Dale	4
(England) Chris Norbury	3

Last 64; Best of 7 frames
(Scotland) Ross Muir	3
(Thailand) James Wattana	4
(England) Jimmy White	1
(England) Shaun Murphy	4
(England) Tom Ford	4
(China) Chen Zhe	1
(England) Andrew Norman	1
(Wales) Dominic Dale	4

Last 32; Best of 7 frames
(Thailand) James Wattana	2
(England) Shaun Murphy	4
(England) Tom Ford	4
(Wales) Dominic Dale	2

Last 16; Best of 7 frames
(England) Shaun Murphy	4
(England) Tom Ford	1

===== Section 7 =====
Last 128; Best of 7 frames
(England) Martin Gould	4
(Finland) Robin Hull	1
(England) John Astley	4
(England) Lee Page	2
(England) David Gilbert	4
(China) Li Yan	1
(Scotland) Alan McManus	4
(Egypt) Mohamed Khairy	0
(England) Barry Pinches	2
(England) Ali Carter	4
(England) Ricky Walden	4
(Thailand) Passakorn Suwannawat	1
(Wales) Ryan Day	4
(England) Adam Duffy	2
(Scotland) Anthony McGill	4
(England) Dave Harold	3

Last 64; Best of 7 frames
(England) Martin Gould	4
(England) John Astley	2
(England) David Gilbert	4
(Scotland) Alan McManus	2
(England) Ali Carter	1
(England) Ricky Walden	4
(Wales) Ryan Day	4
(Scotland) Anthony McGill	2

Last 32; Best of 7 frames
(England) Martin Gould	0
(England) David Gilbert	4
(England) Ricky Walden	4
(Wales) Ryan Day	0

Last 16; Best of 7 frames
(England) David Gilbert	2
(England) Ricky Walden	4

===== Section 8 =====
Last 128; Best of 7 frames
(England) Joe Perry	0
(Northern Ireland) Mark Allen	4
(Malta) Tony Drago	4
(England) Oliver Lines	3
(Wales) Matthew Stevens	4
(England) Paul Davison	3
(Northern Ireland) Joe Swail	4
(England) Lee Spick	1
(England) Liam Highfield	4
(Thailand) Thepchaiya Un-Nooh	2
(England) Rod Lawler	4
(England) James Cahill	0
(England) Nigel Bond	3
(India) Aditya Mehta	4
(Scotland) John Higgins	4
(Scotland) Jamie Burnett	2

Last 64; Best of 7 frames
(Northern Ireland) Mark Allen	4
(Malta) Tony Drago	2
(Wales) Matthew Stevens	1
(Northern Ireland) Joe Swail	4
(England) Liam Highfield	2
(England) Rod Lawler	4
(India) Aditya Mehta	0
(Scotland) John Higgins	4

Last 32; Best of 7 frames
(Northern Ireland) Mark Allen	4
(Northern Ireland) Joe Swail	1
(England) Rod Lawler	4
(Scotland) John Higgins	2

Last 16; Best of 7 frames
(Northern Ireland) Mark Allen	4
(England) Rod Lawler	2

==== Finals ====
Quarter-finals; Best of 7 frames		Semi-finals; Best of 7 frames		Final; Best of 7 frames
(Wales) Mark Williams	0
(Hong Kong) Marco Fu	4	(Hong Kong) Marco Fu	4
(China) Ding Junhui	4	(China) Ding Junhui	3
(England) Jimmy Robertson	1			(Hong Kong) Marco Fu	3
(Scotland) Stephen Maguire	2			(England) Ricky Walden	4
(England) Shaun Murphy	4	(England) Shaun Murphy	1
(England) Ricky Walden	4	(England) Ricky Walden	4
(Northern Ireland) Mark Allen	3

== Century breaks ==
- 146, 124, 120, 107, 103 – Ding Junhui
- 138 – Ryan Day
- 137, 118 – Peter Lines
- 133, 129, 115, 111, 110 – Shaun Murphy
- 133 – Dechawat Poomjaeng
- 131, 129, 115, 106 – Ricky Walden
- 128 – Michael Georgiou
- 127, 102 – Rod Lawler
- 124 – David Gilbert
- 124 – Jamie Burnett
- 121, 107, 101 – Mark Allen
- 117 – Jeff Cundy
- 117 – James Silverwood
- 116, 101 – Ronnie O'Sullivan
- 115 – Jamie O'Neill
- 115 – Jimmy Robertson
- 113, 102 – Marco Fu
- 112 – Peter Ebdon
- 111 – Ben Woollaston
- 111 – Jamie Jones
- 108 – Judd Trump
- 107 – Leo Fernandez
- 106 – Oliver Brown
- 106 – Tian Pengfei
- 106 – Mike Dunn
- 106 – Jack Lisowski
- 105 – Marcus Campbell
- 105 – Anthony Hamilton
- 105 – Li Hang
- 105 – Jamie Cope
- 102 – Joe Roberts
- 101, 100 – Liang Wenbo
- 100 – Marc Davis
- 100 – David Morris
