= 2003 Euro-Asia Masters Challenge – Event 2 =

Euro-Asia Masters Challenge
Tournament information
- Dates: 28–31 August 2003
- Venue: Merchant Court Hotel
- City: Bangkok
- Country: Thailand
- Organisation: 110 Sport Management Group
- Format: Non-ranking event
- Winner's share: £30,000
- Highest break: Mark Williams (WAL) (112)

Final
- Champion: Ken Doherty (IRL)
- Runner-up: Marco Fu (HKG)
- Score: 5–2

The 2003 Euro-Asia Masters Challenge – Event 2 was an invitational professional non-ranking snooker held in Thailand in August 2003.

Following on from the first leg played immediately before it, this edition also featured the same format of eight players in two groups of four. Ken Doherty defeated Marco Fu 5–2 in the final to win the £30,000 prize.

== Results ==
=== Round-robin stage ===
Group A

POS	Player	MP	MW	FL	FL	FD
1	Ding Junhui (CHN)	3	2	4	2	+2
2	Marco Fu (HKG)	3	2	4	3	+1
3	Stephen Hendry (SCO)	3	1	3	4	−1
4	Mark Williams (WAL)	3	1	2	4	−2

Results:

- Mark Williams 2–0 Stephen Hendry
- Ding Junhui 2–0 Marco Fu
- Ding Junhui 2–0 Mark Williams
- Marco Fu 2–0 Mark Williams
- Stephen Hendry 2–0 Ding Junhui
- Marco Fu 2–1 Stephen Hendry

Group B

POS	Player	MP	MW	FL	FL	FD
1	Jimmy White (ENG)	3	2	5	3	+2
2	Ken Doherty (IRL)	3	2	4	3	+1
3	Shokat Ali (PAK)	3	1	3	4	−1
4	James Wattana (THA)	3	1	2	4	−2

Results:

- Jimmy White 2–0 James Wattana
- James Wattana 2–0 Shokat Ali
- Ken Doherty 2–0 James Wattana
- Shokat Ali 2–0 Ken Doherty
- Jimmy White 2–1 Shokat Ali
- Ken Doherty 2–1 Jimmy White

=== Knock-out stage ===
Semi-finals; Best of 9 frames
Marco Fu (HKG)	5
Jimmy White (ENG)	3
Ken Doherty (IRL)	5
Ding Junhui (CHN)	4

Final; Best of 9 frames
Marco Fu (HKG)	2
Ken Doherty (IRL)	5
