= 2020 Welsh Open (snooker) =

Snooker tournament

2020 ManBetX Welsh Open
Tournament information
- Dates: 10–16 February 2020
- Venue: Motorpoint Arena
- City: Cardiff
- Country: Wales
- Organisation: World Snooker Tour
- Format: Ranking event
- Total prize fund: £405,000
- Winner's share: £70,000
- Highest break: Kyren Wilson (ENG) (147)

Final
- Champion: Shaun Murphy (ENG)
- Runner-up: Kyren Wilson (ENG)
- Score: 9–1

The 2020 Welsh Open (officially the 2020 ManBetX Welsh Open) was a professional snooker tournament which took place from 10 to 16 February 2020 at the Motorpoint Arena in Cardiff, Wales. It was the 12th ranking event of the 2019–20 snooker season, and the final tournament of the season's Home Nations Series. It was the 29th edition of the Welsh Open, first held in 1992. The event featured a prize fund of £405,000 with the winner receiving £70,000.

Neil Robertson was the defending champion, having beaten Stuart Bingham 9–7 in the 2019 final, but he lost in the quarter-finals to Kyren Wilson. Shaun Murphy won the event, with a 9–1 win over Kyren Wilson in the final. There were a total of 77 century breaks at the event, the highest made by Wilson, a maximum break of 147 in the first frame of his first-round match with Jackson Page.

== Format ==
The Welsh Open began as a ranking tournament in 1992. The 2020 tournament took place at the Motorpoint Arena in Cardiff, Wales between 10 and 16 February, the 29th edition of the event. It was the twelfth World Snooker Tour ranking competition in the 2019–20 snooker season, following the World Grand Prix and preceding the Snooker Shoot Out. It was the fourth and final event of the Home Nations Series, and featured 128 participants from the World Snooker Tour.

The defending Welsh Open champion from 2019 was Neil Robertson who won the final with a 9–7 victory over Stuart Bingham. All matches were best-of-seven frames until the quarter-finals, which were the best-of-nine, the semi-finals the best-of-eleven. The final was played over two sessions, as the best-of-17 frames. The event was sponsored by sports betting company BetVictor, and broadcast locally by BBC Cymru Wales; Quest; Eurosport in Europe and Australia; CCTV, Superstars Online, Youku and Zhibo.tv in China; True sport in Thailand; Sky Sports in New Zealand and DAZN in Canada. A single qualifying match was played between two local amateur players – Darren Morgan and Gavin Lewis.

=== Prize fund ===
The event's total prize fund is £405,000, with the winner receiving £70,000. The breakdown of prize money for this year is shown below:

- Winner: £70,000
- Runner-up: £30,000
- Semi-final: £20,000
- Quarter-final: £10,000
- Last 16: £7,500
- Last 32: £4,000
- Last 64: £3,000
- Highest break: £5,000
- Total: £405,000

== Summary ==
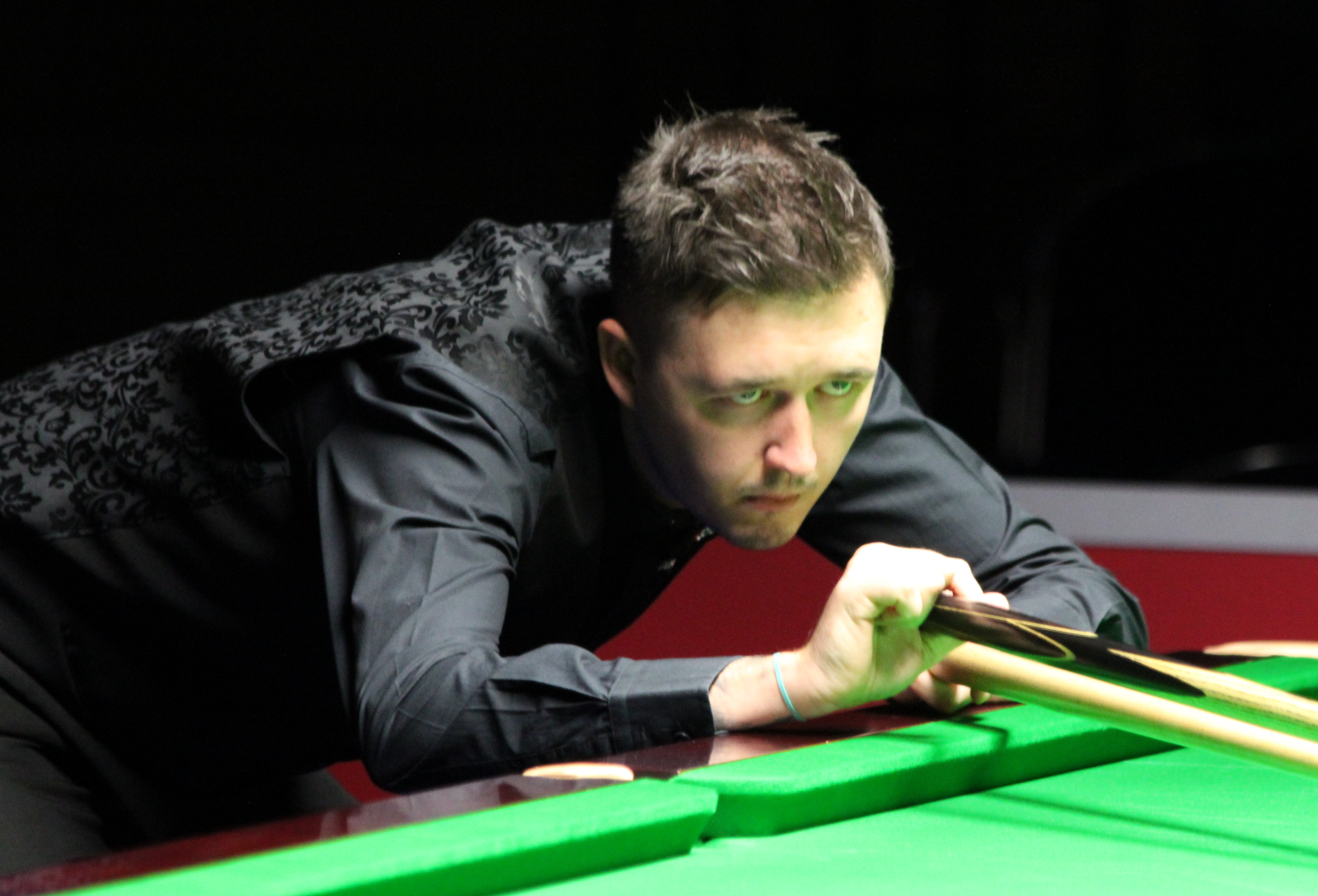
Kyren Wilson made a maximum break in his first round match, and reached the final of the event.

The opening round was played on 10 and 11 February. Local amateur Darren Morgan completed a 4–0 win over fellow Welsh amateur Gavin Lewis, but lost to Shaun Murphy 0–4 in the opening round. Ashley Carty defeated Joe Perry, 4–3 after a break of 66 in the deciding frame. Soheil Vahedi defeated 20th seed Thepchaiya Un-Nooh 4–2, whilst 12th seed David Gilbert was beaten by Matthew Stevens 2–4. Kyren Wilson defeated Jackson Page 4–3, and made a maximum break in the opening frame, the second of his career.

The next three rounds were played on 12 and 13 February. After defeating Jamie Clarke in the first round, defending champion Neil Robertson defeated Mark Joyce, Noppon Saengkham and completed a whitewash over Gerard Greene to reach the quarter-finals. Wilson defeated Liam Highfield, Martin O'Donnell and ninth seed Ding Junhui to play Robertson, which he won 5–0. Mark Selby defeated David Grace, Chen Zifan, Andy Lee and Zhao Xintong to play Ronnie O'Sullivan in the quarter-finals, with O'Sullivan winning 5–1.

Seeded 19, Yan Bingtao defeated Michael Holt, Mitchell Mann, Stuart Bingham and Anthony McGill to reach the quarter-finals, who had defeated Luca Brecel 4–3 in the last 16. Yan defeated Higgins 5–2, where Higgins described his performance as "pathetic". Murphy defeated Alfie Burden in the second round 4–3, before beating Ben Woollaston and Dominic Dale 4–1. He met Judd Trump, the world number one, who had defeated James Cahill, Billy Joe Castle, Igor Figueiredo and Stephen Maguire in the quarter-final and won 5–3. Wilson defeated O'Sullivan in the first semi-final on a deciding frame 6–5, whilst Murphy overcame Yan by the same scoreline.

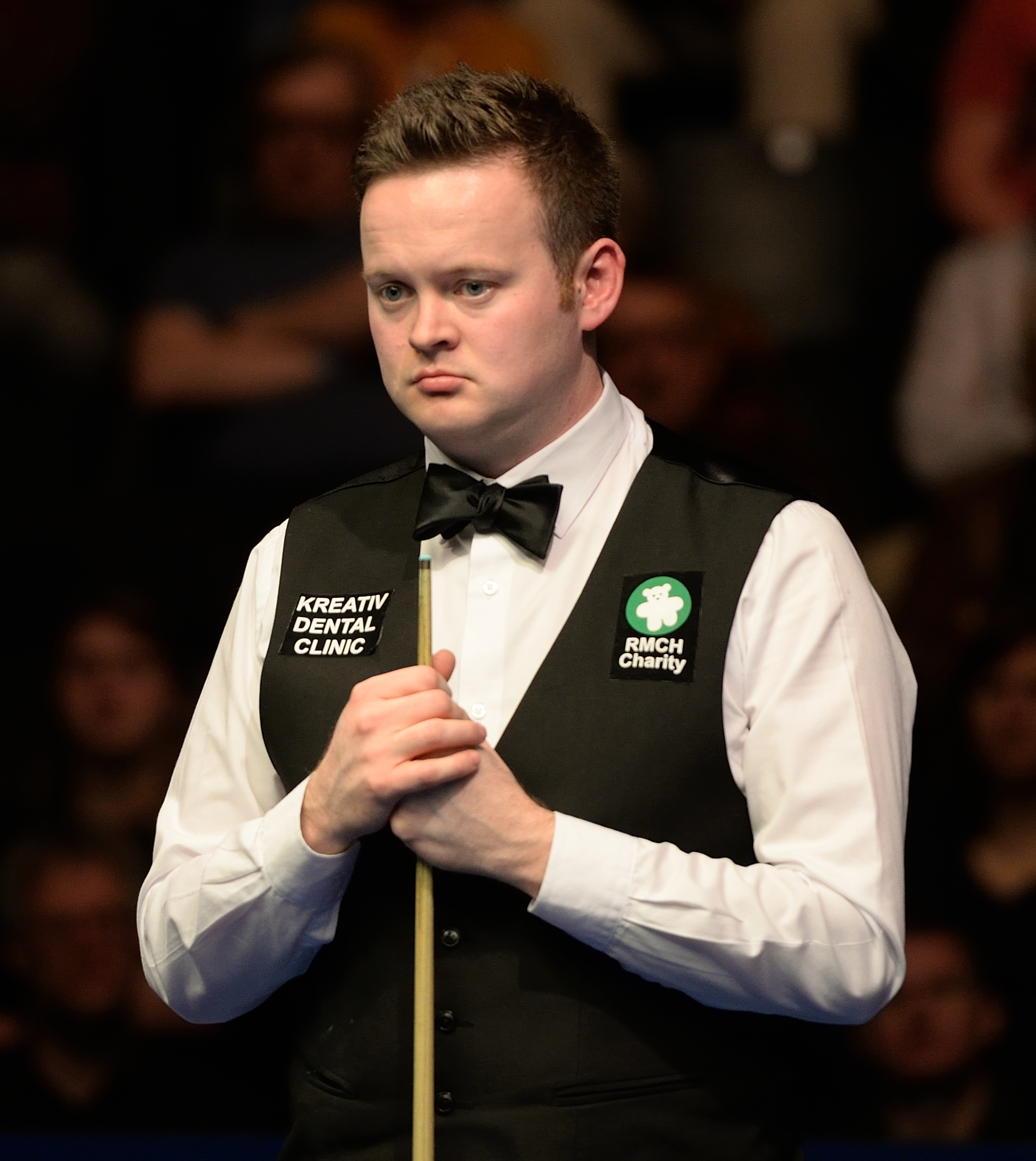
Shaun Murphy won the event, with a 9–1 win over Kyren Wilson.

The final was played between eighth seed Kyren Wilson and tenth seed Shaun Murphy on 16 February. The final was played over two sessions as a best-of-17 frames match. Murphy won the opening frame with a break of 108, and made a second century break, a 134, in frame eight as he won seven of the opening session frames to lead 7–1. Wilson won only frame seven during the opening session. On the resumption of the match, Murphy fluked a red ball to win frame nine and took frame ten with a third century break to finish a 9–1 victory. This was Murphy's second championship victory of the season, having also won the 2019 China Championship 9–8 over Mark Williams.

== Tournament draw ==
The results from the event is shown below. Players in bold denote match winners, whilst numbers in brackets are player's seedings.

=== Qualifying round ===
Darren Morgan (WAL) 4–0 Gavin Lewis (WAL)

=== Main draw ===
==== Section 1 ====
Last 128; Best of 7 frames
**Neil Robertson (AUS) (1)**	**4**
Jamie Clarke (WAL)	2
Fergal O'Brien (IRL)	3
**Mark Joyce (ENG)**	**4**
**Noppon Saengkham (THA) (32)**	**4**
Alan McManus (SCO)	3
Hammad Miah (ENG)	2
**Alexander Ursenbacher (SUI)**	**4**
**Ali Carter (ENG) (16)**	**4**
Adam Stefanow (POL)	2
**Gerard Greene (NIR)**	**4**
Liang Wenbo (CHN)	2
Joe Perry (ENG) (17)	3
**Ashley Carty (ENG)**	**4**
**Daniel Wells (WAL)**	**4**
Barry Pinches (ENG)	2

Last 64; Best of 7 frames
**(Australia) Neil Robertson (1)**	**4**
(England) Mark Joyce	2
**(Thailand) Noppon Saengkham (32)**	**4**
(Switzerland) Alexander Ursenbacher	1
(England) Ali Carter (16)	0
**(Northern Ireland) Gerard Greene**	**4**
(England) Ashley Carty	2
**(Wales) Daniel Wells**	**4**

Last 32; Best of 7 frames
**(Australia) Neil Robertson (1)**	**4**
(Thailand) Noppon Saengkham (32)	3
**(Northern Ireland) Gerard Greene**	**4**
(Wales) Daniel Wells	2

Last 16; Best of 7 frames
**(Australia) Neil Robertson (1)**	**4**
(Northern Ireland) Gerard Greene	0

==== Section 2 ====
Last 128; Best of 7 frames
**Yuan Sijun (CHN)**	**4**
Thor Chuan Leong (MAS)	0
**Jimmy Robertson (ENG) (24)**	**4**
Riley Parsons (ENG)	0
Nigel Bond (ENG)	0
**Ricky Walden (ENG)**	**4**
**Ding Junhui (CHN) (9)**	**4**
Marco Fu (HKG)	2
**Martin O'Donnell (ENG)**	**4**
Andy Hicks (ENG)	0
**Tom Ford (ENG) (25)**	**4**
Xu Si (CHN)	3
Zhang Anda (CHN)	3
**Liam Highfield (ENG)**	**4**
**Kyren Wilson (ENG) (8)**	**4**
Jackson Page (WAL)	3

Last 64; Best of 7 frames
(China) Yuan Sijun	2
**(England) Jimmy Robertson (24)**	**4**
(England) Ricky Walden	1
**(China) Ding Junhui (9)**	**4**
**(England) Martin O'Donnell**	**4**
(England) Tom Ford (25)	0
(England) Liam Highfield	2
**(England) Kyren Wilson (8)**	**4**

Last 32; Best of 7 frames
(England) Jimmy Robertson (24)	1
**(China) Ding Junhui (9)**	**4**
(England) Martin O'Donnell	0
**(England) Kyren Wilson (8)**	**4**

Last 16; Best of 7 frames
(China) Ding Junhui (9)	2
**(England) Kyren Wilson (8)**	**4**

==== Section 3 ====
Last 128; Best of 7 frames
**Mark Selby (ENG) (5)**	**4**
David Grace (ENG)	2
Kurt Maflin (NOR)	3
**Chen Zifan (CHN)**	**4**
Matthew Selt (ENG) (28)	2
**Andy Lee (HKG)**	**4**
**Robbie Williams (ENG)**	**4**
Chris Wakelin (ENG)	1
David Gilbert (ENG) (12)	2
**Matthew Stevens (WAL)**	**4**
**Brandon Sargeant** (ENG)	**w/o**
Peter Ebdon (ENG)	w/d
Graeme Dott (SCO) (21)	0
**Zhao Xintong (CHN)**	**4**
Lu Ning (CHN)	3
**Louis Heathcote (ENG)**	**4**

Last 64; Best of 7 frames
**(England) Mark Selby (5)**	**4**
(China) Chen Zifan	1
**(Hong Kong) Andy Lee**	**4**
(England) Robbie Williams	3
**(Wales) Matthew Stevens**	**4**
(England) Brandon Sargeant	0
**(China) Zhao Xintong**	**4**
(England) Louis Heathcote	2

Last 32; Best of 7 frames
**(England) Mark Selby (5)**	**4**
(Hong Kong) Andy Lee	2
(Wales) Matthew Stevens	1
**(China) Zhao Xintong**	**4**

Last 16; Best of 7 frames
**(England) Mark Selby (5)**	**4**
(China) Zhao Xintong	3

==== Section 4 ====
Last 128; Best of 7 frames
**Si Jiahui (CHN)**	**4**
Lei Peifan (CHN)	1
Thepchaiya Un-Nooh (THA) (20)	2
**Soheil Vahedi (IRN)**	**4**
Lee Walker (WAL)	2
**John Astley (ENG)**	**4**
**Jack Lisowski (ENG) (13)**	**4**
Li Hang (CHN)	2
**Anthony Hamilton (ENG)**	**4**
Michael White (WAL)	3
**Lyu Haotian (CHN) (29)**	**4**
Kishan Hirani (WAL)	0
**Stuart Carrington (ENG)**	**4**
Mike Dunn (ENG)	3
**Ronnie O'Sullivan (ENG) (4)**	**4**
Zhang Jiankang (CHN)	1

Last 64; Best of 7 frames
(China) Si Jiahui	2
**(Iran) Soheil Vahedi**	**4**
(England) John Astley	3
**(England) Jack Lisowski (13)**	**4**
**(England) Anthony Hamilton**	**4**
(China) Lyu Haotian (29)	3
(England) Stuart Carrington	2
**(England) Ronnie O'Sullivan (4)**	**4**

Last 32; Best of 7 frames
**(Iran) Soheil Vahedi**	**4**
(England) Jack Lisowski (13)	0
(England) Anthony Hamilton	2
**(England) Ronnie O'Sullivan (4)**	**4**

Last 16; Best of 7 frames
(Iran) Soheil Vahedi	0
**(England) Ronnie O'Sullivan (4)**	**4**

==== Section 5 ====
Last 128; Best of 7 frames
**Mark Williams (WAL) (3)**	**4**
Oliver Lines (ENG)	1
**Jordan Brown (NIR)**	**4**
Alex Borg (MLT)	1
**Anthony McGill (SCO) (30)**	**4**
Duane Jones (WAL)	1
**Mei Xiwen (CHN)**	**4**
Michael Georgiou (CYP)	2
**Stuart Bingham (ENG) (14)**	**4**
Martin Gould (ENG)	2
**Chen Feilong (CHN)**	**4**
Sam Baird (ENG)	3
**Yan Bingtao (CHN) (19)**	**4**
Michael Holt (ENG)	0
**Mitchell Mann (ENG)**	**4**
Bai Langning (CHN)	1

Last 64; Best of 7 frames
**(Wales) Mark Williams (3)**	**4**
(Northern Ireland) Jordan Brown	2
**(Scotland) Anthony McGill (30)**	**4**
(China) Mei Xiwen	1
**(England) Stuart Bingham (14)**	**4**
(China) Chen Feilong	1
**(China) Yan Bingtao (19)**	**4**
(England) Mitchell Mann	0

Last 32; Best of 7 frames
(Wales) Mark Williams (3)	1
**(Scotland) Anthony McGill (30)**	**4**
(England) Stuart Bingham (14)	3
**(China) Yan Bingtao (19)**	**4**

Last 16; Best of 7 frames
(Scotland) Anthony McGill (30)	3
**(China) Yan Bingtao (19)**	**4**

==== Section 6 ====
Last 128; Best of 7 frames
**Luca Brecel (BEL)**	**4**
Kacper Filipiak (POL)	1
**Scott Donaldson (SCO) (22)**	**4**
Sunny Akani (THA)	1
**Tian Pengfei (CHN)**	**4**
Jamie O'Neill (ENG)	2
**Barry Hawkins (ENG) (11)**	**4**
Sam Craigie (ENG)	2
Peter Lines (ENG)	1
**Fan Zhengyi (CHN)**	**4**
**Xiao Guodong (CHN) (27)**	**4**
Fraser Patrick (SCO)	1
Mark King (ENG)	1
**Ken Doherty (IRL)**	**4**
**John Higgins (SCO) (6)**	**4**
Joe O'Connor (ENG)	1

Last 64; Best of 7 frames
**(Belgium) Luca Brecel**	**4**
(Scotland) Scott Donaldson (22)	2
**(China) Tian Pengfei**	**4**
(England) Barry Hawkins (11)	0
(China) Fan Zhengyi	0
**(China) Xiao Guodong (27)**	**4**
(Republic of Ireland) Ken Doherty	1
**(Scotland) John Higgins (6)**	**4**

Last 32; Best of 7 frames
**(Belgium) Luca Brecel**	**4**
(China) Tian Pengfei	3
(China) Xiao Guodong (27)	2
**(Scotland) John Higgins (6)**	**4**

Last 16; Best of 7 frames
(Belgium) Luca Brecel	3
**(Scotland) John Higgins (6)**	**4**

==== Section 7 ====
Last 128; Best of 7 frames
**Mark Allen (NIR) (7)**	**4**
Andrew Higginson (ENG)	1
**James Wattana (THA)**	**4**
Jimmy White (ENG)	2
Ryan Day (WAL) (26)	1
**Simon Lichtenberg (GER)**	**4**
David Lilley (ENG)	0
**Dominic Dale (WAL)**	**4**
**Shaun Murphy (ENG) (10)**	**4**
Darren Morgan (WAL)	0
**Alfie Burden (ENG)**	**4**
Amine Amiri (MAR)	0
Zhou Yuelong (CHN) (23)	1
**Elliot Slessor (ENG)**	**4**
Eden Sharav (ISR)	1
**Ben Woollaston (ENG)**	**4**

Last 64; Best of 7 frames
**(Northern Ireland) Mark Allen (7)**	**4**
(Thailand) James Wattana	0
(Germany) Simon Lichtenberg	2
**(Wales) Dominic Dale**	**4**
**(England) Shaun Murphy (10)**	**4**
(England) Alfie Burden	3
(England) Elliot Slessor	2
**(England) Ben Woollaston**	**4**

Last 32; Best of 7 frames
(Northern Ireland) Mark Allen (7)	2
**(Wales) Dominic Dale**	**4**
**(England) Shaun Murphy (10)**	**4**
(England) Ben Woollaston	1

Last 16; Best of 7 frames
(Wales) Dominic Dale	1
**(England) Shaun Murphy (10)**	**4**

==== Section 8 ====
Last 128; Best of 7 frames
Jak Jones (WAL)	0
**Robert Milkins (ENG)**	**4**
**Gary Wilson (ENG) (18)**	**4**
Chang Bingyu (CHN)	1
**Ian Burns (ENG)**	**4**
Harvey Chandler (ENG)	1
**Stephen Maguire (SCO) (15)**	**4**
Rod Lawler (ENG)	2
Hossein Vafaei (IRN)	1
**Igor Figueiredo (BRA)**	**4**
**Mark Davis (ENG) (31)**	**4**
Luo Honghao (CHN)	1
Craig Steadman (ENG)	2
**Billy Joe Castle (ENG)**	**4**
**Judd Trump (ENG) (2)**	**4**
James Cahill (ENG)	1

Last 64; Best of 7 frames
**(England) Robert Milkins**	**4**
(England) Gary Wilson (18)	1
(England) Ian Burns	3
**(Scotland) Stephen Maguire (15)**	**4**
**(Brazil) Igor Figueiredo**	**4**
(England) Mark Davis (31)	3
(England) Billy Joe Castle	0
**(England) Judd Trump (2)**	**4**

Last 32; Best of 7 frames
(England) Robert Milkins	3
**(Scotland) Stephen Maguire (15)**	**4**
(Brazil) Igor Figueiredo	1
**(England) Judd Trump (2)**	**4**

Last 16; Best of 7 frames
(Scotland) Stephen Maguire (15)	1
**(England) Judd Trump (2)**	**4**

=== Finals ===
**Quarter-finals**; Best of 9 frames
(Australia) Neil Robertson (1)	0
**(England) Kyren Wilson (8)**	**5**
(England) Mark Selby (5)	1
**(England) Ronnie O'Sullivan (4)**	**5**
**(China) Yan Bingtao (19)**	**5**
(Scotland) John Higgins (6)	2
**(England) Shaun Murphy (10)**	**5**
(England) Judd Trump (2)	3

**Semi-finals**; Best of 11 frames
**(England) Kyren Wilson (8)**	**6**
(England) Ronnie O'Sullivan (4)	5
(China) Yan Bingtao (19)	5
**(England) Shaun Murphy (10)**	**6**

**Final**; Best of 17 frames
(England) Kyren Wilson (8)	1
**(England) Shaun Murphy (10)**	**9**

=== Final ===
Final: Best of 17 frames. Referee: Colin Humphries; Motorpoint Arena, Cardiff, Wales, 16 February 2020
Kyren Wilson (8); England	1–**9**	**Shaun Murphy** (10); England
Afternoon: 8–**108** (108), 4–**97**, 52–**68**, 45–**89**, 64–**66**, 0–**78**, **74**–31, 0–**134** (134); Evening: 0–**102** (102), 56–**73**
64	Highest break	**134**
0	Century breaks	**3**

== Century breaks ==
The event had a total of 77 century breaks made during the event, the highest being a maximum break of 147 by Kyren Wilson in the second frame of his first round match.

- 147, 136, 100 – Kyren Wilson
- 142, 131, 125, 118, 100 – Ronnie O'Sullivan
- 142, 100 – Zhao Xintong
- 141 – Lyu Haotian
- 140 – Igor Figueiredo
- 140 – Si Jiahui
- 139, 114, 111 – Matthew Stevens
- 138, 117 – Mark Selby
- 136, 128 – Stephen Maguire
- 135, 133, 121, 116 – Neil Robertson
- 135 – Luo Honghao
- 135 – Mitchell Mann
- 134, 116, 109, 108, 102, 101, 100 – Shaun Murphy
- 133 – Robert Milkins
- 132, 126, 121, 121, 101, 100, 100 – Judd Trump
- 132 – Ryan Day
- 130 – Liam Highfield
- 129 – David Grace
- 128, 117 – Luca Brecel
- 127, 122 – Barry Hawkins
- 127 – Ricky Walden
- 126, 106 – Chen Feilong
- 125, 108, 100 – Yan Bingtao
- 123 – Dominic Dale
- 120, 114 – Anthony McGill
- 117 – Robbie Williams
- 116, 110 – Ding Junhui
- 116, 107, 104, 100 – John Higgins
- 116 – Liang Wenbo
- 114, 101 – Mark Allen
- 110, 100 – Stuart Bingham
- 109 – Jimmy Robertson
- 108 – Jack Lisowski
- 108 – Tian Pengfei
- 105 – Stuart Carrington
- 104 – Andy Lee
- 101 – Xiao Guodong
- 100 – Gerard Greene
- 100 – Elliot Slessor
