= 2003 Euro-Asia Masters Challenge – Event 1 =

Euro-Asia Masters Challenge
Tournament information
- Dates: 21–24 August 2003
- Venue: HKCEC
- City: Wan Chai
- Country: Hong Kong
- Organisation: 110 Sport Management Group
- Format: Non-ranking event
- Winner's share: £30,000
- Highest break: James Wattana (THA) (131)

Final
- Champion: James Wattana (THA)
- Runner-up: Ken Doherty (IRL)
- Score: 6–4

The 2003 Euro-Asia Masters Challenge – Event 1 was an invitational professional non-ranking snooker tournament held in Hong Kong in August 2003.

Featuring eight players in two groups of four, James Wattana defeated Ken Doherty 6–4 in the final to win the £30,000 prize. It was Wattana's first notable title win since the 1995 Thailand Open. His break of 131 against Stephen Hendry in the semi-finals was the highest of the tournament.

== Results ==
=== Round-robin stage ===
Group A

POS	Player	MP	MW	FW	FL	FD	PTS
1	James Wattana (THA)	3	3	6	2	+4	6
2	Mark Williams (WAL)	3	1	3	4	-1	3*
3	Jimmy White (ENG)	3	1	3	4	-1	3
4	Ding Junhui (CHN)	3	1	2	4	−2	2

*Mark Williams finished in the playoffs ahead of Jimmy White due to winning their head to head match 2–0

Results:

- Ding Junhui 2–0 Mark Williams
- James Wattana 2–0 Ding Junhui
- Jimmy White 2–0 Ding Junhui
- Mark Williams 2–0 Jimmy White
- James Wattana 2–1 Mark Williams
- James Wattana 2–1 Jimmy White

Group B

POS	Player	MP	MW	FW	FL	FD	PTS
1	Ken Doherty (IRL)	3	3	6	0	+6	6
2	Stephen Hendry (SCO)	3	2	4	2	+2	4
3	Shokat Ali (PAK)	3	1	2	4	−2	2
4	Marco Fu (HKG)	3	0	0	6	−6	0

Results:

- Ken Doherty 2–0 Stephen Hendry
- Ken Doherty 2–0 Shokat Ali
- Ken Doherty 2–0 Marco Fu
- Shokat Ali 2–0 Marco Fu
- Stephen Hendry 2–0 Marco Fu
- Stephen Hendry 2–0 Shokat Ali

=== Knock-out stage ===
Semi-finals; Best of 9 frames
James Wattana (THA)	5
Stephen Hendry (SCO)	1
Ken Doherty (IRL)	5
Mark Williams (WAL)	1

Final; Best of 11 frames
James Wattana (THA)	6
Ken Doherty (IRL)	4
