= 2025 Riyadh Season Snooker Championship =

Tournament information
- Dates: 19–21 November 2025
- Venue: Global Theatre
- City: Boulevard City, Riyadh
- Country: Saudi Arabia
- Organisation: World Snooker Tour
- Format: Non-ranking event
- Total prize fund: £785,000
- Winner's share: £250,000
- Highest break: Zhao Xintong (CHN) (138)

Final
- Champion: Zhao Xintong (CHN)
- Runner-up: Neil Robertson (AUS)
- Score: 5–2

The 2025 Riyadh Season Snooker Championship was a professional non-ranking snooker tournament that took place from 19 to 21 November 2025 at the Global Theatre in Boulevard City, Riyadh, Saudi Arabia. Organised by the World Snooker Tour as part of the 2025‍–‍26 snooker season, the event featured twelve participants, comprising the defending champion, the reigning World Champion, the eight other highest-ranked players in the snooker world rankings as they stood after the 2025 Xi'an Grand Prix, and two local wildcard players.

The third edition of the tournament since it was first staged as the 2024 World Masters of Snooker, it took place during the Riyadh Season festival. It was broadcast by TNT Sports in the UK and Ireland, by Eurosport in mainland Europe, by local broadcasters in Asia, and by WST Play in all other territories. The winner received £250,000 from a total prize fund of £785,000. Additionally, the tournament featured a 20-point gold ball that could be potted only after a player had completed a maximum break to extend the break to 167. Any player who successfully potted the gold ball would win $1,000,000.

Mark Allen was the defending champion, having defeated Luca Brecel 5‍–‍1 in the final of the tournament's previous edition, but he lost 1–4 to Neil Robertson in the semi-finals. The reigning World Champion Zhao Xintong defeated Robertson 5–2 in the final to win his fourth professional title. The tournament produced 13 century breaks, of which the highest was a 138 by Zhao in his semi-final match against Judd Trump. No player compiled a maximum break at the event; the best effort was nine reds and nine blacks by Allen in the semi-finals. As such, no player had the opportunity to pot the gold ball for a 167 break.

== Overview ==
The tournament was first staged in March 2024 as the 2024 World Masters of Snooker, which was the first professional snooker event ever held in Saudi Arabia. The inaugural champion was Ronnie O'Sullivan, who defeated Luca Brecel 5–2 in the final.

The 2025 edition of the event—the third in the tournament's history—took place from 19 to 21 November in the Boulevard City entertainment district in Riyadh, Saudi Arabia. Mark Allen was the defending champion, having defeated Brecel 5‍–‍1 in the final of the tournament's previous edition.

=== Format ===
Colour	Value
Red	1 point
Yellow	2 points
Green	3 points
Brown	4 points
Blue	5 points
Pink	6 points
Black	7 points
Riyadh Season ball	20 points

All matches were played as the best of seven frames except the final, which was played as the best of nine frames. The matches were played under regular snooker rules, but the event used a gold ball worth 20 points, called the "Riyadh Season ball". The gold ball was placed on the centre of the baulk cushion, in line with the brown, blue, pink, and black balls. It could only be potted after a player had completed a maximum break of 147, to extend the break to 167. Fouling the gold ball awarded 4 penalty points to the opponent. The gold ball stayed on the table as long as it was possible for either player to complete a maximum break. When a maximum was no longer possible, the gold ball was removed from the table until the next frame.

=== Participants ===
The event featured twelve players, comprising the defending champion Mark Allen (seeded first), the reigning World Champion Zhao Xintong (seeded second), the eight other highest-ranked players in the snooker world rankings as they stood after the 2025 Xi'an Grand Prix, and two local wildcard players, 15-year-old Ziyad Alqabbani and 22-year-old Ayman Alamri, both from Saudi Arabia.

=== Broadcasters ===
The tournament was broadcast by TNT Sports and Discovery+ in the United Kingdom and Ireland; by Eurosport and locally relevant streaming platforms in mainland Europe (Discovery+ in Germany, Italy and Austria and HBO Max in all other markets); by the CBSA‑WPBSA Academy WeChat Channel, the CBSA‑WPBSA Academy Douyin and Huya Live in China; by Now TV in Hong Kong; by Astro SuperSport in Malaysia; by True Sports in Thailand; by TAP in the Philippines; and by Sportcast in Taiwan. In territories with no other broadcaster, the tournament was streamed via WST Play.

=== Prize money ===
The event featured a total prize pool of £785,000. An additional prize of $1,000,000 was available to any player who compiled a 167 break. In previous editions of the event, this prize was available only to the first player achieving the break.

- Winner: £250,000
- Runner-up: £125,000
- Semi-finals: £75,000
- Quarter-finals: £50,000
- Round 2: £25,000
- Round 1: £5,000
- 167 break: $1,000,000
- Total: £785,000

== Summary ==
=== Round one ===
The first round featured the ninth and tenth seeds against the two wildcard players. Shaun Murphy made breaks including 128 and 109 as he whitewashed Ziyad Alqabbani. Ding Junhui made a highest break of 84 as he whitewashed Ayman Alamri.

=== Round two ===
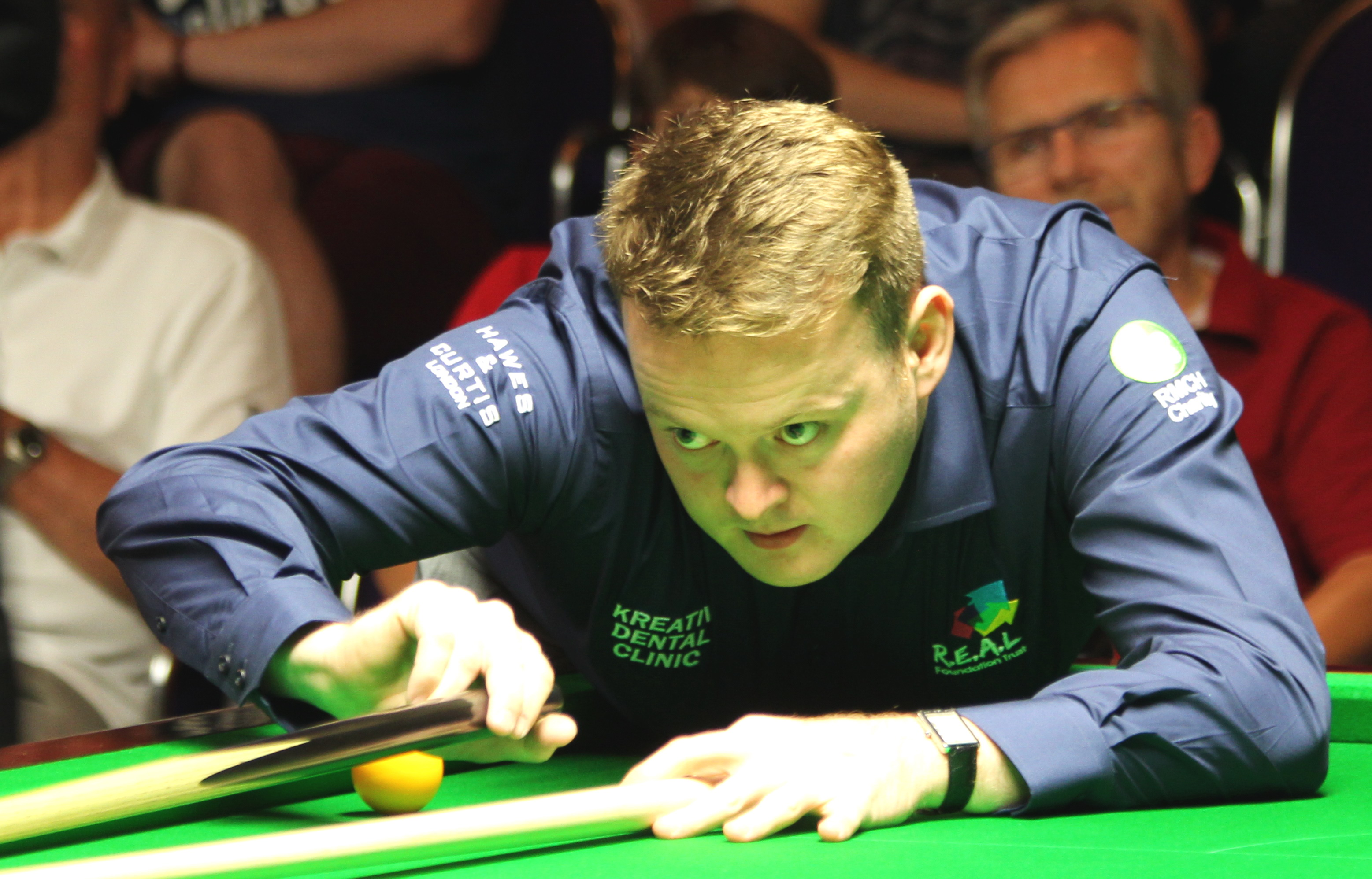
Shaun Murphy (pictured in 2015) whitewashed Ronnie O'Sullivan. It was Murphy's first victory over O'Sullivan since 2017.

Round two featured the winners from round one against the seventh and eighth seeds. Facing Ronnie O'Sullivan, Murphy won the opening frame, helped by a break of 53. He won the second frame after a safety battle on the last red, and extended his lead to 3–0 with a 93 break in frame three. Murphy completed a whitewash after O'Sullivan missed a yellow in frame four. It was Murphy's first victory over O'Sullivan since 2017, following six consecutive defeats, and the first time since 2023 that O'Sullivan had failed to win a frame in a match of seven frames or more. "I'm delighted," Murphy said afterwards. "Any win over [O'Sullivan] has to be celebrated. I have been playing well all season and it has been fantastic to carry my form through." John Higgins also whitewashed Ding, making two consecutive century breaks of 106 in frames three and four. Afterwards, Higgins criticised the playing conditions, noting that beermats had been placed beneath the table to raise it up. "Somebody really needs to get told," said Higgins afterwards. "I don't know who has passed that but it's pathetic for a million-pound tournament. It really is bad." Stephen Hendry, commenting for TNT Sports, said: "I can only assume the floor is so uneven they have had to build the table up, but as a player you can really feel the difference."

=== Quarter-finals ===
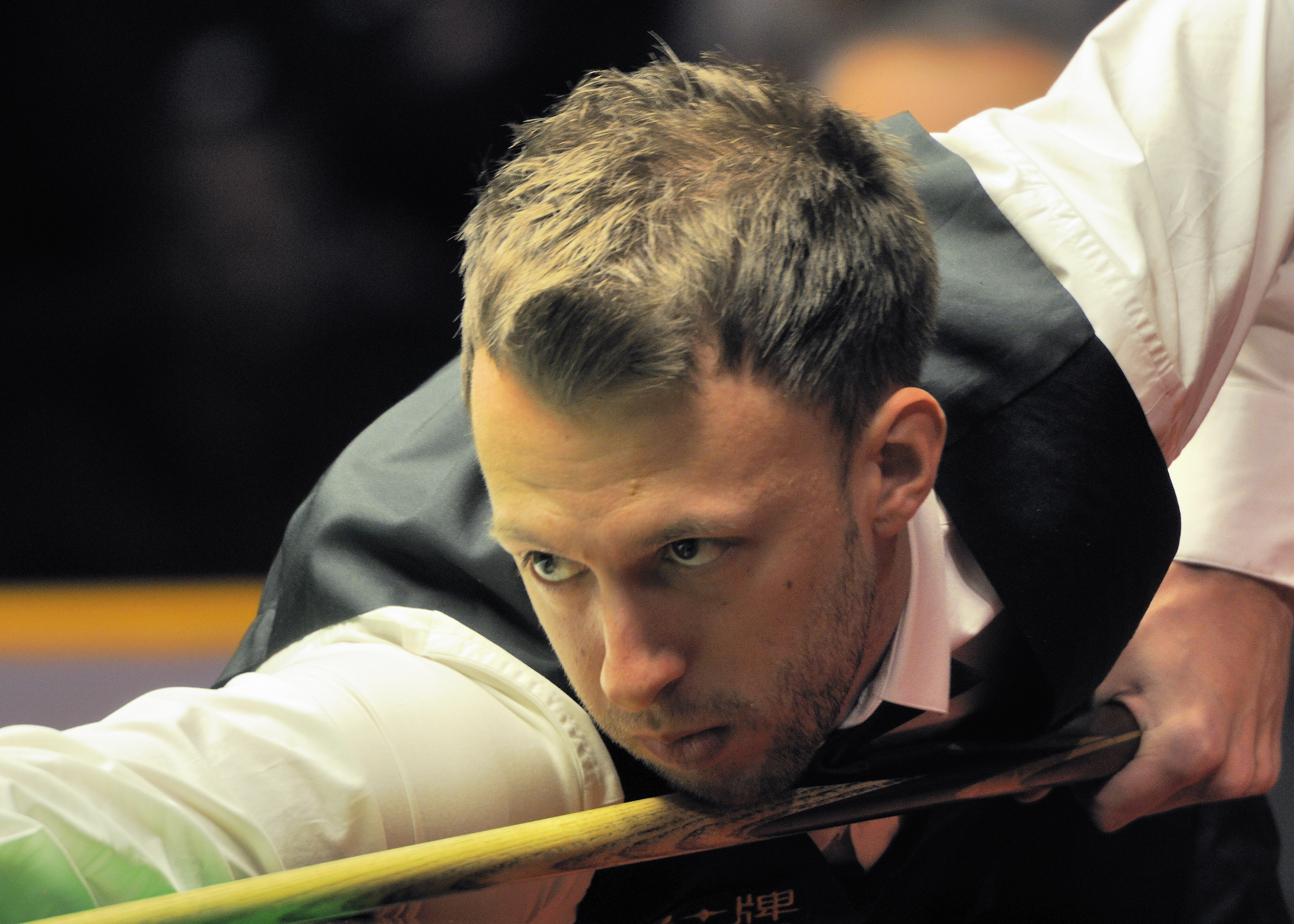
Judd Trump (pictured in 2014) ended his "experiment" with a titanium-ferrule cue. Playing with his old brass-ferrule cue, he whitewashed Mark Williams in 48 minutes.

The quarter-finals featured the top six seeds, who entered the competition at that point, together with the winners from round two. Neil Robertson, competing in the tournament for the first time, faced Kyren Wilson. Robertson made back-to-back centuries of 100 and 133 to win the first two frames. In frame three, he attempted a maximum break, potting five reds and five blacks before running out of position after the sixth red. He potted the blue instead of the black and went on to make a frame-winning break of 88. In frame four, Robertson produced a 76 break to complete a whitewash victory. "It was pretty much perfect, every time I got a chance I won the frame," said Robertson afterwards. Commenting on frame three, he said: "I would have loved to see how far I could have got with the 167—if the cue ball had run on another couple of inches it would have been perfect." Higgins and the defending champion Mark Allen shared the first two frames of their quarter-final. Allen attempted a maximum break in the third frame, but his effort ended on 48, and Higgins won the frame with an 82 clearance. Allen won frame four after a safety battle on the last red to tie the scores at 2–2. He also took frame five with a 49 break, his highest of the match, and then won frame six to complete a 4–2 victory.

Judd Trump, who had switched to a cue with a titanium ferrule at the beginning of the season, reverted to his old brass-ferrule cue for his match against Mark Williams. After taking a 2–0 lead, Trump made back-to-back centuries of 100 and 102 as he completed a whitewash victory, the match having lasted just 48 minutes. "The experiment with that cue did not succeed," Trump said afterwards. "It is hard to play your best when you are trying to find the right cue, but I'm out there battling. There is still going to be a bit of changing until I find the right cue, it is not perfect at the moment." Facing the reigning World Champion Zhao Xintong, Murphy trailed by 49 points in the opening frame but won it with a clearance of 79. Zhao tied the scores at 1–1 with a 62 break. Murphy led by 58 points in frame three, but he missed a red, and Zhao took the frame with a 69 break. A century of 101 gave Murphy frame four, tying the scores at 2–2, but Zhao took frame five with a 73 break. In frame six, Murphy was on a break of 40 when he missed a plant, and Zhao secured a 4–2 victory with a break of 88.

=== Semi-finals ===
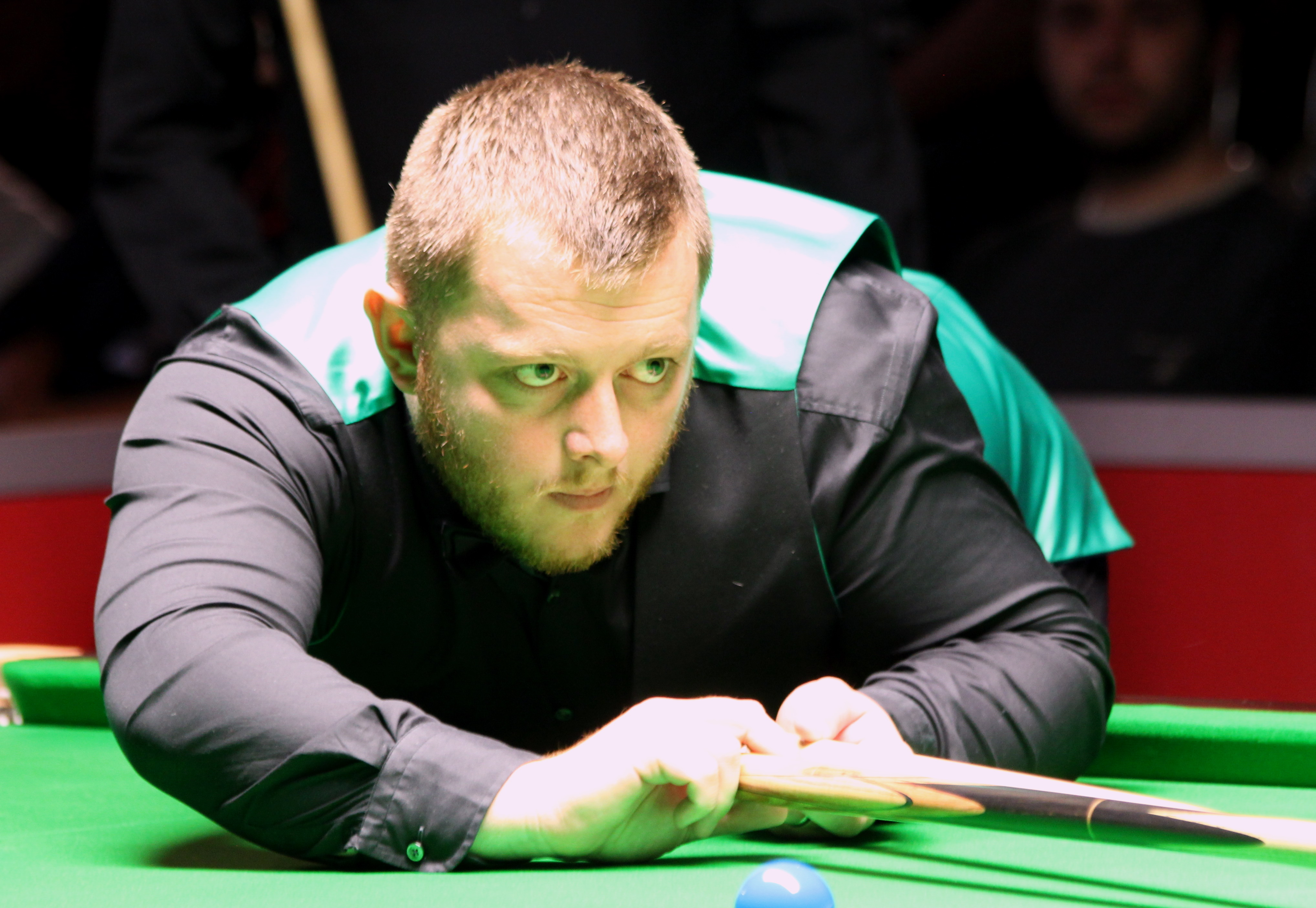
The defending champion Mark Allen (pictured in 2016) lost in the semi-finals but came closest to a maximum break at the event, potting nine reds and nine blacks.

In the first semi-final, the defending champion Allen faced Robertson, who made breaks including 73 and 67 as he won the first three frames. Allen came from 32 points behind to take frame four with a 91 clearance. In frame five, Allen attempted a maximum break, potting nine reds and nine blacks before he missed a red with the rest, ending the break on 72. Robertson then produced a clearance of 73 to win the frame by one point and secure a 4–1 victory.

In the other semi-final, Trump made breaks of 80 and 56 as he won the first two frames against Zhao. In frame three, Trump led by 34 points when he missed a long pot on a red. Zhao made a 66 break to win the frame, and then produced a century of 138 in frame four, the highest break of the tournament, to tie the scores at 2–2. Trump countered with a century of 103 to lead 3–2, but he missed opportunities to clinch the match in frame six, which Zhao eventually won on the colours, forcing the only deciding frame of the tournament. With two reds remaining in the decider, Zhao snookered Trump behind the yellow; from the opportunity that followed, Zhao potted a red into a middle pocket and went on to win the frame and match.

=== Final ===
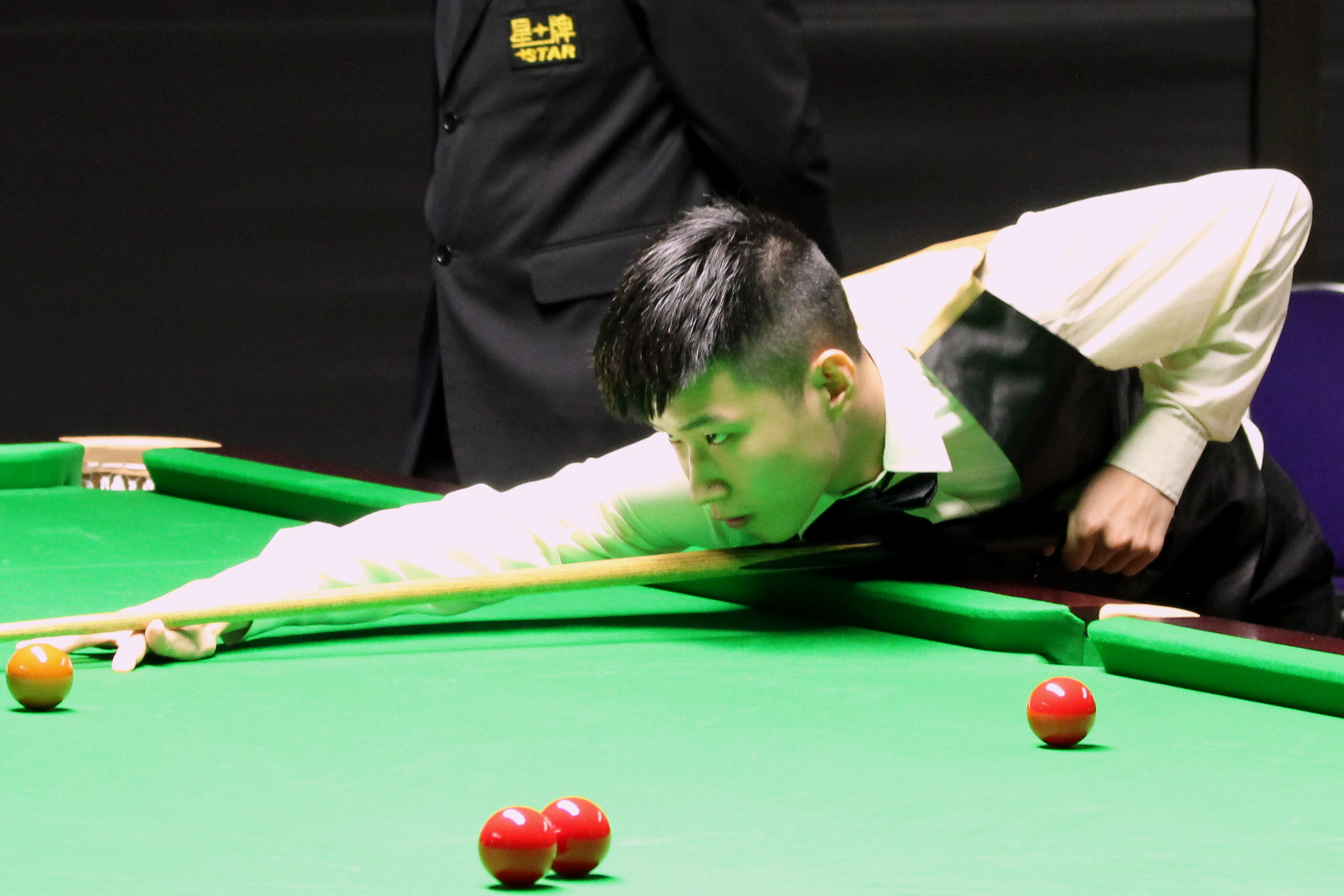
Zhao Xintong (pictured in 2016) defeated Neil Robertson in the final to win his fourth professional title.

The final was played as the best of nine frames between the world number three Robertson and the world number ten Zhao. The opening frame went to Zhao, who also had an opportunity to win the second from 46 points behind; however, he missed a pot on the black, and Robertson tied the scores at 1–1. In the third frame, Robertson attempted a maximum break, potting six reds and six blacks before losing position; Zhao recovered to win the frame on the colours and then made back-to-back centuries of 131 and 134 to move 4–1 ahead. Robertson won frame six with a 91 break and took a 20-point lead in frame seven before he missed a red to a middle pocket, allowing Zhao to secure a 5–2 victory with a 57 break. It was Zhao's first professional title since winning the 2025 World Championship and his fourth victory in his four professional finals. "I feel so happy, it's amazing to win this title," said Zhao afterwards. "I was nervous but I just tried to concentrate on the table. It's my first time in Riyadh so I will have a lot of good memories here and I look forward to coming back. Lots of people from China were here, they gave me huge support and that was so important to me."

== Tournament draw ==
Numbers in parentheses after the players' names denote the players' seedings, an (a) indicates amateur players not on the World Snooker Tour, and players in bold denote match winners. All matches are played as the best of seven frames except the final, which is played as the best of nine frames.

**Round 1** Best of 7 frames
**Ding Junhui (CHN) (9)**	**4**
Ayman Alamri (KSA) (a)	0
**Shaun Murphy (ENG) (10)**	**4**
Ziyad Alqabbani (KSA) (a)	0

**Round 2** Best of 7 frames
**John Higgins (SCO) (8)**	**4**
Ding Junhui (CHN) (9)	0
Ronnie O'Sullivan (ENG) (7)	0
**Shaun Murphy (ENG) (10)**	**4**

**Quarter-finals**; Best of 7 frames
**Mark Allen (NIR) (1)**	**4**
John Higgins (SCO) (8)	2
Kyren Wilson (ENG) (4)	0
**Neil Robertson (AUS) (5)**	**4**
**Judd Trump (ENG) (3)**	**4**
Mark Williams (WAL) (6)	0
**Zhao Xintong (CHN) (2)**	**4**
Shaun Murphy (ENG) (10)	2

**Semi-finals**; Best of 7 frames
Mark Allen (NIR) (1)	1
**Neil Robertson (AUS) (5)**	**4**
Judd Trump (ENG) (3)	3
**Zhao Xintong (CHN) (2)**	**4**

**Final**; Best of 9 frames
Neil Robertson (AUS) (5)	2
**Zhao Xintong (CHN) (2)**	**5**

=== Final ===
Final
Final: Best of 9 frames. Referee: Anastasiya Tuzikova; Global Theatre, Boulevard City, Riyadh, Saudi Arabia, 21 November 2025
Neil Robertson (5); Australia	2–**5**	**Zhao Xintong** (2); China
Frame scores: 13–**68**, **73**–33, 52–**81**, 1–**131** (131), 0–**134** (134), **91**–0, 37–**74**
(frame 6) 91	Highest break	**134** (frame 5)
0	Century breaks	**2**

== Century breaks ==
A total of 13 century breaks were made during the tournament.

- 138, 134, 131 – Zhao Xintong
- 133, 100 – Neil Robertson
- 128, 109, 101 – Shaun Murphy
- 106, 106 – John Higgins
- 103, 102, 100 – Judd Trump
