= Zhao Xintong =

Chinese snooker player (born 1997)

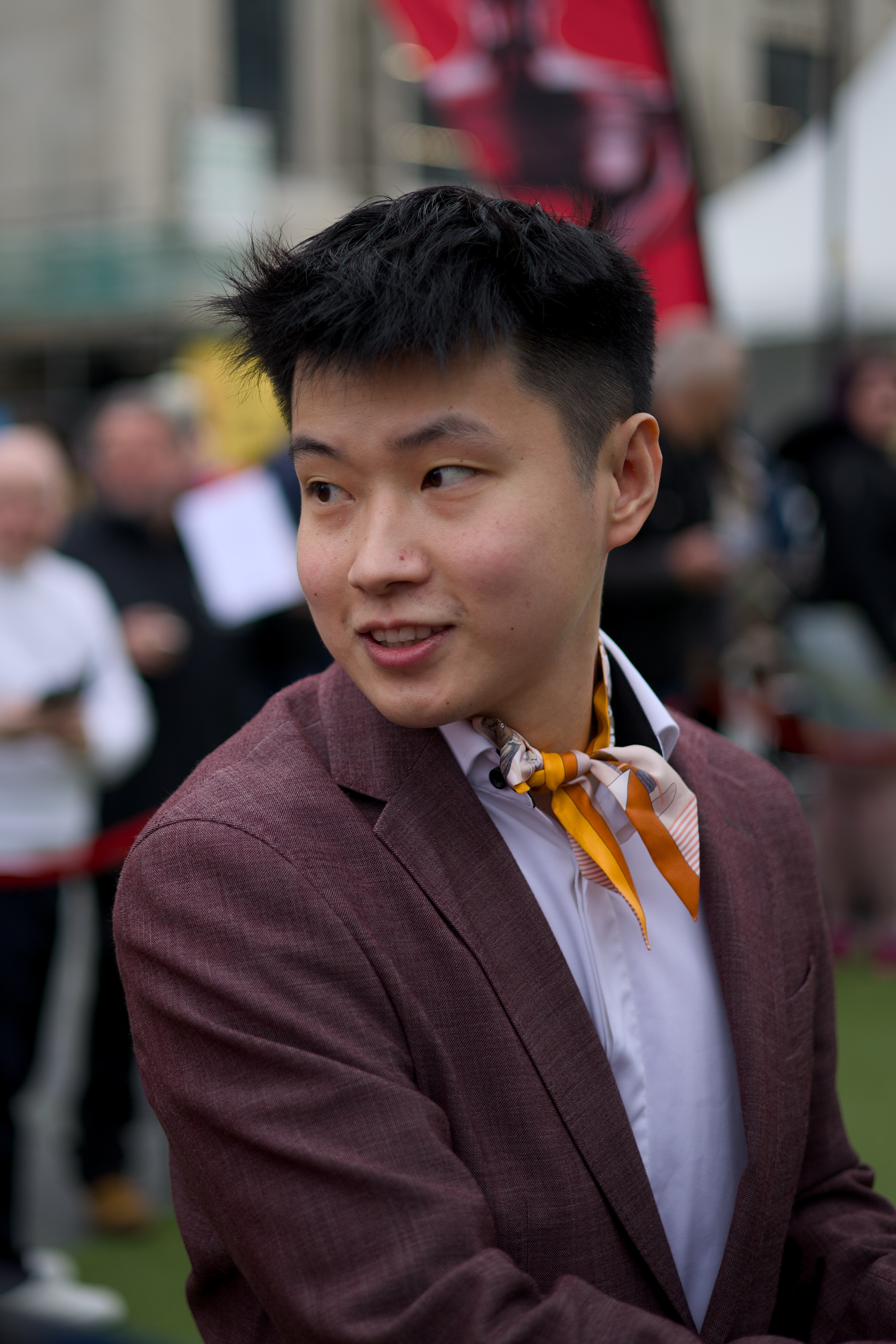
- Zhao in 2026

Personal information
- Nickname: The Cyclone
- Born: 3 April 1997 (age 29) Bao'an, Shenzhen, China

Sport
- Country: China
- Sport: Snooker
- Professional: 2016–2023, 2025–present
- Highest ranking: 1 (Aug 2026)
- Current ranking: 1 (as of 7 November 2026)
- Maximum breaks: 1
- Century breaks: 270 (as of 11 November 2026)

Tournament wins
- Ranking: 6
- World Championship: 2025
Medal record
Men's snooker
Representing China
Asian Indoor and Martial Arts Games
Gold medal – first place	2017 Ashgabat	Singles
Bronze medal – third place	2017 Ashgabat	Team

Zhao Xintong
- Simplified Chinese: 赵心童
- Traditional Chinese: 趙心童
Transcriptions
Standard Mandarin
- Hanyu Pinyin: Zhào Xīntóng
- Wade–Giles: Chao^{4} Hsin^{1}-t'ung^{2}
- IPA: [ʈʂâʊ ɕín.tʰʊ̌ŋ]
Yue: Cantonese
- Yale Romanization: Jiuh Sām Tùhng
- Jyutping: Ziu⁶ Sam¹ Tung⁴
- IPA: [tsiw˨ sɐm˥ tʰʊŋ˩]

Zhao Xintong (Chinese: 赵心童, Pinyin: Zhào Xīntóng, approximately chow shin-TUNG; born 3 April 1997) is a Chinese professional snooker player who is the current world number one. He won the 2025 World Snooker Championship, becoming the sport's first world champion from Asia. He has won a total of six ranking titles.

Zhao first turned professional in the 2016–17 season, aged 19. He won his first ranking title and first Triple Crown title at the 2021 UK Championship and also won the 2022 German Masters. In January 2023, Zhao was among a group of Chinese players suspended by the WPBSA and charged with match-fixing offences. Following an independent disciplinary tribunal, he was banned from competitive snooker for 20 months, as a result of which he lost his professional status. After his ban expired, Zhao competed on the amateur Q Tour, winning four consecutive events and finishing top of the 2024–25 Q Tour Europe rankings. Still competing as an amateur, he won four qualifying matches to reach the main stage of the 2025 World Championship. He defeated Ronnie O'Sullivan 17–7 in the semi-finals and Mark Williams 18–12 in the final, becoming the fourth qualifier to win the world title and the first player to win a ranking title while competing as an amateur.

Zhao rejoined the professional tour for the 2025–26 season. He won the non-ranking 2025 Riyadh Season Snooker Championship and further ranking titles at the 2026 World Grand Prix, the 2026 Players Championship, and the 2026 Tour Championship, making him the first player to win all three Players Series tournaments in the same season. He also became the third player to win over £1 million in a single season. Following the 2026 Wuhan Open, Zhao replaced Judd Trump as world number one, becoming the 13th player to achieve the sport's highest ranking.

== Early life ==
Born on 3 April 1997, Zhao was raised in the Songgang subdistrict of Bao'an, Shenzhen, Guangdong. His father, Zhao Xiaowei, who transferred from Xi'an to Songgang in 1995, is a finger reconstruction surgeon and the vice president of Songgang People's Hospital as of the 2010s. Zhao's mother Wen Anxiao is a Songgang local and the head nurse of the same hospital as of the 2010s.

Zhao's early exposure to snooker was shaped by Shenzhen, which is known for having a well-established snooker culture, as the sport spread across the British Hong Kong–Shenzhen border in the 1980s. Zhao began playing at age eight on snooker tables set up outside stores near his house. As he was not tall enough for the snooker table, he made up his height by wearing roller skates when practising at a snooker training club in Luohu, Shenzhen, partly to "look cool". He could move around the table quickly on the skates and developed the habit of quick firing. His parents set up a snooker table in their house when Zhao was ten years old.

After graduating from Songgang No.1 Elementary School, he dropped out of Songgang Middle School in 2009 to train full time. It was rare in China for the family's only child to have parental support for quitting middle school. In 2013, he trained at the newly established WPBSA-CBSA Snooker Academy in Changping, Dongguan.

== Career ==
=== 2012–2016: Amateur career ===
This boy was astonishingly good and better than anybody I have ever seen at that age – and that includes Ronnie O'Sullivan!

— Steve Davis

In June 2012, Zhao defeated Xiao Guodong, Kevin McMahon, and Yu Delu to reach the last 16 of the Zhangjiagang Open, where he lost 3‍–‍4 to Stephen Lee. He built on this success by reaching the second round of two Asian Tour Events: the Yixing Open and the Zhengzhou Open.

As a wildcard entrant, he defeated former world champion Ken Doherty at the professional ranking tournament, the 2012 International Championship. He then lost in a deciding frame 5‍–‍6 to Matthew Stevens in the last 32. Having also earned his way to the last 32 of two other events, Zhao began to gain a reputation as a "Wildcard Menace".

He beat six-time world champion Steve Davis 6‍–‍1 at the 2013 International Championship. Davis later described Zhao as "astonishingly good" and compared him with a young Ronnie O'Sullivan. Zhao reached the third round of the competition and was defeated 2‍–‍6 by Marco Fu; the following year, he defeated Fu in the first round of the 2014 Shanghai Masters. In late 2013, he entered the World Amateur Championship and reached the final, where he lost 4‍–‍8 to his fellow countryman Zhou Yuelong, missing the chance to join the main professional snooker tour for the 2014‍–‍15 season.

Zhao was narrowly defeated in the first round of the ACBS Asian Snooker Championship in April 2015. He won three matches in the first event of the 2015 Q School before losing 3‍–‍4 to Alexander Ursenbacher in the penultimate round. He reached the final round of the second Q School event but lost 3‍–‍4 to Duane Jones in a black ball finish in the deciding frame. He completed a 6‍–‍0 whitewash of Stuart Carrington to qualify for the 2015 International Championship, where he lost 2‍–‍6 to John Higgins in the first round. Zhao made his first appearance in a Triple Crown event at the 2015 UK Championship but lost 2‍–‍6 to Mark Allen in the first round. He qualified for the German Masters and the Welsh Open in 2016 but was knocked out in the opening round of both events. He reached the final of the World Amateur Championship in 2015, losing 6‍–‍8 to Pankaj Advani. As runner-up, Zhao received a two-year tour card for the main professional tour when Advani declined the invitation.

=== 2016–2022: Early professional years, 2021 UK Champion ===
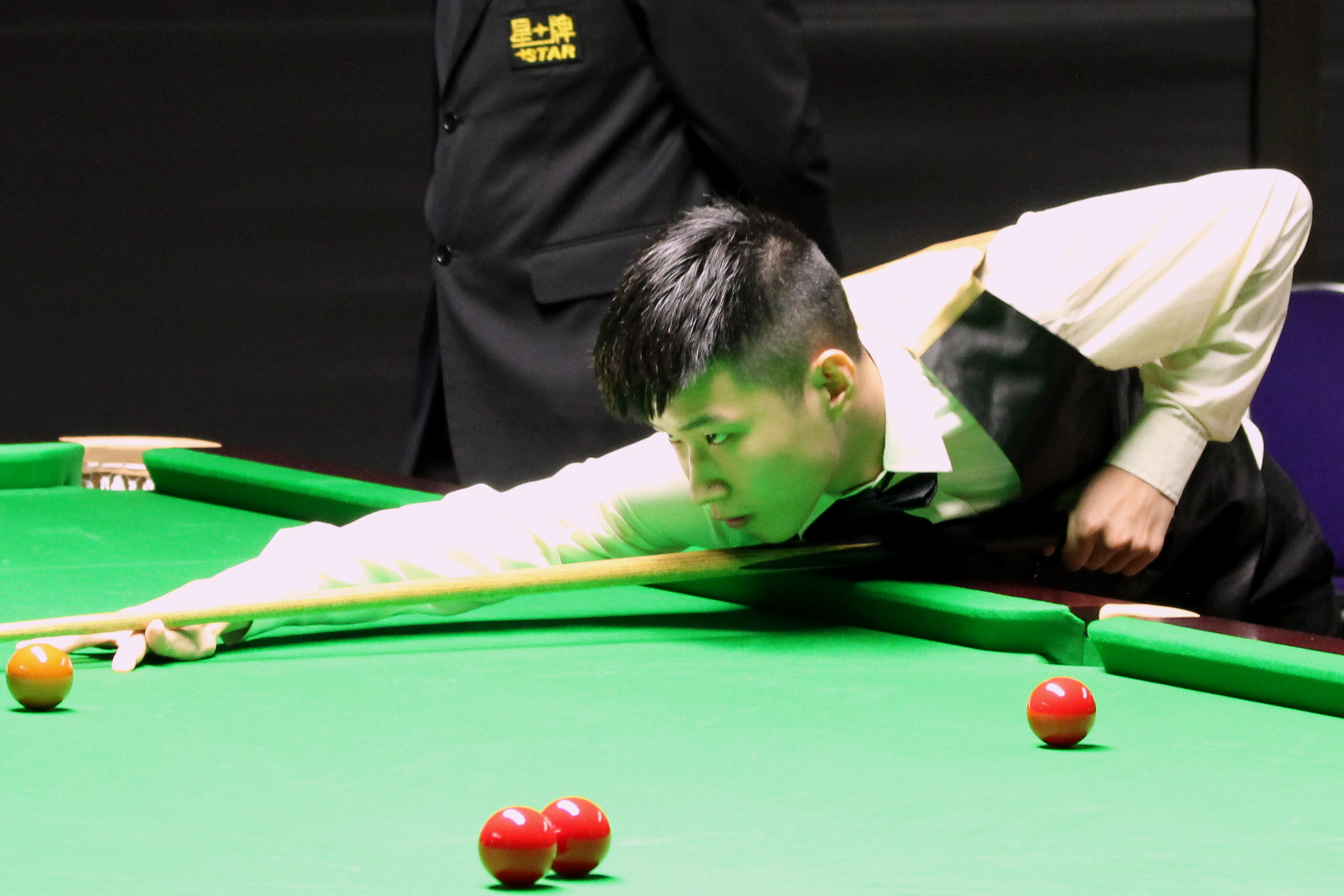
Zhao at the 2016 Paul Hunter Classic

Zhao met Ronnie O'Sullivan in the second round of the 2016 English Open. Breaks of 130, 107 and 80 gave him a 3‍–‍2 lead, but he missed chances to take the win and was defeated 3‍–‍4. O'Sullivan said afterwards that Zhao's attacking style of play had reminded him of seven-time World Champion Stephen Hendry at a similar age. Zhao qualified for the 2017 German Masters by beating Li Hang 5‍–‍3 and John Higgins 5‍–‍1, and a 5‍–‍0 whitewash of Sunny Akani saw Zhao reach the last 16 of a ranking event for the first time. He held a narrow 4‍–‍3 advantage over Ali Carter but lost the last two frames. He also reached the third round of the Gibraltar Open before losing 3‍–‍4 to Mark Williams.

Zhao was not ranked high enough at the end of the 2017‍–‍18 season to retain his spot on the World Snooker Tour, so he entered 2018 Q School in a bid to win back his place. He defeated Dechawat Poomjaeng in the second event final of Q School to regain his professional status. He reached his first professional ranking semi-finals at the 2018 China Championship, where he lost 4‍–‍6 to Mark Selby. He progressed to the quarter-finals of the Welsh Open, losing 2‍–‍5 to eventual finalist Stuart Bingham. Zhao qualified for the World Snooker Championship for the first time in 2019 but lost 7‍–‍10 to Selby in the first round.

In the 2019‍–‍20 season, Zhao reached the last 16 stage of four ranking events and the quarter-finals of the 2020 German Masters, elevating his world ranking to 29th by the end of the season. Snooker professionals Ronnie O'Sullivan, Stephen Hendry and Alan McManus all suggested at the time that Zhao could potentially become a leading player in world snooker due to his enormous potential. In December 2020, Zhao reached the quarter-finals of the World Grand Prix; after beating Jamie Jones 4‍–‍2 in the first round and John Higgins 4‍–‍3 in the second, he was defeated 3‍–‍5 by Jack Lisowski.

Zhao claimed his first ranking title at the 2021 UK Championship, defeating Luca Brecel 10‍–‍5 in the final; the win elevated Zhao to ninth in the snooker world rankings. By entering the elite "top 16", he qualified for the invitational 2022 Masters for the first time, where he played John Higgins in the first round but lost the match 2‍–‍6.

He defeated Yan Bingtao 9‍–‍0 in the final of the 2022 German Masters to claim his second ranking title. Zhao became only the third player, after Steve Davis and Neil Robertson, to win a two-session ranking final by a whitewash. At the 2022 World Snooker Championship, he defeated Jamie Clarke in the first round but lost in the second round to Stephen Maguire.

=== 2023–2024: Professional suspension and ban ===
In January 2023, the sport's governing body, the World Professional Billiards and Snooker Association (WPBSA), suspended Zhao as part of a match-fixing investigation involving ten Chinese players. On 6 June 2023, an independent disciplinary commission ruled that Zhao had not himself fixed any matches, and his involvement was limited to placing bets on behalf of another player (Yan Bingtao) on two of Yan's matches. Zhao was ruled "liable as a party to" the two match fixes in question, which both took place in March 2022: Yan vs Ricky Walden at the 2022 Welsh Open and Yan vs Oliver Lines at the 2022 Turkish Masters. The ruling stated that Zhao had "shown genuine remorse for his actions."

The commission noted the circumstances contributing to Zhao's actions, pointing out that the Chinese players involved in the case lived in close proximity to one another, were "heavily reliant on each other socially and financially", and unable to return to their native China during the COVID-19 pandemic. The situation they found themselves in may have led to loneliness, boredom and isolation, as well as facing the pressure of financial difficulties leading to the onset of "ill-judged gambling and betting habits". It was also noted that the young Chinese players were "particularly susceptible to influence and manipulation from the older Chinese snooker players, who took them under their wing."

Zhao was banned for 30 months and ordered to pay £7,500 in costs, but the WPBSA reduced the ban to 20 months because of Zhao's early admissions and his guilty plea. The Chinese Billiards and Snooker Association (CBSA) upheld the original 30-month ban. WPBSA regulations state that players need to be in "good standing" with their national federation to compete on the World Snooker Tour. The chair of the WPBSA, Jason Ferguson, then confirmed that Zhao's 30-month ban would apply only to events sanctioned and governed by the CBSA. He was therefore eligible to enter the 2024‍–‍25 Q Tour after 1 September 2024 (the date on which the WPBSA ban expired), as well as any other amateur competition not sanctioned by the CBSA.

=== 2024–25 season: World Championship winner ===
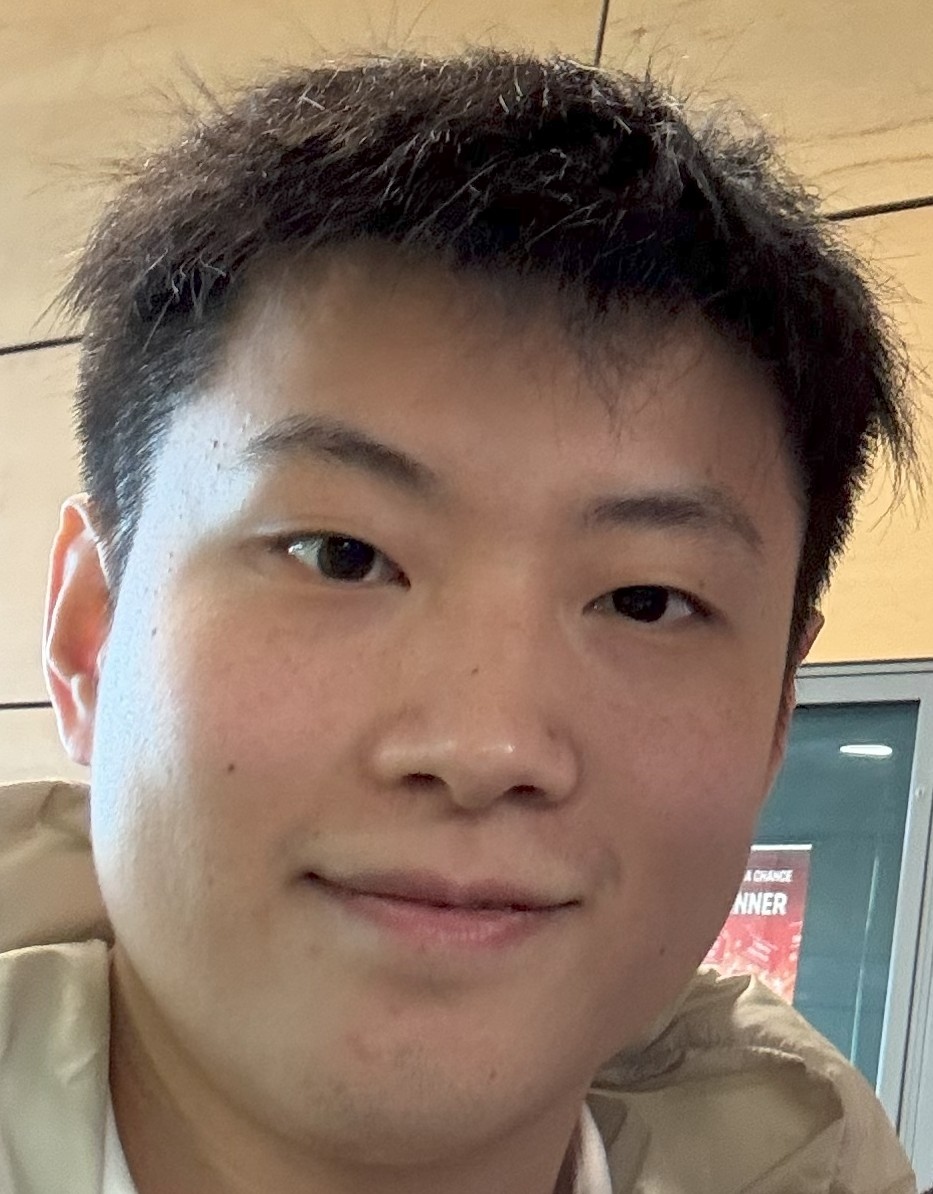
Zhao in 2025

After his competitive ban had expired, Zhao joined the amateur Q Tour in the hope of regaining professional status; his first post-ban match was in September 2024 at Q Tour Event 2 in Sofia. In October, he won Q Tour Event 3 in Stockholm; in the final frame of his 4‍–‍1 win over Shaun Liu in the last-64, Zhao became the first player to make a maximum break on the Q Tour. He won Q Tour Event 4 in Manchester in November, defeating Ryan Davies 4‍–‍2 in the final. On his run to the trophy, he made another maximum break in his 4‍–‍1 quarter-final win over Oliver Sykes, as well as three centuries in defeating Craig Steadman 4‍–‍1 in the semi-finals.

On 5 November 2024, the WPBSA and WST announced that Zhao would be invited to play in the UK Championship (an event he had won in 2021) as a WPBSA qualifier, on account of his winning Q Tour Event 3. He won four qualifying matches to progress to the main stage of the UK Championship but was then eliminated 5‍–‍6 by Shaun Murphy in the first round. Zhao won Q Tour Event 5 in Vienna in December 2024 and Q Tour Event 6 in Mons, Belgium, in January 2025, defeating Australian Ryan Thomerson 4‍–‍2 and Iran's Ehsan Heydari Nezhad 4‍–‍1 in the finals, respectively; at this stage, he had won four straight events and 32 consecutive matches on the Q Tour. His performance in Event 6 guaranteed his place at the top of the Q Tour Europe rankings list, which secured him a new two-year tour card for the 2025‍–‍26 season. Finishing top of the Q Tour Europe rankings list also granted Zhao a spot in the qualifying draw for the 2025 World Snooker Championship.

He won all four of his qualifying matches at the World Championship, earning himself a place in the main stage of the tournament—only the third amateur-ranked player ever to do so. He defeated Jak Jones 10‍–‍4, Lei Peifan 13‍–‍10 and Chris Wakelin 13‍–‍5 to reach the semi-finals, where he beat seven-time world champion Ronnie O'Sullivan 17‍–‍7 with a session to spare. He then defeated Mark Williams 18‍–‍12 in the final to win his first world title. Zhao became the first Chinese player, the first Asian player, and the first amateur to win the World Snooker Championship. He was the fourth player to have won the title after appearing in the qualification event; the other three qualifiers who went on to lift the world trophy were Alex Higgins in 1972, Terry Griffiths in 1979, and Murphy in 2005.

As a result of winning the title, Zhao attained professional status based on ranking points attained during the season, and he entered the world snooker rankings at number 11. The tour card that Zhao had previously attained by topping the Q Tour Europe rankings was awarded to Dylan Emery, who had finished in second place. Zhao finished the 2024‍–‍25 season having played 49 matches since his return to competition and winning 47 of them. He was barred from entering events in mainland China until July 2025, as his original 30-month competitive ban was upheld by the CBSA.

=== 2025–26 season ===
Zhao's first tournament of the new season after winning the World Championship was the 2025 Shanghai Masters. He reached the semi-finals where he was defeated 5–10 by Kyren Wilson. This was the end of a 26-match winning streak for Zhao, following his first-round loss to Murphy at the UK Championship the previous year. After a run of poor form due to illness, Zhao reached his first ranking semi-final of the season at the International Championship in November 2025. He lost 6–9 to compatriot Wu Yize.

At the Riyadh Season Snooker Championship, Zhao won his first title as World Champion, defeating Neil Robertson 5–2 in the final. At the 2026 Masters, Zhao lost 5–6 in the quarter-finals to John Higgins. After making his first maximum break in professional competition during the 2026 Championship League, he won back-to-back ranking titles at the World Grand Prix, beating Zhang Anda 10–6 in the final, and the 2026 Players Championship, defeating Higgins 10–7 in the final. He became the fourth player in professional snooker history to win his first five ranking finals, following Steve Davis, Mark Williams, and Neil Robertson. Following the 2026 Players Championship, he advanced to a career high of fifth in the world rankings. After winning the 2026 Tour Championship by defeating Judd Trump 10–3 in the final, Zhao became the first player to have won all three Players Series tournaments in the same season. He also became the third player to win over £1 million in a single season, following Trump and O'Sullivan. Zhao reached the quarter-finals of the 2026 World Championship, but his attempts to become the first player to overcome the Crucible curse ended when he was defeated 10–13 by Murphy.

== Performance and rankings timeline ==
Tournament	2012/ 13	2013/ 14	2014/ 15	2015/ 16	2016/ 17	2017/ 18	2018/ 19	2019/ 20	2020/ 21	2021/ 22	2022/ 23	2024/ 25	2025/ 26	2026/ 27
Ranking (Note: Shows the ranking at the beginning of the season)	(Note: He was an amateur.)				(Note: New players do not have a ranking.)	72	(Note: Players qualified through Q School start the season without ranking points.)	59	29	26	6	(Note: He was an amateur after his ban ended on 1 September 2024.)	11	3
Ranking tournaments
Championship League	Non-Ranking Event								3R	RR	3R	A	A	RR
China Open	1R	1R	1R	LQ	LQ	LQ	LQ	Tournament Not Held						1R
Wuhan Open	Tournament Not Held											A	2R	F
British Open	Tournament Not Held									1R	2R	A	2R	QF
English Open	Tournament Not Held				2R	2R	2R	4R	2R	2R	2R	A	2R	1R
Shenzhen Open (Note: The event was called the Xi'an Grand Prix (2024/2025–2025/2026))	Tournament Not Held											A	1R	LQ
Northern Ireland Open	Tournament Not Held				1R	2R	1R	1R	4R	LQ	LQ	A	1R	1R
International Championship	1R	3R	2R	1R	1R	1R	2R	1R	Not Held			A	SF	QF
UK Championship	A	A	A	1R	2R	2R	1R	3R	2R	W	1R	1R	2R	
Shoot Out	Non-Ranking Event				2R	1R	3R	2R	WD	1R	WD	A	1R	
Scottish Open	MR	Not Held			1R	1R	3R	1R	2R	LQ	1R	A	2R	
German Masters	A	A	A	1R	2R	LQ	LQ	QF	LQ	W	WD (Note: Zhao initially entered the tournament through the qualifying stages played in November and had progressed to play in the televised stages in Berlin. However, before the main event started, he was suspended by the WPBSA due to a match-fixing investigation and was subsequently withdrawn from the tournament.)	A	1R	
Welsh Open	A	A	A	1R	1R	1R	QF	4R	2R	1R	WD	A	3R	
World Grand Prix	Not Held		NR	DNQ	DNQ	DNQ	1R	2R	QF	1R	DNQ	DNQ	W	
Players Championship (Note: The event was called the Players Tour Championship Grand Final (2012/13–2015/2016))	DNQ	DNQ	DNQ	DNQ	DNQ	DNQ	DNQ	DNQ	DNQ	1R	DNQ	DNQ	W	
World Open	1R	WR	Not Held		LQ	LQ	1R	1R	Not Held			A	3R	
Tour Championship	Tournament Not Held						DNQ	DNQ	DNQ	QF	DNQ	DNQ	W	
World Championship	A	A	A	LQ	LQ	LQ	1R	A	LQ	2R	A	W	QF	
Non-ranking tournaments
Shanghai Masters	Ranking Event						A	A	Not Held			A	SF	SF
Champion of Champions	NH	DNQ	DNQ	DNQ	DNQ	DNQ	DNQ	DNQ	DNQ	DNQ	QF	A	SF	QF
Riyadh Season Championship	Tournament Not Held											A	W	NH
The Masters	DNQ	DNQ	DNQ	DNQ	DNQ	DNQ	DNQ	DNQ	DNQ	1R	WD (Note: Zhao had initially been invited to play in the Masters but was suspended by the WPBSA the week before the tournament started due to a match-fixing investigation and was subsequently withdrawn from the tournament.)	A	QF	
Championship League	A	A	A	A	A	A	A	A	WD	2R	A	A	RR (Note: Zhao withdrew after competing in Group 6)	
Former ranking tournaments
Wuxi Classic	A	WR	3R	Tournament Not Held										
Australian Goldfields Open	A	A	A	LQ	Tournament Not Held									
Shanghai Masters	WR	WR	2R	A	LQ	LQ	Non-Ranking		Not Held			Non-Ranking		
Paul Hunter Classic	Minor-Ranking Event				2R	4R	A	NR	Tournament Not Held					
Indian Open	NH	A	A	NH	1R	1R	2R	Tournament Not Held						
Riga Masters (Note: The event was called the Riga Open (2014/2015–2015/2016))	Not Held		Minor-Rank.		2R	LQ	3R	LQ	Tournament Not Held					
China Championship	Tournament Not Held				NR	LQ	SF	3R	Tournament Not Held					
WST Pro Series	Tournament Not Held								2R	Tournament Not Held				
Turkish Masters	Tournament Not Held									2R	Tournament Not Held			
Gibraltar Open	Not Held			MR	3R	3R	1R	3R	3R	2R	Tournament Not Held			
European Masters	Tournament Not Held				LQ	1R	1R	2R	1R	LQ	2R	Not Held		
Saudi Arabia Masters	Tournament Not Held											A	6R	NH
Former non-ranking tournaments
Macau Masters	Tournament Not Held						RR	Tournament Not Held						
Hong Kong Masters	Tournament Not Held					A	Tournament Not Held				WD	Not Held		
Haining Open	Not Held		Minor-Rank.		A	A	A	3R	NH	A	A	Not Held		

^ Source: "Zhao Xintong (all results)". snooker.org.

Performance Table Legend
LQ	Lost in the qualifying draw	#R	Lost in the early rounds of the tournament (WR = Wildcard round, RR = Round robin)	QF	Lost in the quarter-finals
SF	Lost in the semi-finals	F	Lost in the final	W	Won the tournament
DNQ	Did not qualify for the tournament	A	Did not participate in the tournament	WD	Withdrew from the tournament

NH / Not Held	Means the event was not held
NR / Non-Ranking Event	Means the event is/was no longer a ranking event
R / Ranking Event	Means the event is/was a ranking event
MR / Minor-Ranking Event	Means the event is/was a minor-ranking event

== Career finals ==
=== Ranking finals: 7 (6 titles) ===
Legend
Legend
World Championship (1–0)
UK Championship (1–0)
Other (4–1)

Outcome	No.	Year	Championship	Opponent in the final	Score
Winner	1.	2021	UK Championship	Luca Brecel (BEL)	10–5
Winner	2.	2022	German Masters	Yan Bingtao (CHN)	9–0
Winner	3.	2025	World Snooker Championship	Mark Williams (WAL)	18–12
Winner	4.	2026	World Grand Prix	Zhang Anda (CHN)	10–6
Winner	5.	2026	Players Championship	John Higgins (SCO)	10–7
Winner	6.	2026	Tour Championship	Judd Trump (ENG)	10–3
Runner-up	1.	2026	Wuhan Open	Chang Bingyu (CHN)	7–10

=== Non-ranking finals: 1 (1 title) ===
Outcome	No.	Year	Championship	Opponent in the final	Score
Winner	1.	2025	Riyadh Season Snooker Championship	Neil Robertson (AUS)	5–2

=== Pro-am finals: 1 (1 title) ===
Outcome	No.	Year	Championship	Opponent in the final	Score
Winner	1.	2017	Asian Indoor and Martial Arts Games	Hossein Vafaei (IRN)	4–2

=== Team finals: 2 (1 title) ===
Outcome	No.	Year	Championship	Team	Opponent in the final	Score
Runner-up	1.	2017	CVB Snooker Challenge	China	Great Britain	9–26
Winner	1.	2018	Macau Masters	Barry Hawkins (ENG); Ryan Day (WAL); Zhou Yuelong (CHN)	Mark Williams (WAL); Joe Perry (ENG); Marco Fu (HKG); Zhang Anda (CHN)	5–1

=== Amateur finals: 6 (4 titles) ===
Outcome	No.	Year	Championship	Opponent in the final	Score
Runner-up	1.	2013	IBSF World Snooker Championship	Zhou Yuelong (CHN)	4–8
Runner-up	2.	2015	IBSF World Snooker Championship (2)	Pankaj Advani (IND)	6–8
Winner	1.	2024	Q Tour Event 3	Craig Steadman (ENG)	4–3
Winner	2.	2024	Q Tour Event 4	Ryan Davies (ENG)	4–2
Winner	3.	2024	Q Tour Event 5	Ryan Thomerson (AUS)	4–2
Winner	4.	2025	Q Tour Event 6	Ehsan Heydari Nezhad (IRN)	4–1
