= Riyadh Season Snooker Championship =

Snooker non-ranking tournament in Riyadh, Saudi Arabia

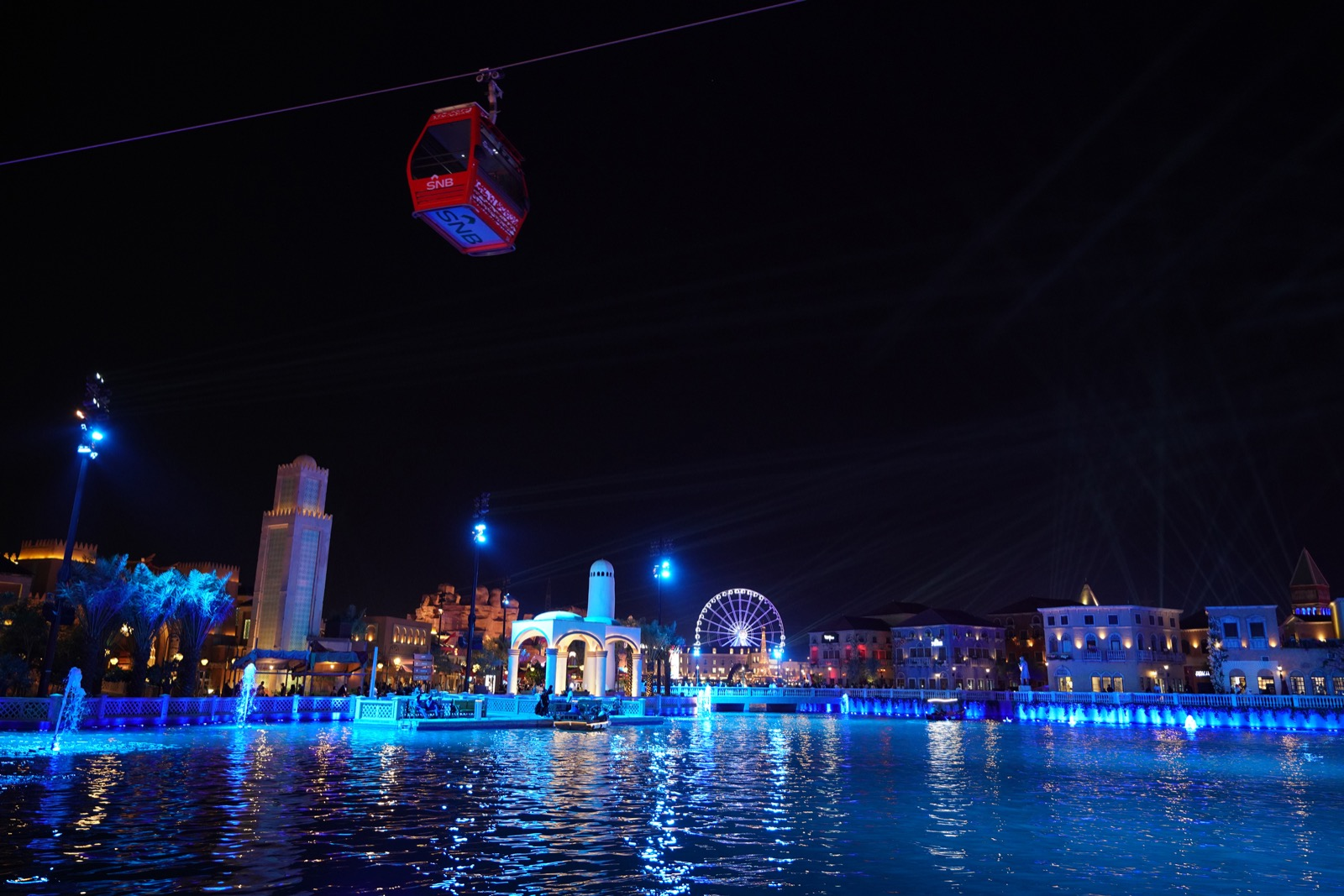
- The tournament has been held in Riyadh's Boulevard City since its inception

Tournament information
- Venue: Global Theatre
- Location: Boulevard City, Riyadh
- Country: Saudi Arabia
- Established: 2024
- Organisation(s): World Snooker Tour
- Format: Non-ranking event
- Total prize fund: £785,000
- Winner's share: £250,000
- Recent edition: 2025
- Current champion: Zhao Xintong (CHN)

The Riyadh Season Snooker Championship is a professional snooker non-ranking tournament held at the Global Theatre in Boulevard City, Riyadh, Saudi Arabia. Organised by the World Snooker Tour as part of the Riyadh Season festival, the tournament introduced a special 20-point gold ball called the "Riyadh Season ball", which could only be potted after a player had completed a maximum break of 147 to extend the break to 167 for a $1,000,000 bonus prize. The event features a total prize fund of £785,000 (excluding the bonus prize), with the winner receiving £250,000, the second highest top prize in professional snooker, tied with The Masters and after the World Championship.

The current champion was Zhao Xintong, who defeated Neil Robertson 5‍–‍2 in the 2025 final.

== History ==
The inaugural event was known as the "World Masters of Snooker"

In December 2019, World Snooker Tour (WST) announced a 10-year deal with Saudi Arabia, including ranking tournaments that will be hosted in the country. However, no snooker tournaments were held in Saudi Arabia in the next four years due to the COVID-19 pandemic. In January 2024, WST announced a new non-ranking tournament called the World Masters of Snooker, scheduled to take place from 4 to 6 March 2024 at the Boulevard Arena in Riyadh, Saudi Arabia. It is the first professional snooker tournament to be held in Saudi Arabia, amid the country's growing investment in various sports.

The 2024 event had a $500,000 (about £395,000) prize for the first player to compile a 167 break, but it was not given as no players achieved the feat, and the prize was increased to $1,000,000 (about £785,000) for the second 2024 event, but was once again not achieved.

The first champion was Ronnie O'Sullivan, who defeated Luca Brecel 5‍–‍2 in the March 2024 final, capturing his fifth professional title of the 2023–24 season. The second event, held in December 2024, was won by Mark Allen, also beating Brecel 5‍–‍1.

== Format ==
Colour	Value
Red	1 point
Yellow	2 points
Green	3 points
Brown	4 points
Blue	5 points
Pink	6 points
Black	7 points
Gold	20 points

The layout of balls in Riyadh Season snooker

The event is played under regular snooker rules, but it uses an additional gold ball worth 20 points, called the "Riyadh Season ball". The gold ball is placed on the centre of the baulk cushion, in line with the brown, blue, pink, and black balls. It can only be potted after a player has completed a maximum break of 147, to extend the break to 167. It's a four-point foul if the gold ball is potted earlier in the frame, or hit before the object ball. The gold ball stays on the table as long as it is possible for either player to complete a maximum break, then it is removed from the table until the next frame.

The event features 12 players, including the top ten players on the snooker world rankings and two local wildcard players.

== Controversies ==
The announcement of the event, hailed as a "huge breakthrough" by WST chairman, Steve Dawson, was met with criticism accusing Saudi Arabia of sportswashing. Amnesty International criticised snooker's involvement in Saudi Arabia, amid its human rights abuses. Peter Frankental, Amnesty International UK's Economic Affairs director, said: "It was just a matter of time before Saudi Arabia's huge sportswashing machine sucked in snooker along with almost every other major world sport. If the likes of Ronnie O'Sullivan and Judd Trump play in Riyadh, they shouldn't hesitate to speak out about human rights." Some players have also criticised WST of overly focusing on events featuring the top players. Amateur player Steven Hallworth tweeted: "Was starting to lose sleep with worry that the top eight players might run out of events and cash soon, thank God for this."

The introduction of the 20-point gold ball was criticised by The Independent journalist Luke Baker, who called it a "ludicrous gimmick" and "the sign of a desperate sport". The Daily Telegraph chief sports writer Oliver Brown described the Saudi invention as "warping the very rules of the game for its own hubristic ends", calling it "frivolous, tasteless, wretched".

== Winners ==
Year	Winner	Runner-up	Final score	Season
World Masters of Snooker
2024	Ronnie O'Sullivan (ENG)	Luca Brecel (BEL)	5‍–‍2	2023/24
Riyadh Season Snooker Championship
2024	Mark Allen (NIR)	Luca Brecel (BEL)	5‍–‍1	2024/25
2025	Zhao Xintong (CHN)	Neil Robertson (AUS)	5‍–‍2	2025/26

== Finalists ==
Name	Nationality	Winner	Runner-up	Finals
**Ronnie O'Sullivan**	England	1	0	1
**Mark Allen**	Northern Ireland	1	0	1
**Zhao Xintong**	China	1	0	1
**Luca Brecel**	Belgium	0	2	2
**Neil Robertson**	Australia	0	1	1

Legend
The names of active players are marked in **bold**.
