= 2024–25 Q Tour =

Series of snooker tournaments

Details
- Duration: 7 March 2024 – 13 March 2025
- Tournaments: 20; Organised by WPBSA: Q Tour Europe (7); Q Tour Global Play-Offs; Regional organisers: Q Tour Americas (4); Q Tour Asia-Pacific (5); Q Tour Middle East (3)

Play-offs and winners
- Location: Antalya, Turkey
- Promoted: Dylan Emery (WAL); Steven Hallworth (ENG); Liam Highfield (ENG); Florian Nüßle (AUT) † † Promoted for the first time

The 2024–25 Q Tour was a series of second-tier snooker tournaments, run by the World Professional Billiards and Snooker Association, that took place during the 2024–25 snooker season for players not on the main World Snooker Tour.

Zhao Xintong is the prize money winner of the tournament. Steven Hallworth, Liam Highfield and Florian Nüßle won their respective Q Tour playoffs to each secure their own two-year tour cards for the subsequent two seasons.

== Overview ==
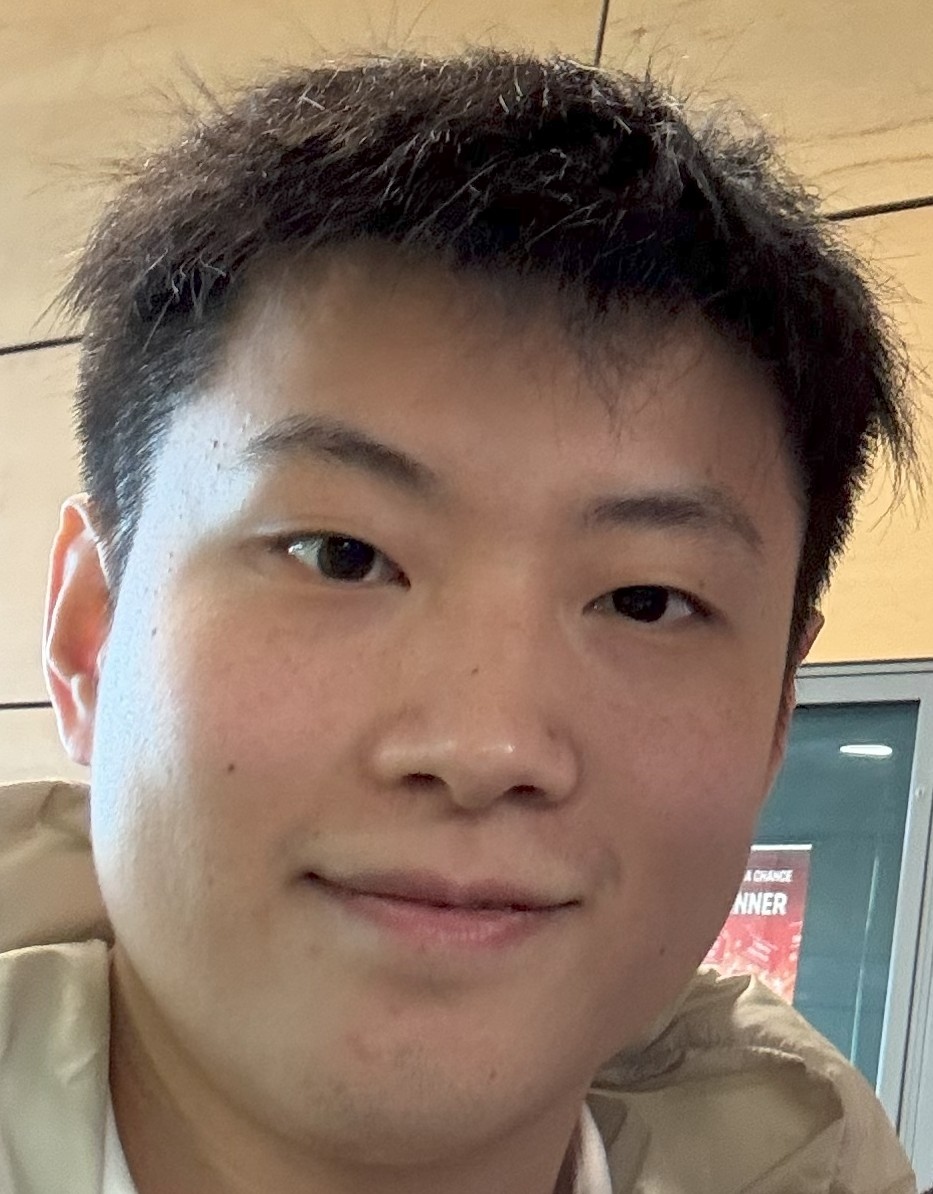
Zhao Xintong is the top finisher in the 2024-25 Q Tour Europe and was initially promoted to the main tour through this route

A series of seven Q Tour Europe events were played, with the leading money-winner gaining a place on the main tour for the 2025–26 snooker season. Eighteen players – the highest-ranked players who had not already secured a place on the main tour for the 2024–25 season – gained entry to a further event, the WPBSA Q Tour Global Play-Off; They were joined by five players from the Q Tour Global qualifying from regional Q Tour series. These players competed for a further three places on the World Snooker Tour. In total, 1542 Q Tour matches were played, competed by 711 players from 54 countries.

This season's tournament saw the integration of CBSA China Tour into the Q Tour's playoff stage for its third-place finisher (as the first and second places directly qualified for the main tour); Luo Honghao was the first snooker player to qualify for the playoffs in such manner.

After returning from a 20-month ban for breaching match-fixing rules, former top-16 professional player Zhao Xintong won four Q Tour Europe events in a row, topping the rankings list and securing a professional tour card for the next two seasons. He made two maximum breaks while competing on the Q Tour, the first ever achieved at Q Tour events. Following the conclusion of the Q Tour, he qualified for and won the 2025 World Snooker Championship, securing professional status by ending the season at 11th place in the world rankings. The tour card Zhao had secured through the Q Tour was then awarded to Dylan Emery, who had finished second in the Q Tour Europe rankings and was thus the highest ranked eligible player. A record-breaking total of seven top-ranked Q Tour players have qualified for the main tour, with the other players qualified through regional championships and Q School.

== Q Tour Europe ==
=== Format ===
Q Tour Europe events are generally played over three days. The first day is an open qualifying day with 16 places available. The main draw starts on the second day when the 16 qualifiers are joined by the 48 seeded players who qualified based on their rankings in the 2024 Q School Orders of Merit to make a first round field of 64 players. There are two rounds on the second day and a further four on the final day, to determine the winner of the event. The 48 who qualified directly included the top 32 eligible players from the 2024 UK Q School Order of Merit, the top eight from the 2024 Asia-Oceania Q School Order of Merit, and the eight highest ranked junior players on the 2024 UK Q School Order of Merit, not already qualified.

=== Prize fund ===
Each Q Tour Europe event featured a prize fund of £14,300 with the winner receiving £3,000.

- Winner: £3,000
- Runner-up: £1,500
- Semi-final: £900
- Quarter-final: £600
- Last 16: £300
- Last 32: £200
- Total: £14,300

=== Schedule ===
The schedule for the seven Q Tour Europe events is given below.

Date		Country	Tournament	Venue	City	Field	Winner	Runner-up	Score	Ref.
15 Aug	18 Aug	ENG	Event 1	Northern Snooker Centre	Leeds	154	(Estonia) Andres Petrov	(Australia) Ryan Thomerson	4–3	
20 Sep	22 Sep	BUL	Event 2	Bulgarian Snooker Academy	Sofia	108	(Wales) Dylan Emery	(England) Harvey Chandler	4–3	
4 Oct	6 Oct	SWE	Event 3	Snookerhallen	Stockholm	116	(China) Zhao Xintong	(England) Craig Steadman	4–3	
7 Nov	10 Nov	ENG	Event 4	Club 200	Manchester	156	(China) Zhao Xintong	(England) Ryan Davies	4–2	
13 Dec	15 Dec	AUT	Event 5	Austrian Snooker Academy	Vienna	103	(China) Zhao Xintong	(Australia) Ryan Thomerson	4–2	
10 Jan	12 Jan	BEL	Event 6	Delta Moon Snooker Club	Mons (Note: This event was originally announced to be held in Zurich, Switzerland.)	87	(China) Zhao Xintong	(Iran) Ehsan Heydari Nezhad	4–1	
7 Feb	9 Feb	ENG	Event 7	Landywood Snooker Club	Great Wyrley	124	(England) Liam Highfield	(Wales) Dylan Emery	4–3	

=== Rankings ===
Below are listed the leading players in the prize money rankings. The top-ranked player gets a place on the main tour for the 2024–25 season. 16 other players—the tournament winners and the highest-ranked players who have not already got a place on the main tour—will gain entry to a further event, the WPBSA Q Tour Global Playoff. Players on equal points are ranked by "countback", with the player having won the most prize money in the latest event played being ranked higher.

Rank	Player	Event 1	Event 2	Event 3	Event 4	Event 5	Event 6	Event 7	Total (£)
1	(China) Zhao Xintong ^	–	0	3,000	3,000	3,000	3,000	–	12,000
2	(Wales) Dylan Emery + *	–	3,000	–	900	200	0	1,500	5,600
3	(England) Liam Highfield %	300	900	0	0	600	200	3,000	5,000
4	(Australia) Ryan Thomerson +	1,500	600	300	0	1,500	0	0	3,900
5	(Estonia) Andres Petrov +	3,000	300	0	0	300	0	–	3,600
6	(England) Craig Steadman +	200	300	1,500	900	200	200	0	3,300
7	(England) Ryan Davies +	900	0	200	1,500	200	200	200	3,200
8	(England) Steven Hallworth %	600	0	900	200	300	900	200	3,100
9	(Ukraine) Iulian Boiko + ^	600	600	–	300	300	200	900	2,900
10	(England) Sean O'Sullivan +	0	300	300	600	900	200	600	2,900
11	(Austria) Florian Nüßle %	300	200	300	200	200	900	600	2,700
12	(England) Harvey Chandler +	0	1,500	200	300	0	300	300	2,600
13	(England) Mark Joyce +	600	900	–	200	0	600	200	2,500
14	(England) Alex Clenshaw +	300	0	600	0	200	200	900	2,200
15	(England) Joshua Thomond +	200	200	200	300	300	600	300	2,100
16	(Iran) Ehsan Heydari Nezhad +	0	–	–	–	0	1,500	200	1,700
17	(England) Oliver Sykes +	200	300	300	600	300	0	0	1,700
18	(England) Kuldesh Johal +	0	600	0	200	0	200	600	1,600
19	(England) Connor Benzey + ^	300	200	0	600	200	0	300	1,600
20	(England) Hayden Staniland	200	0	200	200	900	0	0	1,500

* Qualified for the main tour by order of merit
^ Qualified for the main tour through other means
% Qualified for the main tour as play-offs winners
+ Qualified for the play-offs

=== Event 1 ===
The first Q Tour Europe event took place at Northern Snooker Centre in Leeds from 15 to 18 August 2024. Andres Petrov beat Ryan Thomerson 4–3 in the final. Petrov came from 3–1 down in both the quarter and semi-finals and, after leading 3–0, also won the final in the deciding frame. Thomerson had had to qualify to reach the last-64 stage and won a further five matches to reach the final. The final-day results are given below.

Last 16; Best of 7 frames
Hamim Hussain (ENG)	1
Andres Petrov (EST)	4
Simon Bedford (ENG)	4
Alex Clenshaw (ENG)	1
Mark Joyce (ENG)	4
Peter Lines (ENG)	0
Alex Millington (ENG)	0
Simon Blackwell (ENG)	4
Liam Highfield (ENG)	2
Iulian Boiko (UKR)	4
Florian Nüßle (AUT)	2
Ryan Davies (ENG)	4
Ryan Thomerson (AUS)	4
Umut Dikme (GER)	2
Connor Benzey (ENG)	2
Steven Hallworth (ENG)	4

Quarter-finals; Best of 7 frames
Andres Petrov (EST)	4
Simon Bedford (ENG)	3
Mark Joyce (ENG)	3
Simon Blackwell (ENG)	4
Iulian Boiko (UKR)	2
Ryan Davies (ENG)	4
Ryan Thomerson (AUS)	4
Steven Hallworth (ENG)	3

Semi-finals; Best of 7 frames
Andres Petrov (EST)	4
Simon Blackwell (ENG)	3
Ryan Davies (ENG)	1
Ryan Thomerson (AUS)	4

Final; Best of 7 frames
Andres Petrov (EST)	4
Ryan Thomerson (AUS)	3

=== Event 2 ===
The second Q Tour Europe event took place at the National Snooker Academy of Bulgaria in Sofia from 20 to 22 September 2024. Dylan Emery beat Harvey Chandler 4–3 in the final, winning the last three frames after trailing 1–3. Emery and Liam Highfield both made a 142 total clearance in the first frame of their respective semi-finals, the highest breaks of the event. The final-day results are given below.

Last 16; Best of 7 frames
Oliver Sykes (ENG)	1
Kuldesh Johal (ENG)	4
Dylan Emery (WAL)	4
Mateusz Baranowski (POL)	0
Mark Vincent (ENG)	1
Ryan Thomerson (AUS)	4
Sean O'Sullivan (ENG)	1
Mark Joyce (ENG)	4
Brandon Hall (ENG)	4
Craig Steadman (ENG)	1
Harvey Chandler (ENG)	4
Anton Kazakov (UKR)	1
Iulian Boiko (UKR)	4
Andres Petrov (EST)	3
Liam Highfield (ENG)	4
Joshua Cooper (ENG)	1

Quarter-finals; Best of 7 frames
Kuldesh Johal (ENG)	0
Dylan Emery (WAL)	4
Ryan Thomerson (AUS)	3
Mark Joyce (ENG)	4
Brandon Hall (ENG)	1
Harvey Chandler (ENG)	4
Iulian Boiko (UKR)	1
Liam Highfield (ENG)	4

Semi-finals; Best of 7 frames
Dylan Emery (WAL)	4
Mark Joyce (ENG)	2
Harvey Chandler (ENG)	4
Liam Highfield (ENG)	2

Final; Best of 7 frames
Dylan Emery (WAL)	4
Harvey Chandler (ENG)	3

=== Event 3 ===
The third Q Tour Europe event took place at the Snookerhallen in Stockholm from 4 to 6 October 2024. Zhao Xintong made a maximum break in his last-64 match against Shaun Liu, the first in a Q Tour event. Zhao beat Craig Steadman 4–3 in the final. In the event Zhao won 8 matches and made 8 century breaks. The final-day results are given below.

Last 16; Best of 7 frames
Alfie Davies (WAL)	1
Craig Steadman (ENG)	4
Umut Dikme (GER)	2
Peter Devlin (ENG)	4
Alex Clenshaw (ENG)	4
Rory McLeod (JAM)	0
Florian Nuessle (AUT)	3
Steven Hallworth (ENG)	4
Zhao Xintong (CHN)	4
Peter Lines (ENG)	1
Oliver Sykes (ENG)	3
Nicolas Mortreux (FRA)	4
Barry Pinches (ENG)	4
Sean O'Sullivan (ENG)	0
Ryan Thomerson (AUS)	3
Mateusz Baranowski (POL)	4

Quarter-finals; Best of 7 frames
Craig Steadman (ENG)	4
Peter Devlin (ENG)	1
Alex Clenshaw (ENG)	1
Steven Hallworth (ENG)	4
Zhao Xintong (CHN)	4
Nicolas Mortreux (FRA)	0
Barry Pinches (ENG)	3
Mateusz Baranowski (POL)	4

Semi-finals; Best of 7 frames
Craig Steadman (ENG)	4
Steven Hallworth (ENG)	2
Zhao Xintong (CHN)	4
Mateusz Baranowski (POL)	0

Final; Best of 7 frames
Craig Steadman (ENG)	3
Zhao Xintong (CHN)	4

=== Event 4 ===
The fourth Q Tour Europe event took place at the Club 200 in Manchester from 7 to 10 November 2024. Zhao Xintong made a maximum break in his quarter-final match against Oliver Sykes. Zhao beat Ryan Davies 4–2 in the final to win his second Q Tour Europe event in a row. The final-day results are given below.

Last 16; Best of 7 frames
Connor Benzey (ENG)	4
Joshua Thomond (ENG)	2
Craig Steadman (ENG)	4
Iulian Boiko (UKR)	2
Oliver Sykes (ENG)	4
Aidan Gallagher (ENG)	1
Zhao Xintong (CHN)	4
Hamim Hussain (ENG)	1
James Cahill (ENG)	3
Ryan Davies (ENG)	4
Harvey Chandler (ENG)	2
Sean O'Sullivan (ENG)	4
Kayden Brierley (ENG)	2
Dylan Emery (WAL)	4
Gerard Greene (NIR)	4
Sean Maddocks (ENG)	2

Quarter-finals; Best of 7 frames
Connor Benzey (ENG)	1
Craig Steadman (ENG)	4
Oliver Sykes (ENG)	1
Zhao Xintong (CHN)	4
Ryan Davies (ENG)	4
Sean O'Sullivan (ENG)	2
Dylan Emery (WAL)	4
Gerard Greene (NIR)	2

Semi-finals; Best of 7 frames
Craig Steadman (ENG)	1
Zhao Xintong (CHN)	4
Ryan Davies (ENG)	4
Dylan Emery (WAL)	0

Final; Best of 7 frames
Zhao Xintong (CHN)	4
Ryan Davies (ENG)	2

=== Event 5 ===
The fifth Q Tour Europe event took place at the Austrian Snooker Academy in Vienna from 13 to 15 December 2024. Zhao Xintong defeated Ryan Thomerson 4–2 in the final to win his third Q Tour Europe event and 24th match on the Q Tour in a row. The final-day results are given below.

Last 16; Best of 7 frames
Zhao Xintong (CHN)	4
Steven Hallworth (ENG)	2
Joshua Thomond (ENG)	3
Matthew Glasby (ENG)	4
Iulian Boiko (UKR)	3
Sean O'Sullivan (ENG)	4
Patrick Whelan (ENG)	4
Andres Petrov (EST)	2
Ryan Thomerson (AUS)	4
Mateusz Baranowski (POL)	3
Oliver Sykes (ENG)	1
Liam Highfield (ENG)	4
Asutosh Padhy (IND)	4
Umut Dikme (GER)	3
Hayden Staniland (ENG)	4
Aaron Busuttil (MLT)	1

Quarter-finals; Best of 7 frames
Zhao Xintong (CHN)	4
Matthew Glasby (ENG)	3
Sean O'Sullivan (ENG)	4
Patrick Whelan (ENG)	1
Ryan Thomerson (AUS)	4
Liam Highfield (ENG)	1
Asutosh Padhy (IND)	0
Hayden Staniland (ENG)	4

Semi-finals; Best of 7 frames
Zhao Xintong (CHN)	4
Sean O'Sullivan (ENG)	0
Ryan Thomerson (AUS)	4
Hayden Staniland (ENG)	2

Final; Best of 7 frames
Zhao Xintong (CHN)	4
Ryan Thomerson (AUS)	2

=== Event 6 ===
The sixth Q Tour Europe event took place at the Delta Moon Snooker Club in Mons, Belgium, from 10 to 12 January 2025. In the third frame of his last-64 match against Daan Leyssen, Iulian Boiko made a maximum break, becoming the second player after Zhao Xintong to record a maximum break on the Q Tour. Zhao defeated Ehsan Heydari Nezhad 4–1 in the final to win his fourth Q Tour Europe event and 32nd match on the Q Tour in a row. The final-day results are given below.

Last 16; Best of 7 frames
Patrick Whelan (ENG)	0
Joshua Thomond (ENG)	4
Ashley Hugill (ENG)	1
Steven Hallworth (ENG)	4
Paul Deaville (ENG)	0
Nicolás Mortreux (FRA)	4
Luke Pinches (ENG)	0
Ehsan Heydari Nezhad (IRN)	4
Nathan Jones (ENG)	4
Fergal Quinn (NIR)	1
Zhao Xintong (CHN)	4
Aaron Busuttil (MLT)	1
Harvey Chandler (ENG)	3
Florian Nüßle (AUT)	4
Joshua Cooper (ENG)	3
Mark Joyce (ENG)	4

Quarter-finals; Best of 7 frames
Joshua Thomond (ENG)	0
Steven Hallworth (ENG)	4
Nicolás Mortreux (FRA)	0
Ehsan Heydari Nezhad (IRN)	4
Nathan Jones (ENG)	1
Zhao Xintong (CHN)	4
Florian Nüßle (AUT)	4
Mark Joyce (ENG)	1

Semi-finals; Best of 7 frames
Steven Hallworth (ENG)	3
Ehsan Heydari Nezhad (IRN)	4
Zhao Xintong (CHN)	4
Florian Nüßle (AUT)	0

Final; Best of 7 frames
Ehsan Heydari Nezhad (IRN)	1
Zhao Xintong (CHN)	4

=== Event 7 ===
The seventh Q Tour Europe event was held at the Landywood Snooker Club in Great Wyrley from 7 to 9 February 2025. Liam Highfield defeated Dylan Emery 4‍–‍3 in the final, thereby winning his first Q Tour event. Emery made the highest break of the event, a 140 compiled in his match against Anton Kazakov in the early rounds of the event. The final-day results are given below.

Last 16; Best of 7 frames
Iulian Boiko (UKR)	4
Fergal Quinn (NIR)	2
Sean O'Sullivan (ENG)	4
Alfie Davies (WAL)	1
Shaun Liu (HKG)	4
Harvey Chandler (ENG)	2
Ashley Hugill (ENG)	2
Dylan Emery (WAL)	4
Alex Clenshaw (ENG)	4
Lewis Ullah (ENG)	0
Florian Nüßle (AUT)	4
Riley Powell (WAL)	2
Liam Highfield (ENG)	4
Joshua Thomond (ENG)	0
Connor Benzey (ENG)	2
Kuldesh Johal (ENG)	4

Quarter-finals; Best of 7 frames
Iulian Boiko (UKR)	4
Sean O'Sullivan (ENG)	0
Shaun Liu (HKG)	3
Dylan Emery (WAL)	4
Alex Clenshaw (ENG)	4
Florian Nüßle (AUT)	1
Liam Highfield (ENG)	4
Kuldesh Johal (ENG)	2

Semi-finals; Best of 7 frames
Iulian Boiko (UKR)	3
Dylan Emery (WAL)	4
Alex Clenshaw (ENG)	2
Liam Highfield (ENG)	4

Final; Best of 7 frames
Dylan Emery (WAL)	3
Liam Highfield (ENG)	4

== Q Tour Global ==
The Q Tour Global will consist of regional Q Tour series held outside Europe.

=== Americas series ===
Two players will qualify from a series of events organised by the Pan American Billiards and Snooker Association.

The schedule for the Q Tour Americas events is given below.

Date		Country	Tournament	Venue	City	Field	Winner	Runner-up	Score	Ref.
7 Mar	10 Mar	BRA	Event 1	H Niteroi Hotel	Rio de Janeiro	37	(Brazil) Igor Figueiredo	(Brazil) Noel Rodrigues Moreira	5–1	
31 Oct	3 Nov	BRA	Event 2	H Niteroi Hotel	Rio de Janeiro	37	(Brazil) Claudio Menechini	(Brazil) Dhiones Moraes Arent	5–1	
13 Dec	15 Dec	USA	Event 3	Arizona Snooker Academy	Chandler	20	(United States) Andy McCloskey	(United States) Ajeya Prabhakar	4–2	
17 Jan	19 Jan	CAN	Event 4	The Corner Bank	Toronto	16	(Canada) Vito Puopolo	(Canada) Indi Lotey	5–0	

=== Asia-Pacific series ===
One player will qualify from a series of events organised by the Asia-Pacific Snooker and Billiards Federation.

The schedule for the Q Tour Asia-Pacific events is given below.

Date		Country	Tournament	Venue	City	Field	Winner	Runner-up	Score	Ref.
28 Jun	30 Jun	AUS	Event 1 (Note: Event also known as the West Coast International.)	Pot Black Snooker Centre	North Perth	44	(Australia) Vinnie Calabrese	(Australia) Ben Foster	5–4	
2 Aug	4 Aug	AUS	Event 2 (Note: Event also known as the Fred Osbourne Classic.)	Commercial Club	Albury	81	(Australia) Vinnie Calabrese	(Australia) Hassan Kerde	4–2	
26 Sep	29 Sep	NZL	Event 3 (Note: Event also known as the New Zealand Open.)	Papatoetoe Cosmopolitan Club	Auckland	30	(New Zealand) Matthew Scarborough	(England) Lawrence Millington	6–3	
10 Oct	13 Oct	AUS	Event 4 (Note: Event also known as the Bob Hawke AC Australian Open.)	Mounties Club	Sydney	92	(Australia) Vinnie Calabrese	(Australia) Hassan Kerde	6–5	
24 Jan	27 Jan	AUS	Event 5 (Note: Event also known as the Clem Jones AO Queensland Open.)	Redcliffe Snooker Club	Redcliffe	66	(Australia) Vinnie Calabrese	(Australia) Shaun Dalitz	5–1	

=== Middle East series ===
Two players will qualify from a series of events played in the Middle East.

The schedule for the Q Tour Middle East events is given below.

Date		Country	Tournament	Venue	City	Field	Winner	Runner-up	Score	Ref.
21 May	23 May	BHR	Event 1	Bahrain Snooker Academy	Manama	40	(Bahrain) Habib Subah Humood	(Turkey) Ismail Türker	4–1	
19 Jul	21 Jul	UAE	Event 2	Emirates Snooker Academy	Abu Dhabi	56	(Iran) Ali Gharahgozlou	(Iran) Amin Sanjael	4–1	
16 Jan	18 Jan	UAE	Event 3	Cue Sports Academy	Abu Dhabi	25	(Iran) Ali Gharahgozlou	(Turkey) Ismail Türker	4–2	

== Q Tour Playoff ==
The final event, the WPBSA Q Tour Playoff, was held at the Pine Beach Belek Hotel in Antalya, Turkey, from 11 to 13 March. Steven Hallworth, Liam Highfield and Florian Nüßle won their respective playoffs, gaining two-year tour cards starting from the 2025–26 season. Mark Joyce made the highest break of the event, a 147 maximum break in his 6‍–‍2 victory over Dylan Emery in the semi-final of Playoff 1. It was the fourth maximum ever compiled on the Q Tour. The complete results are shown below.

=== Prize fund ===
The prize money for each play-off is shown below.

- Winner: £2,000
- Runner-up: £1,000
- Semi-final: £750
- Quarter-final: £500
- Total: £19,500

=== Playoff 1 ===
Quarter-finals; Best of 9 frames
(Wales) Dylan Emery	5
(Iran) Ali Gharahgozlou	2
(England) Connor Benzey	2
(England) Mark Joyce	5
(England) Steven Hallworth	5
(China) Luo Honghao	3
(England) Kuldesh Johal	4
(England) Ryan Davies	5

Semi-finals; Best of 11 frames
(Wales) Dylan Emery	2
(England) Mark Joyce	6
(England) Steven Hallworth	6
(England) Ryan Davies	1

Final; Best of 19 frames
(England) Mark Joyce	5
(England) Steven Hallworth	10

=== Playoff 2 ===
Quarter-finals; Best of 9 frames
(England) Liam Highfield	5
(Bahrain) Habib Subah Humood	1
(Brazil) Dhiones Moraes Arent	0
(England) Harvey Chandler	5
(Ukraine) Iulian Boiko	5
(England) Alex Clenshaw	2
(Australia) Vinnie Calabrese	5
(England) Craig Steadman	1

Semi-finals; Best of 11 frames
(England) Liam Highfield	6
(England) Harvey Chandler	2
(Ukraine) Iulian Boiko	6
(Australia) Vinnie Calabrese	5

Final; Best of 19 frames
(England) Liam Highfield	10
(Ukraine) Iulian Boiko	3

=== Playoff 3 ===
Quarter-finals; Best of 9 frames
(Australia) Ryan Thomerson	1
(Iran) Ehsan Heydari Nezhad	5
(England) Joshua Thomond	3
(Austria) Florian Nüßle	5
(England) Sean O'Sullivan	1
(England) Oliver Sykes	5
(Canada) Vito Puopolo	2
(Estonia) Andres Petrov	5

Semi-finals; Best of 11 frames
(Iran) Ehsan Heydari Nezhad	3
(Austria) Florian Nüßle	6
(England) Oliver Sykes	3
(Estonia) Andres Petrov	6

Final; Best of 19 frames
(Austria) Florian Nüßle	10
(Estonia) Andres Petrov	3
