= 2019 World Open (snooker) =

Snooker tournament

2019 Yushan World Open
Tournament information
- Dates: 28 October – 3 November 2019
- Venue: Yushan Sport Centre
- City: Yushan
- Country: China
- Organisation: World Snooker
- Format: Ranking event
- Total prize fund: £772,000
- Winner's share: £150,000
- Highest break: Jack Lisowski (ENG) (145)

Final
- Champion: Judd Trump (ENG)
- Runner-up: Thepchaiya Un-Nooh (THA)
- Score: 10–5

The 2019 World Open (also known as the 2019 Yushan World Open) was a professional snooker tournament that took place between 28 October and 3 November 2019 at the Yushan Sport Centre in Yushan, China. This was the 2019 edition of the World Open, which was first held in 1982. It was the fifth ranking event of the 2019–20 season and the third tournament of the season to be held in China. It would also be the last professional snooker tournament held in mainland China for almost four years, due to the impact of the COVID-19 pandemic. The event featured a prize fund of £772,000 with the winner receiving £150,000.

Mark Williams was the defending champion, having won the 2018 event, defeating David Gilbert 10–9 in the final. Williams did not enter this year's tournament. The two finalists were Judd Trump and Thepchaiya Un-Nooh, after Trump defeated John Higgins and Un-Nooh defeated Kyren Wilson in the semi-finals by the same 6–5 scoreline. Trump won the tournament, for his 13th ranking event title, defeating Un-Nooh 10–5 in the final.

== Tournament format ==
The 2019 World Open was a professional snooker tournament held at the Yushan Sport Centre in Yushan, China between 28 October and 3 November 2019. This was the 2019 edition of the World Open tournament, the first having been held in 1982 as the 1982 Professional Players Tournament. It was the fifth ranking event of the 2019/20 snooker season following the English Open and preceding the Northern Ireland Open. It was played as the best-of-9-frames until the semi-finals, which were best-of-11-frames, followed by a best-of-19-frames final. The event featured 64 participants from the World Snooker Tour with a single qualifying round. The World Professional Billiards and Snooker Association and World Snooker organised the World Open. It would be the last professional snooker tournament held in mainland China for almost four years, due to the impact of the COVID-19 pandemic.

=== Prize fund ===
A total of £772,000 was awarded as prize money for the event, with the winner receiving £150,000. This was £37,000 more than the prior year's event. This meant an increase in the prize money for the last 64 losers from £4,000 to £5,000 and a rise for the last 16 from £13,000 to £13,500. The breakdown of prize money for this year was:

- Winner: £150,000
- Runner-up: £75,000
- Semi-final: £32,500
- Quarter-final: £20,000
- Last 16: £13,500
- Last 32: £8,000
- Last 64: £5,000
- Total: £772,000

== Tournament summary ==
The 2019 World Open was held from 28 October until 3 November 2019 at the Yushan Sport Centre in Yushan, China. The defending champion, Mark Williams, declined to appear at the tournament. Qualifying for the event was held at the Barnsley Metrodome in Barnsley, South Yorkshire, from 3–5 October 2019 and in Yushan on 28 October. Neil Robertson failed to show up for his qualifying match, as he accidentally drove to Barnsley, Gloucestershire. World Snooker later made fun of him for mistaking the location of the qualifiers by sending him a map to the site of the next event—the English Open. With Robertson being forced to withdraw, Ian Burns was awarded a bye.

The world number two Ronnie O'Sullivan failed to progress through qualifying. He played Welsh player Dominic Dale, who had failed to defeat O'Sullivan after ten attempts, and lost 3–5. Dale commented the win had "only taken 27 years". The rest of the top-16 players successfully qualified for the event, with John Higgins defeating Chen Zifan and Stephen Maguire defeating Oliver Lines. Another qualifying upset was Elliot Slessor recovering from 2–4 behind to defeat two-time ranking event winner Ryan Day 5–4.

=== Early rounds (round one—quarter-finals) ===
Having won the previous event at the English Open, Mark Selby won both of his first two matches over Anthony Hamilton and Noppon Saengkham. He met 2015 World Snooker Championship winner Stuart Bingham in the last 16, where he lost 2–5. Selby won both of the opening two frames, before Bingham won the next five frames with breaks of 108, 97, 114, 104 and 117. Bingham met four-time World Champion John Higgins in the quarter-finals, losing 2–5.

The runner-up at the English Open, David Gilbert defeated Zhao Xintong 5–4, before a whitewash of Anthony McGill 5–0 and a 5–3 win over Mark Allen. Gilbert met Thailand's Thepchaiya Un-Nooh in the quarter-finals. Un-Nooh, ranked 37th in the world, led 2–1 before breaks of 100, 55 and 62 from Gilbert saw him go behind 2–4. Un-Nooh won the next three frames with breaks of 77, 66 and 96 in just 37 minutes to reach the semi-finals.

Reigning World Champion Judd Trump was tied at 4–4 with Sam Craigie in his first round match despite leading at 3–0 but won the deciding frame. He then defeated Liang Wenbo 5–3 before another deciding frame win over Joe Perry. His quarter-final match was against Michael Holt. Had he won the event, he was the last remaining player who could qualify for the Champion of Champions event ahead of Jimmy White. Trump however, won the match 5–1, having led at 4–0. The fourth and final semi-finalist was two-time ranking winner Kyren Wilson, who defeated, Robbie Williams 5–2, Hossein Vafaei 5–4, Jack Lisowski 5–1, and Zhou Yuelong 5–3.

=== Later rounds (semi-final—final) ===
The two semi-finals were held on 2 November 2019. Both matches were played as best-of-11 frames; both finished at 6–5. The first semi-final was played between Wilson and Un-Nooh. Wilson won the opening three frames of the match; whose highest break during this time was a 44. Un-Nooh won frame four, before Wilson won the next frame to lead 4–1. Un-Nooh won the next two frames, including a break of 74, but Wilson won frame eight to lead 5–3. Un-Nooh won the next two frames to force a deciding frame. Wilson made the first break of the final frame but made only 38 before Un-Nooh made a break of 61. The match was decided after Wilson missed a yellow ball, allowing Un-Nooh to win frame and the match.

The second semi-final was a rematch of the 2019 World Snooker Championship final between Trump and Higgins. Trump took the opening frame. Higgins took the next two with two breaks of more than 50. Trump won the next four frames, including a break of 99. With neither opponent playing well, Higgins won the next three frames which also set up a deciding frame. Trump gained the first chance of frame 11, scoring a 55, before Higgins made a break of 15. Higgins missed a pink ball into the middle pocket allowing Trump to clear the table and win the match 6–5.

The final was held between Judd Trump and Thepchaiya Un-Nooh on 3 November 2019. This was Thepchaiya's second ranking event final, having won the 2019 Snooker Shoot Out. Trump was contesting his 22nd ranking event final. The match was also a rematch of the first-round match of the World Championships, where Trump defeated Un-Nooh 10–9. Trump took an early lead in the match winning the first session 7–2. Frame seven was awarded to Trump, after Un-Nooh failed to hit the red ball on three consecutive attempts. Un-Nooh won the next three frames to trail at 7–5, before Trump won three straight frames to win the championship and his 13th ranking event. The victory put Trump level with Ding Junhui into eighth for the most ranking event titles won.

== Main draw ==
Players shown in bold denote match winners. The draw for the main competition is shown below. (Note: Player's displayed as "w/o" refers to a walkover win, whilst "w/d" refers to a withdrawn player.)

**Last 64**; Best of 9 frames
**Judd Trump (ENG)** | **5**
Sam Craigie (ENG) | 4
Barry Pinches (ENG) | 0
**Liang Wenbo (CHN)** | **5**
**Joe Perry (ENG)** | **5**
Michael Georgiou (CYP) | 2
Yan Bingtao (CHN) | 1
**Stuart Carrington (ENG)** | **5**
**Michael Holt (ENG)** | **5**
Luca Brecel (BEL) | 2
Marco Fu (HKG) | 3
**Barry Hawkins (ENG)** | **5**
**Martin O'Donnell (ENG)** | **5**
Chang Bingyu (CHN) | 3
Liam Highfield (ENG) | w/d
**Ding Junhui (CHN)** | **w/o**
**Mark Selby (ENG)** | **5**
Anthony Hamilton (ENG) | 3
Ricky Walden (ENG) | 3
**Noppon Saengkham (THA)** | **5**
**Stuart Bingham (ENG)** | **5**
Nigel Bond (ENG) | 3
**Jimmy Robertson (ENG)** | **5**
Jackson Page (WAL) | 0
Jordan Brown (NIR) | 2
**Graeme Dott (SCO)** | **5**
Alan McManus (SCO) | 2
**Shaun Murphy (ENG)** | **5**
**Mark Davis (ENG)** | **5**
Matthew Selt (ENG) | 0
Lu Ning (CHN) | 4
**John Higgins (SCO)** | **5**
Ian Burns (ENG) | 1
**Craig Steadman (ENG)** | **5**
Zhang Yang (CHN) | 1
**Thepchaiya Un-Nooh (THA)** | **5**
Stephen Maguire (SCO) | w/d
**Sunny Akani (THA)** | **w/o**
**Elliot Slessor (ENG)** | **5**
Xu Si (CHN) | 3
Matthew Stevens (WAL) | 2
**Anthony McGill (SCO)** | **5**
Zhao Xintong (CHN) | 4
**David Gilbert (ENG)** | **5**
Li Hang (CHN) | 3
**Zhang Anda (CHN)** | **5**
Ken Doherty (IRL) | 3
**Mark Allen (NIR)** | **5**
**Kyren Wilson (ENG)** | **5**
Robbie Williams (ENG) | 2
Lyu Haotian (CHN) | 1
**Hossein Vafaei (IRN)** | **5**
**Jack Lisowski (ENG)** | **5**
Luo Honghao (CHN) | 1
**Xiao Guodong (CHN)** | **5**
Harvey Chandler (ENG) | 0
**Alfie Burden (ENG)** | **5**
Mei Xiwen (CHN) | 2
Igor Figueiredo (BRA) | 1
**Ali Carter (ENG)** | **5**
**Zhou Yuelong (CHN)** | **5**
Ben Woollaston (ENG) | 1
**Fergal O'Brien (IRL)** | **5**
Dominic Dale (WAL) | 3

**Last 32**; Best of 9 frames
**(England) Judd Trump** | **5**
(China) Liang Wenbo | 3
**(England) Joe Perry** | **5**
(England) Stuart Carrington | 3
**(England) Michael Holt** | **5**
(England) Barry Hawkins | 3
(England) Martin O'Donnell | 2
**(China) Ding Junhui** | **5**
**(England) Mark Selby** | **5**
(Thailand) Noppon Saengkham | 2
**(England) Stuart Bingham** | **5**
(England) Jimmy Robertson | 3
**(Scotland) Graeme Dott** | **5**
(England) Shaun Murphy | 1
(England) Mark Davis | 1
**(Scotland) John Higgins** | **5**
(England) Craig Steadman | 2
**(Thailand) Thepchaiya Un-Nooh** | **5**
**(Thailand) Sunny Akani** | **5**
(England) Elliot Slessor | 1
(Scotland) Anthony McGill | 0
**(England) David Gilbert** | **5**
(China) Zhang Anda | 3
**(Northern Ireland) Mark Allen** | **5**
**(England) Kyren Wilson** | **5**
(Iran) Hossein Vafaei | 4
**(England) Jack Lisowski** | **5**
(China) Xiao Guodong | 1
(England) Alfie Burden | 2
**(England) Ali Carter** | **5**
**(China) Zhou Yuelong** | **5**
(Republic of Ireland) Fergal O'Brien | 0

**Last 16**; Best of 9 frames
**(England) Judd Trump** | **5**
(England) Joe Perry | 4
**(England) Michael Holt** | **5**
(China) Ding Junhui | 1
(England) Mark Selby | 2
**(England) Stuart Bingham** | **5**
(Scotland) Graeme Dott | 4
**(Scotland) John Higgins** | **5**
**(Thailand) Thepchaiya Un-Nooh** | **5**
(Thailand) Sunny Akani | 3
**(England) David Gilbert** | **5**
(Northern Ireland) Mark Allen | 3
**(England) Kyren Wilson** | **5**
(England) Jack Lisowski | 1
(England) Ali Carter | 2
**(China) Zhou Yuelong** | **5**

**Quarter-finals**; Best of 9 frames
**(England) Judd Trump** | **5**
(England) Michael Holt | 1
(England) Stuart Bingham | 2
**(Scotland) John Higgins** | **5**
**(Thailand) Thepchaiya Un-Nooh** | **5**
(England) David Gilbert | 4
**(England) Kyren Wilson** | **5**
(China) Zhou Yuelong | 3

**Semi-finals**; Best of 11 frames
**(England) Judd Trump** | **6**
(Scotland) John Higgins | 5
**(Thailand) Thepchaiya Un-Nooh** | **6**
(England) Kyren Wilson | 5

**Final**; Best of 19 frames
**(England) Judd Trump** | **10**
(Thailand) Thepchaiya Un-Nooh | 5

=== Final ===
Final: Best of 19 frames; Referee: Wang Wei. Yushan Sport Centre, Yushan, China, 3 November 2019.
| **Judd Trump**; England | **10**–5 | Thepchaiya Un-Nooh; Thailand |
Afternoon: **63**–16, 62–**66**, **101**–4, **87**–18, **96**–0, **85**–14, **15**–0, (Note: Un-Nooh conceded the frame due to the three-miss rule.) **106**–12, 66–**73**; Evening: **65**–20, 53–**65**, 13–**80**, 8–**105**, **136**–0 (136), **98**–16
| **136** | Highest break | 80 |
| **1** | Century breaks | 0 |

== Qualifying ==
Most of the qualifying matches for the event were played between 2 and 5 October 2019 at the Barnsley Metrodome in Barnsley, England. Matches involving Judd Trump, Yan Bingtao, Luca Brecel, Ding Junhui, Lu Ning, Scott Donaldson, Ken Doherty and Ronnie O'Sullivan, were held over and played in Yushan on the opening day of the tournament main stage. All qualifying matches were best-of-9-frames.

| Judd Trump (ENG) | 5–0 | Zhang Jiankang (CHN) |
| Sam Craigie (ENG) | 5–0 | Fraser Patrick (SCO) |
| Robert Milkins (ENG) | 3–5 | Barry Pinches (ENG) |
| Liang Wenbo (CHN) | 5–1 | Kacper Filipiak (POL) |
| Joe Perry (ENG) | 5–2 | Lei Peifan (CHN) |
| Michael Georgiou (CYP) | 5–2 | David Grace (ENG) |
| Yan Bingtao (CHN) | 5–4 | Bai Langning (CHN) |
| Stuart Carrington (ENG) | 5–3 | Joe O'Connor (ENG) |
| Michael Holt (ENG) | 5–3 | James Wattana (THA) |
| Luca Brecel (BEL) | 5–2 | Wu Yize (CHN) |
| Marco Fu (HKG) | 5–3 | Brandon Sargeant (ENG) |
| Barry Hawkins (ENG) | 5–1 | Jak Jones (WAL) |
| Martin O'Donnell (ENG) | 5–3 | Kishan Hirani (WAL) |
| Tom Ford (ENG) | 4–5 | Chang Bingyu (CHN) |
| Liam Highfield (ENG) | 5–0 | Andy Lee (HKG) |
| Ding Junhui (CHN) | 5–2 | Billy Joe Castle (ENG) |
| Mark Selby (ENG) | 5–2 | Jamie Clarke (WAL) |
| Anthony Hamilton (ENG) | 5–3 | Jimmy White (ENG) |
| Ricky Walden (ENG) | 5–4 | Lee Walker (WAL) |
| Noppon Saengkham (THA) | 5–1 | Simon Lichtenberg (GER) |
| Stuart Bingham (ENG) | 5–0 | Alex Borg (MLT) |
| Daniel Wells (WAL) | 2–5 | Nigel Bond (ENG) |
| Jimmy Robertson (ENG) | 5–2 | Duane Jones (WAL) |
| Ross Bulman (IRL) | 2–5 | Jackson Page (WAL) |
| Michael White (WAL) | 2–5 | Jordan Brown (NIR) |
| Graeme Dott (SCO) | 5–3 | Hammad Miah (ENG) |
| Alan McManus (SCO) | 5–2 | Peter Lines (ENG) |
| Shaun Murphy (ENG) | 5–1 | Rod Lawler (ENG) |
| Mark Davis (ENG) | 5–1 | Sam Baird (ENG) |
| Matthew Selt (ENG) | 5–3 | Si Jiahui (CHN) |
| Lu Ning (CHN) | 5–1 | Gao Yang (CHN) |
| John Higgins (SCO) | 5–2 | Chen Zifan (CHN) |

| Neil Robertson (AUS) | w/d–w/o | Ian Burns (ENG) |
| Mike Dunn (ENG) | 3–5 | Craig Steadman (ENG) |
| Scott Donaldson (SCO) | 4–5 | Zhang Yang (CHN) |
| Thepchaiya Un-Nooh (THA) | 5–1 | Jamie O'Neill (ENG) |
| Stephen Maguire (SCO) | 5–2 | Oliver Lines (ENG) |
| Sunny Akani (THA) | 5–1 | Fan Zhengyi (CHN) |
| Ryan Day (WAL) | 4–5 | Elliot Slessor (ENG) |
| Mark Joyce (ENG) | 3–5 | Xu Si (CHN) |
| Matthew Stevens (WAL) | 5–2 | Thor Chuan Leong (MYS) |
| Anthony McGill (SCO) | 5–1 | Riley Parsons (ENG) |
| Zhao Xintong (CHN) | 5–1 | Andy Hicks (ENG) |
| David Gilbert (ENG) | 5–4 | John Astley (ENG) |
| Li Hang (CHN) | 5–3 | Soheil Vahedi (IRN) |
| Mark King (ENG) | 3–5 | Zhang Anda (CHN) |
| Ken Doherty (IRL) | 5–3 | Li Yingdong (CHN) |
| Mark Allen (NIR) | 5–1 | James Cahill (ENG) |
| Kyren Wilson (ENG) | 5–3 | Chen Feilong (CHN) |
| Robbie Williams (ENG) | 5–1 | Eden Sharav (ISR) |
| Lyu Haotian (CHN) | 5–1 | Alexander Ursenbacher (SUI) |
| Hossein Vafaei (IRN) | 5–1 | Mitchell Mann (ENG) |
| Jack Lisowski (ENG) | 5–3 | Tian Pengfei (CHN) |
| Andrew Higginson (ENG) | 2–5 | Luo Honghao (CHN) |
| Xiao Guodong (CHN) | 5–4 | Gerard Greene (NIR) |
| Kurt Maflin (NOR) | 4–5 | Harvey Chandler (ENG) |
| Chris Wakelin (ENG) | 3–5 | Alfie Burden (ENG) |
| Gary Wilson (ENG) | 2–5 | Mei Xiwen (CHN) |
| Yuan Sijun (CHN) | 3–5 | Igor Figueiredo (BRA) |
| Ali Carter (ENG) | 5–4 | David Lilley (ENG) |
| Zhou Yuelong (CHN) | 5–2 | Ashley Carty (ENG) |
| Ben Woollaston (ENG) | 5–3 | Louis Heathcote (ENG) |
| Fergal O'Brien (IRL) | 5–4 | Adam Stefanow (POL) |
| Ronnie O'Sullivan (ENG) | 3–5 | Dominic Dale (WAL) |

== Century breaks ==
=== Main stage centuries ===
A total of 64 century breaks were made by 26 players during the main event. Judd Trump's break of 104 and Wu Yize's 130 break were made in held over matches played on the first day of the main tournament.

- 144, 136, 135, 129, 113, 105, 104 – Judd Trump
- 141, 108, 101 – Ali Carter
- 138, 121, 120, 117, 114, 110, 108, 104, 103 – Stuart Bingham
- 134, 131, 127, 106 – Zhou Yuelong
- 134 – Zhao Xintong
- 130, 129, 113, 108 – Mark Allen
- 130 – Wu Yize
- 129, 123, 103, 101 – Joe Perry
- 127 – John Higgins
- 124, 121 – Michael Holt
- 123, 116 – Alfie Burden
- 123 – Lyu Haotian
- 122 – Ding Junhui
- 119, 108, 104, 102 – Kyren Wilson
- 116 – Chang Bingyu
- 114, 110, 102, 100 – David Gilbert
- 114, 100 – Matthew Stevens
- 111 – Mark Selby
- 108 – Ken Doherty
- 107, 104 – Fergal O'Brien
- 104, 102, 102 – Thepchaiya Un-Nooh
- 104 – Sam Craigie
- 104 – Graeme Dott
- 102, 101 – Mark Davis
- 101 – Stuart Carrington
- 100 – Noppon Saengkham

=== Qualifying stage centuries ===
A total of 32 century breaks were made by 32 players during the qualifying stage for the event.

- 145 – Jack Lisowski
- 136 – Mei Xiwen
- 136 – Kyren Wilson
- 135 – Jimmy Robertson
- 133 – Joe Perry
- 131 – Matthew Selt
- 130 – Robbie Williams
- 126 – Anthony McGill
- 125 – Michael Georgiou
- 124 – Ross Bulman
- 123 – Jimmy White
- 122 – Chen Feilong
- 122 – Mark Selby
- 119 – Noppon Saengkham
- 119 – Xu Si
- 116 – Michael White
- 113 – Thepchaiya Un-Nooh
- 111 – Robert Milkins
- 109 – Nigel Bond
- 108 – Barry Hawkins
- 106 – Mark Allen
- 105 – Sam Craigie
- 105 – Kishan Hirani
- 105 – Martin O'Donnell
- 103 – Li Hang
- 103 – Ricky Walden
- 102 – Ali Carter
- 102 – Anthony Hamilton
- 100 – Harvey Chandler
- 100 – Andrew Higginson
- 100 – David Lilley
- 100 – Matthew Stevens
