= 2024 Riyadh Season Snooker Championship =

Tournament information
- Dates: 18–20 December 2024
- Venue: Global Theatre
- City: Boulevard City, Riyadh
- Country: Saudi Arabia
- Organisation: World Snooker Tour
- Format: Non-ranking event
- Total prize fund: £785,000
- Winner's share: £250,000
- Highest break: Ding Junhui (CHN) (143)

Final
- Champion: Mark Allen (NIR)
- Runner-up: Luca Brecel (BEL)
- Score: 5–1

The 2024 Riyadh Season Snooker Championship was a professional non-ranking snooker tournament that took place from 18 to 20 December 2024 at the Global Theatre in Riyadh, Saudi Arabia. Organised by the World Snooker Tour, the tournament was part of the Riyadh Season festival in the city's entertainment district, Boulevard City. The event was broadcast worldwide by DAZN as well as other local broadcasters. The winner received £250,000 from a total prize fund of £785,000.

The event comprised 12 players: the top ten players in the snooker world rankings and two local wildcard players, Abdulraouf Saigh and Ahmed Aseeri. It featured a non-standard 20-point gold ball, the "Riyadh Season ball", that could be potted only after a player had completed a maximum break. The first player to pot the gold ball and extend a 147 break to 167 would win a special prize of USD$1,000,000.

Ronnie O'Sullivan was the defending champion, having defeated Luca Brecel 5‍–‍2 in the previous final, but he lost 2–4 to Mark Allen in the semi‑finals. Allen went on to win the tournament, defeating Brecel 5‍–‍1 in the final. No player achieved the 167 break; Zhang Anda came closest in his first-round match when he potted 12 reds with 12 blacks. The tournament produced 14 century breaks, the highest being a 143 by Ding Junhui in the second round.

== Overview ==
The event took place from 18 to 20 December in the entertainment district Boulevard City within Riyadh, Saudi Arabia. The event was first held as the 2024 World Masters of Snooker in March 2024 (as part of the preceding 2023–24 season) as the first professional snooker event ever held in Saudi Arabia.

=== Format ===
Colour	Value
Red	1 point
Yellow	2 points
Green	3 points
Brown	4 points
Blue	5 points
Pink	6 points
Black	7 points
Riyadh Season ball	20 points

All matches were played as the best of seven frames except the final, which was played as the best of nine frames. The matches were played under regular snooker rules, but the event used a gold ball worth 20 points, called the "Riyadh Season ball". The gold ball was placed on the centre of the baulk cushion, in line with the brown, blue, pink, and black balls. It could only be potted after a player had completed a maximum break of 147, to extend the break to 167. Fouling the gold ball would award 4 penalty points to the opponent. The gold ball stayed on the table as long as it was possible for either player to complete a maximum break, then it was removed from the table until the next frame.

=== Participants ===
The event featured twelve players, including the top ten players on the snooker world rankings, with the defending champion Ronnie O'Sullivan seeded first, the reigning World Champion Kyren Wilson seeded second, and the rest based on their rankings. It also featured two local wildcard players, Abdulraouf Saigh and Ahmed Aseeri from Saudi Arabia, who qualified by winning a local qualifying tournament.

=== Broadcasters ===
The tournament was broadcast worldwide by DAZN. It was also broadcast by the CBSA‑WPBSA Academy WeChat Channel, the CBSA‑WPBSA Academy Douyin and Huya Live in China; by Now TV in Hong Kong; by Astro SuperSport in Malaysia; by True Sports in Thailand; by TAP in the Philippines; by Sportcast in Taiwan; and by Sportstars and Vision+ in Indonesia.

=== Prize money ===
The event featured a total prize pool of £785,000. An additional prize of $1,000,000 (about £787,000) would be given to the first player to compile a 167 break. The breakdown of prize money for the event is shown below:

- Winner: £250,000
- Runner-up: £125,000
- Semi-finals: £75,000
- Quarter-finals: £50,000
- Round 2: £25,000
- Round 1: £5,000
- 167 break: $1,000,000 (about £787,000) for first made
- Total: £785,000

== Tournament draw ==
Numbers in parentheses after the players' names denote the players' seedings, and players in bold denote match winners. All matches were played as the best of seven frames except the final, which was played as the best of nine frames.

**Round 1** Best of 7 frames
**Ding Junhui (CHN) (9)**	**4**
Abdulraouf Saigh (KSA)	0
**Zhang Anda (CHN) (10)**	**4**
Ahmed Aseeri (KSA)	0

**Round 2** Best of 7 frames
Shaun Murphy (ENG) (8)	0
**Ding Junhui (CHN) (9)**	**4**
**Luca Brecel (BEL) (7)**	**4**
Zhang Anda (CHN) (10)	0

**Quarter-finals**; Best of 7 frames
**Ronnie O'Sullivan (ENG) (1)**	**4**
Ding Junhui (CHN) (9)	0
Mark Selby (ENG) (4)	2
**Mark Allen (NIR) (5)**	**4**
Judd Trump (ENG) (3)	3
**Mark Williams (WAL) (6)**	**4**
Kyren Wilson (ENG) (2)	3
**Luca Brecel (BEL) (7)**	**4**

**Semi-finals**; Best of 7 frames
Ronnie O'Sullivan (ENG) (1)	2
**Mark Allen (NIR) (5)**	**4**
Mark Williams (WAL) (6)	2
**Luca Brecel (BEL) (7)**	**4**

**Final**; Best of 9 frames
**Mark Allen (NIR) (5)**	**5**
Luca Brecel (BEL) (7)	1

=== Final ===
Final
Final: Best of 9 frames. Referee: Kevin Dabrowski; Global Theatre, Boulevard City, Riyadh, Saudi Arabia, 20 December 2024
**Mark Allen** (5); Northern Ireland	**5**–1	Luca Brecel (7); Belgium
Frame scores: 30‍–‍**67**, **104**‍–‍49 (104), **80**‍–‍1, **129**‍–‍5 (109), **82**‍–‍43, **63**‍–‍36
(frame 4) **109**	Highest break	43 (frame 5) (Note: The WST match centre confirms a high break of 43 for Luca Brecel. The WST news article about the final confirms that the break was made in frame 5.)
**2**	Century breaks	0

== Century breaks ==
A total of 14 century breaks were made in the tournament.

- 143, 122, 108 – Ding Junhui
- 134, 109, 104 – Mark Allen
- 134 – Zhang Anda
- 129, 113 – Ronnie O'Sullivan
- 120, 100 – Luca Brecel
- 107 – Judd Trump
- 103, 101 – Mark Williams
