= Harvey Chandler =

English snooker player

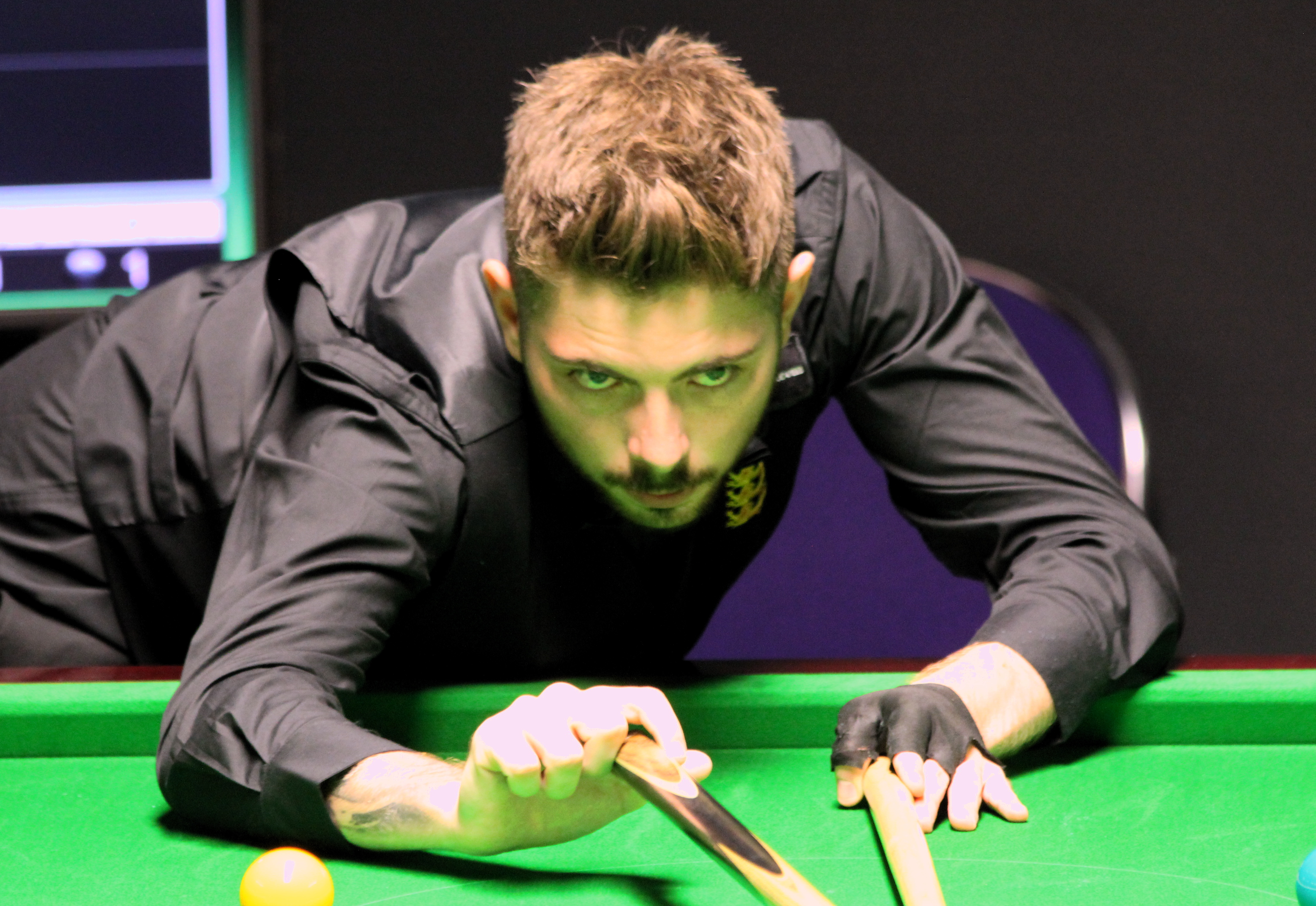
- Chandler at the 2017 Paul Hunter Classic

Personal information
- Born: 19 April 1995 (age 31) Northamptonshire, England

Sport
- Country: England
- Sport: Snooker
- Professional: 2018–2020
- Highest ranking: 82 (October 2019)
- Best ranking finish: Last 16 (2018 Paul Hunter Classic)

Harvey Chandler (born 19 April 1995) is an English former professional snooker player from Northamptonshire.

== Early and personal life ==
He is from Raunds in North Northamptonshire. He started playing snooker at the age of 13 years-old. His father would snooker clubs with him. Chandler was coached as a teenager in Northampton by Malcolm Yax. He is 6’ 4 and a keen football fan, and supports Manchester United. He played as a goalkeeper in the youth teams at Rushden and Diamonds and Walsall before quitting at the age of 15 years-old to focus on snooker despite being offered a new contract. He has a brother who played rugby for Kettering.

== Career ==
In August 2017, he came through three rounds of qualifying to play the main draw at the 2017 Paul Hunter Classic. He defeated Li Yuan to reach the round of 64.

In February 2018, Chandler won the EBSA European Snooker Championship in Bulgaria with a 7–2 victory over Jordan Brown. With this win, Chandler was granted a tour card for the 2018–19 professional snooker season.

In June 2020, he secured a place in the Group Winners’ phase of the Championship League by topping his round-robin group with a 2-2 with Joe Perry, and then beating Mark King 3-1 to set up a decisive final match with Sam Baird in which he also won 3-1.

In October 2022, he defeated Stan Moody, Jamie Curtis-Barrett and Josh Thomond on his way to the final of the WPBSA Q Tour event in Mons, Belgium before being edged out in the final by Farakh Ajaib.

In June 2023, he was defeated by compatriot Wayne Brown 5-3 in the final of the 2023 EBSA European 6-Red Snooker Championship, held in Bulgaria.

In June 2024, he earned credible 2-2 draws as a top-up player in the 2024 Championship League against Joe O'Connor and Aaron Hill. In September 2024, he reached the final of the second event of the 2024/25 WPBSA Q Tour Europe in Sofia, Bulgaria, losing 4-3 in the final to Dylan Emery. In March 2025, he reached the semi-final of the EBSA European Snooker Championship where he lost to young Polish player Michał Szubarczyk. In May 2026, he entered Q School, where he was defeated by fellow former professional Stuart Carrington.

== Performance and rankings timeline ==
Tournament	2012/ 13	2017/ 18	2018/ 19	2019/ 20	2022/ 23	2024/ 25
Ranking (Note: It shows the ranking at the beginning of the season)	(Note: He was an amateur)		(Note: New players on the Main Tour don't have a ranking)	87		
Ranking tournaments
Championship League	Non-Ranking Event				RR	RR
English Open	NH	A	1R	1R	A	A
Northern Ireland Open	NH	A	1R	3R	A	A
International Championship	A	A	LQ	LQ	NH	A
UK Championship	A	A	1R	1R	A	LQ
Shoot Out	NR	A	1R	1R	A	A
Scottish Open	MR	A	1R	1R	A	A
German Masters	A	A	LQ	LQ	A	A
Welsh Open	A	A	1R	1R	A	A
World Open	A	A	2R	1R	NH	A
World Grand Prix	NH	DNQ	DNQ	DNQ	DNQ	DNQ
Players Championship	DNQ	DNQ	DNQ	DNQ	DNQ	DNQ
Tour Championship	Not Held		DNQ	DNQ	DNQ	DNQ
World Championship	A	LQ	LQ	LQ	A	A
Non-ranking tournaments
Championship League	A	A	A	2R	A	A
Former ranking tournaments
Paul Hunter Classic	MR	2R	4R	NR	Not Held	
Indian Open	NH	A	LQ	Not Held		
China Open	A	A	LQ	Not Held		
Riga Masters	NH	A	LQ	WD	Not Held	
China Championship	NH	A	LQ	1R	Not Held	
Gibraltar Open	NH	LQ	1R	3R	Not Held	
European Masters	NH	A	LQ	LQ	A	NH

Performance Table Legend
LQ	lost in the qualifying draw	#R	lost in the early rounds of the tournament (WR = Wildcard round, RR = Round robin)	QF	lost in the quarter-finals
SF	lost in the semi-finals	F	lost in the final	W	won the tournament
DNQ	did not qualify for the tournament	A	did not participate in the tournament	WD	withdrew from the tournament

NH / Not Held	means an event was not held.
NR / Non-Ranking Event	means an event is/was no longer a ranking event.
R / Ranking Event	means an event is/was a ranking event.
MR / Minor-Ranking Event	means an event is/was a minor-ranking event.

== Career finals ==
=== Pro-am finals: 1 ===
Outcome	No.	Year	Championship	Opponent in the final	Score
Runner-up	1.	2018	Pink Ribbon	(England) Andrew Norman	2–4

=== Amateur finals: 3 (1 title) ===
Outcome	No.	Year	Championship	Opponent in the final	Score
Winner	1.	2018	EBSA European Snooker Championship	(Northern Ireland) Jordan Brown	7–2
Runner-up	1.	2022	Q Tour – Event 3	(Pakistan) Farakh Ajaib	3–5
Winner	1.	2023	Italian Snooker Masters	(England) Sean Maddocks	4–2
Runner-up	1.	2024	Q Tour – Event 2	(Wales) Dylan Emery	3–4
