= Dylan Emery =

Welsh snooker player

Personal information
- Born: 31 March 2001 (age 25)

Sport
- Country: Wales
- Sport: Snooker
- Professional: 2022–2024, 2025–present
- Highest ranking: 66 (December 2023)
- Current ranking: 70 (as of 7 November 2026)
- Best ranking finish: Last 8 (2026 Championship League)

Dylan Emery (born 31 March 2001) is a Welsh professional snooker player.

== Career ==
The winner of the 2021 EBSA European Under-21 Snooker Championships, he defeated Julien Leclercq in the final, 5–2. As a result of this win, he earned a place on the professional World Snooker Tour from the 2022–23 snooker season.

Emery also won the delayed 2020 Welsh Amateur Championship, defeating Paul Davies 8–6. Called up as a last-minute replacement for the 2022 Turkish Masters, Emery defeated Alfie Burden 5–0 to qualify for the event. He then met John Higgins, who beat him 5–2, with Higgins suggesting he would do well on the tour the following season.

== Performance and rankings timeline ==
Tournament	2017/ 18	2018/ 19	2019/ 20	2020/ 21	2021/ 22	2022/ 23	2023/ 24	2024/ 25	2025/ 26	2026/ 27
Ranking (Note: It shows the ranking at the beginning of the season)	(Note: He was an amateur)					(Note: New players on the Main Tour don't have a ranking)	74			72
Ranking tournaments
Championship League	Non-Ranking Event			A	RR	RR	RR	RR	2R	3R
China Open	A	A	Tournament Not Held							LQ
Wuhan Open	Tournament Not Held						LQ	1R	1R	1R
British Open	Tournament Not Held				2R	1R	LQ	LQ	LQ	LQ
English Open	A	A	A	A	A	1R	2R	LQ	1R	LQ
Shenzhen Open (Note: The event was called the Xi'an Grand Prix (2024/2025–2025/2026))	Tournament Not Held							1R	1R	LQ
Northern Ireland Open	A	A	A	A	LQ	1R	2R	LQ	1R	LQ
International Championship	A	A	A	Not Held			2R	1R	LQ	1R
UK Championship	A	A	A	A	A	LQ	LQ	LQ	LQ	
Shoot Out	A	A	A	2R	1R	3R	3R	3R	1R	
Scottish Open	A	A	A	A	A	1R	LQ	LQ	LQ	
German Masters	A	A	A	A	A	LQ	LQ	2R	LQ	LQ
Welsh Open	A	A	A	2R	LQ	LQ	2R	1R	2R	
World Grand Prix	DNQ	DNQ	DNQ	DNQ	DNQ	DNQ	DNQ	DNQ	DNQ	
Players Championship	DNQ	DNQ	DNQ	DNQ	DNQ	DNQ	DNQ	DNQ	DNQ	
World Open	A	A	A	Not Held			LQ	LQ	LQ	
Tour Championship	NH	DNQ	DNQ	DNQ	DNQ	DNQ	DNQ	DNQ	DNQ	
World Championship	A	LQ	LQ	LQ	LQ	LQ	LQ	LQ	LQ	
Former ranking tournaments
Paul Hunter Classic	A	1R	NR	Tournament Not Held						
WST Pro Series	Not Held			RR	Tournament Not Held					
Turkish Masters	Tournament Not Held				1R	Tournament Not Held				
Gibraltar Open	LQ	A	A	2R	A	Tournament Not Held				
WST Classic	Tournament Not Held					1R	Tournament Not Held			
European Masters	A	A	A	A	A	1R	1R	Not Held		
Saudi Arabia Masters	Tournament Not Held							1R	2R	NH
Former non-ranking tournaments
Six-red World Championship	A	A	A	Not Held		LQ	Tournament Not Held			

Performance Table Legend
LQ	lost in the qualifying draw	#R	lost in the early rounds of the tournament (WR = Wildcard round, RR = Round robin)	QF	lost in the quarter-finals
SF	lost in the semi-finals	F	lost in the final	W	won the tournament
DNQ	did not qualify for the tournament	A	did not participate in the tournament	WD	withdrew from the tournament

NH / Not Held	means an event was not held.
NR / Non-Ranking Event	means an event is/was no longer a ranking event.
R / Ranking Event	means an event is/was a ranking event.
MR / Minor-Ranking Event	means an event is/was a minor-ranking event.

== Career finals ==
=== Amateur finals: 8 (5 titles) ===
Outcome	No.	Year	Championship	Opponent in the final	Score
Winner	1.	2017	World Open Under-16 Snooker Championships	(Russia) Mikhail Terekhov	4–1
Runner-up	1.	2018	Challenge Tour - Event 4	(England) Mitchell Mann	0–3
Runner-up	2.	2019	EBSA European Under-18 Snooker Championships	(Republic of Ireland) Aaron Hill	3–4
Winner	2.	2019	Welsh Under-21 Championship	(Wales) Liam Davies	3–0
Winner	3.	2021	Welsh Amateur Championship	(Wales) Paul Davies	8–6
Winner	4.	2021	EBSA European Under-21 Snooker Championships	(Belgium) Julien Leclercq	5–2
Winner	5.	2024	2024–25 Q Tour Event 2	(England) Harvey Chandler	4–3
Runner-up	3.	2025	2024–25 Q Tour Event 7	(England) Liam Highfield	3–4
