= 2024 World Masters of Snooker =

2024 Riyadh Season World Masters of Snooker

Tournament information
- Dates: 4–6 March 2024
- Venue: Global Theatre
- City: Boulevard City, Riyadh
- Country: Saudi Arabia
- Organisation: World Snooker Tour
- Format: Non-ranking event
- Total prize fund: £785,000
- Winner's share: £250,000
- Highest break: Ding Junhui (CHN) (138)

Final
- Champion: Ronnie O'Sullivan (ENG)
- Runner-up: Luca Brecel (BEL)
- Score: 5‍–‍2

The 2024 World Masters of Snooker (officially the 2024 Riyadh Season World Masters of Snooker) was a professional non-ranking snooker tournament that took place from 4 to 6 March 2024 at the Global Theatre in Riyadh, Saudi Arabia. Organised by the World Snooker Tour and part of the Riyadh Season festival in the entertainment district Boulevard City within Riyadh, the event was the first professional snooker tournament held in Saudi Arabia, and the inaugural staging of the World Masters of Snooker. It introduced a new 20-point gold ball called the "Riyadh Season ball", which could only be potted after a player had completed a maximum break of 147 to extend the break to 167. The event was broadcast locally in the Middle East and North Africa and worldwide. The winner received £250,000 from a total prize fund of £785,000.

The event featured 12 players, including the top ten players on the snooker world rankings, with the reigning World Champion, Luca Brecel, as the top seed, as well as two local wildcard players, Ali Alobaidli from Qatar and Omar Alajlani from Saudi Arabia.

World number one player Ronnie O'Sullivan won the event, defeating Brecel 5‍–‍2 in the final, capturing his fifth professional title of the 2023‍–‍24 season.

The tournament produced 16 century breaks. O'Sullivan made six, the most of any player. The highest break was a 138 made by Ding Junhui. No player successfully compiled a maximum break for a chance to pot the new "Riyadh Season" gold ball. John Higgins made an attempt in his second-round match against Mark Williams, potting all 15 reds with blacks, but lost position and missed the yellow to end the break at 120. Higgins was defeated in the quarter-finals by eventual winner O'Sullivan 0‍–‍4. Despite the match starting at 1:48 am local time, O'Sullivan made breaks of 135, 129, 102, and 82 to complete the whitewash, with Higgins having not potted a single ball in the whole match. In another quarter-final match, Mark Allen recovered from 0‍–‍2 and 1‍–‍3 behind to beat Mark Selby 4‍–‍3, winning the deciding frame on the last black.

== Overview ==
In December 2019, World Snooker Tour (WST) announced a 10-year deal with Saudi Arabia, including ranking tournaments that will be hosted in the country. However, no snooker tournaments were held in Saudi Arabia in the next four years due to the COVID-19 pandemic. In January 2024, WST announced a new non-ranking tournament called the World Masters of Snooker, to take place from 4 to 6 March 2024 at the Boulevard Arena in Riyadh, Saudi Arabia. It was the first professional snooker tournament to be held in Saudi Arabia.

=== Format ===
| Colour | Value |
|---|---|
| Red | 1 point |
| Yellow | 2 points |
| Green | 3 points |
| Brown | 4 points |
| Blue | 5 points |
| Pink | 6 points |
| Black | 7 points |
| Riyadh Season ball | 20 points |

All matches were played as the best of seven frames except the final, which was played as the best of nine frames.

The matches were played under regular snooker rules, but the event introduced a new gold ball worth 20 points, called the "Riyadh Season ball". The gold ball was placed on the centre of the baulk cushion, in line with the brown, blue, pink, and black balls. It could only be potted after a player had completed a maximum break of 147, to extend the break to 167. It would be a four-point foul if the gold ball were potted earlier in the frame, or hit before the object ball. The gold ball stayed on the table as long as it was possible for either player to complete a maximum break, then it was removed from the table until the next frame.

=== Participants ===
The event was originally planned to feature ten players, including the top eight players on the snooker world rankings, with the reigning World Champion, Luca Brecel, seeded first, and the rest based on their rankings. It also features two local wildcard players, Ali Alobaidli from Qatar and Omar Alajlani from Saudi Arabia. On 29 February, WST announced that the tournament was expanded to 12 players, with the addition of world numbers nine and ten, Ding Junhui and John Higgins.

=== Broadcasters ===
The tournament was broadcast locally with Arabic commentary across the Middle East and North Africa by MBC Action, MBC Egypt, Saudi Sport, webook, and Shahid. It was also broadcast by Eurosport and Discovery+ in Europe (including the United Kingdom and Ireland); by Migu and Huya in mainland China; Now TV in Hong Kong; Astro SuperSport in Malaysia; TrueVisions in Thailand; Sportcast in Taiwan; Premier Sports Network in the Philippines; Sportstars and Vision+ in Indonesia; Skynet in Myanmar; Hang Meas in Cambodia; and DAZN in all other territories.

=== Prize money ===
The event featured a total prize pool of £785,000. An additional prize of $500,000 (about £395,000) would have been given to the first player to compile a 167 break. However, no player was able to do so and the prize was not collected. The breakdown of prize money for the event is shown below:

- Winner: £250,000
- Runner-up: £125,000
- Semi-finals: £75,000
- Quarter-finals: £50,000
- Round 2: £25,000
- Round 1: £5,000
- 167 break: $500,000 (about £395,000) for first made
- Total: £785,000

== Tournament draw ==
Numbers in parentheses after the players' names denote the players' seedings, and players in bold denote match winners. All matches were played as the best of seven frames except the final, which was played as the best of nine frames.

**Round 1** Best of 7 frames
**Ding Junhui (CHN) (9)** | **4**
Omar Alajlani (SAU) | 0
**John Higgins (SCO) (10)** | **4**
Ali Alobaidli (QAT) | 0

**Round 2** Best of 7 frames
**Ali Carter (ENG) (8)** | **4**
Ding Junhui (CHN) (9) | 3
Mark Williams (WAL) (7) | 2
**John Higgins (SCO) (10)** | **4**

**Quarter-finals**; Best of 7 frames
**Luca Brecel (BEL) (1)** | **4**
Ali Carter (ENG) (8) | 1
**Mark Allen (NIR) (4)** | **4**
Mark Selby (ENG) (5) | 3
**Judd Trump (ENG) (3)** | **4**
Shaun Murphy (ENG) (6) | 3
**Ronnie O'Sullivan (ENG) (2)** | **4**
John Higgins (SCO) (10) | 0

**Semi-finals**; Best of 7 frames
**(Belgium) Luca Brecel (1)** | **4**
(Northern Ireland) Mark Allen (4) | 2
(England) Judd Trump (3) | 1
**(England) Ronnie O'Sullivan (2)** | **4**

**Final**; Best of 9 frames
(Belgium) Luca Brecel (1) | 2
**(England) Ronnie O'Sullivan (2)** | **5**

=== Final ===
Final
Final: Best of 9 frames. Referee: Tatiana Woollaston; Global Theatre, Boulevard City, Riyadh, Saudi Arabia, 6 March 2024.
| Luca Brecel (1); Belgium | 2–**5** | **Ronnie O'Sullivan** (2); England |
Frame scores: 3–**118**, **107**–9, **81**–0, 29–**94**, 0–**121** (121), 0–**69**, 0–**131** (124)
| (frame 3) 81 | Highest break | **124** (frame 7) |
| 0 | Century breaks | **2** |

== Controversies ==
Promotional poster for the event featuring the "Riyadh Season" gold ball

The announcement of the event, hailed as a "huge breakthrough" by WST chairman, Steve Dawson, was met with criticism accusing Saudi Arabia of sportswashing. Amnesty International criticised snooker's involvement in Saudi Arabia, amid its human rights abuses. Peter Frankental, Amnesty International UK's Economic Affairs director, said: "It was just a matter of time before Saudi Arabia's huge sportswashing machine sucked in snooker along with almost every other major world sport. If the likes of Ronnie O'Sullivan and Judd Trump play in Riyadh, they shouldn't hesitate to speak out about human rights." Some players have also criticised WST of overly focusing on events featuring the top players. Amateur player Steven Hallworth tweeted: "Was starting to lose sleep with worry that the top eight players might run out of events and cash soon, thank God for this."

The introduction of the 20-point gold ball was criticised by The Independent journalist Luke Baker, who called it a "ludicrous gimmick" and "the sign of a desperate sport". The Daily Telegraph chief sports writer Oliver Brown described the Saudi invention as "warping the very rules of the game for its own hubristic ends", calling it "frivolous, tasteless, wretched".

Former World Champion Shaun Murphy, however, defended the event and the gold ball, saying: "the new promoters in Saudi will want their event to stand out and be different. At the end of the day you'd rather have the event than not." Murphy added: "if we (WST) only traded with countries with perfect human rights records, it would be a very, very small pool to pick from... We wouldn't be trading with the UK either."

== Century breaks ==
A total of 16 century breaks were made in the tournament.

- 138, 120 – Ding Junhui
- 135, 129, 124, 123, 121, 102 – Ronnie O'Sullivan
- 133, 121 – Mark Allen
- 126, 121 – Shaun Murphy
- 125 – Luca Brecel
- 122 – Mark Williams
- 120, 117 – John Higgins
