= Professional snooker career of Ronnie O'Sullivan =

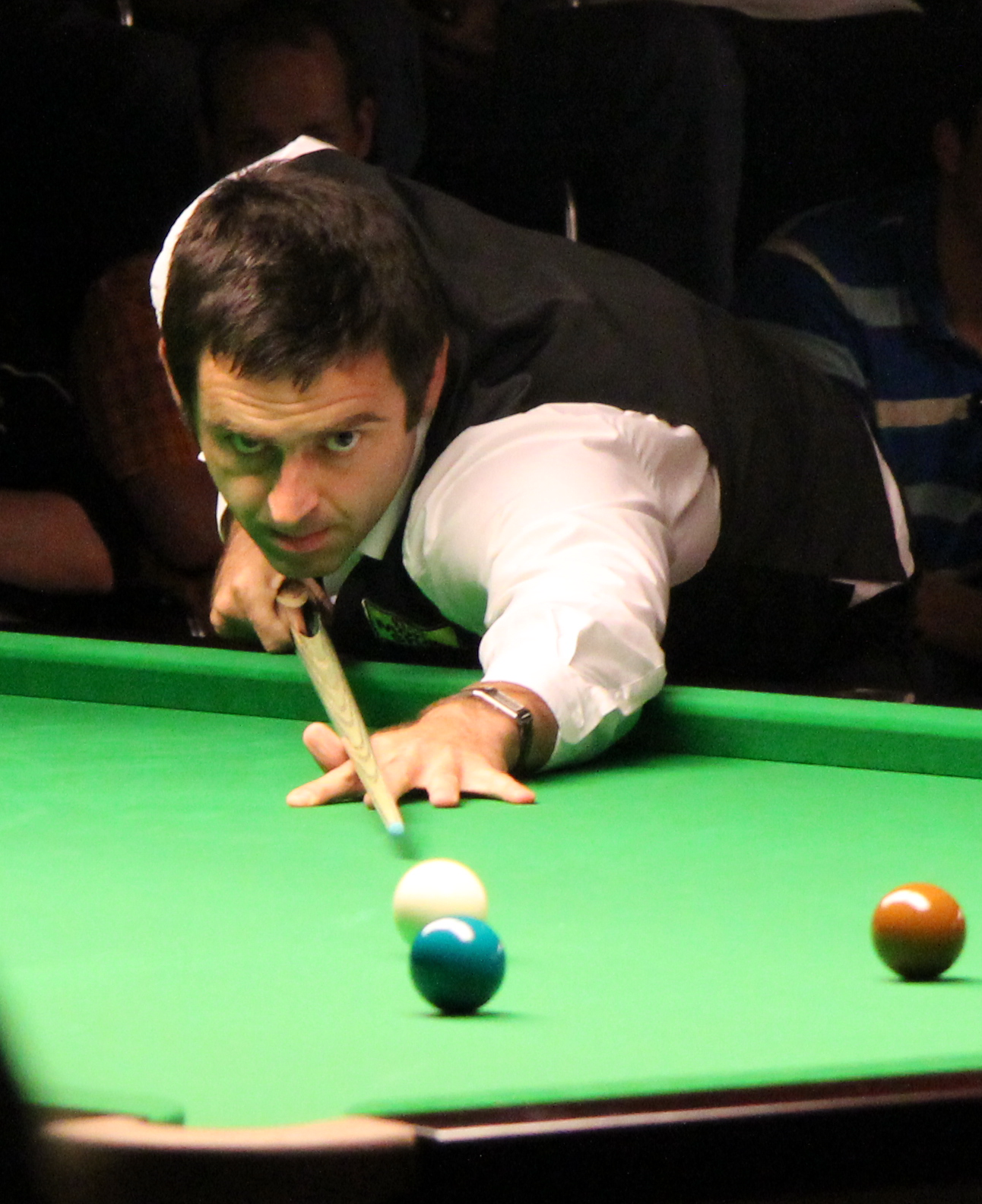
Ronnie O'Sullivan playing snooker in 2011

Ronnie O'Sullivan started his professional snooker career in 1992 and is widely considered one of the greatest players in the history of the sport. His play and accomplishments are described by some peers and pundits as being the greatest in the modern era of snooker. O'Sullivan is a seven-time world champion, and holds many records, including the fastest maximum break in professional competition; the highest number of century breaks; the highest number of maximum breaks, and the most Triple Crown event titles (23).

== Career ==
=== Amateur career: early achievements ===
O'Sullivan started playing snooker from just seven years old, and showed a considerable natural talent for the game: winning his first club tournament aged 9 and scoring his first century break (a run of 117) aged 10. O'Sullivan's first major success was becoming the 1989 British Under-16 Champion, aged 13, beating Andy Hicks 3–1 in the final. A year later, O'Sullivan made a "big breakthrough" at a professional-amateur tournament in Stevenage. He defeated world number 34 Marcel Gauvreau 3–2 in the quarter-finals, with a break of 120 in the deciding frame before progressing to the final and defeating fellow amateur Anthony Hamilton for the title. Afterwards, Gauvreau described O'Sullivan's play as "unbelievable" and that "No-one's ever played that well against me." Still aged 14, O'Sullivan made his television debut at the Thames Snooker Classic. He made a televised 75 break during his quarter-final match, which was commentated on by Steve Davis, before being defeated at the semi-final stage. Two years later, O'Sullivan reached the final of the 1991 English Amateur Championship, where he fell 10–13 to Steve Judd. During the tournament, at the age of 15 years and 98 days, he became the youngest player to compile a maximum break in a recognised tournament, a record that stood until July 2017 when it was broken by Sean Maddocks from Liverpool, who was 15 years and 90 days old when he achieved the feat. Later the same year, he defeated Patrick Delsemme 11–4 for the 1991 IBSF World Under-21 Snooker Championship title, captured the 1991 Junior Pot Black by beating Declan Murphy 2–0 in the final, and won Pontins Autumn Championship, whitewashing Matthew Stevens 5–0. O'Sullivan's last notable amateur achievement before turning professional was reaching the southern area final of the 1992 English Amateur Championship, where he lost to Stephen Lee.

=== 1992/1993 season: qualifying success, first professional title, Crucible debut ===
O'Sullivan won a record 38 consecutive matches after turning professional all in ranking events and surpassing the previous record of Stephen Hendry in his debut season, and he won 74 of his 76 qualifying matches. All qualifying matches were played in a block from June to September 1992 in the Norbreck Castle in Blackpool. The final stages for all the events came later in the season. He also set a record for the fastest victory, winning a best-of-9-frame match in 43 minutes to beat Tony Drago's previous record. After this performance, MC Alan Hughes first gave him the nickname "The Rocket". O'Sullivan also won his first title as a professional: the non-ranking Extra Challenge in Bangkok, triumphing over John Parrott, James Wattana and Alan McManus in the round-robin format. O'Sullivan qualified for the World Championship and made his debut at the Crucible Theatre on 18 April 1993, at the age of 17 years and 134 days and he is still the fourth-youngest player ever to compete at the venue, behind Luca Brecel, Yan Bingtao and Stephen Hendry. He lost 7–10 to Alan McManus in the first round. O'Sullivan was named the World Professional Billiards and Snooker Association's (WPBSA) Young Player of the Year for 1993.

=== 1993/1994 season: historic UK Championship and British Open titles, Masters debut ===
In the 1993–94 season, O'Sullivan enjoyed more success by first qualifying for the Masters as a wild card by winning the 1993 Benson and Hedges Snooker Championship by defeating John Lardner 9–6 in the final. Then O'Sullivan captured his first professional ranking title and first part of the Triple Crown, the UK Championship by defeating Stephen Hendry 10–6 in the final. At the age of 17 years and 358 days he became the youngest ever winner of a ranking tournament. One month later, in the European Open final, he came across Stephen Hendry again but this time, he was defeated by 5–9. Making his debut at the Masters, he lost in the first round 1–5 to Dennis Taylor, who was the Masters champion in 1987, by defeating Alex Higgins 9–8 in the final. He won his second ranking title of the season at the British Open by defeating James Wattana 9–4 in the final. He reached the second round of the World Championship, but lost 3–13 against John Parrott. Having started the season ranked number 57 in the world, he ended it ranked number 9, and was named the WPBSA's Player of the Year for 1994.

=== 1994/1995 season: Masters title, two ranking event finals ===
O'Sullivan did not win any ranking titles during the 1994–95 season, but reached two finals. He lost to James Wattana in the final of the Thailand Open and to John Higgins in the final of the British Open. At the Masters, O'Sullivan captured his first title by defeating Higgins 9–3 in the final. With this victory, he became the youngest player ever to win the tournament at the age of 19 years and 69 days. and came a step closer to collecting all the Triple Crown events, only requiring a world title to complete his collection. At the World Championship, he recorded his furthest run yet by reaching the quarter-finals, where he lost 8–13 to Stephen Hendry.

=== 1995/1996 season: Masters runner-up, controversy at the Crucible ===
In the 1995–96 season, O'Sullivan again did not capture any ranking titles but was victorious at the non-ranking Charity Challenge defeating John Higgins 9–6 in the final. As defending champion, O'Sullivan reached the final of the Masters, but lost his title 5–10 to Stephen Hendry. For the first time, O'Sullivan reached the World Championship semi-finals, but lost 14–16 to Peter Ebdon. After his 10–3 first round victory over Alain Robidoux, Robidoux accused O'Sullivan of showing "disrespect" after he had played left-handed during the match. Robidoux refused to shake hands with O'Sullivan at the end of the match. O'Sullivan responded by saying that he was "better left-handed than [Robidoux] is right-handed." Later during the tournament, before his quarter-final match with John Higgins, O'Sullivan was involved in an incident with assistant press officer, Michael Ganley, in the press room. O'Sullivan admitted to assaulting Ganley during the incident. For this snooker's governing body, the WPBSA, gave O'Sullivan a two-year suspended ban and a £20,000 fine, and advised him to donate £10,000 to charity, but allowed him to continue competing at the event.

=== 1996/1997 season: Masters runner-up, Asian Classic and German Open titles, fastest ever maximum break ===
In the 1996–97 season, O'Sullivan won two ranking titles: the Asian Classic by narrowly defeating Brian Morgan 9–8 in the final, and the German Open by defeating Alain Robidoux 9–7 in the final. O'Sullivan again reached the final of the Charity Challenge, where he faced Stephen Hendry in a first-to-nine frame match. O'Sullivan trailed 2–8 before winning six frames in a row to level at 8–8, before Hendry won the deciding frame with a maximum break. At the Masters, O'Sullivan reached his third consecutive final, where he faced Steve Davis. After O'Sullivan took the first two frames with back-to-back century breaks of 116 and 113, the third frame was disrupted by a streaker, Lianne Croft. Davis later stated that the streaking incident affected O'Sullivan's concentration, allowing him back into the match and the afternoon session ended all-square at 4–4. O'Sullivan began the evening session by winning four frames in 49 minutes to take an 8–4 lead, but Davis fought back to win the next six frames and clinch the title with a 10–8 victory. On 21 April 1997, while playing Mick Price in the first round of the World Championship, O'Sullivan made the fastest ever competitive maximum break in just over five minutes—averaging under nine seconds per shot. This was also O'Sullivan's first maximum break in professional competition. He exited the World Championship in the second round, losing 12–13 against Darren Morgan. O'Sullivan also won the non-ranking European League, defeating Hendry 10–8 in the final.

=== 1997/1998 season: UK Championship and Scottish Open titles ===
O'Sullivan captured two more ranking titles in the 1997–98 season. By beating three-time defending champion Stephen Hendry 10–6 in the final, O'Sullivan won his second UK Championship title. O'Sullivan also triumphed at the Scottish Open by defeating John Higgins 9–5 in the final. For the third year in a row, O'Sullivan made the final of the Charity Challenge. He was defeated, like the year previous, in a final frame decider, 8–9 to John Higgins. For the first time in three years O'Sullivan did not reach the final at the Masters, losing to Steve Davis. After defeating Ken Doherty 9–3 in the final of the Irish Masters, a post-match drug test found traces of cannabis in his system. O'Sullivan was stripped of the title, forfeited the prize money and the title was awarded to Doherty by the WPBSA. O'Sullivan reached the World Championship semi-finals for the second time in his career, but lost 9–17 to eventual champion John Higgins.

=== 1998/1999 season: no major or ranking success ===
O'Sullivan began the 1998–99 season by winning the non-ranking Scottish Masters, but went on to win no more titles during the season. At the UK Championship, O'Sullivan was defending champion, but withdrew from the tournament shortly before his scheduled first-round match. His manager stated that he was "suffering from physical and nervous exhaustion" and that his doctor had ordered "a complete rest from snooker". Later reports stated instead that he was suffering from depression at the time. In the quarter-finals of the Welsh Open, O'Sullivan made the second maximum of his professional career, playing against James Wattana. O'Sullivan reached the quarter-finals of the Masters, but lost 2–6 to Ken Doherty. In his fourth consecutive final in the Charity Challenge, and in a repeat outcome of last year's final: O'Sullivan lost to John Higgins again, this time 4–9. At the World Championship, O'Sullivan reached his third semi-final in four years. But, he was again denied a place in the final when he lost 13–17 to Stephen Hendry in a match that featured century breaks in four consecutive frames (two by O'Sullivan of 134 and 110, scoring 134 after missing the pink for the maximum break).

=== 1999/2000 season: China and Scottish Open titles ===
At the beginning of the 1999–2000 season, O'Sullivan reached the final of the one-off non-ranking Millennium Cup. However, he lost 2–7 to Stephen Lee. Throughout the rest of the season, O'Sullivan won two ranking tournaments: the China Open, where he defeated Lee 9–2 in the final, and the Scottish Open, where he defeated Mark Williams 9–1 in the final. At the Grand Prix and Scottish Open, O'Sullivan hit his third and fourth competitive maximum breaks of his career. Competing for England, O'Sullivan was part of the winning Nations Cup team. Partnering John Parrott, Jimmy White and Stephen Lee: they defeated defending champions Wales 6–4 in the final. In the Triple Crown events, O'Sullivan did not experience any winning success: losing at the quarter-final stages of both the UK Championship and Masters, 3–9 to Matthew Stevens and 3–6 to John Parrott respectively, and losing in the first round of the World Championship, 9–10 to David Gray despite becoming the first player to compile five century breaks in a first round match at the Crucible.

=== 2000/2001 season: World Championship title and China Open defence ===
The 2000–01 season was O'Sullivan's most successful to date: winning two ranking titles and four non-ranking titles. O'Sullivan started the season by reaching the final in three out of the first four tournaments: winning the Champions Cup by defeating Mark Williams 7–5 in the final after being 1–4 behind, coming runner-up to Williams 5–9 at the Grand Prix, and winning the Scottish Masters by defeating Stephen Hendry 9–6 in the final. He also recorded a quarter-final run at the British Open, losing 3–5 to Peter Ebdon. At the UK Championship: O'Sullivan defeated Jimmy Michie 9–2 in the last 32, Dave Harold 9–5 in the last 16, Quinten Hann 9–5 in the quarter-finals, before losing to Williams 4–9 in the semi-finals. O'Sullivan then successfully defended his China Open title, defeating Williams 9–3 in the final. He became the seventh player in snooker history to defend a world-ranking tournament.

In the new year, O'Sullivan failed to reach the quarter-final stages of a ranking event for the first time this season: losing 4–5 to Joe Swail in the last 16 of the Welsh Open. This began a run of poor form that saw O'Sullivan lose in the opening round of the Masters 2–6 to Jimmy White and then in the second round of the Thailand Masters 4–5 to Shokat Ali (losing the deciding frame on a re-spotted black). O'Sullivan returned to winning ways, by capturing the Irish Masters title by defeating Stephen Hendry 9–8 in the final, before he experienced another dip in form losing to Mark Davis in the opening round of the Scottish Open.

At the World Championship, O'Sullivan showed no signs of this fluctuating form. He defeated Andy Hicks 10–2 in first round, Dave Harold 13–6 in the second, Peter Ebdon 13–6 in the quarter-finals, and Joe Swail 17–11 in the semi-finals to reach his first final after 9 years as a professional. In the final, he faced John Higgins. O'Sullivan established an early lead in the 35-frame final which he never relinquished, and eventually triumphed 18–14 for his first world title (completing his collection of major titles). O'Sullivan dedicated the win to his father. O'Sullivan ended the season by winning the Premier League. After finishing second in the league stage, he defeated Higgins 6–3 in the semi-finals, and Stephen Hendry 9–7 in the final. He was ranked world number 2 by the end of the season.

=== 2001/2002 season: UK Championship title, semi-final Crucible clash with Hendry, rise to world number 1 ===
O'Sullivan began the 2001–02 season by trying to defend his Champions Cup and Scottish Masters titles. At the Champions Cup, he was eliminated in the group stages: defeating Jimmy White before losing to Ken Doherty and Peter Ebdon. At the Scottish Masters, he was defeated 6–9 by John Higgins in the final. O'Sullivan then reached the semi-finals of the British Open, losing to Graeme Dott 4–6. At the LG Cup, O'Sullivan compiled his fifth maximum break in competitive play in six minutes and 36 seconds on the way to a 5–1 defeat of Drew Henry in the last 16. This was the second fastest ever recorded behind his own at the 1997 World Championship. O'Sullivan then lost in the next round, falling 4–5 to Ebdon in the quarter-finals. O'Sullivan reached the quarter-finals of the European Open, before losing 4–5 to Stephen Hendry.

O'Sullivan started his UK Championship campaign by defeating Ali Carter 9–2 in the last 32. In the last 16, leading 8–0 after winning all the frames in the first session, his opponent David Finbow withdrew from the match due to an anxiety attack. O'Sullivan then progressed to the final, after defeating Ebdon 9–8 from 4–8 behind in the quarter-finals and Mark Williams 9–6 in the semi-finals. Playing Ken Doherty in the final, O'Sullivan was dominant, winning his third UK title 10–1. With the victory, he joined an "elite" group of Davis, Hendry, Parrott and Higgins to win the World Championship and the UK Championship in the same calendar year.

At the Welsh Open, O'Sullivan was defeated in a final frame decider 4–5 by Paul Hunter in the last 16. At the Masters, O'Sullivan overcame Joe Swail 6–3 in the first round, before narrowly losing to Jimmy White 5–6 in a "tense" quarter-final after being 5–2 ahead. O'Sullivan did not defend his China Open title, losing 3–5 to Mark Selby in the quarter-finals. In the match, he played a series of reckless shots and conceded two frames before snookers were even required. O'Sullivan reached the semi-finals of the Thailand Masters, before losing to Williams by 2–5. O'Sullivan then suffered two early defeats at the Irish Masters and the Scottish Open. At the Irish Masters, where he was defending champion, he lost in his opening match in the quarter-finals 2–6 to Matthew Stevens. At the Scottish Open, he again lost in his opening match, this time in the first round 3–5 to Barry Hawkins.

As the defending champion at the World Championship for the first time, O'Sullivan sought to turn his recent bad form around and break the Crucible curse. O'Sullivan defeated Drew Henry 10–5 in the first round, Robert Milkins 13–2 in the second round, and Stephen Lee 13–10 in the quarter-finals to advance to the semi-finals where he faced Stephen Hendry. In a pre-match interview, O'Sullivan revealed that he had "no respect" for Hendry, referring to an incident during O'Sullivan's 13–17 semi-final defeat by Hendry three years prior, when the referee had awarded a miss that O'Sullivan felt Hendry should not have accepted. He further added that he wanted "to send [Hendry] back home to Scotland" to stop one of his former manager's players from winning the tournament, and that "I know if I do get beat and [Hendry] comes up and does a moonie in front of me and goes 'Ne ne ne', I'll just look at him and say 'well done' and say 'go back to your sad little life'.". In the match O'Sullivan took a 5–3 overnight lead after the first session, but Hendry fought back to level at 12–12 before the final session. Hendry subsequently outplayed O'Sullivan winning the semi-final 17 frames to 13. After the match, Hendry said it wasn't "personal" for him and he didn't remember the incident O'Sullivan described. O'Sullivan was unapologetic about the comments he made, saying it made a "better atmosphere" and "what's better than a grudge match?".

O'Sullivan ended the season by defending his Premier League title. Having finished first after the league stage, O'Sullivan defeated Jimmy White 6–2 in the semi-final, and John Higgins 9–4 in the final. He began the 2002/2003 season ranked number 1.

=== 2002/2003 season: European Open and Irish Masters titles ===
O'Sullivan had another successful season in 2002/2003, reaching the last 16 in seven ranking tournaments. He began the season by winning the invitational Scottish Masters, defeating John Higgins 9–4 in the final. He reached the quarter-finals of the LG Cup, losing against eventual champion Chris Small; the last 16 of the British Open, losing against Paul Hunter, the quarter-finals of the UK Championship, losing against Drew Henry; and the quarter-finals of the Welsh Open, losing against Marco Fu. After this O'Sullivan won back-to-back ranking titles, defeating Hendry in the final of the European Open, and Higgins in the final of the Irish Masters. He reached the last 16 of the Scottish Open, before losing against Alan McManus. His only first-round ranking event defeat of the season came at the World Championship, when he lost 6–10 in the first round against the unseeded Marco Fu, despite making a maximum break in the match. This defeat saw him drop to number 3 in the rankings. He participated in the Premier League, but despite topping the table after the league stage, he lost 4–6 in the semi-final against Fu.

=== 2003/2004 season: second World Championship title and world number 1 ===
In the 2003–04 season, O'Sullivan reached three ranking-event finals. He reached the final of the British Open, but lost 6–9 against Stephen Hendry. He won the Welsh Open by defeating Steve Davis 9–8. He reached the final of the Masters, but lost 9–10 against Paul Hunter, despite having led 6–1 and then 9–7. His consistent form throughout the season earned him the £50,000 bonus for topping the LG Electronics Tour Order of Merit, a series of seven events – all the professional ranking tournaments in the campaign except for the World Championship. In 2004, O'Sullivan's father telephoned six-time World Champion Ray Reardon, and asked if he could give O'Sullivan some advice. With Reardon's help O'Sullivan recovered his form, and won the 2004 World Championship. He defeated Hendry 17–4 in the semi–finals, the most one-sided defeat ever in a World Championship semi–final. He then defeated Graeme Dott 18–8 in the final, despite losing the first five frames. O'Sullivan blamed his poor start on "mind games" by Dott's coach Derek Hill, who visited O'Sullivan's dressing room just before the match. O'Sullivan was ranked number one for the next two seasons. In late 2020, in a Eurosport special The Joy of Six, O'Sullivan told Colin Murray the interviewer that his poor start had been to do with being unsettled by seeing his past coach and friend Derek Hill in his opponent's corner. He had in fact been very angry at him felt it was a betrayal of sorts but his coach Ray Reardon was able to keep him focused enough to turn his game around and win.

=== 2004/2005 season: second Masters title ===
O'Sullivan began the 2004–05 season by winning the Grand Prix, defeating Ian McCulloch 9–5 in the final. He then reached the semi-finals of the British Open, losing 1–6 to Stephen Maguire, and the last 32 of the UK Championship, losing 6–9, once again against Maguire. In 2005, O'Sullivan defended his Welsh Open title, by defeating Stephen Hendry 9–8. During the tournament, O'Sullivan compiled ten century breaks, including a break of 146, the highest of the tournament. After this, he won his second Masters title, by defeating John Higgins 10–3. After the final, Higgins described O'Sullivan as a "total genius" because of ten breaks over 50 in the final including three centuries.

O'Sullivan then won his third Irish Masters title, by defeating Matthew Stevens 10–8. He then missed the China Open on medical grounds; for which he was criticised by Anthony Hamilton, who said that O'Sullivan had a duty to promote the sport overseas. In the World Championship, O'Sullivan lost to Peter Ebdon in the quarter-final. From 2–8 down, Ebdon began a comeback and eventually won 13–11, by playing in an exceptionally determined and dogged style, with many observers accusing him of deliberate slow play to disrupt O'Sullivan's fast game. After the match, O'Sullivan indicated to the press that he was unlikely to compete in the following season, and would perhaps even retire from the sport altogether. O'Sullivan participated in the Premier League. After finishing third in the table after the league stage, O'Sullivan defeated Hendry 5–0 in the semi-finals, and Williams 6–0 in the final. In September 2005, he announced that he would play a truncated 2005/2006 season, spending some time playing eight-ball pool in the United States, having been chosen to compete on the elite International Pool Tour.

=== 2005/2006 season: Masters runner-up, troubled season ===
O'Sullivan began the 2005–06 season at the Grand Prix, and reached the final, but lost 2–9 against John Higgins. In his last-32 match with Mark King at the UK Championship, O'Sullivan sat with a wet towel draped over his head for most of the contest, and lost 8–9. He then successfully defended his Premier League title. Having finished first in the league stage, he defeated Steve Davis 5–3 in the semi-finals, and Stephen Hendry 6–0 in the final. O'Sullivan then reached the final of the Masters, but lost 9–10 against Higgins. In the deciding frame, he scored 60 points ahead before losing the vital red and Higgins, made a 64 clearance to win the match. O'Sullivan skipped the Malta Cup, and then lost his opening matches at the next two ranking events, as he lost 1–5 against Ian McCulloch at the Welsh Open and 0–5 against James Wattana at the China Open.

The 2006 World Championship began with O'Sullivan defeating Dave Harold 10–4, followed by a struggle through to a 13–10 win in his second-round match against Welshman Ryan Day. A similar quarter-final match ensued against Mark Williams. O'Sullivan led 10–6 going into the final session. A fightback by Williams saw him take the lead by winning the next five frames; but O'Sullivan held his nerve to take the match 13–11, and faced Graeme Dott in the semi–finals. Dott took an early lead before O'Sullivan drew level at 8–8 at the end of the second session. Cue-tip problems, which had dogged O'Sullivan throughout the event, recurred, including an incident in which television footage appeared to show O'Sullivan deliberately removing the tip of his cue. This secured him a 15-minute break to re-tip the cue, before he returned and made a 124 break. Tournament Director Mike Ganley accepted the player's assurance that the tip had simply fallen off, and no censure was made. The incident drew criticism from his opponent, and from Steve Davis and John Parrott. Dott then took all eight frames of the third session, leaving himself one frame away from his second final in three years. The final session saw O'Sullivan stage a minor fightback, taking three frames in a row, before a mistake let Dott back in for an eventual clearance on the black. After Dott's win, O'Sullivan gave his cue and case to a boy in the crowd. A BBC report claimed he had used as many as 21 different tips during the fortnight; O'Sullivan later stated that he had used seven tips before arriving in Sheffield, and a further eight during the week, and that he would return next season with a new cue. O'Sullivan's decision not to enter the Malta Cup cost him the number-one rank for the following season.

=== 2006/2007 season: third Masters title ===
On his way to the final of the Northern Ireland Trophy, which he lost 6–9 to Ding Junhui, he defeated semi–final opponent Dominic Dale 6–0, in only 53 minutes—a record for a best-of-11-frames match. O'Sullivan then reached the quarter-finals of the Grand Prix, but lost 1–5 against eventual champion Neil Robertson. In December 2006, in his quarter-final match of the UK Championship against Hendry, O'Sullivan conceded in dramatic fashion part-way into the sixth frame of the best-of-17 match. He had gone 0–4 down after a strong start from Hendry, before finally taking a frame back. At the beginning of the sixth frame, O'Sullivan opened with a break of 24, before leaving himself a difficult shot from black to red. After missing the red, he calmly shook the hand of both Hendry (saying to him that he had "had enough of it, mate") and the match referee, Jan Verhaas, and walked out of the arena, stunning everyone present. The incident caused minor disruption to the other quarter-final match, between Graeme Dott and Steve Davis, being played simultaneously in the same arena. Dott later said that he initially thought that O'Sullivan and Hendry were having a fight when he heard an audience member shout "Get a grip, Ronnie." It was later officially confirmed that O'Sullivan had forfeited the match, which was awarded 9–1 to Hendry. O’Sullivan issued a statement later that day, apologising and saying that he would be "back on his feet fighting stronger and harder than ever very soon." On 31 May 2007, World Snooker fined him a total of £20,800 over this incident, and docked 900 ranking points from him.

O'Sullivan returned to action at the Masters, to a mixed response from the audience (being both booed and clapped). He won his first round match 6–1 on 16 January 2007, against Ali Carter, making two century breaks in the process. However, he then created more controversy by failing to attend a post-match press conference. He did record a short interview with Steve Davis for the BBC, stating that he was much happier than at the UK Championship, and that he was playing well once again. Sir Rodney Walker later issued a statement declaring that O'Sullivan had been excused from dealing with the media because of the exceptional circumstances affecting him. This decision was criticised by Shaun Murphy. O'Sullivan went on to win the tournament against Ding Junhui, on 21 January 2007. In the match, he was noted for his good sportsmanship by Steve Davis, specifically for comforting Ding after the twelfth frame, during which Ding had become visibly upset by an overly partisan member of the crowd, who was later ejected. O'Sullivan was leading 9–3 at the time, and won the next frame for a 10–3 victory.

O'Sullivan went out of the Malta Cup with a 3–5 loss to Michael Holt in the first round. He reached the quarter-finals of the Welsh Open, but lost 4–5 against Neil Robertson. In his quarter-final match against Joe Swail at the Irish Masters, O'Sullivan compiled a maximum break on his way to a narrow 5–4 victory, the second 147 in any professional competition in Ireland. The initial maximum break prize of a Citroën Coupe, worth €20,000, was later withdrawn by the organisers. He then defeated John Higgins 6–5 in the semi-finals, and won the title by defeating Barry Hawkins 9–1 in the final. O'Sullivan then reached the semi-finals of the China Open, but lost 2–6 against eventual champion Graeme Dott. Just before the World Championship, in which he was to play a first-round match with Ding Junhui again, O'Sullivan claimed that the draw was fixed. This was subsequently denied by World Snooker, and O'Sullivan later retracted his accusation. In the end, O'Sullivan won the tie easily by 10 frames to 2. He also won his second-round match against Robertson 13–10 (despite losing six frames in a row at one point), before losing his quarter-final match 9–13 against eventual champion John Higgins.

=== 2007/2008 season: fourth UK Championship and third World Championship title ===
O'Sullivan withdrew from the first ranking event of the season, the Shanghai Masters, citing back problems for which doctors had advised him not to travel. He also chose not to enter the invitational Pot Black tournament. He made the final of the Grand Prix, but lost 6–9 against Marco Fu. During the Northern Ireland Trophy, he set a new record by compiling five centuries in a 5–2 win over Ali Carter. This also included his seventh official competitive 147 maximum break. O'Sullivan went out of the tournament in the next round, having lost against Fergal O'Brien. On 2 December 2007, he won a fourth consecutive, and record seventh total, Premier League Snooker title, by beating John Higgins in the final by a score of 7–4. Earlier in the tournament, during his league stage match against Neil Robertson, he made the 500th competitive century break of his career. On 15 December 2007, O'Sullivan compiled his eighth maximum break in competition, in the deciding frame of his UK Championship semi–final against Mark Selby at Telford, equalling Hendry's record. In doing so, he also became only the third person in professional competition to compile a maximum to win a match. Hendry had made the first against O'Sullivan in the 1997 Charity Challenge final, and Mark Williams had made the second, at the Crucible in the first round of the 2005 World Championship. O'Sullivan is also the second player after John Higgins to make breaks of 147 in two consecutive ranking tournaments (2007 Northern Ireland Trophy and 2007 Maplin UK Championship). He then went on to win the tournament, beating Stephen Maguire 10–2 in the final (from 8–0 up), thereby receiving a £100,000 cheque for winning his first ranking tournament in almost three years.

At the Masters on 12 January, Stephen Maguire edged out O'Sullivan in a final frame to win their first-round match at Wembley. In a battle of the top two players in the provisional world rankings, O'Sullivan fought back from 1–4 down to level at 5–5 and take the match into a deciding eleventh frame. O'Sullivan missed the final blue with the rest, when poised to win the match, allowing Maguire to reach the quarter-finals. After withdrawing from the invitational Malta Cup, O'Sullivan returned at the Welsh Open in February. Playing a good tournament, he reached the final. Although he led 8–5, Selby won the last four frames to beat him 9–8. O'Sullivan was present at the China Open, in Beijing, where he lost 4–5 to Marco Fu in the first round. However, at the press conference, which followed the match, O'Sullivan was heard making some lewd remarks inviting a member of the press to perform fellatio on him, then laughing with the World Snooker media spokesman. O'Sullivan also joked about the size and girth of his penis, before simulating a sexual act on his microphone. In June 2008, the WPBSA punished him for his behaviour by docking the appearance money and world-ranking points that he had earned from the event.

At the 2008 World Championships, O'Sullivan compiled a record-breaking ninth competitive maximum break against Mark Williams. It was his third of the season, and also his third maximum at the Crucible. It was the fourth maximum to be compiled in a winning frame of a match (following those of Hendry, Williams, and O'Sullivan himself). Interviewed by Steve Davis just after beating Williams 13–7, he said "I can finally buy a Bentley Continental GT". Soon after O'Sullivan potted the final black, commentator Dennis Taylor called him a "total genius". However, O'Sullivan's 147 was equalled by Ali Carter in the same tournament, thus halving the prize money. O'Sullivan defeated Liu Chuang, Mark Williams, Liang Wenbo and Stephen Hendry en route to the final of the tournament. After the match, Hendry described O'Sullivan as "the best in the world by a country mile". He then beat Carter 18–8 to win the title on 5 May. In an interview after his third world title win, he hinted again that he might not play in the 2008/2009 season, but also stated that he might go on to pursue many more world titles. At the end of the season O'Sullivan left management company 110sport, to join the Romford-based Grove Leisure. In late 2020 in an interview show with Eurosport titled The Joy of Six where he is asked about each triumph on the biggest stage, he confessed his obnoxious antics in China not long before the World Championships was to give him a big incentive to focus on winning the tournament, a make or break moment for his career as he feared courting a bad reputation the way he did could lead to him being banned by organisers, threatening his very existence as a player so he was playing for survival so to speak, the ploy ended up paying extreme dividends with perhaps his most focused and best world championship run of his career.

=== 2008/2009 season: fourth Masters title ===
O'Sullivan began the 2008–09 season by winning the Northern Ireland Trophy, defeating Dave Harold 9–3 in the final. O'Sullivan is the only player to win back-to-back ranking events in the last four years. He then reached the final of the Shanghai Masters, having defeated Stephen Maguire in the semi–finals with two of the top breaks of 141 and 145. However, in the final, he was defeated 8–10 by qualifier Ricky Walden. In the Premier League, he secured a 7–2 win over Mark Selby, which meant that he had won the event eight times in total, and five times consecutively. However, O'Sullivan failed to defend his UK Championship title, losing to Joe Perry 5–9 in the second round. O'Sullivan had conceded the twelfth game of the match to go 5–7 down, although Perry held a lead of only 23 points to zero. Commenting afterwards, O'Sullivan said "It might have looked like I lost my head or whatever, but I'm sure I'll bounce back." For this he was later fined £300, and was ordered to pay £1,000 in costs.

In the Masters, O'Sullivan reached the final by beating Joe Perry, Ali Carter and Stephen Maguire. In a tense final against defending champion Mark Selby, neither player was able to obtain a sizeable lead, with frames littered with both big breaks and close finishes. After leading 3–1, O'Sullivan ended the afternoon session at 4–4, and took the first frame of the evening session. Selby, however, then won the next 3 frames to lead 7–5. O'Sullivan responded by taking three frames in succession himself, to lead 8–7. The following two frames were shared, and at 9–8, after both players had wasted chances, O'Sullivan constructed a break of 55, beating Mark Selby 10–8 and thereby claiming the title for the fourth time. In doing this he became only the second player, after Stephen Hendry, to win the trophy more than three times. In his post-match interview, O'Sullivan proclaimed his victory, composed with a cue that he had obtained only the previous Saturday, as his greatest achievement in snooker. During an exhibition in Ireland in January 2009, O'Sullivan and Jimmy White made maximum breaks in consecutive frames. In the first round of the 2009 World Championship O'Sullivan compiled three centuries in his 10–5 win against Stuart Bingham. O'Sullivan compiled a 140 break in the second, a 104 in the eighth, and a 103 in the 14th. He was defeated in the second round 11–13, by Mark Allen, after having led 9–7.

=== 2009/2010 season: Masters runner-up ===
He began the season by winning the Shanghai Masters, defeating Liang Wenbo 10–5 in the final. On the way to the final, he lost only 6 frames. He beat Graeme Dott 5–0 in the first round, Marco Fu 5–2 in the second round, Ding Junhui 5–3 in the quarter-finals, and John Higgins 6–1 in the semi–finals. After his Shanghai Masters victory, he joined the newly founded Snooker Players Association. In the second ranking event, the Grand Prix, he beat Jamie Burnett 5–3 in the first round, but then lost narrowly against John Higgins in the second round, by 4–5. On 29 November 2009, O'Sullivan did not retain his Premier League Snooker title, with Shaun Murphy defeating him 7–3 in the final. Following his 9–3 victory over Matthew Stevens in the first round of the UK Championship on 7 December 2009, O'Sullivan caused controversy in his post-match press conference. He described the outgoing regime at the World Professional Billiards and Snooker Association (headed by Sir Rodney Walker) as "a cancer running through the game", and also said "leukaemia has set in". He went on to endorse the new era of snooker, headed by Barry Hearn. He then won his next two matches, 9–3 against Peter Ebdon in the last 16, and Mark Selby in the quarter-finals, before losing the semi–final 8–9 to John Higgins, despite having come back from 2–8 to 8–8.

O'Sullivan began the defence of his Masters title by defeating Neil Robertson 6–4 in the first round, after having trailed 0–3. After this, he defeated Peter Ebdon 6–3 in the quarter-final. In the semi-final he beat Mark Williams 6–5, to reach his sixth Masters final in seven years. O'Sullivan met Mark Selby in the final for the second consecutive year, and lost 9–10 despite having led 9–6. In the Welsh Open, he reached the semi–finals by beating Stuart Bingham 5–1 in the first round, Jamie Cope 5–0 in the second round, and Mark Allen 5–2 in the quarter-finals, but lost 4–6 against John Higgins in the semi–finals. O'Sullivan lost 3–5 in the first round of the China Open, against 22-year-old wild card Tian Pengfei. With this, he also lost his chance to defend his official World No. 1 spot. At the World Championship, he defeated Liang Wenbo 10–7 in the first round and Mark Williams 13–10 in the second round, before losing 11–13 to Mark Selby in the quarter-finals.

=== 2010/2011 season ===
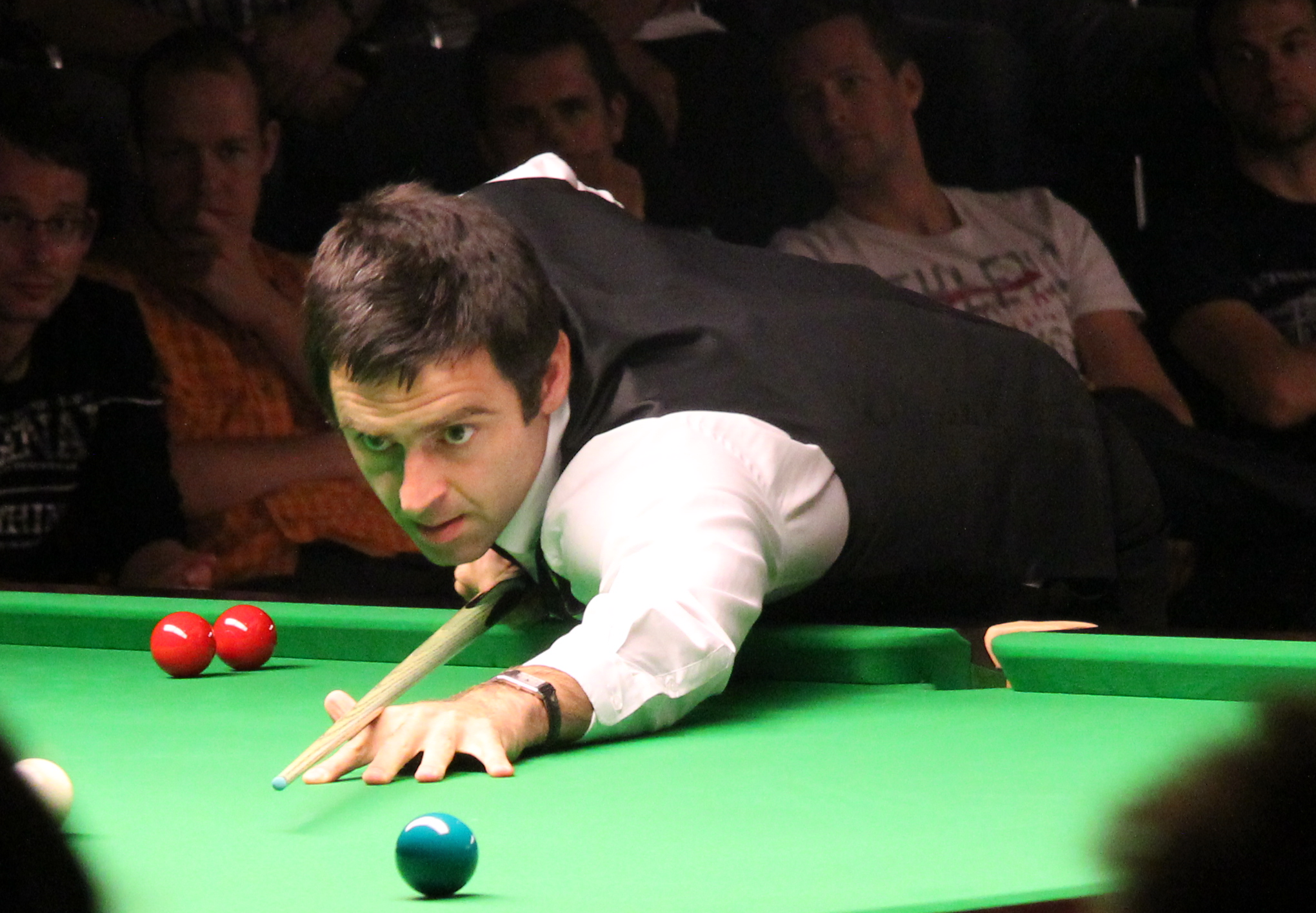
2011 Paul Hunter Classic

O'Sullivan began the 2010–11 season at Event 1 of the Players Tour Championship, where he lost 0–4 in the quarter-finals against Jamie Cope. O'Sullivan next competed at Event 4, where he reached the final, but he lost 3–4 against Barry Pinches. At the World Open O'Sullivan made his record 10th maximum break in the last frame of his match against Mark King, which he won 3–0. However, he had to be persuaded by referee Jan Verhaas to play the final black, as he had become aware that there was no distinct prize money for a maximum break in the tournament, but only a prize of £4,000 for the highest break. Even then, he played the final black in a nonchalant fashion. O'Sullivan then defeated Jimmy White (3–1), Stephen Hendry (3–1), Stephen Maguire (3–1) and Peter Ebdon (3–1) to reach the final, where he lost 1–5 against Neil Robertson. O'Sullivan participated at the Premier League Snooker, and qualified for the finals unbeaten. He then defeated Neil Robertson 5–1 in the semi-finals, and Shaun Murphy 7–1 in the final, to claim his ninth Premier League Snooker title in 14 years. In the UK Championship in December, O'Sullivan suffered an early exit, losing 6–9 against Stuart Bingham in the first round.

At the Masters in January, O'Sullivan went out 4–6 in the first round against Mark Allen. O'Sullivan reached the semi-finals in the Snooker Shoot-Out in January 2011, before losing against Robert Milkins. He made the two highest breaks of the tournament, 112 and 123. He then lost in the first round of the next two ranking tournaments, both times against Ryan Day. He lost 2–4 at the Welsh Open, and 2–5 at the China Open. He reached the quarter-finals of the World Championship by defeating Dominic Dale 10–2 in the first round and Shaun Murphy 13–10 in the second round, but lost 10–13 against eventual winner John Higgins.

=== 2011/2012 season: fourth World Championship title ===
O'Sullivan began the 2011–12 season at Event 1 of the Players Tour Championship, where he won 4–0 in the final against Joe Perry. At the Paul Hunter Classic, he made the 11th official maximum break of his career, and set a new record of career maximum breaks. He reached the semi-finals, but lost 3–4 against Mark Selby. His next tournament was the Shanghai Masters, where he reached the second round, but lost 3–5 against Anthony Hamilton. In October 2011 he won the Kay Suzanne Memorial Trophy, by defeating Matthew Stevens 4–2 in the final. In November 2011 he reached the final of the Antwerp Open, but lost 3–4 against Judd Trump. After 12 of 12 events, O'Sullivan was ranked number two on the Order of Merit, and qualified for the Finals, but withdrew for medical reasons.

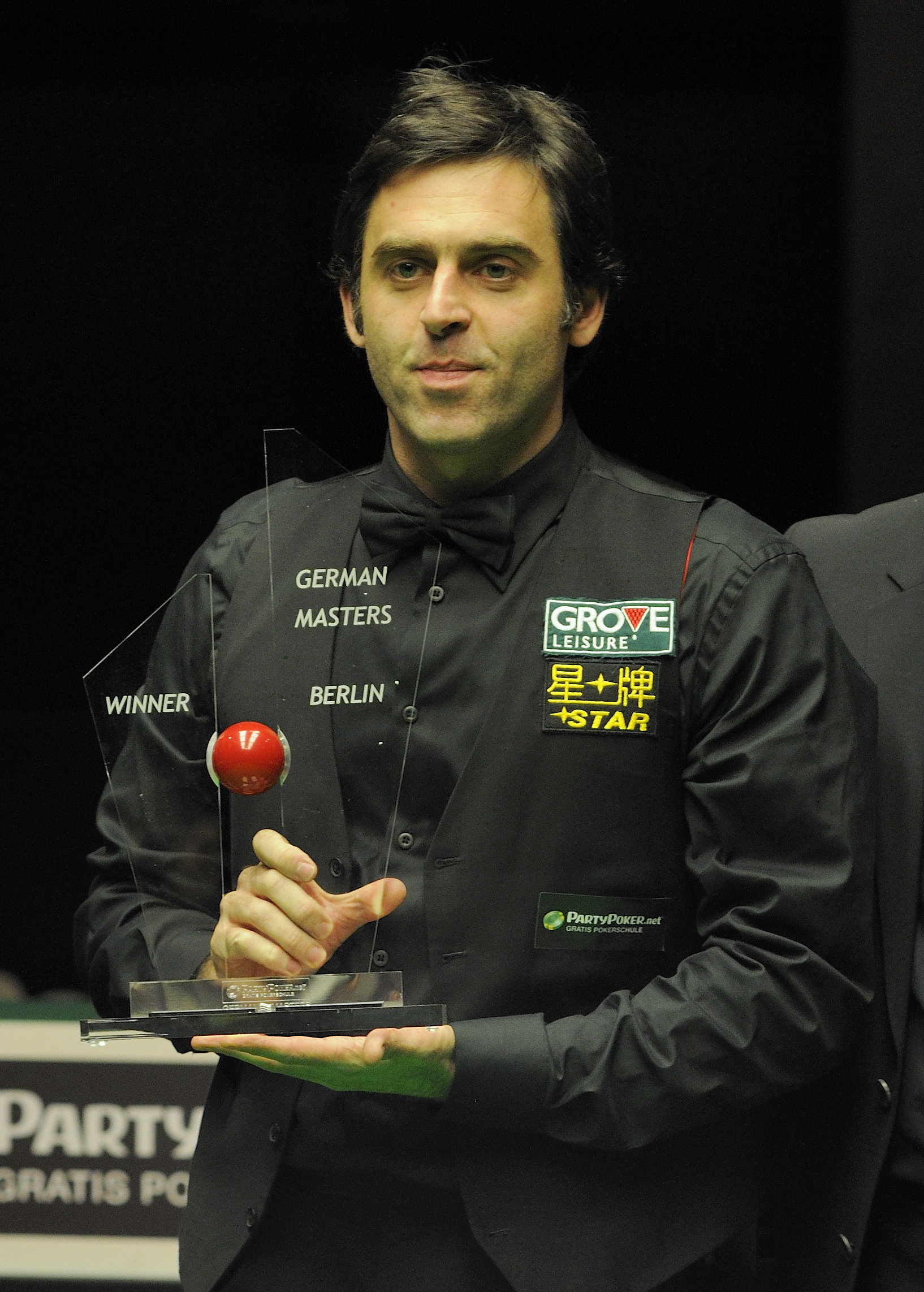
2012 German Masters

O'Sullivan won the 10th Premier League title of his career, a record number of wins for any tournament in the modern era. After topping the table in the league stage, he defeated Mark Williams to reach the final, where he defeated Ding Junhui 7–1. His next tournament was the UK Championship, where he lost in the second round 5–6 against eventual champion Judd Trump. At the Masters, he again lost against Trump, this time 2–6 in the quarter-finals. At the German Masters, he reached his first ranking final since the 2010 World Open, and won 9–7 against Stephen Maguire, despite having trailed 0–4 against Andrew Higginson in the first round. He then reached the semi-finals of the Welsh Open, and the quarter-finals of the China Open, but lost 2–6 against Mark Selby and 4–5 against Maguire.

At the World Championship O'Sullivan saw off former world champions in each of his first three matches. He beat Peter Ebdon 10–4 in the first round, Mark Williams 13–6 in the second, and Neil Robertson 13–10 in the quarter-finals. He beat two-time runner-up Matthew Stevens 17–10 in the semi-finals, and defeated Ali Carter 18–11 in the final, to win his fourth world title. Aged 36, and just 40 days older than Dennis Taylor was when he won the title in 1985, O'Sullivan became the oldest world champion since 45-year-old Ray Reardon in 1978. In the eighth frame of the final, O'Sullivan made a break of 141, the highest break ever recorded in a Crucible final. He was ranked world number nine at the end of the season. On 10 May 2012, O'Sullivan was named as the World Snooker Player of the Year and the Snooker Writers Player of the Year. He was also inducted into the Hall of Fame, along with Walter Donaldson, Mark Williams and John Higgins.

=== 2012/2013 season: extended break and fifth World Championship title ===
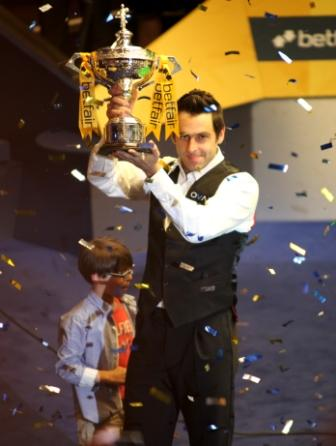
O'Sullivan after winning his fifth World title

On 6 June, the World Professional Billiards and Snooker Association released a statement announcing that O'Sullivan had not signed the official players' contract and would therefore not be eligible to play in any 2012–13 World Snooker event until he did so. On the same day O'Sullivan said that he found the contract "too onerous" and that he was in a stage of his career where he did not wish to make the commitment. On 7 August it was announced that he had now signed the contract and would be playing in October's International Championship and December's UK Championship. After the Shanghai Masters he dropped out of the top sixteen for the first time since entering it in the 1994–95 season, as he was ranked world number 17. O'Sullivan's return to snooker was short-lived, as he withdrew from the inaugural International Championship due to advice from his doctor not to travel. On 6 November O'Sullivan announced that he had withdrawn from every event he had entered and that he would not play for the remainder of the season. However, on 26 February O'Sullivan announced during a press conference that he would return to the game and defend his World Championship title.

At the Crucible O'Sullivan defeated Marcus Campbell in the last 32, Ali Carter in the last 16, Stuart Bingham in the quarter-finals and Judd Trump in the semi-finals. During the third session in frame 23 after missing a red he appears to make a lewd gesture with his cue and was issued a verbal warning by referee Michaela Tabb, O'Sullivan insisted his cue was sticky and he was merely wiping it. While his concentration seemed to be affected with him losing the frame he went on to win the match comfortably and so he reached the final without falling behind even once, and defeated Barry Hawkins 18–12 to win his fifth world title. O'Sullivan's break of 103 in the 15th frame was his 128th century break at the Crucible Theatre, breaking Stephen Hendry's record of 127 Crucible centuries. During the final he extended the record to 131 century breaks. O'Sullivan became the only player to score six century breaks in a World Championship final. He also became only the third player to retain his title at the Crucible after Steve Davis and Stephen Hendry.

However, after his title win, O'Sullivan refused definitively to rule out a title defence in 2014, saying in a post-match interview that "I just love playing, so I will definitely be playing in some smaller events, and we will just see what goes on."

=== 2013/2014 season: fifth Masters title and World Championship runner-up ===
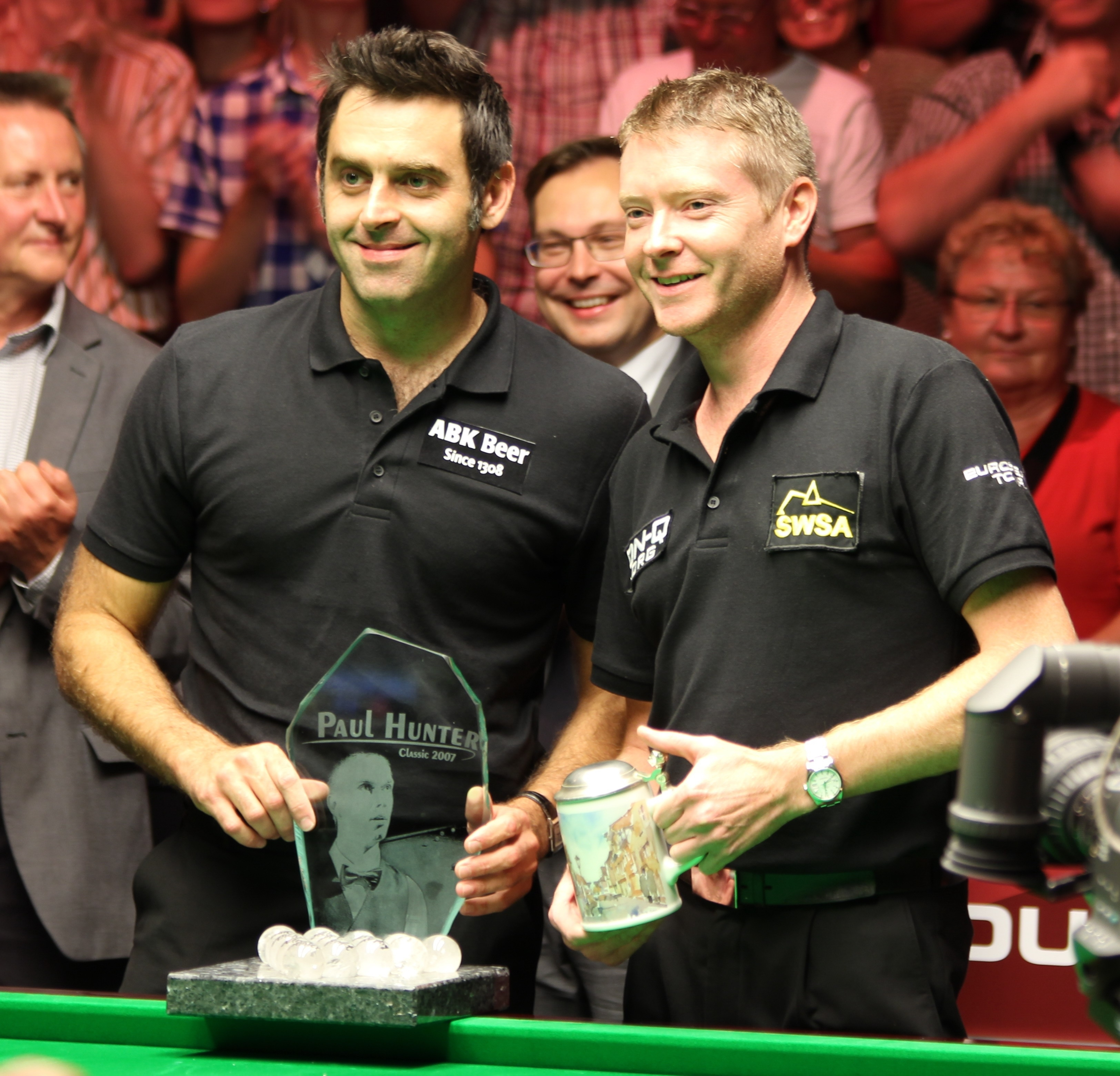
O'Sullivan after winning the Paul Hunter Classic

O'Sullivan started the 2013–14 season ranked number 19. Although he was out of the top 16, winning the World Championship the previous season allowed him to be seeded in every tournament he decided to enter (number 1 in World Championship 2014 and number 2, behind the defending champion, for all the others. For personal reasons, he pulled out of the first ranking tournament of the season, the Wuxi Classic, shortly before he was due to face Michael Wasley in the qualifying round. In June 2013 he competed in the Bulgarian Open, his first tournament appearance outside England in 15 months, but lost 2–4 against John Higgins in the semi-finals. He went on to win the Paul Hunter Classic by defeating Gerard Greene 4–0 in the final. O'Sullivan then qualified for the International Championship by defeating Joel Walker 6–1 in the qualifying round, and defeated Anthony McGill 6–2 at the venue, before losing 4–6 against Liang Wenbo in the last 32. After that O'Sullivan reached the final of the Antwerp Open, but lost 3–4 against Mark Selby, despite leading 3–1. In the Champion of Champions he defeated Ding Junhui and Neil Robertson in final frame deciders and went on to win the title by defeating Stuart Bingham 10–8 in the final. He reached the quarter-finals of the UK Championship, but lost 4–6 against Bingham, despite making breaks of 135 and 127 in the match.

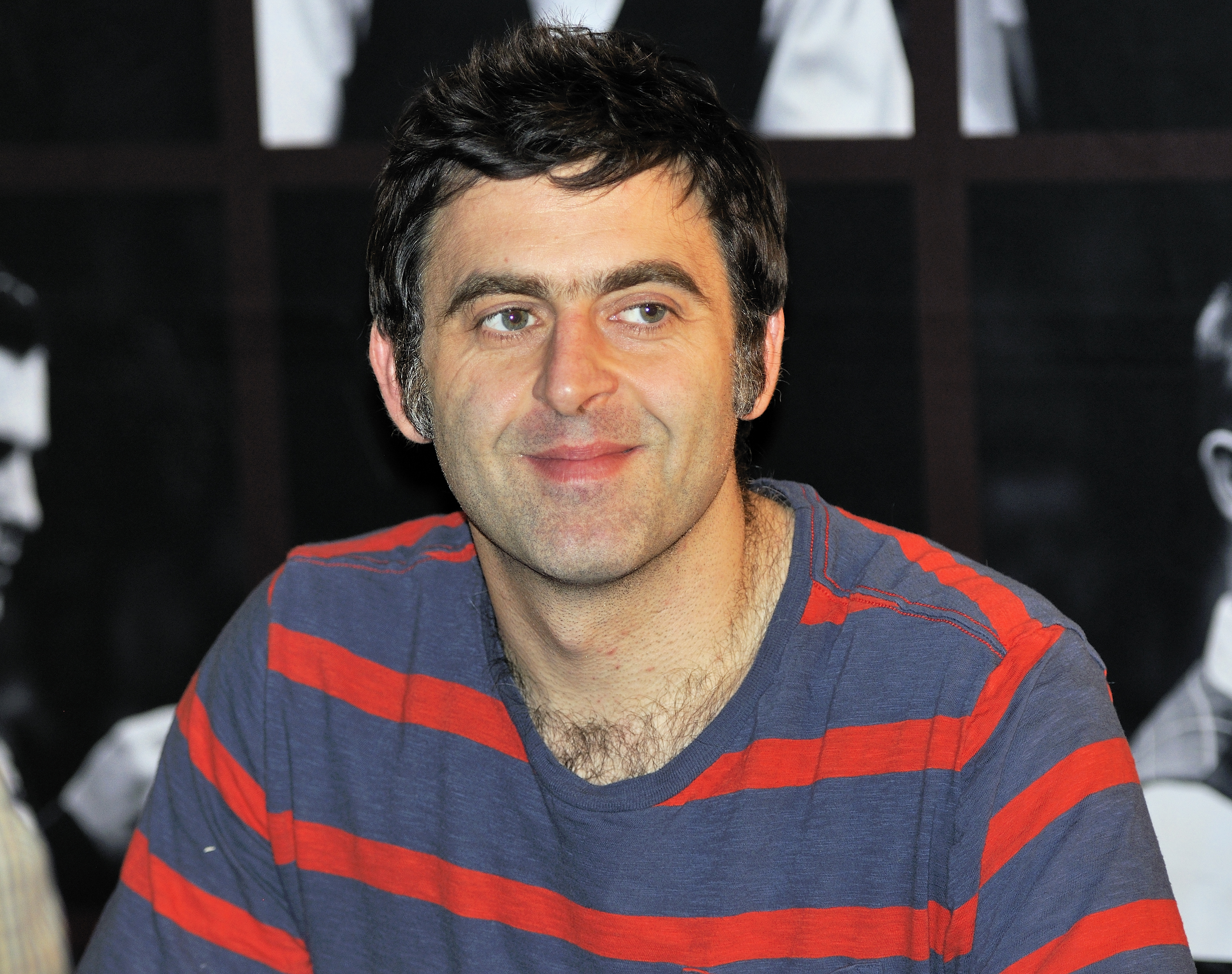
Ronnie O’Sullivan at an autograph session in Berlin after he could not qualify for the German Masters

At the Masters, O'Sullivan defeated Robert Milkins 6–1 in the first round, before he whitewashed Ricky Walden 6–0 in the quarter-finals, a match that lasted just 57 minutes and 48 seconds. During the match he scored 556 points without reply, a new record in a professional event, beating the previous record of 495 points set by Ding Junhui at the 2007 Premier League Snooker. He defeated Stephen Maguire 6–2 in the semi-finals to reach a record tenth Masters final, surpassing the nine appearances by Stephen Hendry. Facing defending champion Mark Selby in the final, he took a 7–1 lead in the first session, before going on to a 10–4 victory for his fifth Masters title. On 22 January 2014, the Disciplinary Committee of the WPBSA issued a statement that O'Sullivan had been found in breach of the association's Members Rules. It fined him £6,000 and ordered him to pay £1,000 in costs over three posts on his personal Twitter account, made in September and October 2013, that it deemed damaging to the image of the sport. The first post related to match-fixing allegations, the second to a suggestion that he had used performance-enhancing drugs, and the third to a tweet that was described as "offensive". The committee fined him an additional £1,000 for making "abusive, insulting and disrespectful" comments to referee Jan Verhaas during the December 2013 qualifying round for the German Masters. The incident arose after Verhaas asked O'Sullivan to tuck his shirt in during the match. O'Sullivan apologised for his conduct with the referee, stating that he felt unwell on the day and that the venue was overly warm.

At the Welsh Open, O'Sullivan defeated Ricky Walden 4–1 in the last 16, John Higgins 5–1 in the quarter-finals, and Barry Hawkins 6–2 in the semi-finals. He defeated Ding Junhui 9–3 in the final to win his third Welsh Open title, and the 26th ranking title of his career. In the last frame of the final, he compiled a record 12th maximum break in professional competition, breaking the previous record of 11 maximum breaks that he had held jointly with Stephen Hendry. During the season O'Sullivan competed at the Players Tour Championship, and finished second on the European Tour Order of Merit, to qualify for the Players Championship Grand Final. There he defeated Scott Donaldson 4–0 in the last 32, but lost 3–4 against Yu Delu in the last 16, despite making a 140, the highest break of the tournament.

At the World Championship, O'Sullivan began his title defence by beating Robin Hull 10–4 in the first round. Playing Joe Perry in the second round, O'Sullivan was behind for the first two sessions, but recovered to win the match 13–11. Up against Shaun Murphy in the 16th World Championship quarter-final of his career, O'Sullivan took 13 of the last 14 frames to win the match 13–3, with a session to spare. He defeated Barry Hawkins 17–7 in the semi-finals, also with a session to spare, to reach his sixth World Championship final. Facing Mark Selby in the final, O'Sullivan began strongly, taking a 10–5 lead, but lost 10 of the next 12 frames to trail 12–15. The third session was particularly grindy with only 6 frames played in the session instead of 8. The crucial final frame would have been O'Sullivan's for a 1 frame lead going into the final session but he drastically overhit the pink clearing the colours, failing to pot it perhaps as a result of misinterpreting the scoreboard as the pink was frameball. He went on to lose 14–18, his first ever defeat in a World Championship final. At around 1:30 a.m., on their way home from the final, O'Sullivan and his six-year-old son were involved in a car crash. Neither O'Sullivan nor his son were injured. After the World Championship, a new ranking system took effect, based on a two-year rolling prize money list rather than ranking points. This meant that O'Sullivan ended the season ranked number 4.

=== 2014/2015 season: fifth UK Championship title ===
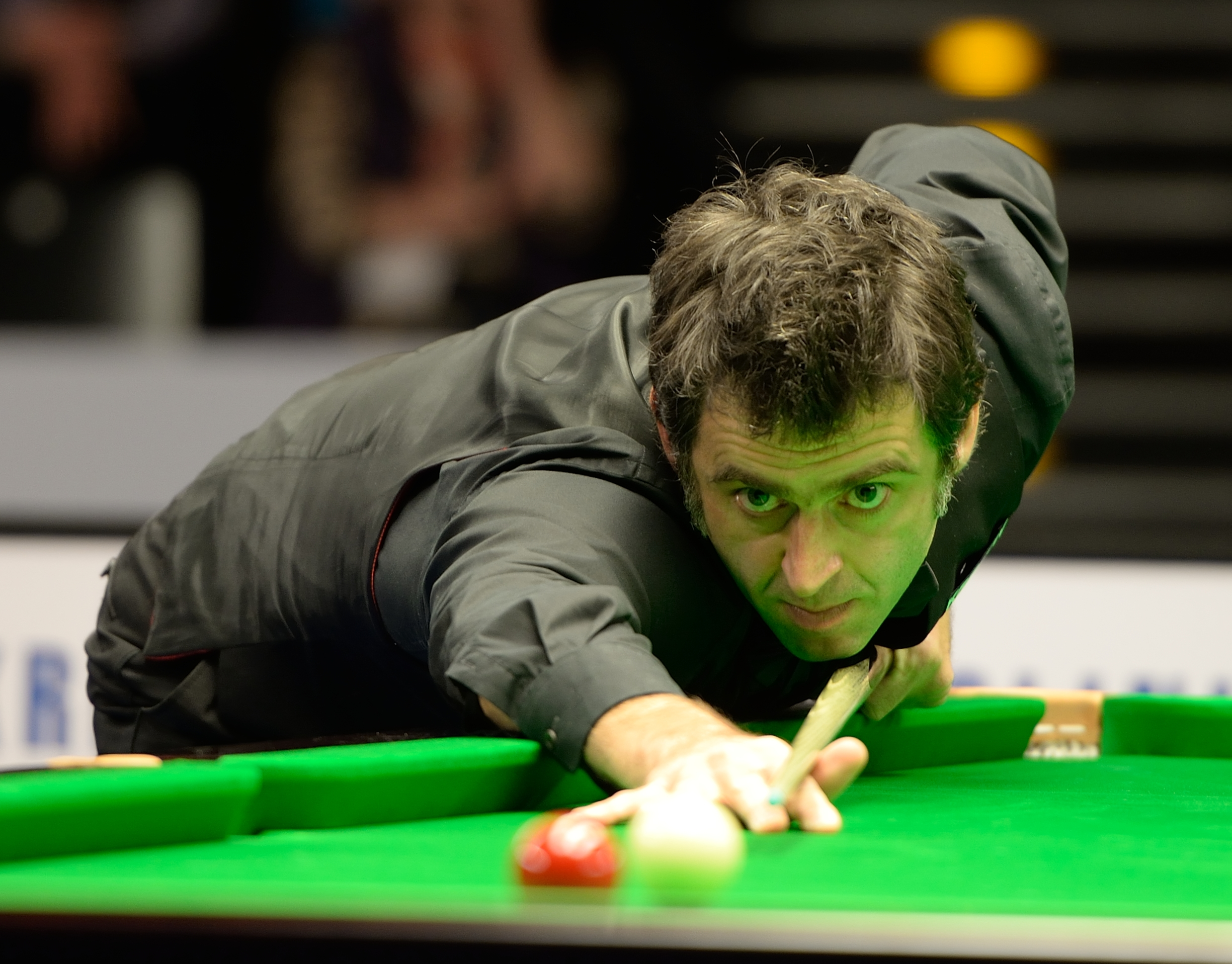
2015 German Masters

O'Sullivan started the 2014–15 season at the Paul Hunter Classic, but lost 2–4 against Tian Pengfei in the last 16. His first ranking event was the Shanghai Masters, where he lost 3–5 against Alan McManus. Ronnie O'Sullivan then competed in the International Championship, cited as the biggest event in Asia, in Chengdu after beating James Cahill to qualify. Having battled to beat Ben Woollaston 6–4, in his opening match of the tournament, Ronnie sailed past his next two opponents, McGill and Li Hang, 6–1. This set up a meeting with Mark Williams, a man who had not beat O'Sullivan for 12 years, in the quarters; however, after falling 3–0 behind, Williams won the next 5 frames and eventually the match, 6–5. O'Sullivan next competed in the Champion of Champions where he was defending champion. O'Sullivan begun his defence with a 4–2 defeat of Stuart Bingham. He then went on to whitewash Marco Fu 6–0 to reach the semi-final. In the semi-final, O'Sullivan defeated Ding Junhui 6–4 and then went on to defeat Judd Trump in a high-scoring final, 10–7, making four century breaks and eleven breaks over fifty during the match. On 4 December 2014, O'Sullivan completed his 13th career maximum break in the fourth round of the UK Championship, against Matthew Selt. Three days later he won his fifth UK Championship, coming through 10–9 against Judd Trump in the final. After trailing 1–5 and 4–9, Trump won five frames in succession, before O'Sullivan prevailed in the deciding frame despite playing with a broken ankle, having broken it the previous week whilst running.

In the semi-finals he was defeated 1–6 by Neil Robertson, which meant O'Sullivan lost at that stage for the first time in his Masters' career after 10 prior victories and also ended a winning streak in all competitions which stood at 15 matches. However he did equal and overtake Stephen Hendry's record of 775 centuries earlier in the tournament, Ronnie's 775th century needing a fluked yellow on the baulk cushion to keep the break going to clear up to blue on the colours to make the century break.

In the World Championship, O'Sullivan defeated Craig Steadman 10–3 in the first round and Matthew Stevens 13–5 in the second round, but suffered a 9–13 defeat to Stuart Bingham in the quarter-finals. O'Sullivan was involved in many incidents during the tournament. While playing Steadman, he breached snooker's dress code when he removed a pair of uncomfortable shoes and played briefly in his socks, before borrowing shoes from tournament director Mike Ganley. In his match with Stevens, frustrated at missing a shot, he almost snapped his cue in half by hitting it against the table. In his quarter-final match, O'Sullivan placed his chalk on the table and used it to line up a shot. Controversially, referee Terry Camilleri did not penalize him for the incident, even though many commentators, including former world champion Ken Doherty and former tour referee Michaela Tabb, argued that under the rules of snooker the referee should have called a 7-point foul. These incidents led Stephen Hendry to say that O'Sullivan was not fully focused. "Personally I think it is a sign he has got other things on his mind," said Hendry. "He is not focused properly on winning the World Championship."

=== 2015/2016 season: sixth Masters title ===
O'Sullivan won the pro–am Pink Ribbon tournament in July 2015, defeating Darryn Walker 4–2 in the final, but took a hiatus from the professional tour for almost eight months. He declined to defend his Champion of Champions and UK Championship titles, stating that he was suffering from debilitating insomnia, but he made his debut providing in-studio expert analysis during the UK Championship, alongside Jimmy White. He returned to professional competition in the qualifying rounds for the German Masters in December 2015, defeating Hamza Akbar 5–1 in the first round, but losing 3–5 to Stuart Carrington in the second round.

In the 2016 New Year Honours, he was appointed Officer of the Order of the British Empire (OBE) for his services to snooker.

In group one of the Championship League, he made the 800th competitive century break of his career in his match against Barry Hawkins, and went on to defeat Ricky Walden 3–0 in the semi-finals and Robert Milkins 3–0 in the final, earning a ticket to the winners' group. At the Masters, he defeated Mark Williams 6–5 in the first round, Mark Selby 6–3 in the quarter-finals, and Stuart Bingham 6–3 in the semi-finals to reach the eleventh Masters final of his career. He defeated Barry Hawkins 10–1 in the final to win his sixth Masters title and equal Stephen Hendry's record for the most Masters wins.

At the Welsh Open, O'Sullivan defeated Barry Pinches 4–1 in the first round. In the fifth frame of the match, O'Sullivan declined the opportunity to make a maximum break, potting the pink off the penultimate red and completing a break of 146. He stated afterward that the prize money of £10,000 was not worthy of a 147. World Snooker chairman Barry Hearn called the decision "unacceptable" and "disrespectful". In the second round, he defeated Tian Pengfei 4–0 in just 39 minutes, with breaks of 110, 90, 112 and 102 in the four frames played. Tian scored only 37 points in the match. In the third round, he defeated Jimmy Robertson 4–0 in 55 minutes, a performance that included breaks of 94 and 131 as part of a run of 300 points without reply. He defeated Yu Delu 4–1 in the last 16, and then defeated world number one Mark Selby 5–1 in the quarter-finals, finishing with a break of 132. A 6–3 victory over Joe Perry in the semi-final secured a place in the final against Neil Robertson. Despite trailing 3–5 after the afternoon session, O'Sullivan won all six frames played in the evening session, finishing with a break of 141 to defeat Robertson 9–5 and equal John Higgins's record of four Welsh Open titles. It was his 28th ranking title, which put him in joint second place with Higgins and Steve Davis for the number of career ranking titles. Over the tournament as a whole, O'Sullivan won 36 of the 47 frames he played, and compiled ten century breaks.

At the Championship League, O'Sullivan lost 2–3 in the final against Judd Trump. During the tournament, O'Sullivan's 24-match winning streak came to an end following a 0–3 defeat by Mark Williams. O'Sullivan faced Michael Holt in the first round of the World Grand Prix and lost 3–4.

In the World Championship, O'Sullivan beat David Gilbert 10–7 in the first round. After the match, he refused to attend a mandatory press conference, and also refused to talk to the tournament broadcasters, the BBC. He received a formal warning from World Snooker, and was advised that further breaches of contract would lead to fines. In the second round, he lost 12–13 to Barry Hawkins, his first loss against Hawkins in 14 years and only the second time in 13 years that he had failed to reach the World Championship quarter-finals.

=== 2016/2017 season: UK Championship runner-up and record seventh Masters title ===
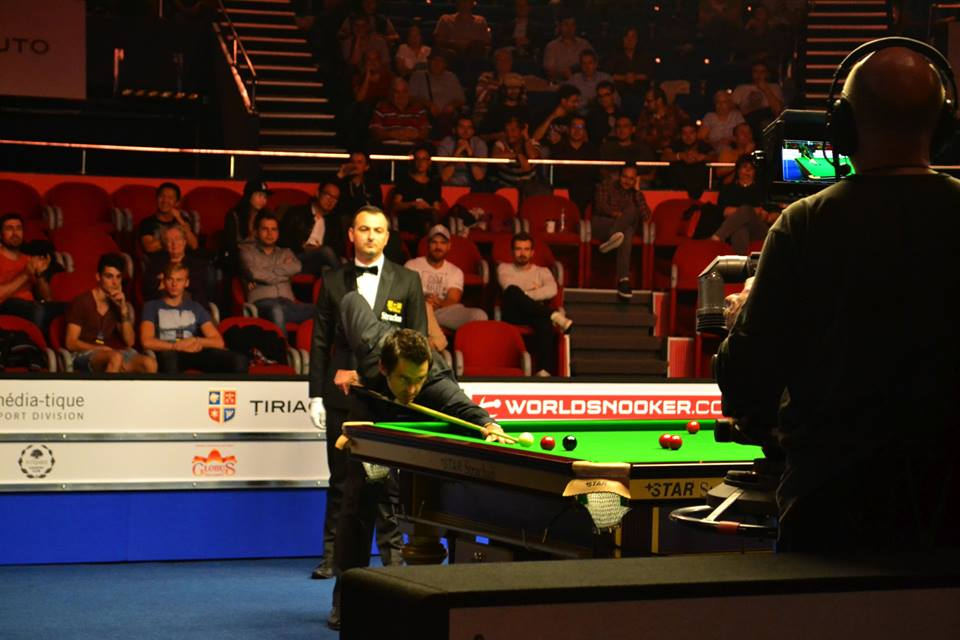
O'Sullivan at 2016 European Masters in Bucharest, Romania

O'Sullivan began the 2016–17 season late, at the Shanghai Masters. In the first round, he defeated Liang Wenbo 5–4 after recovering from 1–4 down. It was his first professional tournament match in five months. However, this was as far as he progressed, as in the second round he lost by 2–5 to Michael Holt. Competing in the inaugural European Masters, O'Sullivan defeated David Gilbert 4–1 in the first round, Mark Allen 4–2 in the second round, Mark Davis 4–1 in the quarter-finals and then whitewashed Neil Robertson 6–0 in the semi-final. Facing Judd Trump in the final, O'Sullivan took a 5–3 lead after the first session. In the second session, O'Sullivan further led 8–6 before eventually losing 8–9. In the first of the Home Nations series of tournaments, at the inaugural English Open, O'Sullivan defeated Jimmy Robertson 4–0 in the first round, Zhao Xintong 4–3 in the second, but then lost to Chris Wakelin in the third by 3–4. At the International Championship, O'Sullivan beat Xiao Guodong 6–4 in the first round and Kurt Maflin 6–4 in the second to reach the last 16. However, he was then defeated by Michael Holt 4–6, making this the third consecutive loss to Holt in 2016.

O'Sullivan returned to action in the Champion of Champions. He won his group by defeating Robin Hull 4–2 in the first round and Martin Gould 6–2 in the second, and he then beat Mark Allen 6–2 in the semi-final with an impressive performance including three century breaks. O'Sullivan however could not reproduce the same form in the final and lost 7–10 to John Higgins. At the inaugural Northern Ireland Open, O'Sullivan defeated David John 4–1 in the first round, Jimmy White 4–1 in the second, and Zhang Anda 4–0 in the third. Kyren Wilson then edged out O'Sullivan 3–4 in the fourth round after O'Sullivan had staged a comeback with three consecutive century breaks after going 0–3 behind.

At the UK Championship, O'Sullivan produced dominant displays in the opening rounds defeating Boonyarit Keattikun 6–0 in the first, Rhys Clark 6–0 in the second and Michael Georgiou 6–1 in the third. He then beat Matthew Stevens 6–2 in the fourth round, Mark Williams 6–2 in the quarter-finals, and Marco Fu 6–5 in a tense semi-final, winning the deciding frame with a decisive break of 130. In the final, O'Sullivan played Mark Selby. In the first session after O'Sullivan went 2–1 up, Selby took advantage of errors by O'Sullivan to win 5 straight frames. However, in a high quality second session, O'Sullivan fought back to close to within one frame at 7–8, but Selby prevailed winning the next two frames and the title 7–10. In the last six frames of the match, a total of 5 century breaks were made, 2 by O'Sullivan of 134 and 130. This defeat marked the first time O'Sullivan had lost in a UK Championship final and the third consecutive defeat in a major final in this season.

O'Sullivan ended 2016 at the Scottish Open. He defeated Matthew Selt 4–2 in the first round, Adam Stefanow 4–1 in the second, Jimmy White 4–2 in the third and Mark Allen 4–2 in the last 16. He was then beaten 2–5 by John Higgins in the quarter-finals.

In the new year, O'Sullivan returned to the Masters as the defending champion. He defeated Liang Wenbo 6–5 in a dramatic first-round match. In the tenth frame, Liang missed the final black in a clearance which would have given him victory. After potting the black, O'Sullivan went on to produce a break of 121 in the deciding frame to win the match. O'Sullivan then beat Neil Robertson 6–3 in the quarter-finals, and Marco Fu 6–4 in the semi-finals to reach his twelfth Masters final despite problems with his cue tip. In the final, he defeated Joe Perry 10–7 to win his seventh Masters title, setting the record for the most number of title wins at the tournament. After the tournament, O'Sullivan received a disciplinary letter from World Snooker over comments he made to the press after his match with Fu. He criticised referee Terry Camilleri's performance and a photographer during post-match interviews. This led to O'Sullivan stating that he would no longer give in-depth answers in interviews or press conferences, claiming "when I share my thoughts, I risk being fined".

At the German Masters, O'Sullivan lost 4–5 to Mark King in the last 32 despite leading 4–1. O'Sullivan entered the World Grand Prix seeded fifth on the one-year ranking list. He defeated Yan Bingtao 4–2 in the first round, but lost 1–4 to Neil Robertson in the second. In the final event of the Home Nations series, the Welsh Open, O'Sullivan progressed past Tom Ford 4–1 in the first round. His defence was then ended early by Mark Davis, who beat him 3–4 in the second round after O'Sullivan had led 3–0.

O'Sullivan entered the Players Championship seeded 7th on the one-year ranking list. He defeated Liang Wenbo 5–1 in the first round, but was defeated 3−5 by Judd Trump in the quarter-finals. At the China Open, O'Sullivan defeated Gareth Allen 5−0 in the first round, but was then upset 4−5 by Mark Joyce in the second.

On the eve of the World Championships, O'Sullivan attended the 40th anniversary celebration of the Crucible Theatre holding the World Snooker Championship as a past champion. O'Sullivan then faced debutant Gary Wilson in the first round. He won five of the first six frames before Wilson fought back by winning three consecutive frames to trail by only 4−5 at the end of the first session. In a high scoring second session, O'Sullivan went on to defeat Wilson 10−7 and celebrated by repeatedly punching the air. Speaking to the media at length for the first time since the Masters, O'Sullivan attacked the WPBSA during his post-match press conference for using "threatening" language in communications with him and said he would no longer be "bullied" by the governing body in future. Jason Ferguson, chairman of the WPBSA, and Barry Hearn, chairman of World Snooker, denied the allegations. Past champions John Higgins and Stuart Bingham backed O'Sullivan with Higgins expressing "sympathy" for him and Bingham saying "he had a point". However, 2005 champion Shaun Murphy claimed that O'Sullivan's comments were "completely wrong". This added further intrigue ahead of the second round clash of O'Sullivan and Murphy. O'Sullivan later issued a statement saying he would "not be making any further comment" during the Championships and would instead focus on his "quest for a sixth world title".

During his second round match, O'Sullivan opened up a four frame advantage over Murphy in the first session to lead 6−2. In the second session, O'Sullivan maintained his advantage to lead 10−6 going into the final session. The third session saw no comeback from Murphy and O'Sullivan progressed to the quarter-finals 13−7. The quarter-finals would be the furthest O'Sullivan would progress, as he fell behind Ding Junhui 6–10 after the opening two sessions. Despite scoring the tournament's highest break with a 146 in the final session, he would eventually lose 10–13. Following his loss, O'Sullivan stated that he had no intention of retiring.

=== 2017–18 season: five ranking titles, including record-equalling sixth UK Championship title ===
The 2017/2018 snooker season saw a return to winning ways for O'Sullivan, capturing joint record five world ranking titles including his 6th UK Championship title. This saw O'Sullivan match Steve Davis' record of six UK titles and Stephen Hendry's record of 18 major titles. This haul marked a personal best for O'Sullivan, with him only previously winning at most three world ranking titles in a single season (2004–05 season). His ranking rose from world no. 14 at the beginning of the season to world no. 2 at the end of the season. O'Sullivan credited his achievements this season to a focus on match snooker.

O'Sullivan reached the final of the invitational Hong Kong Masters after defeating John Higgins and Judd Trump in final frame deciders, before falling to Neil Robertson. In October, after defeating John Higgins 4–3 in a closely fought last 16 contest at the English Open, O'Sullivan romped through the final stages to capture the title, defeating Kyren Wilson 9–2 in the final with a pot success of 98% in the final. O'Sullivan reached his fourth final in five years at the invitational Champion of Champions, compiling his 900th career total century break along the way. He was defeated by Shaun Murphy 8–10, after fighting back from 5–9 down. At the very next tournament though, he won the Shanghai Masters 10–3 against Judd Trump in the final. This was his first title in China since the 2009 Shanghai Masters.

At the first major of the season, the UK championship, a struggling O'Sullivan survived a close final frame encounter with Sunny Akani in the last 16 at the UK Championship, before powering to the title, defeating Martin Gould 6–3, Stephen Maguire 6–4 and then Shaun Murphy 10–5 to win the championship for a record-equalling sixth time. In January 2018, in the first round at The Masters, O'Sullivan recorded a 6–0 whitewash over Marco Fu, compiling three century breaks and scoring 649 points to Fu's 35. However, he was knocked out in the following round by eventual winner Mark Allen, 1–6.

At the World Grand Prix, O'Sullivan defeated Ding Junhui 10–3 in the final. In the quarter-finals, he had compiled four centuries in a 5–0 whitewash of Xiao Guodong. Then, after triumphing over defending champion Judd Trump 6–5 in a high quality semi-final match, O'Sullivan also captured the Players Championship, defeating Shaun Murphy for a second time in a final this season, 10–4.

O'Sullivan made his 14th career total maximum break at the China Open in the match against Elliot Slessor, although he ultimately lost 2–6. He ended the season on a disappointing note, losing in the World Championship to rival Ali Carter, in an ill-tempered match that saw the players shoulder-barge each other when passing at the table. This was the first time Carter had beaten O'Sullivan in a professional match, besides a win in the group stages of the non-ranking 2010 Championship League.

=== 2018–19 season: record seventh UK title and record 19 Triple Crown titles, thirteenth Masters final, 1000th century, return to world number one and a record-equalling 36th ranking title ===
O'Sullivan defended his Shanghai Masters title by beating Barry Hawkins 11–9 in the final. This was O'Sullivan's first tournament of the season. The win made O'Sullivan the first snooker player to surpass £10 million in career prize money. He then competed in the English Open, during which he made his fifteenth maximum break to clinch a 4–0 victory over Allan Taylor in the second round. O'Sullivan reached the semi-finals but lost 1–6 to an in-form Mark Davis. At the Champion of Champions, O'Sullivan reached his fifth consecutive final and won 10–9 in a final frame decider against Kyren Wilson, having made 11 centuries during the event. His next tournament was the Northern Ireland Open and faced Judd Trump in the final. He lost the match 7–9. O'Sullivan won the UK Championship with a 10–6 victory over Mark Allen in the final, marking his record seventh UK Championship title and a record of nineteen Triple Crown titles overall. Less than 24 hours after his win, O'Sullivan withdrew from the Scottish Open.

At the 2019 Masters, O'Sullivan showed good form in reaching another Masters Final, beating Stuart Bingham 6–2 in round one and then recording 6–3 victories over Ryan Day and Ding Junhui in the quarter-finals and semi finals respectively. In the final, however, O'Sullivan was comprehensively outplayed by in-form Judd Trump; trailing 1–7 after the first of two sessions, O'Sullivan made two centuries in the evening session but was eventually defeated 4–10, his biggest loss in a Masters Final.

O'Sullivan reached another final at the Players Championship. He overcame Barry Hawkins in the first round, winning 6–4 before winning another close match against Higgins by the same score. O'Sullivan's semi final was a much easier affair; he whitewashed an out-of-sorts Allen 6–0 under difficult playing conditions, with the state of the table being criticised by TV commentators, to set up a final against Neil Robertson . O'Sullivan dominated the final and took a 7–2 lead into the evening session, making breaks of 116 and 105 to see his tally of career centuries stand at 999. O'Sullivan rounded off a 10–4 victory by scoring his 1000th century break in the winning frame, becoming the first player in snooker history to reach this milestone.

At the Tour Championship, O'Sullivan eased through Stuart Bingham 9−3, then came back from 6−2 down and 8−5 down to defeat Judd Trump 10−9 in a match that went to the final black. In a rematch of the Players Championship final 2 weeks before, O'Sullivan defeated Neil Robertson 13−11 to claim his 36th ranking title, equalling Stephen Hendry's record. This win also catapulted O'Sullivan back to world number one, 9 years since he last held the spot.

At the World Championship, O'Sullivan suffered a shock first-round defeat at the hands of 23-year-old debutant James Cahill, who was also the first amateur ever to compete at the Crucible. O'Sullivan trailed 4−5 after the first session, then fell 5−8 behind before rallying to level the match at 8−8. However, Cahill won the final two frames to record a 10−8 victory. It was O'Sullivan's fourth first-round loss in his 27 Crucible campaigns.

=== 2019–20 season: sixth World Championship title (record 37th ranking title) ===
O'Sullivan once again defended his Shanghai Masters title by beating Shaun Murphy 11–9 in the final. It was O'Sullivan's first tournament of the season just like previous season. His first appearance in a ranking event was the 2019 English Open, where he lost 3–4 to Mei Xiwen in the last 16.

After failing to qualify for the 2019 World Open, O'Sullivan performed at the 2019 Champion of Champions, where he won his group after beating Jimmy White 4–3 and John Higgins 6–3 before being beaten 5–6 by Neil Robertson. It was the first time when O'Sullivan entered the Champion of Champions tournament and failed to reach the final. He then reached the final of the 2019 Northern Ireland Open, where he lost 7–9 to Judd Trump in a high-quality match which included six century breaks and three maximum break attempts. He then tried to defend his UK Championship title, but lost 4–6 to eventual tournament winner Ding Junhui in the last 16. One week later, O'Sullivan reached the quarter-finals of the 2019 Scottish Open, where he lost 4–5 to Mark Selby, despite making three centuries in that match.

Despite his ranking, he chose not to accept an invitation to play in the 2020 Masters invitational event. O'Sullivan's first performance in 2020 was the World Grand Prix, where he was beaten 3–5 by Graeme Dott. He then reached the semi-finals of the 2020 Welsh Open in which he lost 5–6 to Kyren Wilson. He also played at the 2020 Snooker Shoot Out where he lost in the second round to Billy Joe Castle. Due to a lack of earnings in ranking tournaments over the course of the season, he was unable to defend the Players Championship, as he was pipped to the last remaining place by the two finalists of the Shoot Out.

After the prolonged break caused by the COVID-19 pandemic, O'Sullivan returned to action at the 2020 Championship League. There he won his group without losing a single frame before going out of the tournament in the group winners' stage. He was unable to compete in the 2020 Tour Championship.

At the 2020 World Snooker Championship, O'Sullivan made his 28th consecutive appearance at the Crucible, beating Stephen Hendry's previous record of 27. He started the tournament by beating Thepchaiya Un-Nooh 10–1 in the fastest match in Crucible history which lasted just 108 minutes. He then beat Ding Junhui and Mark Williams (after being 2-7 and 4-8 down) 13–10 each to reach his twelfth Crucible semifinal, where he faced Mark Selby. O'Sullivan won the first session 5–3, but lost 10 out of the next 14 frames to trail 9–13. O'Sullivan won the next four frames to level the match, but then fell behind 14–16 before making breaks of 138 and 71 to take the match to a deciding frame. O'Sullivan made a 64 break before missing a red to the green pocket. Selby scored 34 points before a safety battle on the last red took place. O'Sullivan eventually potted the last red and then cleared the table up to the blue to progress to the final. After the game, Selby accused O'Sullivan of being "disrespectful" after O'Sullivan had played several hit-and-hope shots while snookered. He responded by saying "if I was as good as Mark at escaping from snookers, I could maybe get it safe".

In the final against Kyren Wilson, O'Sullivan won the first session 6–2 before Wilson came back to trail 10–8. O'Sullivan then won the last eight frames of the match to claim his sixth World Championship title and his 20th title in the Triple Crown Series. It was also the 37th ranking title of his career, putting him ahead of Stephen Hendry (36) on the all-time list. He won £500,000, doubling his previous biggest winner's cheque and went up to second in the ranking list, having been sixth before the World Championship. At the age of 44 years and 254 days, he became the oldest player to win a world title since Ray Reardon in 1978.

=== 2020–21 season ===
Most of this season was played without fans due to covid restrictions, O'Sullivan made 5 ranking tournament finals but lost all of them (Northern Ireland Open, Scottish Open, Welsh Open, Players Championship & Tour Championship). He admitted in an interview he only put the effort into half of the finals due to lack of interest with the season being played without crowds. This season also saw him use live matches as practise, where he would play on to pot every last ball even in dead frames. He lost his world title defence in the 2nd round in a decider against Anthony McGill, trailing 10-6 going into the last session. This is the first season since 2010-11 where he didn't win any triple crown events.

=== 2021–22 season: Equalling Stephen Hendry's record of World Championship wins ===
At the 2022 World Championship, O'Sullivan made his 30th Crucible appearance, equalling Steve Davis' record. He defeated Judd Trump 18–13 in the final to win his seventh world title — also his 39th ranking title and 21st Triple Crown title — to tie Hendry for the most world titles in the modern era. Aged 46 years and 148 days, O'Sullivan became the oldest world champion in the sport's history, surpassing Reardon, who had held the record since 1978.

=== 2022–23 season: Invitational success and breaking Steve Davis's record for most Crucible appearances ===
In October 2022, O'Sullivan won the invitational 2022 Hong Kong Masters, defeating Marco Fu 6–4 in a final that was played before 9,000 spectators, a record live audience at a snooker match. At the following month's invitational 2022 Champion of Champions, he won the tournament for the fourth time, beating Trump 10–6 in the final. However, he reached only two ranking quarter-finals prior to the World Championship, both of which ended in whitewash defeats; he lost 0–6 to Ding in the 2022 UK Championship quarter-finals, the first time he had been whitewashed in any Triple Crown event, and lost 0–5 to Tian Pengfei in the 2023 Welsh Open quarter-finals. He did not place highly enough on the one-year ranking list to qualify for the 2023 Players Championship or the 2023 Tour Championship.

At the 2023 World Snooker Championship, O'Sullivan made a record 31st Crucible appearance, breaking Steve Davis's previous record of 30 appearances. In his second-round match against Hossein Vafaei, he made both his 200th century break at the Crucible and his 1,200th century break in professional competition. He reached the World Championship quarter-finals for a record-extending 21st time, also becoming the first player to compete in 100 matches at the Crucible, but lost 10–13 to eventual champion Brecel. However, he ended the season as world number one.

=== 2023–24 season: A fourth consecutive Shanghai Masters title, record-extending eighth UK Championship and Masters titles, and the World Grand Prix ===
The 2023-24 snooker season marked a return to China for the first time since 2019, mainly due to the effects of the COVID-19 pandemic. Ronnie O'Sullivan was the defending Shanghai Masters champion and had not lost a match in this event since his defeat to Michael Holt in the 2016 tournament. O'Sullivan's rich run of form in this event continued, as he defeated reigning World Champion Luca Brecel 11–9 in the final to record his 18th consecutive Shanghai Masters match win, as well as his fourth consecutive Shanghai Masters title and fifth title in this event overall.

The 2023 UK Championship marked the 30th anniversary of Ronnie O'Sullivan's first ranking title and first Triple Crown title at the 1993 UK Championship, where he broke Stephen Hendry's record as the youngest player to win a ranking title at the age of 17 years and 358 days, a record that he still holds. Thirty years later, O'Sullivan reached his 9th UK Championship final and his 30th Triple Crown final overall, where he faced three-time UK Champion Ding Junhui. O'Sullivan emerged as a 10–7 victor to achieve a record-extending eighth UK Championship title and 22nd Triple Crown title, making him the oldest player in history to win this event, at the age of 47 years and 363 days.

O'Sullivan defeated Ali Carter 10-7 in the final of the 2024 Masters, making it a record-extending eighth Masters; a title he last held in 2017. He won his first Masters at the age of 19 years and 69 days in 1995 and his latest at 48 years and 39 days. Making him both the youngest and oldest winner of the Masters.

One week after winning the Masters, Ronnie beat Judd Trump 10–7 to win the World Grand Prix final for his third time. During the Players Championship, O'Sullivan's 16-match winning streak came to an end following a 0–6 defeat by Mark Selby. At the inaugural World Masters of Snooker, the first professional snooker tournament held in Saudi Arabia, he defeated Brecel 5–2 in the final, capturing his fifth professional title of the season. At the 2024 World Championship, O'Sullivan suffered a 10–13 loss to Stuart Bingham in the quarter-finals.

=== 2024–25 ===
O'Sullivan began the 2024–25 season at the 2024 Championship League, but was eliminated in the first group stage. At the Shanghai Masters he lost 3–10 to Judd Trump in the semi-finals, his first defeat at the tournament since 2016, after 20 consecutive match wins. O'Sullivan also recorded a semi-final run at the inaugural Xi'an Grand Prix, losing 4–6 to Kyren Wilson. At the Saudi Arabia Snooker Masters, O'Sullivan, who signed a three-year ambassadorial deal with Saudi Arabia, which requires him to play in all World Snooker Tour events staged in that country, to establish a snooker academy in the Middle East, and to contribute to the development of the sport in the region, reached the quarter–finals, where he lost 4–6 to Si Jiahui.

After losing in the first round of the English Open, O'Sullivan withdrew from three subsequent events that he initially entered – the British Open, the Wuhan Open and the Northern Ireland Open. He returned to action at the International Championship, where he lost 4–6 to Pang Junxu. In his opening match at the invitational Champion of Champions O'Sullivan lost 3–4 to Xiao Guodong, despite leading 3–0. He then failed to defend his UK Championship title, losing 4–6 to Barry Hawkins in the first round. After withdrawing from the Scottish Open, O'Sullivan competed in the Riyadh Season Snooker Championship, where he lost 2–4 to Mark Allen in the semi-finals.

In January 2025, O'Sullivan snapped his cue following a defeat to Robert Milkins in the Championship League. That led to him withdrawing from the forthcoming Masters, where he was defending champion, and a string of other events, including the 2025 German Masters, the 2025 Welsh Open, and the 2025 World Grand Prix. He returned to competition at the 2025 World Snooker Championship after a three-month break. Despite cue issues and a lack of competitive action, O'Sullivan progressed through to the semi-finals, where he was defeated 7–17 by Zhao Xintong with a session to spare.

=== 2025–26: Two maximum breaks in a one-session match, highest break in professional snooker history and World Seniors Championship title ===
In the 2025-26 snooker season, O'Sullivan became the first player to score two maximum breaks in a single session match. He achieved the feat in a semi-final tie against Chris Wakelin at the Saudi Arabia Masters. He also became the oldest player to record a 147 break in competition. He was then defeated 9–10 by Neil Robertson in the final. At the UK Championship, O'Sullivan exited after a first-round defeat to Zhou Yuelong. In January 2026, he withdrew from the Masters on health grounds.

In the quarter-finals of the 2026 World Open, O'Sullivan made a 16-red clearance of 153, the highest professional break of all time. It was the second time in history that a break exceeding 147 had been made in professional play, with Jamie Burnett making a 148 in the qualifying rounds of the 2004 UK Championship. O'Sullivan went on to reach the final but was defeated 7–10 by Un-Nooh. In the second round of the 2026 World Championship, O'Sullivan led Higgins 9–4 before eventually losing in a final-frame decider.

Although O'Sullivan did not win any World Snooker Tour events for a second consecutive season, he captured three titles inside six weeks outside of the main circuit. On 12 April 2026, he won the John Virgo Trophy, an invitational tournament played under Snooker 900 rules, defeating Higgins 6‍–‍0 in the final. At the 2026 World Seniors Championship O'Sullivan, making his debut at seniors level, went on to win the title by defeating Joe Perry 10–4 in the final. One week after winning the World Seniors title, O'Sullivan beat Luca Brecel 10–5 in the final to win the inaugural Snooker 900 Global Championship.
