= State Circus Park =

Park in Bucharest, Romania

- Parcul Circului de Stat
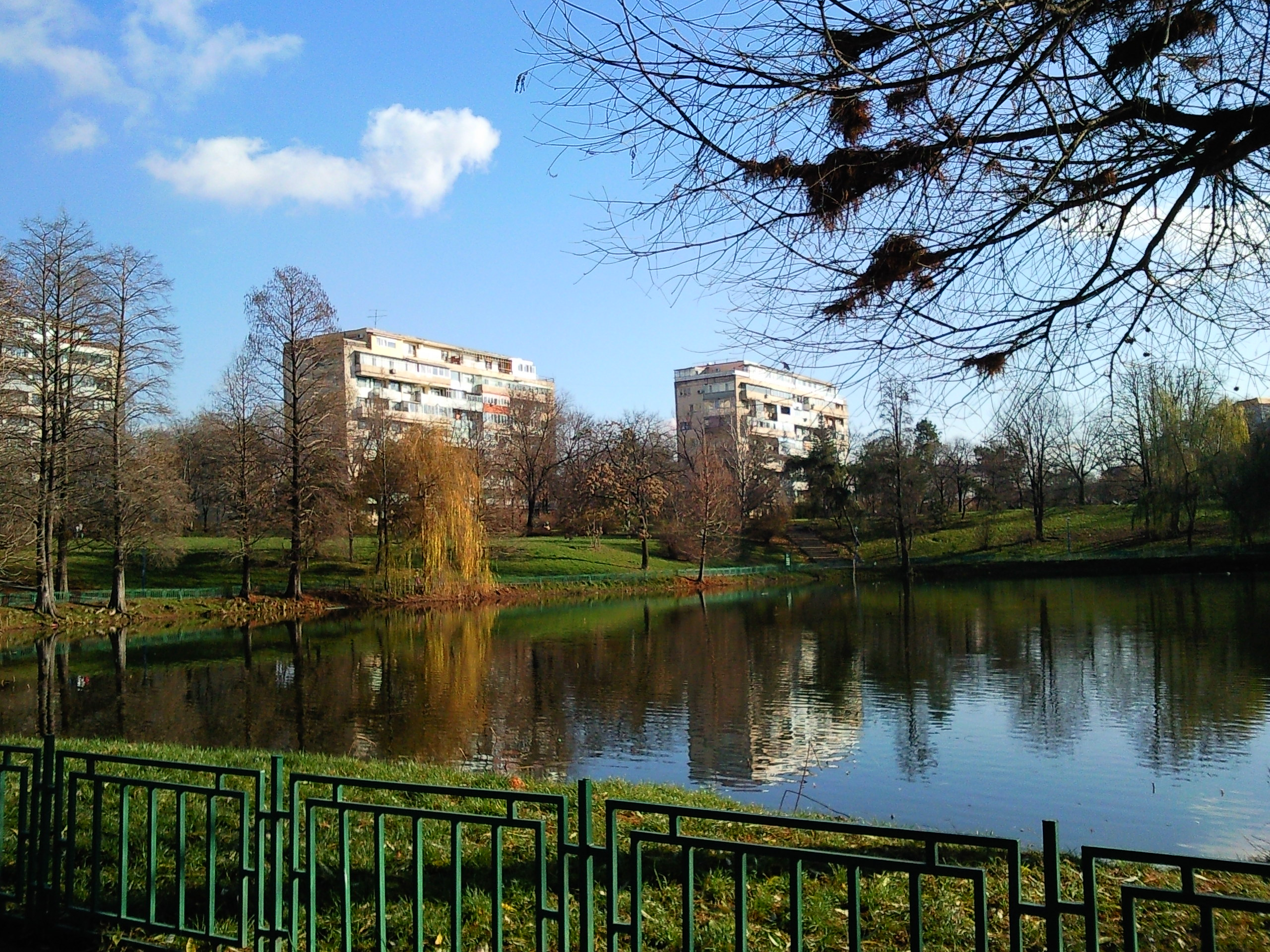
- Interactive map of State Circus Park
- Location: Bucharest, Romania
- Coordinates: 44°27′27″N 26°6′36″E

The State Circus Park (Romanian: Parcul Circului de Stat) is a park in Sector 2 of Bucharest, Romania, which hosts the Bucharest Metropolitan Circus. The design of the park was laid out in 1961, on an area of 26 hectacres, following the plans of architect Valentin Donose.

The water level of the small lake at the center of the park had significantly dropped by 2022, affecting the local fauna (fish, wild ducks, turtles, etc.). Nicuşor Dan, at the time serving as Mayor of Bucharest, attributed the drop to newly built high-rise buildings which had reportedly affected the springs that fed the lake.

In recent years, an irrigation system has been built to maintain the park's flora, and over 20,000 trees and shrubs have been planted. The Bucharest Lakes, Parks and Recreation Administration, the park's administrator, has restored the alleys and modernized the entire public lighting system in the park. The total amount invested by the City Hall of the Capital for the park's modernization was approximately €1 million.

== Images ==
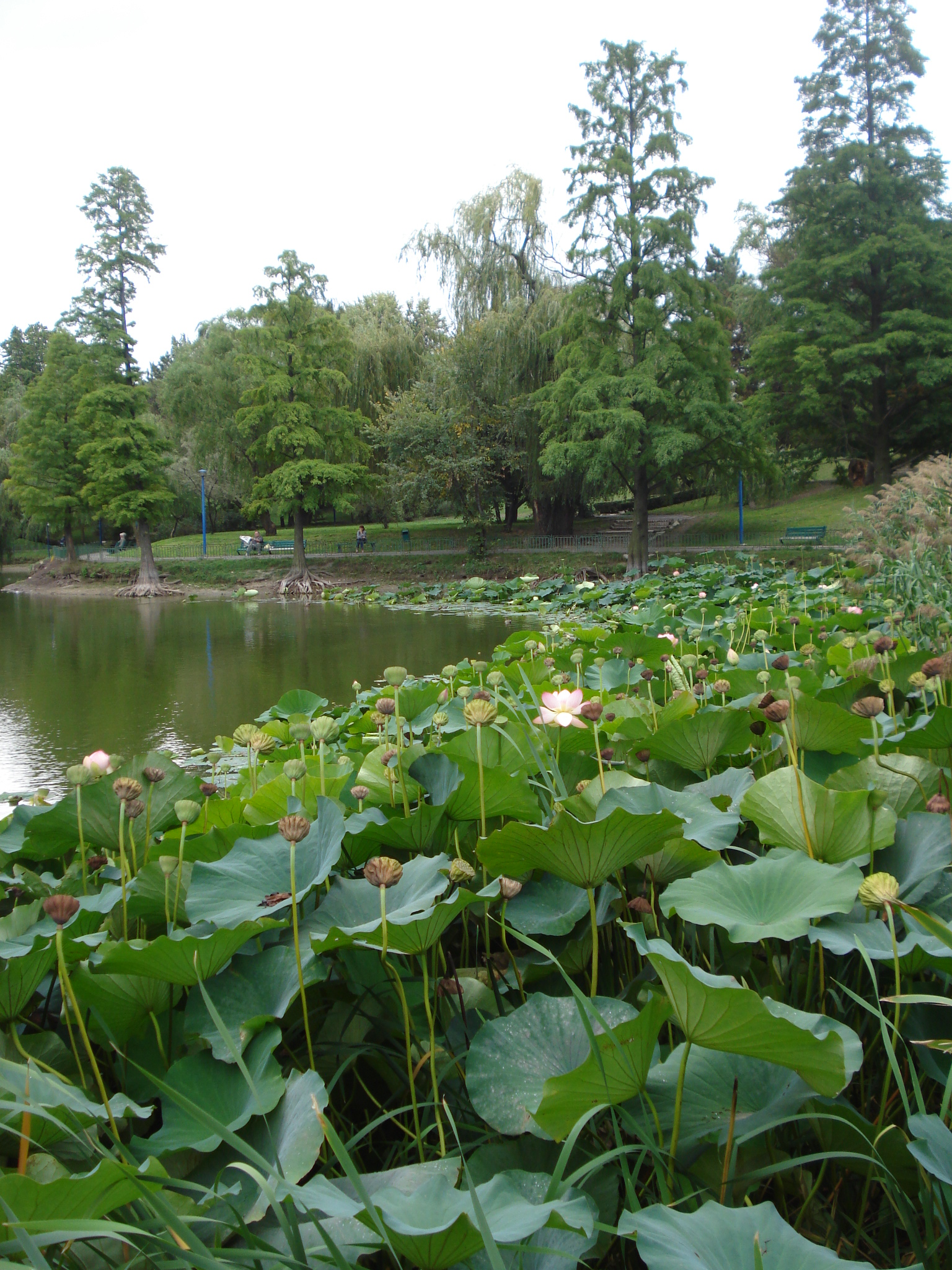
The lake with natural springs and Egyptian lotuses

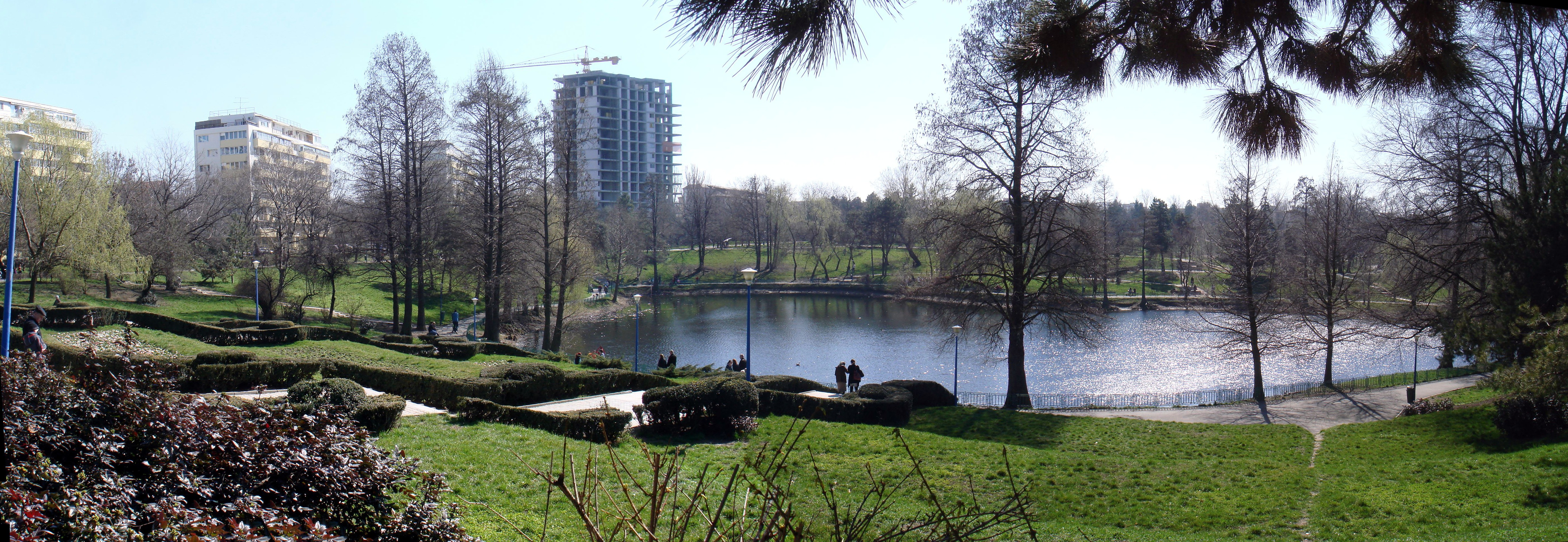
Circus Park with the lake, seen from the entrance from Lacul Tei Blvd.
