= 2016 European Masters =

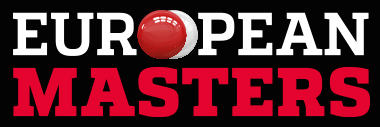

Tournament information
- Dates: 3–9 October 2016
- Venue: Globus Circus
- City: Bucharest
- Country: Romania
- Organisation: World Snooker
- Format: Ranking event
- Total prize fund: €350,000
- Winner's share: €75,000
- Highest break: Shaun Murphy (ENG) (147)

Final
- Champion: Judd Trump (ENG)
- Runner-up: Ronnie O'Sullivan (ENG)
- Score: 9–8

The 2016 European Masters was a professional ranking snooker tournament that took place between 3–9 October 2016 at the Globus Circus in Bucharest, Romania. It was the sixth ranking event of the 2016/2017 season.

Shaun Murphy made the 121st official maximum break in the second frame of his round two qualifying match against Allan Taylor. It was Murphy's fifth professional maximum break.

11 of the world's current top 16 players qualified for the main stages in Bucharest. Stuart Bingham, Mark Williams, Joe Perry and Kyren Wilson lost in the qualifying rounds in Preston, while new Shanghai Masters champion Ding Junhui withdrew. Former professional Zak Surety and Daniel Womersley were the only two amateur players to qualify.

Judd Trump won the event by defeating Ronnie O'Sullivan 9–8 in the final. This was Trump's sixth ranking title. Trump made three centuries in the final, the third one being his 400th career century.

== Prize fund ==
The breakdown of prize money from this year is shown below:

- Winner: €75,000
- Runner-up: €35,000
- Semi-final: €17,500
- Quarter-final: €11,000
- Last 16: €6,000
- Last 32: €3,500
- Last 64: €1,750
- Non-televised highest break: £200
- Televised highest break: £2,000
- Total: €350,000

The "rolling 147 prize" for a maximum break stood at £5,000 for the televised stage and at £11,000 for the qualifiers.

== Main draw ==
Last 32; Best of 7 frames
(England) Mark Selby	4
(Wales) Dominic Dale	2
(England) Barry Hawkins	4
(England) Michael Wild	3
(England) Alfie Burden	4
(China) Yu Delu	1
(China) Yan Bingtao	2
(England) Ricky Walden	4
(Scotland) John Higgins	4
(England) Michael Holt	0
(Finland) Robin Hull	1
(England) Tom Ford	4
(England) Andrew Higginson	4
(Hong Kong) Marco Fu	0
(England) Ben Woollaston	3
(England) Judd Trump	4
(England) Shaun Murphy	1
(England) Mark Davis	4
(England) Zak Surety	1
(China) Liang Wenbo	4
(England) David Gilbert	1
(England) Ronnie O'Sullivan	4
(England) Daniel Womersley	0
(Northern Ireland) Mark Allen	4
(Australia) Neil Robertson	4
(Scotland) Graeme Dott	2
(England) David Grace	1
(Scotland) Rhys Clark	4
(Scotland) Anthony McGill	4
(England) Ali Carter	3
(Belgium) Luca Brecel	3
(Scotland) Scott Donaldson	4

Last 16; Best of 7 frames
(England) Mark Selby	4
(England) Barry Hawkins	0
(England) Alfie Burden	4
(England) Ricky Walden	3
(Scotland) John Higgins	4
(England) Tom Ford	3
(England) Andrew Higginson	0
(England) Judd Trump	4
(England) Mark Davis	4
(China) Liang Wenbo	3
(England) Ronnie O'Sullivan	4
(Northern Ireland) Mark Allen	2
(Australia) Neil Robertson	4
(Scotland) Rhys Clark	1
(Scotland) Anthony McGill	4
(Scotland) Scott Donaldson	3

Quarter-finals; Best of 7 frames
(England) Mark Selby	4
(England) Alfie Burden	0
(Scotland) John Higgins	0
(England) Judd Trump	4
(England) Mark Davis	1
(England) Ronnie O'Sullivan	4
(Australia) Neil Robertson	4
(Scotland) Anthony McGill	2

Semi-finals; Best of 11 frames
(England) Mark Selby	2
(England) Judd Trump	6
(England) Ronnie O'Sullivan	6
(Australia) Neil Robertson	0

Final; Best of 17 frames
(England) Judd Trump	9
(England) Ronnie O'Sullivan	8

== Final ==
Final: Best of 17 frames. Referee: Marcel Eckardt. Globus Circus, Bucharest, Romania, 9 October 2016.
Judd Trump; England	9–8	Ronnie O'Sullivan; England
Afternoon: 51–58, 74–0, 35–62 (53), 45–69 (62), 120–0 (120), 20–100 (59), 82–0 (82), 0–100 (55); Evening: 83–4, 105–21 (105), 67–1 (67), 34–93 (93), 7–72 (72), 42–75, 113–5 (109), 82–6, 74–5 (74)
120	Highest break	93
3	Century breaks	0
6	50+ breaks	6

=== Gallery ===
European Masters Gallery | 2016 European Masters Final

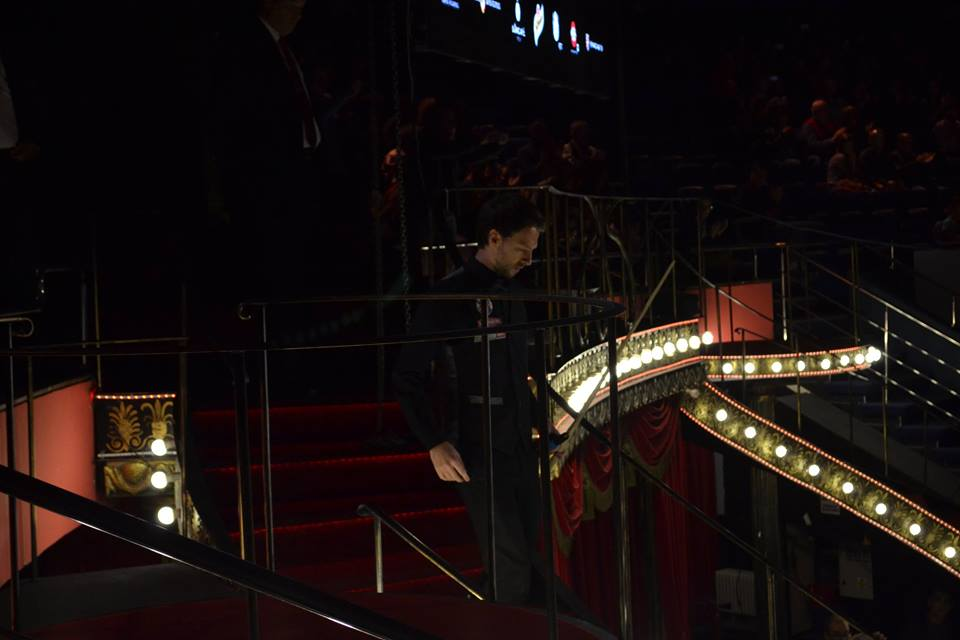

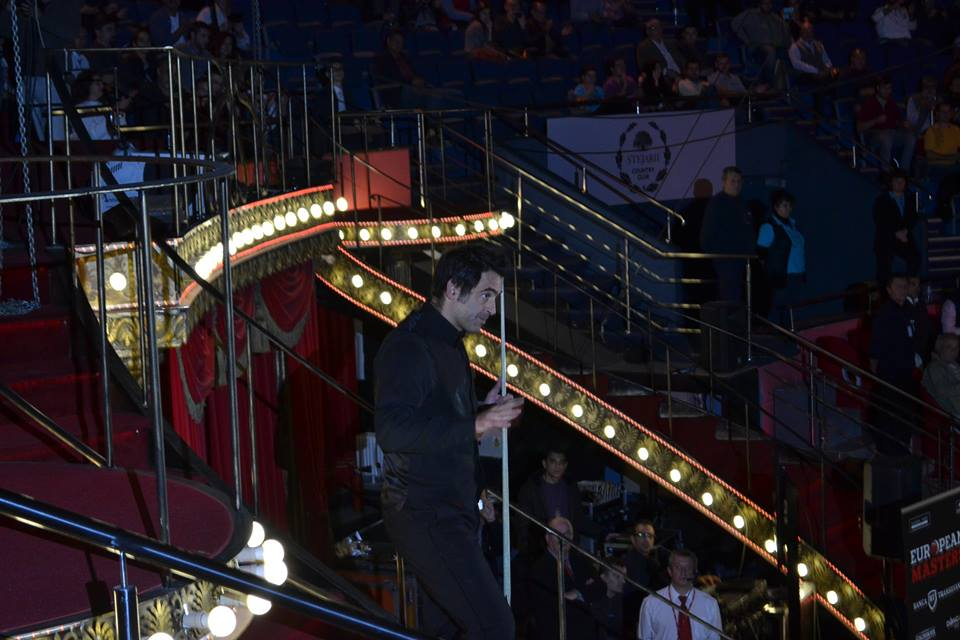

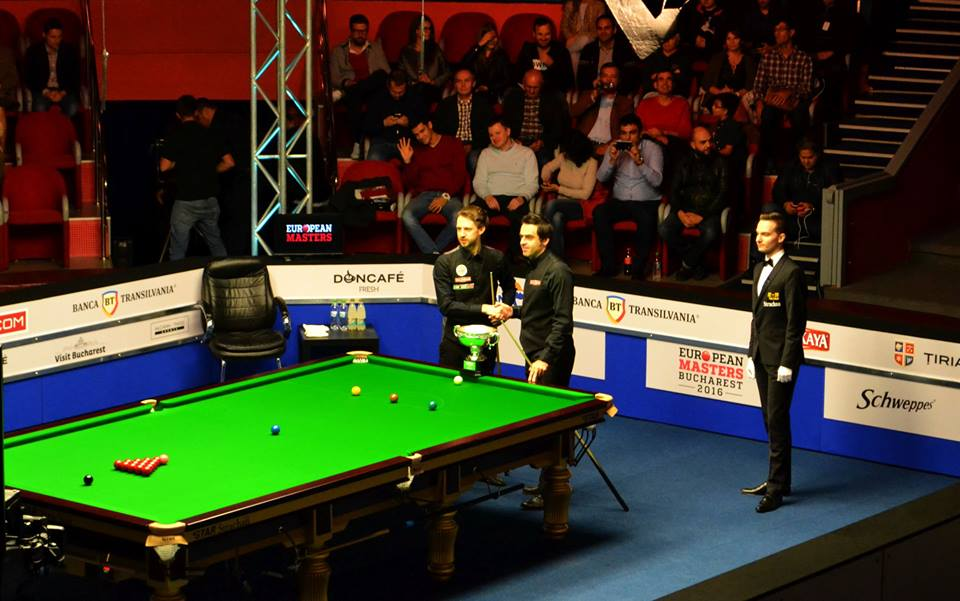

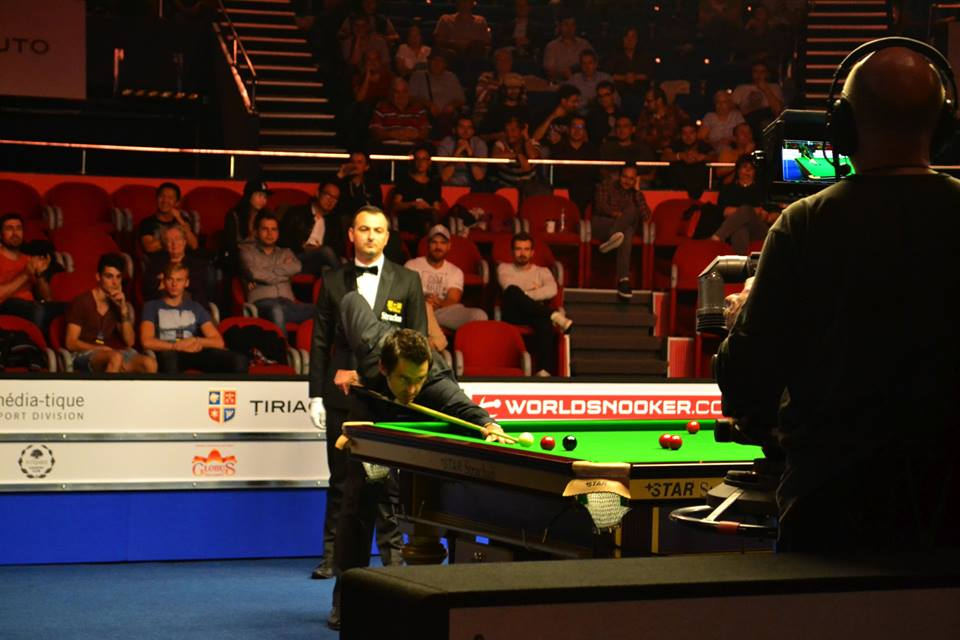

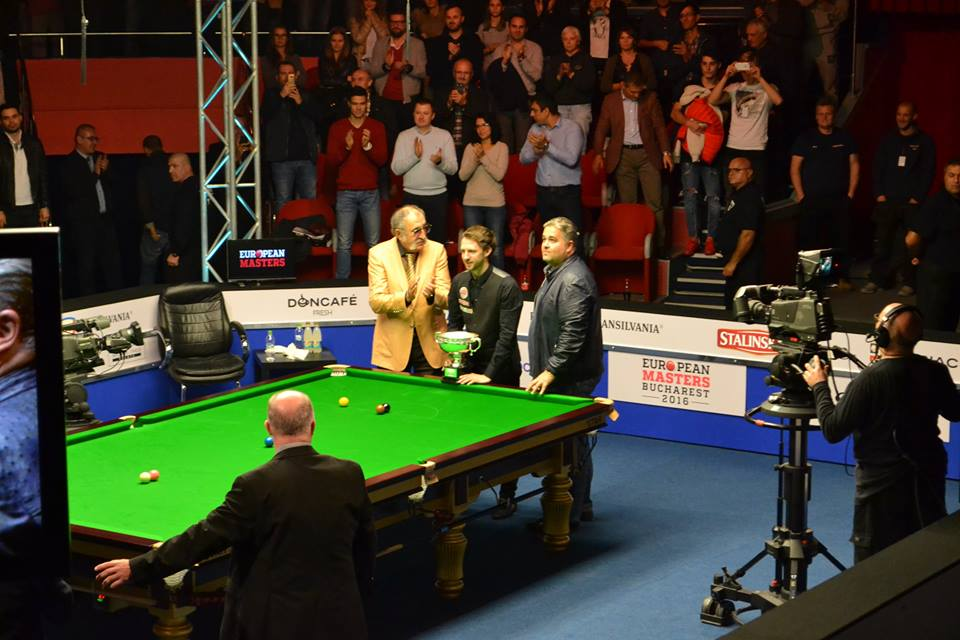

== Qualifying ==
These matches were held between 26 and 28 September 2016 at the Preston Guild Hall in Preston, England. All matches were best of 7 frames.

=== Round 1 ===
(England) Mark Selby	4–1	(England) John Astley
(Thailand) Dechawat Poomjaeng	1–4	(Republic of Ireland) Fergal O'Brien
(England) Peter Ebdon	4–0	(England) Jamie Cope
(Wales) Dominic Dale	4–1	(Malaysia) Thor Chuan Leong
(England) Barry Hawkins	4–0	(China) Zhang Anda
(Thailand) Noppon Saengkham	2–4	(England) Rod Lawler
(England) Martin Gould	2–4	(Wales) Jamie Jones
(China) Cao Yupeng	3–4	(England) Michael Wild
(Pakistan) Hamza Akbar	1–4	(England) Alfie Burden
(Wales) Ryan Day	4–3	(England) James Cahill
(England) Sam Baird	1–4	(China) Zhao Xintong
(China) Ding Junhui	w/d–w/o	(China) Yu Delu
(China) Tian Pengfei	0–4	(China) Yan Bingtao
(Scotland) Alan McManus	3–4	(England) Ian Burns
(England) Sean O'Sullivan	1–4	(Cyprus) Michael Georgiou
(England) Ricky Walden	4–1	(England) Christopher Keogan
(Scotland) John Higgins	4–1	(England) Nigel Bond
(China) Chen Zhe	0–4	(England) Jimmy Robertson
(England) Michael Holt	4–1	(Scotland) Fraser Patrick
(England) Jason Weston	1–4	(Norway) Kurt Maflin
(Wales) Mark Williams	1–4	(Finland) Robin Hull
(England) Gary Wilson	4–1	(England) Sydney Wilson
(Wales) Michael White	3–4	(England) Rory McLeod
(China) Li Hang	2–4	(England) Tom Ford
(England) Ashley Hugill	4–1	(England) Mitchell Mann
(Scotland) Stephen Maguire	3–4	(England) Andrew Higginson
(Australia) Kurt Dunham	0–4	(China) Mei Xiwen
(Hong Kong) Marco Fu	4–0	(England) Steven Hallworth
(England) Louis Heathcote	2–4	(Northern Ireland) Joe Swail
(England) Ben Woollaston	4–2	(Scotland) Ross Muir
(England) Anthony Hamilton	3–4	(Wales) Duane Jones
(England) Judd Trump	4–3	(India) Aditya Mehta

(England) Shaun Murphy	4–3	(China) Fang Xiongman
(Thailand) Kritsanut Lertsattayathorn	2–4	(England) Allan Taylor
(England) Mark Davis	4–1	(England) Paul Davison
(England) Adam Duffy	4–0	(Wales) Gareth Allen
(England) Kyren Wilson	2–4	(England) Zak Surety
(England) Antony Parsons	4–0	(Thailand) James Wattana
(China) Liang Wenbo	4–3	(England) Mark King
(Republic of Ireland) Josh Boileau	4–2	(England) Jimmy White
(England) Jack Lisowski	4–2	(England) Mike Dunn
(England) David Gilbert	4–3	(Wales) Lee Walker
(Wales) Daniel Wells	4–3	(England) Sanderson Lam
(England) Ronnie O'Sullivan	4–1	(China) Lü Chenwei
(Iran) Hossein Vafaei	w/d–w/o	(England) Daniel Womersley
(England) Robert Milkins	2–4	(England) Elliot Slessor
(England) Hammad Miah	4–1	(England) Robbie Williams
(Northern Ireland) Mark Allen	4–0	(Isle of Man) Darryl Hill
(Australia) Neil Robertson	4–1	(Thailand) Boonyarit Keattikun
(England) Oliver Lines	4–2	(England) Brandon Sargeant
(Scotland) Graeme Dott	4–0	(England) Andy Hicks
(England) Mark Joyce	4–2	(Scotland) Eden Sharav
(England) Joe Perry	3–4	(England) David Grace
(Malta) Tony Drago	w/d–w/o	(Wales) Jak Jones
(England) Matthew Selt	2–4	(England) Peter Lines
(Malta) Alex Borg	1–4	(Scotland) Rhys Clark
(England) Stuart Carrington	2–4	(England) Sam Craigie
(Scotland) Anthony McGill	4–3	(Thailand) Sunny Akani
(China) Zhang Yong	0–4	(Wales) Matthew Stevens
(England) Ali Carter	4–2	(Republic of Ireland) Ken Doherty
(Wales) David John	4–0	(England) Bradley Jones
(Belgium) Luca Brecel	4–1	(China) Zhou Yuelong
(England) Chris Wakelin	0–4	(Scotland) Scott Donaldson
(England) Stuart Bingham	4–0	(England) Craig Steadman

=== Round 2 ===
(England) Mark Selby	4–0 (Note: Match was held over and played in Bucharest.)	(Republic of Ireland) Fergal O'Brien
(England) Peter Ebdon	3–4	(Wales) Dominic Dale
(England) Barry Hawkins	4–1	(England) Rod Lawler
(Wales) Jamie Jones	3–4	(England) Michael Wild
(England) Alfie Burden	4–3	(Wales) Ryan Day
(China) Zhao Xintong	3–4	(China) Yu Delu
(China) Yan Bingtao	4–1	(England) Ian Burns
(Cyprus) Michael Georgiou	1–4	(England) Ricky Walden
(Scotland) John Higgins	4–3	(England) Jimmy Robertson
(England) Michael Holt	4–0	(Norway) Kurt Maflin
(Finland) Robin Hull	4–3	(England) Gary Wilson
(England) Rory McLeod	2–4	(England) Tom Ford
(England) Ashley Hugill	1–4	(England) Andrew Higginson
(China) Mei Xiwen	2–4	(Hong Kong) Marco Fu
(Northern Ireland) Joe Swail	1–4	(England) Ben Woollaston
(Wales) Duane Jones	2–4	(England) Judd Trump

(England) Shaun Murphy	4–0	(England) Allan Taylor
(England) Mark Davis	4–0	(England) Adam Duffy
(England) Zak Surety	4–1	(England) Antony Parsons
(China) Liang Wenbo	4–2	(Republic of Ireland) Josh Boileau
(England) Jack Lisowski	1–4	(England) David Gilbert
(Wales) Daniel Wells	0–4	(England) Ronnie O'Sullivan
(England) Daniel Womersley	4–3	(England) Elliot Slessor
(England) Hammad Miah	0–4	(Northern Ireland) Mark Allen
(Australia) Neil Robertson	4–1	(England) Oliver Lines
(Scotland) Graeme Dott	4–3	(England) Mark Joyce
(England) David Grace	4–2	(Wales) Jak Jones
(England) Peter Lines	3–4	(Scotland) Rhys Clark
(England) Sam Craigie	0–4	(Scotland) Anthony McGill
(Wales) Matthew Stevens	3–4	(England) Ali Carter
(Wales) David John	2–4	(Belgium) Luca Brecel
(Scotland) Scott Donaldson	4–3	(England) Stuart Bingham

== Century breaks ==
=== Qualifying stage centuries ===
- 147 – Shaun Murphy
- 143, 136 – Marco Fu
- 143 – Neil Robertson
- 133 – Mei Xiwen
- 128, 117 – Ricky Walden
- 128 – Michael White
- 128 – Boonyarit Keattikun
- 127 – Jimmy Robertson
- 127 – Gary Wilson
- 125, 116, 100 – Mark Davis
- 123, 100 – Robin Hull
- 123 – Stephen Maguire
- 122 – Mitchell Mann
- 114 – Judd Trump
- 113 – John Higgins
- 113 – David Grace
- 112, 109 – Mark Joyce
- 108 – Liang Wenbo
- 108 – Dominic Dale
- 106 – Mark King
- 104, 101 – Michael Holt
- 104 – Alfie Burden
- 104 – Duane Jones
- 103 – Aditya Mehta
- 103 – Mark Selby
- 103 – Ryan Day
- 102 – Fergal O'Brien
- 102 – Mark Allen
- 102 – Antony Parsons
- 101 – David Gilbert
- 101 – Daniel Wells
- 101 – Tom Ford
- 100 – Matthew Selt

=== Televised stage centuries ===
- 136, 109, 102 – Mark Selby
- 135, 120, 118, 109, 105, 105, 105 – Judd Trump
- 129, 118 – Ronnie O'Sullivan
- 124, 107, 100 – Mark Davis
- 121, 112 – Mark Allen
- 118, 104 – John Higgins
- 112, 103 – Neil Robertson
- 107 – Anthony McGill
- 105 – Ricky Walden
- 103 – Liang Wenbo
- 101 – Rhys Clark
