= 2026 John Virgo Trophy =

Snooker tournament

The 2026 John Virgo Trophy was a two-day invitational event held as a tribute to snooker player John Virgo, who died on 4 February 2026. It took place at the Goffs venue in County Kildare, Ireland, on 11 and 12 April 2026. The tournament was contested by invited multiple World Championship winners Ronnie O'Sullivan, John Higgins, Mark Williams, and Stephen Hendry, under the Snooker 900 rules, a fast-paced format designed mainly for television. O'Sullivan won the event, defeating Higgins 6‍–‍0 in the final.

== Results ==
Semi-finals; Best of 11 frames
(Scotland) John Higgins	6
(Wales) Mark Williams	4
(England) Ronnie O'Sullivan	6
(Scotland) Stephen Hendry	1

Final; Best of 11 frames
(Scotland) John Higgins	0
(England) Ronnie O'Sullivan	6

=== Final ===
Final
Final: Best of 11 frames. Referee: Michaela Tabb; Goffs, County Kildare, Ireland, 12 April 2026.
John Higgins; Scotland	0–6	Ronnie O'Sullivan; England
Frame scores: 0–125 (125), 18–75 (75), 42–81 (65), 0–96 (96), 12–78 (73), 28–64,
	Highest break	125 (frame 1)
0	Century breaks	1
