= Snooker 900 =

Snooker tournament

- Sport: Snooker
- Founded: 2023
- Owner: Snooker Legends
- CEO: Jason Francis
- Country: England
- Venue: Reading, Berkshire
- Broadcaster: 5 (United Kingdom)
- Streaming partner: Pluto TV
- Related competitions: World Seniors Tour
- Website: snooker900.tv

Snooker 900 is a tournament format featuring a fast-paced variation of snooker with special rules. It is broadly based on the Snooker Shoot Out.

== History ==
In 2023, Jason Francis, the chairman of World Seniors Snooker at the time, wanted to provide extra televised events for the seniors tour other than the World Seniors Snooker Championship; liking the concept of the Snooker Shoot Out, he decided to create a shoot-out style event with an extended frame time of fifteen minutes instead of ten minutes while all of the other rules of the Snooker Shoot Out were maintained. It was later branded as Snooker 900, with the 900 referring to the time limit in seconds of the format.

The format were initially adopted for legends and seniors events, and the first invitational event featuring top professional players from the World Snooker Tour was not held until late 2025. Partnership with the streaming platform Pluto TV was also announced in 2025 to provide dedicated coverage of all Snooker 900 events, in a bid to raise recognition of the invitational series as an alternative outside of the World Snooker Tour.

== Format ==
Designed for fast-paced action rather than the traditional game of snooker in which frames often advance slowly through safety shots, snookers, and penalties, the rules are based on tightly timed frames and player shots.

- A frame is played with a full set of standard snooker balls, reds and colours, but with a red spotted white cueball.
- Frames are limited to a duration of 15 minutes - 900 seconds, from which the snooker variation takes its name, and similar to Snooker Shoot Out, the frame is won on the number of points scored when the frame times out.
- A shot-clock throughout the frame allows each player a maximum of 20 seconds to take their shot.
- A ball must be potted or at least one object ball/cue ball must hit a cushion, failing which the shot is a foul.
- Following a foul, the next player may place the cueball (ball-in-hand) anywhere on the table.

== Tournaments and winners ==
=== World Seniors Snooker 900 ===
The inaugural 900 event, held in conjunction with the World Seniors Tour, was held on 29 December 2023 at Epsom Racecourse and featured six players. Following group round robin matches and semi-finals, Stephen Hendry defeated Jimmy White 1–0 in the final.. On 2 March 2024, Ken Doherty defeated Jimmy White 2–1 in Goffs, Ireland to win the second 900 title. In the following season, two more events were staged. On 8 September 2024, Igor Figueiredo defeated Jimmy White 2–1 in Hull, and on 30 December 2024, Ken Doherty defeated Tony Drago 2–1 to claim his second World Seniors Snooker 900 title.

=== Standalone tournaments ===
==== Crucible Cup ====
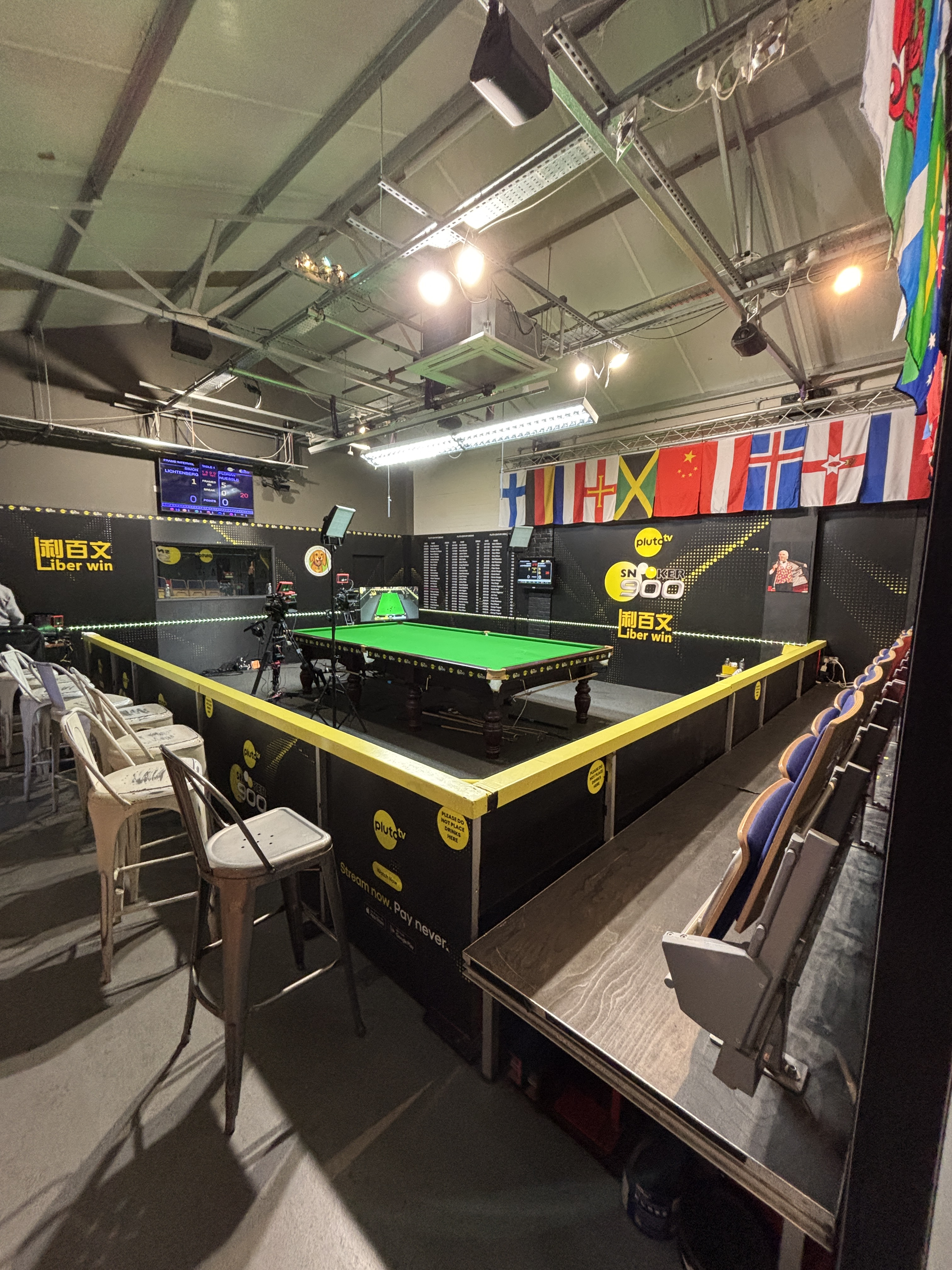
Snooker 900 arena at the Crucible Sports and Social Club, Reading

The Crucible Cup was an inaugural event that took place on November 24 and 25 November 2025 at Snooker 900's home base at the Crucible Sports and Social Club in Reading, with the name being a tribute to the Crucible Theatre, the venue for the Snooker World Championship. The format is a straight knockout with the quarter-finals and semi-finals being the best of 11 frames, with 13 frames for the final.

==== Champions Week ====
Jimmy White won the Champions Week title in the Snooker 900 series, which ran from 23–25 March 2026 defeating twelve times women's snooker world champion Reanne Evans 5-3..

==== John Virgo Trophy ====
The John Virgo Trophy was an invitational tournament played using Snooker 900 rules on 11–12 April 2026 at the Goffs venue in County Kildare, Ireland as a tribute to professional snooker player, pundit, and commentator John Virgo who died in February 2026. The tournament consisted of three of the "Class of '92" players Ronnie O'Sullivan, John Higgins, Mark Williams and seven time World Champion Stephen Hendry. O'Sullivan who was competing in a 900 event for the first time won the tournament by defeating John Higgins 6-0 in the final.

==== Global Championship ====
Ronnie O'Sullivan won the first staging of the tournament defeating Luca Brecel 10–5 in the final. The tournament featured other world champions Kyren Wilson, Shaun Murphy, Stuart Bingham and Ken Doherty along with senior players, Joe Perry, and Jimmy White, the first Global Snooker 900 Championship took place between May 12-17 2026 in Reading. The championship features 20 players competing for a £100,000 prize fund, and includes a qualifying junior under the age of 18.

== Broadcasting ==
Channel 5 in the UK televised four World Seniors Tour events in 900 format between 2023 and 2024. In April 2026 Pluto TV and 5 in the UK both showed live coverage of the inaugural John Virgo Trophy.

Pluto TV Snooker 900, a TV channel dedicated exclusively to Snooker 900, started broadcasting on 6 October 2025. It offers 18 hours a week of content exclusively on Pluto TV, and also includes excerpts from archived matches and O'Sullivan's 'Rocket Method' coaching series. The channel was initially broadcasting to the UK, Austria, Canada, Denmark, Finland, Germany, Norway, Sweden and Switzerland. In November 2025 broadcasting was extended to France, Italy and Spain.

Snooker 900 competitions are generally broadcast from its home base at the Crucible Sports and Social Club in Reading, Berkshire, England.

== See also ==
- Snooker Shoot Out
- Glossary of cue sports terms
