= Bucharest Metropolitan Circus =

Coordinates: 44°27′24″N 26°06′34″E

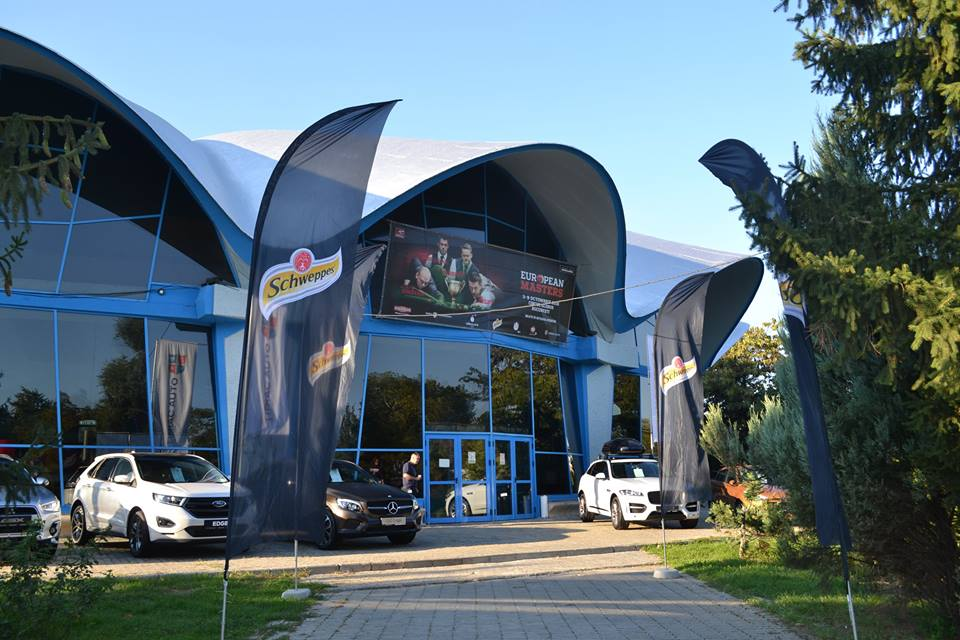
Bucharest Metropolitan Circus

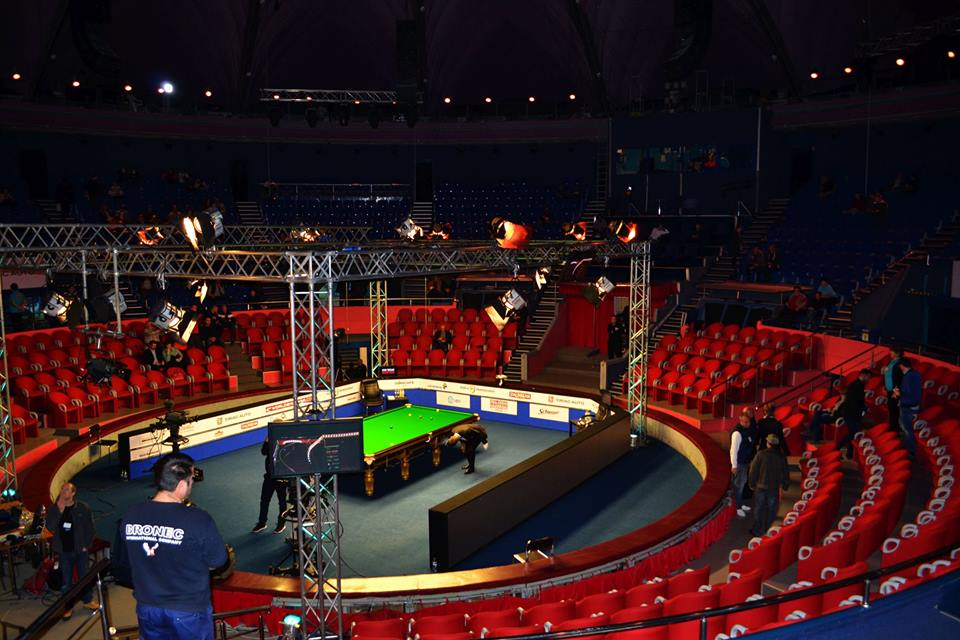
Inside the arena

The Bucharest Metropolitan Circus (Romanian: Circul Metropolitan București), also known as Bucharest State Circus, or Globus Circus, is a circus located at 15 Circului Alley in Bucharest, Romania.

Built in 1960-1961 by architects Nicolae Porumbescu, Nicolae Pruncu and Constantin Ruleahe, the circus is listed in the National Register of Historic Monuments in Romania. It has a capacity of up to 1,850 seats.
