= 2024 Shanghai Masters =

2024 invitational snooker tournament

Tournament information
- Dates: 15–21 July 2024
- Venue: Shanghai Indoor Stadium
- City: Shanghai
- Country: China
- Organisation: World Snooker Tour
- Format: Non-ranking event
- Total prize fund: £825,000
- Winner's share: £210,000
- Highest break: Barry Hawkins (ENG) (141)

Final
- Champion: Judd Trump (ENG)
- Runner-up: Shaun Murphy (ENG)
- Score: 11–5

The 2024 Shanghai Masters was a professional non-ranking snooker tournament that took place in the Shanghai Indoor Stadium in Shanghai, China from 15 to 21 July 2024. The 15th edition of the Shanghai Masters, first held in 2007, it was the fourth edition since the tournament became an invitational event in 2018. It featured 24 players, the top 16 players in the world rankings, as they stood after the 2024 Championship League, and eight invited Chinese players. The tournament was broadcast by local channels in China, Thailand and Hong Kong, by Eurosport and Discovery+ in Europe, and by Matchroom Sport in all other territories. The winner received £210,000 from a total prize fund of £825,000.

The defending champion was Ronnie O'Sullivan, who had defeated Luca Brecel 11‍–‍9 in the 2023 final to win his fifth Shanghai Masters title, and his fourth consecutively. O'Sullivan lost 3–10 in the semi-finals to Judd Trump, who went on to defeat Shaun Murphy 11‍–‍5 in the final, winning the title for the first time.

== Overview ==
The inaugural 2007 Shanghai Masters was won by Dominic Dale, who trailed 2‍–‍6 in the final against Ryan Day, only to win eight consecutive frames for a 10‍–‍6 victory. Staged as a ranking event from 2007 to 2017, the Shanghai Masters in 2018 became a non-ranking invitational event comprising 24 players. Ronnie O'Sullivan is the tournament's most successful player to date, having won five previous titles in 2009, 2017, 2018, 2019, and 2023. The only other player to claim the title more than once is Ding Junhui, who won in 2013 and 2016.

The 2024 edition featured the top 16 players in the world rankings as they stood after the 2024 Championship League, the four highest-ranked Chinese players outside the top 16 (Si Jiahui, Zhou Yuelong, Pang Junxu, and Lyu Haotian), and four Chinese wildcard players (Cao Jin, Qiu Lei, Wang Xinbo, and Zhou Jinhao). O'Sullivan was the defending champion, having won the 2023 edition of the tournament with an 11‍–‍9 victory over Luca Brecel. Judd Trump defeated O'Sullivan 10‍–‍3 in the semi-final, and went on to win the tournament by beating Shaun Murphy 11‍–‍5 in the final.

== Format ==
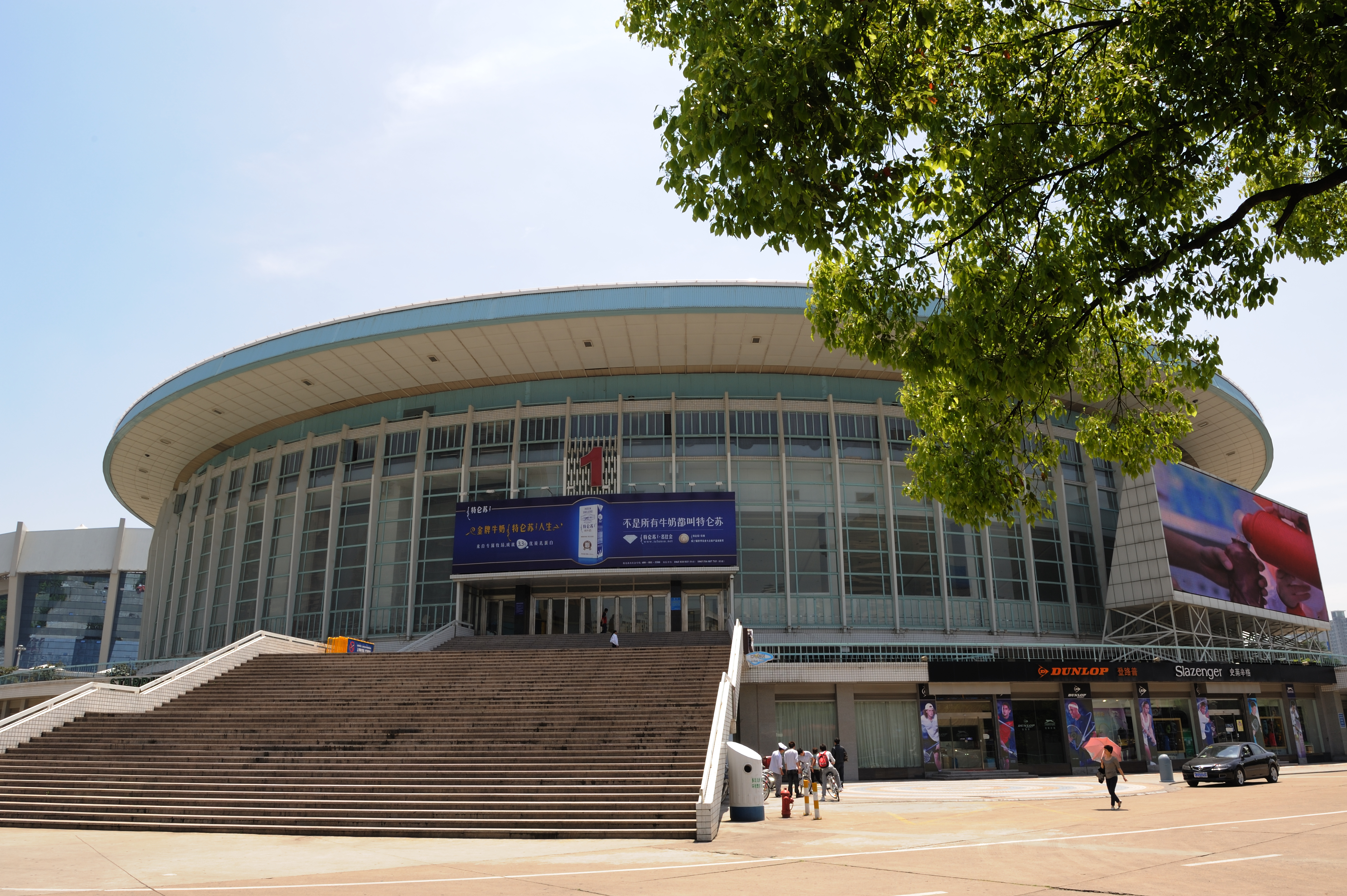
The tournament venue, the Shanghai Indoor Stadium in Shanghai, China.

The tournament took place at the Shanghai Indoor Stadium in Shanghai, China from 15 to 21 July 2024. Matches were played as the best of 11 frames, except for the semi-finals, which were the best of 19 frames, and the final, which was the best of 21 frames. Players were seeded in the tournament by their world ranking following the 2024 Championship League, with the defending champion (O'Sullivan) seeded one and the reigning World Champion (Kyren Wilson) seeded two, so that the top ranked player (Mark Allen) was seeded three. The top eight seeded players received byes to the second round. Each invited Chinese player faced one of the players seeded 9‍–‍16 in the first round.

The tournament was broadcast by local channels in China, Thailand, and Hong Kong, by Eurosport and Discovery+ in Europe, and by Matchroom Sport in all other territories.

=== Wildcard players ===
The co-organiser of the tournament, the Chinese Billiards and Snooker Association (CBSA), has two nominated places for the top domestically ranked players and another two wildcards for the finalists of an open qualifier event. The qualifier was held at the CITIC Square on 28th June.

=== Prize fund ===
The total prize fund was £825,000, with the winner receiving £210,000. The breakdown of prize money is shown below:

- Winner: £210,000
- Runner-up: £105,000
- Semi-final: £70,000
- Quarter-final: £35,000
- Last 16: £17,500
- Last 24: £10,000
- Highest break: £10,000
- Total: £825,000

== Summary ==
=== Early rounds ===
==== First round ====
First-round matches took place on 15 and 16 July, featuring eight Chinese invitees against players seeded nine through 16. On the opening day Ali Carter whitewashed Chinese wildcard Qiu Lei 6‍–‍0, wildcard Zhou Jinhao defeated Zhang Anda 6‍–‍3, and Mark Williams beat wildcard Wang Xinbo 6‍–‍3. Si Jiahui beat Tom Ford 6‍–‍3, making a 131 break, the first century break of the tournament. John Higgins defeated Lyu Haotian 6‍–‍1, making two centuries. Zhou Yuelong defeated Barry Hawkins 6‍–‍4, with three century breaks. In the remaining two first round matches that were played on the second day, wildcard Cao Jin beat Jak Jones 6‍–‍2, and Pang Junxu defeated Gary Wilson 6‍–‍5, despite Wilson making two centuries.

==== Round of 16 ====
The round of 16 took place on 16 and 17 July, featuring the first-round winners against players seeded one through eight. On 16 July Si Jiahui beat Luca Brecel 6‍–‍2, and Ronnie O'Sullivan defeated Zhou Jinhao 6‍–‍1. Ding Junhui beat Ali Carter 6‍–‍5, although Carter made two centuries. Judd Trump defeated Mark Williams 6‍–‍2, making two century breaks. On 17 July Mark Selby beat Cao Jin 6‍–‍1, and Shaun Murphy defeated John Higgins 6‍–‍3. Kyren Wilson was whitewashed by Zhou Yuelong. Pang Junxu defeated Mark Allen 6‍–‍5 in a match that could not be completed in the afternoon session and was taken off after nine frames to be resumed in the evening session. Allen made two centuries, but Pang won the decider.

=== Later rounds ===
==== Quarter-finals ====
The quarter-finals took place on 18 July. Shaun Murphy beat Zhou Yuelong 6‍–‍2, and Mark Selby defeated Pang Junxu 6‍–‍3 with a 118 break in the ninth frame. Ronnie O'Sullivan beat Ding Junhui 6‍–‍3, and Judd Trump defeated Si Jiahui 6‍–‍2.

==== Semi finals ====
The first semi-final took place over two sessions on 19 July. Shaun Murphy recovered from being 5‍–‍8 behind to take the last five frames and secure a 10‍–‍8 victory over Mark Selby, producing four century breaks.

The second semi-final took place over two sessions on 20 July. Judd Trump defeated the defending champion Ronnie O'Sullivan 10‍–‍3, making four century breaks.

==== Final ====
The final took place over two sessions on 21 July. At the end of the afternoon session, Trump led Murphy 7‍–‍3, making two century breaks, but Murphy took the last two frames of the session, with a 132 break in the tenth frame. Trump went on to win the match 11‍–‍5. After the match Trump said "I want to win as many big tournaments as possible this season. This is probably one of the top five events on the calendar. To win this one early on is an amazing start. I would like to replicate what I did last season and get close to five wins or even more. I couldn't have dreamed of a better start." Murphy said: "In a tournament like this you always have a bad day and unfortunately for me my bad day was today. Every other day this week has been really good. I always keep trying and giving my best. It just wasn't to be."

== Main draw ==
The tournament results for the event are shown below. Numbers in parentheses after the players' names denote their seeding, and players in bold denote match winners.

**Round 1** Best of 11 frames
Zhang Anda (CHN) (12)	3
**Zhou Jinhao (CHN) (w/c)**	**6**
**Ali Carter (ENG) (10)**	**6**
Qiu Lei (CHN) (w/c)	0
Tom Ford (ENG) (13)	3
**Si Jiahui (CHN) (17)**	**6**
**Mark Williams (WAL) (9)**	**6**
Wang Xinbo (CHN) (w/c)	3
Gary Wilson (ENG) (11)	5
**Pang Junxu (CHN) (19)**	**6**
Jak Jones (WAL) (14)	2
**Cao Jin (CHN) (w/c)**	**6**
**John Higgins (SCO) (16)**	**6**
Lyu Haotian (CHN) (20)	1
Barry Hawkins (ENG) (15)	4
**Zhou Yuelong (CHN) (18)**	**6**

**Last 16**; Best of 11 frames
**Ronnie O'Sullivan (ENG) (1)**	**6**
Zhou Jinhao (CHN) (w/c)	1
**Ding Junhui (CHN) (8)**	**6**
Ali Carter (ENG) (10)	5
Luca Brecel (BEL) (5)	2
**Si Jiahui (CHN) (17)**	**6**
**Judd Trump (ENG) (4)**	**6**
Mark Williams (WAL) (9)	2
Mark Allen (NIR) (3)	5
**Pang Junxu (CHN) (19)**	**6**
**Mark Selby (ENG) (6)**	**6**
Cao Jin (CHN) (w/c)	1
**Shaun Murphy (ENG) (7)**	**6**
John Higgins (SCO) (16)	3
Kyren Wilson (ENG) (2)	0
**Zhou Yuelong (CHN) (18)**	**6**

**Quarter-finals**; Best of 11 frames
**Ronnie O'Sullivan (ENG) (1)**	**6**
Ding Junhui (CHN) (8)	3
Si Jiahui (CHN) (17)	2
**Judd Trump (ENG) (4)**	**6**
Pang Junxu (CHN) (19)	3
**Mark Selby (ENG) (6)**	**6**
**Shaun Murphy (ENG) (7)**	**6**
Zhou Yuelong (CHN) (18)	2

**Semi-finals**; Best of 19 frames
Ronnie O'Sullivan (ENG) (1)	3
**Judd Trump (ENG) (4)**	**10**
Mark Selby (ENG) (6)	8
**Shaun Murphy (ENG) (7)**	**10**

**Final**; Best of 21 frames
**Judd Trump (ENG) (4)**	**11**
Shaun Murphy (ENG) (7)	5

Note: w/c = wildcard

=== Final ===
Final: Best of 21 frames. Referee: Zhu Ying; Shanghai Indoor Stadium, Shanghai, China, 21 July 2024
**Judd Trump** (4); England	**11**–5	Shaun Murphy (7); England
Afternoon: **63**–9, **85**–12, 0–**89**, **67**–50, **109**–22 (100), **73**–43, **126**–0 (122), **85**–0, 48–**73**, 0–**132** (132); Evening: **73**–37, **90**–31, **114**–0 (114), 1–**114** (110), 0–**134** (101), **107**–1
(frame 7) 122	Highest break	**132** (frame 10)
3	Century breaks	3

== Century breaks ==
A total of 36 century breaks were made in the tournament.

- 141 – Barry Hawkins
- 140, 134, 132, 116, 110, 104, 101 – Shaun Murphy
- 136, 118, 115 – Mark Selby
- 135, 126 – John Higgins
- 133, 126, 116, 104 – Zhou Yuelong
- 131, 123 – Si Jiahui
- 131 – Ronnie O'Sullivan
- 128, 127, 122, 114, 112, 112, 110, 106, 104, 100 – Judd Trump
- 120, 101 – Mark Allen
- 109, 103 – Gary Wilson
- 107, 100 – Ali Carter
