= 2026 Shanghai Masters =

2026 invitational snooker tournament

Tournament information
- Dates: 27 July – 2 August 2026
- Venue: Luwan Indoor Stadium
- City: Shanghai
- Country: China
- Organisation: World Snooker Tour; CBSA
- Format: Non-ranking event
- Total prize fund: £825,000
- Winner's share: £210,000
- Highest break: Xiao Guodong (CHN) (147)

Final
- Champion: Judd Trump (ENG)
- Runner-up: Kyren Wilson (ENG)
- Score: 11–6

The 2026 Shanghai Masters was a professional non-ranking snooker tournament that took place from 27 July to 2 August 2026 at the Luwan Indoor Stadium in Shanghai, China. Part of the 2026–27 snooker season, it is the 17th edition of the Shanghai Masters since the tournament was first staged in 2007 and the sixth edition since the tournament became an invitational event in 2018. The winner received £210,000 from a total prize fund of £825,000.

Kyren Wilson was the defending champion, having defeated Ali Carter 11–9 in the 2025 final, but he lost 6–11 in the final to Judd Trump.

== Overview ==
The 20th anniversary commemorative logo used for the event

The inaugural 2007 Shanghai Masters was won by Dominic Dale, who trailed 2–6 in the final against Ryan Day, only to win eight consecutive frames for a 10–6 victory. Staged as a ranking event from 2007 to 2017, the Shanghai Masters became a non-ranking invitational event in 2018, comprising 24 players. As of 2026, Ronnie O'Sullivan is the tournament's most successful player, having won the title five times, in 2009, 2017, 2018, 2019, and 2023. Kyren Wilson is the defending champion, having defeated Ali Carter 11–9 in the 2025 final.

The 2026 edition of the tournament—the sixth staging of the tournament since it became an invitational event in 2018—took place from 27 July to 2 August at the Luwan Indoor Stadium in Shanghai, China. It marks the twentieth anniversary since the inaugural Shanghai Masters was held in 2007.

Four Chinese wildcards were entered for the event, Liu Linhao, Tang Hewen, Yao Dongcheng, and Xu Jiarui. All four were eliminated in the first round.

Jack Lisowski was entered in the event as a replacement for Mark Allen

There were 54 century breaks made during the tournament, including a maximum break by Xiao Guodong.

=== Prize fund ===
The prize fund for the tournament is as follows:

- Winner: £210,000
- Runner-up: £105,000
- Semi-final: £70,000
- Quarter-final: £35,000
- Last 16: £17,500
- Last 24: £10,000
- Highest break: £10,000
- Total: £825,000

== Summary ==
=== Round one ===
On the first day Ronnie O'Sullivan beat wildcard Liu Linhao 6–1. O'Sullivan said after the match: "At the start of the game I thought he wasn't very good. He had a couple of chances and missed them. Once he started cueing and potting balls I realised this kid is definitely one for the future. He is a phenomenal cueist. I can't cue the ball like these guys. They are incredible these young Chinese players." Ding Junhui had a 6–2 win over wildcard Yao Dongcheng, making four century breaks of 103, 125, 140 and 108. Zhou Yuelong recovered from 4–5 down to beat Mark Selby 6–5, Xiao Guodong beat wildcard Xu Jiarui 6–5, and Chris Wakelin whitewashed wildcard Tang Hewen. Barry Hawkins beat Lei Peifan 6–4. On the second day Jack Lisowski defeated Zhang Anda 6–4, and Si Jiahui beat Pang Junxu by the same score.

=== Last 16 ===
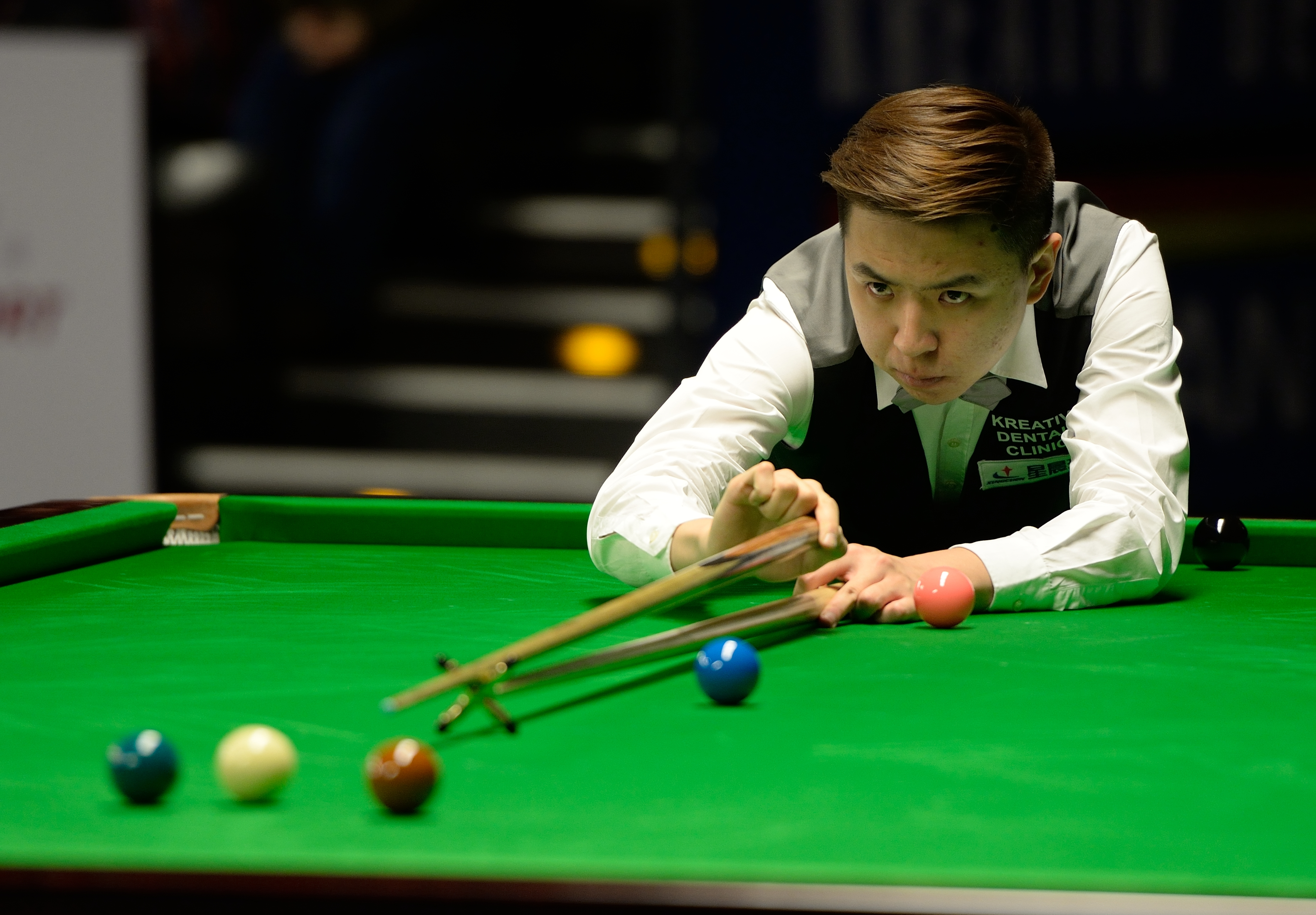
Xiao Guodong (pictured in 2015) made the fourth maximum break of his professional career is his 5–6 loss to Neil Robertson.

Xiao made the fourth maximum break of his professional career is his 5–6 loss to Neil Robertson. It was the 246th official maximum. Mark Williams beat Wakelin 6–5, defending champion Kyren Wilson defeated O'Sullivan 6–4. Wilson said after the match: "It is always great playing in Shanghai and somebody of the class of Ronnie O'Sullivan. You know the crowd are going to come out in their numbers when he is playing. It inspires me and makes me want to play snooker. I have my kids with me and I wanted to show them how amazing snooker is out here. I hope they enjoyed that one."

Judd Trump beat Hawkins 6–4. John Higgins defeated Lisowski 6–5. Higgins said of his upcoming quarter-final: "It gives you a little boost, making you realise you can beat him [Trump]. I think I'd lost so many matches in a row against him before that. I maybe could have nicked a couple of those, but he will maybe be feeling he should have nicked the last two. He is still big favourite to win. I need to play at the top of my game to have a chance." Shaun Murphy beat Zhou 6–5. Zhao Xintong defeated Ding 6–2, with five century breaks being made in the last five frames (three by Zhao and two by Ding including a maximum attempt), and Wu Yize beat Si 6–2, making back‑to‑back 140 breaks in the last two frames. Wu said: "Seeing more and more people in China enjoying snooker, coming to watch the matches and getting involved in the sport, is a really wonderful feeling for us as players. I hope we'll have even more tournaments in the future and see even more people taking part in the game."

=== Quarter-finals ===
In the afternoon session defending champion and top seed Wilson beat eighth seed Williams 6–5. Wilson said: "It has come with the experience of knowing I can turn matches around. Although you feel angry, it is about remaining calm and using it to spur you on. Perhaps that came from winning the World Championship in 2024. I know what I'm capable of and I'm pleased I finished the match off." Fifth seed Zhao whitewashed fourth seed Robertson.

In the evening session third seed Trump whitewashed sixth seed Higgins, scoring 515 points without reply. Trump said: "I started off well and there was a big second frame. John [Higgins] missed the last black going up for the yellow and at this level that kind of shot can turn a game. He didn't do a lot wrong after that. I don't know if I've ever beaten him 6–0 before. It was an incredible performance. He's such a consistent player and every time I've got in front in the past he's managed to get back into it." Second seed Wu defeated seventh seed Murphy 6–5. Wu said: I didn't feel I played very well. Although the result was good and I managed to win the match, I never really took control of it. Hopefully I can find my rhythm and get back to my best in the next match as I prepare for the semi-finals."

=== Semi-finals ===
The semi-finals were the best of 19 frames, played over two sessions.

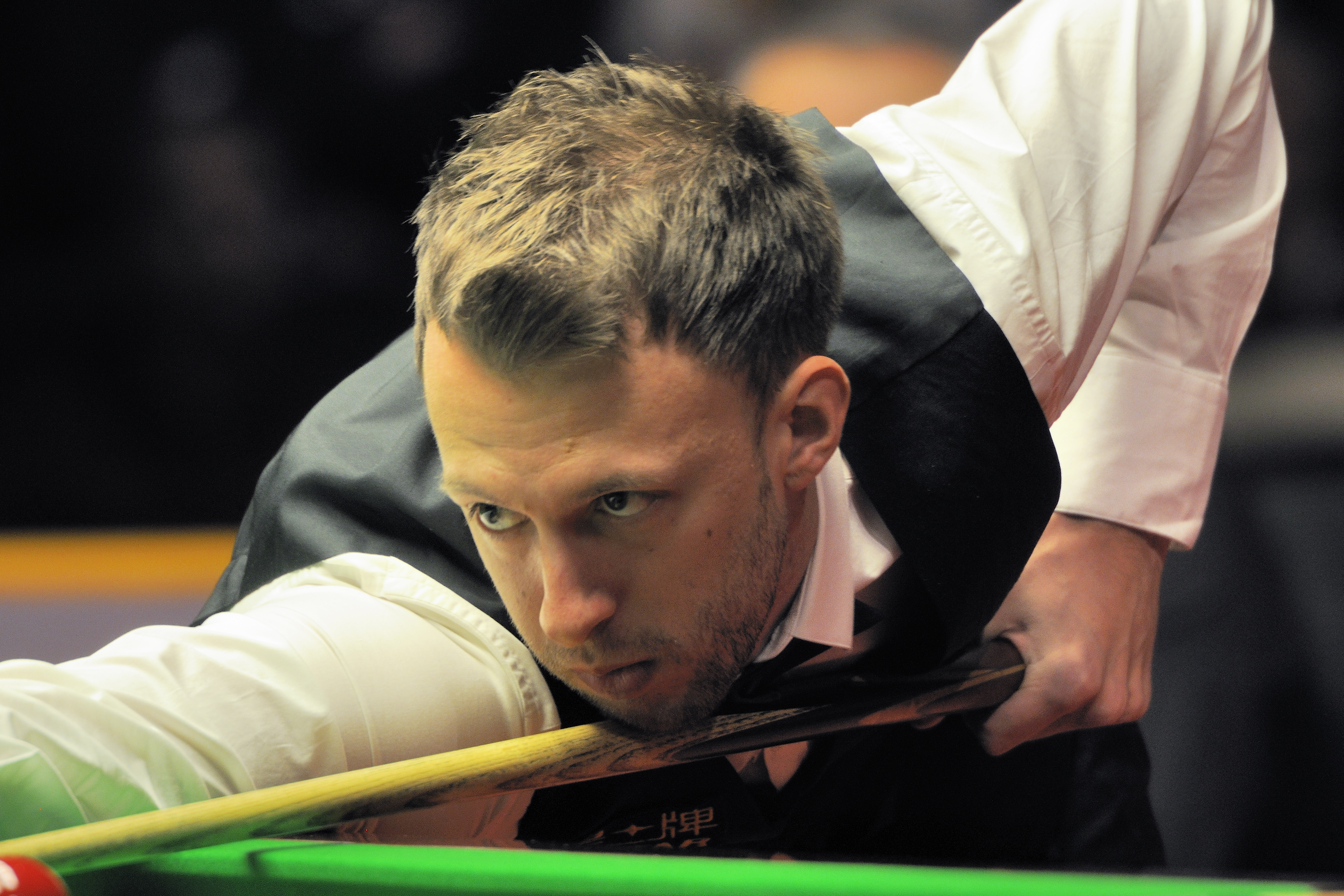
Judd Trump (pictured in 2014) defeated Wu Yize 10–6.

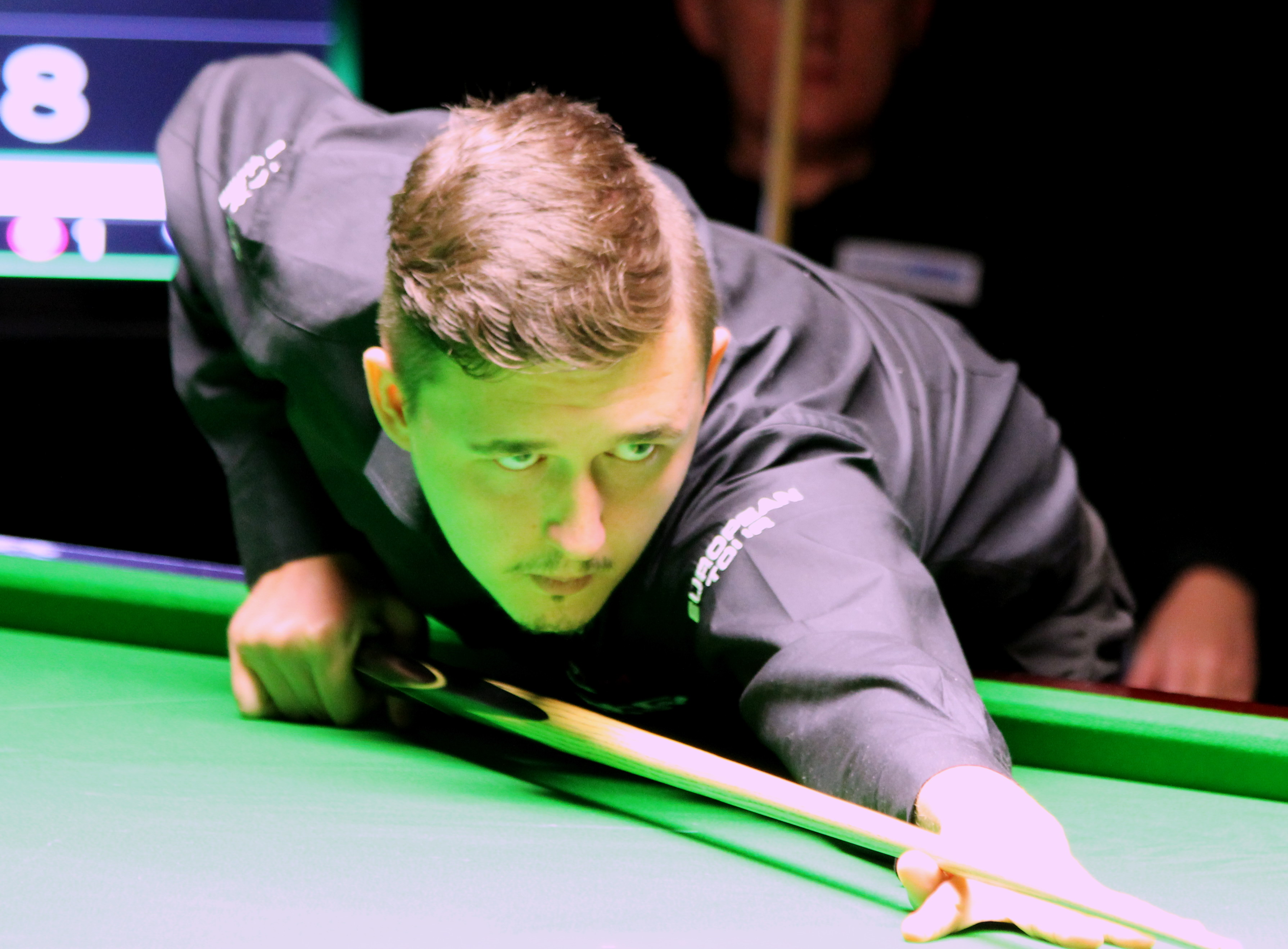
Kyren Wilson (pictured in 2014) beat Zhao Xintong 10–8.

On 31 July Trump played Wu. At the end of the afternoon session Trump led Wu 5–4. Trump went on to win the match 10–6, to reach his fifth Shanghai Masters final. Trump said: "It was tricky this afternoon. I managed to get out with a lead. It probably should have been 6–3, but I wasn't too disheartened. I knew my game was there and that I would get the chances. It was just about taking them. Luckily for me [Wu] made a few more mistakes than he did this afternoon. It is always good to start quickly in Shanghai. Even though this isn't a ranking event, it fills you with confidence as you are against the best in the world. I think if you lose early on in this event it can make you second guess yourself. It will be a great game between Kyren [Wilson] and [Zhao] Xintong. It should be an exciting final whoever I face. It has been a good tournament so far, but you need to get over that line." Wu said: "I'll continue to look at the areas where I need to improve and put more work into my practice. I believe I can handle the tournaments coming up. This event has been a good start to the season and a valuable opportunity for me to get some practice. I hope Zhao Xintong can play well tomorrow and keep the title in China. If I couldn't do it myself, I'll leave it to him."

On 1 August Wilson played Zhao. At the end of the afternoon session Wilson led Zhao 5–4. In the seventh frame Wilson missed the last black before the colours in a maximum break attempt. Wilson went on to win the match 10–8, to reach his third Shanghai Masters final. Wilson said: "I think it was a really good standard throughout. I was pleased with my afternoon's work to lead 5–4, then Zhao Xintong showed his class and reeled off four in a row. All of a sudden I was 8–6 behind and I was a little bit frustrated. I'm proud of how I held myself together, recomposed myself and took the match by the scruff of the neck. I've played Judd [Trump] in a few exhibitions out here recently. We've had good fun in those, but this is serious now. It is down to business."

=== Final ===
The final was the best of 21 frames, played over two sessions, between the defending champion Wilson and the world number one Trump. At the end of the afternoon session, Trump led Wilson 7–3. Trump went on to win the match, and the tournament, 11–6. After the match Trump said: "[Wilson's] beaten me in the last few finals. It was nice to start the season in that kind of manner and get one over on him, This tournament is amazing. I love coming to Shanghai. It is the first tournament of the year and it is a bit unknown how you are going to play. Especially with the challenge of [Zhao] Xintong and Wu Yize, this rivalry is important for us. I think Kyren [Wilson] struggled a bit in the ranking events last season. I did alright, but there are people just behind now. You want to show them that you are still the best in the world and it is important to be winning big events like this." Wilson said: "It should really have been 5–5 after the first session. That is how good Judd Trump is. If you give him a chance he will punish you and when he smells blood he goes for the kill. I made it too difficult tonight, but I kept fighting."

== Tournament draw ==
The tournament results for the event are shown below. Numbers in the column to the left of the players' names denote the players' seeding, an "a" indicates amateur status for the four wildcards, and players in bold denote match winners.

**Round 1** Best of 11 frames
**13** | **Ronnie O'Sullivan (ENG)** | **6**
a | Liu Linhao (CHN) | 1
**12** | **Chris Wakelin (ENG)** | **6**
a | Tang Hewen (CHN) | 0
**14** | **Ding Junhui (CHN)** | **6**
a | Yao Dongcheng (CHN) | 2
**11** | **Xiao Guodong (CHN)** | **6**
a | Xu Jiarui (CHN) | 5
**10** | **Barry Hawkins (ENG)** | **6**
20 | Lei Peifan (CHN) | 4
**16 (Note: Jack Lisowski replaced Mark Allen.)** | **Jack Lisowski (ENG)** | **6**
17 | Zhang Anda (CHN) | 4
9 | Mark Selby (ENG) | 5
**18** | **Zhou Yuelong (CHN)** | **6**
**15** | **Si Jiahui (CHN)** | **6**
19 | Pang Junxu (CHN) | 4

**Last 16**; Best of 11 frames
**1** | **Kyren Wilson (ENG)** | **6**
13 | Ronnie O'Sullivan (ENG) | 4
**8** | **Mark Williams (WAL)** | **6**
12 | Chris Wakelin (ENG) | 5
**5** | **Zhao Xintong (CHN)** | **6**
14 | Ding Junhui (CHN) | 2
**4** | **Neil Robertson (AUS)** | **6**
11 | Xiao Guodong (CHN) | 5
**3** | **Judd Trump (ENG)** | **6**
10 | Barry Hawkins (ENG) | 4
**6** | **John Higgins (SCO)** | **6**
16 | Jack Lisowski (ENG) | 5
**7** | **Shaun Murphy (ENG)** | **6**
18 | Zhou Yuelong (CHN) | 5
**2** | **Wu Yize (CHN)** | **6**
15 | Si Jiahui (CHN) | 2

**Quarter-finals**; Best of 11 frames
**1** | **(England) Kyren Wilson** | **6**
8 | (Wales) Mark Williams | 5
**5** | **(China) Zhao Xintong** | **6**
4 | (Australia) Neil Robertson | 0
**3** | **(England) Judd Trump** | **6**
6 | (Scotland) John Higgins | 0
7 | (England) Shaun Murphy | 5
**2** | **(China) Wu Yize** | **6**

**Semi-finals**; Best of 19 frames
**1** | **(England) Kyren Wilson** | **10**
5 | (China) Zhao Xintong | 8
**3** | **(England) Judd Trump** | **10**
2 | (China) Wu Yize | 6

**Final**; Best of 21 frames
1 | (England) Kyren Wilson | 6
**3** | **(England) Judd Trump** | **11**

=== Final: frame scores ===
Final: Best of 21 frames. Referee: Lyu Zhiwei; Luwan Indoor Stadium, Shanghai, China, 2 August 2026
| Kyren Wilson (1); England | 6–**11** | **Judd Trump** (3); England |
Afternoon: **87**–8, 37–**74**, 43–**73**, 0–**66**, **48**–21, 66–**67**, **65**–16, 4–**74**, 46–**70**, 4–**82**; Evening: 49–**67**, **103**–4 (103), **59**–44, 58–**60**, 64–**78**, **134**–0 (134), 5–**77**
| (frame 16) **134** | Highest break | 82 (frame 10) |
| **2** | Century breaks | 0 |

== Century breaks ==
A total of 54 century breaks were made during the tournament.

- 147, 133, 121 – Xiao Guodong
- 142, 138, 128, 113, 112, 106, 102 – Judd Trump
- 140, 140, 112, 110, 108, 103 – Wu Yize
- 140, 125, 112, 108, 103, 103 – Ding Junhui
- 139, 135, 117, 112, 102, 101, 100, 100 – Zhao Xintong
- 135, 107 – Zhou Yuelong
- 134, 129, 113, 113, 113, 103, 101 – Kyren Wilson
- 131, 111, 100 – Ronnie O'Sullivan
- 124, 113, 100 – Mark Williams
- 123, 109 – Jack Lisowski
- 121, 121, 102 – Barry Hawkins
- 115 – Neil Robertson
- 113, 112 – Mark Selby
- 106 – Zhang Anda
