= 2023 Shanghai Masters =

2023 invitational snooker tournament

Tournament information
- Dates: 11–17 September 2023
- Venue: Shanghai Grand Stage
- City: Shanghai
- Country: China
- Organisation: World Snooker Tour
- Format: Non-ranking event
- Total prize fund: £825,000
- Winner's share: £210,000
- Highest break: Ronnie O'Sullivan (ENG) (143)

Final
- Champion: Ronnie O'Sullivan (ENG)
- Runner-up: Luca Brecel (BEL)
- Score: 11–9

The 2023 Shanghai Masters was a professional non-ranking snooker tournament that took place from 11 to 17 September 2023 at the Shanghai Grand Stage in Shanghai, China. Part of the 2023–24 snooker season, it was the 14th edition of the Shanghai Masters since the tournament was first held in 2007 and the third edition since the tournament became an invitational event in 2018. It was the first professional snooker tournament played in mainland China since the 2019 World Open, due to the impact of the COVID-19 pandemic. A total of 24 players—comprising the top 16 players in the world rankings, the four highest-ranked Chinese players outside the top 16, and four Chinese wildcard players—were invited to participate. The tournament was broadcast by local channels in China, Thailand, and Hong Kong, by Eurosport and Discovery+ in Europe, and by Matchroom Sport in all other territories. The winner received £210,000 from a total prize fund of £825,000.

Ronnie O'Sullivan was the defending champion, having defeated Shaun Murphy 11–9 in the 2019 final. He retained the title, beating the reigning World Champion Luca Brecel 11–9 in the final to win his fifth Shanghai Masters title and his fourth consecutively. The final was the 19th consecutive match he had won at the tournament since 2017. The tournament produced a total of 35 century breaks, of which the highest was a 143 by O'Sullivan in the 16th frame of the final.

== Overview ==
The inaugural 2007 Shanghai Masters was won by Dominic Dale, who defeated Ryan Day 10–6 in the final. Staged as a ranking event from 2007 to 2017, the Shanghai Masters in 2018 became a non-ranking invitational event comprising 24 players. As of the 2023 edition, Ronnie O'Sullivan was the tournament's most successful player to date, having won four previous titles in 2009, 2017, 2018, and 2019. The only other player to claim the title more than once was Ding Junhui, who won in 2013 and 2016. O'Sullivan was the defending champion, having won the 2019 edition of the tournament with an 11–9 victory over Shaun Murphy.

The 2023 edition took place at the Shanghai Grand Stage in Shanghai, China, from 11 to 17 September. It was the first staging of the tournament in four years, and the first professional snooker tournament held in mainland China since the 2019 World Open, due to the impact of the COVID-19 pandemic. It featured the top 16 players in the world rankings as they stood after the 2023 Championship League, the four highest-ranked Chinese players outside the top 16 (Zhou Yuelong, Fan Zhengyi, Si Jiahui, and Pang Junxu), and four wildcard players from the Chinese Billiards and Snooker Association's under-21 rankings (Deng Haohui, Dong Zihao, Bai Yulu, and Gong Chenzhi).

=== Format ===
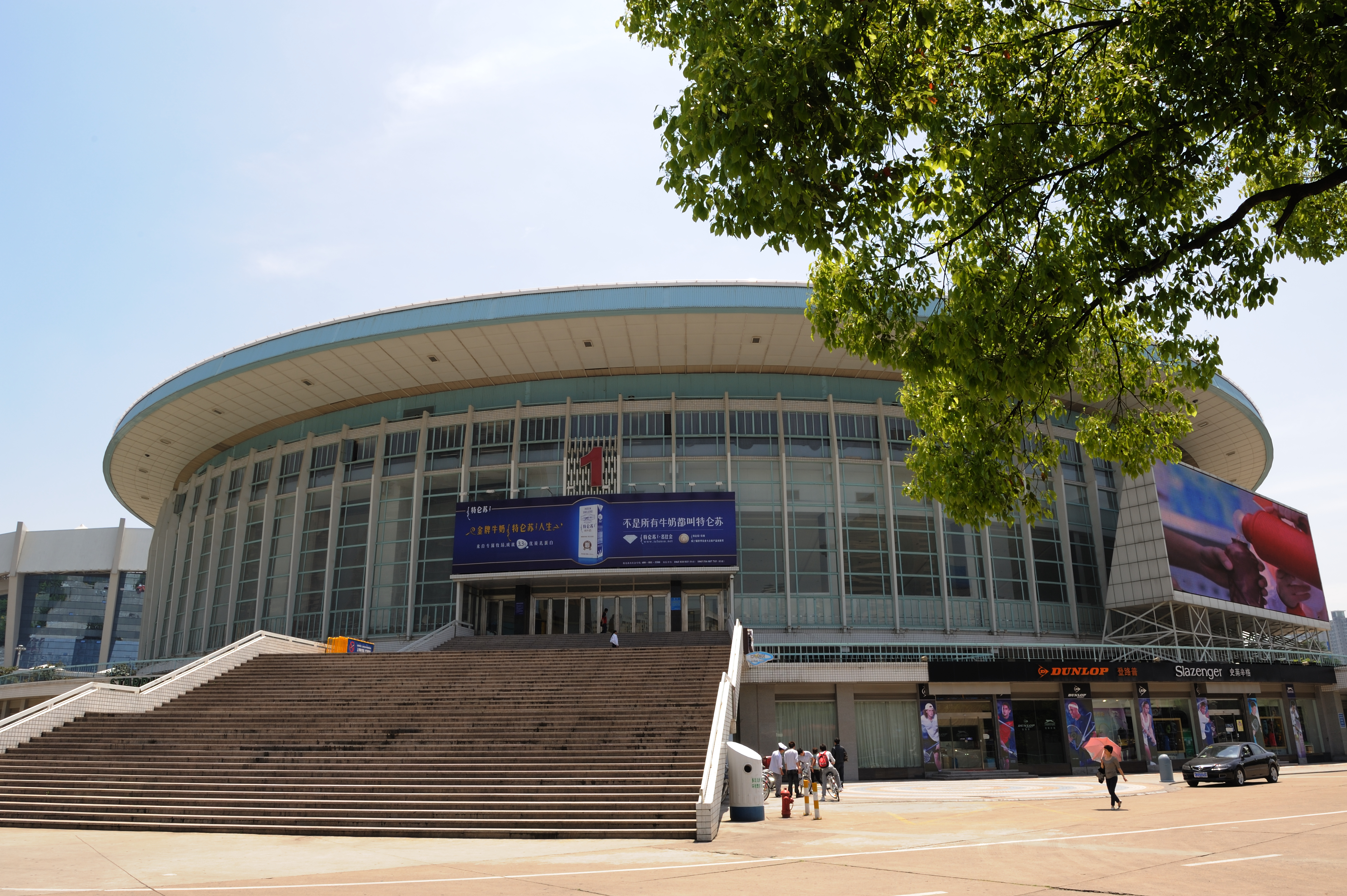
The tournament venue, the Shanghai Grand Stage in Shanghai, China

Matches up to and including the quarter-finals were played as best of 11 frames. The semi-finals were the best of 19 frames, played over two sessions, and the final was the best of 21 frames, also played over two sessions. Players were seeded in the tournament by their world ranking. The top eight seeds received byes to the second round. Each invited Chinese player faced one of the players seeded 9–16 in the first round.

=== Broadcasters ===
The tournament was broadcast in China on Superstar online, Migu, Youku, and Huya.com; in Thailand on True Sports; in Hong Kong on Now TV; and in Europe on Eurosport and Discovery+. In all other territories, the tournament was broadcast by Matchroom Sport.

=== Prize fund ===
The total prize fund was £825,000, with the winner receiving £210,000. The breakdown of prize money is shown below:

- Winner: £210,000
- Runner-up: £105,000
- Semi-final: £70,000
- Quarter-final: £35,000
- Last 16: £17,500
- Last 24: £10,000
- Highest break: £10,000
- Total: £825,000

== Summary ==
=== First round ===
The first-round matches took place on 11 and 12 September, featuring eight Chinese invitees against players seeded nine through sixteen. Two-time winner Ding Junhui led 2023 World Championship semi-finalist Si Jiahui 3–1 at the mid-session interval and went on to win the match 6–2. John Higgins whitewashed Chinese wildcard player Deng Haohui, making back-to-back century breaks of 102 and 141 in the third and fourth frames. The latter was Higgins's 950th century in professional competition, making him the second player, after O'Sullivan, to reach that threshold. Hossein Vafaei defeated Chinese wildcard player Gong Chenzhi 6–1, making three centuries of 120, 117, and 108 in the match, while Jack Lisowski produced an 84 break to win the deciding frame against Zhou Yuelong. Gary Wilson offered a handshake after the sixth frame of his match against Fan Zhengyi, mistakenly believing believing the match to be the best of 9 frames. Fan went on to secure a 6–2 victory. Mark Williams and Robert Milkins advanced with 6–1 wins over Pang Junxu and Bai Yulu respectively.

=== Last 16 ===
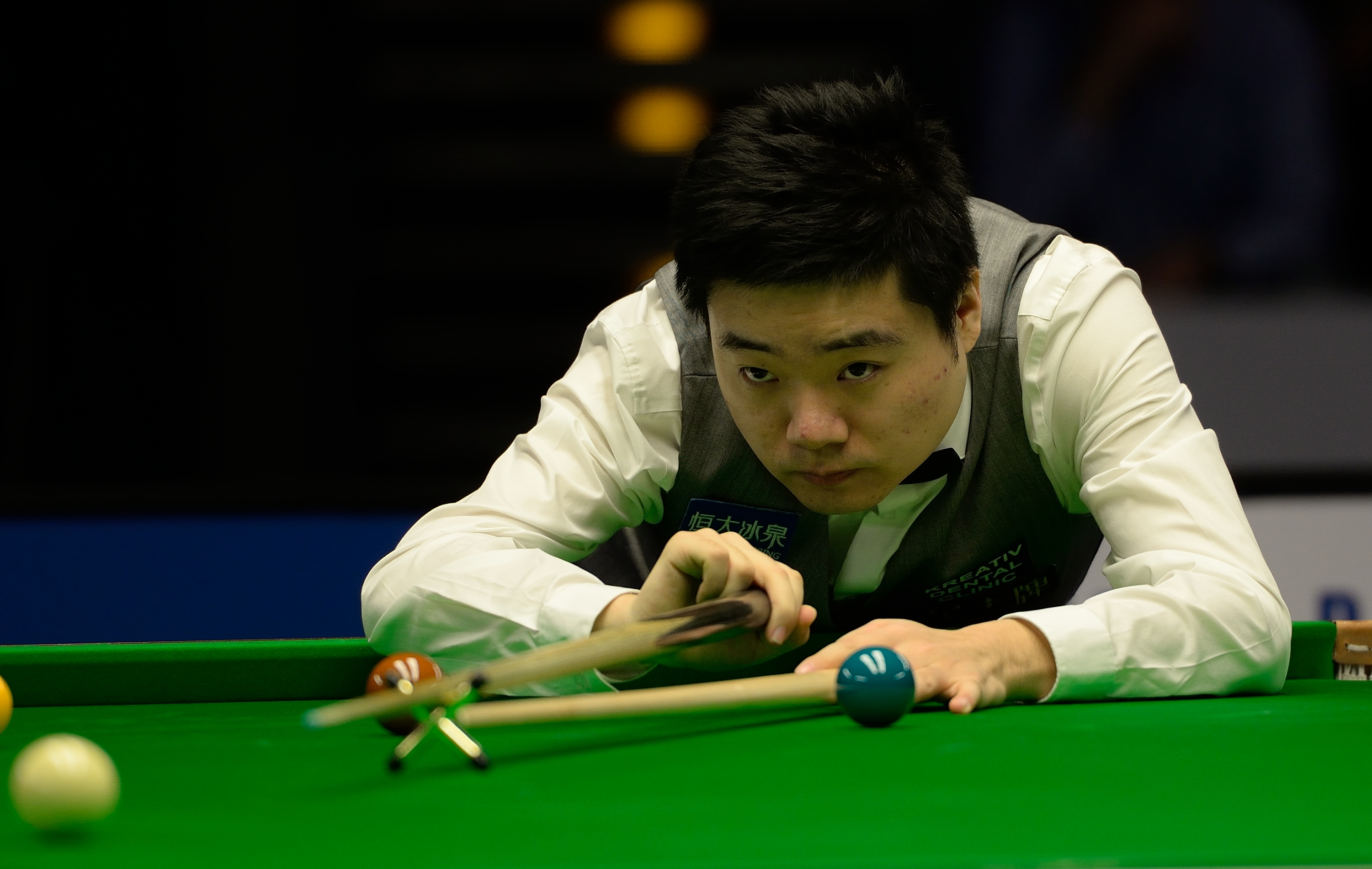
The tournament's top-ranked Chinese player and two-time champion Ding Junhui (pictured in 2015) lost in the last 16.

The round of 16 took place on 12 and 13 September, featuring the first-round winners against players seeded one through eight. Having withdrawn from the 2023 Championship League and the 2023 European Masters, O'Sullivan played his first match of the 2023–24 season against the 2010 winner Ali Carter. O'Sullivan led 3–1 at the mid-session interval but Carter made breaks of 68 and 83 to tie the scores at 3–3. O'Sullivan then won three consecutive frames with breaks of 101, 74, and 81 for a 6–3 victory. Higgins defeated the 2015 winner Kyren Wilson by the same score. Lisowski faced three-time runner-up Judd Trump. With the scores tied at 5–5, Lisowski took a 42-point lead in the deciding frame, but Trump secured victory with a 74 break. Mark Selby defeated Vafaei, also in a deciding frame.

Luca Brecel faced Williams, who won the first frame on the last black, and then won the second with a 74 break. Brecel won three consecutive frames with breaks of 77, 92, and 107 to lead 3–2 before Williams tied the scores with a 110 century. However, Brecel won three of the last four frames for a 6–4 victory. Milkins faced Shaun Murphy. The scores were tied at 2–2, but Murphy then made breaks of 95 and 134 to take a 4–2 lead. Milkins won three consecutive frames, including a century of 120, as he moved 5–4 ahead. Murphy forced a deciding frame, but Milkins secured a 6–5 victory with a 64 break. From 3–5 behind against Ding, Neil Robertson made breaks of 72 and 71 to tie the scores and then made a 65 break in the decider to win the match. The world number three Mark Allen made a 135 break in the opening frame against Fan. The scores were tied at 2–2 at the mid-session interval. Allen won frame five, but Fan then took four consecutive frames with breaks including 88, 91, and 84 to secure a 6–3 victory. Allen scored only nine points in the last four frames of the match.

=== Quarter-finals ===
The quarter-finals took place on 14 September. Higgins made breaks of 103, 115, 71, and 74 as he moved into a 5–2 lead over O'Sullivan. He took a 56-point lead in the eighth, but O'Sullivan won the frame on the pink. Higgins also had chances to win the match in the ninth, but O'Sullivan took the frame and then made back-to-back centuries of 100 and 130 to secure a 6–5 win. "[Higgins] should have put me away, really. He had enough chances. He was 5–2 up and in control of the game", O'Sullivan commented afterwards. Trump won the first frame against Selby, but Selby then won six consecutive frames to secure a 6–1 victory; it was the first time he had beaten Trump since 2015, having lost in all of their previous five encounters. Robertson made breaks of 77, 62, and 107 as he defeated Fan 6–1. Between frames five and six, referee Zhu Ying asked Robertson to stop eating a banana. Paul Collier, who had refereed three World Championship finals, later clarified on social media that eating between frames did not contravene any of the sport's rules and stated that the issue would be addressed with the event's referees. Brecel lost the first two frames against Milkins but won six of the next seven for a 6–3 victory.

=== Semi-finals ===
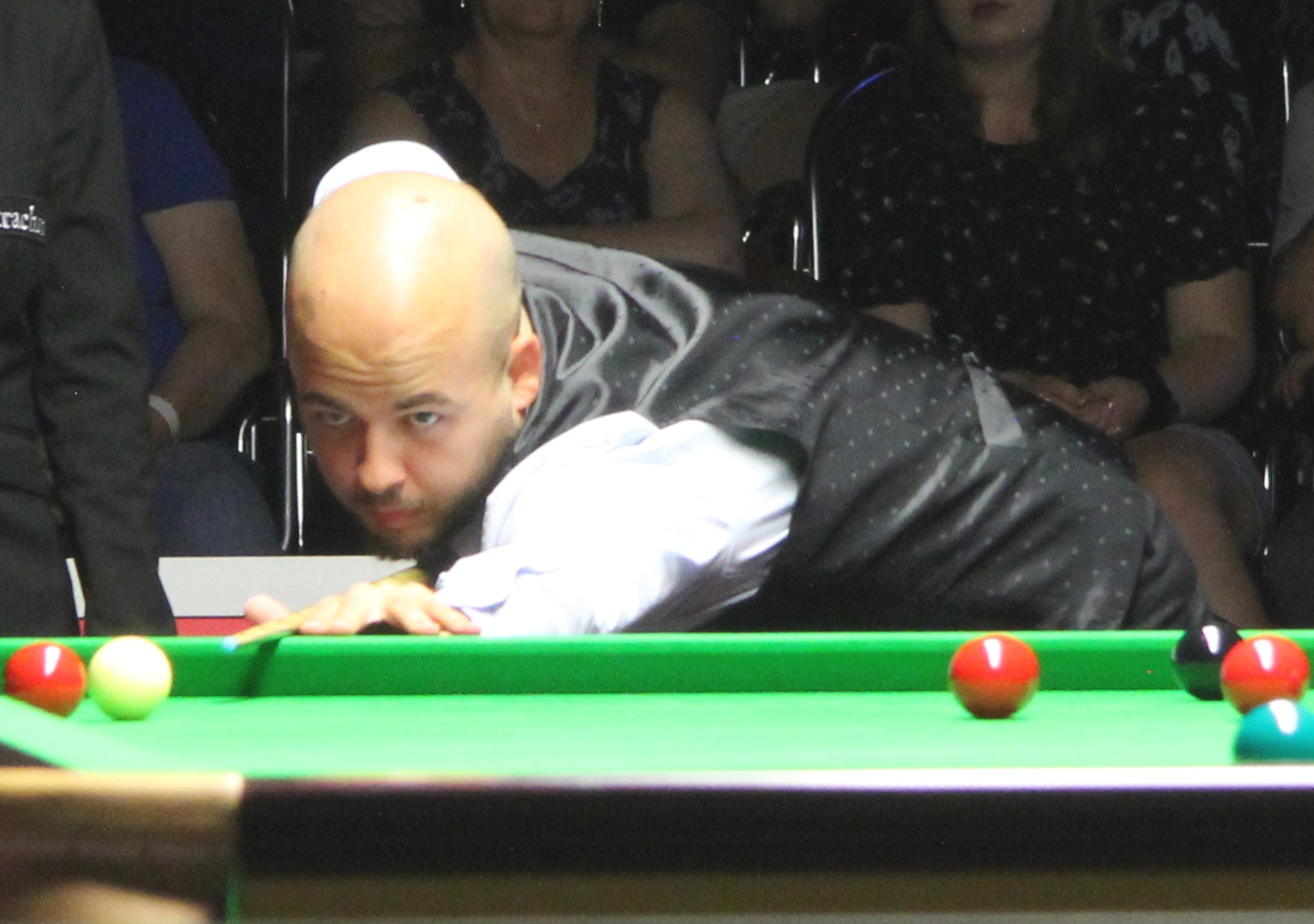
The reigning World Champion Luca Brecel (pictured in 2022) defeated Neil Robertson to reach his first Shanghai Masters final.

The first best-of-19-frame semi-final took place over two sessions on 15 September between O'Sullivan and Selby. It was the first time the two players had faced each other since the 2020 Scottish Open final, where Selby had defeated O'Sullivan 9–3. Selby led 5–4 after the first session. In the second session, O'Sullivan tied the scores at 6–6 after winning the 12th frame on the pink, but Selby won the 13th with a 77 break. In the 14th, Selby missed a frame ball pink off the spot while on a break of 65, and O'Sullivan made a 66 clearance to tie the scores again at 7–7. O'Sullivan then made breaks of 69, 109, and 118 to secure a 10–7 victory and reach his fourth consecutive Shanghai Masters final. In frame 15, referee Wang Wei called a foul against O'Sullivan, claiming that he had not hit the brown while attempting to lay a snooker, but reversed his decision after O'Sullivan objected. "It was difficult, but I was pleased to find some form at the end", O'Sullivan said after the match.

The second semi-final took place on September 16 between Brecel and Robertson. Robertson had won all three of their previous encounters. Brecel won the 43-minute opening frame, took the second on the last black, and extended his lead to 3–0 with a 68 break in the third. Robertson won frame four with a 95 break and also took frame five, but Brecel then won three consecutive frames to lead 6–2. Robertson won frame nine to leave Brecel leading 6–‍3 at the end of the first session. When play resumed for the second session, Robertson won the 10th frame on the last black, but Brecel won the 11th with an 84 break. Robertson won the next two frames, reducing Brecel's lead to one at 7–6. Brecel made a 123 break to take the 14th, and Robertson responded with a 109 break to win the 15th. Brecel won the next two frames to secure a 10–7 victory. Afterwards, Brecel said: "This was a tough game. We struggled a bit, but I'm happy to be in the final. Playing [O'Sullivan] is going to be hard, he hasn't lost here for seven years so it will be a big challenge."

=== Final ===
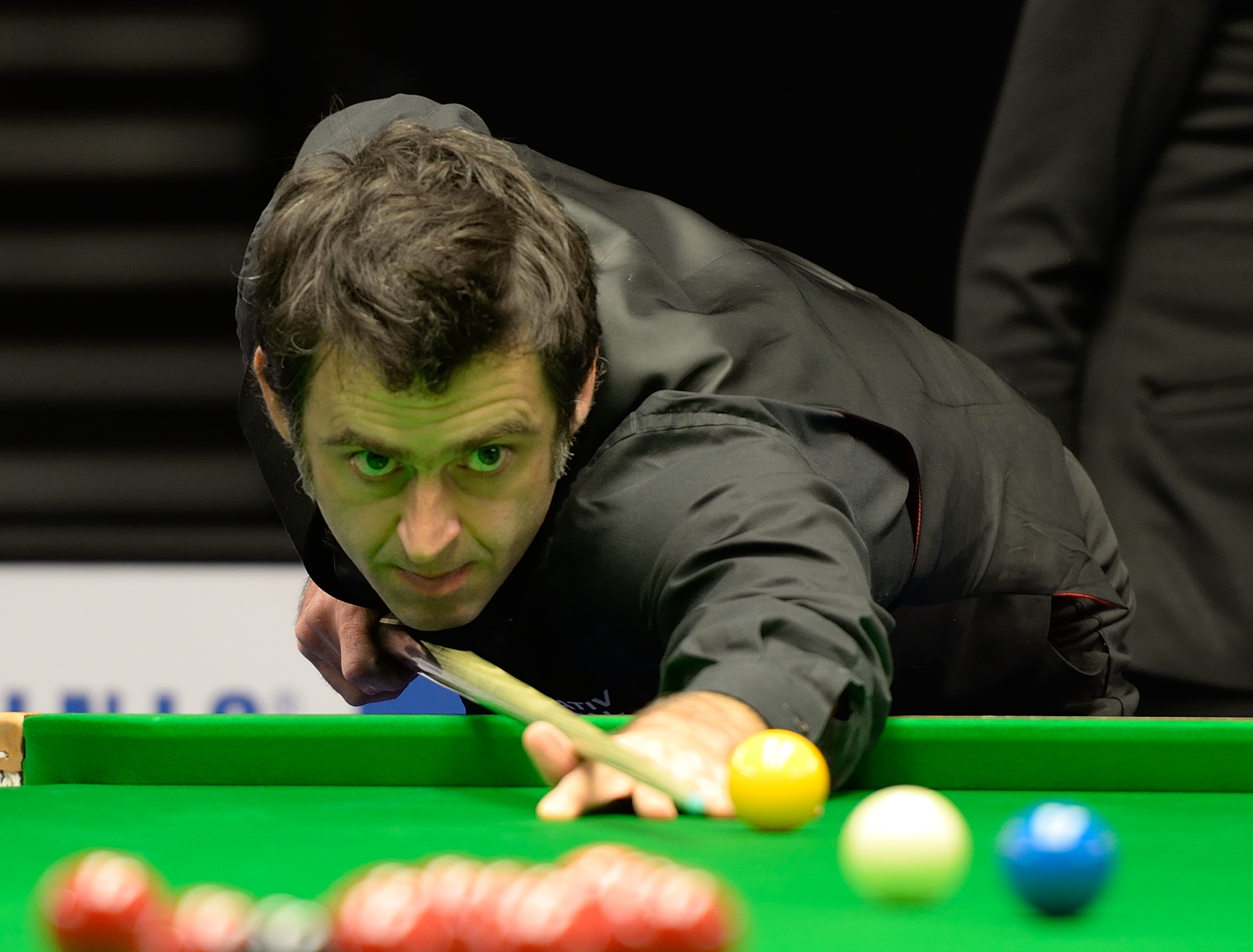
The defending champion Ronnie O'Sullivan (pictured in 2015) won his fifth Shanghai Masters title. He made the tournament's highest break of 143 in the final.

The best-of-21-frame final took place over two sessions on 17 September between the defending champion and world number one O'Sullivan and the reigning World Champion Brecel. Brecel played in his first Shanghai Masters final, while O'Sullivan contested his sixth final at the event, having won four and lost one previously. Ten frames were played in the opening session. O'Sullivan won the first, Brecel took the second with a 134 break, and O'Sullivan won the next two to lead 3–1 at the mid‑session interval. Brecel won three consecutive frames with breaks of 75, 98, and 103 to lead 4–3, but O'Sullivan won the last three frames of the session for a 6–4 advantage.

When play resumed for the second session, the first two frames were shared. Brecel won two consecutive frames to tie the scores at 7–7, but O'Sullivan responded with three frames in a row, including back-to-back centuries of 143 (the tournament's highest break) and 120 to move one from victory at 10–7. Brecel won the 18th frame on the last black by doubling it the full length of the table and also took the 19th frame with an 83 break, narrowing O'Sullivan's lead to one at 10–9. However, O'Sullivan won the 20th frame on the last pink to secure an 11–9 victory. It was the 19th consecutive match he had won at the tournament since 2017, giving him his fifth Shanghai Masters title and his fourth consecutively. "It was one of those tournaments. I was well below par, but in moments I played alright when I had to. I wasn't on auto pilot, everything was a bit of a struggle from start to finish", commented O'Sullivan afterwards.

== Main draw ==
The tournament results for the event are shown below. Numbers in parentheses after the players' names denote their seeding, and players in bold denote match winners.

**Round 1** Best of 11 frames
**11**	**Ali Carter (ENG)**	**6**
w/c	Dong Zihao (CHN)	2
**10**	**John Higgins (SCO)**	**6**
w/c	Deng Haohui (CHN)	0
**16**	**Hossein Vafaei (IRN)**	**6**
w/c	Gong Chenzhi (CHN)	1
**13**	**Jack Lisowski (ENG)**	**6**
17	Zhou Yuelong (CHN)	5
14	Gary Wilson (ENG)	2
**18**	**Fan Zhengyi (CHN)**	**6**
**15**	**Ding Junhui (CHN)**	**6**
19	Si Jiahui (CHN)	2
**12**	**Robert Milkins (ENG)**	**6**
w/c	Bai Yulu (CHN)	1
**9**	**Mark Williams (WAL)**	**6**
20	Pang Junxu (CHN)	1

**Last 16**; Best of 11 frames
**1**	**Ronnie O'Sullivan (ENG)**	**6**
11	Ali Carter (ENG)	3
8	Kyren Wilson (ENG)	3
**10**	**John Higgins (SCO)**	**6**
**5**	**Mark Selby (ENG)**	**6**
16	Hossein Vafaei (IRN)	5
**4**	**Judd Trump (ENG)**	**6**
13	Jack Lisowski (ENG)	5
3	Mark Allen (NIR)	3
**18**	**Fan Zhengyi (CHN)**	**6**
**6**	**Neil Robertson (AUS)**	**6**
15	Ding Junhui (CHN)	5
7	Shaun Murphy (ENG)	5
**12**	**Robert Milkins (ENG)**	**6**
**2**	**Luca Brecel (BEL)**	**6**
9	Mark Williams (WAL)	4

**Quarter-finals**; Best of 11 frames
**1**	**(England) Ronnie O'Sullivan**	**6**
10	(Scotland) John Higgins	5
**5**	**(England) Mark Selby**	**6**
4	(England) Judd Trump	1
18	(China) Fan Zhengyi	1
**6**	**(Australia) Neil Robertson**	**6**
12	(England) Robert Milkins	3
**2**	**(Belgium) Luca Brecel**	**6**

**Semi-finals**; Best of 19 frames
**1**	**(England) Ronnie O'Sullivan**	**10**
5	(England) Mark Selby	7
6	(Australia) Neil Robertson	7
**2**	**(Belgium) Luca Brecel**	**10**

**Final**; Best of 21 frames
**1**	**(England) Ronnie O'Sullivan**	**11**
2	(Belgium) Luca Brecel	9

Note: w/c = wildcard

=== Final: frame scores ===
Final: Best of 21 frames. Referee: Peggy Li; Shanghai Grand Stage, Shanghai, China, 17 September 2023
**Ronnie O'Sullivan** (1); England	**11**–9	Luca Brecel (2); Belgium
Afternoon: **86**–6, 0–**134** (134), **76**–38, **79**–48, 0–**76**, 22–**98**, 0–**103** (103), **98**–31, **78**–29, **69**–44; Evening: 63–**66**, **88**–0, 11–**86**, 36–**64**, **95**–30, **143**–0 (143), **120**–0 (120), 57–**71**, 12–**83**, **67**–47
(frame 16) **143**	Highest break	134 (frame 2)
2	Century breaks	2

== Century breaks ==
A total of 35 century breaks were made during the tournament.

- 143, 130, 120, 118, 113, 109, 101, 100 – Ronnie O'Sullivan
- 141, 115, 103, 102, 100 – John Higgins
- 135 – Mark Allen
- 135 – Shaun Murphy
- 134, 123, 107, 103 – Luca Brecel
- 129, 120 – Kyren Wilson
- 127, 120 – Robert Milkins
- 122 – Ali Carter
- 120, 117, 108 – Hossein Vafaei
- 119 – Jack Lisowski
- 117 – Ding Junhui
- 110, 107 – Mark Williams
- 109, 107, 102 – Neil Robertson
- 101 – Mark Selby
