= 2019 Shanghai Masters =

2019 invitational snooker tournament

Tournament information
- Dates: 9–15 September 2019
- Venue: Regal International East Asia Hotel
- City: Shanghai
- Country: China
- Organisation: WPBSA
- Format: Non-ranking event
- Total prize fund: £751,000
- Winner's share: £200,000
- Highest break: (England) Barry Hawkins (142)

Final
- Champion: (England) Ronnie O'Sullivan
- Runner-up: (England) Shaun Murphy
- Score: 11–9

The 2019 Shanghai Masters was a professional non-ranking snooker tournament that took place at the Regal International East Asia Hotel in Shanghai, China from 9 to 15 September 2019. The 13th edition of the Shanghai Masters, first held in 2007, it was the second edition since the tournament became an invitational event in 2018. The event was broadcast by Great Sports Channel, Superstars Online, Youku and Zhibo.tv in China, by NowTV in Hong Kong, and by Eurosport in Europe. The winner received £200,000 from a total prize fund of £751,000.

The defending champion was Ronnie O'Sullivan, who had defeated Barry Hawkins 11–9 in the 2018 final. O'Sullivan won his fourth Shanghai Masters title, and his third consecutively, by defeating Shaun Murphy 11–9 in the final.

== Overview ==
The Shanghai Masters is an invitational non-ranking snooker tournament open to the top 16 ranked players on the World Snooker Tour as well as selected Chinese players. The players consist of the top-16 in the world rankings after the 2019 International Championship, as well as eight Chinese players. The invited Chinese players include four players not ranked in the top-16 in the world rankings, two players from the Chinese Billiard Snooker Association under-21 rankings and two from China's Amateur Masters series. Matches were all best-of-11-frames, except for the semi-finals (19 frames) and the final (21 frames). The defending champion was Ronnie O'Sullivan who won the 2018 event by beating Barry Hawkins 11–9 in the final. O'Sullivan has also won the 2017 tournament.

Players were ranked in the tournament by their world ranking, with the exceptions of O'Sullivan, who was the first seed, whilst 2019 World Snooker Championship winner Judd Trump was seeded second. The top eight seeded players received byes into the second round. Each invited Chinese player played one of the players seeded 9–16 in the first round. The event was broadcast by Great Sports Channel, Superstars Online, Youku and Zhibo.tv in China, True Sport in Thailand as well as NowTV in Hong Kong and Eurosport in Europe.

=== Prize fund ===
A total of £751,000 was awarded at the event, with the winner receiving £200,000. The breakdown of prize money is shown below:

- Winner: £200,000
- Runner-up: £100,000
- Semi-final: £62,500
- Quarter-final: £32,000
- Last 16: £16,000
- Last 24: £8,000
- Highest break: £6,000
- Total: £751,000

== Tournament summary ==
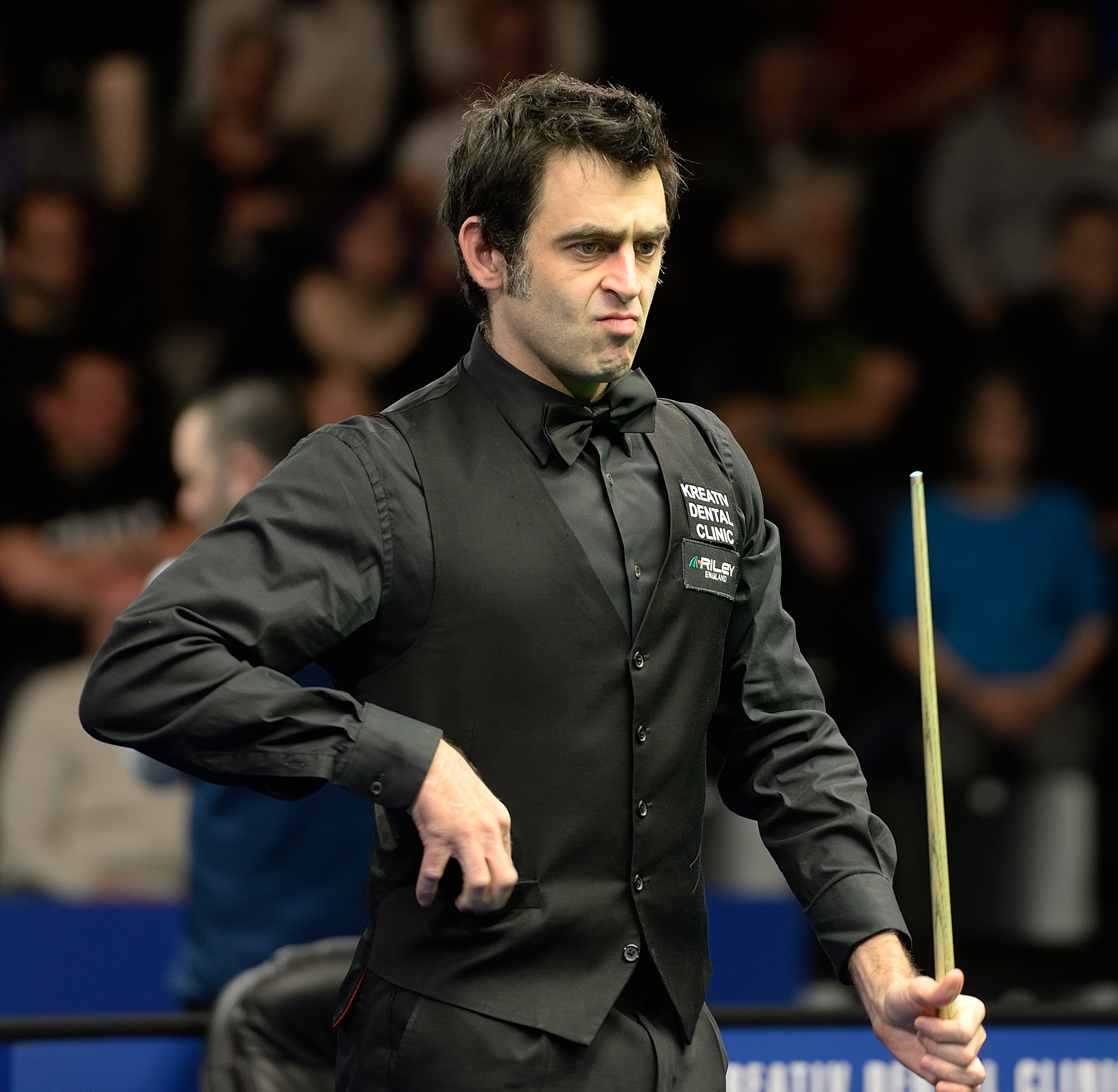
Ronnie O'Sullivan won the event, his third straight Shanghai Masters title, defeating Shaun Murphy in the final.

The tournament was held from 9 to 15 September 2019. The first round featured 9–16 seeded players against Chinese players. Six of the eight seeded players progressed, with David Gilbert completing a whitewash of Cao Jin. Chinese 25 year-old amateur Zhang Yi defeated 16th seed Ali Carter 6–3, whilst 15th seed Stephen Maguire lost to Xiao Guodong 2–6. Zhang drew O'Sullivan in the second round, with O'Sullivan completing a 6–0 whitewash with breaks of 69, 80, 69, 65, 143 and 132. Guodong, however, lost to eighth seed Kyren Wilson 4–6. Two former world champions, Shaun Murphy and Mark Williams played all 11 frames in their second round match. Murphy compiled a break of 136 to win the match 6–5. In another deciding frame, Barry Hawkins defeated John Higgins 6–5. Hawkins made the highest break of the tournament in frame four, making a 142. The last remaining Chinese player, 9th seed Ding Junhui lost in the second round to Neil Robertson 6–3, after Robertson won the first four frames.

Wilson met O'Sullivan in the quarter-finals, with O'Sullivan winning 6–5. Wilson had taken an early lead, winning five of the first six frames of the match, before O'Sullivan won the next five in-a-row to win the match. O'Sullivan met Robertson in the semi-final, after Robertson's 6–2 win over Hawkins. O'Sullivan defeated Robertson 10–6 in the semi-final, despite his cue tip breaking in frame six. Shaun Murphy defeated Jack Lisowski 6–1 in the quarter-final, before playing Mark Allen in the semi-final. Allen had also defeated the world champion Judd Trump 6–1 in the last quarter-final. Murphy took a 6–3 lead after the first session, before winning the next four frames in-a-row to claim a 10–3 victory.

The final was played 15 September 2019 between O'Sullivan and Murphy as a best-of-21-frames match held over two sessions. Murphy won the opening three frames, before O'Sullivan won the next four frames to lead 4–3. Murphy took the lead, after winning the next two frames, with O'Sullivan winning frame ten to level the match at 5–5 between sessions. A match-high break of 130 was made by O'Sullivan in frame 14 to level the match again a few frames later at 7–7. O'Sullivan won the next three frames including a break of 124 to lead 10–7 and be a frame away from victory. Murphy won both frame 18 and 19 before O'Sullivan won frame 20 to win the match with a break of 86. The win was O'Sullivan's third straight Shanghai Masters tournament victory.

== Main draw ==
The tournament results for the event are shown below. Players in bold denote match winners. Numbers in brackets indicate the player's seeding.

**Round 1** Best of 11 frames
16	(England) Ali Carter	3
(China) **Zhang Yi**	**6**
15	(Scotland) Stephen Maguire	2
(China) **Xiao Guodong**	**6**
10	(England) **Barry Hawkins**	**6**
(China) Yan Bingtao	5
9	(China) **Ding Junhui**	**6**
(China) Zhao Jianbo	2
14	(England) **Shaun Murphy**	**6**
(China) Lyu Haotian	1
11	(England) **Jack Lisowski**	**6**
(China) Wu Yize	1
13	(England) Stuart Bingham	4
(China) **Liang Wenbo**	**6**
12	(England) **David Gilbert**	**6**
(China) Cao Jin	0

**Round 2** Best of 11 frames
1	(England) **Ronnie O'Sullivan**	**6**
(China) Zhang Yi	0
8	(England) **Kyren Wilson**	**6**
(China) Xiao Guodong	4
5	(Scotland) John Higgins	5
10	(England) **Barry Hawkins**	**6**
4	(Australia) **Neil Robertson**	**6**
9	(China) Ding Junhui	3
3	(Wales) Mark Williams	5
14	(England) **Shaun Murphy**	**6**
6	(England) Mark Selby	3
11	(England) **Jack Lisowski**	**6**
7	(Northern Ireland) **Mark Allen**	**6**
(China) Liang Wenbo	5
2	(England) **Judd Trump**	**6**
12	(England) David Gilbert	4

**Quarter-finals**; Best of 11 frames
1	(England) **Ronnie O'Sullivan**	**6**
8	(England) Kyren Wilson	5
10	(England) Barry Hawkins	2
4	(Australia) **Neil Robertson**	**6**
14	(England) **Shaun Murphy**	**6**
11	(England) Jack Lisowski	1
7	(Northern Ireland) **Mark Allen**	**6**
2	(England) Judd Trump	1

**Semi-finals**; Best of 19 frames
1	(England) **Ronnie O'Sullivan**	**10**
4	(Australia) Neil Robertson	6
14	(England) **Shaun Murphy**	**10**
7	(Northern Ireland) Mark Allen	3

**Final**; Best of 21 frames
1	(England) **Ronnie O'Sullivan**	**11**
14	(England) Shaun Murphy	9

=== Final ===
Final: Best-of-21-frames. Referee: Zheng Weili. Regal International East Asia Hotel, Shanghai, China, 15 September 2019.
**Ronnie O'Sullivan** (1); England	**11**–9	Shaun Murphy (14); England
Afternoon: 19–**65**, 52–**63** (62), 18–**86** (68), **71**–43 (61), **83**–22, **81**–1 (54), **84**–21 (78), 48–**73** (61), 53–**55**, **73**–43 (53); Evening: 8–**99** (66), **66**–61 (66, 61), 0–**111** (111), **130**–0 (130), **91**–31 (51), **74**–1, **130**–0 (124), 0–**89** (82), 35–**90** (90), **86**–29 (86)
**130**	Highest break	111
**2**	Century breaks	1
**9**	50+ breaks	8

== Century breaks ==
A total of 37 century breaks were made during the event. Barry Hawkins completed the tournament's highest break of 142 in the fourth frame of his second round match against John Higgins. The century breaks made during the event is shown below:

- 142, 114, 101 – Barry Hawkins
- 138, 107 – John Higgins
- 136, 135, 123, 111, 107, 104 – Shaun Murphy
- 136, 134, 132, 130, 124, 124, 107, 102 – Ronnie O'Sullivan
- 131 – Kyren Wilson
- 130 – Liang Wenbo
- 129, 115, 107, 101, 101 – Neil Robertson
- 119, 105 – Jack Lisowski
- 117 – Ali Carter
- 111 – David Gilbert
- 109, 103 – Judd Trump
- 107 – Mark Selby
- 102, 100 – Xiao Guodong
- 102 – Yan Bingtao
- 100 – Stuart Bingham
