= Shanghai Masters (snooker) =

Snooker tournament

Tournament information
- Venue: Luwan Indoor Stadium
- Location: Shanghai
- Country: China
- Established: 2007; 19 years ago
- Organisation(s): World Snooker Tour; CBSA
- Format: Non-ranking event
- Total prize fund: £825,000
- Recent edition: 2026
- Current champion: Judd Trump (ENG)

The Shanghai Masters is a professional snooker tournament organised by the World Snooker Tour and the Chinese Billiards and Snooker Association (CBSA) in Shanghai, China. Held as a ranking event from 2007 to 2017, it became a non-ranking invitational tournament in 2018. It features 24 invited players, comprising the top 16 players in the world rankings, the four highest-ranked Chinese players outside the top 16, and four Chinese wildcard players. At the most recent edition in 2025, the winner received £210,000 from a total prize fund of £825,000.

Ronnie O'Sullivan is the most successful player in the tournament's history, having won the title five times, in 2009, 2017, 2018, 2019, and 2023. Four maximum breaks have been made in the history of the event, most recently by Zhang Anda at the 2025 edition. The reigning champion is Judd Trump, who won the 2026 event with an 11–6 victory over Kyren Wilson.

== History ==
The event was introduced in the 2007–2008 season and was the second ranking event to be held in China as a result of the growth of the sport in the country. Until 2016, the first round was preceded by a wildcard round featuring eight players. In 2018, the tournament became a 24-player invitational event.

Following the 2019 edition, the tournament was not held again until 2023, due to the impact of the COVID-19 pandemic.

== Format ==
Since 2018, the tournament has been an invitational event for the top 16 players in the world rankings, the four highest-ranked Chinese players outside the top 16, and four Chinese wildcards. The top eight players in the world rankings are seeded through to the last 16. In the first round, players ranked 9 to 12 play the four highest-ranked Chinese players while players ranked 13 to 16 play the four Chinese wildcards. All matches are played as the best of 11 frames up to the quarter-finals. The semi-finals are the best of 19 frames and the final is the best of 21 frames.

== Winners ==
Year	Winner	Runner-up	Final score	Venue	City	Season
Shanghai Masters (ranking, 2007–2017)
2007	Dominic Dale (WAL)	Ryan Day (WAL)	10–6	Shanghai Indoor Stadium	Shanghai, China	2007/08
2008	Ricky Walden (ENG)	Ronnie O'Sullivan (ENG)	10–8	Shanghai Indoor Stadium	Shanghai, China	2008/09
2009	Ronnie O'Sullivan (ENG)	Liang Wenbo (CHN)	10–5	Shanghai Indoor Stadium	Shanghai, China	2009/10
2010	Ali Carter (ENG)	Jamie Burnett (SCO)	10–7	Shanghai Indoor Stadium	Shanghai, China	2010/11
2011	Mark Selby (ENG)	Mark Williams (WAL)	10–9	Shanghai Indoor Stadium	Shanghai, China	2011/12
2012	John Higgins (SCO)	Judd Trump (ENG)	10–9	Shanghai Indoor Stadium	Shanghai, China	2012/13
2013	Ding Junhui (CHN)	Xiao Guodong (CHN)	10–6	Shanghai Indoor Stadium	Shanghai, China	2013/14
2014	Stuart Bingham (ENG)	Mark Allen (NIR)	10–3	Shanghai Indoor Stadium	Shanghai, China	2014/15
2015	Kyren Wilson (ENG)	Judd Trump (ENG)	10–9	Shanghai Indoor Stadium	Shanghai, China	2015/16
2016	Ding Junhui (CHN)	Mark Selby (ENG)	10–6	Shanghai Indoor Stadium	Shanghai, China	2016/17
2017	Ronnie O'Sullivan (ENG)	Judd Trump (ENG)	10–3	Shanghai Indoor Stadium	Shanghai, China	2017/18
Shanghai Masters (non-ranking, 2018–present)
2018	Ronnie O'Sullivan (ENG)	Barry Hawkins (ENG)	11–9	Regal International East Asia Hotel	Shanghai, China	2018/19
2019	Ronnie O'Sullivan (ENG)	Shaun Murphy (ENG)	11–9	Regal International East Asia Hotel	Shanghai, China	2019/20
2020–2022	Cancelled due to the COVID-19 pandemic					
2023	Ronnie O'Sullivan (ENG)	Luca Brecel (BEL)	11–9	Shanghai Indoor Stadium	Shanghai, China	2023/24
2024	Judd Trump (ENG)	Shaun Murphy (ENG)	11–5	Shanghai Indoor Stadium	Shanghai, China	2024/25
2025	Kyren Wilson (ENG)	Ali Carter (ENG)	11–9	Luwan Indoor Stadium	Shanghai, China	2025/26
2026	Judd Trump (ENG)	Kyren Wilson (ENG)	11–6	Luwan Indoor Stadium	Shanghai, China	2026/27

== Finalists ==
Name	Nationality	Winner	Runner-up	Finals
**Ronnie O'Sullivan**	England	5	1	6
**Judd Trump**	England	2	3	5
**Kyren Wilson**	England	2	1	3
**Ding Junhui**	China	2	0	2
**Ali Carter**	England	1	1	2
**Mark Selby**	England	1	1	2
Dominic Dale	Wales	1	0	1
**Ricky Walden**	England	1	0	1
**John Higgins**	Scotland	1	0	1
**Stuart Bingham**	England	1	0	1
**Shaun Murphy**	England	0	2	2
**Ryan Day**	Wales	0	1	1
Liang Wenbo	China	0	1	1
Jamie Burnett	Scotland	0	1	1
**Mark Williams**	Wales	0	1	1
**Xiao Guodong**	China	0	1	1
**Mark Allen**	Northern Ireland	0	1	1
**Barry Hawkins**	England	0	1	1
**Luca Brecel**	Belgium	0	1	1

Legend
The names of active players are marked in **bold**.
