= 2016 Shanghai Masters =

Bank of Communications OTO Shanghai Masters
Tournament information
- Dates: 19–25 September 2016
- Venue: Shanghai Grand Stage
- City: Shanghai
- Country: China
- Organisation: World Snooker
- Format: Ranking event
- Total prize fund: £465,200
- Winner's share: £85,000
- Highest break: Stephen Maguire (SCO) (147)

Final
- Champion: Ding Junhui (CHN)
- Runner-up: Mark Selby (ENG)
- Score: 10–6

The 2016 Bank of Communications OTO Shanghai Masters was a professional ranking snooker tournament that took place between 19 and 25 September 2016 at the Shanghai Grand Stage in Shanghai, China. The 10th edition of the tournament since it was first held in 2007, it was the fifth ranking event of the 2016/2017 season.

Kyren Wilson was the defending champion, but he lost 2–5 to Michael Holt in the last 32.

Stephen Maguire made the 120th official maximum break in the third frame of his wildcard round match against Xu Yichen. It was Maguire's third professional maximum break.

Ding Junhui won the 12th ranking title of his career, defeating Mark Selby 10–6 in the final. He also became the first second-time winner in the history of the event.

== Prize fund ==
The breakdown of prize money from this year is shown below:

- Winner: £85,000
- Runner-up: £35,000
- Semi-final: £19,500
- Quarter-final: £12,000
- Last 16: £8,000
- Last 32: £6,000
- Last 48: £3,000
- Last 64: £2,000
- Last 96: £500
- Non-televised highest break: £200
- Televised highest break: £2,000
- Total: £465,200

The "rolling 147 prize" for a maximum break stood at £5,000 for the televised stage and at £10,500 for the qualifiers.

== Wildcard round ==
These matches were played in Shanghai on 19 and 20 September 2016.

Match		Score	
WC1	Michael Holt (ENG)	5–1	Xu Si (CHN)
WC2	Liang Wenbo (CHN)	5–3	Hu Hao (CHN)
WC3	Anthony McGill (SCO)	5–0	Chen Zifan (CHN)
WC4	Stephen Maguire (SCO)	5–0	Xu Yichen (CHN)
WC5	Kurt Maflin (NOR)	5–1	Guan Zhen (CHN)
WC6	Ryan Day (WAL)	5–1	Ma Bing (CHN)
WC7	Stuart Carrington (ENG)	5–1	Niu Zhuang (CHN)
WC8	Martin Gould (ENG)	0–5	Yuan Sijun (CHN)

== Main draw ==
Last 32; Best of 9 frames
1	(England) Kyren Wilson	2
(England) Michael Holt	5
11	(England) Ronnie O'Sullivan	5
(China) Liang Wenbo	4
10	(China) Ding Junhui	5
(Scotland) Scott Donaldson	4
7	(Northern Ireland) Mark Allen	5
(Scotland) Anthony McGill	0
5	(England) Judd Trump	5
(England) Ben Woollaston	0
9	(England) Ricky Walden	4
(Wales) Michael White	5
15	(England) Barry Hawkins	5
(England) Robert Milkins	0
4	(England) Shaun Murphy	0
(Scotland) Stephen Maguire	5
3	(England) Stuart Bingham	5
(Wales) Jamie Jones	0
14	(Hong Kong) Marco Fu	4
(England) David Gilbert	5
16	(England) Ali Carter	5
(Norway) Kurt Maflin	1
6	(Scotland) John Higgins	5
(England) Matthew Selt	3
8	(Australia) Neil Robertson	2
(Wales) Ryan Day	5
13	(Wales) Mark Williams	3
(China) Mei Xiwen	5
12	(England) Joe Perry	4
(England) Stuart Carrington	5
2	(England) Mark Selby	5
(China) Yuan Sijun	1

Last 16; Best of 9 frames
(England) Michael Holt	5
11	(England) Ronnie O'Sullivan	2
10	(China) Ding Junhui	5
7	(Northern Ireland) Mark Allen	2
5	(England) Judd Trump	3
(Wales) Michael White	5
15	(England) Barry Hawkins	3
(Scotland) Stephen Maguire	5
3	(England) Stuart Bingham	5
(England) David Gilbert	2
16	(England) Ali Carter	5
6	(Scotland) John Higgins	2
(Wales) Ryan Day	5
(China) Mei Xiwen	2
(England) Stuart Carrington	3
2	(England) Mark Selby	5

Quarter-finals; Best of 9 frames
(England) Michael Holt	3
10	(China) Ding Junhui	5
(Wales) Michael White	1
(Scotland) Stephen Maguire	5
3	(England) Stuart Bingham	5
16	(England) Ali Carter	1
(Wales) Ryan Day	3
2	(England) Mark Selby	5

Semi-finals; Best of 11 frames
10	(China) Ding Junhui	6
(Scotland) Stephen Maguire	3
3	(England) Stuart Bingham	5
2	(England) Mark Selby	6

Final; Best of 19 frames
10	(China) Ding Junhui	10
2	(England) Mark Selby	6

== Final ==
Final: Best of 19 frames. Referee: Zheng Weili. Shanghai Grand Stage, Shanghai, China, 25 September 2016.
Ding Junhui (10); China	10–6	Mark Selby (2); England
Afternoon: 14–74 (74), 115–0 (115), 33–82, 15–108 (108), 87–29, 98–31 (53), 80–1 (59), 86–0 (52), 75–17 (75); Evening: 0–76 (76), 0–102 (102), 0–97 (53), 100–0 (97), 98–0 (52), 84–15 (63), 72–24
115	Highest break	108
1	Century breaks	2
8	50+ breaks	5

== Qualifying ==
These matches were played between 30 August and 2 September 2016 at the Barnsley Metrodome in Barnsley, England. All matches were best of 9 frames.

Last 128; Best of 9 frames
(England) Sean O'Sullivan	5
(Thailand) Boonyarit Keattikun	3
(Pakistan) Hamza Akbar	5
(England) Zak Surety	4
(China) Zhang Anda	5
(India) Aditya Mehta	0
(Wales) Lee Walker	5
(England) Peter Lines	4
(Wales) Daniel Wells	5
(England) Jimmy White	2
(England) John Astley	4
(Scotland) Scott Donaldson	5
(England) Paul Davison	5
(Poland) Adam Stefanow	4
(Malaysia) Rory Thor	5
(England) Christopher Keogan	3
(England) Michael Wild	2
(China) Chen Zhe	5
(China) Zhao Xintong	5
(England) Liam Highfield	1
(Scotland) Ross Muir	5
(England) Jason Weston	2
(England) Sam Craigie	3
(England) Andy Hicks	5
(China) Wang Yuchen	1
(England) Adam Duffy	5
(England) Sydney Wilson	1
(Thailand) James Wattana	5
(Scotland) Eden Sharav	5
(China) Fang Xiongman	0
(China) Cao Yupeng	1
(England) Craig Steadman	5
(England) James Cahill	3
(England) Jamie Curtis-Barrett	5
(England) Allan Taylor	5
(Egypt) Hatem Yassen	3
(Isle of Man) Darryl Hill	1
(Wales) Ian Preece	5
(England) Chris Wakelin	5
(Republic of Ireland) Josh Boileau	2
(Thailand) Sunny Akani	5
(Malta) Alex Borg	4
(Thailand) Noppon Saengkham	0
(China) Yan Bingtao	5
(China) Zhang Yong	5
(Scotland) Fraser Patrick	2
(England) Hammad Miah	5
(Australia) Kurt Dunham	3
(England) Jamie Cope	5
(Scotland) Marc Davis	1
(England) Anthony Hamilton	4
(Thailand) Kritsanut Lertsattayathorn	5
(Scotland) Rhys Clark	5
(England) Elliot Slessor	2
(England) Sanderson Lam	2
(China) Mei Xiwen	5
(Wales) Gareth Allen	5
(England) Brandon Sargeant	2
(Cyprus) Michael Georgiou	5
(England) Mitchell Mann	0
(England) Martin O'Donnell	5
(Brazil) Itaro Santos	0
(Wales) Duane Jones	5
(Wales) David John	3

Last 96; Best of 9 frames
(England) Robbie Williams	5
(England) Sean O'Sullivan	3
(England) Mark King	5
(Pakistan) Hamza Akbar	4
(Finland) Robin Hull	4
(China) Zhang Anda	5
(Thailand) Dechawat Poomjaeng	5
(Wales) Lee Walker	0
(England) Tom Ford	4
(Wales) Daniel Wells	5
(England) Alfie Burden	1
(Scotland) Scott Donaldson	5
(China) Zhou Yuelong	3
(England) Paul Davison	5
(England) Oliver Lines	4
(Malaysia) Rory Thor	5
(England) Jack Lisowski	5
(China) Chen Zhe	3
(Northern Ireland) Joe Swail	2
(China) Zhao Xintong	5
(England) Jimmy Robertson	5
(Scotland) Ross Muir	1
(China) Xiao Guodong	5
(England) Andy Hicks	1
(Thailand) Thepchaiya Un-Nooh	2
(England) Adam Duffy	5
(England) Mark Joyce	5
(Thailand) James Wattana	3
(England) Andrew Higginson	5
(Scotland) Eden Sharav	4
(China) Li Hang	5
(England) Craig Steadman	0
(Wales) Jamie Jones	5
(England) Jamie Curtis-Barrett	3
(Republic of Ireland) Fergal O'Brien	5
(England) Allan Taylor	2
(China) Yu Delu	3
(Wales) Ian Preece	5
(England) Ian Burns	2
(England) Chris Wakelin	5
(England) Rod Lawler	5
(Thailand) Sunny Akani	4
(Norway) Kurt Maflin	5
(China) Yan Bingtao	4
(England) Rory McLeod	5
(China) Zhang Yong	1
(China) Tian Pengfei	2
(England) Hammad Miah	5
(England) Nigel Bond	5
(England) Jamie Cope	1
(England) Sam Baird	1
(Thailand) Kritsanut Lertsattayathorn	5
(Wales) Dominic Dale	5
(Scotland) Rhys Clark	3
(England) Gary Wilson	3
(China) Mei Xiwen	5
(Republic of Ireland) Ken Doherty	3
(Wales) Gareth Allen	5
(England) Stuart Carrington	5
(Cyprus) Michael Georgiou	3
(England) Mike Dunn	1
(England) Martin O'Donnell	5
(Wales) Matthew Stevens	5
(Wales) Duane Jones	4

Last 64; Best of 9 frames
(England) Robbie Williams	3
(England) Mark King	5
(China) Zhang Anda	5
(Thailand) Dechawat Poomjaeng	1
(Wales) Daniel Wells	3
(Scotland) Scott Donaldson	5
(England) Paul Davison	5
(Malaysia) Rory Thor	3
(England) Jack Lisowski	5
(China) Zhao Xintong	4
(England) Jimmy Robertson	w/o
(China) Xiao Guodong	w/d
(England) Adam Duffy	5
(England) Mark Joyce	4
(England) Andrew Higginson	5
(China) Li Hang	2
(Wales) Jamie Jones	5
(Republic of Ireland) Fergal O'Brien	0
(Wales) Ian Preece	5
(England) Chris Wakelin	2
(England) Rod Lawler	0
(Norway) Kurt Maflin	5
(England) Rory McLeod	4
(England) Hammad Miah	5
(England) Nigel Bond	5
(Thailand) Kritsanut Lertsattayathorn	2
(Wales) Dominic Dale	1
(China) Mei Xiwen	5
(Wales) Gareth Allen	2
(England) Stuart Carrington	5
(England) Martin O'Donnell	3
(Wales) Matthew Stevens	5

Last 48; Best of 9 frames
(England) Michael Holt	5
(England) Mark King	2
(China) Liang Wenbo	5
(China) Zhang Anda	4
(England) Peter Ebdon	4
(Scotland) Scott Donaldson	5
(Scotland) Anthony McGill	5
(England) Paul Davison	0
(England) Ben Woollaston	5
(England) Jack Lisowski	4
(Wales) Michael White	5
(England) Jimmy Robertson	4
(England) Robert Milkins	5
(England) Adam Duffy	4
(Scotland) Stephen Maguire	5
(England) Andrew Higginson	2
(Scotland) Alan McManus	4
(Wales) Jamie Jones	5
(England) David Gilbert	5
(Wales) Ian Preece	2
(England) Mark Davis	4
(Norway) Kurt Maflin	5
(England) Matthew Selt	5
(England) Hammad Miah	0
(Wales) Ryan Day	5
(England) Nigel Bond	1
(Scotland) Graeme Dott	0
(China) Mei Xiwen	5
(Belgium) Luca Brecel	4
(England) Stuart Carrington	5
(England) Martin Gould	5
(Wales) Matthew Stevens	0

== Century breaks ==
=== Qualifying stage centuries ===
- 136, 110 – Michael Holt
- 134, 117 – Jamie Curtis-Barrett
- 134 – Sam Craigie
- 130 – Jack Lisowski
- 128, 118 – Stuart Carrington
- 128 – Hamza Akbar
- 127, 102 – Zhang Anda
- 123 – Kurt Maflin
- 119, 102 – Jamie Jones
- 118 – Matthew Selt
- 116, 103 – Thor Chuan Leong
- 116 – Andrew Higginson
- 115 – Robin Hull
- 114 – Dominic Dale
- 108, 100 – Mei Xiwen
- 104 – Ian Preece
- 104 – Ross Muir
- 103 – Stephen Maguire
- 103 – Jamie Cope
- 101 – Adam Duffy
- 101 – Zhao Xintong

=== Televised stage centuries ===
- 147, 130, 121, 104 – Stephen Maguire
- 141, 135, 100 – Stuart Carrington
- 133 – Anthony McGill
- 124, 123, 112 – Stuart Bingham
- 120, 108, 102 – Mark Selby
- 119 – Marco Fu
- 117, 115 – David Gilbert
- 117 – Mei Xiwen
- 115, 103 – Ding Junhui
- 113, 101 – Michael White
- 111, 100 – Yuan Sijun
- 108, 107, 107, 102 – Ryan Day
- 107, 103, 101 – Michael Holt
- 104 – Ali Carter
- 101 – Kyren Wilson
- 100 – John Higgins
