= 2018 Shanghai Masters =

Shanghai Masters
Tournament information
- Dates: 10–16 September 2018
- Venue: Regal International East Asia Hotel
- City: Shanghai
- Country: China
- Organisation: WPBSA
- Format: Non-ranking event
- Total prize fund: £725,000
- Winner's share: £200,000
- Highest break: (England) Ronnie O'Sullivan (140) (England) Stuart Bingham (140)

Final
- Champion: (England) Ronnie O'Sullivan
- Runner-up: (England) Barry Hawkins
- Score: 11–9

The 2018 Shanghai Masters was a professional snooker tournament that took place in Shanghai, China from 10 to 16 September. The 12th edition of the tournament since it was first held in 2007, it was the first to be staged as a 24-player non-ranking invitational event; previous editions of the Shanghai Masters had been held as ranking events.

Ronnie O'Sullivan successfully defended the title by beating Barry Hawkins 11–9 in the final. With this win O'Sullivan became the first player to surpass £10 million in career prize money.

== Field ==
The 24 players were the top-16 in the world rankings after the 2018 World Open, the next four players, outside the top-16 in the world rankings, of Chinese origin, two players from the CBSA under-21 rankings and two from China's Amateur Masters series. The Amateur Masters was won by Pu Qingsong with Guo Hua the runner-up. The two players from the CBSA under-21 rankings were Chang Bingyu and Fan Zhengyi.

Defending champion Ronnie O'Sullivan was the number 1 seed with World Champion Mark Williams seeded 2. The top 8 seeds received byes into the second round.

Shaun Murphy, the 8 seed and thus a first round bye, withdrew before the start of the tournament for family reasons. First round winner Stuart Bingham was credited with the walkover second round victory.

== Prize fund ==
The breakdown of prize money is shown below:

- Winner: £200,000
- Runner-up: £100,000
- Semi-finals: £60,000
- Quarter-finals: £30,000
- Last 16: £15,000
- Last 24: £7,500
- Highest break: £5,000
- Total: £725,000

== Main draw ==
Round 1 Best of 11 frames
10 | (Australia) Neil Robertson | 6
(China) Guo Hua | 1
12 | (England) Stuart Bingham | 6
(China) Fan Zhengyi | 0
9 | (England) Kyren Wilson | 6
(China) Liang Wenbo | 3
15 | (Wales) Ryan Day | 6
(China) Chang Bingyu | 2
13 | (Belgium) Luca Brecel | 4
(China) Zhou Yuelong | 6
11 | (Northern Ireland) Mark Allen | 6
(China) Xiao Guodong | 4
14 | (Scotland) Stephen Maguire | 6
(China) Pu QingSong | 4
16 | (Scotland) Anthony McGill | 6
(China) Yan Bingtao | 2

Round 2 Best of 11 frames
1 | (England) Ronnie O'Sullivan | 6
10 | (Australia) Neil Robertson | 3
8 | (England) Shaun Murphy | w/d
12 | (England) Stuart Bingham | w/o
5 | (England) Judd Trump | 2
9 | (England) Kyren Wilson | 6
4 | (Scotland) John Higgins | 5
15 | (Wales) Ryan Day | 6
3 | (England) Mark Selby | 6
(China) Zhou Yuelong | 5
6 | (China) Ding Junhui | 6
11 | (Northern Ireland) Mark Allen | 3
7 | (England) Barry Hawkins | 6
14 | (Scotland) Stephen Maguire | 3
2 | (Wales) Mark Williams | 6
16 | (Scotland) Anthony McGill | 3

Quarter-finals; Best of 11 frames
1 | (England) Ronnie O'Sullivan | 6
12 | (England) Stuart Bingham | 2
9 | (England) Kyren Wilson | 6
15 | (Wales) Ryan Day | 5
3 | (England) Mark Selby | 5
6 | (China) Ding Junhui | 6
7 | (England) Barry Hawkins | 6
2 | (Wales) Mark Williams | 4

Semi-finals; Best of 19 frames
1 | (England) Ronnie O'Sullivan | 10
9 | (England) Kyren Wilson | 6
6 | (China) Ding Junhui | 9
7 | (England) Barry Hawkins | 10

Final; Best of 21 frames
1 | (England) Ronnie O'Sullivan | 11
7 | (England) Barry Hawkins | 9

== Final ==
Final: Best of 21 frames. Referee: Zheng Weili. Regal International East Asia Hotel, Shanghai, China, 16 September 2018.
| Ronnie O'Sullivan (1); England | 11–9 | Barry Hawkins (7); England |
Afternoon: 1–125 (125), 23–66, 85–5 (85), 0–97 (55), 101–0 (93), 89–35 (66), 0–132 (132), 33–61, 93–29 (68), 5–63 (63); Evening: 73–0, 134–1 (64, 61), 56–3 (56), 113–0 (113), 26–97 (83), 83–24 (83), 63–14, 14–57, 0–90 (74), 122–0 (122)
| 122 | Highest break | 132 |
| 2 | Century breaks | 2 |
| 10 | 50+ breaks | 6 |

== Century breaks ==
Total: 37

- 140, 135, 122, 113, 111 – Ronnie O'Sullivan
- 140, 134 – Stuart Bingham
- 138, 101, 100 – Ding Junhui
- 138 – Luca Brecel
- 136 – John Higgins
- 135, 131, 114, 100 – Kyren Wilson
- 134, 132, 125, 114, 103, 101, 100 – Barry Hawkins
- 134, 110, 100 – Anthony McGill
- 133 – Yan Bingtao
- 130, 100 – Ryan Day
- 128 – Judd Trump
- 128 – Liang Wenbo
- 114, 113 – Stephen Maguire
- 107, 103 – Neil Robertson
- 103 – Mark Williams
- 102 – Mark Allen
