= 2007 Shanghai Masters =

Shanghai Masters

Tournament information
- Dates: 6–12 August 2007
- Venue: Shanghai Grand Stage
- City: Shanghai
- Country: China
- Organisation: WPBSA
- Format: Ranking event
- Total prize fund: £250,000
- Winner's share: £48,000
- Highest break: Dominic Dale (WAL) (143)

Final
- Champion: Dominic Dale (WAL)
- Runner-up: Ryan Day (WAL)
- Score: 10–6

The 2007 Shanghai Masters was the inaugural edition of the Shanghai Masters snooker tournament and the first ranking event of the 2007/2008 season. It took place between 6–12 August 2007 at the Shanghai Grand Stage in Shanghai, China.

Dominic Dale won in the final 10–6 against Ryan Day.

== Tournament summary ==
- Ronnie O'Sullivan withdrew from the event due to back problems that prevented him from travelling or playing.
- Matthew Stevens went 0–4 down to Stephen Maguire, but took the next 5 frames to win 5–4.
- Dominic Dale won 8 consecutive frames in the final, claiming victory from trailing 2–6. He also dyed his hair blonde halfway through the tournament because he saw the style in a barbershop in Shanghai.

== Prize fund ==
The breakdown of prize money for this year is shown below:

- Winner: £48,000
- Runner-up: £22,500
- Semi-final: £12,000
- Quarter-final: £6,500
- Last 16: £4,275
- Last 32: £2,750
- Last 48: £1,725
- Last 64: £1,325
- Stage one highest break: £500
- Stage two highest break: £2,000
- Stage one maximum break: £1,000
- Stage two maximum break: £20,000
- Total: £250,000

== Wildcard round ==
A wildcard round was held on the opening day of the tournament before the first round proper to allow eight Chinese players to display their abilities. Matches in this round were best of 9 frames.

Match		Score	
WC1	Scott MacKenzie (SCO)	4–5	Yang Qingtian (CHN)
WC2	Stuart Pettman (ENG)	5–0	Cao Kaisheng (CHN)
WC3	Fergal O'Brien (IRL)	5–1	Cao Xinlong (CHN)
WC4	Adrian Gunnell (ENG)	5–2	Jin Long (CHN)
WC5	Dominic Dale (WAL)	5–1	Liu Chuang (CHN)
WC6	Tony Drago (MLT)	5–2	Ah Bulajiang (CHN)
WC7	Michael Judge (IRL)	2–5	Xiao Guodong (CHN)
WC8	Mike Dunn (ENG)	3–5	Yu Delu (CHN)

== Main draw ==
Last 32; Best of 9 frames
1	(Scotland) John Higgins	5
(England) Jamie Cope	2
11	(England) Mark Selby	5
(China) Yang Qingtian	0
12	(Wales) Mark Williams	2
(England) Stuart Bingham	5
5	(England) Ronnie O'Sullivan	w/d
(England) Stuart Pettman	w/o
6	(England) Peter Ebdon	3
(England) Dave Harold	5
15	(England) Steve Davis	5
(Republic of Ireland) Fergal O'Brien	4
14	(England) Ali Carter	1
(England) Adrian Gunnell	5
4	(Republic of Ireland) Ken Doherty	3
(Wales) Dominic Dale	5
3	(England) Shaun Murphy	2
(England) Ian McCulloch	5
16	(Wales) Ryan Day	5
(Malta) Tony Drago	1
10	(Scotland) Stephen Maguire	5
(China) Xiao Guodong	1
7	(Australia) Neil Robertson	0
(Wales) Matthew Stevens	5
8	(Scotland) Stephen Hendry	5
(England) Nigel Bond	2
13	(England) Stephen Lee	5
(Hong Kong) Marco Fu	4
9	(China) Ding Junhui	5
(China) Yu Delu	2
2	(Scotland) Graeme Dott	5
(England) Michael Holt	4

Last 16; Best of 9 frames
1	(Scotland) John Higgins	3
11	(England) Mark Selby	5
(England) Stuart Bingham	5
(England) Stuart Pettman	4
(England) Dave Harold	5
15	(England) Steve Davis	1
(England) Adrian Gunnell	1
(Wales) Dominic Dale	5
(England) Ian McCulloch	3
16	(Wales) Ryan Day	5
10	(Scotland) Stephen Maguire	4
(Wales) Matthew Stevens	5
8	(Scotland) Stephen Hendry	3
13	(England) Stephen Lee	5
9	(China) Ding Junhui	1
2	(Scotland) Graeme Dott	5

Quarter-finals; Best of 9 frames
11	(England) Mark Selby	5
(England) Stuart Bingham	0
(England) Dave Harold	1
(Wales) Dominic Dale	5
16	(Wales) Ryan Day	5
(Wales) Matthew Stevens	4
13	(England) Stephen Lee	4
2	(Scotland) Graeme Dott	5

Semi-finals; Best of 11 frames
11	(England) Mark Selby	3
(Wales) Dominic Dale	6
16	(Wales) Ryan Day	6
2	(Scotland) Graeme Dott	2

Final; Best of 19 frames
(Wales) Dominic Dale	10
16	(Wales) Ryan Day	6

== Final ==
Final: Best of 19 frames. Referee: Johan Oomen. Shanghai Grand Stage, Shanghai, China, 12 August 2007.
Dominic Dale; Wales	10–6	Ryan Day; Wales
Afternoon: 32–105 (105), 71–33, 94–0 (54), 6–118 (115), 0–77 (76), 21–65 (53), 47–75 (74), 48–81 (59), 84–0 (84); Evening: 143–4 (143), 65–33, 68–8, 79–0, 61–23, 90–0, 56–7
143	Highest break	115
1	Century breaks	2
3	50+ breaks	6

== Qualifying ==
Qualifying rounds for the Shanghai Masters took place at Pontin's, Prestatyn, Wales, between 26 and 29 June 2007.

Round 1 Best of 9 frames

== Century breaks ==
=== Main stage centuries ===
- 143, 127, 116, 102 – Dominic Dale
- 133, 123 – Ian McCulloch
- 131, 104 – Mark Selby
- 126 – Adrian Gunnell
- 124, 106 – Stephen Maguire
- 115, 106, 105, 103 – Ryan Day
- 108 – Stuart Bingham
- 102 – Michael Holt
- 101 – Shaun Murphy

=== Qualifying stage centuries ===
- 140 – Dave Harold
- 138 – Fergal O'Brien
- 137 – Barry Pinches
- 136 – Patrick Wallace
- 136 – David Roe
- 133 – Ricky Walden
- 131 – Alfie Burden
- 130 – Scott MacKenzie
- 129, 101 – Dominic Dale
- 128, 127 – Supoj Saenla
- 127 – Rory McLeod
- 123 – David Gilbert
- 122 – Robert Milkins
- 116 – Tony Drago
- 115, 103 – Jamie Burnett
- 115 – Marco Fu
- 112 – Adrian Gunnell
- 110 – Matthew Stevens
- 110 –Jimmy White
- 109, 101 – David Gray
- 105, 103 – Judd Trump
- 105 – Jamie Cope
- 103, 103 – Michael Judge
- 103 – Joe Perry
- 102 – Jamie O'Neill
- 101 – Stuart Pettman
