= 2017 Shanghai Masters =

Shanghai Masters
Tournament information
- Dates: 13–18 November 2017
- Venue: Shanghai Grand Stage
- City: Shanghai
- Country: China
- Organisation: World Snooker
- Format: Ranking event
- Total prize fund: £700,000
- Winner's share: £150,000
- Highest break: Ronnie O'Sullivan (ENG) (144)

Final
- Champion: Ronnie O'Sullivan (ENG)
- Runner-up: Judd Trump (ENG)
- Score: 10–3

The 2017 Juss Sports Shanghai Masters was a professional ranking snooker tournament that took place in Shanghai, China. The 11th edition of the tournament since it was first held in 2007, it was the ninth ranking event of the 2017/2018 season. Qualifying took place from 11 to 13 October at the Robin Park Arena and Sports Centre in Wigan.

Ding Junhui was the defending champion, but he withdrew from the tournament due to an eye infection. Judd Trump won 20 consecutive frames in four matches before losing 3 frames to Jack Lisowski in the semi-finals. Ronnie O'Sullivan captured his second Shanghai Masters title and the 30th ranking title of his career by beating Trump 10–3 in the final.

The 2017 edition of the event marked the last time the Shanghai Masters was staged as a ranking tournament. The following year, it became a non-ranking invitational tournament for 24 players.

== Prize fund ==
The breakdown of prize money for this year is shown below:

- Winner: £150,000
- Runner-up: £75,000
- Semi-final: £32,000
- Quarter-final: £18,000
- Last 16: £12,000
- Last 32: £7,000
- Last 64: £4,000
- Televised highest break: £3,000
- Total: £700,000

The "rolling 147 prize" for a maximum break stood at £5,000

== Main draw ==
Last 64; Best of 9 frames
(China) Mei Xiwen	5
(England) Adam Duffy	4
(England) Tom Ford	4
(England) Jimmy Robertson	5
(Wales) Lee Walker	4
(Norway) Kurt Maflin	5
(Wales) Ryan Day	4
(China) Yu Delu	5
(Republic of Ireland) Fergal O'Brien	5
(England) Mitchell Mann	4
(China) Yan Bingtao	1
(Northern Ireland) Mark Allen	5
(China) Cao Yupeng	5
(England) Michael Holt	0
(England) Jack Lisowski	5
(Scotland) Chris Totten	1
(China) Yuan Sijun	4
(England) Robbie Williams	5
(Scotland) Graeme Dott	5
(China) Xiao Guodong	3
(Belgium) Luca Brecel	5
(Wales) Matthew Stevens	0
(England) Mark King	2
(Wales) Jamie Jones	5
(England) Rory McLeod	4
(Scotland) Stephen Maguire	5
(England) Stuart Carrington	3
(England) Ali Carter	5
(Cyprus) Michael Georgiou	3
(England) Ben Woollaston	5
(England) Alfie Burden	0
(England) Judd Trump	5
(Scotland) John Higgins	5
(Wales) Ian Preece	1
(China) Zhou Yuelong	5
(England) Sanderson Lam	4
(China) Liang Wenbo	5
(England) John Astley	2
(England) David Gilbert	5
(England) Mark Joyce	0
(China) Li Yuan	0
(England) Martin Gould	5
(Thailand) Sunny Akani	w/o
(England) Stuart Bingham	(Note: On 24 October 2017, Bingham was banned for 6 months due to betting breaches.)
(England) Robert Milkins	5
(China) Lyu Haotian	4
(Iran) Hossein Vafaei	0
(Hong Kong) Marco Fu	5
(England) Barry Hawkins	5
(Wales) Daniel Wells	2
(Wales) Michael White	5
(England) Mark Davis	4
(England) Ronnie O'Sullivan	5
(England) Gary Wilson	2
(England) Joe Perry	5
(England) Matthew Selt	1
(China) Wang Yuchen	1
(Wales) Mark Williams	5
(Iran) Soheil Vahedi	3
(Northern Ireland) Gerard Greene	5
(Wales) Dominic Dale	4
(Scotland) Alan McManus	5
(England) Chris Wakelin	4
(England) Mark Selby	5

Last 32; Best of 9 frames
(China) Mei Xiwen	5
(England) Jimmy Robertson	3
(Norway) Kurt Maflin	5
(China) Yu Delu	3
(Republic of Ireland) Fergal O'Brien	0
(Northern Ireland) Mark Allen	5
(China) Cao Yupeng	4
(England) Jack Lisowski	5
(England) Robbie Williams	2
(Scotland) Graeme Dott	5
(Belgium) Luca Brecel	5
(Wales) Jamie Jones	0
(Scotland) Stephen Maguire	5
(England) Ali Carter	4
(England) Ben Woollaston	0
(England) Judd Trump	5
(Scotland) John Higgins	5
(China) Zhou Yuelong	1
(China) Liang Wenbo	5
(England) David Gilbert	0
(England) Martin Gould	5
(Thailand) Sunny Akani	0
(England) Robert Milkins	3
(Hong Kong) Marco Fu	5
(England) Barry Hawkins	5
(Wales) Michael White	3
(England) Ronnie O'Sullivan	5
(England) Joe Perry	1
(Wales) Mark Williams	5
(Northern Ireland) Gerard Greene	0
(Scotland) Alan McManus	4
(England) Mark Selby	5

Last 16; Best of 9 frames
(China) Mei Xiwen	2
(Norway) Kurt Maflin	5
(Northern Ireland) Mark Allen	4
(England) Jack Lisowski	5
(Scotland) Graeme Dott	4
(Belgium) Luca Brecel	5
(Scotland) Stephen Maguire	0
(England) Judd Trump	5
(Scotland) John Higgins	5
(China) Liang Wenbo	2
(England) Martin Gould	5
(Hong Kong) Marco Fu	2
(England) Barry Hawkins	0
(England) Ronnie O'Sullivan	5
(Wales) Mark Williams	5
(England) Mark Selby	3

Quarter-finals; Best of 9 frames
(Norway) Kurt Maflin	3
(England) Jack Lisowski	5
(Belgium) Luca Brecel	0
(England) Judd Trump	5
(Scotland) John Higgins	5
(England) Martin Gould	1
(England) Ronnie O'Sullivan	5
(Wales) Mark Williams	1

Semi-finals; Best of 11 frames
(England) Jack Lisowski	3
(England) Judd Trump	6
(Scotland) John Higgins	2
(England) Ronnie O'Sullivan	6

Final; Best of 19 frames
(England) Judd Trump	3
(England) Ronnie O'Sullivan	10

== Final ==
Final: Best of 19 frames. Referee: Peggy Li. Shanghai Grand Stage, Shanghai, China, 18 November 2017.
Judd Trump; England	3–10	Ronnie O'Sullivan; England
Afternoon: 15–77, 0–95 (91), 31–49, 0–93 (76), 9–81 (81), 42–101 (56), 48–70 (70), 102–17 (102), 62–45; Evening: 0–108 (108), 67–33 (64), 63–65 (Trump 63), 42–68
102	Highest break	108
1	Century breaks	1
3	50+ breaks	6

== Qualifying ==
These matches were played between 11 and 13 October 2017 at the Robin Park Arena and Sports Centre in Wigan, England. All matches were the best of 9 frames.

=== Round 1 ===
(England) Billy Joe Castle	5–2 (Note: Match held over and played in Shanghai.)	(China) Zhang Jiankang (Note: Wildcard)
(China) Li Zhen	3–5	(China) Chen Feilong

(Iran) Soheil Vahedi	5–2	(China) Ma Chunmao

=== Round 2 ===
(China) Ding Junhui	w/d–w/o	(China) Mei Xiwen
(Thailand) Noppon Saengkham	4–5	(England) Adam Duffy
(England) Tom Ford	5–0	(China) Chen Zifan
(England) Jimmy Robertson	5–2	(England) Ashley Hugill
(Scotland) Anthony McGill	1–5	(Wales) Lee Walker
(Norway) Kurt Maflin	5–4	(England) Peter Lines
(Wales) Ryan Day	5–1	(Republic of Ireland) Josh Boileau
(China) Yu Delu	5–1	(England) Sean O'Sullivan
(Republic of Ireland) Fergal O'Brien	5–1	(Wales) Duane Jones
(England) Ricky Walden	3–5	(England) Mitchell Mann
(China) Yan Bingtao	5–0	(Scotland) Eden Sharav
(Northern Ireland) Mark Allen	5–3	(China) Zhang Yong
(England) Peter Ebdon	3–5	(China) Cao Yupeng
(England) Michael Holt	5–0	(China) Xu Si
(England) Jack Lisowski	5–1	(England) Jimmy White
(Australia) Neil Robertson	2–5	(Scotland) Chris Totten
(England) Shaun Murphy	4–5	(China) Yuan Sijun
(England) Robbie Williams	5–3	(Scotland) Rhys Clark
(Scotland) Graeme Dott	5–3	(England) Nigel Bond
(China) Xiao Guodong	5–1	(India) Aditya Mehta
(Belgium) Luca Brecel	5–0	(Wales) Jak Jones
(Wales) Matthew Stevens	5–4	(China) Fang Xiongman
(England) Mark King	5–2	(Australia) Matthew Bolton
(Wales) Jamie Jones	5–1	(England) Martin O'Donnell
(England) Rory McLeod	5–4	(England) Billy Joe Castle
(Scotland) Stephen Maguire	5–1	(Malaysia) Thor Chuan Leong
(England) Stuart Carrington	5–3	(China) Chen Feilong
(England) Ali Carter	5–4	(England) Sam Craigie
(China) Li Hang	2–5	(Cyprus) Michael Georgiou
(England) Ben Woollaston	5–0	(Australia) Kurt Dunham
(England) Alfie Burden	5–4	(Pakistan) Hamza Akbar
(England) Judd Trump	5–2	(Northern Ireland) Joe Swail

(Scotland) John Higgins	5–2	(Switzerland) Alexander Ursenbacher
(England) Oliver Lines	4–5	(Wales) Ian Preece
(China) Zhou Yuelong	5–1	(Scotland) Scott Donaldson
(Thailand) Thepchaiya Un-Nooh	2–5	(England) Sanderson Lam
(China) Liang Wenbo	5–2	(England) Rod Lawler
(China) Tian Pengfei	4–5	(England) John Astley
(England) David Gilbert	5–4	(Malta) Alex Borg
(England) Mark Joyce	5–4	(China) Zhang Anda
(England) Mike Dunn	0–5	(China) Li Yuan
(England) Martin Gould	5–3	(England) Allan Taylor
(England) Andrew Higginson	4–5	(Thailand) Sunny Akani
(England) Stuart Bingham	5–1	(Germany) Lukas Kleckers
(England) Robert Milkins	5–2	(England) Paul Davison
(England) Anthony Hamilton	0–5	(China) Lyu Haotian
(Iran) Hossein Vafaei	5–4	(England) Elliot Slessor
(Hong Kong) Marco Fu	5–1	(Thailand) Boonyarit Keattikun
(England) Barry Hawkins	5–3	(China) Chen Zhe
(Wales) Daniel Wells	5–0	(Finland) Robin Hull
(Wales) Michael White	5–1	(England) Jamie Curtis-Barrett
(England) Mark Davis	5–1	(Scotland) Ross Muir
(England) Ronnie O'Sullivan	5–0	(England) Christopher Keogan
(England) Gary Wilson	5–2	(China) Zhao Xintong
(England) Joe Perry	5–3	(England) Liam Highfield
(England) Matthew Selt	5–3	(England) Craig Steadman
(England) David Grace	1–5	(China) Wang Yuchen
(Wales) Mark Williams	5–2	(China) Niu Zhuang
(England) Sam Baird	4–5	(Iran) Soheil Vahedi
(England) Kyren Wilson	3–5	(Northern Ireland) Gerard Greene
(Wales) Dominic Dale	5–0	(Republic of Ireland) Leo Fernandez
(Scotland) Alan McManus	5–4	(England) Hammad Miah
(England) Chris Wakelin	5–3	(Thailand) James Wattana
(England) Mark Selby	5–2	(England) Ian Burns

== Century breaks ==
=== Qualifying stage centuries ===
Total: 37

- 142 – Joe Perry
- 141, 128 – Sam Craigie
- 140 – Michael Georgiou
- 137, 121 – Jack Lisowski
- 132, 109 – Tom Ford
- 131 – Mark King
- 129, 112, 109 – Stuart Bingham
- 128 – Robbie Williams
- 127 – David Grace
- 127 – Jimmy Robertson
- 126 – Marco Fu
- 122, 118 – Thepchaiya Un-Nooh
- 122, 105 – Matthew Stevens
- 119 – Lyu Haotian
- 117 – Zhang Yong
- 116 – Daniel Wells
- 111 – Mark Williams
- 107 – Ross Muir
- 107 – Yuan Sijun
- 106 – Mark Davis
- 106 – Michael White
- 105 – Shaun Murphy
- 104 – Martin Gould
- 102 – Matthew Selt
- 101, 100 – Zhang Anda
- 101 – Fergal O'Brien
- 100 – Mark Allen
- 100 – Dominic Dale
- 100 – Ashley Hugill

=== Televised stage centuries ===
Total: 50

- 144, 127, 123, 108 – Ronnie O'Sullivan
- 143 – Ali Carter
- 140 – Michael White
- 137, 111 – Joe Perry
- 137, 101 – Graeme Dott
- 135, 119, 107 – Kurt Maflin
- 135 – Gerard Greene
- 133, 115, 104, 102, 102, 100 – Mark Allen
- 133, 108 – Mark Williams
- 132, 120, 114 – Mark Selby
- 131, 125, 104 – John Higgins
- 125, 108, 105 – Liang Wenbo
- 124, 107 – Marco Fu
- 124, 102, 100 – Martin Gould
- 121 – Barry Hawkins
- 119, 114, 108, 105, 102 – Judd Trump
- 118, 107 – Stephen Maguire
- 117, 113, 102 – Jack Lisowski
- 110 – Zhou Yuelong
- 108 – Sanderson Lam
- 106 – Jimmy Robertson
