= Shanghai Indoor Stadium =

Sports venue in Shanghai, China

Shanghai Indoor Stadium 上海体育馆
- Shanghai Grand Stage
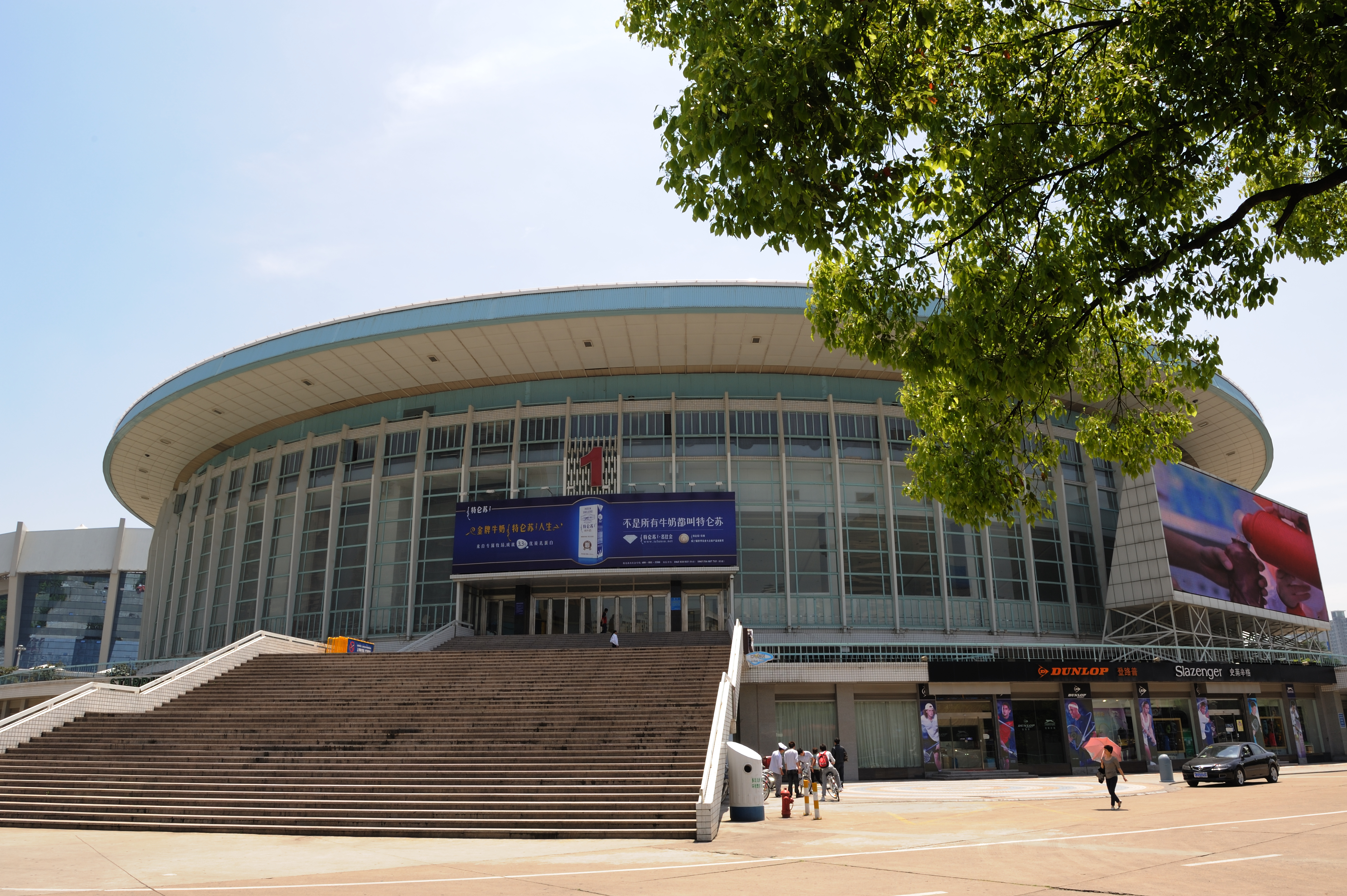
- Interactive map of Shanghai Indoor Stadium 上海体育馆
- Location: Xuhui District, Shanghai
- Coordinates: 31°11′0.10″N 121°26′0.78″E
- Owner: Shanghai East Asia Sports & Culture Center
- Capacity: 13,000
- Surface: Flooring

Construction
- Built: 1975
- Opened: 1976
- Renovated: 1999, 2004

Tenant
- Shanghai Sharks

The Shanghai Indoor Stadium (上海体育馆) is a multi-purpose gymnasium in Shanghai used mostly for basketball games.

Hailed as a great feat of engineering at the time of its construction, the building is now considered dated and out-classed by newly constructed sporting facilities nearby. It is now used for entertainment events and sporting competitions, like table tennis.

== Name ==
The Shanghai Indoor Stadium is located close to Shanghai Stadium, the home of Shanghai Shenhua. The two facilities have very similar names in Chinese – the Shanghai Indoor Stadium is literally called a "Sports Arena" (体育馆) while the Shanghai Stadium is called a "Sports Field" (体育场) – while in English their names differ only by the addition of "Indoor". This poor translation has been a source of confusion, especially after the opening of Shanghai Metro Line 4 with adjacent stations of these names.

When serving as a concert venue, it is often referred to as Shanghai Grand Stage (Chinese: 上海大舞台) or Shanghai Gymnasium. It is also the venue for the annual Shanghai Masters snooker championship, a major event on the international snooker calendar.

== Notable events ==
=== Concerts by international performers ===
2001-2009

- 20 February 2001: La Luna World Tour - Sarah Brightman
- 19&21 September 2004: Elton John 2004 Tour - Elton John
- 12 December 2005: Michael Bolton
- 18 January 2006: Never Gone Tour - Backstreet Boys
- 8 April 2006: A Bigger Bang Tour - The Rolling Stones
- 15 May 2006: Robin Gibb
- 26 June 2006: Face To Face Tour - Westlife
- 20 July 2006: Monkey Business Tour - The Black Eyed Peas
- 20 January 2007: Eric Clapton
- 12 February 2007: The Dark Side of the Moon Live - Roger Waters
- 26 June 2007: Back to Basics Tour - Christina Aguilera
- 5 November 2007: The Beyoncé Experience - Beyoncé
- 3 November 2008: Glow in the Dark Tour - Kanye West
- 27 March 2009: The Symphony World Tour - Sarah Brightman
- 3 May 2009: Sleepless Night - Vitas

2010-2016

- 8 April 2011: Never Ending Tour 2011 - Bob Dylan
- 2 May 2011: The Black Star Tour - Avril Lavigne
- 26 July 2011: The Cranberries
- 9 August 2011：Suede
- 25 February 2012: Greatest Hits - Westlife
- 4 April 2012:Screaming Bloody Murder Tour - Sum 41
- 28 May 2013: In a World Like This Tour - Backstreet Boys
- 23 June 2013: Dreamchaser World Tour - Sarah Brightman
- 20 August 2013: Electric Tour - Pet Shop Boys
- 2 November 2013: Native Tour - OneRepublic
- 21 September 2014: You and Me Tour - Shane Filan of Westlife
- 1 April 2015: Jason Mraz
- 19 August 2015: Smoke + Mirrors Tour - Imagine Dragons
- 8 October 2015: Megadeth
- 27 February 2016: Sounds Live Feels Live World Tour - 5 Seconds Of Summer
- 4 October 2016: Kesha

=== Domestic, Asian & other events ===
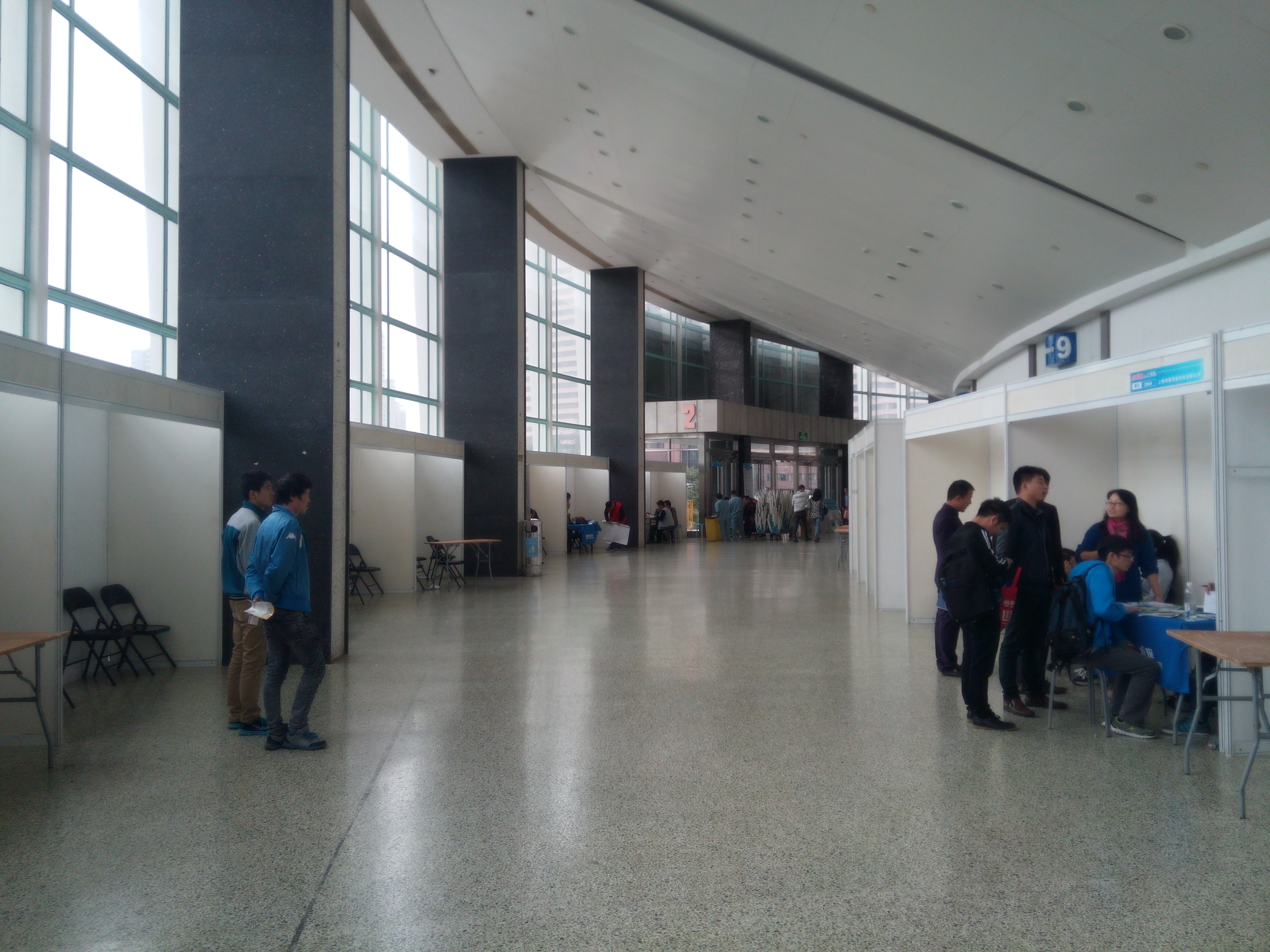
Inside the stadium

- 30 and 31 May 1997: ID Tour – Aska Concert Tour 1997
- 26 and 27 November 1999: Asian Tour No Doubt – Chage & Aska Asian Tour 1999
- 22 April 2007: Tour of Secret – Ayumi Hamasaki Asia Tour 2007
- 17 November 2007: Alive in live – Chage & Aska Asian Tour 2007
- 22 November 2008: 1st Asia Tour: Super Show – Super Junior, in front of 11,000 people
- 11 and 12 July 2009: BEST FICTION TOUR 2008–2009 – Namie Amuro
- 6 and 7 March 2010: 2nd Asia Tour: Super Show 2 – Super Junior, in front of 22,000 people.
- 17 April 2010: 1st Asia Tour: Into The New World – Girls' Generation, in front of 7,000 people
- 28 August 2010: I AM World Tour-JJ Lin
- 7 November 2010: JYJ The Beginning Showcase World Tour (2010) - JYJ
- 30 October 2011: X Japan
- 14 March 2012: Charm School World Tour – Roxette
- 30 April 2012: 2012 Shinhwa Grand Tour in Shanghai: The Return - Shinhwa
- 11 April 2014: AON: All Or Nothing World Tour 2014 - 2NE1
- 17 January 2015: Worldwide Inner Circle Conference: WWIC 2015 - WINNER
- 30 May 2015: Pink Paradise - Apink
- 7 October 2015: Zhang Yixing 2nd Birthday Concert - Lay
- 25 October 2015: SHINee Concert: "SHINee World IV 2015" - SHINee
- February 2016: Dota 2 Asia Championships
- 2 April 2017: X NINE Shanghai Live Concert

=== Sporting events ===
- 23 August 2025: UFC Fight Night: Walker vs. Zhang

== Transportation ==
Shanghai Indoor Stadium can be reached by taking Shanghai Metro Line 1 or Line 4 to the Shanghai Indoor Stadium station. The Caoxi Road Public Transport Hub as well as Caoxi Road Station, part of Metro Line 3, is located just to the south of it.

== See also ==
- List of indoor arenas in China
