= 2023 Masters (snooker) =

2023 Cazoo Masters

Tournament information
- Dates: 8–15 January 2023
- Venue: Alexandra Palace
- City: London
- Country: England
- Organisation: World Snooker Tour
- Format: Non-ranking event
- Total prize fund: £725,000
- Winner's share: £250,000
- Highest break: Judd Trump (ENG) (143); Hossein Vafaei (IRN) (143); Mark Williams (WAL) (143)

Final
- Champion: Judd Trump (ENG)
- Runner-up: Mark Williams (WAL)
- Score: 10–8

The 2023 Masters (officially the 2023 Cazoo Masters) was a professional non-ranking snooker tournament that took place from 8 to 15 January 2023 at Alexandra Palace in London, England. It was the 49th staging of the Masters, which was first held in 1975, and the second of three Triple Crown events in the 2022–23 snooker season, following the 2022 UK Championship and preceding the 2023 World Snooker Championship. Organised by the World Snooker Tour and sponsored by car retailer Cazoo, the tournament was broadcast by the BBC domestically, by Eurosport in Europe, and by Matchroom Sport and other broadcasters elsewhere in the world. The winner received £250,000 from a total prize pool of £725,000.

The top 16 players in the snooker world rankings as they stood after the UK Championship were invited to the event. However, the sport's governing body subsequently suspended invitees Yan Bingtao and Zhao Xintong from professional competition amid a match-fixing investigation. Yan was replaced in the draw by David Gilbert. Zhao was replaced by Hossein Vafaei, who was the only Masters debutant and the first Iranian player to compete in the tournament.

Neil Robertson was the defending champion, having defeated Barry Hawkins 10–4 in the 2022 final. However, Robertson lost 4–6 to Shaun Murphy in the first round. Mark Williams reached the final for the first time in 20 years, becoming the oldest finalist since Ray Reardon in 1983. Judd Trump defeated Williams 10–8 in the final to capture his second Masters title, becoming the 11th player to win the title more than once. There were 30 century breaks at the tournament. The highest break prize was shared by Trump, Vafaei, and Williams, who all made 143 breaks in their quarter-final matches.

== Overview ==
The Masters is a non-ranking snooker tournament that was first held in 1975 for ten invited players at the West Centre Hotel in London. John Spencer won the inaugural event, defeating Ray Reardon on a re-spotted black in the deciding frame of the final. The Masters is the second-longest-running professional snooker tournament, after the World Snooker Championship. The most successful player in its history is Ronnie O'Sullivan, who has won the title seven times, most recently in 2017.

Organised by the World Snooker Tour and sponsored by car retailer Cazoo, the 2023 event was the 49th staging of the tournament. The second Triple Crown event of the 2022–23 snooker season, following the 2022 UK Championship and preceding the 2023 World Snooker Championship, it took place from 8 to 15 January 2023 at Alexandra Palace in London. Matches were played as the best of 11 frames until the final, which was the best of 19 frames and played over two sessions.

The tournament was broadcast live in the United Kingdom by BBC Sport and in Europe by Eurosport. It was broadcast in China by China Central Television and Superstars Online and streamed by Huya, Youku, Migu, Douyin, and Kuaishou. It was broadcast by Now TV in Hong Kong, by DAZN in Brazil and the United States, by Fastsports HD in Pakistan, by Astro SuperSport in Malaysia, by Sport Cast in Taiwan and Indonesia, by TrueVisions in Thailand, and by Premier Sports Network and TapGO in the Philippines. In all other territories, the event was streamed by Matchroom Sport.

=== Participants ===
The 16 highest-ranked players after the 2022 UK Championship were invited to participate in the tournament. The defending champion was Australia's Neil Robertson, who won the tournament for a second time at the 2022 Masters by defeating England's Barry Hawkins 10–4 in the final. Robertson was seeded first for the event as defending champion, while O'Sullivan was seeded second as the reigning world champion. The next six players in the world rankings were seeded and allocated fixed positions in the draw, with the remaining eight participants drawn randomly against them. The first-round draw was made during the UK Championship final, which was contested by Mark Allen and Ding Junhui on 20 November 2022.

Ding would have re-entered the top 16 and been invited to the event had he won the UK Championship, but Allen defeated him, so the last Masters spot went to 2021 champion Yan Bingtao, who was ranked 16th in the world at the cutoff. Yan was drawn against seventh seed Mark Williams. However, on 12 December 2022, the sport's governing body, the World Professional Billiards and Snooker Association, suspended Yan amid a match-fixing investigation, making him ineligible to compete in or attend any World Snooker Tour event. David Gilbert, ranked 17th in the world after the UK Championship, replaced Yan in the draw. On 3 January 2023, the WPBSA suspended the world number nine Zhao Xintong, who had been drawn against third seed Mark Selby in the first round, as part of the same investigation. Hossein Vafaei, ranked 18th after the UK Championship, replaced Zhao in the draw. Vafaei was the only Masters debutant at the 2023 event and the first Iranian player to compete in the tournament.

=== Prize money ===
The winner of the event received £250,000 from a total prize pool of £725,000. The breakdown of prize money for the event is shown below:

- Winner: £250,000
- Runner-up: £100,000
- Semi-finals: £60,000
- Quarter-finals: £30,000
- Last 16: £15,000
- Highest break: £15,000
- Total: £725,000

== Summary ==
=== First round ===
The first round was played from 8 to 11 January as the best of 11 frames. On the opening afternoon, 2015 winner Shaun Murphy faced the defending champion Robertson, who won the first frame. Murphy then won five consecutive frames, making a century break in frame six after a miscue from Robertson, to move one frame from victory. However, Robertson won the next three frames, including a maximum break attempt in the ninth, which ended when he missed the 14th red ball. Robertson had chances in the tenth to force a deciding frame but missed a key shot on the blue ball after potting the penultimate red, which allowed Murphy to clinch the match 6–4. Afterwards, Robertson said that a bad flu had affected his preparation for the event as well as his performance in the match. In the evening, debutant Vafaei faced three-time winner Selby. The scores were tied at 2–2 at the mid-session interval, but Vafaei won all four frames played after the interval for a 6–2 victory, making two centuries and three half-centuries in the match. It was the third consecutive time Vafaei had beaten Selby, after eliminating him in the previous two UK Championships; it was also the ninth consecutive year Selby had lost at either the first-round or quarter-final stage, having last reached the semi-finals in 2014. Vafaei paid tribute to Selby, calling him a "tough opponent" and a "legend", and commented: "Am I asleep or awake? Honestly I can't believe it".

Luca Brecel faced world number one O'Sullivan, who took the opening frame with a 97 break and won both the second and third on the colours after errors from his opponent. Although Brecel made a century break to win frame four, O’Sullivan responded with back-to-back centuries of 134 and 104 before wrapping up a 6–1 victory in frame seven. O'Sullivan commented: "It is not easy to play under pressure and I sensed that Luca felt a little uncomfortable and I tried to make the most of that and punish every mistake he made". In the evening, Jack Lisowski, who had won just four frames across his three previous Masters appearances, faced two-time winner John Higgins, who was playing in the tournament for a record-extending 29th time. Higgins made a 142 break in the third frame but Lisowski led 3–1 at the interval. Higgins won frame five, but Lisowski made a century in the sixth and came from 55 points behind to win the seventh. Higgins attempted a maximum break in frame eight but missed the ninth black; he won the frame after Lisowski missed the last red. Lisowski clinched his first Masters victory in frame nine, making a 93 break to win 6–3. He commented afterwards that the event had "always overawed me but the crowd were incredible and kept lifting me. I've broken my duck". Higgins expressed frustration at his errors in the match and said he was considering working with a sports psychologist.

The 2018 winner Allen faced two-time runner-up Hawkins, who trailed by 55 points in the opening frame but recovered to win it on the colours. Hawkins took the next two with breaks of 76 and 114 and won frame four on the colours after Allen missed the brown to a baulk pocket. Hawkins took the fifth with breaks of 45 and 41. In the sixth, Allen missed a rest shot while on a 45 break and then made a safety mistake with two reds remaining that let Hawkins close out a 6–0 whitewash. It was Allen's fifth consecutive first-round defeat since winning the tournament and also made him the fourth consecutive UK champion to lose in the first round of the Masters. Allen praised Hawkins's safety play, saying: "It was probably one of the best safety performances I have ever played against as a professional". In the evening, two-time winner Williams faced Gilbert, who had reached the semi-finals on both his previous appearances in the tournament. Williams won the first two frames with back-to-back centuries of 126 and 127 and took the third with a 95 break. After Gilbert missed a rest shot on the penultimate red in the fourth, Williams cleared to lead 4–0 at the interval. Gilbert won the fifth frame with a 59 break, and produced an 80 clearance in the sixth from 42 points behind, reducing his deficit to two frames. Even though Gilbert also made half-centuries in the next two frames, Williams won the seventh after a safety exchange on the last red and won the eighth on the colours to wrap up a 6–2 victory. Williams, referee Marcel Eckardt, and a cameraman all became involved in trying to swat a wasp during the final frame before the referee asked Williams to continue play.

The 2019 winner Judd Trump faced the season's British Open winner Ryan Day. The scores were tied at 3–3 after Trump made a 105 century, the highest break of the match, in the sixth frame. Day won the next two frames to move one from victory, and the ninth frame went to a re-spotted black. Day missed a pot to a baulk pocket that would have won the match, and Trump potted the black to take the frame. Day led in the tenth but missed the black after potting the last red, and Trump tied the scores at 5–5. In the deciding frame, Day played a cannon into the pack while potting the black but fouled when a red dropped into the middle pocket. Trump made a 58 break to leave Day requiring snookers. However, with one red remaining, Trump failed to escape from a snooker and conceded a free ball. Day could have won the match by clearing from the free ball but missed his nominated brown to the middle pocket, and Trump potted the last red to win 6–5. "I was a bit nervous at the start and it took going 5–3 behind to feel like the weight was lifted off me to go for my shots", said Trump. In the final first-round match, 2018 runner-up Kyren Wilson faced 2020 winner Stuart Bingham, who won the first two frames with back-to-back centuries of 102 and 109. Bingham took the third after Wilson missed a pot on the blue and won the fourth with an 85 break. He made a 127, his third century of the match, to take a 5–0 lead. Wilson won the next two frames with breaks of 90 and 81 and won the eighth on the colours to reduce his deficit to two frames. However, Bingham sealed a 6–3 victory with a pot on the yellow in frame nine after a safety error from Wilson. “At 5–0 I was cruising then Kyren showed his true grit and made a fight of it. In the end I was lucky to get through", Bingham commented. Wilson said: "I was proud of the way I came back. I just played a couple of bad safeties in the last frame”.

=== Quarter-finals ===
The quarter-finals were played on 12 and 13 January as the best of 11 frames. Facing Williams, O'Sullivan began with a 115 century and took a 3–0 lead but he ran out of position in the fourth and Williams came from behind to win the frame with a 55 break. O'Sullivan maintained a two-frame lead at 4–2, but Williams made a 143 total clearance in frame seven and a 90 break in frame eight to level the scores at 4–4. Leading by 49 points in the ninth, O'Sullivan missed a red to a middle pocket, and Williams made a 59 clearance to take the lead at 5–4. O'Sullivan forced a deciding frame with a 77 break in the tenth, but Williams closed out a 6–5 victory with a 102 century. It was the first time Williams had beaten O'Sullivan in a Triple Crown event since the semi-finals of the 2000 UK Championship. Calling the match one of his best performances, Williams said: "In the first three frames I didn't have a shot, he tied me up in knots but I felt the crowd wanted me to win towards the end, that is unbelievable." O'Sullivan said: "I just didn't score, didn't make any breaks and my cue ball wasn't great".

Vafaei faced Lisowski, with both players competing in their first Masters quarter-final. Lisowski, who suffered from a migraine in the hours before the match, made breaks of 96 and 76 to win the first two frames, but Vafaei responded with a 68 and a total clearance of 143 to level the scores at the mid-session interval. Vafaei won the fifth frame, but Lisowski drew level at 3–3 with a break of 67. Vafaei led in the seventh but missed a shot on the yellow with the rest, and Lisowski cleared to win the frame. Vafaei won the eighth on the colours to level the scores again at 4–4. However, Lisowski won the ninth after a safety exchange on the blue and took the tenth with a break of 74 to win the match 6–4 and advance to his second Triple Crown semi-final, after reaching the same stage at the 2022 UK Championship. Lisowski said that playing in the semi-finals "is what I had dreamed of and had aspirations of doing when I was growing up". Vafaei was philosophical in defeat, saying: "You need to lose until you learn how to win".

Facing Hawkins, Trump won a safety battle on the penultimate red to take the opening frame. Hawkins responded with a 110 century to win the second and also took the third, before Trump levelled the scores at the mid-session interval with a 69 break. In the fifth, Hawkins led by 39 points when he missed a black off the spot, allowing Trump to win the frame with a 61 break. In the sixth, Hawkins missed a red that would have left his opponent requiring snookers; Trump attempted a counter-clearance, but missed the black after potting the last red, and Hawkins tied the scores at 3–3. Hawkins went ahead with a 66 break in frame seven, but Trump tied the scores again with a 143 total clearance in the eighth, his highest ever break at the Masters. Hawkins won the ninth, aided by a fluke on a red, but Trump forced a deciding frame with a 107 break and then made an 81 break to win the match 6–5. Afterwards, Hawkins expressed frustration with his positional play and said that Trump, even though not at his best, deserved to win. Trump stated that he had suffered from nerves in his matches but said: "I seemed to relax, get control and felt my best towards the end". Speaking as a pundit for the BBC, six-time winner Stephen Hendry praised Trump's performance, saying: "A sign of a true great and a world-class player is to produce the best snooker when you have your back against the wall. The frames he won at the end of the match were magnificent".

In the last quarter-final, Bingham faced Murphy. Bingham won the first frame on the colours after a fluke on the green and then made breaks of 78, 128, and 107 to lead 4–0 at the mid-session interval. Bingham won the fifth after Murphy missed a red and received 24 points in fouls in the sixth frame as Murphy attempted to escape from a snooker. Bingham wrapped up a 6–0 whitewash with a break of 65. "I got a bit lucky in the first frame which settled me down, and after that I went from strength to strength", Bingham commented afterwards. "My preparation for this match was very good but I was beaten by someone who played like a superhero", said Murphy.

=== Semi-finals ===
The semi-finals were played on 14 January as the best of 11 frames. In the first semi-final, Lisowski faced Williams, who made two half-centuries as he moved into a 3–0 lead. Lisowski led in the fourth frame but played a poor safety shot on the penultimate red, and Williams took the frame to lead 4–0 at the interval. Williams made another half-century to go 5–0 ahead. Lisowski had a chance to win the sixth on the colours but played a poor positional shot to get on the brown. After a safety exchange, Williams potted the brown, blue, and pink to wrap up a 6–0 whitewash. "There were no century breaks but I maybe had three or four breaks from positions where the balls weren't easy. Those breaks are as good as any century", said Williams. "It wasn't meant to be. I couldn't get anything going and he just shut me out", commented Lisowski.

In the other semi-final, Bingham met Trump, who made breaks of 58 and 87 to win the opening two frames. Trump led by 38 points in the third when he missed a red; Bingham produced a frame-winning 93 clearance, his only break over 50 in the match. The fourth frame was decided when Bingham went in-off after a lengthy safety exchange on the green, enabling Trump to take a 3–1 lead at the mid-session interval. Trump won the 45-minute fifth frame after safety battles on the yellow and blue and won the sixth frame by potting the penultimate red and a green. He made a 58 break in the seventh before missing a red; Bingham obtained two snookers before Trump closed out a 6–1 victory on the colours. The match was noted for numerous errors by both players. Trump indicated that he needed to play better in the final, saying “I need to step up my game, the way I played tonight won’t work against Mark, he won’t play that badly".

=== Final ===
The final took place on 15 January as a best-of-19-frame match, played over two sessions, between fourth seed Trump and seventh seed Williams. Trump was contesting his second Masters final while Williams was competing in his fourth. Williams had last reached the final at the 2003 event, when he won his second title with a 10–4 victory over Hendry. Aged 47 years and 300 days, he became the oldest finalist since Ray Reardon in 1983.

Williams won the first frame with a total clearance of 138. Trump won the next four frames, making a 106 century in the fourth, to lead 4–1. Williams took the next two frames, making a 100 century in the sixth, reducing Trump's lead to one. In frame eight, Williams missed a double, allowing Trump to make an 89 break and lead 5–3 after the first session. In the evening session, the first two frames were shared before Williams won three consecutive frames to take the lead at 7–6. The 57-minute 14th frame went to Trump after Williams conceded three fouls while attempting to escape from a snooker on the green, leaving himself requiring snookers. Williams made a 107 break in the 15th to regain the lead at 8–7, but Trump levelled again at 8–8 after snookering Williams on the yellow. Trump cleared from the last red to win the 17th frame after Williams made a safety error. Williams had the first scoring opportunity in the 18th, but he missed a long red to a baulk corner pocket. Trump made a 126 break, the fifth century of the final, to win the match 10–8 and capture his second Masters title, becoming the 11th player to win the tournament more than once. Trump said: "This is by far my best ever win. The way I played this week is not my best, but this is my best ever performance to grind out and win this". Williams said: "It was a great game and a great occasion, the crowd was unbelievable. I played well and tried as hard as I could. I had a couple of chances to go 8–6 up, but not easy ones. I loved every minute of it, I just didn’t get over the line".

== Tournament draw ==
Numbers given on the left show the players' seedings in the tournament draw. Players in bold denote match winners.

**First round** Best of 11 frames
1	Neil Robertson (AUS)	4
**12**	**Shaun Murphy (ENG)**	**6**
8	Kyren Wilson (ENG)	3
**14**	**Stuart Bingham (ENG)**	**6**
5	Mark Allen (NIR)	0
**13**	**Barry Hawkins (ENG)**	**6**
**4**	**Judd Trump (ENG)**	**6**
15	Ryan Day (WAL)	5
3	Mark Selby (ENG)	2
**Hossein Vafaei (IRN)**	**6**
6	John Higgins (SCO)	3
**10**	**Jack Lisowski (ENG)**	**6**
**7**	**Mark Williams (WAL)**	**6**
David Gilbert (ENG)	2
**2**	**Ronnie O'Sullivan (ENG)**	**6**
11	Luca Brecel (BEL)	1

**Quarter-finals**; Best of 11 frames
12	(England) Shaun Murphy	0
**14**	**(England) Stuart Bingham**	**6**
13	(England) Barry Hawkins	5
**4**	**(England) Judd Trump**	**6**
(Iran) Hossein Vafaei	4
**10**	**(England) Jack Lisowski**	**6**
**7**	**(Wales) Mark Williams**	**6**
2	(England) Ronnie O'Sullivan	5

**Semi-finals**; Best of 11 frames
14	(England) Stuart Bingham	1
**4**	**(England) Judd Trump**	**6**
10	(England) Jack Lisowski	0
**7**	**(Wales) Mark Williams**	**6**

**Final**; Best of 19 frames
**4**	**(England) Judd Trump**	**10**
7	(Wales) Mark Williams	8

=== Final ===
Final
Final: Best-of-19 frames. Referee: Marcel Eckardt; Alexandra Palace, London, England, 15 January 2023.
**Judd Trump** (4); England	**10**–8	Mark Williams (7); Wales
Afternoon: 0–**138** (138), **106**–3 (61), **74**–11, **115**–6 (106), **73**–35 (73), 0–**140** (100), 10–**97** (60), **93**–0 (89); Evening: 8–**117** (50), **74**–0 (66), 10–**80** (80), 8–**68** (52), 17–**67**, **80**–46, 0–**136** (107), **81**–30, **98**–40 (59), **126**–8 (126)
126	Highest break	**138**
2	Century breaks	**3**
7	50+ breaks	7

== Century breaks ==
There were 30 century breaks made during the tournament. For every century at the event, the World Snooker Tour donated £500 to the Jessie May Children's Hospice, which received a total donation of £15,000.

- 143, 138, 127, 126, 107, 102, 100 – Mark Williams
- 143, 126, 107, 106, 105 – Judd Trump
- 143, 107, 104 – Hossein Vafaei
- 142 – John Higgins
- 134, 115, 104 – Ronnie O'Sullivan
- 128, 127, 109, 107, 102 – Stuart Bingham
- 114, 110 – Barry Hawkins
- 104 – Neil Robertson
- 100 – Luca Brecel
- 100 – Jack Lisowski
- 100 – Shaun Murphy
