= 2022 Champion of Champions =

Snooker tournament

2022 Cazoo Champion of Champions
Tournament information
- Dates: 31 October – 6 November 2022
- Venue: University of Bolton Stadium
- City: Bolton
- Country: England
- Organisation: Matchroom Sport
- Format: Non-ranking event
- Total prize fund: £440,000
- Winner's share: £150,000
- Highest break: Judd Trump (ENG) (147)

Final
- Champion: Ronnie O'Sullivan (ENG)
- Runner-up: Judd Trump (ENG)
- Score: 10–6

The 2022 Champion of Champions (officially the 2022 Cazoo Champion of Champions) was a professional snooker tournament that took place between 31 October and 6 November 2022 at the University of Bolton Stadium in Bolton, England. The 12th edition of the Champion of Champions since the tournament was first staged in 1978, it featured 16 participants, primarily winners of significant tournaments since the previous year's event. As an invitational tournament, it carried no world ranking points. The winner received £150,000 from a total prize fund of £440,000.

Judd Trump was the defending champion, having defeated John Higgins 10–4 in the 2021 final. Ronnie O'Sullivan defeated Trump 10–6 in the final to win his fourth Champion of Champions title. Trump made a maximum break in the eighth frame of the final, the seventh of his professional career and the second in the tournament's history.

== Format ==
=== Prize fund ===
- Winner: £150,000
- Runner-up: £60,000
- Semi-final: £30,000
- Group runner-up: £17,500
- First round loser: £12,500
- Total: £440,000

=== Qualification ===
Players qualified for the event by winning events throughout the previous year. Events shown below in grey are for players who had already qualified for the event. Remaining participants were the highest ranked players in the world rankings.

Qualification table
Tournament	Date of tournament final	Winner
2021 Champion of Champions	21 November 2021	Judd Trump (ENG)
2021 UK Championship	5 December 2021	Zhao Xintong (CHN)
2022 Masters	16 January 2022	Neil Robertson (AUS)
2022 World Championship	2 May 2022	Ronnie O'Sullivan (ENG)
2021 World Grand Prix	19 December 2021	Ronnie O'Sullivan (ENG)
2022 German Masters	30 January 2022	Zhao Xintong (CHN)
2022 Players Championship	13 February 2022	Neil Robertson (AUS)
2022 European Masters (2021−22 season)	27 February 2022	Fan Zhengyi (CHN)
2022 Championship League Invitational	4 February 2022	John Higgins (SCO)
2022 Tour Championship	28 March 2022	Neil Robertson (AUS)
2022 Championship League (ranking)	29 July 2022	Luca Brecel (BEL)
2022 Turkish Masters	13 March 2022	Judd Trump (ENG)
2022 European Masters (2022–23 season)	21 August 2022	Kyren Wilson (ENG)
2021 Scottish Open	12 December 2021	Luca Brecel (BEL)
2022 Welsh Open	6 March 2022	Joe Perry (ENG)
2022 Northern Ireland Open	23 October 2022	Mark Allen (NIR)
2022 British Open	2 October 2022	Ryan Day (WAL)
2022 Gibraltar Open	26 March 2022	Robert Milkins (ENG)
2022 World Championship (runner-up)	2 May 2022	Judd Trump (ENG)
2022 Shoot Out	23 January 2022	Hossein Vafaei (IRN)
2022 Hong Kong Masters	9 October 2022	Ronnie O'Sullivan (ENG)
2022 Women's World Championship	14 February 2022	Mink Nutcharut (THA)
2022 World Seniors Championship	8 May 2022	Lee Walker (WAL)
Qualified through the world rankings	9 October 2022	Mark Selby (ENG)

Player also qualified by winning another tournament

== Tournament draw ==
Group semi-finals (last 16); Best of 7 frames
1	Judd Trump (ENG)	4
Luca Brecel (BEL)	2
Group 1
8	Mark Allen (NIR)	4
Joe Perry (ENG)	2
4	Mark Selby (ENG)	4
Lee Walker (WAL)	0
Group 4
5	John Higgins (SCO)	4
Hossein Vafaei (IRN)	2
3	Neil Robertson (AUS)	3
Fan Zhengyi (CHN)	4
Group 3
6	Kyren Wilson (ENG)	3
Ryan Day (WAL)	4
7	Zhao Xintong (CHN)	4
Mink Nutcharut (THA)	2
Group 2
2	Ronnie O'Sullivan (ENG)	4
Robert Milkins (ENG)	2

Group finals (quarter-finals); Best of 11 frames
1	(England) Judd Trump	6
8	(Northern Ireland) Mark Allen	1
4	(England) Mark Selby	6
5	(Scotland) John Higgins	4
(China) Fan Zhengyi	6
(Wales) Ryan Day	5
7	(China) Zhao Xintong	1
2	(England) Ronnie O'Sullivan	6

Semi-finals; Best of 11 frames
1	(England) Judd Trump	6
4	(England) Mark Selby	3
(China) Fan Zhengyi	2
2	(England) Ronnie O'Sullivan	6

Final; Best of 19 frames
1	(England) Judd Trump	6
2	(England) Ronnie O'Sullivan	10

=== Final ===
Final: Best of 19 frames. Referee: Marcel Eckardt; Bolton Whites Hotel, Bolton, England, 6 November 2022
Judd Trump (1); England	6–10	Ronnie O'Sullivan (2); England
Afternoon: 0–130 (96), 0–117 (103), 67–52 (O'Sullivan 52, Trump 51), 55–73, 14–78, 32–95 (52), 31–96 (88), 147–0 (147), 96–32 (96); Evening: 0–106 (106), 63–0, 82–0 (82), 100–0 (100), 6–124 (124), 1–85 (85), 18–82 (81)
147	Highest break	124
2	Century breaks	3
5	50+ breaks	9

== Century breaks ==
A total of 24 century breaks were made during the tournament.

- 147, 114, 104, 100 – Judd Trump
- 141, 118 – John Higgins
- 140, 105 – Mark Selby
- 135, 131, 124, 117, 108, 106, 103 – Ronnie O'Sullivan
- 135, 130, 123 – Fan Zhengyi
- 132 – Zhao Xintong
- 122 – Neil Robertson
- 118, 110, 103 – Mark Allen
- 102 – Robert Milkins
