= 2022 UK Championship =

Snooker tournament

2022 Cazoo UK Championship
Tournament information
- Dates: 12–20 November 2022
- Venue: York Barbican
- City: York
- Country: England
- Organisation: World Snooker Tour
- Format: Ranking event
- Total prize fund: £1,205,000
- Winner's share: £250,000
- Highest break: Cao Yupeng (CHN) (144)

Final
- Champion: Mark Allen (NIR)
- Runner-up: Ding Junhui (CHN)
- Score: 10–7

The 2022 UK Championship (officially the 2022 Cazoo UK Championship) was a professional snooker tournament that took place from 12 to 20 November 2022 at the York Barbican in York, England. The fifth ranking event and first Triple Crown event of the 2022–23 snooker season, the tournament was the 46th edition of the UK Championship, which was first held in 1977. Organised by the World Snooker Tour and sponsored by car retail company Cazoo, the event was broadcast domestically by the BBC and Eurosport. The winner received £250,000 from a total prize fund of £1,205,000.

The World Snooker Tour changed the format for the 2022 event, replacing the flat-128 draw that had been used from 2013 to 2021 with a format that closely resembled that of the World Snooker Championship. The top 16 players in the world rankings—as they stood after the 2022 Northern Ireland Open—were seeded through to the last-32 stage, where they were joined by 16 qualifiers from a 128-player qualifying tournament that took place from 5 to 10 November at Ponds Forge in Sheffield. Aged 60, Jimmy White became the oldest player to qualify for the tournament's final stages since 63-year-old Eddie Charlton in 1993.

Zhao Xintong was the defending champion, having defeated Luca Brecel 10–5 in the final of the 2021 event, but he lost 2–6 to Sam Craigie in the first round. Mark Allen, runner-up in 2011 and 2018, reached his third UK Championship final. He faced three-time winner Ding Junhui, who reached his first ranking final in three years. Having trailed in every match he played in the tournament, Allen fell 1–6 behind in the final, but he won nine of the last ten frames to clinch a 10–7 victory. He became the second Northern Irish player to win the UK Championship, after Alex Higgins in 1983; his comeback from 1–6 behind saw him overcome the largest deficit in a UK Championship final since Higgins came from 0–7 behind to defeat Steve Davis 16–15 in that year. It was Allen's eighth ranking title and second Triple Crown title, following his win at the 2018 Masters. The event produced 126 century breaks, 74 in qualifying and 52 at the main stage. Cao Yupeng made the tournament's highest break, a 144 in his second-round qualifying match against Callum Beresford.

== Format ==
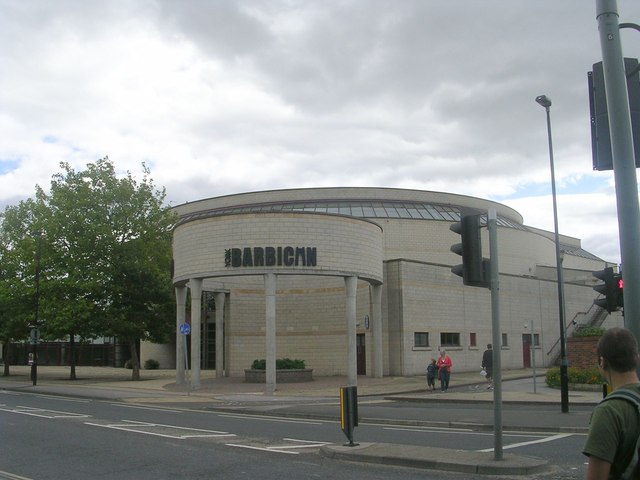
The event was staged at the York Barbican in York, England.

The 2022 UK Championship was a professional snooker tournament that took place from 12 to 20 November at the York Barbican in York, England. The fifth ranking event and first Triple Crown tournament of the 2022–23 snooker season, the tournament was the 46th edition of the UK Championship, which was first held in 1977 as the United Kingdom Professional Snooker Championship. For the tournament's first seven years, only UK residents or passport holders were eligible to compete. At the 1984 event, the UK Championship became a ranking tournament open to players of any nationality, which has remained the case since.

For the 2022 event, a format similar to the World Championship replaced the flat-128 draw that had been used for the preceding nine years from 2013 to 2021. The top 16 players in the snooker world rankings—as they stood after the 2022 Northern Ireland Open—were seeded through to the round of 32. An additional 128 players—comprising professionals ranked outside the top 16, leading amateur players from the WPBSA's Q Tour and other amateur events, and top-performing junior players from the UK—competed in a four-round qualifying tournament from 5 to 10 November at Ponds Forge in Sheffield, with higher ranked players given byes to the later rounds. The 16 successful qualifiers advanced to the round of 32 in York, where they were drawn at random against the top 16 seeds. The qualifying rounds were broadcast on Discovery+ as well as on the World Snooker Tour's Facebook and YouTube channels.

All matches before the final were played as the best of 11 frames. The final was played as the best of 19 frames. Due to the revised format, the venue in York featured two tables at the outset, rather than the eight tables used in preceding years. The main stages of the event were broadcast in the UK by the BBC and Eurosport, and in Europe by Discovery+ and Eurosport. Other international broadcasters included Kuaishou, Huya Live, Youku, and CCTV in China; NowTV in Hong Kong; and DAZN in Canada, the United States, and Brazil. In territories where there was no other coverage, the event was broadcast by Matchroom Sport. The defending champion was China's Zhao Xintong, who won his maiden ranking title at the previous year's event, defeating Belgium's Luca Brecel 10–5 in the final.

=== Prize fund ===
The event featured a total prize fund of £1,205,000, up from £1,009,000 the previous year, with the winner receiving £250,000, up from £200,000 the previous year. The tournament was sponsored by British car retailer Cazoo. The breakdown of prize money for the event is shown below:

- Winner: £250,000
- Runner-up: £100,000
- Semi-final: £50,000
- Quarter-final: £25,000
- Last 16: £15,000
- Last 32: £10,000
- Last 48: £7,500
- Last 80: £5,000
- Last 112: £2,500
- Highest break: £15,000
- Total: £1,205,000

== Summary ==
=== Qualifying rounds ===
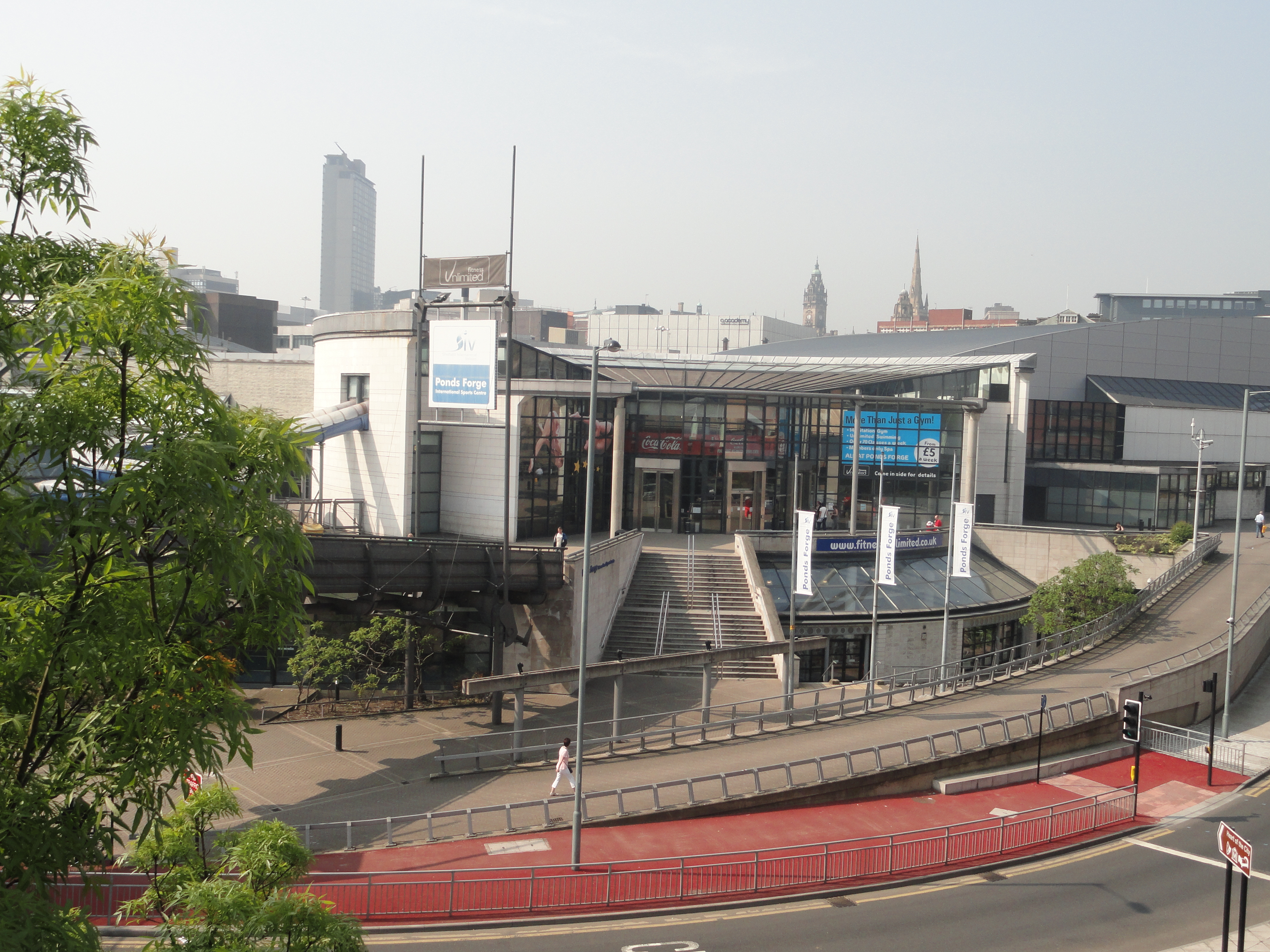
Qualifying rounds were held at Ponds Forge in Sheffield.

Qualifying took place from 5 to 10 November at Ponds Forge in Sheffield. Five-time UK champion Stephen Hendry withdrew from the tournament because the qualifying schedule conflicted with his obligations at the 2022 Champion of Champions, where he was working as a commentator and pundit for ITV. Although Hendry blamed the World Snooker Tour for refusing to rearrange his matches to accommodate his television commitments, his withdrawal was criticised by players including John Higgins, who stated that "[Hendry] shouldn't be taking up the space if he is going to pull out".

==== First qualification round ====
The 1992 winner Jimmy White whitewashed Victor Sarkis. Alfie Burden trailed 16-year-old Liam Davies 1–4, but won five consecutive frames for a 6–4 victory. Ng On-yee defeated Jenson Kendrick 6–4, becoming the first woman to win a match at a Triple Crown event since Reanne Evans defeated Robin Hull in the 2017 World Championship qualifiers. Marco Fu, who had recently reached the final of the 2022 Hong Kong Masters, made three consecutive century breaks as he defeated Bai Langning 6–2.

==== Second qualification round ====
Jimmy White secured a second consecutive whitewash as he defeated Mitchell Mann. Thepchaiya Un-Nooh defeated Martin O'Donnell in a deciding frame, making breaks of 69, 67, 59, 126, 99, and 92. David Lilley defeated former semi-finalist David Grace 6–2. Andres Petrov defeated Jackson Page in a decider, while Fu defeated Oliver Lines 6–4, making two centuries in the match. Ashley Hugill defeated Scott Donaldson in a match that lasted six hours and 19 minutes, winning the 53-minute deciding frame at 1:30 am. Controversy arose in the sixth frame of Mark King's match against Oliver Brown when the referee called a foul against King for a push shot. King disputed the referee's decision, calling it "ridiculous", while Brown said he was "100% sure" that his opponent had not committed a foul. King went on to win the match 6–3.

==== Third qualification round ====
Jimmy White trailed Stephen Maguire 1–3 at the mid-session interval, but recovered to win five of the next six frames for a 6–4 victory. Duane Jones defeated Anthony McGill 6–2, while Tom Ford came from 0–3 behind to beat Burden in a decider. Matthew Stevens, who won his only ranking title at the 2003 event, made breaks of 62, 67, 74, 96, and 109 as he defeated Fan Zhengyi 6–2. Zhou Yuelong, who had recently been runner-up at the 2022 Northern Ireland Open, made breaks of 70, 61, 101, and 100 as he defeated Michael White by the same score. Three-time winner Ding Junhui attempted a maximum break in the second frame of his match against Un-Nooh, but missed the final yellow; Ding went on to clinch a 6–2 victory. King came from 1–4 behind against Ben Woollaston to win the deciding frame on the final blue. Petrov defeated former world semi-finalist Gary Wilson 6–4 in a match that featured incidents between the players. In the fifth frame, Wilson tossed his cue on the floor after Petrov fluked a frame-winning shot on the pink. Wilson played on in the sixth frame despite requiring six snookers, and then complained to the referee when Petrov took a bathroom break after eventually winning the frame. The players argued on Twitter after the match. Two-time world finalist Ali Carter came from 1–3 behind against Peter Lines to win five consecutive frames for a 6–3 victory, making a highest break of 130. World number 18 Ricky Walden lost 4–6 to world number 82 Ian Burns.

==== Fourth qualification round ====
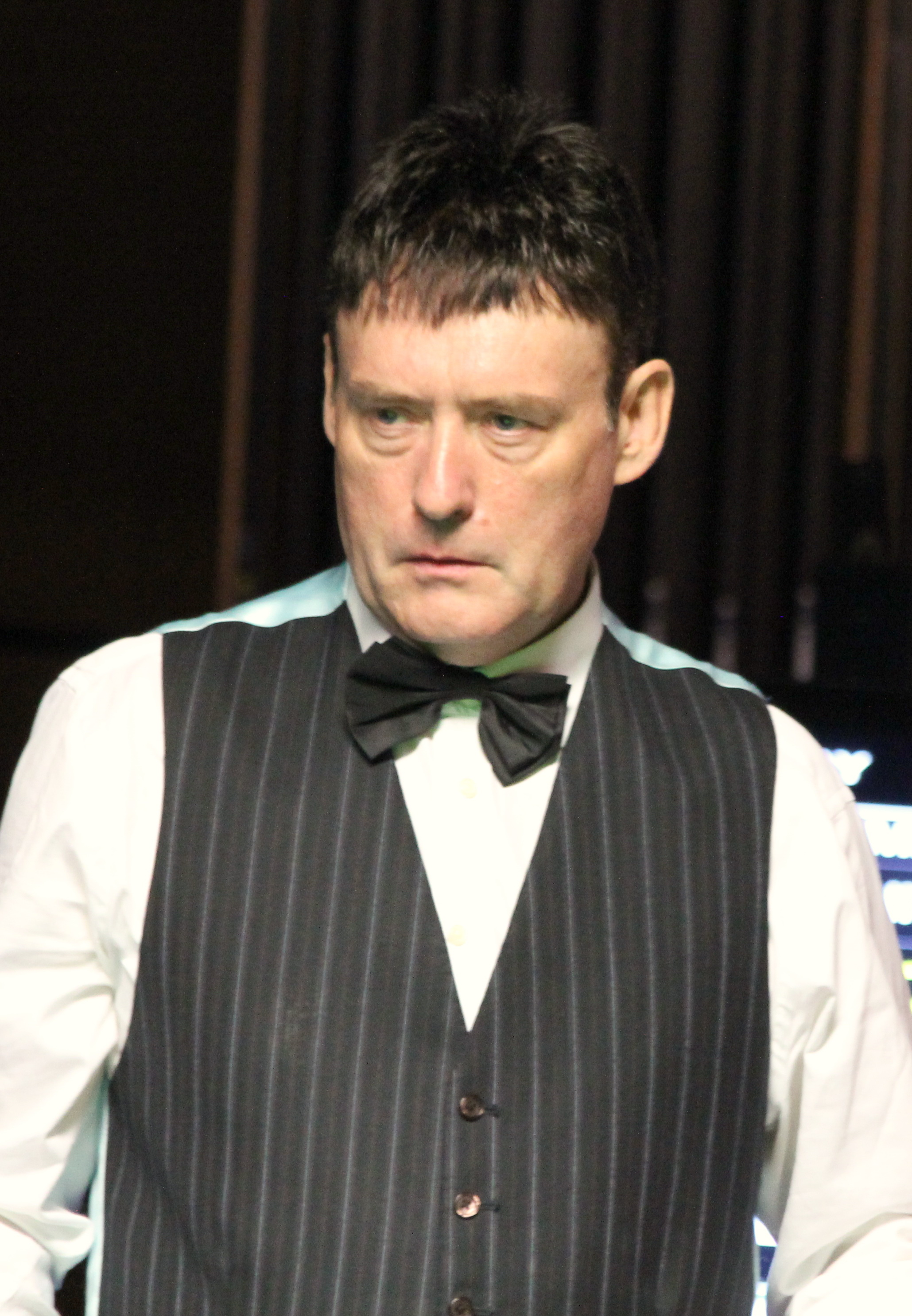
At age 60, Jimmy White (pictured in 2016) won four qualifying matches to reach the last-32 stage of the tournament for the first time since 2010.

In the fourth and final qualifying round, billed as "Judgement Day", Jimmy White defeated Dominic Dale 6–1 to reach the last-32 stage of the tournament for the first time since 2010. He became the oldest player to qualify for the tournament's final stages since 63-year-old Eddie Charlton in 1993. Three-time champion Neil Robertson congratulated White on Twitter, calling his qualification at age 60 "one of the greatest achievements in our sport". Jamie Clarke took a 5–0 lead over Duane Jones, who then won three consecutive frames before Clarke clinched the match 6–3. Ford defeated Noppon Saengkham by the same score, making two centuries and three half-centuries in the match. Xu Si defeated Tian Pengfei 6–4, winning the match on a re-spotted black. Stevens won the first four frames against 19-year-old Wu Yize, making breaks of 126, 63, 75, and 57, but Wu then won five consecutive frames for a 5–4 lead. However, Stevens made a 91 break in the tenth frame to force a decider, which he won with a 58 break.

Hossein Vafaei made breaks of 127 and 111 as he took a 3–1 lead over Robbie Williams at the mid-session interval; Williams reduced Vafaei's lead to one frame at 5–4, but Vafaei clinched a 6–4 victory in the tenth frame. Zhou made breaks of 78, 117, 84, and 72 as he defeated Jak Jones 6–3. Trailing 1–5 in his match against Lyu Haotian, Andy Hicks grew frustrated and smashed the pack of reds open on a break-off shot, going in-off in the process. With ball in hand and the reds spread over the table, Lyu cleared up to win the match 6–1. Jordan Brown advanced with a 6–3 defeat of Zak Surety, making four half-centuries in the match. The previous season's Welsh Open winner Joe Perry whitewashed Graeme Dott, making breaks of 86, 102, 134, and 77. David Gilbert advanced with a whitewash victory over King, while Ding secured his place in York with a 6–4 win over Robert Milkins. Liam Highfield came from 2–5 behind to defeat Carter in a deciding frame; Sam Craigie made breaks of 80, 104, 52, 129 and 79 in his 6–2 win over Burns; and Xiao Guodong advanced with a 6–3 win over Petrov. Matthew Selt secured a 6–4 victory over Anthony Hamilton, making a break of 140 in the match.

=== Main stage ===
==== First round ====
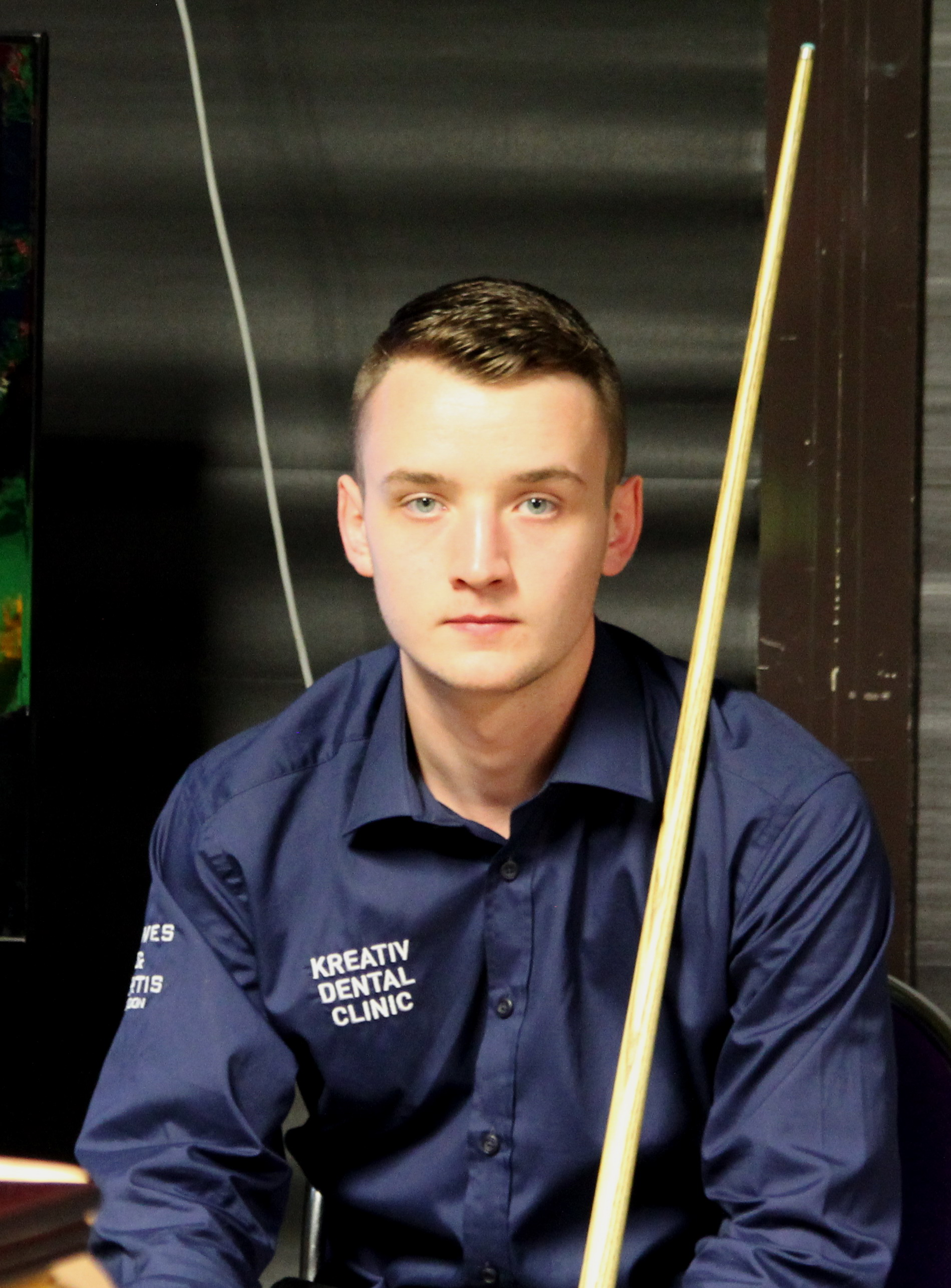
Sam Craigie (pictured in 2015) defeated the defending champion Zhao Xintong 6–2 in the first round.

The first round was played from 12 to 15 November. On the opening day, defending champion Zhao faced world number 47 Craigie. The scores were tied at 2–2 at the mid-session interval, but Craigie won four consecutive frames, finishing with a break of 104, to clinch a 6–2 victory. It was the first time Craigie had reached the last-16 stage of any Triple Crown event. Zhao commented that the pressure of his first title defence had affected his play. Mark Allen faced his Northern Irish compatriot Jordan Brown, the first time the two had played each other in a professional tournament. Brown won the first two frames, but Allen made two centuries as he won five of the next six, and went on to clinch a 6–4 victory. In all, the players made two centuries and six more half-centuries in the ten frames played. Allen commented that he had not looked forward to the match as he had known his good friend Brown since they were 12 years old.

Ryan Day, winner of the previous month's British Open, faced White, who received a standing ovation as he entered the arena. White later called the audience's reaction "magical" and "mind-blowing". Day won the first two frames, but White took the third with a half-century. Day then won three consecutive frames, making centuries of 127 and 105, and went on to win the match 6–2. Facing Selt, Kyren Wilson made two century breaks as he moved into a 5–0 lead. Selt made half-centuries in each of the next three frames, before Wilson wrapped up a 6–3 win with a 74 break in frame nine. Wilson praised the venue, saying that "the event feels very classy now" and that "the UK Championship deserves this".

On 13 November, Perry won the first four frames against third seed Neil Robertson and went on to clinch the match 6–2. Robertson said he had felt unwell during the match, but praised his opponent's positional and safety play. Facing Lyu, the previous year's runner-up Brecel won three consecutive frames to take a 5–3 lead and went on to win the match 6–4. Ford defeated sixth seed John Higgins by the same score, the fourth consecutive time he had beaten him. Higgins's loss in the round of 32 meant that no Scottish player reached the last 16 of the UK Championship for the first time since 1987. Ding trailed tenth seed Barry Hawkins 1–3 at the mid-session interval, but then won five consecutive frames with breaks of 105, 62, 122, 72, and 91 to clinch the match 6–3 and reach the last 16 of a ranking event for the first time in the season. Ding made his 600th career century break during the match, becoming the seventh player in professional snooker history to reach that milestone.

On the following day, the reigning world champion and world number one Ronnie O'Sullivan, recent winner of the 2022 Hong Kong Masters and 2022 Champion of Champions, made two centuries and three more breaks over 70 as he defeated Stevens 6–2 to reach the last 16 of the tournament for the 22nd time. Zhou came from 3–5 behind to defeat 15th seed Yan Bingtao in a deciding frame, with the players making a century and nine more breaks over 50 in the 11 frames played. Seventh seed and two-time winner Mark Williams suffered from food poisoning in his match against Clarke, commenting afterwards that "I was shaking, shivering, boiling hot one frame and freezing cold the next. I tried, but I knew I had no chance". The scores were tied at 3–3, but Clarke won the last three frames to clinch the match 6–3. Stuart Bingham defeated Highfield 6–2.

On 15 November, Xiao faced 2011 winner Judd Trump. The scores were level at 2–2 at the mid-session interval, with Trump having made a 97 in the second frame and Xiao a 118 in the third. Xiao won frame five after a safety battle on the brown, but Trump won the next two frames to lead 4–3. Trump had a chance to win the eighth frame on the colours, but Xiao levelled at 4–4 after Trump missed the brown. Trump won the ninth frame with a 60 break but Xiao made his own 60 break in the tenth to tie the scores again at 5–5. In the decider, Xiao missed a plant, leaving a red over the corner pocket. Trump made an 88 break to clinch the match 6–5. Calling his record at the UK Championship "atrocious", Trump commented afterwards: "I'm happy to get through because I love the prestige of this event and I'd have been devastated to be going home after the first game". Jack Lisowski defeated Xu 6–1, making breaks of 73, 83, and 66. "There were no fireworks, but it was nice to win comfortably", he commented afterwards.

Fifth seed and two-time winner Mark Selby faced Vafaei, who won the opening frame with an 80 break. Selby won the second frame with a century, but missed the pink along the top cushion in the third; Vafaei won the frame by doubling the pink to a baulk corner pocket. Selby levelled the scores at 2–2 at the mid-session interval. Vafaei then won two consecutive frames, making a 119 break in the sixth, but Selby responded with a 129 to win the seventh. Vafaei made an 88 break in the eighth to lead 5–3 and went on to clinch a 6–4 victory in the tenth after snookering Selby on the final yellow. Vafaei, who had also defeated Selby in the previous year's event, reached the last 16 of the tournament for a second consecutive year. Gilbert faced the 2008 winner Shaun Murphy. The players shared the first four frames, and Gilbert took the fifth with an 83 break. In the sixth, Gilbert missed a red to a middle pocket while on a 67 break and Murphy cleared to force a re-spotted black, which he potted after a lengthy safety exchange to tie the scores at 3–3. Murphy made a 63 clearance to win the seventh, but Gilbert won two consecutive frames, making an 86 in frame nine, for a 5–4 lead. However, Murphy made a 133 break in the tenth to force a deciding frame, which he won with breaks of 48 and 46 for a 6–5 victory. "I am so proud because at 5–4 down I could have folded, but that's never been my way", Murphy said afterwards.

In all, seven of the top-16 seeds—Zhao, Robertson, Higgins, Williams, Hawkins, Yan, and Selby—exited the tournament in the first round.

==== Second round ====
The second round was played on 16 and 17 November. On 16 November, O'Sullivan whitewashed Zhou 6–0, making breaks of 137, 82, and 103, while Zhou only reached double figures in one frame. O'Sullivan acknowledged he did not play at his best, but said that the same had been true of his recent opponents, commenting that "my bad is better than everyone else's bad". Facing the 11th seed Brecel, Ford won the first two frames and took a 54-point lead in the third, but Brecel won it with a 61 clearance. In the fourth frame, Ford had a 46-point lead with 51 remaining on the table, but Brecel produced another clearance to level the scores at the mid-session interval. Ford won the fifth frame with a 79 break but Brecel tied the scores again in the sixth after winning a safety battle on the green. Ford then won three consecutive frames, making a 100 break in the seventh, clinching the match 6–3 and reaching the 15th ranking quarter-final of his career. "Before this event I'd hardly won a game this season, so getting into the quarters of the UK is a great achievement", said Ford afterwards. Also on 16 November, Craigie faced 16th seed Day, making centuries of 103, 130, and 103 as he took a 4–2 lead. Day won the next two frames, making a 112 break in the eighth, to tie the scores at 4–4. However, Craigie won the ninth frame with breaks of 41 and 36, and then made a 77 break in the tenth to win the match 6–4 and reach his second ranking quarter-final, having previously reached that stage at the 2019 China Open. "Ryan [Day] put me under pressure at 4–4 so I was pleased to come through that", Craigie commented. Facing Allen, eighth seed Kyren Wilson won the first two frames as Allen struggled with his long potting. However, Allen won six of the next seven, making breaks of 60, 70, 96, 84, 80, and 70, to secure a 6–3 victory and reach the quarter-finals of the tournament for a sixth time. "I had a slow start and gifted the first two frames to Kyren. At 2–2 I felt very relaxed because I felt I had broken the back of the match", Allen said afterwards.

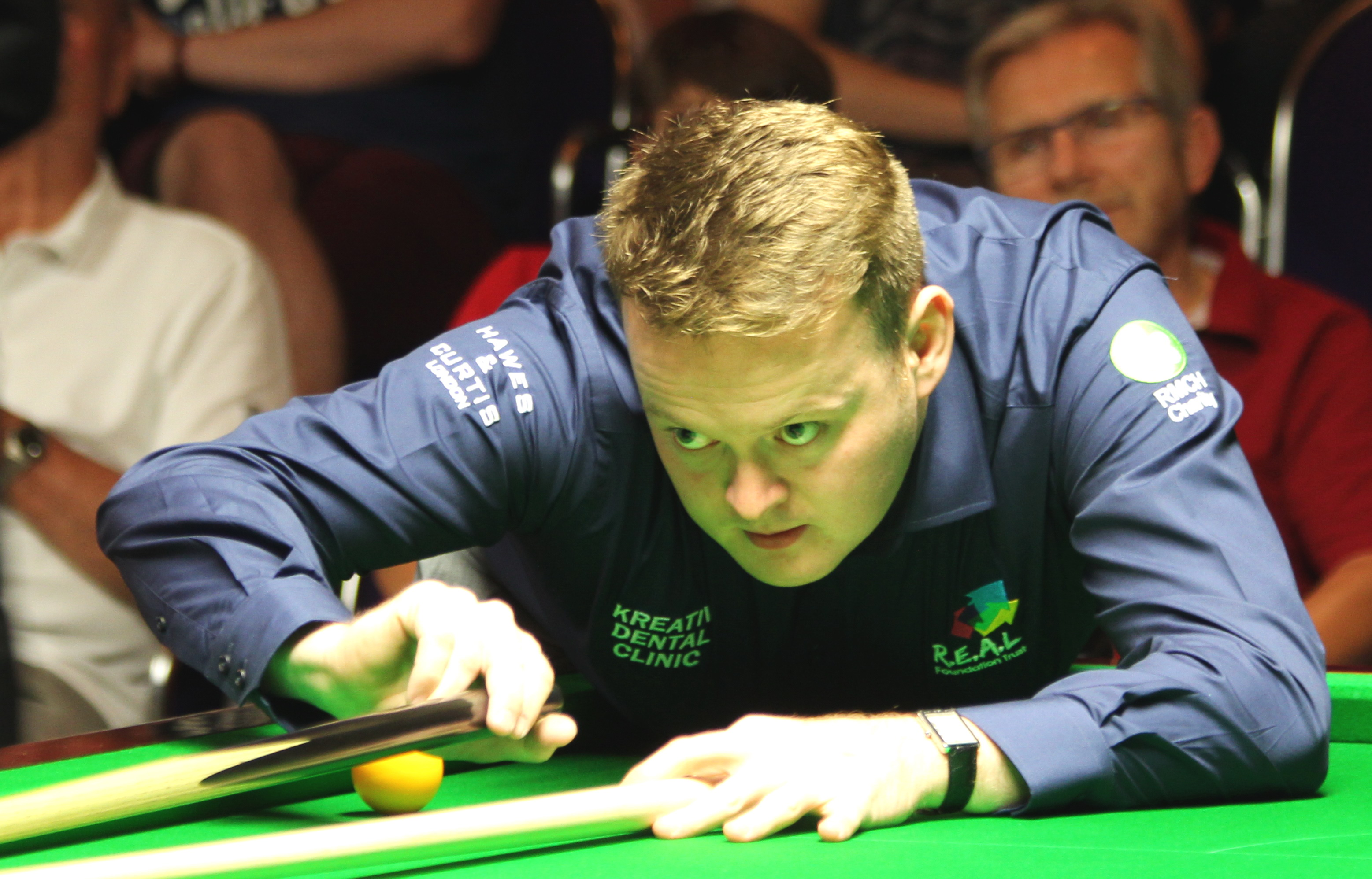
Despite suffering from shoulder and neck pain, Shaun Murphy (pictured in 2015) defeated fourth seed Judd Trump in a second-round deciding frame.

On 17 November, fourth seed Trump faced 13th seed Murphy, who earlier in the day had posted on Twitter that he was suffering from "terrible" neck and shoulder pain. Murphy won the opening frame with a 100 break before Trump levelled the scores with an 89. In frame three, Trump had a 36-point lead with two reds remaining, but Murphy took the frame with a 43 clearance. Trump then won the next three frames to lead 4–2. In the seventh, Murphy ended a lengthy tactical battle on the colours by potting a long brown, reducing Trump's lead to 4–3. Frame eight came down to a safety battle on the last red, which Trump won to go 5–3 ahead. Murphy made a 110 break to win the ninth and attempted a maximum break in the tenth; he lost position on the penultimate red, but his 104 forced a deciding frame. Murphy made a break of 44 in the decider; Trump had an opportunity to respond, but missed a red to a corner pocket, after which Murphy made 53 to win the match. "As the dust settles and I think about where that features in my best wins, it will probably be up there", commented Murphy. Facing Clarke, Ding made breaks of 99, 87, and 118 as he took a 4–0 lead at the mid-session interval. Although Clarke won the fifth frame, Ding made 67 breaks in both the sixth and seventh frames to win 6–1.

In the final second-round matches, Lisowski faced Vafaei, who scored only 14 points in the first three frames as Lisowski moved into a 3–0 lead. Vafaei won the fourth with a 111 break. After the mid-session interval, Lisowski won the fifth frame and Vafaei the sixth. Lisowski made a 101 in the seventh to lead 5–2, and wrapped up a 6–2 victory in frame eight after Vafaei missed a pot on the yellow and slammed his cue on the floor in frustration, receiving a warning from referee Leo Scullion. Facing 14th seed Bingham, Perry made a break of 93 to win the opening frame before Bingham won the second with a 78. Perry took the third frame, but Bingham levelled the scores at 2–2 with a 103. After the mid-session interval, Perry won three consecutive frames with breaks of 82, 82, and 75 to take a 5–2 lead. Even though Bingham won the eighth frame with his second century of the match, Perry made a 64 break in the ninth and went on to wrap up a 6–3 victory, reaching the quarter-finals of the tournament for an eighth time.

==== Quarter-finals ====
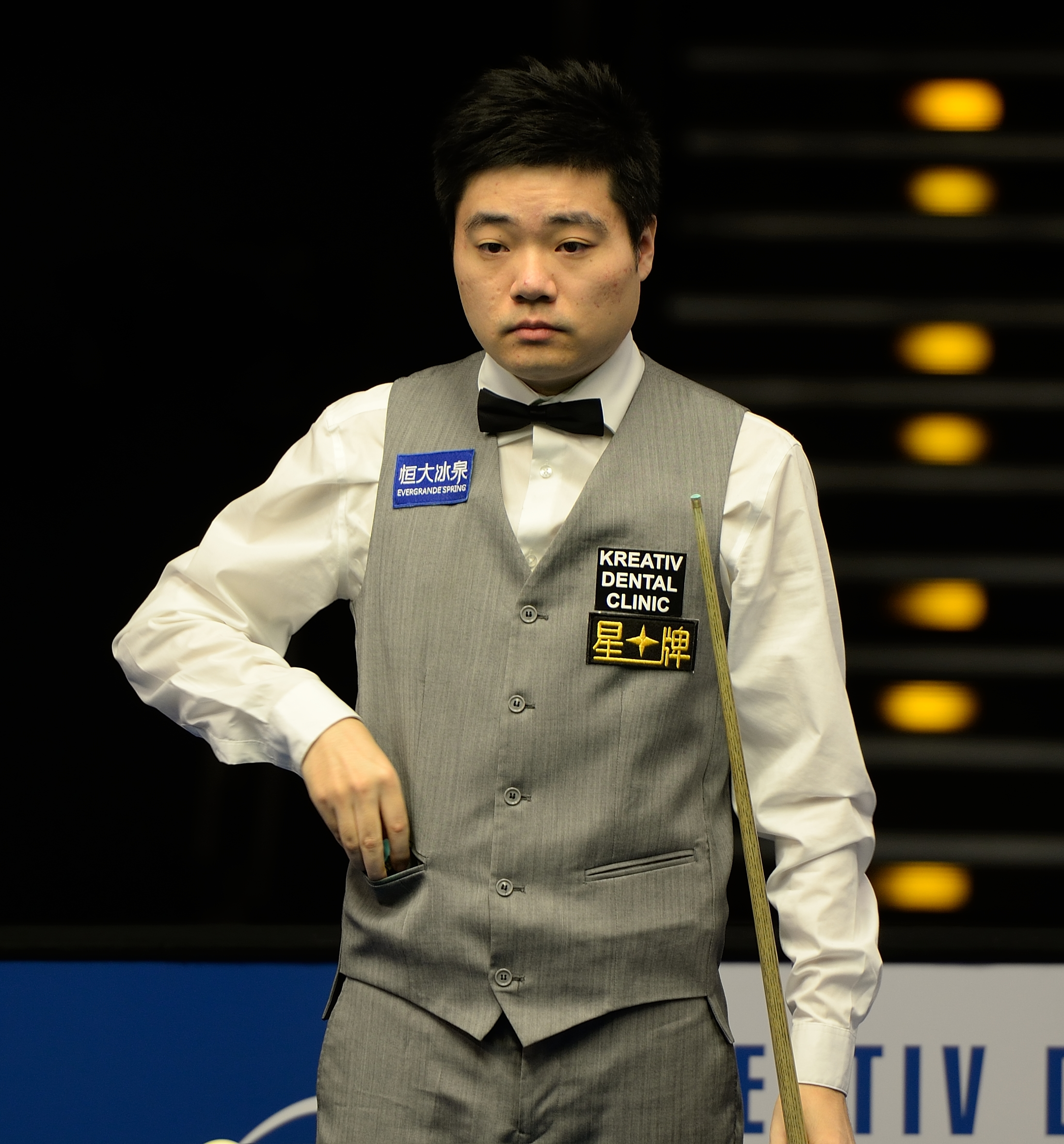
Ding Junhui (pictured in 2015) became the first player to whitewash world number one Ronnie O'Sullivan in a Triple Crown event when he won their quarter-final 6–0. Ding went on to reach his first ranking final in three years.

The quarter-finals were played on 18 November, featuring four top-16 seeds (O'Sullivan, Allen, Lisowski, and Murphy) and four qualifiers (Craigie, Perry, Ford, and Ding), with O'Sullivan the only top-eight player to reach that stage. Ding faced O'Sullivan, who missed a black off the spot and made a number of safety errors in the first frame, which Ding won. In frame two, O'Sullivan missed the last red while trailing by six points, and Ding moved 2–0 ahead. Ding made an 88 break to take the third frame, and took advantage of a fluke in frame four to make a 94 break and go 4–0 ahead at the mid-session interval. After play resumed, Ding produced breaks of 87 and 131 as he wrapped up a 6–0 whitewash, with O'Sullivan having scored just four points in the last four frames of the match. It was the first time O'Sullivan had been whitewashed in any Triple Crown event. O'Sullivan said afterwards: "Ding played fantastically well. It's brilliant to see Ding play like that and I wish he played like that more because he's so good for the game".

Facing Perry, Ford made breaks of 103 and 62 to win the first two frames, before Perry made a 70 break to take the third. In frame four, Perry led by 28 points but missed the penultimate red; Ford made a 41 clearance to take a 3–1 lead at the mid-session interval. Perry won two consecutive frames with breaks of 101 and 66 to draw level at 3–3, but Ford made an 86 break to win the seventh. Perry required a snooker on the green in the eighth and succeeded in getting it, but then missed a pot on the green to a middle pocket; Ford won the frame to go 5–3 ahead. Ford missed the last red in the ninth while leading by 26 points and Perry won the frame with a clearance. However, Ford wrapped up a 6–4 win in frame ten, helped by a break of 52, to reach the second UK Championship semi-final of his career.

Lisowski began his match against Murphy with a 67 break before missing a blue to the middle pocket, which gave Murphy the chance to make a 67 clearance and force a re-spotted black. Lisowski potted the black for a 1–0 lead and went on to make a record-equalling four consecutive century breaks of 105, 127, 123, and 100 as he extended his lead to 5–0. Lisowski became the eighth player—the others being Neil Robertson, John Higgins, Gary Wilson, Allen, Murphy, Maguire, and Lu Ning—to make four consecutive centuries in professional competition. Murphy made a 111 century in frame six and led in frame seven, but declared a push shot foul on himself that allowed Lisowski to wrap up a 6–1 victory and reach the semi-finals of a Triple Crown event for the first time. Murphy commented on Lisowski's performance: "Every time I made a small mistake, I had to sit down and admire the wondrous talent pouring out of this young man that we have seen coming for a long time".

Craigie won the first frame against Allen with a break of 74, but Allen won the next two, making a 105 break in the third. In the fourth frame, Allen succeeded in getting the snooker he required on the final pink, but Craigie potted the pink to tie the scores at 2–2 at the mid-session interval. When play resumed, Craigie took a 4–2 lead with breaks of 84 and 104, but Allen won three frames in a row with breaks of 50, 108, and 92 to lead 5–4. Allen won the match 6–4 in the tenth frame to reach the semi-finals for a fifth time. "I wasn't timing the ball well tonight but I hung in there. I was really good mentally, thinking good thoughts", commented Allen after the match.

==== Semi-finals ====
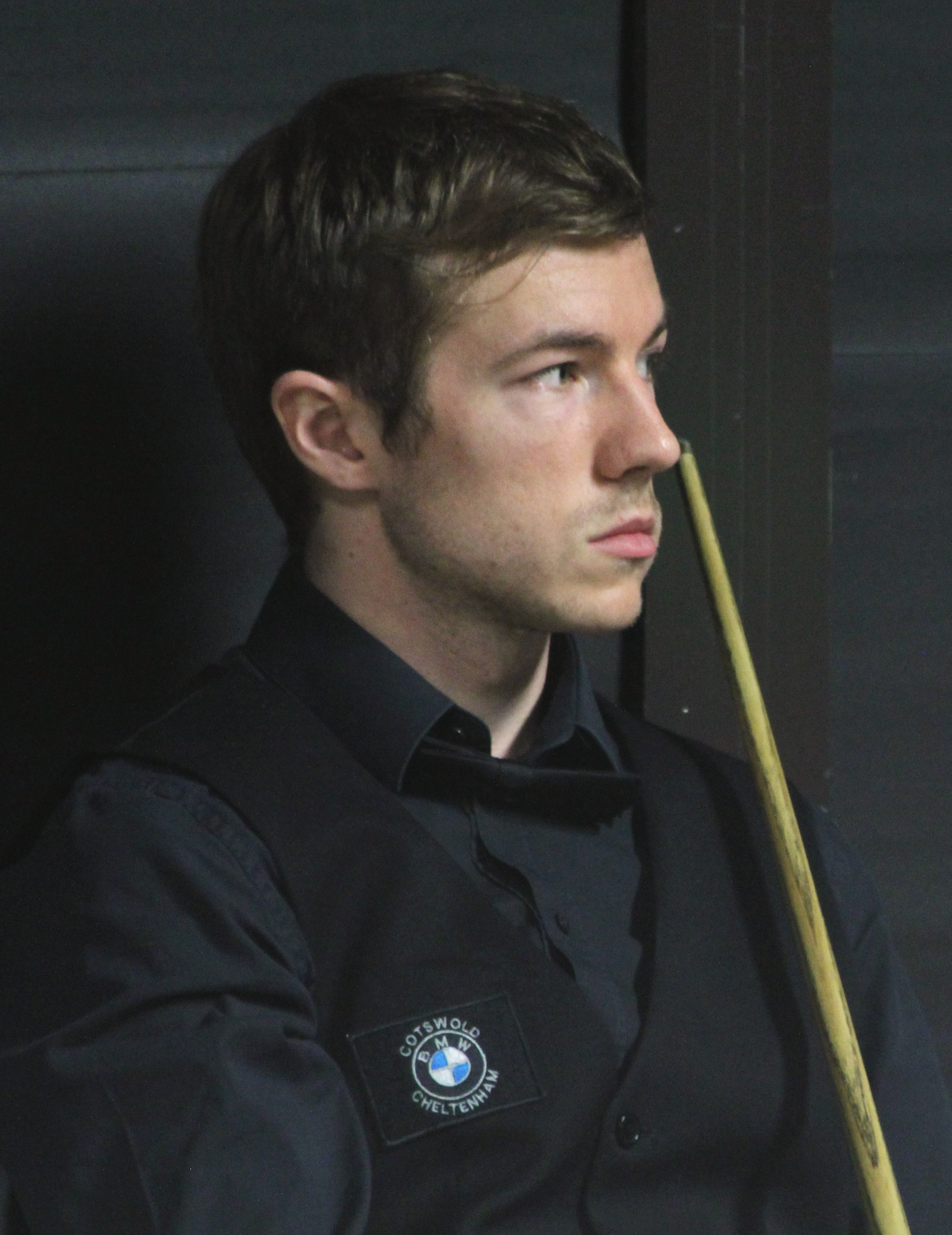
Jack Lisowski (pictured in 2016) played in the semi-finals of a Triple Crown event for the first time, but lost in a deciding frame to eventual champion Mark Allen.

The semi-finals were played on 19 November. Two top-16 seeds (Allen and Lisowski) and two qualifiers (Ding and Ford) reached this stage, with world number nine Allen the highest-ranked player among the semi-finalists. Ding won the first frame against Ford after he snookered his opponent behind the yellow with two reds remaining and then cleared the table. Ding won frame two with a 55 break, and took advantage of positional errors and missed pots by Ford to win the third. An 84 break gave Ding a 4–0 lead at the mid-session interval. When play resumed, Ford was on a 46 break before missing the pink; Ding responded to make a 62 clearance and lead 5–0. However, Ford came back with breaks of 77, 64, and 64 to win the next three frames and trail 3–5. Ford attempted a maximum break in the ninth frame, potting eight reds and eight blacks, but missed the ninth red, giving Ding the opportunity to make a 37 break. Ford then played a poor safety shot that left one of the two remaining reds over the middle pocket, allowing Ding to wrap up a 6–3 victory.

Lisowski won the first two frames against Allen, making a 58 break in the first and a 77 break in the second. The third frame hinged on a safety battle on the last red; Allen eventually potted the red and cleared to win the frame. Allen made a 63 break in the fourth frame to tie the scores at 2–2 at the mid-session interval. Lisowski won the fifth after Allen missed a shot on the black. Lisowski required a snooker on the yellow in the sixth, which he successfully obtained, only to make a safety error that gave Allen an opportunity to pot the yellow and tie the scores again at 3–3. Lisowski took the seventh frame with the help of a 54 break, and won the eighth after a safety battle on the last two reds, taking a 5–3 lead. In the ninth, Allen potted a four-ball plant and made a 115 break, the only century of the match, to reduce Lisowski's lead to 5–4. Allen then made a 74 break in the tenth after Lisowski missed a long red, forcing a deciding frame. Allen had the first chance in the decider and made a break of 36 before running out of position; Lisowski responded with 57 before failing to get position on the last red. After tactical battles on the last red and the yellow, Lisowski potted the yellow but missed the green. It was Lisowski's last shot of the match as Allen cleared from the green to win the match 6–5 on the final black ball. "Throughout the match I felt I got the better of the safety battles so when it came down to the last red in the decider, I felt I would get a chance", said Allen afterwards. However, he added that "[Lisowski] was the better player tonight and probably deserved to win".

==== Final ====
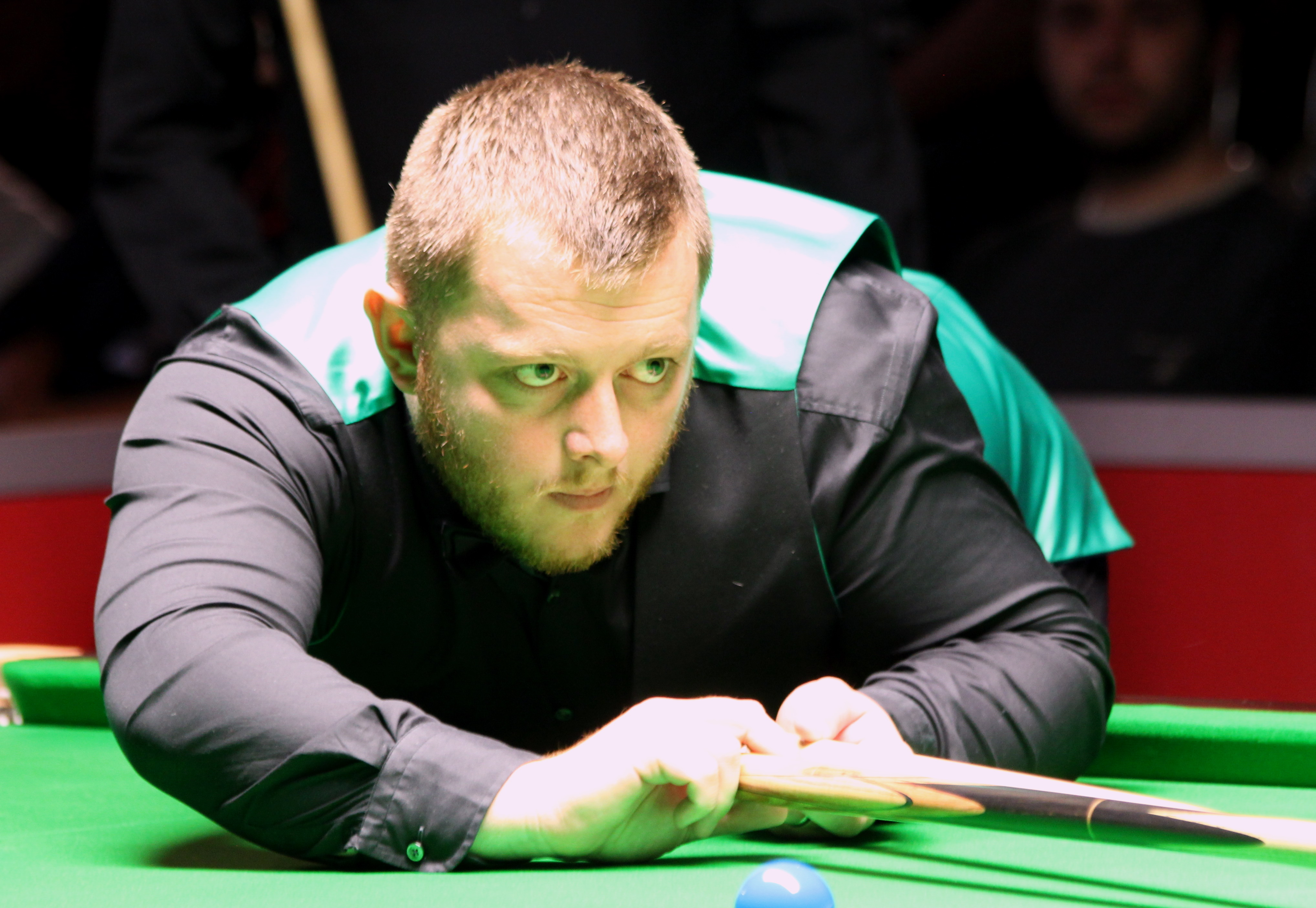
Mark Allen (pictured in 2016) came from 1–6 behind in the final to defeat Ding Junhui 10–7 and win the UK Championship for the first time.

The final was played over two sessions on 20 November as a best-of-19-frame match between world number nine Allen and world number 38 Ding. Allen competed in his third UK Championship final, having been runner-up to Trump in 2011 and to O'Sullivan in 2018. Ding contested his fourth UK final, having won the title on three previous occasions, in 2005, 2009, and 2019. It was the 16th ranking final of Allen's career and his third of the season, following the 2022 British Open and the 2022 Northern Irish Open. It was Ding's 21st ranking final, but his first since he had won the tournament three years previously. The final was officiated by Desislava Bozhilova, who became the first woman to referee a UK Championship final.

In the afternoon session, Allen missed a red in the opening frame while on a break of 24 and Ding replied with a 52 break to go 1–0 up. Ding made a 70 break in frame two to lead 2–0, but Allen won a safety battle on the yellow in the third to put his first frame on the scoreboard at 2–1. However, Ding made back-to-back centuries of 126 and 135, extending his lead to 4–1. Allen had several chances to win the sixth frame, but Ding clinched it after Allen missed the final blue; Ding then made a 102 break in frame seven, his third century of the session, to move 6–1 in front. Allen won the last frame of the afternoon with a 79 break as the session ended 6–2 in Ding's favour. Speaking as a pundit for Eurosport, O'Sullivan criticised Allen's play during the session, calling it "the worst I think I've seen from anybody in a long, long time".

In the evening session, Allen made breaks of 60, 93, and 132 in the opening three frames, reducing his arrears to one at 5–6. On a break of 56 in the 12th frame, Allen went in-off. Ding secured the two snookers he needed, but missed a pot on the green, after which Allen levelled the scores at 6–6. Allen also took the next two frames with breaks of 59 and 109. After losing seven frames in a row, Ding took frame 15 with a 105 break to trail 7–8. However, Allen made breaks of 42 and 32 in the 16th frame for a 9–7 lead and then clinched the match in the 17th frame, which lasted over 40 minutes, eventually clearing from the penultimate red to win 10–7. It was Allen's first UK Championship title, his eighth ranking title, and his second Triple Crown title. He became the second Northern Irish player to win the UK Championship, following Alex Higgins in 1983. His comeback from 1–6 behind also saw him overcome the largest deficit in a UK Championship final since Higgins came from 0–7 behind to defeat Steve Davis 16–15 in that year. Allen had trailed by at least two frames in every match he played in the tournament. "To beat Ding in the best of 19 frames match when being 6–1 down is one of my best-ever wins—he's an absolute legend", said Allen. Allen's win took him from ninth to fifth place in the world rankings, while Ding as runner-up advanced from 38th to 19th place.

== Main draw ==
The draw for the main stage of the tournament is shown below. Players in bold denote match winners.

=== Top half ===
**Last 32**; Best of 11 frames
1	Zhao Xintong (CHN)	2
**47**	**Sam Craigie (ENG)**	**6**
**16**	**Ryan Day (WAL)**	**6**
89	Jimmy White (ENG)	2
**9**	**Mark Allen (NIR)**	**6**
22	Jordan Brown (NIR)	4
**8**	**Kyren Wilson (ENG)**	**6**
26	Matthew Selt (ENG)	3
5	Mark Selby (ENG)	4
**20**	**Hossein Vafaei (IRN)**	**6**
**12**	**Jack Lisowski (ENG)**	**6**
73	Xu Si (CHN)	1
**13**	**Shaun Murphy (ENG)**	**6**
19	David Gilbert (ENG)	5
**4**	**Judd Trump (ENG)**	**6**
34	Xiao Guodong (CHN)	5

**Last 16**; Best of 11 frames
**47**	**(England) Sam Craigie**	**6**
16	(Wales) Ryan Day	4
**9**	**(Northern Ireland) Mark Allen**	**6**
8	(England) Kyren Wilson	3
20	(Iran) Hossein Vafaei	2
**12**	**(England) Jack Lisowski**	**6**
**13**	**(England) Shaun Murphy**	**6**
4	(England) Judd Trump	5

**Quarter-finals**; Best of 11 frames
47	(England) Sam Craigie	4
**9**	**(Northern Ireland) Mark Allen**	**6**
**12**	**(England) Jack Lisowski**	**6**
13	(England) Shaun Murphy	1

**Semi-finals**; Best of 11 frames
**9**	**(Northern Ireland) Mark Allen**	**6**
12	(England) Jack Lisowski	5

=== Bottom half ===
**Last 32**; Best of 11 frames
3	Neil Robertson (AUS)	2
**30**	**Joe Perry (ENG)**	**6**
**14**	**Stuart Bingham (ENG)**	**6**
42	Liam Highfield (ENG)	2
**11**	**Luca Brecel (BEL)**	**6**
36	Lyu Haotian (CHN)	4
6	John Higgins (SCO)	4
**32**	**Tom Ford (ENG)**	**6**
7	Mark Williams (WAL)	3
**49**	**Jamie Clarke (WAL)**	**6**
10	Barry Hawkins (ENG)	3
**38**	**Ding Junhui (CHN)**	**6**
15	Yan Bingtao (CHN)	5
**21**	**Zhou Yuelong (CHN)**	**6**
**2**	**Ronnie O'Sullivan (ENG)**	**6**
60	Matthew Stevens (WAL)	2

**Last 16**; Best of 11 frames
**30**	**(England) Joe Perry**	**6**
14	(England) Stuart Bingham	3
11	(Belgium) Luca Brecel	3
**32**	**(England) Tom Ford**	**6**
49	(Wales) Jamie Clarke	1
**38**	**(China) Ding Junhui**	**6**
21	(China) Zhou Yuelong	0
**2**	**(England) Ronnie O'Sullivan**	**6**

**Quarter-finals**; Best of 11 frames
30	(England) Joe Perry	4
**32**	**(England) Tom Ford**	**6**
**38**	**(China) Ding Junhui**	**6**
2	(England) Ronnie O'Sullivan	0

**Semi-finals**; Best of 11 frames
32	(England) Tom Ford	3
**38**	**(China) Ding Junhui**	**6**

=== Final ===
Final: Best of 19 frames. Referee: Desislava Bozhilova; York Barbican, York, England, 20 November 2022
**Mark Allen** (9); Northern Ireland	**10**–7	Ding Junhui (38); China
Afternoon: 44–**67**, 14–**80**, **68**–36, 0–**126** (126), 0–**135** (135), 53–**67**, 6–**126** (102), **86**–0; Evening: **76**–33, **93**–0, **132**–0 (132), **76**–48, **73**–30, **110**–0 (109), 0–**126** (105), **74**–1, **60**–43
132	Highest break	**135**
2	Century breaks	**4**

== Qualifying draw ==
The results of the qualifying rounds are shown below. The match winners are shown in bold.

**Round 1 (Last 144)**; Best of 11 frames
81	**Duane Jones** (WAL)	**6**
Reanne Evans (ENG)	3
112	Himanshu Jain (IND)	4
**Peng Yisong** (CHN)	**6**
96	**Alfie Burden** (ENG)	**6**
a	Liam Davies (WAL)	4
97	**Andy Lee** (HKG)	**6**
Rebecca Kenna (ENG)	3
104	**James Cahill** (ENG)	**6**
a	Liam Graham (SCO)	2
89	**Jimmy White** (ENG)	**6**
Victor Sarkis (BRA)	0
105	**Sanderson Lam** (ENG)	**6**
a	Amaan Iqbal (SCO)	1
88	**Andrew Pagett** (WAL)	**w/o**
Stephen Hendry (SCO)	w/d
85	**Michael White** (WAL)	**6**
a	Jake Crofts (ENG)	0
108	Julien Leclercq (BEL)	3
**Mohamed Ibrahim** (EGY)	**6**
92	Chen Zifan (CHN)	2
a	**Farakh Ajaib** (PAK)	**6**
101	**Ng On-yee** (HKG)	**6**
Jenson Kendrick (ENG)	4
100	**Lukas Kleckers** (GER)	**6**
a	Lewis Ullah (ENG)	1
93	**Dean Young** (SCO)	**6**
a	Lee Stephens (ENG)	1
109	Mink Nutcharut (THA)	0
**Fergal O'Brien** (IRL)	**6**
84	Barry Pinches (ENG)	5
**Asjad Iqbal** (PAK)	**6**
83	**Fraser Patrick** (SCO)	**6**
Ken Doherty (IRL)	4
110	**Oliver Brown** (ENG)	**6**
a	Ross Muir (SCO)	3
94	**John Astley** (ENG)	**6**
a	Robbie McGuigan (NIR)	2
99	**David Lilley** (ENG)	**6**
a	Joel Connolly (NIR)	1
102	Ben Mertens (BEL)	4
a	**Martin O'Donnell** (ENG)	**6**
91	**Dylan Emery** (WAL)	**6**
Adam Duffy (ENG)	4
107	**Zak Surety** (ENG)	**6**
a	Brad Ferguson (WAL)	0
86	**Si Jiahui** (CHN)	**6**
Allan Taylor (ENG)	0
87	**Michael Judge** (IRL)	**6**
Dechawat Poomjaeng (THA)	4
106	**Ashley Hugill** (ENG)	**6**
a	Ryan Davies (ENG)	1
90	Aaron Hill (IRL)	2
**Muhammad Asif** (PAK)	**6**
103	**Marco Fu** (HKG)	**6**
Bai Langning (CHN)	2
98	Sean O'Sullivan (ENG)	1
a	**Callum Beresford** (ENG)	**6**
95	Jamie O'Neill (ENG)	5
**Andres Petrov** (EST)	**6**
111	**Rod Lawler** (ENG)	**6**
Ryan Thomerson (AUS)	1
82	**Ian Burns** (ENG)	**6**
Anton Kazakov (UKR)	3

**Round 2 (Last 112)**; Best of 11 frames
80	Louis Heathcote (ENG)	2
81	**Duane Jones** (WAL)	**6**
49	**Jamie Clarke** (WAL)	**6**
Peng Yisong (CHN)	0
65	Alexander Ursenbacher (SUI)	4
96	**Alfie Burden** (ENG)	**6**
64	Mark Davis (ENG)	4
97	**Andy Lee** (HKG)	**6**
57	**Dominic Dale** (WAL)	**6**
104	James Cahill (ENG)	4
72	Mitchell Mann (ENG)	0
89	**Jimmy White** (ENG)	**6**
56	**Tian Pengfei** (CHN)	**6**
105	Sanderson Lam (ENG)	1
73	**Xu Si** (CHN)	**6**
88	Andrew Pagett (WAL)	1
76	Zhang Jiankang (CHN)	1
85	**Michael White** (WAL)	**6**
53	**Mark Joyce** (ENG)	**6**
Mohamed Ibrahim (EGY)	0
69	**Wu Yize** (CHN)	**6**
a	Farakh Ajaib (PAK)	1
60	**Matthew Stevens** (WAL)	**6**
101	Ng On-yee (HKG)	0
61	**Stuart Carrington** (ENG)	**6**
100	Lukas Kleckers (GER)	3
68	**Andy Hicks** (ENG)	**6**
93	Dean Young (SCO)	1
52	**Robbie Williams** (ENG)	**6**
Fergal O'Brien (IRL)	2
77	Gerard Greene (NIR)	4
**Asjad Iqbal** (PAK)	**6**
78	**Lei Peifan** (CHN)	**6**
83	Fraser Patrick (SCO)	4
51	**Mark King** (ENG)	**6**
110	Oliver Brown (ENG)	3
67	**Yuan Sijun** (CHN)	**6**
94	John Astley (ENG)	1
62	David Grace (ENG)	2
99	**David Lilley** (ENG)	**6**
59	**Thepchaiya Un-Nooh** (THA)	**6**
a	Martin O'Donnell (ENG)	5
70	**Zhang Anda** (CHN)	**6**
91	Dylan Emery (WAL)	4
54	Elliot Slessor (ENG)	2
107	**Zak Surety** (ENG)	**6**
75	Chang Bingyu (CHN)	2
86	**Si Jiahui** (CHN)	**6**
74	**Peter Lines** (ENG)	**6**
87	Michael Judge (IRL)	4
55	Scott Donaldson (SCO)	5
106	**Ashley Hugill** (ENG)	**6**
71	**Hammad Miah** (ENG)	**6**
Muhammad Asif (PAK)	4
58	Oliver Lines (ENG)	4
103	**Marco Fu** (HKG)	**6**
63	**Cao Yupeng** (CHN)	**6**
a	Callum Beresford (ENG)	0
66	Jackson Page (WAL)	5
**Andres Petrov** (EST)	**6**
50	**Joe O'Connor** (ENG)	**6**
111	Rod Lawler (ENG)	5
79	Craig Steadman (ENG)	4
82	**Ian Burns** (ENG)	**6**

**Round 3 (Last 80)**; Best of 11 frames
17	Anthony McGill (SCO)	2
81	**Duane Jones** (WAL)	**6**
48	Pang Junxu (CHN)	3
49	**Jamie Clarke** (WAL)	**6**
32	**Tom Ford** (ENG)	**6**
96	Alfie Burden (ENG)	5
33	**Noppon Saengkham** (THA)	**6**
97	Andy Lee (HKG)	2
40	Li Hang (CHN)	4
57	**Dominic Dale** (WAL)	**6**
25	Stephen Maguire (SCO)	4
89	**Jimmy White** (ENG)	**6**
41	Chris Wakelin (ENG)	5
56	**Tian Pengfei** (CHN)	**6**
24	Jimmy Robertson (ENG)	4
73	**Xu Si** (CHN)	**6**
21	**Zhou Yuelong** (CHN)	**6**
85	Michael White (WAL)	2
44	**Jak Jones** (WAL)	**6**
53	Mark Joyce (ENG)	4
28	Jamie Jones (WAL)	4
69	**Wu Yize** (CHN)	**6**
37	Fan Zhengyi (CHN)	2
60	**Matthew Stevens** (WAL)	**6**
36	**Lyu Haotian** (CHN)	**6**
61	Stuart Carrington (ENG)	3
29	Lu Ning (CHN)	5
68	**Andy Hicks** (ENG)	**6**
45	Liang Wenbo (CHN)	w/d
52	**Robbie Williams** (ENG)	**w/o**
20	**Hossein Vafaei** (IRN)	**6**
Asjad Iqbal (PAK)	4
19	**David Gilbert** (ENG)	**6**
78	Lei Peifan (CHN)	2
46	Ben Woollaston (ENG)	5
51	**Mark King** (ENG)	**6**
30	**Joe Perry** (ENG)	**6**
67	Yuan Sijun (CHN)	5
35	**Graeme Dott** (SCO)	**6**
99	David Lilley (ENG)	5
38	**Ding Junhui** (CHN)	**6**
59	Thepchaiya Un-Nooh (THA)	2
27	**Robert Milkins** (ENG)	**6**
70	Zhang Anda (CHN)	3
43	Martin Gould (ENG)	1
107	**Zak Surety** (ENG)	**6**
22	**Jordan Brown** (NIR)	**6**
86	Si Jiahui (CHN)	4
23	**Ali Carter** (ENG)	**6**
74	Peter Lines (ENG)	3
42	**Liam Highfield** (ENG)	**6**
106	Ashley Hugill (ENG)	1
26	**Matthew Selt** (ENG)	**6**
71	Hammad Miah (ENG)	1
39	**Anthony Hamilton** (ENG)	**6**
103	Marco Fu (HKG)	3
34	**Xiao Guodong** (CHN)	**6**
63	Cao Yupeng (CHN)	3
31	Gary Wilson (ENG)	4
**Andres Petrov** (EST)	**6**
47	**Sam Craigie** (ENG)	**6**
50	Joe O'Connor (ENG)	4
18	Ricky Walden (ENG)	3
82	**Ian Burns** (ENG)	**6**

**Round 4 (Last 48)**; Best of 11 frames
81	Duane Jones (WAL)	3
49	**Jamie Clarke** (WAL)	**6**
32	**Tom Ford** (ENG)	**6**
33	Noppon Saengkham (THA)	3
57	Dominic Dale (WAL)	1
89	**Jimmy White** (ENG)	**6**
56	Tian Pengfei (CHN)	4
73	**Xu Si** (CHN)	**6**
21	**Zhou Yuelong** (CHN)	**6**
44	Jak Jones (WAL)	3
69	Wu Yize (CHN)	5
60	**Matthew Stevens** (WAL)	**6**
36	**Lyu Haotian** (CHN)	**6**
68	Andy Hicks (ENG)	1
52	Robbie Williams (ENG)	4
20	**Hossein Vafaei** (IRN)	**6**
19	**David Gilbert** (ENG)	**6**
51	Mark King (ENG)	0
30	**Joe Perry** (ENG)	**6**
35	Graeme Dott (SCO)	0
38	**Ding Junhui** (CHN)	**6**
27	Robert Milkins (ENG)	4
107	Zak Surety (ENG)	3
22	**Jordan Brown** (NIR)	**6**
23	Ali Carter (ENG)	5
42	**Liam Highfield** (ENG)	**6**
26	**Matthew Selt** (ENG)	**6**
39	Anthony Hamilton (ENG)	4
34	**Xiao Guodong** (CHN)	**6**
Andres Petrov (EST)	3
47	**Sam Craigie** (ENG)	**6**
82	Ian Burns (ENG)	2

== Century breaks ==
=== Main stage centuries ===
A total of 52 century breaks were made in the main stage of the tournament. (Note: The latest archived version of the century list provided by the World Snooker Tour points to a tally of 50 century breaks. However, two are missing: a 105 by Ding Junhui and a 109 by Mark Allen, both in the final.)

- 137, 107, 103, 102 – Ronnie O'Sullivan
- 135, 131, 126, 122, 118, 105, 105, 102 – Ding Junhui
- 133, 111, 110, 104, 100 – Shaun Murphy
- 132, 115, 113, 109, 108, 105, 105 – Mark Allen
- 130, 104, 104, 103, 103 – Sam Craigie
- 129, 100 – Mark Selby
- 128 – Zhou Yuelong
- 127, 123, 105, 101, 100 – Jack Lisowski
- 127, 112, 105 – Ryan Day
- 124 – Luca Brecel
- 119, 111 – Hossein Vafaei
- 118 – Xiao Guodong
- 103, 102 – Stuart Bingham
- 103, 101 – Kyren Wilson
- 103, 100 – Tom Ford
- 102, 101 – Joe Perry

=== Qualifying stage centuries ===
A total of 74 century breaks were made in qualifying.

- 144 – Cao Yupeng
- 140, 112 – Matthew Selt
- 140 – Li Hang
- 135, 116 – Ashley Hugill
- 135 – Chen Zifan
- 134, 108 – Andy Hicks
- 134, 103 – Dylan Emery
- 134, 102 – Joe Perry
- 132, 120 – Yuan Sijun
- 130 – Ali Carter
- 129, 124, 108, 106, 103 – Marco Fu
- 129, 121, 104, 100 – Sam Craigie
- 129 – Jak Jones
- 127 – Zak Surety
- 127, 111 – Hossein Vafaei
- 126, 109 – Matthew Stevens
- 126, 105 – Thepchaiya Un-Nooh
- 124 – Fan Zhengyi
- 123, 120 – Ding Junhui
- 123, 113 – Fraser Patrick
- 123 – Peter Lines
- 122 – Jordan Brown
- 121 – Dominic Dale
- 121 – Pang Junxu
- 120 – Robbie Williams
- 119, 107 – Michael White
- 117, 101, 100 – Zhou Yuelong
- 117 – Jamie Clarke
- 116 – Andy Lee
- 116 – Si Jiahui
- 113 – Julien Leclercq
- 113 – Wu Yize
- 112, 109, 106 – Duane Jones
- 112 – Xu Si
- 111 – Anthony Hamilton
- 109, 101 – David Lilley
- 108, 102 – Tom Ford
- 108, 100 – Stephen Maguire
- 106 – David Gilbert
- 106 – Lyu Haotian
- 106 – Ross Muir
- 103 – Alfie Burden
- 103 – Andres Petrov
- 103 – Jimmy White
- 102 – Mark Joyce
- 102 – Lyu Haotian
- 101 – Ryan Davies
- 100 – Tian Pengfei
