= 2021 World Grand Prix (snooker) =

Snooker tournament

2021 Cazoo World Grand Prix
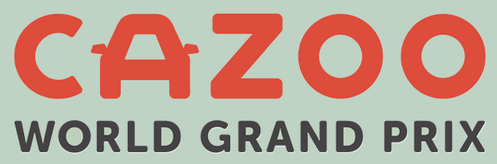

Tournament information
- Dates: 13–19 December 2021
- Venue: Coventry Building Society Arena
- City: Coventry
- Country: England
- Organisation: World Snooker Tour
- Format: Ranking event
- Total prize fund: £380,000
- Winner's share: £100,000
- Highest break: Stephen Maguire (SCO) (139)

Final
- Champion: Ronnie O'Sullivan (ENG)
- Runner-up: Neil Robertson (AUS)
- Score: 10–8

The 2021 World Grand Prix (officially the 2021 Cazoo World Grand Prix) was a professional snooker tournament that took place from 13 to 19 December 2021 at the Coventry Building Society Arena in Coventry, England. The event was the first of three events to make up the Cazoo Cup in the 2021–22 snooker season.

The defending champion was Judd Trump, who overcame Jack Lisowski 10–7 in the previous year's final. However, he lost 3–4 in the round of 16 to Tom Ford.

Ronnie O'Sullivan won the tournament for a second time, defeating Neil Robertson 10–8 in the final.

== Prize fund ==
The breakdown of prize money for the event is shown below:

- Winner: £100,000
- Runner-up: £40,000
- Semi-final: £20,000
- Quarter-final: £12,500
- Last 16: £7,500
- Last 32: £5,000
- Highest break: £10,000
- Total: £380,000

== Seeding list ==
The top 32 players on the one-year ranking list, up to and including the 2021 Scottish Open, qualified for the tournament. Seedings were based on the order of the player in that list.

Seed	Player	Total points
1	Zhao Xintong (CHN)	206,000
2	Luca Brecel (BEL)	170,000
3	Mark Williams (WAL)	116,000
4	John Higgins (SCO)	109,000
5	Mark Allen (NIR)	108,000
6	David Gilbert (ENG)	86,000
7	Ronnie O'Sullivan (ENG)	75,000
8	Neil Robertson (AUS)	74,000
9	Kyren Wilson (ENG)	66,000
10	Gary Wilson (ENG)	63,500
11	Ricky Walden (ENG)	53,000
12	Barry Hawkins (ENG)	51,000
13	Judd Trump (ENG)	50,500
14	Anthony McGill (SCO)	48,500
15	Jimmy Robertson (ENG)	46,000
16	Yan Bingtao (CHN)	45,500
17	Mark King (ENG)	44,000
18	Matthew Selt (ENG)	37,000
19	Stephen Maguire (SCO)	36,500
20	Ben Woollaston (ENG)	33,500
21	Mark Selby (ENG)	32,000
22	Stuart Bingham (ENG)	31,500
23	Hossein Vafaei (IRN)	31,000
24	Anthony Hamilton (ENG)	31,000
25	Noppon Saengkham (THA)	31,000
26	Andy Hicks (ENG)	30,500
27	Ali Carter (ENG)	30,500
28	Cao Yupeng (CHN)	29,000
29	Tom Ford (ENG)	28,500
30	Jack Lisowski (ENG)	28,500
31	Jordan Brown (NIR)	27,000
32	Martin Gould (ENG)	25,000

== Tournament draw ==
Last 32; Best of 7 frames
1	Zhao Xintong (CHN)	2
32	Martin Gould (ENG)	4
16	Yan Bingtao (CHN)	4
17	Mark King (ENG)	1
9	Kyren Wilson (ENG)	3
24	Anthony Hamilton (ENG)	4
8	Neil Robertson (AUS)	4
25	Noppon Saengkham (THA)	0
5	Mark Allen (NIR)	4
28	Cao Yupeng (CHN)	1
12	Barry Hawkins (ENG)	1
21	Mark Selby (ENG)	4
13	Judd Trump (ENG)	4
20	Ben Woollaston (ENG)	2
4	John Higgins (SCO)	2
29	Tom Ford (ENG)	4
3	Mark Williams (WAL)	3
30	Jack Lisowski (ENG)	4
14	Anthony McGill (SCO)	0
19	Stephen Maguire (SCO)	4
11	Ricky Walden (ENG)	3
22	Stuart Bingham (ENG)	4
6	David Gilbert (ENG)	1
27	Ali Carter (ENG)	4
7	Ronnie O'Sullivan (ENG)	4
26	Andy Hicks (ENG)	1
10	Gary Wilson (ENG)	1
23	Hossein Vafaei (IRN)	4
15	Jimmy Robertson (ENG)	4
18	Matthew Selt (ENG)	2
2	Luca Brecel (BEL)	4
31	Jordan Brown (NIR)	1

Last 16; Best of 7 frames
32	(England) Martin Gould	0
16	(China) Yan Bingtao	4
24	(England) Anthony Hamilton	1
8	(Australia) Neil Robertson	4
5	(Northern Ireland) Mark Allen	2
21	(England) Mark Selby	4
13	(England) Judd Trump	3
29	(England) Tom Ford	4
30	(England) Jack Lisowski	3
19	(Scotland) Stephen Maguire	4
22	(England) Stuart Bingham	4
27	(England) Ali Carter	3
7	(England) Ronnie O'Sullivan	4
23	(Iran) Hossein Vafaei	1
15	(England) Jimmy Robertson	4
2	(Belgium) Luca Brecel	3

Quarter-finals; Best of 9 frames
16	(China) Yan Bingtao	4
8	(Australia) Neil Robertson	5
21	(England) Mark Selby	5
29	(England) Tom Ford	2
19	(Scotland) Stephen Maguire	1
22	(England) Stuart Bingham	5
7	(England) Ronnie O'Sullivan	5
15	(England) Jimmy Robertson	2

Semi-finals; Best of 11 frames
8	(Australia) Neil Robertson	6
21	(England) Mark Selby	3
22	(England) Stuart Bingham	2
7	(England) Ronnie O'Sullivan	6

Final; Best of 19 frames
8	(Australia) Neil Robertson	8
7	(England) Ronnie O'Sullivan	10

=== Final ===
Final: Best of 19 frames. Referee: Brendan Moore; Coventry Building Society Arena, Coventry, England, 19 December 2021
Neil Robertson (8); Australia	8–10	Ronnie O'Sullivan (7); England
Afternoon: 73–1, 75–33, 50–62, 49–81, 71–12, 87–0, 12–115, 66–72; Evening: 66–5, 37–91, 128–0 (128), 88–49, 0–90, 32–80, 0–77, 8–77, 83–0, 7–77
128	Highest break	90
1	Century breaks	0

== Century breaks ==
A total of 23 century breaks were made by 15 players during the tournament.

- 139 – Stephen Maguire
- 133, 130 – Tom Ford
- 128, 117, 108, 100 – Neil Robertson
- 128 – Jack Lisowski
- 124, 105 – Stuart Bingham
- 119 – Hossein Vafaei
- 117 – Mark Williams
- 114 – Mark Allen
- 114 – Kyren Wilson
- 112, 107 – Ronnie O'Sullivan
- 112, 104 – Mark Selby
- 111 – Yan Bingtao
- 106 – Jimmy Robertson
- 105, 100 – Luca Brecel
- 101 – Zhao Xintong
