= Hossein Vafaei =

Iranian snooker player (born 1994)

Personal information
- Nickname: The Prince of Persia
- Born: 15 October 1994 (age 32) Abadan, Iran

Sport
- Country: Iran
- Sport: Snooker
- Professional: 2012–present
- Highest ranking: 15 (October 2023)
- Current ranking: 30 (as of 7 November 2026)
- Maximum breaks: 1
- Century breaks: 182 (as of 17 November 2026)

Tournament wins
- Ranking: 1
Medal record
Representing Iran
Men's Snooker
Asian Indoor and Martial Arts Games
Gold medal – first place	2017 Ashgabat	Team
Silver medal – second place	2017 Ashgabat	Singles

Hossein Vafaei (Persian: حسین وفایی; born 15 October 1994) is an Iranian professional snooker player. The first professional player from Iran, Vafaei won his maiden ranking title at the 2022 Snooker Shoot Out, defeating Mark Williams in the final. He reached a career-high world ranking of 15 in October 2023. He compiled his first professional maximum break during the qualifying rounds of the 2022 European Masters.

Vafaei has a strong record in Triple Crown tournaments, reaching his first major semi-final at the 2023 UK Championship and the quarter-finals of the 2023 Masters on his debut. He was the first Iranian to compete at the World Snooker Championship in 2022 and recorded his first win at the Crucible in 2023. At the 2026 World Snooker Championship, he reached his first quarter-final after defeating world number one Judd Trump 13–12 in the second round.

As an amateur, Vafaei won both the IBSF World Snooker Championship and the IBSF World Under-21 Snooker Championship. Although he first qualified for the professional tour in 2012, his early career was significantly hampered by recurring visa issues that prevented him from competing in the United Kingdom. He was eventually awarded a special tour card in 2014 due to the visa issues and has been a professional player since.

== Amateur career ==
Vafaei entered the 2009 IBSF World Under-21 Snooker Championship, reaching the last 16 before losing 5–3 to Liu Chuang. The following year, he represented Iran at the 2010 Asian Games in Guangzhou, reaching the last 16 of the snooker singles before being defeated 4–1 by Dechawat Poomjaeng. In December 2010, he reached the last 16 of the IBSF World Snooker Championship, losing 5–1 to Leo Fernandez.

In April 2011, Vafaei reached the final of the ACBS Asian Under-21 Snooker Championship, where he lost 3–7 to Cao Yupeng. Later in the month he participated in the ACBS Asian Snooker Championship, but did not progress past the group stage. In September 2011, he received a wildcard to participate at the professional Shanghai Masters event, but could not advance to the first round as he lost 5–1 against Fergal O'Brien. Vafaei won the IBSF World Snooker Championship in December 2011. He defeated Lee Walker 10–9 in the final to become the youngest winner of the tournament at 17 years and 81 days, breaking the record previously held by Ian Preece.

Vafaei's World Amateur victory earned him a two-year card for the professional World Snooker Tour, beginning with the 2012/2013 season. However, recurring visa issues prevented him from traveling to the United Kingdom for much of the next three seasons. During this period, he continued to compete in amateur and regional events. In April 2012, he won the ACBS Asian Under-21 Snooker Championship by defeating Zhang Anda 6–2 in the final. He also reached the semi-finals of the 2012 ACBS Asian Snooker Championship, where he lost 6–3 to Aditya Mehta. He also reached the semi-finals of ACBS Asian Snooker Championship, where he lost 6–3 to Aditya Mehta. In his first season with a tour card, he was only able to compete in the Six-red World Championship in Thailand, where he lost in the last 16 to Judd Trump, and in event 2 of the Asian Players Tour in China, where he lost to Li Yuan in the last 64.

In 2013, he represented Iran at the Asian Indoor and Martial Arts Games in Incheon, reaching the quarter-finals in both the snooker singles and six-red singles events. He also participated in the Snooker at the 2013 World Games – men's singles, losing 3–0 to Lyu Haotian in the first round. In May 2014, he won his second world title at the IBSF World Under-21 Snooker Championship. During the tournament, he compiled the first 147 break in the history of the event during his 7–3 semi-final victory over Mateusz Baranowski. He defeated Josh Boileau 8–3 in the final to secure the championship.

== Professional career ==
=== Early years and visa issues (2014–2016) ===
In June 2014, Vafaei received a special dispensation to compete on the Main Tour for the 2014–15 snooker season. He became the first professional player from Iran. In late February 2015, it was confirmed that Vafaei had gained a visa, allowing him to enter the 2015 World Snooker Championship, where he lost 10–3 to Anthony McGill in the opening qualifying round. Vafaei then qualified for the first ranking event of the 2015/2016 season season, the 2015 Australian Goldfields Open, by beating Charlie Walters 5–3, Zak Surety 5–3, Lee Walker 5–4 and Dominic Dale 5–3. In his debut at the venue stage of a ranking event, Vafaei played Michael White in the opening round where he lost 3–5. He also played in the UK Championship and the Welsh Open, losing 6–1 and 4–2 to Luca Brecel and Robin Hull, respectively, in the first round of each tournament.

During the 2016/17 season, Vafaei reached his first ranking quarter-final at the 2016 Northern Ireland Open, defeating Rod Lawler, Surety, Sanderson Lam, and Scott Donaldson before losing 3–5 to Mark King. At the 2017 China Open, he defeated world number two Judd Trump 5–3 to reach his first semi-final of a ranking event, where he was defeated 1–6 by Mark Williams. He narrowly missed out on World Championship qualification after a 8–10 loss to Tom Ford in the final qualifying round, but his performances secured his place in the world's top 64.

=== Top-64 player (2017–2021) ===
Vafaei continued to climb the rankings over the next four seasons. At the 2019 Welsh Open, he defeated Mark Selby and Scott Donaldson before losing to Neil Robertson. Later that year, at the 2019 China Championship, he reached another semi-final by defeating Kyren Wilson, Anthony McGill, and Joe Perry, eventually losing a close match 6–5 to Mark Williams. He ended the 2019/20 season ranked 41st in the world.

In the 2020–21 snooker season, Vafaei reached the quarter-finals of the World Grand Prix after wins over Zhou Yuelong and Ding Junhui. Vafaei compiled his first official professional maximum break (147) during the qualifying rounds of the 2022 European Masters in July 2022. The break was made during the sixth frame of his 5–1 victory over Ng On-yee.

=== Ranking event winner (2022–present) ===
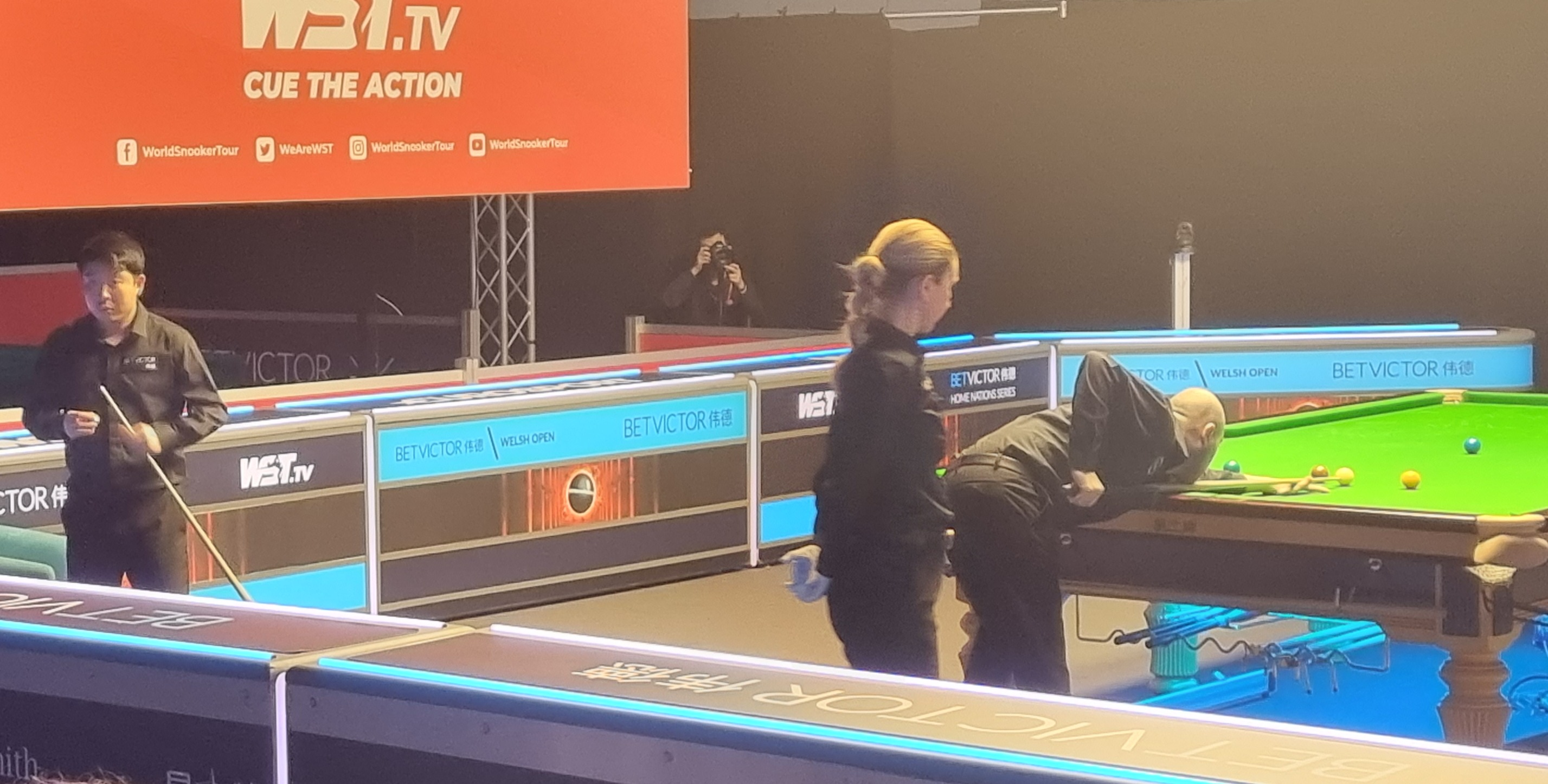
Vafaei at the 2022 Welsh Open quarter-final against Zhang Anda.

Vafaei made his debut at the Masters at the 2023 event.

Vafaei won his first ranking title at the 2022 Snooker Shoot Out in January 2022. He defeated Mark Williams in the final with a break of 71, dedicating the win to his late grandmother. He reached the semi-final of the 2022 Welsh Open, losing in a deciding frame to Judd Trump 5–6. Later that season, he became the first Iranian to play at the main stages of the World Snooker Championship by qualifying for the 2022 event, where he lost 4–10 to Trump in the first round.

He recorded consecutive victories over Selby in major televised events during the 2022–23 snooker season, winning 6–4 at the 2022 UK Championship and 6–2 on his debut at the 2023 Masters. Vafaei had received a late entry into the Masters—an invitational event usually reserved for the top 16—after the suspension of Zhao Xintong during a match-fixing investigation. He reached the quarter-finals before losing 4–6 to Jack Lisowski. At the 2023 World Snooker Championship, Vafaei made history as the first Iranian to win a match at the Crucible, defeating Ding Junhui 10–6 in the first round. He was defeated in the second round by Ronnie O'Sullivan.

Vafaei reached the semi-finals of the 2023 British Open, where he was defeated by Williams, and then progressed to the semi-finals for the first time in a Triple Crown event at the 2023 UK Championship. He defeated Shaun Murphy, Matthew Selt, and Zhang Anda before being beaten 2–6 by O'Sullivan. He also reached the quarter-finals of the 2024 World Open, recording another win over O'Sullivan (5–4) before losing to Ding.

Vafaei's career was hampered by a spinal injury that first surfaced in early 2024. The condition caused persistent nerve pain in his neck, shoulder, and left arm, significantly affecting his cue action. Due to the pain, he was unable to practice at his usual intensity, and his results suffered as a consequence. At the 2025 World Grand Prix, Vafaei reached the quarter-finals despite his injury, but was whitewashed by Trump in a match where he managed only 31 points. His ranking had fallen as low as 32nd in the world, which forced him back into the qualifying rounds for major events. Having qualified for the 2025 World Snooker Championship, Vafaei trailed for most of his opening-round match against Barry Hawkins but fired in four centuries to force a deciding frame. During the decider, he let out an emotional roar mid-clearance after potting a difficult red, eventually winning 10–9. He was eventually defeated 10–13 by Mark Williams in the second round.

By the start of the 2025–26 snooker season, Vafaei confirmed that rest and specialized physiotherapy in Iran had allowed the injury to heal. Having fallen in the rankings, he was required to win three matches to qualify for the 2026 World Snooker Championship. He entered the tournament as the world number 32 and became the only qualifier of the year to reach the second round after winning nine consecutive frames to beat Si Jiahui 10–3. He subsequently defeated world number one Judd Trump 13–12 in the second round—his best performance at the Crucible—before losing his quarter-final match to Wu Yize.

== Personal life ==
Vafaei was born in Abadan, Iran on 15 October 1994, an oil-rich city in southwestern Iran. Within his family, he is known as the "Miracle Kid" because his father recovered from a deep coma after being declared dead by doctors years before Hossein was born. Snooker had been banned in Iran for over 20 years following the 1979 Iranian Revolution due to its association with gambling; the ban was only overturned in 2000, allowing Vafaei to take up the sport as a child shortly after it became legal again. He grew up in an environment still marked by the detritus of the Iran–Iraq War, learning to play on a "dusty table with a ripped cloth" at the age of six after his father introduced him to a local club. Vafaei has expressed frustration at the lack of official financial support or rewards from the Iranian sporting authorities, noting that he had to overcome a domestic federation that initially pressured him to remain an amateur to represent the national side.

He has frequently spoken about the emotional and professional toll of his visa struggles, noting that the inability to travel meant he "lost three years" of his prime development. In 2022, Vafaei dedicated his victory at the 2022 Snooker Shoot Out to his grandmother, who died on the eve of the tournament; he revealed he had nearly withdrawn from the event due to grief.

During the 2026 World Snooker Championship, Vafaei faced emotional strain due to the outbreak of the 2026 Iran war. In an interview with BBC Sport, he revealed that receiving "bad texts" from home made it nearly impossible to focus, stating, "No-one knows how tough it is... you get a bad text in the day and you can't focus on your job." He commented that the safety of his family was his primary concern during his World Championship campaign. Despite confirming his family was safe in Abadan, he described the period as "very, very hard," adding that he viewed his performance at the Crucible as a way to provide a "proud moment" and a "lift" for the Iranian people. This emotional burden followed a physically challenging season where he had struggled with a spinal injury that caused nerve pain in his shoulder and fingers.

Vafaei is noted for his outspoken personality and a high-profile rivalry with Ronnie O'Sullivan. In 2022, he publicly called for O'Sullivan to retire, suggesting he was "disrespectful" to the game. Vafaei had taken offense to a "disrespectful" break off O'Sullivan had made during qualification for the 2022 German Masters, which Vafaei had won 5–0. Ahead of their match at the 2023 World Snooker Championship, Vafaei remarked that O'Sullivan was "a nice person when he's asleep." O'Sullivan won the match 13–2. Following a victory over Judd Trump at the 2026 World Snooker Championship, a humbler Vafaei joked in the BBC studio that he had learned it was better to "shut my mouth and listen", a comment that drew laughter from pundits Steve Davis and Joe Perry.

== Performance and rankings timeline ==
Tournament	2011/ 12	2012/ 13	2013/ 14	2014/ 15	2015/ 16	2016/ 17	2017/ 18	2018/ 19	2019/ 20	2020/ 21	2021/ 22	2022/ 23	2023/ 24	2024/ 25	2025/ 26	2026/ 27
Ranking (Note: It shows the ranking at the beginning of the season)	(Note: He was an amateur)	(Note: New players on the Main Tour don't have a ranking)	97	(Note: Players qualified through special dispensation started the season without prize money ranking points)	126	89	59	45	40	41	41	17	17	21	24	28
Ranking tournaments
Championship League	Non-Ranking Event									RR	RR	2R	RR	2R	A	3R
China Open	A	A	A	A	LQ	SF	WD	3R	Tournament Not Held							2R
Wuhan Open	Tournament Not Held												LQ	2R	2R	1R
British Open	Tournament Not Held										4R	LQ	SF	1R	LQ	LQ
English Open	Tournament Not Held					A	QF	2R	3R	4R	1R	1R	2R	2R	1R	1R
Shenzhen Open (Note: The event was called the Xi'an Grand Prix (2024/2025–2025/2026))	Tournament Not Held													3R	LQ	1R
Northern Ireland Open	Tournament Not Held					QF	2R	1R	1R	1R	LQ	2R	2R	1R	1R	1R
International Championship	NH	A	A	A	LQ	LQ	WD	2R	WD	Not Held			1R	2R	2R	QF
UK Championship	A	WD	A	A	1R	1R	3R	3R	1R	3R	4R	2R	SF	LQ	LQ	
Shoot Out	Non-Ranking Event					2R	A	2R	1R	2R	W	1R	WD	2R	2R	
Scottish Open	NH	MR	Not Held			2R	1R	WD	1R	2R	2R	3R	LQ	1R	2R	
German Masters	A	A	A	A	LQ	A	LQ	LQ	LQ	LQ	LQ	LQ	WD	WD	LQ	LQ
Welsh Open	A	A	A	A	1R	4R	1R	SF	1R	4R	SF	3R	2R	2R	2R	
World Grand Prix	Not Held			NH	DNQ	DNQ	DNQ	DNQ	DNQ	QF	2R	1R	2R	QF	DNQ	
Players Championship (Note: The event was called the Players Tour Championship Grand Final (2011/2012–2015/2016))	DNQ	DNQ	DNQ	DNQ	DNQ	DNQ	DNQ	DNQ	DNQ	DNQ	1R	DNQ	1R	DNQ	DNQ	
World Open	WR	A	A	Not Held		LQ	WD	A	2R	Not Held			QF	2R	QF	
Tour Championship	Tournament Not Held							DNQ	DNQ	DNQ	DNQ	DNQ	DNQ	DNQ	DNQ	
World Championship	A	A	A	LQ	LQ	LQ	LQ	LQ	LQ	LQ	1R	2R	1R	2R	QF	
Non-ranking tournaments
Shanghai Masters	Ranking Event							A	A	Not Held			2R	A	A	A
Champion of Champions	Not Held		A	A	A	A	A	A	A	A	A	1R	A	A	A	
The Masters	A	A	A	A	A	A	A	A	A	A	A	QF	A	A	A	
Championship League	A	A	A	A	A	A	A	A	A	A	A	A	WD	SF	RR	
Former ranking tournaments
Australian Goldfields Open	A	WD	A	A	1R	Tournament Not Held										
Shanghai Masters	WR	WD	A	A	LQ	A	1R	Non-Ranking		Not Held			Non-Ranking Event			
Indian Open	Not Held		A	A	NH	LQ	3R	2R	Tournament Not Held							
Riga Masters (Note: The event was called the Riga Open (2014/2015–2015/2016))	Not Held			Minor-Ranking		WD	2R	A	WD	Tournament Not Held						
China Championship	Tournament Not Held					NR	1R	3R	SF	Tournament Not Held						
WST Pro Series	Tournament Not Held									RR	Tournament Not Held					
Turkish Masters	Tournament Not Held										2R	Tournament Not Held				
Gibraltar Open	Tournament Not Held				MR	1R	A	A	2R	3R	WD	Tournament Not Held				
WST Classic	Tournament Not Held											3R	Tournament Not Held			
European Masters	Tournament Not Held					WD	1R	WD	LQ	2R	1R	1R	1R	Not Held		
Saudi Arabia Masters	Tournament Not Held													4R	4R	NH
Former non-ranking tournaments
Six-red World Championship	NH	3R	RR	QF	A	A	A	A	A	Not Held		SF	Tournament Not Held			

Performance Table Legend
LQ	lost in the qualifying draw	#R	lost in the early rounds of the tournament (WR = Wildcard round, RR = Round robin)	QF	lost in the quarter-finals
SF	lost in the semi-finals	F	lost in the final	W	won the tournament
DNQ	did not qualify for the tournament	A	did not participate in the tournament	WD	withdrew from the tournament

NH / Not held	means an event was not held.
MR / Minor-ranking event	means an event is/was a minor-ranking event.
NR / Non-ranking event	means an event is/was no longer a ranking event.
R / Ranking event	means an event is/was now a ranking event

== Career finals ==
=== Ranking finals: 1 (1 title) ===
Outcome	No.	Year	Championship	Opponent in the final	Score	Ref
Winner	1.	2022	Snooker Shoot Out	(Wales) Mark Williams	1–0	

=== Pro-am finals: 1 ===
Outcome	No.	Year	Championship	Opponent in the final	Score	Ref
Runner-up	1.	2017	Asian Indoor and Martial Arts Games	(China) Zhao Xintong	2–4	

=== Amateur finals: 4 (3 titles) ===
Outcome	No.	Year	Championship	Opponent in the final	Score	Ref
Runner-up	1.	2011	ACBS Asian Under-21 Championship	(China) Cao Yupeng	3–7	
Winner	1.	2011	World Amateur Snooker Championship	(Wales) Lee Walker	10–9	
Winner	2.	2012	ACBS Asian Under-21 Championship	(China) Zhang Anda	6–2	
Winner	3.	2014	World Amateur Under-21 Championship	(Republic of Ireland) Josh Boileau	8–3	
