= Marcel Eckardt =

German snooker referee (born 1989)

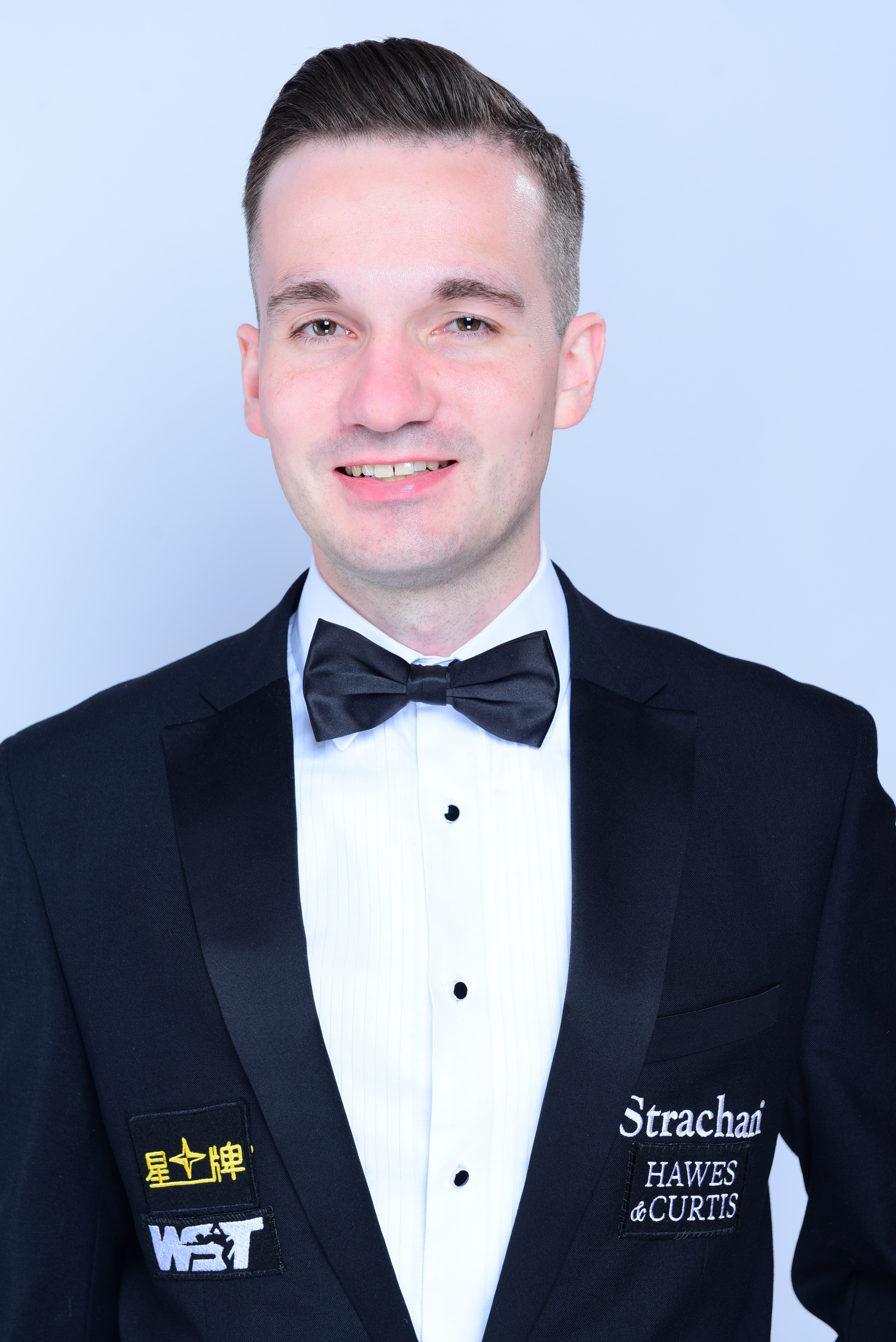
- Eckardt in 2020

Personal information
- Born: 27 October 1989 (age 37) Gera, Thuringia, East Germany

Sport
- Country: Germany
- Sport: Snooker
- Professional: 2013–present

Marcel Eckardt (born 27 October 1989 in Gera, German Democratic Republic) is a German snooker and pool referee.

== Career ==
Eckardt is from Töppeln, close to Gera in German Democratic Republic. At the age of 13 he became interested in snooker while watching Eurosport. With nowhere to play it close to his childhood home, he took up snooker later in his life, and continues to mostly play pool. In 2008 he completed his first course in snooker refereeing, earning the National Association of Thuringia C-licence in Hohenstein-Ernstthal, and later obtained the national B-licence. He first refereed professional players in 2010, during an exhibition tournament in Bruges, featuring Stephen Hendry and Steve Davis, amongst others. The same year he applied to referee the new Players Tour Championship, and he gained experience in European tournaments and in qualification matches for the Main Tour. He refereed his first Players Tour Championship final at the 2012 Paul Hunter Classic, and his first major ranking tournament was the 2012 German Masters.

In the 2013/2014 season Eckardt, aged 23, became the youngest ever member of the referee A-squad, the group of twelve referees licensed to work in the final rounds of all ranked tournaments. Next season he became the youngest person to oversee a ranking tournament final, when he refereed his first ranking final at the 2015 German Masters. From 2015, he refereed at the World Snooker Championships in Sheffield, taking charge of his first semi-final of the event in 2019, and his first final in 2020, at the age of 30, becoming the youngest referee ever to do so, while also being the first German. At the start of 2023, he oversaw the final of the Masters.

Eckardt has been in charge of nine tournament matches that have contained maximum breaks, most notably Ronnie O'Sullivan's record 15th maximum at the 2018 English Open.

== List of ranking finals ==
As of September 2026, Eckardt has refereed 16 ranking finals:

- 2015 German Masters
- 2015 Welsh Open
- 2016 Indian Open
- 2016 European Masters
- 2017 Northern Ireland Open
- 2018 UK Championship
- 2019 Scottish Open
- 2020 World Snooker Championship
- 2020 Championship League (ranking)
- 2020 Northern Ireland Open
- 2022 German Masters
- 2023 Scottish Open
- 2024 Championship League (ranking)
- 2024 English Open
- 2025 Tour Championship
- 2026 Players Championship
