= Cazoo =

Automotive classified advertising business

- Type: Private Company
- Industry: Automotive
- Founded: 2018; 8 years ago
- Founder: Alex Chesterman
- Headquarters: London, United Kingdom
- Area served: United Kingdom
- Key people: Barry Judge (CEO); Nick Moodie (CFO)
- Owner: o3 Industries and Novum Capital
- Number of employees: 250
- Website: cazoo.co.uk

Cazoo is a British automotive online marketplace and classified advertising business based in Richmond, London. Cazoo is owned by MOTORS, following its acquisition from Cazoo Holdings Limited by O3 Industries and Novum Capital.

== History ==
=== Cazoo Group ===
Cazoo was founded in 2018 by British internet entrepreneur Alex Chesterman. It launched an online marketplace for used cars in December 2019, which became its primary business. Chesterman announced the venture in December 2018 with seed funding of more than £30 million, raised from dmg ventures, the venture capital arm of the Daily Mail and General Trust, Stride.VC, Octopus Ventures and Entrée Capital. The company stated that customers would be able to buy, finance or rent a vehicle through the site and receive it at home within two days, with returns accepted during the first week after delivery. By the time retail trading began at the end of 2019, backing had reached about £80 million and the opening inventory consisted of 1,500 cars supplied by the remarketing group BCA.

In July 2020, Cazoo bought Imperial Car Supermarkets, an independent retailer founded in 2006 that operated 18 sites across the United Kingdom and listed over 2,500 nearly new and used vehicles alongside service and preparation facilities; the price was not disclosed. The sites gave the company a national network for storage, distribution, after-sales work, and customer collection, and were later reorganised so buyers could collect vehicles or have them delivered to their home. By November 2020 the company reported its 10,000th sale, revenue of more than £150 million in its first year of trading, a staff of over 800 and a valuation above £2 billion.

A further three purchases followed in quick succession. Drover, a car subscription service founded in 2016 by Felix Leuschner with more than 100 staff in London, Lisbon, Paris and Bucharest and over 2,000 active subscribers, was acquired on 25 January 2021 for £58.8 million, made up of £21.0 million in cash, £4.5 million of debt assumed and discharged and £33.3 million in shares and warrants. On 11 February 2021 the group paid £23.1 million for Smart Fleet Solutions Limited, which ran four vehicle refurbishment centres with over 500 staff and an expected capacity of around 200,000 cars a year, together with £15.9 million for freehold property used by those sites, reducing the company's reliance on outside contractors. Cluno GmbH, a Munich-based subscription service founded in 2017 with about 100 employees and more than 3,000 subscribers in Germany, was bought on 23 February 2021 for £60.4 million, of which £29.4 million was cash and £31.0 million shares; Munich was to serve as the company's European headquarters. Cazoo had intended to introduce a subscription offering of its own towards the end of 2021, and the acquisitions brought that forward.

Although based in the UK, Cazoo was listed on the New York Stock Exchange in August 2021 following a merger with a special-purpose acquisition company led by hedge fund manager Dan Och. As of its listing the company had a valuation of US$8 billion. It subsequently lost over 97% of its market value, causing Alex Chesterman to step down as CEO in January 2023.

The combination with AJAX I, a special-purpose acquisition company holding $805 million in trust that had been set up by Och with Glenn Fuhrman, was announced on 29 March 2021 and valued the enlarged business at a pro forma enterprise value of about $7.0 billion and a pro forma equity value of about $8.1 billion. Gross proceeds of $1,605 million were anticipated, combining the trust with a fully committed PIPE of $800 million priced at $10.00 per share, which was led by the AJAX sponsors and D1 Capital Partners and joined by Altimeter, funds managed by BlackRock, Counterpoint Global, Fidelity Management and Research, Marcho Partners, Mubadala Capital, Pelham Capital, Senator Investment Group and Spruce House Partnership; the sponsor team committed $200 million of that sum personally. After payments to existing holders, roughly $1.0 billion was to reach the company, whose then shareholders were to retain about 79% of the combined entity. The parties were to come together under a new holding company incorporated in the Cayman Islands, and completion was expected during the third quarter of 2021. Credit Suisse International and Goldman Sachs International advised Cazoo as lead financial advisers, with Numis also acting for the company and Freshfields Bruckhaus Deringer as legal counsel, while J.P. Morgan, PJT and Citigroup advised AJAX. The company had raised more than $550 million in venture funding before the transaction, and its choice of New York came a week after the electric vehicle manufacturer Arrival listed in the United States, a pairing read at the time as a setback for London's efforts to attract technology flotations.

In 2021 Cazoo had expanded internationally, launching used car marketplaces in Germany and France, and in early 2022 expanded briefly into Italy and Spain. Entry into those two markets followed a pair of purchases: Swipcar, a Barcelona-based subscription marketplace with a presence in Italy and Portugal, acquired in November 2021 for €30 million, and the Italian online retailer Brumbrum, bought for €80 million. Altogether the group committed close to €200 million to establishing itself in Spain, Germany and Italy, and signed multi-year sponsorship agreements with football clubs in each of those countries to build recognition of the brand.

After announcing redundancies in the UK in June 2022, in September, Cazoo announced it would abandon its business in the European Union, closing its operations in France, Germany, Italy and Spain and making all 750 of its EU employees redundant, leaving only its UK operation in business.

The withdrawal took different forms in different markets: the Italian and Spanish businesses were sold, while the French and German operations were largely wound down. By January 2023, that process was substantially complete, ending the company's attempt to build a pan-European online used car business.

UK redundancies were announced in March 2023 when 15 out of 22 showrooms were closed. A year later, in March 2024, the company stopped buying and selling cars and closed its remaining showrooms, aiming to become purely an online market place; the move meant 728 redundancies.

Results for 2022, published at the end of March 2023, showed revenue up 91% to £1.25 billion on 65,366 vehicles delivered, against a loss for the year of £704 million compared with £544 million in 2021; adjusted for exceptional and non-recurring items, the EBITDA loss was £254 million, against £168 million a year earlier. Retail gross profit per unit reached £596 in the fourth quarter, compared with £403 across the year as a whole. Withdrawal from the subscription market and the sale of the Cazana vehicle data business formed part of a programme intended to reduce annual costs by £200 million, and the refurbishment sites acquired with Smart Fleet Solutions, among them centres at Gloucester and Westbury, closed in March 2023. In February 2023, the company consolidated its share capital in an attempt to support its quoted price, and the following month Jonathan Dunkley, formerly chief executive of CarShop, was appointed chief operating officer. Sales guidance for 2023 was lowered to between 40,000 and 50,000 retail units, with the emphasis moved to margins rather than volume.

On 21 May 2024, Cazoo went into administration putting 208 remaining jobs at risk of redundancy. Cazoo's wholesale business was bought by G3; Constellation Automotive Group also acquired some Cazoo assets; and used-car platform Motors was reported in June 2024 to be buying Cazoo's brand and marketplace business.

The joint administrators were David Soden and Matthew Mawhinney of Teneo Financial Advisory, while the directors of the parent company, Cazoo Group Ltd, began placing it into voluntary liquidation, telling shareholders that no proceeds were expected to remain for them. The whole vehicle inventory had been sold and direct sales to the public ceased in April 2024; the company then missed an interest payment of roughly $5.3 million due on 15 May under its senior secured notes, and the New York Stock Exchange gave notice that it no longer met continued listing standards. A report lodged by the administrators with Companies House in July 2024 ascribed the collapse to rapid expansion, strong competition, high customer acquisition costs and adverse economic conditions, noting that outlay on marketing, sponsorship, logistics and reconditioning had exceeded the revenue generated. Unsecured creditors were owed slightly more than £259 million in total.

=== Under MOTORS ===
MOTORS announced the acquisition of Cazoo on 28 June 2024 and relaunched the Cazoo brand under a new app in July 2024. Cazoo's website was temporarily redirected to MOTORS while a new website on the company's backend was constructed.

On 2 April 2025, the Cazoo website was launched, and became the flagship brand within MOTORS' marketplace network. The relaunch followed the introduction of a Cazoo mobile app. As of 2 April 2025, Cazoo's mobile app had ratings of 4.8/5 on the Apple App Store and 4.6/5 on Google Play.

MOTORS repositioned Cazoo as a platform for dealers rather than a direct-to-consumer retailer, aiming to challenge Auto Trader’s dominance in the UK used car market. The brand retains its strong consumer recognition due to past investments in television, digital, and sports sponsorship advertising. MOTORS has committed to ongoing technology updates and marketing investment to enhance Cazoo’s reach and lead generation capabilities.

Alongside Cazoo, the MOTORS network included the original Motors site, eBay, Gumtree and Parkers; dealers holding multisite advertising packages were listed on Cazoo without additional charge during the launch period. The mobile application introduced in July 2024 had been downloaded more than 400,000 times by the time of the relaunch, according to the company. MOTORS itself has been owned by O3 Industries and Novum Capital since 2021, and by early 2026 the marketplace carried over 300,000 listings.

In April 2026, the company announced that the Motors advertising business would be renamed Cazoo on 27 May that year and that the older Motors website would be withdrawn by the end of 2026, consolidating activity onto a single marketplace through a phased migration intended to preserve traffic and dealer enquiry volumes. Listing arrangements for dealers were to be unaffected.

== Sponsorship ==
Cazoo sponsored the 2021 Rugby League World Cup, Welsh Rugby Union, a number of annual horse races in Epsom and Doncaster, cricket tournament The Hundred, various events managed by the World Snooker Tour, the Professional Darts Corporation, and the PGA European Tour.

Consequent on the company's announced retrenchment to the UK market in September 2022, Cazoo's sponsorships of European football clubs for the 2022–23 season, including Everton F.C., Aston Villa, Olympique de Marseille, SC Freiburg, Valencia CF, Lille OSC, Bologna FC and Real Sociedad were being wound down.

In 2025, following Motors' acquisition and relaunch of Cazoo as its flagship brand, the company expanded its involvement in football sponsorship through a new partnership with Brentford F.C.

Motors, which had partnered with Brentford since the start of the 2024–25 Premier League season, transitioned the sponsorship to promote the Cazoo brand. As part of this updated agreement, Cazoo became the lead sponsor for Brentford, delivering in-stadium activations, branded media placements, and player-led social media campaigns.
