= Fred Done =

British billionaire businessman

- Occupations: Founder & Chairman, Betfred
- Years active: 1967–current
- Organization: Betfred
- Relatives: Peter Done

Fred Done (born March 1943) is a British billionaire businessman and the owner of the bookmaking chain Betfred, which has more than 1,600 betting shops in the UK.

== Early life ==
Done grew up with three siblings in Ordsall, Greater Manchester. Done and his brother Peter Done left school aged 15 without qualifications after working in their father’s illegal bookmaking business.

== Career ==
In 1967 aged 24, Done opened his first bookmaker with his brother, which they funded by a win on England's victory in 1966 FIFA World Cup the year before.

By the mid-1980s, they had more than 70 bookmaking shops. In 1983, Done founded Peninsula Business Services, which has more than 10 companies operating in employment law, workplace health, and human resources.

In 1998, Done paid out early Manchester United to win the Premier League title, making him the first bookmaker to pay out early at the end of the season.

In 2004, Done's chain of bookmakers was renamed Betfred.

In 2015, Done announced he was in talks to sell a 25% stake in The Tote after buying it from the UK government for £265 million in 2011.

In 2018, Done made an investment in Adzooma, an online advertising platform based in Nottingham, UK.

In 2020, Done invested in GGRecon, an esports publisher based in Manchester, UK.

In 2021, Done stepped down as the chief executive of Betfred and took up the role of chairman.

According to the Sunday Times Rich List in May 2025, his and his family's net worth is £2.915 billion.

In February 2026, Fred Done was listed on the Sunday Times Tax list with an estimated £401.1 million.

=== Conflict of interest with Health Assured ===
In January 2020, Done and his brother came under public scrutiny after reports emerged that Health Assured, another company the two owned, was earning millions of pounds through government contracts to provide gambling addiction treatment for public sector workers. The arrangement prompted conflict of interest allegations from NHS chief Claire Murdoch and a number of MPs.

=== Property investments ===
In 2014, Done, along with Simon Ismail, established Salboy, a Manchester-based property development company. Since its founding, Salboy has developed a number of notable schemes, including Viadux, which will eventually contain the tallest building in Manchester at 245 meters. The company is also developing the St Michaels project alongside Gary Neville and his company Relentless, which is due to complete in 2027.

The construction wing of Salboy, Domis Construction Ltd is partially owned by Done's brother, Peter, and has worked on every Salboy project to date.
