= 2022 World Snooker Championship =

Professional snooker tournament

2022 Betfred World Snooker Championship

Tournament information
- Dates: 16 April – 2 May 2022
- Venue: Crucible Theatre
- City: Sheffield
- Country: England
- Organisation: World Snooker Tour
- Format: Ranking event
- Total prize fund: £2,395,000
- Winner's share: £500,000
- Highest break: Neil Robertson (AUS) (147); Graeme Dott (SCO) (147)

Final
- Champion: Ronnie O'Sullivan (ENG)
- Runner-up: Judd Trump (ENG)
- Score: 18–13

The 2022 World Snooker Championship (officially the 2022 Betfred World Snooker Championship) was a professional snooker tournament that took place from 16 April to 2 May 2022 at the Crucible Theatre in Sheffield, England, the 46th consecutive year the World Snooker Championship was held at the venue. The 16th and final ranking event of the 2021–22 snooker season, the tournament was organised by the World Snooker Tour and sponsored by sports betting company Betfred. It was broadcast in the United Kingdom by the BBC, in Europe (including the UK) by Eurosport, and elsewhere in the world by Matchroom Sport and other broadcasters. The total prize fund was £2,395,000, of which the winner received £500,000.

Qualifying rounds for the tournament took place from 4 to 13 April 2022 at the English Institute of Sport, featuring 128 professional and invited amateur players. The main stage of the tournament featured 32 players: the top 16 players from the snooker world rankings and another 16 players from the qualifying rounds. Ashley Hugill, Jackson Page, and Hossein Vafaei were debutants at the Crucible, Vafaei being the first Iranian player to reach the main stage. Mark Selby was the defending champion, having won the 2021 final 18–15 against Shaun Murphy. He lost 10–13 to Yan Bingtao in a second-round match that produced what was then the longest frame ever played at the Crucible, lasting 85 minutes.

Ronnie O'Sullivan equalled Steve Davis's record of 30 Crucible appearances. He reached a record 20th quarter-final and a record 13th semi-final before defeating Judd Trump 18–13 in the final to equal Stephen Hendry's modern era record of seven world titles. It was O'Sullivan's 39th ranking title and 21st Triple Crown title. Aged 46 years and 148 days, he became the oldest world champion in the sport's history, surpassing Ray Reardon, who was aged 45 years and 203 days when he won his last world title in 1978. O'Sullivan also broke Hendry's record of 70 wins at the Crucible, setting a new record of 74.

Neil Robertson made a maximum break in his second-round match against Jack Lisowski, the fifth of his career and the 12th time a 147 had been achieved at the Crucible. Graeme Dott also made a maximum break in his third-round qualifying match against Pang Junxu, the second of his career and the fifth time that a maximum had been made in the World Championship qualifiers. The main stage produced a record 109 century breaks, surpassing the 108 centuries made the previous year. Mark Williams made 16 centuries during the main stage, equalling the record set by Hendry in 2002.

== Background ==
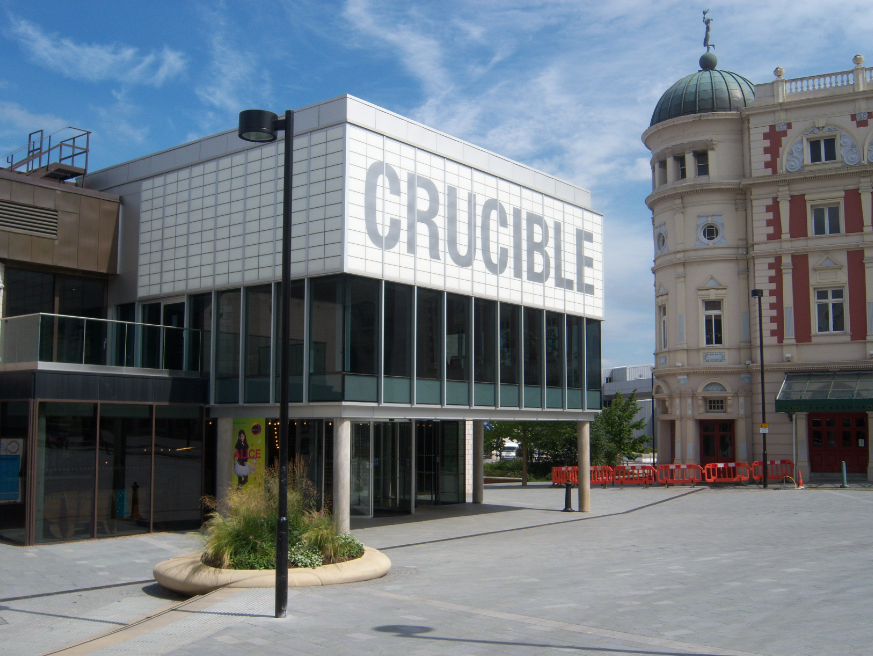
The main draw of the tournament is played at the Crucible Theatre in Sheffield, England.

The first World Snooker Championship final took place in 1927 at Camkin's Hall in Birmingham, England, and was won by Joe Davis. Since 1977 the tournament has been held annually at the Crucible Theatre in Sheffield, England. The 2022 event marked the 46th consecutive year that the tournament was held at the Crucible, and the 54th successive year that the World Championship was contested through the modern knockout format. Scottish player Stephen Hendry had been the most successful participant at the World Championship in the modern era, having won the title seven times. English player Mark Selby won his fourth world title at the 2021 championship, defeating compatriot Shaun Murphy 18–15 in the final, for which he received a £500,000 top prize from a total prize fund of £2,395,000. Organised by the World Snooker Tour, the 2022 tournament was sponsored by sports betting company Betfred, which sponsored the event from 2009 to 2012 and continuously since 2015.

=== Format ===
The 2022 World Snooker Championship took place from 16 April to 2 May 2022, as the last of 16 ranking events in the 2021–22 season. The event featured a 32-player main draw, preceded by a 128-player qualifying tournament that was held at the English Institute of Sport between 4 and 13 April 2022, finishing three days before the start of the main event. The qualifiers were played over four rounds, higher-ranked players being seeded and given byes to the later rounds. The first three qualifying rounds were played as the best of 11 frames, and the final round was played as the best of 19 frames.

The top 16 players in the latest snooker world rankings automatically qualified for the main draw as seeded players. Defending champion Selby was automatically seeded first overall. The remaining 15 seeds were allocated based on the latest world rankings, released after the 2022 Tour Championship. The 1991 champion John Parrott made the first-round draw for the Crucible on 14 April at Betfred Studios in Salford, drawing the qualifiers at random against the seeded players. Matches in the first round of the main draw were played as the best of 19 frames, second-round matches and quarter-finals played as the best of 25 frames, and the semi-finals as the best of 33 frames. The final was played over two days as a best-of-35-frames match.

Reaching the first round of the tournament's main stage were 12 players from England, six from Wales, four from Scotland, four from China, two from Thailand, and one each from Northern Ireland, Australia, Belgium, and Iran. It was the first time in the tournament's history that Iran was represented at the main stage. It was also the first time, since the tournament first featured 16 seeded players in 1980, that no seeded player from the United Kingdom was aged under 30. This occasioned debate about the increasing age profile of the UK's top players.

The tournament was broadcast in the United Kingdom on the BBC and Eurosport, and in Europe by Eurosport. Other international broadcasts were provided by Kuaishou, Migu, Huya Live, Youku, and CCTV in China; by NowTV in Hong Kong; and by DAZN in Canada, the United States, and Brazil. In territories where there was no other coverage, the event was broadcast by Matchroom Sport.

=== Prize fund ===
The winner of the event received £500,000 from a total prize fund of £2,395,000. The breakdown of prize money is shown below:

- Winner: £500,000
- Runner-up: £200,000
- Semi-finalists: £100,000
- Quarter-finalists: £50,000
- Last 16: £30,000
- Last 32: £20,000
- Last 48: £15,000
- Last 80: £10,000
- Last 112: £5,000
- Highest break (qualifying stage included): £15,000

A bonus of £40,000 was offered for a maximum break made at the Crucible, and £10,000 for a maximum made in the qualifying rounds. These bonuses were in addition to the £15,000 highest break prize.

== Summary ==
=== Qualifying ===
Seven-time champion Hendry, who had rejoined the professional tour in 2021 after nine years in retirement, chose not to enter the qualifiers for the 2022 tournament, stating that he had not been practising enough to be competitive. Liang Wenbo, seeded 32nd, would have entered the qualifiers in the third round but the World Professional Billiards and Snooker Association (WPBSA) suspended him from professional competition on 2 April after he was convicted on a domestic assault charge.

==== First qualification round ====
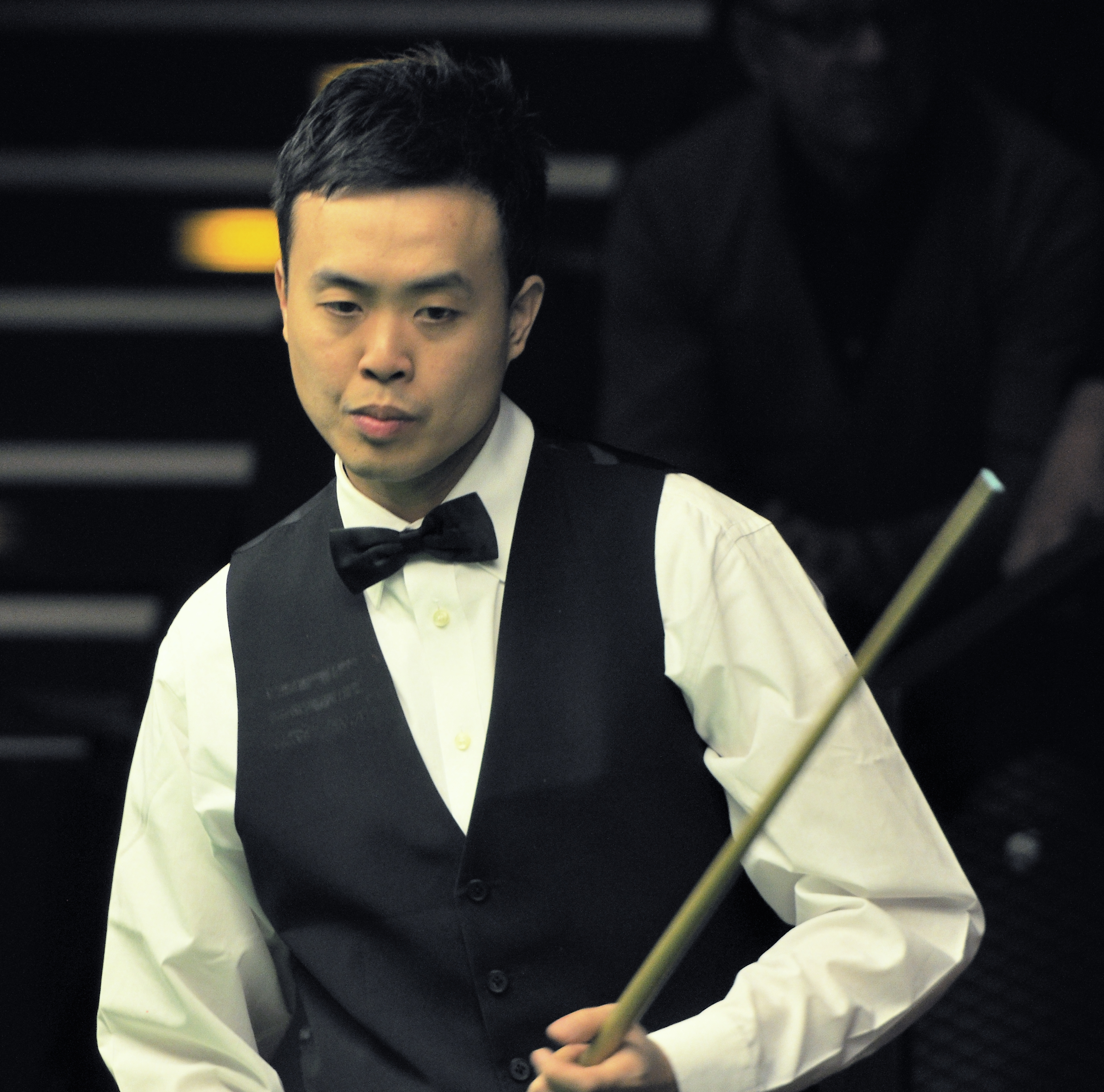
Marco Fu (pictured in 2014) played his first professional match in over two years in the first round of qualifying.

The first qualifying round featured players seeded from 81 to 112 against unseeded players. Aged 15 years and 277 days, Welsh amateur Liam Davies set a new record as the youngest winner of a World Championship match by defeating Aaron Hill 6–4. Jimmy White, runner-up on six occasions, lost 2–6 to Andrew Pagett, although Pagett was criticised after footage showed him not declaring a foul shot. Marco Fu, a semi-finalist in 2006 and 2016, had not competed professionally since the 2020 Welsh Open due to a combination of vision problems and COVID-19 travel restrictions. While preparing for his return, he made a rare break exceeding 147 in a practice match against Noppon Saengkham, compiling a 149. He lost 5–6 to Ian Burns, who made a 141 break in the match. Four female players – Reanne Evans, Rebecca Kenna, Ng On-yee, and Nutcharut Wongharuthai – competed in the qualifiers, but all four lost in the first round. Ukrainian teenager Iulian Boiko, who had become the youngest player ever to compete in qualifying as a 14-year-old in 2020, defeated Michael Georgiou 6–4 to win his first World Championship match.

==== Second qualification round ====
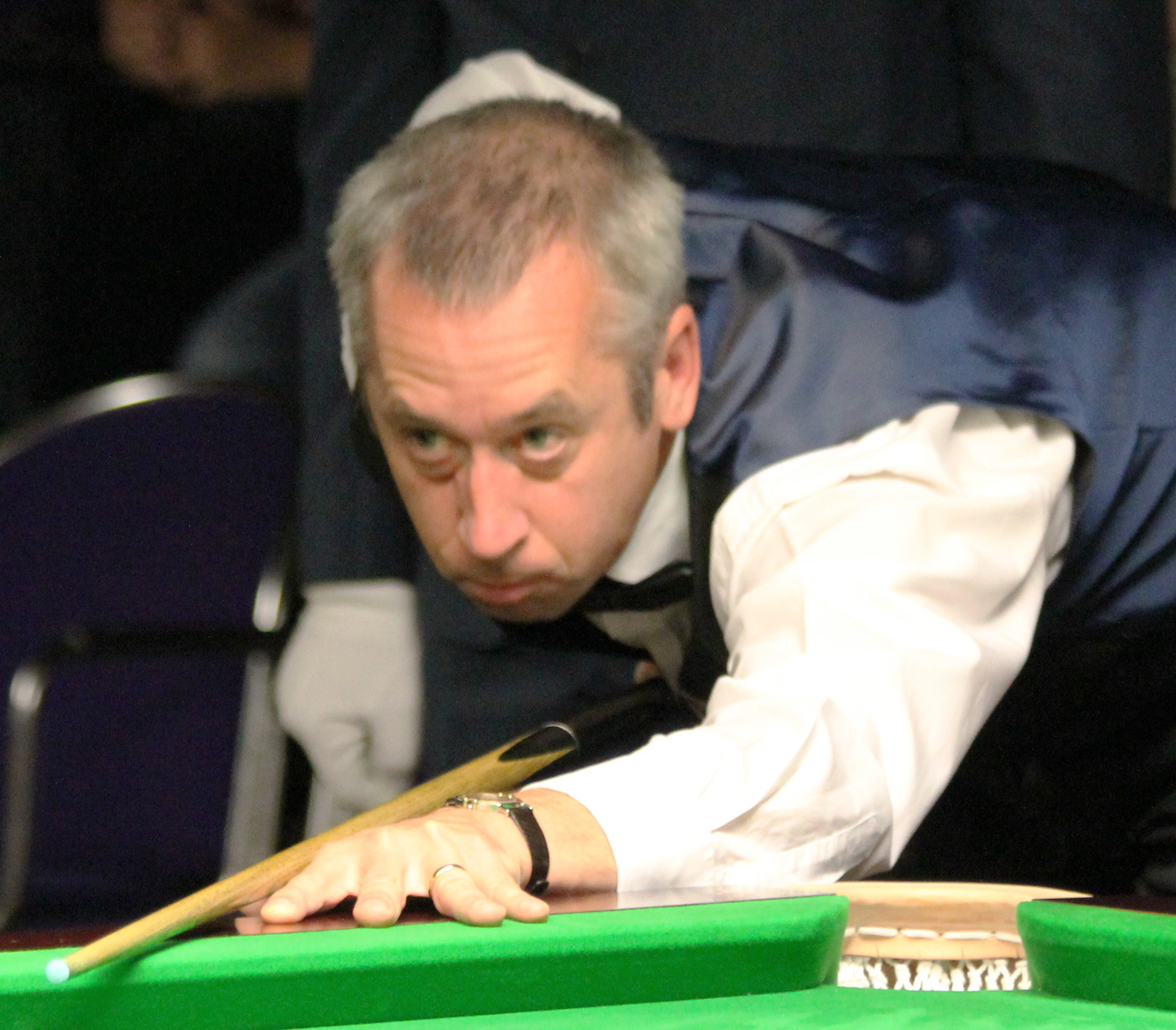
Nigel Bond (pictured in 2012), runner-up in 1995, announced his retirement from the professional tour after losing in the second qualifying round to Lukas Kleckers.

The second qualifying round featured players seeded from 49 to 80 against the first-round winners. Veteran player Dominic Dale defeated compatriot Duane Jones 6–3, a key win for Dale in his effort to stay on the professional tour. Allan Taylor defeated Michael Judge 6–5 on the final black ball, a victory that helped Taylor remain on the tour through the one-year rankings. Nigel Bond, the 1995 runner-up, lost his place on the tour after a 1–6 defeat to Lukas Kleckers. Bond, the last player who turned professional in the 1980s to remain on the tour without an invitational tour card, subsequently announced his retirement after 33 seasons, commenting: "At 56, my time as a main tour professional is at an end". Bond stated that he would not attempt to regain his professional status through playing in Q School events, but would still compete in the World Seniors Championship, continue coaching, and serve the remainder of his term as a WPBSA Players Board director.

Sunny Akani, Andrew Higginson, Fergal O'Brien and Martin O'Donnell all lost their tour cards after defeats. Thepchaiya Un-Nooh, also in danger of relegation from the tour, beat Pagett 6–4 in a match that saw Pagett make three centuries and Un-Nooh make a 137 break. Matthew Stevens, runner-up in 2000 and 2005, boosted his chances of remaining on the tour by beating Gerard Greene 6–1. The 1997 champion Ken Doherty lost 4–6 to Rory McLeod.

==== Third qualification round ====
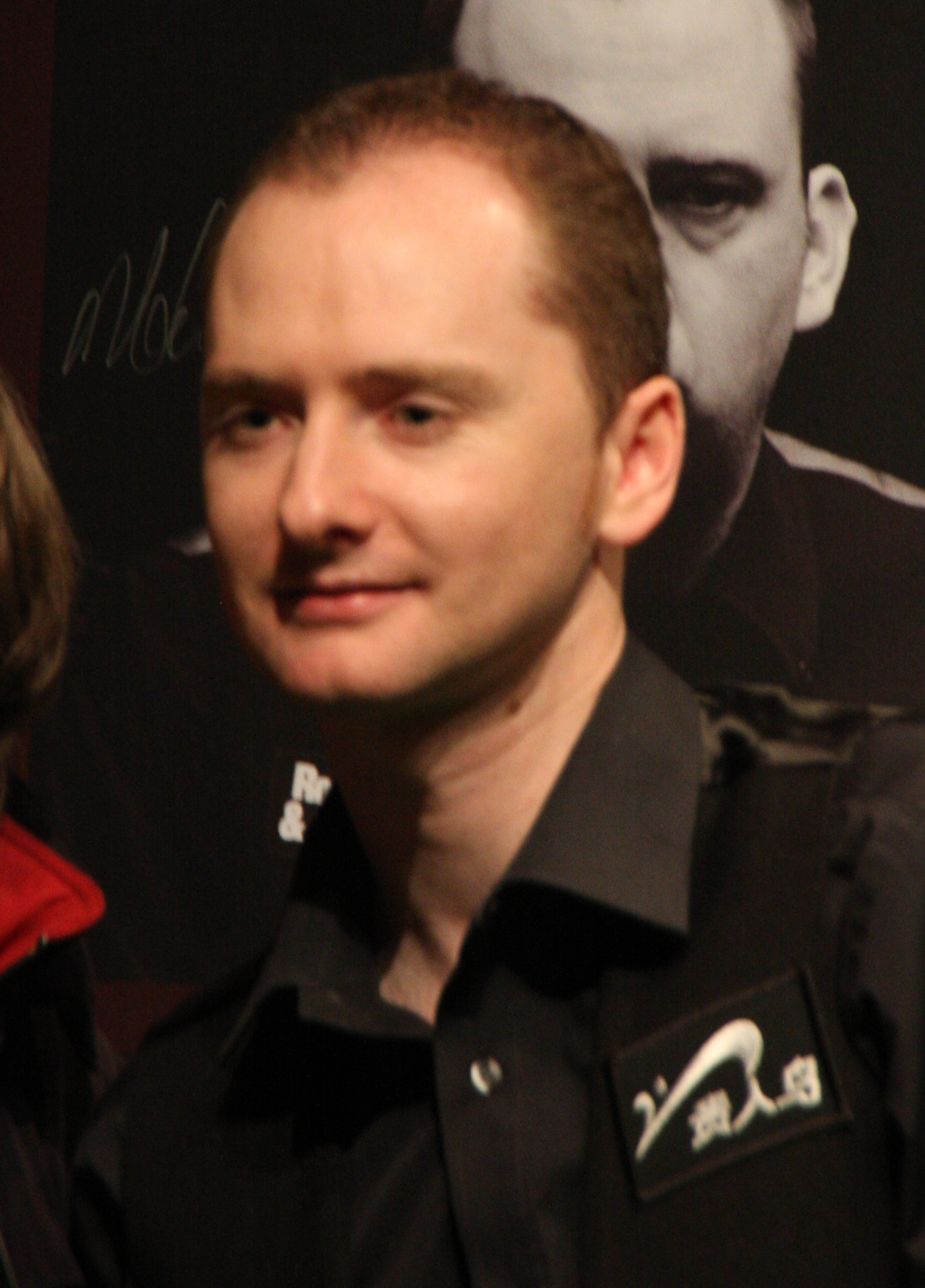
Graeme Dott (pictured in 2011) made a maximum break in his third-round match.

The third round of qualifying featured players seeded from 17 to 48 against the second-round winners. Five amateur players reached this stage: James Cahill, Liam Davies, David Lilley, Daniel Wells, and Michael White. Michael White defeated Mark King 6–1. Lilley, the reigning World Seniors Champion, defeated Kurt Maflin by the same score, which meant Maflin lost his place on the tour. The other amateurs did not progress. Dale received a walkover due to Liang's suspension, while Taylor achieved a surprise 6–4 win over 2013 semi-finalist and number 17 seed Ricky Walden, who had narrowly missed qualifying automatically for the Crucible after a semi-final loss in the Gibraltar Open. Scott Donaldson reached the last qualifying round by defeating Li Hang 6–5 on the final black ball, and Ashley Hugill came from 2–5 behind to defeat Martin Gould 6–5, despite suffering from food poisoning during the match.

Stephen Maguire, a semi-finalist in 2007 and 2012, played in the qualifiers for the first time since 2018 after falling to number 40 in the world rankings. He defeated Zhang Anda 6–3. Ding Junhui, the 2016 runner-up, played in the qualifiers after falling to 29th in the world rankings. He defeated his compatriot Tian Pengfei 6–4. David Gilbert, a 2019 semi-finalist, defeated McLeod 6–1, and Chris Wakelin defeated the European Masters champion Fan Zhengyi in a deciding frame. Kleckers lost his place on the tour after Matthew Selt beat him in a deciding frame; Michael Holt also lost his tour card following a 3–6 defeat to Tom Ford. Un-Nooh ensured that he would stay on the tour by defeating Jak Jones in a decider.

The 2006 champion Graeme Dott made a maximum break in the sixth frame of his 6–1 victory over Pang Junxu. His second maximum in professional competition, it came 23 years after his first at the 1999 British Open. It was the fifth time a maximum had been made in World Championship qualifying. Hossein Vafaei whitewashed Simon Lichtenberg 6–0 to reach the final qualifying round for the third time, and Jamie Clarke also secured a whitewash victory over 2019 semi-finalist Gary Wilson. The 2008 and 2012 runner-up Ali Carter defeated Gao Yang 6–4, and Stevens defeated Sam Craigie 6–1. The Welsh Open champion Joe Perry lost 3–6 to Jackson Page, who had regained his tour card through Q School after losing it the previous season.

==== Fourth qualification round ====
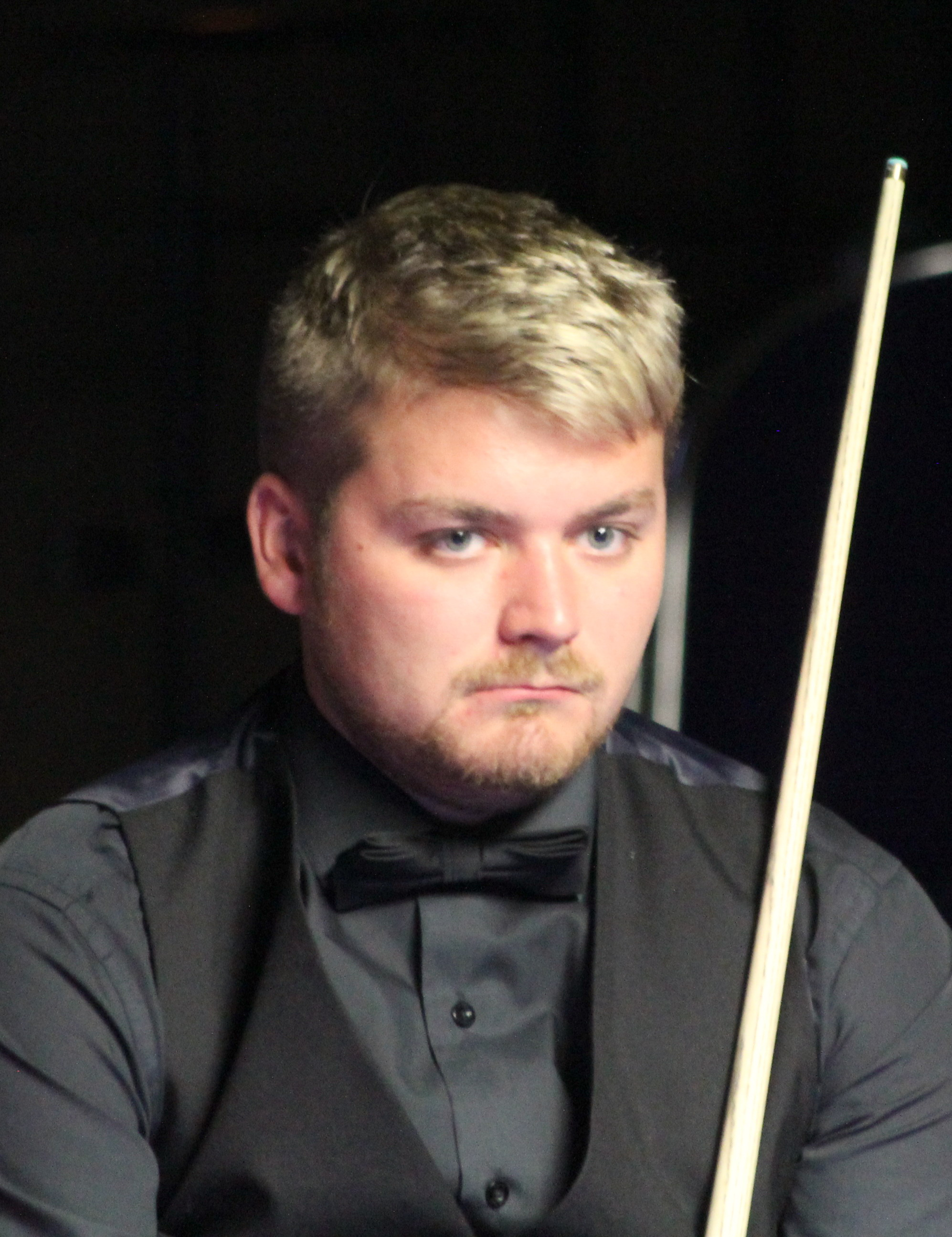
Michael White became the second amateur player to progress through qualifying for a World Championship, defeating Jordan Brown 10–8.

The fourth and final round of qualifying, billed as "Judgement Day", was played on 12 and 13 April and broadcast live on the World Snooker Tour's YouTube and Facebook channels. It comprised the 32 third-round winners facing each other in best-of-19-frame matches, all played over two sessions, with the 16 victors advancing to the main draw at the Crucible. Ding trailed Lilley 4–7 but won six frames in a row to reach the Crucible for a 16th consecutive year. Maguire reached the Crucible for a 19th consecutive time, defeating Zhou Yuelong 10–7 in a match he described as "a dog fight from start to finish". Hugill secured his Crucible debut by defeating Joe O'Connor 10–7, winning the final frame of the match by doubling the deciding black the length of the table. Michael White, who had previously reached the Crucible three times as a professional, came from 6–7 behind to defeat Jordan Brown 10–8. He became only the second amateur to qualify for the Crucible, after Cahill in 2019.

Un-Nooh trailed Selt 4–6, but won six of the last seven frames to secure a 10–7 victory, making back-to-back clearances of 138 and 145. Jamie Jones won the first seven frames against Ford and went on to clinch the match 10–5. Donaldson defeated Taylor 10–1, and Lyu Haotian defeated Dale 10–4 to reach the main draw for the third time. Vafaei took a 4–1 lead against Lei Peifan, but Lei levelled the scores at 5–5 and the match went to a deciding frame. Vafaei made a clearance from 61 points behind to win on the final black and become the first Iranian player to reach the final stages of a World Championship. Page also reached the Crucible for the first time with a 10–6 win over David Grace. Gilbert won seven straight frames for a 10–3 victory over Anthony Hamilton. Liam Highfield defeated Yuan Sijun 10–7 to reach the Crucible for a third time. Stevens lost the first four frames against Carter, but recovered to win 10–6 and reach the Crucible for an 18th time.

Clarke established an 8–4 lead over Dott, but the 2006 champion recovered to tie the scores at 8–8. In the 18th frame, Clarke got a fluke on the final black to clinch a 10–8 victory. Wakelin took four of the last five frames against Jimmy Robertson to secure a 10–7 win, and Saengkham won the last three frames against Gibraltar Open winner Robert Milkins for a 10–8 victory. Six Welsh players – qualifiers Clarke, Jones, Page, Stevens, and Michael White, along with top-16 seed Mark Williams – reached the Crucible, the most since 1990.

=== Main stage ===
==== First round ====
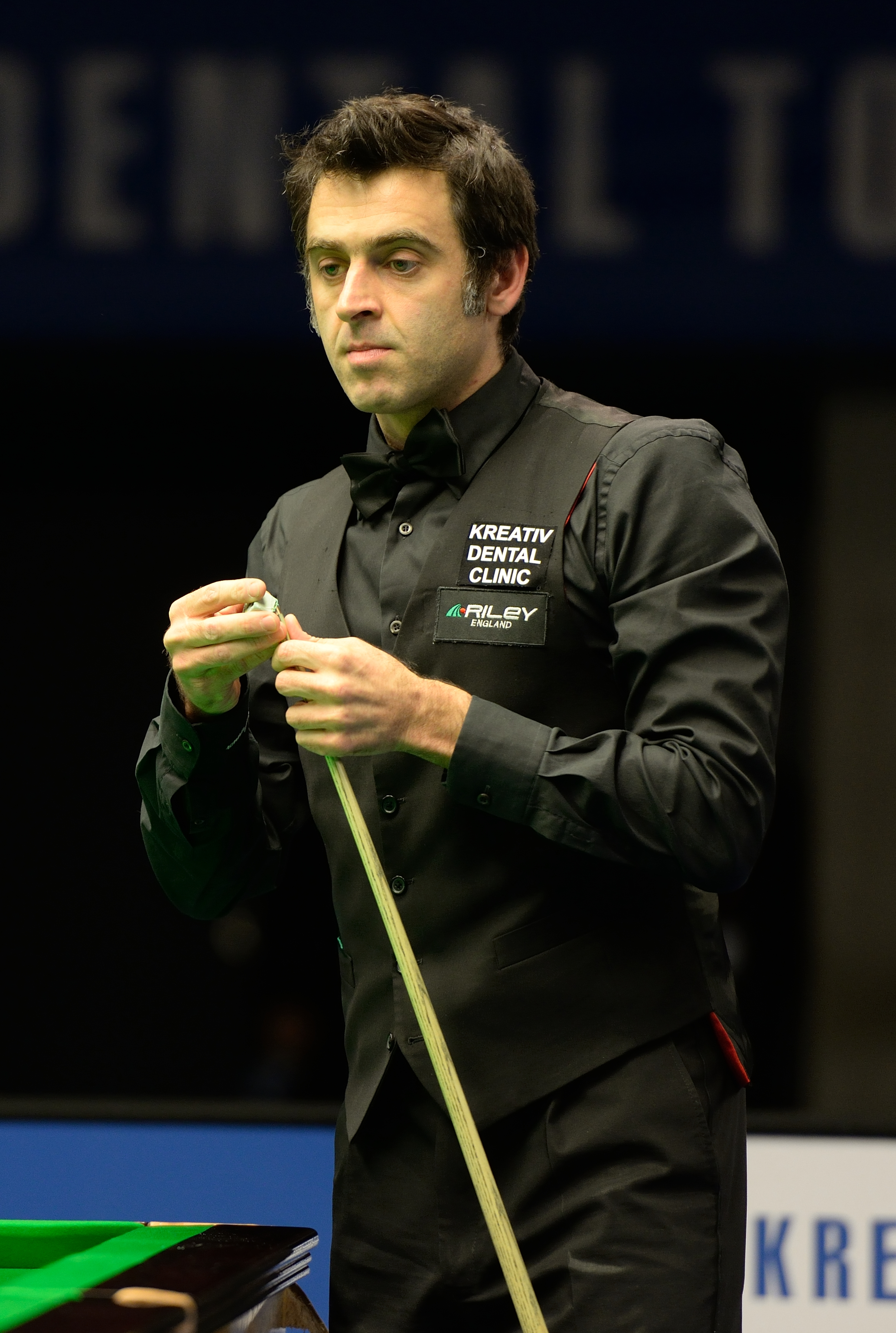
Ronnie O'Sullivan equalled the record for the most appearances at the event's main stage (30) set by Steve Davis.

The first round was played between 16 and 21 April as the best of 19 frames. Selby, who had withdrawn from the Turkish Masters and Gibraltar Open as he struggled with mental health issues, considered not defending his world title due to depression. He had not played competitively since his first-round loss at the Welsh Open, and practised relatively little before the tournament. He took an 8–3 lead over Jones but saw his lead reduced to two frames at 9–7. Selby clinched a 10–7 victory when Jones went in-off in frame 17. Ronnie O'Sullivan, the world number one, equalled Steve Davis's record 30 Crucible appearances, having competed in the final stages of the tournament every year since the age of 17. He lost the first three frames against Gilbert, but then won six in a row to lead 6–3 after the first session. O'Sullivan won four consecutive frames in the second session to clinch the match 10–5 and equal Hendry's record of 70 Crucible victories. He was referred to the WPBSA's disciplinary committee after appearing to make a lewd gesture when he missed a black off the spot in the 13th frame. O'Sullivan subsequently denied the charges at a disciplinary hearing, but was fined £2,000 and ordered to pay a further £2,000 in costs relating to gestures made during televised matchplay at the tournament and at the 2021 UK Championship.

Zhao Xintong, who had won the first two ranking titles of his career earlier in the season, made his second Crucible appearance. Facing Clarke, he took a 7–2 lead in the first session and won all three frames played in the second session as he wrapped up his first Crucible win 10–2. He made two centuries and five more breaks over 70 in the match. Afterwards, Clarke called Zhao "just phenomenal, a sensation in our sport" and predicted that he would win the title within five years. Page led former runner-up Barry Hawkins 6–2, but Hawkins narrowed his deficit to one frame at 7–8 before Page made back-to-back total clearances of 128 and 135 to win 10–7. "I couldn't have asked for a much better debut", commented Page. The first seeded player to exit the tournament, Hawkins failed to reach the second round for the first time since 2010.

Murphy and Maguire faced each other at the Crucible for the first time, Maguire establishing a 6–3 lead after the first session. Murphy began the second session with a 130 break, his 100th World Championship century, and reduced Maguire's lead to 7–6 at the mid-session interval. Commentating for the BBC, Doherty described the 14th frame as "one of the craziest" he had ever witnessed. Lasting 71 minutes, it included Maguire jokingly throwing his cue on the ground after losing position and Murphy discussing for four minutes the referee's decision to award him a free ball, before refusing to accept it out of sportsmanship. Murphy eventually won the frame on the black to tie the scores, and made a half-century in the 15th to lead for the first time at 8–7, but Maguire won the last three frames to clinch a 10–8 victory. Anthony McGill, a semi-finalist in 2020, led Highfield 6–3 after the first session. Highfield reduced his deficit to one frame at 6–7, but McGill took three of the last four to win 10–7, helped by a fluke in the final frame. McGill stated that he had struggled in the match, acknowledging "a lot of mistakes and missed pots", but credited his victory to his strong safety play.

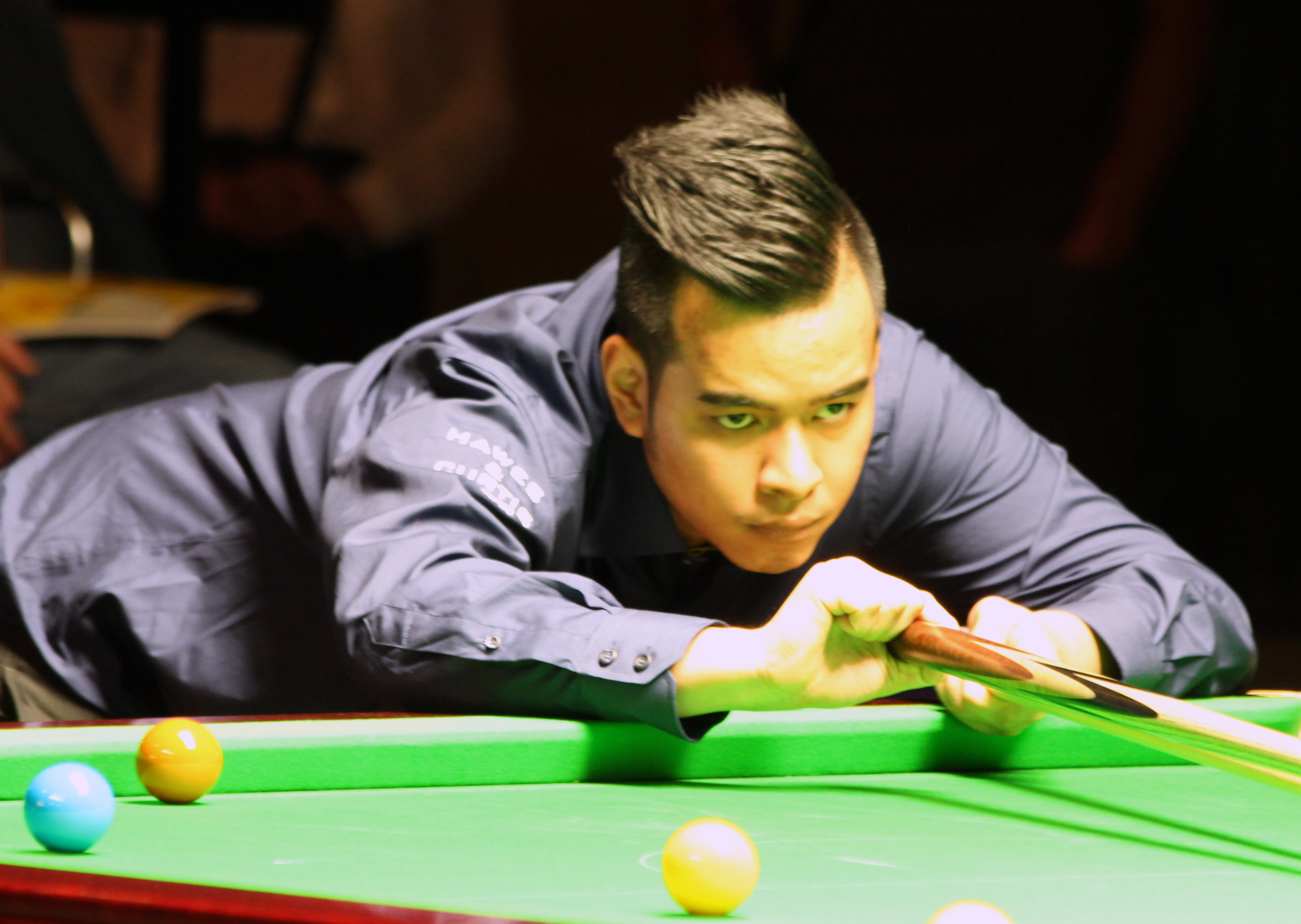
Noppon Saengkham's first-round match against Luca Brecel began the day after his first child was born.

Three-time champion Williams won the first seven frames against his compatriot Michael White, and wrapped up a 10–3 win in the second session, making four centuries in the match. "I started off like a train, put Michael under pressure and didn't really ease up", commented Williams. Mark Allen defeated Donaldson 10–6, but voiced his dissatisfaction with how the table had played. Neil Robertson trailed Hugill 1–3 but won eight consecutive frames on his way to a 10–5 victory, compiling four centuries in the match. Stuart Bingham, a semi-finalist the previous year, defeated Lyu 10–5 and made a 140 break in the match, the highest of the first round. Yan Bingtao, making his fourth Crucible appearance, compiled a century and seven half-centuries in his first session against Wakelin. He won five of the six frames played in the second session to clinch the match 10–6 and reach the second round for a third consecutive year. John Higgins made his 28th consecutive Crucible appearance. He trailed Un-Nooh 4–5 after the first session, but took six of the last eight frames to win 10–7 and reach the second round for an eighth consecutive time.

Jack Lisowski led Stevens 6–2, but Stevens recovered to tie the scores at 6–6. Lisowski won the next three frames to go 9–6 ahead and eventually won the match 10–8. Lisowski stated afterwards that he had been playing fearfully at the end because he was "guarding the lead, which is the worst thing you can do". The 2020 runner-up Kyren Wilson faced the 2016 runner-up Ding. Ding led 3–0 and 7–5, but Wilson went ahead at 8–7. Ding tied the scores at 8–8 but missed a pivotal pot on the final pink in the 17th frame as he attempted a clearance from 65 points behind. Wilson went on to win 10–8 and called the performance "one of my best victories". The match featured five centuries and 12 more breaks over 50. Before his match with Vafaei, 2019 champion Judd Trump stated that he had not been enjoying his snooker and did not have high expectations for the World Championship. The scores were tied at 3–3, but Trump won seven of the next eight frames for a 10–4 victory. Vafaei, who made a 121 break in the second session, called his Crucible debut "a very big achievement for me and my country". Luca Brecel faced Saengkham, whose wife had given birth to the couple's first child the day before the match began, three weeks earlier than expected. After winning six of the first seven frames, Saengkham went on to clinch a 10–5 victory and reach the second round for a second time. He revealed that he and his wife had named their newborn daughter Believe, stating that the name was inspired by Selby, who said "believe, believe, believe" while 4–10 down to Higgins in the 2017 final, before coming back to win the title.

==== Second round ====
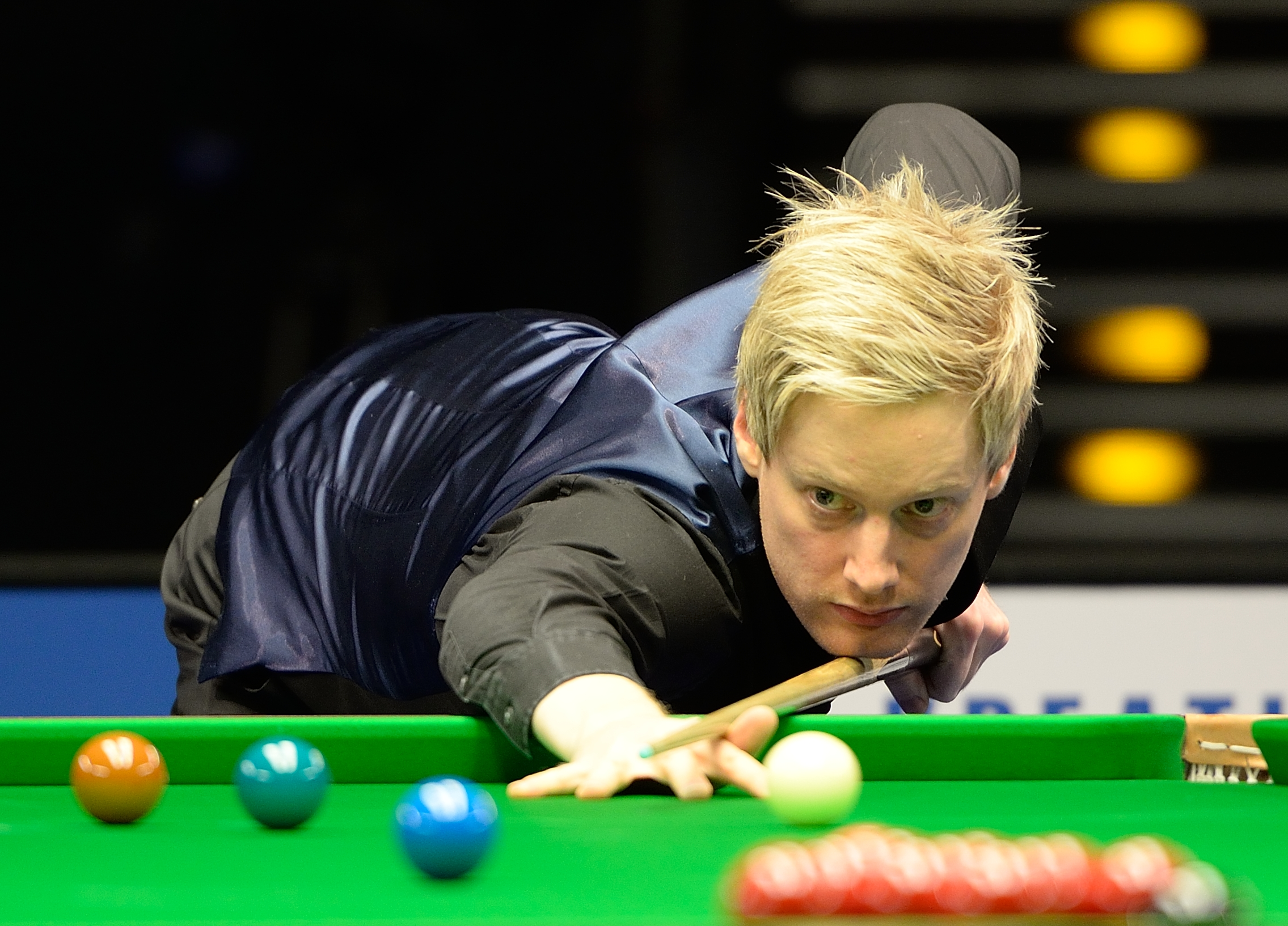
Neil Robertson made a maximum break in the second round.

The second round of the event was played as the best of 25 frames, held over three sessions, between 21 and 25 April. Thirteen of the top sixteen seeds reached the second round, along with three qualifiers, Page, Maguire, and Saengkham. Williams faced his practice partner Page, a player he described as "not just a friend, more like my fourth son". The players had met once previously in professional competition at the 2020 Scottish Open, Williams winning 4–1 on that occasion. Williams won the first seven frames, and went on to complete a 13–3 victory, winning the match with a session to spare and reaching the quarter-finals for an 11th time. He compiled six centuries in the match, equalling the record for the most centuries in a best-of-25-frame match set by Selby in the 2011 event.

Maguire faced Zhao, who played the first best-of-25-frame match of his professional career. Maguire took a 5–3 lead in the first session and extended it to 11–5 in the second session, which was briefly interrupted when a pigeon entered the arena and landed on the adjoining table where Yan was playing Selby. Maguire secured a 13–9 victory to reach the quarter-finals for a seventh time. Calling his form against Murphy "rubbish", he said that he had driven to Glasgow after his first-round match, borrowed a friend's cue, and practised with it to play Zhao. O'Sullivan faced Allen, who predicted that he would "get under the skin" of the world number one. O'Sullivan attempted a maximum break in the first frame but ran out of position after the tenth red and potted a pink, finishing on 87. O'Sullivan won five consecutive frames in the first session to lead 6–2. O'Sullivan attempted a maximum again in the second session, this time potting 11 reds and 11 blacks before losing position and missing a double on a red. He led 12–4 after the second session. The third session lasted just one frame as O'Sullivan wrapped up a 13–4 victory, setting records both for reaching a 20th quarter-final and for winning 71 matches at the Crucible.

Tied 4–4 with Selby after the first session, Yan took a 9–7 lead after the second session. In the third session, the 46-minute 18th frame hinged on a safety battle over the brown. Uncertain as to whether the cue ball would pass the blue to pot the brown, Yan studied the shot for several minutes before asking the referee to clean the cue ball, which referee Rob Spencer refused to do under the circumstances. Some commentators, including Jimmy White and Alan McManus, initially called Yan's request "out of order", but Yan later explained that it was a joke. Yan successfully made the shot to pot the brown and went on to win the frame for an 11–7 lead. Selby won the next three frames, reducing Yan's lead to one at 11–10. The penultimate frame of the match lasted 85 minutes, then a record for the longest frame ever played at the Crucible, surpassing the 79-minute frame played in a 2019 first-round match between Brecel and Gary Wilson. Yan won the frame on the final black, and went on to win the match 13–10. (The record for the longest frame at the Crucible was superseded four years later when Allen and Wu Yize played a 100-minute frame in the semi-finals of the 2026 edition.) Playing Bingham, Wilson attempted a maximum break in the second session, potting 12 reds and 12 blacks before missing the 13th red. Bingham made his own maximum break attempt in the third session, but ran out of position after the 13th red. Bingham, who won the match 13–9 to reach his fourth quarter-final, said it was on his "bucket list" to make a 147 at the Crucible.

Saengkham and Higgins were tied at 4–4 after the first session, but Higgins won seven consecutive frames in the second session to lead 11–5. In the third session, with Higgins one frame from victory at 12–6, Saengkham attempted a maximum break but missed the last red, ending on 112. "I'd have loved him to get it. You could see how fired up he was and I really thought he was going to do it", stated Higgins. Higgins won the match 13–7 to reach his 16th quarter-final, putting him ahead of Steve Davis and Jimmy White, who had both reached 15 quarter-finals, and behind only Hendry and O'Sullivan, who had reached 19 and 20 respectively. Trump led McGill 10–6 after the second session. McGill won four of the next five frames, narrowing Trump's lead to one at 11–10. Trump won the next to move one frame from victory, but McGill closed the scores to 12–11, and was 30 points ahead in frame 24 when he missed a shot on a red with the rest. Trump won 13–11 to reach his ninth quarter-final; he called the final session of the match "one of the best sessions I have been involved in".

Lisowski led Robertson 9–7 after the first two sessions. In the 19th frame, Robertson made a maximum break, the fifth of his career and the 12th maximum in Crucible history. He became the eighth player, after Cliff Thorburn, Jimmy White, Hendry, O'Sullivan, Williams, Carter, and John Higgins, to make a maximum in the final stages of a World Championship. Robertson went 12–11 ahead and looked to be on the verge of victory when he made a 55 break in frame 24, but Lisowski produced a frame-winning clearance of 72 to force a decider. Both players had opportunities to win before Lisowski clinched the frame for a 13–12 victory. Lisowski said afterwards: "I have never experienced anything like that in my life. The cheer when I potted the red that got me over the line in the decider... I am completely drained, I gave that literally everything I had and it has to be the best win of my career."

==== Quarter-finals ====
The quarter-finals of the event were played as the best of 25 frames, held over three sessions, on 26 and 27 April. Maguire was the only qualifier to reach this stage; Yan and Lisowski both competed in the quarter-finals for the first time. O'Sullivan, Higgins, and Williams, collectively known as the Class of '92 having all turned professional in 1992, all reached the quarter-finals for the first time since 2011. "I think it's incredible that it's been 30 years and the three of us are better players than we've ever been", Higgins stated.

Facing Maguire, O'Sullivan won six consecutive frames in the first session to lead 6–2. He won another five consecutive frames in the second session, ending it with an 11–5 lead. O'Sullivan wrapped up a 13–5 victory within 20 minutes of the final session to reach a record 13th semi-final, breaking Hendry's previous record of 12. In his first session against Yan, Williams won four frames in a row after the mid-session interval to finish 6–2 ahead. Yan won six of the eight frames played in the second session, levelling the scores at 8–8. In the final session, Yan took a 10–8 lead, but Williams tied the scores at 10–10. Yan took advantage of several flukes to go 11–10 ahead, but Williams won the last three frames to clinch the match 13–11 and reach his seventh semi-final, becoming the oldest player to reach the final four since Ray Reardon in 1985. He stated afterwards: "I am just so happy to get to the semi-finals. I am here 30 years on after turning pro and still trying my best ... I am scoring as well as I have ever scored."

Higgins led Lisowski 5–3 after the first session and 8–7 after the second. Higgins moved into an 11–9 lead in the final session, but Lisowski won three frames in a row to lead 12–11 before Higgins made a century break to force a deciding frame. Lisowski had the first chance in the decider but missed a red while on a break of 18. Higgins clinched victory with a 72 break, winning 13–12. Afterwards, Higgins said he was delighted to reach the semi-finals but did not think he deserved the win. Trump led Bingham 5–3 after the first session. Bingham won five consecutive frames in the second session to lead 8–5, before Trump recovered to tie the scores at 8–8. Trump took all five frames played in the final session to clinch a 13–8 victory. Trump noted the 14th frame as a turning point in the match: "All of sudden, out of nowhere, Stuart missed a black off its spot and it gave me some confidence. I was completely gone at 8–5. I just tried to enjoy it and give my all."

==== Semi-finals ====
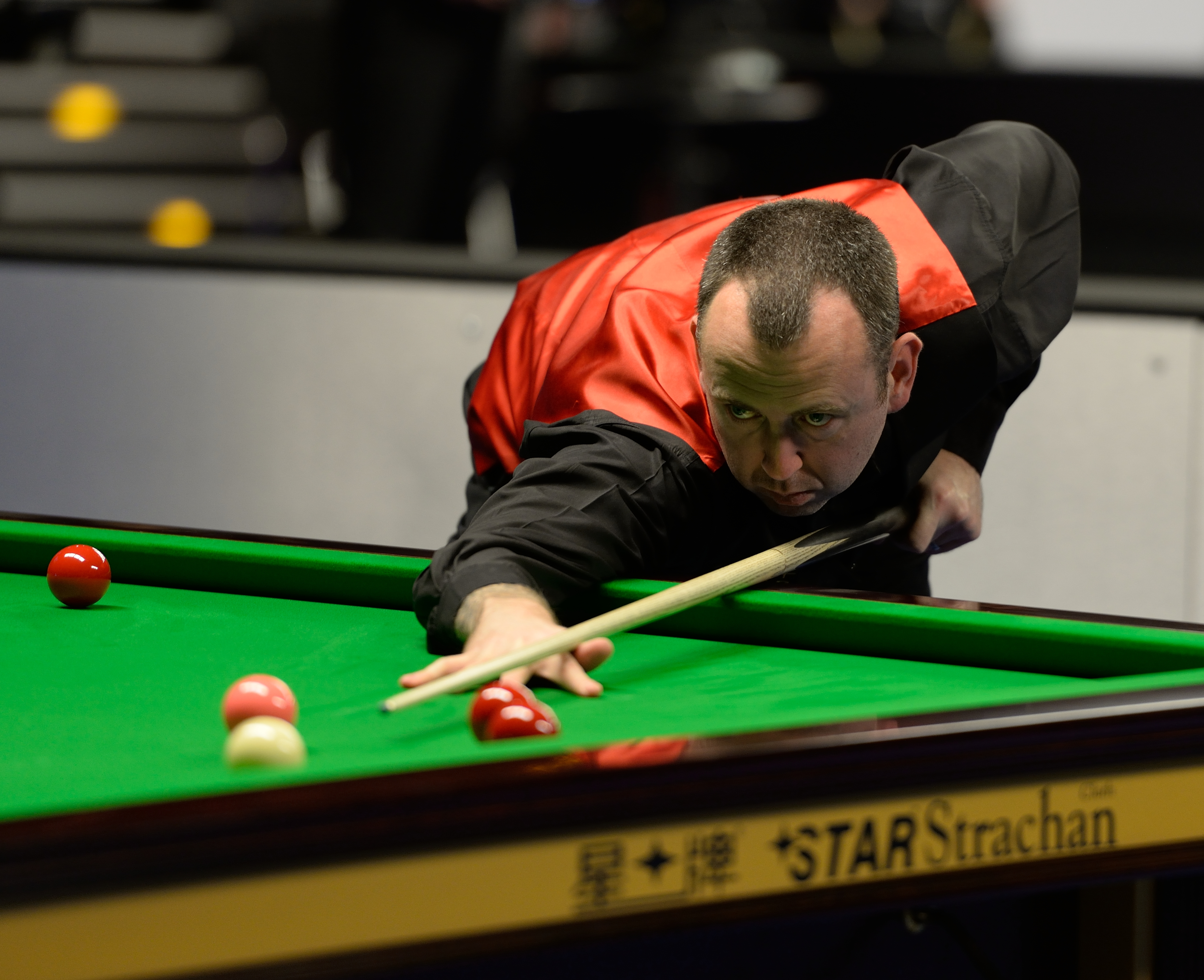
Mark Williams came from 2–9 behind against Judd Trump to lead 16–15, but lost the semi-final 16–17.

The semi-finals of the event were played as the best of 33 frames, held over four sessions, between 28 and 30 April. For the first time at the Crucible, all four semi-finalists were former champions, O'Sullivan having won six previous titles, Higgins four, Williams three, and Trump one. All three members of the Class of '92 reached the semi-final stage for the first time since the 1999 event.

Trump and Williams played each other for the first time in a Triple Crown tournament. Williams made errors throughout the first session and struggled with his long potting, as Trump won seven of the eight frames played to lead 7–1. Both players complained about the condition of the table, which was repaired during the interval. Steve Davis noted the contrast with Williams's strong performances in earlier rounds, saying: "It is a shock that Mark Williams has gone off the boil. We expected him to continue his form." Afterwards, Williams apologised on Twitter for his poor play in the session. In the second session, Trump made back-to-back centuries to take a seven-frame lead at 9–2, but Williams responded with a 119 break to make his 13th century of the tournament, a new personal best in any tournament of his career. Both players won four frames in the session to leave Trump leading 11–5. Williams won six of the eight frames in the third session, reducing Trump's lead to 13–11 and receiving a standing ovation as he left the arena. Doherty commented: "What a performance. The match between Judd Trump and Mark Williams is back on."

In the final session, Williams levelled the scores at 13–13 and 15–15. His 138 break in the 30th frame was his 16th century of the tournament, equalling Hendry's 2002 record for the highest number of centuries in a single year at the Crucible. Williams went ahead for the first time at 16–15, but Trump took the match to a deciding frame, before which the players received a standing ovation. Both players had chances to win, but Trump potted two of the last three reds with cross doubles and then took the final red with a black to win the frame and match. Trump commented that the win was "once in a lifetime", and that playing Williams was akin to playing a video game on "hard mode". The media praised the drama and quality of the match, calling it a "thrilling Crucible clash" and "one of the great matches in Crucible history". At the end of the year, the World Snooker Tour ranked the semi-final between Trump and Williams in second place on its "Top Ten Matches of 2022" list.

O'Sullivan and Higgins met at the Crucible for a sixth time. Before the semi-final, O'Sullivan led their head-to-head 36–33, but Higgins had won five of their last six encounters. They had last met at the Crucible in the quarter-finals of the 2011 event, when Higgins won 13–10 en route to his fourth title. Both players struggled to find fluency at the outset, with O'Sullivan's average shot time exceeding 29 seconds in the first two frames. Higgins won the first three frames, but O'Sullivan levelled the scores at 4–4 after the first session. The scores were level again at 6–6 in the second session, but O'Sullivan then moved 9–6 ahead. In the final frame of the session, O'Sullivan was 51 points behind with 51 remaining on the table. After potting a red and black, he made a 43 clearance to force a re-spotted black, which he potted to take a 10–6 lead.

O'Sullivan won five of the eight frames played in the third session, ending with a total clearance of 134, to extend his lead to 15–9. Higgins, whose 103 in the 21st frame was his only break over 70 in the match, slammed the butt of his cue on the floor in frustration after missing a red in the 23rd frame. The final session lasted four frames as O'Sullivan wrapped up a 17–11 win. Higgins stated afterwards that he was disappointed with how he had played, but praised his opponent: "Ronnie was far too good for me. He was lethal. I don't think he missed one ball when he was in among them, he might have run out of position a few times, but other than that he was unbelievable."

==== Final ====
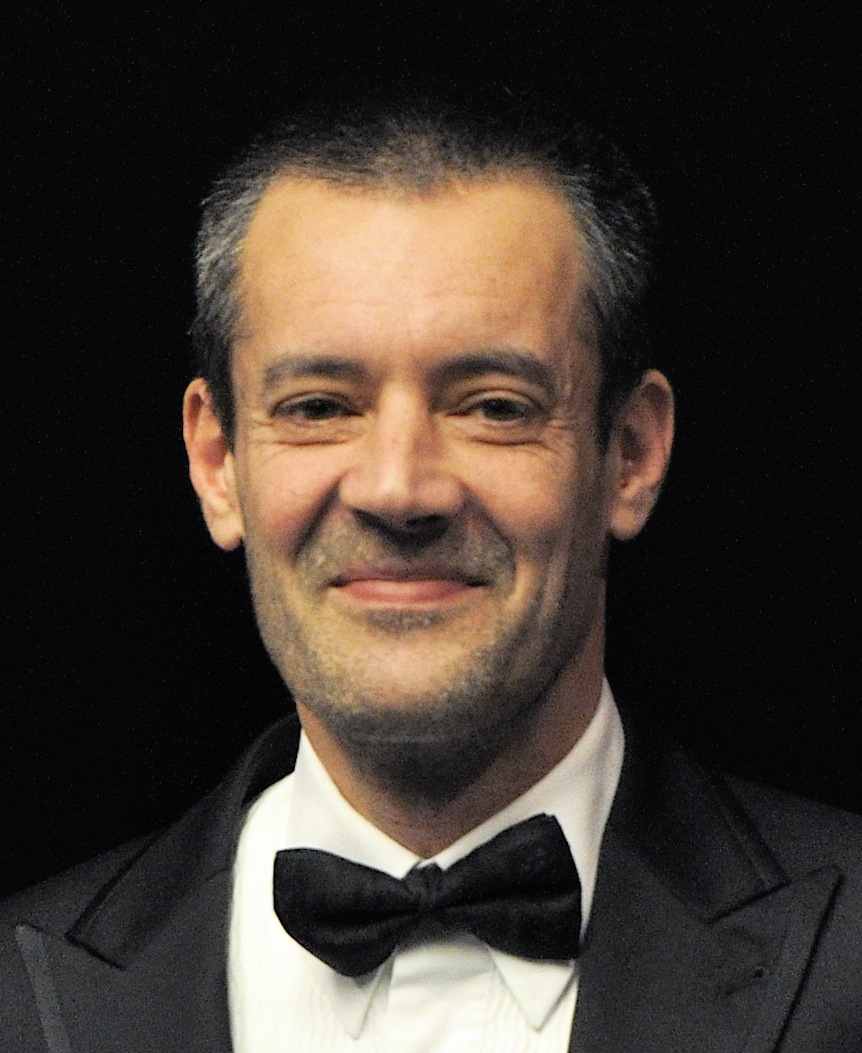
Olivier Marteel (pictured in 2013) officiated over his second World Championship final.

The final of the event was played on 1 and 2 May 2022 as a best-of-35-frames match, held over four sessions, between O'Sullivan and Trump. Belgian referee Olivier Marteel took charge of his second World Championship final, having previously refereed the 2015 final between Bingham and Murphy. O'Sullivan was contesting his eighth World Championship final, having won six and lost one previously, and Trump was competing in his third final, having won one and lost one previously. The finalists had met once before at the Crucible, in the semi-finals of the 2013 event, when O'Sullivan defeated Trump 17–11. Trump stated before the match: "It's always been a dream of mine to play Ronnie in the final."

After Trump won the opening frame, O'Sullivan won the second with a 120 break, his 13th century of the tournament, equalling his previous personal best at the Crucible. In the fourth frame, O'Sullivan engaged in a three-minute discussion with the referee about the correct replacement of the cue ball after a miss had been called. O'Sullivan came from behind in the frame to force a re-spotted black, which he potted with a double off three cushions to lead 3–1. O'Sullivan went on to lead 5–1, making another century in the sixth frame. Trump won the last two frames of the session, reducing O'Sullivan's lead to 5–3. O'Sullivan and referee Marteel had several heated exchanges during the session and did not shake hands afterwards. Marteel issued a formal warning over a gesture O'Sullivan made near the end of the eighth frame after failing to escape from a snooker, but O'Sullivan denied any wrongdoing, later accusing the referee of "looking for trouble". Trump won the first frame of the second session, but O'Sullivan took seven of the next eight, capitalising on safety errors and missed pots by Trump to end 12–5 ahead, his largest overnight lead in any of the world finals he had played. O'Sullivan's 118 break in the 11th frame was his 15th century of the tournament, a new personal best in a single year at the Crucible. Speaking critically for the BBC, Murphy stated that Trump had "made far too many mistakes" and had "a horrific night in front of him" after the first day's play.

Trump began the third session with his first century of the match, and went on to win six of the eight frames played, reducing O'Sullivan's lead to three at 14–11. It was the only session O'Sullivan lost in the tournament. In the final session, O'Sullivan won three of the first four frames with breaks of 82, 88, and 75 to go 17–12 ahead at the mid-session interval. Trump made a century to win the 30th frame, bringing the total number of Crucible centuries to 109, breaking the record of 108 achieved the previous year. However, O'Sullivan made an 85 in the 31st to win the match 18–13 and equal Hendry's record of seven world titles. Calling it "probably the best result I've ever had", O'Sullivan said the final had been "a titanic battle against a strong competitor who is young and hungry". Trump said he had "made a fight of it against the best player of all time" and called O'Sullivan's seventh world title "an amazing achievement for him and for snooker". The victory gave O'Sullivan his 39th ranking title and 21st Triple Crown title. Aged 46 years and 148 days, he became the oldest world champion in snooker history, surpassing Reardon, who was 45 years and 203 days old when he won his final title in 1978. O'Sullivan also set a new record for the most matches won at the Crucible, with 74, and ended the season as world number one. Writing for Snooker Scene, editor Clive Everton praised these achievements by O'Sullivan, calling him "snooker's answer to Tiger Woods in golf or Roger Federer in tennis".

The last session of the final attracted a peak audience of 4.5 million viewers on BBC Two, the highest figure since 2014 and a 17 per cent increase over the previous year. Overall, the event attracted a 30 per cent greater share of the BBC's viewing audience than the previous year. The event was Eurosport's best tournament on record in the UK, in terms of both average audience and market share. Eurosport also achieved record viewership figures in France, Germany, Italy, Poland, and Spain for the event.

== Main draw ==
The numbers given in brackets after the players' names show their 2022 World Championship seedings. The sole amateur player in the championship is indicated with (a). The match winners are denoted in bold text.

**First round** Best of 19 frames
16 April
**Mark Selby** (ENG) (1)	**10**
Jamie Jones (WAL)	7
19 April
**Yan Bingtao** (CHN) (16)	**10**
Chris Wakelin (ENG)	6
16 & 17 April
Barry Hawkins (ENG) (9)	7
**Jackson Page** (WAL)	**10**
17 & 18 April
**Mark Williams** (WAL) (8)	**10**
Michael White (WAL) (a)	3
20 April
**Kyren Wilson** (ENG) (5)	**10**
Ding Junhui (CHN)	8
18 & 19 April
**Stuart Bingham** (ENG) (12)	**10**
Lyu Haotian (CHN)	5
17 & 18 April
**Anthony McGill** (SCO) (13)	**10**
Liam Highfield (ENG)	7
20 & 21 April
**Judd Trump** (ENG) (4)	**10**
Hossein Vafaei (IRN)	4
18 & 19 April
**Neil Robertson** (AUS) (3)	**10**
Ashley Hugill (ENG)	5
19 & 20 April
**Jack Lisowski** (ENG) (14)	**10**
Matthew Stevens (WAL)	8
20 & 21 April
Luca Brecel (BEL) (11)	5
**Noppon Saengkham** (THA)	**10**
19 & 20 April
**John Higgins** (SCO) (6)	**10**
Thepchaiya Un-Nooh (THA)	7
16 & 17 April
**Zhao Xintong** (CHN) (7)	**10**
Jamie Clarke (WAL)	2
16 & 17 April
Shaun Murphy (ENG) (10)	8
**Stephen Maguire** (SCO)	**10**
18 April
**Mark Allen** (NIR) (15)	**10**
Scott Donaldson (SCO)	6
16 & 17 April
**Ronnie O'Sullivan** (ENG) (2)	**10**
David Gilbert (ENG)	5

**Second round** Best of 25 frames
22 & 23 April
(England) Mark Selby (1)	10
(China) **Yan Bingtao** (16)	**13**
21 & 22 April
(Wales) Jackson Page	3
(Wales) **Mark Williams** (8)	**13**
24 & 25 April
(England) Kyren Wilson (5)	9
(England) **Stuart Bingham** (12)	**13**
23, 24 & 25 April
(Scotland) Anthony McGill (13)	11
(England) **Judd Trump** (4)	**13**
23, 24 & 25 April
(Australia) Neil Robertson (3)	12
(England) **Jack Lisowski** (14)	**13**
24 & 25 April
(Thailand) Noppon Saengkham	7
(Scotland) **John Higgins** (6)	**13**
21, 22 & 23 April
(China) Zhao Xintong (7)	9
(Scotland) **Stephen Maguire**	**13**
22 & 23 April
(Northern Ireland) Mark Allen (15)	4
(England) **Ronnie O'Sullivan** (2)	**13**

**Quarter-finals**; Best of 25 frames
26 & 27 April
(China) Yan Bingtao (16)	11
(Wales) **Mark Williams** (8)	**13**
26 & 27 April
(England) Stuart Bingham (12)	8
(England) **Judd Trump** (4)	**13**
26 & 27 April
(England) Jack Lisowski (14)	12
(Scotland) **John Higgins** (6)	**13**
26 & 27 April
(Scotland) Stephen Maguire	5
(England) **Ronnie O'Sullivan** (2)	**13**

**Semi-finals**; Best of 33 frames
28, 29 & 30 April
(Wales) Mark Williams (8)	16
(England) **Judd Trump** (4)	**17**
28, 29 & 30 April
(Scotland) John Higgins (6)	11
(England) **Ronnie O'Sullivan** (2)	**17**

**Final**; Best of 35 frames
1 & 2 May
(England) Judd Trump (4)	13
(England) **Ronnie O'Sullivan** (2)	**18**

Final: (Best of 35 frames) Crucible Theatre, Sheffield, 1 & 2 May 2022; Referee: Olivier Marteel
Judd Trump (4); England				13–**18**			**Ronnie O'Sullivan** (2); England			
Session 1: 3–**5**
Frame	1	2	3	4	5	6	7	8	9	10
Trump	**98**† (72)	0	1	66 (52)	13	4	**98**† (97)	**79**†	N/A	N/A
O'Sullivan	0	**120**† (120)	**78**† (68)	**73**†	**62**†	**105**† (105)	0	50	N/A	N/A
Session 2: 2–**7** (5–**12**)
Frame	1	2	3	4	5	6	7	8	9	10
Trump	**100**† (73)	7	9	15	0	26	**80**† (80)	0	33	N/A
O'Sullivan	36	**117**† (66, 50)	**122**† (118)	**107**† (97)	**77**†	**94**† (87)	4	**79**† (60)	**88**† (88)	N/A
Session 3: **6**–2 (11–**14**)
Frame	1	2	3	4	5	6	7	8	9	10
Trump	**115**† (107)	**90**† (59)	**81**†	45	**66**†	**60**†	1	**126**† (105)	N/A	N/A
O'Sullivan	22	25	0	**71**† (64)	20	51	**68**† (55)	0	N/A	N/A
Session 4: 2–**4** (13–**18**)
Frame	1	2	3	4	5	6	7	8	9	10
Trump	12	12	**72**† (64)	1	**151**† (109)	0	N/A	N/A	N/A	N/A
O'Sullivan	**82**† (82)	**88**† (88)	27	**91**† (75)	0	**93**† (85)	N/A	N/A	N/A	N/A
109				Highest break			**120**			
3				Century breaks			3			
10				50+ breaks			**16**			
(England) **Ronnie O'Sullivan** wins the 2022 Betfred World Snooker Championship † = Winner of frame

== Qualifying draw ==
The results from the qualifying rounds are shown below. The numbers given before the players' names show their World Championship seedings, and "a" indicates a player's amateur status at the time of the draw. The match winners are denoted in bold text. The WPBSA selected 16 amateur players to participate in the qualifying rounds, along with the 106 professionals outside the top 16 of the world rankings and the top six from the 2021 Q School Order of Merit.

**Round 1 (Last 144)**; Best of 11 frames
81	Zhao Jianbo (CHN)	4
**Michael Judge** (IRL)	**6**
112	Alfie Burden (ENG)	4
a	**Robbie McGuigan** (NIR)	**6**
96	**Duane Jones** (WAL)	**6**
a	Nutcharut Wongharuthai (THA)	2
97	**Xu Si** (CHN)	**6**
a	Michael Collumb (SCO)	4
104	**Zhang Jiankang** (CHN)	**6**
a	John Astley (ENG)	4
89	**Zhang Anda** (CHN)	**6**
a	Anton Kazakov (UKR)	0
105	Fraser Patrick (SCO)	1
a	**Michael White** (WAL)	**6**
88	Aaron Hill (IRL)	4
a	**Liam Davies** (WAL)	**6**
85	**Lukas Kleckers** (GER)	**6**
a	Soheil Vahedi (IRN)	3
108	**Andrew Pagett** (WAL)	**6**
Jimmy White (ENG)	2
92	**Hammad Miah** (ENG)	**6**
Chen Zifan (CHN)	3
101	**Louis Heathcote** (ENG)	**6**
a	Ben Mertens (BEL)	5
100	Craig Steadman (ENG)	4
a	**David Lilley** (ENG)	**6**
93	**Lee Walker** (WAL)	**6**
Reanne Evans (ENG)	2
109	**Barry Pinches** (ENG)	**6**
a	Lee Stephens (ENG)	3
84	Ben Hancorn (ENG)	3
**Dean Young** (SCO)	**6**
83	**Rory McLeod** (JAM)	**6**
Ng On-yee (HKG)	2
110	**Ian Burns** (ENG)	**6**
Marco Fu (HKG)	5
94	**Peter Devlin** (ENG)	**6**
a	Yorrit Hoes (BEL)	1
99	**Jamie Wilson** (ENG)	**6**
a	Jake Crofts (ENG)	2
102	Chang Bingyu (CHN)	5
a	**Daniel Wells** (WAL)	**6**
91	Peter Lines (ENG)	5
a	**Sanderson Lam** (ENG)	**6**
107	Jamie O'Neill (ENG)	4
a	**James Cahill** (ENG)	**6**
86	**Yuan Sijun** (CHN)	**6**
a	Ross Muir (SCO)	3
87	Mitchell Mann (ENG)	0
a	**Dylan Emery** (WAL)	**6**
106	**Gerard Greene** (NIR)	**6**
a	Rebecca Kenna (ENG)	1
90	**Jackson Page** (WAL)	**6**
a	Sean O'Sullivan (ENG)	1
103	**Iulian Boiko** (UKR)	**6**
a	Michael Georgiou (CYP)	4
98	**Farakh Ajaib** (PAK)	**6**
a	Mark Lloyd (ENG)	5
95	Zak Surety (ENG)	4
a	**Si Jiahui** (CHN)	**6**
111	**Lei Peifan** (CHN)	**6**
Sean Maddocks (ENG)	0
82	**Wu Yize** (CHN)	**6**
a	Bai Langning (CHN)	2

**Round 2 (Last 112)**; Best of 11 frames
80	**Allan Taylor** (ENG)	**6**
Michael Judge (IRL)	5
49	**Scott Donaldson** (SCO)	**6**
a	Robbie McGuigan (NIR)	0
65	**Dominic Dale** (WAL)	**6**
96	Duane Jones (WAL)	3
64	**Lyu Haotian** (CHN)	**6**
97	Xu Si (CHN)	4
57	Sunny Akani (THA)	4
104	**Zhang Jiankang** (CHN)	**6**
72	Andy Hicks (ENG)	4
89	**Zhang Anda** (CHN)	**6**
56	Martin O'Donnell (ENG)	2
a	**Michael White** (WAL)	**6**
73	Fergal O'Brien (IRL)	5
a	**Liam Davies** (WAL)	**6**
76	Nigel Bond (ENG)	1
85	**Lukas Kleckers** (GER)	**6**
53	**Thepchaiya Un-Nooh** (THA)	**6**
108	Andrew Pagett (WAL)	4
69	**Michael Holt** (ENG)	**6**
92	Hammad Miah (ENG)	1
60	**Mark Joyce** (ENG)	**6**
101	Louis Heathcote (ENG)	5
61	Robbie Williams (ENG)	3
a	**David Lilley** (ENG)	**6**
68	**Tian Pengfei** (CHN)	**6**
93	Lee Walker (WAL)	4
52	**Joe O'Connor** (ENG)	**6**
109	Barry Pinches (ENG)	4
77	**Ashley Hugill** (ENG)	**6**
Dean Young (SCO)	0
78	Ken Doherty (IRL)	4
83	**Rory McLeod** (JAM)	**6**
51	**Elliot Slessor** (ENG)	**6**
110	Ian Burns (ENG)	0
67	**Oliver Lines** (ENG)	**6**
94	Peter Devlin (ENG)	1
62	**Chris Wakelin** (ENG)	**6**
99	Jamie Wilson (ENG)	2
59	Andrew Higginson (ENG)	4
a	**Daniel Wells** (WAL)	**6**
70	**Cao Yupeng** (CHN)	**6**
a	Sanderson Lam (ENG)	1
54	Mark Davis (ENG)	5
a	**James Cahill** (ENG)	**6**
75	Steven Hallworth (ENG)	3
86	**Yuan Sijun** (CHN)	**6**
74	**Gao Yang** (CHN)	**6**
a	Dylan Emery (WAL)	3
55	**Matthew Stevens** (WAL)	**6**
106	Gerard Greene (NIR)	1
71	Ashley Carty (ENG)	1
90	**Jackson Page** (WAL)	**6**
58	**David Grace** (ENG)	**6**
103	Iulian Boiko (UKR)	4
63	**Pang Junxu** (CHN)	**6**
98	Farakh Ajaib (PAK)	1
66	**Jamie Clarke** (WAL)	**6**
a	Si Jiahui (CHN)	5
50	Stuart Carrington (ENG)	3
111	**Lei Peifan** (CHN)	**6**
79	**Simon Lichtenberg** (GER)	**6**
82	Wu Yize (CHN)	4

**Round 3 (Last 80)**; Best of 11 frames
17	Ricky Walden (ENG)	4
80	**Allan Taylor** (ENG)	**6**
48	Li Hang (CHN)	5
49	**Scott Donaldson** (SCO)	**6**
32	Liang Wenbo (CHN)
65	**Dominic Dale** (WAL)	**w/o**
33	Lu Ning (CHN)	3
64	**Lyu Haotian** (CHN)	**6**
40	**Stephen Maguire** (SCO)	**6**
104	Zhang Jiankang (CHN)	3
25	**Zhou Yuelong** (CHN)	**6**
89	Zhang Anda (CHN)	5
41	Mark King (ENG)	1
a	**Michael White** (WAL)	**6**
24	**Jordan Brown** (NIR)	**6**
a	Liam Davies (WAL)	5
21	**Matthew Selt** (ENG)	**6**
85	Lukas Kleckers (GER)	5
44	Jak Jones (WAL)	5
53	**Thepchaiya Un-Nooh** (THA)	**6**
28	**Tom Ford** (ENG)	**6**
69	Michael Holt (ENG)	3
37	**Jamie Jones** (WAL)	**6**
60	Mark Joyce (ENG)	1
36	Kurt Maflin (NOR)	1
a	**David Lilley** (ENG)	**6**
29	**Ding Junhui** (CHN)	**6**
68	Tian Pengfei (CHN)	4
45	Ben Woollaston (ENG)	1
52	**Joe O'Connor** (ENG)	**6**
20	Martin Gould (ENG)	5
77	**Ashley Hugill** (ENG)	**6**
19	**David Gilbert** (ENG)	**6**
83	Rory McLeod (JAM)	1
46	**Anthony Hamilton** (ENG)	**6**
51	Elliot Slessor (ENG)	2
30	**Jimmy Robertson** (ENG)	**6**
67	Oliver Lines (ENG)	4
35	Fan Zhengyi (CHN)	5
62	**Chris Wakelin** (ENG)	**6**
38	**Noppon Saengkham** (THA)	**6**
a	Daniel Wells (WAL)	3
27	**Robert Milkins** (ENG)	**6**
70	Cao Yupeng (CHN)	3
43	**Liam Highfield** (ENG)	**6**
a	James Cahill (ENG)	5
22	Ryan Day (WAL)	1
86	**Yuan Sijun** (CHN)	**6**
23	**Ali Carter** (ENG)	**6**
74	Gao Yang (CHN)	4
42	Sam Craigie (ENG)	1
55	**Matthew Stevens** (WAL)	**6**
26	Joe Perry (ENG)	3
90	**Jackson Page** (WAL)	**6**
39	Xiao Guodong (CHN)	4
58	**David Grace** (ENG)	**6**
34	**Graeme Dott** (SCO)	**6**
63	Pang Junxu (CHN)	1
31	Gary Wilson (ENG)	0
66	**Jamie Clarke** (WAL)	**6**
47	Alexander Ursenbacher (SUI)	3
111	**Lei Peifan** (CHN)	**6**
18	**Hossein Vafaei** (IRN)	**6**
79	Simon Lichtenberg (GER)	0

**Round 4 (Last 48)**; Best of 19 frames
80	(England) Allan Taylor	1
49	(Scotland) **Scott Donaldson**	**10**
65	(Wales) Dominic Dale	4
64	(China) **Lyu Haotian**	**10**
40	(Scotland) **Stephen Maguire**	**10**
25	(China) Zhou Yuelong	7
a	(Wales) **Michael White**	**10**
24	(Northern Ireland) Jordan Brown	8
21	(England) Matthew Selt	7
53	(Thailand) **Thepchaiya Un-Nooh**	**10**
28	(England) Tom Ford	5
37	(Wales) **Jamie Jones**	**10**
a	(England) David Lilley	7
29	(China) **Ding Junhui**	**10**
52	(England) Joe O'Connor	7
77	(England) **Ashley Hugill**	**10**
19	(England) **David Gilbert**	**10**
46	(England) Anthony Hamilton	3
30	(England) Jimmy Robertson	7
62	(England) **Chris Wakelin**	**10**
38	(Thailand) **Noppon Saengkham**	**10**
27	(England) Robert Milkins	8
43	(England) **Liam Highfield**	**10**
86	(China) Yuan Sijun	7
23	(England) Ali Carter	8
55	(Wales) **Matthew Stevens**	**10**
90	(Wales) **Jackson Page**	**10**
58	(England) David Grace	6
34	(Scotland) Graeme Dott	8
66	(Wales) **Jamie Clarke**	**10**
111	(China) Lei Peifan	9
18	(Iran) **Hossein Vafaei**	**10**

== Century breaks ==
=== Main stage centuries ===
A total of 109 century breaks were made during the main stage of the tournament, surpassing the record set during the previous year's championship by one century. The highest was a maximum break by Neil Robertson.

- 147, 132, 131, 127, 117, 109, 109 – Neil Robertson
- 140, 106, 104 – Stuart Bingham
- 138, 138, 137, 137, 135, 127, 125, 121, 121, 121, 119, 117, 116, 110, 106, 100 – Mark Williams
- 137, 134, 132, 131, 129, 117 – Mark Selby
- 137, 122, 119, 106, 100 – Jack Lisowski
- 136, 109, 103 – Zhao Xintong
- 135, 128, 102 – Jackson Page
- 134, 131, 126, 123, 122, 121, 120, 118, 116, 109, 107, 105, 104, 101, 100 – Ronnie O'Sullivan
- 130 – Shaun Murphy
- 130 – Chris Wakelin
- 129, 124, 106 – Anthony McGill
- 128, 125, 123, 106, 105, 103, 100, 100 – John Higgins
- 127, 112, 110 – Noppon Saengkham
- 126, 103, 101 – Kyren Wilson
- 122, 117, 110 – Ding Junhui
- 121 – Hossein Vafaei
- 120, 114, 113, 110, 109, 107, 105, 105, 105, 103, 100 – Judd Trump
- 114 – Thepchaiya Un-Nooh
- 112, 106, 104, 103, 102, 102, 101, 100 – Yan Bingtao
- 110, 109, 107 – Mark Allen
- 109 – Luca Brecel
- 108 – Matthew Stevens
- 107, 102 – Stephen Maguire
- 103 – Lyu Haotian

=== Qualifying stage centuries ===
A total of 89 century breaks were made during the qualifying rounds. The highest was a maximum break by Dott.

- 147, 138, 107 – Graeme Dott
- 145, 138, 137, 116, 101 – Thepchaiya Un-Nooh
- 144 – Pang Junxu
- 141 – Ian Burns
- 139, 132 – Scott Donaldson
- 139, 130, 115, 100 – Matthew Stevens
- 137, 134 – Ding Junhui
- 137, 108, 104, 100 – Stephen Maguire
- 137 – Ali Carter
- 135 – Elliot Slessor
- 134, 110 – Andy Hicks
- 133 – David Grace
- 133 – Ricky Walden
- 132, 129, 115, 109, 105 – Zhang Anda
- 131, 121, 108 – Chris Wakelin
- 131 – Barry Pinches
- 131 – Jimmy Robertson
- 131 – Zhang Jiankang
- 130, 126, 120, 106, 105 – Yuan Sijun
- 130 – Jordan Brown
- 127 – Liam Davies
- 123, 104 – Liam Highfield
- 123 – Tom Ford
- 122, 116, 100 – Andrew Pagett
- 122 – Chang Bingyu
- 122 – Marco Fu
- 119, 115 – Lyu Haotian
- 119 – Jamie Clarke
- 118 – Mark Davis
- 116, 116, 115 – Lei Peifan
- 116, 113, 111 – Noppon Saengkham
- 116, 104, 103 – Jackson Page
- 116 – Xu Si
- 115 – David Lilley
- 114 – Jamie Wilson
- 113, 113 – James Cahill
- 112, 107 – Ashley Hugill
- 110 – Dominic Dale
- 110 – Zhou Yuelong
- 108, 100 – Iulian Boiko
- 108 – Joe O'Connor
- 106 – Si Jiahui
- 104 – Matthew Selt
- 103 – Daniel Wells
- 102, 100 – Gao Yang
- 101, 100 – David Gilbert
- 100 – Jamie Jones
- 100 – Lee Walker
- 100 – Michael White
