= Salboy =

Property developer and real estate investment company

Salboy Ltd
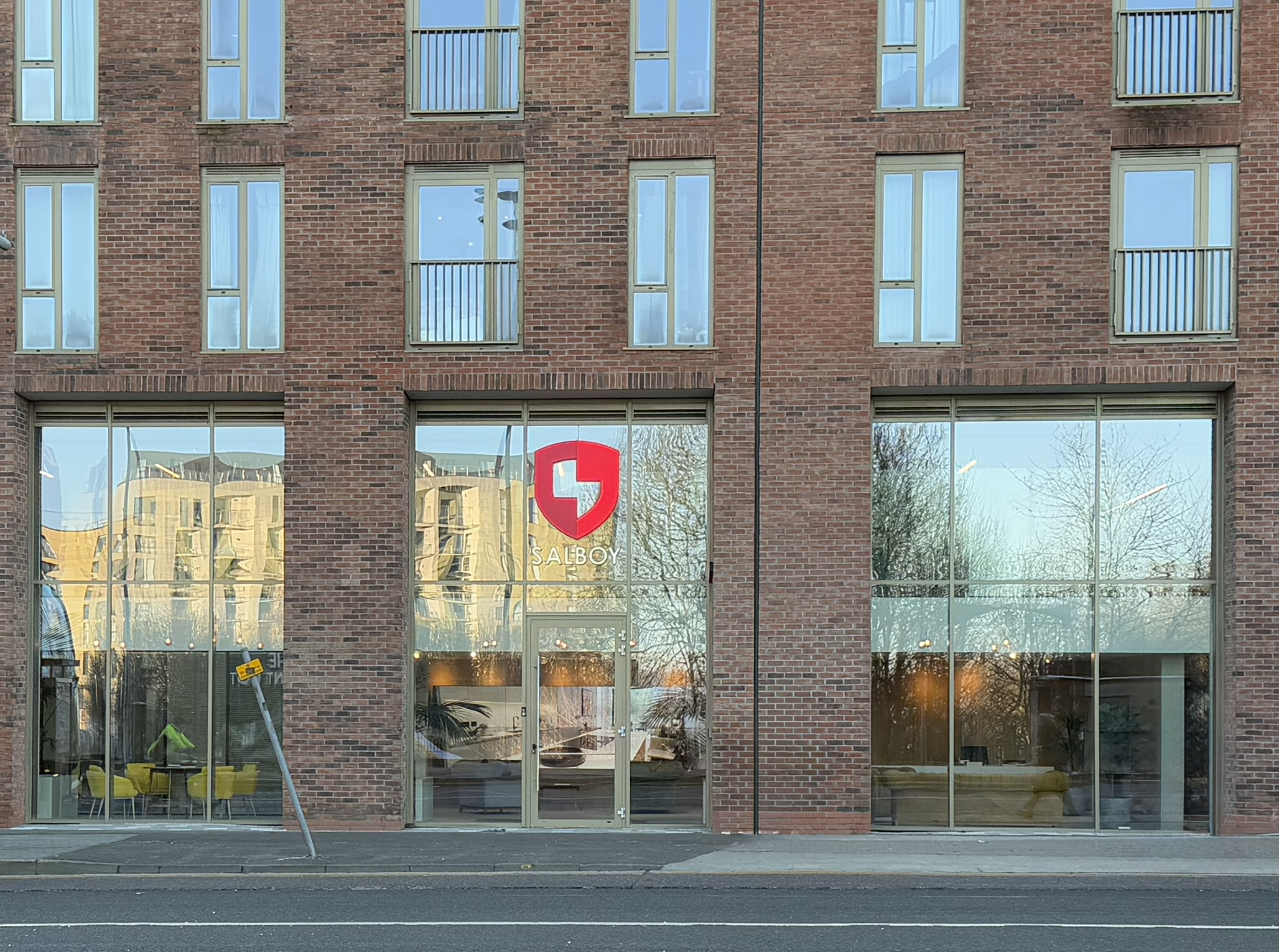
- Salboy Headquarters in the Crescent area of Salford, Greater Manchester in February 2025
- Company type: Private
- Industry: Real estate
- Founded: July 9, 2014; 11 years ago
- Founder: Simon Ismail; Fred Done
- Headquarters: Salford, United Kingdom (headquarters)
- Area served: United Kingdom
- Revenue: ▲£48.48 million (2024)
- Operating income: ▼£6.03 million (2024)
- Website: https://salboy.com

Salboy Ltd is a property development and real estate investment company headquartered in Salford, United Kingdom. It was founded in 2014 by Simon Ismail and Fred Done. Initially the company invested in other property developments but later transitioned into a developer with the aim of building high-quality developments. They are known for their high-rise buildings in Greater Manchester, such as the Viadux.

In addition to delivering their own developments, the company also offers both financial funding and expert guidance to projects by other developers through their Salboy Build Partner programme, for a share of the development's ownership.

In 2017, Salboy International was launched as a subsidiary to facilitate marketing and sale of Salboy's developments to a global audience.

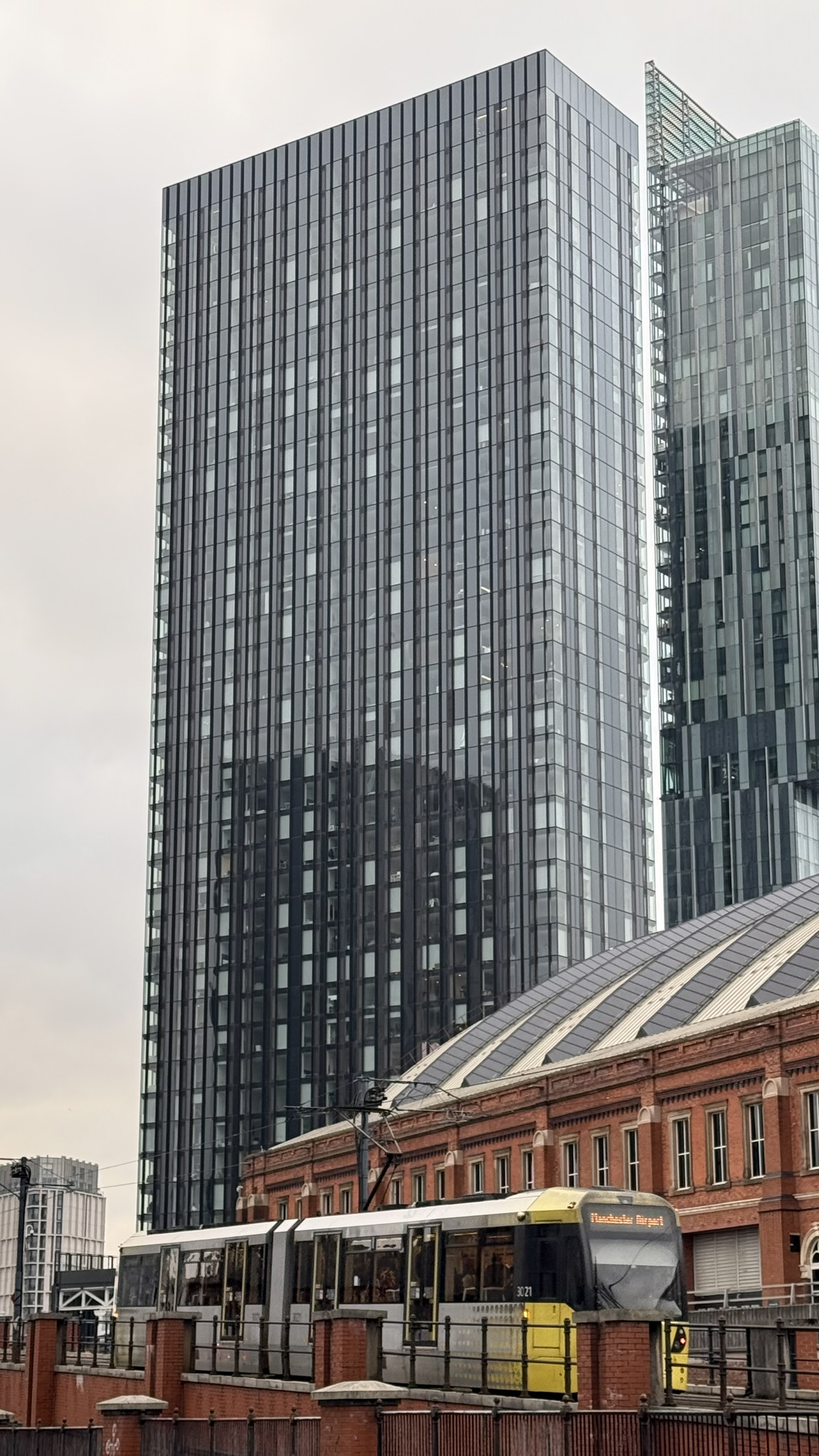
Viadux residential building developed by Salboy

== Major projects ==
- Fifty5ive completed in 2022
- Glassworks completed in 2023
- Viadux first phase completed in 2024; second phase proposed.
- W Hotel & Residences under construction as of February 2025

== Controversies ==
The company's Glassworks building has faced criticism for its design which some have argued does not fit in with the character of Northern Quarter wherein it is based.

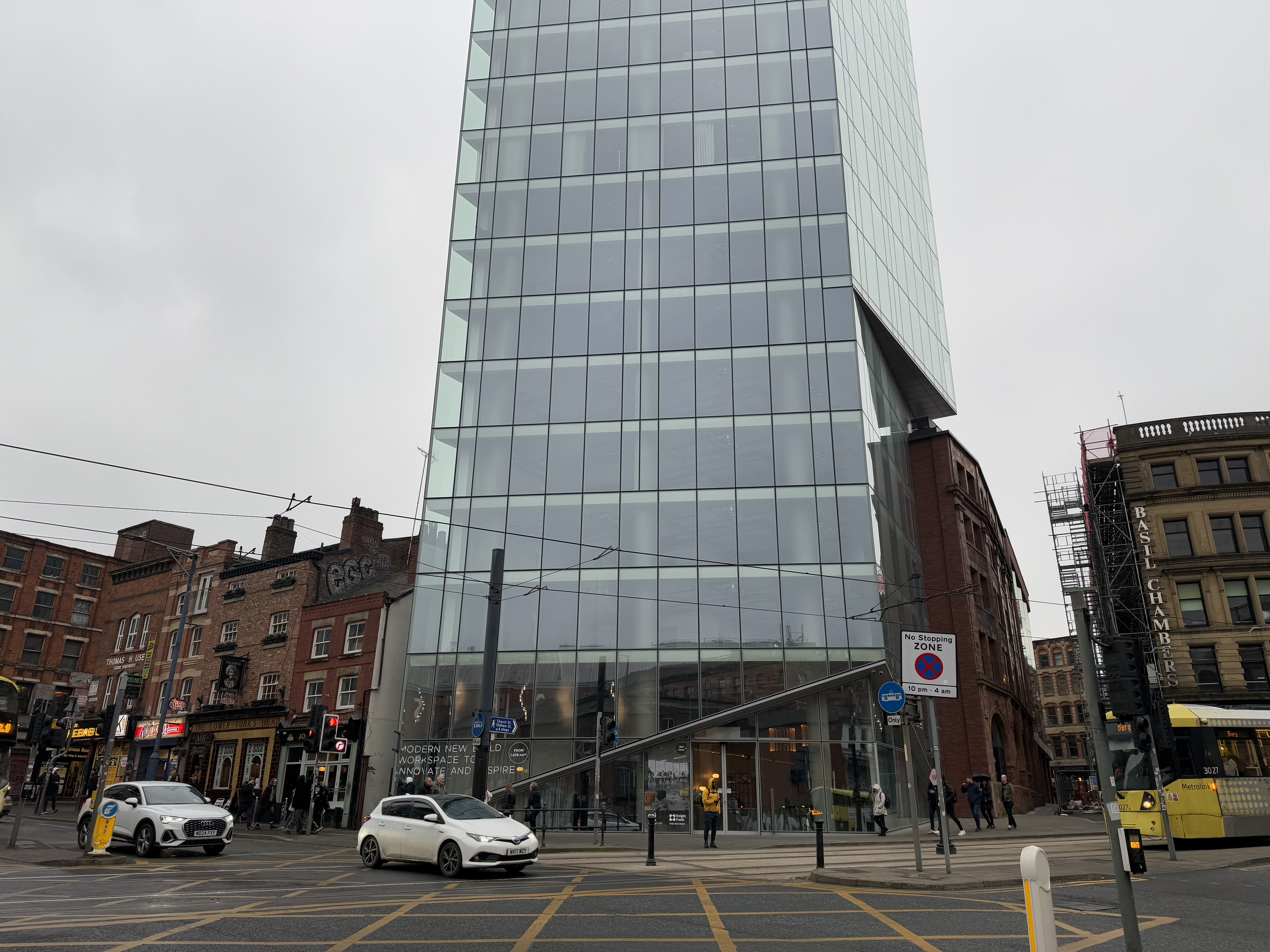
Glassworks standing within the Northern Quarter area next to red brick buildings.
