= Central and North West London NHS Foundation Trust =

Trust of the National Health Service (NHS) providing for Central and North West London

- Type: NHS foundation trust
- Established: 1 April 2002
- Chair: Tom Kibasi
- Chief executive: Claire Murdoch
- Staff: 9,105
- Website: www.cnwl.nhs.uk

Central and North West London NHS Foundation Trust is an NHS Foundation Trust in England. It provides healthcare in London, Milton Keynes, Surrey and elsewhere. It was created in 2002 by a merger between Brent, Kensington & Chelsea, Westminster Mental Health NHS Trust, Harrow and Hillingdon Healthcare Trust, and the substance misuse service component of Hounslow and Spelthorne Community and Mental Health NHS Trust. It subsequently won additional contracts, including Milton Keynes Community Health Services from April 2013. CNWL is a member of Imperial College Health Partners.

== Services ==
The Trust provides the following services:

- Mental Health and Community services for Milton Keynes and the London boroughs of Brent, Harrow, Hillingdon, Kensington and Chelsea, and Westminster
- Sexual Health services in London and Surrey
- Health and Justice services for prisons and young offender institutions in London and South East England

In 2017 the trust established a subsidiary company, Quality Trusted Solutions Ltd, to which 35 staff were transferred. The intention was to achieve pay bill savings, by recruiting new staff on less expensive non-NHS contracts.

Since 2018, the trust has run a support service for those affected by the Grenfell Tower fire.

== Performance ==
It was named by the Health Service Journal as one of the top hundred NHS trusts to work for in 2015. At that time it had 5745 full-time equivalent staff and a sickness absence rate of 3.51%.

== See also ==
- List of NHS trusts
