= Betfred =

UK bookmaker

Betfred Group Holdings Limited
- Company type: Private
- Industry: Gambling
- Founded: 1967
- Headquarters: Birchwood, Cheshire, Warrington, England, United Kingdom
- Owner: Fred Done, also founder and chairman
- Website: Official website

Betfred Group Holdings Limited is a bookmaker based in the United Kingdom, founded by Fred Done. (Note: Pronounced to rhyme with "bone".) It was first established as a single betting shop in Ordsall, Salford, in 1967. Its turnover in 2004 was reported to be more than £3.5 billion, having risen from £550 million in 2003 and has continued to grow to over £10 billion in 2018–2019. Following a drop in 2020 and 2021 as a result of the Covid-19 pandemic, published turnover for the year to September 2022 was £8.8 billion.

It has its head office is in Birchwood, Warrington, and also has offices in Media City, Salford Quays, Salford.

Betfred.com, the company's online gambling site, is based in Gibraltar and registered as Petfre (Gibraltar) Limited.

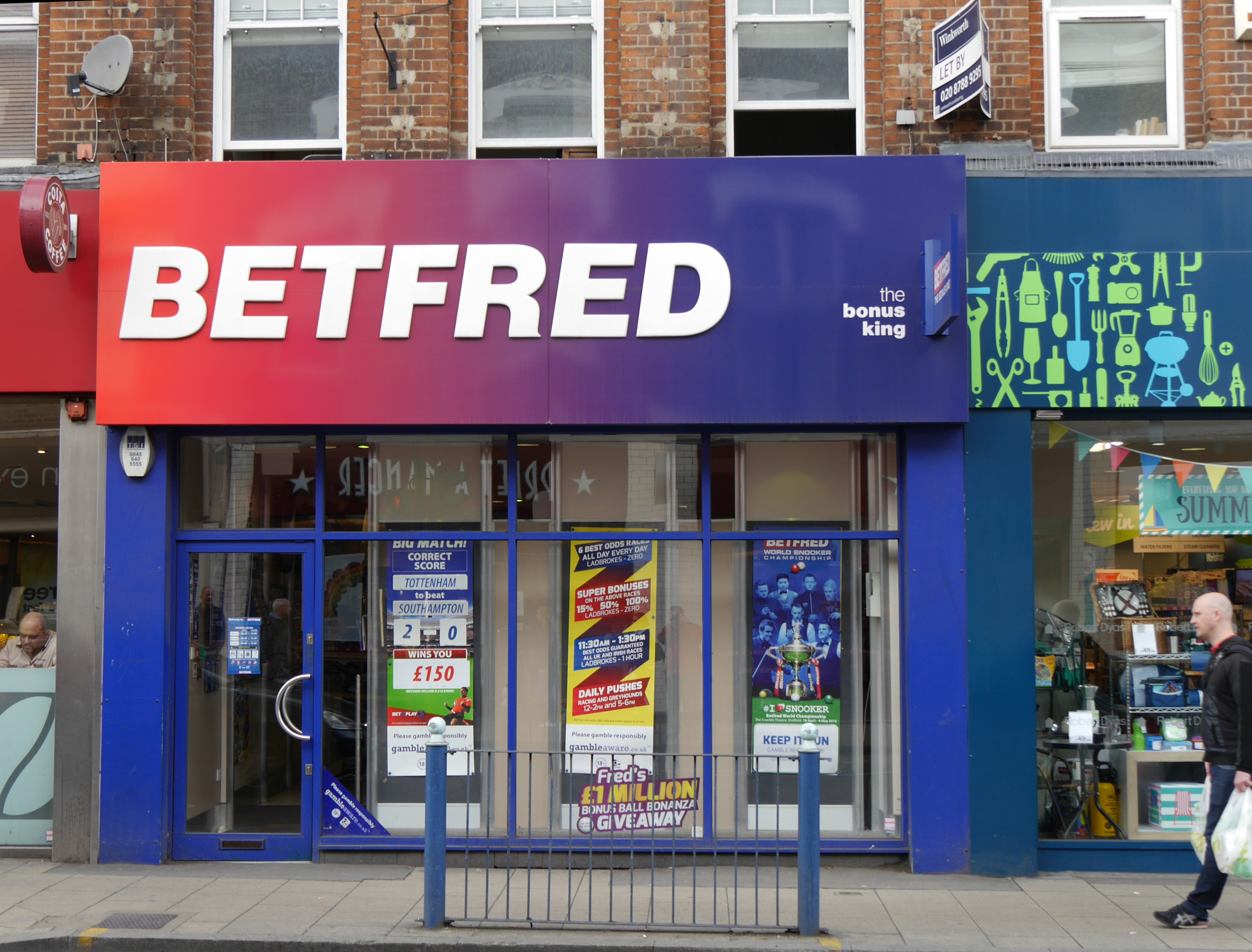
Betfred, Putney, London (2015)

== History ==
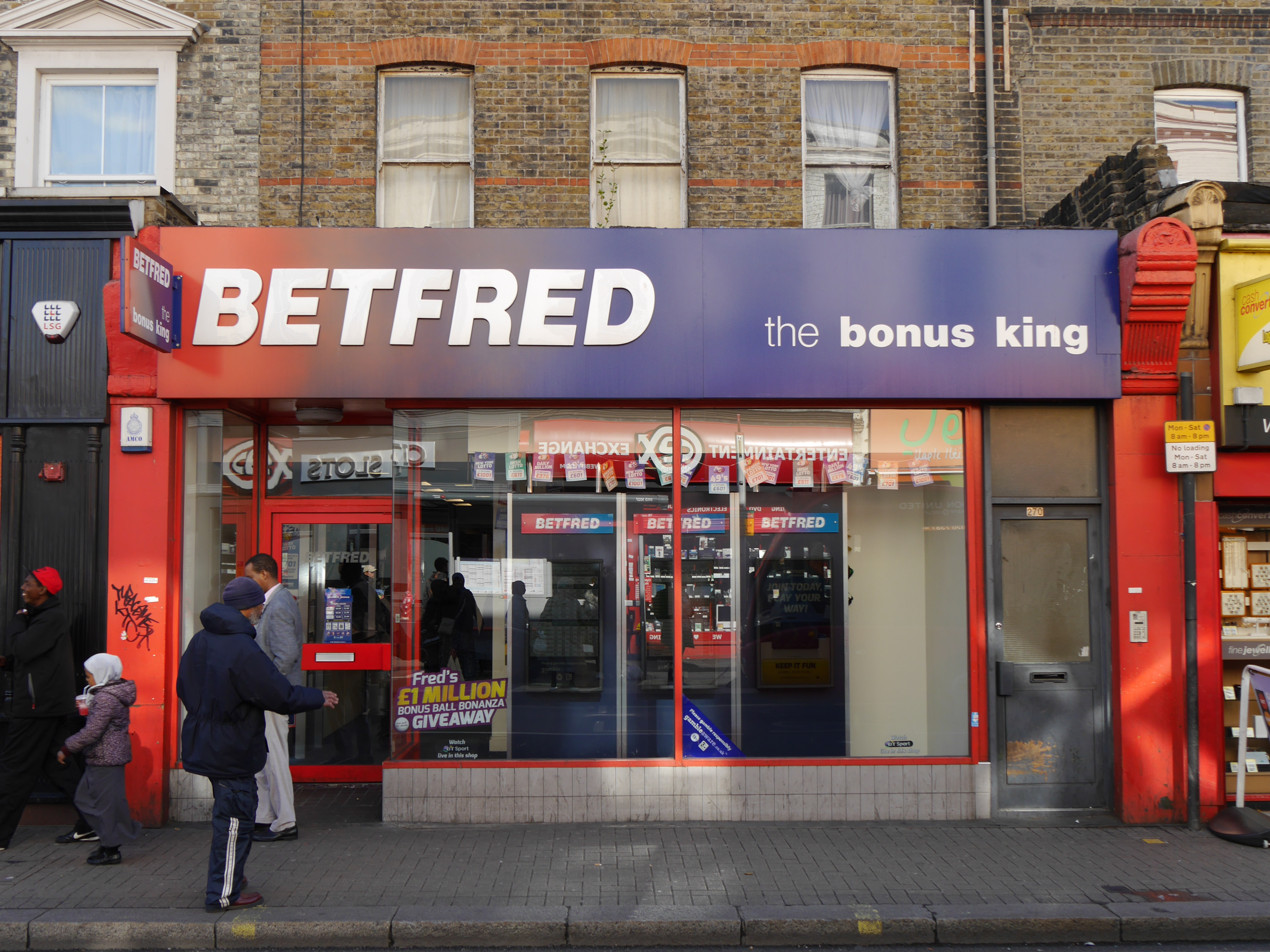
Betfred, North End Road, Fulham, London (2015)

Done Bookmakers was first established as a single shop in Ordsall, Salford, in 1967. Fred Done financed the first Done Bookmakers shop with capital made from a winning bet he placed on England to win the 1966 World Cup. In 1997, Done Bookmakers acquired the Robert Walker chain of bookmakers, taking their total to one hundred shops. A mixture of organic and acquisition growth has resulted in Betfred being the largest independent retail bookmaker in the UK.

By 2000, the total number of shops nationwide had risen to two hundred, and in 2002, Done Bookmakers opened their first shop in the Greater London area.

The current name Betfred was first used in 2004. In 2004, Betfred also launched their digital platform Betfred.com and offer sports betting, online casino, online games, bingo, lotto, online poker and virtual sports as well as pool betting. In November 2004, a Betfred customer became the first betting shop millionaire; a customer known only as Ken selected six winners on the totescoop6 and pocketed £1,132,657 in a Salford shop.

Betfred's retail expansion continued with shops opening around the United Kingdom. Betfred's five-hundredth shop opened in Cardiff in 2005. In 2013, the company established Betfred TV, an in-house channel that is available in all shops both on the high street and on the racecourse.

Fred Done was the first bookmaker to pay out early (i.e., before the result was guaranteed), when in March 1998 it paid out to gamblers who had bet that Manchester United F.C. would win the Premier League, only for Arsenal to pip United by one point.

During the 2004–05 FA Premier League season, Done lost £1m to fellow bookmaker Victor Chandler after staking that amount that Manchester United would finish higher than Chelsea. The bet was offered to other high-profile bookmakers yet only Chandler took him up on the offer. Chelsea finished 18 points clear of third-placed Manchester United and won their first Premiership title under José Mourinho.

Betfred also paid out early on Manchester United to win the 2011–12 Premier League title, only for Manchester City to beat them on goal difference.

It was widely reported in April 2010 that Fred Done formed part of the "Red Knights" consortium that were looking to buy English Premier League club Manchester United from the Glazer family. The reports proved to be incorrect, but Done remained a season ticket holder at Old Trafford.

As of July 2017, Betfred operated over 1,650 shops throughout the United Kingdom, after the purchase of 322 shops due to the merger between fellow bookmakers Ladbrokes and Coral in October 2016. Betfred also operates shops on fifty one racecourses around the country, including Newmarket, Epsom and Cheltenham. In August 2017, Betfred appointed former Nottingham Forest and England footballer Stuart Pearce as its brand ambassador. The company believed Pearce to be the epitome of Betfred: uncomplicated.

In September 2017, Betfred celebrated their 50th year of business. A documentary film about the history of the company was released on the official channel of Betfred on YouTube. In July 2018, Betfred won a court case against HM Revenue & Customs (HMRC). The ruling states that Betfred overpaid Value-Added Tax (VAT), and could see a £100 million refund.

In November 2018, punter David Smith took Betfred to court after he claimed to have won a jackpot of £212,000, having mistakenly written "Bailarico", a losing horse, on the betting slip, rather than "Bialco", a winner. The betting arbitrator IBAS ruled against him.

=== Ownership's conflict of interest with Health Assured ===
In January 2020, Betfred owners Peter and Fred Done came under public scrutiny after reports emerged that Health Assured, another company the two owned, was earning millions of pounds through government contracts to provide gambling addiction treatment for public sector workers. The arrangement prompted conflict of interest allegations from NHS chief Claire Murdoch and a number of MPs.

== Sponsorship ==
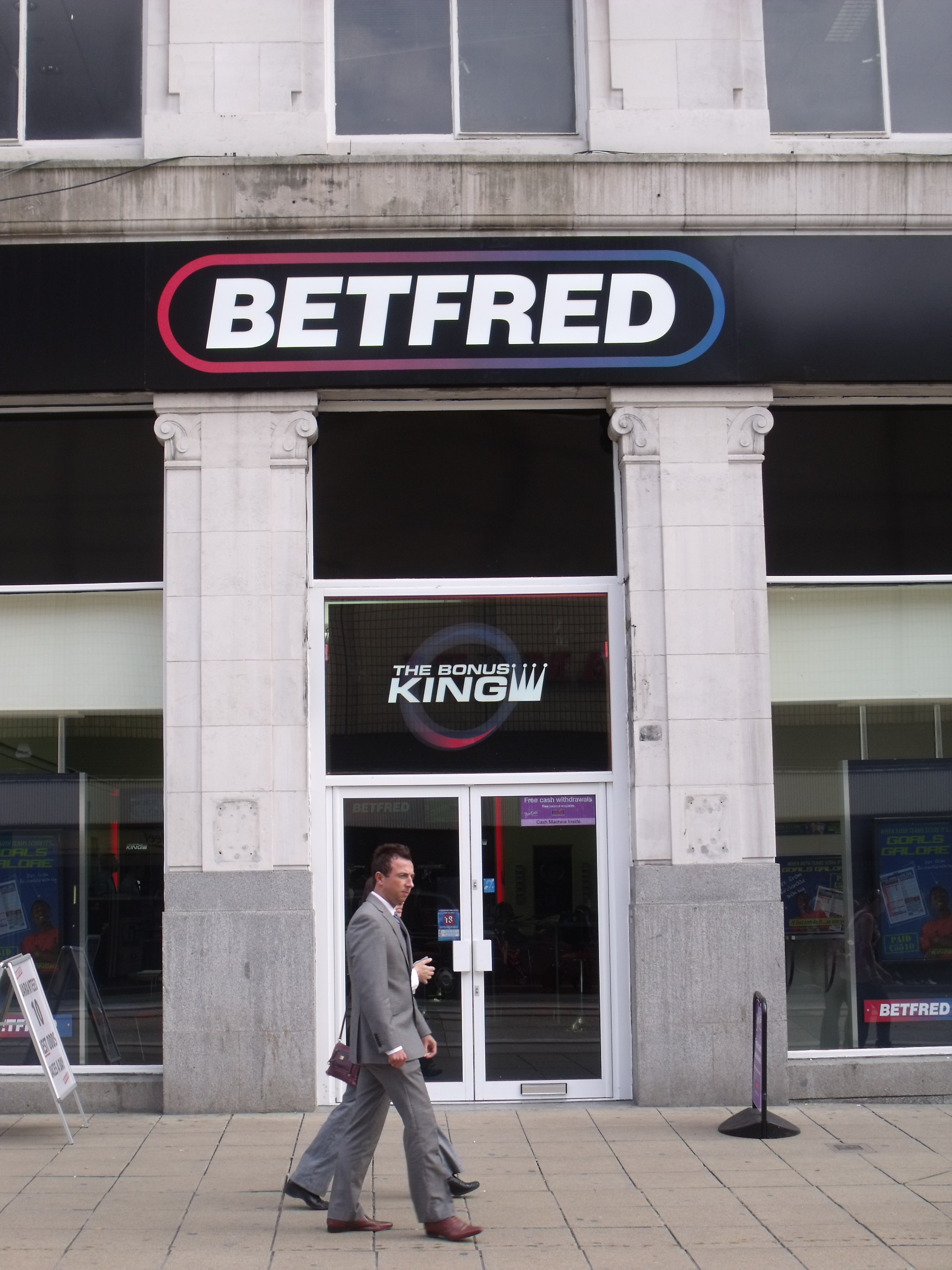
Betfred shop in Manchester (2011)

=== Horse racing ===
Betfred is one of the largest sponsors of horse racing in the United Kingdom, with races spread across racecourses in the country, including the Midlands National run at Uttoxeter Racecourse, the Dante Stakes and Ebor Handicap both at York Racecourse, and the Betfred Cesarewitch Handicap on the Rowley Mile course at Newmarket Racecourse.

In 2005, Betfred became sponsors of the Group One Sprint Cup at Haydock Park. The race is run over the minimum distance of five furlongs. The sponsorship ended in 2016. Betfred also sponsored the most prestigious jumps race the Cheltenham Gold Cup between the years of 2012 and 2015.

=== Rugby league ===
In October 2016, Betfred began a three-year period as the main sponsor of rugby league's Super League, the northern hemisphere's top-level professional rugby league with ten teams spread across England, and one in France. In October 2021, Betfred signed a renewed agreement with the rugby Super League Europe

=== Snooker ===
Betfred sponsored the World Snooker Championships from 2009 to 2012, before losing the sponsorship rights. In 2015, it was announced that Betfred were to become the sponsors of the tournament once again, and increase the winner's prize money to £375,000.

=== Football ===
Betfred was the official betting partner of Manchester United from 2006 to 2013. This partnership was renewed ahead of the 2022–2023 football season.

In May 2016, it was announced that Betfred would take over sponsorship of the Scottish League Cup for three years, rebranding it the Betfred Cup. In June 2017, Betfred was confirmed as the new official shirt sponsors of Championship side Bolton Wanderers, in an agreement which lasted for two years.

In June 2019, Betfred took over the shirt sponsorship rights for RCD Mallorca for the next two years.

=== Darts ===
In July 2019, Betfred announced that it had been installed as the official sponsor for the PDC's World Matchplay tournament until 2022. Betfred announced before the 2022 event that they had renewed the sponsorship deal, which will see them become sponsors of the tournament until 2025.

=== Golf ===
In August, 2024, Betfred was the title sponsor of the Betfred British Masters hosted by Sir Nick Faldo.

=== Sponsorships in the USA ===
Betfredsports.com, Betfred's digital and retail presence in the US, has official partnerships with NFL teams, the Denver Broncos and Cincinnati Bengals, whilst they are partners of the Colorado Rockies of the MLB and Loudoun United FC of the USL Championship, which includes a jersey sponsorship.

== The Tote ==
On 3 June 2011, Betfred won the auction to purchase The Tote, the government-owned betting operation, in a deal worth £265m. The counter bid was lodged by the SIP (Sports Investment Partners) consortium headed by former city banker and British Airways chairman Sir Martin Broughton. Betfred pledged £155m into racing over the next seven years, as well as creating the Tote Racing Development Board, giving greater say to industry figures.

In September 2016, according to the Department for Digital, Culture, Media and Sport "In terms of the Tote Racing Development Board, I can confirm that as a stand alone concept it has not been set up to date. Betfred has confirmed that Totepool work with race course owners and management on a continuing basis (which may serve the same purpose as the intended Tote racing development board)."

The deal gave Betfred exclusive control over the on course betting system for seven years. In 2018, the exclusive licence taken out by Betfred officially ran out.

== Regulatory action ==
In June 2016 the Gambling Commission required Betfred to pay more than £800,000 in compensation and in contribution towards socially responsible causes as part of a regulatory settlement.

This was in response to Betfred's failure to adhere to its anti money laundering and social responsibility policies. The Gambling Commission's investigation followed a court case that resulted in one customer of Betfred being jailed for three years and four months, after admitting to stealing from his employer. A significant proportion of the stolen money was spent with Betfred.

In April 2019 the Commission ordered Betfred and Paddy Power to terminate new betting products. This followed the introduction of reduced maximum stakes on fixed odds betting terminals (FOBTS) from £100 to £2. The commission was "concerned that the new products undermine the changes made".

The Guardian accused the companies of trying to circumvent the government's enforced FOBTs £2 reduction, with their new games. Betfred's "Virtual Cycling" product offered customers the chance to wager up to £500 per stake. Both Paddy Power and Betfred withdrew their games. The Gambling Commission said it was investigating the matter and that both bookmakers could "still face regulatory action", as it investigated "key senior staff at bookmakers who are responsible for bringing those products to market".

In October 2019 the Commission ordered Petfre, Betfred's parent, to pay £322,000 for money laundering failures.

An investigation revealed the operator had failed to carry out adequate "source of funds" checks on a customer who deposited £210,000, and lost £140,000, of stolen money over one twelve-day period in November 2017. The Commission said that one customer who was able to deposit and lose such significant amounts in such a short period of time clearly indicated failings in the effectiveness of Petfre's anti money laundering policies and procedures.

In April 2021, Betfred lost a High Court case against Andrew Green from Lincolnshire who had won £1.7 million in a Jackpot Game. Betfred had denied payments due to faulty software but High Court ruled against Betfred.

In September 2022, Betfred's online division, Petfre (Gibraltar) Limited, was fined £2.87 million by the UK Gambling Commission for shortcomings in social responsibility and anti-money-laundering measures.

== Broadcasting ==
The company are the brand owners of Thesportsman.com (The Sportsman Communications Limited), an online sports news and broadcaster established in 2017. Betfred chairman, Fred Done is a major shareholder of The Sportsman Communications Limited. Starting as a sport news website, the company stepped forward into live sport broadcasting when it signed a deal with the Rugby Football League to show a number of matches from the 2021 Challenge Cup. This was followed with a 2022 deal to show rugby league games from the Challenge Cup, League 1, the Women's Super League and Wheelchair rugby league.
