= Viadux =

Skyscraper complex under construction in Manchester, England

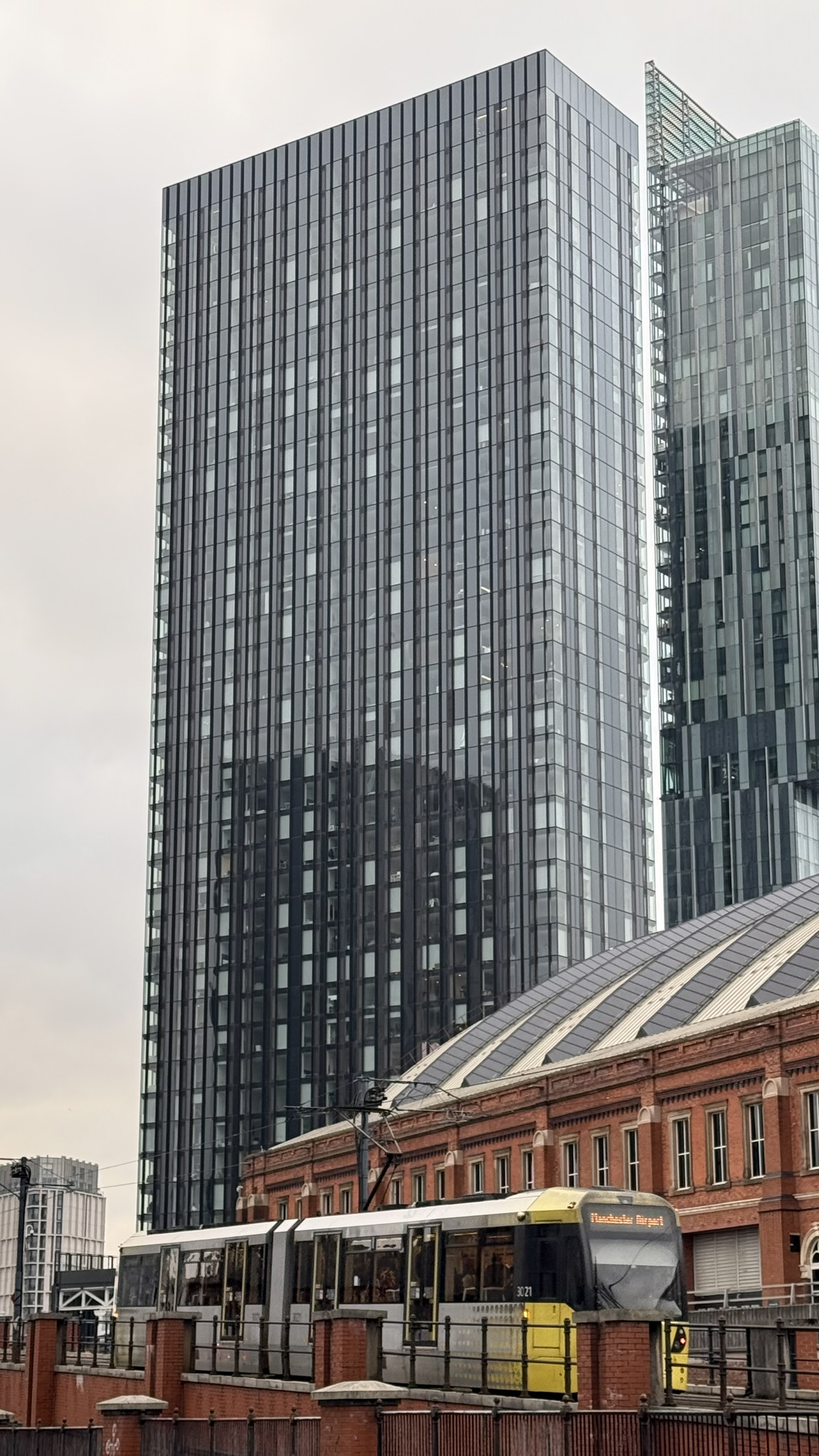
- Viadux Building B2 with Beetham Tower (right) and Manchester Central (lower right), February 2025

- Location within Greater Manchester
- Former names: Viadux Residential Building, Former Bauer Millet Site

General information
- Status: Viadux Building B2: Completed; Nobu Manchester: Under construction
- Type: Residential skyscraper
- Location: Great Bridgewater Street, Castlefield, Manchester, England
- Coordinates: 53.47531°N 2.24909°W
- Construction started: Viadux Building B2: 2021
- Completed: Viadux Building B2: 2024; 2 years ago
- Cost: Viadux 1: £300 million Viadux 2: £350 million
- Owner: Salboy

Height
- Height: Viadux Building B2: 139 m (456 ft)

Technical details
- Floor count: Viadux Building B2: 40
- Floor area: Viadux Building B2: 27,900 m^{2} (300,000 sq ft)

Design and construction
- Architect: SimpsonHaugh
- Main contractor: Domis

Website
- Official website

Viadux is a mixed-use skyscraper complex under construction on Great Bridgewater Street in the Castlefield area of Manchester, England. The first phase comprises a 40-storey residential tower that was completed in 2024. The second phase, approved in May 2025, includes the 246-metre (807 ft), 76-storey Nobu Manchester which will contain apartments and a 160-bed hotel and is planned to become the tallest building in Greater Manchester, as well as a 23-storey residential building.

At 139 metres (456 ft), the first phase Viadux Building B2 is the 14th-tallest in Greater Manchester, as of August 2026. It was designed by SimpsonHaugh, who also designed the adjacent Beetham Tower, which was completed in 2006.

== History ==
=== Planning ===
A planning application for a 40-storey residential building, 14-storey office building, together with ground floor commercial space, was submitted to Manchester City Council in April 2017, with approval obtained in July 2017. A number of planning condition variations and non material amendments for the development were subsequently made.

In October 2022, it was reported that the developer Salboy was looking to replace the approved office element with a second apartment building that could be up to 60 storeys.

In November 2023, second phase plans were unveiled by the developer for a 76-storey skyscraper and a 23-storey building, with a combined total of 900 apartments. The tower was proposed to be 241 m (790 ft).

In October 2024, Salboy announced that the second phase plans would be redesigned to accommodate a 160-bed hotel on the lower floors of the tower. The number of apartments in the building would reduce from 782 to 452 and its overall height would slightly increase as a result.

In April 2025, Manchester City Council initially approved plans for the second phase scheme, known as Viadux 2. The following month, it was reported that the Music Venue Trust had not been properly consulted due to an administrative error, requiring the application to be reheard at a planning committee on 29 May 2025. The council approved the scheme for the second time.

When constructed, at 246 m (807 ft), Viadux 2's skyscraper Nobu Manchester will overtake Deansgate Square South Tower to become the tallest building in Greater Manchester, the tallest building outside London, as well as the third-tallest building in the United Kingdom.

=== Construction ===
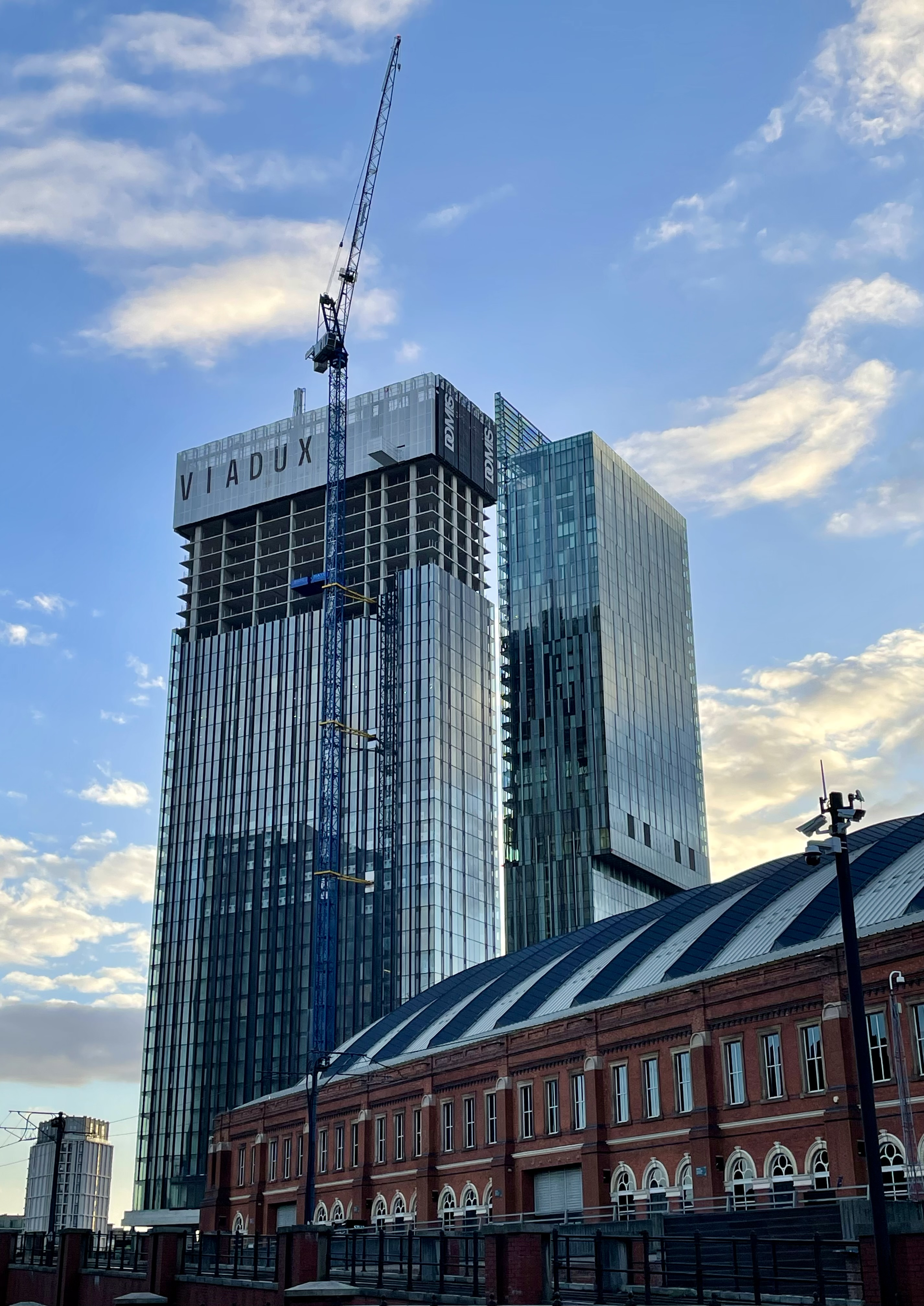
Viadux Building B2 under construction, with Beetham Tower (right) and Manchester Central (lower right), August 2023

Construction of the first phase Viadux Building B2 commenced in 2021 and completed in 2024. The residential tower contains 375 apartments.

In April 2023, a construction worker was injured after a reported explosion at the tower.

The construction company Domis was expected to start work on the second phase in 2025. Groundbreaking for Nobu Manchester took place in November 2025, with co-owner Robert De Niro in attendance.

== Amenities ==
Viadux is located close to Deansgate-Castlefield tram stop, with access to Deansgate railway station via a footbridge. It is also adjacent to Deansgate and the Manchester Central Convention Complex (commonly known as Manchester Central or GMEX).

== See also ==
- List of tallest buildings and structures in Greater Manchester
- List of tallest buildings in the United Kingdom
