= Claire Murdoch =

Claire Louise Murdoch CBE is the Chief Executive of the Central and North West London NHS Foundation Trust and former national director for mental health, NHS England.

She was rated by the Health Service Journal as the seventeenth most influential person in the English NHS in 2016. She was the inaugural Chair of the Cavendish Square Group of the 10 London NHS trusts responsible for mental health services, succeeded by John Brouder, Chief Executive of North East London NHS Foundation Trust (NELFT) in 2018.

She was involved in the development of a rating system for Clinical Commissioning Groups performance in mental health during 2016.

She has particularly supported moves to ensure mentally ill people, especially children and adolescents are treated nearer their homes.

She was appointed a Commander of the Order of the British Empire (CBE) in the 2019 New Year Honours for services to the NHS.

Her sister Alison Reynolds received the British Empire Medal (BEM) in the 2018 New Year Honours for services to Community Sport in Kent.

Since 1984 Murdoch has been a mental health nurse.
