= 2022 European Masters (2022–23 season) =

Snooker tournament held in August 2022

2022 BetVictor European Masters
Tournament information
- Dates: 16–21 August 2022
- Venue: Stadthalle Fürth
- City: Fürth
- Country: Germany
- Organisation: World Snooker Tour
- Format: Ranking event
- Total prize fund: £427,000
- Winner's share: £80,000
- Highest break: Zhang Anda (CHN) (147); Hossein Vafaei (IRN) (147)

Final
- Champion: Kyren Wilson (ENG)
- Runner-up: Barry Hawkins (ENG)
- Score: 9–3

The 2022 European Masters (officially the 2022 BetVictor European Masters) was a professional snooker tournament that took place from 16 to 21 August 2022 at the Stadthalle Fürth in Fürth, Germany. Broadcast on Eurosport and other networks worldwide, the tournament was the second ranking event of the 2022–23 season and the second of eight tournaments in the season's BetVictor Series. The 24th edition of the European Masters, it was the second staging of the event in 2022 after the previous event in February. It featured a total prize fund of £427,000, of which the winner received £80,000.

The defending champion was Fan Zhengyi, who defeated Ronnie O'Sullivan 10–9 in the final of the tournament's previous edition. However, Fan lost 1–5 to Michael Judge in his held-over qualifying match. O'Sullivan, the reigning world champion and world number one, withdrew from the event for medical reasons. Kyren Wilson defeated Barry Hawkins 9–3 in the final to win the fifth ranking title of his career. The highest break prize was shared by Zhang Anda and Hossein Vafaei, both of whom made maximum breaks in the qualifying round.

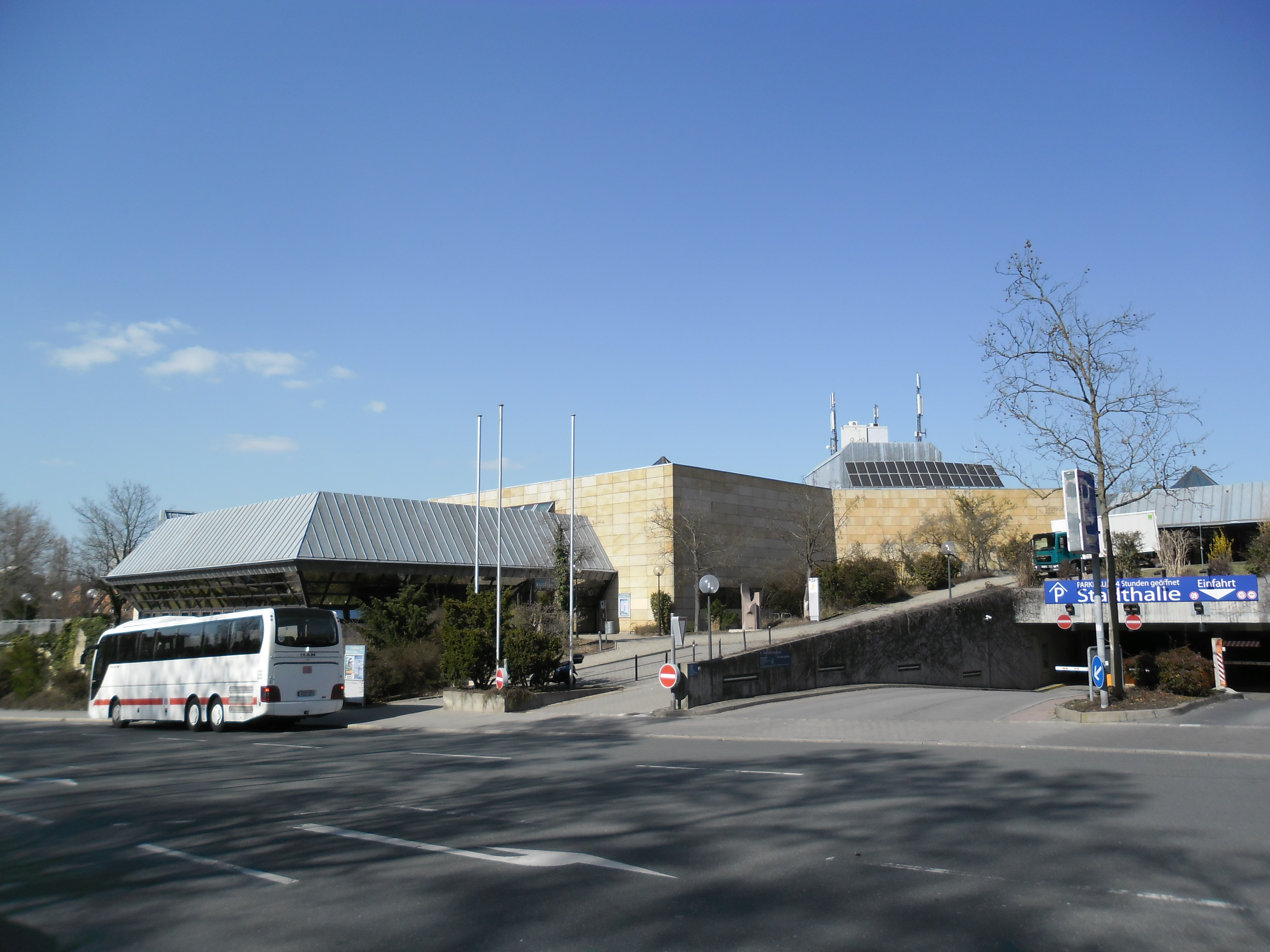
The main event took place at the Stadthalle Fürth in Fürth, Germany.

== Format ==
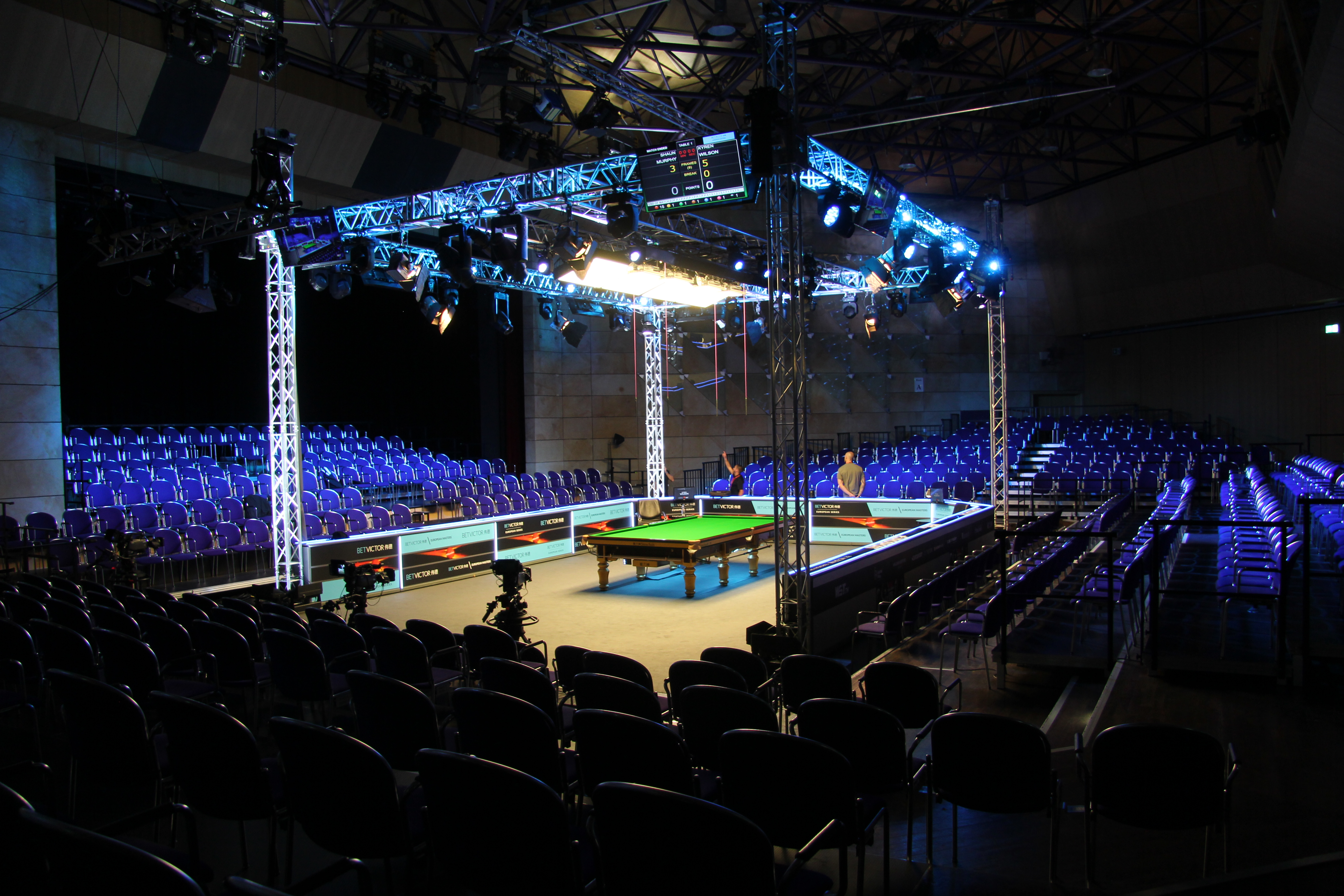
Main Table

The 2022 European Masters was a professional ranking snooker tournament played between 16 and 21 August 2022 at the Stadthalle Fürth in Germany. The second ranking event of the 2022–23 season, it followed the Championship League and preceded the British Open. The second of eight tournaments in the season's BetVictor Series, it was the 24th edition of the European Masters tournament, the first having been held as the European Open in 1989. It was the second staging of the European Masters in 2022; the previous tournament, held in February 2022, was won by Fan Zhengyi, who defeated Ronnie O'Sullivan 10–9 in the final. Matches at the event were played as the best of nine frames until the semi-finals, which were best of 11. The final was a best-of-17-frame match played over two sessions. The event was broadcast on Eurosport across Europe. In China, the event was broadcast on Liaoning TV, Superstar Online, Migu, Youku and Huya Live. It was also broadcast on the Premier Sports Network in the Philippines; on Now TV in Hong Kong; on True Sport in Thailand; on Sport Cast in Taiwan and Indonesia; on Astro SuperSport in Malaysia; and on DAZN in Canada. In all other locations, the event was broadcast on Matchroom Sport.

=== Prize fund ===
The event featured a prize fund of £427,000, with the winner receiving £80,000. The breakdown of prize money for this event is shown below:

- Winner: £80,000
- Runner-up: £35,000
- Semi-final: £17,500
- Quarter-final: £11,000
- Last 16: £7,500
- Last 32: £4,500
- Last 64: £3,000
- Highest break: £5,000
- Total: £427,000

== Summary ==
=== Qualifying round ===
Qualifiers for the tournament were held from 15 to 17 July and 22 to 24 July 2022 at the Morningside Arena in Leicester, although qualifying matches featuring the defending champion, Fan Zhengyi, and those involving Mark Selby and Judd Trump, were held over to be played in Fürth. World number one Ronnie O'Sullivan also had his qualifying match held over, but he withdrew for medical reasons a week before the tournament and was replaced in the draw by Luke Simmonds.

On 16 July, Zhang Anda made a maximum break during his 5–1 win over Anton Kazakov; the following day, Hossein Vafaei made a maximum as he defeated Ng On-yee by the same score. It was the first time either player had made a 147 in professional competition. World number five John Higgins lost his qualifying match 3–5 to his Scottish compatriot Scott Donaldson. World number 14 Mark Allen lost 3–5 to amateur player Farakh Ajaib, while world number 19 David Gilbert lost 1–5 to Marco Fu and world number 21 Matthew Selt lost 1–5 to another amateur player, Haydon Pinhey. Jimmy Robertson came from 0–4 behind to defeat Zhao Jianbo 5–4, while Jimmy White came from 0–3 behind to defeat Andrew Pagett 5–4, his first professional victory since the 2021 British Open the previous August. Seven-time world champion Stephen Hendry was whitewashed 0–5 by Mark Joyce.

=== Early rounds ===
The opening round and held-over qualifying matches were played on 16 and 17 August. The defending champion Fan lost 1–5 to Michael Judge in his held-over qualifying match. World number three Selby lost his held-over qualifier 2–5 to Yuan Sijun, despite making a 137 break. World number two Trump played his held-over qualifier in a waistcoat borrowed from Xiao Guodong after his luggage did not arrive in Fürth; he defeated Noppon Saengkham 5–2.

Li Hang, Chang Bingyu, and Lei Peifan were forced to withdraw from the tournament due to visa issues; their last-64 opponents, Zhao Xintong, Scott Donaldson, and Marco Fu, received byes to the last 32. Vafaei also had visa issues but did not formally withdraw from the tournament. After he failed to appear at the venue, his opponent Xiao was awarded a 5–0 win. Luca Brecel lost 1–5 in the last 64 to 18-year-old Chinese player Wu Yize, while Graeme Dott lost 4–5 to Zhou Yuelong and world number 18 Anthony McGill lost 2–5 to Si Jiahui.

The second round, featuring the remaining 32 players, was played on 18 August. Ali Carter defeated Stuart Bingham 5–4, after Bingham came from 1–4 behind to force a deciding frame. Trump defeated Andrew Higginson 5–3, while Shaun Murphy defeated Chris Wakelin by the same score to set up a last-16 meeting with Wilson, who defeated Jimmy Robertson 5–2. Mark Williams defeated his Welsh compatriot Dominic Dale 5–3, while Zhou Yuelong defeated Jack Lisowski 5–1. Yan Bingtao reached the last 16 by whitewashing Ricky Walden 5–0.

The third round consisted of the last 16 players and was contested on 19 August. Tied at 4–4 with Ajaib, Trump required foul points from snookers in the deciding frame. Ajaib went in-off whilst escaping from one of Trump's snookers, allowing Trump to win the match 5–4. Carter defeated David Grace, also in a deciding frame, while Wu beat Ryan Day 5–2. Wilson reached the quarter-finals with a 5–3 defeat of Murphy, while Si defeated Daniel Wells in a decider. Williams and Barry Hawkins reached the quarter-finals with 5–0 whitewash wins over Zhou and Robert Milkins respectively. Jamie Jones defeated Yan 5–3.

=== Later rounds ===
The quarter-finals were also played on 19 August. Williams defeated another Welsh compatriot Jones 5–1, making two centuries and three half-centuries in the match. Hawkins came from 2–3 behind against Trump to win three consecutive frames with breaks of 129, 110, and 92 for a 5–3 victory. It was the third successive time Hawkins had defeated Trump, following the 2021 Tour Championship and the 2022 Masters. Trump's quarter-final loss meant that O'Sullivan retained the world number one position; Trump had needed to reach the final to secure the top spot in the world rankings. In the other quarter-finals, Carter defeated Wu 5–3 while Wilson defeated Si 5–2.

The semi-finals were played on 20 August as the best-of-11 frames. Wilson moved into a 4–2 lead against Carter in their semi-final, winning two frames on re-spotted blacks. Carter then won three consecutive frames to lead 5–4, before Wilson made a 75 break to force a deciding frame, which he won to reach the 12th ranking final of his career. In the other semi-final, Hawkins and Williams were tied at 2–2 at the mid-session interval, but Hawkins then won four consecutive frames with breaks of 67, 89, 131, and 79 to clinch the match 6–2.

Hawkins and Wilson contested the best-of-17-frame final on 21 August. The two players had previously contested the final of the 2019 Paul Hunter Classic at the same venue, with Hawkins winning 4–3 on that occasion. Wilson took a 3–1 lead at the mid-session interval, and led 6–2 after the first session. He went on to win three of the four frames played in the evening session to clinch the match 9–3 and claim the fifth ranking title of his professional career. It was Hawkins's fourth consecutive loss in a ranking final. Both players commented that they had underperformed during the final. Runner-up Hawkins said he was "disappointed" and that the match had been a "struggle all day", whilst Wilson said "we both lost our timing today". In winning the event, Wilson progressed from eighth to sixth in the world snooker rankings.

== Main draw ==
The draw for the tournament is shown below. Numbers in brackets were players seedings, whilst players in bold denote match winners.

=== Top half ===
**Last 64**; Best of 9 frames
Michael Judge (IRL)	3
**Daniel Wells (WAL)**	**5**
**Gary Wilson (ENG) (32)**	**5**
Lukas Kleckers (GER)	2
Anthony McGill (SCO) (16)	2
**Si Jiahui (CHN)**	**5**
Hossein Vafaei (IRN) (17)	0
**Xiao Guodong (CHN) (Note: Hossein Vafaei did not arrive at the venue as a result of visa issues. However, he did not withdraw, so Xiao Guodong was awarded victory by default.)**	**5**
**Chris Wakelin (ENG)**	**5**
Oliver Brown (ENG)	3
Zhang Anda (CHN)	3
**Shaun Murphy (ENG) (9)**	**5**
Andy Hicks (ENG)	2
**Jimmy Robertson (ENG) (25)**	**5**
Lyu Haotian (CHN)	1
**Kyren Wilson (ENG) (8)**	**5**
**Scott Donaldson (SCO)**	**w/o**
Chang Bingyu (CHN)	w/d
**Ryan Day (WAL) (28)**	**5**
Steven Hallworth (ENG)	2
Luca Brecel (BEL) (12)	1
**Wu Yize (CHN)**	**5**
Haydon Pinhey (ENG)	2
**Rory McLeod (JAM)**	**5**
James Cahill (ENG)	2
**Ali Carter (ENG) (20)**	**5**
Ian Burns (ENG)	1
**Stuart Bingham (ENG) (13)**	**5**
**David Grace (ENG)**	**5**
Michael White (WAL)	2
**Jackson Page (WAL)**	**5**
Yuan Sijun (CHN)	1

**Last 32**; Best of 9 frames
**(Wales) Daniel Wells**	**5**
(England) Gary Wilson (32)	2
**(China) Si Jiahui**	**5**
(China) Xiao Guodong	3
(England) Chris Wakelin	3
**(England) Shaun Murphy (9)**	**5**
(England) Jimmy Robertson (25)	2
**(England) Kyren Wilson (8)**	**5**
(Scotland) Scott Donaldson	2
**(Wales) Ryan Day (28)**	**5**
**(China) Wu Yize**	**5**
(Jamaica) Rory McLeod	0
**(England) Ali Carter (20)**	**5**
(England) Stuart Bingham (13)	4
**(England) David Grace**	**5**
(Wales) Jackson Page	0

**Last 16**; Best of 9 frames
(Wales) Daniel Wells	4
**(China) Si Jiahui**	**5**
(England) Shaun Murphy (9)	3
**(England) Kyren Wilson (8)**	**5**
(Wales) Ryan Day (28)	2
**(China) Wu Yize**	**5**
**(England) Ali Carter (20)**	**5**
(England) David Grace	4

**Quarter-finals**; Best of 9 frames
(China) Si Jiahui	2
**(England) Kyren Wilson (8)**	**5**
(China) Wu Yize	3
**(England) Ali Carter (20)**	**5**

**Semi-finals**; Best of 11 frames
**(England) Kyren Wilson (8)**	**6**
(England) Ali Carter (20)	5

=== Bottom half ===
**Last 64**; Best of 9 frames
**Judd Trump (ENG) (3)**	**5**
Ashley Hugill (ENG)	3
Oliver Lines (ENG)	1
**Andrew Higginson (ENG)**	**5**
**Farakh Ajaib (PAK)**	**5**
Barry Pinches (ENG)	2
**Marco Fu (HKG)**	**w/o**
Lei Peifan (CHN)	w/d
**Stuart Carrington (ENG)**	**5**
Jordan Brown (NIR) (22)	3
Aaron Hill (IRL)	2
**Barry Hawkins (ENG) (11)**	**5**
Jak Jones (WAL)	2
**Robert Milkins (ENG) (27)**	**5**
Li Hang (CHN)	w/d
**Zhao Xintong (CHN)** (6)	**w/o**
**Mark Williams (WAL) (7)**	**5**
Sanderson Lam (ENG)	2
**Dominic Dale (WAL)**	**5**
Jimmy White (ENG)	3
**Jack Lisowski (ENG) (10)**	**5**
Matthew Stevens (WAL)	2
**Zhou Yuelong (CHN) (23)**	**5**
Graeme Dott (SCO)	4
Mitchell Mann (ENG)	1
**Ricky Walden (ENG) (18)**	**5**
Dylan Emery (WAL)	4
**Yan Bingtao (CHN) (15)**	**5**
Anthony Hamilton (ENG)	4
**Jamie Jones (WAL) (31)**	**5**
**Mark Joyce (ENG)**	**5**
Sean O'Sullivan (ENG)	2

**Last 32**; Best of 9 frames
**(England) Judd Trump (3)**	**5**
(England) Andrew Higginson	3
**(Pakistan) Farakh Ajaib**	**5**
(Hong Kong) Marco Fu	3
(England) Stuart Carrington	1
**(England) Barry Hawkins (11)**	**5**
**(England) Robert Milkins (27)**	**5**
(China) Zhao Xintong (6)	4
**(Wales) Mark Williams (7)**	**5**
(Wales) Dominic Dale	3
(England) Jack Lisowski (10)	1
**(China) Zhou Yuelong (23)**	**5**
(England) Ricky Walden (18)	0
**(China) Yan Bingtao (15)**	**5**
**(Wales) Jamie Jones (31)**	**5**
(England) Mark Joyce	1

**Last 16**; Best of 9 frames
**(England) Judd Trump (3)**	**5**
(Pakistan) Farakh Ajaib	4
**(England) Barry Hawkins (11)**	**5**
(England) Robert Milkins (27)	0
**(Wales) Mark Williams (7)**	**5**
(China) Zhou Yuelong (23)	0
(China) Yan Bingtao (15)	3
**(Wales) Jamie Jones (31)**	**5**

**Quarter-finals**; Best of 9 frames
(England) Judd Trump (3)	3
**(England) Barry Hawkins (11)**	**5**
**(Wales) Mark Williams (7)**	**5**
(Wales) Jamie Jones (31)	1

**Semi-finals**; Best of 11 frames
**(England) Barry Hawkins (11)**	**6**
(Wales) Mark Williams (7)	2

=== Final ===
Final: Best of 17 frames. Referee: Terry Camilleri; Stadthalle Fürth, Fürth, Germany, 21 August 2022
**Kyren Wilson** (8); England	**9**–3	Barry Hawkins (11); England
Afternoon: **66**–17, **63**–56, **70**–32, 54–**68**, 7–**104**, **73**–9, **79**–17, **75**–0; Evening: **69**–64, 33–**59**, **83**–27, **77**–30
56	Highest break	**64**
0	Century breaks	0

== Qualifying ==
Qualifying for the event took place between 15 and 17, and 22 and 24 July 2022 at the Morningside Arena in Leicester, England. Matches involving the defending champion and the top three ranked players were held over and played at the Stadthalle Fürth in Fürth. Ronnie O'Sullivan was originally due to have his match against Sean O'Sullivan held-over but withdrew from the event. The match was still held over as he was replaced by Luke Simmonds.

- Fan Zhengyi (1) (CHN) 1–5 Michael Judge (IRL) (Note: Match held over and played in Fürth.)
- Daniel Wells (WAL) 5–3 Peter Lines (ENG)
- Gary Wilson (32) (ENG) 5–1 Duane Jones (WAL)
- Lukas Kleckers (GER) 5–2 Ryan Thomerson (AUS)
- Anthony McGill (16) (SCO) 5–4 Alexander Ursenbacher (SUI)
- Tian Pengfei (CHN) 3–5 Si Jiahui (CHN)
- Hossein Vafaei (17) (IRN) 5–1 Ng On-yee (HKG)
- Xiao Guodong (CHN) 5–4 Xu Si (CHN)
- Chris Wakelin (ENG) 5–4 Jamie Clarke (WAL)
- Stephen Maguire (24) (SCO) 4–5 Oliver Brown (ENG)
- Anton Kazakov (UKR) 1–5 Zhang Anda (CHN)
- Shaun Murphy (9) (ENG) 5–3 Dean Young (SCO)
- Zak Surety (ENG) 2–5 Andy Hicks (ENG)
- Jimmy Robertson (25) (ENG) 5–4 Zhao Jianbo (CHN)
- Ross Muir (SCO) 1–5 Lyu Haotian (CHN)
- Kyren Wilson (8) (ENG) 5–2 Sam Craigie (ENG)
- John Higgins (5) (SCO) 3–5 Scott Donaldson (SCO)
- Ian Martin (ENG) 1–5 Chang Bingyu (CHN)
- Ryan Day (28) (WAL) 5–3 Ken Doherty (IRL)
- Robbie Williams (ENG) 3–5 Steven Hallworth (ENG)
- Luca Brecel (12) (BEL) 5–1 Andy Lee (HKG)
- Wu Yize (CHN) 5–3 Jenson Kendrick (ENG)
- Matthew Selt (21) (ENG) 1–5 Haydon Pinhey (ENG)
- Rory McLeod (JAM) 5–4 Elliot Slessor (ENG)
- Adam Duffy (ENG) 1–5 James Cahill (ENG)
- Ali Carter (20) (ENG) 5–0 Reanne Evans (ENG)
- Andres Petrov (EST) 3–5 Ian Burns (ENG)
- Stuart Bingham (13) (ENG) 5–3 Michael Holt (ENG)
- David Grace (ENG) 5–2 Ben Mertens (BEL)
- Martin Gould (29) (ENG) 0–5 Michael White (WAL)
- Hammad Miah (ENG) 4–5 Jackson Page (WAL)
- Mark Selby (4) (ENG) 2–5 Yuan Sijun (CHN)
- Judd Trump (3) (ENG) 5–2 Noppon Saengkham (THA)
- Ashley Hugill (ENG) 5–1 Julien Leclercq (BEL)
- Tom Ford (30) (ENG) 3–5 Oliver Lines (ENG)
- Andrew Higginson (ENG) 5–2 Joe O'Connor (ENG)
- Mark Allen (14) (NIR) 3–5 Farakh Ajaib (PAK)
- Barry Pinches (ENG) 5–1 Rebecca Kenna (ENG)
- David Gilbert (19) (ENG) 1–5 Marco Fu (HKG)
- Lei Peifan (CHN) 5–0 Rod Lawler (ENG)
- David Lilley (ENG) 2–5 Stuart Carrington (ENG)
- Jordan Brown (22) (NIR) 5–4 Cao Yupeng (CHN)
- Chen Zifan (CHN) 1–5 Aaron Hill (IRL)
- Barry Hawkins (11) (ENG) 5–1 Gerard Greene (NIR)
- Ben Woollaston (ENG) 3–5 Jak Jones (WAL)
- Robert Milkins (27) (ENG) 5–0 Lu Ning (CHN)
- Craig Steadman (ENG) 3–5 Li Hang (CHN)
- Zhao Xintong (6) (CHN) 5–2 Fraser Patrick (SCO)
- Mark Williams (7) (WAL) 5–4 Liam Highfield (ENG)
- Louis Heathcote (ENG) 4–5 Sanderson Lam (ENG)
- Joe Perry (26) (ENG) 3–5 Dominic Dale (WAL)
- Jimmy White (ENG) 5–4 Andrew Pagett (WAL)
- Jack Lisowski (10) (ENG) 5–1 Zhang Jiankang (CHN)
- Florian Nüßle (AUT) 4–5 Matthew Stevens (WAL)
- Zhou Yuelong (23) (CHN) 5–4 John Astley (ENG)
- Graeme Dott (SCO) 5–0 Thepchaiya Un-Nooh (THA)
- Mitchell Mann (ENG) 5–1 Nutcharut Wongharuthai (THA)
- Ricky Walden (18) (ENG) 5–1 Alfie Burden (ENG)
- Peng Yisong (CHN) 1–5 Dylan Emery (WAL)
- Yan Bingtao (15) (CHN) 5–2 Pang Junxu (CHN)
- Anthony Hamilton (ENG) 5–2 Mark King (ENG)
- Jamie Jones (31) (WAL) 5–2 Mark Davis (ENG)
- Mark Joyce (ENG) 5–0 Stephen Hendry (SCO)
- Luke Simmonds (ENG) 2–5 Sean O'Sullivan (ENG)

== Century breaks ==
=== Main stage centuries ===
49 century breaks were made during the main stage of the tournament. Zhang made the highest break of the event, a 143 in frame seven of his second round match with Murphy.

- 143 – Zhang Anda
- 137 – Mark Selby
- 136, 117 – Stuart Bingham
- 136 – Jimmy Robertson
- 135, 123, 103, 100 – Mark Williams
- 134, 132, 131, 129, 114, 110, 104, 100 – Barry Hawkins
- 134, 104, 102 – Ryan Day
- 128, 120, 103, 102, 100 – Ali Carter
- 128, 102 – Jamie Jones
- 120, 104 – David Grace
- 118, 103, 102 – Judd Trump
- 117 – Oliver Lines
- 117 – Anthony McGill
- 113 – Si Jiahui
- 112 – Chris Wakelin
- 111, 101, 101, 100 – Kyren Wilson
- 109, 108, 101 – Wu Yize
- 106 – Zhou Yuelong
- 104 – Sean O'Sullivan
- 103 – Noppon Saengkham
- 102 – Jak Jones
- 102 – Yan Bingtao
- 100 – Michael Judge

=== Qualifying stage centuries ===
A total of 32 century breaks were made during the qualifying stage of the tournament. Both Vafaei and Zhang made maximum breaks for the first time in their careers during qualification.

- 147 – Hossein Vafaei
- 147 – Zhang Anda
- 138 – Barry Pinches
- 137 – Lyu Haotian
- 136 – Jack Lisowski
- 135 – Ryan Day
- 134 – Jamie Jones
- 133 – Jimmy White
- 132 – Zhao Xintong
- 130 – Jamie Clarke
- 126 – Tom Ford
- 123 – Chris Wakelin
- 118 – Andrew Higginson
- 115, 106, 103, 103 – Xiao Guodong
- 115 – Jordan Brown
- 115 – Marco Fu
- 110, 100 – Li Hang
- 107, 105 – Stephen Maguire
- 106 – Barry Hawkins
- 105 – Mark Williams
- 103 – Gerard Greene
- 102 – Aaron Hill
- 102 – Florian Nüßle
- 101 – John Higgins
- 101 – Zhou Yuelong
- 100 – Liam Highfield
- 100 – Kyren Wilson
