= Barry Hawkins =

English snooker player (born 1979)

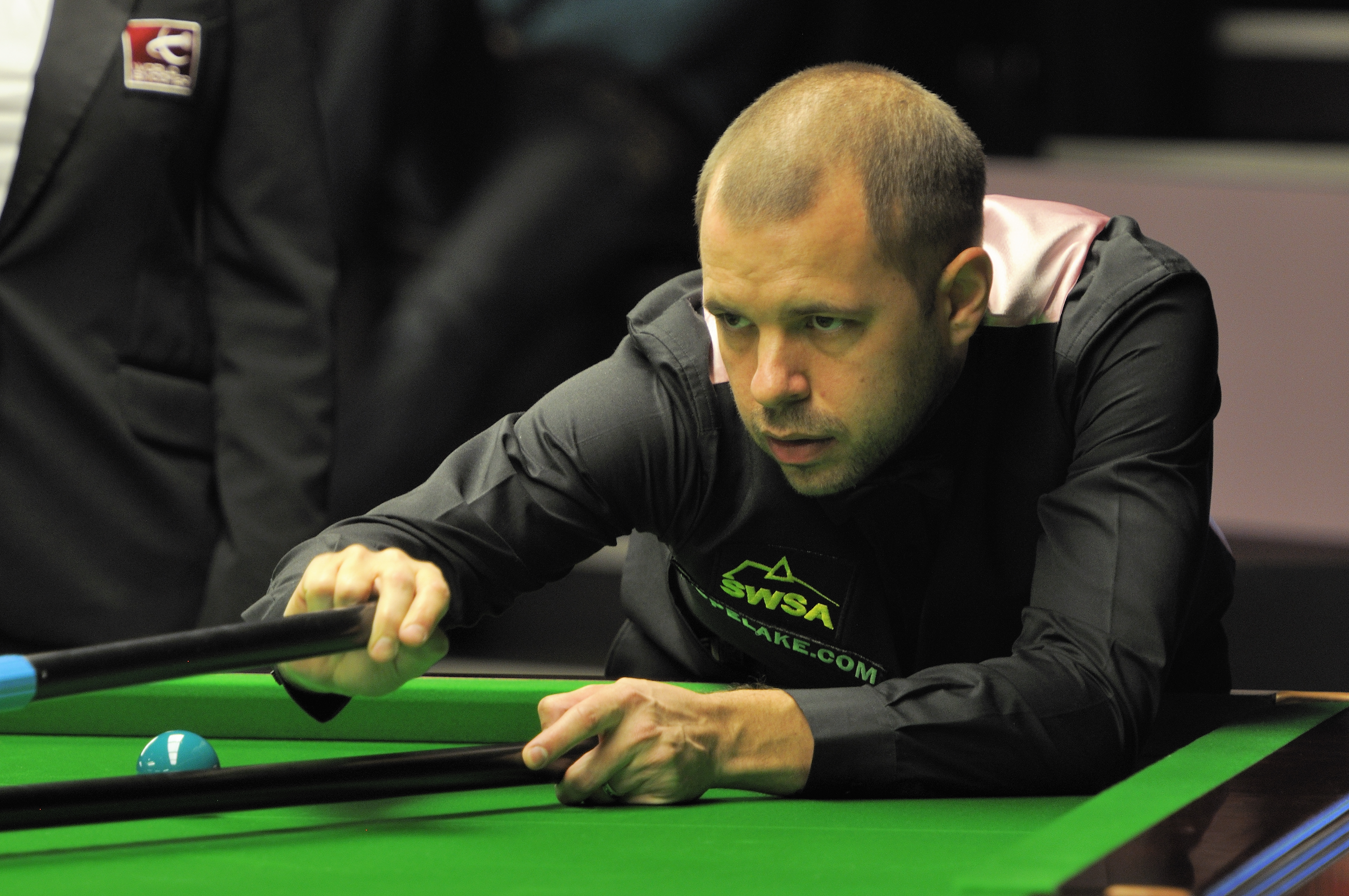
- Hawkins at the 2014 German Masters

Personal information
- Nickname: The Hawk
- Born: 23 April 1979 (age 47) Ditton, Kent, England

Sport
- Country: England
- Sport: Snooker
- Professional: 1996/1997, 2000–present
- Highest ranking: 4 (March–July 2014)
- Current ranking: 10 (as of 7 November 2026)
- Maximum breaks: 3
- Century breaks: 534 (as of 19 November 2026)

Tournament wins
- Ranking: 5
- Minor-ranking: 1

Barry Hawkins (born 23 April 1979) is an English professional snooker player from Ditton, Kent. He turned professional in 1996, but only rose to prominence in the 2004–05 snooker season when he reached the last 16 of the 2004 UK Championship, the quarter-finals of the 2004 British Open and the semi-finals of the 2005 Welsh Open. He has spent twenty successive seasons ranked inside the top 32. Hawkins reached his first ranking final and won his first ranking title at the 2012 Australian Goldfields Open. Hawkins has played in 13 ranking finals and won five ranking titles.

Hawkins played in the televised stages of every World Championship between his Crucible Theatre debut in 2006 and his failure to qualify in 2023. He lost in the first round on his first five appearances but reached the second round in 2011 and 2012. Rated an 80–1 outsider for the 2013 World Snooker Championship, he reached the final. Hawkins has since reached the semi-finals of the World Championship in 2014, 2015, 2017 and 2018. He was runner-up in the Masters in 2016 and 2022 and in the UK Championship of 2024.

== Career ==
=== Early career ===
Hawkins was born in Ditton, Kent. Before taking up snooker professionally, he was an office clerk.

He reached the Top 32 in the rankings in 2004/2005, having reached the semi-finals of the 2005 Welsh Open, as well as the last sixteen of three other tournaments.

=== 2005/2006 ===
In 2005/2006, he reached the semi-finals of the Grand Prix and the Welsh Open again, and also beat Ding Junhui to qualify for the World Championship for the first time. This cemented Hawkins' place in the Top 16 of the rankings for the 2006/2007 season.

At the World Championship in Sheffield, however, Hawkins faced former champion Ken Doherty in the first round but lost 1–10. He told the BBC that "I just couldn't perform and I don't know why ... I'm gutted after such a good season to have performed like that."

=== 2006–2009 ===
The 2006–07 season was less successful for Hawkins. Although he reached the final of the non-ranking Kilkenny Irish Masters, his only run past the last 16 in a ranking event was at the China Open, when he reached the semi-finals. In their last four match, Jamie Cope was able to obtain the snookers he needed to stay in the match and went on to win 5–6, denying Hawkins a place in the final. A first-round defeat by Fergal O'Brien at the World Championship cost him his Top 16 place and left him outside the Top 32 on the single-year rankings.

Early in the 2007–08 season, Hawkins won the qualifying tournament for the 2008 Masters, beating Kurt Maflin. He also reached the last 16 at the Grand Prix, UK Championship and China Open.

He started the 2008–09 season with a quarter-final appearance at the 2008 Northern Ireland Trophy, by beating Jimmy White, Marco Fu and Ryan Day where he played O'Sullivan, losing 4–5 after levelling from 1–4 down. He then won at least his opening match in the next four ranking events, reaching the provisional top 16. He did not qualify for the events in Wales and China, but made it to the World Championship by beating Daniel Wells 10–9, but lost in the first round, finishing one place short of a return to the top 16.

From 2006 to 2010, Hawkins's record at the World Championship was unsuccessful, with a win–loss record of 0–5. As well as the aforementioned one-sided defeat by Doherty, Hawkins narrowly lost in the first round the following two years as well, to Fergal O'Brien and Ali Carter respectively in final frame deciders. In 2009 Hawkins missed out on a chance to take his match with former champion Graeme Dott to a deciding frame and lost 8–10. The following year, Hawkins led defending champion John Higgins 3–5 before Higgins won seven of the next eight frames to progress.

=== 2010/2011 ===
Hawkins played well at the World Open (formerly the Grand Prix) in defeating Mark Selby as well as former World Champion Ken Doherty before losing 2–4 to Mark Williams.

Hawkins qualified for the World Championship for the sixth year running, where he was drawn against Stephen Maguire in the first round. Having never won a match at the Crucible before, Hawkins led Maguire 4–0, 6–2 and 8–4 before seeing Maguire level the match at 8–8 and then 9–9. However, Hawkins held his nerve in the deciding frame to finally end his losing run at the World Championship. In the second round, Hawkins was defeated 12–13 by Mark Allen.

=== 2011/2012 ===
Hawkins reached the PTC Finals in the 2011–12 season largely thanks to semi-final runs in Event 3 and Event 5. He finished 22nd on the Order of Merit, inside the top 24 who qualified. In the Finals he lost in the first round 3–4 to Jack Lisowski. Hawkins won the non-ranking Snooker Shoot-Out, a tournament where the winner of each round is determined by a single 10-minute frame. He beat Graeme Dott in the final and picked up a cheque for £32,000, the biggest of his career to date.

Hawkins' best run in a 2011‍–‍12 season ranking event came at the 2012 World Snooker Championship. He qualified by beating David Morris and was drawn to play world number one Selby. whom Hawkins beat 10–3 to face Matthew Stevens in the second round. Hawkins led 8–6 after two sessions in a bid to reach his first quarter-final at the Crucible, but had no answer to his opponent in the latter stages, as Stevens won seven of the last 10 frames to take the match 11–13. Hawkins finished the season ranked world number 22.

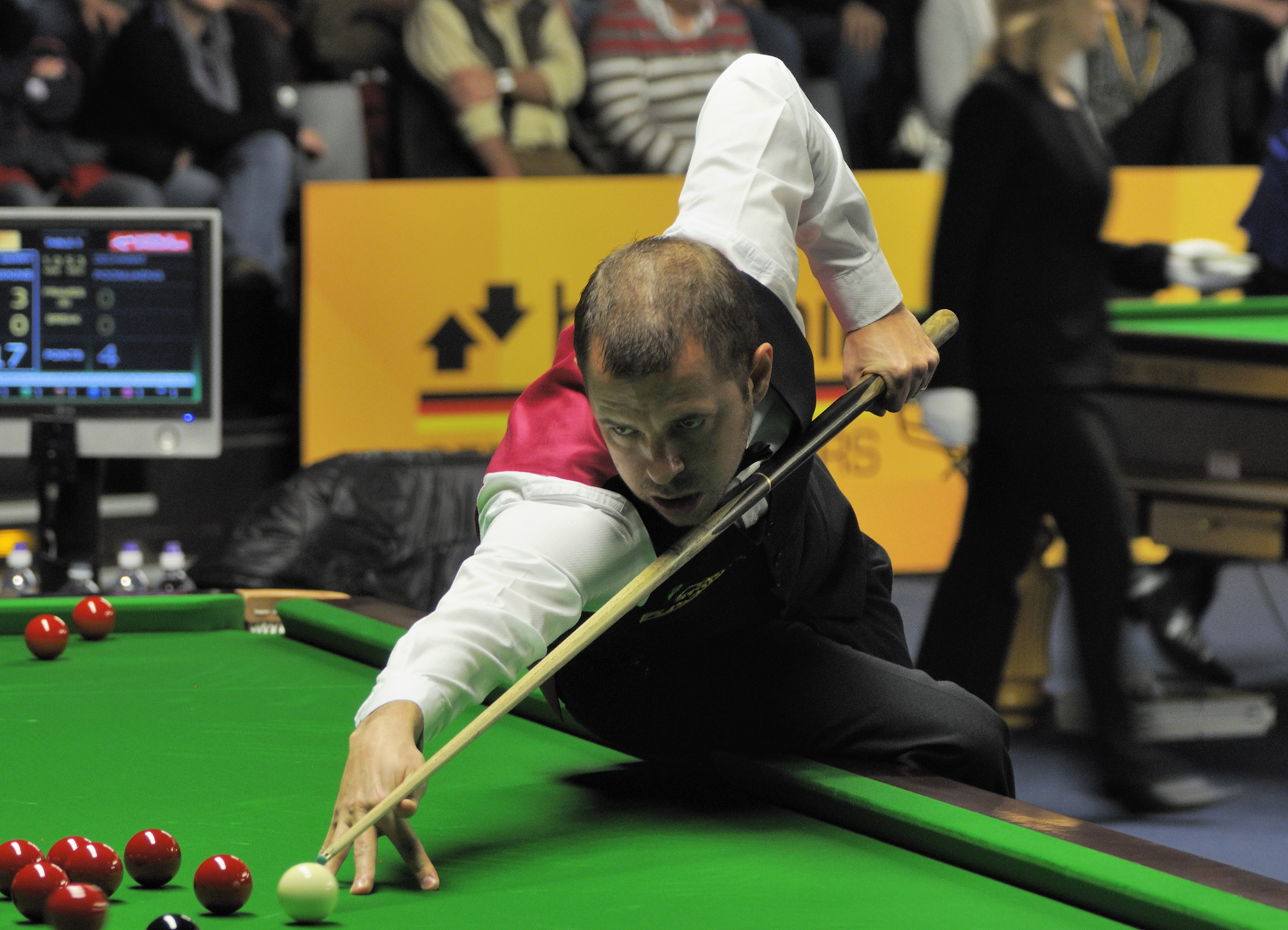
Hawkins playing at German Masters 2013.

=== 2012/2013 ===
Hawkins began the 2012–13 season at the Wuxi Classic, where he faced Selby in the first round once more, this time losing 2–5.

==== First ranking title ====
His next ranking event was the Australian Goldfields Open in Bendigo, where he defeated Xiao Guodong (5–1), Matthew Stevens (5–2), Matthew Selt (5–3) and Mark Davis (6–4) to reach the first ranking event final of his 16-year professional career. He faced Peter Ebdon and finished the first session of the match leading 5–3, which included a spell of four successive frames that meant Ebdon had not potted a ball for over an hour. In the evening session Hawkins won all four frames played to take the title with a 9–3 victory. He made three centuries in the final and climbed to world number 20 thanks to the win, as well as earning praise from Ebdon himself.

==== Other tournaments ====
Despite then losing in the first round of the Shanghai Masters and in qualifying for the International Championship, Hawkins climbed into the top 16 in November meaning he would be in the main draw in the Masters for the first time since 2007. Neil Robertson beat him 2–6 in the UK Championship and in the Masters he was 5–4 up against Judd Trump but missed two pots when well placed to win the match and instead went on to lose 5–6, a result which left Hawkins "devastated". He bounced back at the next ranking event, the German Masters, by beating Selby to reach the semi-finals. He then lost 4–6 to Marco Fu in a long match which finished after midnight local time and included a bout of safety which lasted almost an hour. Hawkins failed to get past the second round in the World Open, China Open or the Welsh Open.

==== World Championship final ====
In his opening match at the World Championship, he triumphed over Jack Lisowski 10–3 win to set up a second round meeting with Selby. Hawkins trailed 7–9 to the world number one after the second session but came back to triumph 13–10 in a win he described as the best of his career. In his first World Championship quarter-final he defeated Ding Junhui 13–7 to progress to the semi-finals, where he played Ricky Walden. Hawkins fell 8–12 behind before winning eight successive frames with two centuries in the process. Despite a brief fightback from Walden, Hawkins won the match 17–14 to set up a clash in the final with defending champion O'Sullivan. Hawkins fought hard during the final making breaks of 127 and 133, his highest ever at the Crucible, but O'Sullivan defeated Hawkins 12–18. For reaching the final he received prize money of £125,000.

Hawkins' turnaround from being a solid player to a ranking event winner and World Championship runner-up has been credited, in part, to his work with 1979 champion Terry Griffiths who helped to give him the self-belief to make the most of his game. His successful season saw him climb 13 spots in the rankings to a career high world number nine, the first time he finished a season inside the top 16 since 2006.

=== 2013/2014 ===
After a pair of second-round exits in the opening two rankings events of the 2013–14 season, Hawkins beat Selby at the Shanghai Masters to reach the semi-finals. In the last four he was outplayed by Ding Junhui, exiting 2–6. In a deciding frame against Shaun Murphy at the 2013 UK Championship, Hawkins potted seven reds and seven blacks but had to make do with a break of 70 to take the match and reach the quarter-finals for the first in his career. Hawkins led Selby 5–3 in their semi-final, but went on to be beaten 5–6.

==== Second ranking title ====
Hawkins played in all eight European Tour events during the season with his best result being a semi-final defeat at the Bulgarian Open, which helped him finish 25th on the Order of Merit and claim a spot for the Finals. At the finals, he whitewashed Stephen Maguire in the first round and then defeated Ryan Day. Victories over Yu Delu and Judd Trump followed as he reached the final. He faced practice partner Gerard Greene and completed a 4–0 win to take the £100,000 first prize.

At the World Championship, Hawkins played Ricky Walden in the second round and fought back from a 5–9 deficit to win 13–11. He built an 11–5 lead over Dominic Dale in their quarter-final, but Dale then won seven frames in a row to stand one away from equalling the biggest comeback in a quarter-final at the Crucible. However, Hawkins then made breaks of 66 and 65 to win the last two frames and move into the semi-finals, where he faced O'Sullivan in a rematch of the previous year's final. Hawkins trailed 2–6 after the first session and 5–11 after the second session, and lost the match 7–17 with a session to spare. Hawkins was the world number five at the end of the campaign, the highest position at which he had ever finished a season.

=== 2014/2015 ===
Hawkins first ranking event of the 2014–15 season was the 2014 Wuxi Classic and he beat Marco Fu 5–4 to reach the semi-finals, stating later that he was gaining more self belief due to being in the latter stages of big events more regularly. At 3–3 in their last-four encounter, Neil Robertson took the next three frames to defeat Hawkins 3–6. However, he was unable to build on his good start to the season: he could not advance beyond the last 32 of the next three ranking events, and in the second round of the UK Championship he lost 5–8 to Nigel Bond after having been 5–0 up.

In January 2015, he achieved the second maximum break of his career in his league stage match against Stephen Maguire in group 1 of the Championship League. His form in ranking events did not improve though as he was knocked out in the first round of the German Masters and PTC Grand Final. An improvement came at the China Open where he reached the quarter-finals but was ousted 3–5 by Gary Wilson.

Hawkins looked to be cruising into the second round of the 2015 World Snooker Championship after he took a 9–4 lead against Selt. However, Selt won five frames on the trot to take the match into a deciding frame which Hawkins won. Hawkins produced a comeback in the next round against Mark Allen by winning five frames in a row to triumph 13–11 and stated that the unique atmosphere of the Crucible Theatre helps him focus harder and is the reason for his recent good form in the event. In the quarter-finals, Hawkins won six frames from 1–3 behind, restricting his opponent Neil Robertson to just eight points in the process. The tie would eventually go into a deciding frame which Hawkins won with a 61 break to reach the semi-finals for the third year in a row. It was a high quality encounter, during which both players made four centuries each to equal a World Championship record for a best of 25 frame match. Hawkins endured a tough semi-final as he fell 3–14 behind Shaun Murphy and only just avoided losing with a session to spare, as he returned to be defeated 9–17.

=== 2015/2016 ===
Hawkins took two months off at the beginning of the season and said he would be more selective with the events he entered, in order to remain fresh for the entire year. He returned for the minor-ranking Riga Open and won it by defeating Tom Ford 4–1 in the final. Hawkins conceded only a total of seven frames in his seven matches during the event. A series of early ranking event exits followed, but Hawkins recaptured his form at the Masters. In an event in which he had never won a match in five prior appearances, Hawkins eliminated Joe Perry 6–3, Mark Allen 6–2 and Judd Trump 6–4 to set up a meeting with O'Sullivan in the final. Hawkins took the opening frame but lost 1–10, equalling the record of the biggest margin of defeat in a Masters final (set by Steve Davis's 9–0 whitewash of Mike Hallett in 1988). In the PTC Finals, Hawkins lost 3–6 to Ricky Walden in the semi-finals.

Hawkins met O'Sullivan in the second round of the 2016 World Snooker Championship, a player whom he had not beaten in 10 attempts stretching back 14 years. Hawkins led 9–7 after the second session and 12–9 to stand one frame from the win. O'Sullivan levelled the match at 12–12, but Hawkins clinched the deciding frame to be the only player to have reached the quarter-finals of the event for the past three years. Hawkins said the change from his heavy defeat to O'Sullivan at the Masters in January to beating him, was playing the balls instead of his opponent, and that he was proud of having handled the most pressure he ever felt during his career. In the next round, Hawkins fell 1–9 behind to Marco Fu, but he fought back 9–10 before losing 11–13. Afterwards, Hawkins said he had not slept at all after his win over O'Sullivan and was unable to focus during the first session of the Fu match.

=== 2016/2017 ===
In the 2016–17 season, Hawkins reached the semi-finals of the English Open, where he lost 2–6 to Judd Trump. The next Home Nations event was the Northern Ireland Open and Hawkins won through to the final by beating Anthony Hamilton in the last four. Hawkins led 5–1 against Mark King, but King fought back and sealed an 8–9 victory. In the second round of the UK Championship, Fergal O'Brien became the first player to make five centuries in a best-of-11 frame match as he edged out Hawkins 5–6. Hawkins advanced to the semi-finals of the 2017 Masters. He had a 5–2 advantage in his match against Joe Perry, before Perry secured the snooker he needed to reduce the lead to 5–3. Perry went on to win the three remaining frames, clinching the match 5–6. Hawkins beat Kyren Wilson, Judd Trump, Neil Robertson and Liang Wenbo to reach the final of the World Grand Prix. He then made five century breaks in his 10–7 victory over Ryan Day, winning his third ranking title and earning £100,000 in prize money. Victories over Tom Ford, Graeme Dott and Stephen Maguire saw Hawkins play in his fourth World Championship semi-final in five years, but he was comprehensively beaten by John Higgins 8–17.

=== 2017–2021 ===
In December 2017, Hawkins advanced to the third round of the UK Championship but was knocked out by Sunny Akani after suffering a 0–6 defeat. After the match, Hawkins said that he was "in a state of shock" for his performance. Hawkins was defeated by Kyren Wilson in the first round of the 2018 Masters 4–6. In March, Hawkins reached the final of the Welsh Open where he faced John Higgins. Despite making three centuries, he eventually lost 7–9. In April, Hawkins reached another ranking final, this time he faced Mark Selby at the China Open. Selby, the defending champion, proved to be too strong for Hawkins, who lost 3–11. In May, Hawkins furthered his good record at the Crucible, after beating Stuart Carrington, Lyu Haotian and Ding Junhui, he reached the semi-finals at the 2018 World Snooker Championship and faced Mark Williams. The match was a tight encounter, with a total of 20 breaks over 50 between the two players, Williams eventually won 15–17.

In September 2018, Hawkins reached the final of the invitational Shanghai Masters after victories against Stephen Maguire, Williams and Ding, setting up a final with defending champion Ronnie O'Sullivan. After leading 6–4 at the end of the morning session, Hawkins eventually lost 9–11. In December, Hawkins was knocked out of the UK Championship in the last 16 after losing 2–6 to Kyren Wilson. At the 2019 Masters, Hawkins advanced to the quarter-final after beating Shaun Murphy 6–2 in the first round, but he was then defeated by Neil Robertson in his next match, losing 3–6. Hawkins reached the second round of the 2019 World Snooker Championship after outplaying Li Hang in a 10–1 win, His next opponent was Kyren Wilson, and the two players produced a total of nine centuries during the match, but after leading 4–0, 6–2 and 9–5, Hawkins eventually lost 11–13.

In August 2019, Hawkins won the invitational Paul Hunter Classic after defeating Kyren Wilson 4–3 in the final. At the 2019 UK Championship, Hawkins made his third career maximum break in his 6-2 first round victory against Gerard Greene. Hawkins was unable to progress further however, as he suffered a 4–6 defeat in the next round against Alan McManus, despite leading 4–1. In January 2020, Hawkins had an early exit at the Masters, losing 1–6 to Higgins in the first round. In August 2020, Hawkins faced Alexander Ursenbacher in the first round of the World Snooker Championship, in which he comfortably won 10–2, but he then lost 9–13 to Neil Robertson in the next round.

At the 2020 UK Championship, Hawkins advanced to the last 16 but was knocked out of the tournament after losing 3–6 to Selby. In January 2021, Hawkins did not participate in the Masters, but he did reach the semi-finals of the German Masters at the end of the month, his first appearance in the last four of a ranking event since 2019. Despite leading 5–1 against Judd Trump, Hawkins lost five straight frames and was defeated 5–6. In February, he reached another semi final, this time at the Players Championship, but he lost 4–6 to O'Sullivan after taking a 3–0 lead. Hawkins qualified for the 2021 Tour Championship and beat Trump 10–7 to reach the semi-finals. There, he took a 9–6 lead against O'Sullivan, but would ultimately lose 9–10. Hawkins exited 10–13 in the second round of the World Championship to Kyren Wilson.

=== 2021–2026 ===
Hawkins reached the semi-finals of the UK Championship for the first time, losing 1–6 to eventual winner Zhao Xintong. The result was Hawkins' 20th defeat in 27 career ranking event semi-finals. At the second Triple Crown event of the season, the 2022 Masters, he defeated world champion Mark Selby and came back from 4–5 down against Judd Trump to win 6–5, reaching the final of the event for the second time. He was outplayed in the final, losing to Neil Robertson 4–10. Hawkins also reached the final of the Players Championship where he was the lowest seed, but lost to Robertson again by a 5–10 scoreline. He failed to progress past the first round of the World Championship for the first time since 2010, losing 7–10 to Crucible debutant Jackson Page.

In the 2022–23 season, Hawkins reached the final of the European Masters, which included a 5–3 win over Trump in the quarter-finals, and a 6–2 victory over Mark Williams in the semi-finals. He then lost 3–9 to Kyren Wilson in the final. At the 2022 UK Championship, Hawkins lost 3–6 in the last 32 to Ding Junhui. Hawkins produced a strong performance in the opening round of the 2023 Masters where he whitewashed Mark Allen 6–0. However, he would go on to suffer a 5–6 defeat to Judd Trump in the quarter-finals. Hawkins lost his position in the top 16 of the rankings, and as a result he had to go through qualifying for the 2023 World Snooker Championship, in which he lost a close contest with Jak Jones 8–10. His failure to qualify meant that he missed out on an appearance at the Crucible for the first time since 2006.

Hawkins made a strong start to the 2023–24 season by reaching the final of the European Masters. Hawkins beat reigning world champion Luca Brecel and Selby en route to the final, in which he faced Trump. Hawkins prevailed with a 9–6 victory for his fourth ranking title, and his first in over six years. Afterwards, Hawkins said "It's been a long time coming. I was at a stage where I didn't think I'd ever win a tournament again". Hawkins later reached the semi-final of the 2023 Northern Ireland Open, but lost to Judd Trump 4–6 after Trump won five consecutive frames to come back from three frames behind. Hawkins reached the quarter-finals of the 2024 Masters but was knocked out of the tournament by O'Sullivan 3–6. At the 2024 World Championship, Hawkins was defeated in the first round by Ryan Day 8–10.

Hawkins knocked out defending champion O'Sullivan 6–4 in the first round at the 2024 UK Championship before progressing to the semi-finals. He beat Allen 6‍–‍5 in the last four to reach the UK Championship final for the first time in his career. In the final he was defeated 8–10 by Trump. Hawkins was drawn against Trump again in the first round of the 2025 Masters, losing heavily this time 1‍–‍6. In February, Hawkins finished runner up at the 2025 German Masters, losing to Kyren Wilson 9–10 in the final. Hawkins exited the 2025 World Championship in the first round, losing 9–10 to Hossein Vafaei.

At the 2026 Welsh Open, Hawkins defeated Lisowski 9‍–‍5 to win his first ranking-event title for three years. Hawkins reached the quarter-finals at the 2026 World Championship, where he suffered an 11–13 defeat to Allen.

== Personal life ==
Hawkins has been with his partner Tara since 2001; in January 2009 they had a son together. The couple were married in June 2012.

== Performance and rankings timeline ==
Tournament	1996/ 97	1997/ 98	1998/ 99	1999/ 00	2000/ 01	2001/ 02	2002/ 03	2003/ 04	2004/ 05	2005/ 06	2006/ 07	2007/ 08	2008/ 09	2009/ 10	2010/ 11	2011/ 12	2012/ 13	2013/ 14	2014/ 15	2015/ 16	2016/ 17	2017/ 18	2018/ 19	2019/ 20		2020/ 21	2021/ 22	2022/ 23	2023/ 24	2024/ 25	2025/ 26	2026/ 27
Ranking (Note: It shows the ranking at the beginning of the season)	(Note: New players on the Main Tour don't have a ranking)	(Note: He was an amateur)				85	51	42	43	30	12	19	27	17	21	22	22	9	5	8	14	6	7	9		17	13	11	19	15	9	10
Ranking tournaments
Championship League	Tournament Not Held											Non-Ranking Event														2R	2R	RR	RR	A	RR	A
China Open (Note: The event was called the China International (1997/1998–1998/1999))	NH	NR	A	A	LQ	LQ	Not Held		LQ	1R	SF	2R	LQ	1R	1R	1R	2R	WD	QF	1R	LQ	F	1R	Tournament Not Held								1R
Wuhan Open	Tournament Not Held																												3R	3R	3R	2R
British Open	LQ	A	A	A	LQ	LQ	LQ	1R	QF	Tournament Not Held																	1R	2R	3R	LQ	3R	1R
English Open	Tournament Not Held																				SF	2R	3R	4R		4R	2R	3R	1R	QF	3R	3R
Shenzhen Open (Note: The event was called the Xi'an Grand Prix (2024/2025–2025/2026))	Tournament Not Held																													QF	3R	1R
Northern Ireland Open	Tournament Not Held																				F	1R	1R	4R		2R	1R	2R	SF	3R	2R	1R
International Championship	Tournament Not Held																LQ	2R	2R	2R	LQ	1R	2R	1R		Not Held			QF	3R	QF	WD
UK Championship	LQ	A	A	A	LQ	LQ	LQ	1R	3R	2R	2R	2R	1R	LQ	1R	LQ	2R	QF	2R	2R	2R	3R	4R	2R		4R	SF	1R	2R	F	QF	
Shoot Out	Tournament Not Held														Non-ranking Event						2R	4R	2R	3R		2R	2R	1R	A	WD	A	
Scottish Open (Note: The event was called the International Open (1996/1997) and the Players Championship (2003/2004))	LQ	A	A	A	LQ	3R	LQ	LQ	Tournament Not Held								MR	Not Held			4R	1R	1R	1R		4R	LQ	2R	LQ	3R	1R	
German Masters (Note: The event was called the German Open (1996/1997–1997/1998))	LQ	A	NR	Tournament Not Held											LQ	1R	SF	2R	1R	2R	QF	1R	1R	LQ		SF	LQ	LQ	1R	F	1R	
Welsh Open	LQ	A	A	A	LQ	LQ	1R	1R	SF	SF	2R	1R	LQ	2R	1R	1R	1R	SF	2R	4R	QF	F	3R	2R		4R	2R	2R	2R	1R	W	
World Grand Prix	Tournament Not Held																		NR	1R	W	DNQ	SF	1R		2R	1R	1R	1R	2R	2R	
Players Championship (Note: The event was called the Players Tour Championship Grand Final (2010/2011–2015/2016))	Tournament Not Held														DNQ	1R	2R	W	1R	SF	1R	DNQ	1R	DNQ		SF	F	DNQ	1R	1R	1R	
World Open (Note: The event was called the Grand Prix (1996/1997–2000/2001 and 2004/2005–2009/2010) and the LG Cup (2001/2002–2003/2004))	LQ	A	A	A	LQ	QF	LQ	3R	2R	SF	RR	2R	1R	LQ	2R	1R	2R	2R	Not Held		2R	1R	SF	2R		Not Held			QF	QF	WD	
Tour Championship	Tournament Not Held																						DNQ	DNQ		SF	DNQ	DNQ	1R	SF	QF	
World Championship	LQ	LQ	LQ	LQ	LQ	LQ	LQ	LQ	LQ	1R	1R	1R	1R	1R	2R	2R	F	SF	SF	QF	SF	SF	2R	2R		2R	1R	LQ	1R	1R	QF	
Non-ranking tournaments
Shanghai Masters	Tournament Not Held											Ranking Event											F	QF		Not Held			A	1R	2R	2R
Champion of Champions	Tournament Not Held																	1R	QF	1R	A	1R	1R	A		A	A	A	SF	A	A	1R
The Masters	WD	LQ	LQ	LQ	LQ	LQ	LQ	LQ	A	LQ	1R	WR	LQ	LQ	A	A	1R	1R	1R	F	SF	1R	QF	1R		A	F	QF	QF	1R	1R	
Championship League	Tournament Not Held											RR	RR	RR	A	SF	2R	RR	2R	RR	SF	WD	WD	WD	2R	RR	WD	RR	WD	A	A	
Former ranking tournaments
Asian Classic	LQ	Tournament Not Held																														
Thailand Masters (Note: The event was called the Thailand Open (1996/1997))	LQ	A	A	A	LQ	1R	NR	Not Held			NR	Tournament Not Held																				
Irish Masters	Non-Ranking Event						LQ	LQ	2R	NH	NR	Tournament Not Held																				
Northern Ireland Trophy	Tournament Not Held									NR	2R	3R	QF	Tournament Not Held																		
Bahrain Championship	Tournament Not Held												QF	Tournament Not Held																		
Wuxi Classic (Note: The event was called the Jiangsu Classic (2008/2009–2009/2010))	Tournament Not Held												Non-Ranking Event				1R	2R	SF	Tournament Not Held												
Australian Goldfields Open	Tournament Not Held															LQ	W	2R	1R	A	Tournament Not Held											
Shanghai Masters	Tournament Not Held											LQ	1R	2R	LQ	LQ	1R	SF	1R	1R	2R	3R	Non-Ranking			Not Held			Non-Ranking Event			
Indian Open	Tournament Not Held																	1R	WD	NH	3R	A	A	Tournament Not Held								
Riga Masters (Note: The event was called the Riga Open (2014/2015–2015/2016))	Tournament Not Held																		Minor-Rank		A	1R	1R	LQ		Tournament Not Held						
China Championship	Tournament Not Held																				NR	2R	QF	QF		Tournament Not Held						
WST Pro Series	Tournament Not Held																									2R	Tournament Not Held					
Turkish Masters	Tournament Not Held																										LQ	Tournament Not Held				
Gibraltar Open	Tournament Not Held																			MR	4R	2R	1R	2R		2R	1R	Tournament Not Held				
WST Classic	Tournament Not Held																											2R	Tournament Not Held			
European Masters (Note: The event was called the European Open (1996/1997 and 2001/2002–2003/2004), the Irish Open (1998/1999) and the Malta Cup (2004/2005–2007/2008))	LQ	NH	A	Not Held		LQ	LQ	LQ	1R	2R	1R	NR	Tournament Not Held								2R	LQ	1R	QF		3R	2R	F	W	Not Held		
Saudi Arabia Masters	Tournament Not Held																													5R	QF	NH
Former non-ranking tournaments
Irish Masters	A	A	A	A	A	A	Ranking Event			NH	F	Tournament Not Held																				
Masters Qualifying Event (Note: The event was called the Benson & Hedges Championship (1998/1999-2002/2003))	WD	LQ	2R	1R	4R	3R	SF	2R	NH	QF	A	W	1R	1R	Tournament Not Held																	
World Grand Prix	Tournament Not Held																		1R	Ranking Event												
General Cup (Note: The event was called the General Cup International (2004/2005–2011/2012))	Tournament Not Held								A	Tournament Not Held				A	NH	A	WR	SF	A	A	Tournament Not Held											
Shoot Out	Tournament Not Held														1R	W	QF	2R	3R	1R	Ranking Event											
Romanian Masters	Tournament Not Held																					1R	Tournament Not Held									
Macau Masters	Tournament Not Held																						W	Tournament Not Held								
Paul Hunter Classic	Tournament Not Held								Pro-am Event						Minor-Ranking Event						Ranking Event			W		Tournament Not Held						
Hong Kong Masters	Tournament Not Held																					QF	Tournament Not Held					A	Tournament Not Held			
Six-red World Championship (Note: The event was called the Six-red Snooker International (2008/2009) and the Six-red World Grand Prix (2009/2010))	Tournament Not Held												A	F	SF	NH	3R	RR	2R	A	A	A	A	A		Not Held		A	Tournament Not Held			
Haining Open	Tournament Not Held																		Minor-Rank		A	A	2R	QF		NH	A	A	Tournament Not Held			

Performance Table Legend
LQ	lost in the qualifying draw	#R	lost in the early rounds of the tournament (WR = Wildcard round, RR = Round robin)	QF	lost in the quarter-finals
SF	lost in the semi-finals	F	lost in the final	W	won the tournament
DNQ	did not qualify for the tournament	A	did not participate in the tournament	WD	withdrew from the tournament

NH / Not Held	means an event was not held.
NR / Non-Ranking Event	means an event is/was no longer a ranking event.
R / Ranking Event	means an event is/was a ranking event.
MR / Minor-Ranking Event	means an event is/was a minor-ranking event.
PA / Pro-am Event	means an event is/was a pro-am event.

== Career finals ==
=== Ranking finals: 13 (5 titles) ===
Legend
World Championship (0–1)
UK Championship (0–1)
Other (5–6)

Outcome	No.	Year	Championship	Opponent in the final	Score
Winner	1.	2012	Australian Goldfields Open	(England) Peter Ebdon	9–3
Runner-up	1.	2013	World Snooker Championship	(England) Ronnie O'Sullivan	12–18
Winner	2.	2014	Players Tour Championship Finals	(Northern Ireland) Gerard Greene	4–0
Runner-up	2.	2016	Northern Ireland Open	(England) Mark King	8–9
Winner	3.	2017	World Grand Prix	(Wales) Ryan Day	10–7
Runner-up	3.	2018	Welsh Open	(Scotland) John Higgins	7–9
Runner-up	4.	2018	China Open	(England) Mark Selby	3–11
Runner-up	5.	2022	Players Championship	(Australia) Neil Robertson	5–10
Runner-up	6.	2022	European Masters	(England) Kyren Wilson	3–9
Winner	4.	2023	European Masters	(England) Judd Trump	9–6
Runner-up	7.	2024	UK Championship	(England) Judd Trump	8–10
Runner-up	8.	2025	German Masters	(England) Kyren Wilson	9–10
Winner	5.	2026	Welsh Open	(England) Jack Lisowski	9–5

=== Minor-ranking finals: 1 (1 title) ===
Outcome	No.	Year	Championship	Opponent in the final	Score
Winner	1.	2015	Riga Open	(England) Tom Ford	4–1

=== Non-ranking finals: 14 (6 titles) ===
Legend
The Masters (0–2)
Other (6–6)

Outcome	No.	Year	Championship	Opponent in the final	Score
Runner-up	1.	1999	UK Tour – Event 1	(England) Matt Wilson	4–6
Runner-up	2.	2000	UK Tour – Event 3	(England) Simon Bedford	5–6
Winner	1.	2000	UK Tour – Event 4	(England) Craig Butler	6–1
Runner-up	3.	2007	Kilkenny Irish Masters	(England) Ronnie O'Sullivan	1–9
Winner	2.	2007	Masters Qualifying Event	(Norway) Kurt Maflin	6–4
Runner-up	4.	2008	Hamm Invitational Trophy	(England) Ronnie O'Sullivan	2–6
Runner-up	5.	2009	Six-red World Grand Prix	(England) Jimmy White	6–8
Winner	3.	2010	Pro Challenge Series – Event 5	(England) Michael Holt	5–1
Winner	4.	2012	Snooker Shoot Out	(Scotland) Graeme Dott	1–0
Runner-up	6.	2016	The Masters	(England) Ronnie O'Sullivan	1–10
Runner-up	7.	2018	Shanghai Masters	(England) Ronnie O'Sullivan	9–11
Winner	5.	2018	Six-red Macau Masters	(Wales) Mark Williams	3–2
Winner	6.	2019	Paul Hunter Classic	(England) Kyren Wilson	4–3
Runner-up	8.	2022	The Masters (2)	(Australia) Neil Robertson	4–10

=== Pro-am finals: 2 ===
Outcome	No.	Year	Championship	Opponent in the final	Score
Runner-up	1.	2006	Fürth German Open	(England) Michael Holt	2–4
Runner-up	2.	2013	Pink Ribbon	(England) Joe Perry	3–4

=== Team finals: 2 (1 title) ===
Outcome	No.	Year	Championship	Team/Partner	Opponent(s) in the final	Score
Runner-up	1.	2017	World Cup	England; Judd Trump	China A Ding Junhui; Liang Wenbo	3–4
Winner	1.	2018	Macau Masters	(Wales) Ryan Day (China) Zhao Xintong (China) Zhou Yuelong	(Wales) Mark Williams (England) Joe Perry (Hong Kong) Marco Fu (China) Zhang Anda	5–1

=== Amateur finals: 1 (1 title) ===
Outcome	No.	Year	Championship	Opponent in the final	Score
Winner	1.	1994	UK Under-15 Championship	(England) Robert Oldfield	3–1
