= 2027 Players Championship (snooker) =

Snooker tournament

- Part of the Players Series

Tournament information
- Dates: 2–7 March 2027
- Venue: Telford International Centre
- City: Telford
- Country: England
- Organisation: World Snooker Tour
- Format: Ranking event
- Defending champion: Zhao Xintong (CHN)

The 2027 Players Championship is an upcoming professional snooker tournament that will take place from 2 to 7 March 2027 at the Telford International Centre in Telford, England. The top 16 players on the one-year ranking list, as it stands after the 2027 World Grand Prix, will qualify for the event. The 11th consecutive staging of the Players Championship since it became a standalone tournament in 2017, it will be the 15th ranking event of the 2026–27 snooker season, following the 2027 World Grand Prix and preceding the 2027 World Open. It will be the second of three events in the Players Series, following the 2027 World Grand Prix and preceding the 2027 Tour Championship.

Zhao Xintong is the defending champion, having defeated John Higgins 10–7 in the 2026 final.

== Overview ==
The tournament originated as the final of the Players Tour Championship, a former series of minor-ranking tournaments that was held in Europe and Asia from 2011 to 2016. In 2017, the event was rebranded as the Players Championship, a standalone tournament for the top 16 players on the one-year ranking list. The inaugural winner was Judd Trump, who defeated Marco Fu 10–8 in the 2017 final.

The 2027 edition of the tournament—its 11th consecutive staging since it became a standalone event in 2017—will take place from 17 to 22 February at the Telford International Centre in Telford, England. It will be the 15th ranking event of the 2026–27 snooker season, following the 2027 World Grand Prix and preceding the 2027 World Open. It will be the second of three events in the Players Series, following the 2027 World Grand Prix and preceding the 2027 Tour Championship. Zhao Xintong is the defending champion, having defeated John Higgins 10–7 in the 2026 final.
