= Players Championship (snooker) =

Professional snooker tournament

- Part of the Players Series

Tournament information
- Venue: Telford International Centre
- Location: Telford
- Country: England
- Established: 2011
- Organisation(s): World Snooker Tour
- Format: Ranking event
- Total prize fund: £500,000
- Recent edition: 2026
- Current champion: Zhao Xintong (CHN)

The Players Championship is a professional ranking snooker tournament. Held as the Players Tour Championship Finals from 2011 to 2016, it was rebranded as the standalone Players Championship in 2017. One of three events in the Players Series, it features the top 16 players on the one-year ranking list. Zhao Xintong is the reigning champion, having won the 2026 event.

== History ==
After the establishment of the Players Tour Championship, the Players Tour Championship Finals was first held in 2011 at The Helix in Dublin, between the top 24 players of the Order of Merit, who played at least six events; three in Sheffield and three in mainland Europe. The event was sponsored by PartyCasino. In 2012 the event moved to the Bailey Allen Hall in Galway, and was sponsored by Betfair. In 2013 the event was sponsored by Dafabet, and the competition was expanded to 32 players. The field consisted of the top 25 players from the UK/European Order of Merit, the top four players from the Asian Order of Merit and the three APTC event winners. The seedings of the final was based on the combined list of both Order of Merits.

In 2014 the event moved to the Guild Hall in Preston, England. It was originally planned that the event would take place in Bangkok, Thailand, but due to the political unrest in the country the World Professional Billiards and Snooker Association decided to relocate the event. The qualifying criteria were also changed for the 2014 event. The event still accommodated 32 players, but the number of qualified players from the Order of Merits was changed with 24 coming through the European Tour Order of Merit and eight through the Asian Tour Order of Merit.

In the 2016/17 season, the Players Tour Championship was cancelled and the main event was renamed to Players Championship and moved to Llandudno, Wales. It is now played between the top 16 players on a one-year ranking list.

== Winners ==
Year	Winner	Runner-up	Final score	Venue	City	Season
Players Tour Championship Finals (ranking, 2011–2016)
2011	Shaun Murphy (ENG)	Martin Gould (ENG)	4–0	The Helix	Dublin, Ireland	2010/11
2012	Stephen Lee (ENG)	Neil Robertson (AUS)	4–0	Bailey Allen Hall	Galway, Ireland	2011/12
2013	Ding Junhui (CHN)	Neil Robertson (AUS)	4–3	Bailey Allen Hall	Galway, Ireland	2012/13
2014	Barry Hawkins (ENG)	Gerard Greene (NIR)	4–0	Preston Guild Hall	Preston, England	2013/14
2015	Joe Perry (ENG)	Mark Williams (WAL)	4–3	Montien Riverside Hotel	Bangkok, Thailand	2014/15
2016	Mark Allen (NIR)	Ricky Walden (ENG)	10–6	EventCity	Manchester, England	2015/16
Players Championship (ranking, 2017–present)
2017	Judd Trump (ENG)	Marco Fu (HKG)	10–8	Venue Cymru	Llandudno, Wales	2016/17
2018	Ronnie O'Sullivan (ENG)	Shaun Murphy (ENG)	10–4	Venue Cymru	Llandudno, Wales	2017/18
2019	Ronnie O'Sullivan (ENG)	Neil Robertson (AUS)	10–4	Preston Guild Hall	Preston, England	2018/19
2020	Judd Trump (ENG)	Yan Bingtao (CHN)	10–4	Southport Theatre	Southport, England	2019/20
2021	John Higgins (SCO)	Ronnie O'Sullivan (ENG)	10–3	Marshall Arena	Milton Keynes, England	2020/21
2022	Neil Robertson (AUS)	Barry Hawkins (ENG)	10–5	Aldersley Leisure Village	Wolverhampton, England	2021/22
2023	Shaun Murphy (ENG)	Ali Carter (ENG)	10–4	Aldersley Leisure Village	Wolverhampton, England	2022/23
2024	Mark Allen (NIR)	Zhang Anda (CHN)	10–8	Telford International Centre	Telford, England	2023/24
2025	Kyren Wilson (ENG)	Judd Trump (ENG)	10–9	Telford International Centre	Telford, England	2024/25
2026	Zhao Xintong (CHN)	John Higgins (SCO)	10–7	Telford International Centre	Telford, England	2025/26
2027				Telford International Centre	Telford, England	2026/27

== Finalists ==
Name	Nationality	Winner	Runner-up	Finals
**Ronnie O'Sullivan**	England	2	1	3
**Judd Trump**	England	2	1	3
**Shaun Murphy**	England	2	1	3
**Mark Allen**	Northern Ireland	2	0	2
**Neil Robertson**	Australia	1	3	4
**Barry Hawkins**	England	1	1	2
**John Higgins**	Scotland	1	1	2
Stephen Lee	England	1	0	1
**Ding Junhui**	China	1	0	1
Joe Perry	England	1	0	1
**Kyren Wilson**	England	1	0	1
**Zhao Xintong**	China	1	0	1
Martin Gould	England	0	1	1
Gerard Greene	Northern Ireland	0	1	1
**Mark Williams**	Wales	0	1	1
**Ricky Walden**	England	0	1	1
**Marco Fu**	Hong Kong	0	1	1
Yan Bingtao	China	0	1	1
**Ali Carter**	England	0	1	1
**Zhang Anda**	China	0	1	1

Legend
The names of active players are marked in **bold**.
