= 2027 Tour Championship =

Snooker tournament

- Part of the Players Series

Tournament information
- Dates: 29 March – 4 April 2027
- Venue: Manchester Central
- City: Manchester
- Country: England
- Organisation: World Snooker Tour
- Format: Ranking event
- Defending champion: Zhao Xintong (CHN)

The 2027 Tour Championship is an upcoming professional snooker tournament that will take place from 29 March to 4 April 2027 at the Manchester Central in Manchester, England. It will feature the top 12 players on the one-year ranking list, as it stands after the 2027 World Open. The ninth consecutive edition of the Tour Championship since it was first staged in 2019, it will be the 17th and penultimate ranking event of the 2026–27 snooker season, following the 2027 World Open and preceding the 2027 World Snooker Championship. It will be the last of three events in the season's Players Series, following the 2027 World Grand Prix and the 2027 Players Championship.

Zhao Xintong is the defending champion, having defeated Judd Trump 10–3 in the 2026 final.

== Overview ==
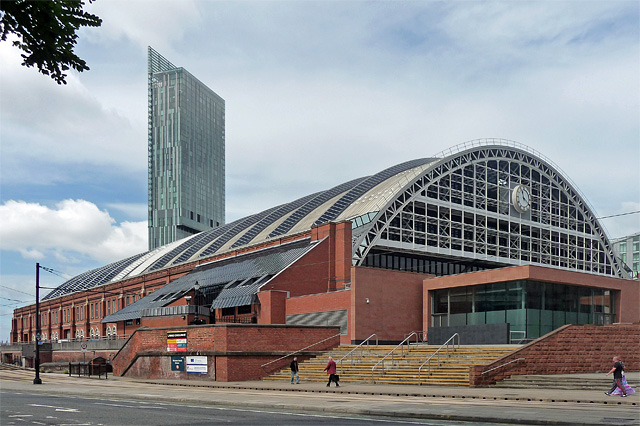
The event will take place at the Manchester Central in Manchester, England.

First held in 2019, the Tour Championship is the only event on the professional tour other than the World Snooker Championship to feature multi-session matches throughout the entire tournament. Ronnie O'Sullivan won the inaugural edition, staged in Llandudno, Wales, with a 13–11 victory over Neil Robertson in the final. The field of players was originally the top 8 on the one-year ranking list, but it was subsequently expanded to the top 12, beginning with the 2024 edition.

The 2027 edition of the tournament—its ninth consecutive staging since the inaugural edition in 2019—will take place from 29 March to 4 April at the Manchester Central in Manchester, England. It will be the 17th and penultimate ranking event of the 2026–27 snooker season, following the 2027 World Open and preceding the 2027 World Snooker Championship. It will be the last of three events in the season's Players Series, following the 2027 World Grand Prix and the 2027 Players Championship.
