= 2027 Championship League (invitational) =

Invitational snooker tournament

2027 BetVictor Championship League Invitational
Tournament information
- Dates: 21 December 2026 – 23 January 2027
- Venue: Leicester Arena
- City: Leicester
- Country: England
- Organisation: Matchroom Sport
- Format: Non-ranking event
- Total prize fund: £205,000
- Winner's share: £10,000 (plus bonuses)
- Defending champion: Mark Selby (ENG)

The 2027 Championship League Invitational (officially the 2027 BetVictor Championship League Snooker Invitational) is an upcoming professional non-ranking snooker tournament that will take place from 21 December 2026 to 23 January 2027 at the Leicester Arena in Leicester, England. Part of the 2026–27 snooker season, it will be the 21st edition of the invitational version of the tournament, which was first staged in 2008.

Mark Selby is the defending champion, having retained the title for a third consecutive time at the 2026 event by defeating Wu Yize 3–1 in the final.

== Overview ==
The tournament will take place from 21 December 2026 to 23 January 2027 at the Leicester Arena in Leicester, England. Mark Selby is the defending champion, having defeated Wu Yize 3–1 in the final of the 2026 event, retaining the title for a third consecutive time.

=== Format ===
A total of 25 players are initially invited to the event, with the matches played behind closed doors without an audience. Players earn prize money for every frame won, as well as being semi‑finalists, runners‑up, and winners of each group, with more money involved in the Winners' Group. Since 2010 all matches have been played as the best of five frames.

The tournament is played in a round‑robin format, consisting of eight groups of seven players. The top four players in each group qualify for a play‑off, with the winner entering the Winners' Group. The bottom two players in each group are eliminated, and the remaining four moved to the next group, where they are joined by three more players. This format is played for each group, from one to seven. In each group, the players are ranked by the number of matches won, then by most frames won, and then by least frames lost. If two players are tied by these criteria, the player who wins the match between them is ranked higher in the table. The group play‑off semi‑finals are contested between the 1st and 4th place players in the table, and between the 2nd and 3rd place players in the table. The Winners' Group is played at the end, and its play‑off winner becomes champion of the tournament.

Group 1 will be played on 21 and 22 December 2026; Groups 2 to 5 will be played from 2 to 9 January 2027; Groups 6, 7, and the Winners' Group will be played from 18 to 23 January 2027. The champion will take a place in the 2027 Champion of Champions.

=== Prize fund ===
The breakdown of prize money for the 2027 Championship League is as follows:

- Groups 1–7
  - Winner: £3,000
  - Runner-up: £2,000
  - Semi-final: £1,000
  - Frame-win (league stage): £100
  - Frame-win (play-offs): £300
  - Highest break: £500
- Winners' Group
  - Winner: £10,000
  - Runner-up: £5,000
  - Semi-final: £3,000
  - Frame-win (league stage): £200
  - Frame-win (play-offs): £300
  - Highest break: £1,000
- Maximum possible tournament total: £205,000 (if all match results are 3–2)
- Minimum possible tournament total: £152,800 (if all match results are 3–0)

== Group 1 ==
Group 1 will be played on 21 and 22 December 2026.

=== Group 1 league matches ===
==== 21 December ====
- Order of play for the 12 matches to be decided.

==== 22 December ====
- Order of play for the 9 matches to be decided.

=== Group 1 table ===
Pos	Player	Pld	W	L	FF	FA	FD
1	Group 1 – Player 1	0	0	0	0	0	0
2	Group 1 – Player 2	0	0	0	0	0	0
3	Group 1 – Player 3	0	0	0	0	0	0
4	Group 1 – Player 4	0	0	0	0	0	0
5	Group 1 – Player 5	0	0	0	0	0	0
6	Group 1 – Player 6	0	0	0	0	0	0
7	Group 1 – Player 7	0	0	0	0	0	0

Source: Group 1 results from snooker.org and championshipleaguesnooker.co.uk

=== Group 1 play-offs ===
Semi-finals; Best of 5 frames
1st place player from table
4th place player from table
2nd place player from table
3rd place player from table

Final; Best of 5 frames
1st semi-final winner
2nd semi-final winner

== Group 2 ==
Group 2 will be played on 2 and 3 January 2027.

=== Group 2 league matches ===
==== 2 January ====
- Order of play for the 12 matches to be decided.

==== 3 January ====
- Order of play for the 9 matches to be decided.

=== Group 2 table ===
Pos	Player	Pld	W	L	FF	FA	FD
1	Group 2 – Player 1	0	0	0	0	0	0
2	Group 2 – Player 2	0	0	0	0	0	0
3	Group 2 – Player 3	0	0	0	0	0	0
4	Group 2 – Player 4	0	0	0	0	0	0
5	Group 2 – Player 5	0	0	0	0	0	0
6	Group 2 – Player 6	0	0	0	0	0	0
7	Group 2 – Player 7	0	0	0	0	0	0

Source: Group 2 results from snooker.org and championshipleaguesnooker.co.uk

=== Group 2 play-offs ===
Semi-finals; Best of 5 frames
1st place player from table
4th place player from table
2nd place player from table
3rd place player from table

Final; Best of 5 frames
1st semi-final winner
2nd semi-final winner

== Group 3 ==
Group 3 will be played on 4 and 5 January 2027.

=== Group 3 league matches ===
==== 4 January ====
- Order of play for the 12 matches to be decided.

==== 5 January ====
- Order of play for the 9 matches to be decided.

=== Group 3 table ===
Pos	Player	Pld	W	L	FF	FA	FD
1	Group 3 – Player 1	0	0	0	0	0	0
2	Group 3 – Player 2	0	0	0	0	0	0
3	Group 3 – Player 3	0	0	0	0	0	0
4	Group 3 – Player 4	0	0	0	0	0	0
5	Group 3 – Player 5	0	0	0	0	0	0
6	Group 3 – Player 6	0	0	0	0	0	0
7	Group 3 – Player 7	0	0	0	0	0	0

Source: Group 3 results from snooker.org and championshipleaguesnooker.co.uk

=== Group 3 play-offs ===
Semi-finals; Best of 5 frames
1st place player from table
4th place player from table
2nd place player from table
3rd place player from table

Final; Best of 5 frames
1st semi-final winner
2nd semi-final winner

== Group 4 ==
Group 4 will be played on 6 and 7 January 2027.

=== Group 4 league matches ===
==== 6 January ====
- Order of play for the 12 matches to be decided.

==== 7 January ====
- Order of play for the 9 matches to be decided.

=== Group 4 table ===
Pos	Player	Pld	W	L	FF	FA	FD
1	Group 4 – Player 1	0	0	0	0	0	0
2	Group 4 – Player 2	0	0	0	0	0	0
3	Group 4 – Player 3	0	0	0	0	0	0
4	Group 4 – Player 4	0	0	0	0	0	0
5	Group 4 – Player 5	0	0	0	0	0	0
6	Group 4 – Player 6	0	0	0	0	0	0
7	Group 4 – Player 7	0	0	0	0	0	0

Source: Group 4 results from snooker.org and championshipleaguesnooker.co.uk

=== Group 4 play-offs ===
Semi-finals; Best of 5 frames
1st place player from table
4th place player from table
2nd place player from table
3rd place player from table

Final; Best of 5 frames
1st semi-final winner
2nd semi-final winner

== Group 5 ==
Group 5 will be played on 8 and 9 January 2027.

=== Group 5 league matches ===
==== 8 January ====
- Order of play for the 12 matches to be decided.

==== 9 January ====
- Order of play for the 9 matches to be decided.

=== Group 5 table ===
Pos	Player	Pld	W	L	FF	FA	FD
1	Group 5 – Player 1	0	0	0	0	0	0
2	Group 5 – Player 2	0	0	0	0	0	0
3	Group 5 – Player 3	0	0	0	0	0	0
4	Group 5 – Player 4	0	0	0	0	0	0
5	Group 5 – Player 5	0	0	0	0	0	0
6	Group 5 – Player 6	0	0	0	0	0	0
7	Group 5 – Player 7	0	0	0	0	0	0

Source: Group 5 results from snooker.org and championshipleaguesnooker.co.uk

=== Group 5 play-offs ===
Semi-finals; Best of 5 frames
1st place player from table
4th place player from table
2nd place player from table
3rd place player from table

Final; Best of 5 frames
1st semi-final winner
2nd semi-final winner

== Group 6 ==
Group 6 will be played on 18 and 19 January 2027.

=== Group 6 league matches ===
==== 18 January ====
- Order of play for the 12 matches to be decided.

==== 19 January ====
- Order of play for the 9 matches to be decided.

=== Group 6 table ===
Pos	Player	Pld	W	L	FF	FA	FD
1	Group 6 – Player 1	0	0	0	0	0	0
2	Group 6 – Player 2	0	0	0	0	0	0
3	Group 6 – Player 3	0	0	0	0	0	0
4	Group 6 – Player 4	0	0	0	0	0	0
5	Group 6 – Player 5	0	0	0	0	0	0
6	Group 6 – Player 6	0	0	0	0	0	0
7	Group 6 – Player 7	0	0	0	0	0	0

Source: Group 6 results from snooker.org and championshipleaguesnooker.co.uk

=== Group 6 play-offs ===
Semi-finals; Best of 5 frames
1st place player from table
4th place player from table
2nd place player from table
3rd place player from table

Final; Best of 5 frames
1st semi-final winner
2nd semi-final winner

== Group 7 ==
Group 7 will be played on 20 and 21 January 2027.

=== Group 7 league matches ===
==== 20 January ====
- Order of play for the 12 matches to be decided.

==== 21 January ====
- Order of play for the 9 matches to be decided.

=== Group 7 table ===
Pos	Player	Pld	W	L	FF	FA	FD
1	Group 7 – Player 1	0	0	0	0	0	0
2	Group 7 – Player 2	0	0	0	0	0	0
3	Group 7 – Player 3	0	0	0	0	0	0
4	Group 7 – Player 4	0	0	0	0	0	0
5	Group 7 – Player 5	0	0	0	0	0	0
6	Group 7 – Player 6	0	0	0	0	0	0
7	Group 7 – Player 7	0	0	0	0	0	0

Source: Group 7 results from snooker.org and championshipleaguesnooker.co.uk

=== Group 7 play-offs ===
Semi-finals; Best of 5 frames
1st place player from table
4th place player from table
2nd place player from table
3rd place player from table

Final; Best of 5 frames
1st semi-final winner
2nd semi-final winner

== Winners' Group ==
The Winners' Group will be played on 22 and 23 January 2027.

=== Winners' Group league matches ===
==== 22 January ====
- Order of play for the 12 matches to be decided.

==== 23 January ====
- Order of play for the 9 matches to be decided.

=== Winners' Group table ===
Pos	Player	Pld	W	L	FF	FA	FD
1	Group 1 winner	0	0	0	0	0	0
2	Group 2 winner	0	0	0	0	0	0
3	Group 3 winner	0	0	0	0	0	0
4	Group 4 winner	0	0	0	0	0	0
5	Group 5 winner	0	0	0	0	0	0
6	Group 6 winner	0	0	0	0	0	0
7	Group 7 winner	0	0	0	0	0	0

Source: Winners' Group results from snooker.org and championshipleaguesnooker.co.uk

=== Winners' Group play-offs ===
Semi-finals; Best of 5 frames
1st place player from table
4th place player from table
2nd place player from table
3rd place player from table

Final; Best of 5 frames
1st semi-final winner
2nd semi-final winner

== Winnings ==
No.	Player	1	2	3	4	5	6	7	W	Total
1	Player 1									
2	Player 2									
3	Player 3									
4	Player 4									
5	Player 5									
6	Player 6									
7	Player 7									
8	Player 8									
9	Player 9									
10	Player 10									
11	Player 11									
12	Player 12									
13	Player 13									
14	Player 14									
15	Player 15									
16	Player 16									
17	Player 17									
18	Player 18									
19	Player 19									
20	Player 20									
21	Player 21									
22	Player 22									
23	Player 23									
24	Player 24									
25	Player 25									
	Total prize money:	0	0	0	0	0	0	0	0	0

Green: Won the Group.
Bold: Highest break in the Group.
Q: Qualified for the Winners' Group.
Numbers in parentheses: World ranking prior to tournament start, 21 December 2026.
All prize money in GBP. (Note: Source (championshipleaguesnooker.co.uk) does not always include high-break prize money in totals.)
Players receive prize money for frames won in voided matches
even though they do not count in the group tables.
