= 2027 World Snooker Championship =

Professional snooker tournament

- Part of the snooker Triple Crown

Tournament information
- Dates: 17 April – 3 May 2027
- Venue: Crucible Theatre
- City: Sheffield
- Country: England
- Organisation: World Snooker Tour
- Format: Ranking event
- Total prize fund: £3,000,000
- Winner's share: £625,000
- Defending champion: Wu Yize (CHN)

The 2027 World Snooker Championship is an upcoming professional snooker tournament that will take place from 17 April to 3 May 2027 at the Crucible Theatre in Sheffield, England, the 51st consecutive year that the World Snooker Championship is staged at the venue. The tournament will be the centenary edition of the World Snooker Championship, which was first held in 1927. Organised by the World Snooker Tour, the tournament will be the 18th and final ranking event of the 2026–‍27 snooker season.

Wu Yize will be the defending champion, having defeated Shaun Murphy 18–17 in the 2026 final.

== Background ==
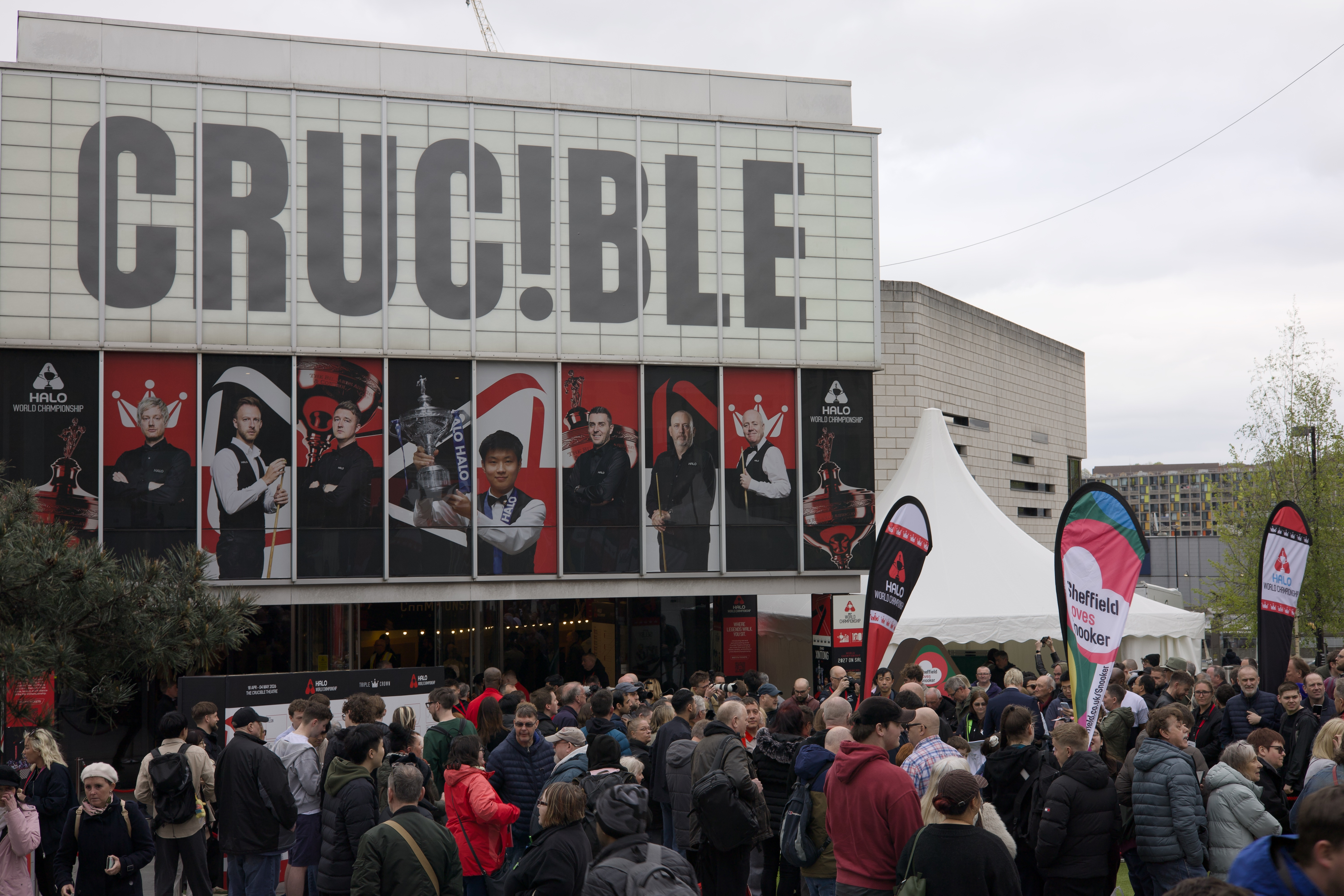
For the 51st consecutive year, the main stage of the tournament will be held at the Crucible Theatre (pictured in 2026) in Sheffield, England.

The inaugural 1927 World Snooker Championship, then known as the Professional Championship of Snooker, took place at various venues in England between November 1926 and May 1927. Joe Davis won the final, held at Camkin's Hall in Birmingham from 9 to 12 May 1927, and went on to win all of the first 15 stagings of the tournament before retiring undefeated after the 1946 edition (no tournaments were held from 1941 to 1945 because of World War II). The tournament went into abeyance after only two players contested the 1952 edition, due to a dispute between the Professional Billiards Players' Association (PBPA) and the Billiards Association and Control Council (BACC). The PBPA established an alternative tournament, the World Professional Match-play Championship, of which the six editions held between 1952 and 1957 are retroactively regarded as legitimate continuations of the World Snooker Championship. However, due to waning public interest in snooker during the post-war era, that tournament was also discontinued, and the world title was uncontested between 1958 and 1963.

Professional player Rex Williams was instrumental in reviving the World Snooker Championship on a challenge basis in 1964. John Pulman, winner of the 1957 World Professional Match-play Championship, defended the world title across seven challenge matches between 1964 and 1968. The World Snooker Championship reverted to an annual knockout tournament for the 1969 edition, which marked the beginning of the championship's "modern era". The 1977 edition was the first staged at the Crucible Theatre in Sheffield, where it has remained since. As of 2027, the most successful players in the modern era are Stephen Hendry and Ronnie O'Sullivan, each having won the title seven times. Hendry is the tournament's youngest winner, having captured his first title at the 1990 event, aged 21 years and 106 days. O'Sullivan is the oldest winner, having won his seventh title at the 2022 event, aged 46 years and 148 days. O'Sullivan, who made his 34th consecutive appearance at the 2026 event, has featured at the Crucible more times than any other player.

== Overview ==
The 2027 edition of the tournament—the 59th successive year that the World Snooker Championship is contested through the modern knockout format—will take place from 17 April to 3 May at the Crucible Theatre in Sheffield, England. It will be the 51st consecutive year that the World Championship is staged at the venue. Organised by the World Snooker Tour, the tournament will be the 18th and final ranking event of the 2026–‍27 snooker season, following the 2027 Tour Championship. Wu Yize will be the defending champion, having defeated Shaun Murphy 18–17 in the 2026 final. Wu will be the 22nd player to face the so-called "Crucible curse", referring to the fact that no first-time champion has retained the title since the tournament moved to the Crucible in 1977.

=== Format ===
The top 16 players from the snooker world rankings, as they stand after the 2027 Tour Championship, will be seeded through to the main stage at the Crucible. The qualifying rounds will take place from 5 to 14 April at the English Institute of Sport in Sheffield, featuring 128 professional and invited amateur competitors, 16 of whom will join the seeds at the Crucible.

=== Prize fund ===
The winner of the event will receive £625,000 from a total prize fund of £3,000,000. The winner's prize will increase from £500,000 to £625,000, the first change since 2019. The total prize fund will increase from £2,395,000 to £3,000,000, the first change since 2020.
