= 2019 Paul Hunter Classic =

Snooker tournament, held August 2019

Tournament information
- Dates: 24–25 August 2019
- Venue: Stadthalle
- City: Fürth
- Country: Germany
- Organisation: Dragonstars Event Management
- Format: Non-ranking event
- Total prize fund: €13,500
- Winner's share: €5,000
- Highest break: Barry Hawkins (ENG) (120)

Final
- Champion: Barry Hawkins (ENG)
- Runner-up: Kyren Wilson (ENG)
- Score: 4–3

Location in Germany

The 2019 Paul Hunter Classic was a professional non-ranking invitational snooker tournament. The event took place between 24 and 25 August 2019 at the Stadthalle in Fürth, Germany. The tournament was the 2019 edition of the Paul Hunter Classic first held in 2004 as the Grand Prix Fürth. The tournament is named in honour of snooker professional, Paul Hunter who won the 2004 event and died in 2006. The event featured a 16-player bracket with a qualification tournament that was held in Nuremberg, Germany. As the tournament was dropped as a ranking event, independent promoters Dragonstars Event Management promoted the event providing prize money for the tournament.

Kyren Wilson was the defending champion, having defeated Peter Ebdon 4–2 in the 2018 final. Barry Hawkins won the title 4–3 defeating Wilson in the final. Wison lead 3–2 and required one frame to win the title, he was one ball from winning but lost the frame 64–65 and Hawkins won the decider to win the title.

Barry Hawkins scored the highest break of the event, with a 120 in the third frame of the final.

== Tournament format ==
The 2019 Paul Hunter Classic was a professional snooker tournament held on 24 and 25 August 2019 at the Stadthalle in Fürth, Germany. Having been a ranking event since 2010, the event was changed to an invitational basis, with no ranking points allocated. This was because the WPBSA did not want to finance a ranking event with 128 players with a small prize fund. Independent promoter Dragonstars Event Management promoted the event providing the prize money, then the WPBSA added their sanction to the event. The Paul Hunter Classic was named after deceased snooker professional, Paul Hunter, who won the event in 2004, before passing in 2006. A total of 15 players were invited to compete in the event, with one qualifier, who had won a qualifying event featuring 36 participants. 13-year-old Iulian Boiko won the qualifying event, defeating Barry Pinches in the final 3–2. Pinches also had the highest break of qualifying, a 109.

The defending champion of the event was Kyren Wilson, having defeated Peter Ebdon 4–2 in the previous year's final. Wilson was invited to compete in the event. Both Shaun Murphy and Matthew Stevens were invited to play but pulled out of the event. They were replaced by Ricky Walden and Gary Wilson respectively. Murphy later revealed that he pulled out of the event due to tearing his Achilles tendon, dancing to Disney's Greatest Hits. All matches held in the event were played as best-of-7-frames.

=== Prize fund ===
The event features a total prize fund of €13,500 and €5,000 awarded to the winner. This was a significant reduction from the previous year's total prize fund of £100,000 total prize pool, due to the event no longer being a ranking event. The breakdown of prize money for this year is shown below:

- Winner: €5,000
- Runner up: €2,500
- Semi-finals: €1,000
- Quarter-finals: €500
- Last-16: €250
- Total: €13,500

== Tournament summary ==
The 2019 Paul Hunter Classic was held over two days, with the first round held on 24 August and the quarter-finals through to the final on 25 August. Three amateur players were invited to play, in Ryan Davies, Florian Nüßle and Ben Mertens. One additional place was awarded via a qualifying event that was held in Nuremberg, Germany. Iulian Boiko won the qualifying event, defeating Barry Pinches 3–2 in the final.

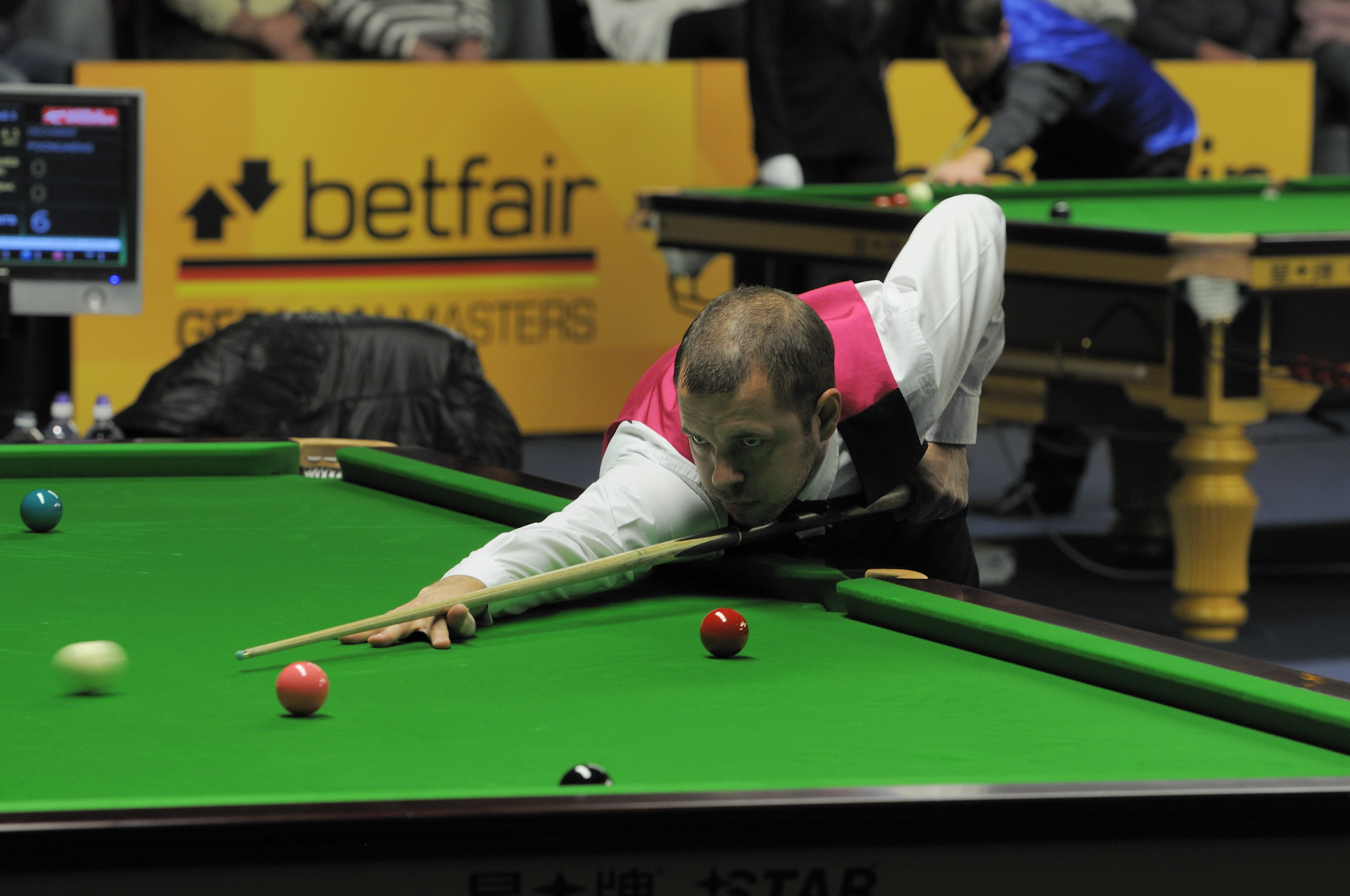
Barry Hawkins won the event, where he won the final 4–3 over defending champion Kyren Wilson

All four amateur players failed to win a single frame, with Boiko losing to Ricky Walden, Mertens to Joe Perry, Davies to Mark King and Nüßle to defending champion Kyren Wilson with all matches finishing 4–0. In the other four first-round matches, Dominic Dale defeated Matthew Selt, Luca Brecel defeated Ken Doherty, David Gilbert defeated Michael Holt and Barry Hawkins defeated Gary Wilson (all 4–1). The quarter-finals featured Luca Brecel and Barry Hawkins both win 4–1 over Ricky Walden and Mark King respectively. Both of the other two matches finished on a deciding frame. Kyren Wilson defeated Dominic Dale and Joe Perry defeated David Gilbert 4–3. The final four players were all part of the world top-16. Kyren Wilson defeated Luca Brecel 4–1, whilst Barry Hawkins defeated Joe Perry 4–3.

The final was played between Wilson and Hawkins. Wilson won the first frame, before Hawkins won the next two frames, including the highest break of the tournament – a 120 in frame 3. Wilson won the next two frames with two 50+ breaks. Leading 3–2 Wilson made a break of 57 points in frame 6, one pot from winning the event, however, failed to pot the next shot with Hawkins winning the frame by a single point with a clearance of 41 to win the frame 65–64 to force a deciding frame. Hawkins won the frame and the event with a break of 69.

Hawkins commented after the match "To win a title early in the season puts me in good stead." He also commented that his sights were on winning the two following events to be held in China, the International Championship and the China Championship. However, Hawkins would only reach the quarter-finals at the China Championship and lose in the first round of the International Championship.

== Main rounds ==
The competition was played with best-of-7-frames matches. Players in bold denote match winners.

Last 16; Best of 7 frames
**Kyren Wilson (ENG)**	**4**
Florian Nüßle (AUT)	0
Matthew Selt (ENG)	1
**Dominic Dale (WAL)**	**4**
**Luca Brecel (BEL)**	**4**
Ken Doherty (IRL)	1
**Ricky Walden (ENG)**	**4**
Iulian Boiko (UKR)	0
**David Gilbert (ENG)**	**4**
Michael Holt (ENG)	1
**Joe Perry (ENG)**	**4**
Ben Mertens (BEL)	0
**Mark King (ENG)**	**4**
Ryan Davies (ENG)	0
**Barry Hawkins (ENG)**	**4**
Gary Wilson (ENG)	1

Quarter-finals; Best of 7 frames
**(England) Kyren Wilson**	**4**
(Wales) Dominic Dale	3
**(Belgium) Luca Brecel**	**4**
(England) Ricky Walden	1
(England) David Gilbert	3
**(England) Joe Perry**	**4**
(England) Mark King	1
**(England) Barry Hawkins**	**4**

Semi-finals; Best of 7 frames
**(England) Kyren Wilson**	**4**
(Belgium) Luca Brecel	1
(England) Joe Perry	3
**(England) Barry Hawkins**	**4**

Final; Best of 7 frames
(England) Kyren Wilson	3
**(England) Barry Hawkins**	**4**

=== Final ===
Final: Best of 7 frames. Stadthalle, Fürth, Germany, 25 August 2019.
Kyren Wilson; England	3–**4**	**Barry Hawkins**; England
**70**–40, 27–**77** (63), 2–**120** (120), **91**–0 (59), **66**–22 (52), 64–**65** (Wilson 57), 7–**73** (69)
59	Highest break	**120**
0	Century breaks	**1**
3	50+ breaks	3

== Century breaks ==
A total of seven century breaks were made during the event. Barry Hawkins made the highest break of the tournament, a 120.

- 120, 113, 101 – Barry Hawkins
- 108 – David Gilbert
- 104 – Ricky Walden
- 102, 102 – Luca Brecel
