= 2017 Players Championship (snooker) =

Snooker tournament in Wales

2017 Ladbrokes Players Championship
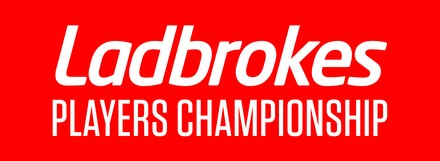

Tournament information
- Dates: 6–12 March 2017
- Venue: Venue Cymru
- City: Llandudno
- Country: Wales
- Organisation: World Snooker
- Format: Ranking event
- Total prize fund: £380,000
- Winner's share: £125,000
- Highest break: Judd Trump (ENG) (136)

Final
- Champion: Judd Trump (ENG)
- Runner-up: Marco Fu (HKG)
- Score: 10–8

The 2017 Players Championship (officially the 2017 Ladbrokes Players Championship) was a professional ranking snooker tournament played between 6–12 March 2017 at the Venue Cymru in Llandudno, Wales. It was the 17th ranking event of the 2016/2017 season.

Prior to this season, this tournament was part of the Players Tour Championship: however, that minor-ranking series was cancelled for this season, and the "Grand Final" event at the end was renamed to be its own ranking event called the Players Championship. It was played between the top 16 players on a one-year ranking list.

Mark Allen was the defending champion, but he did not qualify for this year's tournament.

Judd Trump won the tournament, beating Marco Fu 10–8 in the final.

== Prize fund ==
The breakdown of prize money is shown below.

| | Prize fund |
|---|---|
| Winner | £125,000 |
| Runner-up | £50,000 |
| Semi-finalist | £30,000 |
| Quarter-finalist | £15,000 |
| Last 16 | £10,000 |
| Highest break | £5,000 |
| Total | £380,000 |

The "rolling 147 prize" for a maximum break stood at £25,000.

== Seeding list ==
The seedings were conducted on the basis of the 1-year ranking list up to and including the 2017 Gibraltar Open:

| Rank | Player | Total points |
|---|---|---|
| 1 | Mark Selby (ENG) | 384,550 |
| 2 | Judd Trump (ENG) | 208,250 |
| 3 | Barry Hawkins (ENG) | 205,725 |
| 4 | Stuart Bingham (ENG) | 181,087 |
| 5 | Ding Junhui (CHN) | 178,025 |
| 6 | Ali Carter (ENG) | 173,025 |
| 7 | Ronnie O'Sullivan (ENG) | 153,750 |
| 8 | Marco Fu (HKG) | 152,650 |
| 9 | Anthony McGill (SCO) | 141,800 |
| 10 | Liang Wenbo (CHN) | 140,400 |
| 11 | Shaun Murphy (ENG) | 129,375 |
| 12 | John Higgins (SCO) | 124,025 |
| 13 | Anthony Hamilton (ENG) | 119,925 |
| 14 | Neil Robertson (AUS) | 114,125 |
| 15 | Mark King (ENG) | 109,325 |
| 16 | Ryan Day (WAL) | 101,362 |

== Main draw ==
Last 16; Best of 9 frames
1 | Mark Selby (ENG) | 5
16 | Ryan Day (WAL) | 4
8 | Marco Fu (HKG) | 5
9 | Anthony McGill (SCO) | 1
5 | Ding Junhui (CHN) | 5
12 | John Higgins (SCO) | 4
4 | Stuart Bingham (ENG) | 1
13 | Anthony Hamilton (ENG) | 5
3 | Barry Hawkins (ENG) | 0
14 | Neil Robertson (AUS) | 5
6 | Ali Carter (ENG) | 5
11 | Shaun Murphy (ENG) | 4
7 | Ronnie O'Sullivan (ENG) | 5
10 | Liang Wenbo (CHN) | 1
2 | Judd Trump (ENG) | 5
15 | Mark King (ENG) | 2

Quarter-finals; Best of 9 frames
1 | (England) Mark Selby | 2
8 | (Hong Kong) Marco Fu | 5
5 | (China) Ding Junhui | 5
13 | (England) Anthony Hamilton | 2
14 | (Australia) Neil Robertson | 3
6 | (England) Ali Carter | 5
7 | (England) Ronnie O'Sullivan | 3
2 | (England) Judd Trump | 5

Semi-finals; Best of 11 frames
8 | (Hong Kong) Marco Fu | 6
5 | (China) Ding Junhui | 5
6 | (England) Ali Carter | 4
2 | (England) Judd Trump | 6

Final; Best of 19 frames
8 | (Hong Kong) Marco Fu | 8
2 | (England) Judd Trump | 10

== Final ==
Final: Best of 19 frames. Referee: Brendan Moore. Venue Cymru, Llandudno, Wales, 12 March 2017.
| Marco Fu (8); Hong Kong | 8–10 | Judd Trump (2); England |
Afternoon: 0–89 (83), 69–26 (53), 73–9 (73), 8–78, 82–0 (67), 87–8, 83–0 (83), 0–136 (136), 0–115 (115); Evening: 34–90, 24–110 (110), 0–92 (63), 9–77 (76), 66–33, 63–52 (Fu 52), 0–102 (102), 69–22 (58), 0–102 (53)
| 83 | Highest break | 136 |
| 0 | Century breaks | 4 |
| 6 | 50+ breaks | 8 |

== Century breaks ==
Total: 18

- 136, 132, 115, 113, 110, 102, 101 – Judd Trump
- 131, 105 – Anthony Hamilton
- 123 – Neil Robertson
- 118, 109, 101 – Ronnie O'Sullivan
- 115, 107 – Ali Carter
- 110 – Shaun Murphy
- 107 – Ding Junhui
- 106 – Marco Fu
