= 2026–27 snooker season =

Series of snooker tournaments

Details
- Duration: 22 June 2026 – 9 May 2027
- Tournaments: World Snooker Tour: 22 (18 ranking events); WPBSA Q Tour: 15; World Women's: 8 World Seniors: 12

Triple Crown winners
- UK Championship
- Masters
- World Championship

The 2026–27 snooker season is an ongoing professional snooker season that features tournaments played from June 2026 to May 2027. It includes the professional World Snooker Tour, the second-tier Q Tour, and featured events from World Women's Snooker and World Seniors Tour. 18 professional ranking events are planned to hold during the season, with the Middle East events (Saudi Arabia Masters and the Riyadh Season Championship) discontinued this season in coincidence to the ongoing war in the region and were replaced by the revived China Open.

Former world champion Kyren Wilson achieved a hat-trick of consecutive tournament wins for the first time since Judd Trump in 2023. Welshman Jak Jones enjoyed an early season resurgence as he collected his first and second ranking wins after being on tour for 16 years.

== Players ==
The World Snooker Tour includes the top 64 players from the world rankings after the 2026 World Championship, plus the 33 players in their second year of a two-year tour card, and players who attain professional status during the 2025–26 snooker season.

=== New professional players ===
The players listed below received a two-year tour card for the 2026–27 and 2027–28 seasons.

Top 4 players from the 2025–26 one-year ranking list

1. Alfie Burden (ENG)
2. Antoni Kowalski (POL)
3. Julien Leclercq (BEL)
4. Artemijs Žižins (LAT)

International champions

5. WSF Open champion: Hammad Miah (ENG)
6. WSF Junior champion: Michael Larkov (UKR)
7. EBSA European runner-up: (Note: The champion of the event, Anton Kazakov, had already earned a professional tour card via the European Under-21.) Oliver Sykes (ENG)
8. EBSA European Under-21 champion: Anton Kazakov (UKR)
9. APSBF Asia Pacific champion: Paul Norris (ENG)
10. PABSA Americas champion: Igor Figueiredo (BRA)
11. ABSC African champion: Mina Awad (EGY)

Q Tour

Main article: 2025–26 Q Tour
12. Highest ranked: Jamie Clarke (WAL)
13. Playoff: Ashley Carty (ENG)
14. Playoff: Craig Steadman (ENG)
15. Playoff: Ashley Hugill (ENG)

CBSA China Tour

16. Wang Xinbo (CHN)
17. Luo Zetao (CHN)

World Women's Snooker qualifiers

18. Women's World Champion: Panchaya Channoi (THA)
19. Highest ranked: Bai Yulu (CHN)

Q School

Main article: 2026 Q School

Event 1

20. Cheung Ka Wai (HKG)
21. Phil O'Kane (ENG)
22. Sean O'Sullivan (ENG)
23. Liam Davies (WAL)

Event 2

24. Andrew Higginson (ENG)
25. Gong Chenzhi (CHN)
26. Stuart Carrington (ENG)
27. Mitchell Mann (ENG)

Asia-Oceania Event 1

28. Thanawat Tirapongpaiboon (THA)
29. Deng Haohui (CHN)

Asia-Oceania Event 2

30. Huang Jiahao (CHN)
31. Liu Yang (CHN)

== Calendar ==
The following tables outline the dates and results for all the World Snooker Tour, World Women's Snooker Tour, World Seniors Tour, Q Tour, and other events in the season.

=== World Snooker Tour ===
Start	Finish	Tournament	Venue	Winner	Score	Runner-up	Ref.
22 Jun	15 Jul	Championship League	Leicester Arena in Leicester, England	Jak Jones (WAL)	3–2	David Gilbert (ENG)	
27 Jul	2 Aug	Shanghai Masters^{†}	Luwan Indoor Stadium in Shanghai, China	Judd Trump (ENG)	11–6	Kyren Wilson (ENG)	
8 Aug	16 Aug	China Open	Riverside Sports Centre in Taiyuan, China	Mark Selby (ENG)	10–6	Noppon Saengkham (THA)	
23 Aug	29 Aug	Wuhan Open	Optics Valley Gymnasium in Wuhan, China	Chang Bingyu (CHN)	10–7	Zhao Xintong (CHN)	
31 Aug	6 Sep	British Open	The Centaur in Cheltenham, England	Jak Jones (WAL)	10–6	Mark Selby (ENG)	
7 Sep	13 Sep	English Open	Brentwood Centre in Brentwood, England	Ali Carter (ENG)	9–6	Mark Williams (WAL)	
28 Sep	4 Oct	Shenzhen Open (Note: Originally branded as the 2026 Xi'an Grand Prix.)	Bao'an Sports Centre in Shenzhen, China	Wu Yize (CHN)	10–5	Yuan Sijun (CHN)	
18 Oct	25 Oct	Northern Ireland Open	Waterfront Hall in Belfast, Northern Ireland	Kyren Wilson (ENG)	9–2	Jak Jones (WAL)	
31 Oct	7 Nov	International Championship	SNCNFC in Nanjing, China	Kyren Wilson (ENG)	10–8	John Higgins (SCO)	
9 Nov	15 Nov	Champion of Champions^{†}	Leicester Arena in Leicester, England	Kyren Wilson (ENG)	10–8	Chris Wakelin (ENG)	
28 Nov	6 Dec	UK Championship	Barbican in York, England				
9 Dec	12 Dec	Shoot Out	Tower Circus in Blackpool, England				
14 Dec	20 Dec	Scottish Open	Meadowbank Sports Centre in Edinburgh, Scotland				
21 Dec	23 Jan	Championship League Invitational^{†}	Leicester Arena in Leicester, England				
10 Jan	17 Jan	Masters^{†}	Alexandra Palace in London, England				
25 Jan	31 Jan	German Masters	Tempodrom in Berlin, Germany				
8 Feb	14 Feb	Welsh Open	Venue Cymru in Llandudno, Wales				
16 Feb	21 Feb	World Grand Prix	Kai Tak Arena in Kowloon City, Hong Kong				
2 Mar	7 Mar	Players Championship	Telford International Centre in Telford, England				
15 Mar	21 Mar	World Open	Yushan Sport Centre in Yushan, China				
29 Mar	4 Apr	Tour Championship	Manchester Central in Manchester, England				
17 Apr	3 May	World Championship	Crucible Theatre in Sheffield, England				

Ranking event
^{†} Non-ranking event

Note: This calendar only includes events that have been confirmed by the World Snooker Tour, and is subject to change at any time during the season.

=== WPBSA Q Tour ===
Start	Finish	Tournament	Venue	Winner	Score	Runner-up	Ref.
26 Jun	28 Jun	Asia Pacific – Event 1 (Note: Event also known as the 2026 West Coast International.)	Pot Black North Perth in Perth, Australia	Vinnie Calabrese (AUS)	5–3	Hassan Kerde (AUS)	
10 Jul	12 Jul	Asia Pacific – Event 2 (Note: Event also known as the 2026 New Zealand Open.)	Papatoetoe Cosmopolitan Club in Auckland, New Zealand	Mark Canovan (NZL)	5–2	Joseph Conchie (NZL)	
31 Jul	2 Aug	Asia Pacific – Event 3 (Note: Event also known as the 2026 Fred Osbourne Classic.)	Commercial Club Albury in Albury, Australia	Hassan Kerde (AUS)	4–0	Alan McCarthy (AUS)	
27 Aug	30 Aug	Europe – Event 1	Northern Snooker Centre in Leeds, England	Sanderson Lam (ENG)	4–1	Farakh Ajaib (PAK)	
21 Sep	24 Sep	Europe – Event 2	Princess Hotel in Sofia, Bulgaria	Aaron Busuttil (MLT)	4–0	Edward Jones (ENG)	
8 Oct	11 Oct	Asia Pacific – Event 4 (Note: Event also known as the 2026 Australian Open.)	Mounties in Sydney, Australia	Vinnie Calabrese (AUS)	6–2	Daniell Haenga (NZL)	
22 Oct	25 Oct	Europe – Event 3	Snooker Arena Germany in Oberhausen, Germany	Riley Powell (WAL)	4–1	Mark Lloyd (ENG)	
12 Nov	15 Nov	Europe – Event 4	Austrian Snooker Academy in Vienna, Austria	Callum Beresford (ENG)	4–1	Sebastian Milewski (POL)	
3 Dec	7 Dec	Europe – Event 5	Landywood Snooker Club in Walsall, England				
7 Jan	10 Jan	Europe – Event 6	De Pomerans in Lochristi, Belgium				
22 Jan	24 Jan	Americas – Event 1	The Corner Bank in Toronto, Canada				
22 Jan	25 Jan	Asia Pacific – Event 5 (Note: Event also known as the 2027 Clem Jones AC Queensland Open.)	Redcliffe Snooker Club in Brisbane, Australia				
5 Feb	7 Feb	Americas – Event 2	PABSA Academy in San Jose, US				
11 Feb	14 Feb	Europe – Event 7	Ding Junhui Snooker Academy in Sheffield, England				
Mar	Mar	Global Play-Offs					

Ranking event (Q Tour Europe)
Non-ranking event (Q Tour Global)

=== World Women's Snooker Tour ===
Start	Finish	Tournament	Venue	Winner	Score	Runner-up	Ref.
4 Sep	6 Sep	UK Women's Championship	Northern Snooker Centre in Leeds, England	Bai Yulu (CHN)	4–1	Reanne Evans (ENG)	
17 Oct	20 Oct	Australian Women's Open	Mounties in Sydney, Australia	Ng On-yee (HKG)	4–3	Mink Nutcharut (THA)	
24 Oct	27 Oct	Malaysian Women's Open	Niche Premium Brem Mall in Kuala Lumpur, Malaysia	Reanne Evans (ENG)	5–0	Mink Nutcharut (THA)	
27 Nov	29 Nov	Irish Women's Open	SBI Academy in Carlow, Ireland				
25 Jan	28 Jan	WSF Women's Championship	The Grand Blue Fafa Resort in Kavajë, Albania				
12 Feb	14 Feb	Belgian Women's Open	Trickshot in Bruges, Belgium				
19 Mar	21 Mar	British Women's Open	Landywood Snooker Club in Walsall, England				
May	May	World Women's Championship	Changping Snooker Centre in Dongguan, China				

=== World Seniors Tour ===
Start	Finish	Tournament	Venue	Winner	Score	Runner-up	Ref.
14 Aug	16 Aug	Seniors Tour – Event 1	Crucible Sports Club in Reading, England	Craig Steadman (ENG)	4–0	Dean Galbally (ENG)	
25 Sep	27 Sep	Seniors Tour – Event 2	Crucible Sports Club in Reading, England	Ryan Day (WAL)	4–1	Andy Lavin (ENG)	
9 Oct	11 Oct	Seniors Tour – Event 3	Crucible Sports Club in Reading, England	Craig Steadman (ENG)	4–2	Jimmy Robertson (ENG)	
20 Nov	22 Nov	Seniors Tour – Event 4	Crucible Sports Club in Reading, England				
11 Dec	13 Dec	Seniors Tour – Event 5	Crucible Sports Club in Reading, England				
27 Dec	28 Dec	British Seniors Open	Vaillant Live in Derby, England				
15 Jan	17 Jan	Seniors Tour – Event 6	Crucible Sports Club in Reading, England				
5 Feb	7 Feb	Seniors Tour – Event 7	Crucible Sports Club in Reading, England				
19 Feb	21 Feb	UK Seniors Championship	St George's Hall in Liverpool, England				
5 Mar	7 Mar	Seniors Tour – Event 8	Crucible Sports Club in Reading, England				
2 Apr	4 Apr	Seniors Tour – Event 9	Crucible Sports Club in Reading, England				
5 May	9 May	World Seniors Championship	Crucible Theatre in Sheffield, England				

=== Other events ===
Start	Finish	Tournament	Venue	Winner	Score	Runner-up	Ref.
10 Oct	13 Oct	Pink Ribbon	Landywood Snooker Club in Walsall, England	Stan Moody (ENG)	4–2	Mark Joyce (ENG)	
17 Oct	18 Oct	Wels Open	Paul Schopf Snooker Club in Wels, Austria	Florian Nüßle (AUT)	4–0	Paul Schopf (AUT)	
4 Nov	8 Nov	Pan American Championship	Mampituba Country Club in Criciúma, Brazil	Noel Rodrigues Moreira (BRA)	5–4	Daniel Holoyda (USA)	
11 Dec	21 Dec	Asian Indoor Games – Men's singles	Princess Nourah Bint Abdul Rahman University in Riyadh, Saudi Arabia				
11 Dec	21 Dec	Asian Indoor Games – Men's team	Princess Nourah Bint Abdul Rahman University in Riyadh, Saudi Arabia				
11 Dec	21 Dec	Asian Indoor Games – Women's six-red singles	Princess Nourah Bint Abdul Rahman University in Riyadh, Saudi Arabia				
17 Mar	21 Mar	Asia Pacific Championship	Papatoetoe Cosmopolitan Club in Auckland, New Zealand				

== Tournament rankings ==
=== World ranking points ===
The ranking points for reaching different stages of each ranking tournament are listed below.

Round Tournament	R144	R128	R112	R96	R80	R64	R48	R32	R24	R16	R12	QF	R6	SF	F	W
Championship League	—N/a	0 (Note: First stage fourth-placed)	—N/a	1,000 (Note: First stage third-placed)	—N/a	2,000 (Note: First stage runner-up)	—N/a	4,000 (Note: Second stage fourth-placed)	5,000 (Note: Second stage third-placed)	6,000 (Note: Second stage runner-up)	—N/a	8,000 (Note: Third stage fourth-placed)	9,000 (Note: Third stage third-placed)	11,000 (Note: Third stage runner-up)	23,000	33,000
China Open	0	—N/a	2,500 (Note: Players who lose their first match receive no ranking points.)	—N/a	5,000	—N/a	7,500	10,000	—N/a	15,000	—N/a	25,000	—N/a	50,000	100,000	250,000
Wuhan Open	—N/a	0	—N/a	1,500	—N/a	4,500	—N/a	8,000	—N/a	12,000	—N/a	22,000	—N/a	33,000	75,000	175,000
British Open	—N/a	0	—N/a	—N/a	—N/a	3,000	—N/a	6,000	—N/a	9,000	—N/a	12,000	—N/a	20,000	45,000	100,000
English Open	—N/a	0	—N/a	1,000	—N/a	3,600	—N/a	5,400	—N/a	9,000	—N/a	13,200	—N/a	21,000	45,000	100,000
Shenzhen Open	—N/a	0	—N/a	1,600	—N/a	4,700	—N/a	8,250	—N/a	12,500	—N/a	22,350	—N/a	34,500	76,000	177,000
Northern Ireland Open	—N/a	0	—N/a	1,000	—N/a	3,600	—N/a	5,400	—N/a	9,000	—N/a	13,200	—N/a	21,000	45,000	100,000
International Championship	—N/a	0	—N/a	—N/a	—N/a	5,000	—N/a	9,000	—N/a	14,000	—N/a	22,000	—N/a	33,000	75,000	175,000
