= Stadthalle Fürth =

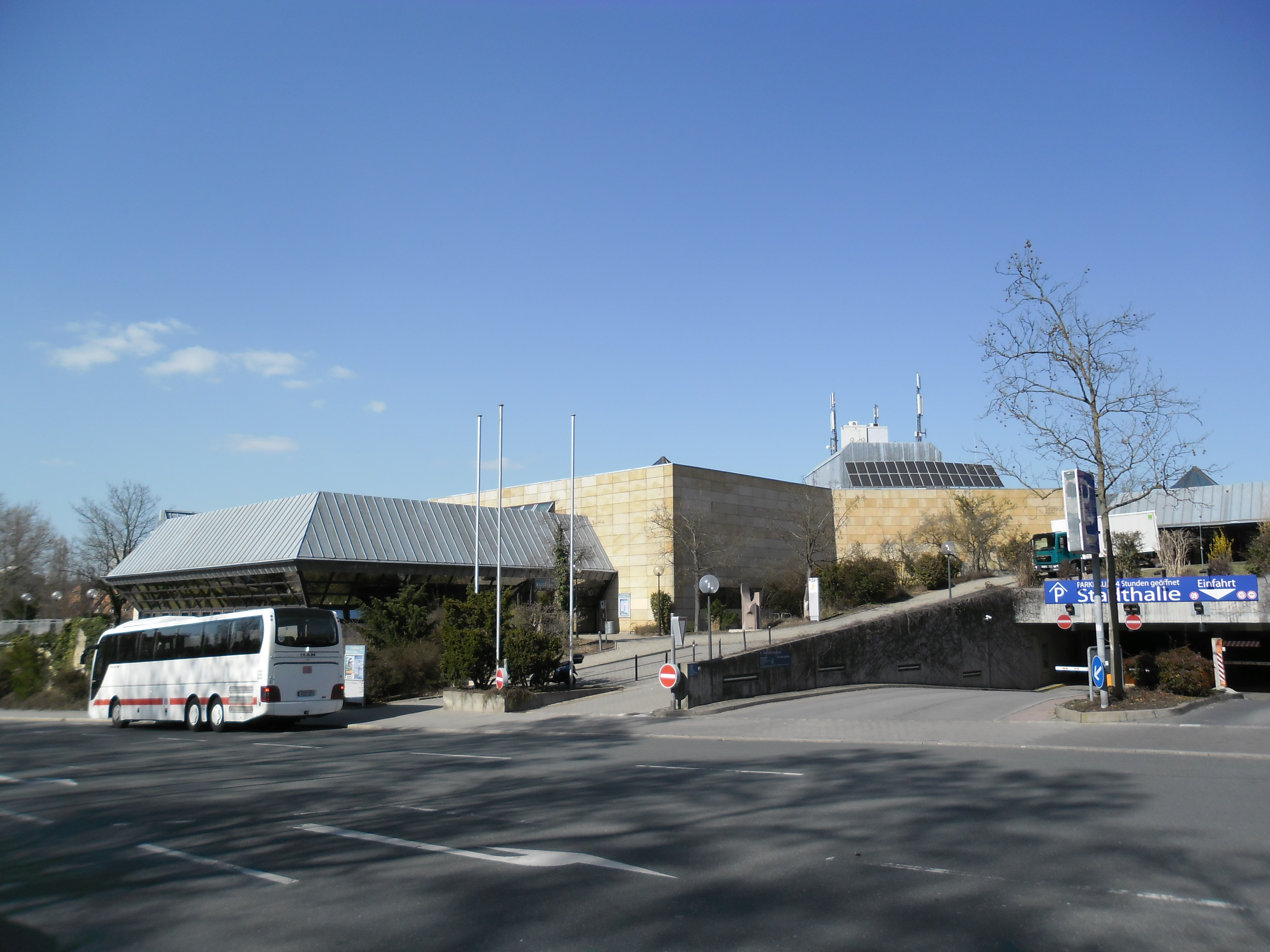
Stadthalle Fürth

Stadthalle Fürth is a multi-purpose indoor arena located in Fürth, Germany. It opened in 1982 and has a total area of 2,500 m^{2}. Notable past performers include Chuck Berry, Frank Zappa, Alice Cooper, Ted Nugent, Ozzy Osbourne, Beastie Boys and Run–D.M.C.

It is also known as the regular venue of the Paul Hunter Classic, a professional snooker tournament for many years.
